= Andhra Pradesh =

State in southeastern India

- State
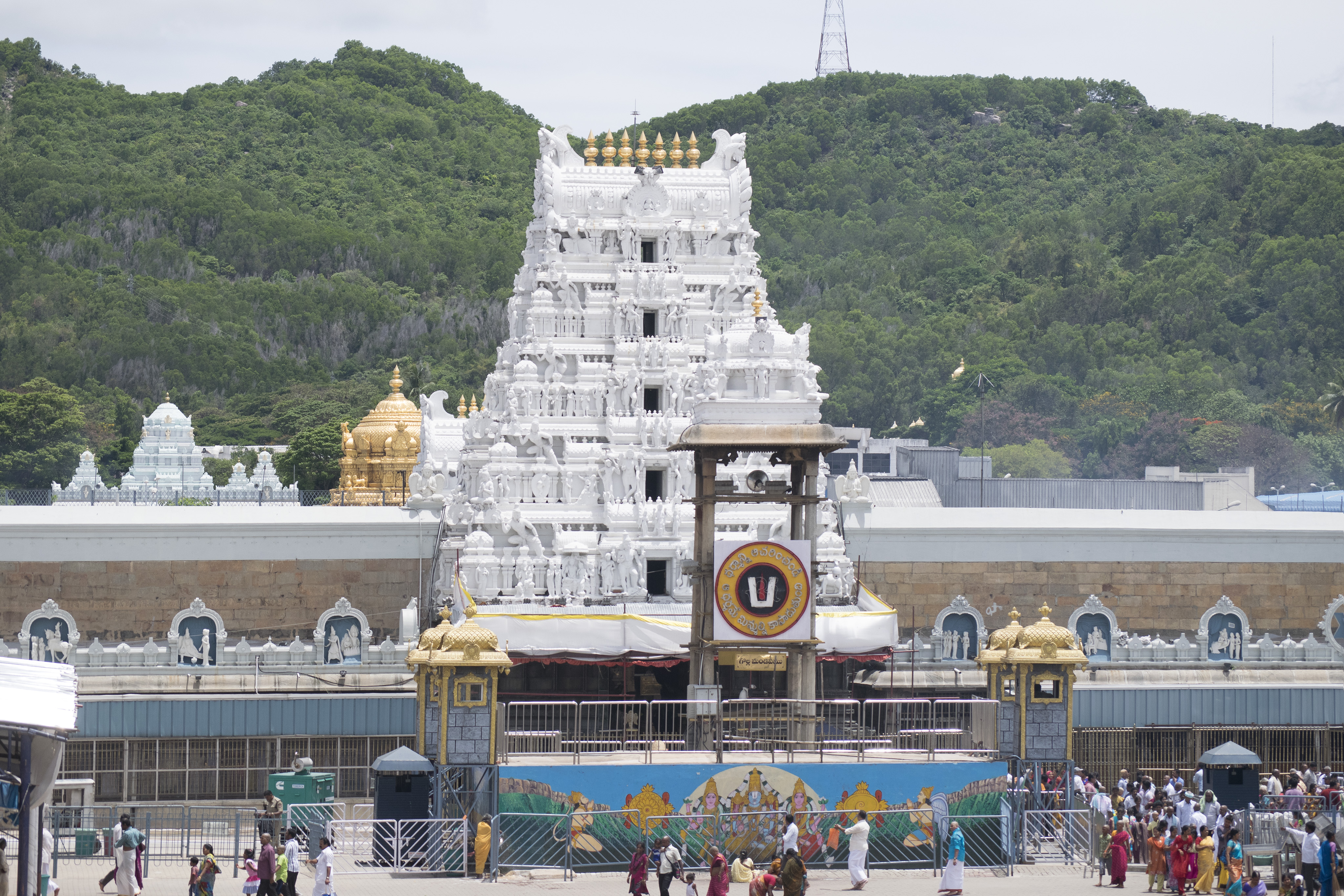
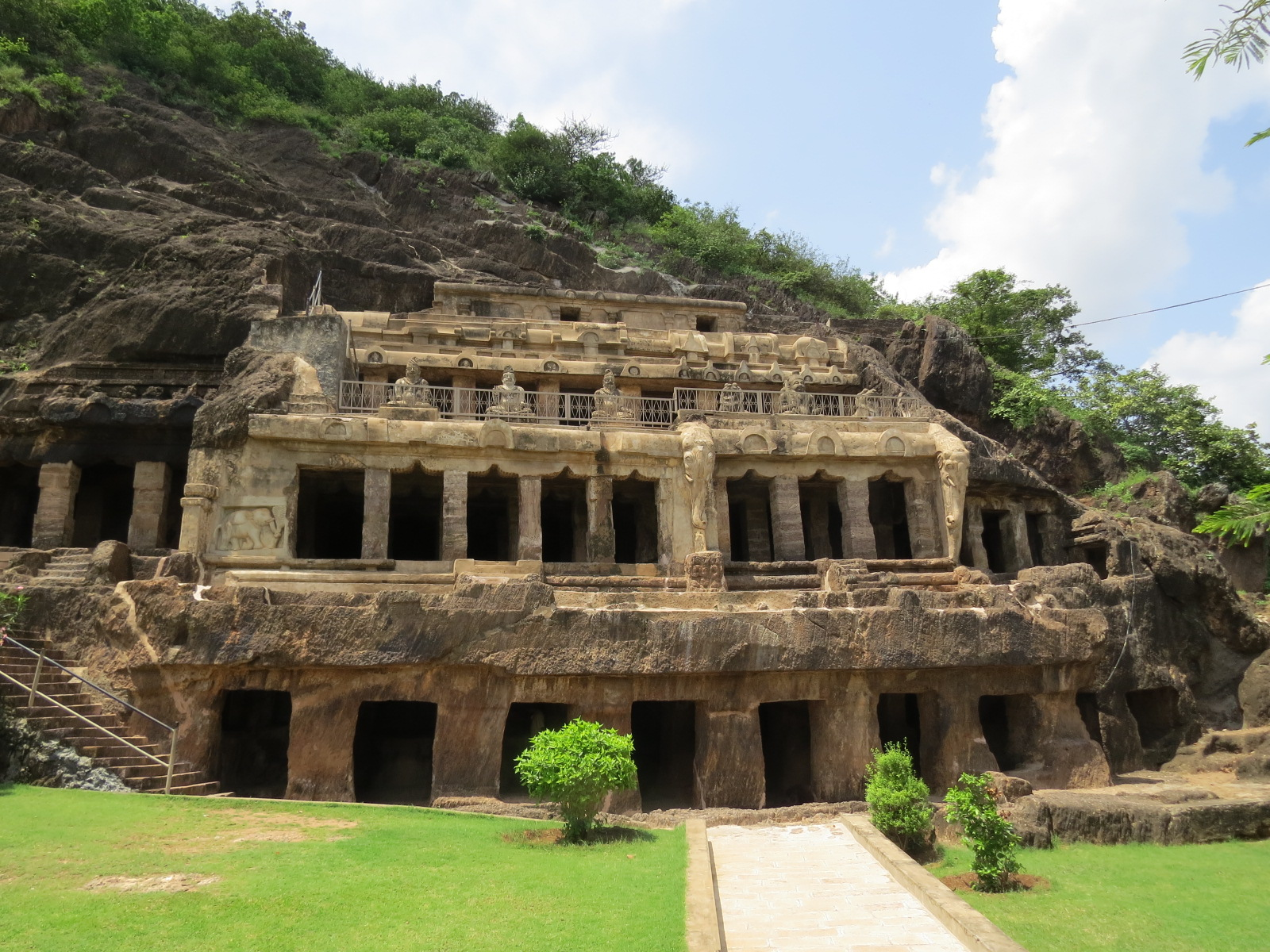
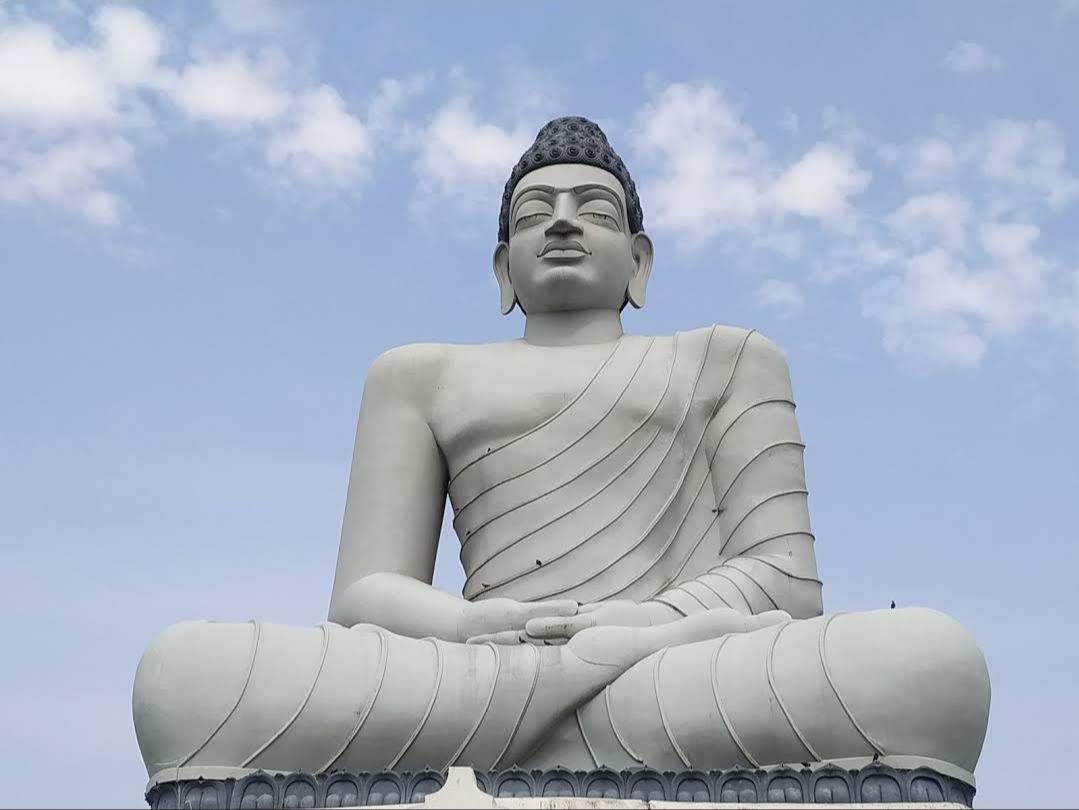
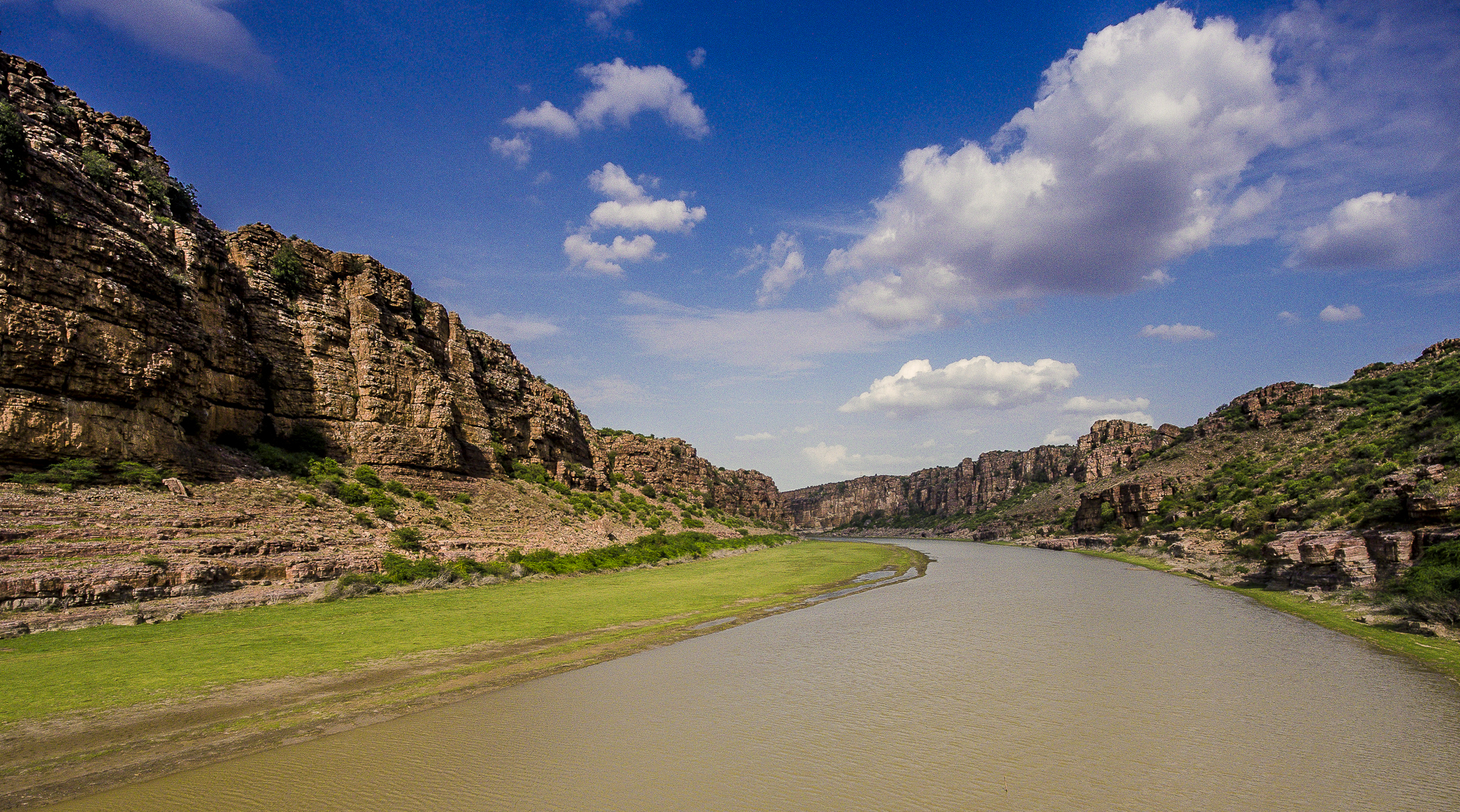
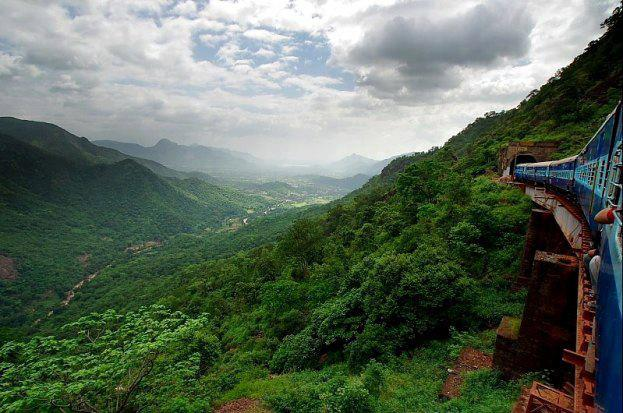
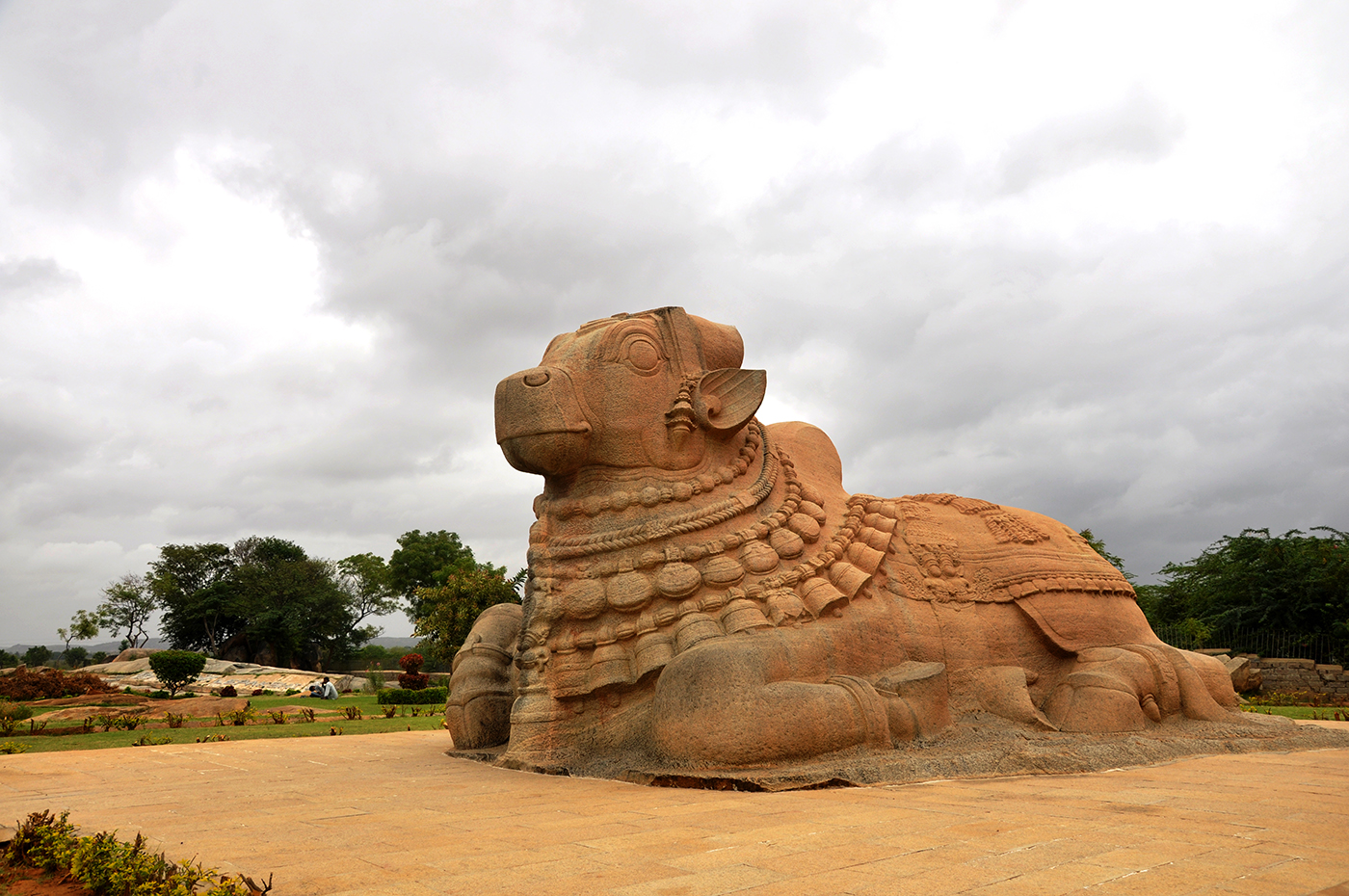
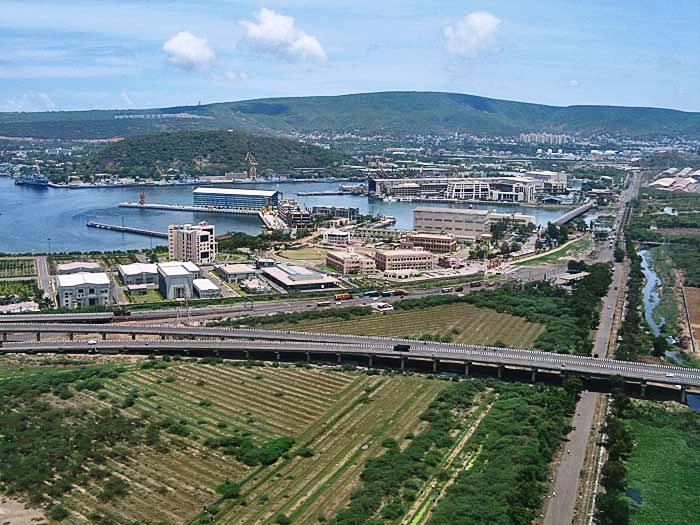
- Sri Venkateswara Swami Temple Undavalli Caves Dhyana Buddha statue Gandikota gorge Araku Valley Lepakshi Nandi Visakhapatnam Port

- Emblem of Andhra Pradesh
- Etymology: "Province of the Andhras"
- Motto: Satyameva Jayate (Sanskrit) "Truth Alone Triumphs"
- Anthem: Ma Telugu Talliki "To/For Our Mother Telugu"
- Location of Andhra Pradesh in India
- Coordinates: 16.51°N 80.52°E
- Country: India
- Region: South India
- Previously was: Undivided Andhra Pradesh
- Bifurcation: 2 June 2014 (12 years ago) (Note: Bifurcated by forming Telangana.)
- Consolidation: 1 November 1956 (70 years ago)
- Formation: 1 October 1953 (73 years ago)
- Capital: Amaravati
- Largest city: Visakhapatnam
- Districts: 28

Government
  - Body: Government of Andhra Pradesh
  - Governor: Syed Abdul Nazeer
  - Chief Minister: N. Chandrababu Naidu (TDP)
  - Deputy Chief Minister: Pawan Kalyan (JSP)
  - Chief Secretary: G. Sai Prasad

Area
  - Total: 162,975 km^{2} (62,925 sq mi)
  - Rank: 7th
- Highest elevation (Arma Konda): 1,680 m (5,510 ft)
- Lowest elevation (Bay of Bengal): 0 m (0 ft)

Population (2011)
  - Total: 49,577,103
  - Rank: 10th
  - Density: 304/km^{2} (790/sq mi)
  - Urban: 37.69%
  - Rural: 62.31%
- Demonym(s): Andhrulu, Teluguvāru

Language
  - Official: Telugu
  - Additional official: Urdu
  - Official script: Telugu script

GDP
  - Total (2025-26): ▲₹17.62 trillion (US$190 billion) (nominal)
  - Rank: 8th
  - Per capita: ▲₹298,058 (US$3,200) (13th)
- Time zone: UTC+05:30 (IST)
- ISO 3166 code: IN-AP
- Vehicle registration: AP
- HDI (2023): ▲0.723 high (26th)
- Literacy (2024): 72.6% (36th)
- Sex ratio (2025): 993♀/1000 ♂ (20th)
- Website: ap.gov.in
- Symbols of Andhra Pradesh
- Foundation day: Andhra Pradesh Day
- Bird: Rose-ringed parakeet
- Flower: Jasmine
- Fruit: Banginapalle Mango
- Mammal: Blackbuck
- Tree: Neem
- State highway mark
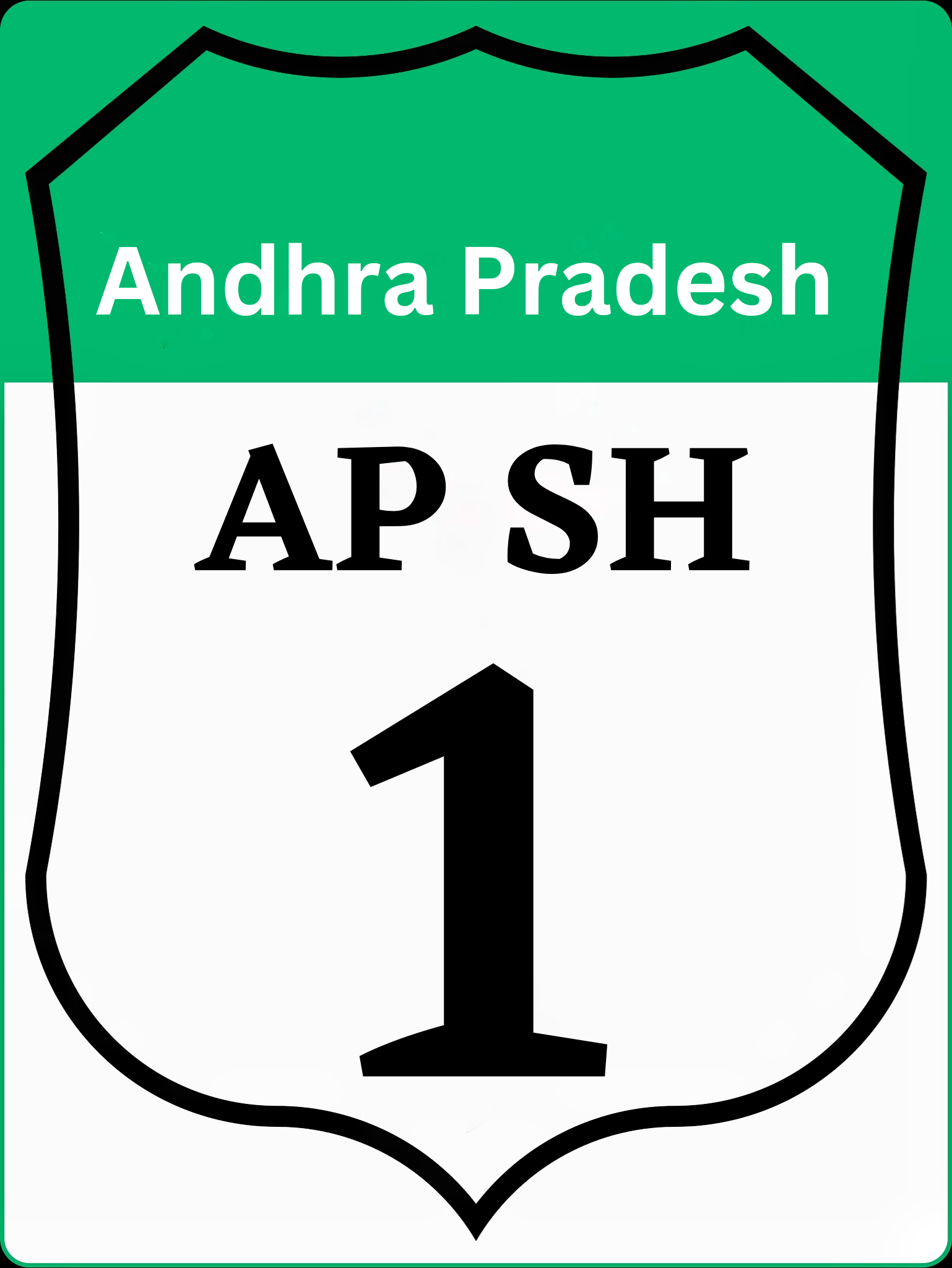
- State highway of Andhra Pradesh; AP SH1–AP SH240
- List of Indian state symbols

Andhra Pradesh (Note: ISO: Āndhra Pradēśa, pronounced [aːndʱɾə pɾədeʃᵊ], abbr. AP) is a state on the east coast of southern India. The seventh largest Indian state by area and the tenth largest by population, it is bound by the Bay of Bengal to the east, and shares borders with the states of Odisha to the northeast, Chhattisgarh to the north, Telangana to northwest, Karnataka to the west, and Tamil Nadu to the south. Telugu, one of the classical languages of India, is the most widely spoken language in the state and serves as its official language. Amaravati is the state capital, and Visakhapatnam is the largest city.

Archaeological excavations have unearthed stone tools used by early hominins and later Neolithic settlements. The Andhras are mentioned in the Aitareya Brahmana (c. 800 BCE) of the Rigveda. In the 4th century BCE, Megasthenes described the Andhras living in the Godavari and Krishna River deltas, and the region later came under the control of the Mauryan Empire. The Satavahana dynasty ruled over most of the Deccan from the 1st to 3rd century CE, with their capital at Dhanyakataka. Subsequent major dynasties that ruled the region include the Vishnukundinas, Andhra Ikshvakus, Pallavas, Eastern Chalukyas, Cholas, Kakatiyas, Vijayanagara Empire, and Qutb Shahis. European colonisation began in the 17th century, with the British controlling much of the state as a part of the Madras Presidency for two centuries. After the Indian independence in 1947, Andhra State was carved out of Madras State in 1953. In 1956, it merged with the Telugu-speaking regions of the former Hyderabad State to form Andhra Pradesh. A new state of Telangana was bifurcated from it in 2014.

The Eastern Ghats separate the coastal plains from the Deccan Plateau. Major rivers include Godavari, Krishna, Tungabhadra, and Penna, which flow eastwards towards the Bay of Bengal. The state has significant reserves of limestone, bauxite, and a major proportion of India's baryte reserves. As of September 2020, agriculture and related activities employed 62.2% of the population, with rice as the staple crop. Fisheries is a major contributor to the economy, with the state accounting for 30% of the country's fish production in 2022-23. The Satish Dhawan Space Centre in Sriharikota serves as India's primary satellite launch centre.

Andhra Pradesh has a diverse culture and is home to art forms like Kuchipudi, an Indian classical dance, and Carnatic music. It is the birthplace of the Amaravati school of art that influenced South and Southeast Asian art. The state is home to a number of pilgrimage centres including the Venkateswara temple in Tirumala and natural attractions. Unique geographical indications from the state include Bandar laddu, Banganapalle mango, Dharmavaram silk sari, Kondapalli toys, and Tirupati laddu.

== Etymology ==
The Andhras are mentioned in the Aitareya Brahmana of the Rigveda (c. 800–500 BCE) as descendants of the sage Vishvamitra. They are referred to as non-Aryans living on the fringes of Aryan settlements. In Puranic literature, they are referred to as Andhras, Andhrara-jateeya, and Andhrabhrtya. According to scholars, the term Andhra functioned as both a tribal and a territorial name. The region inhabited by the Andhras was called Andhradesa, which was also known by other names including Andhramandala, Andhravisaya, Andhrabhumi, and Andhrapadha. According to Iravatham Mahadevan, the term āndhra is derived from the Old Telugu masculine nominative marker aṉṟu, possibly used by Indo-Aryan people or Buddhists to refer to the Telugu people. Pradesh means "state" or "province" in Sanskrit and several Indian languages.

== History ==
=== Pre-history (before 4th century BCE) ===
Stone tools excavated from Hanumanthunipadu were dated to approximately 247,000 years old (Middle Palaeolithic). Although this finding suggests that archaic Hominini existed in the Indian subcontinent long before the migration of modern humans from Africa began (about 125,000 years ago), the absence of fossil evidence has made it difficult to identify the people who made these tools. Neolithic burial sites, and petroglyphs, dating back to 4,000 to 5,000 years ago were found in Achammakunta in Palnadu district and Chakrala Bodu in Markapuram district. These burial sites house extensive cists and dolmens, aligned in the same direction and often surrounded by a wall.

=== Early history (4th century BCE to 4th century CE) ===
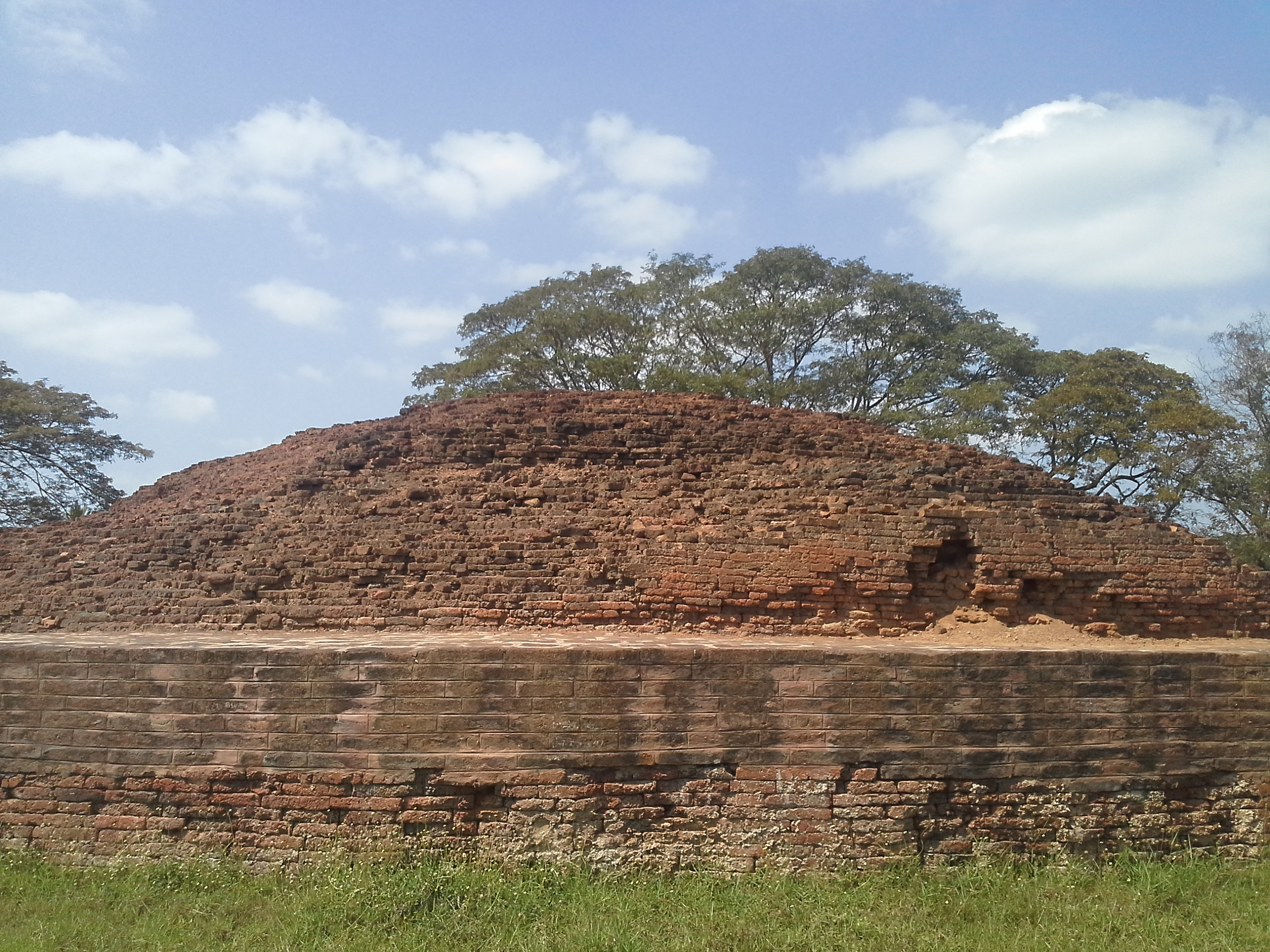
Ruins of the Buddhist Maha Stupa at Bhattiprolu (c. 3rd to 2nd century BCE)

Early Hindu texts refer to the Andhras who lived in Andhradesa. Greek historian Megasthenes reported in his Indica (c. 310 BCE) that Andhras lived in the Godavari and Krishna river deltas and were known for their military strength, which he ranked second only to the Mauryans in all India. Archaeological evidence from sites such as Amaravathi, Bhattiprolu, and Dharanikota suggests that the Andhra region might have been part of the Maurya Empire in the 3rd century BCE. After the death of Emperor Ashoka in 232 BCE, the Maurya rule weakened and was replaced by several smaller kingdoms in the Andhra region. Buddhist relics from Bhattiprolu (c. 3rd to 2nd century BCE) bear Brahmi inscriptions, and the Bhattiprolu script is considered a key for deciphering Tamil Brahmi. The Telugu script evolved later from the Kadamba script, which shares similarities with the Brahmi script.

The Satavahana dynasty dominated the Deccan Plateau from the 2nd century BCE to the 3rd century CE. The Satavahanas ruled from their capital Dhanyakataka, which according to historian Stanley Wolpert, might have been the most prosperous city in India in the 2nd century. Roman coins unearthed from Nagarjunakonda and the mention of the port of Machilipatnam (Maisolia) in the Periplus of the Erythraean Sea (c. 1st century) indicate that trade relations existed with the Roman Empire during the period. Although uncertain, as per some scholars, Nagarjuna, the founder of the Madhyamaka school of Mahayana, lived in the region during the Satavahana period. The Amaravati School of Art, which is regarded as one of the three major styles of ancient Indian art, developed during the period and had a great influence on art in South Asia and Southeast Asia.

The Andhra Ikshvakus, with their capital at Vijayapuri, succeeded the Satavahanas in the Krishna River valley in the 3rd century. The Salankayanas ruled the region between Godavari and Krishna rivers with their capital at Vengi from the 4th to the early 5th century.

=== Medieval history (5th to 16th century) ===
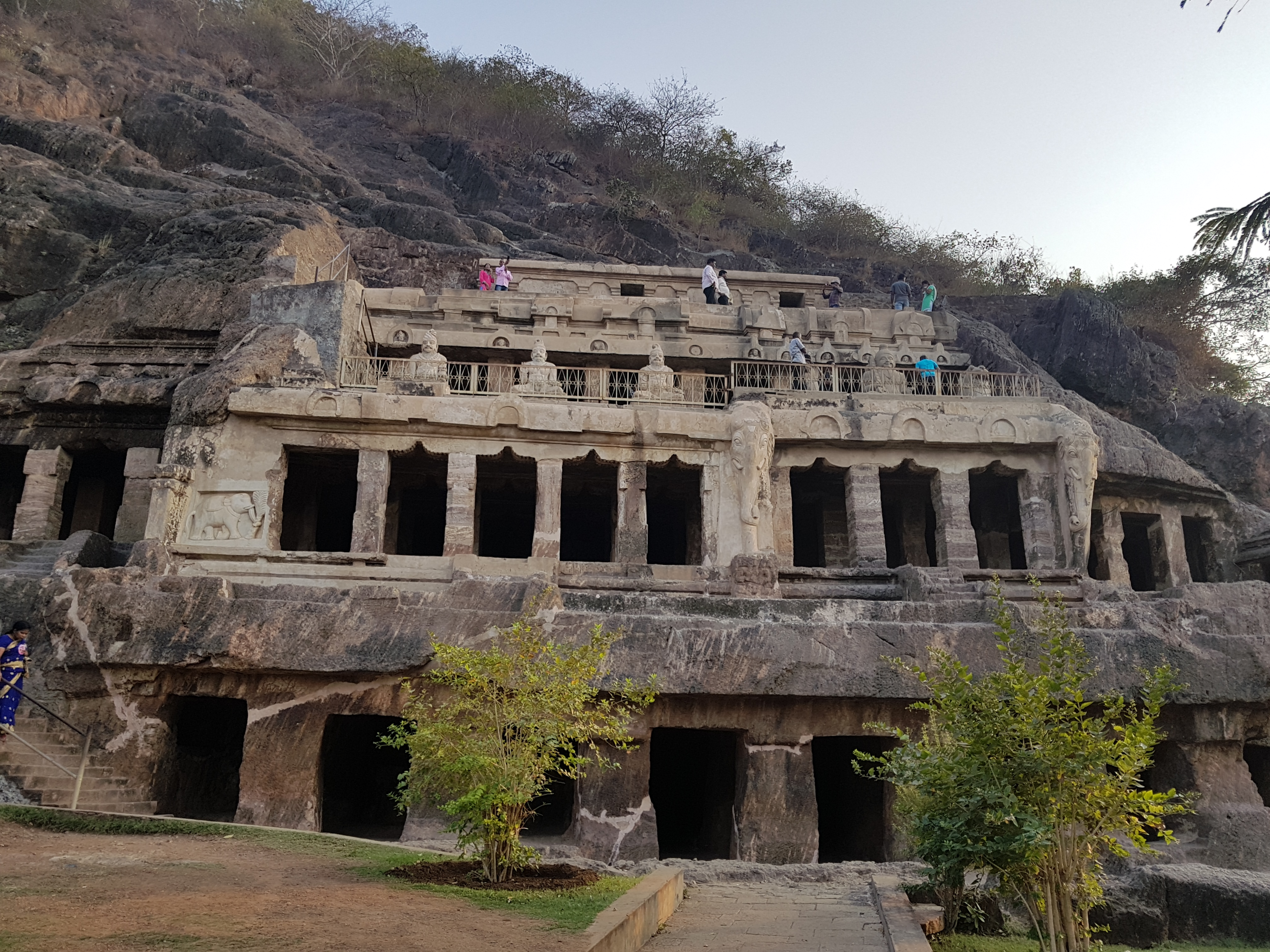
Undavalli Caves, an example of the rock-cut architecture of the Vishnukundinas c. 5th to 6th century

The Vishnukundinas held sway over the region in the 5th and 6th centuries. The Undavalli Caves are an example of Indian rock-cut architecture of that time. The Telugu Cholas (Renati Chodas) ruled the south Andhra region from the 6th to the 13th centuries intermittently, initially as samantas of the Pallavas and later under the Cholas. The oldest Telugu inscription is the Kalamalla sasanam, dated to 575, which was carved during the reign of the Renati Choda king Erikal Muturaju Dhanunjaya. The Eastern Chalukyas ruled the Vengi region from the 7th century to early 12th century, and later continued to rule under the protection of the Cholas until 1189. Early Telugu literature appeared during the Chalukya period.

The Kakatiyas ruled the region between the late 12th and early 14th centuries. After repeated attacks from the Delhi Sultanate, the Kakatiyas fell in the early 14th century, which resulted in anarchy. The Musunuri Nayakas briefly wrested power in northern Andhra, before the Bahmani Kingdom took control of the region, while the Reddi Kingdom ruled the coastal Andhra region. The Reddis constructed several fortifications including the Kondaveedu and Kondapalli Forts.

The Gajapatis ruled parts of the region in the late 15th century before the region became part of the Vijayanagara Empire during the reign of Krishnadevaraya in the early 16th century. The Pemmasani Nayaks controlled parts of the northern Andhra region and were allied with the Vijayanagara Empire. The Nayaks had a large army that fought for the Vijayanagara kings against the Bahmani Kingdom. During the Vijayanagara rule, several infrastructure projects were built including tanks and anicuts. The Vijayanagara kings also patronised art and literature, and built several temples and monuments. The Lepakshi group of monuments, which are part of the tentative list of the UNESCO World Heritage Sites, was built during the period.

=== Later conflicts and European colonisation (17th to 20th century) ===
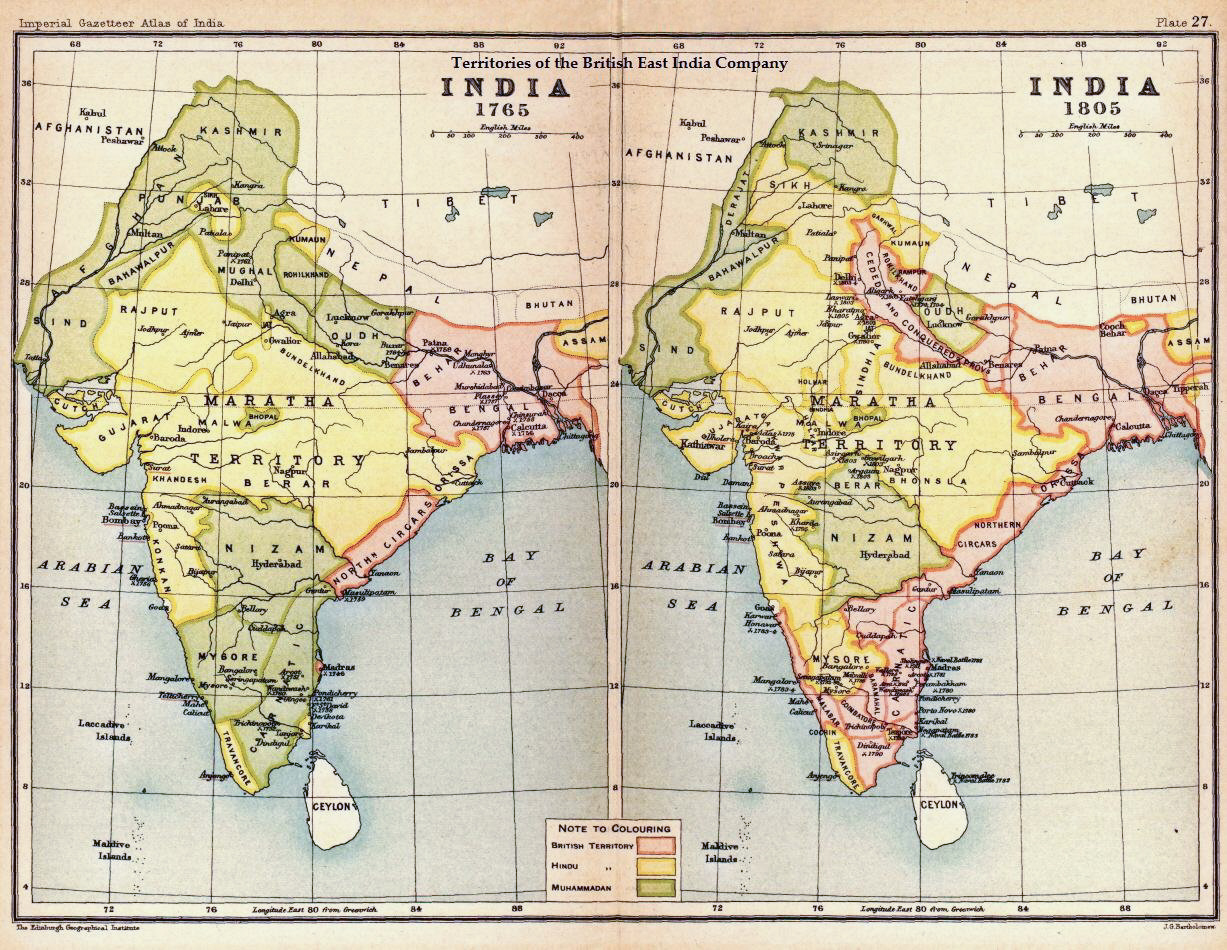
Map of India in 1765 (left) ad 1805 showing the regions ruled by the British East India Company, Carnatic Sultanate, Kingdom of Mysore, and Nizam of Hyderabad

After the Vijayanagara Empire was defeated in the Battle of Talikota in 1565 by a confederacy of Deccan sultanates, and the break-up of the sultanates, the Sultanate of Golconda controlled parts of Andhra while the Nayaks including Pemmasani Nayaks, Sayapaneni Nayaks, and Nayakas of Kalahasti supported the Aravidu dynasty and continued to ruled parts of the region. Majority of the region later came under the rule of the Mughal Empire in the 17th century. Nizam-ul-Mulk, initially appointed as viceroy of the Deccan by the Mughals in 1713, established himself as a semi-independent ruler as the Nizam of Hyderabad.

A French factory was founded at Masulipatnam in 1669 after a grant from Golconda Sultanate, which was abandoned before being re-established after the French established a trading post at Yanam in 1723. The territories were ceded to the French by Muzaffar Jang Hidayat, the 3rd Nizam of Hyderabad, in 1750. In 1765, Robert Clive of the East India Company obtained a grant of four circars (administrative districts) in the Rayalaseema region from the Mughal emperor Shah Alam II and later formalised in a treaty with Nizam Ali, the 5th Nizam of Hyderabad, in 1778 to for an addition of another circar. The territories were later ceded to the British by Ali in 1800. Meanwhile, in North Andhra, Raja Vijaya Ramaraju established the Vizianagaram Estate with the help of the British support. However, after a dispute with the British, he was defeated at the Battle of Padmanabham in 1794 and the estate annexed as a tributary of the British. Following the annexation of the Carnatic Sultanate in 1801, the last major portion of present-day Andhra Pradesh came under British East India Company rule as part of Madras Presidency. The French territories changed hands multiple times between the British and the French, before they were returned to the French at the end of the Napoleonic Wars in 1817. While Masulipatnam was later taken over by the British following several rounds of territory exchanges in the late 19th century, Yanam remained with the French.

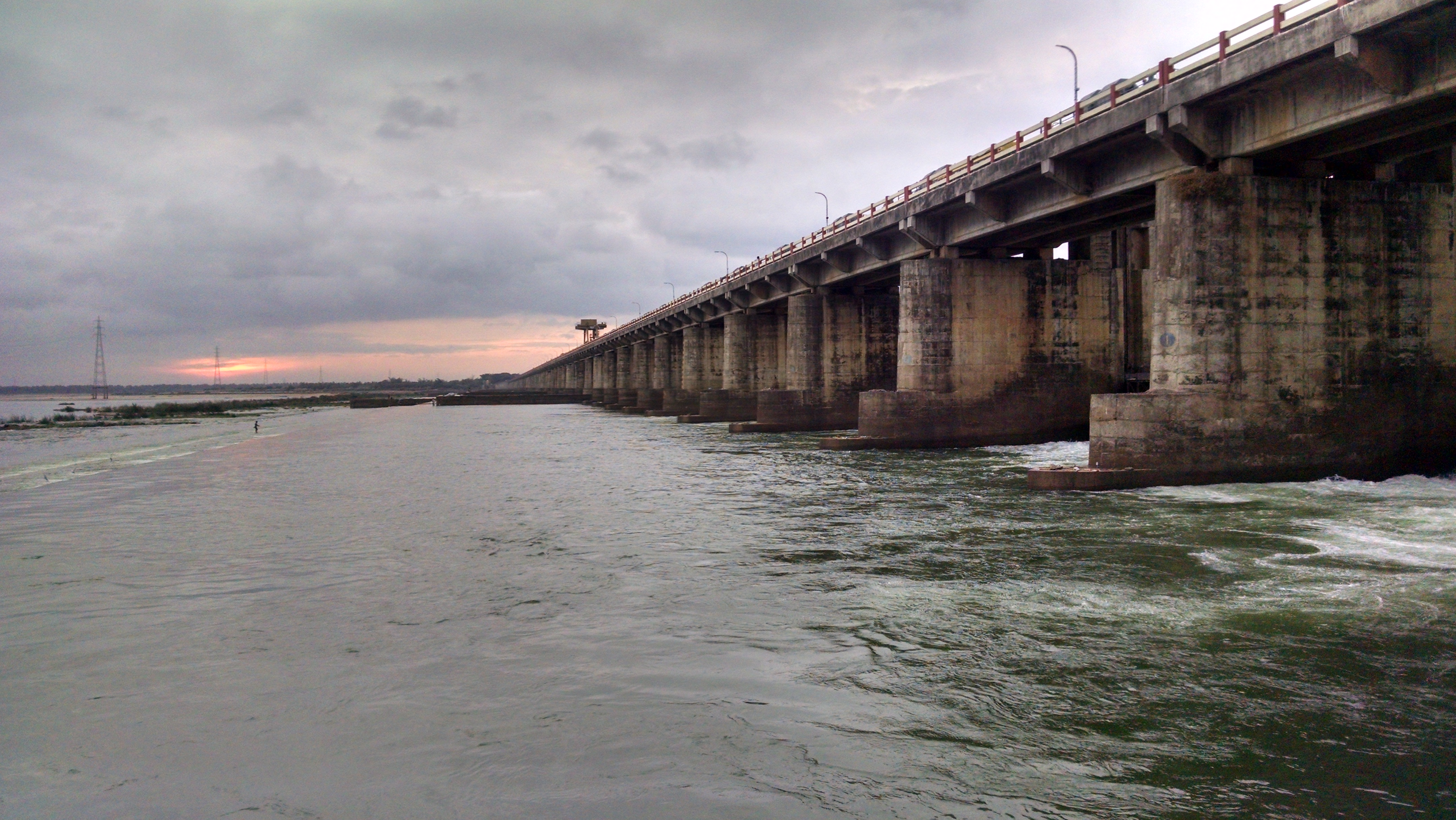
Dowleswaram Barrage built in 1850 by Arthur Cotton

After the Indian Rebellion of 1857, the region became part of the British crown. During the British Raj, several irrigation facilities and waterways were developed, including the Dowleswaram Barrage, built by Arthur Cotton. The Buckingham Canal, built between 1806 and 1878, ran parallel to the Coromandel Coast from Kakinada to Marakkanam and served as a major water transportation route. Telegraph service was initiated in 1850. Kandukuri Veeresalingam pioneered the Telugu renaissance movement which promoted the education of women and lower-caste people, opposed child marriage, dowry, and the prohibition of widow remarriage. Armed uprisings against the British were led by Uyyalawada Narasimha Reddy in the mid-19th century, and Kanneganti Hanumanthu and Alluri Sitarama Raju later mobilised farmers and Adivasis. Other prominent people involved in the struggle for independence include Tanguturi Prakasam ("Andhra Kesari"), Gadicherla Harisarvottama Rao, and Bhogaraju Pattabhi Sitaramayya. Pingali Venkayya, designed the initial tricolour flag, which was later adopted as the Indian National Flag. Durgabai Deshmukh founded the Andhra Mahila Sabha in 1937.

=== Post-Independence (1947–present) ===
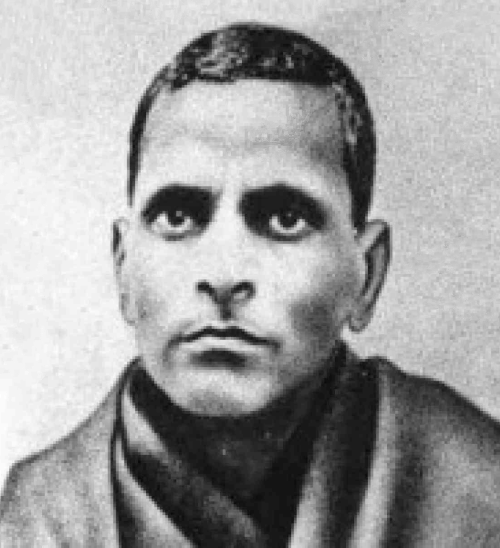
Potti Sreeramulu, whose fast unto death in 1952 led to the formation of Andhra State

After the Independence of India in 1947, the Madras Presidency became Madras State, comprising most of the present-day state of Andhra Pradesh. In November-December 1952, Potti Sreeramulu fasted to death at Madras, demanding an independent state for the Telugu-speaking people of the Madras State. On 1 October 1953, Andhra state was split from the Madras State, comprising the Telugu-speaking areas, with Kurnool as its capital. On 1 November 1956, the state was further reorganised to create Andhra Pradesh when states were redrawn linguistically in 1956, with Hyderabad as the capital.

From the 1950s, though the state experiences flucutations in growth, the region showed consistent economic and social development due to reform-oriented policies and social reforms. In 2009, the Government of India decided to bifurcate the state in response to the Telangana movement. The Samaikyandhra Movement, which protested the bifurcation, emerged in the Andhra region and led to political turmoil in the state. The Andhra Pradesh reorganisation act was subsequently passed by the Parliament of India, authorising the formation of Telangana state, despite opposition from the state legislature. The new state of Telangana came into existence on 2 June 2014 after approval from the President of India, with the residual state continuing as Andhra Pradesh. While initially Hyderabad served as the capital for both the states, in 2017, the Government of Andhra Pradesh began operating from its new capital, Amaravati. A proposal to establish three capitals–Amaravati as the legislative capital, Visakhapatnam as the executive capital, and Kurnool as the judicial capital, was proposed by the state government in 2020 and was struck down by the Andhra Pradesh High Court.

== Environment ==
=== Geography ===
Andhra Pradesh relief map

Spread over 163,275 km^{2} (63,041 sq mi), Andhra Pradesh is the seventh-largest state by area in India. It shares borders with Odisha to the northeast, Chhattisgarh to the north, Telangana to the northwest, Karnataka to the southwest, Tamil Nadu to the south, and the Bay of Bengal to the east. The enclave of Yanam, part of the union territory of Puducherry, is located along the eastern coast, bordering Kakinada district. The state has a 974 km (605 mi) coastline, the second-longest amongst the Indian states. The state comprises two regions,Coastal Andhra and Rayalaseema. The northern part of Coastal Andhra is sometimes referred to as North Andhra.

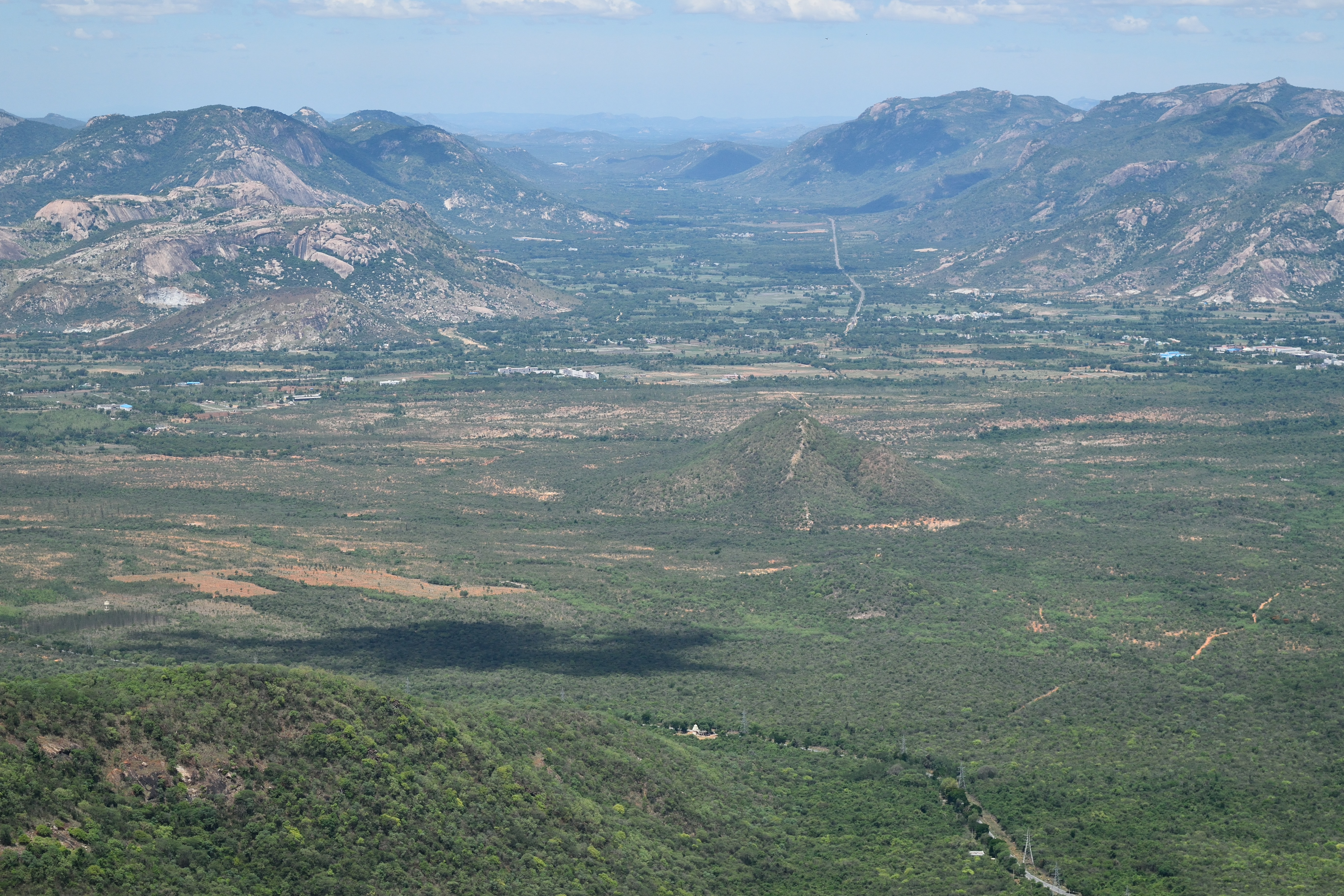
Tirumala hills of the Eastern Ghats

The Eastern Ghats, which run along the eastern coast, form a major dividing line between the coastal plains and the peneplains along the edge of the Deccan Plateau to the west. They form a discontinuous chain of mountains, dissected by several rivers and form several valleys, including the Araku Valley, and the Gandikota gorge in the Erramala hill range, through which the Penna River flows. The various sections of the Eastern Ghats are known by various names such as Nallamala Hills, Seshachalam Hills, Papi Hills, and Horsley Hills. The hills are more pronounced toward the south and extreme north of the coast. Arma Konda, located in Alluri Sitharama Raju district, is the highest peak in the state. The peneplains, which form part of the Rayalaseema region, gently slope eastwards.

The region between the Eastern Ghats and the Bay of Bengal form the Eastern Coastal Plains of the coastal Andhra. The width of the coastal plains varies across regions, and are widest in the region of the deltas formed by the rivers Godavari and Krishna. The two river deltas form a contiguous single physiographic unit and cut across a 160 km (99 mi) wide gorge in the Eastern Ghats. There are two large lakes, the Kolleru Lake, which have been pushed inwards due to these river deltas having advanced towards the Bay of Bengal, and the Pulicat Lake, which is interrupted by a sand spit which forms the island of Sriharikota. There are several sandy beaches along the coast such as Rushikonda, Mypadu, and Suryalanka.

=== Geology ===
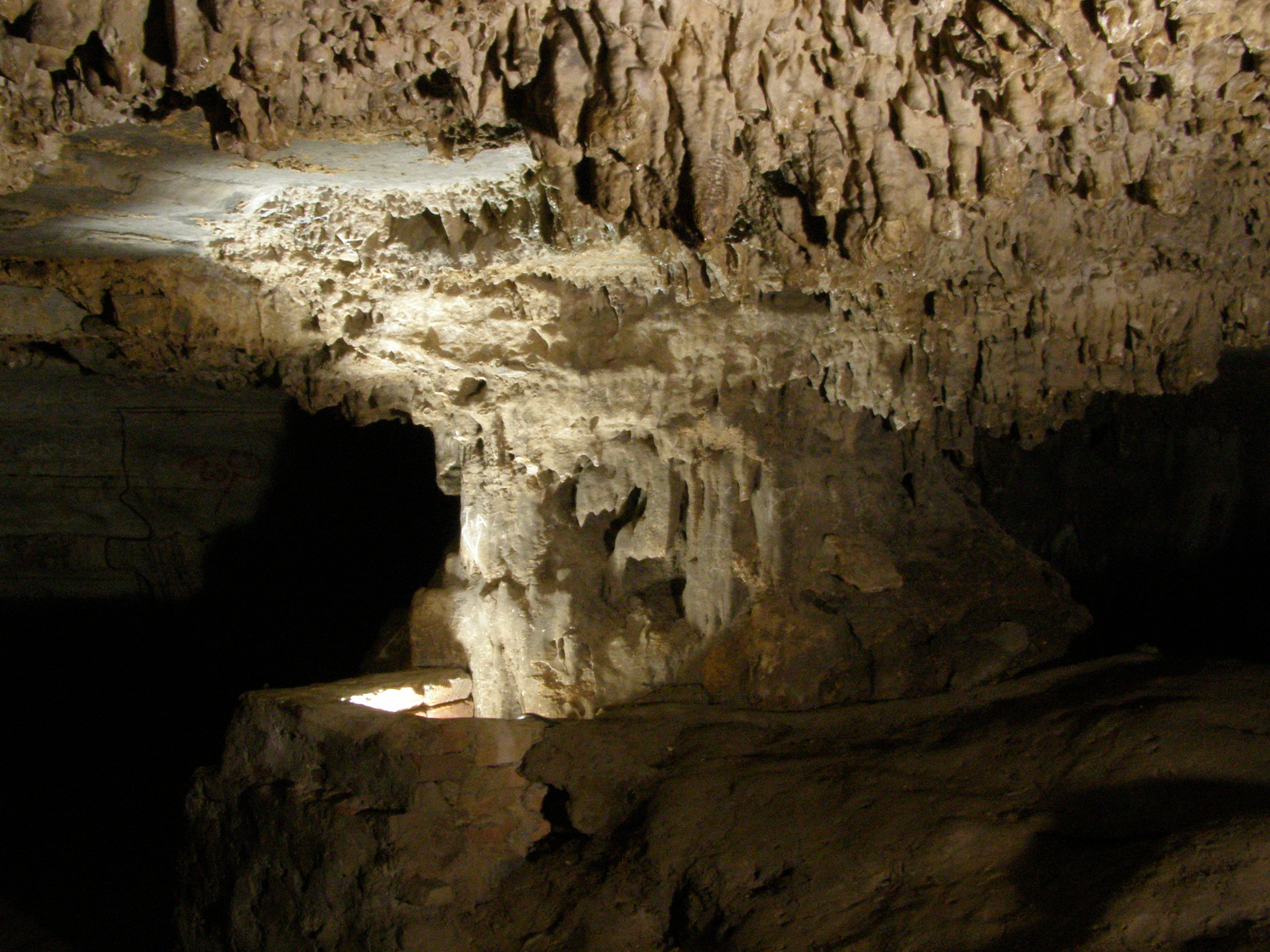
Karst formations in Belum Caves

The state has five soil types, Black, alluvial, clay, sand, and laterite. The coastal plains are very fertile due to the aluvium deposited by the rivers and are used extensively for agriculture.

The Rayalaseema region has several cave formations, including the Belum Caves, the country's second-longest cave system, and the Borra Caves are located in the Araku Valley. These cave systems were formed by persistent hyrdological erosion over millions of years, and feature extensive karst formation.

The Kadapa basin, formed by two arching branches of the Eastern Ghats, is a mineral-rich area. Major minerals found include beach sand, bauxite, limestone, granite, and diamonds, and minor minerals include barytes, calcite, and mica. The largest known uranium reserves in the country are located in Tummalapalli in Kadapa district. The state also has reserves of oil and natural gas reserves in the Godavari-Krishna basin.

=== Climate ===
Climatic zones of India

The state has five sub-agro climatic zones– North Coastal, Southern, Krishna-Godavari delta, Scarce rainfall zone of Rayalaseema, and high altitude zones. The climate varies considerably across regions. Majority of the state experiences a predominantly tropical climate. The summer lasts from March to June, and are hot and humid. Maximum summer temperatures generally exceed 35 °C (95 °F) and often surpasses 40 °C (104 °F) in the central plateau region. In the interiors, heat waves are common during the summer, with temperatures sometimes reaching above 50 °C (122 °F). The temperatures are lowest in the far southwest, with minimum still ranging above 20 °C (68 °F). Winter lasts from November to February with temperatures being slightly lower. The maximum temperature ranges from 30 to 35 °C (86 to 95 °F), except in the northeast, where the minimum may fall below 15 °C (59 °F). Lambasingi generally records the lowest temperatures, ranging from 0 to 10 °C (32 to 50 °F).

The state gets an average annual rainfall of 966 mm (38.0 in), and majority of the rainfall from July to September during the Southwest monsoon. The average rainfall widely varies from 500 to 1,500 mm (20 to 59 in) across regions. The arid zones in the west and southern areas of Rayalaseema receive the lowest rainfall. Low-pressure systems and tropical cyclones form in the Bay of Bengal during the Northeast monsoon bring rains to the southern and coastal regions of the state from October to December. The North Indian Ocean tropical cyclones occur throughout the year in the Bay of Bengal, bringing devastating winds and heavy rainfall.

=== Flora and fauna ===
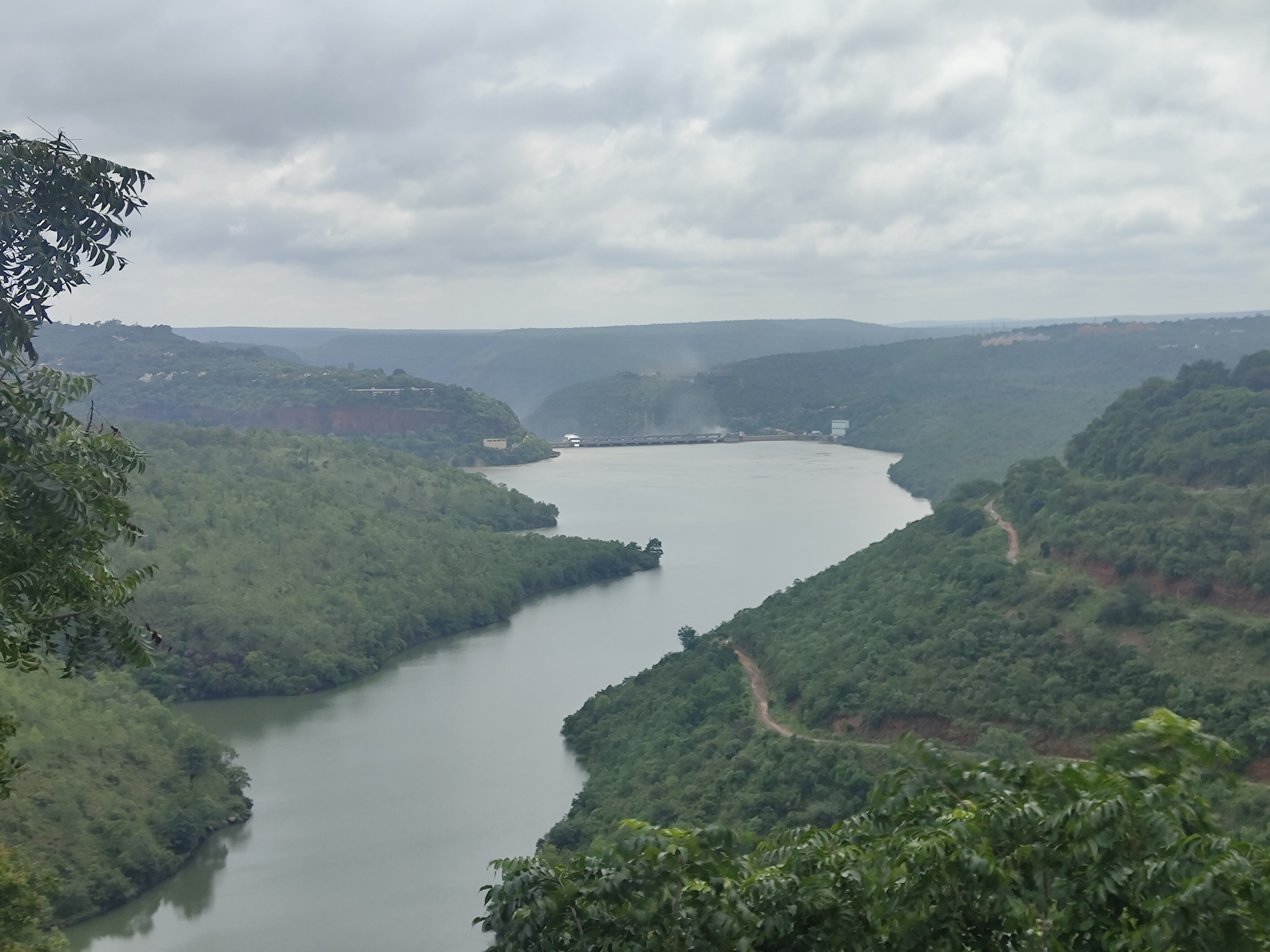
Nagarjunsagar-Srisailam Tiger Reserve

The state has a forest cover of 36,914.69 km^{2} (14,252.84 sq mi), constituting 22.46% of the total land area. The Eastern Ghats region contains dense tropical forests, while vegetation becomes sparser when transitioning to the peneplains, where dry shrub vegetation is more common. The vegetation in the state is predominantly dry deciduous with trees like Tectona, Terminalia, Dalbergia, and Pterocarpus. The state has rare and endemic plants species such as Cycas beddomei, Pterocarpus santalinus, Terminalia pallida, Syzygium alternifolium, and Shorea tumburgia. The state has 3,188.74 ha (7,879.5 acres) of mangroves in the Krishna-Godavari river basin, the second largest such system in India.

As of 2026, about 8,139.89 km^{2} (3,142.83 sq mi) of the area has been notified as protected areas. The state has a biosphere reserve at Seshachalam, three national parks and thirteen wildlife sanctuaries. The Nagarjunsagar-Srisailam Tiger Reserve, covering an area of 3,728 km^{2} (1,439 sq mi), forms part of the Project Tiger, and is the largest Tiger reserve in India. The Koundinya Sanctuary and Rayala Elephant Reserve forms part of the Project Elephant conservation programme. The Coringa Wildlife Sanctuary covers 582 km^{2} (225 sq mi) of mangrove forests and salt-tolerant forest ecosystems near the sea. Protected bird areas include Kolleru Bird Sanctuary, a Ramsar site and Nelapattu Bird Sanctuary.

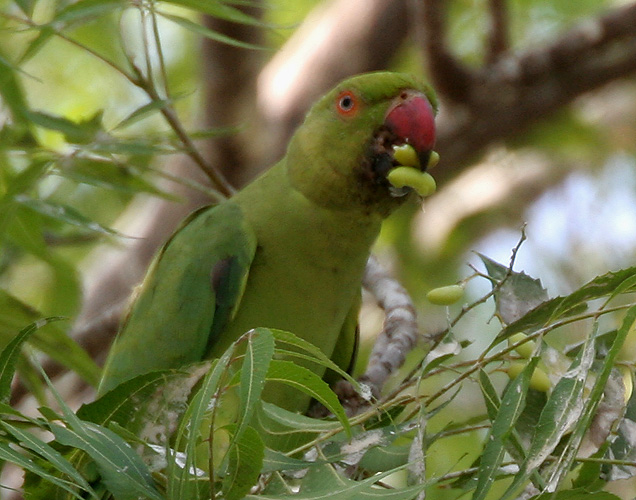
Rose-ringed parakeet feeding on neem

The fauna found in the state include Bengal tiger, Asian elephant, gaur, leopard, sloth bear, sambar, chital, mouse-deer, barking deer, wild boar, wild dog, and four-horned antelope. Smallar mammals include common langur, bonnet macaque, Indian hare, Indian porcupine, Indian giant squirrel, and Indian pangolin. Endangered and endemic species include Jerdon's courser, golden gecko, and slender loris. The estuaries of the Godavari and Krishna rivers support mangrove forests, with fishing cats and otters as keystone species.

The bird species found in the state include Asian open-billed stork, black ibis, black kite, black-shouldered kite, cattle egret, common pochard, common teal, darter, gadwall, great cormorant, great Indian bustard, grey heron, Indian peafowl, Indian pond heron, lesser florican, lesser whistling duck, little cormorant, northern pintail, painted stork, purple heron, red-crested pochard, spot-billed duck, and white ibis. Reptile species include bamboo pit viper, Leschenault's leaf-toed gecko, brown vine snake, checkered keelback, common garden lizard, common krait, common skink, forest calotes, golden gecko, green vine snake, house gecko, Indian chameleon, Indian cobra, Bengal monitor, Indian python, marsh crocodile, rainbow water snake, red-crested pochard, Russell's viper, saw-scaled viper, Indian star tortoise, and yellow-collared wolf snake.

Symbols of Andhra Pradesh
Animal	Bird	Tree	Fruit	Flower
Blackbuck (Antilope cervicapra)	Rose-ringed parakeet (Psittacula krameri)	Neem (Azadirachta indica)	Mango (Mangifera indica)	Jasmine (Jasminum officinale)

== Demographics ==
According to the 2011 Census of India, Andhra Pradesh had a population of 49,577,103 with a density of 304/km^{2} (790/sq mi). The rural population accounted for 70.53% and the urban population accounted for the remaining 29.47%. About 10.6% of the population were below the age of six years. Scheduled Castes and Scheduled Tribes constituted 22.61% of the population. The state had a sex ratio of 997 females per 1000 males, higher than the national average of 926 per 1000. The literacy rate was 67.35%, with West Godavari district recording the highest literacy rate of 74.32%, and the Vizianagaram district having the lowest literary rate of 58.89%. As of 2022, the state had a Human Development Index of 0.673. As of 1 January 2023, there were 39,984,868 registered voters, including 3,924 third gender voters. Kurnool district had the maximum number of voters at 1,942,233, while Alluri Sitharama Raju district had the lowest registered voters at 729,085.

=== Language ===
Languages of Andhra Pradesh (2011) (Note: Based on 2011 census, excluding the regions which became part of Telangana later.)
Language	Percent
Telugu	89.21%
Urdu	6.55%
Tamil	1.04%
Other or not stated	3.2%

Telugu is the official language of the state, with Urdu designated as the second official language. Telugu is the most spoken language and serves as the mother tongue of 89.21% of the population, followed by Urdu (6.55%) and Tamil (1.04%). Kannada and Odia are spoken by a minor population, and Lambadi and other languages are spoken by the tribal people. According to the Indian readership survey in 2019, 19% of the population aged 12 years and older could read and understand English.

=== Religion and ethnicity ===
According to the 2011 census, Hindus formed the majority with 90.89% of the population adhering to the religion, followed by Muslims (7.30%), and Christians (1.38%). Popular Hindu pilgrimage destinations include the Venkateswara temple at Tirumala, the Mallikarjuna temple at Srisailam, Kanaka Durga Temple at Vijayawada, and the Varaha Lakshmi Narasimha temple at Simhachalam. Buddhist religious sites include Amaravati and Nagarjuna Konda.

There were 104 castes which were classified as Other Backward Classes, 59 Scheduled Castes and 34 Scheduled Tribes. Brahmin, Kamma, Kapu, Komati, Raju, Reddy, and Velama communities are classified as forward castes in the state.

=== Cities and towns ===
As per the 2011 census, the state had an urban population of 14.9 million. Visakhapatnam and Vijayawada are the largest cities, and are the only urban agglomerations with more than a million inhabitants.

Most populous urban agglomerations (2011)
Urban agglomeration	District(s)	Population (2011)
Visakhapatnam	Visakhapatnam, Anakapalli	1,728,128
Vijayawada	NTR	1,476,931
Guntur	Guntur	743,354
Nellore	Nellore	558,548
Kurnool	Kurnool	484,327
Rajamahendravaram	East Godavari	476,873
Tirupati	Tirpuati	461,900
Kakinada	Kakinada	443,028
Kadapa	Kadapa	344,893
Anantapur	Anantapur	340,613

== Culture ==
=== Clothing ===
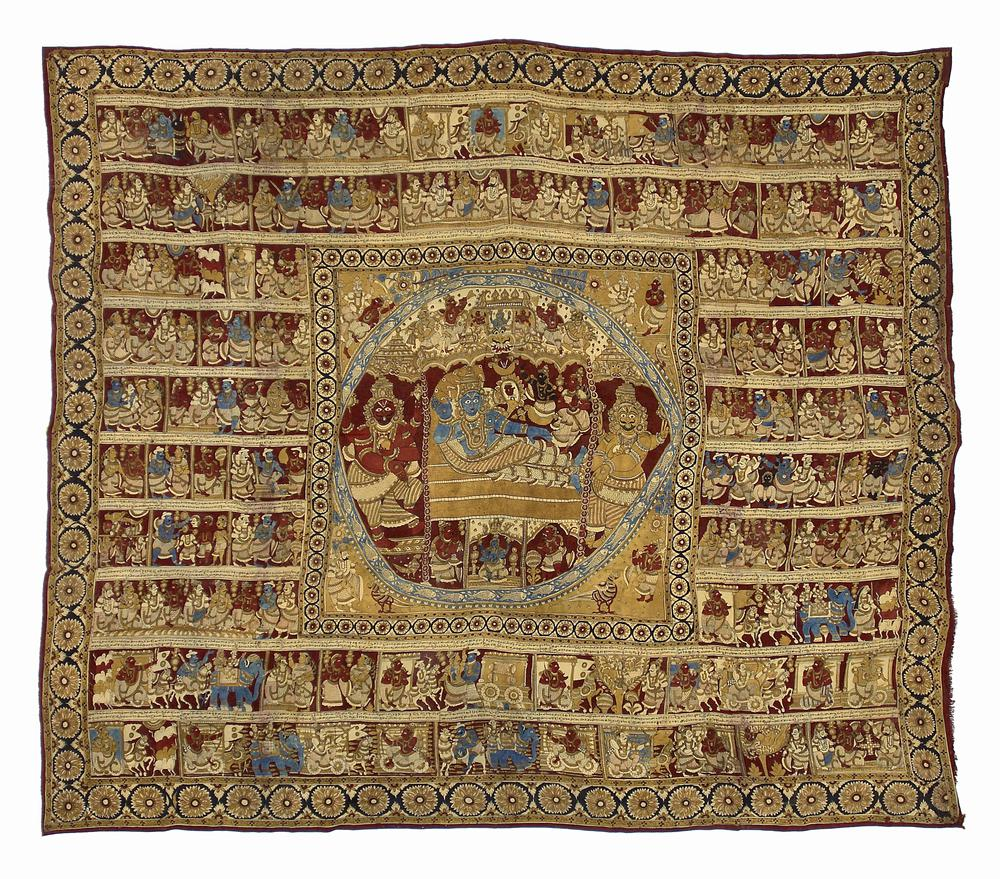
Kalamkari artwork on a cloth

The men's traditional wear consists of panche, a 4.5 m (15 ft) long, rectangular piece of non-stitched white cloth often bordered in brightly coloured stripes. Women traditionally wear a sari, a garment that consists of a drape varying from 5 to 9 yd (4.6 to 8.2 m) in length and 2 to 4 ft (0.61 to 1.22 m) in breadth. It is typically wrapped around the waist, with one end draped over the shoulder, baring the midriff, as according to Indian philosophy, the navel is considered as the source of life and creativity. Women wear colourful silk saris on special occasions such as marriages. The traditional wear of young girls consists of a long skirt with an over cloth (half-sari) worn over a blouse. People in urban areas generally wear tailored clothing, and western dress is popular. Western-style school uniforms are worn by both boys and girls in schools, even in rural areas.

Kalamkari is a textile printing art, that originated in the state. It uses natural dyes, and the hand painting technique is used in Srikalahasti Kalamkari, while the Pedana Kalamkari uses block painting. Dharmavaram silk saris, Pedana, and Srikalahasti Kalamkari handicrafts are recognised as geographical indications.

=== Cuisine ===
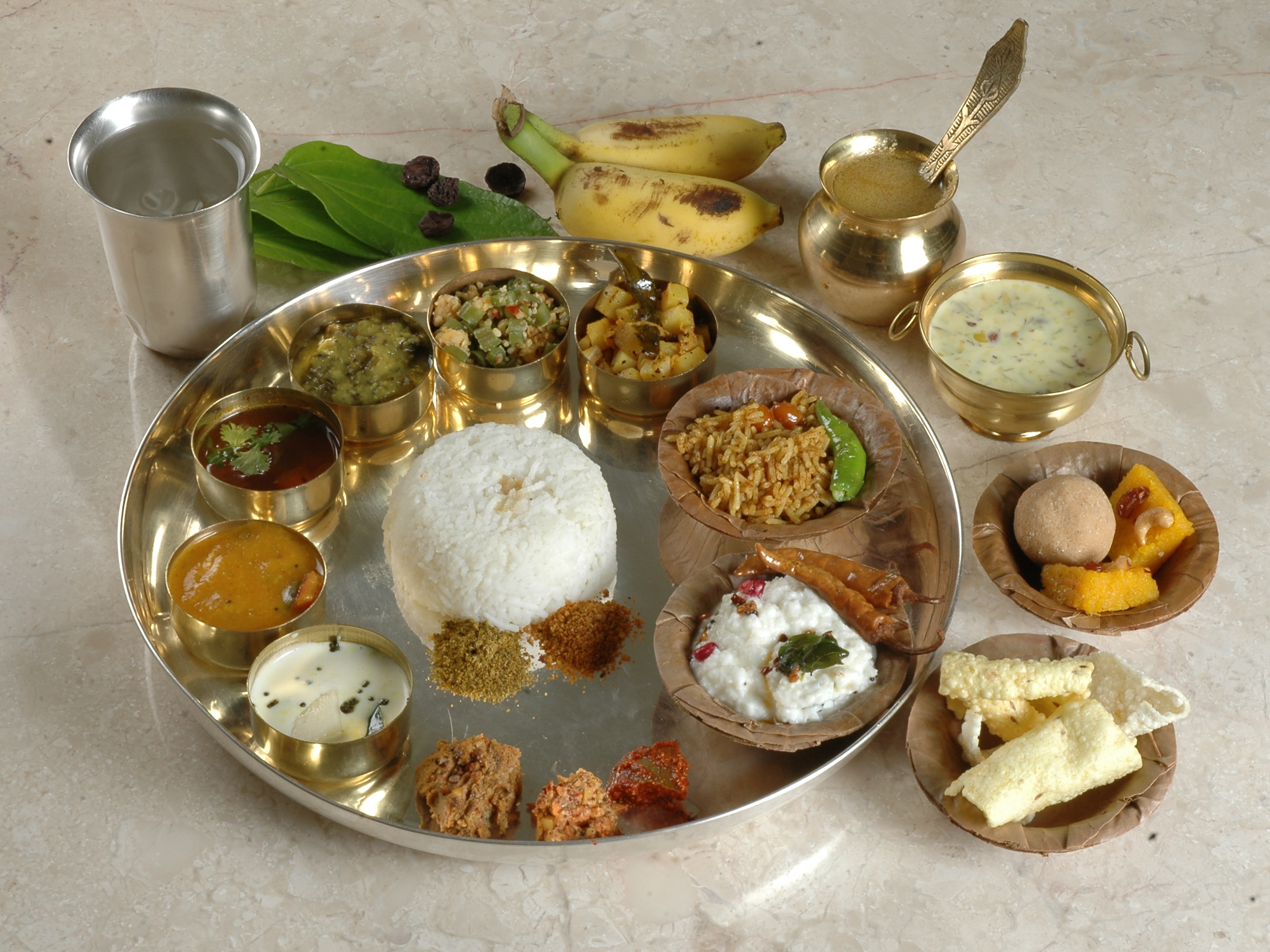
Full-course vegetarian Andhra meal

The Andhra cuisine incorporates spicy, tangy, and sweet flavours. Chillies, curry leaves, tamarind, gongura leaves, and spices are commonly used ingredients. Rice is the staple food, and is served with other accompaniments during a meal. These include pappu is a type of dal-based food item that, made using lentils in combination with vegetables such as tomato, spinach, gongura, or ridge gourd, and charu, a type of watery soup made with tamarind juice and spices. It is served with traditional curries, and a pulusu, a stew made using tamarind juice in combination with vegetables or meat. Other accompaniments include pachadi, a paste usually made with a combination of groundnuts, fried vegetables, and chillies, and pickles made using raw mangoes, gooseberries, or lemons. Buttermilk or curd is eaten towards the end of the meal to soothe the body, especially after eating spicy food items earlier.

Pulihora is rice based dish made with from a mixture of thick sauce of tamarind, chillies, and asafoetida, and tempered with mustard, curry leaves, and peanuts. It is often offered to Hindu gods and then served as a prasadam (divine offering) in the temples. Popular vegetarian curries include dondakaya koora (ivy gourd cooked with coconut and green chilli) and guttivankaya koora(stuffed egg plant curry). Thalakaya koora (lamb head curry), royyala koora (prawns curry), and Natukodi koora (chicken curry) are popular non-vegetarian dishes in the coastal regions. Biryani types popular in Rayalaseema region include yeta mamsam kobbari (mutton), seema kodi (chicken), Chennuru dum biryani, and Gongura mamsam (mutton with gongura). Pulasa pulusu is a thick aromatic and tangy gravy made from the Godavari pulasa fish in Konaseema.

Ariselu, burelu, laddu, and pootharekulu are some of the sweets made for special festivals and occasions. Pootharekulu is made from sugar and rice flour. Other sweets include taandri, which is a mango-flavoured sun-dried fruit jelly and khaaja, a multi layered, flour-based, deep fried sweet dipped in sugar syrup. Bandar laddu and Tirupati laddu have been accorded geographical indication status.

=== Literature ===
The earliest Telugu writings come from inscriptions dates to the early Middle Ages. Inscriptions dated to 6th to 8th century indicate the evolution of Telugu as a separate language, with inscriptions from 8th to 10th centuries depict a more evolved form of the language used in poems and verses. The 6th or 7th century Sanskrit text Janashrayi-Chhandovichiti deals with the metres used in Telugu, including some metres that are not found in Sanskrit prosody.

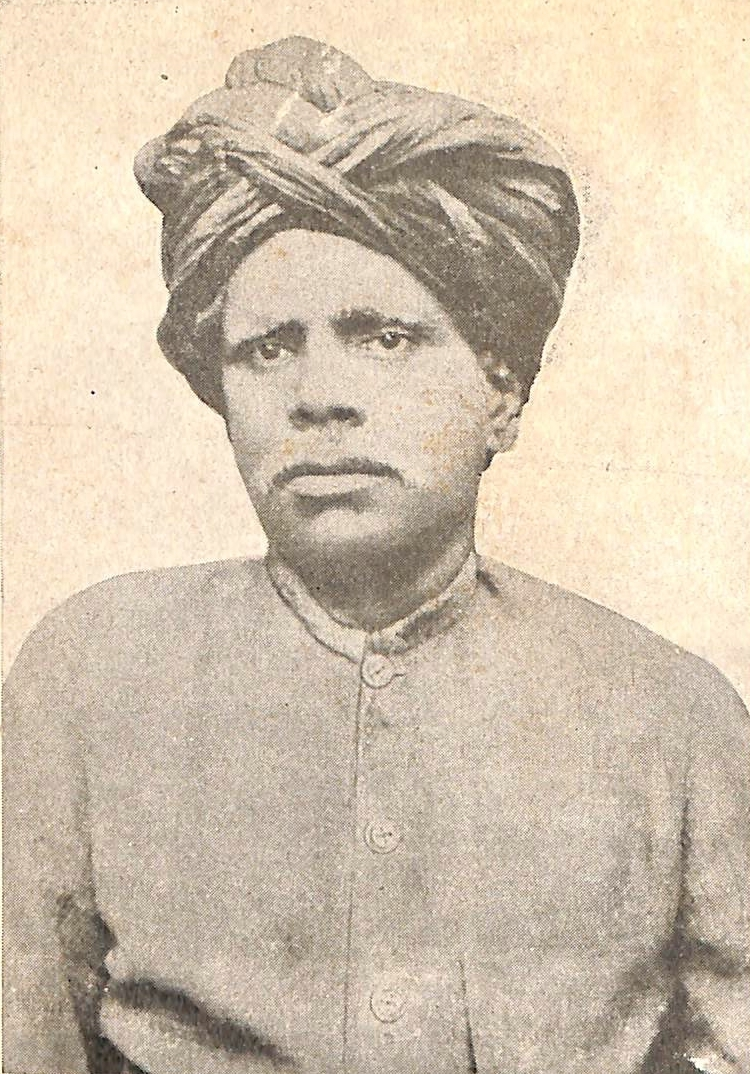
Kandukuri Veeresalingam, the father of the Telugu renaissance movement

Nannayya, who lived in the 11th century wrote the first treatise on Telugu grammar, called Andhra Shabda Chintamani in Sanskrit. He started translating the Hindu epic of Mahabharata. The translation was continued by Tikkana in the 13th century, and was completed by Yerrapragada in the 14th century. There was a rise in several Shaivism related texts during the 12th and 13th centuries. Most prominent from the period include Mallikarjuna Panditaradhya, the author of Sivatatva Saram, Palkuriki Somanatha, the author of Basava Purana and other works, Yadavakula Annamayya, the author of Sarveswara Salakam, and Nanne Choda, who wrote Kumarasambhavam. The Ramayana became popular in the 13th century, and the earliest Telugu translation was the Ranganatha Ramayanam by Gona Budda Reddy in 1250. Pothana translated Bhagavatam into Telugu in the 15th century. The Prabandha genre of Telugu literature flourished during the 16th century. The Ashtadiggajas were the eight prominent scholars and poets in the court of Krishnadevaraya. These included Allasani Peddana, Nandi Thimmana, Madayyagari Mallana, Dhurjati, Ayyalaraju Ramambhadrudu, Pingali Surana, Ramarajabhushanudu, and Tenali Ramakrishna. Vemana was an Indian philosopher, who wrote Telugu poems using simple language and native idioms on a variety of subjects including yoga, wisdom, and morality in the 17th century. Potuluri Veerabrahmam, a clairvoyant and social reformer of 17th century, wrote Kalagnanam, a book of predictions.

Veeresalingam, who pioneered the Telugu renaissance movement, brought about changes to the Telugu literature and education in the late 19th century. Telugu literature after the period is termed Adhunika Telugu Sahityam (modern Telugu literature). He was the author of the first Telugu social novel Rajasekhara Charitram, published in 1880. Other contemporary poets from this period include Korada Ramachandra Sastri and Gurazada Srirama Murty. During the period, Charles Philip Brown conducted pioneering work in bringing Telugu into the print era. The use of colloquial idiom rather than grandhik (classical) in literature was championed by Gurajada Apparao and Gidugu Venkata Ramamurthy. Various forms of literature such as poetry, novel, short story evolved in response to social developments during the period. Rayaprolu Subba Rao, Gurram Jashuva, Viswanatha Satyanarayana, Devulapalli Krishnasastri, and Sri Sri were some of the Telugu poets from the period. Palagummi Padmaraju's short story Galivaana won second prize in World Short Story competition in 1952. Rachakonda Viswanatha Sastry initiated a new trend by focussing on the downtrodden in his novel Raju-Mahishi. Women writers such as Malathi Chendur and Ranganayakamma wrote several novels in the 1950s and 1960s. In the late 1970s, Yandamuri Veerendranath started writing popular novels which were serialised in magazines. Viswanatha Satyanarayana was conferred the first Jnanpith Award for Telugu literature in 1970.

=== Architecture ===
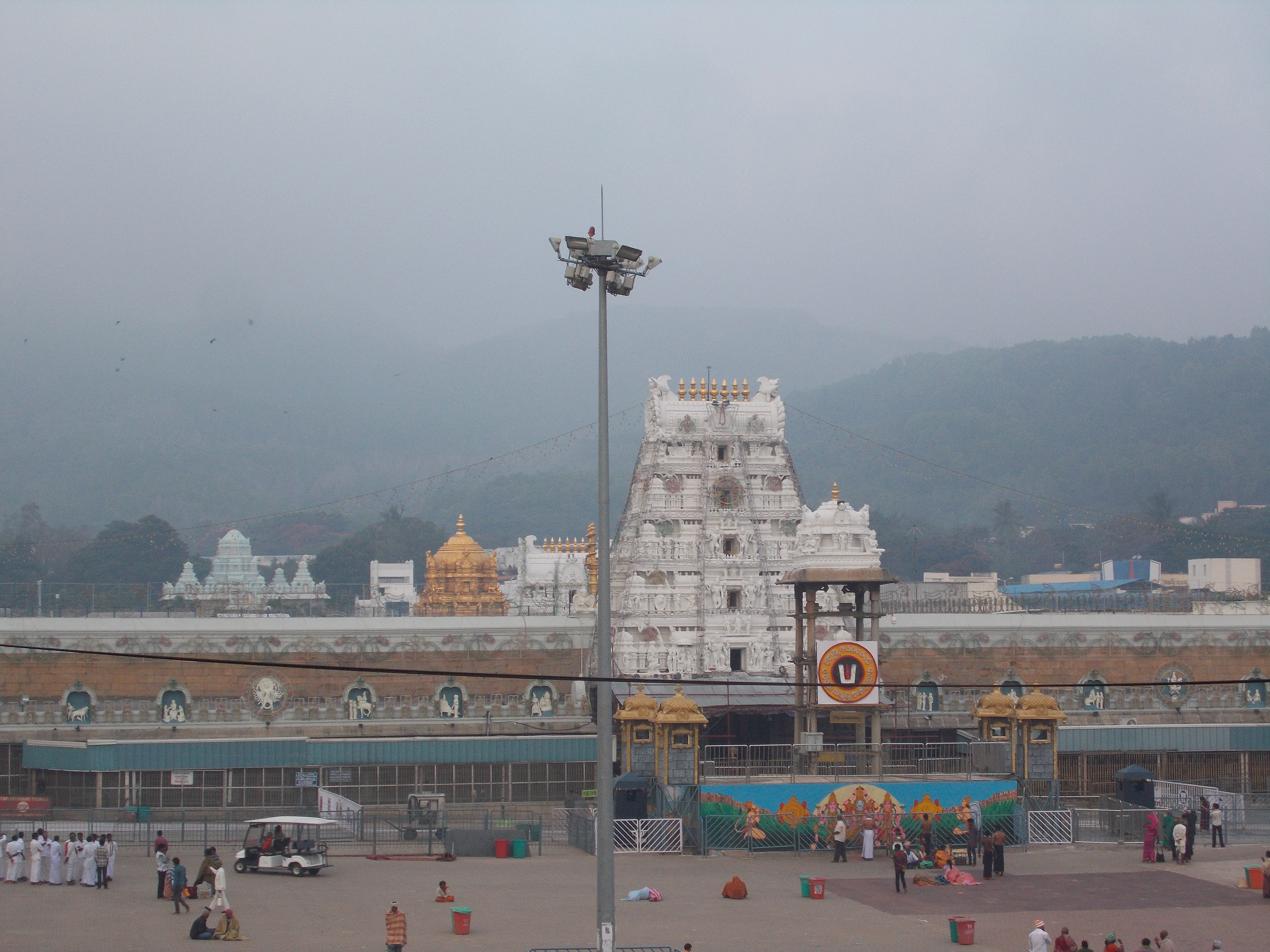
Venkateswara Temple, Tirumala, with the gopuram in the foreground and the gold-plated vimana in the background

Traditional temple architecture in the state is influenced by Dravidian and Vijayanagara architecture. In Dravidian architecture, the temples consist of porches or mantapas preceding the door leading to the sanctum, gate-pyramids or gopurams in quadrangular enclosures that surround the temple, and pillared halls. Besides these, the temple usually has a tank called the kalyani or pushkarni. The gopuram is a monumental tower, usually ornate at the entrance of the temple and forms a prominent feature. They are topped by the kalasam, a bulbous stone finial and function as gateways through the walls that surround the temple complex. Vimanam are similar structures built over the garbhagriha or inner sanctum of the temple but are usually smaller than the gopurams. In the Vijayanagar style, the temple consists of three parts, the assembly hall known as the mukha mantapa, arda mantapa or antarala (ante chamber), and the garbhagriha or the sanctum sanctorum. The civic architecture which featured round houses with elaborate courtyards is giving way to smaller apartments in the 21st century.

=== Arts ===
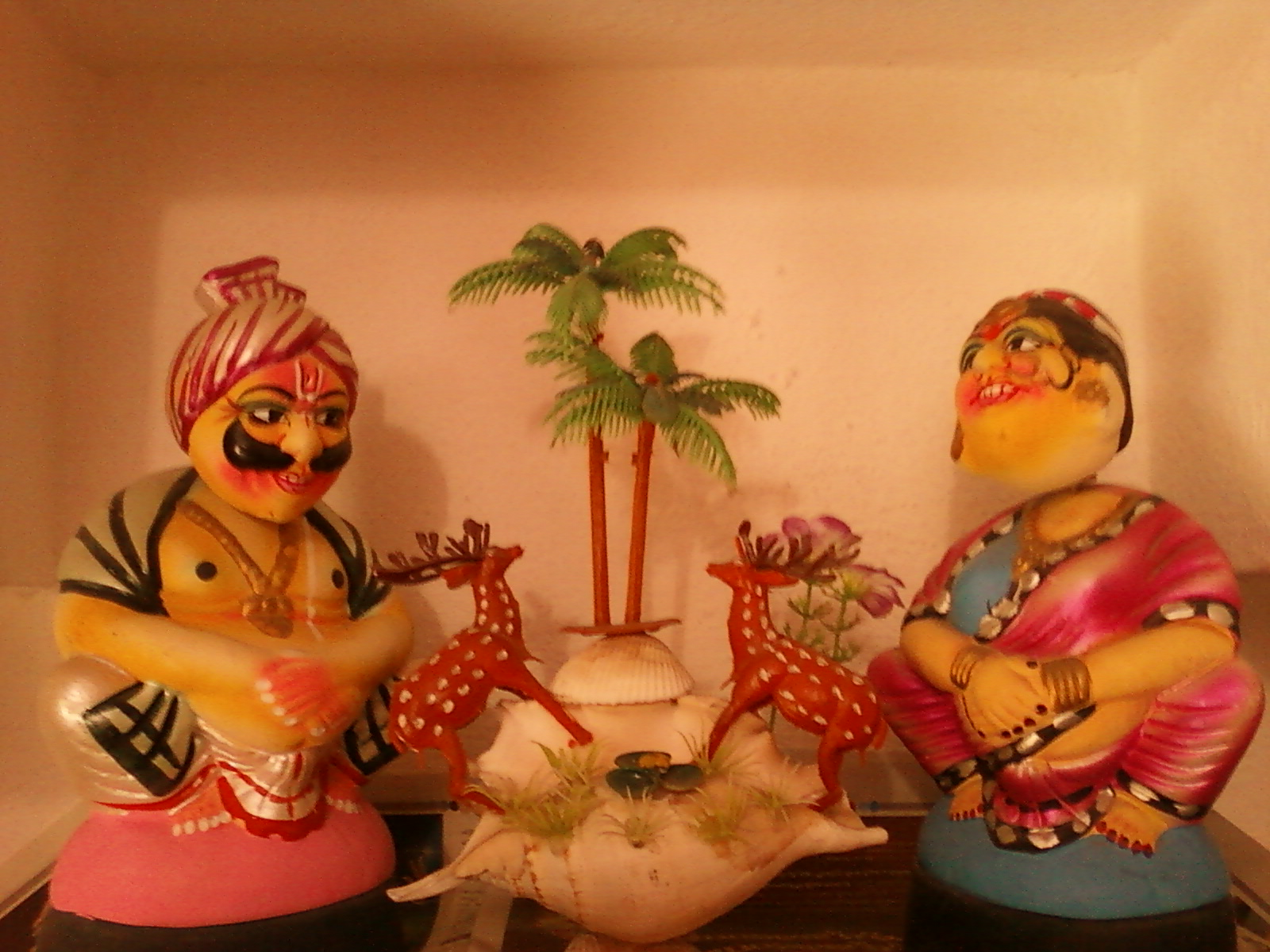
Kondapalli Toys

Kuchipudi is an Indian classical dance form that originated in the village of Kuchipudi in Krishna district. Andhra Natyam is another traditional dance form that originated from Hindu temple dance. Kolannalu is a folk dance form usually performed by women using two short wooden sticks, one in each hand. Tholu bommalata is a shadow puppet theatre tradition of the state. Kondapalli Toys, the soft limestone idol carvings from Durgi, and Etikoppaka lacquered wooden toys are unique traditional arts that have been recognised as geographical indications.

Harikatha involves the narration of Hindu mythological stories along with songs. Burra katha is an oral storytelling art form in which Hindu mythological stories or contemporary social issues are narrated with music. Veethi Bhagavathamu is another form of street theatre. Drama is a popular theatre art performed with folk stories or themes based on contemporary issues. Kanyasulkam, written by Gurajada Apparao and presented in 1892, was the first Telugu drama to portray social issues. Composers of Carnatic music like Annamacharya, Kshetrayya, Tyagaraja, and Bhadrachala Ramadasu hailed from the region. Sannai and Dolu are common traditional musical instruments played during functions.

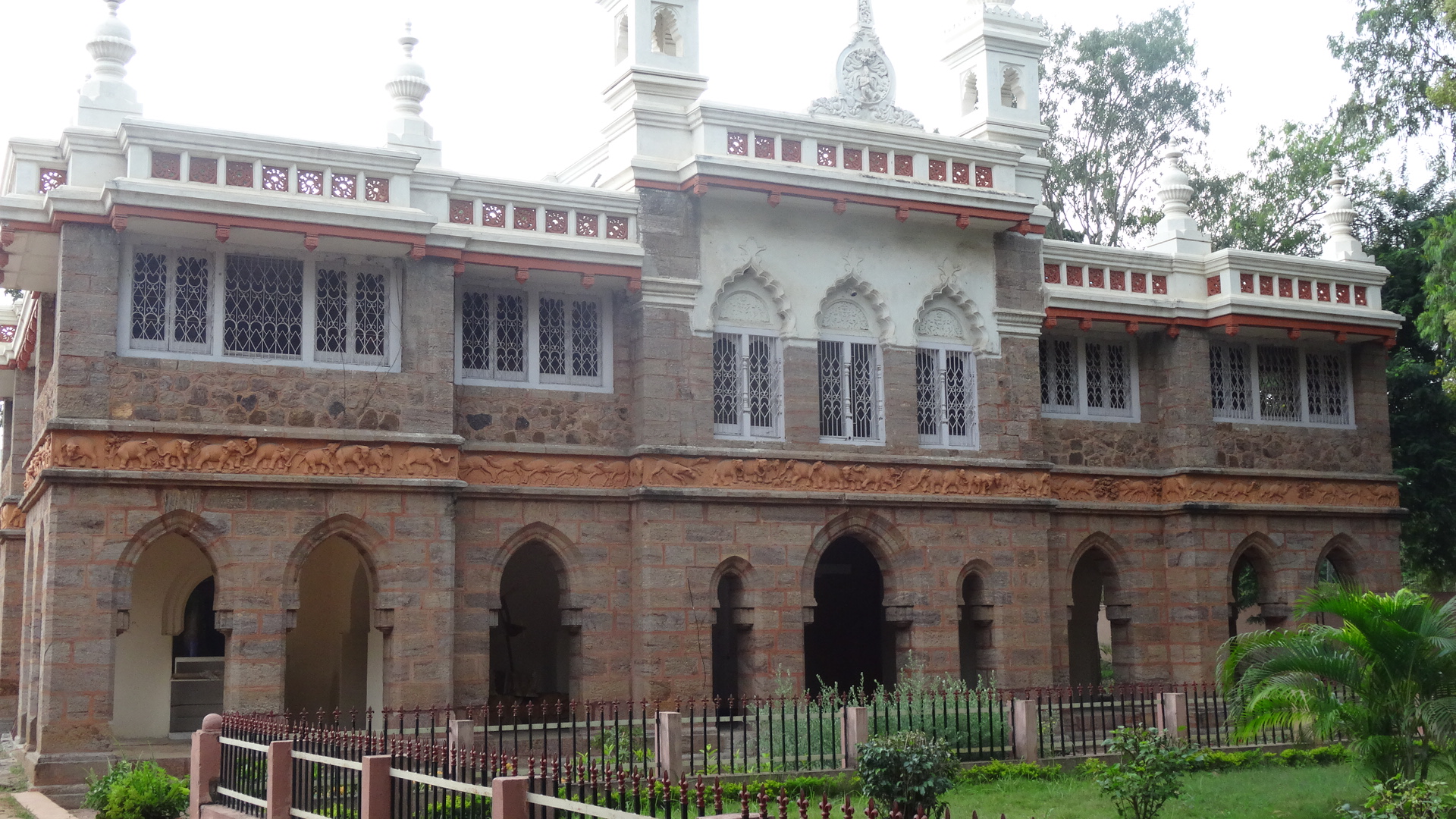
Bapu Museum, Vijayawada

There are 32 museums in the state featuring various collections. The Amaravathi archaeological museum displays art traditions of Amaravathi and images of Buddha. The Bapu Museum, Vijayawada houses historical artefacts. Telugu Samskruthika Niketanam in Visakhapatnam displays artefacts related to Telugu culture and history. The Archaeological Survey of India manages 135 protected monuments in the state.

Though the Telugu film industry, known as "Tollywood", is primarily based in Hyderabad, several films are shot across the state. Efforts have been made in the 2020s to encourage the Telugu film industry in the state. C. Pullaiah is cited as the father of the Telugu cinema. Film producer D. Ramanaidu holds a Guinness record for the most films produced by a person. Popular playback singers from the state include S. P. Balasubrahmanyam, P. Susheela, and S. Janaki.

=== Festivals ===
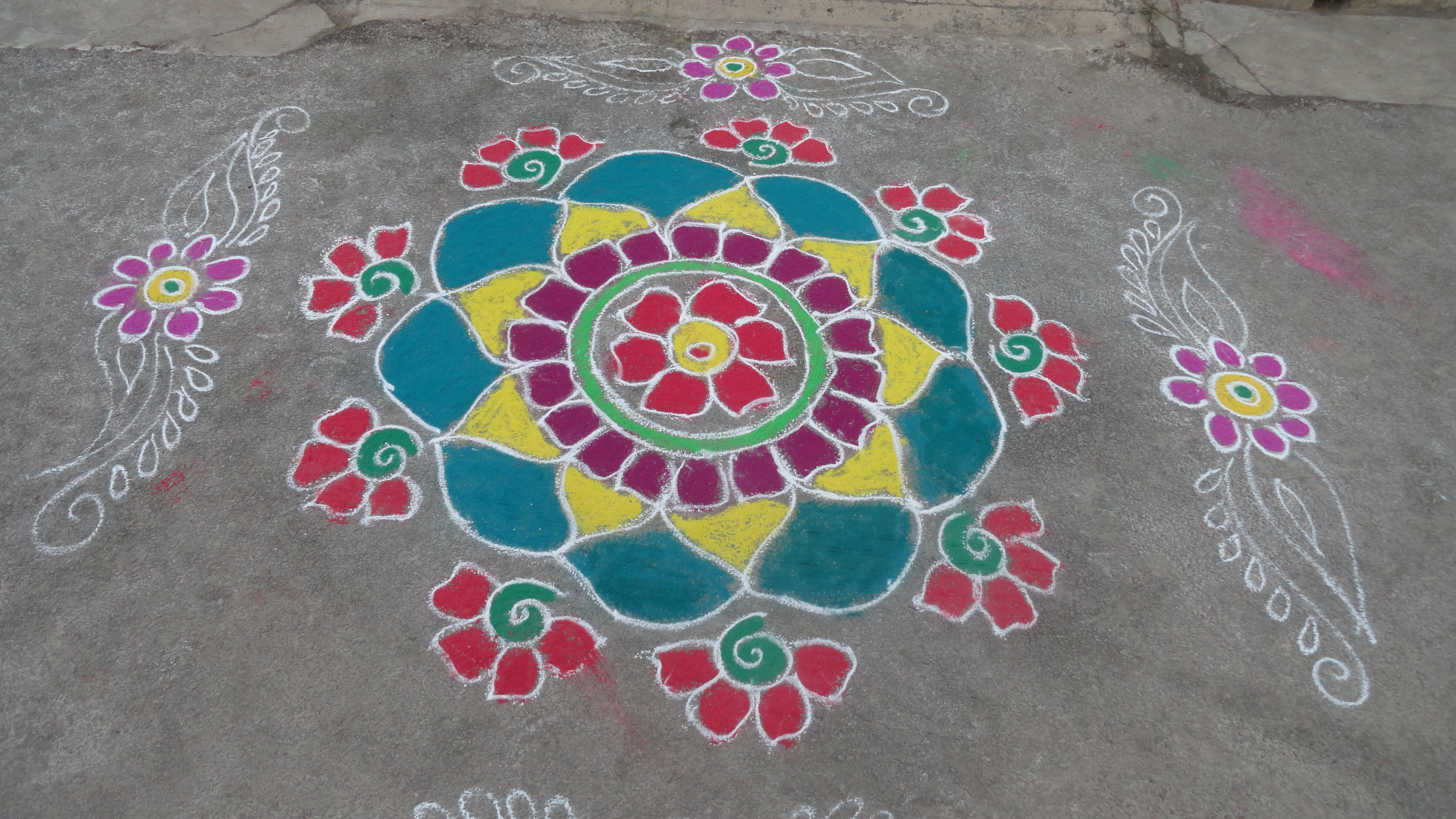
People decorate their homes with colourful geometric designs called muggulu

Sankranti is the major harvest festival celebrated across the state. It is dedicated to the Sun deity Surya and marks the end of winter solstice. It is traditionally a four-day festival, and people heir homes with colourful geometric designs called muggulu made from rice powder.

The first day of the Telugu new year is celebrated as Ugadi which occurs during March/April on the Gregorian calendar. On the day, people prepare and share pickles (pachhadi) made from raw mangoes, neem flowers, pepper powder, jaggery, and tamarind. The pickle which is a mix of different tastes is meant to represent the difference experiences in life. Celebrations end with the recitation of the astrological predictions for the incoming year known as Panchanga sravanam.

Other major Hindu festivals celebrated in the state include Vijayadashami, Deepavali, Ratha Saptami, Krishna Janmashtami, Vinayaka Chaturthi, Mahashivratri, and Vaikunta Ekadasi. Islamic festivals include Eid, and Rottela Panduga celebrated at Bara Shaheed Dargah. Christians festivals include Good Friday, Easter, and Christmas.

== Administration and politics ==
=== Administration ===
Districts of Andhra Pradesh

Amravati is the capital of the state and houses the state executive, legislative and head of judiciary. There are 41 departments of the state and the departments have further sub-divisions which may govern various undertakings and boards. The state is divided into 28 districts, each of which is administered by a District Collector. For land administration, these are further divided into 82 revenue divisions, administered by Revenue Divisional Officers which comprise 688 mandals administered by Tehsildars.

The local administration consists of a single tier system for urban areas, which are governed by either of the three types of urban bodies–municipal corporation, municipality or nagar panchayat, based on revenue and population. As of 2026, there are 123 urban local bodies including 17 municipal corporations, 88 municipalities, and 18 nagar panchayats in the state. The rural administration consists of a three-tier Panchayati Raj system with the zilla parishad at the district level, mandal parishad at the intermediate (block) level, and gram panchayats at the village level. As of 2026, there are 26 zilla parishads, 676 mandal parishads, and 13,351 gram panchayats, administered by village administrative officers.

=== Legislature ===
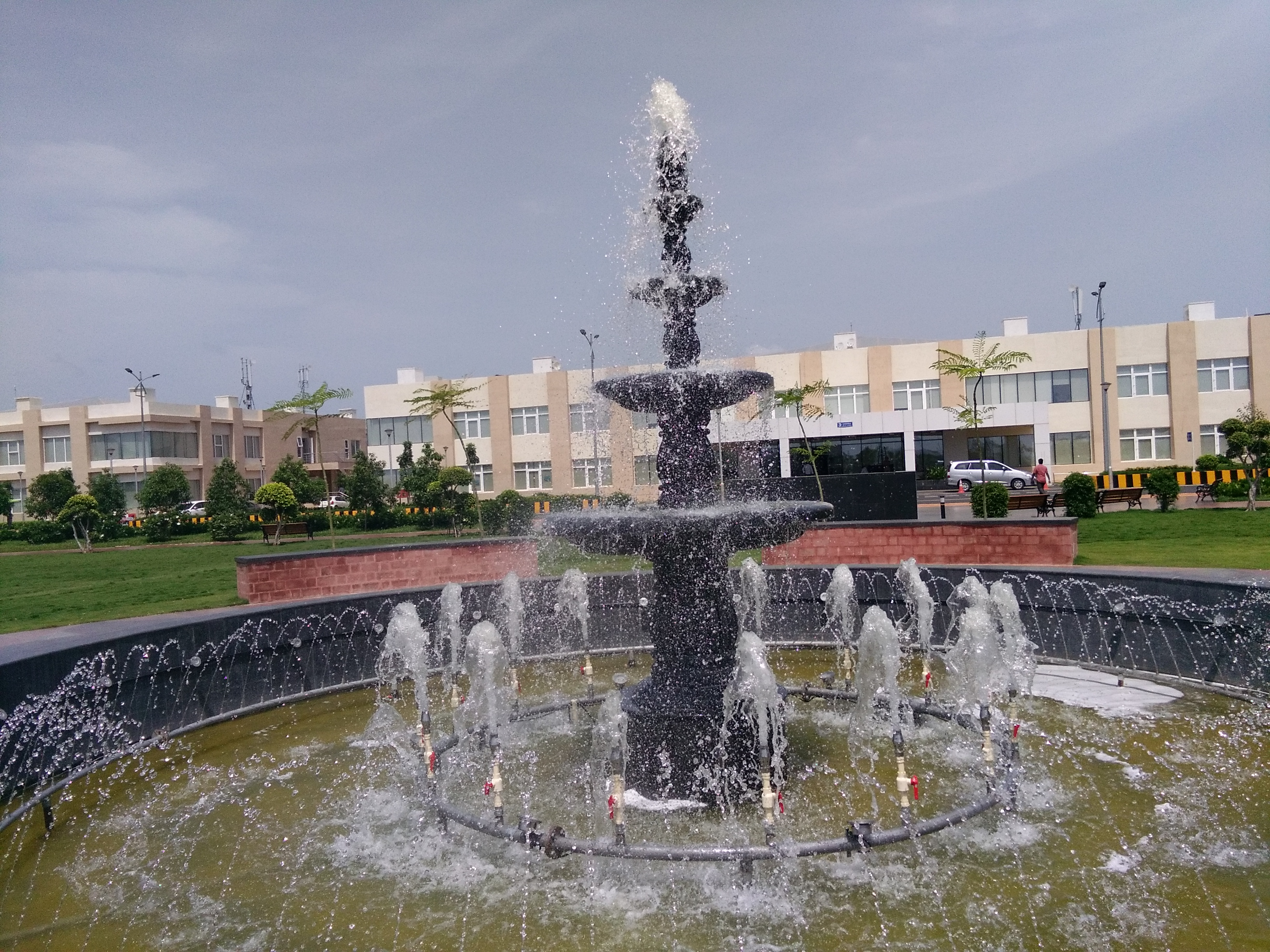
Secretariat buildings hosting legislative assembly and council, Amaravati

In accordance with the Constitution of India, the governor is a state's de jure head and appoints the chief minister who has the de facto executive authority. The state has a bicameral legislature with the Andhra Pradesh Legislative Council, with 58 members, functioning as the upper house. There are 175 assembly constituencies in the state each of which elects a member to the Andhra Pradesh Legislative Assembly, which is the lower house. The state has 11 seats in the Rajya Sabha, the upper house of the Parliament of India, and elects 25 members to the Lok Sabha, the lower house.

=== Financials ===
For 2024–25, the government had total receipts of ₹2,693.14 billion (US$29 billion). The net receipt was ₹1,681.21 billion (US$18 billion) after accounting for ₹1,101.93 billion (US$12 billion) of loans. The net expenditure was ₹2,491.34 billion (US$27 billion), with the fiscal deficit at ₹810.13 billion (US$8.7 billion), which was 5.1% of the state GDP. The revenue consisted of ₹894.35 billion (US$9.6 billion) of state taxes, ₹597.2 billion (US$6.4 billion) of non-tax revenue, ₹520.8 billion (US$5.6 billion) as state's share from central taxes, and ₹201.88 billion (US$2.2 billion) from central government aid and grants. The allocation to government departments contributed to 61% of the state's expenditure, followed by 24% for salaries and pension. Welfare of backward communities and minorities was allocated the greatest share of ₹361.6 billion (US$3.9 billion), followed by education, sports, and culture at ₹296.1 billion (US$3.2 billion).

=== Law and order ===
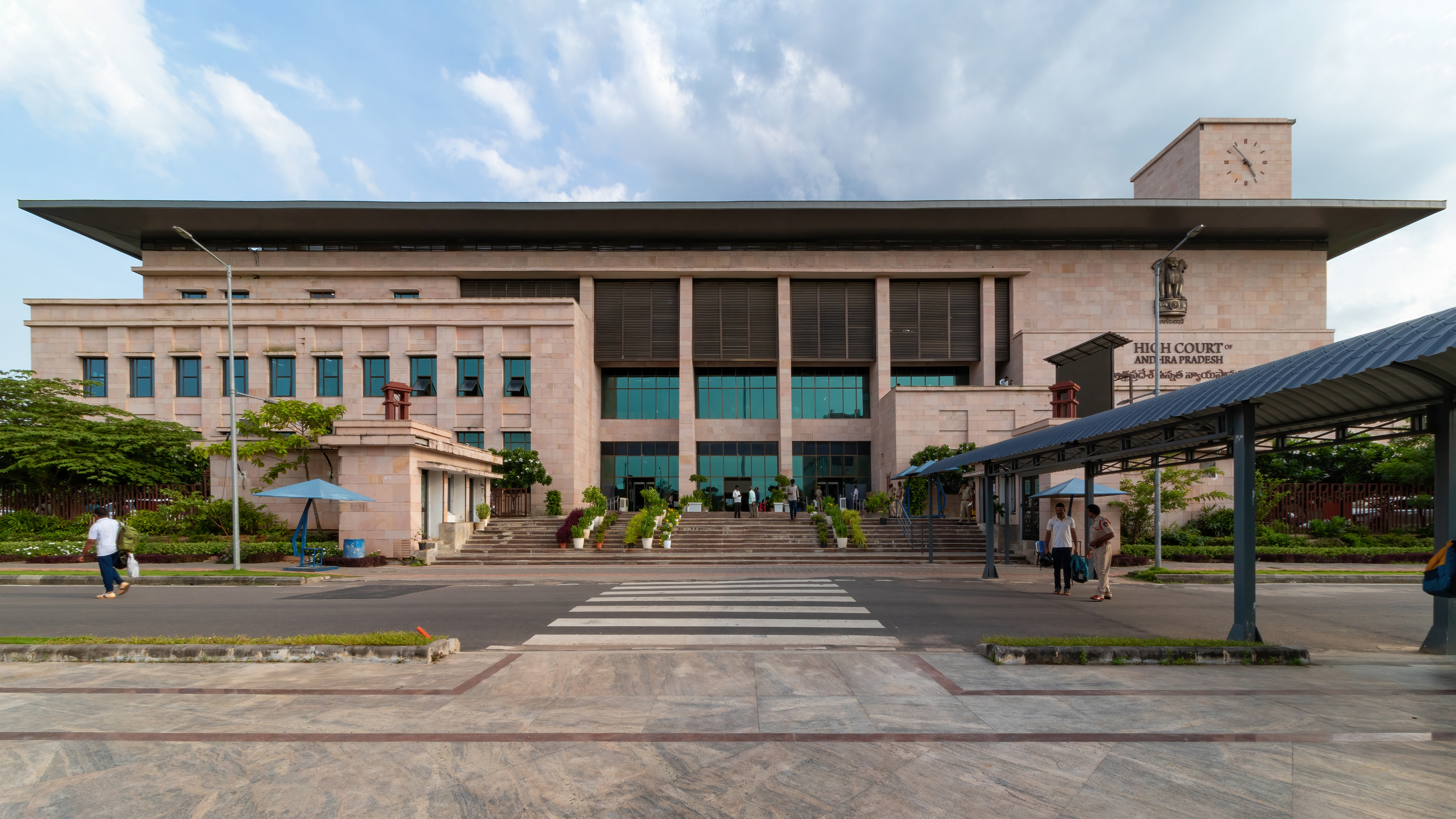
High Court of Andhra Pradesh at Amaravati

Andhra Pradesh High Court at Amaravati is the highest judicial authority of the state with control over all the civil and criminal courts in the state. It is headed by a chief justice and has a sanctioned strength of 37 judges. The district judiciary is organised in a three-tier system with district courts at the top, civil (senior) and assistant sessions courts in the middle and civil (junior) and judicial first-class magistrate courts at the lower level. Apart from these, there are family courts, special courts, land reforms appellate and industrial tribunals.

Andhra Pradesh Police operates under the home ministry of the state govrenment and is responsible for maintaining law and order in the state. As of 2023, the state had 1021 police stations. As per the National Crime Records Bureau, 153,867 cases were filed in the state in 2023 translating to a crime rate of 2,891 per million. These included 25,503 cases for crimes against women and children and 2,341 cyber crime cases.

=== Politics ===
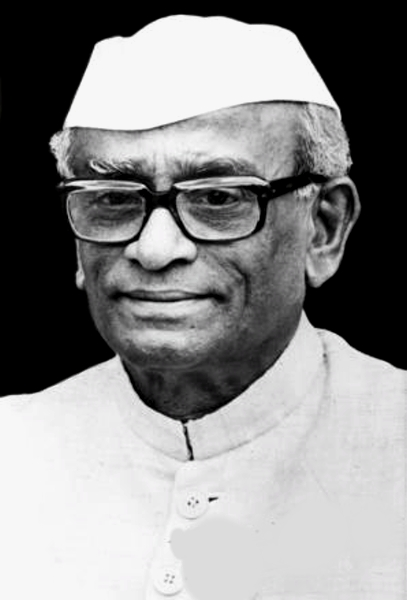
Neelam Sanjiva Reddy, who was the chief minister of the state in the 1950s, later became the President of India in 1977

Since the formation of the state, Indian National Congress (INC) held a monopoly on governance from 1956 to 1983. Thereafter, the Telugu Desam Party (TDP), led by N. T. Rama Rao, came to power after the 1983 Andhra Pradesh Legislative Assembly election. The INC and TDP alternated to rule the state for the next thirty years. After Telangana was bifurcated in 2013, the TDP formed the first government of the residual state in 2014, with Chandrababu Naidu as the chief minister. In the 2019 elections, the YSR Congress Party, led by Y. S. Jagan Mohan Reddy, came to power, winning 151 out of 175 seats. In the 2024 assembly elections, the TDP-led National Democratic Alliance with Janasena Party and Bharatiya Janata Party emerged victorious, winning 164 seats, and Naidu became the chief minister of the state for the fourth time.

Sarvepalli Radhakrishnan, who served as the first Vice President of India from 1952 to 1962 and President of India from 1962 to 1967, hailed from Sarvepalli in Nellore district. V. V. Giri, who was the president from 1969 to 1974 hailed from a Telugu family from East Godavari district. Neelam Sanjeeva Reddy, who served as the chief minister for two terms in the 1950s and 1960s, later served as the president from 1977 to 1982. P. V. Narasimha Rao, who was the chief minister of the state from 1971 to 1973, later served as the Prime Minister of India from 1991 to 1996.

== Economy ==
The state had an estimated Gross state domestic product (GSDP) of ₹17.62 trillion (US$190 billion) for 2025-26 (at current prices), a ten percent increase from 15.91 t (15.66 long tons; 17.54 short tons) in the previous financial year. In 2024-25, agriculture, manufacturing, and services sectors contributed 37%, 21%, and 42% respectively. The per capita GDP is estimated at ₹298,058 (US$3,200) for 2025-26. According to the Economic Survey of India 2024–25, the state was identified as the "leading performer" in the agriculture and allied sectors, with an annual growth rate of 8.8%.

As per a NITI Aayog report, the poverty rate was recorded as 4.2% in 2023, down from 11.77% in 2015–16. As per the labour force survey for the period of July 2022 to June 2023, the state had an unemployment rate of 24%, the third highest in the country, with the national rate at 13.4%.

=== Agriculture ===
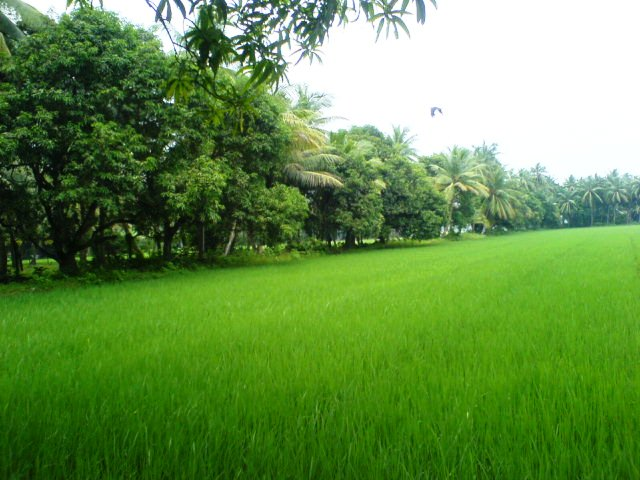
Rice is the staple crop in the state; Pictured paddy fields in Konaseema district

The agricultural economy of the state consists of agriculture and agro industries, livestock and poultry farming, and fisheries. The state had a total cultivable area is 19.904 million acres in 2024. In 2020-21, about 62.2% of the able population was engaged in agriculture and related activities. Rice is the major food crop and staple food, while other crops include jowar, bajra, maize, pulses, sugarcane, cotton, tobacco, fruits, and vegetables. The state contributed to 30% of the total fish production of India and it had a share of 35% in total sea food exports of India in 2022–23.

The state has three designated agricultural export zones: Chittoor region for mango pulp and vegetables, Krishna region for mangoes, and Guntur region for chillies. Banaganapalle mangoes produced in the state were accorded a Geographical Indication status in 2017. Government run Rythu Seva Kendras serve as farmer facilitation centres for disbursing agricultural requirements like seeds and manure, for the procurement of harvests, and for financial services. As of 2023, the government operated 10,778 such centres in the state.

In 2014, the Commission on Inclusive and Sustainable Agricultural Development of Andhra Pradesh estimated about 2.43 million farmers in the state of which 0.63 million were landless tenants, who cultivated about 44% of the total cultivated land. As per the provisions of the Crop Cultivator Rights Act (CCRA) of 2019, an effort was made to identify such farmers. However, by 2022, only 26% of the estimated had obtained or loan eligibility cards. While the state government enacted the Land Titling Act in 2023 to modify the presumptive land ownership system based on possession, registration or inheritance documents to conclusive land ownership system, it was repealed in 2024 due to the scope for misuse of authority and deviation from the central government's draft bill.

=== Industries ===
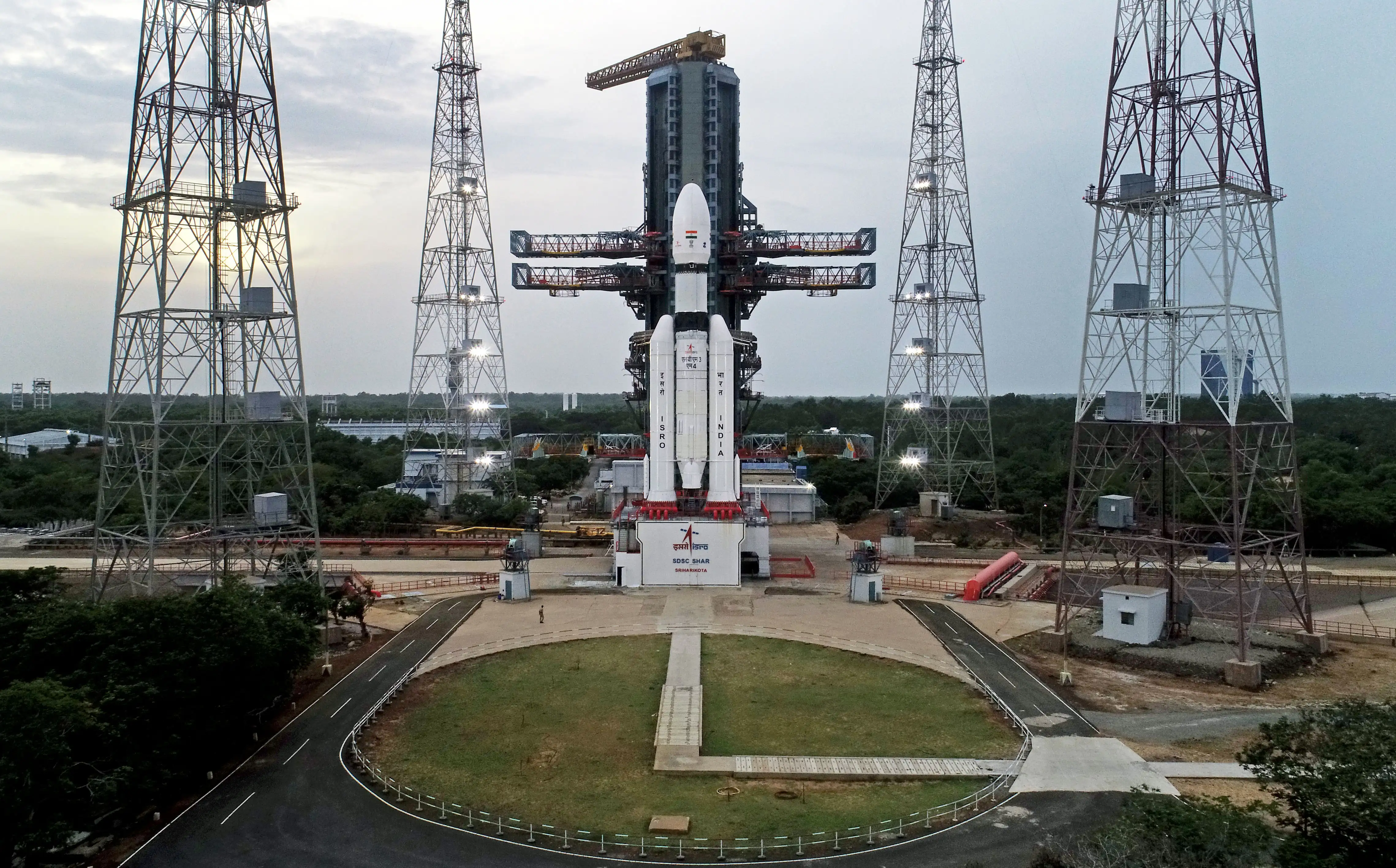
Rocket launch at the Satish Dhawan Space Centre, Sriharikota

As per the annual survey of industries 2019–20, the state had 12,582 factories which employed 681,224 people. Food products (25.48%), minerals (11.26%), textiles (9.35%), and pharmaceuticals (8.68%) were the major contributing sectors in terms of the number of factories. In terms of the total Gross value of ₹550.35 billion (US$5.9 billion), food products (18.95%), pharmaceuticals (17.01%), and non-metallic minerals (16.25%) were the top three contributors. The top contributing districts were Visakhapatnam, Tirupati, and Krishna.

The defence administered Hindustan Shipyard Limited at Visakhapatnam is a major ship building yard and built the first ship in India in 1948. The mining sector contributed ₹33.9 billion (US$360 million) in revenue in 2021–22. About 225 million barrels of crude oil were produced from the Ravva oil field, located in the offshore area of the Krishna–Godavari basin during 1994–2011. The state accounted for 0.6% of codensate production, and 2.9% of natural gas production of India in 2020–21. There are 36 automotive manufacturing facilities in the state.

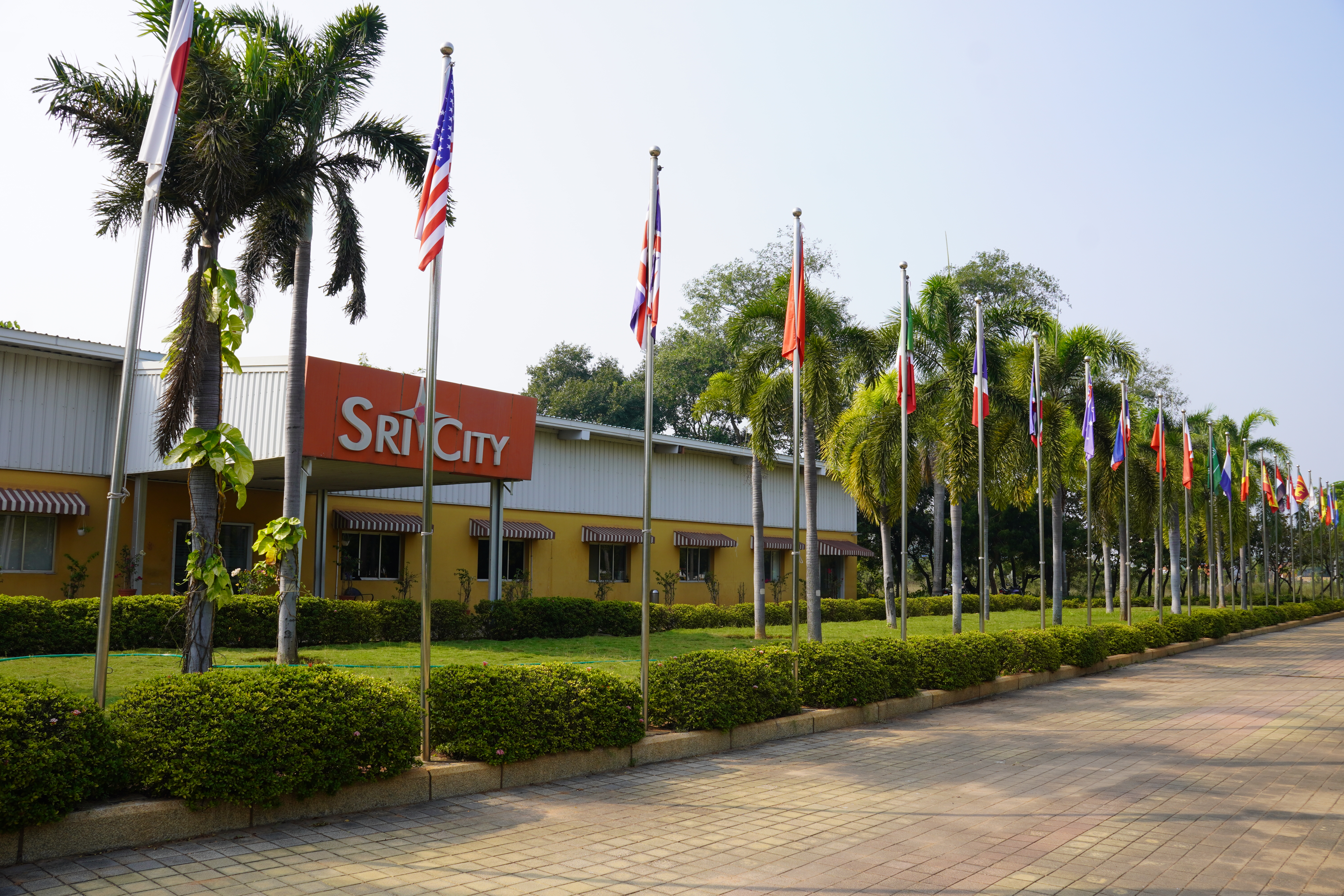
Sri City, a Special Economic Zone

Andhra Pradesh has over 50 notified Special Economic Zones across various sectors including information technology, pharmaceuticals, biotechnology, and textiles. Major such zones include Visakhapatnam Special Economic Zone, Sri City, and Andhra Pradesh Special Economic Zone. As of 20 June 2023 there were 190 science and technology organisations in the state, including 12 central labs and research institutions. The Satish Dhawan Space Centre, operated by the Indian Space Research Organisation, is located on the barrier island of Sriharikota and is India's primary rocket launching station.

=== Services ===
Trade, hotels and restaurants, public administration, and information technology formed the major services category. In 2021-22, the information technology exports from the state was valued at ₹9.26 billion (US$99 million), about 0.14% of the IT exports from India. The state is ranked third in domestic tourist footfalls for the year 2021, with 93.2 million domestic tourists, amounting to 13.8% of all domestic tourists in India. A major share of the tourists visited Visakhapatnam and temples in Tirupati, Vijayawada, and Srisailam.

== Transportation ==
=== Roads ===
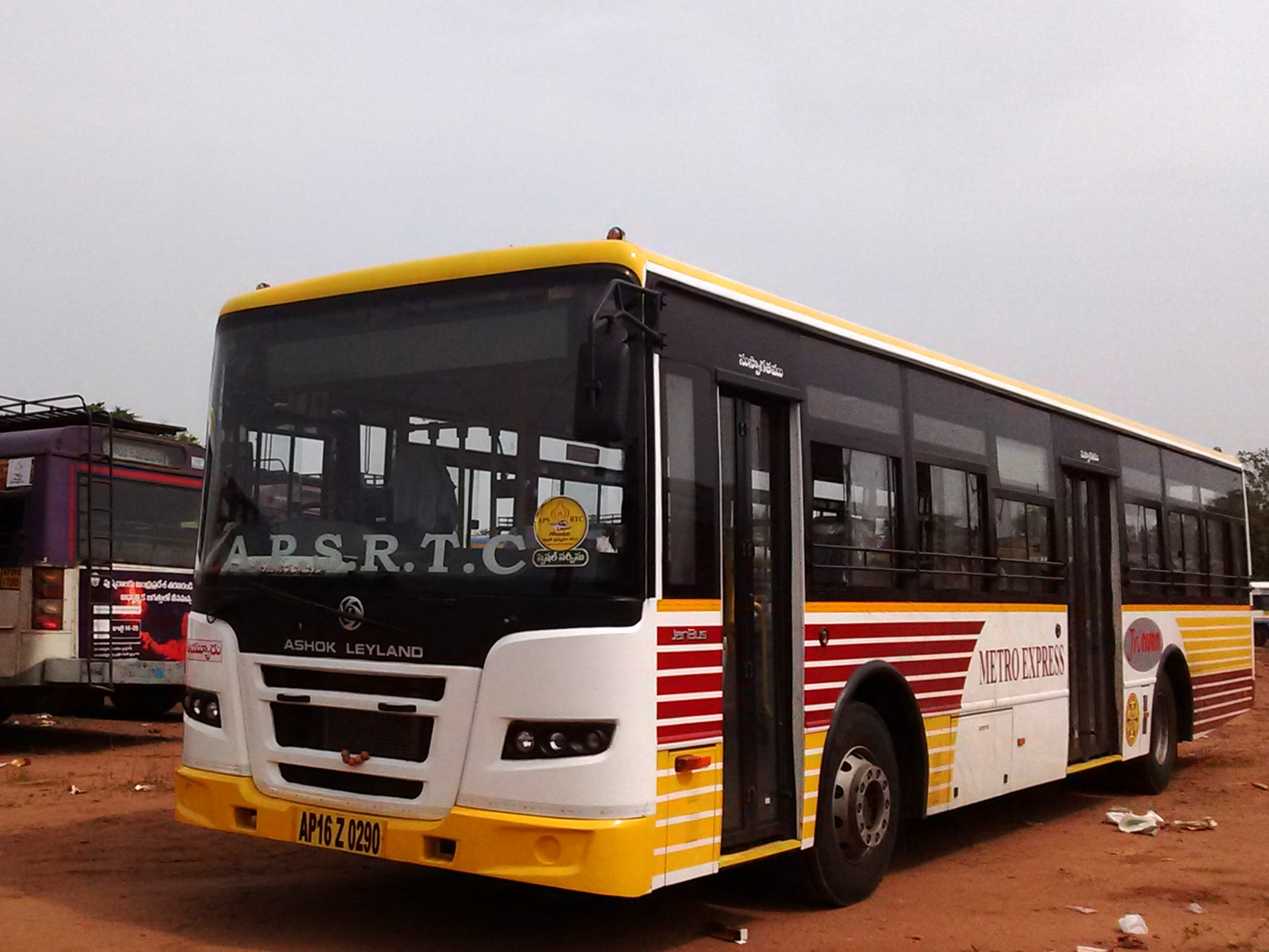
An intracity bus operated by the Andhra Pradesh State Road Transport Corporation

As of 2023 the state had a road network of 53,484.72 km (33,233.86 mi) comprising 8,163.72 km (5,072.70 mi) of national highways, 12,595.60 km (7,826.54 mi) of state highways, 26,485.51 km (16,457.33 mi) of major district roads, and 6,239.89 km (3,877.29 mi) of other roads. These include 3,898.19 km (2,422.22 mi) of four or six-lane roads and expressways. There are 52 national highways including the National Highway 16, with forms part of the Golden Quadrilateral network.

The state government-owned Andhra Pradesh State Road Transport Corporation provides public bus services, It operates a fleet of 11,098 buses across 129 depots, ferrying 3.68 million passengers daily. As of 2023, the state had 1.83 million transport vehicles, of which goods carriers constituted 53.6%, and auto rickshaws 36.2%. There were 13.7 million non-transport vehicles, of which motorcycles constituted 89.5%, and four-wheelers constituted 7.3%.

=== Rail ===
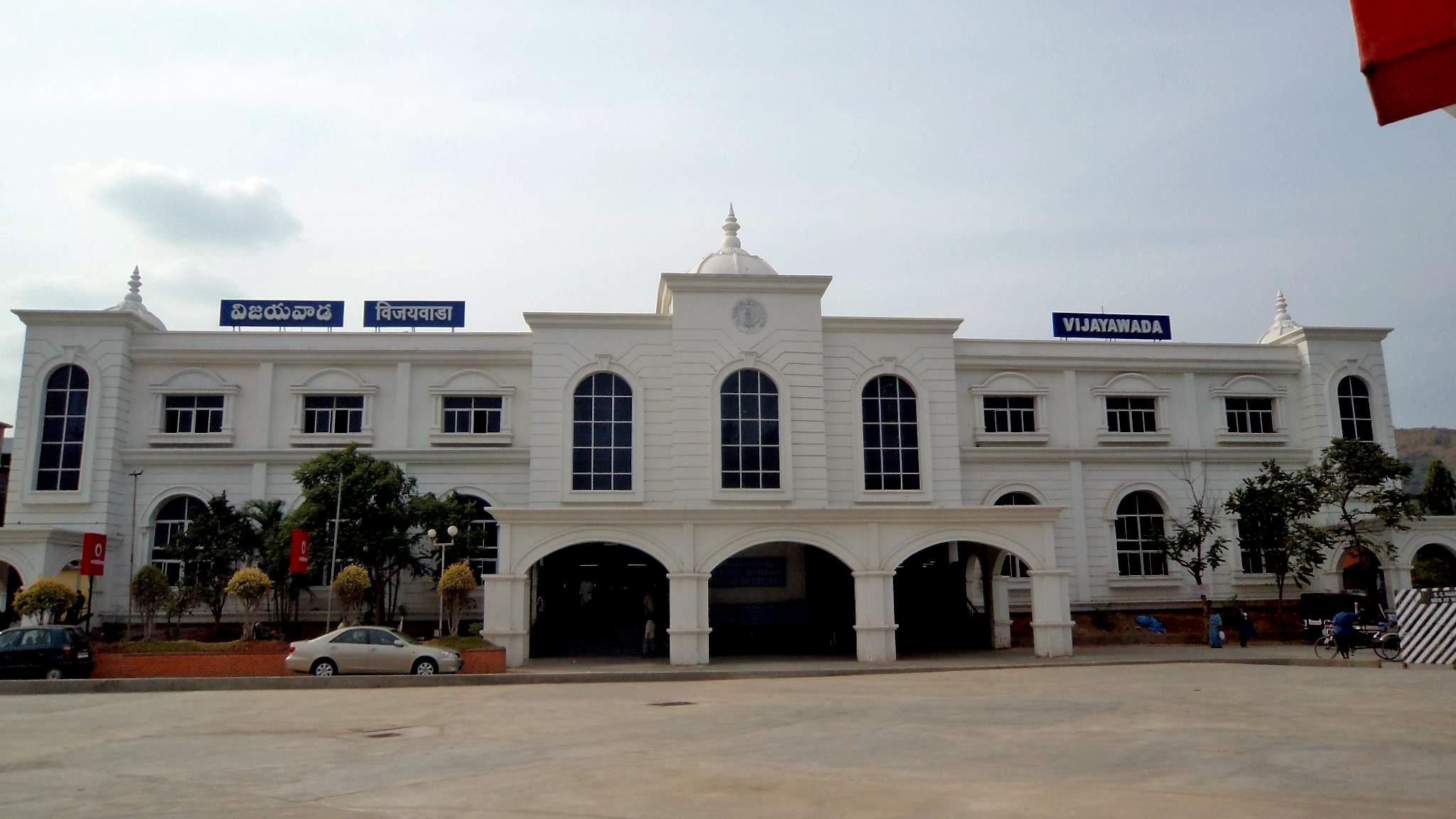
Vijayawada Junction railway station

In 1843, Arthur Cotton constructed a short railway line along the beach in Visakhapatnam. In 1845, a railway line was established for ferrying and construction materials for building a dam near Rajamahendravaram. The Madras Railway established a rail connection from Madras to Renigunta in September 1862. The Rajahmundry–Visakhapatnam line was established in 1893 and the link between Madras and Vijayawada was established in 1899, thereby completing the Howrah-Chennai main line.

As of 2022, the state has a total broad-gauge railway length of 3,969 km (2,466 mi). The railway network forms part of the South Central railway, East Coast railway, South Western railway, and Southern Railway zones. South Coast Railway zone, with headquarters in Visakhapatnam, was announced in 2019, and came to effect on 1 June 2026. There are 180+ railway stations in the state, including 26 major stations. Visakhapatnam was declared the cleanest railway station in the country, as per an assessment in 2018. Shimiliguda is one of the highest altitude broad-gauge stations in the country.

=== Air ===
Airports in Andhra Pradesh

Tirupati Airport was established in 1976. Flight services started at Visakhapatnam Airport in the same year, before it was transferred to the Indian Navy in 1986, and was later established as a civil enclave alongside the airbase INS Dega. Vijayawada Airport began commercial operations in 2003. Apart from these three airports, which are authorised to cater to international flights, the state has domestic airports at Rajamahendravaram, Kadapa, and Kurnool. A privately owned airport is located Puttaparthi. The Alluri Sitarama Raju International Airport was opened for commercial operations on 17 August 2026. In 2021-22, the state catered to a domestic air passenger traffic of 2.47 million.

=== Water ===
The state has one major port at Visakhapatnam under the administrative control of the central government and 15 notified ports, including three captive ports, under the control of the state government. Visakhapatnam port was commissioned in 1933. Krishnapatnam, Gangavaram, and Kakinada are the other major seaports. About 189.21 million tonnes of cargo was handled by the five largest ports in 2023-24. As of 2023, new sea ports were under construction at Machilipatnam, Mulapeta, and Ramayapatnam.

== Infrastructure ==
=== Water supply ===
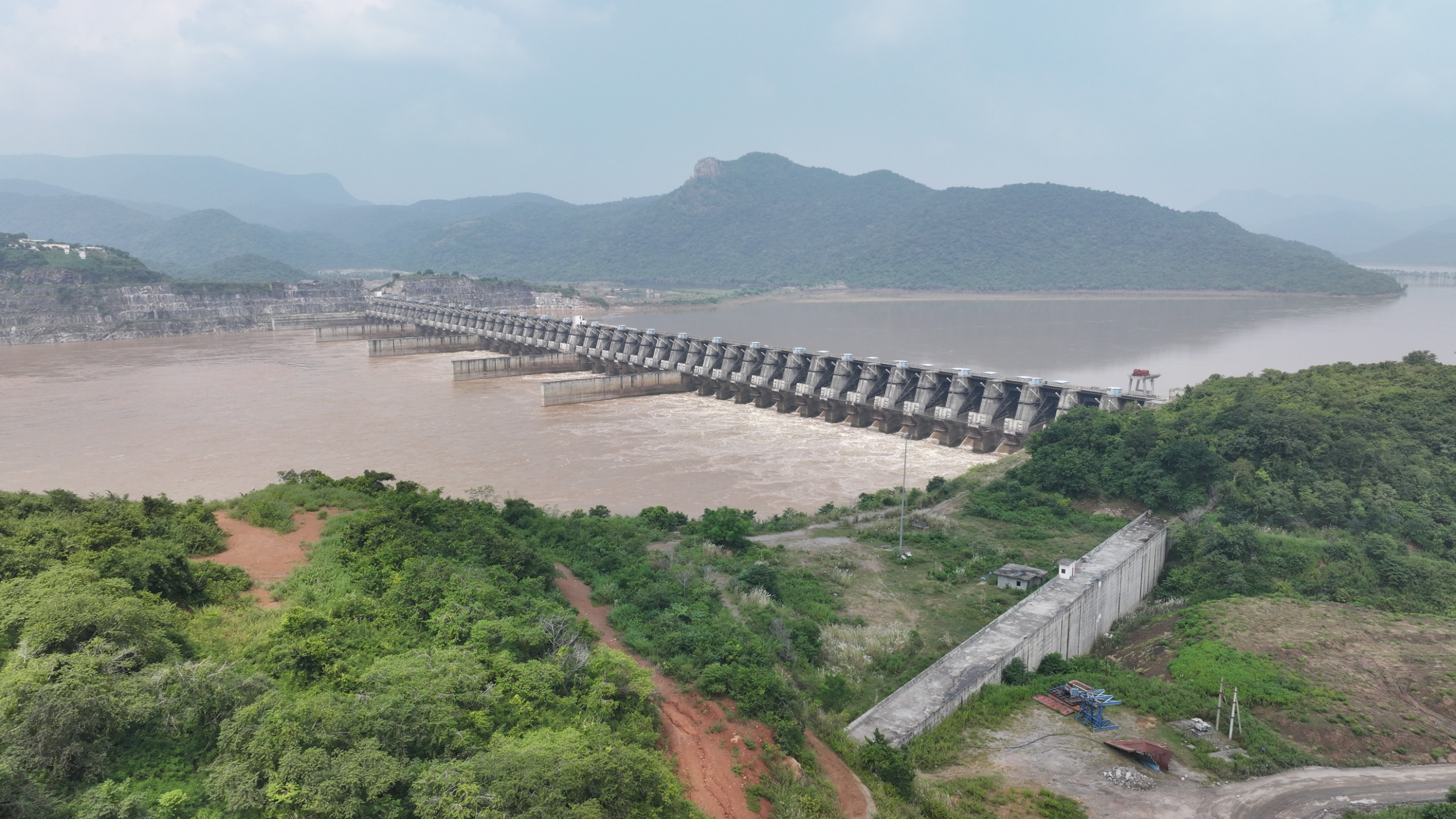
Polavaram Project

The state has 40 major and medium rivers including the Godavari, Krishna, and Penna rivers and 40,000 minor streams and irrigation canals, which irrigate 10.172 million acres of land. Following the split of Telangana in 2014, there have been disputes regarding the sharing of Krishna and Godavari River waters between the states.

The Dowleswaram Barrage is an irrigation structure built on the Godavari River in the mid 19th century. The Nagarjuna Sagar Dam was commissioned in 1967 and the Srisailam Dam was commissioned in 1982. Veligonda Project, serving the needs of united Prakasam, Nellore, and Kadapa districts, was inaugurated in August 2026.

Polavaram Project is an under construction multi purpose project located 42 km (26 mi) upstream of Dowleshwaram, with a planned reservoir capacity of 194.6 Tmcft. Annamayya project is a planned irrigation project in the Annamayya district.

=== Power and energy ===
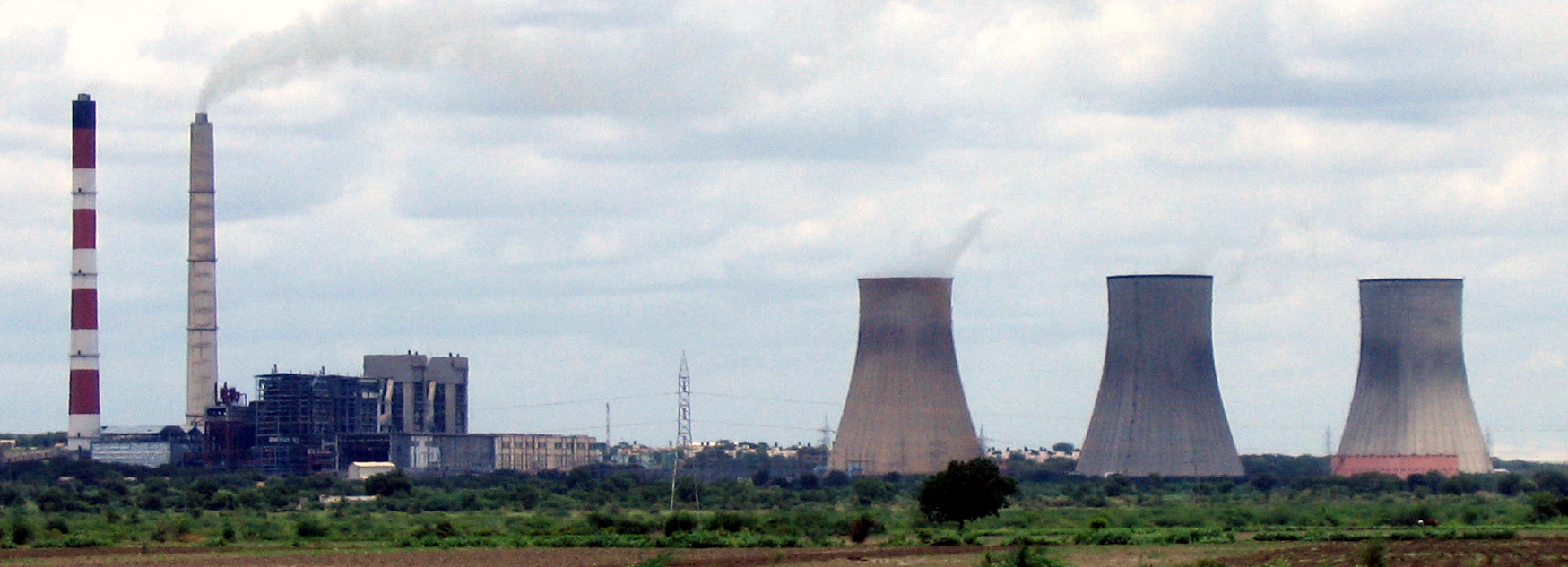
Rayalaseema Thermal Power Station

As of October 2023, the state has an installed power capacity of 28,317 MW with 9,973 MW originating from the public sector and 18,354 MW from the private sector. Thermal power was the largest contributor with 17,325 MW, and Renewable energy contributed to the remaining 10,992 MW. As of 2022, the annual energy consumption was 68,972 million Kwh with a per capita consumption was 1,285 Kwh and a peak power demand of 2,032 MW. The energy consumption increased to 69,113 million Kwh in 2023–42.

=== Communication ===
As of 2023, the state had 10,605 post offices. State owned Bharat Sanchar Nigam Limited (BSNL) operated 1,310 fixed line telephone exchanges with 20.6 million landline connections. BSNL and private operators including Bharti Airtel, Reliance Jio, and Vodafone Idea provided mobile services in the state. Mobile network services are available in 15,322 out of 17,328 villages, including 5G services provided in select localities. There were 82 million mobile phone users including 67.1 million internet subscribers. Broadband and Internet Protocol television services were provided by the state owned Andhra Pradesh State FiberNet Limited and other private oparators. BSNL operates a Wide Area Network connecting 2,164 government offices across 668 locations, including dedicated links between the district headquarters and the state capital.

=== Healthcare ===
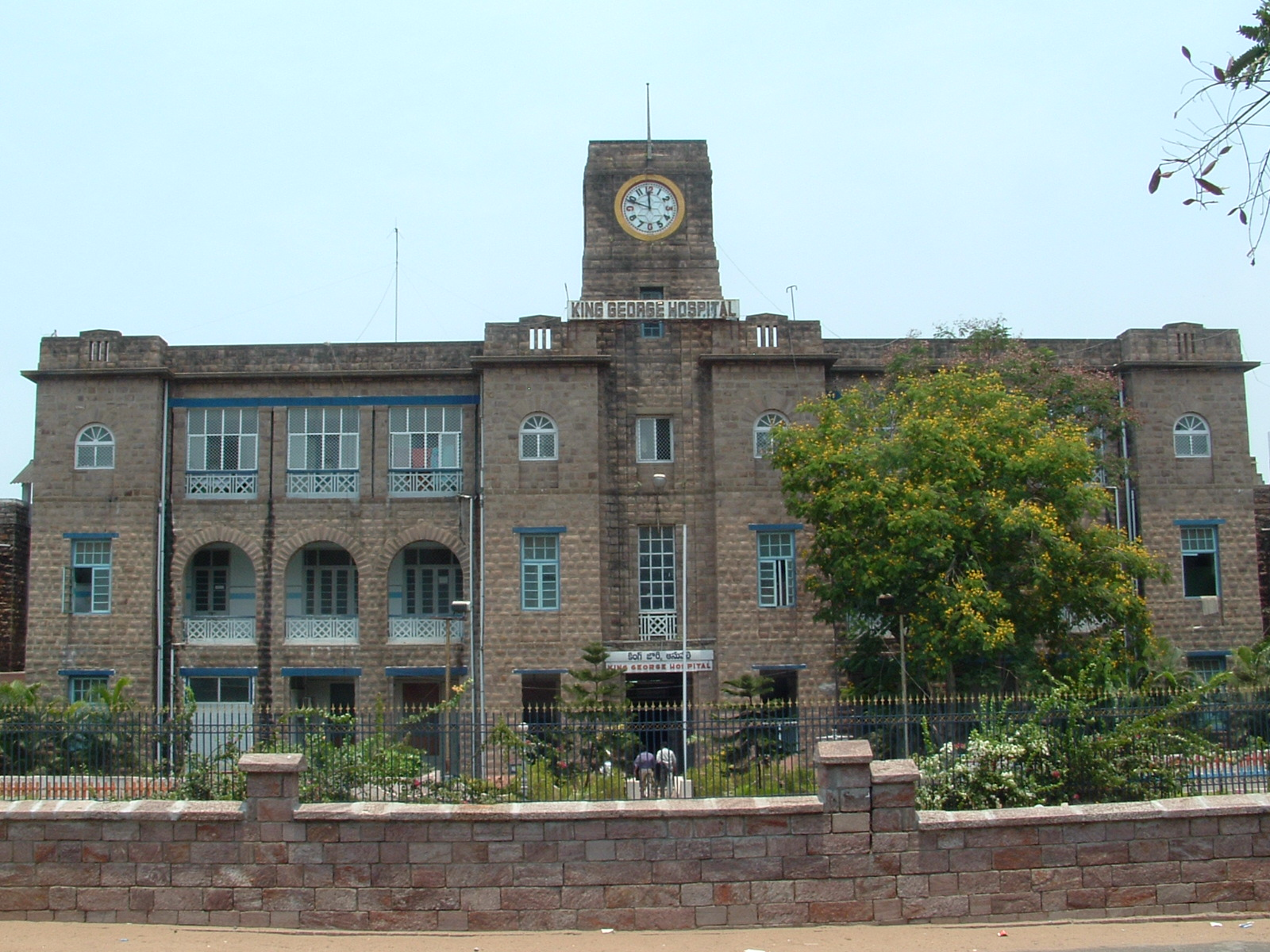
King George Hospital, Visakhapatnam

As of 2019, there were 13 district hospitals, 28 sub-district hospitals, and 6,049 urban and rural health centres in the state. The government employed 42,060 Accredited Social Health Activists (ASHA) to provide doorstep healthcare support services. The 108 service provides emergency services and the 104 service provides health care services at the doorstep of villages through mobile medical units.

The central and state governments provides free health insurance up to a limit of ₹2.5 million (US$27,000) to the poor families. Patients under the state insurance scheme are treated in government hospitals, and 2,700 private hospitals including 540 tertiary care hospitals. About 1.39 million patients were treated at a cost of ₹33.5 billion (US$360 million) in 2023–24. A 2022 study indicated that the mortality rate has decreased amongst the beneficiaries with a lower average claim amount adjusted for inflation, indicating better outcomes at a lower cost. The National family health survey conducted between 2019 to 2021 indicated that at least 70% of the households had at least one member covered under the government insurance schemes.

=== Banking ===
As of March 2023, there were 7,881 branches operated by 33 private sector banks, 12 public sector banks, three rural banks, three small finance banks, three payment banks, one cooperative bank, and one state financial corporation operating in the state. As of September 2022 the banks held fixed deposits amounting to ₹4.35 trillion (US$46 billion) and had extended credit amounting to ₹6.28 trillion (US$67 billion), with a credit to deposit ratio of 1.44, which is higher than the norm of 0.6 set by the Reserve Bank of India. Loans to the primary sector including agriculture amounted to 60.1% of the total credit. In the early 2010s, Andhra Pradesh contributed to nearly two-thirds of the national share of microfinance loans. However, due to newly enacted regulatory norms, there has been a drop in such loans.

== Education ==
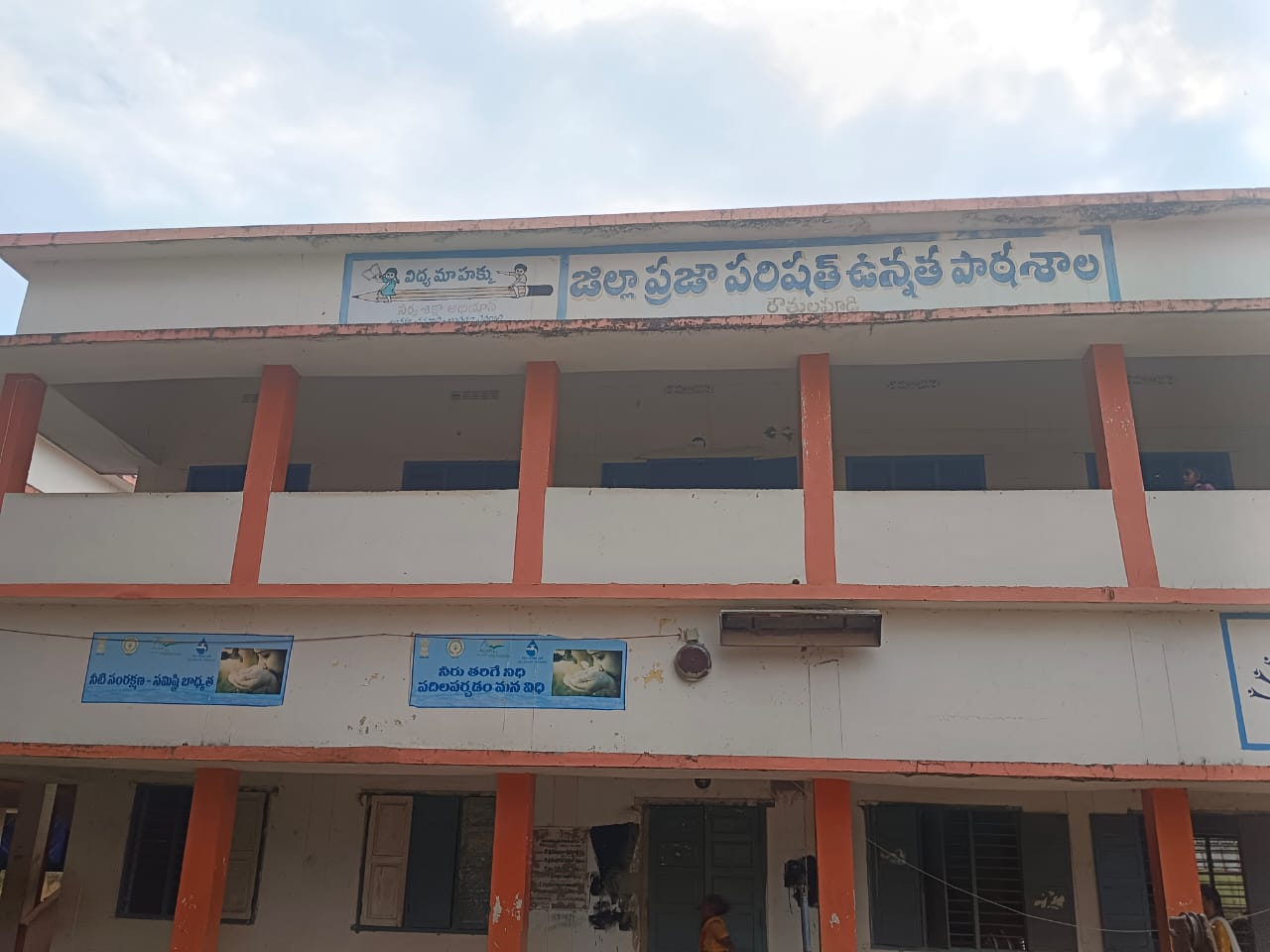
A zilla parishad high school

Primary and secondary school education is imparted by government and private schools, regulated by the school education department of the state government. The state follows the 10+2 system of schooling, and in 2020, the state government classified the schools into six categories–satellite foundation schools (pre-primary), foundational schools (pre-primary – class II), foundational school plus (pre-primary – class V), pre-high school (class III – VII/VIII), high school (class III – X), and high school plus (class III – XII). In 2021, government schools which earlier used Telugu as the medium of instruction, were transitioned to English-medium, and 1,000 of them were affiliated to the Central Board of Secondary Education as a part of an educational revamp programme, partly funded by the World Bank. Private schools aided by the government were converted to either government or private schools during the transition. There were 8.25 million students enrolled in 61,948 schools across the state in 2021. In March 2024, 616,615 students appeared for the Class X exams, and 393,757 students appeared for the higher secondary exams.

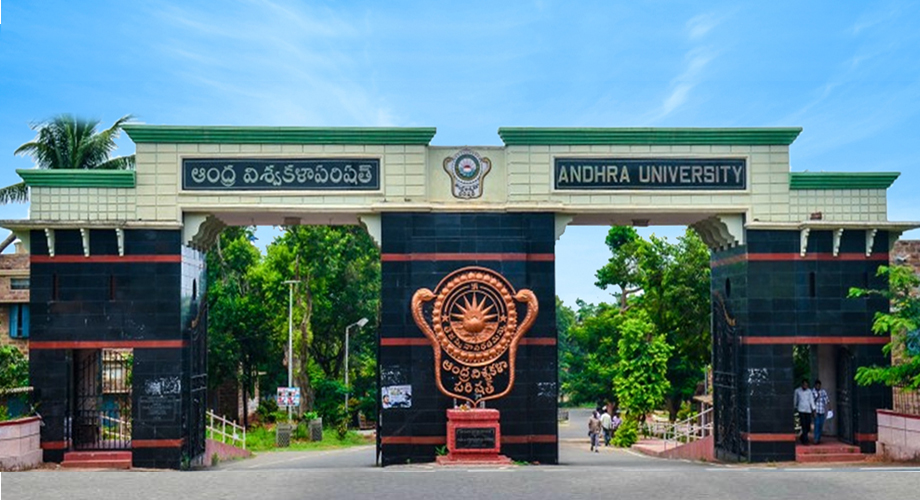
Andhra University, the oldest university in the state

The state council of higher education organises various entrance tests for different streams and conducts counselling for college admissions. The Andhra Pradesh State Skill Development Corporation is responsible for technical skill development and placement for the educated. The gross enrolment ratio (GER) in higher education for the age group 18–23 was at 35.2% in 2019–20, higher than the national GER of 27.1%. There are 36 universities including three central universities, 23 public universities, six private universities, and four deemed universities. Andhra University, established in 1926, is the oldest university in the state. Dr. NTR University of Health Sciences is responsible for overseeing medical education in the 348 affiliated colleges in the state. As of 2023, there were 685 institutions offering diploma, undergraduate, and postgraduate courses, with an annual intake of 299,608 students. These included 169 government and 55 government-aided colleges. There were 85 government and 175 private polytechnic colleges with a sanctioned strength of 75,906 students. In 2020, there were 510 industrial training institutes including 82 run by the government, which had 93,280 seats.

As of 2021, the state has 2,510 public libraries, including four regional libraries and 13 district central libraries under government management. There are few privately-run libraries including the Saraswata Niketanam, one of the oldest libraries in the state, which was established in 1918. In the early 2020s, the state government announced plans to develop digital libraries in rural areas.

== Media ==
In 1902, Krishna Patrika was the first Telugu daily published from the region, and the Andhra Patrika was first published in 1908. As of September 2020, there were 5,798 registered newspapers and periodicals in the state, including 1,645 dailies, 817 weeklies, 2,431 monthlies, and 623 fortnightlies. There were 787 Telugu dailies with an average circulation of 9.9 million and 103 English dailies with an average circulation of 1.6 million. Eenadu, Sakshi, and Andhra Jyothi were the top three Telugu dailies in terms of circulation and the top three Telugu news sites by number of visits.

There are more than 50 private satellite television channels, with the most viewed channels being Star Maa, Zee Telugu, ETV Telugu, and Sun Gemini. BBC launched a Telugu news channel on 2 October 2017. As of 2019, All India Radio operated several radio stations, which were broadcast from 14 locations in the state. As of 2022, four private operators–Red FM, Radio Mirchi, E FM, and Radio City, ran 13 FM radio stations across five cities. Privately held media organisations often exhibit editorial leanings aligned with specific political parties operating within the state.

== Sports ==
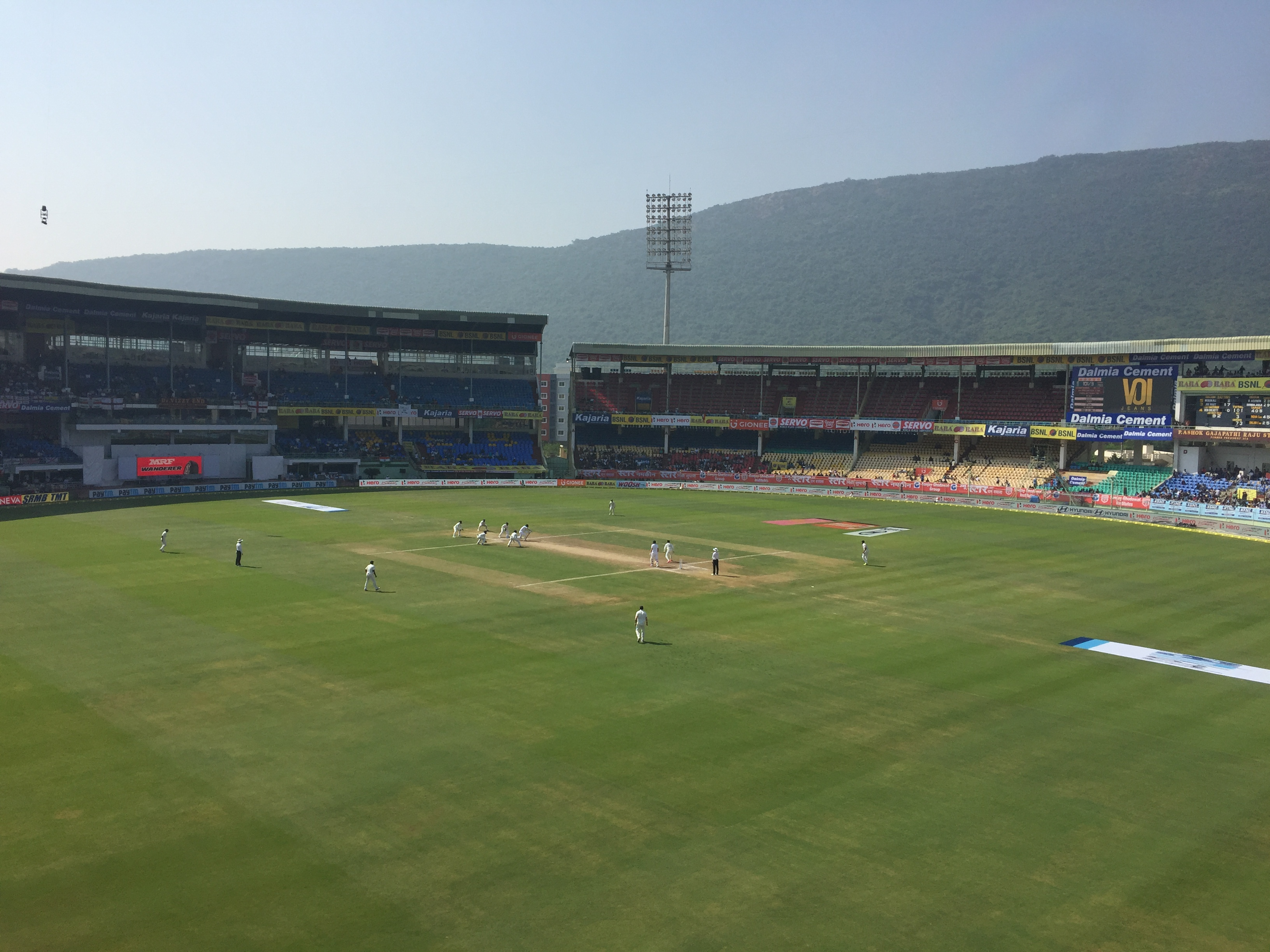
ACA–VDCA Cricket Stadium in Visakhapatnam

Kabaddi is a contact sport which is the state game of Andhra Pradesh. Traditional games include Dagudu Mootalu, Tokkudu Billa, Yedu Penkulata, Vamanaguntalu, Chadarangam, Puli Joodam, Ashta Chamma, Vaikuntapali, Nalugu Stambalata, and Nalugu Ralla Aata. Karra Samu is a traditional martial art form practised in the state. Cricket is a popular sport. The state has two international cricket stadiums–ACA–VDCA Cricket Stadium in Visakhapatnam, and ACA International Cricket Stadium in Vijayawada.

Sports Authority of Andhra Pradesh is the governmental body that is responsible for sports infrastructure development, coaching, and administration of sporting programmes. Sports Authority of India operates three training centres in the state. Athletes from the state won eleven medals in the 2022 Asian games. The state won 16 medals at the 36th National Games held in 2022 and was ranked 21st in the overall medal table. The state team was ranked at 13th spot in the sixth edition of the Khelo India Youth Games in 2023 with 27 medals.

Notable sportspeople from the state include Karnam Malleswari, the first Indian woman to win an Olympic medal at the 2000 Summer Olympics. Pullela Gopichand, the second Indian to win the All England Open Badminton Championships in 2001, P. V. Sindhu, the first Indian to win the BWF World Championships in 2019 and winner of two individual medals in the Summer Olympics, and Srikanth Kidambi, the first Indian male to win a silver medal in the BWF World Championships.

== See also ==
- Outline of Andhra Pradesh
- Disputes between Andhra Pradesh and Telangana
