= 2012 Telangana protests =

Chain of protests which were part of the Telangana movement

Coordinates: 17.99°N 79.59°E

The 2012 Telangana protests were a chain of protests which were part of the Telangana movement. The Bharatiya Janata Party, led by state-party president Kishan Reddy, began the 22-day Telangana "Poru Yatra" – a 3,500-kilometre (2,200 mi) journey through 986 villages and 88 assembly constituencies stressing the need for a stance on Telangana stance – on 19 January. Although the tour was successful in reiterating the party's pro-Telangana stance, it did not gain the hoped-for support because of the indifferent attitude of the Telangana Rashtra Samithi and Telangana Joint Action Committee. The TRS' failure to support Reddy's yatra has resulted in increasing differences between the parties. Two assembly by-elections were held that year, the first in March, and the second in June; the BJP won the first, and the YSR Congress Party the second. Protests resumed in August, when K. Chandrashekar Rao gave the centre a two-week deadline to declare statehood.

== Assembly by-elections ==
=== March ===
By-elections were held on 18 March in six Telangana assembly districts. Five seats were vacant due to MLA retirements in the YSR Congress and Telugu Desam parties, citing the unwillingness of their parties' leadership to take a stand on Telangana; the Mahbubnagar seat was vacant after the death of an independent MLA. Telangana Rashtra Samithi won four of five seats it contested, with majorities ranging from 15,024 to 44,465 votes. In two of the four seats won by TRS (Kamareddy and Adilabad), the TRS candidates received fewer votes than they did in the 2009 assembly elections (when they stood as candidates from TDP, which was allied with TRS). Former TDP MLA Nagam Janardhan Reddy won the Nagarkurnool seat as an independent with TJAC support. Congress lost its deposit in one constituency, and TDP lost its deposits in three.

In Mahbubnagar (part of the parliamentary constituency represented by Rao, known as KCR), TRS lost to TJAC partner BJP by 1,897 votes. Congress was in third place, with 12,000 fewer votes than the BJP; TDP, in fourth place, lost its deposit. In the run-up to the election, TRS did not yield to a BJP request and fielded a Muslim candidate. While campaigning, KCR expressed confidence that his party's candidate would win and the election would be a formality. The BJP candidate received a show-cause notice for inflaming up community passions in his campaign speech.

In response to the BJP's victory, All India Majlis-e-Ittehadul Muslimeen (MIM) legislative assembly leader Akbaruddin Owaisi said that the result vindicated his party's stand on Telangana. Owaisi reiterated that MIM would aggressively raise its voice for a united Andhra Pradesh to protect minorities. After clashes in Sangareddy and Hyderabad, Muslim Forum for Telangana head Lateef Mohammad Khan said that Muslims would prefer the state's remaining united to a separate Telangana controlled by factions.

After the new MLAs were sworn in, there were reports of attempted or completed suicides protesting the delay in forming a separate state. Police later found possible links between the suicides and personal problems. The suicides prompted violent protests by T activists. A bandh was called across the region by TRS to mourn the suicides. The bandh had minimal effect on Hyderabad city including areas near Osmania University. TRS and BJP members carried party flags in one procession, which was criticised by other parties as encouraging suicide.

None of the major parties supporting a Telangana state produced accurate data to substantiate their claims of the number of suicides. Claims varied from 315 (the official figure) to 850 people. A senior minister from the Telangana region said that even if facts were known, they probably would not be publicised due to the delicacy of the issue.

On 4 April, the Supreme Court reprimanded the state government for not responding to its notice about the state's failure to rein in Telangana agitators who indulged in "sheer goondaism and vandalism" in the Andhra Pradesh High Court in September 2010: This was in response to a plea filed by an advocate who alleged that during the agitation, irate lawyers entered the courtroom, threatened the judge and committed vandalism:

By not filing affidavits, are you supporting the vandalism in the High Court? This is sheer goondaism in the court rooms, throwing chairs, breaking glass and switching off lights. It could have harmed the judges. They even could have killed the judge and the State was watching.

=== June 2012 ===
By-elections were held for 18 assembly seats and one parliamentary seat on 12 June. Seventeen MLAs (including the MLA from Parkal) and one MP were disqualified after they supported the YSR Congress Party (YSRCP). Another seat became vacant when Chiranjeevi joined the Rajya Sabha.

During the run-up to the Parkal election, TRS said that the YSR Congress and TDP were anti-Telangana and would be routed at the polls. The BJP campaigned aggressively in the district, deploying several of its national leaders and CMs of other states to boost support for a Telangana state. YSRCP said that their candidate had resigned for the Telangana cause, they respected Telanganan sentiment and did not oppose the state. TDP leaders said that their party would present a letter to the central government supporting Telangana after the elections. Some Congress leaders campaigned in the Seema-Andhra region that if the YSR Congress party won the elections, Telangana state will be formed.

The YSRCP won 15 assembly seats and the parliamentary seat in the Seema-Andhra region. TRS's candidate won the Parkal seat by 1,562 votes over YSRCP candidate Konda Surekha. TDP finished third, receiving 30,000 votes and retaining its deposit, and the BJP and Congress lost their deposits. TRS leaders unhappy with the slim majority blamed it on the split of pro-Telangana votes and the electoral symbol – auto and hat – of some independents, which they said resembled theirs (a car). They alleged that their rivals spent large amounts of money and distributed liquor and cotton seeds. The BJP also attributed their defeat to YSRCP and TRS' wooing of voters with gold coins, liquor and cotton seeds. According to Congress observer Vayalar Ravi, TRS' poor result raised questions about Telangana sentiment.

Reacting to the results, Telangana Congress MPs said that their party would not campaign in Telangana due to its anti-Telangana stance. TRS leader Vinod Kumar said that all the votes cast in Parkal favoured Telangana, and reiterated that the Congress must realise that it was losing its base in the state. TDP Telangana Forum convenor Errabelli Dayakar Rao said that the Parkal result was a "slap" to TRS, and the people of Telangana had realised that the party was cheating them.

== Protests ==
On 14 August, KCR gave the central government a two-week deadline to declare statehood promised to launch another round of agitation if the government did not meet the deadline. He later said that he had received feelers that a positive announcement would be made by Eid al-Fitr. In an interview after Eid, KCR said that Sonia Gandhi had always favoured Telangana and the central government would call his party for discussions in "few weeks or so". On 6 September, KCR left for Delhi and announced that the issue would be resolved by the end of the month. After 23 days in the capital, KCR returned to Hyderabad hoping that a final round of talks with the Congress leadership would be held soon on the issue. He said that his discussions with several leaders were productive.

According to his son (and Sircilla legislator) K. T. Rama Rao, Telangana would become a reality before the 2014 Indian general election. Reacting to this, TRS leader (and KCR's nephew) T. Harish Rao announced that his party was ready to merge with Congress at the grant of a separate state – a merger which would only benefit the latter – and threatened Congress leaders with an "action plan" if the parties did not merge.

The Hindu reported on 1 September that the BJP and the Telangana people wanted the issue resolved as soon as possible, since delays and long-lasting protests had cost the region dearly. Later that day, the BJP announced that they would begin campaigning for Telangana on 3 September. BJP state-unit president Kishan Reddy announced that he would lead a three-day hunger strike at Delhi's Jantar Mantar in support of statehood.

That month, incoming home minister Sushilkumar Shinde said that the Telangana demand must be handled carefully since similarly carved smaller states had increased Naxalite problems. Addressing a public meeting in Nizamabad district, AIMIM president Asaduddin Owaisi reaffirmed his party's stance that a separate Telangana state was impossible and Muslims would not accept a separate state.

Telangana activists desecrated the statue of former chief minister Kasu Brahmananda Reddy outside the Kasu Brahmananda Reddy National Park. A home guard and constable were injured by the protesters, and Telangana United Front (TUF) pamphlets were found at the site. TUF leader Vimalakka was arrested under sections 147, 148, 149, 332, 335 and 425 of the Indian Penal Code (IPC) and sections of the Prevention of Damage to Public Property (PDPP) Act after she admitted her involvement in the protest, and she was later released on bail.

== Telangana March ==
=== Preparations ===
After setting 30 September as the deadline for the central government to announce the formation of Telangana, the TJAC threatened to organise a Telangana March in Hyderabad similar to Mahatma Gandhi's Salt March. Anticipating violence and property damage, police initially denied permission for the march (which was scheduled near Ganesh Nimmajjan on 29 September and the UN biodiversity conference, which began on 1 October). Police began checking buses and trains entering the city, and students trying to enter the city to participate in the protest were sent back. They identified activists, arresting pro-Telangana activists throughout the region. According to police, intelligence reported that protestors might attack property throughout Andhra Pradesh. Congress MP Madhu Yaskhi Goud said that people supporting a united Andhra should not live in the Telangana region, and wanted protestors to attack the property of Andhra Pradesh MPs during the march. He was later gheraoed by pro-Telangana activists in his Lok Sabha constituency of Nizamabad, who called him the "Telangana Betrayer" and demanded that he resign to demonstrate his commitment to the issue.

All pro-Telangana parties pledged their support of the march. Prominent Telangana residents wrote a letter to the president of India asking permission for the march and expressed concern that preventive detention of activists would lead to more violence by protestors.

On 28 September, after long discussions between TJAC leaders and ministers from the Telangana region, the state government (ignoring warnings about a possible breakdown in law and order) gave permission for the march. The TJAC leaders promised the government in writing that the demonstration would be conducted in a peaceful, "Gandhian" manner from 3 to 7 pm on 30 September on Necklace Road, at the edge of the Hussain Sagar lake. Indian Railways cancelled several express and passenger trains and all local and suburban trains in Hyderabad, reportedly on police advice. Although TJAC leaders alleged mass arrests of Telangana supporters (preventing their travel to Necklace Road), police said that they had made no new arrests and all who had been arrested before the march was permitted were released. They allowed entry to Necklace Road on three designated routes, but pro-Telangana groups demanded access on all routes. Police also said that no permission had been granted for any other rallies in the city.

=== Demonstration ===
On 30 September, the day of the march, police closed the gates and blocked students at the Osmania University gate and other protestors at several places in the city when they were proceeding in groups towards the march. When they were stopped from breaking through barricades and trying to proceed through prohibited areas (such as Raj Bhavan), protestors threw stones at police. The police responded with a lathi charge, water cannons and tear gas. Congress MPs from Telangana were arrested in front of the chief minister's office when they staged a dharna because they had been forbidden to meet with him about the detention of party supporters, who were prevented from demonstrating.

Although police sealed nearly all entrances to Necklace Road (opening only the Buddha Bhavan route), by 4 pm about 200,000 protestors – including party leaders and their supporters – reached the venue from all routes. The police were attacked by both sides and ceded Necklace Road to the protesters, who marched to Jal Vihar. According to police, protesters torched two police vehicles at People's Plaza on Necklace Road. Protestors also set afire two media outdoor broadcasting vans, machinery and the temporary cabin room of a construction company, and tried to set a local train at the Khairatabad railway station ablaze. At the railway's Hussainsagar junction cabin, about 1,000 Telangana supporters overpowered over 100 uniformed men in the area and burnt down the cabin after assaulting railway staff. The signalling system was damaged, with officials estimating the loss at about ₹ 6 million. All Telugu news channels covering the march were blocked by police, apparently to prevent the spread of violence to other parts of the city.

Addressing the crowd, M. Kodandaram said that peaceful and disciplined soldiers were fighting for Telangana statehood. He said that they did not want to indulge in violence, despite hurdles erected by police to prevent people from attending the march. Kodandaram alleged that some conspirators from other parts of the state had infiltrated the demonstration, trying to incite violence which would be blamed on the protestors. He begged the crowd not to destroy public property or attack members of the media.

Seven pm came and went, and TJAC leaders refused to leave the venue until the government issued a statement on Telangana. Police first used water cannons and later lobbed tear gas shells on the crowd and on to the stage to force the protestors to leave the venue. They called off the march at midnight, citing heavy rain and injuries. Seeing a helicopter circle over the venue several times, some protestors speculated that the government seeded the clouds to produce heavy rain. The TJAC declared a bandh for the next two days, vowing to launch a region-wide hunger strike and announcing that the agitation would take a more-serious turn if the police continued to repress them. Kodandaram demanded the resignation of ministers from the region and pressure on the central government to grant statehood. Police officials said that their obstacles reduced the number of protestors, which would have been much larger otherwise.

=== Aftermath ===
The following day, local police filed 15 charges against Kodandaram and others for extending the end of the march from the permitted 7 pm to midnight and for violence during the march. Railway police also filed charges against unidentified persons for damage to the signalling system at Lakdikapul. Cases have been booked for unlawful assembly, rioting, arson, mischief with fire and criminal conspiracy. Other charges include attempted murder, since several policemen (including an IPS official) were injured. Cases were also booked against student leaders of TSJAC, OUJAC, Telangana Vidyarti Parishad and TVV. The bandh had little response in Hyderabad, and was only partial in Telangana districts. Osmania University students again threw rocks, and police retaliated with tear gas.

According to TJAC convenor Swamy Goud, the rally was ineffectively led and troublemakers should have been controlled more assertively. Goud said that it indicated the need for stronger leadership, and appealed to KCR to lead from the front. Goud later joined the TRS, and KCR chose him as the party's MLC candidate for the region's upcoming elections.

== December meeting ==
On 28 December 2012, a meeting was organized by Home Minister Sushilkumar Shinde to discuss the Telangana issue. The meeting was attended by eight political parties with significant presence in the state legislature. After hearing out all parties, Shinde said that it would be the final meeting on the issue and the government would reach a decision within 30 days. At the meeting, MIM and CPI(M) reiterated their opposition to the division of the state. YSR Congress remained neutral, and asked the central government to make a decision. Congress representatives presented conflicting views, with one supporting the division and one opposing it. TDP representatives presented a letter from its president saying that it had never withdrawn its 2008 letter to Pranab Mukharjee supporting a Telangana state. The Telangana Joint Action Committee demanded more clarity from Telugu Desam Party before admitting it to the committee.

== See also ==
- Samaikyandhra Movement
- Visalandhra movement

Preceded by Late 2011 Telangana protests	Telangana movement 2012	Succeeded by ?
