= Mid 2011 Telangana protests =

Protests in Andhra Pradesh, India

Coordinates: 17.99°N 79.59°E

The Mid 2011 Telangana protests refers to a chain of protests and mass resignations following the Million March incident in the Indian state of Andhra Pradesh. From April till June, the movement saw a lull, with different parties citing various reasons and fresh deadlines to renew the agitation. In July, 81 of 119 Telangana MLAs in the state, 12 out of 15 Telangana ministers in state, 13 out of 17 Telangana MPs in Lok Sabha, 1 Rajyasabha MP(Congress), 20 MLCs resigned protesting delay in the formation of Telangana. On 20 July, 30-year-old Yadi Reddy was found dead 100 yards from Parliament House in Delhi. An eight-page suicide note says the young driver from greater Hyderabad region of Telangana was upset over the government not creating a new state for his homeland. The speaker of the AP assembly on 23 July summarily rejected the resignations of all 101 MLAs citing that they were made in an emotionally surcharged atmosphere.

== Lull in the movement ==
From April till June, the movement saw a lull, with different parties citing various reasons to set fresh deadlines for renewal of the agitation. Telangana political parties and organizations vowed to intensity the movement in May which were reportedly suspended due to students examinations. TRS also threatened to include a 'boycott' of the academic year at all levels in the region. In June, Both TJAC & the Telangana Congress leaders set fresh deadlines to renew their agitation. While the TJAC threatened another Million March and bandhs starting 10 June, the Congress MPs decided to wait till 25 June and resign if separate statehood is not achieved by then. After this deadline they set another deadline till 5 July after which they vowed to launch an indefinite hunger strike.

Fearing law & order problem due to violence similar to the Million March incident, State police refused to give permission to TRS to hold their formation day public meeting in Parade grounds in Hyderabad. In spite of the personal request to Union defence minister by KCR, the defence ministry turned down the request as the party could not get police clearance. Students of the Osmania University also had their summer vacation cancelled to conduct classes during the summer vacation and make up for the loss caused to academic activities due to Telangana agitation on the campus till March this year. A series of violent incidents on the campus had forced the university administration to postpone several exams. Congress party's leadership also reportedly said they will take decision on Telangana after assembly elections concluding on 10 May. The state government sanctioned Rs 75 lakh for repair and re-installation of statues on Tank Bund, demolished during the Million March incident. Along with installation of the 16 destroyed statues, another new statue of social activist from Telangana, Komaram Bheem, was also proposed to be installed.

According to government sources, Maoists are active in 1/3rd of districts in India. Special Intelligence Branch (SIB) of Andhra Pradesh Police, which monitors the Maoists, gathered "credible information" about the outlaws carrying their activities under the banner of the TJAC. "When the agitation for a separate state began in late 2009, some Maoist elements joined ranks with the students of Osmania University and indulged in violence. Now, they seem to have 'graduated' to a higher level and started working under the so-called political JAC, though the latter as such exists only on paper," a top-ranking police official remarked. Even during the Million March in 2011 militant elements were suspected to be behind the destruction of statues on Tank Bund. On 11 January 2011, Madhu Yaskhi, Congress party MP, said "There is police deployment in every nook of Osmania University and Telangana. Not a single Maoist has been arrested despite police having draconian powers and having searched every hostel over and over again. That proves the lie, They are raising the Maoist bogey to defame the movement."

In a unique form of protest, people from all walks of life came together on Hyderabad's roads on 19 June on a call given by Telangana JAC for a cook-and-eat agitation to demand a separate state. While various groups made arrangements on a massive scale for cooking food on roads, families set up small kitchens.

=== Appointment of Deputy CM from Telangana Region ===
After the State Assembly Elections, it was reported that the Congress will wait till 2013 to announce a decision on Telangana issue. Sources also reported that the Central government has decided against creation of Telangana state and will instead announce a Political & Economic package to the region including Deputy CM post for a leader from the region & also granting national status to the Pranahitha Chevella project. Any attempt at agreeing for the separate state demand was felt will make things difficult for Mamata Banerjee in West Bengal as a similar demand for Gorkhaland in that state can intensify into a big agitation. As a solution to the Telangana problem, Congress implemented a clause in the Gentlemen Agreement by appointing Damodar Raja Narasimha a Dailt leader from the Telangana region as the Deputy Chief Minister of Andhra Pradesh.

== Mass resignations ==
On 4 and 5 July 101 out of 118 MLAs from Telangana region resigned from the Andhra Pradesh Assembly in support of Telangana state formation. Those who didn't resign were 7 MLAs from MIM, 9 from Congress and 1 each from CPM & Lok Satta. The speaker of the assembly on 23 July summarily rejected the resignations of all 101 MLAs citing that they were made in an emotionally surcharged atmosphere.

Asaduddin Owaisi, president of MIM also met the Chief Minister to reiterate their stand that his party prefers a united state citing Muslim interest & safety. He also said, if Telangana state is formed, Hyderabad should be part of Telangana. Zaheer Ali Khan, managing editor of Urdu paper, Siasat, says "The MIM disfavours Telangana, but the larger Muslim sentiment in the city is in favour of a separate state,".

As part of the 2-day bandh declared by the JAC in Telangana region, agitators stopped IT professionals from attending work in some instances. The Telangana Advocates Joint Action Committee (TAJAC) threatened that people who do not support separate statehood of Telangana will not be permitted to stay in Hyderabad. The panchayati raj minister, Mr K. Jana Reddy, also warned the Congress central leadership that if it doesn't take any decision on the state bifurcation issue soon, the state will face a law and order problem, including largescale violence in both the regions which will continue for many more years to come. The South Central Railway suffered Rs. 50 crores loss due to rail roko campaign launched by the TRS & JAC. The high court also issued notices to KCR & Prof. Kodandaram in this regard. There were a total of 8 bandhs in 27 working days between 13 June and 14 July. On 11 July 200 Telangana students started an indefinite hunger strike protesting the delay in Telangana state formation. 120 of them ended the strike after 2days and the rest after 4days due to ill health and on the request of Telangana JAC. Though the original plan was to make 10,000 students sit on hunger strike, less than 150 turned up and only 50 managed to remain till evening. Even the initial rush was accounted to "visitors" and not those who were willing to sit on the fast. On 13 and 14 July, resigned Telangana Congress representatives(MPs, MLAs, MLCs) were on hunger strike due to their party's central leadership's silence on Telangana issue even after their resignations.

The speaker of the AP assembly on 23 July summarily rejected the resignations of all 101 MLAs citing that they were made in an emotionally surcharged atmosphere. All Telangana MPs who earlier submitted their resignations and were boycotting the parliament session also decided to attend the parliament monsoon session citing Sonia Gandhi's ill health.

== Suicide near Parliament ==
On 20 July, 30-year-old Yadi Reddy was found dead 100 yards from Parliament House in Delhi. An eight-page suicide note found says that the young driver from Greater Hyderabad region was upset over the government for not creating Telangana. Telangana JAC called for road blockade on 21 July throughout Telangana in memory of him. Telangana representatives, including those from ruling party, requested the in-charge of state owned guest house in Delhi, AP Bhavan, to house the dead body so that they can pay last respects. This request was denied by the officer who wrote a letter to Delhi police that Yadi Reddy's body should not be allowed in AP Bhavan and instead should be directly sent to the cremation ground after post-mortem.

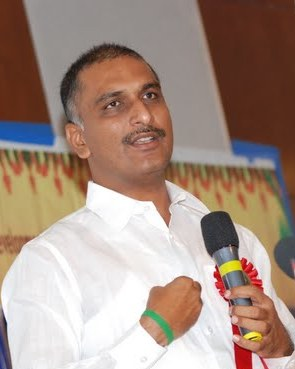
TRS leader Harish Rao was involved in an assault on a government officer during a protest

Protesting against the alleged "lack of respect" shown for "Telangana Martyr", TRS leaders including MLAs and former MPs got violent in the AP Bhavan in Delhi. Harish Rao & KTR also assaulted a Dalit government officer. This led to protests from Dalit leaders who condemned the attack on a Dalit officer by Harish Rao. The officer who was slapped said that Mr Rao later apologised to him. Amid tight security, the body was airlifted from Delhi to Hyderabad and was moved to his native village after arresting scores of Telangana supporters who want to bring the body in procession to Telangana martyr's memorial.

KCR in one of his speeches, remarked that he would rather die consuming poison than face the humiliation if a separate state is not created. This statement was criticised by many leaders suggesting that this will provoke youth to commit suicides.

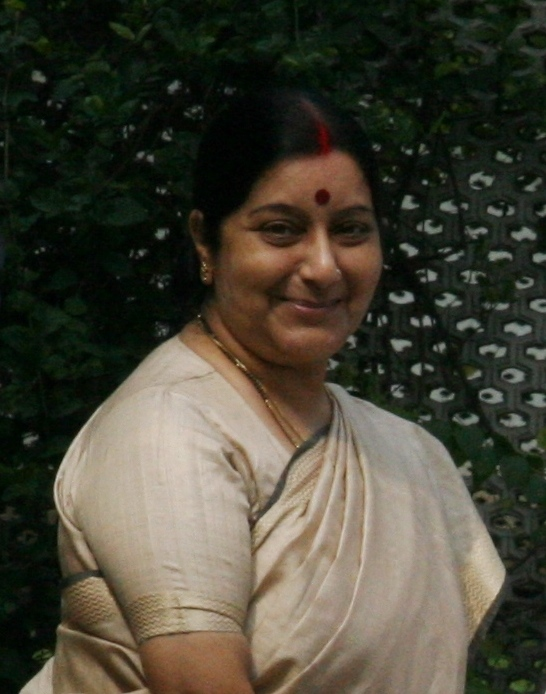
BJP Party leader Sushma Swaraj spoke in the Parliament on the Telangana issue

Leader of opposition in Parliament, Sushma Swaraj, in her address to the house spoke regarding the Telangana movement in last 55 years. She criticised the government for the delay in the formation of Telangana and the Sri Krishna committee report alleging injustice to the people of Telangana while quoting the suicide letter of Yadi Reddy.

== Protests & Violence ==
Protesting the alleged insult to a Telangana Martyr, the TJAC called for Telangana shutdown on 22 July. About 80% buses ran in the Greater Hyderabad region during the bandh. There was also an attack on the farmhouse of a TDP MLA. At least 12 RTC buses worth Rs. 8 crore were damaged in the city and around 638 persons were taken into preventive custody and 41 cases were booked under Section 151 of CrPc. Four cases were registered against agitators for attacks on private and government properties. The T Congress leaders then set another deadline till 31 July to continue with their agitations. In a protest seeking deletion of 14(f) section from presidential order, TRS youth wing leaders tore pages of the state song in government text books and made a bonfire of them.

Alarmed over the slogan of 'Telanganawale jaago, Andhrawale bhago' (Wake up Telangana people, Run away Andhra People) and attacks by Telangana activists on their branches of colleges in Hyderabad and surrounding areas, some colleges founded by people from Andhra region have incorporated the word "Telangana" into the name boards. The groups fighting for separate state are changing the boards of the government offices in districts like Warangal, Karimnagar and Medak. The name of Andhra Pradesh Tourism Development Corporation, for instance, has been changed to Telangana Tourism Development Corporation by the protestors. Andhra Bank has been renamed Telangana Bank and Andhra Pradesh State Road Transport Corporation has become Telangana State Road Transport Corporation.

On 8 September 2011 a World record breaking number of Postcards were sent by the youth and students of Ramagundam – Godavarikhani Town Area to the Prime Minister of India, Dr. Manmohan Singh demanding immediate formation of Telangana State with Hyderabad as its capital. A total of 15095 postcards were sent in 12 different languages creating a new World record of sending most number of postcards on a single day from a single location in an event organized by the members of FCI YUWA – Fertilizer City Youth Welfare Association.

== See also ==
- Samaikyandhra Movement
- Vishalandhra Movement
- Telangana Movement

Preceded by Early 2011 Telangana protests	Telangana movement April–August 2011	Succeeded by Late 2011 Telangana protests
