= Late 2011 Telangana protests =

2011 political protest in India

Coordinates: 17.99°N 79.59°E

The late 2011 Telangana protests refers to a chain of protests as part of Telangana movement between September and December 2011. Sakala Janula samme or All Peoples Strike is the biggest protest of all. The strike lasted for over six weeks, mainly affecting public services and the local economy. On a call given by JAC, road blockades on national highways throughout Telangana, rail blockade and the strike of the auto rikshaw union were organised on 24 and 25 September, causing disruption in transport services. As the All People's strike entered its 30th day on 14 October 2011, Medak's MP Vijayashanti criticised the Congress high command for the delay in making the decision on Telangana, and said Congress wanted the issue to be prolonged until 2014. She further said the strike should continue until the formation of the Telangana state. After 42 days, on 24 October, government employees unions called off the strike. Kodandaram said that the strike had impacted the overall thinking of the Centre towards the creation of a separate State and the movement would continue with other protest activities.

== Sakala Janula Samme ==
What are we demanding? We are asking you to respect the word you have given in the Parliament before the 120 crore people of this country. We are not asking any thing else.

— K. Chandrashekar Rao on 12 September 2011

On 12 September 2011, a day before Sakala Janula Samme (All people's Strike), TRS organised a public meeting in Karimnagar which was attended by over a million people including TJAC, BJP and New Democracy party leaders. Starting on 13 September, as part of a 'strike by all sections of people' supporting Telangana statehood, government employees throughout Telangana stayed out of work, lawyers boycotted courts and 60,000 coal miners of Singareni Collieries (SCCL Ltd.) joined the strike. On 14 and 15 September, nearly 450 movie theaters in Telangana were closed at the call given by Telangana Film Chamber. Starting on 16 September, government teachers joined the strike. Private school management declared a one-day holiday in support of the strike. On 19 September, state road transport corporation employees and state electricity board employees in Telangana joined the indefinite strike.

The rail roko programme at various places in the city became a conglomeration of various facets of the Telangana culture. With music, dance, plays and a sumptuous lunch, Manoharabad railway station, one of the hotspots, wore the look of a weekly fair.

— The New Indian Express

On a call given by JAC, road blockades on national highways throughout Telangana, rail blockade and the strike of the auto rikshaw union were organised on 24 and 25 September, causing disruption in transport services. Virtually all sections of society joined this strike.

On 30 September, as the strike entered its 18th day, even while Congress central leadership met several Telangana congress leaders, JAC called a bundh in Hyderabad city. On 2 October, JAC leaders, employee unions leaders and TRS leaders including KCR met the prime minister to explain the situation in Telangana due to the strike and asked for the decision on the statehood demand to be expedited.

The strike resulted in an unprecedented power crisis in the state, with only 223 MU of power generated against the demand of 275MU, impacting both industry and agriculture.

On 9 October, some workers of the Youth Congress agitated and threw chairs at each other at the Gandhi Bhavan in Hyderabad, demanding the postponement of a membership drive until an official announcement on Telangana. They also demanded that a separate Telangana Youth Congress be formed for the youth from Telangana. On 10 October, Telangana activists attacked a private college in Hyderabad and threw stones at the windows of a college in Kukatpally, where most residents are migrants from the Andhra region, badly damaging the window panes. Worried parents of some students protested outside the college, demanding that schools and colleges be excluded from the strikes and conflicts as the students had already missed classes for a month. Most colleges and schools remained shut in the twin cities of Hyderabad and Secunderabad.

There is no need to continue the strike as their opinion over Telangana is received already by Congress high command and the Centre.

— Nallari Kiran Kumar Reddy

After being criticised by the Congress high command and the Centre over how he had handled the issue, CM N Kiran Kumar Reddy said that the government would adopt a zero-tolerance system and would initiate stern action against anyone trying to create any law and order problem or cause inconvenience to the people. He cautioned them, saying that the stir was spoiling the prospects of the youth.

After 22 days of the strike, the APSRTC resumed plying buses after one of the unions suspended the strike. Telangana union leaders condemned the decision and said that a union leader belonging to Andhra-Seema region had no right to withdraw the strike. This led to a split in the union and Telangana union leaders floated a separate body and decided to continue the strike. Due to this, only a few buses returned to service.

On 13 October, the parents of many school-going children warned the TJAC to call off the strike for the schools and colleges by 15 October after which they would chalk out their course of action.

Eight Congress MPs from Telangana, who resigned in July demanding a separate state of Telangana, insisted that the speaker accept their resignations on 12 October. They also demanded that the Group-II exams, screening test for thousands of state government jobs, be postponed until the strike was over.

Sakala Janula Samme launched by the TJAC has already entered the 30th day. People of Telangana are facing several hardships due to the strike. Many Telangana youths have sacrificed their lives for the cause of Telangana. Despite all this, the Congress high command is unwilling to spell out its stand on the issue.

— Vijayashanti

As the All People's strike entered the 30th day on 14 October 2011, Medak's MP Vijayashanti criticised the Congress high command for the delay in making the decision on Telangana and said Congress wanted the issue to prolong until 2014. She said the strike should continue until the formation of Telanana state. On that day, the government of Andhra Pradesh decided to hold talks with the Employees Joint Action Committee and initiate action against uniformed personnel who had participated in the strike. KT Rama Rao alleged that the CM of Andhra Pradesh was bribing the T Congress MLAs to lure them out of the agitation. This was strongly refuted by the Congress leaders, who demanded an apology from KTR and challenged him to reveal the names of MLAs who took bribes.

On the first day of the rail blockade on 15 October, 110 trains were cancelled and 68 were diverted. The railways operated 12 trains and Hyderabad metro trails with full police protection. Telangana protestors tried to have a sit-in on rail platforms or tracks at various places. Police arrested thousands of protesters including eight MPs and four MLAs. On the same day, employee unions of the road transport corporation called off the strike. On 16 October, JAC gave a call for Telangana Bundh (general strike) for the next day to protest police action during the agitation and the rail blockade. They then cancelled the third day of the rail blockade.

The teachers' union said they would attend the schools in the interest of students but they would not sign the attendance registers and would not take salaries. Some teachers donated the salary they received for the strike period. They felt that teachers had become scapegoats at the hands of their state leaders who had a personal agenda, and called off the strike as part of this.

Normal life was again affected as the public transport facilities, especially busses, which were properly resumed after the 28-day-long strike were again off the roads. Schools, colleges and offices were again shut for 17 October, as the agitation continued. On the same day, coal miners called off their strike.

On 17 October, Pocharam Srinivas Reddy, who resigned from the assembly and TDP to join TRS, was re-elected to the assembly. He received about 68% of polled votes while his opponent from congress got 27% votes. TDP did not field a candidate. After his victory in the Banswada bypoll, by a far lesser margin than he anticipated, he warned Andhra settlers in the region with dire consequences for not voting for him. He had hoped for one lakh majority in the byelection in view of the ongoing high voltage Telangana movement. He accused Andhra settlers of ignoring the Telangana sentiment and voting for his opponent. This hurt the feelings of settlers in the region.

=== Efforts to end strike ===
With the agitation for statehood to Telangana intensifying, the congress decided to speed up all the discussions and quickly solve the problem.

On 30 September 2011 Ghulam Nabi Azad, Congress party's AP state in-charge, submitted to Congress president an internal party report about the Telangana issue after holding consultations with leaders from Telangana, Rayalaseema and coastal Andhra regions for over two months.

On 8 October, Azad said that the key leaders of the Congress and the centre had met nine leaders from Andhra Pradesh, including the chief minister, and were working on finding a solution to the issue as soon as possible. PM Manmohan Singh indicated that resolving the Telangana statehood issue might "take some time." He maintained that there had not been any "inaction" by the government over the crisis. He said that "given the complications involved in settlement, it will take some time." He said that the government "is engaged in widespread dialogue and discussions with all the stakeholders and hopes to reach a win-win situation for all concerned through the process."

After 42 days, on 24 October, government employees' unions called off the strike. Kodandaram said that the strike had impacted the overall thinking of the centre towards creation of a separate state, and the movement would continue with other protest activities.

=== Criticism of the strike ===
The Madiga Reservation Porata Samiti (MRPS) president criticised that KCR, TJAC Chairman Kodandaram, Harish Rao and others were encouraging students to take an active part in the ongoing agitation for Telangana, and alleged that they were not allowing their own children to take part in the stir. While they demanded that the Telangana leaders disclose the details of where their children were pursuing studies, he said that children from oppressed sections of society were being deprived of the opportunity to pursue studies, under the influence of the T-stir, while the children from the T-leaders were being sent abroad or other areas, to pursue studies without any disturbance. This opinion was also voiced by Samaikyandhra protagonists who pointed out that while farmers, school children, parents and the general public were facing untold misery due to the strike, the life of rich people like KCR continued to be luxurious as they drove in high-end cars and their children studied in top corporate schools, which remained open despite the crippling strike.

On 22 October, activists of the Prajasanghala (People's organisations) JAC protested in front of Prof. Kodandram's house, alleging that the TJAC had changed its stand on Sakala Janula Samme and on a separate Telangana after Kodandaram and KCR's visit to New Delhi. They alleged the TJAC had entered into a pact with the Centre and was deliberately diluting the movement.

On 11 October, a case was filed against KCR, under IPC section 153, for delivering instigating speeches and creating a rift between people from different regions in the state. FIR said that he had tried to instigate people to attack Telangana representatives for not resigning for the cause of Telangana. Later that day, police added the two leaders Swami Goud and Vithal of the Telangana Joint Action Committee after they demanded that the police of Hyderabad city would also join the struggle for a separate state. The Samaikyandhra Joint Action Committee reported that KCR was behaving rudely while he was in the Telangana region and wise when he was Delhi, at the Union government. They also demanded that the government seize the properties of KCR as to recover from the losses caused by the All People's Strike.

Many Telangana activists headed by Telangana Praja Front leader Gaddar contemplated forming a new party to take the Telangana movement forward. Dr Sangam Prithviraj, leader of the Telangana Students Joint Action Committee, who supported Gaddar in forming the new political force, also blamed KCR for the movement fizzling out. "KCR kept the students out of the agitation this time and this was an intentional ploy to ensure that the new state is not formed," he said.

=== Losses due to the strike ===
- While the striking employees of RTC got their wages and bonuses for the strike period, the corporation was hit by a financial crisis. APSRTC, which already had a Rs. 310 crore loss in the financial year, suffered another Rs. 200 crore loss due to the "Sakala Janula Samme".
- On 19 October, Singareni staff from three districts who were striking for 35 days resumed their work after the management agreed to adjust leave against the strike period with wages. The strike resulted in a loss of Rs. 600 crore for the Singareni Collieries Co Ltd. An additional Rs. 120 crores was lost towards payment of wages to employees for the strike period.
- A generation loss of 546.2 million units (MU) and 294.9 MU respectively in Ramagundam and Simhadri Thermal Power Stations situated in Andhra Pradesh was reported by NTPC due to a shortage of coal. Andhra Pradesh Power Generation Corporation Ltd. (APGENCO) reported a generation loss of 28 MU in their Kakatiya thermal power station during the same period.
- The state government lost around Rs. 250 crore due to power purchases from other states. The strike also affected the production of long steel in India.
- The water board suffered a Rs. 5 crore loss during the strike.
- The South Central railway lost Rs. 12.63 crores by 24 September due to the rail roko programmes.
- The Assocham estimated tangible losses in excess of Rs. 10,000 crores in only 15 days of the strike.
- There was a revenue loss of Rs. 50 crore every day by the government due to the strike by excise employees.
- Manufacturers of active pharmaceutical ingredients for medication lost Rs. 500 crore by 26 September because of the strike.
- Northern Power Distribution Company Ltd's (NPDCL) revenues amounting to Rs 320 crores were held up.

In response to a lawsuit that sought a direction that a new state should not be carved out from the parent territory, the Supreme Court of India took strong exception to the prolonged agitation during which normal life is affected, courts become paralysed and colossal damage is done to public property. It sought responses from the AP government and TRS.

== Aftermath ==
On 29 October 2011, three Congress party MLAs belonging to Telangana region resigned and joined TRS in protest as they were disappointed with Congress leadership's delay in Telangana state formation. With fears of Maoists infiltrating the Telangana movement, the CM of Andhra Pradesh was provided with a bulletproof podium for his speech on AP formation day on 1 November 2011.

On 1 November, Congress MLA Komatireddy Venkat Reddy started an indefinite hunger strike until the central government announced a roadmap for Telangana state. Five days later, the fast was broken when police arrested him under Section 309 of IPC (attempt to commit suicide) and shifted him to NIMS, Hyderabad where he was kept under intravenous fluids. He ended his fast on 9 November. The 97-year-old Freedom fighter Konda Laxman Bapuji also launched his week-long satyagraha at Jantar Mantar in New Delhi, demanding statehood to the region.

On 7 November 2011, actress Shriya Saran was attacked by a mob claiming to be TRS activists during a shoot in Hyderabad. They threatened her to say 'Jai Telangana' by shouting out curse words. The actress later tweeted,

How can they break my car, throw stones, stop shoot and threaten me to say Jai Telangana. That too in broad day light, Police staring at all of this. What about freedom and safety? Thank god the stone didn't hit me. Both the windows of my car are broken. I am disgusted, I'm born in India. I deserve my freedom and safety is my right.

TRS activists also attacked Parakala Prabhakar after a television interview in which he said that there was no Telangana sentiment among the people, and that whatever Prof. Jayashankar claimed about injustice meted out to Telangana was false propaganda.

On 10 November 2011, Andhra Pradesh State Director General of Police said there was no active involvement of Maoists in the Telangana movement. After the proposal by UP Chief Minister Mayawati to split Uttar Pradesh into four states, the BJP, a strong advocate of smaller states, demanded formation of the second State Reorganisation Commission (SRC) for restructuring and splitting big states into smaller ones.

Telangana is a complicated matter and we are trying to evolve a consensus, where all shades of public opinion would agree that what is being done is in the interest of each and everyone. We cannot solve the problem of Telangana by agreeing to Telangana State while there is disquiet and unrest in other regions of Andhra Pradesh. From the frying pan to the fire is not an appropriate solution to the National problem

— Indian Prime Minister Manmohan Singh on 12 November 2011

Minister of State for Home Affairs, Jitendra Singh informed in the Rajya Sabha that the government of India would move to create a new state only when there is a consensus in the parent state that one part be separated to form a new state.

In December 2011, TRS Politburo member C Sudhakar was sentenced to one year in jail under the provisions of the National Security Act. He was arrested during the Sakala Janula Samme on the charges that he had thrown stones at RTC buses and prevented Andhra region buses from plying in Telangana.

On 19 January 2012, BJP led by State party president Kishan Reddy started the 22-day Telangana 'Poru Yatra', a journey of 3500 km in Telangana, to reach 986 villages and 88 assembly constituencies. Though the tour was successful in reiterating the party's pro-Telangana stance, it did not garner as much support as hoped because of the indifferent attitude of the TRS and TJAC. In fact, the failure of the TRS in declaring its support to Kishan Reddy's yatra resulted in growing differences between the two parties.

== See also ==
- Samaikyandhra Movement
- Vishalandhra Movement
- Telangana Movement

Preceded by Mid 2011 Telangana protests	Telangana movement September–November 2011	Succeeded by 2012 Telangana protests
