= Early 2011 Telangana protests =

Protests demanding Telangana State

Coordinates: 17.99°N 79.59°E

The early 2011 Telangana protests refers to a chain of events that took place during the early months of 2011, after the Srikrishna committee report was submitted to government of India. These protests are part of Telangana movement. The Telangana political JAC declared the launch of a non-cooperation movement throughout Telangana, including the state capital at Hyderabad, starting on 17 February. The plan was to request government employees not to work; people not to pay taxes or utility bills; people not to buy tickets while using public transport; to organise rallies; to block traffic on highways; and other measures. It is reported that Congress party's central leadership told Telangana MPs that it will take a decision on Telangana after assembly elections in several states in May. On 24 February, Telangana political JAC organised Egypt-like mass protests in Hyderabad beginning 10 March. Projections for number of people to be mobilised varied from one to five million. Protesters raised slogans of 'Jai Telangana', sang pro-Telangana songs, and played games. Protesters included activists of various political parties, students, government employees, lawyers, doctors, teachers, journalists, writers and cultural artists. 48 people were arrested for the vandalism of the statues. A Telangana leader said the incident show the hatred towards leaders of Andhra and he fears more such incidents if the central government further delays the process to carve out separate Telangana state. Osmania University students warned non-Telangana staff of the university to not pass on the identities of agitators to the police and warned them they could become targets if they did not join the agitation.

== Non-cooperation movement ==
The Telangana political JAC declared the launch of a non-cooperation movement throughout Telangana, including the state capital at Hyderabad, starting on 17 February. The plan was to request government employees not to work; people not to pay taxes or utility bills; people not to buy tickets while using public transport; to organise rallies; to block traffic on highways; and other measures. Around 200,000 government employees in Telangana participated by boycotting work and holding rallies or playing sports at the workplace while TRS MLAs travelled ticket-less in local trains.

The Telangana JAC called for the shutdown of all services, except emergency services, in Telangana on 22 and 23 February. Educational institutions, private and public offices, commercial establishments, industrial areas, private and public transport, and outpatient services in hospitals were closed as unions, organisations, and individuals actively participated in the strike by having rallies, hunger strikes, community meals on roads, and other protests. The strike was mostly peaceful barring a few incidents. The state government continued to lose Rs 8 billion per day in revenue due to the non-cooperation movement.

=== Protests in Assembly ===
Legislative Assembly proceedings were disrupted by Telangana legislators on the first day of the budget session, as the Governor's address to the assembly did not include the Telangana issue. 22 MLAs and six MLCs from Congress boycotted the first day of the Assembly session. Telangana proponents have criticised the alleged anti-Telangana behaviour of Governor E. S. L. Narasimhan. TRS MLAs had heated arguments and gheraoed Lok Satta MLA Jayaprakash Narayan who had condemned the attack on the governor. One of them, K Vidyasagar Rao assaulted him first, followed by blows by the driver of another TRS MLA E Rajender who justified the attack. TRS later denied they attacked him but questioned his respect for Telangana sentiments. On 18 February five MLAs were suspended for unruly behaviour and for manhandling the governor. Deputy Speaker N Manohar termed this as shameful for democracy.

=== Incidents of violence ===
In the first two days of the non-cooperation movement, the government lost ₹15 billion in revenue. On 19 February, Telangana protesters burnt down five buses and set fire to police tents in and around the Osmania University campus. On 21 February a march of Telangana students and lawyers to Assembly turned violent when they were blocked by security forces. The police commissioner warned television channels against telecasting violence. Telangana cable operators blocked out TV news channels owned by Seema-Andhra industrialists citing their alleged 'anti-Telangana' stand. TRS leaders and activists attacked APTransco billing counters in Karimnagar town and pulled down tent of CPI(M) activists who were protesting on civic issues at the municipal office in Warangal.

On 22 February, at Ellapur railway station in Hasanparty mandal, trains were stranded for an hour after pro-Telangana agitators removed hook locks from the rail tracks. Pro-Telangana activists halted the Delhi-bound AP Express at Kazipet railway station for 15 minutes on the same day. Before the train reached Kazipet, a few students rained stones on the AP Express at Ellapur in Hasanparty mandal. As many as 114 cases were booked under Section 151 of the CrPc and 1,978 persons were taken into custody. Pro-Telangana students and lawyers ransacked the MMTS station on Necklace road and the reservation office was set afire. A car showroom was ransacked at Habsiguda and an attempt was made to burn a train at Jamia Osmania station. On 23 February pro-Telangana protesters set one bogie of the Kazipet-Manguru passenger on fire near Kesamudram railway station in Karimnagar district. Three buses of a private engineering college parked near Habsiguda were set ablaze by suspected Telangana activists on 24 February. On 2 March, Pro-Telangana activists disrupted a film shooting by burning down the set.

Telangana universities, especially Osmania University, have had a heavy police presence since December 2009. Telangana political JAC chairman Professor Kodandaram alleged that police from Seema-Andhra region were very brutal towards Telangana students. The refusal of the police to allow students to organise rallies provoked pitched battles between police and students, and arrests of students, which leads to more protests. Police behaviour was criticised by human rights activists and by the High Court. On 21 February students hurled stones at the security personnel at Adikmet and Nizam College hostel at Basheerbagh area, forcing the police to use tear gas shells to disperse them. Policemen reported that Osmania University students protesting for Telangana have used petrol bombs to target police personnel on duty at the campus. Suicides continue to be a form of protests by Telanganites, despite appeals by various leaders, parties, and organizations to stop.

=== Protests in Parliament ===
Telangana parliament members belonging to the ruling party protested in Parliament on 22 February for Telangana not being mentioned in the government agenda. They threatened to immolate themselves on Parliament premises if Telangana state is not created On 23 February, proceedings in Lok Sabha were paralysed when opposition parties joined Telangana MPs in protests. Twelve Telangana MLAs were suspended on 23 February; On 24 February, fifteen members of the ruling party from Telangana joined the protests. Sushma Swaraj, leader of the opposition in Parliament (Lok Sabha) and Bharatiya Janata Party (BJP) leader, said "it was rare that eleven members from the ruling Congress wanted a discussion and they were being silenced. The Telangana issue can be resolved immediately if the Prime Minister simply announces in the House that a Bill supporting the creation of Telangana would be brought in this session itself. I promise you that our party, BJP and our allies will support such bill." Asaduddin Owaisi, president of All India Majlis-e-Ittehadul Muslimeen party, remarked that his party will not allow or want Hyderabad to be made a Union Territory. He said that if Telangana is created, then Hyderabad has to be a part of it.

On 24 February, Telangana political JAC declared that the non-cooperation movement will continue until Telangana state is achieved. Their plans included rallies over the weekend, a rail blockade on 1 March, and Egypt-like mass protests in Hyderabad. They hoped to mobilise five million people from throughout Telangana in the second week of March. The police department is one of the departments which is not participating the non-cooperation movement. Employees of the office of the Medak district police superintendent joined the movement. The state police chief clarified that the protesting employees were office staff, not policemen. There are reports that policemen are contemplating joining the agitation. On 1 March a train blockade by pro-Telangana protesters, with a theme of "villages on railway tracks", paralysed train services throughout Telangana. Protestors cooked and played sports; and students held essay competitions on the railway tracks. Travel was difficult because the railways are the primary mode of transportation in India for long-distance travellers.

99 out of 119 legislators from Telangana, including those from ruling party, boycotted Assembly proceedings. Of remaining the legislators, 16 are ministers. BJP, CPI, and MIM legislators remained in the house. On 3 March Parliament proceedings were disrupted whole day due to protests by Telangana MPs with the support of BJP members.

=== Strike call-off ===
On 4 March, Congress MPs from Telangana who were requested by party incharges to wait appeared in the Lok Sabha with black bands around their mouths to indicate that there was a gag order by their party leadership. Their refusal to remove those black bands caused the speaker to adjourn the house. On 3 March Telangana employees said they will not call off their agitation unless there is a firm assurance from the centre on formation of separate Telangana state. The next day, the state government gave a written assurance to employees to press the centre for deletion of clause 14 (f) from the Presidential Order, removing free zone status to Hyderabad, and set up judicial commission to ensure strict enforcement of GO 610. The state gave assurances that employees will be permitted a delegation to the Prime Minister to request the division of the state. Employees union said they will resume the non-cooperation movement after students exams are over in April. after the Congress party's central leadership reportedly told Telangana MPs that it will take a decision on Telangana after assembly elections in several states in May. Congress legislators from Telangana ended their boycott on 14 March, citing their responsibility to see the state budget passed.

== Million March 2011 ==
=== Preparations ===
On 26 February, TJAC announced that it will organise Egypt-like mass protests in Hyderabad beginning 10 March. Projections for number of people to be mobilised varied from one to five million. Some parents' associations and teachers appealed to the JAC to postpone the protest as the gathering of a "million" people might cause inconvenience to the students appearing for the ongoing Class X, XII and CBSE exams. Three days before the proposed march, the JAC chairman said that the march would not be on the scale on which it was originally planned, which included "laying siege" to Hyderabad, and the march would start in the afternoon instead of morning, in view of final exams to students in the morning.

Police issued prohibitory orders to prevent gatherings and set up check-posts at the district borders of Hyderabad, as no permission had been granted for the march. Police took a large number of activists into preventive custody including the Osmania University JAC president and put up barricades in all nine Telangana districts and on the outskirts of Hyderabad to prevent activists joining the protest. TJAC chairman M. Kodandaram alleged that police arrested 100,000 people including 11,000 in Hyderabad; he asked, "People can protest in Egypt and Tunisia but not in Hyderabad?" He said the march needed no permission as it would be peaceful. South Central Railway (SCR) cancelled four express trains and 43 passenger trains connecting various districts of Telangana with Hyderabad. Multi-Modal Transport System (MMTS) train service was suspended on three out of four routes in the cities of Hyderabad and Secunderabad and the outskirts.

=== Day of the demonstration ===
On the day of the march, over 12,000 personnel from police and central paramilitary forces were deployed in the city. Traffic was diverted by police and no one was allowed to areas close to Tank Bund, the secretariat, Raj Bhavan, and the assembly. Students clashed with police when they were locked inside the Osmania University to prevent them from taking out a rally to Tank Bund. Police fired teargas shells to control the students. Several pro-Telangana leaders, including 50 MLAs belonging to the BJP, CPI, Muslim League, TRS, TDP, and Jamat-e-Islami parties and JAC convenor Kodandaram, were arrested as soon as they started their rally. The police arrested people coming to Tank Bund area until 1 pm. After 1 pm the activists started reaching Tank Bund in groups from different directions and outnumbered the police. The protestors uprooted barricades put up on both ends of the road, and by 3 pm thousands of protestors were gathered. Telangana agitators pretended to perform 'marriages' in the Arya Samaj building to slip into the Lower Tank Bund. BJP leader and Doctor J Bapu Reddy, along with four of his followers, travelled in an ambulance from Nizamabad to Hyderabad through the checkpoints to attend the march by informing the police that a "seriously ill patient" was being taken to hospital in Hyderabad. Protestors raised slogans of 'Jai Telangana', sang pro-Telangana songs, and played games. Protestors included activists of various political parties, students, government employees, lawyers, doctors, teachers, journalists, writers and cultural artists.

Telangana activists attacked pro-Telangana Congress MPs Madhu Yaskhi Goud and K. Keshava Rao by throwing slippers & water bottles citing their failure to resign in support of the separate statehood agitation. While the police estimated 20,000 people participated in the march, the JAC estimate was 100,000. The BBC reported a turnout of 50,000. At around 3:15 a student of Osmania university attempted suicide by consuming poison on Tank bund road, saying "Jai Telangana". His suicide letter said, "In spite of voting for them (public representatives), they could not succeed in achieving separate statehood for Telangana and my suicide is a reminder for them that people are willing to die for Telangana.". Doctors confirmed that his situation is improving. Later protesters demanded that the police release all the leaders they arrested and bring them to Tank bund. Several patients in critical condition were locked out of the emergency ward of the Gandhi hospital for over two hours from 2.30 pm, following a flash strike by the doctors demanding the release of their colleagues who had been arrested by the police. Around 4 pm, after KCR and Kondaram arrived at Tank bund, all the participants in the rally vowed to fight for formation of Telangana state by saying a pledge.

=== Destruction of statues ===
Pro-Telangana activists damaged 16 statues representing Telugu culture language on Tank Bund. They threw some of the remnants into the lake. The agitators used iron rods and ropes from the barricades put up by the police to uproot the statues. The agitators did not touch the statues of Nizam VI Mir Mahaboob Ali Khan. These statues were installed by state government in 1986.

The protests were reportedly designed to deepen linguistic and political divides between pro- and anti-Telangana groups. The police say the attack was pre-planned. Three TRS activists who in the early hours of 10 March burnt the statue of 'Telangana Talli' in Medak district were arrested. The TRS MLA and son of Mr Chandrasekhar Rao, Mr K.T. Rama Rao (KTR), had said earlier that they would damage the statues on Tank Bund as most of them, according to him, were of people from the Coastal Andhra/Rayalaseema region. KTR in a speech in October 2010 gave an ultimatum to the government to install a statue of Komaram Bheem, Telangana freedom fighter, on the Tank Bund or else the existing statues would not be allowed to remain. Telangana proponents alleged that the Coastal-Andhra/Rayalaseema ruling class installed those statues intentionally ignoring prominent personalities from Telangana. Agitators set a police vehicle on fire and attacked a vehicle and crew of a TV channel broadcasting the mayhem Nearly 30 video cameras and six photo cameras belonging to six different TV channels were snatched, damaged, or thrown in the water. Many media persons were manhandled and some of them were injured. The protestors looted and set on fire an ATM of Andhra Bank, a government office, and damaged the windows of a hotel.

The Chief Minister, Mr N. Kiran Kumar Reddy, had instructed the police to refrain from firing, fearing preventable deaths and consequent stirring up of emotions even further. Some Telangana leaders in the rally tried to stop the destruction of the statues and attacks on the media. It was also alleged that none of the leaders including Mr Chandrasekhar Rao, Gaddar or the BJP leader, Mr Bandaru Dattatreya, who were present at Tank Bund tried to stop the mob. Around 6 pm, the protestors began to leave the venue and by 6:30 the whole area became calm.

=== Reactions ===
Top leaders of all political parties in the state condemned the vandalism. "At least now the government should install the statues of Telangana figures at the Tank Bund", it said. Kodandaram, who visited Tank Bund in the evening after he was released by police, claimed that the march was a huge success. He demanded the immediate release of all Telangana activists and leaders. He regretted the damage to the statues and the attacks on the media and said that such vandalism was against Telangana culture. He suspected plain cloths policemen could be involved in the vandalism. 48 people were arrested for the vandalism of the statues. A Telangana leader said the incident showed the hatred towards Andhra people for their industrial might which did not give enough space for them to open industries and compete and he feared more such incidents if the central government further delays the process to carve out separate Telangana state. The police came to the conclusion that the TRS, IFTU, CPI-ML New Democracy, Osmania University students, and the TRSV were behind the violence. Telugu scholars, poets, political leaders, and local residents mourned and offered homage to the statues destroyed in what was termed Talibanic way. Kamalakara Swamy of Hindu Devalaya Parirakshana Samiti said, "These statues of saints like Annamacharya are like temples for us. How is the 500-year-old Srikrishna Devaraya statue concerned with the Telangana movement!”(Statue is 25 years old. Srikrishna Devaraya lived 500 years back) The Maharashtra Telugu Manch (MTM) president said, "The destruction of statues on the Tank bund has hurt sentiments of all the Telugus. It is definitely sending wrong signals about the Telangana movement".

Protesting the destruction of statues, people organised a 'padayatra'(a form of protest rally) on the Tank Bund Road and offered homage to the great personalities seeking apologies for the disrespect heaped on them. "They (Telangana supporters) can secure statehood. We have nothing against it. But this desecration of statues is totally unjustified. These great personalities are not confined to any region", Garikapati Narasimha Rao, a famous Telugu scholar said. "Even if 10 lakh bulls marched on the Tank Bund road, they would not have caused any harm to the statues", Jonnavithula Ramalingeswara Rao, a poet remarked.

President of Telangana Jagruti (the cultural wing of TRS) and daughter of K Chandrasekhar Rao, Kavita, in a Telangana "self-respect" rally warned the government against re-installing the demolished statues without installing the statues of Telangana personalities. She threatened that her activists will demolish the statues again if they were reinstalled before the creation of Telangana state. Kodandram said he does not think the destruction was an act against the contributions of those figures. He said that the protestors were angry with the police for creating obstructions to the march and they directed their anger at the statues, which represented the Seema-Andhra. He denied any conspiracy to destroy the statues. Osmania University students warned non-Telangana staff of the university to not pass on the identities of agitators to the police and warned them they could become targets if they did not join the agitation.

== See also ==
- Samaikyandhra Movement
- Vishalandhra Movement
- Telangana Movement
- Prof Kodandaram on Telangana Movement Million march- Documentary

Preceded by Srikrishna committee's involvement	Telangana movement February–March 2011	Succeeded by Mid 2011 Telangana protests
