= Green Credit Programme =

21st century initiative in India

Green Credit Programme is a programme announced by the Ministry of Environment, Forest and Climate Change of the Government of India in October 2023 as part of the Lifestyle for Environment (LiFE) initiative proposed by Prime Minister Narendra Modi at the Conference of the Parties to the UNFCCC (COP27) held in Sharm El-Sheikh, Egypt in 2022.

== Objective ==
The Green Credit Programme was announced on 13 October 2023 as part of the Lifestyle for Environment (LiFE) initiative proposed by Prime Minister Narendra Modi at the conference of COP held in Sharm El-Sheikh, Egypt. It is claimed to be a market-based mechanism driven aim of providing incentives for participating in voluntary environmental actions across different sectors consisting of individuals, societies and industries and companies in private sector. The scheme aims at promoting plantation on degraded wasteland and helps in generating green credits.

== Types of activities ==
The Green Credit Programme covers eight types of activities 1.Credit for Tree Plantation 2. Green Credit for Water 3.Green Credit for Sustainable Agriculture 4. Green Credit for Waste Management 5.Green Credit for reducing air pollution 6. Green Credit for Mangrove conservation and rotation 7.Green Credit for Eco Mark 8. Green Credit for Sustainable Building and Infrastructure.

== Procedure ==
Green Credit Programme is designed to avail credit by online registration by the firm of its activities electronically and claim green credit.

== See also ==
- Carbon offsets and credits
