= Telangana: The State of Affairs =

2009 book

- Author: M. Bharath Bhushan; N. Venugoal
- Cover artist: Ramanajeevi
- Language: English
- Subject: Telangana movement Regionalism
- Publisher: AdEd Value Ventures, Hyderabad
- Publication date: August 2009
- Publication place: India
- Pages: 210
- OCLC: 460939250

Telangana: The State of Affairs is a book edited by M. Bharath Bhushan and N. Venugopal.

== Synopsis ==
The book analyses the issues of regional discrimination, identity and its construction. It explains rationale for the demand for separate Statehood for Telangana. The book comprises essays by Duncan B. Forrester, N Venugopal, M Bharath Bhushan, Dean E. McHenry Jr., K Naresh Kumar, S V Srinivas, Radhika Rajamani and translation of two short stories by P V Narasimha Rao and Allam Rajayya.
