= Conference of the parties =

Supreme governing body of an international convention

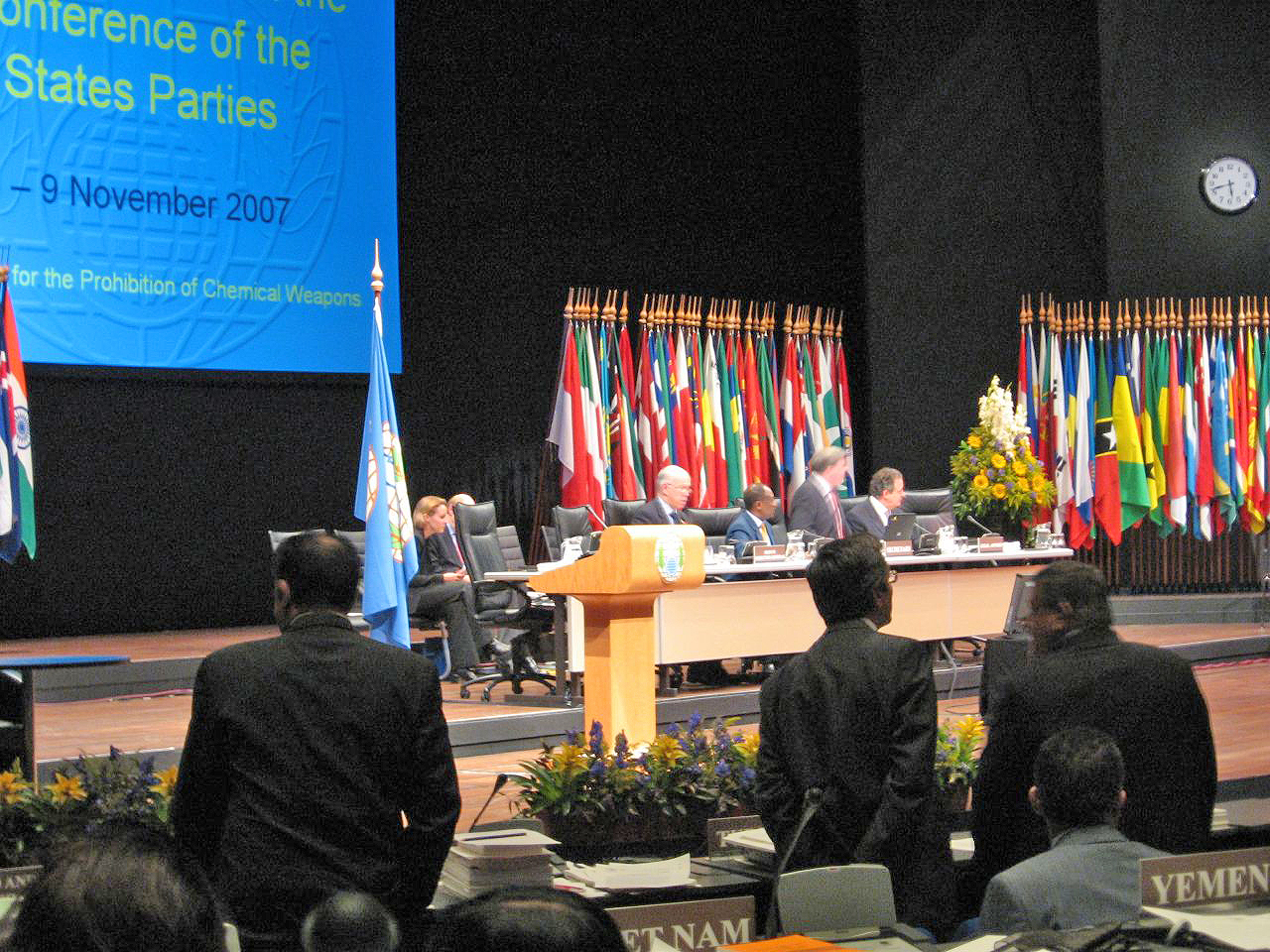
A conference of the parties of the Chemical Weapons Convention, in 2007

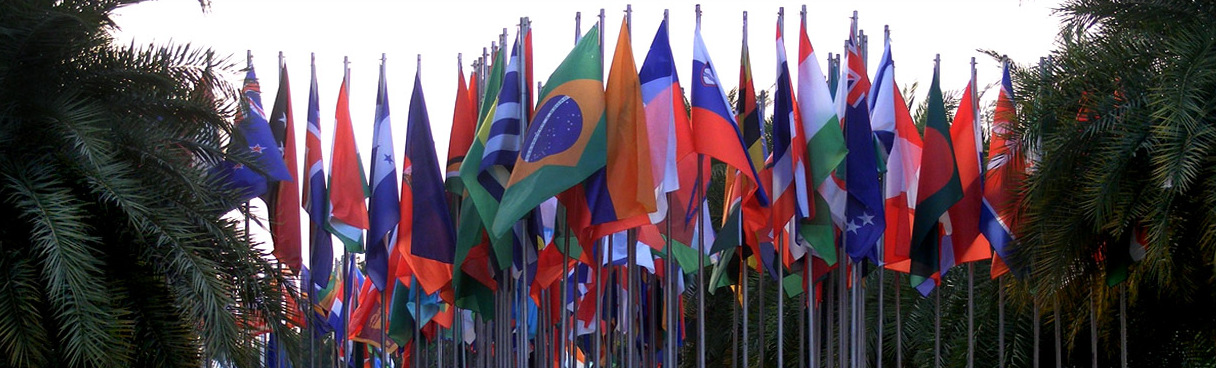
Flags at the 2012 Hyderabad Biodiversity Conference

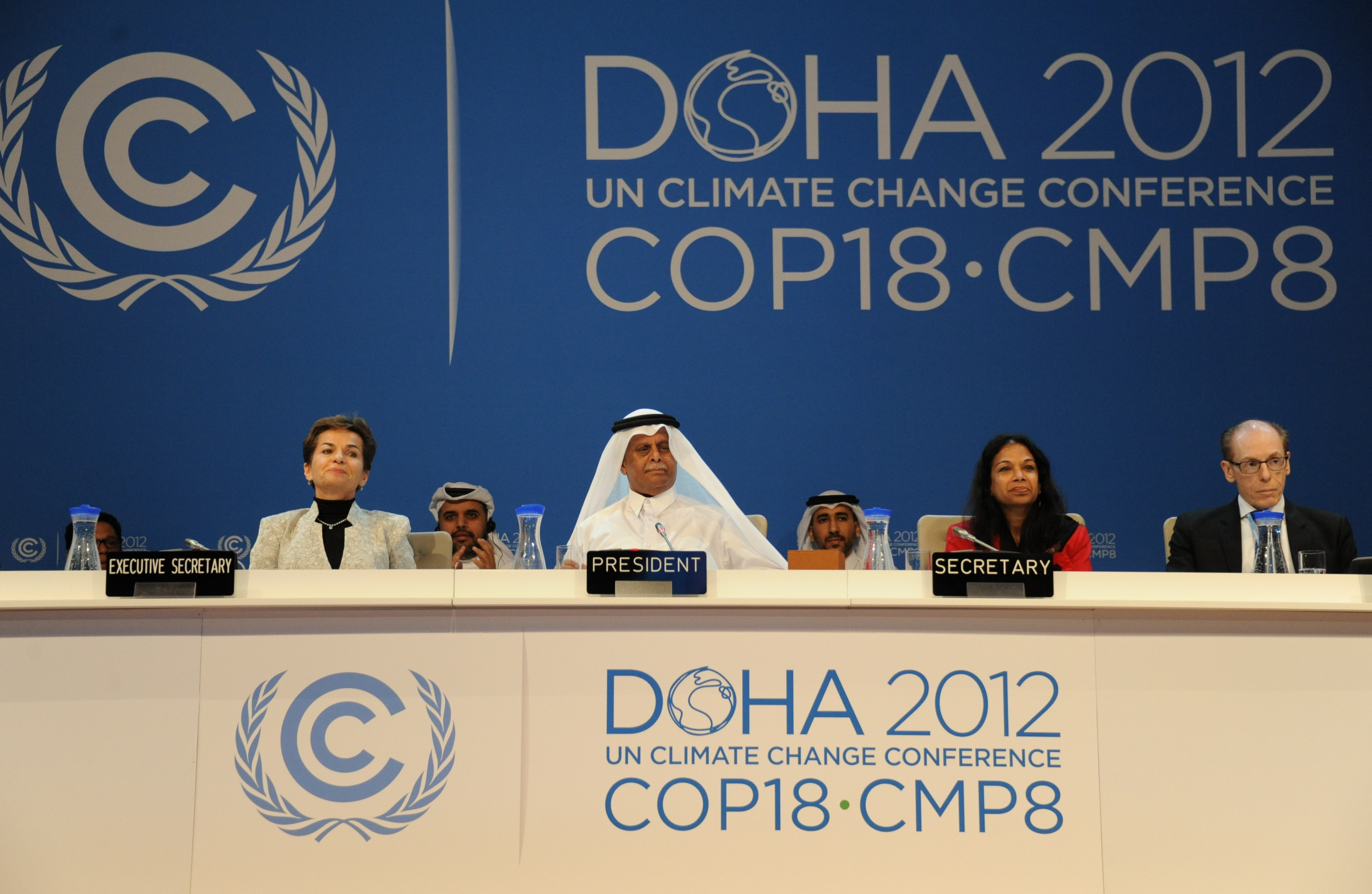
A meeting of the 2012 United Nations Climate Change Conference

A conference of the parties (COP; French: Conférence des Parties, CP) is the supreme governing body of an international convention (treaty, written agreement between actors in international law). It is composed of representatives of the member states of the convention and accredited observers. The scope of the COP is to review the "implementation of the Convention and any other legal instruments that the COP adopts and take decisions necessary to promote the effective implementation of the Convention".

Conventions with a COP include:

- Basel Convention
- Chemical Weapons Convention
- Convention on Biological Diversity
  - 2012 Hyderabad Biodiversity Conference (COP11)
  - 2022 United Nations Biodiversity Conference (COP15)
- Convention on the Conservation of Migratory Species of Wild Animals
- Convention on International Trade in Endangered Species of Wild Fauna and Flora
- Kyoto Protocol
- Minamata Convention on Mercury
- Ramsar Convention
- Rotterdam Convention
- Stockholm Convention on Persistent Organic Pollutants
- Treaty on the Non-Proliferation of Nuclear Weapons
- United Nations Convention to Combat Desertification
- United Nations Convention against Corruption
- United Nations Framework Convention on Climate Change
  - United Nations Climate Change Conference
- WHO Framework Convention on Tobacco Control

== See also ==
- Conference of the Parties (disambiguation)
- International law
