= Conference of the Parties =

Conference of the Parties may refer to:

- United Nations Climate Change conference (Conference of the Parties), meeting of the UNFCCC parties
- Conference of the Parties (CITES)
- Conference of the Parties (Convention on Biological Diversity)
- Conference of the Parties (UNCCD), the supreme decision-making body of the United Nations Convention to Combat Desertification

== See also ==
- Conference of the parties
