= Battleground Telangana =

Battleground Telangana: Chronicle of an Agitation
- First edition
- Author: Kingshuk Nag
- Language: English
- Subject: Telangana movement
- Publisher: HarperCollins
- Publication date: July 2011
- Publication place: India
- ISBN: 978-93-5029-074-3

Battleground Telangana: Chronicle of an Agitation is a book written by Kingshuk Nag, a journalist and editor of The Times of India, about the Telangana movement in and before the formation of the state of Andhra Pradesh, India. It was released in July 2011.

== Synopsis ==
The book traces the history of the Telangana region and explains the cultural backgrounds of that and the Andhra region. It discusses its past during the rule of the Nizams of Hyderabad, its people's fight for basic needs, as well as the Andhra region under the British Raj era when it was part of Madras Presidency.
