= Disputes between Andhra Pradesh and Telangana =

Indian state relations

Following the bifurcation of undivided Andhra Pradesh in 2014, Telangana and residual Andhra Pradesh continued to fight over issues such as assets division, river water sharing and return of five villages near Bhadrachalam to Telangana. In 2024, a new beginning was made with the meeting between the newly elected chief ministers on 6 July 2024. The chief ministers decided to constitute committees at the level of chief secretaries and ministers to speed up resolution.

== Assets division with Telangana ==
There are 91 institutions under schedule IX with assets of ₹1.42 lakh crore, 142 institutions under schedule X with assets of ₹24,018.53 crore, and another 12 institutions not mentioned in the act with assets of ₹1,759 crore, which are to be split between Andhra Pradesh and Telangana following the bifurcation. An expert committee headed by Sheela Bhide gave a recommendation for bifurcation of 89 out of the 91 schedule IX institutions. Telangana selectively accepted the recommendations, while Andhra Pradesh asked for their acceptance in total. The division of the RTC headquarters and the Deccan Infrastructure and Landholdings Limited (DIL) with huge land parcels has become contentious. Despite several meetings of the trilateral dispute resolution committees, no progress was made. The Andhra Pradesh government filed a suit in the Supreme Court.

== Krishna river water sharing dispute ==
Andhra Pradesh and Telangana continue to dispute the water share of the Krishna River. In 1969, the Bachawat tribunal for the allocation of water shares among the riparian states allocated 811 tmcft of water to Andhra Pradesh. The Andhra Pradesh government of that time split it in a 512:299 tmcft ratio between Andhra Pradesh (including the basin area of Rayalaseema) and Telangana, respectively. It was based on the utilisation facilities established at that time. Though the tribunal recommended the use of the Tungabhadra Dam (a part of the Krishna Basin) to provide water to the drought-prone Mahabubnagar area of Telangana, this was not implemented. The bifurcation act advised the formation of the Krishna River Management Board (KRMB) and the Godavari River Management Board (GRMB) for resolving disputes between the new states. In 2015, the two states agreed to share water in the 66:34 (AP:Telangana) ratio as an interim arrangement in a meeting with the central water ministry, which is to be reviewed every year. This practice continued without further review. Telangana filed a suit in the Supreme Court for a 70% share. Following the assurance of the formation of a tribunal to resolve the issue, Telangana withdrew its suit. The centre formulated the terms of reference for KWDT-2 in Oct 2023.

== Godavari water sharing dispute ==
Andhra Pradesh got 1172.78 tmcft of Godavari water. Telangana is utilising 433 tmcft for its completed projects, while Andhra Pradesh's share is 739 tmcft. The Andhra Pradesh government has opposed Telangana submitting a detailed project report for additional utilisation through new or upgraded projects such as Kaleswaram, Tupakulagudem, Sitarama, Mukteswaram, and Modikunta lift irrigation projects.

== Five villages near Bhadrachalam ==
The 1.50-metre increase in the height of the Polavaram coffer dam to 44 metres raised the suspicion that it led to flooding of Bhadrachalam and nearby villages in Telangana along the Godavari river in 2022. Three mandals that were originally part of Andhra state were transferred back to Andhra Pradesh, excluding Bhadrachalam town, to support the Polavaram project, as those areas are likely to be submerged. Telangana would like to take back five villages on the river banks for ease of movement of its government machinery to provide rehabilitation support to its other villages beyond them, to which the Andhra Pradesh government is objecting.
