= Telangana movement =

Movement for the separate state of Telangana, in India

Coordinates: 17.99°N 79.59°E

The Telangana movement refers to the movement for the separation of Telangana, from the pre-existing state of Andhra Pradesh in India. The new state corresponds to the Telugu-speaking portions of the former princely state of Hyderabad, which were merged with Andhra Pradesh in 1956.

After decades of protests and agitation, the central government, under the United Progressive Alliance, decided to bifurcate the Andhra Pradesh state and on 2 June 2014, the Union Cabinet unilaterally cleared the bill for the creation of Telangana. Lasting for almost 5 decades, it was one of the longest lasting movements for statehood in South India. On 18 February 2014, the Lok Sabha passed the bill with a voice vote. The bill was passed by the Rajya Sabha two days later, on 20 February. As per the bill, Hyderabad would be the capital of Telangana, while the city would also remain the capital of the residual state of Andhra Pradesh for no more than ten years. Hyderabad was the de jure joint capital. On 2 June 2014, Telangana was created with K. Chandrashekar Rao as its first chief minister.

== History ==
Map of India with the Telangana region highlighted in red colour

In December 1953, the States Reorganisation Commission was appointed to prepare for the creations of states on linguistic lines. The commission, due to public demand, recommended disintegration of Hyderabad State and a merger of the Marathi-speaking region with Bombay state and of the Kannada-speaking region with Mysore state. The States Reorganisation Commission (SRC) discussed pros and cons of the merger of Telugu speaking Telangana region of Hyderabad state with Andhra state. Paragraph 374 of the SRC report said "The creation of Vishalandhra is an ideal to which numerous individuals and public bodies, both in Andhra and Telangana, have been passionately attached over a long period of time, and unless there are strong reasons to the contrary, this sentiment is entitled to consideration". Discussing the case of Telangana, paragraph 378 of the SRC report said "One of the principal causes of opposition of Vishalandhra also seems to be the apprehension felt by the educationally backward people of Telangana that they may be swamped and exploited by the more advanced people of the coastal areas who were swamped by people of Tamil Nadu already". In its final analysis SRC recommended against the immediate merger. In paragraph 386 it said "After taking all these factors into consideration we have come to the conclusions that it will be in the interests of Andhra as well as Telangana, if for the present, the Telangana area is to constitute into a separate State, which may be known as the Hyderabad State with provision for its unification with Andhra after the general elections likely to be held in or about 1961 if by a two-thirds majority the legislature of the residuary Hyderabad State expresses itself in favor of such unification." The first movement was in Illandu, Khammam district Starting with Polikeka, 1965, 1966 from there Starting from and reaching 1967 Reaching out to universities and students.

== Telangana state arguments ==
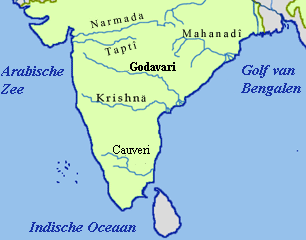
A map showing several rivers including the Godavari and Krishna. Both the rivers flow into Coastal Andhra and through Telangana

Telangana was the largest of the three regions of Andhra Pradesh state, covering 41.47% of its total area. It is inhabited by 40.54% of the state's population. The following is the breakup of Andhra Pradesh's revenue by region:

Source	Percentage of total revenue
Telangana (including Hyderabad)	45.47%
Telangana (excluding Hyderabad District, but including parts of GHMC in suburbs)	8.30%
Hyderabad District	37.17%
Coastal Andhra	24.71%
Rayalaseema	8.90%
Central Government	19.86%

Note: The income generated by the capital city of the erstwhile Andhra Pradesh is a complex issue with income being generated from all regions. This has caused a lot of confusion in region-wise income distribution. Also, after the bifurcation, companies will pay their portion of taxes to Telangana or present day Andhra Pradesh depending on where they operate. Before the bifurcation, many companies paid taxes to capital city Hyderabad for their operations in Seemandhra.

Proponents of a separate Telangana state cite perceived injustices in the distribution of water, budget allocations, and jobs. Within the state of Andhra Pradesh, 68.5% of the catchment area of the Krishna River and 69% of the catchment area of the Godavari River are in the plateau region of Telangana and flowing through the other parts of the state into the Bay of Bengal. Telangana and non-coastal parts of Karnataka and Maharashtra states form Deccan Plateau. Telangana supporters state that 74.25% of irrigation water through the canal system under major irrigation projects goes to the Coastal Andhra region, while Telangana gets 18.20%. The remaining 7.55% goes to the Rayalaseema region.

As per Volume-II of Krishna Water Dispute Tribunal Award, "The area which we are considering for irrigation formed part of Hyderabad State and had there been no division of that State, there were better chances for the residents of this area to get irrigation facilities in Mahboobnagar District. We are of the opinion that this area should not be deprived of the benefit of irrigation on account of the reorganisation of States."

The share of education funding for Telangana ranges from 9.86% in government-aided primary schools to 37.85% in government degree colleges. The above numbers include the expenditure in Hyderabad. Budget allocations to Telangana are generally less than 1/3 of the total Andhra Pradesh budget. There are allegations that in most years, funds allocated to Telangana were never spent. Since 1956, Andhra Pradesh government established 11 new medical colleges in the state. 8 were in Seemandhra and only 3 were in Telangana. Telangana was not compensated for lost opportunities because of inward migration of lot of students into Hyderabad from Seemandhra.

According to Professor Jayashankar only 20% of the total Government employees, less than 10% of employees in the secretariat, and less than 5% of department heads in the Andhra Pradesh government are from Telangana; those from other regions make up the bulk of employment. He also alleged that the state was represented by Telangana chief ministers for only 6 1/2 years out of over five decades of its existence, with no chief minister from the region being in power continuously for more than 2 1/2 years. As per Srikrishna committee on Telangana, Telangana held the position of CM for 10.5 years while Seema-Andhra region held it for 42 years.

According to the Backward Regions Grant Fund 2009–10, 13 backward districts are located in Andhra Pradesh: nine (all except Hyderabad) are from Telangana and the rest are from other regions.

Proponents of a separate Telangana state feel that the agreements, plans, and assurances from the legislature and Lok Sabha over the last fifty years have not been honoured, and as a consequence Telangana has remained neglected, exploited, and backward. They allege that the experiment to remain as one state has proven to be a futile exercise and that separation is the best solution.

== Views of political parties between 2009 and 2013 ==
Most of the parties in the state changed their stance on Telangana statehood several times. Here are the stances taken by various parties in the state when the movement was at its peak between 2009 and 2013. The Congress Party, the ruling party at the centre, took its final decision to go ahead with creating the Telangana state in July 2013.

In parentheses (MP seats/MLA seats from Andhra Pradesh)

In Favor	Against	Neutral
Indian National Congress (31/155) ^{acg}	All India Majlis-e-Ittehadul Muslimeen^{f}(1/7)	YSR Congress^{b} (2/17)
Bharat Rashtra Samithi (2/17)	Communist Party of India (Marxist) (0/1)	Independents (0/2)
Bharatiya Janata Party (0/3)		Telugu Desam Party^{ae} (6/86)
Communist Party of India (1/4)		
Lok Satta^{ad} (0/1)		
Independent (0/1)		

(a) Parties which were in favor of Telangana state before 9 December 2009, but changed the stand to neutral on 10 December 2009, the day the process for formation of Telangana state was announced by central government and later retracted on 23 December.

(b) On 9 December 2009, Jagan Mohan Reddy as a Congress MP opposed the Telangana state formation. After he formed the YSR Congress party, it adopted a neutral stand.

(c) The Praja Rajyam Party of actor-politician Chiranjeevi was against the division of the state, but merged into the Congress in 2011.

(d) The Lok Satta adds that it will welcome the formation of a separate state as part of a comprehensive and amicable solution. It, however, states that the real issue is to improve the lives of people irrespective of the formation of a separate state.

(e) During the all party meeting on 28 December 2012, TDP representatives gave a letter signed by its president to Home minister of India which said that the party had never withdrawn its letter to Pranab Mukherjee in 2008 which supported Telangana state formation.

(f) MIM wants the state to remain united. If division is unavoidable, the party wants a separate state of Rayala-Telangana with Telangana and Rayalseema regions along with Hyderabad as capital. They oppose Hyderabad being declared as a union territory.

(g) The Congress Working Committee (CWC) unanimously passed a resolution on 30 July to create the State of Telangana.

== Early incidents (1969 to 1985) ==
1969 to 1973: This period was marked by two political namely 'Jai Telangana' and 'Jai Andhra' movements. Social tensions arose due to influx of people from the Coastal Andhra region. Protests started with the hunger strike of a student from Khammam district for the implementation of safe-guards promised during the creation of Andhra Pradesh. The movement slowly manifested into a demand for a separate Telangana.

Some students protested for "implementation of the safe guards from Andhra Pradesh" while some protested for a "Separate Telangana". The local newspaper Indian Express reported that the latter group were dominant. According to the 19 January 1969 edition of The Indian Express, the agitation turned violent when a crowd attempted to set fire to a sub-inspector's residence. 17 were injured in police firing. Discussions about the promised safe-guards were held. The Telangana Regional Committee was, however, not fully convinced of the outcome. This agitation was met by a counter agitation by the Andhra students accusing the transfer of Andhra employees as a discrimination between one region and the other. The transfers were eventually challenged in the high-court.

The army had to be called in. After several days of talks with leaders of both regions, on 12 April 1969, Prime minister put forth, an eight-point plan. Telangana leaders rejected the plan and protests continued under the leadership of newly formed political party Telangana Praja Samithi in 1969 asking for the formation of Telangana. Under the Mulki rules in force at the time, anyone who had lived in Hyderabad for 12 years was considered a local, and was thus eligible for certain government posts.

Telangana Praja Samithi was formed under the leadership of Ananthula Madan Mohan with the intention of leading the movement. The party however, split in November 1969 with the exit of dissident Congress leaders.

1971: In the May 1971 parliamentary elections, Telangana Praja Samithi won 10 out of the 14 Parliament seats in Telangana. Despite these electoral successes, some of the new party leaders gave up their agitation in September 1971 after realising that the Prime Minister was not inclined to towards a separate state of Telangana, and rejoined the safer political haven of the Congress ranks. Chief Minister Brahmananda Reddy resigns to make room for a Telangana Chief Minister. On 30-September-1971, P.V.Narasimha Rao – who would later become the Prime Minister of India – was appointed the Chief Minister of Andhra Pradesh. "The Telangana Praja Samithi was dissolved and its members rejoined the Congress."

1972: When the Supreme Court upheld the Mulki rules the Jai Andhra movement, with the aim of re-forming a separate state of Andhra, was started in Coastal Andhra and Rayalseema regions. The movement lasted for 110 days. The Supreme Court upheld the implementation of Mulki rules. The people from the Andhra region viewed the Mulki rules as "treating them like aliens in their own land".

1973: a political settlement was reached with the Government of India with a Six-Point Formula. It was agreed upon by the leaders of the two regions to prevent any recurrence of such agitations in the future. To avoid legal problems, constitution was amended (32nd amendment) to give the legal sanctity to the Six-point formula.

In 1985, when Telangana employees complained about the violations to six-point formula, a government order 610 (GO 610) was issued to correct the violations in recruitment. As Telangana people complained about the non-implementation of GO 610, in 2001, the government formed the Girglani commission to look into violations.

== 1997 to 2010 ==
In 1997, the state unit of the BJP passed a resolution seeking a separate Telangana. In 2000, Congress party MLAs from the Telangana region who supported a separate Telangana state formed the Telangana Congress Legislators Forum and submitted memorandum to their president Sonia Gandhi requesting to support the Telangana state.

A new party called Telangana Rashtra Samithi (TRS; Now Bharat Rashtra Samithi:BRS), led by Kalvakuntla Chandrashekar Rao (KCR), was formed in April 2001 with the single-point agenda of creating a separate Telangana state with Hyderabad as its capital.

In 2001, the Congress Working Committee sent a resolution to the NDA government for constituting a second SRC to look into the Telangana state demand. This was rejected by then union home minister L.K. Advani citing that smaller states were neither viable nor conducive to the integrity of the country.

In April 2002, Advani wrote a letter to MP A. Narendra rejecting a proposal to create Telangana state explaining that "regional disparities in economic development could be tackled through planning and efficient use of available resources". He said that the NDA government, therefore, does "not propose creation of a separate state of Telangana" However, in 2012, Advani said that if their then partner TDP cooperated during NDA tenure, a separate state of Telangana could have been created. This was confirmed by the President of the TDP, Chandrababu Naidu, on 1 September 2013 in a public meeting.

In the run-up to the 2004 Assembly and Parliament elections, then Union Home Minister L. K. Advani ruled out inclusion of Telangana in the NDA agenda and said "Unless there is consensus among all political parties in the state and unless that consensus is reflected in a resolution of the state Assembly, we don't propose to include it in the NDA agenda"

For these elections, the Congress party and the TRS forged an electoral alliance in the Telangana region to consider the demand of separate Telangana State. Congress came to power in the state and formed a coalition government at the centre; TRS joined the coalition after the common minimum program of the coalition government included that the demand for separate Telangana state will be considered after due consultations and consensus.

In February 2009 the state government declared that it had no objection, in principle, to the formation of separate Telangana and that the time had come to move forward decisively on this issue. To resolve related issues, the government constituted a joint house committee. In the lead-up to the 2009 General Elections in India, all the major parties in Andhra Pradesh supported the formation of Telangana.

In the 2009 elections TRS managed to win only 10 assembly seats out of the 45 it contested and only 2 MP seats. Some media analysts thought Telangana sentiment faded.

Within few months of getting re-elected as popular CM, Y. S. Rajasekhara Reddy (YSR) died in a helicopter crash in September 2009. This resulted in a leadership crisis within the Congress party and also created a political vacuum in the state. During this time, TRS president K. Chandrashekar Rao (KCR) raised his pitch for the separate state. On 29 November 2009, he started a fast-unto-death, demanding that the Congress party introduce a Telangana bill in Parliament. Student organisations, employee unions, and various organisations joined the movement. General strikes shut down Telangana on 6 and 7 December. In an all party meeting called by the state government on the night of 7 December to discuss regarding KCR's fast and how to handle it, all major Opposition parties extended their support for a separate state for Telangana. The state Congress and its ally Majlis-e-Ittehadul Muslimeen have left it to the Congress high command to take a final decision. Minutes of the meeting were faxed to Congress high command.

=== Announcement of bifurcation and subsequent rollback ===
On 9 December 2009, Union Minister of Home Affairs P. Chidambaram announced that the central government would start the process of forming a separate Telangana state, pending the introduction and passage of a separation resolution in the Andhra Pradesh assembly. Telangana Rashtra Samithi (TRS) Chief K Chandrasekhar Rao's failing health in the wake of his fast unto death was a major factor that led to the UPA government conceding the demand for carving out Telangana from Andhra Pradesh on 9 December, said former Union Minister Jairam Ramesh. This resulted in protests across both Andhra and Rayalseema. Students, workers, lawyers and various organisations in the regions launched the Samaikyandhra Movement demanding that the state be kept united. MLAs from these regions also submitted their resignations in protest seeking a reversal of the home minister's statement.

On 23 December, keeping in view the reactions of people of other regions, the Government of India announced that no action on Telangana will be taken until a consensus is reached by all parties and groups in the state. Coastal Andhra and Rayalaseema region MLAs started withdrawing their resignations while MLAs and ministers from Telangana started submitting their resignations, and demanded that the Centre take immediate steps to initiate the process of bifurcating Andhra Pradesh.

A Joint Action Committee (also known as JAC or TJAC) comprising political and non-political groups was formed to lead the demand for separate Telangana with Osmania University professor M Kodandaram as its convenor.

On 3 February, the government appointed a five-member committee headed by Justice SriKrishna to look into the issue.

== 2010: Srikrishna Committee ==
The Srikrishna Committee headed by former Chief Justice B. N. Srikrishna toured all the regions of state extensively and invited people from all sections of the society to give their opinion on the statehood. It received over one lakh petitions and representations from political parties, organisations, NGOs and individuals. It also held consultations with political parties and general public while also factoring in the impact of recent developments on different sections of people such as women, children, students, minorities, Other Backward Classes, Scheduled Castes and Scheduled Tribes.

On 16 December 2010, two weeks before the deadline for the submission of the Srikrishna report, TRS organised a public meeting in Warangal. It was estimated that over 2.6 million people attended this meeting. It was reported that even more would have attended, but were stranded due to traffic jams along roads leading to the city. TRS president K. Chandrasekhar Rao appealed to Prime Minister Manmohan Singh to note that the people of Telangana were losing patience. He demanded that the Centre introduce the Bill on Telangana in the next session of Parliament.

Days before the Srikrishna committee submitted its report to the Central government, KCR declared that his party was ready to wash Sonia Gandhi's feet if she agrees to the Telangana demand. He said his party is associated with the movement and was willing to dissolve the party if the state was formed.

=== Release of the report and summary of findings ===
The Indian Home Ministry released the 505-page Srikrishna Committee on 6 January 2011. The committee opined that most regions of Telangana (excluding Hyderabad) were either "on par or a shade lower" than Coastal Andhra. When Hyderabad is included, Telangana fared better. The most backward of all regions was in fact Rayalaseema. The committee, however, agreed with the violations of GO 610, which was issued by the former chief minister of the combined state of Andhrapradesh N.T.Rama Rao on 30 December 1985 following pressure from Telangana non-gazetted officers to repatriate non-locals who were recruited in Telangana in violation of the six-point formula, a positive discrimination policy of the government of India for the Telangana region, reached as a political settlement on 21 September 1973. Most violations, however, have been in the education and health sectors due to dearth of qualified locals. It also noted that the funds released for educational institutions in Telangana were lower than in the other two regions of the state. The committee did not see the Telangana movement as a threat to national integrity. Noting the emotions in the general public about the issue, a perceived neglect in implementation of assurances given to the region, it also said that "The continuing demand, therefore, for a separate Telangana, the Committee felt, has some merit and is not entirely unjustified". The conclusion of the report included the following statements "Therefore, after taking into account all the pros and cons, the Committee did not think it to be the most preferred, but the second best, option. Separation is recommended only in case it is unavoidable and if this decision can be reached amicably amongst all the three regions"

=== Solutions proposed ===
The report discusses six solutions to the problem, the preferred option being keeping the State united by simultaneously providing certain definite constitutional and statutory measures for socio-economic development and political empowerment of Telangana region through the creation of a statutorily empowered Telangana Regional Council. The second best option is bifurcation of the State into Telangana and Seemandhra as per existing boundaries, with Hyderabad as the capital of Telangana and Seemandhra to have a new capital.

=== Reactions to the report ===
The eighth chapter of the report was not made public for undisclosed reasons. After a judgement delivered by Justice L Narasimha Reddy of Andhra Pradesh High Court, the contents of the "secret" chapter were submitted to the High Court. The Chief Justice, in his 60-page judgement, said "The Committee travelled beyond the terms of reference in its endeavour to persuade the Union of India not to accede to the demand for Telangana". The judgement also quoted the SKC report's 8th chapter and said "The manoeuvre suggested by the Committee in its secret supplementary note poses an open challenge, if not threat, to the very system of democracy." The eighth chapter was not made public after division bench comprising the Chief Justice of the AP high court has stayed the order of Justice L Narasimha Reddy. Hence, the facts of the comments of the judge on the eighth chapter remain unverified.

== 2011 ==
=== Non-cooperation movement and Million March ===
On 17 February 2011, a noncooperation movement was started which lasted for 16 days with participation by 3,00,000 government employees. It caused a loss of Rs 8 billion per day in revenue to government. In February and March, Assembly session was boycotted for weeks and Parliament session was disrupted for several days by Telangana representatives.

Million March was organised by Telangana JAC in Hyderabad on 10 March 2011. Many seemandhra bound police were dropped into Hyderabad city to stop the Telangana movement. In a move to disrupt the march, seemandhra police arrested over thousand activists throughout the region and closed down entry to Hyderabad city by stopping certain transportation services and diverting traffic. Around 50,000 people reached the venue of the march, Tank Bund by hoodwinking police. Telangana activists damaged 16 statues of personalities representing Andhra culture and threw some of the remnants into the lake.

In November 2011, Telangana Rashtra Samiti Vidyarthi Vibhagam (TRSV) state president Balka Suman was arrested by Hyderabad police after cases were registered against him in connection with damaging statues on Tank Bund during the 'Million March,' attacking police personnel, damaging police and Seemandhra media vehicles.

=== Mass resignations ===
From April till June, the movement saw a lull, with different parties citing various reasons and fresh deadlines to renew the agitation. In July, 81 of 119 Telangana MLAs in the state, 12 out of 15 Telangana ministers in state, 13 out of 17 Telangana MPs in Lok Sabha, 1 Rajyasabha MP (Congress), 20 MLCs resigned protesting delay in the formation of Telangana. On 20 July 30-year-old Yadi Reddy was found dead 100 yards from Parliament House in Delhi. An eight-page suicide note says the young driver from greater Hyderabad region of Telangana was upset over the government not creating a new state for his homeland. The speaker of the AP assembly on 23 July summarily rejected the resignations of all 101 MLAs citing that they were made in an emotionally surcharged atmosphere. All Telangana MPs who earlier submitted their resignations and were boycotting the parliament session also decided to attend the parliament monsoon session citing Sonia Gandhi's ill health.

=== Sakala Janula Samme ===
On 12 September 2011, a day before Sakala Janula Samme (All people's strike), TRS organised a public meeting in Karimnagar which was attended by over a million people including TJAC leaders, BJP and New Democracy party leaders.

Starting 13 September, as part of 'strike by all section of people' supporting Telangana statehood, government employees throughout Telangana stayed out of work, lawyers boycotted courts and 60,000 coal miners of Singareni Collieries (SCCL Ltd.) also joined the strike. Soon government teachers, state road transport corporation employees and state electricity board employees joined the strike.

On a call given by JAC, road blockades on national highways throughout Telangana, rail blockade and the strike of auto rikshaw union were organised on 24 and 25 September causing disruption in transport services. Virtually all sections of people joined this strike. On 30 September, as the strike entered the 18th day, even while Congress central leadership met several Telangana congress leaders, JAC called a bundh in Hyderabad city. On 2 October, JAC leaders, employee unions leaders and TRS leaders including KCR met Prime minister to explain the situation in Telangana due to the strike and asked to expedite the decision on the statehood demand. The strike has resulted in an unprecedented power crisis in the state with only 223 MU of power generated against the demand of 275MU impacting both the industry and agriculture.

Due to Rail blockade call on 15 October 110 trains were cancelled and 68 trains were diverted by authorities. The railways operated 12 trains and Hyderabad metro trains with full police protection. Telangana protestors tried to have sit in on rail platforms or on railway tracks at various places. Police arrested thousands of protesters including 8 MPs and 4 MLAs. On 16 October public transport employees called off the strike. Within days other unions too called off the strike one after another. After 42 days, on 24 October, remaining employees unions called off the strike. M. Kodandaram said that the strike had impacted the overall thinking of the Centre towards creation of separate State and the movement will continue with other protest activities.

On 29 October 2011, three Congress party MLAs belonging to Telangana region resigned and joined TRS in protest as they were disappointed with Congress leadership's delay in Telangana state formation.

On 1 November, Congress MLA Komatireddy Venkat Reddy started an indefinite hunger strike until the central government announced a roadmap for Telangana state. 5 days later, the fast was broken when police arrested him under Section 309 of IPC (attempt to commit suicide) and shifted him to NIMS, Hyderabad where he was kept under intravenous fluids. He ended his fast on 9 November. 97-year-old freedom fighter Konda Laxman Bapuji also launched his week-long satyagraha at Jantar Mantar in New Delhi, demanding statehood to the region. at last the whole Telangana people participated in the movement.

== 2012 ==
In January, BJP led by State party president G. Kishan Reddy started the 22-day Telangana 'Poru Yatra', across 88 assembly constituencies stressing the need for Telangana state. Though the tour was successful in reiterating the party's pro-Telangana stance, it could not garner as much support as hoped because of the indifferent attitude of the TRS and TJAC. In fact the failure of the TRS in declaring its support to Kishan Reddy's yatra has resulted in growing differences between the two parties.

By-elections took place on 18 March in 6 Telangana assembly seats. TRS won four out of five seats it contested with huge majorities ranging from 15,024 to 44,465. In two out of the four seats won by TRS (Kamareddy and Adilabad), the TRS candidates polled fewer votes compared to 2009 assembly elections when they contested as candidates from TDP which was in alliance with TRS. Ex-TDP MLA Nagam Janardhan Reddy won from Nagarkurnool seat as an independent with TJAC support. Congress lost deposit in one constituency and TDP in 3 constituencies.

Bye-polls were conducted for 18 Assembly seats and 1 Parliament seat on 12 June. The YSRCP won 15 assembly seats and the lone Parliament seat in Seema-Andhra region. TRS's candidate managed to win the Parkal seat with a slender majority of 1562 votes over YSRCP candidate Konda Surekha. TDP finished third after polling 30,000 votes and retained its deposit. Both BJP and Congress lost their deposits.

In September 2012, Sushilkumar Shinde, the newly appointed Home minister of India commented that the Telangana demand needs to be handled carefully since similarly carved smaller states saw increased Naxal problems. Addressing a public meeting in Nizamabad district, AIMIM president Asaduddin Owaisi said that formation of a separate Telangana state is not possible and reaffirmed his party's stand on the issue. He also said that Muslims would not accept a separate state.

On 14 August 2012, KCR gave a deadline to the centre to declare statehood in 2 weeks and promised to launch another round of agitation if the centre doesn't. He later declared that he got feelers that a positive announcement will be made by Eid. In another interview after Eid, he remarked that Sonia Gandhi has always been in favour of Telangana and that the central government will call his party for discussions in "few weeks or so" On 6 September, KCR left for Delhi and announced that the issue will be resolved by end of September. After his 23-day stay in Delhi, KCR returned to Hyderabad hoping for a final round of talks with the Congress leadership on the issue. He claimed that his discussions with several leaders was fruitful.

=== Telangana March ===
After setting 30 September as the deadline for the Centre to announce the formation of Telangana, the TJAC threatened to organise a 'Telangana March' in Hyderabad on the lines of the 'Dandi March' . Anticipating violence and possibility of attack on properties of Andhraites, Police initially refused permission to the march which is scheduled around the time of Ganesh Nimmajjan on 29 September and UN conference on Bio diversity on 1 October. The Police begun checking buses and trains entering the city and students who are trying to enter the city to participate in the protest are being sent back. They identified troublemakers and arrested certain pro-Telangana activists throughout the Telangana region. Police said that there are intelligence reports that the protestors could attack properties of people of Seemandhra.

On 28 September, after long discussions between JAC leaders and ministers from Telangana region, the state government ignoring warnings about the possible breakdown of law and order, gave permission for the march. The JAC leaders gave written assurance to the government that the agitation programme would be conducted in a peaceful and "gandhian" manner from 15:00 to 19:00 on 30 September on the Necklace Road on the edge of Hussain Sager lake. Indian Railways cancelled several express and passenger trains and all local and sub-urban train services in Hyderabad reportedly on the advice of police.

On 30 September, the day of the march, Police closed the gates and blocked students at the Osmania University gate and other protestors at several places in the city when they were proceeding in rallies towards the March venue. Congress MPs from Telangana were arrested in front of Chief minister's office when they staged a dharna as they were not allowed to meet him over the detention of their party supporters who were stopped from reaching the venue.

Though police sealed all the entry points to the Necklace Road and opened only the Buddha Bhavan route, by 4pm around 2 lakh protestors including various party leaders and their supporters reached the venue from all routes. Coming under attack from both sides, the police ceded the entire Necklace Road to the protesters who marched on till Jal Vihar. According to the Police, the protesters torched two police vehicles at People's Plaza on the Necklace Road. The mobs also set afire three police vehicles, a couple of media outdoor broadcasting vans, machinery and a temporary cabin room of a construction company. The protesters made an attempt to set on fire a local train at Khairatabad station. At the railway's Hussainsagar junction cabin, around 1,000 Telangana supporters went on a rampage overpowering over 100 uniformed men stationed in the area and burnt down the cabin after manhandling railway staff. The entire signalling system was damaged and officials pegged the loss at around Rs. 60 lakh.

After 19:00, TJAC leaders violated the deadline and refused to leave the venue till the government issues a statement on Telangana. Police first used water cannons and later lobbed tear gas shells on the crowd and on to the stage to force the protestors to leave the venue. Finally at midnight the JAC called off the March citing heavy rain and injured supporters.

The next day, local police registered 15 cases against Kodandaram and others for conducting the march beyond the permitted time of 7 pm and till midnight and also for violence during the march. Railway police also registered cases against unidentified persons for damage to the signalling system at Lakdikapul. Cases were booked against the student leaders of TSJAC, OUJAC, Telangana Vidyarti Parishad and TVV. The bandh drew little response in Hyderabad and was partial in Telangana districts. Osmania University students again resorted to stone throwing and police retaliated by using tear gas shells.

On 27 December 2012 a meeting was organised by Home minister of India to discuss the Telangana issue. It was attended by 8 political parties having significant presence in the state legislature. After hearing views of all the parties, the home minister said that this will be the last such meeting on this issue and that the government will come up with a decision within 30 days. In the meeting, MIM and CPI (M) reiterated their strong opposition to division of the state. YSR Congress remained neutral and requested the central government to take a decision. Congress representatives gave conflicting views, one supporting the division and one opposing it. TDP representatives gave a letter signed by its president which said that it never withdrawn its letter to Pranab Mukharjee in 2008 supporting Telangana state formation. Telangana JAC demanded more clarity from Telugu Desam before they allow TDP to be a member of JAC.

== 2013 ==
2013 witnessed more protest by the TJAC including blockade of roads such as that of NH 7 in Mahbubnagar district. Public property was destroyed. This year also witnessed protest by five Congress MPs for 48 hours at the entrance of the Indian Parliament.

Leaders from various political parties joined TRS in support of the movement.

=== Chalo Assembly ===
In May 2013, chalo assembly the TJAC gave a call to lay siege to the state legislative Assembly in Hyderabad on 14 June 2013 to demand the formation of Telangana. Government refused permission to the march as they had information that anti-social elements might participate in the event and cause violence like in previous events of Sagara Haram and Million March where violence erupted despite promises made by the TJAC. Police made pre-emptive arrests of activists through the region which led to stalling of the assembly proceedings by opposition parties. The chief minister directed the Director-General of Police at a high-level review meeting not to use even rubber bullets in their efforts and observe utmost restraint in maintaining law and order. Amid fear of violence by Naxalites after an open letter claimed to have been written by them on the rally, police sounded a high alert across the state and almost sealed all the arterial roads leading to the Assembly. Over 25,000 policemen belonging to both central and state security forces were deployed. The TJAC leaders alleged that the government has been using repressive measures to prevent them from representing the aspirations of Telangana people in a peaceful manner. Educational institutions declared a holiday and public transport went off the roads and shops and establishments shut as a precautionary measure.

On the day of the event in spite of the restrictions placed, police could not totally prevent Telangana activists from sneaking into prime locations and making a vain bid to rush towards the Assembly. Hundreds of people including state legislators, the JAC Chairman and other leaders were arrested across the city. Osmania University campus witnessed pitched battles as police closed the campus gate to stop students leaving campus in a rally then resorted to tear gas shelling when student started stone pelting. After the march, the TJAC Chairman remarked that their goal to reach the Assembly complex and highlight their demand was fulfilled.

=== Congress Core Committee Meeting ===
According to an internal survey reportedly done for the state government (cited by media sources in June), the Congress party will get around 35-40 seats out of 294 MLA seats in the state, with TRS ahead in Telangana region while YSRCP in the Seema-Andhra region. This survey was reportedly being considered to arrive at a decision on the statehood issue.

On 30 June, Congress leaders belonging to Telangana region organised a public meeting in Hyderabad with a turn out of over 100,000 to show their support to Telangana state. It was attended by Damodar Raja Narasimha, Deputy Chief minister of the state, central ministers, state ministers, MPs and MLAs who expressed the confidence that their party leadership will create the separate state soon and said that Congress will perform well in the next elections in such a situation.

On 1 July, Congress party's in-charge of the state, Digvijay Singh said that party is at the final stages of taking decision on Telangana issue. He also directed state chief minister, deputy chief minister and state party president (they represent assembly constituencies in Rayalaseema, Telangana and Coastal Andhra regions respectively) to furnish a roadmap, keeping both options open, that could help lead to a decision. On 11 July the three leaders presented their views in the Congress core committee meeting, post which it was announced that a decision will be taken by the Congress Working Committee.

The Chief Minister Kiran Kumar Reddy met several MPs, MLAs and MLCs on 29 July in a bid to resolve the issue being taken up by the central Congress government.

=== CWC resolution on bifurcation ===
The Congress Working Committee (CWC) unanimously passed a resolution on 30 July to create the State of Telangana. The committee also assured that the concerns of people from the remaining regions regarding sharing of water and power resources will be addressed. The bifurcation decision sparked off fresh protests as part of the Samaikyandhra Movement.

==== Reactions ====
TRS welcomed the decision and its chief K. Chadrashekhar Rao said that his party is fine with Hyderabad being the joint capital. This was seen as an attempt by the INC to merge TRS into itself for the general and provincial election after being marginalised in the Rayalseema and coastal regions by the YSR Congress. and that their party supports the creation of Telangana and Vidarbha. They demanded that other requests for the creation of new states such as those of Gorkhaland and Bodoland need to be done by appointing a Second States Reorganisation Commission earlier too. We now demand that the government should set it up and seek a report within a specific timeframe.

Many parties and politicians including the Chief Minister-who hails from Rayalaseema- protested the bill. Some even termed it as "undemocratic". The congress and YSRCP were wiped out in the following elections, however in all three regions of the erstwhile Andhra Pradesh. 2014 Indian general election.

The decision sparked protests by the Gorkha Janmukti Morcha (GJM) in the form of an indefinite strike for Gorkhaland. GJM President Bimal Gurung also resigned from the Gorkhaland Territorial Administration in demand for Gorkhaland, citing West Bengal government's interference with its autonomy. It was even speculated by the media that more such moves could gain steam, such as that by the Bundelkhand Mukti Morcha for Bundelkhand. Meanwhile, the national Home Ministry opined that the lack of development in the proposed areas and the proximity to other hotbeds in Chattishgarh's Bastar and Maharashtra's Gadhidoli regions might cause an increase in Naxalism in Telangana Communist Party of India (Maoist) if the administration is not quickly consolidated.

The next steps towards the re-formation of Telangana, expected by early 2014, are: The national cabinet sharing its plans with the President of India and the Andhra Pradesh legislature. The Prime Minister would then organise a committee to negotiate a consensus between the leaders from the three regions for issues such as sharing revenue and water. Both national houses of parliament would then have to pass a resolution to create Telangana.

=== Cabinet approval of Telangana state ===
3 October 2013, the Union Cabinet approved the creation of the new State of Telangana. A Group of Ministers (GoM) was created to settle issues concerning the new state and the State of Andhra Pradesh. Hyderabad will be the shared capital for 10 years, after which it will belong to Telangana, said the Home Minister.

On 8 October, recently retired director general of police Dinesh Reddy said the Chief minister, Kiran Kumar Reddy pressured him to issue a public statement that the creation of Telangana would lead to intensification of Maoist activities. He also charged that the CM had reprimanded him for seeking additional central forces for containing expected trouble in Seemandhra in the run up to the Congress Working Committee's Telangana resolution at the end of July.

== Events leading to the formation of Telangana ==
=== Formation of Group of Ministers (GoM) ===
Govt of India set up the Group of Ministers (GOM) headed by union home minister Sushilkumar Shinde to address all the issues that need resolution at the central and state government levels during the formation of Telangana state. GOM met on 11 October for the first time released its terms of reference on 16 Oct. GOM met 2nd time on 19 October and considered the background notes which had been prepared by the Home Ministry regarding the various issues pertaining to the bifurcation. It also asked feedback from public to send their suggestions pertaining to the specific terms of reference before 5 November. On 29 October, the background notes prepared by Home ministry for GOM appeared in the media. On 30 October, Union Home Minister Sushil Kumar Shinde called for an all-party meeting, to be attended by representatives of national and regional parties of the state, to discuss the issues related to bifurcation. In a letter to 8 major political parties in the state, home ministry asked the parties to submit their suggestions to the GoM by 5 November, following which an all-party meeting will be held. On 13-14 November GOM met the representatives all parties of the state to discuss (TDP boycotted the meeting) about the issues related to bifurcation. GOM had meetings including some with CM, Deputy CM, cabinet ministers from the state and other state leaders while finalizing the Telangana draft bill.

On 3 December, Talk of including two Rayalaseema districts, Ananthapur district and Kurnool district, in Telangana state by GOM was criticised by pro-Telangana groups. TRS and JAC called for Telangana wide bandh (strike) on 5 December 2013 which had a good response.

On the evening of 5 December 2013, the cabinet approved the Telangana draft bill prepared by Group of Ministers (GoM). The bill have to approved by Parliament before it becomes 29th state of the union.

=== Legislative proceedings ===
6 December 2013: India's Union Home Ministry sends the Telangana draft bill to The President of India.

11 December 2013: The President of India reviews the bill and passes it on to the Andhra Pradesh State Assembly to elicit its views, giving it until 23 January to respond with its views. The bill was urgently hand-delivered the following day, to Assembly secretariat by the Joint Secretary of Union Home Ministry.

16 December 2013: The Telangana draft bill was introduced in Andhra Pradesh state assembly by deputy speaker Mallu Bhatti Vikramarka in the speaker's absence. This was met by protests and chaos created by the Seemandhra MLAs.

17 December 2013: Assembly's proceedings remain disrupted. The Business Advisory Committee (BAC) of the State Assembly decides to discuss the Bill starting the following day. This evokes mixed reactions including allegations on Seemandhra leaders' attempt to derail the bill by delaying the process.

18–19 December 2013: Assembly proceedings continue to be disrupted. The situation forces the speaker, Nadendla Manohar to adjourn the house until 3 January. This is met with protests from the Telangana MLAs. Telangana and Seemandhra leaders meet The President Pranab Mukherjee vying with each other to complain about the way the Telangana bill was being handled.

1 January 2014: 2 days before the start of the next assembly session, the Chief Minister Kiran kumar Reddy replaces D Sridhar Babu with S Sailajanath. This move comes criticised as the former hails from Telangana and the latter is actively involved with Samaikyandhra Movement. Sridhar Babu resigns from the cabinet in protest.

3–4 January 2014: Situation fails to improve as Assembly sessions remain disrupted.

6 January 2014: Unable to continue Assembly sessions amid chaos, the speaker requests members to submit written amendments, if any, to the clauses of the Bill by 10 January.

8 January 2014: The bill is finally taken up for debate. However, this lasts for only a few minutes with the YSR Congress Party MLAs resuming protests.

9 January: The debate continues only after YSRCP MLAs were suspended. While there was polarisation on regional lines, debate more or less turned into a blame game over the state bifurcation issue as every party indulged in a game of political one-upmanship. Congress leader from Seemandhra and minister Vatti Vasanth Kumar spoke opposing the Telangana bill and said bifurcation is against Seemandhra interests. On 10 January, debate started after YSRCP members staged walk out. Among others, TRS floor leader, E Rajender spoke in length supporting Telangana bill while highlighting the grievances of Telangana people and the history of the movement. CPI floor leader G Mallesh, Congress leader from Telangana and government chief whip Gandra Venkaramana Reddy spoke supporting Telangana bill. House was adjourned until 17 January. After 17 January, debate had less disruptions. Chief Minister requested the President four weeks of additional time for the debate a move opposed by Telangana leaders. On 23 January, President gave 7days extension, until 30 January, for assembly to give its views on Telangana draft bill.

23-25 January 2014: The Chief Minister presents his analysis on how the bifurcation is detrimental to both regions, the highlights being the effect on current irrigation projects in Telangana and better subsidised electricity given to farmers of Telangana. Telangana MLAs ridicule the Chief Minister and prevent the proceedings citing no opportunity to make a counter argument. The Chief Minister later expresses his opinion as the AP Reorganisation Bill-2013 being defective. Other members view this as an unduly delayed reaction.

27 January 2014: Chief Minister Kirankumar Reddy, gave notice to assembly speaker requesting to move resolution rejecting the Telangana bill. The move was criticised by Telangana MLAs including the ministers and deputy chief minister saying that cabinet was not consulted on the subject. They said this "amounts to defying the Union Cabinet, Constitution and President". After this, no debate was possible in the assembly as Telangana members insisted that speaker reject the Chief minister's notice.

On 30 January 2014, Andhra Pradesh assembly speaker declared that assembly completed the debate and all the members gave their views. He said, he would send to the President of India a compilation of 9,072 suggestions and amendments he received in writing from members, including 87 members who had spoken on the Bill in the house. Further he accepted the Chief minister's notice of resolution to reject the AP Reorganisation Bill and declared that resolution passed by voice vote without even waiting for the MLAs in the house to say 'aye', amidst pandemonium and protests from Telangana MLAs. Earlier in the day Seemandhra members rushed to the well of the House demanding that the resolution moved by the CM, without cabinet approval, be put to vote, those from the Telangana region, including the ministers and deputy chief minister, did the same with the demand that there should be no voting. At 11.30 pm, in what appears to be a coordinated strategy between the speaker, the chief minister and the Seemandhra legislators, all the members from that region converged at the well of the House and formed a wall around the speaker even as Manohar read out the resolution, put it to voice vote and declared it as having been passed. The bill will now be sent back to President Pranab Mukherjee after which it is slated to be tabled in Parliament. The resolution was placed in the house and was declared passed within 15 seconds. Analysts say "rejection of Telangana bill" is not valid and is useful only for political grand standing. Union cabinet minister Jaipal Reddy said that the resolution to reject the Telangana bill was passed in the assembly by cheating and it has no statutory and political sanctity. General secretary of Congress Party and party's in-charge for Andhra Pradesh, Digvijay Singh said that the bill that the President sent to the Assembly was never meant to be put to vote and said that the Congress high command and the Center would go ahead with its plans to introduce and pass the Telangana Bill in Parliament during the forthcoming session.

On 4 February, GOM cleared the Telangana bill after making few amendments to it based upon the input from state assembly.

On 7 February, Union cabinet cleared the Telangana bill and plans to introduce in upper house of Parliament with 32 amendments. Amendments include the details of financial package to Seemandhra to address their concerns.

On 13 February, Telangana bill was introduced in the Lok Sabha, the lower house of Parliament, by Union home minister, Sushilkumar Shinde despite protests, disruptions of Seemandhra MPs. In an unprecedented incidence, the use of pepper spray by Seemandhra MP, Lagadapati Rajagopal in the Lok Sabha during the introduction of the bill caused all the members to leave the house and some members to be hospitalised.

18 February 2014: the Telangana Bill is passed by the Lok Sabha with support from the Congress, BJP and other local parties. Broadcast of the proceedings enters a blackout during the voice vote. This caused widespread criticism of the manner in which the bill was passed.

20 February 2014: The Telangana bill is passed by Rajya Sabha with the support from the Congress, BJP and other local parties.

1 March 2014: The bill receives the assent of the President and published in the gazette.

4 March 2014: The Government of India declares 2 June 2014 as the Telangana Formation Day. Telangana is the 28th state of the Union of India with Hyderabad as its capital. Both states will share the capital for 10 years until Seemandhra can establish its own. However, the revenues of Hyderabad and state governing power will go only to Telangana. No special status was accorded to Seemandhra, though it was hinted in the Telangana Bill.

== In popular culture ==
Literature

- Battleground Telangana: Chronicle of an Agitation by Kingshuk Nag.
- Telangana: The State of Affairs by M. Bharath Bhushan and N. Venugopal.
- Old History, New Geography : Bifurcating Andhra Pradesh by Jairam Ramesh

Film

- Jai Bolo Telangana (2011). It won Nandi awards for Best Director, Lyricist, National Integration, Male Playback Singer, Male Dubbing Artist.
- Inkennallu (2011). It won Nandi award for Best Supporting actress.

== See also ==
- Samaikyandhra Movement
- Vishalandhra Movement
- Jai Andhra movement
- Disputes between Andhra Pradesh and Telangana
