= Samaikyandhra movement =

Political movement opposing the bifurcation of Andhra Pradesh, India

Samaikya Andhra Movement (United Andhra Movement) was a movement organized to keep the Indian state of Andhra Pradesh united, and to prevent the division of the state - separating the Telangana districts of the state into a separate Telangana state. The movement was supported by government employees, advocates in Coastal Andhra and Rayalaseema regions along with students from 14 universities, various occupational, caste and religious groups of Coastal Andhra and Rayalaseema regions. The last set of protests were triggered after the Congress Working Committee decision to divide the state came to an end after President of India gave nod to Telangana Bill which would make the latter to come into existence from 2 June 2014.

Andhra Pradesh with 23 districts

== Background ==
The movement took shape on 9 December 2009, when as a result of an 11-day fast by Telangana Rashtra Samithi (TRS) president K Chandrashekar Rao (KCR), Union Home Minister P. Chidambaram announced that the Indian government would start the process of forming a separate Telangana state pending the introduction and passage of a separation resolution in the Andhra Pradesh assembly. The announcement resulted in widespread protests across Coastal Andhra and Rayalseema regions.

Lagadapati Rajagopal began an hunger strike demanding that the state be kept united, his shocking dramatic "escape" from the hospital in Vijayawada to the State capital, he said he had come to the Nizam's Institute of Medical Sciences (NIMS). He called off his fake deeksha in the presence of reporters and immediately afterwards, said he would undertake another fast-untodeath in Visakhapatnam if the Centre didn't come out with a solution acceptable to all. though his strike didn't receive much support. Leaders and activists of Seemandhra political parties and several elected representatives and leaders of the Congress went on one day hunger strikes extending their support to the cause.

Students, workers, lawyers & various organizations in the regions launched agitations and peaceful demonstrations (dharnas) demanding that the state be kept united. MPs from these regions also submitted their resignations in protest seeking a reversal of the home minister's statement. Two activists also allegedly committed suicide in protest against the division of the state.

TDP leaders including MLAs Devineni Uma and Paritala Sunitha, who were on a fast-unto-death as an act of protest in Vijayawada, Ananthapur, Guntur, Ongole etc. were arrested and forcibly shifted by the police to hospitals. In Kadapa, Y. S. Rajasekhara Reddy (YSR)'s brother and Member of Legislative Council (MLC) Y. S. Vivekananda Reddy also fasted in support of united Andhra accompanied by his wife and followers who sat on a relay hunger strike. Another Congress leader who was fasting was also forcibly taken to hospital.

At Sri Venkateswara University, actor Mohan Babu sat on a day-long fast in the campus expressing solidarity with the students who were already on a hunger strike.

On 23 December, keeping in view the reactions of people of other regions, the Government of India announced that no action on Telangana will be taken until a consensus is reached by all parties and groups in the state. Samaikyandhra movement proponents continued the movement demanding a clear stand from the central government that the state will remain united and will not be divided. On 3 February 2010, the government announced a five-member committee headed by former Supreme Court judge Justice Srikrishna to look into the issue. It also announced Terms of Reference to the Srikrishna Committee, with a deadline of 31 December 2010 to submit its report.

== Concerns of Protestors ==
=== Historical ===
Proponents of the cause call the very coining of two words (Telanganites and Andhrites) to describe the Telugu speaking people who live between the Krishna and Godavari river as the result of an emotionally painful loss of wars to foreign kingdoms and a reminder of the destruction of a glorious era in Telugu history. The fall of the unified Telugu kingdoms of Krishna Deva Raya to the Bahminis, the fall of Mussunuri kingdom to the Turks and the Vijaya Rama Kingdom to the British are seen as historical failures of the Telugu people.

=== Hyderabad ===
Capital: Since the state of Andhra Pradesh loses Hyderabad if Telangana gets divided, the people of the former region expressed concerns over the lack of a proper capital to their state.

Revenue: Proponents of the Samaikyandhra Movement argue that a division of the state will be detrimental to the other regions as majority of the state's revenue comes from the capital Hyderabad and the proper development and implementation of welfare programs in the Andhra Pradesh state would not be possible along with the establishment of a new capital.

Employment & Education: Students feel that in case of a division, youth of the Coastal Andhra and Rayalaseema will be denied many education and employment opportunities, especially from Hyderabad. Medical students also fear that since 85 per cent of super specialty course seats were allotted to colleges in Telangana, students from other regions may not be able to pursue important PG courses like cardiology.

Water: Division of the state, they argue, would also result in water problems in Coastal Andhra and Rayalaseema since Telangana is on the upstream of Krishna and Godavari rivers. Farmers & water-users associations express fear that division of the state would render upland areas in Krishna delta into a desert and force farmers to migrate as daily wage earners. According to water experts, the Polavaram Project could take up to 15 years for completion and due to the state division its reservoir would be located in Telangana region which could further intensify the already existing interstate disputes over the project.

Safety and Security in Hyderabad: People in Coastal Andhra and Rayalaseema regions express worries about the safety of their friends and relatives who have settled in the state capital, Hyderabad and the fear that they would be considered 'non-locals' in their own state. They also said that they are not ready to lose Hyderabad since they opined, they had contributed more for the development of Hyderabad.

== Sri Krishna Committee Report ==
The five member committee headed by Justice B.N. Sri Krishna toured all the regions of state extensively and invited people from all sections of the society to give their opinion on the statehood. It received over one lakh petitions and representations from political parties, organisations, NGOs and individuals. It also held consultations with political parties and general public while also factoring in the impact of recent developments on different sections of people such as women, children, students, minorities, Other Backward Classes, Scheduled Castes and Scheduled Tribes. In a report submitted to the Home Ministry of India on 30 December 2010, the committee opted to keep the State united and favored for bifurcation of Andhra Pradesh.

Samaikhyandhra proponents were against the report and recommended option. Telangana leaders accepted the recommendations of the Sri Krishna Committee Report and insisted on the formation of a separate Telangana State with Hyderabad as its capital.

== Protests in 2010 ==
In January, in Krishna District activists stopped trains at various railway stations and resorted to road blockades at some places. As many as 46 trains were "detained" for duration ranging between 2 minutes and 45 minutes at various stations in the Vijayawada division of the South Central Railway. However, no damage to railway properties was reported. MLAs from Congress & TDP participated in the agitation. A government teacher in Tirupati reportedly committed suicide for the cause of the united state leaving a note behind which mentioned that he was saddened by the bandhs strikes and other endeavors being undertaken to split the state.

In February, the Samaikyandhra Medical Joint Action Committee in its inaugural session at Tirupati accused P. Chidambaram of ‘conspiring’ to weaken Andhra Pradesh by allegedly encouraging bifurcation of the unified State into 2 separate states. They said that his stand against bifurcation of Tamil Nadu & Andhra Pradesh shows his double standards and his ‘conspiracy’ as a Tamil Nadu politician to weaken Andhra Pradesh by breaking the State into two and thereby put deliberate brakes on its fast-track development recorded especially during the last 15 years.

In September, members of the Samaikyandhra All Universities JAC blocked the State Highway in Visakhapatnam district in protest against the allegations made by a student from Warangal that he was beaten up by some locals after he joined at a B.Ed. college here. The student had not attended classes but made the false allegation and also went on a fast in Warangal to which the TRS MLAs extended support, the JAC said.

In November, on the eve of the state formation day on 1 November, the students JAC warned separatist forces against continuing to ignite passions of people. A statue of Potti Sriramulu in Tirupati was flooded with garlands as parties and movements of all hues converged to express their strong sentiments advocating the cause of unified Andhra Pradesh.

== Protests in 2011 ==
In February, Students in Ongole, under the banner of Samaikya Andhra Rashtra Vidyardhi Joint Action Committee (SARVJAC), protested against the film Jai Bolo Telangana by viewing the film with flowers in their ears. The film portrayed the Telangana history and the agitation for statehood. The SARVJAC members took exception to the film's content and scenes, and described it as an attempt to hoodwink the people. They warned the director not to make film that fan regional passions. They also said that actor Jagapathi Babu would not be allowed to enter Seemandhra if he continued to act in such films.

In March, Leaders of Samaikyandhra Parirakshana Samithi performed 'palabhishekam,' at the statue of Gurram Jashua in Nagarampalam and at the statue of Annamaya protesting against the desecration of statues of eminent Telugu personalities by pro-Telangana forces at Tank Bund during the Million March. In Vijayawada, a rally was taken out by the activists of Jana Vignana Vedika along with members of other cultural and literary organisations. They carried the pictures of eminent litterateurs Sri Sri, Tripuraneni Ramaswamy Chowdary, Annamayya and Kuchipudi exponent Siddhendra Yogi and decried the desecration of their statues, saying they did not belong to any one region or group. Media persons with the banner of AP Union of Working Journalists (Krishna urban unit) took out another rally and staged a dharna at sub-collector's office. Decrying the attacks on media persons and damaging of equipment belonging to various media houses, the journalists said the leadership of Telangana movement must accept responsibility for the incidents.

In July, hundreds of women activists of the Women Joint Action Committee today took out a rally in Kadapa in favour of United State Samaikyandhra and raised slogans in support of a united state.

In October, reacting to the Sakala Janula Samme carried out by the Telangana JAC, congress MLAs pointed out that while the richer sections were not affected, those in the bottom half of the economic strata were the worst-affected. The I-Max theatres and Telangana-based institutions continued their operations while others are made to suffer heavily, they deplored.

On 21 October, a seminar was organised by the Rayalaseema Hakkula Ikya Vedika in Kurnool which was attended by Vedika president T G Venkatesh, 24 MLAs and 4 MLCs from the Congress, TDP and YSR Congress Party. The leaders passed a resolution asking the Centre to keep Andhra Pradesh integrated and warned of serious consequences if the Centre decides in favour of the formation of Telangana. The speakers said that the people of Rayalaseema have made several sacrifices for the formation of Andhra Pradesh, and that they had even compromised on the state capital being shifted to Hyderabad from Kurnool.

On 1 November, the formation day of the state of Andhra Pradesh, Samaikyandhra protagonists in Vijayawada reiterated their commitment to keep the State united by paying floral tributes to Potti Sriramulu, whose life sacrifice led to formation of Andhra state from Tamil Nadu in 1953 and later formed as Andhra Pradesh in 1956 on linguistic basis. At a meeting organised by the SARVJAC, representatives of State government employees, teachers and lawyers vowed to make any sacrifice to prevent any move to divide the state. Cultural programmes were organised to highlight the rich cultural heritage of Telugu people on the occasion.

== Protests in 2012 ==
In August, the Student JAC warned that it will revive the agitation if the Centre does not come out with a strong message on keeping the State united. At a meeting held on the premises of Acharya Nagarjuna University attended by representatives from 14 universities in Coastal and Rayalaseema regions the activists demanded that the Centre make its stand clear on the Telangana issue and clear the uncertainty in the State.

From 18 Octobter 2012 till 4 August 2013 Y. S. Sharmila toured 14 districts to drive home her point that Andhra Pradesh was one single unit and should not be partitioned.

On 9 December, the anniversary of the Union government's statement in 2009, the Samaikya Andhra Rashtra Vidyarthi Joint Action Committee (Sarvjac) organized protests against moves to grant statehood to Telangana and remembered the day as Vidroha Dinam (betrayal day).

On 28 December, leaders of the Samaikyandhra Parirakshna Samithi met in Vijayawada and warned of serious problems if a separate Telangana state was formed. They also expressed anger at Telangana leaders for their alleged inciting statements. Some educational institutions in Guntur remained closed today in response to the bandh call given by the Samaikyandhra student JAC and demonstrations were held.

== Protests in 2013 ==
In the run-up to the one-month deadline, when the home minister was to announce a decision on the division of state, several political leaders and organizations met him to demand that the state be kept united.

On 10 January, Students led by Samaikyandhra Joint Action Committee picketed in front of Guntur MP Rayapati Sambasiva Rao's house urging him to take a strong stand for a united state.

On 18 January, leaders of the Samaikyandra students JAC were arrested near Public Gardens in Hyderabad when they tried to hold a meeting at the venue. Samaikyandhra JAC leaders also raided houses of MLAs in the Coastal Andhra & Rayalaseema regions demanding them to resign and prevail on the central government to keep the state united. Students under the banner of the Samaikyandhra Vidyarthi Joint Action Committee (SVJAC) held rallies urging the Centre to come out with a clear-cut announcement for keeping the State united. Any delay, according to them, was affecting the development in the State and the future of youth and others sections of rayalaseema and coastal area people.

On 22 January, 4,673 active advocates practising in the 38 courts across Visakhapatnam district abstained from work as per the call given by the bar association took out a protest rally carrying placards asking the Central government to maintain status quo in the state.

On 25 January, Students and teachers of unaided schools and colleges took out rallies in Kadapa and Anantapur demanding a categorical announcement from the central government that the state will not be bifurcated. They also laid siege to Hindupur MP Nimmala Kistappa and demanded his resignation. Advocates staged protested at Kurnool and Anantapur by boycotting courts. Members of Kurnool Bar Association and Anantapur Bar Associations took out rallies in protest against proposals of separate Telangana state.

In Rajahmundry, a meeting organised by local Congress MP Vundavalli Aruna Kumar and attended by 11 ministers resolved to urge the Union Government not to bifurcate the state. Vundavalli remarked that "The youngsters who died during Telangana agitation are also our children and we are not interested to see their sacrifices. We don't allow KCR to continue his cheap gimmicks for political mileage". He said that the TRS should stop whipping up regional passions in the name of a movement.

On 27 January, activists of the Samaikyandhra JAC gheraoed the state Minister for Minor Irrigation T G Venkatesh, in Anantapur demanding that he resign in support of the Samaikyandhra movement. He said that the Union Government as well as the Congress government in the State were committed towards formation of a second SRC as was mentioned in the Congress manifesto.

In June 2013, Samaikyandhra JAC activists protesting BJP's stand on the state division issue were attacked by BJP activists, when they tried to enter a meeting at the townhall in Nellore.

Union Tourism Minister Chiranjeevi, whose previous party Praja Rajyam supported the united state stand before its merger with Congress, reiterated that personally he was still in favour of the untied state but will abide by whatever the Congress high command decides.

=== Congress Core Committee Meeting ===
On 1 July, Congress party's in-charge of the state, Digvijay Singh said that party is at the final stages of taking decision on Telangana issue. He also directed state chief minister, deputy chief minister and state party president (they represent assembly constituencies in Rayalaseema, Telangana and Coastal Andhra regions respectively) to furnish a roadmap, keeping both options open, that could help lead to a decision.

Amidst reports of the central government reportedly moving towards a decision on the Telangana issue, 4 MLAs & 2 MLCs belonging to the Congress, YSR Congress Party (YSRCP) & TDP tendered token resignations to protest against division of the state. SVJAC activists also submitted a representation to Digvijaya Singh not to divide the State after several committees set up had not decided against creation of Telangana. They expressed apprehension that Rayalaseema and Coastal areas would face water and power problems and would slip into backwardness with lands turning into desert. Small states would also lead to problems of Naxalism, JAC State convener D.V. Krishna Yadav and others said in a statement.

In a meeting on 5 July in Anantapur, Samaikyandhra JAC decided to hold a large number of meetings in various districts to exert pressure against dividing the state. A large number of activists from the Samaikyandhra JAC took out a rally at Dharmavaram in Anantapur district. In a related development, Union minister of state for Railways Kotla Jayasurya Prakasha Reddy met Digvijay Singh and represented to him that state should be kept united.

In Visakhapatnam, activists of the Samaikya Andhra Porata Samithi (SAPS) staged a protest and appealed to MP Purandeswari by sending her an Ashada Masa gift of turmeric, kumkum, bananas, sweetmeats and a saree (usually presented by brothers to married sisters during Ashada Masam) through parcel services. They also sent a Kamandala and Vibhoodhi (holy ash) to T. Subbarami Reddy, indirectly urging him to take up the issue seriously or be prepared for political exile. The activists also threatened to lay siege on their houses in Vizag, if they failed to respond positively to their cause for a united Andhra. SAPS state president GA Narayana Rao alleged that the two leaders were neither lobbying for united Andhra in Delhi with the Congress high command nor were they meeting with Seemandhra leaders to express their support to the cause. A group of activists also burnt an effigy of the state government at Andhra University even as another group of activists conducted a meeting of intellectuals supporting the united Andhra cause. While at the intellectuals meet held at the public library, a majority of speakers opposed the government's attitude toward bifurcation, they said they would not accept a division of the state.

In Vijayawada, a meeting was organized under the leadership of Lagadapati Rajagopal which was attended by Union minister J D Seelam who asserted their stand in keeping the state united.

In Guntur, Students JAC called for educational institutions bandh to protest the arrest of JAC leaders during the visit of Union minister Kavuri Sambasiva Rao. Another MP, Rayapati launched a signature campaign organized by the Acharya Nagarjuna University students. A large number of students from local colleges participated in the signature campaign and warned that they would not hesitate to sacrifice their lives if the state was split into two.

In Ongole, Student activists laid a siege to the house of Congress MLA B.N.Vijaykumar demanding his resignation for the cause of united Andhra Pradesh. Ahead of the 12 July meeting of Congress core committee, which is expected to discuss the vexed Telangana state formation issue, the students insisted that the legislator put in his papers to put pressure on the Centre to avert the division of the state at any cost.

In Srikakulam, activists conducted rallies and formed human chains in the district asking the Congress not to take any decision in favour of Telangana State formation saying that it would affect the interests of backward areas such as Srikakulam. Agitators staged a protest in front of the house of Union Minister of State for Communications and Technology Killi Krupa Rani at Tekkali asking her to make a statement in favour of United Andhra Pradesh.

In Tirupati, students of various educational institutes took out a massive rally and formed a human chain at the busy town club circle while advocates decided to boycott their duties. In a meeting jointly convened by SAPS and Sri Venkateswara University Teachers Association (SVUTA) intellectuals strongly opposed the state bifurcation saying that they have already sacrificed two state capital cities Chennai and Kurnool during the formation of Andhra State and Andhra Pradesh State respectively and that they are not ready to sacrifice another capital city Hyderabad.

In Delhi, activist peacefully stood outside Digvijaya Singh's residence with posters carrying message of unity is strength and many like that.

On 11 July the state chief minister, deputy chief minister and state party president presented their views in the Congress core committee meeting, post which it was announced that a decision will be taken by the Congress Working Committee.

== 2013 ==
=== CWC Resolution on Telangana ===
On 30 July, Indian National Congress party working committee unanimously passed a party resolution for the creation of a Telangana state. It was formally announced that the party would request the Central government to take steps in accordance with the Constitution of India to form a separate state of Telangana within a definite time frame. Andhra Pradesh and the newly formed Telangana state would share the current capital city Hyderabad as the common capital city for a period of 10 years. The Indian National Congress party also announced that all the concerns of people from remaining regions regarding sharing of water & power resources will be addressed. TRS welcomed the decision and said that their party is fine with Hyderabad being the joint capital.

2013 United Andhra Movement
- Part of Samaikyandhra Movement
- Date: 30 July 2013 – 20 February 2014
- Location: 13 districts of Coastal Andhra & Rayalaseema
- Caused by: Oppose the decision of Congress Working Committee to divide the state of Andhra Pradesh
- Goals: Stop division of Andhra Pradesh; Hyderabad for all
- Methods: Strike action, Procession, One Lakh Voices protests, Bandh, Raasta roko, Gherao, Hartal, Human Chain, Suicide and other unique and innovative forms of protests
- Status: Ended

Casualties
- Arrested: 221

=== Public Protests Aftermath ===
The decision to create a separate state triggered protests across the Coastal Andhra & Rayalaseema regions and by several government employee unions in Hyderabad. There were bandhs, blocking highways and roads, sporadic protests by students JAC, the NGOs (the non-gazetted government employees) and other sections of the public. Protesters raised slogans expressing their ire at the Congress president Sonia Gandhi and burnt effigies of Sonia Gandhi and KCR. In Vizianagaram, a home guard committed suicide in protest against the decision and another death, of a student, was reported from Guntur over the same issue. APSRTC employees union, AP Government Doctors Association, Lawyers condemned bifurcation of the State and went round the court premises holding banners demanding that the Government keep the State unified.

All commercial activity came to a standstill and educational institutions were closed. APSRTC buses were confined to depots with employees to joining the protests. MIM activists of Anantapur also staged a protest against the decision to split the state.

All private business establishments, banks, government offices, hotels remained closed. Seemandhra employees in the Secretariat boycotted their duties took out a rally's.

The protests also included exclusive demonstrations by advocates, teachers, students, automobile mechanics, bus and lorry owners, drivers, tailors, barbers, butchers, goldsmiths, carpenters and merchants in different parts of the region.

The protesters raised slogans like for 'United Andhra Pradesh'. A youth committed suicide in Chittoor district after shouting slogans in favour of 'Samaikyandhra Pradesh'. An unemployed engineering graduate committed suicide by consuming pesticide and held TRS president K. Chandrasekhar Rao and Union Ministers P. Chidambaram, Sushil Kumar Shinde and Digvijay Singh responsible for the State's split.

Normal life was paralysed in 13 districts across Coastal Andhra & Rayalseema regions with public transport remaining off the road and over four lakh government employees going on an indefinite strike in protest against the move to bifurcate Andhra Pradesh. Petrol bunks, educational institutions, cinema halls, shops and establishments were closed at most places even as various forms of protests, including hunger strike, rallies were organised.

On 5 September, in Nellore, Laksha Gala Ghosha under the banner of Samaikyandhra Simha Garjana was held at the A.C. Subba Reddy sports stadium which was attended by over 1.25 lakh people.

Save Andhra Pradesh Meeting in Hyderabad

On 7 September, In Hyderabad, Government employees asserted that they would settle for nothing less than undivided Andhra Pradesh at their impressive public meeting Save Andhra Pradesh, organised by the AP Non-Gazetted Officers' Association at LB Stadium amid heightened tension on account of the Telangana bandh call, sporadic attacks and heavy police restrictions. All the galleries and the ground were packed with employees from various departments. During the meeting, the APNGOs president said the people of Seemandhra were not ready to accept division or give up Hyderabad as their livelihood is linked to the city. He said that Indira Gandhi ordered for United Andhra Pradesh but the Congress decided to carve out separate Telangana state with Hyderabad as its capital. the APNGOs, strongly objected to the restrictions imposed by the police on live coverage of the meeting. He reminded that they have conducted the meeting with the permission of the police and the High Court. He questioned as to how far it was justifiable to impose restrictions on live coverage of the meeting of APNGOs. It was undemocratic to muzzle the voice of media, he said. He cautioned that they would further intensify their agitation, if the Telangana Bill was introduced in Parliament, not considering the sentiments of Seemandhra people. He also revealed a plan to conduct a million march in Parade Grounds in Hyderabad.

The bandh call by Telangana JAC came after the city police gave permission to the pro-united AP state government employees to organise a public meeting but denied the same to pro-Telangana groups.

Scores of pro-Telangana supporters gathered clandestinely in the Nizam College hostel building adjacent to the LB Stadium and hurled stones at employees from Seemandhra, who were making way into the stadium. Police, who entered the hostel building to disperse the violent mob, were also greeted with stones. However, police in riot gear took several 'outsiders' into custody and whisked them away from the hostel building. An Armed Reserve police constable was allegedly beaten up by policemen and Samikyandhra employees inside the venue for voicing Jai Telangana slogans.

An Armed Reserve police constable was beaten up by policemen and Samikyandhra employees at the 'Save Andhra Pradesh' public meeting at LB Stadium for raising Jai Telangana slogan.

On 29 September 2013, a seven-hour-long meeting to 'Save Andhra Pradesh,' held in Kurnool saw an attendance of around 100,000 people.

=== Reactions by Political Parties ===
On 1 August, One minister and 18 legislators from the Congress Party in Coastal Andhra and Rayalaseema regions resigned over the bifurcation of Andhra Pradesh.

On 5 August, MPs belonging to both Congress and TDP created uproar in both Lok Sabha & Rajya Sabha demanding a clear statement from the government to keep the state united.

On 10 August, president of the YSR Congress Y.S. Jagan Mohan Reddy and his mother, YSR Congress Legislature Party leader Y.S. Vijayalakshmi resigned from their memberships of the Lok Sabha and Assembly respectively to protest the Congress' unilateral decision to go ahead with the creation of Telangana state without addressing the concerns of other regions of the state.

On 12 August, two state ministers resigned from their posts protesting the proposed bifurcation of the state.

On 13 August, Members of the Congress party, including Cabinet Ministers, MPs & MLAs held a protest and raised slogans in the Parliament premises demanding a united Andhra Pradesh. TDP MP Naramalli Sivaprasad created uproar in the Lok Sabha by dressing up as Lord Krishna and trooping into the well of the House to protest.

On 15 August, a delegation of eight union ministers met the high-level panel headed by Defence Minister A. K. Antony, which was appointed to look into the concerns of people from Coastal Andhra & Rayalaseema regions after the proposed division. The ministers told the panel about the problems like sharing of water and power resources, security to employees and other issues that would arise once the State was divided. They also demanded the appointment of a 2nd States Reorganisation Commission to look into the creation of a Telangana state.

On 16 August, wife of state minister Thota narasimham was forcibly shifted to a hospital after 6 days of indefinite fast in Kakinada.

On 19 August, YSR Congress Party honorary president Y.S. Vijayalakshmi began her indefinite fast against the proposed division.

On 20 August, two MLAs from Nellore district started an indefinite hunger strike against the division proposal. In Kadapa, YSRCP leaders Gadikota Srikanth Reddy and Pochimareddy Ravindranath Reddy ended their fast after 9 days when they were forcibly shifted to a hospital.

On 21 August, CM Kiran Kumar Reddy met the Anthony committee and argued that bifurcation would harm the interests of the two States and also pointed out that the Congress party will face problems electorally. Over a dozen state ministers also met the committee and listed a number of issues such as river water sharing, employment, economic development, agriculture, HRD that needed to be addressed before the Centre goes ahead with the division.

On 22 August, TDP MP in Rajya Sabha Nandamuri Harikrishna submitted his resignation which was accepted on the same day. In Guntur & Nellore, TDP MLAs who were on an indefinite fast were forcibly shifted to hospitals. Another MLA launched a padayatra from Chittoor to Tirumala. In Lok Sabha, the government brought a suspend motion on 11 MPs belonging to TDP & Congress for protesting the Telangana decision. However, members of opposition including Trinamool Congress and BJP protested the motion.

On 23 August, 8 Congress and 4 MPs were suspended for continuously stalling the Lok Sabha proceedings.

On 2 October, several BJP leaders from Coastal Andhra & Rayalaseema regions met their party's central leadership including L K Advani, Rajnath Singh and sought their intervention to impress upon the Centre to address concerns of the people due to the state division. The BJP later issued a statement that their party was committed for the state division but will ensure that everyone's concerns will be addressed and no injustice will be done to any region.

== Protests in 2014 ==
APNGOs Association have called for bandh (general strike) in seemandhra on 13 February 2014 in protesting against the introduction of Telangana Bill in parliament. The general strike has crippled normal life in the Rayalaseema and Coastal regions of Andhra Pradesh

== AP Reorganization Bill in Parliament ==
The Andhra Pradesh Reorganization Bill, 2013 was introduced by the speaker Meira Kumar at 12:00PM on 13 February 2014. During this time there was a lot of shouting slogans in the parliament and MP Lagadapati Rajagopal sprayed pepper spray at the speaker and all around in the parliament. He was then tackled by some Congress MPs from other states. Another MP Modugula Venugopala Reddy pulled out a mic and moved menacingly towards the MPs who were trying to stop L Rajagopal. The parliament was then adjourned at 12:05PM to 02:00PM. But later, it was officially announced that the Andhra Pradesh Reorganization Bill, 2013 was passed. Leader of the opposition in Lok Sabha Sushma Swaraj said she does not know if the bill was introduced and denies to acknowledge that it was introduced.

== Petitions in Supreme Court ==
Nine petitions were filed in supreme court requesting for a stay of Andhra Pradesh Reorganization Bill, 2013 tabling in parliament. The supreme court later rejected the pleas saying, "We do not think this is the appropriate stage for us to interfere". And said they would take them up later.

== Support in Telangana ==
AIMIM party which represents a few assembly segments in Hyderabad City has committed towards keeping the state united. Also, Sangareddy MLA Jagga Reddy has come in support of keeping the state united.

In 2010, Chiranjeevi and Jagan Mohan Reddy who had openly supported this movement had faced trouble attending some public events in Telangana region.

In light of the ongoing violent agitations and political gridlock, some politicians have suggested to include Nalgonda district in to Seemandhra instead of Kurnool district. This could resolve the issue of Hyderabad as a permanent common capital. This proposal means Hyderabad can be a border city of Telangana and seemandhra. Many Telangana leaders have opposed this plan.

== Support from NRIs ==
This movement has also received support from a section of seemandhra NRIs settled abroad with AndhraPradeshNRI.org, a non-profit organization created to provide a platform to reflect the views of seemandhra NRIs of Andhra Pradesh origin, organizing several events across the US to celebrate the AP formation day in November 2010. No politician from Telangana attended these events. A group of Telangana NRIs protested at the events organized by Samaikya Andhra proponents.

Telugu people in Canada cutting across regional lines criticized the Indian government for not dealing with "blackmail" politics to thwart creation of Telangana out of Andhra Pradesh and have come out in favour of the division of the state.

== See also ==
- Telangana Movement
- Vishalandhra Movement
- Jai Andhra Movement
