= 2012 Hyderabad Biodiversity Conference =

United Nations Biodiversity Conference COP11
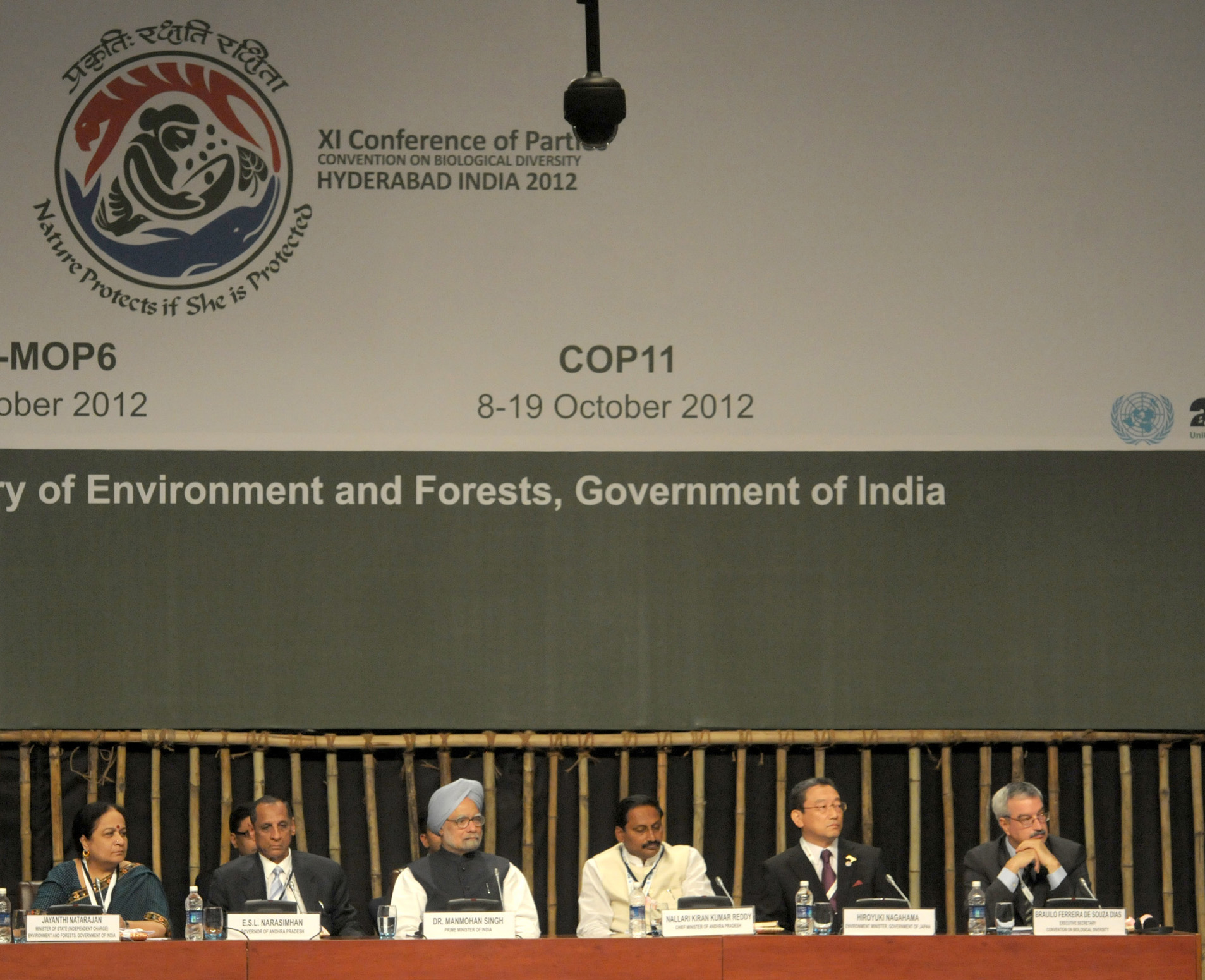
- Date: 1–19 October 2012
- Cities: Hyderabad, India
- Participants: Convention on Biological Diversity member countries
- Follows: ← Japan 2010
- Precedes: → South korea 2014
- Website: https://www.cbd.int/meetings/COP-11

The 2012 Hyderabad Conference of the Parties to the UN Convention on Biological Diversity (CBD), also known as COP11, was held in Hyderabad, India. Environment ministers and forest ministers of about 194 countries attended the conference; international organizations like World Bank and the Asian Development Bank also participated. Nearly 10,000 delegates discussed issues relating to biodiversity and biosafety.

== Logo ==
The COP11 logo consists of three major motifs, the Royal Bengal Tiger on the upper part, a woman with a bird and a leaf at the center and a dolphin on the lower part of the circle.

The Royal Bengal tiger represents all the terrestrial animals. It also represents Indian wild life. The Royal Bengal Tiger is an endangered species, and one of the main aims of CBD, is to reduce biodiversity loss. Thus, it conveys the distinctive character of the origination and its activities. The Dolphin represents the ocean. The family Delphinidae is the largest in the Cetacean order, they are found all over the world, and thus it represents the world aquatic life. The Woman represents The Mother Earth, who provides us with food, shelter and every basic necessity of human and other living creatures. The woman in the logo is winnowing grain in a typical Indian style representing Indian culture. The leaf and the bird stand for the flora and fauna. They are vital for our nature to survive. Thus they represent the balance of nature.

There are 22 official and 398 living languages in India. Amidst this lingual diversity, Sanskrit holds the thread of oneness as many of these languages are derived from Sanskrit. The English translation is placed circling the lower rim.

The logo forms a circle. The circle represents our planet Earth. Also it represents the circle of life, the dogma of our nature. In Indian philosophy, a circle is a bindu, a metaphysical term, which is proposed to be the point of origin of all creation. A circle has no beginning or end, thus symbolizing the universe in itself.
