= Telangana Joint Action Committee =

Telangana activist organisation

Telangana Joint Action Committee (TJAC) is an activist organisation in Telangana, India. It was formed on 24 December 2009 during the Telangana movement to seek the creation of a Telangana state, then a region of Andhra Pradesh, this was achieved in 2014.

It organised various protests for this purpose like the Sakkala Janula Samme, Million March, and Telangana March. It is an umbrella organisation comprising various wings such as students and employees. The Chairman of TJAC is M. Kodandaram.

== History ==
TJAC was formed in 2009 to bring all the organisations and political parties under one roof with the help of KCR. TRS is the main political force in the JAC. The Congress party and TDP were its members initially but withdrew later.

== Activities ==
TJAC has taken up various forms of protests like hunger strikes, road blocks, etc., for the formation of Telangana state. They celebrate carving out of Telangana State out of the state of United Andhra Pradesh.
