= History of the Telangana movement =

Coordinates: 17.99°N 79.59°E

The history of the Telangana movement refers to the political and social conditions under which the Telangana region was merged with Andhra State to form the state of Andhra Pradesh and the subsequent demands to reverse the merger to form a new state of Telangana from united Andhra Pradesh.

== Monarchy to Democracy ==
When India became independent from the British Empire in 1947, the Nizam of Hyderabad wanted Hyderabad State to remain independent under the special provisions given to princely states. The peasants of the state, influenced by Communist party, had also revolted against the Nizam, who tried to suppress their armed struggle against landlords.Qasim Razvi led the private Razakar army fighting for continuation of the Nizam's rule, and carried out the worst forms of atrocities on people. The Government of India liberated and assimilated the Hyderabad State on 17 September 1948, in an operation by the Indian Army called Operation Polo.

A Communist-led peasant revolt started in Telangana in 1946, which lasted until 1951. Hyderabad state included 9 Telugu speaking districts of Telangana, 4 Kannada districts in Gulbarga division & 4 Marathi speaking districts in Aurangabad division. Rangareddy district was carved out of Hyderabad district of Telangana in 1978. Now Telangana has 31 districts. Two districts were added in 2018, which made them 33 districts . Telangana has changed from 9 districts to 33 districts in just 30 years The Central Government appointed a civil servant, M. K. Vellodi, as First Chief Minister of Hyderabad state on 26 January 1950. He administered the state with the help of bureaucrats from Madras state and Bombay state. In 1952, Dr. Burgula Ramakrishna Rao was elected Chief minister of Hyderabad State in the first democratic election. During this time there were violent agitations by some Telanganites to send back bureaucrats from Madras state, and to strictly implement 'Mulki-rules'(Local jobs for locals only), which was part of Hyderabad state law since 1919.

In 1952, Telugu-speaking people were distributed in about 22 districts, 9 of them in the former Nizam's dominions of the princely state of Hyderabad, 12 in the Madras Presidency (Andhra region), and one in French-controlled Yanam. Meanwhile, Telugu-speaking areas in the Andhra region were carved out of the erstwhile Madras state by leaders like Potti Sri Ramulu to create Andhra State in 1953, with Kurnool as its capital.

In 1952, there was a students agitation against non Mulkis (mulki meaning locals). The agitation arose after many jobs were taken by people from coastal Andhra. The popular slogans were Non-Mulki go back and Idli Sambar go back. During the protests seven students were killed in police firing. Some sources claim that the Mulki Movement started as far back as 1927.

== Merging of Hyderabad State and Andhra ==
In December 1953, the States Reorganisation Commission was appointed to prepare for the creation of states on linguistic lines. The commission, due to public demand, recommended disintegration of Hyderabad state and to merge Marathi speaking region with Bombay state and Kannada speaking region with Mysore state.

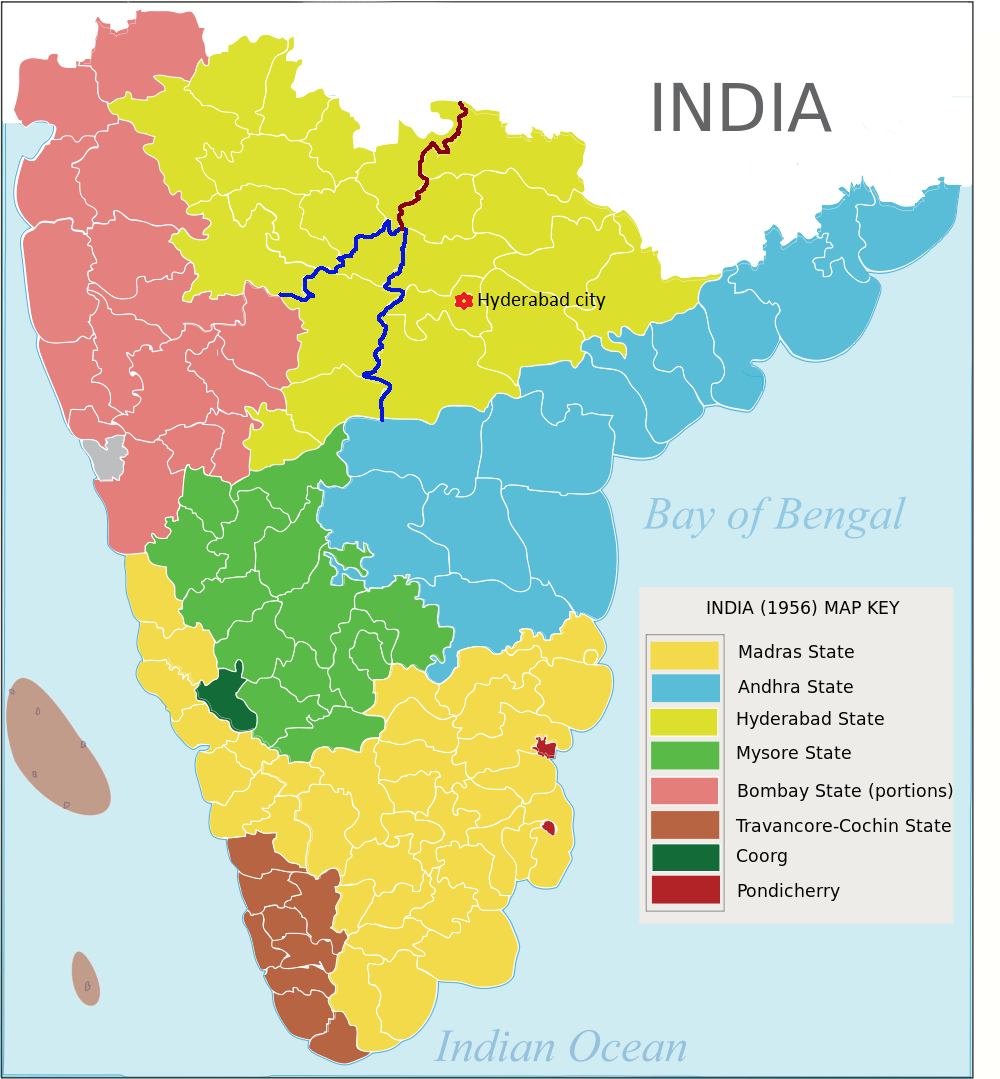
Hyderabad State in 1956 (in yellowish green). After reorganisation in 1956, regions of the state west of the red and blue lines merged with the Bombay and Mysore states respectively, and the rest of the state (Telangana) was merged with Andhra State to form Andhra Pradesh.

The States Reorganisation Commission (SRC) was not in favour of an immediate merger of Telugu speaking Telangana region with Andhra state, despite their common language. Paragraph 382 of the States Reorganisation Commission Report (SRC) said "opinion in Andhra is overwhelmingly in favour of the larger unit; public opinion in Telangana has still to crystallise itself. Important leaders of public opinion in Andhra themselves seem to appreciate that the unification of Telangana with Andhra, though desirable, should be based on a voluntary and willing association of the people and that it is primarily for the people of Telangana to take a decision about their future". The people of Telangana had several concerns. The region had a less-developed economy than Andhra, but with a larger revenue base (mostly because it taxed rather than prohibited alcoholic beverages), which people of Telangana feared might be diverted for use in Andhra. They feared that planned irrigation projects on the Krishna and Godavari rivers would not benefit Telangana proportionately, even though people of Telangana controlled the headwaters of the rivers. It was feared that the people of Andhra, who had access to higher standards of education under the British rule, would have an unfair advantage in seeking government and educational jobs.

The commission proposed that the Telangana region be constituted as a separate state with a provision for unification with Andhra state, after the 1961 general elections, if a resolution could be passed in the Telangana state assembly with a two-thirds majority. The Chief Minister of Hyderabad State, Burgula Ramakrishna Rao, expressed his view that a majority of Telangana people were against the merger. He supported the Congress party's central leadership decision to merge Telangana and Andhra despite opposition in Telangana. Andhra state assembly passed a resolution on 25 November 1955 to provide safeguards to Telangana. The resolution said, "Assembly would further like to assure the people in Telangana that the development of that area would be deemed to be special charge, and that certain priorities and special protection will be given for the improvement of that area, such as reservation in services and educational institutions on the basis of population and irrigational development." Telangana leaders did not believe the safeguards would work.

Hyderabad Chief minister in his letter to Congress President said Communist parties supported the merger for their political calculations. Hyderabad PCC chief said overwhelming majority from Congress party opposed the merger and Communists were elected in special circumstances in 1951 and Visalandhra was not a political issue in 1951 and Assembly does not reflect people's view on this issue. He also said 80% of Congress delegates who were elected in 1955 opposed merger. Government had to provide the additional security for Communist leaders who supported the Visalandhra.

In Hyderabad assembly out of 174 MLAs On 3 December 1955, 147 MLAs expressed their view. 103 MLA's (including Marathi and Kannada MLAs) supported the merger, 16 MLAs maintained neutral stand and 29 opposed merger. Among Telangana MLAs, 25 Telangana MLAs disagreed with the merger, 59 Telangana MLAs supported the merger. Out of 94 Telangana MLAs in the assembly, 36 were Communists (PDF), 40 were Congress, 11 were Socialist party (SP), 9 were independents. Voting did not take place on the resolution because Telangana proponents insisted on to including the phrase "As per the wishes of people" in the resolution.

With lobbying from Andhra Congress leaders and with pressure from the Central leadership of Congress party, an agreement was reached between Telangana leaders and Andhra leaders on 20 February 1956 to merge Telangana and Andhra with promises to safeguard Telangana's interests. This came to be known as the Gentlemen's agreement. The agreement allowed the formation of the state of Andhra Pradesh in 1956 itself, against the SRC's recommendations of waiting until 1961 to get the approval of 2/3 of Telangana state assembly after the 2 cycles of elections in Telangana state.

Prime minister Jawaharlal Nehru initially was skeptical of merging Telangana with Andhra State, fearing a "tint of expansionist imperialism" in it. He compared the merger to a matrimonial alliance having "provisions for divorce" if the partners in the alliance cannot get on well. Following the Gentlemen's agreement, the central government established a unified Andhra Pradesh on 1 November 1956. The agreement provided reassurances to Telangana in terms of power-sharing as well as administrative domicile rules and distribution of expenses of various regions.

== 1969 Telangana Agitation ==
In 1969, Telangana agitation arose after students felt betrayed and ensuing battle with the government and the students, 369 students were killed in police firing.

== See also ==
- Telangana History
- Samaikyandhra Movement
- Vishalandhra Movement
- Telangana Movement

Preceded by Indian Independence	Telangana movement 1952–1968	Succeeded by 1969-2003 Telangana protests
