= Pre-2004 Telangana protests =

Movements and agitations in India

Coordinates: 17.99°N 79.59°E

The Pre-2004 Telangana protests refers to the movements and agitations related to the Telangana movement that took place before the year 2004. Andhra state and Telangana was merged to form Andhra Pradesh state on 1 November 1956 after providing safeguards to Telangana in the form of Gentlemen's agreement. Soon after the formation of Andhra Pradesh, people of Telangana expressed dissatisfaction over how the agreements and guarantees were implemented. Protests initially led by students later under the leadership of newly formed political party Telangana Praja Samithi, led by M. Chenna Reddy and Konda Lakshman Bapuji, a minister who resigned from the cabinet led by then Chief Minister Kasu Brahmananda Reddy, demanding the formation of a separate state of Telangana. More than three hundred people died in police firing. Under the Mulki rules in force at the time, anyone who had lived in Hyderabad for 15 years was considered a local, and was thus eligible for certain government posts. When the Supreme Court upheld the Mulki rules at the end of 1972, the Jai Andhra movement, with the aim of re-forming a separate state of Andhra, was started in Coastal Andhra and Rayalaseema regions.

== 1952 Mulkhi Agitation ==
For the safeguard of jobs in Hyderabad State government. It was the first major event in Telangana movement.

== 1969 Telangana Agitation ==
In the years after the formation of Andhra Pradesh state, people of Telangana expressed dissatisfaction over how the agreements and guarantees were implemented. Discontent intensified in January 1969, when the guarantees that had been agreed on were supposed to lapse. All the Andhra employees who migrated to capital city in 1956 will be considered 'local' in 1969 after 12 years of residence per mulki rules. Student agitation for the continuation of the agreement began at Khammam and spread to other parts of the region. One section of students (which appeared dominant) wanted a separate state of Telangana while the other wanted implementation of safeguards. On 19 January, all party accord was reached to ensure the proper implementation of Telangana safeguards. Accord's main points were 1) All non-Telangana employees holding posts reserved for Telangana locals will be transferred immediately. 2) Telangana surpluses will be used for Telangana development. 3) Appleal to Telangana students to call off agitation.

On 23 January, protests turned violent when a crowd of about 1000 agitators tried to set fire to a Sub-Inspector's residence. This resulted in police firing in which 17 people were injured who were admitted to various hospitals. Meanwhile, certain Andhra employees challenged the transfer orders promised by the all party accord, by filing a petition in the AP high court. On 29 January, Army was called in by the government to maintain law & order as the Agitation quickly turned violent. In February, Mulki rules (local jobs for local people), as promised in Gentleman's agreement, were declared by high court as void but this judgement was stayed by divisional bench of high court. Quoting statistics of development in Telangana area over the last 12 years, the chief minister maintained the state of the Andhra Pradesh was "irreversible" and made an appeal to people to help maintain unity & integrity. Protests continued in March, and a bundh turned violent when protestors burnt buses.

In April, protestors tried to disrupt a meeting of CPI (which was opposed to the division of the state) by indulging in stone-pelting. Police had to resort to live firing after their attempts to control the crowd by lathi-charge & firing in the air didn't yield results. In the ensuing firing, 3 people were killed and several injured. Around 354 arrests were made related to various arson incidents during the agitation. Then Prime Minister Indira Gandhi called for a high-level meeting to discuss the issue while ruling out the division of the state. After several days of talks with leaders of both regions, on 12 April 1969, the Prime Minister developed an Eight point plan.

Eight point plan: This plan includes appointment of Five committees;

1. High-powered committee would be set up to determine financial surpluses to Telangana.
2. Telangana development committee
3. Plan implementation committee
4. Committee of jurists to be consulted on safeguards
5. Committees to look into grievances of public servants.

Telangana leaders were not satisfied with the accord. Protests continued under the leadership of newly formed political party Telangana Praja Samithi asking for the formation of Telangana and people continued to get killed in police firing.

Justice Bharagava committee

Justice Bhargava committee which looked into Telangana surpluses, found that 283 million rupees was diverted from Telangana to Andhra region between 1956 and 1968. Economist C H Hanumanth Rao further analysed the data from the committee report and concluded that for Telangana, cumulative surplus with interest during that period was 1.174 Billion rupees. During this period, the revenue budget of the state grew from 586 million rupees in 1957 to 2.04 billion rupees in 1968.

Government employees and opposition members of the state legislative assembly threatened "direct action" in support of the students. Purushotham Rao was for outright separation, and he supported the student views. He unveiled a map of Telangana in the state assembly. A memorial called Gun Park was built near Public Gardens, Hyderabad to commemorate students who lost their lives in the struggles of 1969.

Telangana Praja Samithi and Chenna Reddy

Although the Congress faced some dissension within its ranks, its leadership stood against additional linguistic states. As a result, defectors from the Congress, led by M. Chenna Reddy, founded the Telangana Praja Samithi political party in 1969. In the May 1971 parliamentary elections, Telangana Praja Samithi won 10 out the 14 Parliament seats in Telangana. Despite these electoral successes, some of the new party leaders gave up their agitation in September 1971 after realising that the Prime Minister was not inclined to towards a separate state of Telangana, and rejoined the safer political haven of the Congress ranks.

During this period, the Government promised to correct what critics saw as a violation of the promises of the Gentleman's agreement in the areas of jobs, budget allocations, and educational facilities. Prime Minister Indira Gandhi was strongly against the division of the state, but on her recommendation, P. V. Narasimha Rao became the first Chief minister of Andhra Pradesh from Telangana on 30 September 1971.

In 1972, candidates of the Telangana Praja Samithi party contested all the available seats for the assembly elections. However, only Thakkalapalli Purushothama Rao got elected, from Wardhannapet constituency in Warangal District.

== 1972 Jai Andhra Movement ==
Under the Mulki rules in force at the time, anyone who had lived in Hyderabad for 15 years was considered a local, and was thus eligible for certain government posts. When the Supreme Court upheld the Mulki rules at the end of 1972, the Jai Andhra movement, with the aim of re-forming a separate state of Andhra, was started in Coastal Andhra and Rayalaseema regions. P. V. Narasimha Rao resigned as Chief minister of Andhra Pradesh on 10 January 1973, and President's rule was declared in the state.

== Six-Point Formula of 1973 ==
On 21 September 1973, a political settlement was reached with the Government of India with a Six-Point Formula. It was agreed upon by the leaders of the two regions to prevent any recurrence of such agitations in the future.

1. Accelerated development of the backward areas of the State, and planned development of the State capital, with specific resources earmarked for these purposes; and appropriate representation of such backward areas in the State legislature, along with other experts, should formulate and monitor development schemes for the areas. The formation at the State level of a Planning Board as well as Sub-Committees for different backward areas should be the appropriate instrument for achieving this objective.
2. Institution of uniform arrangements throughout the State enabling adequate preference being given to local candidates in the matter of admission to educational institutions, and establishment of a new Central University at Hyderabad to augment the existing educational facilities should be the basis of the educational policy of the State.
3. Subject to the requirements of the State as a whole, local candidates should be given preference to specified extent in the matter of direct recruitment to (i) non-gazetted posts (other than in the Secretariat. Offices of Heads of Department, other State level offices and institutions and the Hyderabad City Police) (ii) corresponding posts under the local bodies and (iii) the posts of Tahsildars, Junior Engineers and Civil Assistant Surgeons. To improve their promotion prospects, service cadres should be organised to the extent possible on appropriate local basis up to specified gazetted level, first or second, as may be administratively convenient.
4. A high-power administrative tribunal should be constituted to deal with the grievances of services regarding appointments, seniority, promotion and other allied matters. The decisions of the Tribunal should ordinarily be binding on the State Government. The constitution of such a tribunal would justify limits on recourse to judiciary in such matters.
5. In order that implementation of measures based on the above principles does not give rise to litigation and consequent uncertainty, the Constitution should be suitably amended to the extent necessary conferring on the President enabling powers in this behalf.
6. The above approach would render the continuance of Mulki Rules and Regional Committee unnecessary.

To avoid legal problems, constitution was amended (32nd amendment) to give the legal sanctity to the Six-point formula.

In 1985, when Telangana employees complained about the violations to six-point formula, government enacted government order 610 (GO 610) to correct the violations in recruitment. As Telangana people complained about non-implementation of GO 610, in 2001, government constituted Girglani commission to look into violations.

== Movement (1990–2004) ==
In 1997, the state unit of the Bharatiya Janata Party (BJP) passed a resolution seeking a separate Telangana. Though the party created the states of Jharkhand, Chhattisgarh, and Uttarakhand in 2000, it could not create a separate Telangana state because of lack of consensus with the Telugu Desam Party, which extended outside support to its government at the centre. Congress party MLAs from the Telangana region who supported a separate Telangana state formed the Telangana Congress Legislators Forum and submitted memorandum to their president Sonia Gandhi requesting the support the Telangana state.

A new political party called Telangana Rashtra Samithi (TRS), led by Kalvakuntla Chandrashekar Rao (KCR), was formed in 2001 with the single-point agenda of creating a separate Telangana state with Hyderabad as its capital.

In 2001, the Congress Working Committee sent a resolution to the NDA government for constituting a second SRC to look into the Telangana state demand. This was rejected by then union home minister L.K. Advani citing that smaller states were neither viable nor conducive to the integrity of the country.

In April 2002, Advani wrote a letter to MP A. Narendra rejecting a proposal to create Telangana state explaining that "regional disparities in economic development could be tackled through planning and efficient use of available resources". He said that the NDA government, therefore, does "not propose creation of a separate state of Telangana"

In October 2012, Advani said "Had our partner TDP cooperated with us during NDA tenure, there would have been separate Telangana".

== See also ==
- Telangana Movement
- Jai Andhra Movement
- Samaikyandhra Movement
- Vishalandhra Movement

| Preceded by 1952–1968 Telangana protests | Telangana movement 1969–2003 | Succeeded by 2004-2010 Telangana protests |
