= 2004–2010 Telangana protests =

Movements and Agitations related to the Telangana movement

Coordinates: 17.99°N 79.59°E

The Telangana protests 2004-2010 refers to the movements and agitations related to the Telangana movement that took place between the years 2004 and 2010. For the 2004 Assembly and Parliament elections, the Congress party and the TRS had an electoral alliance in the Telangana region to consider the demand of separate Telangana State. However, again in 2006, the then Chief Minister Y. S. Rajasekhara Reddy categorically said that the state would remain united. This again resulted in statewide protests. In 2009, Union Minister of Home Affairs P. Chidambaram announced that the Indian government would start the process of forming a separate Telangana state, pending the introduction and passage of a separation resolution in the Andhra Pradesh assembly after an 11-day fast by K. Chandrashekar Rao. This again resulted in protests across both Andhra and Rayalseema as in a short time of the Home Minister's declaration, MLAs from the Coastal Andhra and Rayalaseema regions submitted their resignations in protest.

== 2004 to 2009 ==
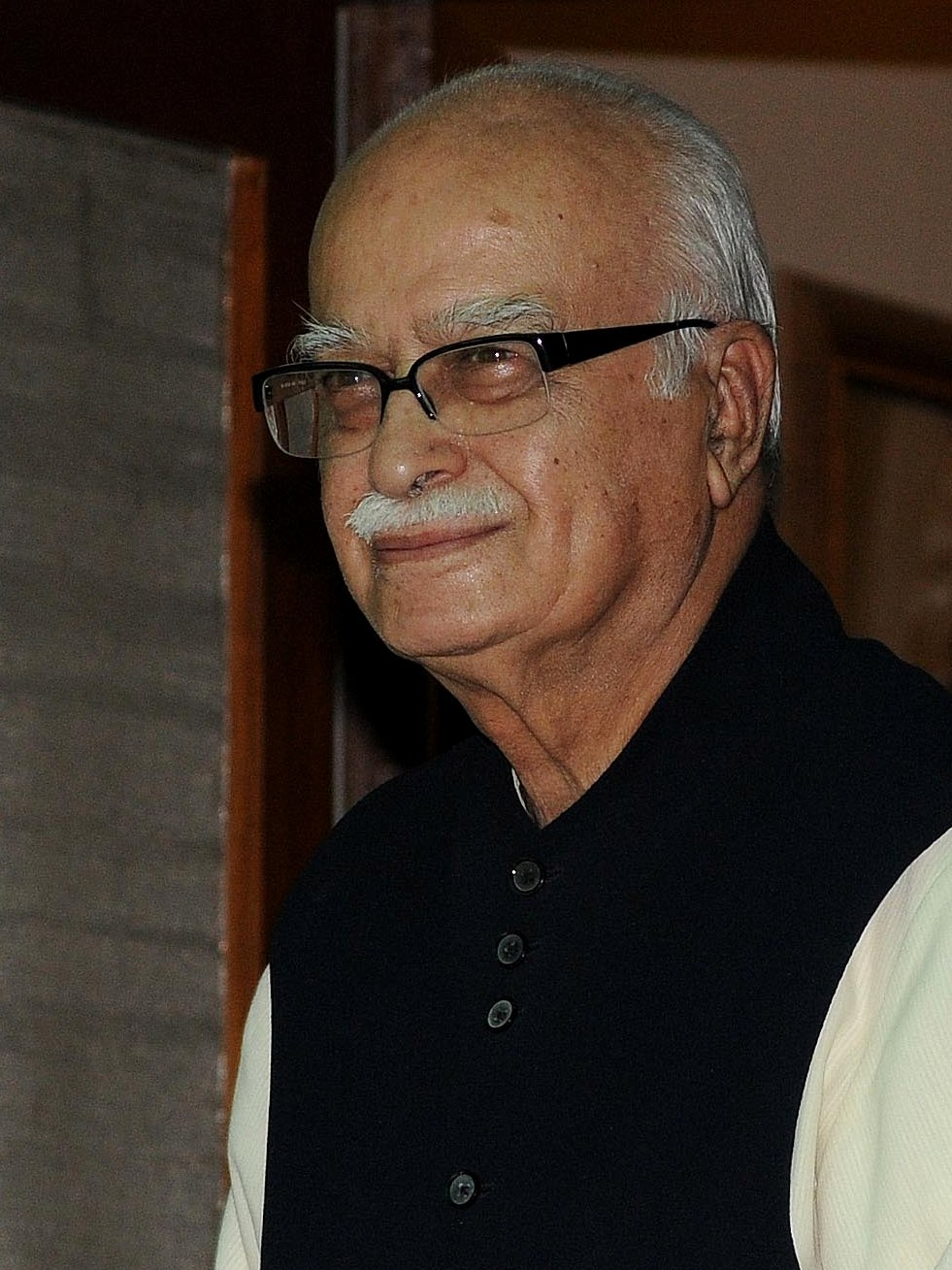
NDA Home Minister L.K. Advani who rejected inclusion of Telangana in the NDA agenda

In the run-up to the 2004 Assembly & Parliament elections, then Union Home Minister L. K. Advani ruled out inclusion of Telangana in the NDA agenda and said "Unless there is consensus among all political parties in the state and unless that consensus is reflected in a resolution of the state Assembly, we don’t propose to include it in the NDA agenda"

For these elections, the Congress party and the TRS forged an electoral alliance in the Telangana region to consider the demand of separate Telangana State. Congress came to power in the state and formed a coalition government at the centre; TRS joined the coalition after the common minimum programme of the coalition government included that the demand for separate Telangana state will be considered after due consultations and consensus.

In the 2004 Parliament's winter session, BJP advised TRS & Congress not to talk about separate Telangana and concentrate on more important issues such as suicides & starvation deaths. The Congress stood by the CWC resolution favouring a second SRC on the demand for smaller states.

In April 2006 the then Chief Minister Y. S. Rajasekhara Reddy categorically said that the state would remain united. In September 2006 TRS withdrew support from the coalition government for failing to create an independent Telangana state.

In December 2006 the TRS won a by-election to the Karimnagar parliamentary constituency with a margin of 2.01 lakh votes. TRS and Congress leaders from Telangana continued their fight for the creation of a Telangana state in 2008. All TRS legislators in Parliament and in the State (4 MPs, 16 MLAs, and 3 MLCs) resigned in the first week of March 2008 and forced by-elections to increase pressure on the Congress party to take action. By-elections for the 16 MLA seats and the 4 MP seats were held on 29 May 2008. During the election campaign, the TRS party called the by-election a referendum on a Telangana state. The Congress and TDP parties said it is not a referendum on Telangana, and said that they were not opposed to the formation of Telangana state. In June 2008, T. Devender Goud, a politbureau member and Deputy Leader of the Telugu Desam Party, resigned from the party, saying he would devote his time and energy to the formation of a separate Telangana state. In July 2008, Goud and other leaders such as E. Peddi Reddy formed a new party called Nava Telangana Praja Party (NTPP). On 9 October 2008 the TDP announced its support for the creation of Telangana. Konda Laxman Bapuji of the Nava Telangana Party announced that "We solemnly declare statehood for Telangana on 2 November 2008."

== 2009 to 2010 ==
=== 2009 Assembly & Parliament Elections ===
In February 2009 the state government declared that it had no objection, in principle, to the formation of separate Telangana and that the time had come to move forward decisively on this issue. To resolve related issues, the government constituted a joint house committee. In the lead-up to the 2009 General Elections in India, all the major parties in Andhra Pradesh supported the formation of Telangana. The Bharatiya Janata Party (BJP) again announced that they would create two more states, Telangana and Gorkhaland, if they won the election. The Congress Party said it was committed to Telangana statehood, but claimed that Muslim minorities were opposed to the creation of separate state, along with the majority of the people. The MIM party and Muslim leaders within Congress felt that the new state would jeopardise the interests of minorities, the safety and welfare of Muslims, and the future of the Urdu language.

The Telugu Desam Party promised to work for Telangana statehood. Telangana Rashtra Samithi (TRS) joined a Maha Kutami (Grand Alliance) with the TDP and other parties to defeat the Congress party for denying statehood. The Praja Rajyam Party (PRP), founded in August 2008 by film star Chiranjeevi, pledged support to Telangana statehood if it becomes inevitable. The NTPP announced that it would merge with PRP after it concluded that there was not enough political space for two sub-regional Telangana parties that had Telananga statehood as their main agenda, Goud later quit PRP and returned to the Telugu Desam Party.

In the 2009 elections, Congress returned to power both at the center and state. It won 154 out of 294 Assembly seats and 33 out of 42 Parliament seats. Within Telangana, Congress won 50 out of 119 Assembly seats and 12 out of 17 Parliament seats. TRS managed to win only 10 assembly seats out of the 45 it contested and only 2 MP seats.

=== YSR's death & KCR's fast ===
Within few months of getting re-elected as popular CM, Y. S. Rajasekhara Reddy (YSR) died in a helicopter crash in September 2009. This resulted in a leadership crisis within the Congress party and also created a political vacuum in the state. During this time, TRS president K. Chandrashekar Rao (KCR) raised his pitch for the separate state. On 29 November 2009, he started a fast-unto-death, with the demand of a separate state apart, the immediate objective of this fast-unto-death agitation was to identify the lands that were encroached upon by realtors in and around Hyderabad and returned to the poor. He was arrested by the police. Student organisations, employee unions, and various organisations joined the movement. KCR had told a Congress emissary on 6 December that he would break his fast if Congress president Sonia Gandhi made a public appeal to him to do so. General strikes shut down Telangana on 6 and 7 December.

In an all party meeting called by the state government on the night of 7 December to discuss regarding KCR's fast and how to handle it, all major Opposition parties extended their support for a separate state for Telangana. The state Congress and its ally Majlis-e-Ittehadul Muslimeen have left it to the Congress high command to take a final decision. Minutes of the meeting were faxed to Congress high command. Student organisations planned a massive rally at the state Assembly on 10 December without government permission. This prompted deployment of police troops throughout Telangana. The apparent decline in KCR's health led to a sense of urgency to the issue.

== Bifurcation Announcement & rollback ==
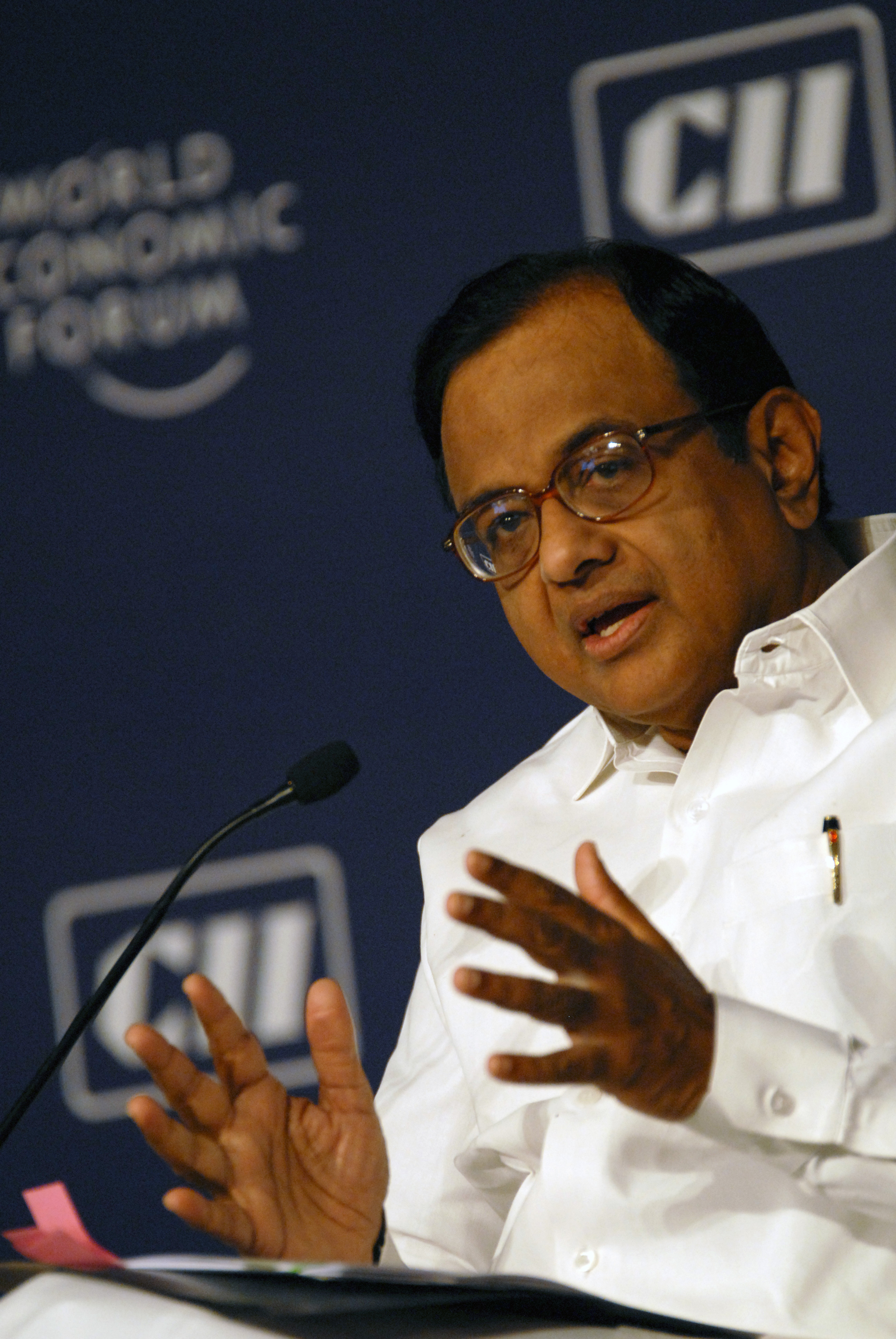
Palaniappan Chidambaram

On 9 December 2009, Union Minister of Home Affairs P. Chidambaram announced that the Indian government would start the process of forming a separate Telangana state, pending the introduction and passage of a separation resolution in the Andhra Pradesh assembly. KCR ended his 11-day fast claiming it a "true victory of the people of Telangana." Pro-Telangana supporters celebrated the central government decision, while those from the Coastal Andhra and Rayalaseema regions protested. Within a short time of the Home Minister's declaration, MLAs from the Coastal Andhra and Rayalaseema regions submitted their resignations in protest. By 16 December, at least 147 MLAs including Praja Rajyam Founder and Telugu actor Chiranjeevi and 22 ministers along with many MPs had resigned.

On 16 December, there was a split in the Praja Rajyam Party (PRP) over the Telangana issue, with its leader Chiranjeevi as well as 16 out of 18 party MLAs opposing the division of Andhra Pradesh, while Telangana leaders in the party were unhappy with the shift in the party's views. On 23 December, the Government of India announced that no action on Telangana will be taken until a consensus is reached by all parties. Subsequently, Coastal Andhra and Rayalaseema region MLAs & MPs withdrew their resignations.

== Formation of Telangana (TJAC/JAC) ==
The TRS reacted by calling for another general strike on 24 December 2009 which was aimed at stalling the regional economy. A Joint Action Committee (JAC) was formed with the pro-separation members of the major political parties. There were reports that members of the JAC had widely divergent approaches on the issue of a separate Telangana. MLAs and ministers from Telangana submitted their resignations demanding immediate steps to initiate the process of bifurcating Andhra Pradesh. Pro-Telangana protestors & Osmania University students attacked then Telugu Desam Party leader Nagam Janardhan Reddy, pushed him down, kicked and rained blows on him till he escaped on a bike.

The Home minister conducted an all-party meeting on 5 January to elicit views of all parties in the State. On the advice of Congress party's central leadership, all of the Ministers from Telangana withdrew their resignations. Rallies, hunger strikes, and suicides continued throughout Telangana to protest against the delay in bifurcating the State.

Security establishments submitted an assessment to the prime minister that the creation of Chhattisgarh and Jharkhand helped Maoists entrench better, as they took advantage of administrative problems in a new state. Similarly they said "Remnants of the Maoist movement are strongest in Telangana so any break-up of the state (Andhra) will help them". On 3 January 2010 Varavara rao, a Maoist Emissary gave an open call at OU students march to launch a militant fight for the statehood cause. On 6 January 2010, TJAC said the strikes, rail-blockades, various protests would not have been held peacefully if Maoists had infiltrated the pro-Telangana movement. It blamed some Andhra leaders for those allegations. It questioned, how the Maoists could have joined the movement when state government claims that the naxalism had been wiped out in the State?

The JAC started relay hunger strikes and threatened the resignations of all legislators on 28 January, demanding that the Centre spell out its intentions and create a timetable for change. It said the agitations would continue until a Bill was passed in Parliament. On 3 February, the JAC organised human chain a distance of 500 kilometres (310 mi) from north to south in Telangana. Organizers claimed its longest human chain in India. The Jamaat-e-Islami Hind supported a separate Telangana state with the slogan "Justice for Telangana and Telangana for Justice" under the leadership of Malik Motasim Khan. The Jamaat, along with its student wing Students Islamic Organisation of India, organised a massive public meet at Nizam College grounds on 7 February 2010 Prominent leaders such as Kalvakuntla Chandrashekar Rao, Hamid Mohammed Khan and Khaja Arifuddin addressed the crowd. On 16 February, Congress legislators from the Telangana region resigned from the Joint Action Committee due to "unilateral actions by KCR.".

== Formation of Justice Sri Krishna Committee ==
On 3 February the government announced the five-member committee that would look into the issue. It also announced Terms of Reference to the Srikrishna Committee, with a deadline of 31 December 2010. Telangana-JAC rejected the terms of reference saying that it "undid" the Union home minister's statement of 9 December in New Delhi. All ten TRS MLAs, one TDP MLA, and one BJP MLA insisted that the speaker of Assembly accept their resignations. The rest of the Telangana MLAs withdrew their resignations.

The SKC reported that there were a purported 313 suicides in Telangana between 30 November 2009 and 27 February 2010 according to news reports, but has not confirmed the veracity of the data

In a report submitted to the Srikrishna Committee, ministers from Seema-Andhra region stated that the demand for separate Telangana under grounds of self-respect and self-rule is anti-national and will sow seeds for disintegration of the country. This statement evoked strong protests in Telangana and demands for the dismissal of those ministers.

All the Telangana MLAs who resigned in protest in February were re-elected in by-elections on 27 July 2010 with huge majorities. Congress and TDP candidates who decided to contest the elections, ignoring the appeal of JAC, lost their deposits by obtaining less than one-sixth of the votes in many constituencies. TDP candidates lost their deposits in all constituencies. On 16 December 2010, two weeks before the deadline for the submission of the Srikrishna report, TRS organised a public meeting in Warangal. It was estimated that 1.2 to 1.5 million people attended this meeting. It was reported that even more would have attended, but they were stranded on the roads due to traffic jams reaching between 20 kilometres (12 mi) to 35 kilometres (22 mi) along roads leading to the city. Telangana Rashtra Samithi president K. Chandrasekhar Rao appealed to prime minister Manmohan Singh to note that the people of Telangana were losing patience. He demanded that the Centre introduce the Bill on Telangana in the next session of Parliament.

== See also ==
- Samaikyandhra Movement
- Vishalandhra Movement
- Telangana Movement

Preceded by 1969–2003 Telangana protests	Telangana movement 2004–2010	Succeeded by Srikrishna committee's involvement
