= Chowdary Satyanarayana =

Andhra politician (1908–1981)

Jananayak Chowdary Satyanarayana
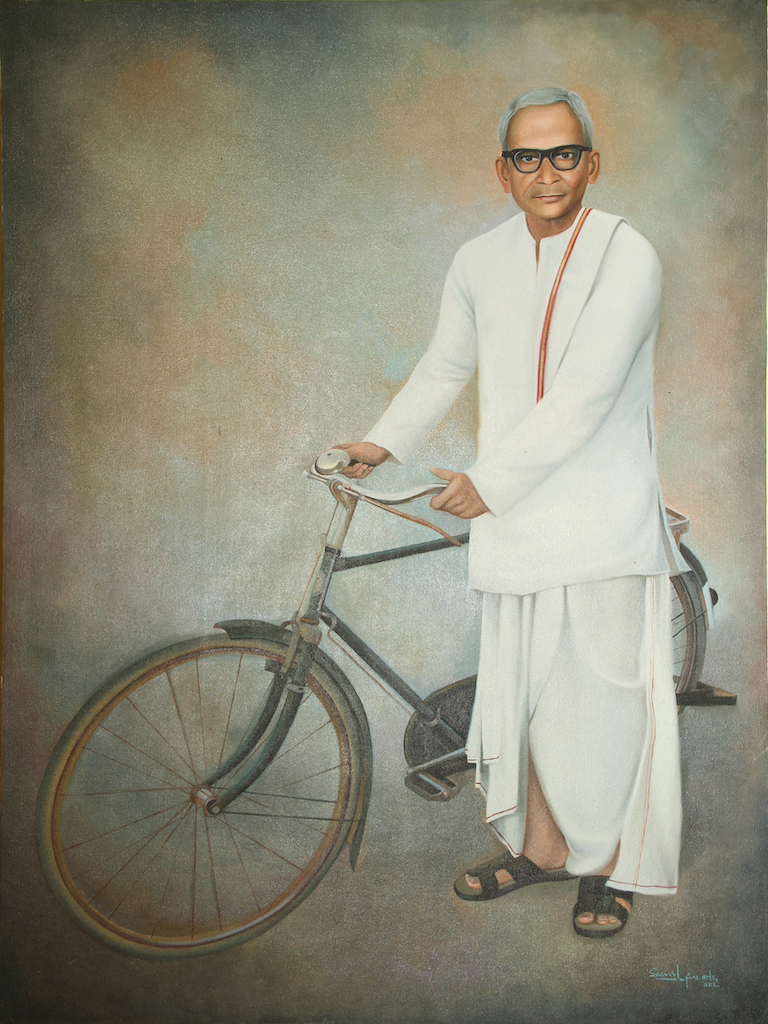
- Born: 13 July 1908; SM Puram
- Died: 15 July 1981 (aged 73); SM Puram
- Monuments: Statue
- Known for: Indian Freedom Movement, Anti-Zamindari Movement, Civil Rights Activism
- Political party: Indian National Congress, Krishikar Lok Party, Swatantra Party, OPDR
- Spouse: Saraswatamma
- Children: 9
- Awards: 'Tamrapatra' given by Government of India

Chowdary Satyanarayana (13 July 1908 – 15 July 1981), also known as Jananayaka Chowdary Satyanarayana, was an Indian freedom fighter, anti-colonial nationalist, politician, legislator in Andhra Pradesh Assembly (1955–1962, 1967–1972) and a civil rights activist.

Born and raised in a Hindu Zamindar family who belongs to Kalinga community, was from Srikakulam, a coastal district in Andhra Pradesh. He was well known as Cycle MLA in Srikakulam district as he used only cycle to commute even when he was serving as the Member of Legislative Assembly, Andhra Pradesh and always led a simple life.

== Personal information ==
=== Childhood ===
He was born on 13 July 1908, to Chowdari Purushottama Naidu and Narayanamma as their second child in Sher Mohammad Puram (SM Puram) village of Ganjam District (now in Srikakulam District) of erstwhile Madras province. He belongs to 'Kalinga' community and was born into a rich zamindar family

=== Education ===
His early education was done in the native village SM Puram. He studied in Srikakulam Municipal High School (now NTR Municipal High School) from 1st form to 4th form.

=== Marriage ===
He married Saraswatamma, daughter of Boddepalli Rammurthy Naidu & Lakshmamma of Kanugulavalasa village, Amadalavalasa Mandal when he was just eight years old. Satyanarayana & Saraswatamma had 9 children.

== Indian freedom movement ==
Drawing inspiration from Mahatma Gandhi, Subhash Chandra Bose he took part in freedom movement and participated in Satyagrahas and protests against the colonial rule.

=== Freedom fighter ===
- 1921 - On the call given by the then Indian National Congress, he participated in school boycott when he was studying 3rd form and was just 13 years old. He had to suffer severe injuries as the police beat him for participating the protest. It took around 6 months time to recover completely from the injuries. Thus he started his freedom movement at an early age.
- 1929 - He participated in "Salt heaps looting" under the leadership of Ramalingam Master in Naupada.
- 1934 - He joined as a Revenue Inspector in Tenneti Viswanatham Estate in Budumuru.
- 1935 - Before completing one year, he resigned from the job in protest against the British rule.
- 1940 - After the failure of August Offer, Mahatma Gandhi initiated the Vyakti Satyagraham (also known as 'Chalo Delhi Movement') to affirm the right to free speech and to propagate views against the participation of war when the very democracy for which the war was fought was denied to India. He was not in favour of a mass Satyagraha to avoid violence. The first Satyagrahi was Vinoba Bhave followed by Jawaharlal Nehru and Brahma Datt. All the three were arrested. Gandhiji had carefully chosen his few of his followers in every locality across the country to do the satyagraha on individual basis. Chowdari Satyanarayana was one of them. He started his Satyagraha at seven roads junction in Srikakulam Town. The British government arrested him under violation of Defence of India Act and imprisoned him for six months.
- 1942 - When Gandhi visited Dusi Railway Station as part of the Quit India movement, he met Gandhiji and presented a Dhoti made of Ponduru Khadi.
- 1942 - As part of Quit India movement, he participated in destroying British Government's properties. He along with his colleagues removed railway tracks between Dusi Railway Station and Boddepalli village, set fire to Kalingapatnam post office, destroyed communication systems etc. During this period he had to spend most of the time in anonymity to escape the police arrests. He served three months imprisonment for destroying Kalingapatnam post office.
- 1946 - On confirmation of independence to India, all political prisoners were released from jail. He was one among them who was released after being in jail for 9 months.

During his participation in freedom movement, he was put in Cuddalore, Kannanur, Rajahmundry central jails at different times.

=== Leader of peasants ===
Though he was born in a zamindar family, he fought against the zamindari system.

- 1936 - Under the leadership of NG Ranga, participated in 'Rythu Rakshana Yatra' (Farmers Protection March) from Ichchapuram to Madras, along with Killi Appalanaidu and others.
- 1945 - He extended his complete support and fought for the rights of the people who revolted against the Zamindari System in Mandasa, Srikakulam District.
- 1947 - Organised 'Ubhaya Visakha Mandala Dwitiya Kisan Congress Maha Sabha' in his native village SM Puram in which the former President of India VV Giri and Prof. NG Ranga participated.

== Post independence political career ==
He served as Member of Legislative Assembly of Andhra Pradesh twice for a cumulative period of 12 years.

- 1951 - Resigned from Indian National Congress and joined Krishikar Lok Party.
- 1955 - Contested from SM Puram Constituency as a candidate of Krishikar Lok Party and won for the first time as MLA of Andhra Pradesh Assembly.
- 1967 - He won for the second time as legislature to Andhra Pradesh Assembly as a candidate of Swatantra Party from Ponduru Constituency.
- 1972 - He resigned from traditional politics in protest of the events taking place for power between individuals and parties.
- 1974 - He joined with Tarimella Nagireddy and Sri Sri (Srirangam Srinivasa Rao) to launch Human Rights activism.
- 1975 - He served as the founding state Vice President of OPDR (Organisation for Protection of Democratic Rights) Andhra Pradesh wing.
- 1975 - He led the Human Rights Activism initiated by OPDR in Srikakulam District.

=== Movement for separate Andhra State ===
All Telugu speaking people in Madras State demanded for a separate state. Potti Sreeramulu started fast unto death demanding a new state. Chowdari Satyanarayana conducted protests and rallies in Srikakulam demanding a separate state.

=== Geetha Satyagraha ===
The then state government implemented prohibition in Andhra State. As a result, the poor toddy tappers were left unemployed across the state. Geetha Satyagraha was launched in 1954 demanding to allow tapping toddy by the respective community as it was the only means of their livelihood. Chowdari Satyanarayana was imprisoned for 7 months for organising the protests in Srikakulam District.

=== Jai Andhra movement ===
Jai Andhra movement is a 1972 political movement in support for the creation of Andhra state in the light of injustices felt by the people of the Coastal Andhra and Rayalaseema Regions. This was after the HC and SC upheld the Mulki rules in existence at the time. As an MLA, in the assembly, he demanded for an early resolution by the government. He participated in many agitations in support of the movement. He was put under house arrest as well as arrested by the police for taking part in the movement.

== Civil Rights Activism ==
In 1974, he associated with Tarimella Nagireddy (Ideologist) and Sri Sri (Srirangam Srinivas Rao). Organisation for Protection of Democratic Rights of the people (OPDR) was formed for Civil Rights Activism. Chowdari Satyanarayana served as Vice President of OPDR's AP wing and as well as its Srikakulam District President until his death in 1981. He was the pioneer of Civil Rights Activism in Srikakulam District. He fought for the rights of the tribals and represented to Central & State Human Rights Commissions. He was instrumental in guiding the fact-finding committee which was formed against the police tyranny on the tribals.

== Honours ==
- In 1972, on the occasion of India's 25 years of independence, Government of India honoured Chowdari Satyanarayana with "Tamrapatra" for his remarkable contribution for Indian Freedom Movement.
- A colony in the jurisdiction of Srikakulam municipality is named after him as "Chowdari Satyanarayana Colony".
- A colony for scheduled castes in SM Puram village is named after him.
- A statue of Chowdari Satyanarayana has been placed at the entrance of Srikakulam town by the Government.
- 'Jananayak Dr. Chowdari Satyanarayana' Sportsman of the year Award named after him which is given every year by a Sports Trust in Srikakulam.
- Honorary Doctorate recipient (Posthumously)

== Gallery ==
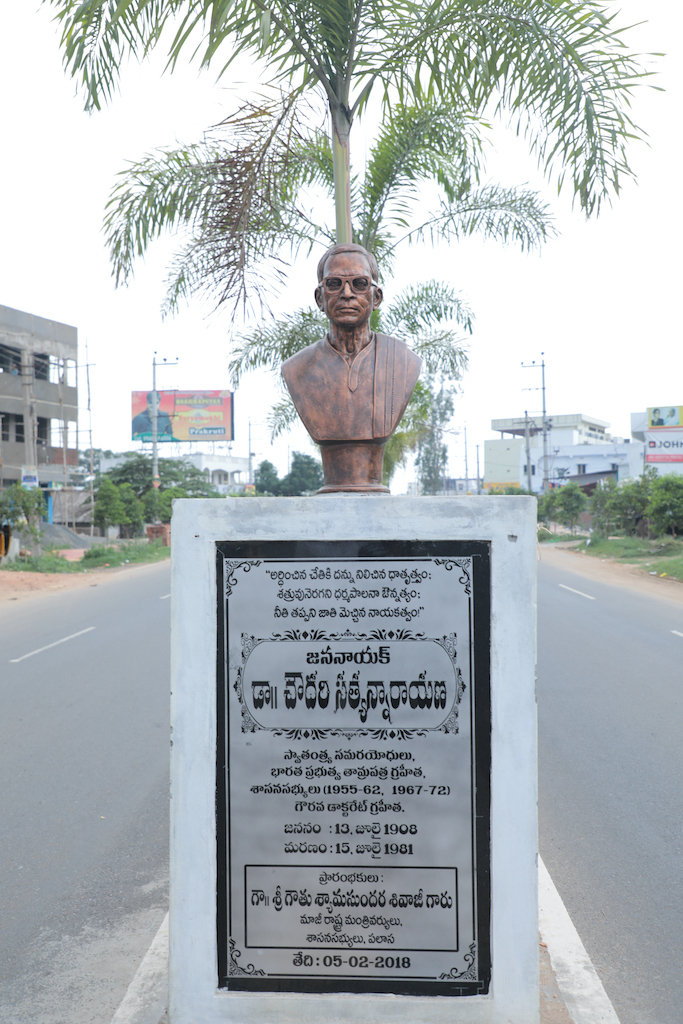
Chowdari Satyanarayana statue at the entrance of Srikakulam town

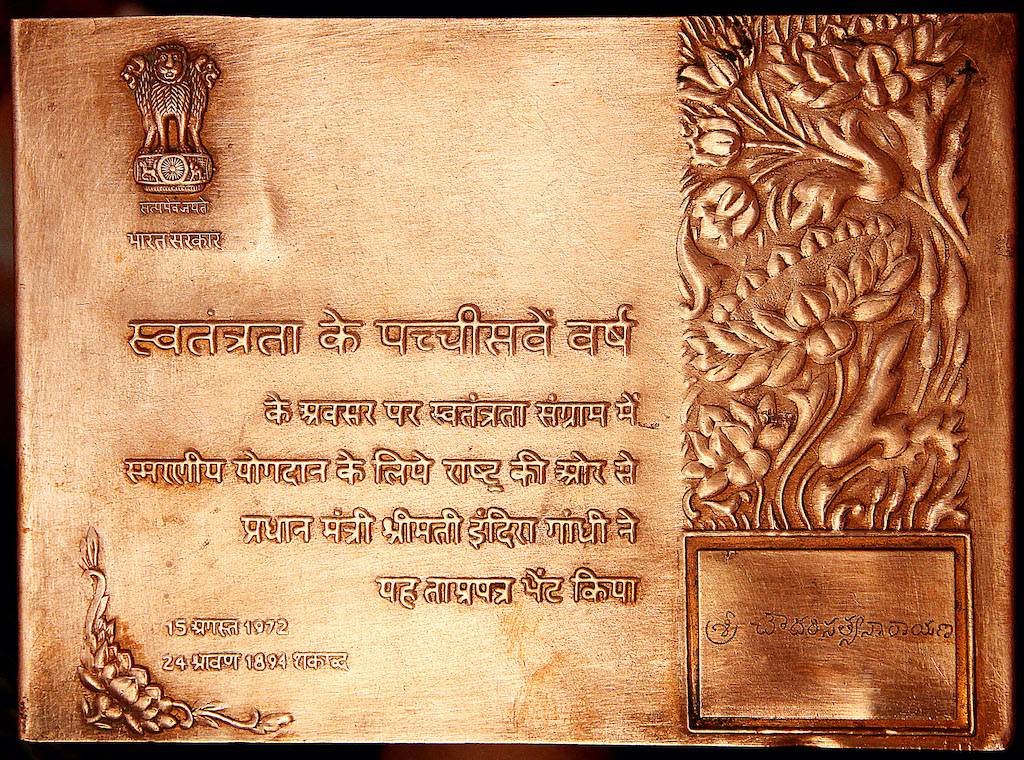
Tamrapatra presented by government of India

Government School in Chowdari Satyanarayana Colony, Srikakulam

== Testimonials ==
- "Chowdari Satyanarayana is an inspiration for many. He is 'The Jananayak' a true people's leader". - V. V. Giri, Former President of India; Dt. April 1947
- "Without CSN, the Human Rights activism in Uttarandhra wouldn't have taken shape" - T. Nagi Reddy, Founder of OPDR, Former Legislator & pioneer of Rights activism in Andhra Pradesh.
- "The torch bearer of Truth & Integrity; the man of masses who lived until his last breath for the welfare of the downtroden families." - Sri Sri, Progressive Poet, co-founder of OPDR, Human Rights Activist; Dt. Remembered him on the day of mourning after the death of CSN in August 1981
- Organisation for Protection of Democratic Rights (OPDR) Resolution dated 19, July 1981 Copy of OPDR Resolution
