= Srikrishna Committee =

Indian committee to look into the demand for the statehood of Telangana

Srikrishna Committee on Telangana or the Committee for Consultations on the Situation in Andhra Pradesh (CCSAP) was a committee headed by Justice B. N. Srikrishna (former judge of Supreme Court of India and chief justice of Kerala High Court) that looked into the demand for separate statehood for Telangana or keeping the State united in the present form, as Andhra Pradesh. The committee was constituted by the Government of India on 3 February 2010 and submitted its report on 30 December 2010 to the Ministry of Home Affairs.

The Srikrishna Committee solicited suggestions and views from political parties, social organisations, and other stakeholders. The committee received over 60,000 petitions by the deadline of 10 April. The committee began personal interactions with the various stakeholders, including the political parties on 16 April. The committee met with the leaders of TRS, PRP, CPI, MIM, TDP, and various organisations from throughout Andhra Pradesh. On 6 July, Telangana congress legislators and ministers met with the Srikrishna committee and made arguments in favour of the formation of Telangana state.

It toured all the regions of state extensively and invited people from all sections of the society to give their opinion on the statehood. It received over a hundred thousand petitions and representations from political parties, organisations, NGOs and individuals. It also held consultations with political parties and the general public, factoring in the impact of recent developments on different sections of society such as women, children, students, minorities, Other Backward Classes, as well as Scheduled Castes and Scheduled Tribes.

The report was released to the public on the internet on 6 January 2011.

== Members ==
- Justice Srikrishna
- Professor (Dr.) Ranbir Singh, vice-chancellor, National Law University, Delhi
- Dr. Abusaleh Shariff, senior research fellow, International Food Policy Research Institute, Delhi
- Dr. (Ms.) Ravinder Kaur, professor, Department of Humanities and Social Sciences, IIT Delhi
- Vinod K. Duggal, former Home Secretary, who also functioned as its member-secretary.

== Terms of reference ==
There are seven terms of reference for the committee.

1. To examine the situation in the State of Andhra Pradesh with reference to the demand for a separate State of Telangana as well as the demand for maintaining the present status of a united Andhra Pradesh.
2. To review the developments in the State since its formation and their impact on the progress and development of the different regions of the State.
3. To examine the impact of the recent developments in the State on the different sections of the people such as women, children, students, minorities, other backward classes, scheduled castes and scheduled tribes.
4. To identify the key issues that must be addressed while considering the matters mentioned in items (1), (2) and (3) above.
5. To consult all sections of the people, especially the political parties, on the aforesaid matters and elicit their views; to seek from the political parties and other organisations a range of solutions that would resolve the present difficult situation and promote the welfare of all sections of the people; to identify the optimal solutions for this purpose; and to recommend a plan of action and a road map.
6. To consult other organisations of civil society such as industry, trade, trade unions, farmers' organisations, women's organisations and students' organisations on the aforesaid matters and elicit their views with specific reference to the all round development of the different regions of the State.
7. To make any other suggestion or recommendation that the Committee may deem appropriate.

== Reactions ==
Telangana Rashtra Samithi
February 2010: TRS president K Chandrasekhar Rao called the terms of reference as "baseless, meaningless"

Praja Rajyam
December 2010: Party president Chiranjeevi said he would stick to Srikrishna Committee report on Telangana.

== Options suggested ==
The Sri Krishna Committee submitted a comprehensive 461-page report after their detailed across the state which included consultations with various political as well as social groups.

The committee's report suggested 6 options of which options 1 through 4 were advised to be not feasible. The Fifth option is to bifurcate the State into Telangana with Hyderabad as its capital and Seemandhra which is to have a new capital city. The Committee noted that "Separation is recommended only in case it is unavoidable and if this decision can be reached amicably amongst all the three regions." (Page 454) The Sixth and the option that the Committee recommended as the "way forward" is to keep the state and "establishment of a statutory and empowered Telangana Regional Council with adequate transfer of funds, functions and functionaries in keeping with the spirit of Gentlemen's Agreement of 1956" (Page 454)

The six options presented in the report were as follows:

1. Maintaining Status Quo – Keeping the Andhra Pradesh State as it is with no change in the Telangana, Rayalaseema and Coastal Andhra regions.
2. Bifurcating the state of Andhra Pradesh into Seemandhra and Telangana regions with both of them developing their own capitals in due course of time. Hyderabad to be converted to a Union territory – This proposal was similar to the Punjab-Haryana-Chandigarh model.
3. Dividing Andhra Pradesh into two states – One of Rayala-Telangana with Hyderabad as its capital and second one of the Coastal Andhra Pradesh
4. Dividing Andhra Pradesh into Seemandhra and Telangana with enlarged Hyderabad Metropolis as a separate Union territory that will be linked geographically to district Guntur in coastal Andhra via Nalgonda district in the southeast and via Mahboobnagar district in the south to Kurnool district in Rayalaseema
5. Bifurcation of the State into Telangana and Seemandhrac as per existing boundaries with Hyderabad as the capital of Telangana and Seemandhra to have a new capital.
6. Keeping the State united and providing for creation of a statutorily empowered Telangana Regional Council for socio-economic development and political development of Telangana region.

== Findings ==
1. The SKC remarked that "It is a fact that most of the economic and developmental parameters show that Telangana (excluding Hyderabad) is either on par with or a shade lower than coastal Andhra; but once Hyderabad is included, the situation in Telangana is far better." (2.15.03 on Page 119)
2. In comparison with the Rayalaseema region, the SKC remarked that "Thus, on the whole, it would appear that the deprived region is Rayalaseema not Telangana" (2.15.03 on Page 119)
3. Overall, in spite of 50-plus years of policy protected planning and execution, one finds regional variations in the economic development of AP. The rate of growth in the development parameters summed up below is found to be robust both in Telangana (even after excluding Hyderabad) and coastal Andhra. (p. 118).
4. The SKC noted that the Planning Commission had notified as backward nine of the ten Telangana districts, with the exception of Hyderabad, and resources have been allocated under its Backward Region Grant Fund (BRGF). These districts contain, as the SKC says, 87% of the population of Telangana. (p. 81)
5. Considering the allegation that "Telangana has lower per capita income, lower access to employment, lower business opportunities and low access to education and so on", SKC says, "At the outset, some or all such allegations appear true when absolute amounts, numbers and percentages are reviewed" (p. 117).
6. "The implementation of G.O. 610 during 1975 to 2005 was, at best, tardy, which remains a grievance of Telangana employees. This issue continues to be highly contentious even today (p.48)." Girglani Report on GO. 610 estimated 140,000 Telangana jobs diverted to Seemandhra persons. However SKC noted in para 5.29.01, only 18,856 employees are identified in total by Girglani commission and 14,784 employees are already repatriated to their native Zones. Most of the violations are in education and health departments due to shortage of qualified people from the local zones. There are also violations from zone 6 to zone 5 and vice versa which are part of Telangana area.
7. "However, the data received from the State Government shows (Appendix 3.16) that the combined amount released to government and aided colleges together is Rs. 930 million in Telangana while it is 2.24 billion in coastal Andhra (with college-going population similar to that in Telangana) and 910 million in Rayalaseema (with population share being less than half that in Telangana)" (p. 153).
8. "The real income of the agricultural wage labourers has declined considerably in Telangana whereas it has increased considerably in coastal Andhra region. Similarly, the SCs, STs and minorities in Telangana region have suffered a decline in income during the past about decade or more, whereas these communities have gained substantially in Coastal Andhra (p.119)".
9. "Although as a sub-regional movement, the Telangana movement does not pose a threat to national unity" (p. 344).
10. "The Telangana movement can be interpreted as a desire for greater democracy and empowerment within a political unit. As stated earlier, sub-regionalism is a movement, which is not necessarily primordial but is essentially modern – in the direction of a balanced and equitable modernisation. Our analysis shows that cutting across caste, religion, gender and other divisions, the Telangana movement brings a focus on the development of the region as a whole, a focus on rights and access to regional resources and, further, it pitches for a rights-based development perspective whereby groups and communities put forth their agendas within a larger vision of equitable development" (p. 415).
11. "However, given the long-standing history of the demand for a separate State, the deep penetration of the sense of grievance and the widespread emotion around the issue, unless genuine steps are taken to address both real and perceived disparities, the demand is unlikely to go away permanently even if it is subdued temporarily" (p. 417).
12. "Thus, from the point of view of sheer size of economy, Telangana as a new State can sustain itself both with and without Hyderabad. The other combination of regions – coastal Andhra and Rayalaseema together can also sustain themselves as a State; in fact, they can also sustain themselves separately" (p. 121).
13. "In view of the complex background of the situation and the rather serious and sensitive emotional aspects involved, the Committee is of the unanimous view that it would not be practical to simply maintain the status quo in respect of the situation" (p. 442).
14. "Given the above first hand observations of the Committee during its tours of the regions, the Committee feels that the issue of sentiment has to be considered only as one among several factors to be evaluated. While not discounting people's wishes or sentiments, the overall implications of bifurcation (or trifurcation as the case may be) have to be carefully delineated to arrive at a responsible recommendation"(p. 352–353).
15. "The Committee is of the view that given the long history of the demand for a separate Telangana, the highly charged emotions at present and the likelihood of the agitation continuing in case the demand is not met (unless handled deftly, tactfully and firmly as discussed under option six), consideration has to be given to this option. The grievances of the people of Telangana, such as non-implementation of some of the key decisions included in the Gentleman's Agreement (1956), certain amount of neglect in implementation of water and irrigation schemes, inadequate provision for education infrastructure (excluding Hyderabad), and the undue delay in the implementation of the Presidential order on public employment, etc., have contributed to the felt psyche of discrimination and domination, with the issue attaining an emotional pitch. The continuing demand, therefore, for a separate Telangana, the Committee felt, has some merit and is not entirely unjustified" (p. 453).
16. "Therefore, after taking into account all the pros and cons, the Committee did not think it to be the most preferred, but the second best, option. Separation is recommended only in case it is unavoidable and if this decision can be reached amicably amongst all the three regions" (p. 453).
17. The delay in the formation of Telangana will create Political crisis and the Maoist movement is likely to get a fillip in such a situation(page 411)

== Criticism ==
Telangana leaders rejected the recommendations of the Sri Krishna committee report and insisted on the formation of a different Telangana State with Hyderabad as its capital.

Pro-Telangana student protesters set an APSRTC bus and a police vehicle on fire, and broke windowpanes of at least eight buses. They hurled stones, forcing police to use teargas to disperse the mobs. The stone throwing resulted in injuries to many policemen, including an Additional DCP (District Commissioner of Police). Some activists also damaged the statue of Potti Sriramulu at Vanasthalipuram junction in Hyderabad after alleged remarks by Ongole MP on KCR.

Criticism of the Sri Krishna Committee report includes that it compared regions (Seema-Andhra vs Telangana), not people (Seema-Andhrites vs Telanganites). The State government did not or could not provide all the data the committee asked for; they had only 10 years worth of data.

The Telangana JAC steering committee, comprising experts from different fields, studied the Sri Krishana Committee report and came to the conclusion that the report was a " bunch of lies", while proponents of the United State Movement, including Samaikhya Andhra JAC and the Praja Rajyam party, welcomed the recommendations of the committee.

Economist and former Planning Commission member C. H. Hanumantha Rao said that the Srikrishna Committee's recommendations are at variance with its own analysis. He said the committee did not study the reasons for the failures of earlier protections, and how future protections will do justice to Telangana. He said that even while the committee's own analysis and data supports the formation of an independent Telangana, it only recommended this as the second-best option.

Protests in Telangana continue in the form of strikes, hunger strikes, suicides, giving petitions and roses to public officials, and the boycotting of public events. The state government's RacchaBanda program (which promises social benefits for everyone) in Telangana has been obstructed by protesters and had to be conducted by using the police, who used preventative arrests and other measures. In some areas, the programme had to be cancelled due to uncontrollable protests. Telangana proponents boycotted this program, saying it was intended to dilute the pro-Telangana agitation. KCR, in a meeting in Hyderabad, said "Sherwani, qubani (a sweet made of dates) and biryani are what we in Hyderabad have known for ages. People from Andhra who came here without even footwear are claiming that they have taught us how to make biryani" and allegedly remarked that Andhra Biryani tasted like cow dung. This triggered protests across the state.

A movie called Jai Bolo Telangana based on the Telangana movement received censor clearance only after protests by Telangana supporters.

Journalist Kuldip Nayar said that if the state is divided, development will take a back seat. He remarked that Andhra Pradesh could achieve rapid economic growth only if it remains united. Yoga guru Baba Ramdev supported the demand for a separate Telangana state and warned the centre that the movement may turn violent if there is a delay in the formation of the state. Another Hindu guru, Chinna Jeeyar Swamy, supported the Telangana demand when his stance was sought by some students.

== 8th Chapter of Sri Krishna committee Report ==
In January, a petition was filed pleading to declare the Committee Report as 'invalid' since it did not make public the contents of the eighth chapter of its report, which deals with the law and order situation. The Attorney General of India arguing the case said that the Report was only a committee submitting its advice and the Union government was not obliged to act on its recommendation. The central government submitted that the contents would not be made public since it was a privileged document under Sections 123 and 124 of the Indian Evidence Act of 1872. On 17 February, the justice hearing this case said "It is unfortunate that this report and its related exercise was presided over by a former judge of the Supreme Court... this committee has spent Rs 400 million of public money for preparing its report. Any person with a semblance of faith in the system of democracy would lose faith in it. The report prepared by the front office of an MP would have been more sensible than this report. Even the high command of a political party would have hesitated to prepare such a report"

On 23 March, Justice L Narasimha Reddy of Andhra Pradesh high court ordered central government to make public the contents of 8th chapter of Sri Krishna Committee, which was submitted in a sealed secret cover to the centre. Justice in his 60 page judgement said "The Committee went beyond the terms of reference in its endeavour to persuade the Union of India not to accede to the demand for Telangana". SKC secret report as quoted in paras 68–72, argued against Telangana state while discussing communal violence, Maoist violence and social tensions. The supplementary note to secret report has three parts, ..

- "a) Political management: Action also needs to be initiated for softening the TRS to the extent possible .. Inputs indicate that this agitation can be tackled if Congress Leaders do not give an impression indicating any covert / overt support to it. Hence the Congress MPs / MLAs need to be taken into confidence and asked not to lend any form of support to the agitation. The Congress High Command must sensitise its own MPs and MLAs and educate them about the wisdom for arriving at an acceptable and workable solution. With the ruling party and main opposition party (for Telangana demand) being brought on the same page, the support mechanisms have a higher probability of becoming successful."(para 75)
- "b) Media Management: ..Andhra Pradesh has got about 13 Electronic Channels and 5 major local Newspapers which are in the forefront of moulding the public opinion. Except for two Channels (Raj News & hmtv), the rest of them are supporters of a united Andhra Pradesh. The equity holders of the channels except the above two and the entire Print Media are with the Seemandhra people. The main editors/resident and sub-editors, the Film world etc. are dominated by Seemandhra people. A coordinated action on their part has the potential of shaping the perception of the common man. ..In the Print Media all major Newspapers are owned by Seemandhra people and the Regional contents published by them play a vital role. .. The editorial opinions, the banner headlines, the Regional content, the District editions need to be managed .." (para 80). "The print media is hugely dependent on the Government for advertisement revenue and if carefully handled can be an effective tool to achieve this goal". (para 91)
- c) Full preparedness: As under each of the options there is a high possibility of agitational backlash, notwithstanding the actions taken in advance as suggested in (a) and (b) above, an appropriate plan of deployment grid of police force (both Central and State) with full technical support needs to be immediately drawn up. ..The likely troubled spots (e.g. Osmania, Kakatiya, Krishna Devraya Universities etc.) and the trouble creators in the three regions must be identified in advance and suitable action plan prepared. In my discussions with Chief Secretary and DGP, the kind of equipment and weaponry to be used were also discussed and it was agreed that weaponry used should be such as not to cause fatal injuries, while at the same time effective enough to bring the agitationists quickly under control. "(para 94)

Justice said (in para 96) "If the committee has suggested use of arsenal of lesser degree, it is not because there is any pity or sympathy towards the agitators. Obviously, it is to avoid the wrath of the human rights agencies". The justice further said(in para 103) "The maneuver suggested by the Committee in its secret supplementary note poses an open challenge, if not threat, to the very system of democracy. If the source of inputs that gave rise to this is the Government, it (the Government) owes an explanation to the citizens. If, on the other hand, the origin of inputs is elsewhere, the Government must move in the right earnest to pluck and eradicate such foul source and thereby prove its respect for, and confidence in, the democracy." Telangana JAC and Telangana leaders from all political parties demanded prosecution of Sri Krishna Committee members.

On 26 April, a division bench comprising the Chief Justice of the AP high court has stayed the order of Justice L Narasimha Reddy who had directed the centre to make public the secret Chapter.

Preceded by 2004-2010 Telangana protests	Telangana movement Srikrishna committee's involvement	Succeeded by Early 2011 Telangana protests
