= Jayanth Manda =

Jayanth Manda (born 1939, Hyderabad, Andhra Pradesh) is a contemporary Indian artist.

Jayanth Manda

== Biography ==
After preliminary practice in the art of drawing and painting at local schools, he joined Sir J. J. School of Art, Mumbai and obtained Diploma in Painting in 1964. Studied Mural techniques at faculty of Fine Arts, M. S. University, Baroda, in 1967 under the guidance of Professor K.G. Subrahmanyam.

He has held many solo exhibitions and participated in group exhibitions at all the major cities of India. He was an active member of DISHA - a creative artists group which projected the contemporary social situation in India. He joined Doordarshan Kendra, Hyderabad in 1972. He was trained at Film and Institute of India FTII, Pune in 1976 and 1982 in the field of "Film and Television Programme Production Techniques", became trained Television Producer and continued working for Doordarshan Kendra and retired as Assistant Station Director, Doordarshan Kendra in 1996.

He was conferred Doctorate in "Television Communication and role of Indian Culture" in 2003, Osmania University Hyderabad.

At present he is practicing as a professional painter.

re-echo

== Exhibitions ==
- First One Man Show at USIS, Hyderabad. 1964
- Second One Man who at Ajanta Pavilion, Hyderabad, 1965
- Group Show FRIENDS at New Delhi 1966
- Group Show held at Kalabhavan, Hyderabad in 1969
- Group Show held at Film & Television Institute, Pune
- Third One Man show at Kalabhavan, Hyderabad in 1981
- Hyderabad Art Society - Members Painting Workshop 2008
- Department of Culture - A.P. Senior Artists Painting Workshop 2008
- Senior Artists of India - Painting Workshop 2008

== Awards ==
- First Prize Annual Art Exhibition, Hyderabad Art Society
- First Prize from AP Lalit Kala Akademi
- First Prize from Bharat Kala Parishath
- Outstanding Award from Bharat Kala Parishath
- Award from All India fine Arts & Crafts society, New Delhi, 2003
- University, Annual State Level Art Exhibition, 2002.
- "Prathiba Puraskar" from Potti Sriramulu Telugu University, A.P - 2005
- "Bharath Excellence Award & Gold medal" - Friendship Forum of India - 2008
- "Rashtriya Jewel Award & Gold medal" - Friendship Forum of India - 2008
