= Kakani Venkata Ratnam =

Indian politician (1900–1972

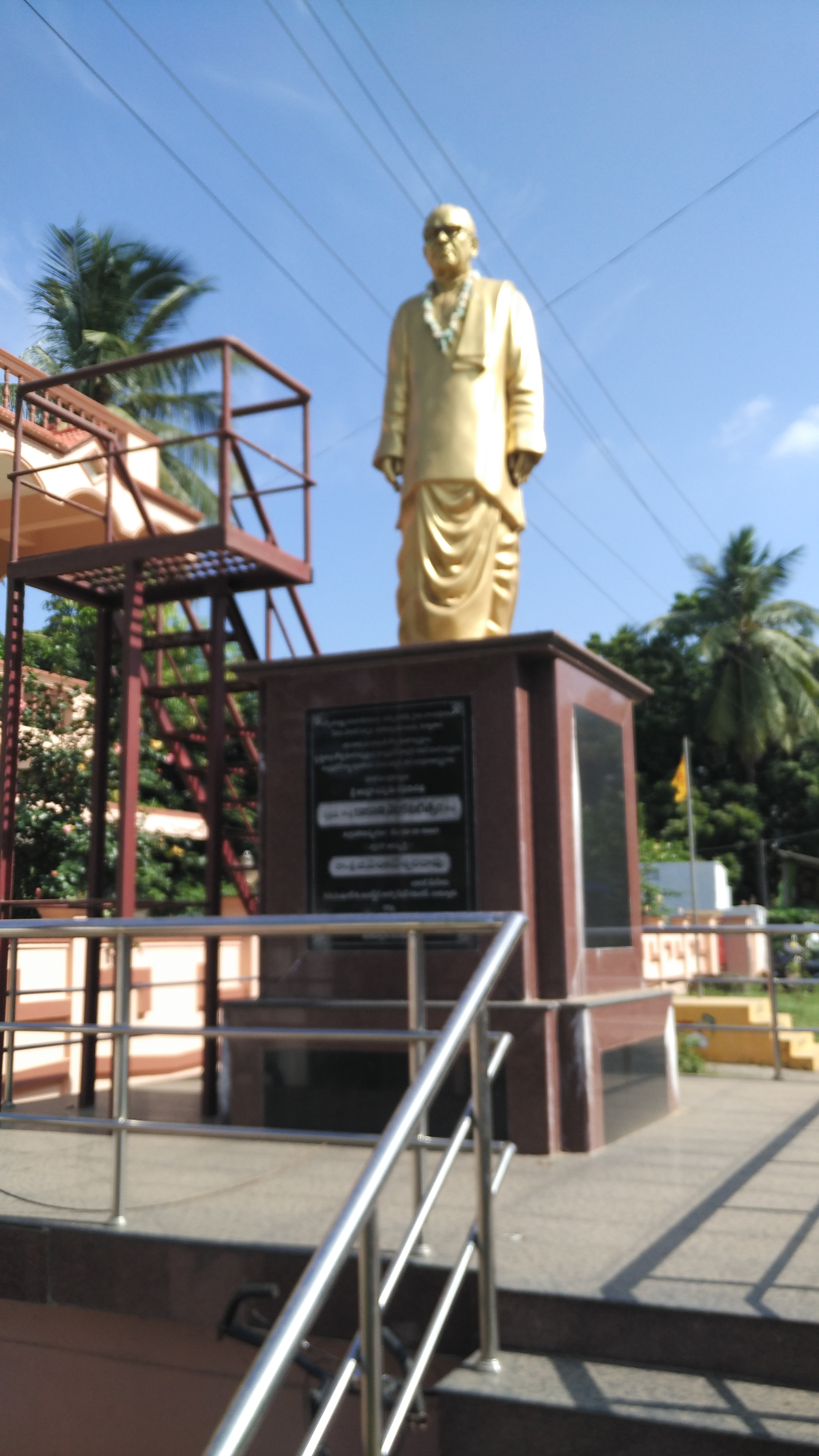
- Statue of Venkata Ratnam at Akunuru, Krishna district in Andhra Pradesh

Minister for Agriculture and Dairy development
- In office 1968–1972

Member of Legislative Assembly, Andhra Pradesh
- In office 1972–1978
- Preceded by: V. R. Kadiyala
- Succeeded by: Vadde Sobhanadreeswara Rao
- Constituency: Vuyyur
- In office 1968–1972
- Preceded by: V. Seetha Ramayya
- Succeeded by: T. S. Anand Babu
- Constituency: Gannavaram
- In office 1962–1967
- Preceded by: Office established
- Succeeded by: V. R. Kadiyala
- Constituency: Vuyyur

Member of Legislative Assembly, Andhra State
- In office 1955–1962
- Preceded by: Office established
- Succeeded by: Office abolished
- Constituency: Vuyyur

Personal details
- Born: 3 August 1900 Akunuru, Krishna district, Andhra Pradesh
- Died: 25 December 1972 (aged 72)
- Party: Indian National Congress

Kakani Venkata Ratnam was an Indian politician from Andhra Pradesh who served as a cabinet minister for Agriculture and Dairy development.

== Life ==
He was born in Akunuru, Krishna district of Andhra Pradesh,, where he was educated up to primary level. He learned Sanskrit and Hindi languages from a tutor at a neighbouring village, Kunderu. He was attracted to the then freedom struggle movement started by Mahatma Gandhi. As a student youth leader he mobilised youth to join the movement along with others including Pidikiti Madhava Rao, Rebala Buchi Ramaiah Shresty, Kalapala Surya Prakash Rao and Peta Brahmaiah. They organised a meeting at Vijayawada in 1923 which was addressed by Gandhi and later the place was named Gandhi Nagar municipal grounds. He worked in support of the Khadi movement too. Gandhi also visited Akunuru and spent the night he spent at Vuyyuru. Ratnam accompanied Gandhi in his tour programme which stretched up to Mudunuru. Gradually, he became a popular Congress leader and chairman of the Krishna district Congress committee for a long duration.

He was elected for legislative assembly and won three times as Member of legislative assembly in 1962, 1967 and 1972.

He died of a heart attack on 25 December 1972 at the height of the Jai Andhra movement. His sudden death subsided the Jai Andhra movement.

There is a statue commemorating Ratnam in the Benz circle of Vijayawada. There is also a library in his name in Vijayawada on Bandar Road and a marriage function hall in Hanuman Junction. His also has statues in Vizag and the Tanuku Andhra Sugar factory.

His death was on the same day as India's ex-Governor General of India, C. Rajagaoplachary's. His death ceremony was performed with state rituals attended by the then prime minister and other national leaders.
