= Gentlemen's Agreement of 1956 =

Indian political accord

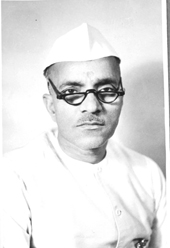
K.V. Ranga Reddy written Gentlemen's Agreement in his autobiography

The Gentlemen's agreement of Andhra Pradesh was signed between Telangana and Andhra leaders before the formation of the state of Andhra Pradesh of India on 20 February 1956. The agreement provided safeguards with the purpose of preventing discrimination against Telangana by the government of Andhra Pradesh. The violations of this agreement are cited as one of the reasons for formation of separate statehood for Telangana.

== Background ==
The Gentlemen's agreement of Andhra Pradesh has a precedent in the Sri Bagh Pact of 1937 which was between the leaders of Rayalaseema and Coastal Telugu speaking districts of Madras State to provide assurances for Rayalaseema in return for their willingness to join Andhra State. This unbinding pact was largely forgotten probably because of the large political representation the region has had in the state governments since independence.

When the Hyderabad State led by the Nizam of Hyderabad was merged by India in Operation Polo, there was a debate in the Telugu-speaking districts of the Hyderabad State (1948–56) (also known as Telangana), on whether to join the newly formed Andhra State, carved out of Telugu speaking districts of Madras state

The States Reorganisation Commission (SRC), in 1955, recommended that "the Telangana area is to constitute into a separate State, which may be known as the Hyderabad State with provision for its unification with Andhra after the general elections likely to be held in or about 1961 if by a two thirds majority the legislature of the residency Hyderabad State expresses itself in favor of such unification".

=== Opposition to the merger ===
Hyderabad Chief minister in his letter to the Congress President said that Communist parties supported the merger for their political calculations. Hyderabad PCC chief said overwhelming majority from Congress party opposed the merger and Communists were elected in special circumstances in 1951 and Visalandhra was not a political issue in 1951 and Assembly does not reflect people's view on this issue. He also said 80% of Congress delegates who were elected in 1955 opposed merger. Government had to provide the additional security for Communist leaders who supported the Visalandhra. The locals agitated against the non-locals in 1952 Mulki Agitation.

In Hyderabad assembly out of 174 MLAs On 3 December 1955, 147 MLAs expressed their view. 103 MLA's (including Marathi and Kannada MLAs) supported the merger, 16 MLAs maintained neutral stand and 29 opposed merger. Among Telangana MLAs, 25 Telangana MLAs disagreed with the merger, 59 Telangana MLAs supported the merger. Out of 94 Telangana MLAs in the assembly, 36 were Communists(PDF), 40 were Congress, 11 were Socialist party(SP), 9 were independents. Voting did not take place on the resolution because Telangana proponents insisted on to including the phrase "As per the wishes of people" in the resolution.

To convince the leadership of Telangana to join the new state, an agreement was reached between the leaders of both sides on 20 February 1956. This came to be known as the Gentlemen's agreement, allowed the formation of the state of Andhra Pradesh in 1956, against the SRC's recommendations.

== Key points of the agreement ==
1.Expenditure on Administration was to be borne proportionately by the two regions and surplus revenue from telangana region would be spent only for the development of telangana.

2. For the more convenient transaction of the business of Government with regard to some specified matters the Telangana area will be treated as one region.

3. For the Telangana region there will be a Regional Standing Committee of the state assembly consisting of the members of the State Assembly belonging to that region including the Ministers from that region but not including the Chief Minister.

4. Legislation relating to specified matters will be referred to the Regional committee. In respect of specified matters proposals may also be made by the Regional Committee to the State Government for legislation or with regard to the question of general policy not involving any financial commitments other than expenditure of a routine and incidental character.

5. The advice tendered by the Regional Committee will normally be accepted by the Government and the State Legislature. In case of difference of opinion, reference will be made to the Governor whose decision will be binding.

6. The Regional Committee will deal with following matters:

i) Development and economic planning within the framework of the general development plans formulated by the State Legislature.

ii) Local Self Government, that is to say, the Constitutional powers of Municipal Corporations, Improvement Trusts, District Boards and district authorities for the purpose of Local Self Government or Village Administration.

iii) Public health and sanitation, local hospitals and dispensaries.

iv) Primary and secondary education.

v) Regulation of admission to the educational institutions in the Telangana region.

vi) Prohibition

vii) Sale of agricultural lands.

viii) Cottage and small scale Industries, and

ix) Agriculture, Cooperative Societies, Markets and Fairs.

Unless revised by agreement earlier this arrangement will be reviewed after ten years.

B. Domicile Rules : Telangana is regarded as a unit as far as recruitment to subordinate services is concerned; posts borne on the cadre of these services may be reserved for being filled up by persons who satisfy the domicile conditions as prescribed under the existing Hyderabad Mulki Rules. (15 years of Stay in Telangana area and in written document (affidavit) saying that he/she won't leave Telangana)

C. The position of Urdu. The Government of India would advise the state Government to take appropriate steps to ensure that the existing position of Urdu in administrative and judicial structure of the State is maintained for a period of five years.

D. Retrenchment of surplus personnel in the new State. The Government of India do not anticipate any retrenchment. The intention is that so far as possible, the service personnel from the Hyderabad State should be automatically integrated into the services of the Andhra Pradesh without any process of screening. Should, however, any retrenchment be found necessary, the entire personnel of the services of the enlarged State will be treated on equal footing.

E. Distribution of expenditure between Telangana and Andhra Regions. Allocation of expenditure with the resources of the state is a matter which falls within the purview of the State Government and the State Legislature. Since, however, it has been agreed to the representatives of Andhra and Telangana that the expenditure of the new state on central and general administration should be borne proportionately by the two regions and the balance of income should be reserved for expenditure on the development of Telangana area, it is open to the state government to act in accordance with the terms of agreement in making budgetary allocations. The Government of India propose to invite the attention of the Chief Minister of Andhra to this particular understanding and to express the hope that it will be implemented.

F. The existing educational facilities including Technical Education in Telangana should be secured to the students of Telangana and further improved---

G. The cabinet will consist of members in proportion of 60:40 percent for Andhra and Telangana respectively, out of 40% of Telangana ministers, one will be a Muslim from Telangana. If the Chief Minister is from one region the other region should be given Deputy Chief Ministership.

=== Signatories ===
Andhra region	Telangana Region
B. Gopal Reddy; Chief Minister, Andhra State	B. Rama Krishna Rao; Chief Minister, Hyderabad state
N. Sanjeeva Reddy	K.V. Ranga Reddy
Gouthu Latchanna	M. Chenna Reddy
Alluri Satyanarayana Raju	J.V. Narsing Rao

== See also ==
- Telangana movement
- History of the Telangana movement
- 1969 Telangana Agitation
- 1972 Jai Andhra movement
