= Jai Andhra movement =

1972 agitation for separate Andhra state

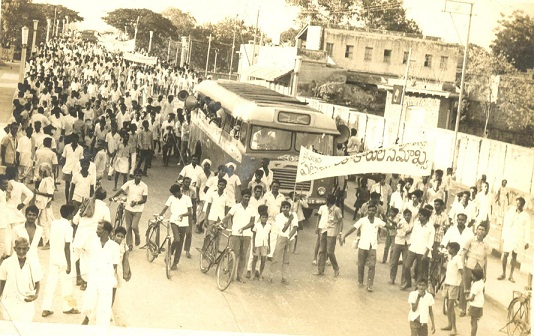
Jai andhra movement-guntur-krishnasuryakumar

Jai Andhra movement is a 1972 political movement in support for the creation of Andhra state in the light of injustices felt by the people of the Coastal Andhra and Rayalaseema Regions. This was after the Andhra Pradesh High Court and Supreme Court of India upheld the Mulki rules in existence at the time. This disenfranchised a vast majority of the population of the state from obtaining jobs in their own state capital. In ensuing protests and police firing eight people were killed. Prominent leaders from Andhra Pradesh: Tenneti Viswanadham, Raja Sagi Suryanarayana Raju, Gouthu Latchanna, Jupudi Yegnanarayana, N. Srinivasulu Reddy, B. V. Subba Reddy, Kakani Venkataratnam, Vasantha Nageswara Rao, M. Venkaiah Naidu, Nissankararao Ventakaratnam, Chowdary Satyanarayana, prominent student leaders like K.Sreedhar Rao, and Haribabu from Andhra University, M.S. Raju from Andhra Medical College, and many others participated in the agitation. It was a sequel to the 1969 Telangana movement. Over 400 people sacrificed their lives for the movement. One of the main opinions expressed was "Development is seen only in and around Hyderabad and it is time the coastal districts also develop rapidly".

== Grievances of the Andhra Regions ==
People from the Andhra and Rayalaseema regions felt that Mulki rules were unfair to them and they were "being treated like aliens in their own land". The agitators, most of whom were students, felt that the Mulki rules in place were unjust, unfortunate and further deepened the rift between Telangana and other regions. The proponents of separate Andhra Pradesh viewed their demand as logical in light of the separate Telangana movement.

== The movement ==
Under the Mulki rules in force at the time, anyone who had lived in Hyderabad for 15 years was considered a local, and was thus eligible for certain government posts. When the Supreme Court upheld the Mulki rules at the end of 1972, the Jai Andhra movement, with the aim of re-forming a separate state of Andhra, was started in Coastal Andhra and Rayalaseema regions.

In 1972, Gouthu Latchanna took a leading role in the Jai Andhra movement started by students of Andhra University demanding the division of Andhra Pradesh into old Andhra state and Telangana state on the issue of "Mulki" rules. He was imprisoned in Mushirabad Central Jail and released in 1973. All the ministers hailing from the Andhra region in the PV Narasimha Rao Govt. resigned, and formed a parallel Government with Vijayawada as the Capital. BV Subba Reddy was elected as the Chief Minister and Kakani Venkataratnam was the Deputy CM. The parallel govt was run for a few months, even after the PV Narasimha Rao Govt. was replaced by President's rule. The movement subsided only after Indira Gandhi came up with the 6-point formula to resolve the crisis to everyone's satisfaction.

== Police firing ==
Thirteen people were killed in 3 places in Andhra on 21 November during the bandh call given by student body. In the police firing eight people were killed on 23 December in Vijayawada. Kakani Venkataratnam, a former minister, died of shock at the height of separate Andhra agitation on 25 December 1972.

== Aftermath ==
Removal of Mulki rules and all other demands were met and a six-point formula was put in place.

After nine ministers from Seemandhra region in the P. V. Narasimha Rao cabinet resigned, he had to resign as Chief minister of Andhra Pradesh on 10 January 1973, and President's rule was imposed in the state.
