= Konda Laxman Bapuji =

Indian politician (1915–2012)

Konda Lakshman Bapuji
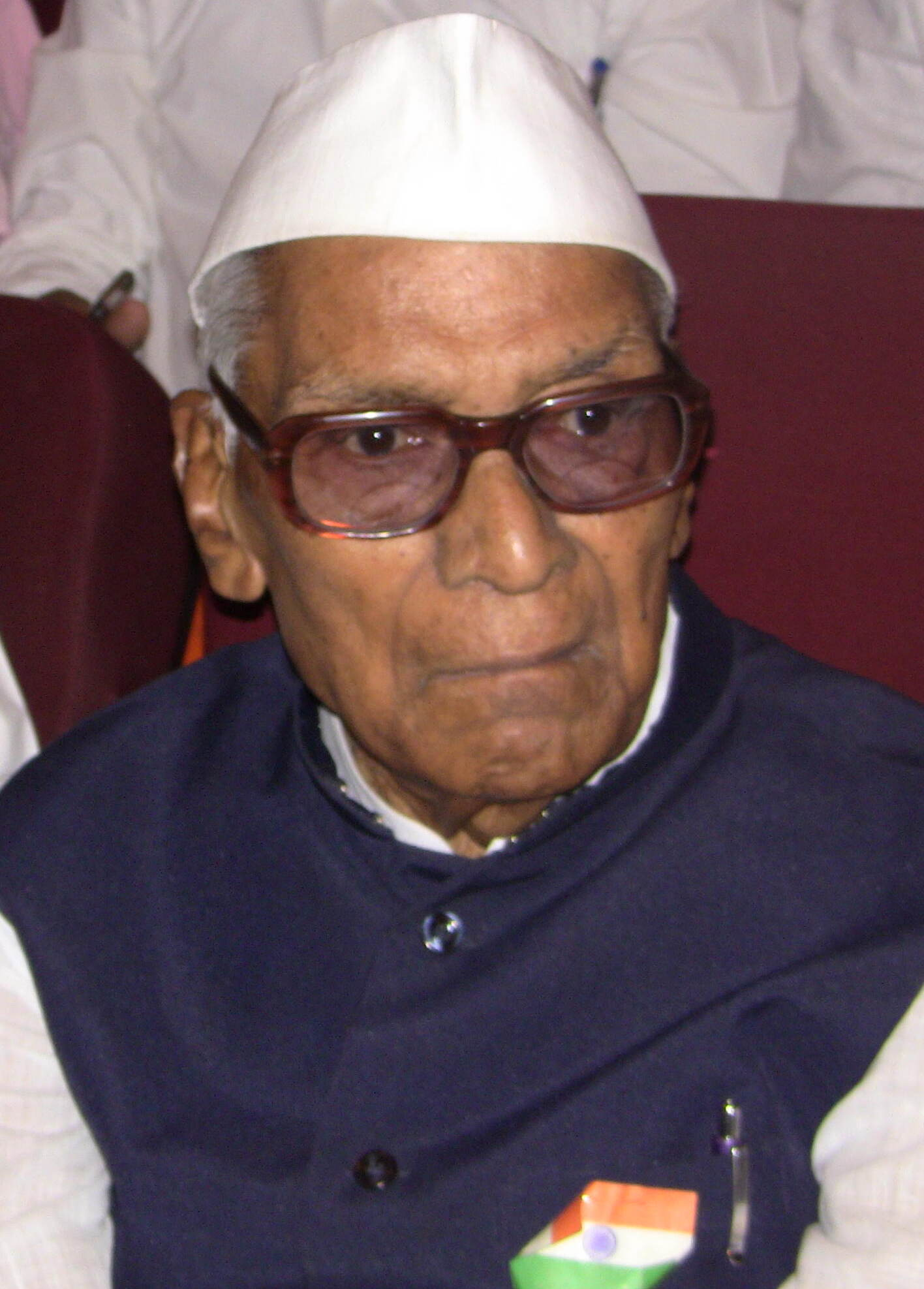
- Father of Telangana

Personal details
- Born: 27 September 1915 Wankidi, Asifabad district, Telangana State
- Died: 21 September 2012 (aged 96) Hyderabad, Andhra Pradesh
- Spouse: Dr. Konda Shakunthala Devi
- Children: 2 sons & 1 daughter
- Website: www.kondalaxmanbapuji.com

Konda Laxman Bapuji (27 September 1915 – 21 September 2012) was an Indian freedom fighter who participated in the Telangana Rebellion and Telangana activist. He fought for the statehood of Telangana all his life.

== Early life ==
Bapuji was born in Wankidi village, Komaram Bheem district, Hyderabad State (now in Telangana) in a Padmashali community.

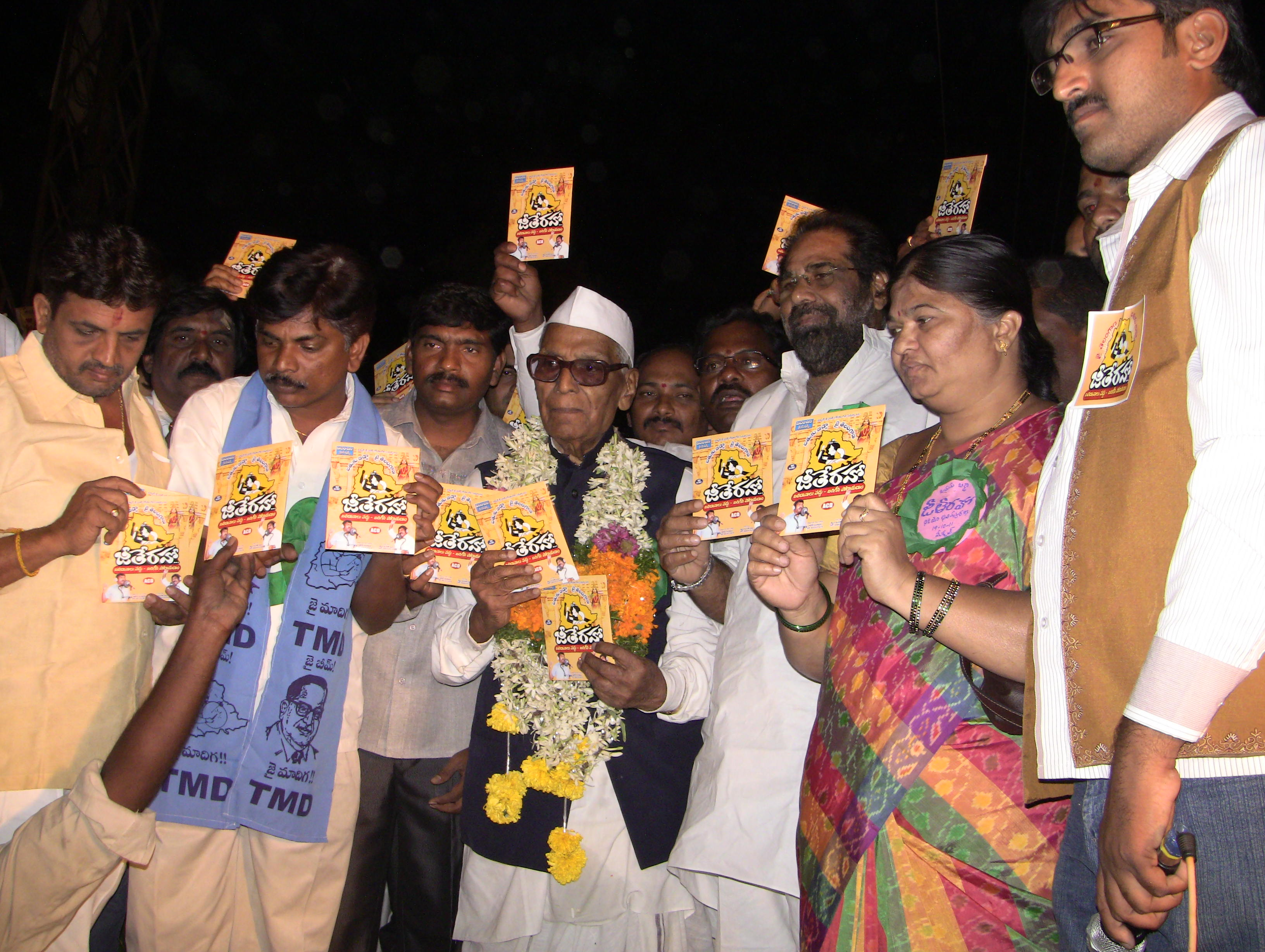
Konda Lakshman Bapuji in a book release during Telangana Agitation

Konda Laxman Bapuji at Tank Bund

== Career ==
Bapuji met Mahatma Gandhi in 1941 and inspired by him, he participated in the Quit India movement in 1942.

He also waged battle against the Nizam and the Razaakars during the Telangana armed struggle in 1947–48.

=== Telangana movement (1952 - 1969) ===
He participated in the 1952 Non-mulki agitation. He was the first minister in Congress government to resign from his post for Telangana cause on 29 March 1969, and then participated to give impetus to the 1969 Telangana Agitation.

=== Political life ===
He was first elected as MLA from Asifabad constituency in 1952. In 1957, Asifabad became a reserved constituency, so he shifted to Nalgonda district which had large number of Padmashali population. He won from Chinna Kondur (later renamed as Bhongir) constituency in 1957 and served as deputy speaker from 1957 to 1960 and as minister from 1960 to 1962.

He unsuccessfully contested as MLA from Munugodu constituency in 1962 but later on served as MLA and minister (1967–69) for two terms from Bhongir assembly constituency (1967–72, 1972–78).

Because of his capabilities, straightforward nature and the clean image he was frontrunner for the CM post on two occasions. It was a well-known fact that due to caste equation and internal politics within the Congress he missed the bus. Unhappy with the former Prime Minister Rajiv Gandhi's opposition to the Mandal commission recommendations, he resigned from the primary membership of the Congress in 1987.

=== Telangana movement (2008 - 2012) ===
He was a member of Telangana Sadhana Samithi. He announced, "We solemnly declare statehood for Telangana on November 2, 2008."

Unlike most leaders from Telangana region, Konda Lakshman Bapuji had the courage to sacrifice and remained out of power for four decades to achieve Telangana statehood.

He was instrumental in forming Akhila Bharat padmashali sangam at Hyderabad.

== Honour ==
In 2014, the horticulture university in Hyderabad was named, Sri Konda Laxman Telangana State Horticultural University, by the Government of Telangana in his honour.

His birthday is celebrated officially by the government of Telangana.

== Death ==
He died on 21 September 2012 at his residence, Jala Dhrushyam, in Hyderabad.

== Personal life ==
He was married to Shankuntala Devi and has two sons and a daughter.
