= 1952 Mulkhi Agitation (Telangana) =

Agitation in India

The 1952 Mulki Agitation or Mulki Agitation was a political movement for the safeguarding of jobs in Hyderabad State government for native residents, or Mulkis. It was the first event in Telangana Movement in India. The agitation lasted between July 26 to mid-September, 1952.

== History ==
The 1952 Mulki agitation which started with the teachers transfer in Warangal, spread to Hyderabad where it intensified and finally resulted in the most important event of the agitation – the City College Incident.

After the annexation of Hyderabad to India, the administration was under Military Governor, J. N. Chaudhuri. There was a large scale recruitment in the Hyderabad State Government, but the non-local new recruits occupied positions meant for the locals under the Mulki rules provided by the erstwhile ruler, the Nizam of Hyderabad. There was widespread discontentment among the locals which led to the agitation.

== The agitation and its consequences ==
In 1952, students led an agitation against non Mulkis or non locals (mulki meaning locals). The popular slogans were Ghair Mulki go back or Non-Mulki go back.

The details of the agitation in Hyderabad and its consequences are given below:

On 29 August 1952, in protest of the lathi charge in Hanamkonda High School, students in Hyderabad organised a rally from Saifabad college. The number of rallies and protests in Hyderabad increased over the next 2 to 3 days.

On 1 September 1952, the then Police commissioner of Hyderabad, Shiva Kumar Lal of Hyderabad Civil Services requested the parents and teachers to stop the students from getting involved in any violence through a public announcement. He also issued a warning that any violence would be dealt with serious police action.

On 2 September 1952, massive rallies were organised across the state in which the students raised the following slogans:

1. Non –Mulkis Go Back

2. Idli – Sambar Ghar ko Jao

3. Students Union Zindabad

In certain places the rallies resulted in lathi charge.

On 3 September 1952, the Police Commissioner issued orders prohibiting rallies, meetings and so on.

CITY COLLEGE INCIDENT:

About the college: The Nizam Mahbub Ali Khan, Asaf Jah VI of Hyderabad established the first city school in the name "Madarsa Dar-ul-uloom" as early as 1865, later Nizam Osman Ali Khan, Asaf Jah VII, converted it into a City High School. The school moved into the present grand building in 1921. Intermediate sections (F.A) of Osmania University with 30 students were introduced in 1921 under the supervision of the high school with Urdu as the medium of instruction. In 1929, the school was upgraded to a college and was named as "City College". It became a constituent college of Osmania University.

Date of Incident – 3 September 1952

Students initially gathered to protest against the Warangal incident and later took out a rally which was joined by many commoners. Many politicians including Venkata Swamy, Mulchand Laxminaraya and Konda Laxman Bapuji tried to dissuade the students from taking out a rally but the students were resolvent.

Gradually, the rally became uncontrollable, there was exchange of stones and the police lathi charged the agitators. This resulted in firing in which two people were killed on the spot and two others died later in the hospital. It also resulted in injuries to many police personal and general public.

Names of the people who were killed

1. Mohammad Kasim (died on spot)

2. Shaikh Mahabub (died on spot)

3. Jamaluddin (died in the hospital)

4. Ramulu (died in the hospital)

After the incident, on 4 September 1952, students agitated near the Osmania General Hospital for the bodies. Padmaja Naidu, Jayasurya Naidu and Dr. Vaghdev tried to control the agitation of the students. However delay in handing over the bodies resulted in massive agitations.

While the student were protesting for the bodies, the police secretly buried the bodies near the Mir Alam Tank. On knowing this the CM immediately ordered excavation of these bodies and handing them over to their families.

The entire situation resulted in many protests. Most important of which was the CM's official car was burnt by the agitators. All these incidents led to police firing in which four more people were killed.

Measures taken by the government after City College Incident:-

1. A Cabinet sub-committee was formally announced on 7 September 1952. Members were K.V. Ranga Reddy, Dr. Melkote Phulchand Gandhi and Nawaz Jung Bahadur. Purpose of the committee: To study the Mulki rules and suggest changes and means of effective implementation of the Mulki rules in consultation with the students and other stakeholders.

2. Justice Pingali Jagan Mohan Reddy committee was appointed to investigate into police firing on 3 and 4 September.

== Pingali Jagan Mohan Committee ==
Date of Appointment – 5th Sept 1952

10th Sept 1952 – Govt issued a formal letter mentioning the criteria for investigation.

(i) Situations led to the firing.

(ii) If needed an investigation into the cause of the agitation by the students.

28 December 1952 – Date of submission of the report

Nearly hundred witnesses were cross examined including the following:

1.CM – B Ramakrishna Rao

2.Monappa (Inspector General of Police)

3.Shiva Kumar Lal (Commissioner of Police)

4.Sundaram Pillai (DCP)

5.Subbaiah (Brigadier)

6.Partha Saradi (Hyderabad Collector)

7.Sri Ram Lal (City College Principal)

The Committee concluded that the City College Incident could have been avoided if both the police and students exercised some restraint.

It however, did not hold the police guilty of the action as it felt that the situation demanded stern action by the police.

The appointment of the above two committees marked the end of the 1952 agitation.

Though the agitation did not bring about any major changes in the Mulki rules, it clearly communicated the rejection of the idea of Vishalaandhra by the people of Telangana and their mistrust in the people of Andhra.
