= Visalandhra movement =

Movement in post-independence India

The Visalandhra, Vishalandhra or Vishala Andhra was a movement in post-independence India for a united state for all Telugu speakers, a Greater Andhra (Telugu: విశాలాంధ్ర Viśālāndhra). The movement succeeded and a separate state of Andhra Pradesh was formed by merging Telugu-speaking areas of Hyderabad State (now known as Telangana) with Andhra State on 1 November 1956 as part of the States Reorganisation Act. (Andhra State had been previously carved out of Madras State on 1 October 1953). However, on 2 June 2014, Telangana State was separated back out of Andhra Pradesh and the Vishalandhra experiment came to an end. The residual Andhra Pradesh now has approximately the same borders as the old Andhra State of 1956.

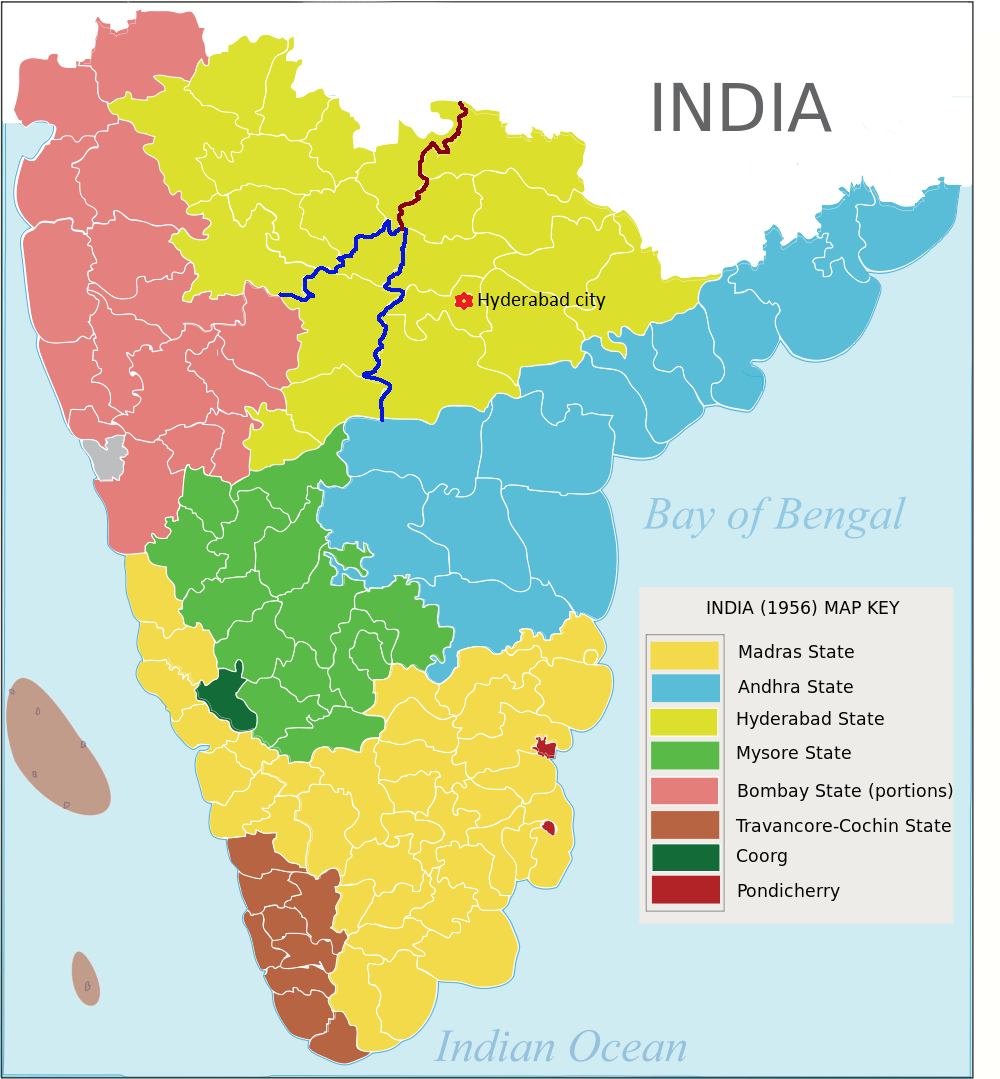
Map of southern India in 1956 with Hyderabad State at the top in yellowish green; after reorganisation in 1956, the area of the state east of the red and blue lines (Telangana) was merged with Andhra State to form Andhra Pradesh state

== Background ==
A States Reorganisation Commission was constituted by the Central Government of India in 1953 to recommend the reorganization of state boundaries. In 1955, after nearly 2 years of study, the commission made a number of recommendations for India's state boundaries. The commission's report judged the arguments for and against the merger of the Telugu-majority Telangana region (of Hyderabad State) and the Andhra State. Paragraph 386 of the report read .."After taking all these factors into consideration we have come to the conclusions that it will be in the interests of Andhra as well as Telangana, if for the present, the Telangana area is to constitute into a separate State, which may be known as the Hyderabad State with provision for its unification with Andhra after the general elections likely to be held in or about 1961 if by a two thirds majority the legislature of the residency Hyderabad State expresses itself in favor of such unification".

The Hyderabad chief minister, Burgula Ramakrishna Rao, in his letter to the Indian National Congress president said Communist parties supported the merger for their political calculations. The Hyderabad PCC chief said overwhelming majority from Congress opposed the merger and Communists were elected in special circumstances in 1951 and Visalandhra was not a political issue in 1951 and Hyderabad Legislative Assembly did not reflect the people's view on this issue. He also said 80% of Congress delegates who were elected in 1955 opposed merger.

Out of 174 MLAs in the Hyderabad Legislative Assembly, 147 MLAs expressed their view. 103 MLAs (including Marathi- and Kannada-speaking MLAs) supported the merger and opposed the commission's recommendation to keep Telangana as a separate State for 5 years; and 29 supported opposed such merger. Among Telangana MLAs, 59 Telangana MLAs agreed with the merger, 25 Telangana MLAs opposed the merger. Out of 94 Telangana MLAs in the assembly, 36 were Communists, 40 were Congress, 11 were Socialists, 9 were independents. Voting did not take place on the resolution because Telangana proponents asked to include the phrase "As per the wishes of people" in the resolution.

== Success ==
An agreement was reached between Telangana leaders and Andhra leaders on 20 February 1956 to merge Telangana and Andhra with promises to safeguard Telangana's interests. A popular newspaper in Telangana, Golkonda Patrika, in an editorial of 8 March 1956, immediately after Indian Prime Minister Jawaharlal Nehru's public declaration about the merger, expressing doubts about the gentleman's agreement said that "Andhra older brother might say any number of sweet things now, but they have to be committed to their promises and they should not exploit Telangana younger brother in future."

Following the Gentlemen's agreement, the central government established a unified Andhra Pradesh on 1 November 1956.

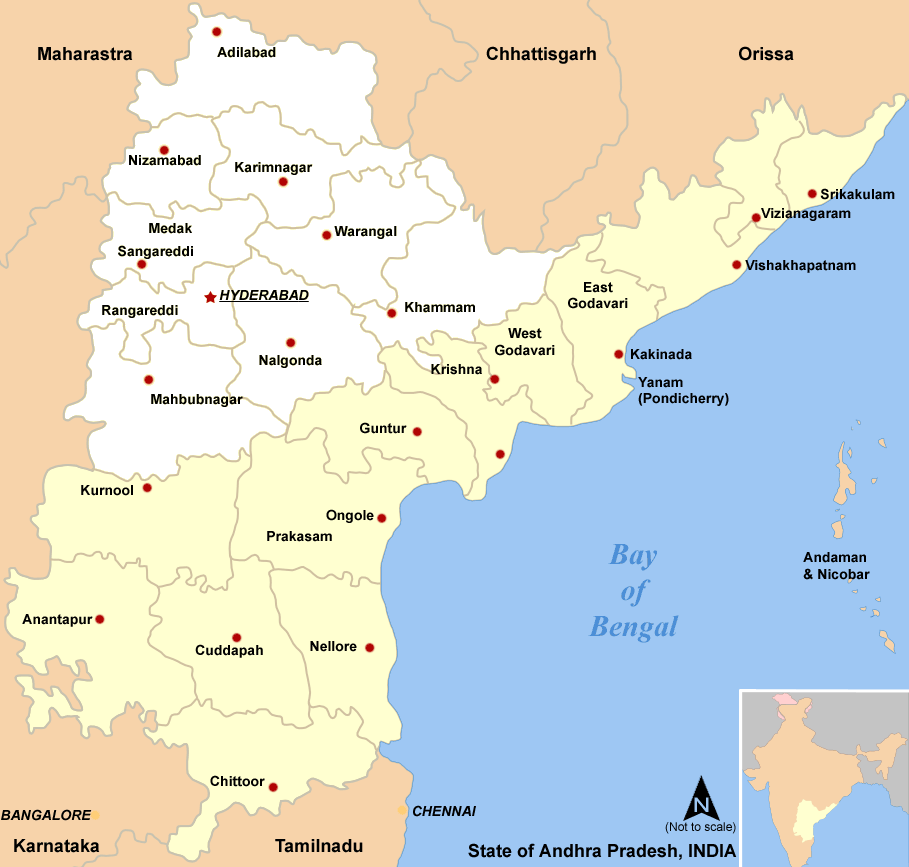
Map of Andhra Pradesh; areas in white were split to form Telangana in 2014

== Aftermath ==
There were subsequently several movements to invalidate the merger of Telangana and Andhra, major ones occurring in 1969, 1972 and 2000s onwards. The Telangana movement gained momentum over decades becoming a widespread political demand of creating a new state from the Telangana region of Andhra Pradesh. In early 2014, the Andhra Pradesh Reorganisation Act, 2014, was approved by the Indian parliament, and Telangana became India's 29th state on 2 June 2014.

== See also ==
- India States Reorganisation Commission Report: Telangana Andhra
- Jai Andhra Movement
- Samaikyandhra Movement
- Telangana Movement
