= Potti Sreeramulu =

Indian activist

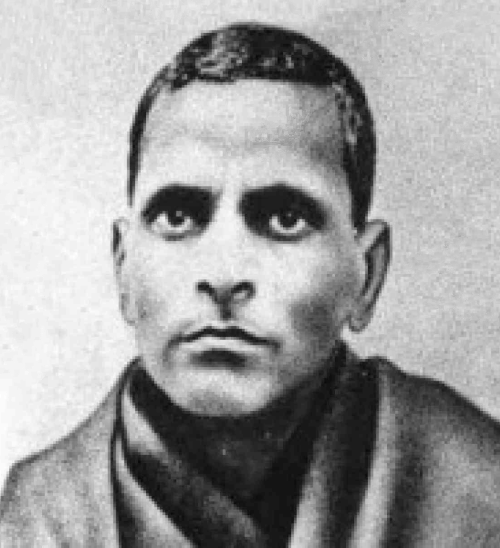
- Born: 16 March 1901; Padamatipalli, Madras Presidency, British India (Now Nellore District, Andhra Pradesh, India)
- Died: 15 December 1952 (aged 51); Madras, Madras State, India (now Chennai, Tamil Nadu, India)
- Cause of death: Fasting - hunger strike
- Resting place: Chennai
- Education: Sanitary Engineering
- Occupations: Engineer, social activist.
- Known for: Hunger strike for a separate state of Andhra.
- Title: Founding Father of Andhra Pradesh
- Parent(s): Guravayya and Mahalakshmamma

Potti Sreeramulu (IAST: Poṭṭi Śrīrāmulu, Telugu pronunciation: ['poʈiː ʃriː'raːmulu]; 16 March 1901 – 15 December 1952) was an Indian freedom fighter known for his pivotal role in the creation of Andhra State. Revered as "Amarajeevi" ("Immortal Being"), he is remembered for his commitment to social justice and the upliftment of Dalits, organizing fasts to advocate for their rights and access to religious sites. Influenced by Mahatma Gandhi, Sreeramulu participated in major independence movements, including the Salt Satyagraha and Quit India movement, and was imprisoned multiple times.

Sreeramulu is most noted for his 58-day hunger strike in 1952, demanding a separate state for Telugu-speaking people from the Madras Presidency. His death during the protest sparked widespread riots and public outcry, prompting Prime Minister Jawaharlal Nehru to announce the formation of Andhra State. This movement set a precedent for the reorganization of states along linguistic lines in India. Sreeramulu's legacy is commemorated in Andhra Pradesh and beyond as a symbol of sacrifice and dedication to regional and social causes.

== Early life ==
Sreeramulu was born in a Telugu Hindu family to Guravayya and Mahalakshmamma in 1901 at Padamatapalli,(Nadikattuvari palli) in modern day Prakasam district. Later, the family shifted to Madras as famine conditions prevailed in this region. They later lived in Nellore, Andhra Pradesh. He completed his high school in Madras and joined the Victoria Jubilee Technical Institute in Bombay to study sanitary engineering. After his college education, Sreeramulu joined the Great Indian Peninsular Railway, Bombay. In 1929, Sreeramulu lost both his wife and his newborn child. Two years later, he resigned from his job and joined Gandhi's Sabarmati Ashram to serve the struggle for Indian Independence.

== Independence Movement and Dalit upliftment ==
Sreeramulu took part in the Indian Independence Movement and was imprisoned for participating in the 1930 Salt Satyagraha. Between 1941 and 1942, he participated in the individual satyagraha and the Quit India movement and was imprisoned on three occasions. He was involved in the village reconstruction programmes at Rajkot in Gujarat and Komaravolu in Krishna district, Andhra Pradesh. He joined the Gandhi ashram established by Yerneni Subrahmanyam in Komaravolu. Commenting on Sreeramulu's dedication and fasting ability, Mahatma Gandhi once said, "If only I have eleven more followers like Sreeramulu I will win freedom from British rule in a year."

Between 1923 and 1944, he worked for the widespread adoption of charkha textile-spinning in Nellore district. He was known for taking food provided by all households, regardless of caste or creed. He undertook three fasts, during 1946–1948, in support of Dalit rights to enter holy places, such as the temples of Nellore. He fasted in support of Dalit entry rights to the Venu Gopala Swamy Temple in Moolapeta, Nellore, rights which were eventually secured. He again fasted to receive favourable orders, passed by the Madras government, to further uplift the Dalit community.

As a result, the government instructed District Collectors to attend to measures of Dalit upliftment for at least one day per week. During the last stages of his life, Sreeramulu stayed in Nellore and worked for Dalit upliftment, walking the city with slogan placards calling for Dalit upliftment, barefoot and with no umbrella against the sun. Some locals thought him insane, and he was chastised by the non Dalit castes and his own Komati community for his solidarity with the Dalit cause.

== Statehood for Andhra ==
In an effort to protect the interests of the Telugu people in Madras Presidency, and to preserve the culture of Andhra people, he attempted to force the government to listen to public demands for the separation of the Andhra region from the Madras Presidency, based on linguistic lines and with Madras as its capital. He went on a lengthy fast, stopping when Prime Minister Jawaharlal Nehru promised to support creation of Andhra State. Despite this concession, little progress was made on the issue, largely due to the Telugu people's insistence on retention of Madras as their future capital. The JVP (Jawahar, Vallabhbhai, Pattabhi) committee, headed by Jawaharlal Nehru, Vallabhbhai Patel and Pattabhi Sitaramayya, would not accept that proposal.

With the Andhra State still not granted, Sreeramulu resumed his hunger strike, at the Madras house of Maharshi Bulusu Sambamurti on 19 October 1952, despite the entreaties of supporters who stated that retention of Madras was a futile cause. Despite the Andhra Congress committee's disavowal of the fast, this action captured the public attention.

Despite strikes and demonstrations by the Andhra people, the government made no clear statement regarding the formation of the new state, and Sreeramulu died during the night of 16 December 1952. Only one person before him in modern Indian history, Jatindra Nath Das, actually fasted to death; all the others either gave up or were arrested and force fed or hospitalised.

In his death procession, people shouted slogans praising his sacrifice, with thousands more joining as the procession reached Mount Road, Madras. The procession broke into a riot and accompanying destruction of public property. As the news spread, disorder broke out in Vizianagaram, Visakhapatnam, Vijayawada, Bhimavaram, Tadepalligudem, Rajahmundry, Eluru, Guntur, Tenali, Ongole, Kanigiri and Nellore. Police fatally shot seven people in Anakapalle and Vijayawada. The popular agitation continued for three to four days disrupting normal life in Madras and Andhra regions. On 19 December 1952, Prime Minister Nehru announced that a separate Andhra state would be formed.

=== Aftermath ===
On 1 October 1953, the Telugu speaking Andhra State was established with its capital in Kurnool. Later, Andhra state merged with the Telugu-speaking districts of Hyderabad State, called Telangana to form Andhra Pradesh. Hyderabad became the capital city which was formed on 1 November 1956.

== Legacy ==
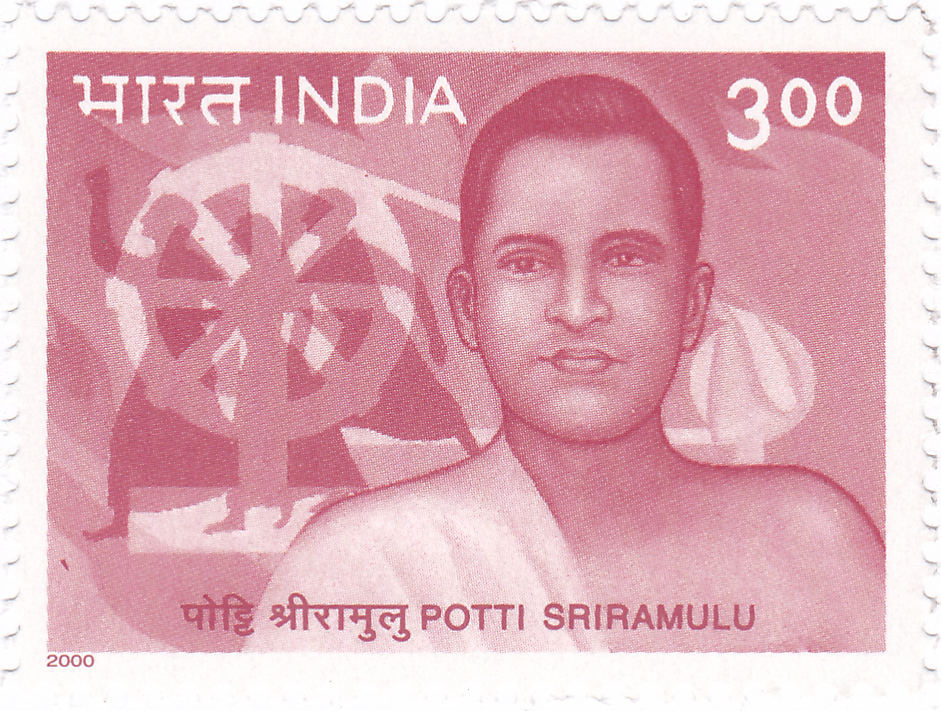
Sreeramulu on a 2000 stamp of India

The house where Potti Sreeramulu died is 126 Royapettah High Road, Mylapore, Chennai; it has been preserved as a monument of importance by the state government of Andhra State.
