= Andhra State =

Former state of India (1953–56) in Andhra Pradesh

Coordinates: 15.8°N 78.0°E

Andhra State Āndhra Rāṣṭramu
- Former State 1953–1956
- Location of Andhra State; Āndhra Rāṣṭramu in India
- Country: India
- Region: South India
- Previously was: Part of Madras State
- Formation: 1 October 1953
- Dissolution: 1 November 1956 (by States Reorganisation Act, 1956)
- Capital and largest city: Kurnool

Government
  - Type: Federated state
  - Governor
  - 1953–1956: Chandulal Madhavlal Trivedi (First and Last)
  - Chief Minister
  - 1953–1954: Tanguturi Prakasam (First)
  - 1955–1956: Bezawada Gopala Reddy (Last)
- Time zone: UTC+05:30 (IST)
Preceded by	Succeeded by
Madras State	Andhra Pradesh (1956–2014)

Andhra State (IAST: Āndhra Rāṣṭramu; [ˈɑːndʰrʌ raːʂʈɾamu]), created in 1953, was the official name of the State of Andhra Pradesh until 1956. The state was formed from Telugu-speaking districts of the erstwhile Madras State, which form two distinct cultural regions – Rayalaseema and Coastal Andhra.

Under the provisions of the States Reorganisation Act, 1956, the Telugu-speaking territories of Hyderabad State were merged with Andhra State, and its name was changed to 'Andhra Pradesh'.

These newly added territories would later form the state of Telangana in 2014.

== Creation of Andhra State ==
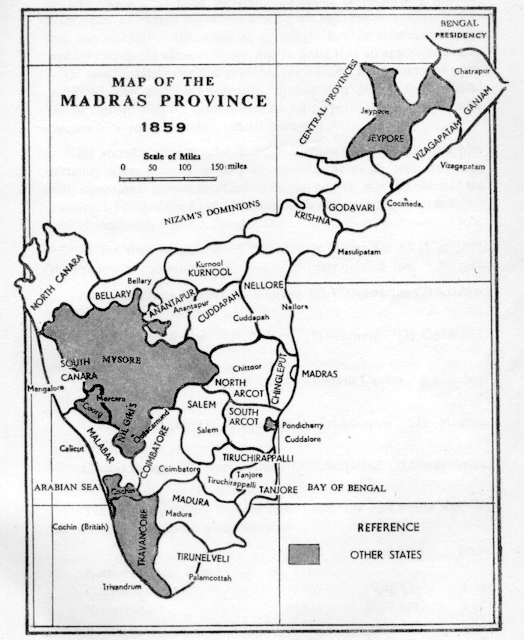
Madras Province

Andhra State from 1953 to 1956 (Marked in Blue)

In an effort to protect the interests of the Telugu people of Madras State, Potti Sreeramulu attempted to force the Madras State government to listen to public demands for the separation of Telugu-speaking districts (Rayalaseema and Coastal Andhra) from Madras State to form Andhra State. He went on a lengthy fast and only stopped when Prime Minister Jawaharlal Nehru made a promise to form Andhra State. Later, after witnessing no real progress towards the creation of Andhra State, he started fasting again in Maharshi Bulusu Sambamurti's house in Madras, on 19 October 1952. This caught people's attention despite the disapproval of the fast by the Andhra INC. The government did not make a clear statement about the formation of a new state, despite several strikes and demonstrations by Telugu people. At midnight of 15 December (i.e., early 16 December 1952), Sreeramulu died while fasting. The house has been preserved as a monument by the state government.

During Sreeramulu's death procession, people shouted slogans praising his sacrifice. Later, they went into a frenzy and began to destroy public property. The news spread quickly and created an uproar among the people in far off places like Chirala, Srikakulam, Visakhapatnam, Vijayawada, Rajahmundry, Eluru, Bhimavaram, Ballary, Guntur, Tenali, Ongole and Nellore. Seven people were killed in clashes with police in Anakapalle and Vijayawada. The popular agitation continued for three to four days disrupting normal life in the Madras and Andhra regions. On 19 December 1952, the Prime Minister of the country Jawaharlal Nehru made an announcement about the formation of a separate state for the Telugu-speaking people of Madras State. The central government appointed K. N. Wanchoo, Chief Justice of the Rajasthan High Court, to look into issues related to formation of Andhra State. Parliament passed the Andhra State Act in September 1953.

On 1 October 1953, 11 districts in the Telugu-speaking portion of Madras State became the new Andhra State with Kurnool as the capital. Tanguturi Prakasam Pantulu (also known as Andhra Kesari – "The Lion of Andhra") became the first Chief Minister of the new state.

This marked the first time a state was formed in independent India for linguistic reason (Odisha was formed before independence for Odia speakers). Formation of this first "linguistic state" paved the way to creation of more and provided an opportunity for these states to develop independently, linguistically and economically, each of them having a state to support.

== Government and administration ==
=== Governors ===
Governors of Andhra State, Andhra State consisted of Coastal Andhra and Rayalaseema regions. This state was carved out of Madras State in 1953.

Name	Portrait	From	To	Term length
Chandulal Madhavlal Trivedi		1 October 1953	31 October 1956	3 years, 30 days

=== Chief ministers ===
On 1 October 1953, 11 districts in the Telugu-speaking portion of Madras State became the new Andhra State with Kurnool as the capital.

Portrait	Chief Minister (Lifespan) Constituency	Term of the office			Election (Assembly)	Party	Government	Appointed by (Governor)
Portrait	Chief Minister (Lifespan) Constituency	Term start	Term end	Duration	Election (Assembly)	Party	Government	Appointed by (Governor)
	Tanguturi Prakasam (1872–1957) –	1 October 1953	15 November 1954	1 year, 45 days	1952 (1st)	Indian National Congress	Prakasam	Chandulal Madhavlal Trivedi
President's rule imposed during the period (15 November 1954 – 28 March 1955) (Note: President's rule may be imposed when the "government in a state is not able to function as per the Constitution", which often happens because no party or coalition has a majority in the assembly. When the President's rule is in force in a state, its council of ministers stands dissolved. The office of chief minister thus lies vacant, and the administration is taken over by the governor, who functions on behalf of the central government. At times, the legislative assembly also stands dissolved.)
	Bezawada Gopala Reddy (1907–1997); MLA for Atmakur	28 March 1955	31 October 1956	1 year, 217 days	1955 (2nd)	Indian National Congress	Gopala	Chandulal Madhavlal Trivedi

== Deputy Chief ministers ==
Andhra State consisted of North Andhra, Coastal Andhra and Rayalaseema regions. This state was carved out of Madras State in 1953. Neelam Sanjeeva Reddy served as deputy CM under Prakasam and Bezawada Gopala Reddy. Later, the Andhra state was merged with Telangana province of Hyderabad to form Andhra Pradesh in November 1956.

Portrait	Name	Constituency	Term of office			Assembly (election)	Party
Portrait	Name	Constituency	From	To	Days in office	Assembly (election)	Party
	Neelam Sanjiva Reddy	–	1 October 1953	15 November 1954	1 year, 45 days	1st (1952 election)	Indian National Congress
	Vacant	N/A	15 November 1954	28 March 1955	133 days		N/A
	Neelam Sanjiva Reddy	Kalahasti	30 March 1955	31 October 1956	1 year, 215 days	(1955 election)	Indian National Congress

=== Leaders of the Opposition ===
Name (Constituency)	Portrait	Term		Party	Assembly (Election)
Puchalapalli Sundarayya (Gannavaram)		1955	1956	Communist Party of India	First Assembly (1955 election)

=== First Women MLA ===
Name (Constituency)	Portrait	Term		Party	Assembly (Election)
Tamma Kotamma Reddy (Prathipadu)		1952	1955	Indian National Congress	First Assembly (1952 election)

== List of districts ==
Districts of Andhra State
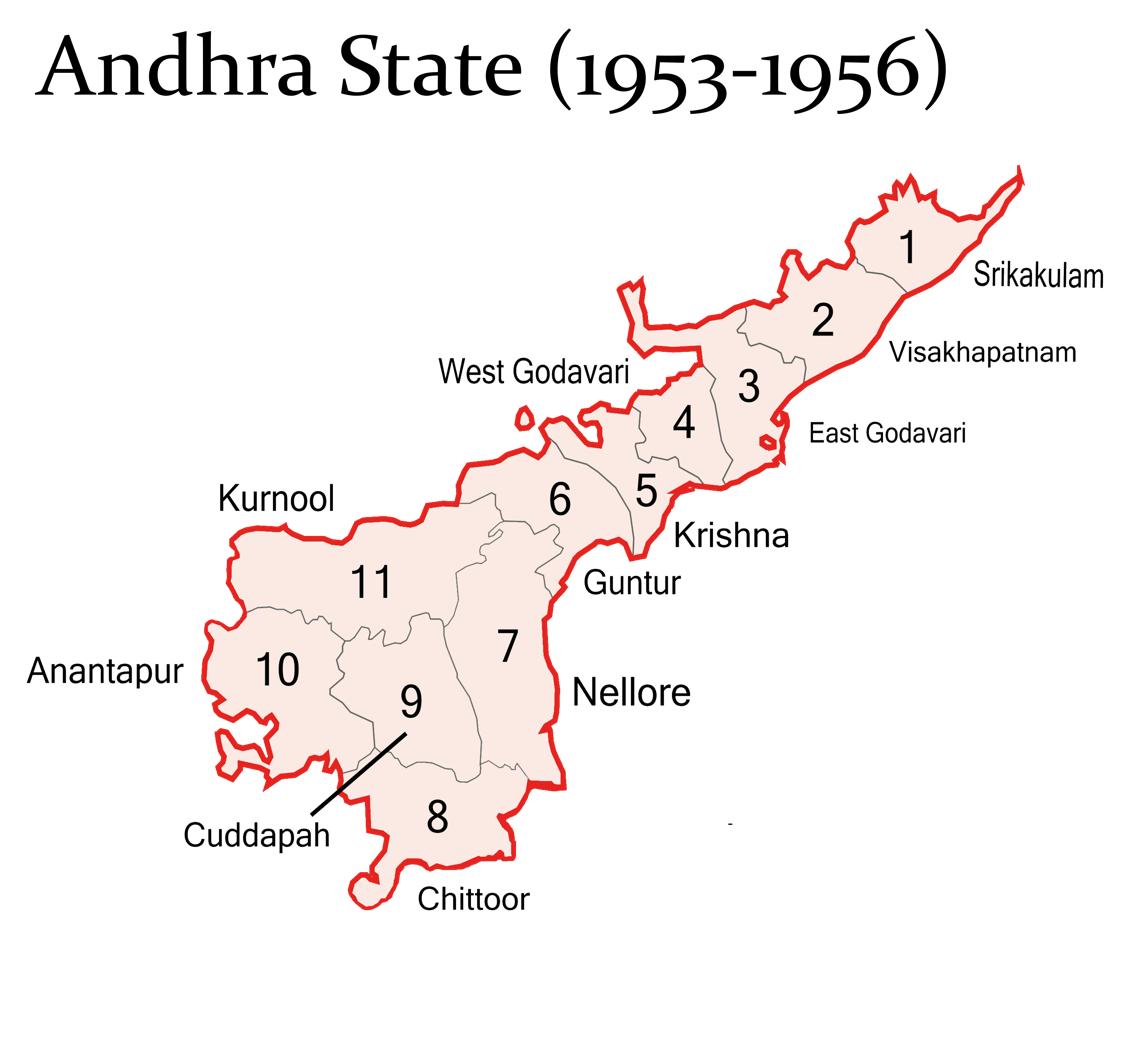
- Andhra State Political Map
- Category: Districts
- Location: Andhra State
- Number: 2 divisions; 11 districts
- Government: Government of Andhra State

During the time of the formation of Andhra State, it had only eleven districts.

on map	Official name	Division
1	Srikakulam	Coastal Andhra
2	Visakhapatnam	Coastal Andhra
3	East Godavari (Note: Bhadrachalam and Nuguru Venkatapuram taluks of East Godavari (part of coastal Andhra Pradesh), which are on the other side of the Godavari River, were merged into Khammam district on grounds of geographical contiguity and administrative viability. Earlier, Aswaraopeta was also part of West Godavari District and was added to Khammam district in 1959)	Coastal Andhra
4	West Godavari	Coastal Andhra
5	Krishna (Note: Munagala taluk was added to Nalgonda district from Krishna district in 1959)	Coastal Andhra
6	Guntur	Coastal Andhra
7	Nellore	Coastal Andhra
8	Chittoor	Rayalaseema
9	Kadapa	Rayalaseema
10	Anantapuram	Rayalaseema
11	Kurnool	Rayalaseema

== Vishalandhra Movement ==
The Visalandhra, Vishalandhra or Vishala Andhra was a movement in post-independence India for a united state for all Telugu speakers, a Greater Andhra. The movement succeeded and a separate state of Andhra Pradesh was formed by merging Telugu-speaking areas of Hyderabad State (Telangana) with Andhra State on 1 November 1956 as part of the States Reorganisation Act. (Andhra State had been previously carved out of Madras State on 1 October 1953.) However, on 2 June 2014, Telangana State was separated back out of Andhra Pradesh and the Vishalandhra experiment came to an end. The residual Andhra Pradesh now has approximately the same borders.

== Formation of United Andhra Pradesh ==
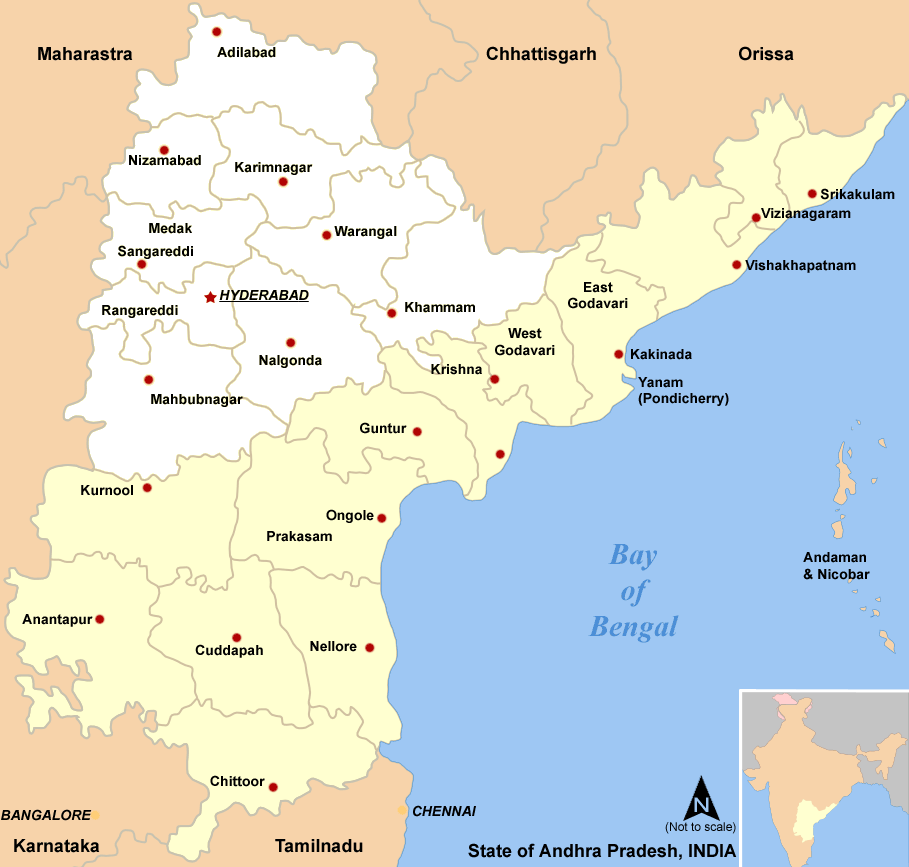
Andhra State (yellow), which merged with Telangana (white) to form the State of Andhra Pradesh in 1956

On 1 November 1956 Andhra State and the Telangana region of Hyderabad State were merged to form the united Telugu-speaking State of Andhra Pradesh. Non-Telugu-speaking parts of Hyderabad State were merged with Bombay State and Karnataka.

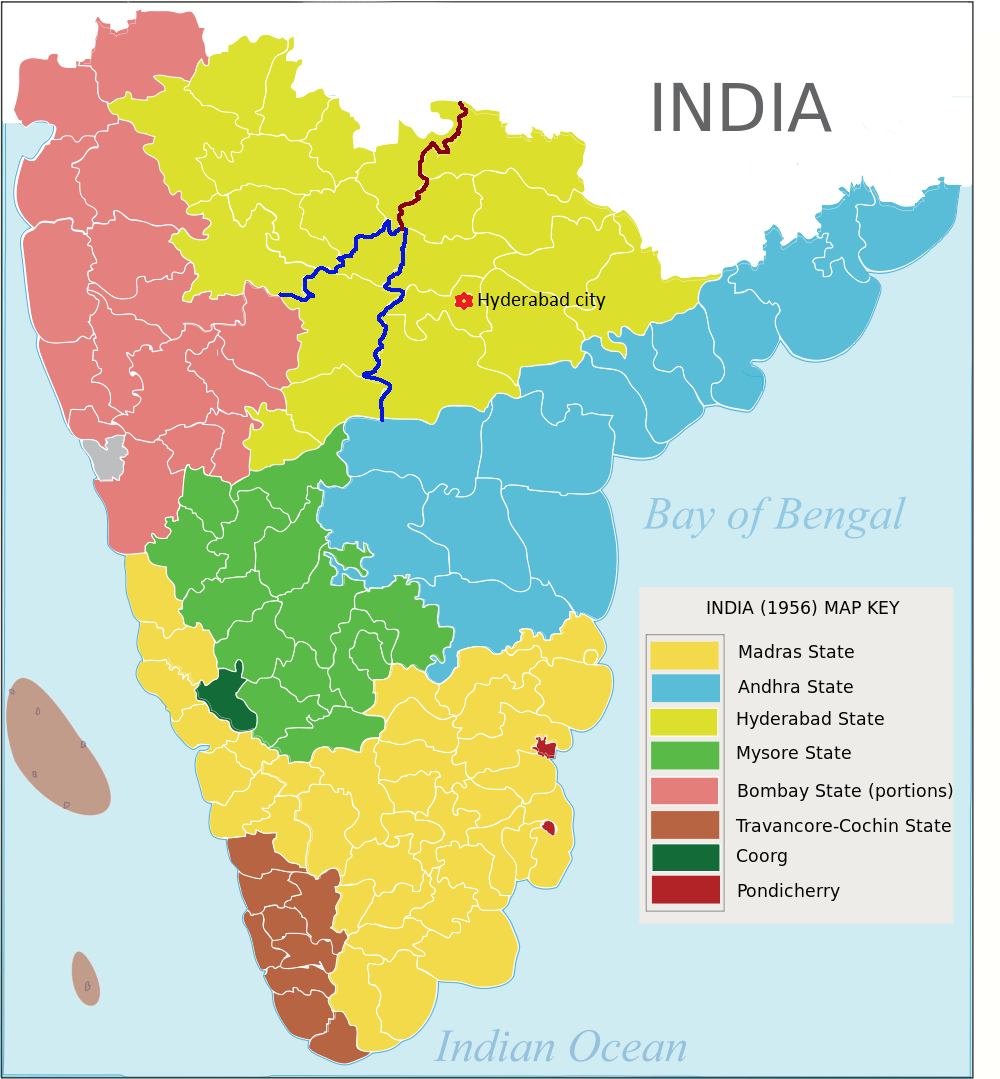
Hyderabad State in 1956 (in yellowish green). After a reorganization in 1956, regions of the state west of the red and blue lines merged with Bombay and Mysore States, respectively, and the rest of the state (Telangana) was merged with Andhra State to form Andhra Pradesh State.

=== SRC (Fazal Ali Commission) ===
Paragraph 382 of the SRC report dated 30 September 1955 said, "opinion in Andhra is overwhelmingly in favour of the larger unit, public opinion in Telangana has still to crystallize itself. Important leaders of public opinion in Andhra themselves seem to appreciate that the unification of Telangana with Andhra, though desirable, should be based on a voluntary and willing association of the people and that it is primarily for the people of Telangana to make a decision about their future".

While the Fazal Ali commission emphasizes the necessity and benefits Visalandhra, the report suggests that the process of merging may only be done after 5 years. In Paragraph 386, it states, "...for the present the Telangana area is to constitute into a separate State, which may be known as Hyderabad State with provision for its unification with Andhra after the general elections likely to be held in or about 1961 if by a two-thirds majority the legislature of the residency Hyderabad State expresses itself in favor of such unification".

Paragraph 387 goes on to say that the advantage of this arrangement will be that while the objective of the unification of the Andhras will neither be blurred nor impeded during a period of five or six years, the two governments may have stabilized their administrative machinery and, if possible, also reviewed their land revenue systems, etc., the object in view being the attainment of uniformity. The intervening period may incidentally provide an opportunity for allaying apprehensions and achieving the consensus of opinion necessary for a real union between the two states.

From the content of Paragraph 387, the commission's main objective was to attain uniformity by achieving adequate administrative machinery and proper land review systems in the recently formed Andhra State and the new State of Hyderabad being formed and this duration could also be incidentally utilized for gaining consensus opinion for the merger of the two states. In line with SRC opinion, the elected leaders of both states decided for an immediate merger by achieving consensus by two-thirds majority strength in both assemblies of these states.

The Hyderabad chief minister, in his letter to the INC president, said Communist parties supported the merger for their political calculations. The Hyderabad PCC chief said the overwhelming majority of INC party members opposed the merger, that Communists were elected in special circumstances in 1951, that Visalandhra was not a political issue in 1951, and that the Assembly does not reflect the people's view on the issue. He also said 80% of INC delegates who were elected in 1955 opposed the merger. The government had to provide additional security for Communist leaders who supported the Visalandhra.

In the Hyderabad Assembly, on 3 December 1955, 147 of 174 MLAs expressed their view. 103 (including Marathi and Kannada MLAs) supported the merger, 16 were neutral, and 29 opposed it. Among Telangana MLAs, 59 supported the merger and 25 opposed it. Out of 94 Telangana MLAs in the assembly, 36 were Communists (PDF), 40 were INC, 11 were Socialist party (SP), and 9 were independents. Voting did not take place on the resolution because Telangana proponents insisted on including the phrase "As per the wishes of people" in the resolution.

To convince the leadership of Telangana to join the new state, an agreement was reached between the leaders of both sides. This came to be known as the Gentlemen's Agreement. The agreement allowed the formation of the State of Andhra Pradesh in 1956, against the SRC's recommendations of waiting until 1961 to get the approval of 2/3 of Telangana State assembly after the 2 cycles of elections in Telangana State.

== See also ==
- Madras Presidency
