= Political integration of India =

1947–1956 integration of Indian princely states

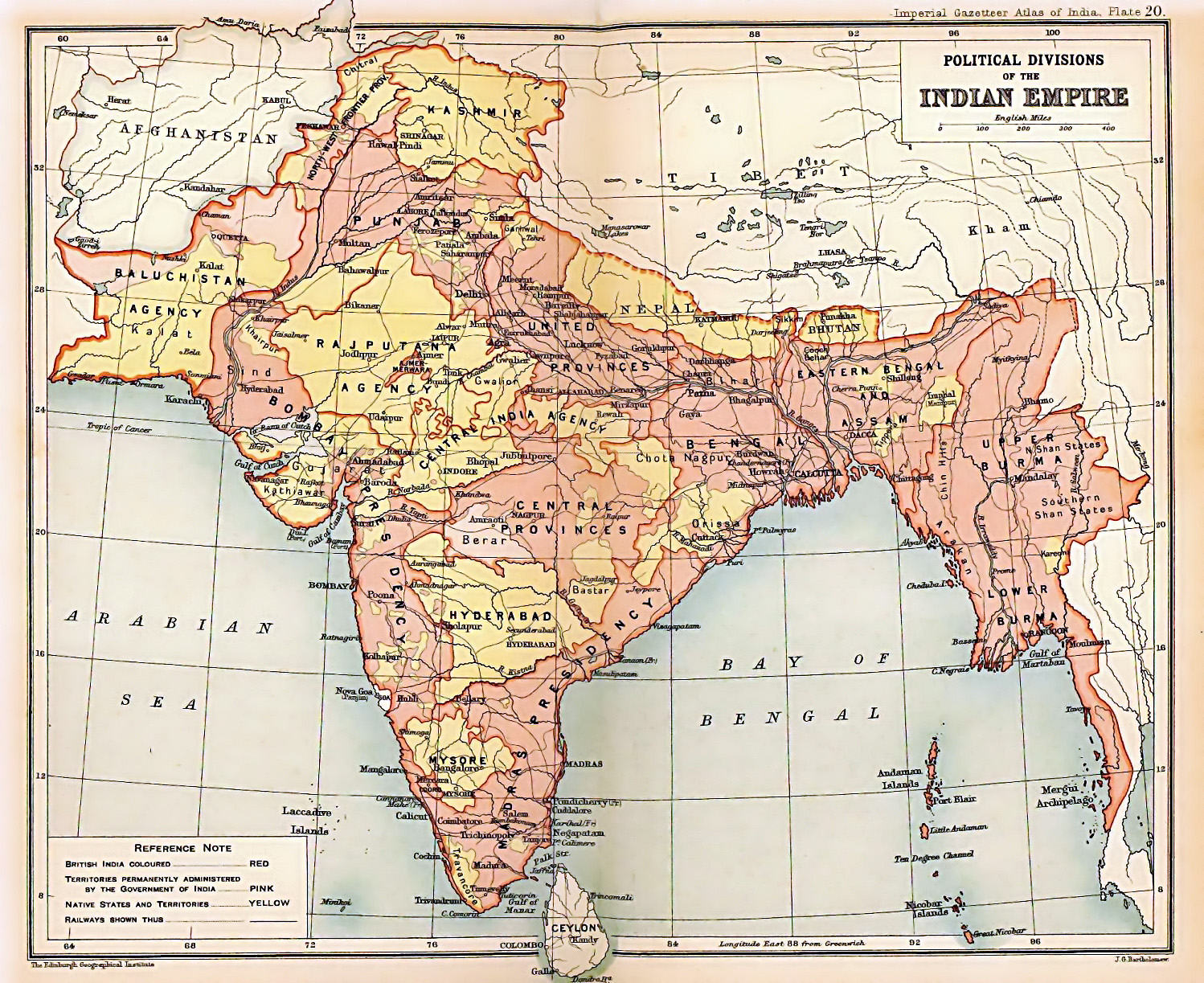
Political subdivisions of the Indian Empire in 1909 with British India (pink) and the princely states (yellow)

Before it gained independence in 1947, British Raj (also called the British Indian Empire) was divided into two sets of territories, one under direct British rule (British India), and the other consisting of princely states under the suzerainty of the British Crown, with control over their internal affairs remaining to varying degrees in the hands of their hereditary rulers. The latter included 562 princely states which had different types of revenue-sharing arrangements with the British, often depending on their size, population and local conditions. In addition, there were several colonial enclaves controlled by France and Portugal. After independence, the political integration of these territories into an Indian Union was a declared objective of the Indian National Congress, and the Government of India pursued this over the next decade.

In 1920, Congress (party) under the leadership of Mahatma Gandhi declared swaraj (self-rule) for Indians as its goal and asked the princes of India to establish responsible government. Jawaharlal Nehru played a major role in pushing Congress to confront the princely states and declared in 1929 that "only people who have the right to determine the future of the States must be the people of these States". In 1937, the Congress won in most parts of British India (not including the princely states) in the provincial elections, and started to intervene in the affairs of the states. In the same year, Gandhi played a major role in proposing a federation involving a union between British India and the princely states, with an Indian central government. In 1946, Jawaharlal Nehru observed that no princely state could prevail militarily against the army of independent India. In January 1947, Nehru said that independent India would not accept the divine right of kings. In May 1947, he declared that any princely state which refused to join the Constituent Assembly would be treated as an enemy state. Vallabhbhai Patel, Louis Mountbatten and V. P. Menon were more conciliatory towards the princes, and as the men charged with integrating the states, were successful in the task. Having secured their accession, they then proceeded, in a step-by-step process, to secure and extend the union government's authority over these states and transform their administrations until, by 1956, there was little difference between the territories that had been part of British India and those that had been princely states. Simultaneously, the Government of India, through a combination of military and diplomatic means, acquired de facto and de jure control over the remaining colonial enclaves, which too were integrated into India.

== Princely states in India ==
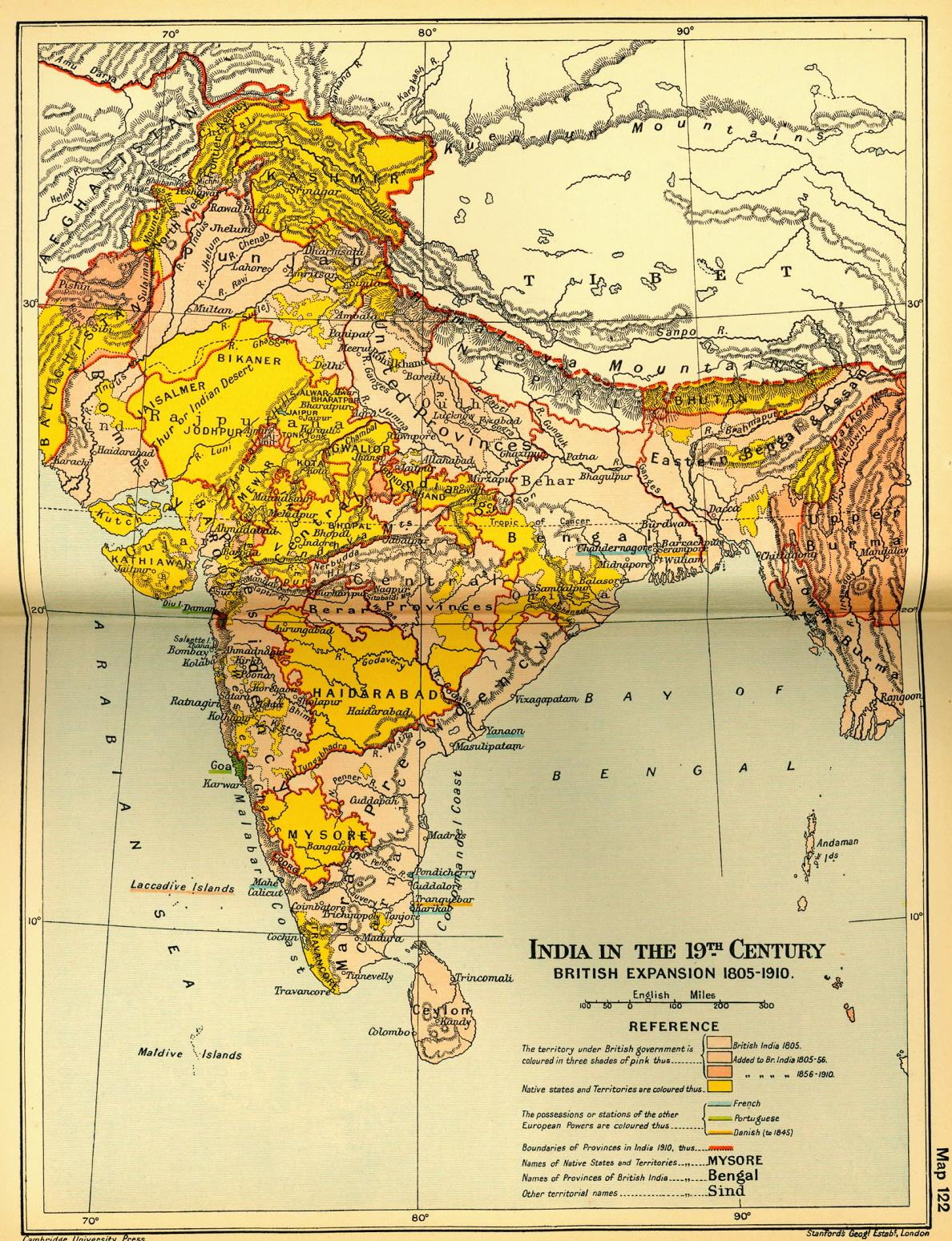
British expansion in 19th century India

The early history of British expansion in India was characterised by the co-existence of two approaches towards the existing princely states. The first was a policy of annexation, where the British sought to forcibly absorb the Indian princely states into the provinces which constituted their Empire in India. The second was a policy of indirect rule, where the British assumed paramountcy over princely states, but conceded to them sovereignty and varying degrees of internal self-government. During the early part of the 19th century, the policy of the British tended towards annexation, but the Indian Rebellion of 1857 forced a change in this approach, by demonstrating both the difficulty of absorbing and subduing annexed states, and the usefulness of princely states as a source of support. In 1858, the policy of annexation was formally renounced, and British relations with the remaining princely states thereafter were based on subsidiary alliances, whereby the British exercised paramountcy over all princely states, with the British crown as ultimate suzerain, but at the same time respected and protected them as allies, taking control of their external relations. The exact relations between the British and each princely state were regulated by individual treaties and varied widely, with some states having complete internal self-government, others being subject to significant control in their internal affairs, and some rulers being in effect little more than the owners of landed estates, with little autonomy.

During the 20th century, the British made several attempts to integrate the princely states more closely with British India, in 1921 creating the Chamber of Princes as a consultative and advisory body, and in 1936 transferring the responsibility for the supervision of smaller states from the provinces to the centre and creating direct relations between the Government of India and the larger princely states, superseding political agents. A more ambitious aim was a scheme of federation contained in the Government of India Act 1935, which envisaged the princely states and British India being united under a federal government. This scheme came close to success, but was abandoned in 1939 as a result of the outbreak of the Second World War. As a result, in the 1940s the relationship between the princely states and the crown remained regulated by the principle of paramountcy and by the various treaties between the British crown and the states.

Neither paramountcy nor the subsidiary alliances could continue after Indian independence. The British took the view that because they had been established directly between the British crown and the princely states, they could not be transferred to the newly independent dominions of India and Pakistan. At the same time, the alliances imposed obligations on Britain that it was not prepared to continue to carry out, such as the obligation to maintain troops in India for the defence of the princely states. The British government therefore decided that paramountcy, together with all treaties between them and the princely states, would come to an end upon the British departure from India.

== Reasons for integration ==
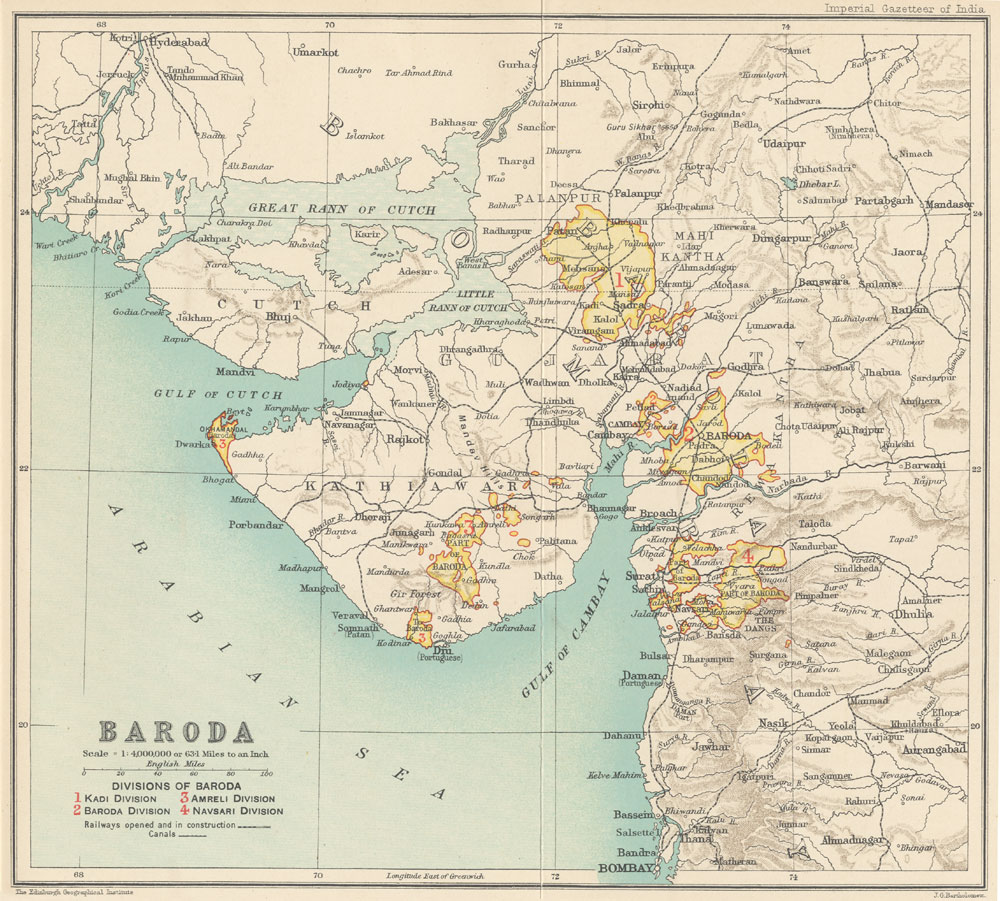
The Saurashtra and Kathiawar regions of Gujarat were home to over two hundred princely states, many with non-contiguous territories, as this map of Baroda shows.

The termination of paramountcy meant that all rights flowing from the states' relationship with the British crown would return to them, leaving them free to negotiate relationships with the new states of India and Pakistan "on a basis of complete freedom". Early British plans for the transfer of power, such as the offer produced by the Cripps Mission, recognised the possibility that some princely states might choose to stand out of independent India. This was unacceptable to the Indian National Congress, which regarded the independence of princely states as a denial of the course of Indian history, and consequently regarded this scheme as a "Balkanisation" of India. The Congress had traditionally been less active in the princely states because of their limited resources which restricted their ability to organise there and their focus on the goal of independence from the British, and because Congress leaders, in particular Mahatma Gandhi, were sympathetic to the more progressive princes as examples of the capacity of Indians to rule themselves.

In 1920, Congress under the leadership of Mahatma Gandhi declared that attainment of swaraj for Indians was its goal. It asked "all the sovereign princes of India to establish full responsible government in their states". Gandhi assured the princes that Congress will not intervene in internal affairs of the princely states. Congress reiterated their demand at 1928 Calcutta Congress, "This Congress assures the people of the Indian States of its sympathy with and support in their legitimate and peaceful struggle for the attainment of full responsible government in the States."

Jawaharlal Nehru played a major role in pushing Congress to confront the princely states. In his presidential address at Lahore session in 1929, Nehru declared: "The Indian states cannot live apart from the rest of the (sic) India". Nehru added he is "no believer in kings or princes" and that "the only people who have the right to determine the future of the States must be the people of these States. This Congress which claims self-determination cannot deny it to the people of the states."

After the Congress's electoral victory in 1937 elections, protests, sometimes violent, and satyagrahas against the princely states were organised and were supported by the Congress's ministries. Gandhi fasted in Rajkot State to demand "full responsible government" and added that "the people" were "the real rulers of Rajkot under the paramountcy of the Congress". Gandhi termed this protest as struggle against "the disciplined hordes of the British empire". Gandhi proclaimed that the Congress had now every right to intervene in "the states which are the vassals of the British". In 1937, Gandhi played a major role in formation of federation involving a union between British India and the princely states with an Indian central government. As a result of the federation scheme contained in the Government of India Act 1935 and the rise of socialist Congress leaders, the Congress began to actively engage with popular political and labour activity in the princely states.

In 1939, Nehru challenged the existence of the princely states and added that "the states in modern India are anachronistic and do not deserve to exist." By 1939, the Congress's formal stance was that the states must enter independent India, on the same terms and with the same autonomy as the provinces of British India, and with their people granted responsible government. As a result, it attempted to insist on the incorporation of the princely states into India in its negotiations with the British, but the British took the view that this was not in their power to grant. In July 1946, Nehru pointedly observed that no princely state could prevail militarily against the army of independent India.

A few British leaders, particularly Lord Mountbatten, the last British viceroy of India, were also uncomfortable with breaking links between independent India and the princely states. The development of trade, commerce and communications during the 19th and 20th centuries had bound the princely states to the British India through a complex network of interests. Agreements relating to railways, customs, irrigation, use of ports, and other similar agreements would get terminated, posing a serious threat to the economic life of the subcontinent. Mountbatten was also persuaded by the argument of Indian officials such as V. P. Menon that the integration of the princely states into independent India would, to some extent, assuage the wounds of partition. The result was that Mountbatten personally favoured and worked towards the accession of princely states to India following the transfer of power, as proposed by the Congress.

Hindu Mahasabha took funding from the princely states and supported them to remain independent even after the independence of India. V. D. Savarkar particularly hailed the Hindu dominated states as the 'bedrock of Hindu power' and defended their despotic powers, referring to them as the 'citadels of organised Hindu power'. He particularly hailed the princely states such as Mysore State, Travancore, Oudh and Baroda State as 'progressive Hindu states'.

== Accepting integration ==
The era of the princely states effectively ended with Indian independence in 1947; by 1950, almost all of the principalities had acceded to either India or Pakistan.

=== The princes' position ===
The rulers of the princely states were not uniformly enthusiastic about integrating their domains into independent India. The Jamkhandi State integrated first with Independent India. Some, such as the rulers of Bikaner and Jawhar, were motivated to join India out of ideological and patriotic considerations, but others insisted that they had the right to join either India or Pakistan, to remain independent, or form a union of their own. Bhopal, Travancore and Hyderabad announced that they did not intend to join either dominion. Hyderabad went as far as to appoint trade representatives in European countries and commencing negotiations with the Portuguese to lease or buy Goa to give it access to the sea, and Travancore pointed to the strategic importance to Western countries of its thorium reserves while asking for recognition. Some states proposed a subcontinent-wide confederation of princely states, as a third entity in addition to India and Pakistan. Bhopal attempted to build an alliance between the princely states and the Muslim League to counter the pressure being put on rulers by the Congress.

A number of factors contributed to the collapse of this initial resistance and to nearly all non-Muslim majority princely states agreeing to accede to India. An important factor was the lack of unity among the princes. The smaller states did not trust the larger states to protect their interests, and many Hindu rulers did not trust Muslim princes, in particular Hamidullah Khan, the Nawab of Bhopal and a leading proponent of independence, whom they viewed as an agent for Pakistan. Others, believing integration to be inevitable, sought to build bridges with the Congress, hoping thereby to gain a say in shaping the final settlement. The resultant inability to present a united front or agree on a common position significantly reduced their bargaining power in negotiations with the Congress. The decision by the Muslim League to stay out of the Constituent Assembly was also fatal to the princes' plan to build an alliance with it to counter the Congress, and attempts to boycott the Constituent Assembly altogether failed on 28 April 1947, when the states of Baroda, Bikaner, Cochin, Gwalior, Jaipur, Jodhpur, Patiala and Rewa took their seats in the Assembly.

Many princes were also pressured by popular sentiment favouring integration with India, which meant their plans for independence had little support from their subjects. The Maharaja of Travancore, for example, definitively abandoned his plans for independence after the attempted assassination of his dewan, Sir C. P. Ramaswami Iyer. In a few states, the chief ministers or dewans played a significant role in convincing the princes to accede to India. The key factors that led the states to accept integration into India were, however, the efforts of Lord Mountbatten, Sardar Vallabhbhai Patel and V. P. Menon. The latter two were respectively the political and administrative heads of the States Department, which was in charge of relations with the princely states.

=== Mountbatten's role ===
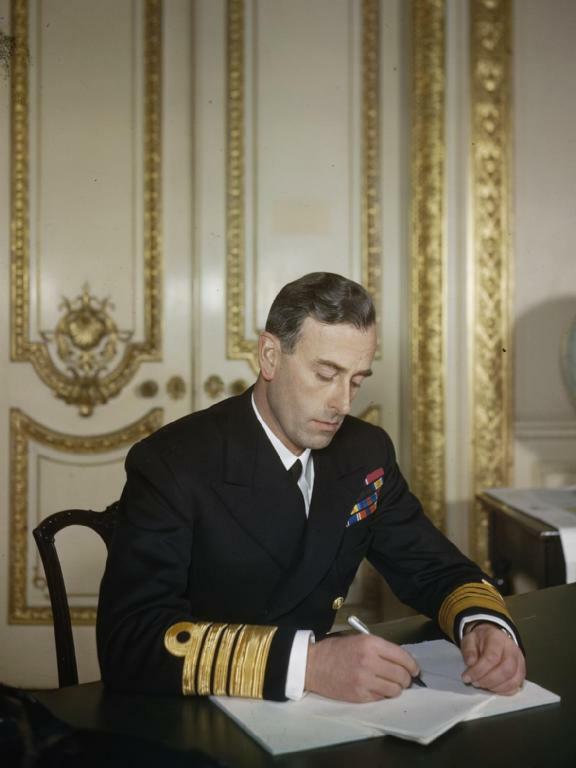
Lord Louis Mountbatten played an important role in convincing reluctant monarchs to accede to the Indian Union.

Mountbatten believed that securing the states' accession to India was crucial to reaching a negotiated settlement with the Congress for the transfer of power. As a relative of King George VI, he was trusted by most of the princes and was a personal friend of many, especially the Nawab of Bhopal, Hamidullah Khan. The princes also believed that he would be in a position to ensure that independent India adhered to any terms that might be agreed upon, because Prime Minister Jawaharlal Nehru and Patel had asked him to become the first Governor General of the Dominion of India.

Mountbatten used his influence with the princes to push them towards accession. He declared that the British Government would not grant dominion status to any of the princely states, nor would it accept them into the British Commonwealth, which meant that the British Crown would sever all connections with the states unless they joined either India or Pakistan. He pointed out that the Indian subcontinent was one economic entity, and that the states would suffer most if the link were broken. He also pointed to the difficulties that princes would face maintaining order in the face of threats such as the rise of communal violence and communist movements.

Mountbatten stressed that he would act as the trustee of the princes' commitment, as he would be serving as India's head of state well into 1948. He engaged in a personal dialogue with reluctant princes, such as the Nawab of Bhopal, who he asked through a confidential letter to sign the Instrument of Accession making Bhopal part of India, which Mountbatten would keep locked up in his safe. It would be handed to the States Department on 15 August only if the Nawab did not change his mind before then, which he was free to do. The Nawab agreed, and did not renege over the deal.

At the time, several princes complained that they were being betrayed by Britain, who they regarded as an ally, and Sir Conrad Corfield resigned his position as head of the Political Department in protest at Mountbatten's policies. Mountbatten's policies were also criticised by the opposition Conservative Party. Winston Churchill compared the language used by the Indian government with that used by Adolf Hitler before the invasion of Austria. Modern historians such as E. W. R. Lumby and R. J. Moore, however, take the view that Mountbatten played a crucial role in ensuring that the princely states agreed to accede to India.

=== Pressure and diplomacy ===
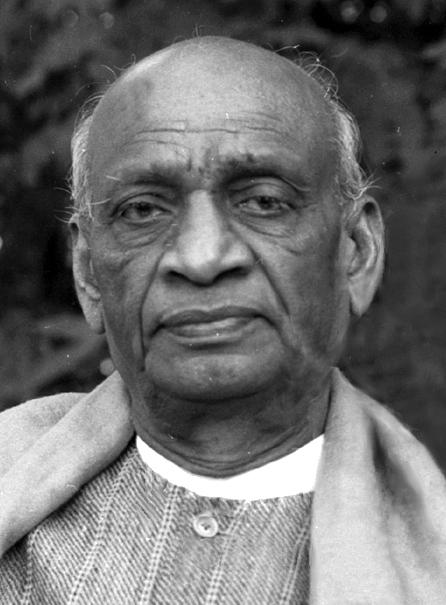
Vallabhbhai Patel as Minister for Home and States Affairs had the responsibility of welding the British Indian provinces and the princely states into a united India.

By far the most significant factor that led to the princes' decision to accede to India was the policy of the Congress and, in particular, of Patel and Menon. The Congress' stated position was that the princely states were not sovereign entities, and as such could not opt to be independent notwithstanding the end of paramountcy. The princely states must therefore accede to either India or Pakistan. In July 1946, Nehru pointedly observed that no princely state could prevail militarily against the army of independent India. In January 1947, he said that independent India would not accept the divine right of kings, and in May 1947, he declared that any princely state which refused to join the Constituent Assembly would be treated as an enemy state. Other Congress leaders, such as C. Rajagopalachari, argued that as paramountcy "came into being as a fact and not by agreement", it would necessarily pass to the government of independent India, as the successor of the British.

Patel and Menon, who were charged with the actual job of negotiating with the princes, took a more conciliatory approach than Nehru. The official policy statement of the Government of India made by Patel on 5 July 1947 made no threats. Instead, it emphasised the unity of India and the common interests of the princes and independent India, reassured them about the Congress' intentions, and invited them to join independent India "to make laws sitting together as friends than to make treaties as aliens". He reiterated that the States Department would not attempt to establish a relationship of domination over the princely states. Unlike the Political Department of the British Government, it would not be an instrument of paramountcy, but a medium whereby business could be conducted between the states and India as equals.

=== Instruments of accession ===
Patel and Menon backed up their diplomatic efforts by producing treaties that were designed to be attractive to rulers of princely states. Two key documents were produced. The first was the Standstill Agreement, which confirmed the continuance of the pre-existing agreements and administrative practices. The second was the Instrument of Accession, by which the ruler of the princely state in question agreed to the accession of his kingdom to independent India, granting the latter control over specified subject matters. The nature of the subject matters varied depending on the acceding state. The states which had internal autonomy under the British signed an Instrument of Accession which only ceded three subjects to the government of India—defence, external affairs, and communications, each defined in accordance with List 1 to Schedule VII of the Government of India Act 1935. Rulers of states which were in effect estates or talukas, where substantial administrative powers were exercised by the Crown, signed a different Instrument of Accession, which vested all residuary powers and jurisdiction in the Government of India. Rulers of states which had an intermediate status signed a third type of Instrument, which preserved the degree of power they had under the British.

The Instruments of Accession implemented a number of other safeguards. Clause 7 provided that the princes would not be bound to the Indian constitution as and when it was drafted. Clause 8 guaranteed their autonomy in all areas that were not ceded to the Government of India. This was supplemented by a number of promises. Rulers who agreed to accede would receive guarantees that their extra-territorial rights, such as immunity from prosecution in Indian courts and exemption from customs duty, would be protected, that they would be allowed to democratise slowly, that none of the eighteen major states would be forced to merge, and that they would remain eligible for British honours and decorations. In discussions, Lord Mountbatten reinforced the statements of Patel and Menon by emphasising that the documents gave the princes all the "practical independence" they needed. Mountbatten, Patel and Menon also sought to give princes the impression that if they did not accept the terms put to them then, they might subsequently need to accede on substantially less favourable terms. The Standstill Agreement was also used as a negotiating tool, as the States Department categorically ruled out signing a Standstill Agreement with princely states that did not sign an Instrument of Accession.

== Accession process ==
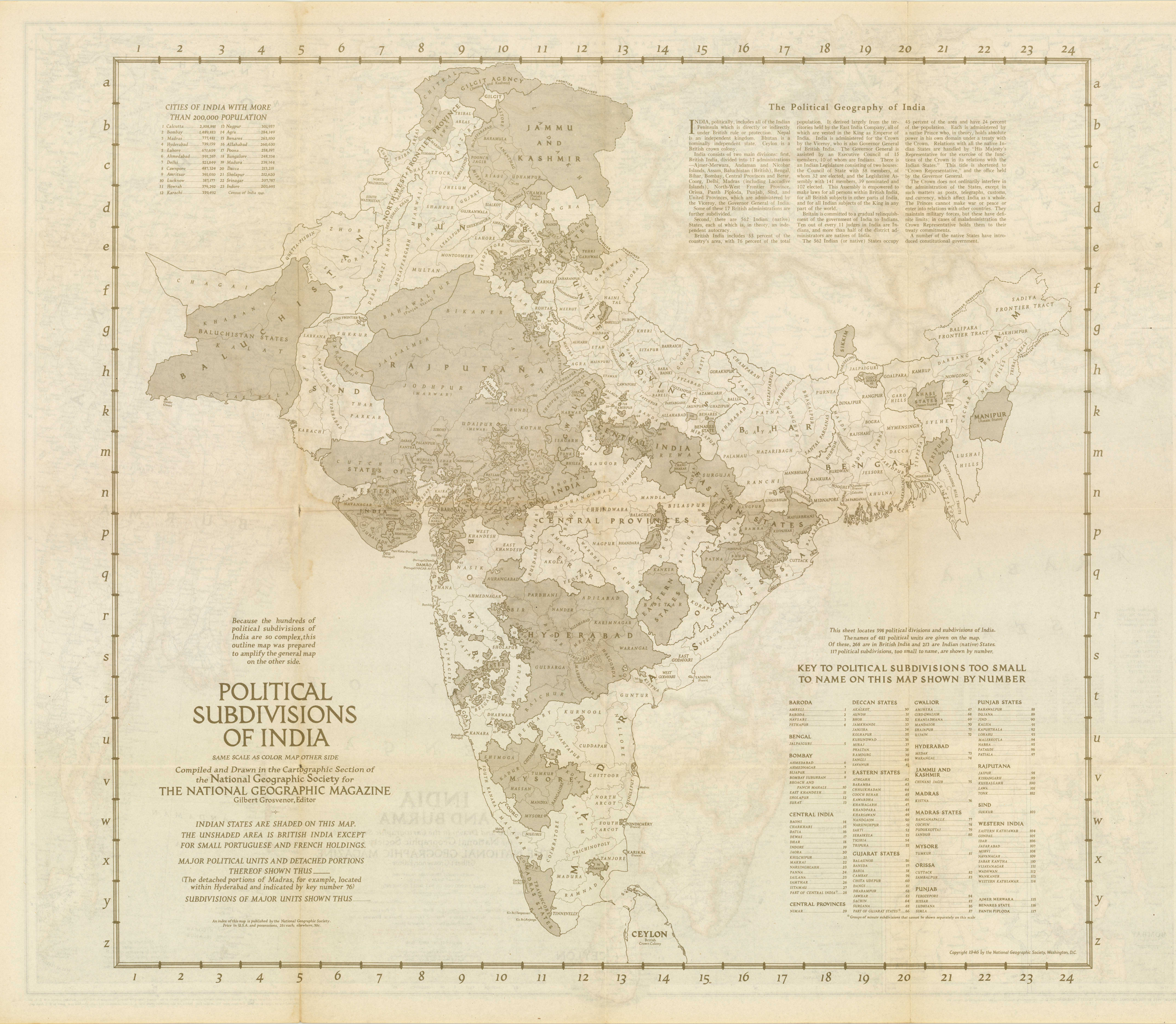
1946 political map of India, showing princely states (in gray) and British India

The limited scope of the Instruments of Accession and the promise of a wide-ranging autonomy and the other guarantees they offered, gave sufficient comfort to many rulers, who saw this as the best deal they could strike given the lack of support from the British, and popular internal pressures. Between May 1947 and the transfer of power on 15 August 1947, the vast majority of states signed Instruments of Accession. A few, however, held out. Some simply delayed signing the Instrument of Accession. Piploda, a small state in central India, did not accede until March 1948. The biggest problems, however, arose with a few border states, such as Jodhpur, which tried to negotiate better deals with Pakistan, with Junagadh, which actually did accede to Pakistan, and with Hyderabad and Kashmir, which decided to remain independent.

=== Border states ===
The ruler of Jodhpur, Hanwant Singh, was antipathetic to the Congress, and did not see much future in India for him or the lifestyle he wished to lead. Along with the ruler of Jaisalmer, he entered into negotiations with Muhammad Ali Jinnah, who was the designated head of state for Pakistan. Jinnah was keen to attract some of the larger border states, hoping thereby to attract other Rajput states to Pakistan and compensate for the loss of half of Bengal and Punjab. He offered to permit Jodhpur and Jaisalmer to accede to Pakistan on any terms they chose, giving their rulers blank sheets of paper and asking them to write down their terms, which he would sign. Jaisalmer refused, arguing that it would be difficult for him to side with Muslims against Hindus in the event of communal problems. Hanwant Singh came close to signing. However, the atmosphere in Jodhpur was in general hostile to accession to Pakistan. Mountbatten also pointed out that the accession of a predominantly Hindu state to Pakistan would violate the principle of the two-nation theory on which Pakistan was based, and was likely to cause communal violence in the State. Hanwant Singh was persuaded by these arguments, and somewhat reluctantly agreed to accede to India.

In the northeast India, the border states of Manipur and Tripura acceded to India on 11 August and 13 August respectively.

=== Junagadh ===
Although the states were in theory free to choose whether they wished to accede to India or Pakistan, Mountbatten had pointed out that "geographic compulsions" meant that most of them must choose India. In effect, he took the position that only the states that shared a border with Pakistan could choose to accede to it.

The Nawab of Junagadh, a princely state located on the south-western end of Gujarat and having no common border with Pakistan, chose to accede to Pakistan ignoring Mountbatten's views, arguing that it could be reached from Pakistan by sea. The rulers of two states that were subject to the suzerainty of Junagadh—Mangrol and Babariawad—reacted to this by declaring their independence from Junagadh and acceding to India. In response, the Nawab of Junagadh militarily occupied the states. The rulers of neighbouring states reacted angrily, sending their troops to the Junagadh frontier and appealed to the Government of India for assistance. A group of Junagadhi people, led by Samaldas Gandhi, formed a government-in-exile, the Aarzi Hukumat ("provisional government").

India believed that if Junagadh was permitted to go to Pakistan, the communal tension already simmering in Gujarat would worsen, and refused to accept the accession. The government pointed out that the state was 80% Hindu, and called for a referendum to decide the question of accession. Simultaneously, they cut off supplies of fuel and coal to Junagadh, severed air and postal links, sent troops to the frontier, and reoccupied the principalities of Mangrol and Babariawad that had acceded to India. Pakistan agreed to discuss a plebiscite, subject to the withdrawal of Indian troops, a condition India rejected. On 26 October, the Nawab and his family fled to Pakistan following clashes with Indian troops. On 7 November, Junagadh's court, facing collapse, invited the Government of India to take over the State's administration. The Government of India agreed. A plebiscite was conducted in February 1948, which went almost unanimously in favour of accession to India.

To this day, Pakistan claims sovereignty over Junagadh state.

=== Jammu and Kashmir ===
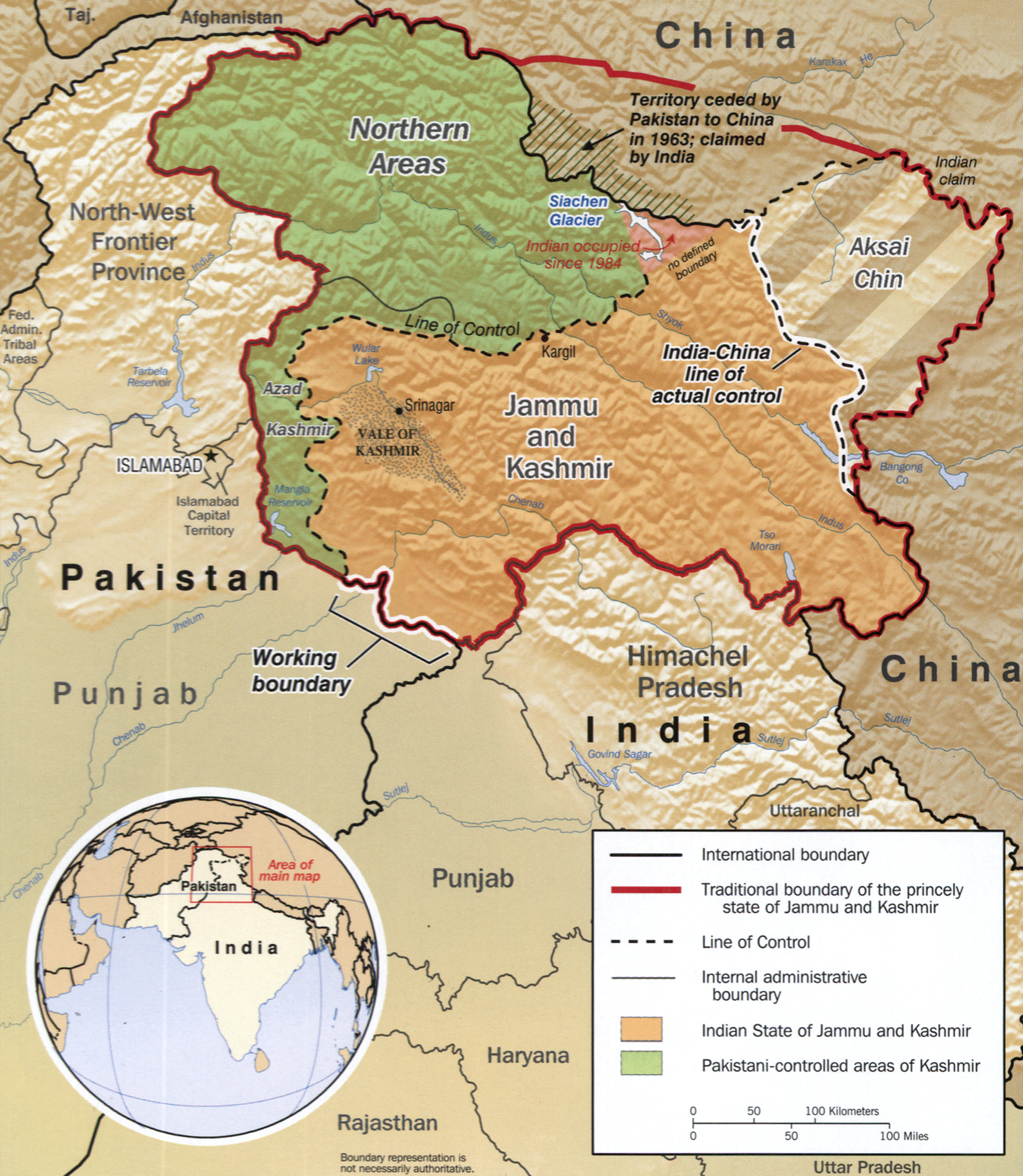
Shown in green is the Kashmiri region under Pakistani control. The dark-brown region represents Indian-administered Jammu and Kashmir while the Aksai Chin is under Chinese administration.

At the time of the transfer of power, the state of Jammu and Kashmir (widely called "Kashmir") was ruled by Maharaja Hari Singh, a Hindu, although the state itself had a Muslim majority. Hari Singh was equally hesitant about acceding to either India or Pakistan, as either would have provoked adverse reactions in parts of his kingdom. He signed a Standstill Agreement with Pakistan and proposed one with India as well, but announced that Kashmir intended to remain independent. However, his rule was opposed by Sheikh Abdullah, the popular leader of Kashmir's largest political party, the National Conference, who demanded his abdication.

Pakistan, attempting to force the issue of Kashmir's accession, cut off supplies and transport links. Its transport links with India were tenuous and flooded during the rainy season. Thus Kashmir's only links with the two dominions was by air. Rumours about atrocities against the Muslim population of Poonch by the Maharajah's forces circulated in Pakistan. Shortly thereafter, Pathan tribesmen from the North-West Frontier Province of Pakistan crossed the border and entered Kashmir. The invaders made rapid progress towards Srinagar. The Maharaja of Kashmir wrote to India, asking for military assistance. India required the signing of an Instrument of Accession and setting up an interim government headed by Sheikh Abdullah in return. The Maharaja complied, but Nehru declared that it would have to be confirmed by a plebiscite, although there was no legal requirement to seek such confirmation.

Indian troops secured Jammu, Srinagar and the valley itself during the First Kashmir War, but the intense fighting flagged with the onset of winter, which made much of the state impassable. Prime Minister Nehru, recognising the degree of international attention brought to bear on the dispute, sought UN arbitration, arguing that India would otherwise have to invade Pakistan itself, in view of its failure to stop the tribal incursions. On 13 August 1948, the UN adopted a three-part resolution and demanded ceasefire. On 1 January 1949, India agreed to a ceasefire. The plebiscite was never held, and on 26 January 1950, the Constitution of India came into force in Kashmir, but with special provisions made for the state. India did not, however, capture all of the Jammu and Kashmir. The northern and western portions of Kashmir came under Pakistan's control in 1947 during 1947 Poonch rebellion and 1947 Gilgit rebellion, and came to be called Pakistan-administered Kashmir.

=== Hyderabad ===
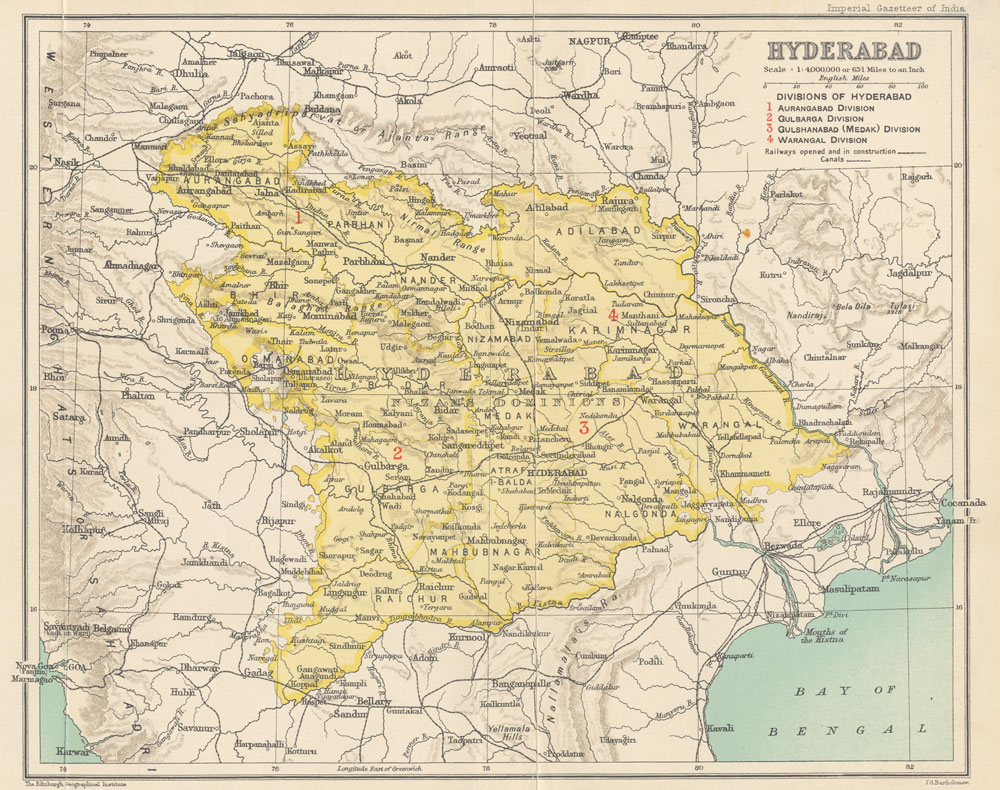
Hyderabad State in 1909. Its former territories are today incorporated in the Indian states of Telangana, Karnataka and Maharashtra.

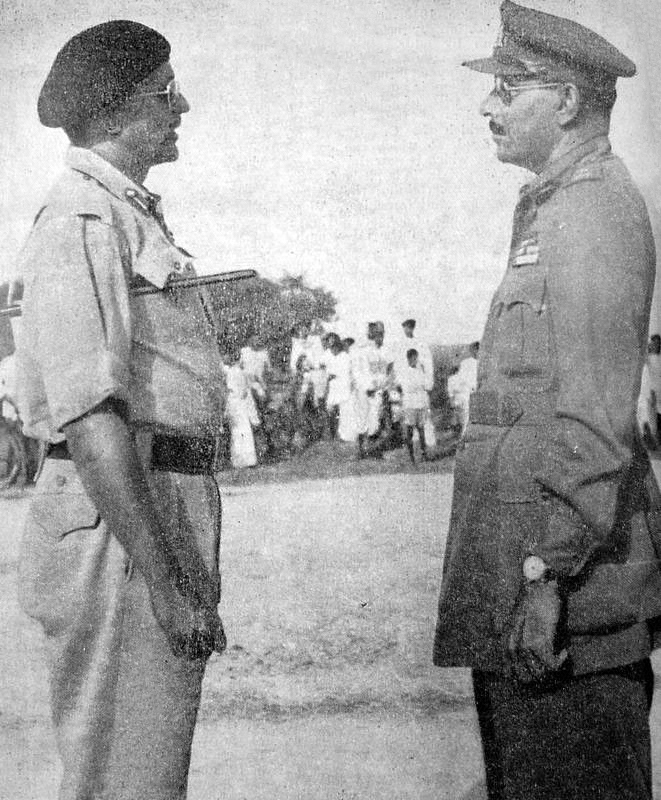
Major General Syed Ahmed El Edroos (at right) offers his surrender of the Hyderabad State Forces to Major General (later General and Army Chief) Joyanto Nath Chaudhuri at Secunderabad.

Hyderabad was a landlocked state that stretched over 82,000 square miles (over 212,000 square kilometres) in southeastern India. While 87% of its 17 million people were Hindu, its ruler Nizam Osman Ali Khan was a Muslim, and its politics were dominated by a Muslim elite. The Muslim nobility and the Ittehad-ul-Muslimeen, a powerful pro-Nizam Muslim party, insisted Hyderabad remain independent and stand on an equal footing to India and Pakistan. Accordingly, the Nizam in June 1947 issued a firman announcing that on the transfer of power, his state would be resuming independence. The Government of India rejected the firman, terming it a "legalistic claim of doubtful validity". It argued that the strategic location of Hyderabad, which lay astride the main lines of communication between northern and southern India, meant it could easily be used by "foreign interests" to threaten India, and that in consequence, the issue involved national-security concerns. It also pointed out that the state's people, history and location made it unquestionably Indian, and that its own "common interests" therefore mandated its integration into India.

The Nizam was prepared to enter into a limited treaty with India, which gave Hyderabad safeguards not provided for in the standard Instrument of Accession, such as a provision guaranteeing Hyderabad's neutrality in the event of a conflict between India and Pakistan. India rejected this proposal, arguing that other states would demand similar concessions. A temporary Standstill Agreement was signed as a stopgap measure, even though Hyderabad had not yet agreed to accede to India. By December 1947, however, India was accusing Hyderabad of repeatedly violating the Agreement, while the Nizam alleged that India was blockading his state, a charge India denied.

The Nizam was also beset by the Telangana Rebellion, led by communists, which started in 1946 as a peasant revolt against feudal elements; and one which the Nizam was not able to subjugate. The situation deteriorated further in 1948. The Razakars ("volunteers"), a militia affiliated to the Ittehad-ul-Muslimeen and set up under the influence of Muslim radical Qasim Razvi, assumed the role of supporting the Muslim ruling class against upsurges by the Hindu populace, and began intensifying its activities and was accused of attempting to intimidate villages. The Hyderabad State Congress Party, affiliated to the Indian National Congress, launched a political agitation. Matters were made worse by communist groups, which had originally supported the Congress but now switched sides and began attacking Congress groups. Attempts by Mountbatten to find a negotiated solution failed and, in August, the Nizam, claiming that he feared an imminent invasion, attempted to approach the UN Security Council and the International Court of Justice. Patel now insisted that if Hyderabad was allowed to continue its independence, the prestige of the Government would be tarnished and then neither Hindus nor Muslims would feel secure in its realm. On 7 September, Jawaharlal Nehru gave ultimatum to Nizam, demanding ban on the Razakars and return of Indian troops to Secunderabad.

On 13 September 1948, two days after the death of Jinnah, the Indian Army was sent into Hyderabad under Operation Polo on the grounds that the law and order situation there threatened the peace of South India. The troops met little resistance by the Razakars and between 13 and 18 September took complete control of the state. The operation led to massive communal violence with estimates of deaths ranging from the official one of 27,000–40,000 to scholarly ones of 200,000 or more. The Nizam was retained as the head of state in the same manner as the other princes who acceded to India. He thereupon disavowed the complaints that had been made to the UN and, despite vehement protests from Pakistan and strong criticism from other countries, the Security Council did not deal further with the question, and Hyderabad was absorbed into India.

== Completing integration ==
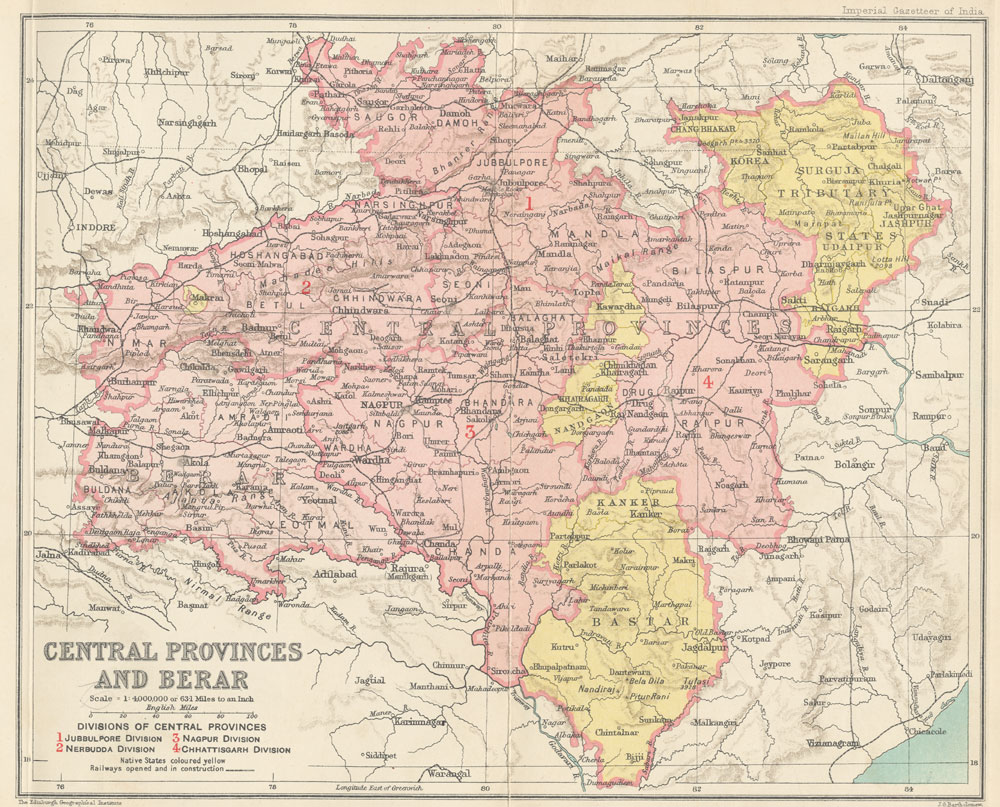
Central Provinces and Berar, which form part of modern Chhattisgarh, Madhya Pradesh and Maharashtra

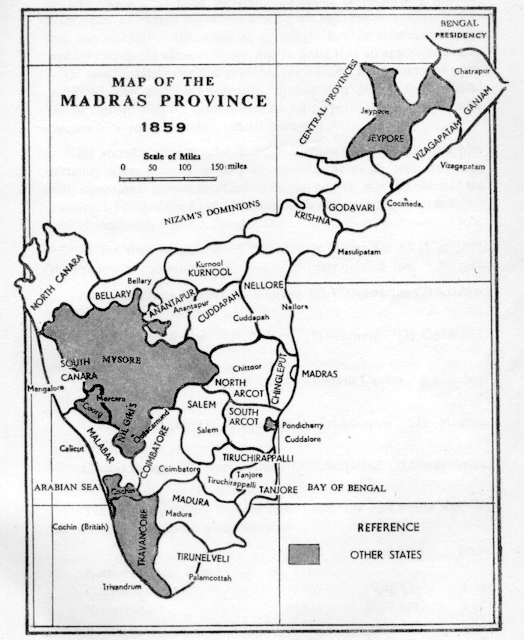
The British-ruled Madras Province and adjacent princely states

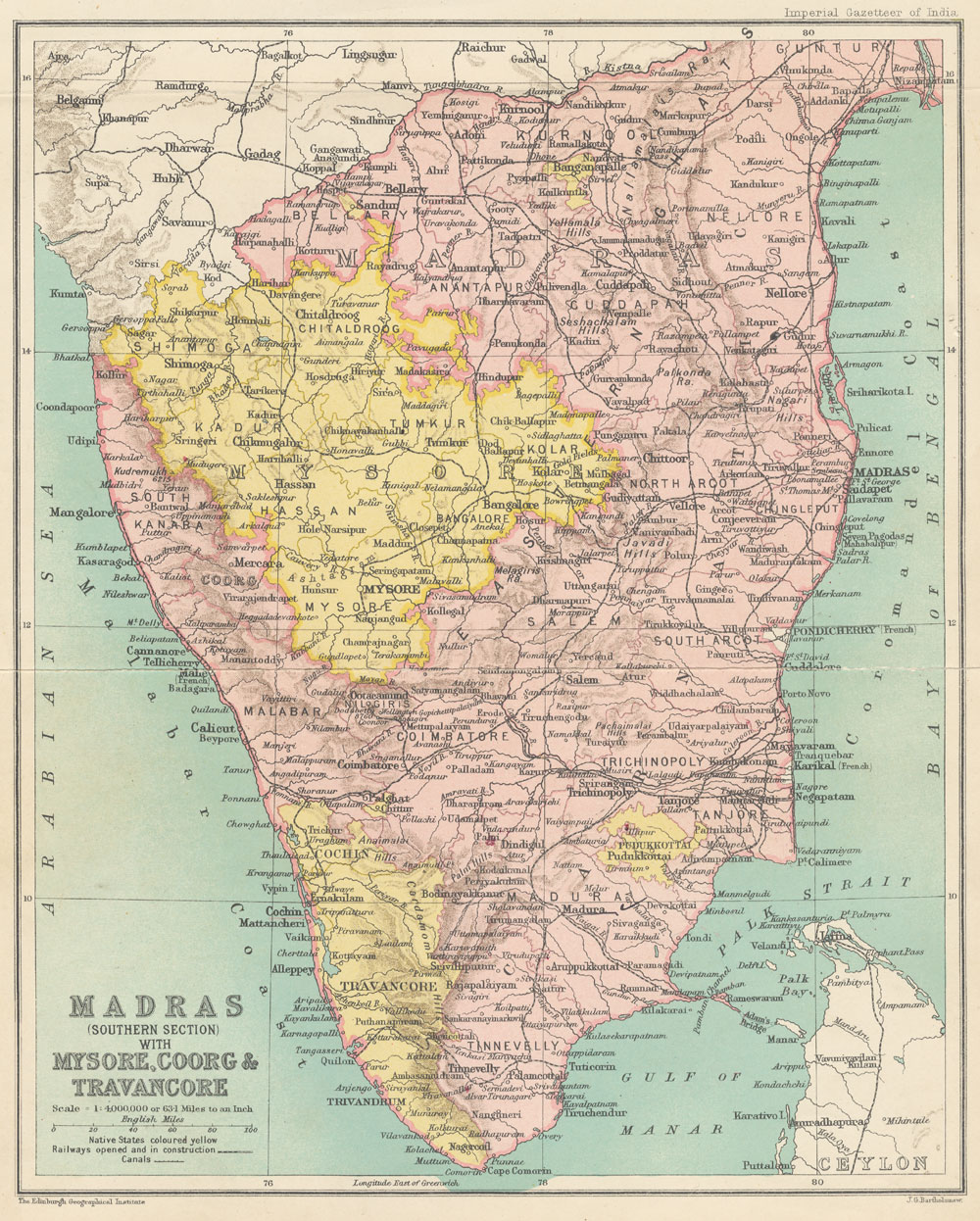
The Madras Presidency was divided and merged with neighbouring princely states to produce Kerala, Tamil Nadu, Karnataka and Andhra Pradesh.

The Instruments of Accession were limited, transferring control of only three matters to India, and would by themselves have produced a rather loose federation, with significant differences in administration and governance across the various states. Full political integration, in contrast, would require a process whereby the political actors in the various states were "persuaded to shift their loyalties, expectations, and political activities towards a new center", namely, the Republic of India. This was not an easy task. While some princely states such as Mysore had legislative systems of governance that were based on a broad franchise and not significantly different from those of British India, in others, political decision-making took place in small, limited aristocratic circles and governance was, as a result, at best paternalistic and at worst the result of courtly intrigue. Having secured the accession of the princely states, the Government of India between 1948 and 1950 turned to the task of welding the states and the former British provinces into one polity under a single republican constitution.

=== Fast-track integration ===
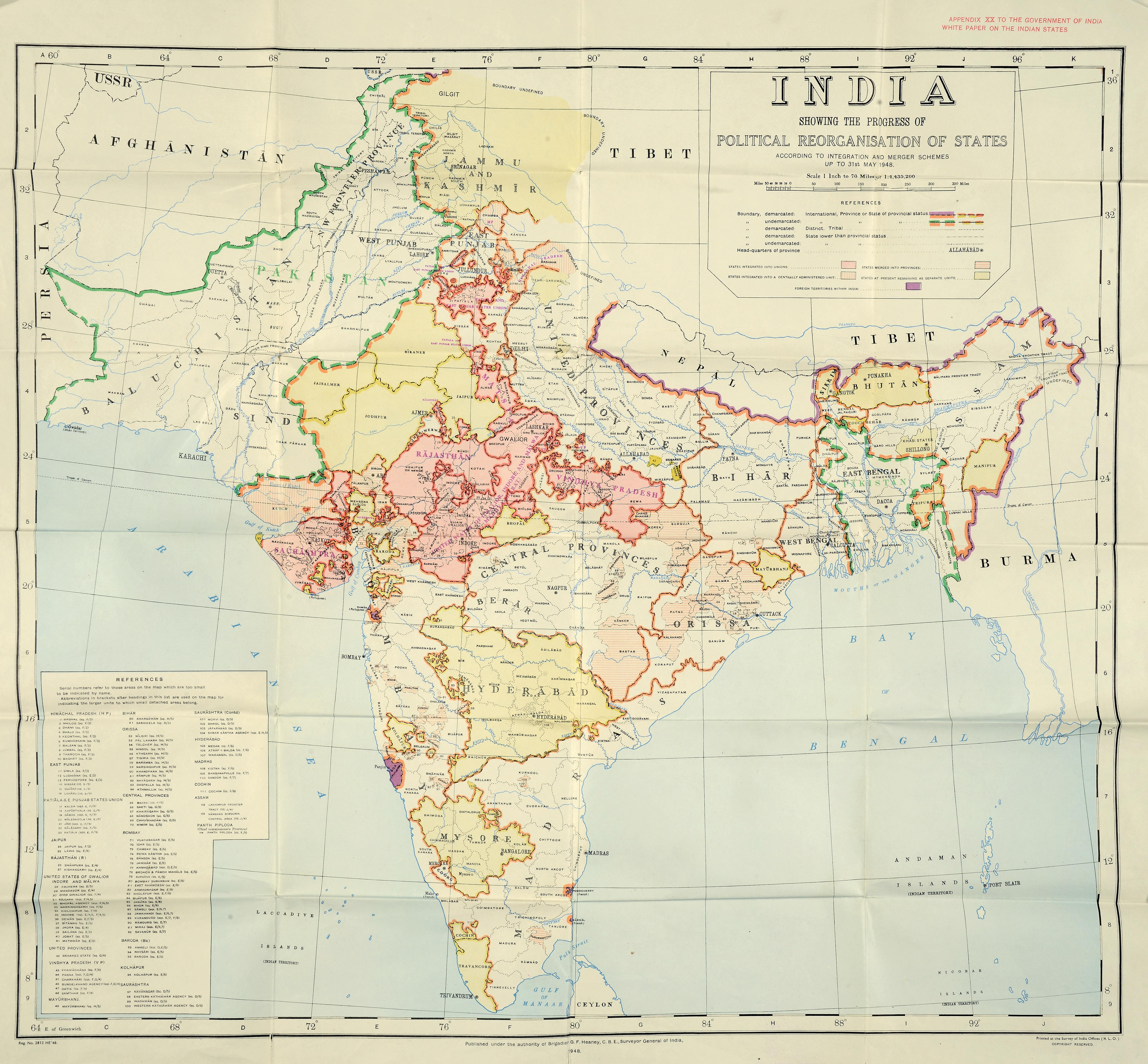
Reorganization process as of 31st May 1948.

The first step in this process, carried out between 1947 and 1950, was to merge the smaller states that were not seen by the Government of India to be viable administrative units either into neighbouring provinces, or with other princely states to create "princely unions". This policy was contentious since it involved the dissolution of the very states whose existence India had only recently guaranteed by Mountbatten and the Indian leaders. Patel and Menon emphasised that without integration, the economies of states would collapse, and anarchy would arise if the princes were unable to provide democracy and govern properly. They pointed out that many of the smaller states were very small and lacked resources to sustain their economies and support their growing populations. Many also imposed tax rules and other restrictions impeding free trade with provinces, which had to be dismantled in a united India.

Given that the merger involved the breach of guarantees personally given by Mountbatten, initially, Patel and Nehru intended to wait until after his term as Governor-General ended. An adivasi uprising in Orissa in late 1947, however, forced their hand. In December 1947, princes from the Eastern India Agency and Chhattisgarh Agency were summoned to an all-night meeting with Menon, where they were persuaded to sign Merger Agreements integrating their states into Orissa, the Central Provinces and Bihar with effect from 1 January 1948. Later that year, 66 states in Gujarat and the Deccan were merged into Bombay, including the large states of Kolhapur and Baroda. Other small states were merged into Madras, East Punjab, West Bengal, the United Provinces and Assam. Not all states that signed Merger Agreements were integrated into provinces, however. Thirty states of the former Punjab Hill States Agency which lay near the international border and had signed Merger Agreements were integrated into Himachal Pradesh, a distinct entity that was administered directly by the centre as a Chief Commissioner's Province, for reasons of security.

A second kind of 'merger' agreement was demanded from states along sensitive border areas: Kutch in western India, and Tripura and Manipur in Northeast India. They were not merged into other units but retained as Chief Commissioners' Provinces under central government control. Bhopal, whose ruler was proud of the efficiency of his administration and feared that it would lose its identity if merged with the neighbouring Maratha states, also became a Chief Commissioner's Province, as did Bilaspur, much of which was likely to be flooded on completion of the Bhakra dam.

The Merger Agreements required rulers to cede "full and exclusive jurisdiction and powers for and in relation to governance" of their state to the Dominion of India. In return for their agreement to entirely cede their states, it gave princes many guarantees. Princes would receive an annual payment from the Indian government in the form of a privy purse as compensation for the surrender of their powers and the dissolution of their states. While state property would be taken over, their private property would be protected, as would all personal privileges, dignities and titles. Succession was also guaranteed according to custom. In addition, the provincial administration was obliged to take on the staff of the princely states with guarantees of equal pay and treatment.

=== Four-step integration ===
==== Merger ====
The bulk of the larger states, and some groups of small states, were integrated through a different, four-step process. The first step in this process was to convince adjacent large states and a large number of adjacent small states to combine to form a "princely union" through the execution by their rulers of Covenants of Merger. Under the Covenants of Merger, all rulers lost their ruling powers, save one who became the Rajpramukh of the new union. The other rulers were associated with two bodies—the council of rulers, whose members were the rulers of salute states, and a presidium, one or more of whose members were elected by the rulers of non-salute states, with the rest elected by the council. The Rajpramukh and his deputy Uprajpramukh were chosen by the council from among the members of the presidium. The Covenants made provision for the creation of a constituent assembly for the new union which would be charged with framing its constitution. In return for agreeing to the extinction of their states as discrete entities, the rulers were given a privy purse and guarantees similar to those provided under the Merger Agreements.

Through this process, Patel obtained the unification of 222 states in the Kathiawar peninsula of his native Gujarat into the princely union of Saurashtra in January 1948, with six more states joining the union the following year. Madhya Bharat emerged on 28 May 1948 from a union of Gwalior, Indore and eighteen smaller states. In Punjab, the Patiala and East Punjab States Union was formed on 15 July 1948 from Patiala, Kapurthala, Jind, Nabha, Faridkot, Malerkotla, Nalargarh, and Kalsia. The United State of Rajasthan was formed as the result of a series of mergers, the last of which was completed on 15 May 1949. Travancore and Cochin were merged in the middle of 1949 to form the princely union of Travancore-Cochin. The only princely states which signed neither Covenants of Merger nor Merger Agreements were Kashmir, Mysore and Hyderabad.

==== Democratisation ====
Merging the administrative machineries of each state and integrating them into one political and administrative entity was not easy, particularly as many of the merged states had a history of rivalry. In the former Central India Agency, whose princely states had initially been merged into a princely union called Vindhya Pradesh, the rivalry between two groups of states became so bad that the Government of India persuaded the rulers to sign a Merger Agreement abrogating the old Covenants of Merger, and took direct control of the state as a Chief Commissioner's State. As such, the mergers did not meet the expectations of the Government of India or the States Department. In December 1947, Menon suggested requiring the rulers of states to take "practical steps towards the establishment of popular government". The States Department accepted his suggestion, and implemented it through a special covenant signed by the rajpramukhs of the merged princely unions, binding them to act as constitutional monarchs. This meant that their powers were de facto no different from those of the Governors of the former British provinces, thus giving the people of their territories the same measure of responsible government as the people of the rest of India.

The result of this process has been described as being, in effect, an assertion of paramountcy by the Government of India over the states in a more pervasive form. While this contradicted the British statement that paramountcy would lapse on the transfer of power, the Congress position had always been that independent India would inherit the position of being the paramount power.

States of India in 1950

==== Centralisation and constitutionalisation ====
Democratisation still left open one important distinction between the former princely states and the former British provinces, namely, that since the princely states had signed limited Instruments of Accession covering only three subjects, they were insulated from government policies in other areas. The Congress viewed this as hampering its ability to frame policies that brought about social justice and national development. Consequently, they sought to secure to the central government the same degree of powers over the former princely states as it had over the former British provinces. In May 1948, at the initiative of V. P. Menon, a meeting was held in Delhi between the Rajpramukhs of the princely unions and the States Department, at the end of which the Rajpramukhs signed new Instruments of Accession which gave the Government of India the power to pass laws in respect of all matters that fell within the seventh schedule of the Government of India Act 1935. Subsequently, each of the princely unions, as well as Mysore and Hyderabad, agreed to adopt the Constitution of India as the constitution of that state, thus ensuring that they were placed in exactly the same legal position vis-à-vis the central government as the former British provinces. Until Article 370 of the Constitution of India was abrogated, the only exception was Kashmir, whose relationship with India continued to be governed by the original Instrument of Accession, and the constitution produced by the state's Constituent Assembly.

Effective from 1950, the Constitution of India classified the constituent units of India into three classes—Part A, B, and C states. The former British provinces, together with the princely states that had been merged into them, were the Part A states. The princely unions, plus Mysore and Hyderabad, were the Part B states. The former Chief Commissioners' Provinces and other centrally administered areas, except the Andaman and Nicobar Islands, were the Part C states. The only practical difference between the Part A states and the Part B states was that the constitutional heads of the Part B states were the Rajpramukhs appointed under the terms of the Covenants of Merger, rather than Governors appointed by the central government. In addition, Constitution gave the central government a significant range of powers over the former princely states, providing amongst other things that "their governance shall be under the general control of, and comply with such particular directions, if any, as may from time to time be given by, the President". Apart from that, the form of government in both was identical.

==== Reorganisation ====
The distinction between Part A and Part B states was only intended to last for a brief, transitional period. In 1956, the States Reorganisation Act reorganised the former British provinces and princely states on the basis of language. Simultaneously, the Seventh Amendment to the Constitution removed the distinction between Part A and Part B states, both of which were now treated only as "states", with Part C states being designated as "union territories". The Rajpramukhs lost their authority, and were replaced as the constitutional heads of state by Governors, who were appointed by the central government. These changes finally brought the princely order to an end. In both legal and practical terms, the territories that had been part of the princely states were now fully integrated into India and did not differ in any way from those that had been part of British India. The personal privileges of the princes—the privy purse, the exemption from customs duty, and customary dignities—survived, only to be abolished in 1971.

== Post-integration issues ==
=== The princes ===
Although the progressive integration of the princely states into India was largely peaceful, not all princes were happy with the outcome. Many had expected the Instruments of Accession to be permanent, and were unhappy about losing the autonomy and the guaranteed continued existence of their states they had expected to gain. Some felt uneasy about the disappearance of states that generations of their family had controlled, while others were unhappy about the disappearance of administrative structures they had worked hard to build up and which they believed to be efficient. The majority, however, despite the "strain and tension" of adapting to life as private citizens, were content to retire on the generous pension provided by the privy purse. Several took advantage of their eligibility to hold public offices under the central government. The Maharaja of Bhavnagar, Col. Krishna Kumarasingh Bhavasingh Gohil, for example, became the Governor of Madras State, and several others were appointed to diplomatic posts overseas.

=== Colonial enclaves ===
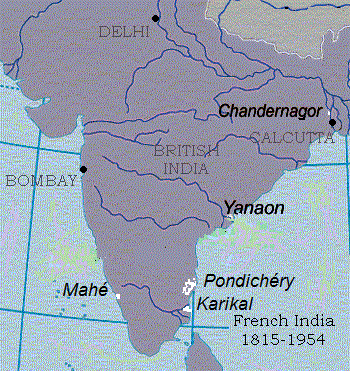
The French enclaves in 1947

The integration of the princely states raised the question of the future of the remaining colonial enclaves in the Indian subcontinent. At independence, the regions of Pondicherry, Karaikal, Yanam, Mahe and Chandernagore were still colonies of France, and Daman and Diu, Dadra and Nagar Haveli and Goa remained colonies of Portugal. An agreement between France and India in 1948 provided for an election in France's remaining possessions in South Asia to choose their political future. A plebiscite held in Chandernagore on 19 June 1949 resulted in a vote of 7,463 to 114 in favour of being integrated with India. It was ceded to India on a de facto basis on 14 August 1949 and de jure on 2 May 1950. In the other enclaves, however, the pro-French camp, led by Edouard Goubert, used the administrative machinery to suppress the pro-merger groups. Popular discontent rose, and in 1954 demonstrations in Yanam and Mahe resulted in pro-merger groups assuming power. A referendum in Pondicherry and Karaikal in October 1954 resulted in a vote in favour of merger, and on 1 November 1954, de facto control over all four enclaves was transferred to the Republic of India. A treaty of cession was signed in May 1956, and following ratification by the French National Assembly in May 1962, de jure control of the enclaves was also transferred.

Demonstrators demanding the integration of Goa into India march against the Portuguese on 15 August 1955.

Portugal, in contrast, resisted diplomatic solutions. It viewed its continued possession of its enclaves in the Indian subcontinent as a matter of national pride and, in 1951, it amended its constitution to convert its possessions in India into Portuguese provinces. In July 1954, an uprising in Dadra and Nagar Haveli threw off Portuguese rule. The Portuguese attempted to send forces from Daman to reoccupy the enclaves, but were prevented from doing so by Indian troops. Portugal initiated proceedings before the International Court of Justice to compel India to allow its troops access to the enclave, but the Court rejected its complaint in 1960, holding that India was within its rights in denying Portugal military access. In 1961, the Constitution of India was amended to incorporate Dadra and Nagar Haveli into India as a Union Territory.

Goa, Daman and Diu remained an outstanding issue. On 15 August 1955, five thousand non-violent demonstrators marched against the Portuguese at the border, and were met with gunfire, killing 22. In December 1960, the United Nations General Assembly rejected Portugal's contention that its overseas possessions were provinces, and formally listed them as "non-self-governing territories". Although Nehru continued to favour a negotiated solution, the Portuguese suppression of a revolt in Angola in 1961 radicalised Indian public opinion, and increased the pressure on the Government of India to take military action. African leaders, too, put pressure on Nehru to take action in Goa, which they argued would save Africa from further horrors. On 18 December 1961, following the collapse of an American attempt to find a negotiated solution, the Indian Army entered Portuguese India and defeated the Portuguese garrisons there. The Portuguese took the matter to the Security Council but a resolution calling on India to withdraw its troops immediately was defeated by the USSR's veto. Portugal surrendered on 19 December. This take-over ended the last of the European colonies in the Indian subcontinent. Goa was incorporated into India as a centrally administered union territory and, in 1987, became a state.

== Sikkim ==
The former princely state of Sikkim, located at a strategically important point on the border between India and China, was integrated into India in 1975 as its 22nd state.

Nepal, Bhutan and Sikkim were Himalayan states bordering India. Nepal had been recognised by the British by Nepal–Britain Treaty of 1923 as being de jure independent and not a princely state. Bhutan had in the British period been considered a protectorate outside the international frontier of India. The Government of India entered into a treaty with Bhutan in 1949 continuing this arrangement, and providing that Bhutan would abide by the advice of the Government of India in the conduct of its external affairs. After 1947, India signed new treaties with Nepal and Bhutan.

Historically, Sikkim was a British dependency, with a status similar to that of the other princely states, and was therefore considered to be within the frontiers of India in the colonial period. On independence, however, the Chogyal of Sikkim resisted full integration into India. Given the region's strategic importance to India, the Government of India signed first a Standstill Agreement and then in 1950 a full treaty with the Chogyal of Sikkim which in effect made it a protectorate which was no longer part of India. India had responsibility for defence, external affairs and communications, and ultimate responsibility for law and order, but Sikkim was otherwise given full internal autonomy. In the late 1960s and early 1970s, the Chogyal Palden Thondup Namgyal, supported by the minority Bhutia and Lepcha upper classes, attempted to negotiate greater powers, particularly over external affairs, to give Sikkim more of an international personality. These policies were opposed by Kazi Lhendup Dorji and the Sikkim State Congress, who represented the ethnic Nepali middle classes and took a more pro-Indian view.

In April 1973, anti-Chogyal agitation broke out and protestors demanded popular elections. The Sikkim police were unable to control the demonstrations, and Dorji asked India to exercise its responsibility for law and order and intervene. India facilitated negotiations between the Chogyal and Dorji, and produced an agreement, which envisaged the reduction of the Chogyal to the role of a constitutional monarch and the holding of elections based on a new ethnic power-sharing formula. The Chogyal's opponents won an overwhelming victory, and a new Constitution was drafted providing for Sikkim to be associated with the Republic of India. On 10 April 1975, the Sikkim Assembly passed a resolution calling for the state to be fully integrated into India. This resolution was endorsed by 97 percent of the vote in a referendum held on 14 April 1975, following which the Indian Parliament amended the constitution to admit Sikkim into India as its 22nd state.

=== Secessionism and sub-nationalism ===
While the majority of princely states absorbed into India have been fully integrated, a few outstanding issues remain. The most prominent of these is in relation to Jammu and Kashmir, where a secessionist insurgency has been raging since 1989.

Some academics suggest that the insurgency is at least partly a result of the manner in which it was integrated into India. Kashmir, uniquely amongst princely states, was not required to sign either a Merger Agreement or a revised Instrument of Accession giving India control over a larger number of issues than the three originally provided for. Instead, the power to make laws relating to Kashmir was granted to the Government of India by Article 5 of the Constitution of Jammu and Kashmir and was, under Article 370 of the Constitution of India, somewhat more restricted than in relation to other states. Widmalm argues that during the 1980s, a number of Kashmiri youth began to feel that the Indian government was increasingly interfering in the politics of Jammu and Kashmir. The elections of 1987 caused them to lose faith in the political process and begin the violent insurgency which is still ongoing. Similarly, Ganguly suggests that the policies of the Indian government towards Kashmir meant that the state, unlike other parts of India, never developed the solid political institutions associated with a modern multi-ethnic democracy. As a result, the growing dissatisfaction with the status quo felt by an increasingly politically aware youth was expressed through non-political channels which Pakistan, seeking to weaken India's hold over Kashmir, transformed into an active insurgency.

Separatist movements also exist in two other former princely states located in Northeast India— Tripura and Manipur, though insurgency in Tripura has been crushed the insurgency in Manipur continues on. However, these separatist movements are generally treated by scholars as being part of the broader problem of insurgencies in North-east India, rather being a result of specific problems in integrating the princely states into India, as the Kashmir problem is and, in particular, to reflect the failure of the Government of India to adequately address the aspirations of tribal groups in the Northeast, or to tackle the tensions arising from the immigration of people from other parts of India to the north-eastern areas.

The integration of former princely states with other provinces to form new states has also given rise to some issues. The Telangana region, comprising the Telugu-speaking districts of the former Hyderabad State, were in many ways different from the Telugu-speaking areas of British India with which they were merged. In recognition of these differences, the States Reorganisation Commission originally recommended that Telangana be created as a separate state, rather than as part of a broader Telugu-speaking entity. This recommendation was rejected by the Government of India, and Telangana was merged into Andhra Pradesh. The result was the emergence in the 1960s of a movement demanding a separate Telangana state. The demand has been accepted by the Union Government, leading to formation of Telangana as the 29th state of India in June 2014. A similar movement, although less strong, exists in the Vidarbha region of Maharashtra, which consists of the former Nagpur state and the Berar region of the former Hyderabad state.

== Critical perspectives on the process of integration ==
The integration process repeatedly brought Indian and Pakistani leaders into conflict. During negotiations, Jinnah, representing the Muslim League, strongly supported the right of the princely states to remain independent, joining neither India nor Pakistan, an attitude which was diametrically opposed to the stance taken by Nehru and the Congress and which was reflected in Pakistan's support of Hyderabad's bid to stay independent. Post-partition, the Government of Pakistan accused India of hypocrisy on the ground that there was little difference between the accession of the ruler of Junagadh to Pakistan—which India refused to recognise—and the accession of the Maharajah of Kashmir to India, and for several years refused to recognise the legality of India's incorporation of Junagadh, treating it as de jure Pakistani territory.

Different theories have been proposed to explain the designs of Indian and Pakistani leaders in this period. Rajmohan Gandhi postulates that an ideal deal working in the mind of Patel was that if Muhammad Ali Jinnah let India have Junagadh and Hyderabad, Patel would not object to Kashmir acceding to Pakistan. In his book Patel: A Life, Gandhi asserts that Jinnah sought to engage the questions of Junagadh and Hyderabad in the same battle. It is suggested that he wanted India to ask for a plebiscite in Junagadh and Hyderabad, knowing thus that the principle then would have to be applied to Kashmir, where the Muslim-majority would, he believed, vote for Pakistan. A speech by Patel at the Bahauddin College in Junagadh following the latter's take-over, where he said that "we would agree to Kashmir if they agreed to Hyderabad", suggests that he may have been amenable to this idea. Although Patel's opinions were not India's policy, nor were they shared by Nehru, both leaders were angered at Jinnah's courting the princes of Jodhpur, Bhopal and Indore, leading them to take a harder stance on a possible deal with Pakistan.

Modern historians have also re-examined the role of the States Department and Lord Mountbatten during the accession process. Ian Copland argues that the Congress leaders did not intend the settlement contained in the Instruments of Accession to be permanent even when they were signed, and at all times privately contemplated a complete integration of the sort that ensued between 1948 and 1950. He points out that the mergers and cession of powers to the Government of India between 1948 and 1950 contravened the terms of the Instruments of Accession, and were incompatible with the express assurances of internal autonomy and preservation of the princely states which Mountbatten had given the princes. Menon in his memoirs stated that the changes to the initial terms of accession were in every instance freely consented to by the princes with no element of coercion. Copland disagrees, on the basis that foreign diplomats at the time believed that the princes had been given no choice but to sign, and that a few princes expressed their unhappiness with the arrangements. He also criticises Mountbatten's role, saying that while he stayed within the letter of the law, he was at least under a moral obligation to do something for the princes when it became apparent that the Government of India was going to alter the terms on which accession took place, and that he should never have lent his support to the bargain given that it could not be guaranteed after independence. Both Copland and Ramusack argue that, in the ultimate analysis, one of the reasons why the princes consented to the demise of their states was that they felt abandoned by the British, and saw themselves as having little other option. Older historians such as Lumby, in contrast, take the view that the princely states could not have survived as independent entities after the transfer of power, and that their demise was inevitable. They therefore view successful integration of all princely states into India as a triumph for the Government of India and Lord Mountbatten, and as a tribute to the sagacity of the majority of princes, who jointly achieved in a few months what the Empire had attempted, unsuccessfully, to do for over a century—unite all of India under one rule.

== See also ==
- All Indian States People's Conference
- List of princely states of British India

== Sources ==
- Ashton, S.R. (1982), British Policy towards the Indian States, 1905–1938, London Studies on South Asia no. 2, London: Curzon Press, ISBN 0-7007-0146-X
- Brown, Judith M. (1984), "The Mountbatten Viceroyalty. Announcement and Reception of the 3 June Plan, 31 May-7 July 1947", The English Historical Review, 99 (392): 667–668, doi:10.1093/ehr/XCIX.CCCXCII.667
- Copland, Ian (1987), "Congress Paternalism: The "High Command" and the Struggle for Freedom in Princely India"", in Masselos, Jim (ed.), Struggling and Ruling: The Indian National Congress 1885–1985, New Delhi: Sterling Publishers, pp. 121–140, ISBN 81-207-0691-9
- Copland, Ian (1993), "Lord Mountbatten and the Integration of the Indian States: A Reappraisal", The Journal of Imperial and Commonwealth History, 21 (2): 385–408, doi:10.1080/03086539308582896
- Copland, Ian (1997), The Princes of India in the Endgame of Empire, 1917–1947, Cambridge, England: Cambridge University Press, ISBN 0-521-57179-0
- Eagleton, Clyde (1950), "The Case of Hyderabad Before the Security Council", The American Journal of International Law, 44 (2), American Society of International Law: 277–302, doi:10.2307/2193757, JSTOR 2193757
- Fifield, Russell H. (1950), "The Future of French India", Far Eastern Review, 19 (6): 62–64, doi:10.2307/3024284, JSTOR 3024284
- Fifield, Russell H. (1952), "New States in the Indian Realm", The American Journal of International Law, 46 (3), American Society of International Law: 450–463, doi:10.2307/2194500, JSTOR 2194500, S2CID 147372554
- Fisher, Margaret W. (1962), "Goa in Wider Perspective", Asian Survey, 2 (2): 3–10, doi:10.2307/3023422, JSTOR 3023422
- Fisher, Michael H. (1984), "Indirect Rule in the British Empire: The Foundations of the Residency System in India (1764–1858)", Modern Asian Studies, 18 (3): 393–428, doi:10.1017/S0026749X00009033, S2CID 145053107
- Furber, Holden (1951), "The Unification of India, 1947–1951", Pacific Affairs, 24 (4), Pacific Affairs, University of British Columbia: 352–371, doi:10.2307/2753451, JSTOR 2753451
- Gandhi, Rajmohan (1991), Patel: A Life, Ahmedabad: Navajivan Publishing House
- Ganguly, Sumit (1996), "Explaining the Kashmir Insurgency: Political Mobilization and Institutional Decay", International Security, 21 (2), The MIT Press: 76–107, doi:10.2307/2539071, JSTOR 2539071
- Gledhill, Alan (1957), "Constitutional and Legislative Development in the Indian Republic", Bulletin of the School of Oriental and African Studies, University of London, 20 (1–3): 267–278, doi:10.1017/S0041977X00061838, S2CID 154488404
- Gray, Hugh (1971), "The Demand for a Separate Telangana State in India" (PDF), Asian Survey, 11 (5): 463–474, doi:10.2307/2642982, JSTOR 2642982
- Guha, Amalendu (1984), "Nationalism: Pan-Indian and Regional in a Historical Perspective", Social Scientist, 12 (2): 42–65, doi:10.2307/3517093, JSTOR 3517093
- Gupta, Ranjan (1975), "Sikkim: The Merger with India", Asian Survey, 15 (9): 786–798, doi:10.2307/2643174, JSTOR 2643174
- Hardgrave, Robert L. (1983), "The Northeast, the Punjab, and the Regionalization of Indian Politics", Asian Survey, 23 (11): 1171–1181, doi:10.2307/2644366, hdl:2152/34400, JSTOR 2644366, S2CID 153480249
- Karan, Pradyumna P. (1960), "A Free Access to Colonial Enclaves", Annals of the Association of American Geographers, 50 (2): 188–190, doi:10.1111/j.1467-8306.1960.tb00345.x
- Keith, Arthur Berriedale (1969), A Constitutional History of India, 1600–1935 (2nd ed.), London: Methuen
- Lee-Warner, Sir William (1910), "The Native States of India", The Geographical Journal, 36 (6) (2nd ed.), London: Macmillan: 721, Bibcode:1910GeogJ..36..721L, doi:10.2307/1776856, hdl:2027/uc1.b3849349, JSTOR 1776856
- Lumby, E.W.R. (1954), The Transfer of Power in India, 1945–1947, London: George Allen and Unwin
- McLeod, John (1999), Sovereignty, Power, Control: Politics in the State of Western India, 1916–1947, Leiden: Brill, ISBN 90-04-11343-6
- Menon, V. P. (1956), The Story of the Integration of the Indian States, New York: Macmillan – via archive.org
- Metcalf, Barbara D.; Metcalf, Thomas R. (2006), A Concise History of India (2nd ed.), Cambridge University Press, ISBN 978-0521682251
- Mitra, Subrata Kumar (2006), The Puzzle of India's Governance: Culture, Context and Comparative Theory, London: Routledge, ISBN 0-415-34861-7
- Moore, R.J. (1983), Escape from Empire: The Attlee Government and the Indian Problem, Oxford: Clarendon Press, ISBN 0-19-822688-8
- Morris-Jones, W.H. (1983), "Thirty-Six Years Later: The Mixed Legacies of Mountbatten's Transfer of Power", International Affairs, 59 (4): 621–628, doi:10.2307/2619473, JSTOR 2619473
- Mosley, Leonard (1961), The last days of the British Raj, London: Weidenfeld & Nicolson
- Noorani, A. G. (3–16 March 2001), "Of a massacre untold", Frontline, 18 (5)
- Note (1975), "Current Legal Developments: Sikkim, Constituent Unit of India", International and Comparative Law Quarterly, 24 (4): 884, doi:10.1093/iclqaj/24.4.884
- Phadnis, Urmila (1968), Towards the Integration of the Indian States, 1919–1947, London: Asia Publishing House
- Phadnis, Urmila (1969), "Gandhi and Indian States: A Probe in Strategy", in Biswas, S.C. (ed.), Gandhi: Theory and Practice, Social Impact and Contemporary Relevance, Transactions of the Indian Institute of Advanced Study Vol. 2, Shimla: Indian Institute of Advanced Study, pp. 360–374
- Potter, Pitman B. (1950), "The Principal Legal and Political Problems Involved in the Kashmir Case", The American Journal of International Law, 44 (2), American Society of International Law: 361–363, doi:10.2307/2193764, JSTOR 2193764, S2CID 146848599
- Puchalapalli, Sundarayya (March 1973), "Telangana People's Armed Struggle, 1946–1951. Part Two: First Phase and Its Lessons", Social Scientist, 1 (8): 18–42, doi:10.2307/3516214, JSTOR 3516214, archived from the original on 3 February 2014
- Ramusack, Barbara N. (1978), The Princes of India in the Twilight of Empire: Dissolution of a patron-client system, 1914–1939, Columbus, Ohio: Ohio State University Press, ISBN 0-8142-0272-1
- Ramusack, Barbara N. (1988), "Congress and the People's Movement in Princely India: Ambivalence in Strategy and Organisation", in Sisson, Richard; Wolpert, Stanley (eds.), Congress and Indian Nationalism, Berkeley: University of California Press, pp. 377–403, ISBN 0-520-06041-5
- Ramusack, Barbara N. (2004), The Indian Princes and Their States, The New Cambridge History of India III.6, Cambridge, England: Cambridge University Press, ISBN 0-521-26727-7
- Rangaswami, Vanaja (1981), The Story of Integration: A New Interpretation in the Context of the Democratic Movements in the Princely States of Mysore, Travancore and Cochin 1900–1947, New Delhi: Manohar
- Roberts, Neal A. (1972), "The Supreme Court in a Developing Society: Progressive or Reactionary Force? A Study of the Privy Purse Case in India", The American Journal of Comparative Law, 20 (1), American Society of Comparative Law: 79–110, doi:10.2307/839489, JSTOR 839489
- Security Council (1957), "Security Council: India-Pakistan Question", International Organization, 11 (2): 368–372, doi:10.1017/S0020818300023808, S2CID 249408902
- Singh, Buta. "Role of Sardar Patel in the Integration of Indian States." Calcutta Historical Journal (July-Dec 2008) 28#2 pp 65–78.
- Singh, B.P. (1987), "North-East India: Demography, Culture and Identity Crisis", Modern Asian Studies, 21 (2): 257–282, doi:10.1017/S0026749X00013809, S2CID 145737466
- Spate, O.H.K. (1948), "The Partition of India and the Prospects of Pakistan", Geographical Review, 38 (1), American Geographical Society: 5–29, Bibcode:1948GeoRv..38....5S, doi:10.2307/210736, JSTOR 210736
- Talbot, Phillips (1949), "Kashmir and Hyderabad", World Politics, 1 (3), Cambridge University Press: 321–332, doi:10.2307/2009033, JSTOR 2009033, S2CID 154496730
- Thomson, Mike (24 September 2013), Hyderabad 1948: India's hidden massacre, BBC
- Vincent, Rose (1990), The French in India: From Diamond Traders to Sanskrit Scholars, Bombay: Popular Prakashan, translated by Latika Padgaonkar
- Wainwright, A. M. (1994), Inheritance of Empire: Britain, India and the Balance of Power in Asia, 1938–55, Westport: Praeger, ISBN 0-275-94733-5
- Widmalm, Sten (1997), "The Rise and Fall of Democracy in Jammu and Kashmir", Asian Survey, 37 (11): 1005–1030, doi:10.2307/2645738, JSTOR 2645738
- Wright, Quincy (1962), "The Goa Incident", The American Journal of International Law, 56 (3), American Society of International Law: 617–632, doi:10.2307/2196501, JSTOR 2196501, S2CID 147417854
- Wood, John (1984), "British versus Princely Legacies and the Political Integration of Gujarat", The Journal of Asian Studies, 44 (1): 65–99, doi:10.2307/2056747, JSTOR 2056747, S2CID 154751565
- Zutshi, Chitralekha (2017). "Seasons of Discontent and Revolt in Kashmir". Current History. 116 (789): 123–129. doi:10.1525/curh.2017.116.789.123. ISSN 0011-3530. JSTOR 48614247.
- Wood, John; Moon, Penderel; Blake, David M.; Ashton, Stephen R. (1985), "Dividing the Jewel: Mountbatten and the Transfer of Power to India and Pakistan", Pacific Affairs, 58 (4), Pacific Affairs, University of British Columbia: 653–662, doi:10.2307/2758474, JSTOR 2758474
