= Bulusu =

Bulusu is a Telugu surname. It is common among Telugu Brahmins of the Vaidiki Velanadu subcaste

- Bulusu Aparna, Sanskrit Scholar and Telugh Avadhanini, West Godavari District
- Bulusu Appanna Shastri, Sanskrit Scholar, Bhatnavilli, East Godavari District
- Bulusu Nirupama, Computer Scientist, Oregon USA
- Bulusu Sambamurti, Indian lawyer, politician and freedom-fighter
- Bulusu Somayajulu, Mathematician; Kakinada who authored several books in Mathematics for Telugu Akademi and Punjab University.
- Bulusu Subrahmanyam Sastrulu of Bouloussou family; Diwan, Conseiller and Judge Advocate during French colonial rule in Yanaon
- Bulusu Surya Prakasha Sastry, Sanskrit Scholar; Tenali who was the founder of Sadhana Grandha Mandali
- Bulusu Venkata Satyanarayana Murty, Sanskrit Scholar
- Bulusu Venkateswarlu, Telugu Scholar; Philosopher; Kakinada
