= Bulusu Sambamurthy =

Indian lawyer, politician, and freedom fighter

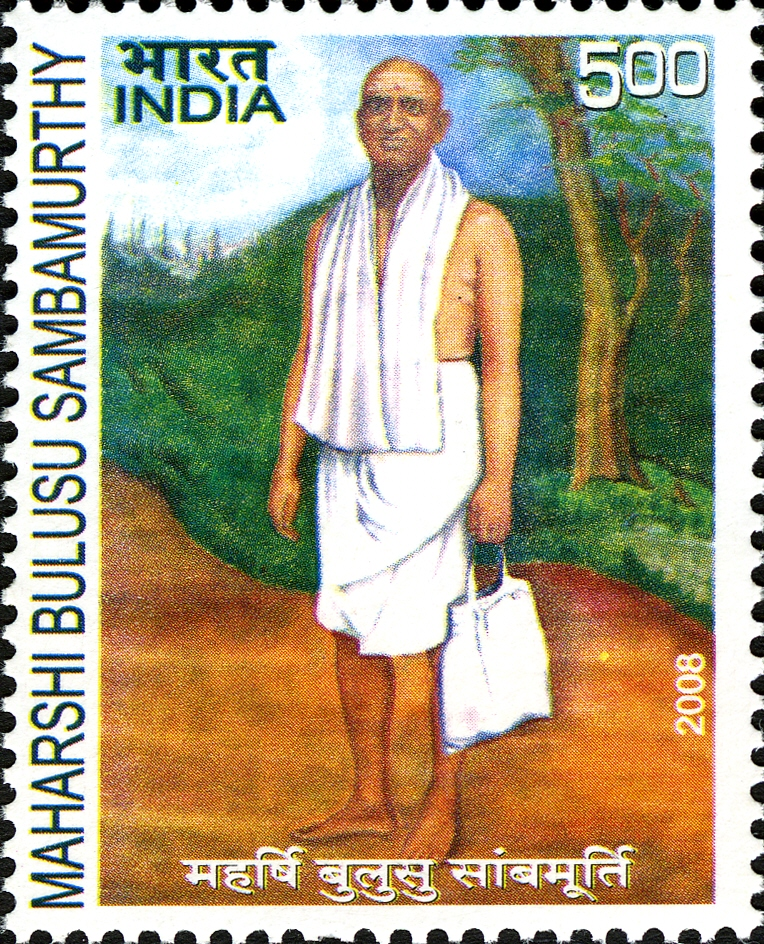
- Sambamurthy on a 2008 stamp of India

President of the Madras Legislative Council
- In office 18 July 1937 – 1942
- Preceded by: B. Ramachandra Reddi
- Succeeded by: U Rama Rao

Personal details
- Born: 4 March 1886 Dulla, East Godavari district, Andhra Pradesh, India
- Died: 2 February 1958 (aged 71) Kakinada, Andhra Pradesh, India
- Party: Indian National Congress
- Profession: Politician, Lawyer

Bulusu Sambamurthy (4 March 1886 – 2 February 1958) was an Indian lawyer, politician, and freedom fighter who played a key role in the Indian independence movement. He served as the President of the Madras Legislative Council from 1937 to 1942. Sambamurthy was also an advocate for the Andhra movement, which sought the creation of a separate Telugu-speaking state. He is often referred to by the honorific title of Maharshi Bulusu Sambamurthy for his wisdom and austere lifestyle.

== Early life ==
Sambamurthy was born on 4 March 1886 in a Telugu Vaidiki Velanadu Brahmin family in Dulla, East Godavari district, Madras Presidency. His father, Bulusu Subbavadhanulu, was a Vedic scholar. Sambamurthy completed his early education in his village and earned a degree in Physics from Maharajah's College, Vizianagaram. Initially working as a lecturer, he later pursued a law degree and became a lawyer in 1911, practicing in Cocanada (now Kakinada). He soon gained recognition as a prominent criminal lawyer, handling cases in Kakinada, Peddapuram, and Rajahmundry.

== Political career ==
In 1919, at the age of 33, he left his legal practice in response to Mahatma Gandhi's call and joined the Indian independence movement. His involvement in the Non-cooperation movement began in 1920 after he was inspired by a speech by Konda Venkatapayya Pantulu. Giving up his legal career, he committed himself to the freedom struggle, stating that "poverty is better than slavery" (దాస్యం కంటే దారిద్యం మేలు).

Sambamurthy adopted Gandhian principles and ways of life. In 1923, he became a member of the organizing committee of the Kakinada session of the Indian National Congress. He became one of the first leaders to demand Purna Swaraj (complete independence).

In 1930, Sambamurthy participated in the Salt Satyagraha at Chollangi, near Kakinada, and was arrested on 18 April 1930. He was imprisoned in Vellore Central Jail. In the 1937 Madras Presidency legislative assembly election, Sambamurthy successfully ran for office as a member of the Indian National Congress. He was subsequently appointed as President of the Madras Legislative Council, a position he held from 1937 to 1942. He resigned from the role in support of the Quit India Movement.

== Andhra movement ==
Sambamurthy was an ardent supporter of the Andhra movement, which called for the creation of a separate Telugu province. In 1952, during Potti Sreeramulu's fast unto death for the formation of Andhra, Sambamurthy offered his residence to Sreeramulu, showing his commitment to the cause. Despite his support, he did not receive the same recognition as others who later benefited from Sreeramulu's efforts.

In accordance with Gandhian principles, Sambamurthy adopted a simple lifestyle, wearing a loin cloth and forgoing a shirt. After losing his wife and retiring from public life, he spent his final years in poverty in Kakinada. Though initially a well-regarded figure, he was neglected in his later years. Eventually, financial assistance was provided by Govind Ballabh Pant, the then Union Minister, after learning about his hardships.

== Death ==
Bulusu Sambamurthy died on 2 February 1958 in Kakinada. His funeral was attended by prominent figures, including minister Anagani Bhagavanta Rao, A. Krishnaswami, and district collector Victor. Some others who paid condolences are Neelam Sanjeeva Reddy and Rajaji.

== Legacy ==
A street in Kakinada was named after him as Sambamurthy Nagar. In 2008, the Government of India issued a commemorative postage stamp in honour of Bulusu Sambamurthy.

== See also ==
- List of speakers of the Tamil Nadu Legislative Assembly

Government offices
Preceded by Chair Created	Speaker of Madras Legislative Assembly; 15 July 1937 – 25 July 1942	Succeeded by
