= Bezawada Ramachandra Reddy =

Indian politician

Member of Parliament, Lok Sabha for Nellore
- In office 1952–1957
- Prime Minister: Jawaharlal Nehru
- Preceded by: position established
- Succeeded by: Rebala Lakshminarasa Reddy

President of the Madras Legislative Council
- In office 6 November 1930 – 18 July 1937
- Preceded by: V. S. Narasimha Raju
- Succeeded by: Bulusu Sambamurti

Personal details
- Born: 24 November 1894 Kavali, Nellore District, Madras Presidency, British India (present-day Andhra Pradesh, India)
- Died: 19 March 1973 (aged 78) Buchireddipalem, Nellore District, Andhra Pradesh
- Party: Justice Party, Independent, Swatantra Party
- Spouse(s): Bezawada Seethamma and Bezawada Bujjamma
- Profession: Agriculturist, Politician

Bezawada Ramachandra Reddy CBE (24 November 1894 – 19 March 1973) was an Indian politician of the Justice Party and one of the founders of the Swatantra Party. He served as the President of the Madras Legislative Council from 1930 to 1937. Ramachandra Reddy was a relative of Indian National Congress politician Bezawada Gopala Reddy.

== Early life ==
Ramachandra Reddy was born on 24 November 1894 to Sri Subba Reddy & Kamala (Dodla) in Buchireddypalem in the Madras Presidency. He graduated from the Madras University in 1919 and immediately entered politics serving for a while as the President of the District Educational Council, Nellore. In 1929, he was elected President of the district board.

== Marriage ==
He married Dodla Sita, they had one male child who was named after his father Subba Reddy. On the death of first wife Sita who died post delivery, he married her half sister Dodla Bujjamma, they had 10 children, 5 sons & 5 daughters.

== In the Legislative Council ==
Reddy joined the Justice Party at an early age and won the 1923 elections. He also won the subsequent elections in 1926, 1930 and 1934. When the Justice Party captured power in the Presidency after a four-year-long gap, Reddy's name was proposed for election as President of the council. He was elected and served as the president of the Madras Legislative Council from 6 November 1930 to March 1937. Reddy resigned as Speaker following his defeat in the 1937 elections.

Reddy dissented with Periyar when he converted the political party into the Dravidar Kazhagam. Reddy was first elected President of the Justice Party soon after the split in 1944 before the mantle passed on P. T. Rajan. Reddy finally quit the party in 1952.

In 1952, Reddy contested the First Lok Sabha elections as an independent from Nellore and was successful. He served as a Member of the Lok Sabha from 1952 to 1957.

== Swatantra Party ==
On 4 June 1959, along with C. Rajagopalachari & N G Ranga and other senior politicians, Reddy floated the Swatantra Party. A party whose ideology was finally accepted by modern India when it started its liberalisation policy in the year 1991.

== Champion of Liberalisation ==
He always believed in enterprise and promoted the idea of setting up business. He served on the boards of many companies as an independent director upon the invitation of the promoters. He was on the board of Madras Cements, Andhra Scientific Company, Machilipatnam. Personally he never believed in putting his money in industry, as he always believed his roots are in agriculture and he should always be only an agriculturist.

== Death ==
Reddy died on 19 March 1973.

== Honours ==
Reddy was awarded a Commander of the Order of the British Empire (CBE) in the 1937 Coronation Honours.

Preceded by C. V. S. Narasimha Raju	President of the Madras Legislative Council; 1930-1937	Succeeded by Bulusu Sambamurti
Preceded by E. V. Ramasami	President of the Justice Party; 1944-1945	Succeeded by P. T. Rajan
Preceded by None	Member of Parliament (Lok Sabha) for Nellore; 1952-1957	Succeeded by R. Lakshminarasa Reddy
