= Purna Swaraj =

Proclamation of Indian independence from the British Empire published on 26 Jan. 1930

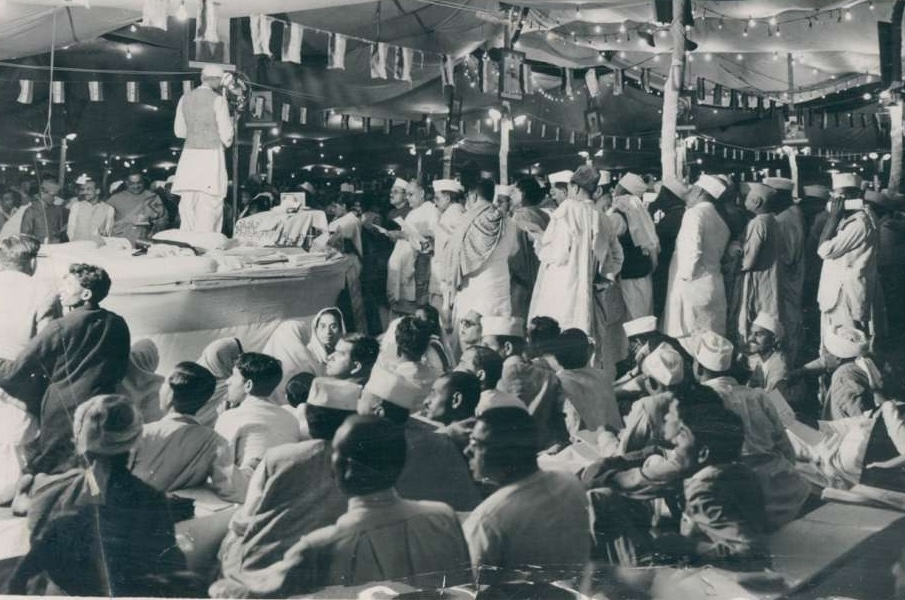
Jawaharlal Nehru presided over the INC Lahore session where the resolution was adopted

The tricolour Charkha flag which was hoisted by Nehru at the banks of Ravi river in Lahore on 31 December 1929

The Declaration of Purna Swaraj or Declaration of the Independence of India was a resolution which was passed by the Indian National Congress in 1930 because of the dissatisfaction among the Indian masses regarding the British offer of Dominion status to India. The word Purna Swaraj was derived from Sanskrit पूर्ण (Pūrṇa) 'Complete' and स्वराज (Svarāja) 'Self-rule or Sovereignty'. It was promulgated by the Indian National Congress, resolving the Congress and Indian nationalists to fight for Purna Swaraj, or complete self-rule/total independence from the British rule.

The tricolour Indian flag was hoisted by Jawaharlal Nehru on 31 December 1929 on the banks of Ravi River, in Lahore. The Congress asked the people of India to observe 26 January as Independence Day (see Legacy). The flag of India was hoisted publicly across India by Congress volunteers and the general public who aspired for self-governance and wanted to achieve independence. Two decades later, the 26th day of January became the nation's Republic Day.

== Background ==
Dadabhai Naoroji in his presidential address at the 1886 National Congress in Calcutta advocated for Swaraj as the sole aim of the nationalist movement, but along the lines of Canada and Australia, which was colonial self-government under the British crown. In 1907, Sri Aurobindo, as editor of the newspaper Bande Mataram, began writing that the new generation of nationalists would not accept anything less than Purna Swaraj, full independence, as it exists in the United Kingdom. Through his writings and speeches, along with Bal Gangadhar Tilak he popularised this idea, making it a core part of the nationalist discourse.

Before 1930, Indian political parties had openly embraced the goal of political independence from the United Kingdom. The All India Home Rule League had been advocating Home Rule for India: dominion status within the British Empire, as granted to Australia, Canada, the Irish Free State, Newfoundland, New Zealand, and South Africa. The All India Muslim League favoured dominion status as well, and opposed calls for outright Indian independence. The Indian Liberal Party, by far the most pro-British party, explicitly opposed India's independence and even dominion status if it weakened India's links with the British Empire. The Indian National Congress, the largest Indian political party of the time, was at the head of the national debate. Congress leader and famous poet Hasrat Mohani was the first activist to demand complete independence (Poorna Swaraj) from the British in 1930 from an All-India Congress Forum. Maghfoor Ahmad Ajazi supported the 'Poorna Swaraj' motion demanded by Hasrat Mohani. Veteran Congress leaders such as Bal Gangadhar Tilak, Sri Aurobindo and Bipin Chandra Pal had also advocated explicit Indian independence from the Empire.It is said that the first independence day was celebrated on 1930, by Sitaram Seksaria in his book.

Following the 1919 Amritsar Massacre, there was considerable public outrage against British rule. Europeans, (civilians and officials) were targets and victims of violence across India. In 1920, Gandhi and the Congress committed themselves to Swaraj, described as political and spiritual independence. At the time, Gandhi described this as the basic demand of all Indians; he specifically said that the question of whether India would remain within the Empire or leave it completely would be answered by the behaviour and response of the British. Between 1920 and 1922, Mahatma Gandhi led the Non-Cooperation movement: nationwide civil disobedience to oppose the Rowlatt Acts and the exclusion of Indians from the government, and the denial of political and civil freedoms.

== Simon commission and the Nehru report ==
In 1927, the British government further outraged people across India by appointing a seven-man, all-European committee led by Sir John Simon, called the Simon Commission to deliberate on constitutional and political reforms for India. Indian political parties were neither consulted nor asked to involve themselves in the process. Upon arrival in India, Chairman Sir John Simon and other commission members were met with angry public demonstrations, which followed them everywhere. The death of a prominent Indian leader, Lala Lajpat Rai, from severe beatings by British police officials further outraged the Indian public.

The Congress appointed an all-Indian commission to propose constitutional reforms for India. Members of other Indian political parties joined the commission led by Congress President Motilal Nehru. The Nehru Report demanded that India be granted self-government under the dominion status within the Empire. While most other Indian political parties supported the Nehru commission's work, it was opposed by the Indian Liberal Party and the All India Muslim League. The British ignored the commission, its report and refused to introduce political reform.

== Dominion or republic? ==
The Nehru Report was also controversial within Congress. Younger nationalist leaders like Subhas Chandra Bose and Jawaharlal Nehru demanded that Congress resolve to make a complete and explicit break from all ties with the British. Jawaharlal Nehru also persuaded Congress to vote for total independence for the country with no links with Great Britain. Now Bose and Nehru opposed dominion status, which would retain the King of Great Britain as the constitutional head of state of India (although in the separate capacity as Emperor of India), and preserve political powers for the British Parliament in Indian constitutional affairs. They were supported in their stand by a large number of rank-and-file Congressmen.

In December 1929, Congress session was held in Lahore and Mahatma Gandhi proposed a resolution that called for the British to grant dominion status to India within two years. After some time Gandhi brokered a further compromise by reducing the time given from two years to one. Jawaharlal Nehru voted for the new resolution, while Subhash Bose told his supporters that he would not oppose the resolution, and abstained from voting himself. The All India Congress Committee voted 118 to 45 in its favour (the 45 votes came from supporters of a complete break from the British). However, when Bose introduced an amendment during the open session of Congress that sought a complete break with the British, Gandhi admonished the move:

You may take the name of independence on your lips but all your muttering will be an empty formula if there is no honour behind it. If you are not prepared to stand by your words, where will independence be?

The amendment was rejected, by 1350 to 973, and the resolution was fully adopted.

On 31 October 1929, the Viceroy of India, Lord Irwin announced that the government would meet with Indian representatives in London for a Round Table Conference. To facilitate Indian participation, Irwin met with Mahatma Gandhi, Muhammad Ali Jinnah and out-going Congress President Motilal Nehru to discuss the meeting. Gandhi asked Irwin if the conference would proceed on the basis of dominion status and Irwin said he could not assure that, resulting in the end of the meeting. There was no set deadline for granting the status, but it was tentatively believed that the process would take more or less than 200 months (around 16 years).

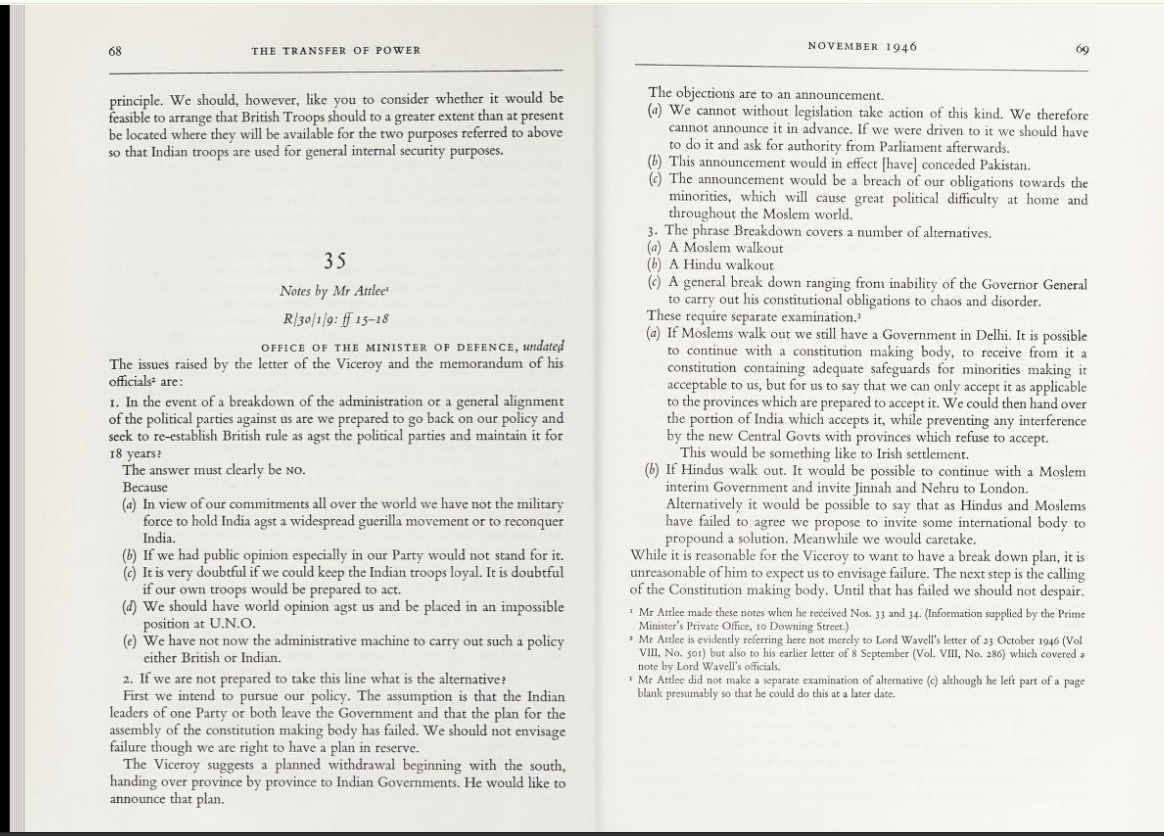
The notes written by the then British prime minister Clement Attlee in late 1946 clearly described the adverse condition of prolonging British rule and immediately emphasized the need for granting India complete independence

By late 1946, the colonial government in India under Wavell and authorities in London immediately began reconsidering India's dominion status and later arranged for a full transfer of power. Thus, an Interim Government of India was constituted to undertake the transition.

== The declaration ==
As a result of the denial of reforms and political rights, and the persistent ignorance of Indian political parties, the Indian National Congress grew increasingly cohesive – unified in the desire to out the British from India completely. A very large number of Congress volunteers and delegates, members of other political parties and an especially large public gathering attended the session convened in Lahore. Despite the bitterly cold weather, Pattabhi Sitaramayya records that:

The heat of passion and excitement, the resentment at the failure of negotiation, the flushing of faces on hearing the war drums – oh, it was all in marked contrast to the weather.

Jawaharlal Nehru was elected president and veteran leaders like Chakravarthi Rajagopalachari and Sardar Vallabhbhai Patel returned to the Congress Working Committee. They approved a declaration of independence, which stated:

The British government in India has not only deprived the Indian people of their freedom but has based itself on the exploitation of the masses, and has ruined India economically, politically, culturally and spiritually.... Therefore...India must sever the British connection and attain Purna Swaraj or complete independence.

At midnight on New Year's Eve, President Jawaharlal Nehru hoisted the tricolour flag of India upon the banks of the Ravi in Lahore, which later became part of Pakistan. A pledge of independence was read out, which included a readiness to withhold taxes. The massive gathering of public attending the ceremony were asked if they agreed with it, and the vast majority of people were witnessed to raise their hands in approval. One hundred seventy-two Indian members of central and provincial legislatures resigned in support of the resolution and in accordance with Indian public sentiment.

The Declaration of Independence was officially promulgated on 26 January 1930. Gandhi and other Indian leaders would immediately begin the planning of a massive national non-violence would encourage the common people not to attack Britishers even if they attacked them. Subsequently, the Salt Satyagraha was initiated by Mahatma Gandhi on 12 March 1930 and what followed gave impetus to the Indian independence movement.

A new Swaraj flag was later adopted by the Congress party in early 1931

The resolution was a short 750-word document; it does not have a legal/constitutional structure – instead, it reads more like a manifesto. The document called for severing ties with the British and claimed 'Purna Swaraj' or completes independence. It indicted British rule and succinctly articulated the resulting economic, political and cultural injustice inflicted on Indians. The document spoke on behalf of Indians and made its intention of launching the civil disobedience movement clear.

== Authorship ==
The text of the declaration of Independence is credited to either Gandhi or Nehru.

== Legacy ==
The Congress regularly observed 26 January as the Independence Day of India – commemorating those who campaigned for Indian independence. In 1947, the British agreed to transfer power and political finesse to India, and 15 August became the official Independence Day. However, the new Constitution of India, as drafted and approved by the Constituent Assembly, was mandated to take effect on 26 January 1950, to commemorate the 1930 declaration. On that day in 1950, India became a republic. 26 January is now celebrated as Republic Day of India every year.
