= Aditi Phadnis =

Political writer

- Other name: Aditi Phadnis Mehta
- Occupations: Writer, Editor

Aditi Phadnis is an Indian political writer and journalist. She writes columns in newspapers and magazines and has published books on the subject of Indian politics. She is married to the defense commentator Ashok Mehta. Her mother, Urmila Phadnis, was International Affairs Professor at JNU.

== Career ==
Phadnis graduated from the Miranda House from the University of Delhi. She was the president of Students' Union for the year 1982–83. She started her career in journalism from 1983 after graduating.

Phadnis worked with various newspaper and magazine publishers like The Independent, The Indian Post and Newstime. Later she worked for the news magazine Sunday. As of 2013, since 2000, she has been working with Business Standard. She was a Jefferson Fellow at the East–West Center in the year 2006. She is the winner of the Ramnath Goenka Excellence in Journalism Award for the year 2008–2009 in the Political Reporting (Print) category. She shared this award with Pranab Dhal Samanta of The Indian Express.

=== Works ===
- Political Profiles of Cabals and Kings, Business Standard Books, 2009. ISBN 8190573543
