= Ashok K. Mehta =

Indian army officer

- Military career
- Allegiance: India
- Branch: Indian Army
- Service years: 1957–1991
- Rank: Major general
- Unit: 5 Gorkha Rifles
- Conflicts: Portuguese-Indian War; Indo-Pakistani War of 1965; Indo-Pakistani War of 1971; Siachen conflict Sri Lankan Civil War

Ashok K. Mehta is a former major general of the Indian Army, as well as a radio and television commentator and a columnist on defence and security issues. He was a founding member of the Defence Planning Staff in the Indian Ministry of Defence. He is also the elder brother of the renowned journalist and editor, Vinod Mehta. Ashok Mehta is married to journalist Aditi Phadnis.

Maj. Gen. Mehta is an alumnus of the Rashtriya Indian Military College (RIMC), Dehradun, an Indian military preparatory school formerly known as the Prince of Wales Royal Indian Military College.

== Military career ==
Mehta joined the Indian Army in 1957 and was commissioned in the 5th Gorkha Rifles infantry regiment the same year. Since then, he fought in almost all of the major wars India went into, with the exception of the Sino-Indian War of 1962, during which time he was on a peacekeeping mission in Zaire.

He undertook special military courses at the Royal College of Defence Studies in the United Kingdom in 1974 and at the Command and General Staff College in the United States in 1975. He taught at the Indian Military Academy in Dehradun and at the Defence Services Staff College in Wellington, Tamil Nadu. Mehta's last assignment in the Indian Army was as Maj. Gen. Harkirat Singh's successor to the position of General Officer Commanding in the Indian Peace Keeping Force in Sri Lanka from 1988 to 1990. He took a premature retirement in 1991.

== Post-retirement ==
Following his retirement, he began serving as a regular radio and television commentator. He also began acting as a policy analyst and columnist on South Asian security affairs. He is an advisor to the Gurkha Memorial Trust and a member of the India-Nepal Track 2 Dialogue. He has also been a consulting editor in the Indian Defence Review, a member of the Institute for Defence Studies and Analyses, and the director of Security and Political Risk Analysis.

== Publications ==
Mehta is the author of several books:

- War Despatches: Operation Iraqi Freedom
- The Maoist Insurgency in Nepal and the Royal Nepal Army
- Operation Parakram: The Military Standoff of 2002

== See also ==
- Indian Peace Keeping Force
