= Urmila Phadnis =

Indian political scientist

Urmila Phadnis (1931 – 1991) was an Indian political scientist and sociologist, who specialised in the ethnology of South Asia. She served as professor of international affairs at Jawaharlal Nehru University. She authored the books Ethnicity and Nation-building in South Asia (2001), Towards the Integration of Indian States, 1919-1947 (1968), and Maldives, Winds of Change in an Atoll State (1985) among others on the geopolitics of South Asia. She was the mother of political writer Aditi Phadnis.
