= Andhra movement =

Campaign to recognize Telugu-speaking parts of Madras Presidency

The Andhra movement or Andhrodyamamu was a campaign for recognition of Telugu-speaking part of the Madras Presidency as a separate political unit in British India. The Andhra movement leaders alleged that the Telugu people were being suppressed by the Tamils, who dominated politics and government jobs. A similar movement was started by the Telangana people living in the Hyderabad State under Nizam's rule. Led by Andhra Mahasabha.

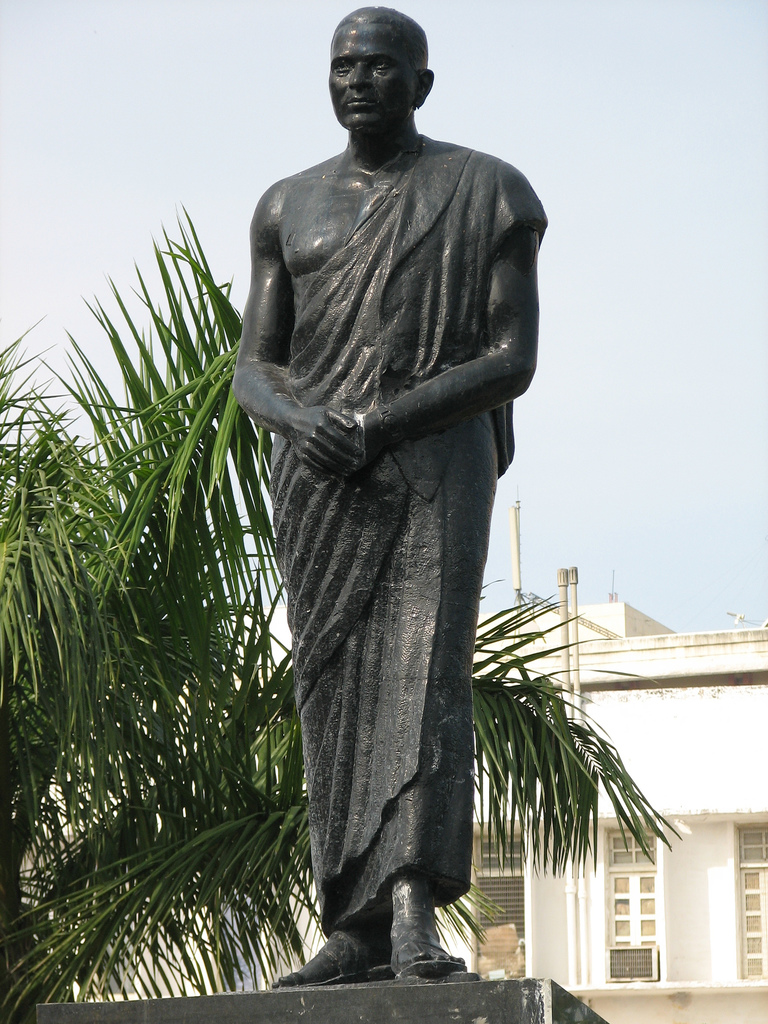
Potti Sreeramulu statue

Indian freedom fighter and revolutionary. Sreeramulu is revered as Amarajeevi ("Immortal Being") in the Andhra region for his self-sacrifice for the Andhra cause. He became famous for undertaking a hunger strike for 56 days in support of having separate state for Andhra Pradesh; he died in the process. His death sparked public rioting and Indian Prime Minister Jawaharlal Nehru declared the intent by the newly liberated nation to form Andhra State three days following the death of Sreeramulu. He contributed his life for the formation of a separate Telugu-speaking state from the dominant Tamil-speaking Madras presidency. His struggles led to the formation of separate Telugu-speaking state.

== Background ==
Andhradyam was a movement that demanded the establishment of a Telugu state on the basis of language, saying that injustices were being done to the Telugu people politically, jobs and culturally in the joint Madras state. 20. This movement started in 1911 and by 1953, it resulted in the formation of Andhra State and then United Andhra Pradesh. Many locals who applied for the job of a Tamil Judge Daphedaru in Gunturu brought in a Sati Tamil from Kumbakonam who was not qualified. Although many Telugu leaders were aware of the linguistic discrimination against the Telugus and thus the oppression they were experiencing in the employment sector, the Andhra movement started as a result of this incident. In 1912, the Andhra Mahasabha began and demanded that Andhra be separated from Madras and made into a separate state.

== Early stages ==
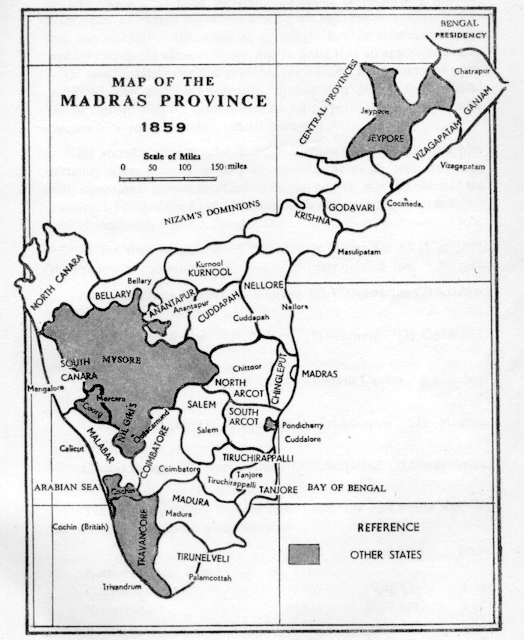
Madras Province

In 1913, the first Andhra Mahasabha was organized in Bapatla. Sir Bayya Narasimheswara Sarma was the first president. In 1918, B N Sarma put a resolution in the Imperial legislative council, seeking linguistic provinces. In the first phase, discussions were held regarding the goals of the Andhra Movement. They came together and announced that their goal was to establish a separate province for the Andhra State by the end of the 1910s.
When the Indian National Congress first formed the Pradesh Congresses, it took a decision in favor of forming provinces on the basis of language and formed their Pradesh Congress Committees accordingly. In accordance with this principled decision, the Andhra Pradesh Congress Committee was formed in 1923 itself.

== Success ==
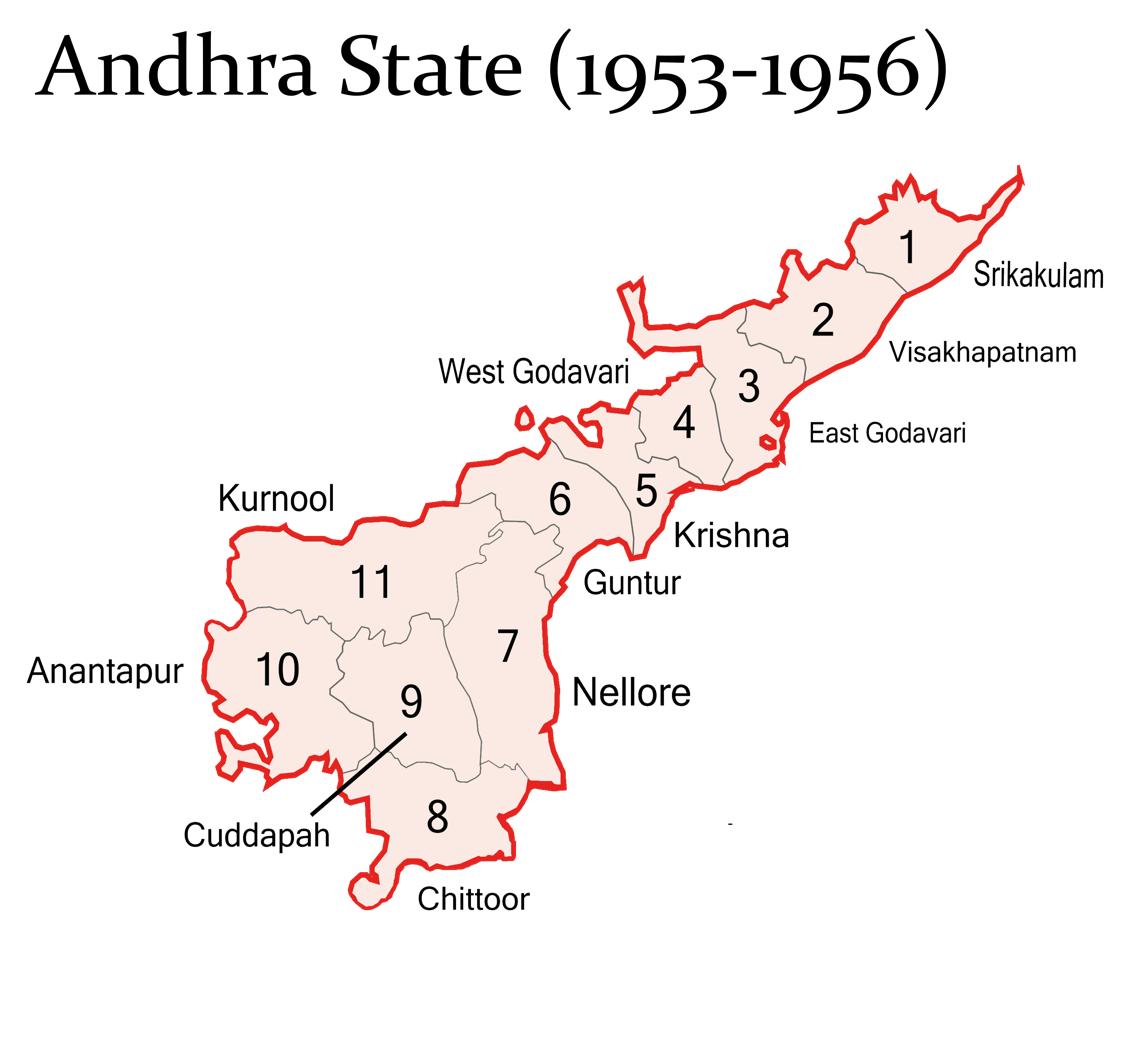
Andhra State Political Map from 1953 to 1956

During Sreeramulu's death procession, people shouted slogans praising his sacrifice. Later, they went into a frenzy and began to destroy public property. The news spread quickly and created an uproar among the people in far off places like Chirala, Srikakulam, Visakhapatnam, Vijayawada, Rajahmundry, Eluru, Bhimavaram, Ballary, Guntur, Tenali, Ongole and Nellore. Seven people were killed in clashes with police in Anakapalle and Vijayawada. The popular agitation continued for three to four days disrupting normal life in the Madras and Andhra regions. On 19 December 1952, the Prime Minister of the country Jawaharlal Nehru made an announcement about the formation of a separate state for the Telugu-speaking people of Madras State. The central government appointed K. N. Wanchoo, Chief Justice of the Rajasthan High Court, to look into issues related to formation of Andhra State. Parliament passed the Andhra State Act in September 1953.

On 1 October 1953, 11 districts in the Telugu-speaking portion of Madras State became the new Andhra State with Kurnool as the capital. Tanguturi Prakasam Pantulu (also known as Andhra Kesari – "The Lion of Andhra") became the first Chief Minister of the new state.

Formation of this first "linguistic state" paved the way to creation of more and provided an opportunity for these states to develop independently, linguistically and economically, each of them having a state to support.

== See also ==
- Visalandhra movement
- Samaikyandhra Movement
- Telangana Movement
- Jai Andhra Movement
