= Vaidiki Velanadu =

Subcaste of Smarta Brahmin

Vaidiki Velanadu is a sub-caste of Telugu speaking Smarta Brahmins whose ancestral roots lie in the Velanadu region, the ancient name for the coastal region on the banks of River Krishna in the Guntur district and Prakasam district. Some may have roots in Northern Andhra Pradesh near Visakhapatnam or Srikakulam or in Southern Telangana near Nalgonda. They are classified as Pancha-Dravida Brahmins. They are predominantly followers of Adi Shankaracharya and are located in Andhra Pradesh and Telangana. However, There is a small subset of them who remain Shrauta Brahmins. Most Vaidiki Velanadu Brahmins follow the Apastamba Dharmasutra and belong to the Taittiriya Shakha of the Krishna Yajur Veda.

The earliest reference to Vaidiki Velanadu starts from 12th century. Early references mention that the Velanadu Brahmins have a martial tradition, and many have fought bravely in the Battle of Palnadu on the side of Brahma Naidu.

Most of the Telugu-speaking priests of Smarta tradition and all of the Telugu Shrauta Brahmins are from this sect. However, the people have diversified into other professions like military service, sports, politics, arts, medicine, advocacy, science, engineering and academics.
