= The Transfer of Power, 1942–47 =

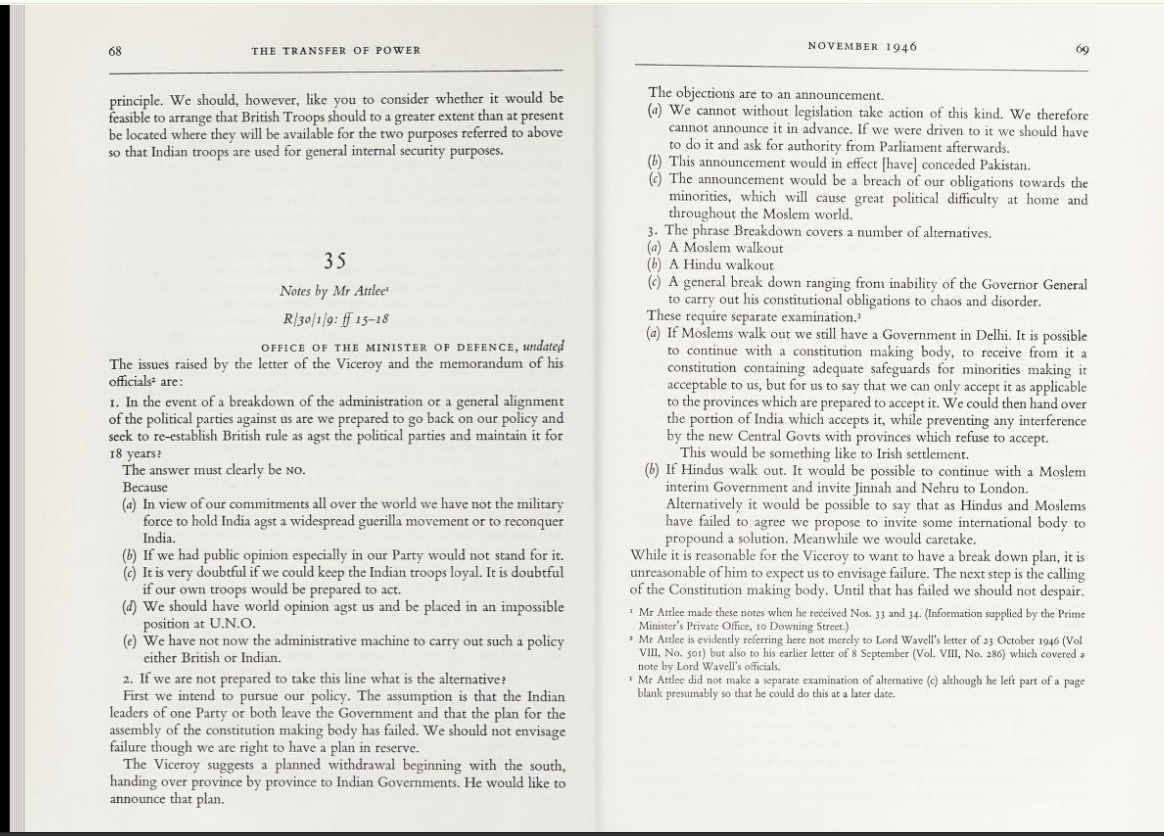
- Author: Clement Attlee (in his capacity as Deputy Prime Minister in the Churchill war ministry)
- Language: English
- Series: Constitutional Relations between Britain and India
- Subject: British–Indian constitutional relations, colonial administration, Indian independence movement
- Genre: Historical documents, political history, colonial studies
- Set in: British India (1942–1947)
- Published: 1970–1982
- Publisher: Stationery Office, London
- Publication date: 1970–1982
- Publication place: United Kingdom
- Media type: Print (hardcover)
- Pages: 12 volumes (each c. 1,000+ pages)
- OCLC: 59085856
- Dewey Decimal: 954.03
- LC Class: DS480.45 .G74
- Website: https://archive.org/details/transferofpower10006unse
- Edited by P. N. S. Mansergh, assisted by E. W. R. Lumby; official publication documenting British–Indian constitutional developments, 1942–1947.

The Transfer of Power, 1942–47 is an extensive documentary compilation based on the constitutional relations between British and India, colonial policies, and administrative decisions preceding independence. Divided into twelve volumes, this publication compiles significant official documents, personal correspondence, administrative reports, and diplomatic records covering the period from January 1942 to 15 August 1947. It is regarded as a fundamental source not only for understanding the political history of India but also that of the entire South Asian region, including Bangladesh and Pakistan.

== Compilation and Publication ==
The project aimed to document the policies, decisions, and political processes of the British administration in India prior to independence, so that future researchers, historians, and policymakers could access the complete body of contemporary records directly.

The series explores the crisis of British rule during the Second World War, the intensification of the Indian independence movement, and the administrative reorganization of the subcontinent. It reflects the decline of imperial power, the rise of nationalist politics, and the historical transformation from colony to sovereign state.

The compilation began in June 1967 following an announcement by Harold Wilson in the House of Commons. Between 1970 and 1982, twelve volumes were gradually published by the London Stationery Office. The entire project was edited by Professor P. N. S. Mansergh of the University of Cambridge, a scholar of British Commonwealth history, with E. W. R. Lumby as assistant editor.

== Historical Significance ==
The Transfer of Power, 1942–47 reflects a transformative period in South Asian political history. The documents in the series present evidence-based analysis of British colonial policy, the diplomatic context of the Indian independence movement, and the transition from imperial rule to self-determination. It is recognized as a fundamental source for studying the colonial history of South Asia, the independence processes of India, Bangladesh, and Pakistan, and the policies of British administration. The series’ detailed annotations, chronological tables, and indexes of individuals enhance its scholarly value.

=== Volume on the Bengal Famine ===
The fourth volume focuses particularly on the Bengal Famine of 1943–44. Unlike other volumes emphasizing political documents, this one includes records concerning food shortages, administrative failures, and the humanitarian catastrophe of the famine. The documents reveal that although the Governor and the Viceroy repeatedly warned about the food crisis, the British wartime cabinet failed to take the issue seriously. Additional famine-related materials remain preserved in the National Archives of India, serving as a valuable source for research.

=== Content and Structure ===
Although arranged chronologically, each volume of the series focuses on a specific political or administrative phase. The titles and publication years of the volumes are as follows:

- The Cripps Mission, January–April 1942 (published 1970)
- Quit India Movement, 30 April–21 September 1942 (published 1971)
- Restoration of Authority and Gandhi’s Fast, 21 September 1942 – 12 June 1943 (published 1971)
- The Bengal Famine and the Viceroyalty, 15 June 1943 – 31 August 1944 (published 1973)
- The Simla Conference: Background and Proceedings, 1 September 1944 – 28 July 1945 (published 1975)
- The Postwar Phase and the Labour Government’s Moves, 1 August 1945 – 22 March 1946 (published 1976)
- The Cabinet Mission, 23 March–20 June 1946 (published 1977)
- The Interim Government, 3 July–1 November 1946 (published 1979)
- The Fixing of a Time Limit, 4 November 1946 – 22 March 1947 (published 1980)
- Mountbatten’s Viceroyalty: Formulation of Plans, 22 March–30 May 1947 (published 1981)
- Mountbatten’s Viceroyalty: The 3 June Plan – Announcement and Acceptance, 31 May–7 July 1947 (published 1982)
- Supplementary Documents and Addenda, containing explanatory notes, annexures, and additional official papers.

The final volume includes explanatory footnotes, an appendix, and three supplementary documents that serve as a comprehensive complement to the entire series.

== Sources and Authenticity ==
The documents compiled in the series were primarily drawn from the India Office Records and the personal collections of the Viceroys preserved in the India Office Library. Major sources included:

- Correspondence between Governors and Viceroys
- Regular exchanges between the Viceroy and the Secretary of State for India
- Minutes of Cabinet Committee meetings during the Second World War
- Official reports, memoranda, and communications from the Prime Minister's Office

The collection also contains evidence of communications between India, the United States, and the British Dominions regarding Indian policy.

== See also ==
- India in World War II
- Partition of India
- Bengal famine of 1943
