= Janasena Party =

Jana Sena Party
- Jana Sena Party జనసేన పార్టీ
- Abbreviation: JSP
- President: Pawan Kalyan
- Chairman: Nadendla Manohar
- Secretary: Naga Babu
- Rajya Sabha Leader: Lingamaneni Ramesh
- Lok Sabha Leader: Vallabhaneni Balashowry
- Founder: Pawan Kalyan
- Founded: 14 March 2014 (12 years ago)
- Headquarters: Mangalagiri, Guntur, Andhra Pradesh
- Student wing: Bhagat Singh Student Union
- Youth wing: Azad Yuvasena Vibhagam
- Women's wing: Jhansi Veera Mahila Vibhagam
- Ideology: Telugu nationalism; Social conservatism; Environmentalism; Humanism; Secularism; Centrism
- Political position: Centre
- Colours: White; Red
- ECI status: State Party
- Alliance: NDA (2014–2018, 2020–present)
- Seats in Rajya Sabha: 1 / 245
- Seats in Lok Sabha: 2 / 543
- Seats in Andhra Pradesh Legislative Council: 2 / 58
- Seats in Andhra Pradesh Legislative Assembly: 21 / 175
- Number of states and union territories in government: 1 / 31

Election symbol
- Glass Tumbler

Party flag
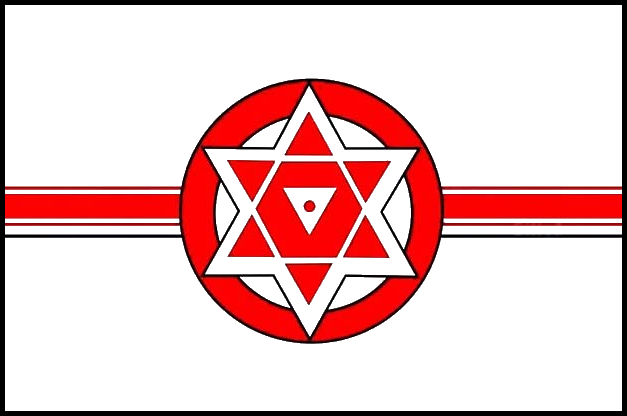

Website
- www.janasenaparty.org

The Jana Sena Party (lit. 'People's Army Party'; abbr. JSP) is an Indian political party active in the states of Andhra Pradesh and Telangana. Founded by Pawan Kalyan on 14 March 2014, it is currently the second largest party in the Andhra Pradesh Legislative Assembly and a partner in the ruling coalition. Pawan Kalyan, the party leader, has been serving as the Deputy Chief Minister of Andhra Pradesh since June 2024. Jana Sena advocates for a centrist approach with a focus on humanism. The party's election symbol is a glass tumbler.

Jana Sena Party did not contest the 2014 elections, but its support was crucial for the victory of the TDP-BJP alliance in Andhra Pradesh. The party gained prominence for highlighting issues such as the chronic kidney disease crisis in Uddanam in 2017, which was described by the WHO as "the least understood and the least publicized nephropathy." It later led protests against forced land acquisition, illegal mining in reserved forests, and drought-related issues in 2018.

In 2019, JSP contested its first elections, winning one MLA seat and securing approximately 6% of the vote share. Subsequently, it focused on grassroots issues, including farmer welfare, illegal sand mining, women's safety, and land encroachment. In early 2024, Pawan Kalyan played a key role in the formation of an alliance between the JSP, TDP and BJP, known as Kūṭami (lit. 'Alliance'). The alliance achieved a landslide victory in both the general and state legislative assembly elections, with the JSP winning all 21 MLA seats and two MP seats it contested, becoming a significant part of the ruling coalition in Andhra Pradesh.

== Ideology ==
The main goal of Jana Sena Party is to question any type of corruption in government functioning and organizations and to protect the basic rights of people. Jana Sena follows seven basic ideals promoted as 'Ideals of Jana Sena' ('Jana Sena Sidhanthalu' in Telugu):

- Mindset that unites different castes
- Politics without religious discrimination
- Tradition that reveres linguistic diversity
- Society that protects our traditions and culture
- Nationalism that does not neglect regional aspirations
- Relentless fight against corruption
- Development that preserves the environment

The party founder and president, Pawan Kalyan, has often stated that he believes in a centrist path, and in maintaining a balance or a middle ground between right and left ideologies. He added, "Many people say we don’t understand your -ism. I say to them that my -ism is humanism." He also mentioned that he follows Sanatana Dharma but also respects other religions.

== History ==
=== Formation ===
On 12 March 2014, it was officially announced that Telugu matinée idol and philanthropist Pawan Kalyan, was launching a new political party. In preparation for the launch, Kalyan reportedly visited Delhi to register the party with the Election Commission of India (ECI).

Kalyan formally launched the party at the Hyderabad International Convention Centre (HICC) in Madhapur, Hyderabad, on 14 March 2014 with a massive meeting. The party was named Jana Sena (transl. People's Army), and Kalyan urged people to challenge those in power. He unveiled the party's flag and objectives at the event attended by 6,000 people. Kalyan criticized the Congress Party high command for the state's issues, accusing them of dividing the state without addressing the people's concerns.

The party held its second public meeting in Visakhapatnam on March 27, 2014, where Kalyan launched the book Ism, co-authored with Raju Raviteja. The Election Commission approved the party on November 28, 2014.

=== 2014 – 2019 ===
==== 2014 elections ====
Pawan Kalyan chose not to contest in the 2014 elections, instead supporting and campaigning extensively for the Telugu Desam Party (TDP) and Bharatiya Janata Party (BJP) alliance. Kalyan campaigned against the Congress party, giving the slogan "Congress Hatao, Desh Bachao" (transl. Remove Congress, Save the Nation). His rallies drew huge crowds in Andhra Pradesh and Telangana. His support and campaigning played a crucial role in the TDP-led National Democratic Alliance's victory in the Andhra Pradesh Assembly elections.

==== Campaign for Special Category Status ====
In September 2016, Pawan Kalyan's public criticism of the BJP and TDP over the delay in granting Special Category Status to Andhra Pradesh led to increased political pressure. Ten days after Kalyan's Tirupati meeting, where he condemned the central government's inaction, the Union Government announced a 'special package' for the state in a midnight press conference. Chief Minister Chandrababu Naidu accepted the package, but Kalyan, at a massive public gathering named Seemandhrula Atma Gaurava Sabha in Kakinada on 9 September 2016, dismissed the concessions as eyewash, resonating with public sentiment and further criticizing Naidu’s compliance with the BJP. One political commentator described the announcement of the special package as a 'political victory' for Pawan Kalyan, highlighting his significant influence.

In November 2016, it was announced that the first office of the Jana Sena Party (JSP) would be established in Anantapur the following year, with plans to contest the 2019 general election.

==== Spotlight on the Uddanam kidney disease crisis ====
Pawan Kalyan brought attention to the Uddanam kidney disease issue in Srikakulam district by requesting Harvard University doctors to participate in clinical research on local kidney problems. He subsequently held a meeting in Visakhapatnam with these Harvard doctors and local scientists. Kalyan also met with Chief Minister Chandrababu Naidu to discuss the Uddanam situation, leading to the establishment of a dialysis centre in the region. In May 2018, he went on a one-day hunger strike for proper care of patients in Uddanam in May 2018.

On 21 February 2017, Kalyan announced that he would launch a website on 14 March to mark the party's anniversary and invite recommendations for the party manifesto in the 2019 general election.

The fourth formation day of JSP was conducted at Acharya Nagarjuna University grounds on March 14, 2018. Kalyan criticized both central and state governments in this meeting. He mainly targeted Arun Jaitley, N. Chandrababu Naidu and Nara Lokesh for their poor governance and alleged corruption. He said, "I supported the TDP and the BJP parties during the general elections held in 2014 with the hope that they would rebuild the state which had no Capital and no financial resources. But the state government has belied my hopes and the aspirations of crores of people. Why should I support these parties which have betrayed the people?" He questioned Chandrababu Naidu about his son's alleged corruption.

In December 2017, Kalyan opposed the central government's move to privatize the Dredging Corporation of India (DCI). In July 2018, he opposed the TDP government's decision on forced land pooling. In October 2018, he organized a march on the historical Dowleswaram Barrage, Rajahmundry, demanding political accountability. In November 2018, he exposed the alleged unchecked mining in the reserved forest area at Vanthada village of Prathipadu, East Godavari district. In December 2018, he led a protest march to condole the families of farmers who committed suicide or migrated from the drought-prone regions of Rayalaseema. The prime objective of Janasena Party has been to ensure equal power to all social groups of people.

=== 2019–2024 ===
==== 2019 elections ====
On 2 May 2018, the JSP announced that it would contest all 175 assembly seats in Andhra Pradesh during the 2019 assembly election. JSP formed a bloc with the Bahujan Samaj Party, Communist Party of India, and Communist Party of India (Marxist). Kalyan contested two seats in the election, Gajuwaka and Bhimavaram. He failed to win either seat. JSP candidate, Rapaka Vara Prasada Rao, was elected from Razole Assembly constituency. The party managed to get around 6% vote share in Andhra Pradesh.

Manifesto

Kalyan released the party's 2019 election manifesto on the fifth formation day of JSP at Rajahmundry. The party declared war on unemployment and corruption and wished to ensure the safety of women. Other goals included:

- Irrigation support fund of ₹8,000 per acre to every farmer's family
- Dokka Seethamma canteens, which provide free food for students
- ₹5,000 pension for small, marginal and tenant farmers above 60 years of age and free solar pump sets for all farmers
- Arts and science college at every mandal level
- ₹10 lakh (one million rupees) free health insurance, and mobile diagnostic centres in all mandals
- ₹10,000 financial support at 25 paisa interest to small businesses
- Implementation of Sachar Committee recommendations
- Free education from LKG to PG
- Free liquefied petroleum gas cylinders for housewives
- Financial support for fishermen during the non-fishing season
- High court bench in Rayalaseema
- Chief minister (CM) to be brought under Lokayukta
- 33% reservations for women in the state legislature and establishment of Mahila banks in all districts
- Ten lakh (one million) jobs every year

After the 2019 setback, Jana Sena focused on highlighting issues like farmer welfare, transparent governance, poor infrastructure, illegal sand mining, women's safety, land encroachment etc. On 3 November 2019, Kalyan led a long march in Visakhapatnam in support of construction workers, against YSR Congress Party, who have been facing unemployment due to a shortage of supply of sand in Andhra Pradesh. On 16 January 2020, Kalyan announced his party's alliance with the BJP, after three years of distancing from it. On 12 February 2020, he led a rally for justice to Sugali Preethi, a 15-year-old girl who was raped and murdered, in Kurnool. He demanded an inquiry by Central Bureau of Investigation (CBI) into the incident. In late 2022, Kalyan started 'Jana Vani,' a series of small public meetings to hear people's grievances.

==== 2023 Varahi Yatra ====
In 2023, Kalyan undertook a tour in the state on a customized vehicle named Varahi, aimed at highlighting the failures of Jagan Mohan Reddy's administration. The vehicle used for the trip is a camper van having facilities like a bed, cooking appliances, a bathroom, and a compact meeting area. The tour also included the 'Jana Vani' programme, where the party received petitions from people seeking redressal of their grievances. Later, the grievances were to the notice of the concerned authorities to get them addressed.

The first phase of the yatra started with darshan at Satyanarayana Swamy temple in Annavaram on 14 June and was drawn to a close at Bhimavaram on 30 June. Kalyan toured Prathipadu, Pithapuram, Kakinada urban, Kakinada rural, Mummidivaram, Amalapuram, P. Gannavaram, Narasapuram, Razole, Palakollu, and Bhimavaram constituencies in the first phase. The second phase of the Varahi Yatra began with a public meeting in Eluru town on 9 July.

=== 2024–present ===
==== 2024 elections ====
On 14 September 2023, Kalyan announced via a press conference, that the JSP and TDP would jointly fight the 2024 Andhra Pradesh legislative elections. In March 2024, TDP rejoined the NDA for legislative elections and 2024 General Elections, effectively making it a tri-party alliance, or Kutami, in Andhra Pradesh. Kalyan played a key role in forging the alliance between JSP, TDP and BJP by limiting the number of seats his party contested. The alliance swept to power in a landslide victory, with Janasena winning each of the seats it contested — 21 MLA seats and 2 MP seats. Kalyan was elected to the Andhra Pradesh Legislative Assembly from Pitapuram constituency by a margin of over 70,000 votes.

After the 2024 elections, the Jana Sena Party (JSP) attained eligibility for recognized party status. According to the Election Commission's guidelines, a party can achieve state party status by securing at least three per cent of the total number of seats. JSP exceeded this threshold by winning 13% of the seats in the state, qualifying for the status.

==== Jana Sena in coalition government ====
On 12 June 2024, party president Pawan Kalyan was sworn in as a cabinet minister in the Government of Andhra Pradesh, and on 16 June 2024, he was announced as the Deputy Chief Minister. He is also the Minister of Panchayat Raj, Rural Development & Rural Water Supply; Environment, Forests, Science & Technology.

On the same day, two other Jana Sena legislators and Pawan Kalyan were sworn in as ministers. Nadendla Manohar became the Minister for Food and Civil Supplies, Consumer Affairs, while Kandula Durgesh became the Minister for Tourism, Culture, and Cinematography.

On 5 July 2024, P. Hari Prasad was elected unopposed as a member of the Andhra Pradesh Legislative Council under the MLA quota, becoming the first MLC from the Jana Sena Party. On 24 July 2024, Jana Sena made key appointments for the party within the Andhra Pradesh Assembly. Tenali MLA, Nadendla Manohar, was designated as the Deputy Floor Leader of the party, while Lokam Naga Madhavi, the MLA of Nellimarla, was appointed as the Chief Whip. Bhimavaram MLA, Pulaparthi Ramanjaneyulu has been appointed as the Treasurer. Visakhapatnam South MLA Vamsi Krishna Yadav, and Razole MLA Deva Varaprasad have been appointed as Secretaries.

In October 2024, amidst the Tirupati Laddu controversy, Pawan Kalyan issued a clarion call through his Varahi declaration in Tirupati, advocating for the formation of a board dedicated to protecting temples and Hindu interests.

==== Membership Milestone ====
In early August 2024, the Jana Sena Party (JSP) reached a major milestone by exceeding one million members. The party, which had set a goal to enrol one million new members within the year, achieved this target as reported in August 2024, compared to 6.47 lakh done in 2023 and 3.50 lakh and 1 lakh in 2022 and 2021 respectively. The growth was highlighted by party leaders, including Nadendla Manohar, who underscored the significance of this expansion for the party’s future political initiatives.

== Leadership ==
=== Political Affairs Committee ===
Portrait	Name (Year of Birth)	Tenure			Designation	Ref.
Portrait	Name (Year of Birth)	Assumed office	Left office	Time in office	Designation	Ref.
	Pawan Kalyan (born 1971)	14 September 2014	Incumbent	12 years, 27 days	President	
	Nadendla Manohar (born 1964)	12 October 2018	Incumbent	7 years, 364 days	Chairman	

=== Others ===
Position	Name
Vice-President	Bongunoori Mahender Reddy
Telangana Incharge	Nemuri Shankar Goud
Political Advisor	P. Ramamohan Rao (ex-TN Chief Secretary)
Political Secretary to President	P. Hari Prasad
Official Representatives	Bolisetti Satya; Kandula Durgesh; T. Siva Sankar Rao
Party Affairs Committee Chairman	Sekhar Puli
IT Centre	Ram Talluri
Official Spokesperson	Prof. Dr. K. Sarat Kumar
Other Leaders	Naga Babu; Sandeep Panchakarla; Siva Rama Krishna Vaka; Muttamsetti Krishna Rao; Palavalsa Yesaswini; Jivaji Rekha; Arham Khan; Pasupuleti Hari Prasad; Sujatha Panda; Pantham Nanaji; State official Spokesperson Siva Parvathi

== Electoral performance ==
=== Indian general elections ===
Lok Sabha Elections
Year	Lok Sabha	Party leader	Seats contested	Seats won	Change in seats	Percentage of votes	Vote swing	Popular vote	Outcome
2019	17th	Konidala Pawan Kalyan	24	0 / 543	Steady	0.32%	Steady	1,915,127	Lost
2024	18th	Konidala Pawan Kalyan	2	2 / 543	▲2	0.23%	▼0.09%	1,454,138	Government

=== State legislative assembly elections ===
Andhra Pradesh Legislative Assembly Elections
Year	Assembly	Party leader	Seats contested	Seats won	Change in seats	Percentage of votes	Vote swing	Popular vote	Outcome
2019	15th	Konidala Pawan Kalyan	137	1 / 175	▲1	5.53%	Steady	1,736,811	Others
2024	16th	Konidala Pawan Kalyan	21	21 / 175	▲20	6.85%	▲1.32%	2,317,747	Government

Telangana Legislative Assembly Elections
Year	Assembly	Party leader	Seats contested	Seats won	Change in seats	Percentage of votes	Vote swing	Popular vote	Outcome
2023	3rd	Konidala Pawan Kalyan	8	0 / 119	Steady	0.25%	Steady	59,001	Lost

== List of party leaders ==
=== Presidents ===
No.	Portrait	Name (Lifespan)	Term in office		
No.	Portrait	Name (Lifespan)	Assumed office	Left office	Time in office
1		Konidala Pawan Kalyan (born 1971)	14 March 2014	Incumbent	12 years, 211 days

== Legislative leaders ==
=== List of deputy chief ministers ===
==== Deputy Chief Minister of Andhra Pradesh ====
No.	Portrait	Name (Lifespan)	Term in office			Assembly (Election)	Elected constituency	Chief Minister
No.	Portrait	Name (Lifespan)	Assumed office	Left office	Time in office	Assembly (Election)	Elected constituency	Chief Minister
1		Konidala Pawan Kalyan (born 1971)	12 June 2024	Incumbent	2 years, 121 days	16th (2024)	Pithapuram	N. Chandrababu Naidu

== See also ==
- Politics of India
- Elections in India
- Politics of Andhra Pradesh
- Elections in Andhra Pradesh
- List of political parties in India
