= Varahi Yatra =

Political event

- Part of Jana Sena Party
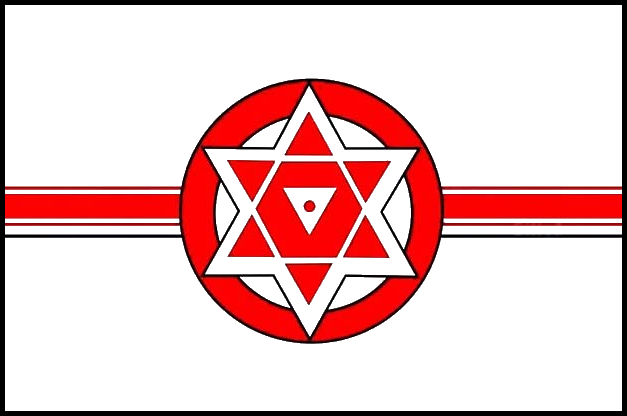
- Date: 14 June 2023
- Location: Andhra Pradesh, India
- Motive: To address the problems of the public all over the state of Andhra Pradesh

Varahi Yatra, is a mass contact moment led by Jana Sena Party chief Pawan Kalyan on 14 June 2023 with the blessings of Annavaram Satyanarayana Swamy, In order to emphasize the shortcomings of the Y S Jagan Mohan Reddy administration, Janasena made a trip around the state in a vehicle called Varahi. The camper van used for the journey has amenities like a bed, kitchenware, a bathroom, etc. The Janavani initiative, where the party accepts petitions from individuals seeking satisfaction for their problems, is also included in the visit. Later, the complaints will be brought to the attention of the relevant authorities in order to get them resolved. The first stage of the yatra began on 14 June with a temple visit and ended on 30 June at Bhimavaram.

== Background ==
Jana Sena Party chief started the first phase of Yatra by visiting Prattipadu, Pithapuram, Kakinada rural, Kakinada urban, and Mummidivaram. Pawan Kalyan interacted and conducted meetings with several groups of people throughout the yatra. He planned exclusive gatherings for DWACRA women, fisherpeople, and handloom weavers. Additionally, he will meet with a number of artists and reassure them that the party will support them.
