= Varahi declaration =

Declaration about protecting Hindu temples

The Varahi declaration (Note: Varahi is the vehicle used by Pawan Kalyan named after the Hindu goddess Varahi.) is a bilingual document set in Telugu and English by the Indian politician Pawan Kalyan at Tirupati on 3 October 2024, for the protection of Hindu interests through the enactment of a strong law by the Indian government. Pawan Kalyan is the leader of Janasena Party, a political party that is part of the ruling coalition government in Andhra Pradesh since June 2024.

== Background ==
Constant attacks on Hindu temples became a serious concern during Jagan Reddy's rule in Andhra Pradesh. In the wake of the Tirupati laddu adulteration controversy which was alleged by the ruling NDA government of Andhra Pradesh in September 2024, Pawan Kalyan, the deputy chief minister of the state lamented for lack of a board in India for the protection of Hindu endowments and temples on par with the Waqf Board for Indian Muslims. He stressed a collective effort and broader debate on issues such as the desecration of Hindu temples. The Laddu controversy became a huge political tangle between the ruling NDA government and the ex-chief minister Jagan Reddy's YSR Congress Party which ruled the previous term (during 2019–2024). The issue went to the notice of Supreme Court of India which took a serious note and ordered a probe by a five-membered team comprising two members nominated by the Central Bureau of Investigation, two members nominated by the Andhra Pradesh government, and an official from Food Safety and Standards Authority of India. On the occasion of the completion of 100 days of rule by the NDA government in Andhra Pradesh, Pawan Kalyan after visiting the Tirumala temple on foot to end his 11-day penance called for a public meeting in Tirupati to announce a declaration.

== Substance ==
The popular Hindu phrase in Sanskrit introduces the Declaration: Dharmo Rakshati Rakshitah (Sanskrit: धर्मो रक्षति रक्षितः, lit. 'Dharma protects those who protect it', dharmo rakṣati rakṣitaḥ), originally mentioned in Mahabharata. The declaration demanded the formation of a Sanatana Dharma Protection Board while stressing the principle of Secularism and also for uniformity in the protection of religious sentiments across all religions without any discrimination.

=== Articles ===
Article I – Secularism must be upheld in a manner that ensures uniform response to any threat or harm caused to any religion or faith.
(Telugu: ē matāniki, ē dharmāniki bhaṃgaṃ vāṭillinā okēlā spaṃdiṃcē laukikavādānni pāṭiṃcāli.)

Article II – A strong national Act is required to protect Sanatana Dharma and prevent actions that harm its beliefs. This Act should be enacted immediately and uniformly enforced across the nation.
(Telugu: sanātana dharma parirakṣaṇa kōsaṃ, ā viśvāsālaku bhaṃgaṃ kalugajēsē caryalu arikaṭṭaḍāniki dēśaṃ mottaṃ amalu ayyēlā oka balamaina caṭṭaṃ avasaraṃ uṃdi. dānni takṣaṇamē tīsukurāvāli.)

Article III – A "Sanatana Dharma Protection Board" should be established at both the national and state levels to oversee the implementation of this Act.
(Telugu: sanātana dharma parirakṣaṇa kōsaṃ tīsukuvaccē caṭṭānni amalu cēsēlā jātīya, rāṣṭra sthāyilō sanātana dharma parirakṣaṇa bōrdu ērpāṭu cēyāli.)

Article IV – Annual funds must be allocated to support this board and its activities.
(Telugu: sanātana dharma parirakṣaṇa bōrduku prati ēṭā nidhulu kēṭāyiṃcāli.)

Article V – There should be non-cooperation to individuals or organizations that defame or spread hatred against Sanatana Dharma.
(Telugu: sanātanadharmānni kiṃcaparaci, dvēṣaṃ ciṃdiṃcē vyaktulaku, vyavasthalaku sahāya nirākaraṇa jaragāli.)

Article VI – Sanathana Dharma Certification must be implemented to ensure the purity of materials used in offerings and prasadam at temples.
(Telugu: ālayālalō nityaṃ jarigē naivēdyālu, prasādālalō viniyōgiṃcē vastuvulu svacchatani dhr̥vīkariṃcē vidhānānni tīsukurāvāli.)

Article VII – Temples should evolve not only as spiritual centers but also as centres for promoting art & culture, education, economy, environmental conservation and welfare with comprehensive planning.
(Telugu: ālayālu adhyātmika kēṃdrālugā mātramē kādu, vidyākēṃdrālugā, ārthika kēṃdrālugā, paryāvaraṇa parirakṣaṇa kēṃdrālugā mariyu saṃkṣēma kēṃdrālugā kūḍā pūrtisthāyilō rūpudiddukōvāli. ā diśagā oka praṇāḷika siddhaṃ cēyāli.)

=== Key proposals of the declaration ===
Pawan Kalyan put forth seven crucial proposals in the Varahi declaration: uniform application of secularism across all religions, national legislation to defend Sanatana Dharma, the establishment of Sanatana Dharma Protection Boards at both national and state levels, allocation of budget for the protection board, disengagement from Hindumisia and/or Hinduphobia, a sanatana dharma certification in Hindu temples, and a broader role of temples.

== See also ==
- Venkateswara Temple, Tirumala
- Tirupati Laddu
- Anti-Hindu sentiment
- Pawan Kalyan

== Sources ==
- Rangarajan, A.D. (3 October 2024). "Varahi Declaration: Pawan administers pledge to save Sanatana Dharma, respect all faiths". The Hindu.
- Sudhir, SNV (3 October 2024). "Tirupati laddu row: I am an 'unapologetic Sanatani Hindu', declares Pawan Kalyan; reiterates 'animal fat in prasadam' claim". Deccan Herald.
- "Temple attacks in Andhra Pradesh a cause for concern". The New Indian Express. 13 January 2021.
- ET Online, ed. (23 September 2024). "Tirupati Laddu Beef Tallow Controversy: Amul says its not involved in supplying ghee to Tirupati". The Economic Times.
- Aluri, Srikanth (21 September 2024). "Andhra Pradesh deputy CM Pawan Kalyan calls for 'Collective fight for the protection of Sanatan Dharma'". Times of India. Cyber Tech Publications.
- AnanthaKrishnan, G. (4 October 2024). "Tirupati laddu row: Supreme Court orders CBI-monitored SIT probe, says 'won't allow court to be used as political battleground'". The Indian Express.
- HT News Desk, ed. (4 October 2024). "Pawan Kalyan reaches Tirupati temple on foot as penance amid Andhra Pradesh laddu row". The Hindustan Times.
- "Shloka Shock: A verse from religious text not always just religious". The Financial Express. 31 January 2019.
- Shaji, U. S. (2008). Studies in Hindu Religion. Cyber Tech Publications. ISBN 978-81-7884-386-5.
- "Andhra Pradesh Dy CM Pawan Kalyan Advocates For Sanatana Dharma With Varahi Declaration". The Commune. 4 October 2024.
