= Ministry of Civil Supplies, Food and Consumer Affairs =

Position in Andhra Pradesh, India

Minister of Consumer Affairs, Food and Civil Supplies
- Viniyōgadārula Vyavahārālu, Āhāraṁ mariyu Paura Sarapharāla Śākha Mantrī
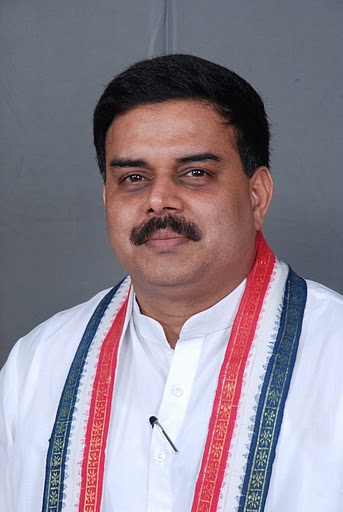
- Incumbent; Nadendla Manohar since 12 June 2024
- Department of Consumer Affairs, Food & Civil Supplies
- Member of: Andha Pradesh Cabinet
- Reports to: Governor of Andhra Pradesh; Chief Minister of Andhra Pradesh; Andhra Pradesh Legislature
- Appointer: Governor of Andhra Pradesh on the advice of the chief minister of Andhra Pradesh
- Inaugural holder: Paritala Sunitha
- Formation: 8 June 2014
- Website: Official website

The Minister of Consumer Affairs, Food and Civil Supplies is the head of the Department of Consumer Affairs, Food & Civil Supplies of the Government of Andhra Pradesh.

The incumbent Minister of Consumer Affairs, Food & Civil Supplies is Nadendla Manohar from the Janasena Party.

== List of ministers ==
#	Portrait	Minister (Lifespan) Constituency	Term of office			Election (Term)	Party	Ministry	Chief Minister	Ref.
#	Portrait	Minister (Lifespan) Constituency	Term start	Term end	Duration	Election (Term)	Party	Ministry	Chief Minister	Ref.
1		Paritala Sunitha (born 1970); MLA for Raptadu	8 June 2014	1 April 2017	2 years, 297 days	2014 (14th)	Telugu Desam Party	Naidu III	N. Chandrababu Naidu	
2		Prathipati Pulla Rao (born 1958); MLA for Chilakaluripet	2 April 2017	29 May 2019	2 years, 57 days	2014 (14th)	Telugu Desam Party	Naidu III	N. Chandrababu Naidu	
3		Kodali Nani (born 1971); MLA for Gudivada	30 May 2019	7 April 2022	2 years, 312 days	2019 (15th)	YSR Congress Party	Jagan	Y. S. Jagan Mohan Reddy	
4		Karumuri Venkata Nageswara Rao (born 1964); MLA for Tanuku	11 April 2022	11 June 2024	2 years, 61 days	2019 (15th)	YSR Congress Party	Jagan	Y. S. Jagan Mohan Reddy	
5		Nadendla Manohar (born 1969); MLA for Tenali	12 June 2024	Incumbent	2 years, 88 days	2024 (16th)	Janasena Party	Naidu IV	N. Chandrababu Naidu	
