= Alapati =

Alapati or Aalapati is a given name and a Telugu surname. Notable people with the name include:

== Given name ==
- Alapati Leiua (born 1988), New Zealand rugby union footballer

== Surname ==
- Alapati Dharma Rao (1930–2003), Indian politician
- Alapati Venkataramaiah (1917–1965), Indian minister and freedom fighter from Andhra Pradesh
