= Nadendla Manohar =

Indian politician

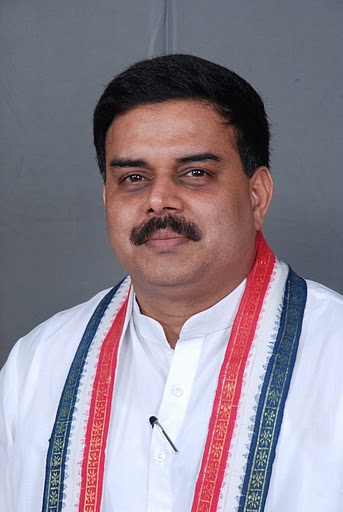
- Nadendla Manohar

Minister of Civil Supplies, Food and Consumer Affairs Government of Andhra Pradesh
- Incumbent
- Assumed office 12 June 2024
- Governor: S. Abdul Nazeer
- Chief Minister: N. Chandrababu Naidu
- Preceded by: Karumuri Venkata Nageswara Rao

Chairperson of the Political Affairs Committee Jana Sena Party
- Incumbent
- Assumed office 12 October 2018
- President: Pawan Kalyan
- Preceded by: Office Established

18th Speaker of the Andhra Pradesh Legislative Assembly
- In office 4 June 2011 – 18 June 2014
- Deputy: Mallu Bhatti Vikramarka
- Preceded by: N. Kiran Kumar Reddy
- Succeeded by: Kodela Siva Prasada Rao (residuary andhra)

18th Deputy Speaker of the Andhra Pradesh Legislative Assembly
- In office 9 June 2009 – 3 June 2011
- Speaker: Nallari Kiran Kumar Reddy
- Preceded by: G. Kuthuhulamma
- Succeeded by: Mallu Bhatti Vikramarka

Member of Legislative Assembly, Andhra Pradesh
- Incumbent
- Assumed office 4 June 2024
- Preceded by: Annabathuni Siva Kumar
- Constituency: Tenali
- In office 11 May 2004 – 16 May 2014
- Preceded by: Gogineni Uma
- Succeeded by: Alapati Rajendra Prasad
- Constituency: Tenali

Personal details
- Born: 6 April 1964 (age 62) Tenali, Andhra Pradesh, India
- Party: Janasena Party (2018 – present)
- Other political affiliations: Indian National Congress (2004 – 2018)
- Spouse: Nadendla Manoharam
- Children: Mitul Nadendla, Lalith Nadendla
- Parent: Nadendla Bhaskara Rao (father)

Nadendla Manohar (born 6 April 1964) is an Indian politician who has been serving as the Minister of Civil Supplies, Food and Consumer Affairs in Andhra Pradesh government. He is a Member of the Legislative Assembly from Tenali Assembly constituency. He previously served as the Speaker of Andhra Pradesh Legislative Assembly. He was the last speaker of the United Andhra Pradesh before the formation of the Telangana state on 2 June 2014. Nadendla Manohar was sworn in as the 18th Speaker of Andhra Pradesh Legislative Assembly on 4 June 2011. He is a two-time Member of the Legislative Assembly in Andhra Pradesh. On 12 October 2018 he joined Jana Sena Party.

== Education ==
Nadendla Manohar is an MBA graduate from College of Commerce and Business Management, Osmania University, with specialization in Marketing and B.A. from Nizam College, Osmania University, Hyderabad.

== Political career ==
Manohar was elected as the Speaker in June 2011. He is an elected Member of the Indian National Congress from Tenali Constituency of Guntur district in Andhra Pradesh during 2004 and 2009 Assembly elections. He contested and trailed in the 2019 Assembly elections.

In 2024, he contested and was elected from Tenali with a landslide margin. Currently, Nadendla Manohar is serving as the Minister of Civil Supplies, Food and Consumer Affairs.

== Interests ==
Manohar was a nationally ranked Tennis player. He has participated in several tournaments in the country and abroad. He was Bronze Medallist in the National Games, 1986.
