= Prathipadu =

Prathipadu or Prattipadu is the name of villages in different districts of Andhra Pradesh, India.

- Prathipadu, East Godavari district
- Prathipadu, Guntur district
- Prathipadu, Kakinada Assembly constituency, East Godavari district
- Prathipadu (SC) Assembly constituency, Guntur district
