= Dokka Seethamma =

Indian social activist

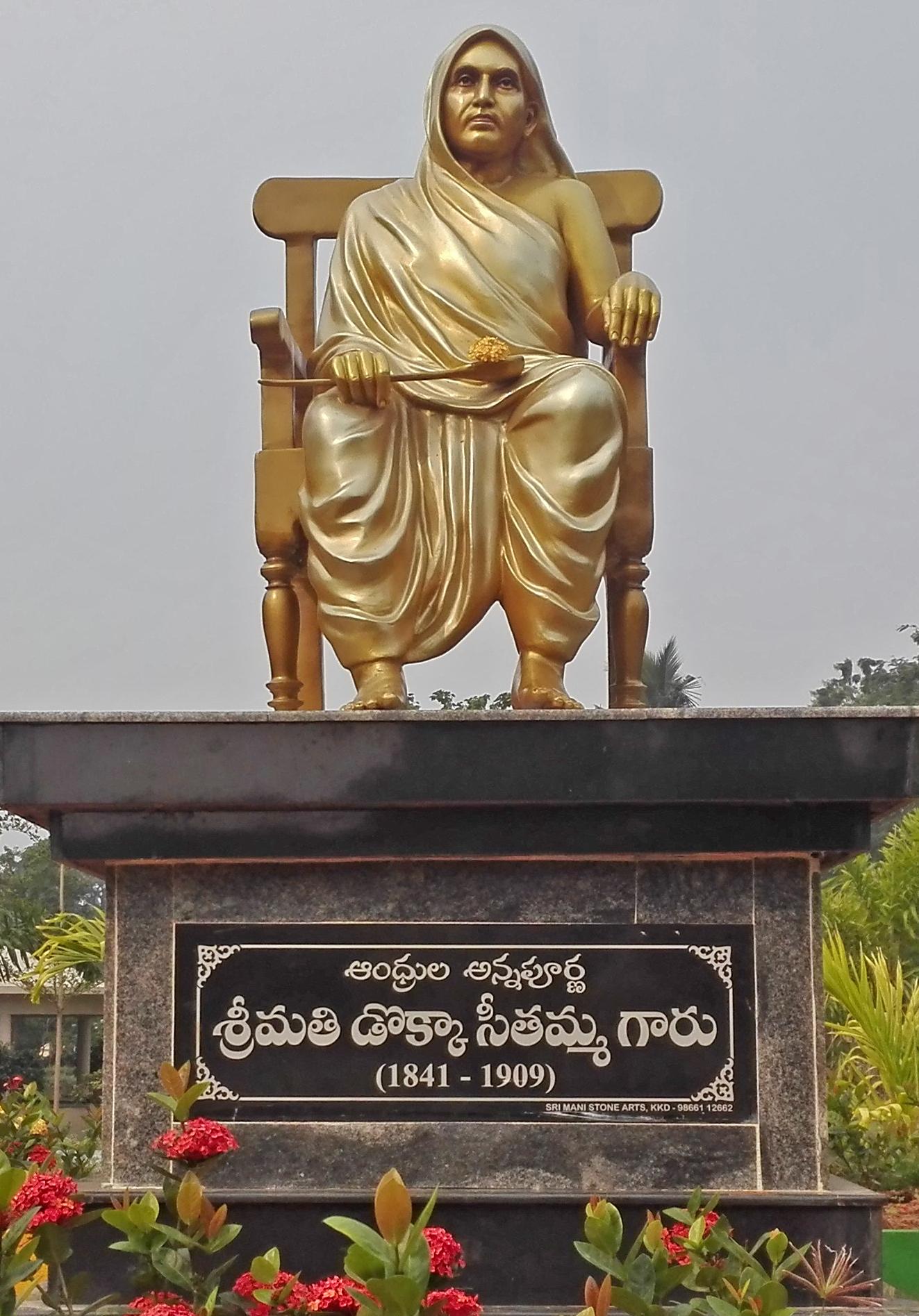
- Statue of Dokka Seethamma at Vivekananda Park in Kakinada, Andhra Pradesh, India
- Born: October 1841; Mandapeta, Rajahmundry District Madras Presidency (now Konaseema district, Andhra Pradesh, India)
- Died: 28 April 1909 (aged 67)
- Other names: Andhrula Annapurna; Apara Annapurna
- Occupations: Social Worker, Educationalist,
- Spouse: Dokka Joganna

Dokka Seethamma (or Sithamma; 1841–1909) was an Indian social activist who gained recognition by spending much of her life serving food for poor people and travellers. Dokka Joganna, a Vedic Scholar and farmer, married her, and this allowed her to offer food to the poor, which she did for more than 40 years.

== Early life and activism ==
Sreemathi Seethamma, born in 1841, was the daughter of Anappindi Bhavani Sankar from Mandapeta in Ramachandrapuram Taluk, East Godavari District. She lost her mother in childhood and was married to Dokka Jagganna from Lankalagannavaram. Dokka Seethamma was known for providing food to anyone in need at any time, regardless of caste or creed. This earned her the title of Nirathannadhatri. On one occasion, the local ruler tested her commitment. During a flood caused by the Godavari River and heavy rain, he disguised himself as an untouchable and called for Seethamma, asking for food. Despite her husband's warnings against crossing the river at night, Seethamma crossed it with a bowl of food. The river reportedly parted to allow her safe passage. After receiving the meal, the ruler revealed his identity and, impressed by her dedication, awarded her an Inam to support her continued efforts to provide free food to both the wealthy and the poor. Several Maharajas and Zamindars disguised themselves to assess whether Seethamma truly deserved her reputation and whether her feeding efforts surpassed their own. They concluded that she indeed deserved the acclaim she received.

== Death and legacy ==
Dokka Seethamma passed away in the Telugu year Sowmya on Vaisakha Suddha Navami, which corresponds to April 28, 1909. Seethamma was honored as a Hindu saint and called Apara Annapurna, a reincarnation of the goddess Annapurna. An aqueduct over the Vynateya river was named for her in 2000 and is marked with a bust depicting her.

Seethamma, known as Annapoorna due to her generosity in providing food to the poor and needy during the construction of the barrage and aqueduct by Sir Arthur Cotton, even served traditional food to a British Collector who was ill with fever. Her charitable work earned her recognition from John Edward, who invited her to his installation ceremony in London. Seethamma declined the invitation. However, on January 1, 1903, King Edward VII inaugurated her photograph in the main hall of the Royal Palace in London. This photograph was later seen by the then Hon. Speaker of the Lok Sabha, Sri GMC Balayogi, during his visit to the palace in 2000. In addition to Bhupathi Narayana Murthy, various Telugu writers have also authored books about her life and contributions.

In 1996, Doordarshan telecasted a serial on the life history of Smt. Sithamma. Famous TV (DD) serial Sri Maryadaramanna fame Sri Jayanthi Bhavani Sankaram played Sri Joganna role. The DD crew in all respects to complete their shooting works in our and the surrounding villages.

=== Dokka Seethamma Aqueduct ===
The P. Gannavaram aqueduct was originally built in 1859. In 2000, a new aqueduct and road bridge was constructed across the Vynateya River near Gannavaram. This new structure was designed to facilitate the crossing of the Gannavaram Canal and to irrigate 45,000 acres in the Nagaram island area. Former Lok Sabha Speaker Balayogi played a key role in the construction of this new aqueduct. The project was inaugurated by the then Minister for Major Irrigation, Mandava Venkateswara Rao, on July 22, 2000, and the aqueduct was named in honor of Dokka Seethamma.

=== Dokka Seethamma Canteens ===
Her legacy has inspired many modern social initiatives in the region, particularly related to food security and public welfare. For instance, recent political leaders have drawn inspiration from Seethamma's life in their initiatives to provide subsidized meals to the underprivileged. For example, the recent reopening of "Anna Canteens" in Andhra Pradesh is seen as a continuation of the spirit of service that Seethamma represented. These canteens offer meals at highly subsidized rates, ensuring that the state's poor have access to affordable food, much like the work Seethamma did in her lifetime. Additionally, Pawan Kalyan have proposed the establishment of Dokka Seethamma Canteens as a tribute to her legacy. The Government of Andhra Pradesh named the school meals program in her honor as the Dokka Seethamma Midday Meal.
