= Saagar K Chandra =

Indian film director and screenplay writer

Saagar K. Chandra
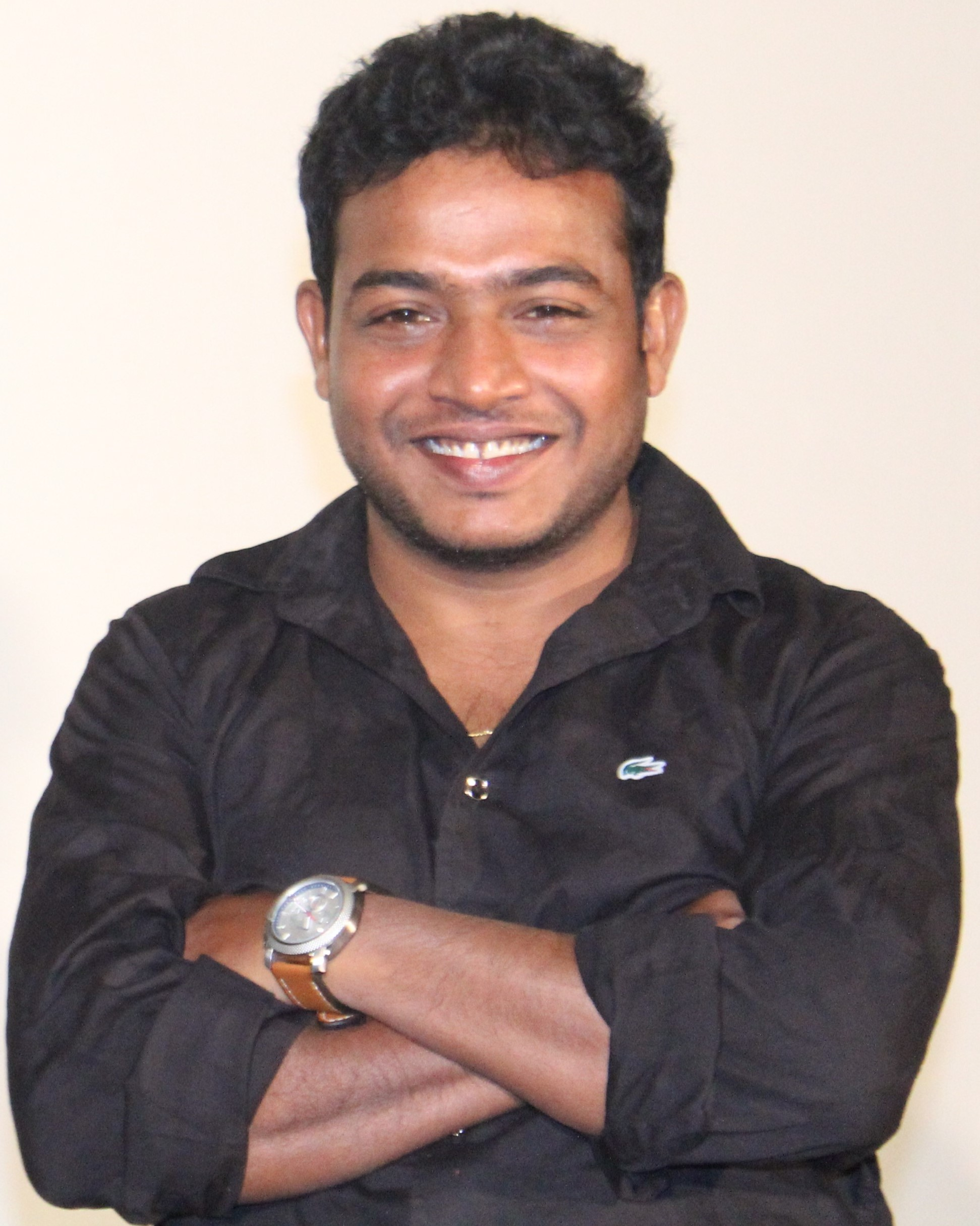
- Saagar K. Chandra
- Born: Kala Sagar; Nalgonda, India (Telangana)
- Education: Vasavi College of Engineering
- Occupations: Film director; screenwriter
- Years active: 2009–present
- Spouse: Geetha Reddy (m. 2017)

Saagar K. Chandra (born Kala Sagar) is an Indian film director and screenwriter who predominantly works in Telugu cinema. He made his directorial debut film in 2012 with Ayyare. He then directed Appatlo Okadundevadu (2016) and Bheemla Nayak (2022).

== Personal life ==
Chandra hails from Nalgonda district in present-day Telangana. He was born to Rama Chandra and Sunitha Reddy. His birthname was Kala Sagar, but he changed it to Saagar K. Chandra to suffix his father's name. He also has a sister, Gauthami Reddy. He did his schooling in Nalgonda and graduated from Vasavi College of Engineering in Hyderabad, (Note: In an earlier interview, Chandra stated that he graduated from Osmania University in Electrical Engineering) and later moved to the United States to pursue his Masters. In 2017, he married Geetha Reddy.

== Film career ==
He left his job in the US and moved back to Hyderabad in 2009 to pursue his career in films. He faced resistance from his family when he conveyed his interest in films, as he does not have a film background. He worked as an assistant director to Ravi Babu in Amaravathi (2009). He also worked with Madhura Sreedhar in the direction department. His first film as a director was Ayyare (2012), which got critical acclaim. Later, he directed Appatlo Okadundevadu (2016), which also critical acclaim and a commercial success as well.

In 2022, he directed the Telugu remake of Ayyappanum Koshiyum, titled Bheemla Nayak, starring Pawan Kalyan, Rana Daggubati and Nithya Menen, under Sithara Entertainments. Unlike the original, it received mixed reviews upon release, but it was a decent grosser at the box office, becoming Kalyan's highest-grosser of his career.

== Filmography ==
Year	Title	Credited as		Notes
Year	Title	Director	Writer	Notes
2012	Ayyare	Yes	Yes	Directorial debut
2016	Appatlo Okadundevadu	Yes	Yes	Nandi Special Jury Award
2022	Bheemla Nayak	Yes	No	
TBA	Tyson Naidu	Yes	Yes	
