= Bheemla Nayak =

2022 film directed by Saagar K Chandra

- Theatrical release poster
- Directed by: Saagar K. Chandra
- Written by: Story: Sachy; Screenplay & Dialogues: Trivikram Srinivas
- Based on: Ayyappanum Koshiyum (2020)
- Produced by: Naga Vamsi
- Starring: Pawan Kalyan Rana Daggubati
- Cinematography: Ravi K. Chandran
- Edited by: Naveen Nooli
- Music by: Thaman S
- Production company: Sithara Entertainments
- Release date: 25 February 2022
- Running time: 145 minutes
- Country: India
- Language: Telugu
- Budget: ₹75 crore (Note: The Times of India reported the budget as ₹75 crore.)
- Box office: ₹158.5 crore

Bheemla Nayak is a 2022 Indian Telugu-language action thriller film directed by Saagar K Chandra from a screenplay by Trivikram Srinivas. Produced by Naga Vamsi, the film stars Pawan Kalyan and Rana Daggubati in lead roles. It is an official remake of the 2020 Malayalam film Ayyappanum Koshiyum. Bheemla Nayak was filmed primarily in Hyderabad between January 2021 and February 2022 although temporarily halted by the COVID-19 pandemic. It has music composed by Thaman S with cinematography by Ravi K. Chandran and editing by Naveen Nooli.

It was theatrically released on 25 February 2022 and opened to positive reviews. The film netted ₹40 crore in India on its opening day and emerged as the best post-pandemic opener in Andhra Pradesh and Telangana.

== Plot ==
Daniel "Danny" Shekhar, an ex-Havaldar, and his driver cross the state border from Telangana to Andhra Pradesh at night. The police at the check post stop them for carrying liquor beyond the permissible quota, but a drunken Danny, who is furious that his sleep is disturbed, beats them up. SI Bheemla Nayak arrives and hits Danny, explaining his offense. Danny refuses, saying that his destination was in Telangana, but Nayak arrests him nonetheless, since Danny has physically crossed the border and entered Andhra. A constable humiliates Danny by removing his pancha, which further aggravates his anger.

The police file an FIR. After going through his phone contacts, they learn that Danny is the son of an influential politician and is connected to politically powerful men. Nayak informs the same to CI Kodanda Ram, who asks him to treat Danny with respect. Nayak tries to reconcile with Danny, who refuses to budge. Nayak threatens him with a gun, and they sit together. Danny then annoys Nayak for a drink. With no option left, Nayak opens a bottle of the seized liquor and serves it, which Danny secretly films on his phone. The following day, Danny is taken to court, where he is sentenced to 14 days imprisonment.

Danny's lawyer bails him out, subject to his biweekly appearance at the police station. In an act of vengeance, Danny releases the recorded video to the press. Nayak is arrested with an order to investigate his actions. Danny challenges Nayak in front of the police station. The villagers, who are staunch supporters of Nayak, try to attack Danny, but Nayak stops them by saying their fight is personal. A local toddy shop owner, Nagaraju, with a grudge against Nayak, joins hands with Danny. A senior politician arranges a truce between them, where Danny would delay sending the evidence to SP, and his mandatory appearance for two weeks would be waived. However, on the insistence of his father, Jeevan Kumar, Danny sends the evidence anyway, and Nayak is suspended. The following day, Nayak blows up Nagaraju's bar with explosives. Danny meets Nayak en route in a bus and tries to assert his dominance by saying that he made Nayak lose his job. Nayak replies that even if the battle is lost, he'd return to win the war.

The police seize Danny's vehicle and arrest the driver in retaliation. Meanwhile, Jeevan meets the SP and submits the evidence that Nayak's wife, Suguna, has indulged in smuggling by illegally buying forest goods from tribals, which results in her arrest warrant. Knowing this, Nayak and Suguna move along with their baby to a remote place in the forest. Jeevan's men, who track their location and steal Suguna's phone, threaten Nayak for her life. Furious, Nayak attacks Jeevan's men in a lodge. Danny is unaware of his father's actions and asks Nayak to stop beating them. But Nayak blows up Danny's vehicle, and they engage in a fight. The police arrive and stop them. Kodanda Ram tells Danny that the locals revere Nayak as an equivalent of the village deity Kokkira Devara, hence it's not wise to have a tussle with him. Danny learns that 15 years ago, Nayak killed a ruthless contractor who preyed on tribal girls to save them and was seen by the people as their protecting saviour.

Danny asks Jeevan whether they should compromise, but he refuses. On Jeevan's demand, the SP goes to their place and arrests Suguna, angering Nayak. He goes and meets Jeevan at his home and forces him to call Danny at gunpoint. Danny, who has Nayak's baby in custody, asks him to meet at Erra Thanda, a place outside the police jurisdiction of both states, for a final duel. They fight intensively, and just as Nayak is about to use his signature technique of removing an arm, Danny's wife arrives and pleads for mercy. Nayak recognizes her as one of the tribal girls he saved long ago and allows them to leave. They willingly withdraw the cases from each other. Nayak, who is transferred to Telangana, arrives at Danny's home. They reintroduce each other and shake hands.

== Cast ==
- Pawan Kalyan as SI Sarhad Bheemla Nayak
- Rana Daggubati as Ex-Havildar Daniel "Danny" Shekhar
- Nithya Menon as Suguna, Bheemla Nayak's wife
- Samyuktha as Kamali, Daniel's wife
- Samuthirakani as Jeevan Kumar, Daniel's father
- Rao Ramesh as Nagaraju
- Murali Sharma as CI Kodanda Ram
- Raghu Babu as Balaji
- Ravi Mariya as Home Minister
- Tanikella Bharani as MLA
- Ananth Babu as Public Prosecutor
- Harsha Vardhan as Daniel’s Lawyer
- Ravi Varma as Daniel’s Brother
- Shatru as Nagaraju's Henchmen
- Satya as Malpe Raju
- MS Chowdary
- Sanjay Swaroop
- Teja Kakamanu
- Narra Srinu
- Kadambari Kiran
- Chitti
- Pammi Sai
- Laxman Meesala
- Ramachandra Raju as a prisoner (cameo appearance in the song "Bheemla Nayak")
- Ayyappa P. Sharma as a prisoner (cameo appearance in the song "Bheemla Nayak")
- Brahmanandam as Judge K. B. Ananda Rao (cameo appearance)
- Sunil (cameo appearance in the song "Bheemla Nayak")
- Saptagiri (cameo appearance in the song "Bheemla Nayak")
- Hyper Aadi (cameo appearance in the song "Bheemla Nayak")

== Production ==
=== Development ===
In June 2020, Sithara Entertainments bought the Telugu remake rights of the 2020 Malayalam film Ayyappanum Koshiyum. Saagar K Chandra who earlier directed Appatlo Okadundevadu (2016) was signed to helm the project. Several actors including Ravi Teja, Nandamuri Balakrishna, and Rana Daggubati were approached for the lead role. In October 2020, the film was officially announced with Pawan Kalyan as one of the leads, in the role of a police officer originally played by Biju Menon.

In December, Rana was confirmed the other lead, playing the role of Prithviraj Sukumaran from the original. Rana later revealed that he was on board for the project before Kalyan signed in. He compared his character Daniel Shekar with his earlier role Arjun Prasad from his debut film Leader (2010). While both are aspiring politicians, he said that Daniel was "an entitled guy who played dirty."

The filming was officially launched with a pooja ceremony in Hyderabad. The film used a working title "Production No.12" and was colloquially referred as PSPK Rana Movie. The official title Bheemla Nayak was unveiled on 15 August 2021.

=== Casting ===
Writer-director Trivikram Srinivas was hired for the film's screenplay and dialogues. Thaman S was signed to compose the music with cinematography by Prasad Murella, editing by Naveen Nooli and production design handled by AS Prakash. In July 2021, Murella opted out of the project and cinematographer Ravi K. Chandran joined the film as the replacement.

Sai Pallavi was approached to play opposite Kalyan as Suguna, while Aishwarya Rajesh was cast to be a pair with Rana. In March 2021, reports emerged that Pallavi may not join the project but director Saagar K Chandra refuted them by stating that she would join the production in April. However, Pallavi eventually opted out due to scheduling conflicts. In July, Nithya Menen was cast in place of Pallavi while Samuthirakani is signed to play a pivotal role. In September, Aishwarya left the project due to scheduling conflicts. Samyuktha Menon was confirmed to replace her in October. In December 2021, Brahmanandam confirmed through an interview that he was playing a role in the film.

=== Filming ===
Principal photography of the film began in January 2021. A 25-day schedule took place at an aluminium factory in Hyderabad. In March, action scenes featuring Pawan Kalyan and Rana were shot under the choreography of Dhilip Subbarayan. The second schedule of film began in April. Later, the shoot was halted due to the second wave of COVID-19 pandemic in India. 30% of the shoot is completed by June 2021, and a special set was constructed in Hyderabad for the next schedule. Filming resumed in July 2021. A new schedule began in December 2021, filming took place at Madanpalle Yellamma Temple in Vikarabad. Final sequences, including a promotional song featuring Kalyan were shot in February 2022. The shoot was wrapped up on 17 February 2022, a week ahead of its scheduled release.

== Music ==
The film's soundtrack is composed by Thaman S in his second collaboration with Pawan Kalyan after Vakeel Saab. The audio rights were acquired by Aditya Music label for a sum of ₹5.04 crore (US$520,000).

== Release ==
=== Theatrical ===
Bheemla Nayak was released on 25 February 2022 one day later after the release of Valimai starring Ajith Kumar and Kartikeya Gummakonda. Earlier in July 2021, it was announced that the film would release on 12 January 2022, coinciding with the festival of Sankranti. However, in December 2021, it was postponed to 25 February 2022 after requests by producers D. V. V. Danayya, Vamsi, and Dil Raju as their films RRR and Radhe Shyam were scheduled to release at the same time. Later in January 2022, the makers announced their intention to release the film either on 25 February or 1 April, whichever datewas conducive for a theatrical release due to the prevailing COVID situation.

In mid-February, the makers confirmed that the fil would be released theatrically on 25 February 2022.

The film's global theatrical rights were sold for ₹102.5 crore, including the rights of Telugu states which were pegged at ₹84.3 crore.

Surprising many, the film did little to no on ground marketing to promote the film, barring the pre release event. The audience showed up in theatres mainly on the basis of the star pull of Pawan Kalyan and Rana Daggubati, and promotional content released online, like the trailer and the songs.

Doing no on-ground marketing in star-led films became a trend starting with this film, with Pawan Kalyan's very next venture Bro, and the Prabhas starrer pan-India movie Salaar:Part 1 - Ceasefire, employing the same strategy.

The pre-release event of the film, scheduled to take place on 21 February 2022 was postponed to 23 February in the wake of death of Andhra Pradesh's Minister Mekapati Goutham Reddy as a sign of respect.

In February 2022, vandals slashed screens in movie theatres playing the film in the Toronto area.

=== Home media ===
The digital distribution rights of the film were acquired by Disney+ Hotstar and Aha, while the satellite rights were acquired by Star Maa. The film was originally scheduled to stream on Disney+ Hotstar and Aha on 25 March 2022, but it ended up streaming a day earlier, on 24 March 2022.

== Reception ==
=== Box office ===
As per Times of India, Bheemla Nayak grossed over ₹192 crore worldwide in 20 days of its theatrical run. (Note: The Times of India reported the film's worldwide gross to be ₹210.37 crore in 20 days. But, the closing collections of the film are not reported.) On its opening day, the film grossed ₹52.1 crore worldwide, including ₹43.1 crore in the domestic territory and US$1 million from overseas. The film netted ₹37 crore in India and emerged as the best post-pandemic opener in Andhra Pradesh and Telangana. In its opening weekend, the film grossed ₹110 crore worldwide, of which ₹70 crore came from India, and the rest from the overseas. The film grossed ₹50 crore in 6 days, with the distributor's share standing at ₹55 crore.

After 10 days of its theatrical run, the film collected a worldwide distributor's share of ₹92.25 crore, with a gross of ₹148.6 crore. The film became a profitable venture in the United States, grossing $2.4 million in 11 days.

=== Critical reception ===
Bheemla Nayak received mixed-to-positive reviews from the critics and audience, who praised the film for "terrific mass elements" and "intense confrontation scenes". On the review aggregator website Rotten Tomatoes, 60% of 5 critics' reviews are positive, with an average rating of 5.5/10.

Writing for The Hindu, Sangeetha Devi Dundoo termed Bheemla Nayak "racy, masala-laden adaptation," praising the screenplay, score and cinematography. Thadhagath Pathi of The Times of India also echoed the same while opining that the climax could have been fleshed out better. On performances, Pathi wrote: "Bheemla Nayak is an example of what makes Pawan Kalyan such a huge star [..]. Rana Daggubati is top notch and this film is proof of how well he can act. Nithya Menen is decent in her role but it's Samyuktha Menon who delivers a mature performance."

Ram Venkat Srikar of Cinema Express wrote, "Although it is largely faithful to the central conceit of the original, Bheemla Nayak is bigger, fiercer, and massier." While saying Bheemla Nayak traded "depth for whistles", Srikar felt that this choice did "more good than harm" to the film. Hindustan Times's Haricharan Pudipeddi opined that despite not recreating the original's magic, the remake still worked in its own ways, owing to "Kalyan's machismo" and "Daggubati's impressive performance." Sankeertha Varma of Firstpost felt that Trivikram not only tried to retain the essence the original but also successfully weaved mythology around his protagonists, in addition to a flashback that tied the loose ends.

A Deccan Chronicle reviewer called the film an "engaging experience," and wrote: "The director has managed the extremely difficult task of engaging the audience with a simplistic, single-thread plot, through with his writing." Janani.K of India Today wrote that "the remake turned out to be better than original, that has been spruced up with masala and mass moments but wisely have cut short the runtime as well".

On the other hand, The Indian Express critic Manoj Kumar R was critical of the film for deviating much from the original, stating: "In Bheemla Nayak, we get no sense of the place where the story plays out. The film is a very shallow reading of the text of Ayyappanum Koshiyum."

=== Accolades ===
Award (Note: Awards, festivals and organizations are in alphabetical order.)	Date of ceremony (Note: Date is linked to the article about the awards held that year, wherever possible.)	Category	Recipient(s)	Result	Ref.
Filmfare Awards South	2024	Best Actor – Telugu	Pawan Kalyan	Nominated	
Filmfare Awards South	2024	Best Actress – Telugu	Nithya Menen	Nominated	
Filmfare Awards South	2024	Best Supporting Actor – Telugu	Rana Daggubati	Won	
Filmfare Awards South	2024	Best Music Director – Telugu	Thaman S	Nominated	
Filmfare Awards South	2024	Best Female Playback Singer – Telugu	K. S. Chithra ("Antha Ishtam")	Nominated	
SIIMA	2023	Best Supporting Actor – Telugu	Rana Daggubati	Won	
