= Sekhar Puli =

Indian-American executive, philanthropist (born 1973)

- Born: January 1973 (age 52–53)
- Education: George Mason University (MS) Georgetown University (MBA)
- Occupation: Executive
- Political party: JanaSena Party
- Spouse: Malini Puli
- Children: 2

Sekhar Puli is an Indian-American executive and philanthropist. He is the Managing Partner at AROA Ventures, a venture capital and growth equity investment firm based out of Delhi, India. He was the former president and chief executive officer of ArchLynk, founder and managing partner of REAN Cloud and the founder of Asha-Jyothi non-profit organization.

== Early life and education ==
Puli was born in Machilipatnam, Andhra Pradesh, India and moved to the United States in 1995 as a student. He earned a graduate degree in computer science from George Mason University and completed an International MBA program at Georgetown University in 2003. He is of Telugu descent.

== Career and education ==
Puli is a graduate of George Mason University and Georgetown University. Puli founded REAN Cloud, an IT service management company, in 2013, alongside Sri Vasireddy. In July 2018, Hitachi Vantara announced their plans to acquire REAN Cloud for an undisclosed sum. The acquisition was completed October 2018.

In February 2019, Puli announced that he was leaving REAN Cloud to join JanaSena party as chairman. In September 2020, AgroWave announced a funding round from Puli worth $500,000.

In 2022, Puli became the Global CEO of ArchLynk, a supply chain management company. Sekhar led the acquisition of Krypt inc, Novigo and WCS Consulting. In 2024, Puli joined Aroa Ventures, a venture capital firm, as a general partner.

== Philanthropy ==
Puli is the founder and director of Asha-Jyothi Foundation, a non-profit organization based in Virginia. It has since expanded to educate over 6,000 children annually, while also organizing recurring medical camps. In 2019, Puli made a $2 million donation to construct an Innovation Lab for Fairfax High School. In 2022, he was awarded the Lord and Lady of Fairfax County title for his donations.

== Personal life ==
He is married to Malini Puli and has two daughters.
