= Ayyare =

- Movie Poster
- Directed by: Saagar K. Chandra
- Screenplay by: Saagar K. Chandra
- Story by: Saagar K. Chandra
- Produced by: Sudhakar Babu Bandaru; Sri Rangana Achhappa
- Starring: Rajendra Prasad; Sivaji; Anisha Singh; Sai Kumar
- Cinematography: Samalabhasker
- Edited by: Prawin Pudi
- Music by: Sunil Kashyap
- Production company: Preetam Productions
- Release date: 20 January 2012
- Running time: 135 mins
- Country: India
- Language: Telugu

Ayyare is a 2012 Indian Telugu-language comedy film written and directed by Saagar K Chandra. It is produced by Sudhakar Babu Bandaru and Sri Rangana Achhappa under the Preetam Productions. It stars Rajendra Prasad, Sivaji and Anisha Singh, with music composed by Sunil Kashyap.

== Cast ==
- Rajendra Prasad as Prasad / Swamiji / Lord Krishna
- Sivaji as Venkatesam
- Anisha Singh as Anjali "Bujjamma"
- Sai Kumar as ACP Gajapathi
- M. S. Narayana as Venkatesh's maternal uncle
- Ali as Software Engineer
- Venu Madhav as Venu Bhai
- Dr. Siva Prasad as Siva Prasad
- Harsha Vardhan
- Sameer as Doctor
- Prasad Babu as Krishna Rao, Venkatesh's father
- Sandhya Janak as Venkatesh's mother
- Shankar Melkote as Dr. Shankar Melkote
- Srinivasa Reddy as Srinu
- Dhanraj as Venkatesh's acolyte
- Devi Charan as Konda
- Prudhviraj as Police Inspector
- Tarzan as Goon
- Jenny as Postman
- Baby Anjali as Prasad's daughter

== Soundtrack ==
Ayyare

Film score by Sunil Kashyap
- Released: 2012
- Genre: Soundtrack
- Length: 23:41
- Label: Madhura Audio
- Producer: Sunil Kashyap

Music was composed by Sunil Kashyap. Music was released on MADHURA Audio Company.

No.	Title	Lyrics	Singer(s)	Length
1.	"Telusuna"	Ananta Sriram	Sunil Kashyap	4:31
2.	"2012"	Vijay Kumar	Hemachandra	3:35
3.	"Chitti Guvva"	Ananta Sriram	Vijay Prakash	4:39
4.	"Na Gundelo"	Ananta Sriram	Sandhya	2:43
5.	"Sami Sami"	Chandrabose	Rakesh, Asalam	4:05
6.	"Telusuna (Remix)"	Ananta Sriram	Sunil Kashyap	4:08
Total length:				23:41

== Reception ==
The Times of India rated the film 2.5/5 and wrote, "Though the film is made on a tight budget, the director’s attempt to tackle the subject of mindless idolization of Godmen and fake babas is laudable." 123telugu called the film "thought provoking" and stated: "It nicely captures the innocence with which people blindly follow many fake ‘Babas’ these days. The movie is entertaining and captivating in the second half. Tighter screenplay and better narration in the first half would have greatly helped matters."
