= Akkada Ammayi Ikkada Abbayi =

- Poster
- Directed by: E. V. V. Satyanarayana
- Written by: Screenplay: E. V. V. Satyanarayana Dialogues: Satyanand
- Based on: Qayamat Se Qayamat Tak by Nasir Hussain
- Produced by: Allu Aravind
- Starring: Pawan Kalyan; Supriya Yarlagadda
- Cinematography: S. Gopal Reddy
- Edited by: Vellaiswamy
- Music by: Koti
- Production company: Geetha Arts
- Release date: 11 October 1996
- Running time: 150 minutes
- Country: India
- Language: Telugu
- Box office: ₹4.25 Crore (Share)

Akkada Ammayi Ikkada Abbayi (transl. There's the girl, here's the boy) is a 1996 Indian Telugu-language film directed by E. V. V. Satyanarayana. Produced by Allu Aravind under Geeta Arts Banner, the film stars Pawan Kalyan (credited as Kalyan) and Supriya in their debuts. The music of the film was composed by Koti. It is an official remake of the 1988 Hindi film Qayamat Se Qayamat Tak. The film marks the debut of Kalyan, the younger brother of Chiranjeevi, in the Telugu film industry. It is also the debut film appearance of Supriya, the granddaughter of Akkineni Nageswara Rao. Kalyan’s performance and martial arts skills received significant attention.

== Plot ==
Harichandra Prasad and Vishnu Murthy are two wealthy and powerful rivals in a village. Harichandra Prasad's daughter Supriya and Vishnu Murthy's son Kalyan study in the same residential college, where they both engage in few quarrels and bets. Kalyan and his gang attempt to enter a girls' hostel and succeed at last, and he wins a bet with Supriya. Slowly their love blossoms amid these petty quarrels and they return to their village, where they are separated at the railway station by their parents. Their vacation ends and Kalyan reaches the railway station to get back to his college, but Supriya does not turn up. Kalyan learns that Supriya would not be returning to college as her marriage has been fixed. He gets off the train to reach Supriya's house. But he is thrashed by Harichandra Prasad and his men. Meanwhile, Supriya's wedding is postponed due to her grandmother's death. Using this to their advantage, Kalyan and Supriya elope. Her brother and his men become involved in a fight with Kalyan. In the end, Vishnu Murthy saves Harichandra Prasad from drowning, and everyone realises their mistake. They reunite the lovers and get them married.

== Cast ==
- Pawan Kalyan as Mullapudi Kalyan (credited as Kalyan Babu)
- Supriya Yarlagadda as Supriya
- Nassar as Harichandra Prasad
- Chandra Mohan as Chandra Shekhar
- Sarath Babu as Vishnu Murthy
- Ahuti Prasad as Srihari Rao
- Allu Ramalingaiyah as Principal
- Kota Srinivasa Rao as Suleman
- Brahmanandam as Pilaka Govinda Sastry
- Babu Mohan as Peter
- Mallikarjuna Rao as Esupadam
- AVS as S.I.
- Gokina Rama Rao
- Raja Ravindra as Raja
- Visweswara Rao as Kalyan's classmate
- Tirupathi Prakash as Kalyan's classmate
- Ironleg Sastri as Pilaka Gajapada Sastry
- Ashok Kumar
- Kavitha as Rajeswari
- Sudha as Lakshmi
- Attili Lakshmi
- Kovai Sarala as Julie
- Kalpana Rai as Nookalamma
- Madhu as rowdy
- Ooha as Shanti (Cameo appearance)
- Rambha as item number "Chaligali Jummandi"
- Sunil (Deleted scene)

== Production ==
Ravi Raja Pinisetty was initially set to direct Akkada Ammayi Ikkada Abbayi. However, Pinisetty felt that producer Allu Aravind would not invest enough in the project, so he decided to step down. He informed Kalyan of his decision, clarifying that there was no misunderstanding between them.

The film employed a unique marketing campaign prior to its release. Initially, posters featuring Kalyan were released with the question, "Who is this guy?". Later, before the film's release posters declaring "This is our Kalyan" further heightened audience interest. The anticipation was also fueled by Kalyan's connection as Chiranjeevi's brother.

== Soundtrack ==
The music is composed by Koti. Lyrics are written by Veturi. The music was released on Lahari Music.

No.	Title	Singer(s)	Length
1.	"Time Time"	S. P. Balasubrahmanyam	4:52
2.	"Baava Baava"	S. P. Balasubrahmanyam, Chitra	5:12
3.	"Priya Sakhi Om"	S. P. Balasubrahmanyam, M. M. Srilekha	5:05
4.	"Chaligali Jummandi"	Mano, Chitra	5:29
5.	"Premanna Chinnamatalone"	S. P. Balasubrahmanyam, Chitra	4:58
6.	"Muddu Muddu Pillo"	S. P. Balasubrahmanyam, Chitra	5:13
7.	"O Daivama"	S. Janaki	5:10

== Reception ==
Andhra Today wrote, "Kalyan is good only in dance and action scenes. Supriya makes little impact with her histrionics. It is a disappointing film from all departments".
