= Alapati Venkataramaiah =

Indian politician (1917–1965)

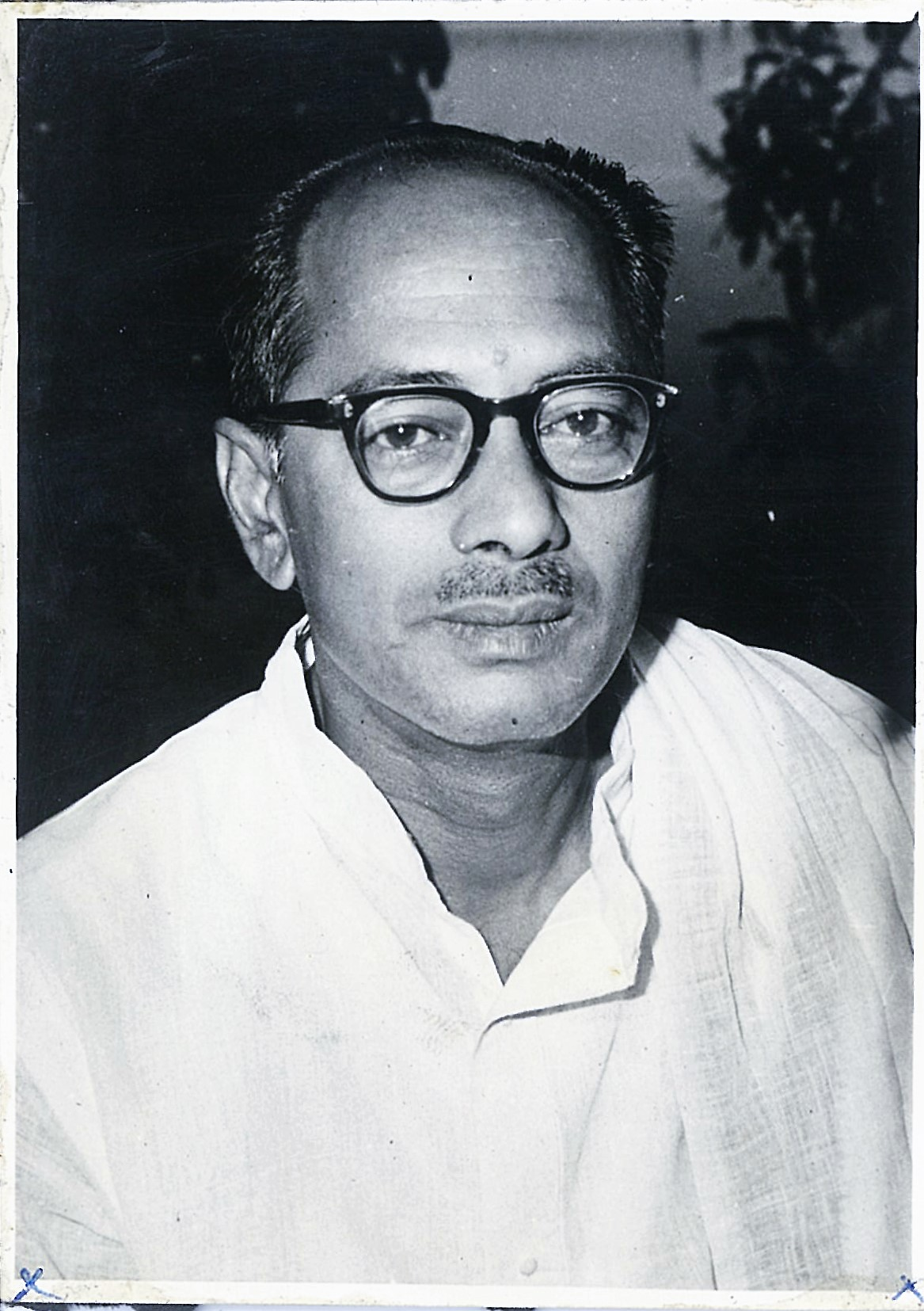

Member of Legislative Assembly Andhra Pradesh
- In office 1956–1967
- Preceded by: Andhra Pradesh Assembly Created
- Succeeded by: Indira Doddapaneni
- Constituency: Tenali
- In office 1953–1956
- Preceded by: Andhra State Assembly Created
- Succeeded by: Andhra Pradesh Assembly Created
- Constituency: Tenali
- In office 1952–1953
- Preceded by: Constituency Established
- Succeeded by: Andhra State Assembly Created
- Constituency: Tenali

Alapati Venkataramaiah (9 September 1917 – 16 June 1965) was a freedom fighter and government minister from Andhra Pradesh, India. He represented Tenali in the Andhra Pradesh Legislative Assembly for four consecutive terms from 1952 to 1965.

== Early life ==
Venkataramaiah was born on 9 September 1917 to an anfluent agricultural family in the village of Edlapalli, about seven kilometres from Tenali Town in Guntur district. His parents were Alapati Anjaiah Garu and Smt Chellamma Garu. In those years when there were no proper schools in the villages, Sri Alapati Venkataramaiah Garu completed only primary school. But as a generous and kind-hearted person he knew the needs of the community, in fact some elders say his lack of higher education was a blessing in disguise in some ways as it left him pure and simple. When his well-wishers mentioned to him that having a degree would have helped him, he used to say that to live honestly and fulfill one's responsibilities effectively that degrees were not required.

== Early career ==
As an animal lover he enjoyed conducting races for bulls and horse carts in his village in the name of eminent freedom fighter Desoddaraka Kasinathuni Nageswara Rao in 1940. That was the first time races were held on such a large scale in Guntur district. He conducted Kabaddi and volleyball tournaments also in his twenties. Attracted by the freedom struggle going on in the country he took part in the Quit India movement in 1942. He worked undercover supplying money, clothes and food to the people participating in the movement. He along with Bayankarachari and Seshagiri Rao were a trio who worked closely. In one such operation while he was on his way back from Alipore camp jail after meeting some freedom fighters, he was arrested by Police with 3 revolvers on him. He was arrested and kept in Bellary police station. He had a childhood friend who was the Munsif in the Hospet court on whose guarantee he was released on bail. This laid a very good foundation for his career in the Congress party.

One notable fact that made the Congress party take notice of this young leader was his victory in the first Madras Legislative Assembly Elections of 1952. There was a large communist wave sweeping across the Telugu land and political stalwarts such as Kasu Bramhananda Reddy, Kalluri Chandramouli, Kakani Venkatratnam, Yarlagadda Sivaram Prasad, Bezwada Gopal Reddy and Neelam Sanjeeva Reddy all lost this election. Out of 17 seats in the combined Guntur and Prakasam district, the Congress party could only win 4 seats, with the Communists and Socialists winning the remaining 13. But Mr Alapati won his seat with a majority of over 8,000 votes, leading to the popular moniker of the 'Iron Man' in Guntur District.

His seniors both in age and politically were Mr Kala Venkata Rao, Mr Mantena Venkat Raju, Mr Kalluri Chandramouli and his guide, mentor and best friend Mr Neelam Sanjeeva Reddy. They were fondly called the Pancha Pandavas with Mr Alapati the youngest of them.

== Highlights and important events in his Life ==
09/08/1942 Entered the Quit India Movement.

1946 Organized a stop for the special train taking Gandhiji near his village and ensured thousands of people could get a glimpse of Mahatma.

25/01/1950 Unanimously elected as the chairman of Guntur District Cooperative Central Bank and continued to be re elected for 5 times in the same post until 1962.

1952 Elected as MLA in the first ever Assembly elections after Independence. Won consecutively from Tenali in 1955 (by-election), 1957 and 1962.

1951 President of the Guntur District Congress.

1959 Became the Municipal Chairman Tenali.

12/03/1962 Took oath as Municipal Administration Minister in Neelam Sanjeeva Reddy Cabinet. Proved himself as an able administrator by Amending the old Municipal act.
Envisioned, planned and laid the foundation for KPHB Housing colony Phase I and II in Hyderabad by convincing the CM and the state cabinet against heavy odds due to its distance from the city back then.
'S.R Nagar' built in the name of his mentor and friend was his pet project, to which many people in the colony acknowledge him till date and proof of his far sightedness.
Planned and implemented the beautification of TankBund in Hyderabad. The Bund was widened to include gardens and a Restaurant. As part of first phase 1.5 km of Bund was widened and more money was to be allocated in the next budget before he died.
As Municipal Administration and Housing minister he considered 'Vizag' as his second home. Major developments he did during his tenure was the expansion of Tatipudi Reservoir to supply drinking water to city and also to the steel plant. In those days the beach road between Harbour and Andhra university was not connected end to end there was Indian navy's Coastal battery in the middle, people had to travel an extra 1.5 km. The Navy was unwilling to part with land to the Vizag corporation to connect the missing link. A Sardarji was the Navy official Mr Alapati appointed another Sardarji Mr Ajith singh as commissioner of Vizag. Both the Sardar's worked and Mr Alapati was successful in acquiring Navy land and connect the road end to end. He also had built quarters for professors in Vizag medical college. Kirlampudi layout was developed during his tenure.

24/05/1964 Took oath as Endowments Minister in Mr Kasu Brahmananda Reddy Cabinet in addition to Municipal administration portfolio he already had. This proves the trust the party and specifically Mr. Brahmananda Reddy who was considered his opponent (same district) had on his abilities.

Took the initiative of amending the 1930 Endowments Act and entrusted the powers to Endowment department.
His cabinet colleagues included Marri Chenna Reddy, Raja Yarlagadda Sivaram Prasad, M R Apparao, PVG Raju, Gurumurthy, P. V. Narasimha Rao and Mrs. Sadalakshmi.

== Developments in Tenali during Alapati's Tenure ==
1959 Built RanaRanga Chowk in Tenali a memorial for 7 people who lost their lives in Police firing near Railway station during the Quit India Movement.

1962 Built the Railway overbridge in Tenali. At that time was the first between Vijayawada and Chennai.

1962 Laid foundation for Underground Drainage Drainage scheme in Tenali. First town to have this facility in AP.

1/12/1962 Established I T I in Tenali.

01/07/1963 Started JMJ College for Women in Tenali.

01/05/1961 Started the First Cooperative Ayurveda Pharmacy in AP named Bharadwaja Co operative Pharmacy.

1961 Started the first Co operative Printing press in AP

Built the Current Municipal Office Building of Tenali

Built the Municipal market Pucca buildings.

== Death and legacy ==
He had an early and untimely death on 16 June 1965 at a young age of 48 when as a minister in Mr Brahmananda Reddy's Cabinet. His political legacy was carried on by his daughter Smt Doddapaneni Indira who was elected to Tenali assembly 3 consecutive times in 1967, 1972 and 1978. She was also the first woman and directly elected Guntur Zilla Parishad chairman in 1987. Unfortunately just like her father she died in 1987 at the age of 50. The legacy of Alapati Venkatramiah continued further with his granddaughter Dr Gogineni Uma elected as an MLA from Tenali in 1999 and to date continues her services in the name of her mother and grandfather as a politician and also as the leading gynaecologist in Tenali.

2017 being the centenary year of Mr Alapati's birth, his followers and family held year long celebrations culminating in a grand event at Tenali with a book released on life of Mr Alapati written by Dr Ch Baba Vali Rao and the unveiling of a bronze statue by Hon. Vice-president Mr. Venkaiah Naidu on 26 August.
