= Tirupati laddu =

Indian sweet

- Geographical indication
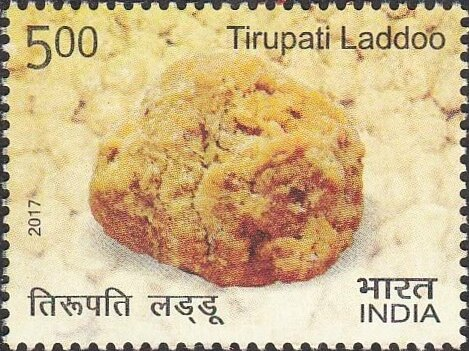
- Tirupati Laddu on Indian stamp
- Alternative names: శ్రీవారి లడ్డూ -- Srivari Laddu
- Description: Laddu sweet offered as Naivedhyam to Lord Sri Venkateswara, at Tirumala Venkateswara Temple of Tirupati
- Type: Foodstuff
- Area: Tirupati, Andhra Pradesh
- Country: India
- Registered: 2009
- Material: Gram flour, cashew nuts, cardamom,
- Official website: http://www.tirumala.org

Tirupati laddu, also known as Tirumala laddu or Srivari laddu, is a popular sweet offered as prasadam at the Venkateswara Temple in Tirupati, Andhra Pradesh, India. First introduced in 1715, the laddu evolved from a sweet called Manoharam and is now prepared in the temple's kitchen, Laddu Potu, by the Tirumala Tirupati Devasthanams (TTD). Over 600 people, including skilled cooks known as Pachakas, are involved in its production. The laddu received a Geographical Indication (GI) tag in 2009 to protect its authenticity. There are variations of the laddu, including the Proktham Laddu and Asthanam Laddu. In 2024, it was at the centre of a controversy over alleged adulteration, leading to investigations and a purification ritual.

== History ==
The practice of offering laddus at the Tirumala Venkateswara Temple began on 2 August 1715. Initially prepared as a loose, chunky sweet known as Manoharaṃ, the laddu underwent several modifications over the centuries. By the 21st century, it had gained significant prominence, becoming an iconic prasad associated with Lord Venkateswara. The preparation of this sweet has historical roots that trace back to the Pallava dynasty, with references in inscriptions from the 1480s. The current spherical form of the laddu was standardized under the Madras Government in 1940. Today, the preparation of laddus at the temple employs around 620 people, including 270 cooks, and modern methods have been adopted to enhance efficiency.

== Geographical indication tag ==
To prevent black marketing of Tirupati laddus, in 2008, the Tirumala Tirupati Devasthanams registered for a geographical indication tag. In 2009, it obtained rights to Tirupati laddus under the category of foodstuff under the GI Act 1999. This has prevented others from preparing or naming the sweet with the same name. In 2017, as part of their cuisine series, the India Post unveiled a postal stamp that commemorated the Tirupati Laddu.

=== Laddu potu ===
The kitchen where Tirupati laddus are prepared has been referred to since olden days as Laḍḍū pōṭu. It lies inside the Sampangi pradakshinam of the temple. The Potu is equipped with three conveyor belts used for carrying ingredients into the potu and finished laddus to the selling counters from Potu. Out of three conveyor belts the first one installed during 2007 can transfer only laddus and the second installed in the year 2010 can transfer both Laddus and Būṃdi. The third conveyor belt was installed in 2014 as a backup for the two conveyor belts should they malfunction. In olden days only firewood was used to cook laddus, which was replaced by LPG in the year 1984.

Tirumala Tirupati Devasthanams prepare an average of 2.8 lakh laddus a day in the Laḍḍū pōṭu. At present, the pōṭu can make 800,000 laddus a day.

=== Dittam ===
Diṭṭam is the list of ingredients, and their proportions used in the making of Tirupati laddu in adherence with Agamas. To meet the increasing demand for laddus, changes were made to Dittam six times in its history. At present the ingredients include Gram flour, cashew nuts, cardamom, ghee, sugar, sugar candy and raisins. Per day it uses about 10 tonnes of Gram flour, 10 tonnes of sugar, 700 kg of cashew nuts, 150 kg of cardamom, 300 to 500 litres of ghee, 500 kg of sugar candy and 540 kg of raisins used to prepare laddu. TTD procures all these items based on tenders yearly.

=== Paricharakas ===
Paricharakas, traditionally known as Pōṭu kārmikulu are the skilled cooks in the temples under the Tirumala Tirupati Devasthanams (TTD). They are responsible for preparing the Naivedyam, the sacred food offerings for the deities, and managing the temple kitchens. These cooks hold a significant position within the temple hierarchy, second only to the priests (Arcaka) and scholars (Adhyāpaka). Despite their important role, they have long been referred to as Pōṭu kārmikulu, a term they feel does not reflect the dignity of their work. The term Pāricharaka derived from Sanskrit, is preferred as it better honors their traditional and spiritual role in the temple. In the Laḍḍū pōṭu alone, around 620 cooks work to prepare the laddus, with 150 being regular employees and over 350 on a contract basis, including 247 chefs.

== Tirupati laddu variations ==
=== Proktam Laddu ===
The Proktam Laddu is regularly distributed to all the common pilgrims visiting the temple. It is small in size and weighs 165-175 grams. These laddus are prepared in large numbers.

=== Astanam Laddu ===
The Āstānaṃ Laḍḍū is prepared only on special festive occasions. It is large and weighs 750 grams. It is prepared with more cashews, almonds, and saffron strands.

=== Kalyanotsavam laddu ===
The Kaḷyānōtsavaṃ Laḍḍū is distributed to devotees who participate in Kalyanotsavam and in a few Arjitha seva. There is a huge demand for these laddus. These are prepared in very few numbers when compared to the Proktham Laddu. The Shelf life of the laddu is about 15 days with the advanced packaging system implemented by TTD.

== Laddu distribution ==
Due to high demand, both domestically and internationally, TTD noticed that Tirupati laddus were being sold at inflated prices in black markets. To address this, TTD identified middlemen involved in these activities and implemented measures to curb black marketing. Devotees can now receive laddus by presenting darshan tokens, and those not attending darshan must present an Aadhaar card to purchase up to two laddus per day. Additionally, TTD has expanded the distribution of laddus to affiliated temples and information centres in cities like Chennai, Bangalore, Amaravati, and Visakhapatnam. These steps have improved access to laddus and reduced black market activities.

== 2024 adulteration allegations ==
On 19 September 2024, the Chief Minister of Andhra Pradesh, Chandrababu Naidu, claimed that the Tirupati laddu contained beef tallow, fish oil, and pig lard in its ingredients during the administration of the former Chief Minister, Y. S. Jagan Mohan Reddy. The following day, a laboratory report from Gujarat suggested findings that some interpreted as confirmation of these allegations, leading to concerns among certain Hindu communities and devotees. The laboratory, established in 2009 by the National Dairy Development Board a statutory body of the Indian government, conducted tests that raised questions about the integrity of the prasadam served at the temple. A subsequent news report clarified that the claims were linked to a consignment of ghee produced by a Tamil Nadu dairy firm, with rejected batches of ghee not utilized in the preparation of the laddu prasadam. This clarification aimed to address concerns regarding the religious sanctity of the offerings.

=== Response to Allegations ===
In light of the allegations, the Tirumala Tirupati Devasthanams (TTD) took prompt action. The Central Health Ministry issued a show cause notice to the ghee-supplying company after one of the tested samples failed quality checks, indicating adulteration. Additionally, a purification ritual known as Shanti Homam was conducted at the temple to help restore devotees' confidence and ensure the sanctity of the prasadam. Former TTD chairman Y. V. Subba Reddy approached the Supreme Court, requesting the formation of an independent committee led by a retired apex court judge to investigate the claims. Furthermore, TTD established a sensory panel to assess food samples based on aroma, taste, and texture to mitigate future controversies related to prasadam quality.

The controversy surrounding the Tirupati Laddu also drew reactions from various political figures and celebrities. Political leader Pawan Kalyan raised concerns about adherence to worship protocols under the previous administration, referencing incidents he claimed involved the desecration of temples. Meanwhile, Tamil actor Karthi apologized to Pawan Kalyan for his earlier comments regarding the controversy, reflecting the political sensitivity surrounding the issue. Prominent actor Prakash Raj's comments to brush off the laddu controversy attracted criticism from leaders of the ruling NDA government such as Pawan Kalyan.

In response to the allegations regarding the adulteration of the Tirupati laddu, Y. S. Jagan Mohan Reddy, head of the YSR Congress Party, called upon devotees across Andhra Pradesh to participate in special poojas on September 28, 2024. He urged the public to address what he termed false claims regarding the use of animal fat in the preparation of the laddu prasadam, highlighting the significance of restoring the temple's sanctity. Reddy expressed concern that the allegations could mislead devotees and tarnish the esteemed image of the Tirumala Tirupati temple. He stated that the sanctity of the temple and its offerings had been undermined by the claims, which he suggested may have been motivated by political interests. The YSRCP has denied allegations regarding the quality of ghee supplied to the temple, asserting that all protocols were observed by the Tirumala Tirupati Devasthanams (TTD). In a letter to Prime Minister Narendra Modi, Reddy emphasized that the processes in place at TTD were designed to ensure the quality of ingredients used in the preparation of prasadam. He reiterated that any ghee found to be substandard was not allowed into the temple's premises, underscoring the necessity to maintain the sanctity of the temple's offerings amid the controversy.

=== Supreme Court intervention and SIT investigation ===
Following the allegations, Andhra Pradesh officials announced the formation of a Special Investigation Team (SIT) to investigate the claims of adulteration in the prasadam. The team, comprising officers of IGP rank and above, was tasked with submitting a report to the government to inform further actions. This initiative aimed to thoroughly address any concerns about the quality of prasadam and maintain the trust of devotees in the temple's offerings. Social media also played a role in the controversy, with various platforms witnessing discussions and skits about the issue. Some content creators faced backlash for perceived insensitivity towards Hindu sentiments and were compelled to remove their videos in light of public criticism.

On September 30, 2024, the Supreme Court stated that there was no conclusive evidence to suggest using animal fat in preparing Tirupati laddus during the previous YSR Congress Party (YSRCP) regime. The Court criticized Andhra Pradesh Chief Minister N. Chandrababu Naidu for making public statements without solid proof, stating that religious matters should not be politicized. The Special Investigation Team (SIT), formed by the Andhra Pradesh government to probe the allegations, was halted following the Supreme Court's instructions. The investigation was paused pending further orders from the Court, scheduled for October 3.

During the hearing, Justices B.R. Gavai and K.V. Viswanathan questioned the Chief Minister's decision to publicize unverified claims, noting that the lab test results did not clearly show contamination of the ghee used in the 'Prasadam'. The Court asked the Solicitor General Tushar Mehta to advise on whether the SIT should proceed or if the investigation should be handed over to an independent agency. Meanwhile, AP Deputy Chief Minister Pawan Kalyan clarified that the Court did not confirm the laddus were unadulterated, stressing that his government would continue investigating violations from the previous regime once the Court allows.

=== Varahi declaration ===
On October 3, 2024, the deputy chief minister of Andhra Pradesh, Pawan Kalyan called for a public meeting at Tirupati where he lamented partisan attitudes towards the issues related to Hindu temples, the prevalence of pseudo-secularism and the dire need for the formation of a national board to safeguard the sanctity of temples. In this regard, he announced the Varahi declaration, a 7-articled document to protect the Hindu interests and the need for non-cooperation to forces that show anti-Hindu sentiment.

== See also ==
- List of geographical indications in India
