= Uddanam nephropathy =

Medical condition

Uddanam nephropathy is a chronic kidney disease (CKD) that is endemic in the Uddanam region of Andhra Pradesh in India. Nephropathy on an endemic scale was first reported in Andhra Pradesh in the 1990s. In 2015, over 34,000 cases of kidney disease were recorded in the region, and it was estimated that at least 4,500 people had died from it in the last ten years. Its cause has not been found yet, and according to the WHO, it is "the least understood and the least publicized" nephropathy of unknown origin.

== Risk factors ==
The search for possible causes has yielded some statistically significant relations. A prevalence study published in 2020 has shown that:

- Farmers had a 20% higher CKD prevalence than non-farmers,
- rice farming was associated with CKD, while coconut, cashew, vegetable and fruit production were not,
- there was no association with using pesticides or fertilizers, or cleaning pesticide-contaminated clothing,
- the nephropathy was more prevalent in older people, and consumers of alcohol and chewing tobacco.

Gender, hypertension and diabetes were not significantly associated with this disease.

== Similar diseases ==
The Balkan endemic nephropathy was found to be caused by chronic intake of aristolochic acid, while the causes of Mesoamerican nephropathy that occurs in sugar cane cutters, Uddanam nephropathy and the Sri Lankan chronic kidney disease are still not clear despite years of research efforts. A review notes a "striking similarity" between these diseases; they all occur in a clustered fashion among rural agricultural workers who have to carry out a lot of physical work under hot climatic conditions.
