= Tenali Assembly constituency =

Constituency of the Andhra Pradesh Legislative Assembly, India

Coordinates: 16.24°N 80.64°E

Tenali
- Constituency No. 91 for the Andhra Pradesh Legislative Assembly
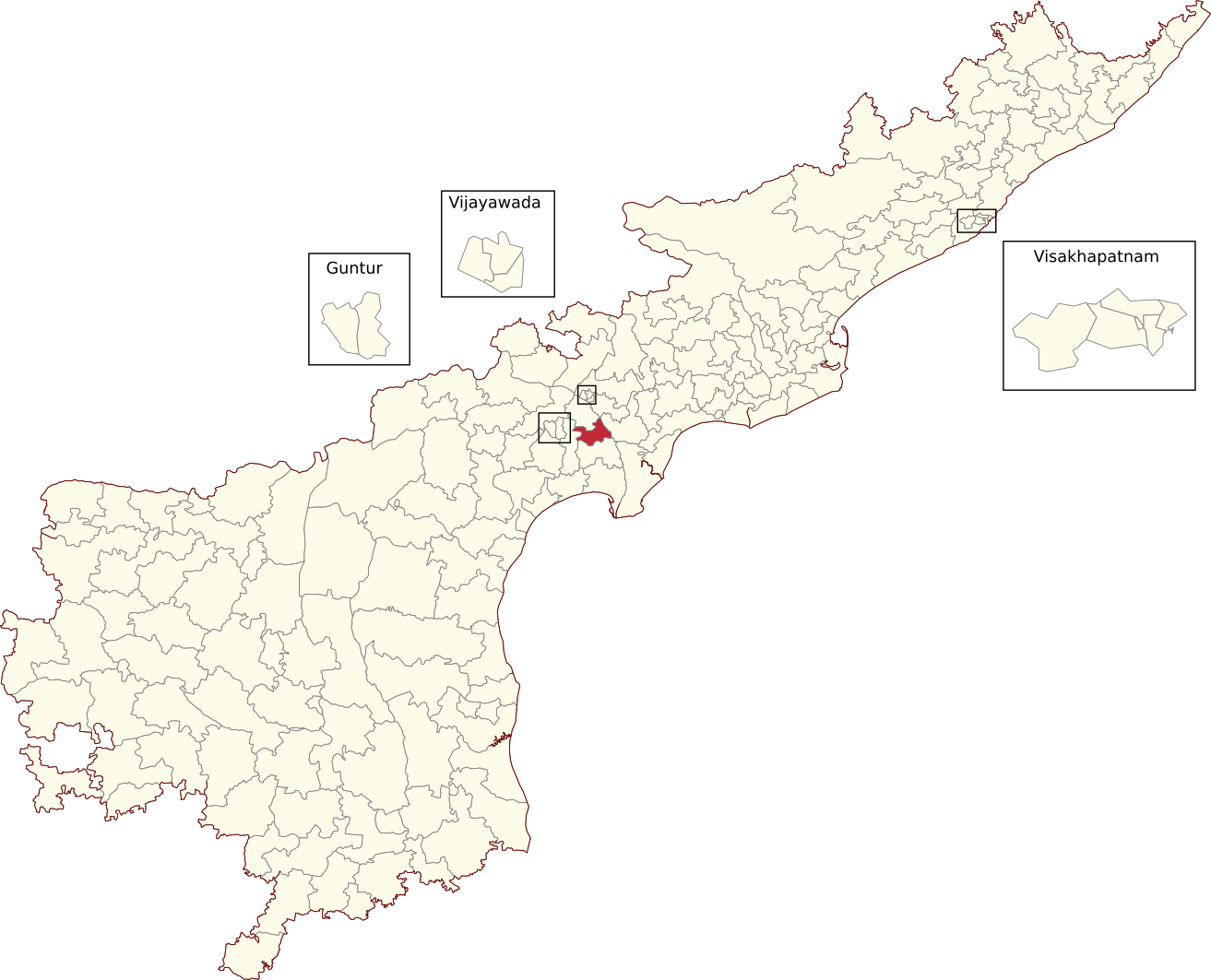
- Location of Tenali Assembly constituency within Andhra Pradesh

Constituency details
- Country: India
- Region: South India
- State: Andhra Pradesh
- District: Guntur
- Lok Sabha constituency: Guntur
- Established: 1951
- Total electors: 262,998
- Reservation: None

Member of Legislative Assembly
- 16th Andhra Pradesh Legislative Assembly
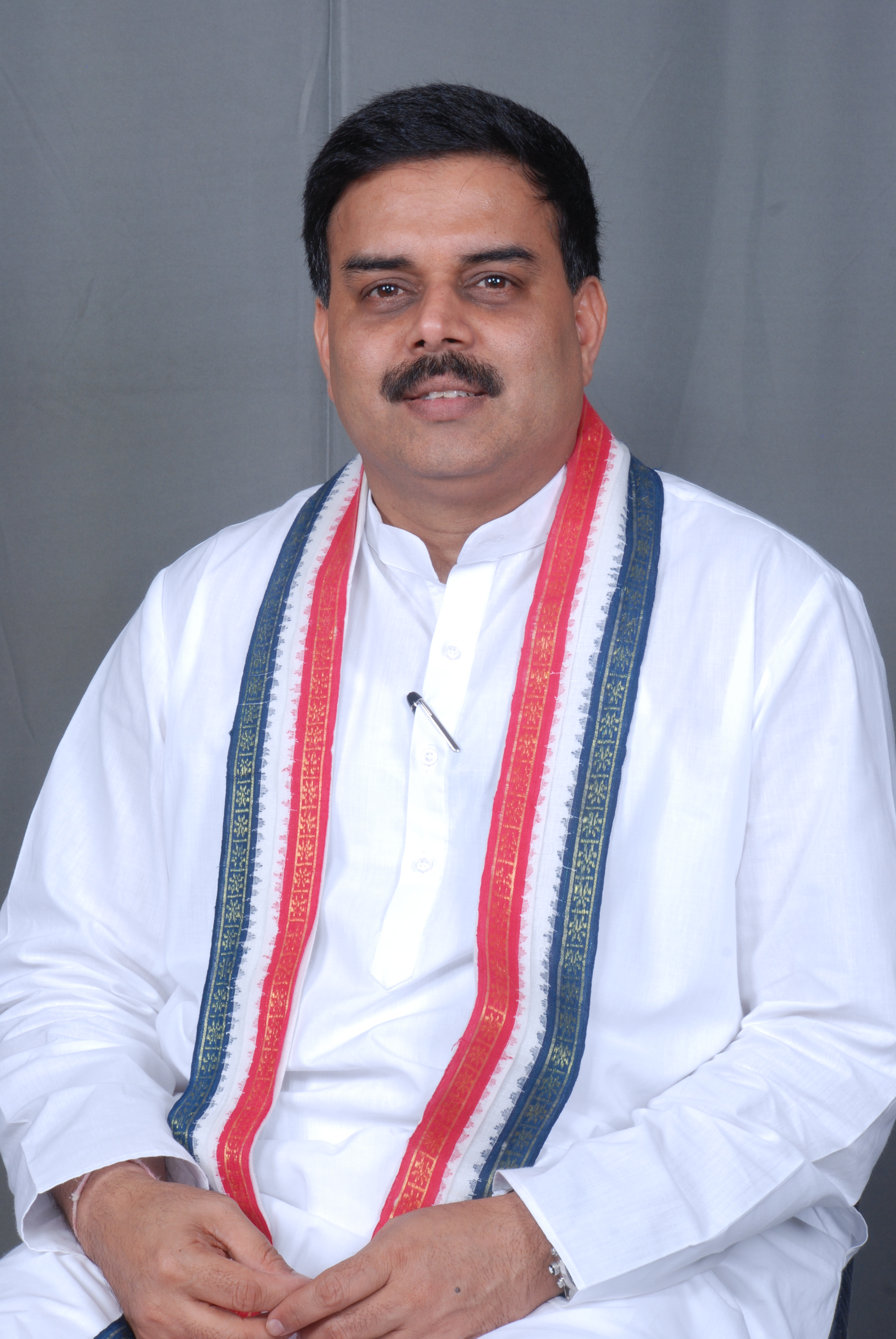
- Incumbent Nadendla Manohar
- Party: JSP
- Alliance: NDA
- Elected year: 2024

Tenali Assembly constituency is a constituency in Guntur district of Andhra Pradesh that elects representatives to the Andhra Pradesh Legislative Assembly in India. It is one of the seven assembly segments of Guntur Lok Sabha constituency.

Nadendla Manohar is the current MLA of the constituency, having won the 2024 Andhra Pradesh Legislative Assembly election from Janasena Party. As of 2019, there a total of 262,998 electors in the constituency. The constituency was established in 1951, as per the Delimitation Orders (1951).

== Mandals ==
There are two mandals in this constituency.

Mandals in Tenali Assembly Constituency

Mandal
Tenali
Kollipara

== Members of the Legislative Assembly ==
Year	Member	Political party
1952	Alapati Venkataramaiah	Indian National Congress
1955	Alapati Venkataramaiah	Indian National Congress
1962	Alapati Venkataramaiah	Indian National Congress
1967	Doddapaneni Indira	Indian National Congress
1972	Doddapaneni Indira	Independent
1978	Doddapaneni Indira	Janata Party
1983	Annabathuni Sathyanarayana	Telugu Desam Party
1985	Annabathuni Sathyanarayana	Telugu Desam Party
1989	Nadendla Bhaskara Rao	Indian National Congress
1994	Ravi Ravindranath	Telugu Desam Party
1999	Gogineni Uma	Telugu Desam Party
2004	Nadendla Manohar	Indian National Congress
2009	Nadendla Manohar	Indian National Congress
2014	Alapati Rajendra Prasad	Telugu Desam Party
2019	Annabathuni Siva Kumar	YSR Congress Party
2024	Nadendla Manohar	Janasena Party

== Election results ==
=== 1952 ===
1952 Madras State Legislative Assembly election: Tenali
Party	Candidate	Votes	%	±%
INC	Alapati Venkataramaiah	19,484	43.10	43.10
KLP	Ravi Satyanarayana	11,407	25.23	
Socialist Party (India)	Nannapaneni Venkata Rao	10,344	22.88	
KMPP	Putta Ragheviah	2,855	6.32	
	Kotemraju Krishna Rao	1,114	2.46	
Margin of victory		8,077	17.87	
Turnout		45,204	72.38	
Registered electors		62,455		
INC win (new seat)				

=== 1955 ===
1955 Andhra State Legislative Assembly election: Tenali
Party	Candidate	Votes	%	±%
INC	Alapati Venkataramaiah	24,698	60.09	
CPI	Ravi Ammaiah	16,403	39.91	
Margin of victory		8,295	20.18	
Turnout		41,101	75.35	
Registered electors		54,550		
INC hold		Swing		

=== 1962 ===
1962 Andhra Pradesh Legislative Assembly election: Tenali
Party	Candidate	Votes	%	±%
INC	Alapati Venkataramaiah	26,122	49.77	
CPI	Ravi Ammaiah	19,924	37.96	
Margin of victory		6,198	11.81	
Turnout		53,389	80.79	
Registered electors		66,081		
INC hold		Swing		

=== 1967 ===
1967 Andhra Pradesh Legislative Assembly election: Tenali
Party	Candidate	Votes	%	±%
INC	Indira Doddapaneni	44,909	71.67	
Independent	S.Chintamaneni	12,574	20.07	
Margin of victory		32,335	51.60	
Turnout		64,342	75.27	
Registered electors		85,487		
INC hold		Swing		

=== 1972 ===
1972 Andhra Pradesh Legislative Assembly election: Tenali
Party	Candidate	Votes	%	±%
Independent	Indira Doddapaneni	38,889	53.47	
INC	Venkata Rao Nannapaneni	33,136	45.56	
Margin of victory		5,753	7.91	
Turnout		73,803	77.47	
Registered electors		95,272		
Independent gain from INC		Swing		

=== 1978 ===
1978 Andhra Pradesh Legislative Assembly election: Tenali
Party	Candidate	Votes	%	±%
JP	Indira Doddapaneni	39,368	51.05	
INC(I)	Venkata Rao Nannapaneni	37,358	48.45	
Margin of victory		2,010	2.61	
Turnout		78,208	81.37	
Registered electors		96,111		
JP gain from Independent		Swing		

=== 1983 ===
1983 Andhra Pradesh Legislative Assembly election: Tenali
Party	Candidate	Votes	%	±%
TDP	Annabathuni Satyanarayana	53,729	68.13	
INC	Indira Doddapaneni	24,505	31.07	
Margin of victory		29,224	37.06	
Turnout		79,837	70.72	
Registered electors		112,893		
TDP gain from JP		Swing		

=== 1985 ===
1985 Andhra Pradesh Legislative Assembly election: Tenali
Party	Candidate	Votes	%	±%
TDP	Annabathuni Satyanarayana	43,332	52.55	
INC	Indira Doddapaneni	38,743	46.99	
Margin of victory		4,589	5.57	
Turnout		83,261	68.90	
Registered electors		120,838		
TDP hold		Swing		

=== 1989 ===
1989 Andhra Pradesh Legislative Assembly election: Tenali
Party	Candidate	Votes	%	±%
INC	Nadendla Bhaskara Rao	57,828	59.10	
TDP	Annabathuni Satyanarayana	39,255	40.12	
Margin of victory		18,573	18.98	
Turnout		99,916	71.70	
Registered electors		139,346		
INC gain from TDP		Swing		

=== 1994 ===
1994 Andhra Pradesh Legislative Assembly election: Tenali
Party	Candidate	Votes	%	±%
TDP	Raavi Ravindranath	43,483	46.26	
INC	Nadendla Bhaskara Rao	29,952	31.87	
Margin of victory		13,531	14.40	
Turnout		95,040	66.16	
Registered electors		143,644		
TDP gain from INC		Swing		

=== 1999 ===
1999 Andhra Pradesh Legislative Assembly election: Tenali
Party	Candidate	Votes	%	±%
TDP	Gogineni Uma	51,399	52.28	
INC	Konijeti Rosaiah	46,005	46.79	
Margin of victory		5,394	5.49	
Turnout		100,030	64.81	
Registered electors		154,343		
TDP hold		Swing		

=== 2004 ===
2004 Andhra Pradesh Legislative Assembly election: Tenali
Party	Candidate	Votes	%	±%
INC	Nadendla Manohar	53,409	55.75	
TDP	Gogineni Uma	40,803	42.59	
Margin of victory		12,606	13.16	
Turnout		95,870	69.06	
Registered electors		138,813		
INC gain from TDP		Swing		

=== 2009 ===
2009 Andhra Pradesh Legislative Assembly election: Tenali
Party	Candidate	Votes	%	±%
INC	Nadendla Manohar	61,582	36.57	
TDP	Alapati Rajendra Prasad	58,698	34.86	
PRP	Kilari Venkata Rosaiah	37,678	22.56	
Majority		2,884	1.71	
Turnout		168,400	78.09	
INC hold		Swing		

=== 2014 ===
2014 Andhra Pradesh Legislative Assembly election: Tenali
Party	Candidate	Votes	%	±%
TDP	Alapati Rajendra Prasad	93,524	48.91	
YSRCP	Annabathuni Siva kumar	74,459	38.94	
INC	Nadendla Manohar	15,511	8.20	
Majority		19,065	9.96	+8.25
Turnout		191,232	84.75	+6.66
TDP gain from INC		Swing		

=== 2019 ===
2019 Andhra Pradesh Legislative Assembly election: Tenali
Party	Candidate	Votes	%	±%
YSRCP	Annabathuni Siva Kumar	94,495	45.92	
TDP	Alapati Rajendra Prasad	76,846	37.35	
JSP	Nadendla Manohar	29,905	14.53	
Majority		17,649	8.67	
Turnout		205,768	78.15	−6.51
YSRCP gain from TDP		Swing		

=== 2024 ===
2024 Andhra Pradesh Legislative Assembly election: Tenali
Party	Candidate	Votes	%	±%
JSP	Nadendla Manohar	123,961	60.18	
YSRCP	Annabathuni Siva Kumar	75,849	36.82	
BSP	Karumanchi Sunil Sundeep	2,188	1.06	
NOTA	None of the above	1,412	0.69	
Majority		48,112	23.36	
Turnout		2,05,996	76.16	
JSP gain from YSRCP		Swing		

== See also ==
- List of constituencies of the Andhra Pradesh Legislative Assembly
- Duggirala (Assembly constituency)
