= Uddanam =

Region in the Indian state of Andhra Pradesh

Uddanam is a region in the Indian state of Andhra Pradesh. It is spread over some portions of the districts of Srikakulam district and covering mandals of Ichchapuram, Kanchili, Kaviti, Sompeta and Vajrapu Kotturu. The Government of India set up a dialysis center in the region.

In 2019 State government planned to implement permanent solution for this issue and called tenders to construct Hospital and also started drinking water project for people of Uddanam. The leading infrastructure company MEIL acquired the tender and finished the plan by 2024 January. MEIL executed the Uddanam Drinking Water Project.
