= Pawan Kalyan =

Indian politician and actor (born 1971)

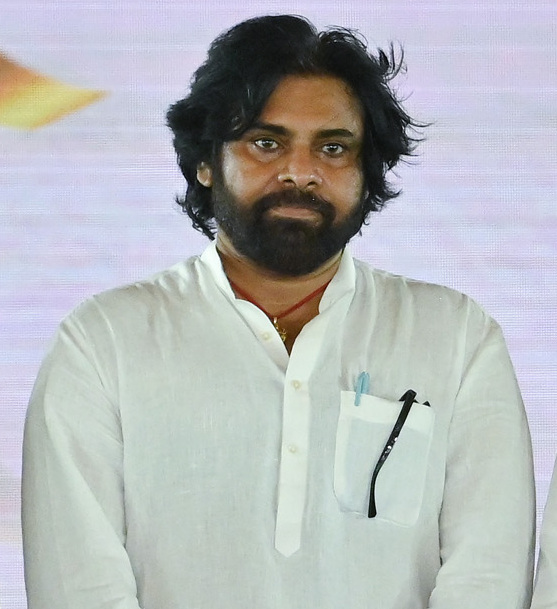
- Kalyan as 2024

11th Deputy Chief Minister of Andhra Pradesh
- Incumbent
- Assumed office 12 June 2024
- Governor: S. Abdul Nazeer
- Chief Minister: N. Chandrababu Naidu
- Preceded by: List: Budi Mutyala Naidu; Kottu Satyanarayana; Rajanna Dora Peedika; Amzath Basha Shaik Bepari; K. Narayana Swamy
Additional ministries
Incumbent
Assumed office 12 June 2024
Ministry and Departments	Panchayat Raj; Rural Development and Rural Water Supply; Environment; Forests; Science and technology
Preceded by	Budi Mutyala Naidu (as Minister of Panchayat Raj and Rural Development); Peddireddy Ramachandra Reddy (as Minister of Environment, Forest, Science and Technology)

Member of Andhra Pradesh Legislative Assembly
- Incumbent
- Assumed office 4 June 2024
- Preceded by: Pendem Dorababu
- Constituency: Pithapuram

Founder-President of the Janasena Party
- Incumbent
- Assumed office 14 September 2014
- Preceded by: office established

Personal details
- Born: Konidela Kalyan Babu; 2 September 1971 (age 55) Bapatla, Andhra Pradesh, India
- Other political affiliations: Janasena Party (2014-Present) Praja Rajyam Party (2008–2011)
- Spouses: Nandini (m.1997; sep.1999; div. 2008); Renu Desai (m. 2009; div. 2012); Anna Lezhneva (m. 2013; div. 2026)
- Children: 4
- Relatives: See Konidela–Allu family
- Occupation: Actor; politician

Konidela Pawan Kalyan (born Konidela Kalyan Kumar; 2 September 1971) is an Indian politician, actor, philanthropist, and martial artist serving as the 11th Deputy Chief Minister of Andhra Pradesh since June 2024. He also serves as the Minister for Panchayat Raj, Rural Development and Rural Water Supply; Environment, Forest, Science and Technology in the Government of Andhra Pradesh as MLA representing the Pithapuram constituency. He is the founder and president of the Janasena Party.

He is among the highest-paid actors in Indian cinema and has been featured in Forbes India's Celebrity 100 list multiple times since 2012. He is the recipient of a Filmfare Award and a SIIMA Award among other accolades. As an actor, Kalyan is known for his distinctive style and mannerisms in Telugu cinema. He enjoys a huge fanbase across the Telugu states. He is the younger brother of veteran actor Chiranjeevi.

Kalyan made his acting debut in the 1996 film Akkada Ammayi Ikkada Abbayi. Then, he had a streak of six consecutive hits, among which Tholi Prema (1998), Thammudu (1999), Badri (2000), and Kushi (2001) became blockbusters. In 2001, he became the first ever South Indian brand ambassador for Pepsi. He made a comeback with Jalsa (2008), the highest-grossing Telugu film of that year, and continued with success streak with Gabbar Singh (2012), Attarintiki Daredi (2013), Gopala Gopala (2015), and Bheemla Nayak (2022). He received the Filmfare Award for Best Actor for Gabbar Singh. Both Kushi and Attarintiki Daredi.

In March 2014, Pawan Kalyan founded the Janasena Party (JSP). He has been active in state politics and was elected from the Pitapuram constituency by a margin of over 70,000 votes, subsequently becoming the deputy chief minister in 2024. Kalyan also holds a black belt in Karate. He is also known for his philanthropic work, supporting various social causes.

== Early life ==
Pawan Kalyan was born as Konidela Kalyan Kumar on 2 September 1968 in a Telugu family to Konidela Venkata Rao and Anjana Devi in Bapatla, Andhra Pradesh. Venkata Rao worked as an excise police constable and was transferred on a regular basis.

Kalyan was educated at the St. Joseph's High School in Nellore and later in Madras (now Chennai). In 1997, he was awarded the title "Pawan" by the Isshin-ryū Karate Association after a public martial arts demonstration. He also holds a black belt in Karate.

== Acting career ==
=== 1996–1997: Early work ===
Kalyan made his acting debut in 1996 with Akkada Ammayi Ikkada Abbayi directed by E. V. V. Satyanarayana. It was produced by Allu Aravind under Geeta Arts Banner, and co-starred Supriya Yarlagadda, granddaughter of Akkineni Nageswara Rao. The film employed a unique marketing campaign prior to its release. Initially, posters featuring Kalyan were released with the question, "Who is this guy?". Later, before the film's release, posters declaring "This is our Kalyan" further heightened audience interest. Released in October 1996, the film was a moderate success at the box-office. Kalyan’s performance and martial arts skills received significant attention.

His second film Gokulamlo Seeta (1997), a drama film released the following year. It was directed by Muthyala Subbaiah and starred Kalyan alongside Raasi and Harish. In the film, Kalyan plays a spoiled rich youth who transforms his reckless ways and fights against societal and familial opposition to win his love. Gokulamlo Seeta was the first film where Kalyan was credited as 'Pawan Kalyan' after he was awarded the title "Pawan" in March 1997. It was a commercial success.

=== 1998–2001: Success streak and stardom ===
Kalyan's third film was Suswagatham (1998) directed by Bhimaneni Srinivasa Rao and produced by R. B. Choudary under the Super Good Films banner. It starred Kalyan and Devayani (in her Telugu debut), with music composed by S. A. Rajkumar. Kalyan was first credited with the title Power Star in this film. In the film, Kalyan played a young man who loses everything due to his blind love for a girl. His performance in the film was critically acclaimed. Suswagatham sowed the seeds for Kalyan's rise to stardom. The film became a super hit at the box office.

Kalyan's next film was Tholi Prema (1998), directed by A. Karunakaran and co-starring Keerthi Reddy with music by Deva. Karunakaran saw Pawan Kalyan's photo on a Telugu film magazine cover in Chennai and thought he was perfect for the lead in his romantic film. After sharing the script with Kalyan, Kalyan introduced him to producer G. V. G. Raju, who had worked with him on Gokulamlo Seeta. The film was a major hit, launching Kalyan into stardom and becoming a classic romantic film in Telugu cinema. It won the National Film Award for Best Feature Film in Telugu, six state Nandi Awards, and was featured at the 30th International Film Festival of India. The film was remade in Kannada as Preethsu Thappenilla (2000) and in Hindi as Mujhe Kucch Kehna Hai (2001).

In November 1998, there were reports of Kalyan collaborating with Malayalam director Fazil for a project to be produced by G. V. G. Raju, who had earlier produced Tholi Prema. However, his next film turned out to be Thammudu, where he played the role of a kickboxer. Released in July 1999, Thammudu was written and directed by P. A. Arun Prasad. The film collected a distributor share of ₹9.25–9.46 crore, emerging as a blockbuster and generating a profit of over ₹4 crores for buyers. It became the second-highest-grossing film in the Nizam region after Choodalani Vundi (1998). Kalyan's performance as a youth competing in a kickboxing contest was widely acclaimed. The film's success led to it being remade in Tamil as Badri (2001), in Kannada as Yuvaraja (2001) and in Bengali as Champion (2003).

Next, Kalyan acted in Puri Jagannadh's first directorial venture, Badri (2000). It starred debutants Ameesha Patel and Renu Desai (whom he would later marry). It was produced by T. Trivikrama Rao and the music was composed by Ramana Gogula. The film became a blockbuster at the box office. Badri played a crucial role in expanding Pawan Kalyan's appeal from class audiences, who admired his earlier hits to a broader mass audience. The intense scenes between Pawan Kalyan and Prakash Raj remain a significant highlight in Pawan's career. The film's dialogues and songs were huge hits with the youth.

Kalyan's next film was Kushi (2001) co-starring Bhumika. It was directed by S. J. Surya and produced by A. M. Rathnam. Mani Sharma provided the score and soundtrack. Kalyan also choreographed all the action sequences in the film. Initially begun in 1999 as a bilingual along with its Tamil version, also titled Kushi (2000), the Telugu version was delayed due to Kalyan's prior commitment to Badri. It was a blockbuster at the box office and went on to become the highest-grossing Telugu film ever at the time. The film was critically acclaimed for its screenplay, music, cinematography and especially the performance of Pawan Kalyan. Kushi was the culmination of a streak of six consecutive hits for Pawan Kalyan and his style, mannerisms and dialogues from the film were much imitated by the youth.

The four consecutive blockbuster hits—Tholi Prema, Thammudu, Badri, and Kushi—had a cult status among youth at the turn of the millennium. Pawan Kalyan became a youth icon, setting trends in action sequences, style, and fashion. These films gave him a massive fanbase, distinct from his elder brother Chiranjeevi's. In 2001, Kalyan became the first South Indian brand ambassador for Pepsi, while Chiranjeevi promoted Coca-Cola.

=== 2003–2007: Directorial debut and career fluctuations ===
Kalyan's next film was Johnny (2003), which he wrote, directed, and starred in alongside Renu Desai. Produced by Allu Aravind with music by Ramana Gogula, the martial arts film featured Kalyan as a coach who fights to fund his wife's cancer treatment. Johnny had the highest theatrical distribution rights of ₹21 crore for a Telugu film at the time and was released with over 250 prints worldwide. Kalyan's clean-shaven look was a departure from his usual style which disappointed many fans. Despite being Pawan Kalyan's first flop after six consecutive hits, the film was praised for its stylish and grounded action choreography. Kalyan's styling from the film became a trend, with Johnny T-shirts, bandanas, armbands, and caps becoming very popular. It was also screened at the International Film Festival of India.

In 2004, his film Gudumba Shankar was released. The film was directed by Veera Shankar and produced by Kalyan's older brother Nagendra Babu under Anjana Productions banner. Kalyan played the title role, wrote the screenplay and choreographed three songs. The action scenes were also conceived and choreographed by him. The film, starring Kalyan and Meera Jasmine, received mixed reviews and was an average performer at the box office. Kalyan's choreography of the realistic action scenes was praised. His unique style, including wearing double pants, grabbed attention at the time.

His next film Balu (2005) was A. Karunakaran's second directorial starring Kalyan, after Tholi Prema. This film was produced by C. Aswini Dutt under Vyjayanthi Movies banner. It co-starred Shriya, Neha Oberoi and Gulshan Grover. Balu was extensively filmed in Delhi and Agra, with a special set constructed near the Taj Mahal and another in Ramoji Film City, Hyderabad, at a cost of ₹90 lakh. Pawan Kalyan wore a unique pant in the film's flashback scenes, which he bought from Italy for about ₹2 lakh. These pants later became a trend among the youth. Balu was the first Telugu film to have a release in South Africa and became an average grosser at the box office.

In May 2006, Bangaram, directed by Tamil filmmaker Dharani was released. It starred Kalyan in the title role and Meera Chopra, Sanusha, Ashutosh Rana, and Mukesh Rishi in supporting roles. Produced by A. M. Rathnam, who had earlier produced Kushi (2001), the story follows Bangaram, a reporter who dreams of working for the BBC. Notably, it was the first time in Kalyan's career that he did not have a female lead opposite him. The film received mixed to negative reviews, and Kalyan reportedly gave refunds to the film's distributors due to its underperformance.

In March 2006, Pawan Kalyan’s second directorial venture, Satyagrahi (tagline: Satyame Naa Ayudham; transl. Truth is my weapon), featuring him in the role of a role of student union leader, was launched with a high-profile event at Annapurna Studios. At the event, Kalyan expressed frustration with societal problems and aimed to use Satyagrahi to highlight these issues in a commercially appealing format. Producer A. M. Rathnam announced that the film would be made in Telugu and Hindi, with a Bengali dub. Despite initial enthusiasm and notable collaborators like P. C. Sreeram and A. R. Rahman, the project was shelved. In October 2021, Kalyan revealed that the film, inspired by Jayaprakash Narayan's Emergency movement, was set aside to focus on real-life activism, finding it more fulfilling to address social issues directly rather than through cinema.

Later that year, he appeared in Annavaram, directed by Bhimaneni Srinivasa Rao, with Asin, and Sandhya were cast alongside him. The film was produced under the Super Good Films banner and marked Kalyan's first role set in a rural background. Pawan Kalyan plays the title role of Annavaram, a blacksmith who, driven by his love for his sister, becomes a vigilante in Hyderabad to dismantle the city's criminal underworld. Released in December 2006, the film was an above-average grosser.

=== 2008–2011: Continued career ===
Kalyan's next film was Jalsa (2008), written and directed by Trivikram Srinivas. Jalsa marks the first collaboration between Pawan Kalyan and Trivikram, a partnership that later extended to multiple projects in the future. Mahesh Babu provided the voiceover for the film. In the film, Pawan Kalyan plays Sanjay Sahu, an aerobics instructor with a troubled past as a Naxalite. Kalyan's performance, especially his comic timing and signature dialogues, played a significant role in the film's success. Jalsa set multiple box office records on its opening day, including the highest first-day collection for a Telugu film and the highest for any South Indian film in a single state. It became the highest-grossing Telugu film of 2008 and was praised for its lead performances, music, humour, and witty dialogues. This marked Kalyan's first success after five consecutive underperforming films.

Pawan Kalyan's next film, Puli (2010), an action thriller, was written and directed by S. J. Surya and produced by Singanamala Ramesh Babu with a budget of ₹40 crore. Initially titled Komaram Puli, the film was renamed Puli on its second day of release due to objections from Komaram Sony Rao, the grandson of tribal legend Komaram Bheem, whose name had inspired the original title. The Nizam distribution rights were sold to Geetha Arts for ₹12 crore, a record-breaking sum at the time. Upon release, Puli was critically panned and ultimately became a box office disaster.

In August 2010, an official announcement was made that Kalyan was going to play a role in a movie about Jesus Christ to be directed by Singeetam Srinivasa Rao. With a production cost of $30 million, it was touted as the most expensive film to be ever made in Indian cinema. The film was set to be shot in Israel and the Palestinian Territories with an all-Indian cast, primarily featuring children. It was reported that the producers spent time touring sites in Jerusalem and around the Sea of Galilee and have approached the Palestinian Authority about filming in Jericho and Bethlehem. Shooting for the film was said to begin in Jerusalem in October 2010 and the film was to be released in 2011. The film was said to include seven devotional songs. It was to be a 195-minute film, with versions in four languages, including English.

In 2011, Pawan Kalyan starred in Teen Maar, directed by Jayanth C. Paranjee with a screenplay by Trivikram Srinivas. It is a remake of the Hindi film Love Aaj Kal (2009). Kalyan plays dual roles: Michael Velayudham, a carefree chef in Italy navigating modern relationships, and Arjun Palwai, whose traditional 1980s love story profoundly influences Michael's journey toward understanding the true value of love and commitment. The film was an average grosser at the box office.

Kalyan's next film was Vishnuvardhan's gangster drama Panjaa (2011). Apart from Kalyan, it starred Sarah-Jane Dias, Anjali Lavania, and Jackie Shroff. Kalyan showcased a new look for Panjaa, combining a well-trimmed beard with his moustache. In the film, Kalyan plays Jai, a loyal hitman for a powerful gangster, who is forced to go on the run after a mission goes wrong. Released in December 2011, Panjaa received mixed reviews from critics. It had a moderate reception from overseas audiences but struggled to make an impact at the domestic box office. Over time, it has been regarded as an underrated film in Telugu cinema.

=== 2012–2013: Comeback with blockbuster hits ===
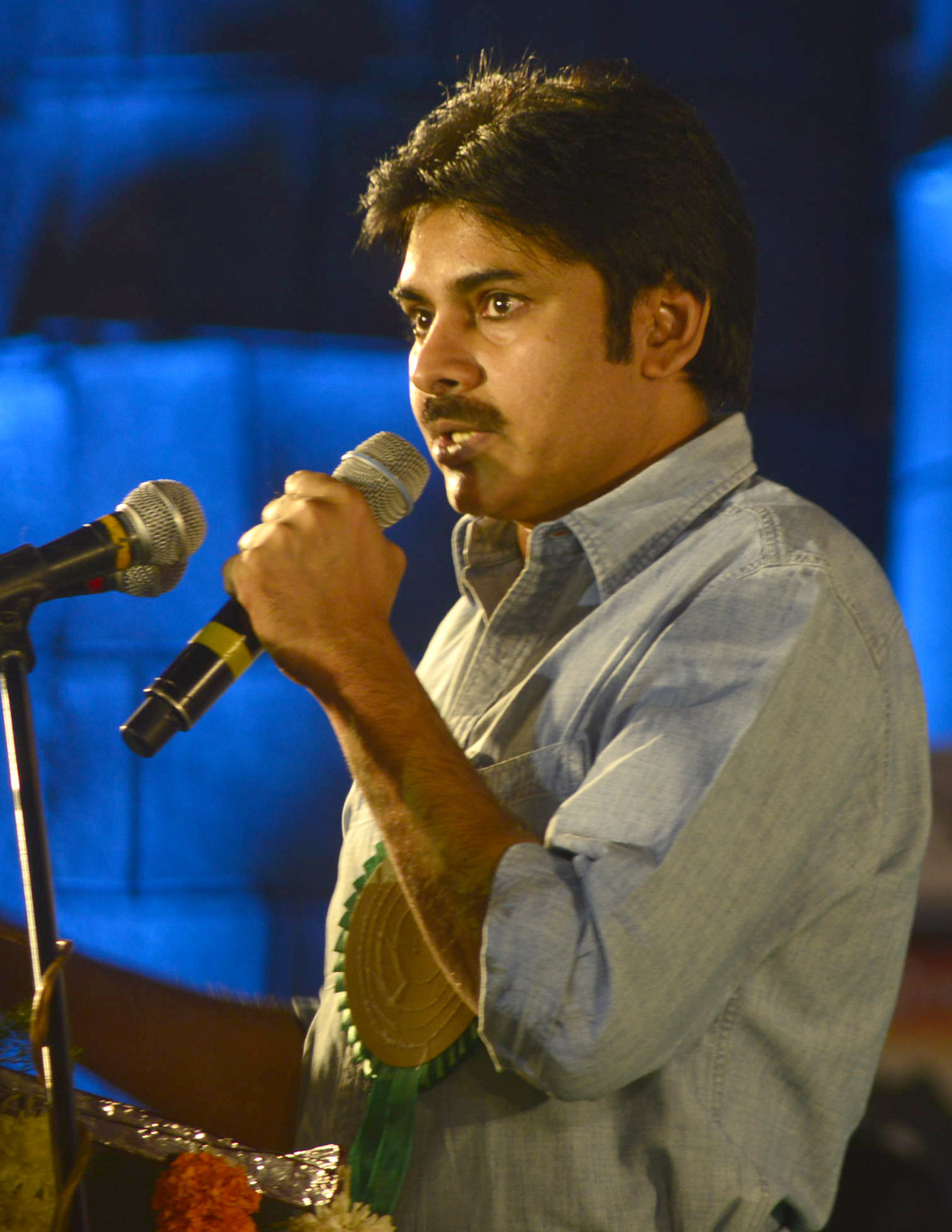
Pawan Kalyan at the 18th International Children’s Film Festival India in Hyderabad on 20 November 2013

In 2012, Pawan Kalyan starred in Gabbar Singh, directed by Harish Shankar. It is a remake of the Hindi hit Dabangg (2010), with changes to the original screenplay and characters. Kalyan played Venkataratnam Naidu, a police officer who takes on the alias Gabbar Singh to combat a local thug's corrupt political schemes. Gabbar Singh set new records for opening day, first weekend, and first week collections in Tollywood, grossing around ₹110 crore worldwide. It became the second-highest-grossing Telugu film at the time surpassing Dookudu (2011), and emerging as the highest-grossing Telugu film of the year. Kalyan's performance was acclaimed for its charisma and energy, blending mass appeal with comedy, earning him the Filmfare Award for Best Actor – Telugu, the SIIMA Award for Best Actor – Telugu, a CineMAA Award, among other accolades.

Later in 2012, Kalyan appeared in Cameraman Gangatho Rambabu, a political action film directed by Puri Jagannadh. Kalyan played Rambabu, a mechanic-turned-journalist who battles a corrupt politician.

In September 2013, Pawan Kalyan starred in Attarintiki Daredi, directed by Trivikram Srinivas. He played Gautham Nanda, a wealthy heir who disguises himself as a driver to reunite his grandfather with his estranged daughter. Despite significant piracy issues before its release, the film became the highest-grossing Telugu film of the time, surpassing Magadheera (2009). It won four Nandi Awards and four Filmfare Awards South. Kalyan's performance earned him the Santosham Best Actor Award, with nominations for both a Filmfare Award and a SIIMA Award. It was remade into Kannada as Ranna (2015), in Bengali as Abhimaan (2016), and in Tamil as Vantha Rajavathaan Varuven (2019).

=== 2014–present: Balancing acting with political career ===
In March 2014, Kalyan founded the Janasena Party and actively campaigned in the 2014 elections. Thereafter, he continued his political career alongside his film career. His first film release after starting Janasena was Gopala Gopala (2015), a Telugu remake of the Hindi film OMG – Oh My God! (2012). The film featured Kalyan starring alongside Venkatesh and was directed by Kishore Kumar Pardasani. It was produced by D. Suresh Babu and Sharrath Marar. Made on a budget of ₹12 crore, the film was released in January 2015 as a Sankranthi release. In the film, Pawan Kalyan plays Lord Krishna in disguise as a common man, Govinda Gopala Hari, to help a devout atheist challenge fraudulent godmen and promote a true understanding of God. It received positive reviews from critics and was commercially successful grossing ₹88.1 crore with a distributor share of ₹41.1 crore.

In 2016, Kalyan starred in Sardaar Gabbar Singh. It was co-written and directed by K. S. Ravindra, based on an original story by Kalyan himself. It was a sequel to his 2012 film Gabbar Singh. The film was released worldwide in April 2016, along with a Hindi dubbed version, on a screen count of 3,200 thus becoming the second biggest Telugu film release after Baahubali: The Beginning (2015). It received mixed reviews from critics.

Katamarayudu (2017), a remake of Tamil film Veeram (2014) marked Kalyan's second collaboration with Kishore Kumar Pardasani. In the film, Pawan Kalyan plays Katamarayudu, a selfless man who prioritises his brothers' well-being over his own and eventually wins the approval of his love interest's father by proving his bravery and commitment. The film received mixed reviews, with the music being widely criticised as a major letdown and one of the weakest albums in Pawan Kalyan's career.

Kalyan's next film Agnyaathavaasi (2018), written and directed by Trivikram Srinivas, was touted as his 25th film. The film stars Kalyan, Aadhi Pinisetty, Keerthy Suresh and Anu Emmanuel in lead roles. In the film, Kalyan plays Abhishikth Bhargav, the eldest son of a powerful businessman who returns to his family’s company from exile to uncover the truth behind his father's death and reclaim his rightful place in the business empire. Upon release, it received negative reviews from both critics and audiences, alike. The film was a box-office bomb.

In August 2017, Pawan Kalyan announced his intention to focus on politics starting October 2017 after completing his film commitments. Following the release of Agnyathavaasi in January 2018, Kalyan officially retired from the film industry to concentrate on his political career with the Janasena Party. During this period, from late 2017 to late 2019, he did not take on any new film projects.

In November 2019, it was announced that Kalyan would star in the Telugu remake of the Hindi film Pink (2016), later titled Vakeel Saab. Produced by Boney Kapoor and Dil Raju, and directed by Venu Sriram with dialogues by Trivikram Srinivas, filming for Vakeel Saab began on 20 January 2020, marking Kalyan's return to cinema after a two-year break following Agnyaathavaasi. The film, which also features Nivetha Thomas, Anjali, Ananya Nagalla, Prakash Raj, and Shruti Haasan, was released in April 2021, making it Kalyan's first film release in three years. Kalyan plays Satyadev, a former lawyer who overcomes personal tragedy and alcoholism to fight for justice and support wronged women. The film grossed ₹137.65 crore worldwide, becoming the second highest-grossing Telugu film of the year.

In 2022, Pawan Kalyan starred in Bheemla Nayak, an action thriller film directed by Saagar K Chandra and written by Trivikram Srinivas. The film stars Pawan Kalyan and Rana Daggubati in lead roles. Kalyan plays Bheemla Nayak, a dedicated police officer known for his strong sense of justice and connection with his community. The film netted ₹37 crore on opening day in India, becoming the best post-pandemic opener in Andhra Pradesh and Telangana. Bheemla Nayak grossed over ₹192 crore worldwide in 20 days.

Kalyan's 2023 release was Bro, in which he starred alongside his nephew Sai Dharam Tej, under the direction of Samuthirakani. Produced by People Media Factory and Zee Studios, it is a remake of the director's own Tamil film Vinodhaya Sitham (2021). In the film, Pawan Kalyan plays Titan, a mysterious figure who represents Time, guiding Mark through a transformative journey to rectify his past and reconcile with his responsibilities before his final departure from Earth. The film received mixed-to-average reviews from critics.

Another film, They Call Him OG, was subsequently announced with Sujeeth as the director and D. V. V. Danayya as producer. It is a gangster film and stars Kalyan, Emraan Hashmi (in his Telugu debut), and Priyanka Mohan in lead roles. The film was officially announced in December 2022 and principal photography commenced in April 2023 in Mumbai. OG was scheduled to release on 27 September 2024, but was postponed due to production delays, eventually releasing on 25 September 2025. Kalyan was reported to receive ₹100 crore for remuneration making him one of the highest paid Indian actors.

Mythri Movie Makers announced Ustaad Bhagat Singh with Kalyan, under the direction of Harish Shankar. The film was announced as Bhavadeeyudu Bhagat Singh on 9 September 2021. It marks the second collaboration of Pawan Kalyan with Harish Shankar after Gabbar Singh. Later in December 2022, the title was changed to Ustaad Bhagat Singh. The film's launch event with a pooja ceremony was held on 11 December 2022 at Ramanaidu Studios with cast and crew. It was released on 19 March 2026

== Political career ==
Pawan Kalyan began his political career in 2008 as the president of Yuvarajyam, the youth wing of the Praja Rajyam Party (PRP), founded by his elder brother Chiranjeevi. During his time with PRP, Kalyan did not contest in elections or hold any constitutional post, though he actively campaigned for the party. His campaign efforts were marred by health issues, including a sunstroke that caused bouts of vomiting during a roadshow in Vizag on 19 April 2009. In 2011, when PRP merged with the Congress Party, Kalyan expressed silent discontent with his brother's decision and took a break from political life. Reports suggested that he wanted his brother to keep the party going despite the setback at the polls.

=== 2014–2019: Formation and growth of Janasena ===
Pawan Kalyan founded the Jana Sena Party on 14 March 2014. He co-authored a book titled Ism, which outlines the party's ideology. On 21 March 2014, Kalyan met Bharatiya Janata Party (BJP) prime ministerial candidate Narendra Modi to discuss issues concerning the Telugu states and extended his support. He chose not to contest in the 2014 elections, instead supporting and campaigning extensively for the Telugu Desam Party (TDP) and BJP alliance. Kalyan campaigned against the Congress party, giving the slogan "Congress Hatao, Desh Bachao" (transl. Remove Congress, Save the Nation). His rallies drew huge crowds in Andhra Pradesh and Telangana, His support and campaigning played a crucial role in the TDP-led National Democratic Alliance's victory in the Andhra Pradesh Assembly elections.

In November 2016, Kalyan announced that JSP will contest in the 2019 general elections in Andhra Pradesh. He stated that he was planning to contest from all 175 legislatures of Andhra Pradesh without any alliance. In August 2017, he announced that he intended to enter full-time politics starting October 2017 once he completes his film commitments.

In 2017, Kalyan brought the Uddanam kidney disease crisis to the attention of media and politicians through protests and a hunger strike. Government of Andhra Pradesh responded by constructing dialysis centres and implementing various schemes for the village. In December 2017, Kalyan opposed central government's move to privatise Dredging Corporation of India (DCI). In July 2018, he opposed the TDP Government's decision on forced land pooling. In October 2018, Kalyan conducted a march on the historical Dowleswaram Barrage in Rajahmundry demanding political accountability. In November 2018, he exposed the alleged unchecked mining in the reserved forest area at Vanthada village of Prathipadu in East Godavari district. In December 2018, he led a protest march to condole the families of farmers who committed suicides or migrated from the drought-prone regions of Rayalaseema.

=== 2019–2024: Setback and resurgence ===
Pawan Kalyan announced the JSP's 2019 election manifesto at a public meeting in Rajahmundry, outlining measures to improve the lives of farmers, farm labourers, women, youth, and students. He announced that his party would contest the 2019 elections in Andhra Pradesh and Telangana in alliance with the Bahujan Samaj Party (BSP), Communist Party of India (CPI), and Communist Party of India (Marxist) (CPM). While actively campaigning across Andhra Pradesh, Kalyan experienced health issues, including dizziness and nausea. He was hospitalised and treated in Vijayawada after experiencing vomiting, dehydration, and drowsiness at Gannavaram Airport. The campaign resumed once he recovered.

Jana Sena Party contested in 140 constituencies in the 2019 Andhra Pradesh Legislative Assembly election, of which, Kalyan contested in two constituencies – Gajuwaka and Bhimavaram. He lost in both constituencies to candidates from YSR Congress Party. His party was able to win from Razole, making it the only seat it won in the election. But the party garnered around 6% vote share.

After the 2019 setback, Kalyan and JSP focused on highlighting issues like farmer welfare, transparent governance, poor infrastructure, illegal sand mining, women's safety, land encroachment etc. On 3 November 2019, Kalyan led a long march in Visakhapatnam in support of construction workers, against YSR Congress Party, who have been facing unemployment due to a shortage of supply of sand in Andhra Pradesh. On 16 January 2020, Kalyan announced his party's alliance with BJP, after three years of distancing from it. On 12 February 2020, he led a rally for justice to Sugali Preethi, a 15-year-old girl who was raped and murdered, in Kurnool. He demanded an inquiry by Central Bureau of Investigation (CBI) into the incident. In late 2022, Kalyan started 'Jana Vani,' a series of small public meetings to hear people's grievances. In 2023, he launched a state-wide yatra in his customised vehicle 'Varahi,' aimed at strengthening the party's connection with the voters.

In the 2024 General and state Assembly elections, Kalyan played a key role in forging an alliance between JSP, TDP and BJP by limiting the number of seats his party contested. The alliance swept to power in a landslide victory, with Jana Sena winning all of the seats it contested — 21 MLA seats and 2 MP seats. Kalyan was elected to the Andhra Pradesh Legislative Assembly from Pithapuram constituency by a margin of over 70,000 votes.

=== 2024–present: Deputy Chief Minister of Andhra Pradesh ===
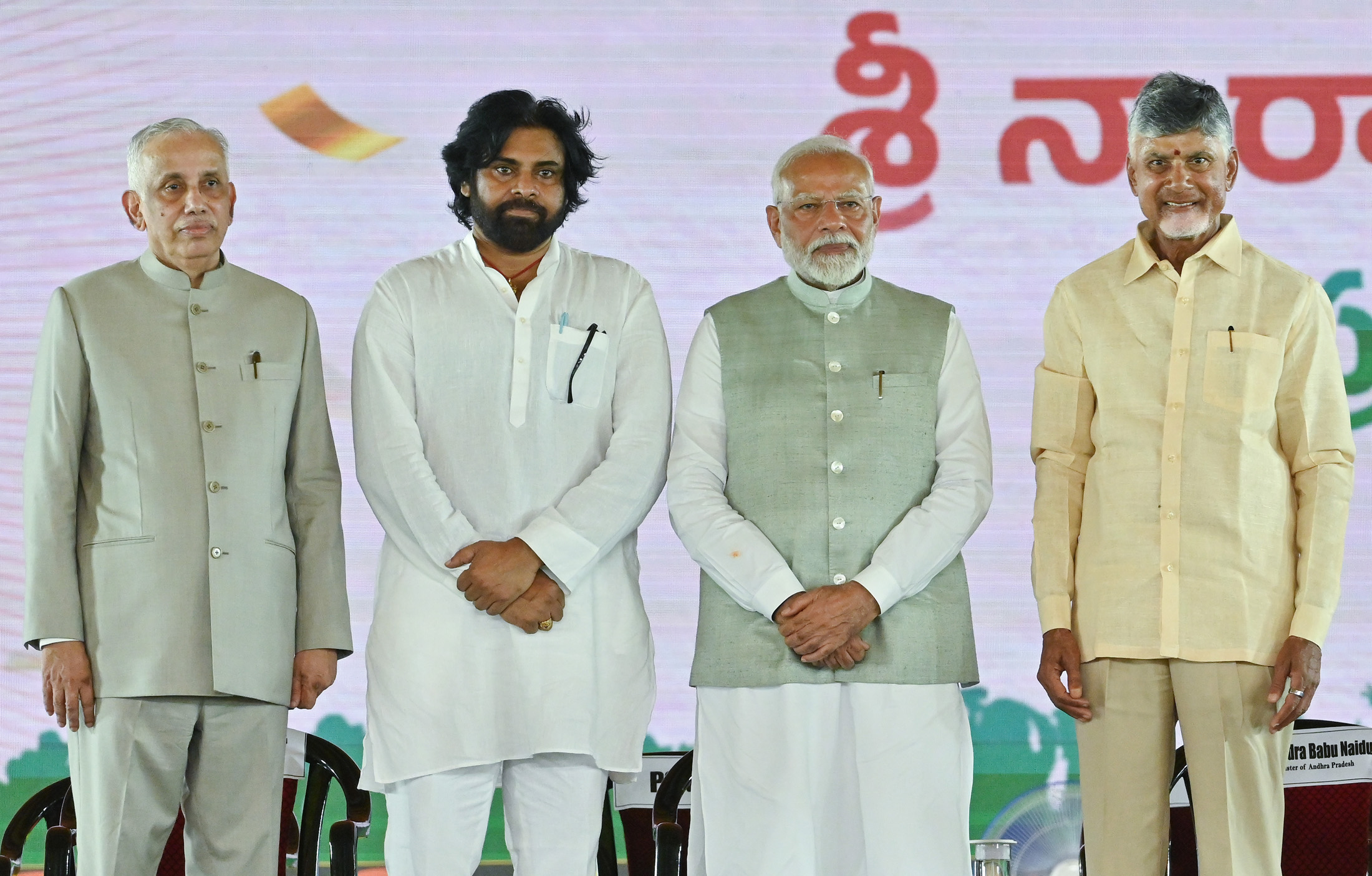
Pawan Kalyan at the swearing-in ceremony of the newly elected Government of Andhra Pradesh

On 12 June 2024, Pawan Kalyan was sworn in as a cabinet minister in the Government of Andhra Pradesh, and on 14 June 2024, he was announced as the deputy chief minister of Andhra Pradesh. He is also the Minister of Panchayat Raj, Rural Development & Rural Water Supply; Environment, Forests, Science & Technology.

In August 2024, under Pawan Kalyan's leadership, the Panchayat Raj and Rural Development Department held Grama Sabhas (village council meetings) in 13,326 villages in one day. This achievement was recognised as a world record by the World Records Union (WRU), and Kalyan received the certificate and medal from WRU as the minister of the department. In October 2024, Kalyan launched the Palle Panduga Panchayat Varotsavalu programme, addressing issues raised during the August Grama Sabhas and overseeing 30,000 development projects across 13,326 Grama Panchayats, with a total allocation of ₹4,500 crore.

In October 2024, Pawan Kalyan directed the Kakinada district collector to inspect schools, hospitals, and sanitation facilities in 52 Gram Panchayats in his Pithapuram constituency, aiming to resolve local issues.

=== Electoral History ===
Year	Constituency	Party	Votes	%	Opponent	Party	Votes	%	Result	Margin	%
2019	Gajuwaka	JSP	58,539	29.37	Tippala Nagireddy	YSRCP	75,292	37.78	Lost	-16,753	-8.41
2019	Bhimavaram	JSP	62,285	32.43	Grandhi Srinivas	YSRCP	70,642	36.78	Lost	-8,357	-4.35
2024	Pithapuram	JSP	134,394	64.87	Vanga Geetha	YSRCP	64,115	30.95	Won	+70,279	+33.92

== Philanthropy ==
Pawan Kalyan has supported various causes including disaster relief, healthcare, education, farmers' welfare, soldiers' welfare, parasports, elderly care, orphan welfare, arts, literature, and temples. In 2017, he was chosen for the Indo-European Business Forum's Excellence Award.

He has contributed to relief efforts for events such as the Kargil War, the COVID-19 pandemic, and natural disasters including floods and cyclones in Andhra Pradesh and Telangana. In 2007, he founded the charity Common Man Protection Force by donating an initial fund of ₹1 crore. Kalyan has also supported sports and community programs such as a sports ground for the Mysuravaripalli government school in the Railway Koduru constituency of Annamayya district. In October 2024, Kalyan donated ₹10 lakh, offering ₹1 lakh to each family affected by the water contamination incident in Gurla village, Vizianagaram district. Pawan Kalyan also donated ₹5 crore for farmers' welfare.

== Other works ==
In April 2001, Pepsi, announced Pawan Kalyan as its brand ambassador, making him the first South Indian to endorse the soft-drink., In January 2017, Kalyan agreed to take up the role of brand ambassador for handloom weavers in Andhra Pradesh and Telangana., In August 2017, Kalyan was appointed the brand ambassador to Jeevandan, an initiative started for organ donation by the government of Andhra Pradesh.

Kalyan was invited to Harvard University to deliver a speech at the 14th edition of India Conference 2017 along with R. Madhavan.

== Personal life ==
Pawan Kalyan is the younger brother of actors Chiranjeevi and Nagendra Babu, and the uncle of actors Ram Charan, Allu Arjun, Varun Tej, Niharika Konidela, Sai Durgha Tej, and Panja Vaisshnav Tej.

Kalyan married Nandini in May 1997, but they separated by 1999. In 2001, Kalyan began a relationship with Renu Desai, and they married in January 2009 in a ceremony conducted according to Arya Samaj rites at his residence in Jubilee Hills. They have a son and a daughter together. The couple divorced in 2012. Renu later stated that they parted ways for personal reasons but still maintain a friendly relationship.

Kalyan married Anna Lezhneva, a Russian citizen, in September 2013 under the Special Marriage Act at a Sub-Registrar Office in Hyderabad. The couple has a daughter and a son. The couple divorced in 2026. Outside of his career, Kalyan holds a black belt in Karate and is an avid reader.

== Awards and nominations ==
Year	Award	Category	Film	Result	Ref.
1999	47th Filmfare Awards South	Best Actor – Telugu	Thammudu	Nominated	
2001	49th Filmfare Awards South	Best Actor – Telugu	Kushi	Nominated	
2008	56th Filmfare Awards South	Best Actor – Telugu	Jalsa	Nominated	
2012	60th Filmfare Awards South	Best Actor – Telugu	Gabbar Singh	Won	
2012	Hyderabad Times Film Awards	Best Actor	Gabbar Singh	Won	
2012	CineMAA Awards	Best Actor – Male	Gabbar Singh	Won	
2012	South Indian International Movie Awards	Best Actor – Telugu	Gabbar Singh	Won	
2013	61st Filmfare Awards South	Best Actor – Telugu	Attarintiki Daredi	Nominated	
2013	Santosham Film Awards	Best Actor	Attarintiki Daredi	Won	
2013	Margadarsi Big Telugu Entertainment Awards	Best Actor	Attarintiki Daredi	Won	
2013	South Indian International Movie Awards	Best Actor – Telugu	Attarintiki Daredi	Nominated	
2015	1st IIFA Utsavam	Best Supporting Actor – Telugu	Gopala Gopala	Nominated	
2026	South Indian International Movie Awards	Best Actor – Telugu	They Call Him OG	Nominated	
