= Prathipadu, Kakinada district =

Prathipadu
- Mandal
- Interactive map of Prathipadu
- Location in Andhra Pradesh, India Prathipadu (India)
- Coordinates: 17.2333°N 82.2000°E
- State: Andhra Pradesh
- District: Kakinada

Languages
  - Official: Telugu
- Time zone: UTC+5:30 (IST)
- PIN: 533432
- Telephone code: 08868
- Vehicle Registration: AP05 (Former); AP39 (from 30 January 2019)

Prathipadu mandal is one of the constituency and a mandal in the Kakinada district of the Indian state of Andhra Pradesh. It is located in Kakinada district.

== Geography ==
Prattipadu is located at 17.2333°N 82.2000°E. It has an average elevation of 29 meters (98 feet).
