= List of leaders of the opposition in the Andhra Pradesh Legislative Assembly =

Leader of Opposition

Leader of the Opposition in the Andhra Pradesh Legislative Assembly
- Emblem of Andhra Pradesh
- Incumbent; Vacant since 12 June 2024
- Andhra Pradesh Legislative Assembly
- Style: The Honourable
- Status: Head of the opposition
- Member of: Andhra Pradesh Legislative Assembly
- Nominator: Members of the Official Opposition in the Assembly
- Appointer: Speaker of the Andhra Pradesh Legislative Assembly
- Inaugural holder: Puchalapalli Sundarayya
- Formation: 1 November 1956; 69 years ago
- Website: www.aplegislature.org

The leader of the opposition in the Andhra Pradesh Legislative Assembly is the official leader of the principal opposition party in Andhra Pradesh Legislative Assembly. The leader of opposition is given rank of cabinet minister and is entitled to draw monthly salary and other perks of the same rank.

== History ==
Location of the Andhra State (1953–1956) on the map of India.

The Andhra State, a precursor to the modern state of Andhra Pradesh, was established on 1 November 1956 following the Andhra movement. The formation of Andhra State was made possible by the Andhra State Act, which was passed in the Parliament of India in September 1953. This significant development was ignited by a determined fast led by Potti Sreeramulu, whose sacrifice ultimately catalyzed the demand for a new linguistic state.

The newly created Andhra State included 11 districts in the Telugu-speaking region of the Madras State, with Kurnool as its capital and a unicameral parliamentary system with a Legislative Assembly chamber.

Location of the Andhra Pradesh (1956–2014) on the map of India.

The Andhra Pradesh, colloquially referred to as United Andhra Pradesh, was officially established on 1 November 1956, through the enactment of the States Reorganisation Act in August 1956. This led to the dissolution of Hyderabad State, with its divisions becoming part of Mysore State and Bombay State. Concurrently, the integration of Telugu-speaking regions into Andhra State laid the foundation for the vibrant state of Andhra Pradesh with a bicameral parliamentary system consisting of Legislative Council and Legislative Assembly chambers.

Originally situated in Hyderabad, the capital later moved to Amaravati in 2017 following the implementation of the Andhra Pradesh Reorganisation Act, which led to the formation of Telangana on 2 June 2014 and a reduction in the assembly constituencies from 294 to 175. Despite these significant boundary changes, the state continued to be recognised as Andhra Pradesh.

Location of the Andhra Pradesh (since 2014) on the map of India.

After the state reorganisation in 2014, Y. S. Jagan Mohan Reddy of YSR Congress party became the first leader of opposition in Andhra Pradesh Legislative Assembly followed by N. Chandrababu Naidu of Telugu Desam Party from 2019 to 2024.

N. Chandrababu Naidu is the longest serving leader of opposition. He served as leader of opposition from 2004 to 2014, making him the last leader of opposition before the state bifurcation.

== Eligibility ==
Official opposition is a term used in Andhra Pradesh Legislative Assembly to designate the political party which has secured the second largest number of seats in the assembly. In order to get formal recognition, the party must have at least 25 of the total membership of the Legislative Assembly. A single party has to meet the 10% seat criterion, not an alliance. Many of the Indian state legislatures also follow this 10% rule while the rest of them prefer single largest opposition party according to the rules of their respective houses. But according to section 12B of payment of salaries, allowances, prevention of disqualification of MLAs in AP legislative assembly act, 10% of MLA's not required to be recognised as Leader of opposition or official opposition party. The opposition party having a greater number of MLA's is recognised as official opposition or principal opposition party and the MLA's elect their leader is Leader of opposition in Andhra Pradesh legislative assembly.

== Role ==
The opposition's main role is to question the government of the day and hold them accountable to the public. The opposition is equally responsible in upholding the best interests of the people of the country. They have to ensure that the Government does not take any steps, which might have negative effects on the people of the country.

The role of the opposition in legislature is basically to check the excesses of the ruling or dominant party, and not to be totally antagonistic. There are actions of the ruling party which may be beneficial to the masses and opposition is expected to support such steps.

In legislature, opposition party has a major role and must act to discourage the party in power from acting against the interests of the country and the common man. They are expected to alert the population and the Government on the content of any bill, which is not in the best interests of the country.

== List of leaders of the opposition ==
=== Since 1956 ===
Until the Sixth Legislative Assembly no political party was recognized as an Official Opposition Party. In the Sixth Legislative Assembly the Janata Party was recognized as Opposition Party Officially as it has got Sixty (60) Members. As per the Rules of the House, an Opposition Party should get minimum seats of ‘one-tenth' of the total strength of the Assembly for its Official recognition.

(*) These leaders have been recognized officially as Leaders of Opposition in the Legislative Assembly

#	Portrait	Leader of the opposition (Lifespan) Constituency	Term of the office			Election (Assembly)	Party	Chief Minister	Appointed by (Speaker)
#	Portrait	Leader of the opposition (Lifespan) Constituency	Term start	Term end	Duration	Election (Assembly)	Party	Chief Minister	Appointed by (Speaker)
1		Puchalapalli Sundarayya (1913–1985); MLA for Gannavaram	1956	1957	1 year	1955 (1st)	Communist Party of India	Neelam Sanjiva Reddy	Ayyadevara Kaleswara Rao
1		Puchalapalli Sundarayya (1913–1985); MLA for Gannavaram	1957	1962	5 years	1957 (2nd)	Communist Party of India	Neelam Sanjiva Reddy Damodaram Sanjivayya	Ayyadevara Kaleswara Rao
2		Tarimela Nagi Reddy (1917–1976); MLA for Puttur	1962	1964	2 years	1962 (3rd)	Communist Party of India	Neelam Sanjiva Reddy	B. V. Subba Reddy
3		Pillalamarri Venkateswarlu MLA for Nandigama	1964	1967	3 years	1962 (3rd)	Communist Party of India	Kasu Brahmananda Reddy	B. V. Subba Reddy
4		Gouthu Latchanna (1917–1976); MLA for Sompeta	1967	1969	2 years	1967 (4th)	Swatantra Party	Kasu Brahmananda Reddy	B. V. Subba Reddy
5		Nukala Ramachandra Reddy (1919–1974); MLA for Dornakal	1969	1971	2 years	1967 (4th)	Telangana United Front	Kasu Brahmananda Reddy	B. V. Subba Reddy
6		Vemulapalli Srikrishna (1917–2000); MLA for Mangalagiri	1972	1977	5 years	1972 (5th)	Communist Party of India	Pamulaparthi Venkata Narasimha Rao Jalagam Vengala Rao	Pidatala Ranga Reddy
7		Erasu Ayyapu Reddy (1924–2009); MLA for Panyam	1977	1978	1 year	1972 (5th)	Communist Party of India	Jalagam Vengala Rao	Pidatala Ranga Reddy
(4)		*Gouthu Latchanna (1909–2006); MLA for Sompeta	31 March 1978	1980	2 years	1978 (6th)	Janata Party	Marri Chenna Reddy T. Anjaiah Bhavanam Venkatarami Reddy Kotla Vijaya Bhaskara Reddy	Divi Kondaiah Chowdary
8		*Ananthula Madan Mohan (1931–2004); MLA for Siddipet	19 January 1983	23 November 1984	1 year, 309 days	1983 (7th)	Indian National Congress	Nandamuri Taraka Rama Rao Nadendla Bhaskara Rao Nandamuri Taraka Rama Rao	Tangi Satyanarayana
9		*Mogaligundla Baga Reddy (1930–2004); MLA for Zahirabad	14 March 1985	28 November 1989	4 years, 259 days	1985 (8th)	Indian National Congress	Nandamuri Taraka Rama Rao	G. Narayana Rao
10		*Nandamuri Taraka Rama Rao (1923–1996); MLA for Hindupur	5 January 1990	10 December 1994	4 years, 339 days	1989 (9th)	Telugu Desam Party	Marri Chenna Reddy Nedurumalli Janardhana Reddy Kotla Vijaya Bhaskara Reddy	P. Ramachandra Reddy
11		Paripati Janardhan Reddy (1948–2007); MLA for Khairatabad	24 March 1995	9 October 1999	4 years, 199 days	1994 (10th)	Indian National Congress	Nandamuri Taraka Rama Rao Nara Chandrababu Naidu	Yanamala Rama Krishnudu
12		*Yeduguri Sandinti Rajasekhara Reddy (1949–2009); MLA for Pulivendla	12 November 1999	14 November 2003	4 years, 2 days	1999 (11th)	Indian National Congress	Nara Chandrababu Naidu	K. Prathibha Bharathi
13		*Nara Chandrababu Naidu (born 1950); MLA for Kuppam	2 June 2004	19 May 2009	4 years, 351 days	2004 (12th)	Telugu Desam Party	Yeduguri Sandinti Rajasekhara Reddy	K. R. Suresh Reddy
13		*Nara Chandrababu Naidu (born 1950); MLA for Kuppam	19 May 2009	28 April 2014	4 years, 344 days	2009 (13th)	Telugu Desam Party	Yeduguri Sandinti Rajasekhara Reddy, Konijeti Rosaiah, Nallari Kiran Kumar Reddy	Kiran Kumar Reddy, Nadendla Manohar
President's rule imposed during the period (1 March 2014 – 7 June 2014) (Note: After 58 years, the state was bifurcated into Andhra Pradesh and Telangana states on 2 June 2014 by Andhra Pradesh Reorganisation Act, 2014. After state reorganisation, Andhra Pradesh Sasana sabha seats come down from 294 to 175 seats.)
14		*Yeduguri Sandinti Jagan Mohan Reddy (born 1972); MLA for Pulivendla	20 June 2014	23 May 2019	4 years, 337 days	2014 (14th)	YSR Congress Party	Nara Chandrababu Naidu	Kodela Siva Prasada Rao
(13)		*Nara Chandrababu Naidu (born 1950); MLA for Kuppam	13 June 2019	5 June 2024	4 years, 358 days	2019 (15th)	Telugu Desam Party	Yeduguri Sandinti Jagan Mohan Reddy	Thammineni Seetharam
–	Vacant since 12 June 2024					2024 (16th)	–	Nara Chandrababu Naidu	Chintakayala Ayyanna Patrudu
