= 1978 Andhra Pradesh Legislative Assembly election =

- 25 February 1978

All 294 seats in the Andhra Pradesh Legislative Assembly 148 seats needed for a majority
- Registered: 28,386,334
- Turnout: 20,698,706 (72.92%) ▲13.21%
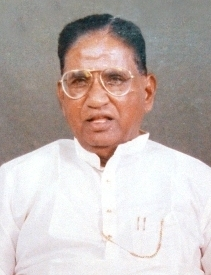

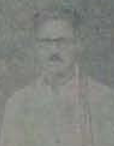

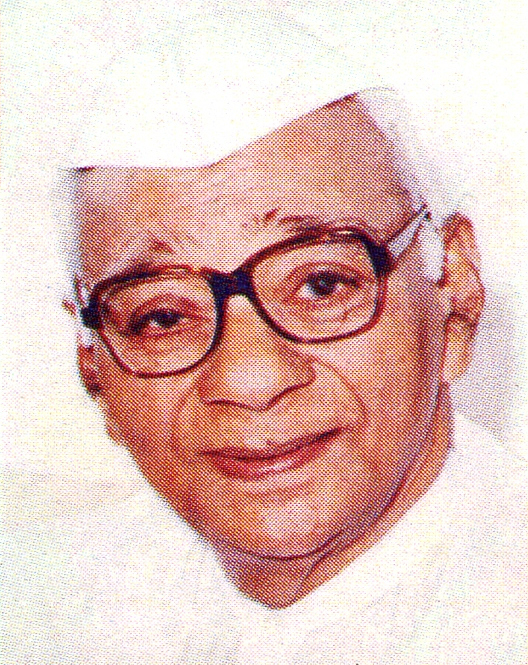
	Majority party	Minority party	Third party
Leader	Marri Chenna Reddy	Gouthu Latchanna	Kasu Brahmananda Reddy
Party	INC(I)	JP	INC(R)
Leader since	1978	1977	1977
Leader's seat	Medchal (won)	Sompeta (won)	Did not contest (Note: Reddy was the sitting MP for Narasaraopet)
Last election	Party did not exist	Party did not exist	219 seats, 52.29%
Seats won	175	60	30
Seat change	New party	New party	▼189
Popular vote	7,908,220	5,812,532	3,426,850
Percentage	39.25%	28.85%	17.05%
Swing	New party	New party	▼35.24%
- 1978 Andhra Pradesh Legislative Assembly election results
Chief Minister before election
Jalagam Vengala Rao
INC(R)
Chief Minister after election
Marri Chenna Reddy
INC(I)

The 1978 Andhra Pradesh Legislative Assembly election was held in 1978. It was the sixth election. Indira Gandhi formed new party INC(I). Indian National Congress (I) won 175 seats out of 294 seats. While, JP won 60 seats and Independent candidates won 15 seats.

== Parties and alliances ==
Alliance/Party	Flag	Symbol	Leader	Seats contested
Indian National Congress (Requisitionists)			Kasu Brahmananda Reddy	257
Indian National Congress (Indira)			Marri Chenna Reddy	290
Janata Party			Gouthu Latchanna	270
Communist Party of India (Marxist)			Puchalapalli Sundarayya	22
Communist Party of India				31

== Results ==
=== Vote share ===
Vote share by party
1. Indian National Congress (Indira) (39.2%)
2. Janata Party (28.9%)
3. Indian National Congress (Requisitionists) (17.0%)
4. Communist Party of India (Marxist) (2.71%)
5. Communist Party of India (2.49%)
6. Others (9.70%)

=== Seat share ===
Seat share by party
1. Indian National Congress (Indira) (59.5%)
2. Janata Party (20.4%)
3. Indian National Congress (Requisitionists) (10.2%)
4. Communist Party of India (Marxist) (2.72%)
5. Communist Party of India (2.04%)
6. Others (5.10%)

=== Results by party ===
Party	Popular vote			Seats		
Party	Votes	%	±pp	Contested	Won	+/−
Indian National Congress (Indira)	7,908,220	39.25	new	290	175	new
Janata Party	5,812,532	28.85	new	270	60	new
Indian National Congress (Requisitionists)	3,426,850	17.01	▼189	257	30	▼35.24
Communist Party of India (Marxist)	546,262	2.71	▼0.47	22	8	▲7
Communist Party of India	501,452	2.49	▼3.49	31	6	▼1
Other parties	101,969	0.50	N/A	28	0	N/A
Independents	1,852,808	9.20	▼23.02	640	15	▼42
Total	20,150,093	100.00	N/A	1,538	294	N/A
Vote statistics
Valid votes	20,150,093	97.35				
Invalid votes	548,613	2.65				
Votes cast/ turnout	20,698,706	72.92				
Abstentions	7,687,628	27.08				
Registered voters	28,386,334					

=== Results by district ===
District	Seats						
District	Seats	INC(I)	JNP	INC(R)	CPI	CPM	OTH
Srikakulam	12	1	8	2	—N/a	—N/a	1
Vizianagaram	12	3	5	3	1	—N/a	—N/a
Visakhapatnam	13	5	3	3	1	—N/a	1
East Godavari	21	12	6	2	—N/a	—N/a	1
West Godavari	16	16	—N/a	—N/a	—N/a	—N/a	—N/a
Krishna	17	10	4	—N/a	—N/a	2	1
Guntur	19	10	4	1	—N/a	1	1
Prakasam	13	9	2	—N/a	1	—N/a	—N/a
Nellore	11	10	1	—N/a	—N/a	—N/a	—N/a
Chittoor	15	11	4	—N/a	—N/a	—N/a	—N/a
Kadapa	11	3	4	3	2	—N/a	2
Anantapur	14	12	2	—N/a	—N/a	—N/a	—N/a
Kurnool	13	9	3	1	—N/a	—N/a	1
Mahbubnagar	13	8	3	1	—N/a	—N/a	1
Ranga Reddy	6	5	1	—N/a	—N/a	—N/a	—N/a
Hyderabad	13	4	5	—N/a	—N/a	—N/a	4
Medak	10	7	—N/a	1	1	—N/a	1
Nizamabad	9	9	—N/a	—N/a	—N/a	—N/a	—N/a
Adilabad	9	6	1	—N/a	—N/a	—N/a	1
Karimnagar	13	8	1	1	2	—N/a	1
Warangal	13	7	2	—N/a	—N/a	1	—N/a
Khammam	9	4	1	2	—N/a	1	1
Nalgonda	12	7	1	1	—N/a	3	—N/a
Total	294	175	60	30	6	8	16

=== Results by constituency ===
District	Constituency		Winner				Runner Up				Margin
District	No.	Name	Candidate	Party	Votes	%	Candidate	Party	Votes	%	Margin
Srikakulam	1	Ichchapuram	Bendalam Venkatesam Sarma	JP	34,251	56.11	Labala Sundara Rao	INC(I)	19,805	32.45	14,446
Srikakulam	2	Sompeta	Gouthu Latchanna	JP	42,251	57.72	Majji Tulasi Das	INC(I)	28,251	38.60	14,000
Srikakulam	3	Tekkali	Bammaidi Narayanaswami	JP	36,206	54.28	Satharu Lakanadham Naidu	INC(R)	22,502	33.73	13,704
Srikakulam	4	Harishchandrapuram	Kannepalli Appalanarasimha Bhukta	INC(R)	26,381	43.06	Kinjarapu Krishna Murti	JP	24,070	39.29	2,311
Srikakulam	5	Narasannapeta	Dola Seetaramulu	INC(I)	28,123	43.56	Simma Jagannadham	JP	22,397	34.69	5,726
Srikakulam	6	Pathapatnam	Kalamata Mohanarao	IND	19,935	32.35	Lukulapu Lakshmanadas	JP	19,111	31.02	824
Srikakulam	7	Kothuru	Viswasarai Narasimharao	JP	25,317	44.67	Nimmaka Gopala Rao	INC(I)	21,724	38.33	3,593
Vizianagaram	8	Naguru (ST)	Satrucharla Vijaya Rama Raju	JP	19,781	39.03	Chandra Chudanami Dev Vyricherla	INC(R)	18,248	36.01	1,533
Vizianagaram	9	Parvathipuram	Parasuramnaidu Chikati	JP	32,494	50.78	Krishnamurthy Naidu Vasireddi	INC(R)	17,671	27.61	14,823
Vizianagaram	10	Salur (ST)	S.R.T.P.S.Veerapa Raju	CPI	29,126	54.34	Lakshmi Narasimha Sahyasi Raju	JP	24,477	45.66	4,649
Vizianagaram	11	Bobbili	Kolli Venkata Kurmi Naidu	JP	29,184	42.14	Reddy Satya Rao	IND	15,707	22.68	13,477
Vizianagaram	12	Therlam	Vasireddi Varada Ramarao	INC(R)	29,024	38.06	Tentu Lakshunnaidu	JP	26,735	35.06	2,289
Srikakulam	13	Vunukuru	Babu Parankusam Mudili	JP	26,617	36.28	Palavalasa Rimkinamma	INC(R)	20,030	27.30	6,587
Srikakulam	14	Palakonda (SC)	Kambala Rajaratnam	JP	24,145	45.05	Daramana Adinarayana	INC(I)	12,387	23.11	11,758
Srikakulam	15	Amadalavalasa	Srinamamurthy Pydi	INC(R)	21,750	34.61	Venkatappalanaidu Peerukatla	INC(I)	18,375	29.24	3,375
Srikakulam	16	Srikakulam	Challa Lakshminarayana	JP	23,643	33.32	Raghavadas Tripurna	INC(I)	16,556	23.33	7,087
Srikakulam	17	Etcherla (SC)	Kothapalli Narasayya	JP	25,272	46.82	Boddepalli Narasimhulu	INC(I)	15,481	28.68	9,791
Vizianagaram	18	Cheepurupalli	Chigilipalli Syamalarao	INC(I)	27,943	41.46	Akkalanaidu Tankala	IND	17,034	25.28	10,929
Vizianagaram	19	Gajapathinagaram	Vangapandu Narayanappala Naidu	JP	27,091	37.11	Venkata Gangaraju Narkedamilli	IND	23,945	32.80	3,146
Vizianagaram	20	Vizianagaram	Ashok Gajapathi Raju	JP	39,914	59.67	Appasani Appanadora	INC(R)	13,829	20.67	26,085
Vizianagaram	21	Sathivada	Penumatsa Sambasiva Raju	INC(R)	35,935	51.76	Byreddi Surya Narayana	JP	13,853	19.95	22,082
Vizianagaram	22	Bhogapuram	Appadudora Kommuru	INC(R)	30,716	51.89	Pathivada Narayanaswamy Naidu	JP	19,275	32.56	11,441
Visakhapatnam	23	Bheemunipatnam	Datla Jagannadha Raju	INC(I)	34,758	52.74	Devi Kumara Soma Sundra Suryanarayana Raju Raja Sagi	INC(R)	13,403	20.34	21,355
Visakhapatnam	24	Visakhapatnam-I	Sunkari Alwar Das	INC(I)	23,811	45.29	Sylada Pudithalli Naidu	JP	21,389	40.68	2,422
Visakhapatnam	25	Visakhapatnam-II	N.S.N.Reddy	JP	34,070	46.91	Ch.Sesibhusana Rao	INC(I)	22,503	30.98	11,567
Visakhapatnam	26	Pendurthi	Gudivada Appanna	INC(I)	28,895	41.45	Sabbella Gangadhara Reddy	CPI(M)	18,848	27.04	10,047
Vizianagaram	27	Uttarapalli	K. V. R. S. Padmanabha Raju	INC(I)	23,657	34.32	Boddu Suryanarayana Murty	INC(R)	22,074	32.02	1,583
Vizianagaram	28	Srungavarapukota (ST)	Sanyasidora Duru	INC(I)	21,927	36.60	Balaraju Pujari	IND	16,564	27.65	5,363
Visakhapatnam	29	Paderu (ST)	Giddi Appalanaidu	JP	12,653	50.68	Tammarba Chitti Naidu	INC(R)	10,146	40.64	2,507
Visakhapatnam	30	Madugula	Kuracha Ramunaidu	IND	19,147	28.03	Gummala Adinarayana	INC(I)	18,710	27.39	437
Visakhapatnam	31	Chodavaram	Seetharama Sastri Emani	JP	40,690	50.57	Palayalli Vechalapu	INC(R)	28,624	35.58	12,006
Visakhapatnam	32	Anakapalli	Koduganti Govindrao	CPI	28,382	41.72	Pappala Chalapathirao	JP	19,945	29.32	8,437
Visakhapatnam	33	Paravada	Bhattam Sri Ramamurthy	INC(R)	31,498	48.32	Paila Appalanaidu	JP	18,006	27.62	13,492
Visakhapatnam	34	Elamanchili	Veesam Sanyasi Naidu	INC(I)	37,969	52.45	Nagireddi Satyanarayana	JP	29,302	40.48	8,667
Visakhapatnam	35	Payakaraopet (SC)	Maruthi Adeyya	INC(I)	29,490	58.66	Gara China Nookaraju	INC(R)	14,023	27.89	15,467
Visakhapatnam	36	Narsipatnam	Gopatrudu Bolem	INC(R)	40,209	52.35	Sagi Sri Raja Suryanarayana Raju	JP	31,649	41.21	8,560
Visakhapatnam	37	Chintapalle (ST)	Depuru Kondal Rao	INC(R)	18,363	39.97	Kannalu Lokula	INC(I)	14,707	32.01	3,656
East Godavari	38	Yellavaram (ST)	Gorrela Prakash Rao	INC(I)	23,345	56.07	Tadapatla Ratnabai	JP	9,151	21.98	14,194
East Godavari	39	Burugupudi	Padma Raju Varrey	INC(I)	25,124	30.79	Pendurti Sambasiva Rao	JP	22,217	27.23	2,907
East Godavari	40	Rajahmundry	Tadavarthi Satyavathi	INC(I)	35,079	46.92	Chitturi Prabhakara Chowdary	CPI	19,647	26.28	15,432
East Godavari	41	Kadiam	Ammiraju Patamsetti	JP	30,887	37.32	P.S.Rao	INC(I)	30,300	36.61	587
East Godavari	42	Jaggampeta	Pantham Padmnabham	INC(I)	40,566	52.17	Vaddi Mutyalarao	JP	30.683	39.46	9,883
East Godavari	43	Peddapuram	Vundavalli Narayanamurthy	INC(I)	43,595	58.18	Yeleti Dhanayya	JP	23,375	31.20	20,220
East Godavari	44	Prathipadu (East Godavari)	Mudragada Padmanabham	JP	32,614	40.23	Appalaraju Varupula	INC(I)	22,352	27.57	10,262
East Godavari	45	Tuni	M. N. Vijayalakshmi Devi	INC(R)	37,219	48.94	Kongara Venkata Satya Prasad	INC(I)	26,567	34.94	10,562
East Godavari	46	Pithapuram	Koppana Venkata Chandra Mohanarao	INC(I)	28,585	44.03	Peketi Thammiraju	JP	23,685	36.48	4,900
East Godavari	47	Sampara	Venkatramana Matta	INC(I)	36,120	46.61	Madadha John Apparao	JP	20,233	26.11	15,887
East Godavari	48	Kakinada	Malladi Swamy	INC(I)	37,258	49.38	Katha Janardhana Rao	JP	25,502	33.80	11,756
East Godavari	49	Tallarevu	Suryanarayana Biruda	JP	33,021	45.02	Sathiraju Sadanala	INC(I)	24,415	33.29	8,606
East Godavari	50	Anaparthy	Padala Ammireddy	JP	37,261	49.54	Undavilli Satyanarayana Murty	INC(R)	22,982	30.56	14,279
East Godavari	51	Ramachandrapuram	Apparao Pilli	IND	19,306	25.53	Mudragada Venkastaswamy Naidu	JP	19,045	25.19	261
East Godavari	52	Alamuru	Sangita Venkatareddy	INC(I)	42,372	49.23	S.B.P.B.K.Satyanarayana Rao	JP	35,835	41.63	6,537
East Godavari	53	Mummidivaram (SC)	Moka Sri Vishnuprasada Rao	INC(I)	37,919	51.99	Appalaswamy Bojja	JP	24,691	33.85	13,228
East Godavari	54	Allavaram (SC)	Venkatapathi Devarapalli	INC(I)	29,811	48.59	B.V.Ramanayya	RPI(K)	21,242	34.63	8,569
East Godavari	55	Amalapuram	Venkata Sri Rama Rao Palacholla	JP	25,900	35.73	Nageswara Rao Dommety	INC(I)	23,492	32.41	2,408
East Godavari	56	Kothapeta	Manthena Venkata Surya Subharaju	JP	31,679	43.02	Chirla Soma Sundara Reddy	INC(R)	28,110	38.18	3,569
East Godavari	57	Nagaram (SC)	Neethipudi Ganapathi Rao	INC(I)	35,891	51.50	S. Pemulu	JP	21,387	30.69	14,504
East Godavari	58	Razole	Rudraraju Ramalingaraju	INC(R)	37,992	51.70	Sayyaparaju Seetharamaraju	INC(I)	17,652	24.02	20,340
West Godavari	59	Narasapuram	Sheshavataram Parakala	INC(I)	36,767	46.19	Polisetti Vasudeva Rao	JP	24,933	31.32	11,834
West Godavari	60	Palacole	Vardhineedi Satyanarayana	INC(I)	32,736	46.96	Chodisetti Suryarao	INC(R)	19,699	28.24	13,063
West Godavari	61	Achanta (SC)	Kota Dhanaraju	INC(I)	39,504	54.37	Didupatti Sundrara Raju	CPI(M)	21,622	29.78	17,882
West Godavari	62	Bhimavaram	Kalidindi Vijayayanarasimha Raju	INC(I)	41,295	51.30	Mentay Padamanabham	JP	26,065	32.38	15,230
West Godavari	63	Undi	Gottamukkala Ramachandra Raju	INC(I)	35,560	44.02	Yerra Narayana Swamy (Benerji)	INC(R)	23,354	28.91	12,206
West Godavari	64	Penugonda	Jakkamsetti Venkateswararao	INC(I)	33,971	47.53	Vanka Satyanarayana	CPI	26,549	37.14	7,422
West Godavari	65	Tanuku	Kantioydu Appa Rao	INC(I)	35,393	45.30	Gannamani Satyanarayana Murty	INC(R)	21,331	27.30	14,062
West Godavari	66	Attili	Indukuri Ramakrishnamraju	INC(I)	32,541	41.08	Vegesna Kanaka Durga Venkata Satyanarayanaraju	INC(R)	23,637	29.84	8,904
West Godavari	67	Tadepalligudem	Chintalapati Seeta Rama Chandra Vara Prasada Murty Raju	INC(I)	39,128	47.38	Eli Anjaneyulu	INC(R)	31,455	38.09	7,673
West Godavari	68	Ungutur	Kadiyala Satyanarayana	INC(I)	41,547	51.49	Maganti Bhupati Rao	JP	25,175	31.20	16,372
West Godavari	69	Dendulur	Neelam Charles	INC(I)	36,865	52.37	Garapati Sambasiva Rao	JP	28,965	41.14	7,900
West Godavari	70	Eluru	Surya Prakasa Rao Nalabati	INC(I)	34,825	45.30	Amanaganti Sreeramulu	JP	24,113	31.36	10,712
West Godavari	71	Gopalpuram (SC)	Dasari Sarojini Devi	INC(I)	39,225	55.65	Sati Venkatrao	JP	17,746	25.18	10,712
West Godavari	72	Kovvur	Munshi Abdul Aziz	INC(I)	37,046	44.09	Alluri Sarvarayudu Choudary	JP	35,428	42.17	1,618
West Godavari	73	Polavaram (ST)	Nagabhushanam Rasaputra	INC(I)	35,514	60.37	Modiyam Lakshmana Rao	JP	11,115	18.90	24,399
West Godavari	74	Chintalapudi	Gadde Venkateswara Rao	INC(I)	31,746	40.09	Mandalapu Satyanarayana	JP	26,490	33.46	5,256
Krishna	75	Jaggayyapet	Bodulluru Rama Rao	INC(I)	30,209	42.71	Komaragiri Krishna Mohan Rao	JP	22,498	31.81	7,711
Krishna	76	Nandigama	Mukkapati Venkateswara Rao	JP	31,771	41.35	Gude Madhusudhana Rao	INC(I)	24,493	31.88	7,711
Krishna	77	Vijayawada West	Pothina Chinna	INC(I)	33,587	38.20	Mohammed Imthizuddin	JP	29,198	33.21	4,389
Krishna	78	Vijayawada East	Nadendla Bhaskara Rao	INC(I)	30,039	44.59	Bayana Appa Rao	JP	26,925	39.97	3,114
Krishna	79	Kankipadu	Koneru Ranga Rao	INC(I)	38,815	50.06	Tummala Chowdary	JP	29,061	37.59	9,754
Krishna	80	Mylavaram	Chenamolu Venkata Rao	INC(I)	28,838	38.36	T.E.S.Anandabai	JP	23,518	31.28	5,320
Krishna	81	Tiruvuru (SC)	Vakkalagadda Adamu	INC(I)	30,057	40.33	Kota Punnaiah	JP	24,773	33.24	5,284
Krishna	82	Nuzvid	Paladugu Venkata Rao	INC(I)	40,524	21,336	Kolli Varaprasada Rao	JP	21,336	26.39	19,188
Krishna	83	Gannavaram	Puchalapalli Sundarayya	CPI(M)	35,984	49.58	Lanka Venkateswara Rao (Chinni)	INC(R)	18,472	25.45	17,512
Krishna	84	Vuyyur	Vadde Sobhanadreeswara Rao	JP	38,598	55.04	Kakani Ramamohana Rao	INC(I)	31,527	44.96	7,071
Krishna	85	Gudivada	Katari Satyanarayan Rao	INC(I)	38,060	49.33	Puttagunta Venkata Subbarao	CPI(M)	32,236	41.78	5,824
Krishna	86	Mudinepalli	Pinnamaneni Koteswara Rao	INC(I)	37,609	47.86	Kaza Ramanatham	JP	25,777	32.80	11,832
Krishna	87	Kaikalur	Kanumuri Bapi Raju	IND	24,669	34.08	Sudabathula Nageswara Rao	INC(I)	24,623	34.01	46
Krishna	88	Malleswaram	Buragadda Niranjana Rao	JP	27,912	37.30	Yella Balaramamurthy	INC(I)	24,690	33.30	3,222
Krishna	89	Bandar	Vaddi Ranga Rao	JP	30,400	40.44	Chillamkurti Veeraswamy alias Ambulu	INC(I)	28,498	37.91	1,902
Krishna	90	Nidumolu (SC)	Guturu Bapanayya	CPI(M)	39,806	53.22	Kalapala Nancharayya	INC(I)	19,970	26.70	19,836
Krishna	91	Avanigadda	Mandali Venkata Krishna Rao	INC(I)	30,396	43.88	Saikam Arjuna Rao	JP	29,909	43.18	487
Guntur	92	Kuchinapudi	Evuru Subba Rao	JP	30,791	45.93	Mandali Subrahmanyam	INC(I)	25,523	38.07	5,268
Guntur	93	Repalle	Koratala Satyanarayana	CPI(M)	26,319	40.01	Yadam Channaiah	INC(I)	22,848	34.73	3,473
Guntur	94	Vemuru	Yadkapati Venkat Rao	INC(I)	34,624	42.92	Veeraiah Kodali	JP	34,118	42.29	506
Guntur	95	Duggirala	G.Vedantha Rao	INC(I)	31,843	42.53	Gudibandi Nagi Reddy	CPI(M)	30,773	41.10	1,070
Guntur	96	Tenali	Doddapaneni Indira	JP	39,368	51.05	Venkatravu Nannapaneni	INC(I)	37,358	48.45	2,010
Guntur	97	Ponnur	Gogineni Nageswara Rao	INC(I)	30,006	42.80	Talasila Venkataramalah	JP	22,614	32.19	7,452
Guntur	98	Bapatla	Kona Prabhakara Rao	INC(I)	40,332	46.95	Muppalaneni Seshagiri Rao	JP	40,143	46.73	189
Guntur	99	Prathipadu (Guntur)	Karumuru Lakshminarayanareddy	INC(I)	27,961	39.07	K.Sadasiva Rao	JP	26,703	37.31	1,258
Guntur	100	Guntur-I	Eswara Rao Lingamsetty	INC(I)	40,901	51.13	Abdulla Khan Mohammad	JP	25,341	31.68	15,560
Guntur	101	Guntur-II	Gade Durga Prasunamba	INC(I)	26,472	43.42	Nissankararao Venkatarathnam	JP	19,607	32.16	6,865
Guntur	102	Mangalagiri	G.V.Pathaiah	JP	27,032	38.72	Thulabandula Nageswara Rao	INC(I)	22,999	32.95	4,033
Guntur	103	Tadikonda (SC)	T.Amrutha Rao	INC(I)	34,042	46.84	Jonnakuti Kirihsna Rao	JP	27,565	37.93	6,477
Guntur	104	Sattenapalli	Ravela Venkatrao	INC(I)	37,740	43.65	Puthumbaka Venkatapathi	CPI(M)	28,371	32.81	9,369
Guntur	105	Peddakurapadu	Ganapa Ramaswamy Reddy	JP	45,052	49.90	Syed Mahaboob	INC(I)	41,757	46.25	3,295
Guntur	106	Gurzala	Gadipudi mallikarjunarao	INC(I)	44,652	54.58	Mandapati Nagireddy	CPI(M)	21,404	26.16	9,369
Guntur	107	Macherla	Challa Narapa Reddy	INC(I)	27,350	39.52	Karpurapu Kotaiah	JP	21,598	31.21	5,752
Guntur	108	Vinukonda	Avudari Venkateswarlu	IND	21,781	29.21	Gangineni Venkateswara Rao	IND	19,762	27.19	2,019
Guntur	109	Narasaraopet	Kasu Venkata Krishna Reddy	INC(R)	27,387	32.12	Kothuri Venkateswarlu	JP	20,482	24.02	6,905
Guntur	110	Chilakaluripet	Somepalli Sambaiah	INC(I)	42,392	52.60	Bhimireddy Subba Reddy	JP	24,929	30.93	17,463
Prakasam	111	Chirala	Mutte Venkateswarlu	INC(I)	36,114	43.47	Sajja Chandramouli	JP	34,257	41.23	1,857
Prakasam	112	Parchur	Maddukuri Narayana Rao	INC(I)	38,024	48.44	Gade Venkata Reddy	JP	33,087	42.15	4,937
Prakasam	113	Martur	Jagarlamudi Chandramouli	JP	39,067	51.36	Kandlmalla Butehaiah	INC(I)	27,963	36.76	11,104
Prakasam	114	Addanki	Karanam Balaram Krishna Murthy	INC(I)	36,312	44.65	Chenchu Garataiah Bachina	JP	31,162	38.31	5,150
Prakasam	115	Ongole	Srungarapu Jeevaratnam Naidu	INC(I)	32,574	44.97	Balineni Venkateswara Reddy	JP	27,494	37.96	5,080
Prakasam	116	Santhanuthalapadu (SC)	Vema Yellaiah	INC(I)	34,270	46.82	Tavanam Chenchaiah	CPI(M)	20,228	27.63	14,042
Prakasam	117	Kandukur	Divi Kondaiah Chowdary	INC(I)	35,361	46.68	Manugunta Adinarayana Reddy	JP	23,056	30.44	12,305
Prakasam	118	Kanigiri	Budulapalle Ramasubba Reddy	INC(I)	36,693	48.86	Parna Venkaiah Naidu	JP	34,572	46.27	1,941
Prakasam	119	Kondepi	Gundapneni Pattabhi Ramaswami Chowdari	INC(I)	37,785	51.18	Chaganti Rosaiah Naidu	JP	19,494	26.40	18,291
Prakasam	120	Cumbum	Kandula Obula Reddy	INC(I)	33,191	45.51	Mahammad Shafief Shaik	JP	26,712	36.62	6,479
Prakasam	121	Darsi	Berre Gnana Prakasam	INC(I)	24,225	34.71	Muvvala Srihari Rao	JP	22,767	32.62	1,458
Prakasam	122	Markapur	Poola Subbaiah	CPI	28,030	38.51	Venna Venkata Narayanareddy	JP	27,947	38.39	83
Prakasam	123	Giddalur	Pidathala Ranga Reddy	JP	30,705	49.44	Mudiam Peera Reddy	INC(R)	20,533	33.06	10,172
Nellore	124	Udayagiri	Venkaiah Naidu	JP	33,268	47.99	Madala Janaki Ram	INC(I)	23,608	34.05	9,960
Nellore	125	Kavali	Kaliki Yanadi Reddy	INC(I)	44,456	60.45	Gottapati Kondapanaidu	JP	23,419	31.84	21,037
Nellore	126	Allur	Giddaluru Sundara Ramaiah	INC(I)	34,859	47.59	Rebala Dasaratha Ramireddy	JP	20,893	28.52	13,966
Nellore	127	Kovur	Pellakuru Ramachandra Reddy	INC(I)	43,213	57.35	Jakka Venkata Reddy	CPI(M)	23,953	31.79	19,260
Nellore	128	Atmakur (Nellore)	Bommireddy Sudararami Reddy	INC(I)	36,045	43.86	China Kondaiah Ganga	JP	32,807	39.92	3,238
Nellore	129	Rapur	Nuvvula Venkataratnam Naidu	INC(I)	46,901	60.72	Dega Narasimha Reddy	JP	18,125	23.47	28,776
Nellore	130	Nellore	Kunam Venkata Subba Reddy	INC(I)	50,202	67.40	Anam Venkata Reddy	JP	18,934	25.42	31,268
Nellore	131	Sarvepalli	Chiittoor Venkata Sesha Reddy	INC(I)	43,851	51.11	Anam Baktavatsala Reddy	JP	21,889	25.51	21,962
Nellore	132	Gudur (SC)	Patra Prakasa Rao	INC(I)	41,563	55.05	Meriga Ramakrishnaiah	IND	15,851	21.00	25,712
Nellore	133	Sulurpet (SC)	Pitla Venkatasubbaiah	INC(I)	37,054	57.00	Doddi Veeraswamy	JP	15,640	24.06	21,414
Nellore	134	Venkatagiri	Srinivasulu Reddy Nallapareddy	INC(I)	26,696	34.37	Padileti Venkataswamy Reddy	JP	26,284	33.84	412
Chittoor	135	Srikalahasti	Challa Lakshminarayana	JP	23,643	33.32	Tripurna Raghavadas	INC(I)	16,556	23.33	7,087
Chittoor	136	Satyavedu (SC)	C. Das	INC(I)	32,755	51.82	Yidaguri Gangadharam	JP	20,328	32.16	12,427
Chittoor	137	Nagari	Reddivari Chengareddi	INC(I)	33,448	39.65	Chilakam Ramachandra Reddy	JP	25,995	30.85	7,453
Chittoor	138	Puttur	K.B. Siddaiah	JP	28,766	40.42	P.Narayana Reddy	INC(I)	19,543	27.56	9,223
Chittoor	139	Vepanjeri (SC)	Bangala Arumugan	JP	33,960	49.67	K.Munaiah	INC(I)	23,034	33.69	10,926
Chittoor	140	Chittoor	N.P.Venkateswara Choudary	JP	29,941	41.03	C.V.L. Narayana	INC(I)	29,941	41.03	8,802
Chittoor	141	Palmaner (SC)	A. Rathnam	INC(I)	28,363	46.83	Anjineyulu	JP	23,287	38.45	5,076
Chittoor	142	Kuppam	B.R.Doraswami Naidu	INC(I)	24,664	41.39	D.Venkatachalam	JP	14,222	23.86	10,442
Chittoor	143	Punganur	K.V.Pathi	INC(I)	34,908	50.11	B.A.R.Abdul Rahim Saheb	JP	21,533	30.91	13,375
Chittoor	144	Madanpalle	Gangarapu Venkata Narayana Reddy	INC(I)	34,224	51.59	Sunku Balaram	JP	18,375	27.70	15,849
Chittoor	145	Thamballapalle	Avula Mohana Reddy	INC(I)	27,284	40.72	Kadapa Sudhakar Reddy	JP	25,236	37.67	2,048
Chittoor	146	Vayalpad	Nallari Amarnatha Reddy	INC(I)	40,460	52.10	Chanala Surendra Reddy	JP	30,416	39.17	10,044
Chittoor	147	Pileru	Mogul Syfullah Baig	INC(I)	36,476	46.76	Peddireddy Ramachandra Reddy	JP	22,203	28.46	14,273
Chittoor	148	Chandragiri	N. Chandrababu Naidu	INC(I)	35,092	44.23	Kongara Pattabhi Rama Chowdary	JP	32,598	41.09	2,494
Chittoor	149	Tirupathi	Agarala Eswarareddy	INC(I)	23,635	34.86	Pandraveti Gurava Reddy	IND	21,708	32.02	1,927
Kadapa	150	Kodur (SC)	Nidiganti Venkatasubbaiah	JP	19,079	30.78	Yerrathota Venkatasubbaiah	IND	17,391	28.066	1,688
Kadapa	151	Rajampet	Konduru Prabhavatamma	INC(R)	36,854	44.29	Bandaru Rathanasabhathi	IND	27,032	32.49	9,822
Kadapa	152	Rayachoti	Sugavasi Palakondarayudu	JP	39,523	49.21	Mahal Habeebulla	INC(I)	36,838	45.87	2,685
Kadapa	153	Lakkireddipalli	Gadikota Rama Subba Reddy	INC(I)	40,238	57.17	Rajagopal Reddy	JP	27,441	38.99	12,797
Kadapa	154	Cuddapa	Gajjala Ranga Reddy	INC(I)	30,784	37.60	R.Rajagopala Reddy	JP	30,062	36.72	722
Kadapa	155	Badvel	Vaddamani Sivarama Krishna Rao	JP	44,542	55.54	B. Veera Reddy	INC(I)	34,359	42.84	10,183
Kadapa	156	Mydukur	D. L. Ravindra Reddy	IND	22,181	29.49	Settipalli Chinna Nagireddy	JP	21,846	29.04	335
Kadapa	157	Proddatur	Chandra Obulreddy Rami Reddy	INC(I)	34,160	42.34	Gouru Pulla Reddy	JP	23,450	29.07	10,710
Kadapa	158	Jammalamadugu	Chavva Morammagari Ramanatha Reddy	JP	50,760	61.15	Ponnapureddy Siva Reddy	INC(I)	27,886	33.60	22,874
Kadapa	159	Kamalapuram	Perla Siva Reddy	IND	25,821	35.24	Vutukuru Rami Reddy	JP	24,101	32.80	1,720
Kadapa	160	Pulivendla	Y. S. Rajasekhar Reddy	INC(R)	47,874	59.51	D.Narayana Reddy	JP	27,378	34.03	20,496
Anantapur	161	Kadiri	Nizam Vali	INC(I)	40,984	54.58	Dorigallu Raja Reddy	JP	25,176	33.53	15,808
Anantapur	162	Nallamada	Agisam Veerappa	INC(I)	31,349	46.28	K.Rmachandra Reddy	JP	29,5134	43.57	1,836
Anantapur	163	Gorantla	P. Bayapa Reddy	INC(I)	27,039	38.86	Narayana Reddy	IND	24,142	34.70	2,897
Anantapur	164	Hindupur	K. Thippe Swami	INC(I)	42,091	60.87	K.Nagabhushana Reddy	JP	20,731	29.98	21,360
Anantapur	165	Madakasira	Y. C. Thimma Reddy	INC(I)	39,168	58.56	N.Srirama Reddy	JP	27,717	41.44	11,451
Anantapur	166	Penukonda	Somandepalli Narayana Reddy	INC(I)	30,415	45.72	Gangula Narayana Reddy	JP	29,775	44.75	640
Anantapur	167	Kalyandrug (SC)	H.Narsappa	JP	23,364	37.44	Vishwanatham	INC(I)	19,937	31.95	3,427
Anantapur	168	Rayadrug	K.B.Chenna Mallappa	INC(I)	31,591	46.64	Uddihal Motappa	JP	26,363	38.92	5,228
Anantapur	169	Uravakonda	Rayala Vemanna	INC(I)	34,344	54.19	P.Venkata Narayana	JP	14,357	22.65	19,987
Anantapur	170	Gooty	K. Venkataramaiah	INC(I)	24,185	43.84	Jaffar Sab	JP	18,944	34.34	5,241
Anantapur	171	Singanamala (SC)	B. Rukmini Devi	JP	20,385	50.22	K. Ananda Rao	INC(I)	16,758	41.28	3,627
Anantapur	172	Anantapur	B.T.L.N.Chowdary	INC(I)	28,204	44.94	Meda Subbaiah	JP	24,869	39.63	3,334
Anantapur	173	Dhamavaram	Gonuguntla Ananthareddy	INC(I)	38,297	52.25	Chinna Chigullarevu Lakshminarayana Reddy	JP	25,120	34.27	13,177
Anantapur	174	Tadpatri	Diddekunta Venkata Reddy	INC(I)	28,793	40.99	Mutyala Kesava Reddy	JP	23,280	33.14	5,513
Kurnool	175	Alur (SC)	Eranna	INC(I)	23,044	58.45	H. Eranna	JP	9,646	24.47%	13,398
Kurnool	176	Adoni	H. Satyanarayana	INC(I)	25,872	39.09	H. Sitarama Reddy	INC(R)	13,494	20.39	12,378
Kurnool	177	Yemmiganur	Hanumantha Reddy	INC(I)	30,491	47.03	Ramchandra Reddy	INC(R)	18,484	28.51	12,007
Kurnool	178	Kodumur (SC)	Muniswamy	INC(R)	27,790	47.32	M. Sikhamani	INC(I)	21,782	37.09	6,008
Kurnool	179	Kurnool	Md. Ibrahim Khan	INC(I)	34,446	54.44	B. Shamshir Khan	JP	20,781	32.84	13,665
Kurnool	180	Pattikonda	K.V. Narasappa	INC(I)	28,179	47.07	P. Ramakrishna Reddy	IND	18,045	30.14	10,134
Kurnool	181	Dhone	K. E. Krishna Murthy	INC(I)	41,054	69.75	Mekala Seshanna	INC(R)	11,104	18.86	29,950
Kurnool	182	Koilkuntla	K. Anki Reddy	JP	38,871	56.38	Battula Venkata Nagi Reddy	INC(I)	26,203	38.00	12,668
Kurnool	183	Allagadda	Gangula Thimma Reddy	IND	43,126	53.20	Somula Venkata Subba Reddy	INC(I)	35,721	44.07	7,405
Kurnool	184	Panyam	Erasu Ayyapu Reddy	JP	35,588	50.32	Munagala Bala Rami Reddy	INC(I)	26,838	37.95	8,750
Kurnool	185	Nandikotkur	Byreddy Seshasayana Reddy	INC(I)	42,035	55.13	Madduru Subba Reddy	IND	31,263	41.00	10,772
Kurnool	186	Nandyal	Bojja Venkata Reddy	JP	37,470	49.82	S.B.Nabi Saheb	INC(I)	35,777	47.57	1,693
Kurnool	187	Atmakur (Kurnool)	A.Vengal Reddy	INC(I)	42,271	60.52	T.Rangasai	JP	19,709	28.22	22,562
Mahabubnagar	188	Achampet (SC)	R.M.Manohar	INC(I)	30,026	48.64	Puttapaga Radhakrishna	JP	20,716	33.56	9,310
Mahabubnagar	189	Nagarkurnool	Srinivasa Rao	INC(I)	18,632	29.19	V. N. Goud	INC(R)	17,263	27.05	1,369
Mahabubnagar	190	Kalwakurthy	Jaipal Reddy	JP	36,544	47.96	Kayithi Kamala Kantha Rao	INC(R)	23,164	30.40	13,380
Mahabubnagar	191	Shadnagar (SC)	Bheeshva Kistaiah	INC(I)	30,669	53.25	Bangaru Laxman	JP	20,926	36.33	9,743
Mahabubnagar	192	Jadcherla	N. Narasappa	INC(I)	32,707	58.26	Raghunandan Reddy	JP	14,967	26.66	9,743
Mahabubnagar	193	Mahbubnagar	M.Ram Reddy	INC(I)	23,861	49.69	K. K. Reddy	JP	12,349	25.72	11,512
Mahabubnagar	194	Wanaparthy	Moolamalla Jayaramulu	INC(I)	30,354	48.51	Dr.A.Balakrishnaiah	JP	25,445	40.66	11,512
Mahabubnagar	195	Kollapur	Kotha Venkateswar Rao	INC(R)	36,325	50.26	Kondagari Ranga Dasu	JP	21,662	29.97	14,663
Mahabubnagar	196	Alampur	Ram Bhupal Reddy	JP	23,998	35.85	T. Rajani Babu	IND	23,873	35.66	125
Mahabubnagar	197	Gadwal	D.K.Satya Reddy	JP	35,374	54.76	Paga Pulla Reddy	INC(R)	16,980	26.29	18,394
Mahabubnagar	198	Amarchinta	Veera Reddy	INC(I)	34,737	49.52	Som Bhopal	JP	29,419	49.14	5,318
Mahabubnagar	199	Makthal	G. Narasimhulu Naidu	INC(I)	29,627	46.81	Chittem Narsi Reddy	JP	24,471	38.66	5,156
Mahabubnagar	200	Kodangal	Gurunath Reddy	IND	22,936	36.86	Chinna Veeranna (Puli)	INC(I)	19,213	30.88	3,723
Ranga Reddy	201	Tandur	M. Manik Rao	INC(I)	40,817	63.81	Sirigiripet Reddy	JP	22,023	34.43	18,794
Ranga Reddy	202	Vicarabad (SC)	V. B. Thirmalayya	INC(I)	31,253	56.85	Devadasu	JP	19,151	34.84	12,102
Ranga Reddy	203	Pargi	Ahmed Shareef	INC(I)	32,488	47.72	K.Ram Reddy	INC(R)	23,915	35.13	8,573
Ranga Reddy	204	Chevella	Chirag Pratap Lingam	JP	26,071	37.92	T.R.Anandam	INC(I)	20,752	30.18	5,319
Ranga Reddy	205	Ibrahimpatnam (SC)	Sumitra Devi	INC(I)	37,400	57.30	K.R.Krishna Swami	JP	13,899	21.29	23,501
Hyderabad	206	Musheerabad	Nayani Narasimha Reddy	JP	25,238	40.92	Tanguturi Anjaiah	INC(I)	23,071	37.41	2,167
Hyderabad	207	Himayatnagar	Lakshmi Kantama	JP	23,566	44.88	Mallu Kodati Raj	INC(I)	19,841	37.78	3,725
Hyderabad	208	Sanathnagar	S.Ramdass	INC(I)	23,155	38.99	N.V.Bhaskar Rao	CPI(M)	21,393	36.03	1,762
Hyderabad	209	Secunderabad	L. Narayana	JP	21,946	39.04	T.D.Gowri Shanker	INC(I)	13,794	24.54	8,152
Hyderabad	210	Khairatabad	P. Janardhana Reddy	IND	24,462	41.06	Ale Narendra	JP	23,808	39.96	654
Hyderabad	211	Secunderabad Cantt. (SC)	B. Machinder Rao	JP	15,946	39.56	Muthu Swamy	INC(I)	15,580	38.65	366
Hyderabad	212	Malakpet	Kandala Prabhakar Reddy	JP	25,400	40.88	B. Sarojini Pulla Reddy	INC(I)	24,279	39.07	1,121
Hyderabad	213	Asifnagar	B. Krishna	INC(I)	18,784	34.31	Syed Vicaruddin	JP	16,057	29.33	2,727
Hyderabad	214	Maharajgunj	Shiv Pershad	INC(I)	22,801	45.09	Badri Vishal Pitti	JP	22,535	44.56	266
Hyderabad	215	Karwan	Shiv Lal	INC(I)	17,242	37.33	Gulam Ghouse Khan	IND	12,677	27.44	4,565
Hyderabad	216	Yakutpura	Baqerr Agha	IND	24,094	48.85	Syed Hasan	JP	12,400	25.14	11,694
Hyderabad	217	Chandrayangutta	Md. Amanullah Khan	IND	16,890	35.95	M. Baliah	INC(I)	15,557	33.12	1,333
Hyderabad	218	Charminar	Sultan Salahuddin Owaisi	IND	30,328	51.98	Ahmed Hussain	JP	10,546	18.07	19,782
Ranga Reddy	219	Medchal	Marri Chenna Reddy	INC(I)	42,680	57.12	T. Mohan Reddy	JP	19,502	26.10	23,178
Medak	220	Siddipet	Ananthula Madan Mohan	INC(I)	32,729	49.91	Tadsina Mahendar Reddy	INC(R)	11,254	17.16	21,475
Medak	221	Dommat	Aireni Lingaiah	INC(I)	24,260	39.12	C.Rama Rao	JP	20,176	32.54	4,084
Medak	222	Gajwel (SC)	Gajwel Saidaiah	INC(I)	33,550	52.87	Allam Sailu	JP	24,819	39.11	8,731
Medak	223	Narsapur	Chilumula Vittal Reddy	CPI	33,975	49.57	Chowti Jagannath Rao	INC(I)	31,755	46.63	2,220
Medak	224	Sangareddy	Narsimha Reddy	IND	35,730	44.36	P. Ramachandra Reddy	JP	17,520	21.75	18,210
Medak	225	Zahirabad	Mogaligundla Baga Reddy	INC(I)	38,291	55.54	P.Narasimha Reddy	JP	28,981	42.04	9,310
Medak	226	Narayankhed	Shivrao Shettkar	INC(I)	34,992	51.60	M. Venkata Reddy	INC(R)	23,715	34.97	11,277
Medak	227	Medak	Seri Laxma Reddy	INC(I)	34,464	53.56	Karanam Ramachandra Rao	INC(R)	16,022	24.90	18,442
Medak	228	Ramayampet	Rajaiahgari Muthyam Reddy	INC(I)	48,093	67.19	M.Kondal Reddy	JP	15,665	21.89	32,428
Medak	229	Andole (SC)	C. Rajanarasimha	INC(R)	23,403	39.08	A.Sadanand	INC(I)	22,665	37.85	738
Nizamabad	230	Balkonda	Gaddam Rajaram	INC(I)	40,977	64.73	G. Madhusudhan Reddy	JP	20,133	31.80	20,844
Nizamabad	231	Armur	Sanigaram Santosh Reddy	INC(I)	44,628	67.65	K.R.Govind Reddy	JP	12,771	19.36	31,857
Nizamabad	232	Kamareddy	B. Balaiah	INC(I)	27,542	42.63	Aedla Raja Reddy	IND	21,866	33.84	5,676
Nizamabad	233	Yellareddy	Taduri Bala Goud	INC(I)	43,615	65.98	Vittalreddygari Venkat Rama Reddy	JP	18,305	27.69	25,310
Nizamabad	234	Jukkal (SC)	S. Gangaram	INC(I)	23,052	49.04	J.Eshwari Bai	RPI(K)	15,405	32.77	7,647
Nizamabad	235	Banswada	M.Sreenivasa Rao	INC(I)	31,178	43.72	Narayan Rao Jadav	IND	11,940	16.74	19,238
Nizamabad	236	Bodhan	Gulam Samdhani	INC(I)	34,526	54.21	M. Narayan Reddy	INC(R)	11,440	17.96	23,086
Nizamabad	237	Nizamabad	A.Kishan Das	INC(I)	33,375	55.09	Gaddam Ganga Reddy	JP	19,342	31.92	14,033
Nizamabad	238	Dichpalli	Ananthareddy Balreddy	INC(I)	39,087	66.23	D.R.Bhoom Rao	INC(R)	7,296	12.36	31,791
Adilabad	239	Mudhole	G. Gaddenna	INC(R)	33,490	53.30	Kaddam Bhim Rao	JP	9,473	15.08	24,017
Adilabad	240	Nirmal	P.Ganga Reddy	INC(I)	24,021	38.22	P.Narsa Reddy	INC(R)	22,013	35.02	2,008
Adilabad	241	Boath (ST)	T.Amar Singh	INC(I)	22,333	47.73	Ganesh Jadhav	JP	7,071	15.11	15,262
Adilabad	242	Adilabad	Chilkuri Ramachandra Reddy	IND	28,905	44.37	Chilkuri Vaman Reddy	INC(I)	20,313	31.18	8,592
Adilabad	243	Khanapur (ST)	Ambajee	INC(I)	16,182	36.40	S.A.Devshah	INC(R)	12,439	27.98	15,262
Adilabad	244	Asifabad (SC)	Dasari Narsaiah	INC(I)	15,812	36.33	Gunda Mallesh	CPI	11,963	27.49	3,849
Adilabad	245	Luxettipet	Chunchu Lakshmaiah	JP	22,716	36.38	Kande Venkata Ramanaiah	INC(I)	20,744	33.32	1,972
Adilabad	246	Sirpur	K. V. Keshavulu	INC(I)	21,210	38.43	C. Madhava Reddy	JP	14,424	26.13	6,786
Adilabad	247	Chennur (SC)	C.Narayana	INC(I)	25,476	49.80	Votarikari Prabahkar	JP	11,878	23.22	13,598
Karimnagar	248	Manthani	Chandrupatla Narayana Reddy	INC(I)	20,482	38.09	Voora Srinivasa Rao	INC(R)	11,890	22.11	8,592
Karimnagar	249	Peddapalle	G. Raji Reddy	INC(I)	31,946	48.09	Bayyapu Kishan Reddy	IND	13,507	20.33	18,439
Karimnagar	250	Mydaram (SC)	G. Eashwar	INC(I)	28,754	51.14	Pandugu Venkat Swamy	INC(R)	12,305	21.89	16,449
Karimnagar	251	Huzurabad	Duggirala Venkat Rao	INC(R)	35,561	44.95	Aligrieddy Kasi Viswanath Reddy	JP	21,822	27.58	13,739
Karimnagar	252	Kamalapur	P.Janardhan Reddy	JP	26,269	33.92	Madadi Ramachandra Reddy	INC(I)	23,128	29.86	3,141
Karimnagar	253	Indurthi	Deshini Chinna Mallaiah	CPI	21,735	31.84	Bopparaju Lakshmikanth Rao	INC(I)	20,021	29.33	1,714
Karimnagar	254	Karimnagar	Nalamachu Kondaiah	INC(I)	36,734	53.38	J. Chokka Rao	JP	14,750	21.43	21,984
Karimnagar	255	Choppadandi	NyalaKonda Sripathi Rao	INC(I)	26,311	40.94	Muduganti Krishna Reddy	INC(R)	20,054	31.20	6,257
Karimnagar	256	Jagtial	Deevakonda Surender Rao	INC(I)	32,848	53.87	Joginipalli Damodhar Rao	JP	14,704	24.11	18,144
Karimnagar	257	Buggaram	Amballa Rajaram	INC(I)	35,992	53.07	Velichala Jagapathi Rao	INC(R)	18,686	27.55	17,306
Karimnagar	258	Metpalli	Vardineni Venkateswar Rao	INC(I)	37,352	60.00	Chennamaneni Rajeshwar Rao	INC(R)	10,044	16.13	27,308
Karimnagar	259	Sircilla	Chennamaneni Rajeshwara Rao	CPI	28,685	40.42	Nagula Mallaiah	INC(I)	18,807	26.50	9,878
Karimnagar	260	Narella (SC)	Pati Rajam	INC(I)	37,626	55.60	Gotte Bhoopathi	INC(R)	23,975	35.43	13,651
Warangal	261	Cheriyal	Gorla Shiddaiah	INC(I)	18,547	31.52	Nimma Raja Reddy	IND	11,491	19.53	7,056
Warangal	262	Jangaon	Kodoor Varda Reddy	INC(I)	26,272	39.50	Asireddy Narasimha Reddy	CPI(M)	23,901	35.93	2,371
Warangal	263	Chennur	Nemarugommula Yethi Raja Rao	INC(R)	28,658	41.68	Nayani Chittaranjan Reddy	JP	23,816	34.64	4,842
Warangal	264	Dornakal	Surendra Reddy	INC(R)	30,294	49.01	Yerramreddy Narsimha Reddy	INC(I)	16,685	26.69	13,609
Warangal	265	Mahbubabad	Jannareddy Janardhan Reddy	INC(R)	24,036	35.67	Badhavath Babu	INC(I)	20,995	31.15	3,041
Warangal	266	Narsampet	Maddikayala Omkar	CPI(M)	35,931	50.58	Ghanta Pratap Reddy	INC(R)	14,418	20.29	21,513
Warangal	267	Waradhanapet	Macherla Jagannadham	JP	24,113	37.08	Takkallapally Purushotham Rao	INC(R)	20,118	30.94	3,995
Warangal	268	Ghanpur Station (SC)	Goka Ramaswamy	INC(I)	32,855	51.61	Katam Lingaiah	JP	18,486	29.04	14,369
Warangal	269	Warangal	Arelli Buchaiah	INC(I)	27,244	47.48	Bhoopathi Krishna Murthy	JP	13,978	24.36	13,266
Warangal	270	Hanamkonda	Tiruvarangam Haygrivachary	INC(I)	32,806	47.90	P.Uma Reddy	JP	19,786	28.89	13,020
Warangal	271	Shyampet	Chandupatla Janga Reddy	JP	26,457	42.26	Pingili Dharma Reddy	INC(I)	25,875	41.13	582
Warangal	272	Parkal (SC)	Bochu Sammaiah	INC(I)	25,656	44.47	Marepalli Eliah	JP	16,869	29.24	8,787
Warangal	273	Mulug (ST)	Porika Jagan Naik	INC(I)	21,449	34.83	Charpa Bhoja Rao	JP	19,980	32.46	1,469
Khammam	274	Bhadrachalam (ST)	Murla Yerraiah Reddy	CPI(M)	21,006	36.04	Pusam Tirupathaiah	INC(I)	18,660	32.01	2,346
Khammam	275	Burgampahad (ST)	Punem Ramachandraiah	INC(R)	21,287	37.43	Payam Mangaiah	INC(I)	20,256	35.61	1,031
Khammam	276	Kothagudem	Kasaiah Chekuri	JP	32,409	47.42	Vanama Venkateshwara Rao	INC(R)	21,761	32.04	10,648
Khammam	277	Sathupalli	Jalagam Vengala Rao	INC(R)	42,102	52.79	Kaloji Narayana Rao	JP	19,483	24.43	22,619
Khammam	278	Madhira	Bandaru Prasada Rao	INC(I)	31,115	38.13	Maddineni Narasimha Rao	JP	24,863	30.47	6,252
Khammam	279	Palair (SC)	Hassainu Potta Pinjara	INC(I)	30,107	41.71	Kota Guru Murthy	JP	24,355	33.74	5,752
Khammam	280	Khammam	Kesara Anantha Reddy	INC(I)	32,335	43.16	Chirravoori Laxmi Narsaiah	CPI(M)	21,918	29.26	10,417
Khammam	281	Shujatnagar	Buggarapu Sitaramaiah	INC(I)	27,725	43.36	Puvvada Nageswara Rao	CPI	21,971	34.08	5,934
Khammam	282	Yellandu (ST)	Chapala Yerraiah	IND	14,897	25.35	Kangala Buchaiah	CPI(M)	14,559	24.77	338
Nalgonda	283	Thungathurthi	Mallu Swarajyam	CPI(M)	25,580	33.50	Jannareddy Shyamsunder Reddy	IND	19,933	26.10	5,647
Nalgonda	284	Suryapet (SC)	Annumulapuri Paradamulu	INC(I)	33,095	49.44	Marapangu Mysiah	JP	21,693	32.40	11,402
Nalgonda	285	Kodad	Akkiraju Vasudeva Rao	JP	31,785	38.01	Kunchapu Lakshmana Raju	INC(I)	28,090	33.59	3,695
Nalgonda	286	Miryalguda	Aribandi Lakshmi Narayana	CPI(M)	32,381	35.08	Tedla Langaiah	INC(I)	30,416	32.95	1,965
Nalgonda	287	Chalakurthi	Nimmala Ramulu	INC(I)	32,820	43.71	Kunduru Jana Reddy	JP	18,644	24.83	14,176
Nalgonda	288	Nakrekal	Narra Raghava Reddy	CPI(M)	25,687	35.66	Masaram Narasaiah	INC(I)	19,238	26.71	6,449
Nalgonda	289	Nalgonda	Gutha Mohan Reddy	INC(I)	27,904	40.68	Chakilam Srinivasa Rao	JP	23,731	34.60	4,173
Nalgonda	290	Ramannapet	Kommu Papaiah	INC(I)	29,242	39.24	Gurram Yadagiri Reddy	CPI	24,175	32.44	5,067
Nalgonda	291	Alair (SC)	Sallooru Poshiah	INC(I)	36,989	52.47	Kota Guru Murthy	JP	17,852	25.32	19,137
Nalgonda	292	Bhongir	Kommidi Narasimha Reddy	INC(I)	46,257	62.75	Konda Laxman Bapuji	JP	18,835	25.55	27,422
Nalgonda	293	Mungode	Palvai Govardhan Reddy	INC(R)	31,635	44.75	Kancharla Ramakrishna Reddy	JP	18,004	25.47	13,631
Nalgonda	294	Devarakonda (ST)	D. Ravindra Naik	INC(I)	35,340	56.48	Kethavathu Harya	CPI	19,666	31.43	15,674
