= Sompeta =

- Census Town
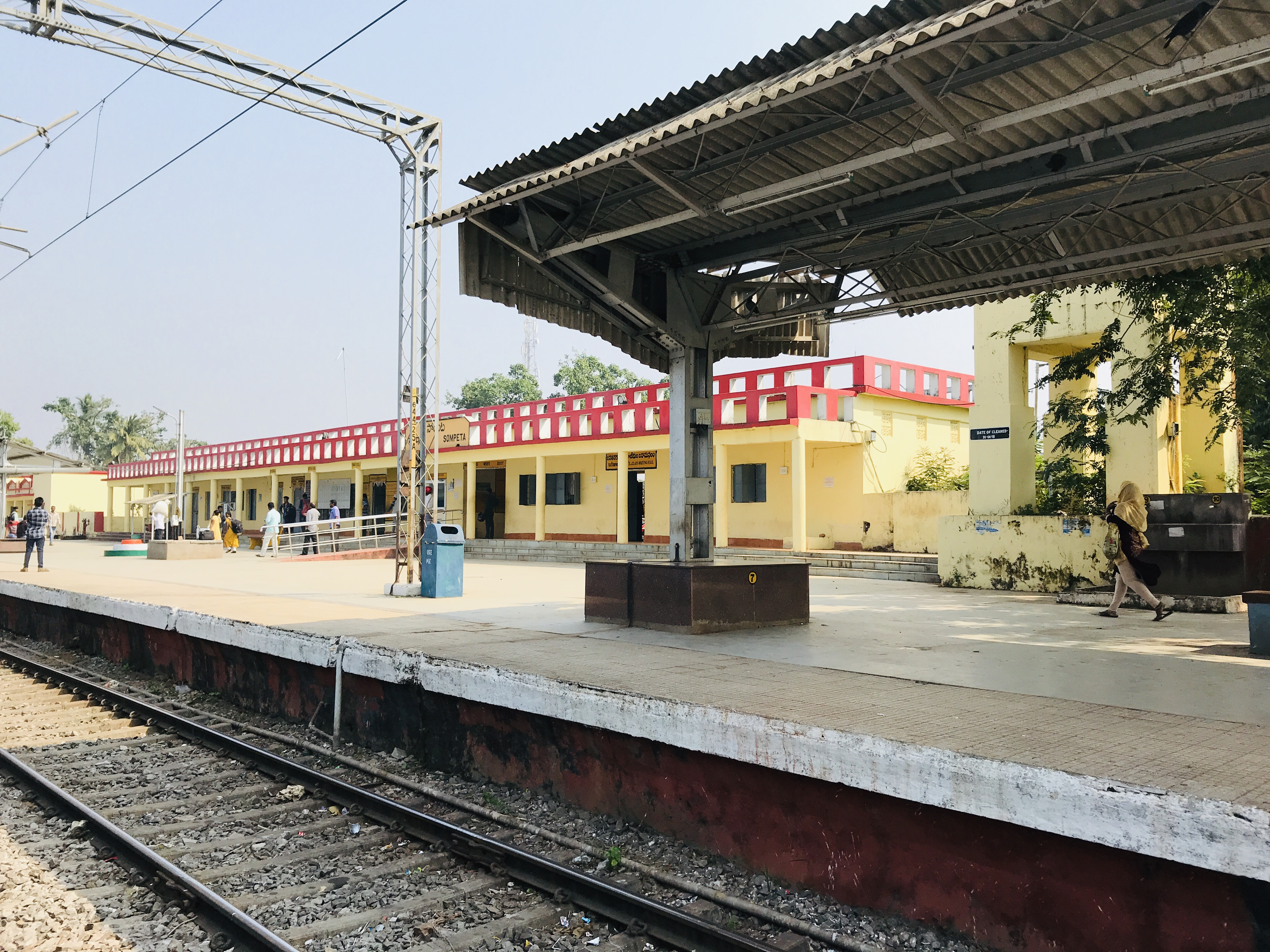
- Sompeta railway station

- Location in Andhra Pradesh, India
- Coordinates: 18.93°N 84.6°E
- Country: India
- State: Andhra Pradesh
- District: Srikakulam

Area
  - Total: 11.10 km^{2} (4.29 sq mi)

Population (2011)
  - Total: 18,778
  - Density: 1,692/km^{2} (4,382/sq mi)

Languages
  - Official: Telugu[తెలుగు]
- Time zone: UTC+5:30 (IST)
- PIN: 532284
- Telephone code: +91.8947
- Vehicle registration: AP-30 (former); AP–39 (from 30 January 2019)

Sompeta is a census town in Srikakulam district of the Indian state of Andhra Pradesh. It is the mandal headquarters of Sompeta mandal in Palasa revenue division.

== Geography ==
Sompeta is located at 18.93°N 84.6°E. It has an average elevation of 8 metres (26 feet).

== Demographics ==
Sompeta is a Census Town city in the district of Srikakulam, Andhra Pradesh. The Sompeta Census Town has a population of 18,778 of which 8,968 are males while 9,810 are females as per report released by Census India 2011.

The population of children aged 0-6 is 1822 which is 9.70% of the total population of Sompeta (CT). In Sompeta Census Town, the female sex ratio is 1094 against the state average of 993. Moreover the child sex ratio in Sompeta is around 947 compared to Andhra Pradesh state average of 939. The literacy rate of Sompeta city is 76.23%, higher than the state average of 67.02%. In Sompeta, male literacy is around 84.55% while the female literacy rate is 68.75%.

Sompeta Census Town has total administration over 4,605 houses to which it supplies basic amenities like water and sewerage. It is also authorized to build roads within Census Town limits and impose taxes on properties coming under its jurisdiction.

== Assembly constituency ==
Sompeta was an Assembly Constituency in Andhra Pradesh. However, Sompeta Assembly Constituency ceases to exist as an assembly constituency as per the delimitation process recently carried out. Part of the constituency includes Sompeta mandal will be part of Ichchapuram Assembly Constituency. The other part makes into the newly formed Palasa Assembly Constituency. Smt. Chitrada Nagaratnam is Sarpanch of the Town. Chitrada Srinivasa Rao is present MPP of Sompeta.

List of elected members:

- 1951, 1955, 1962, 1967 and 1978 - Gouthu Latchanna
- 1972 - Majji Thulasi Das.
- 1983 - Majji Narayana Rao
- 1985, 1989, 1994, 1999 and 2004 - Syama Sundara Sivaji
- 2009 - Piria Sairaj
- 2014,2019- Bendalam Ashok

== Education ==
The primary and secondary school education is imparted by government, aided and private schools, under the School Education Department of the state. The medium of instruction followed by different schools is English, Telugu.

== Famous in Sompeta ==
- Appadaalu (Paapad) is one of the famous in the Sompeta city.
- It is also famous for cashew as the city is near to the Palasa.
