= 1962 Andhra Pradesh Legislative Assembly election =

- 19 February 1962

All 300 seats in the Andhra Pradesh Legislative Assembly 151 seats needed for a majority
- Registered: 19,007,856
- Turnout: 12,165,283 (64.00%)
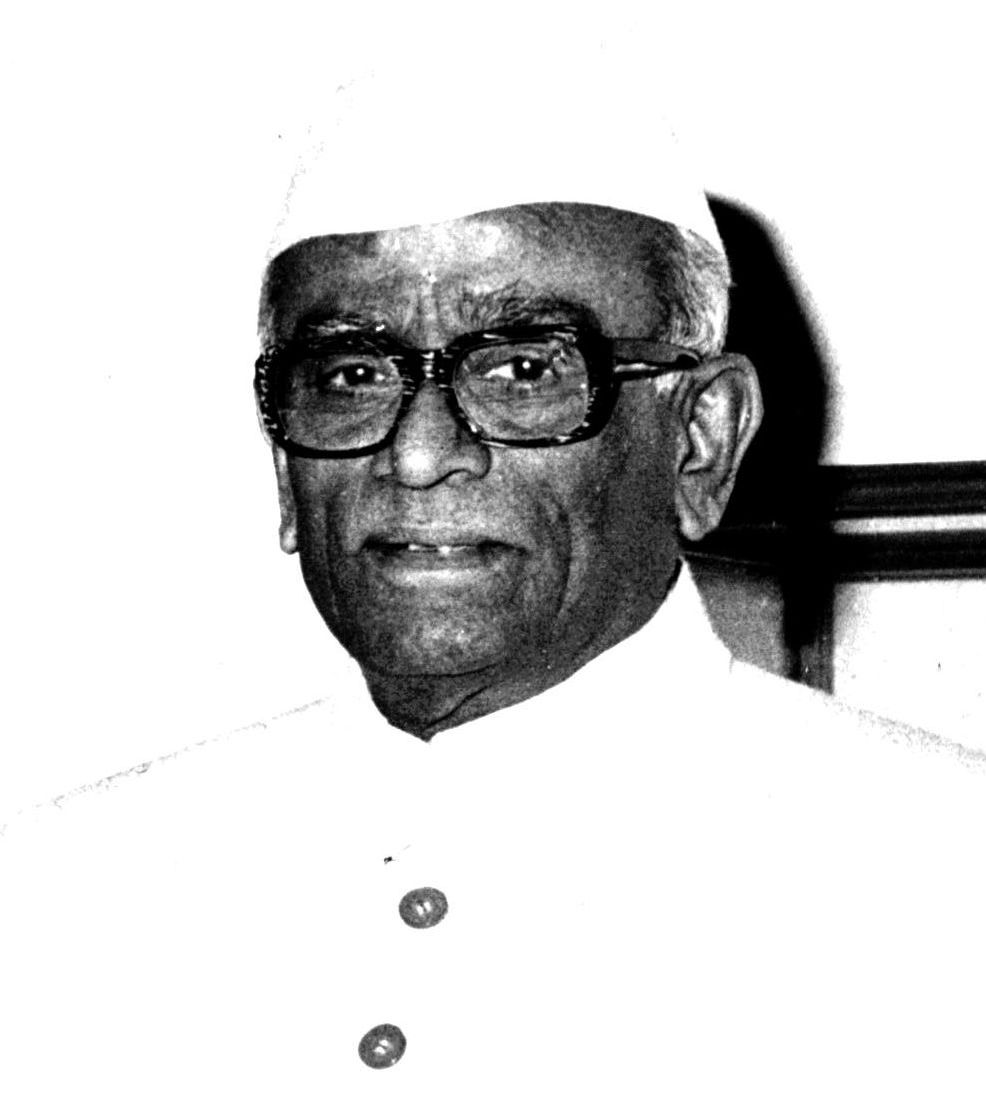

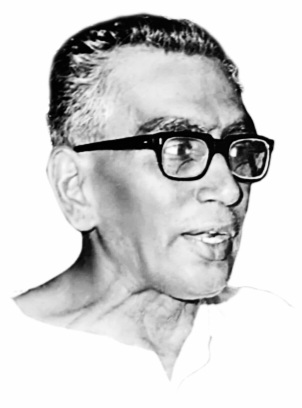

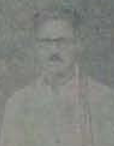
	Majority party	Minority party	Third party
Leader	Neelam Sanjiva Reddy	T. Nagi Reddy	Gouthu Latchanna
Party	INC	CPI	SWA
Leader since	1951	1962	1958
Leader's seat	Dhone (won)	Puttur (won)	Sompeta (won)
Last election	187 seats, (Note: Includes the total number of seats from the 1955 elections (held in the Andhra region) and 1957 elections (held in the Telangana region).) 41.72% (Note: Includes the total percentage of votes from the 1955 elections (held in the Andhra region) and 1957 elections (held in the Telangana region).)	37 seats, 29.54% (Note: In the 1955 elections (held in the Andhra region), the party contested as the Communist Party of India (CPI), while in the 1957 elections (held in the Telangana region), it contested as the People's Democratic Front (PDF).)	Party did not exist
Seats won	177	51	19
Seat change	▼10	▲14	New party
Popular vote	5,523,359	2,282,767	1,215,987
Percentage	47.25%	19.53%	10.40%
Swing	▲5.53%	▼10.01%	New party
- 1962 Andhra Pradesh Legislative Assembly election results
Chief Minister before election
Damodaram Sanjivayya
INC
Chief Minister after election
Neelam Sanjiva Reddy
INC

The 1962 Andhra Pradesh Legislative Assembly election was held in 1962. It was the third after formation of states. The INC won 177 seats out of 300 seats. CPI won 51 seats and Independents also won 51 seats.

The number of polling stations was 21,587 and the number of electors per polling station was 881.

== Results ==
Party	Votes	%	+/–	Seats	+/–
Indian National Congress	5,523,359	47.25	▲5.53%	177	▼10
Communist Party of India	2,282,767	19.53	▼10.01%	51	▲14
Swatantra Party	1,215,987	10.40	new party	19	new party
Socialist Party	70,878	0.61	new party	2	new party
Bharatiya Jana Sangh	121,721	1.04	▲0.93%	0	Steady
Republican Party of India	46,338	0.40	▲0.23%	0	▼1
Praja Socialist Party	34,732	0.30	▼5.30%	0	▼14
Independents	2,393,415	20.48	▲3.45%	51	▲17
Total	11,689,197	100.00	–	300	▼1
Valid votes	11,689,197	96.09			
Invalid/blank votes	476,086	3.91			
Total votes	12,165,283	100.00			
Registered voters/turnout	19,007,856	64.00			

== List of Assembly constituencies and winners ==
Constituency	Reserved for (SC/ST/None)	Member	Party
Ichapuram	None	Kirti Chandra Deo	Indian National Congress
Sompeta	None	Gouthu Latchanna	Swatantra Party
Brahmanatarla	None	Bendi Laxminarayanamma	Indian National Congress
Tekkali	None	Ronanki Satyanarayana	Swatantra Party
Narasannapeta	None	Simma Jagannadham	Swatantra Party
Patapatnam	None	Lukalapu Lakshmana Dasu	Indian National Congress
Kothuru	SC	Pothula Gunnayya	Indian National Congress
Naguru	ST	Addakula Laxmunaidu	Indian National Congress
Parvathipuram	None	Vyricherla Chandra Chudamani Deo	Indian National Congress
Pachipenta	ST	Dippala Suri Dhora	Indian National Congress
Salur	None	Sree Raja Lakshmi Narasimha Sanyasi Raju	Independent
Bobbili	None	Tentu Lakshmunaidu	Indian National Congress
Balijipeta	None	Vasireddi Krushnamurithi Naidu	Indian National Congress
Vunukuru	None	Palavalasa Sangamnaidu	Indian National Congress
Palakonda	None	Kemburu Suryanarayana Naidu	Swatantra Party
Nagarikatakam	None	Thammineni Paparao	Indian National Congress
Srikakulam	None	Andhavarapu Thavitiah	Indian National Congress
Shermuhammadpuram	None	Balllada Hariyappadu Reddi	Independent
Ponduru	SC	Kotapalli Punnaiah	Indian National Congress
Cheepurupalli	None	Kotla Sanyasi Appala Naidu	Swatantra Party
Bhogapuram	None	Kommuru Appadu Dhora	Indian National Congress
Ramathirtham	SC	Gantlana Suryanarayana	Indian National Congress
Gajapathinagaram	None	Taddi Sanayasi Naidu	Indian National Congress
Vizianagaram	None	Bhattam Sriramamurty	Indian National Congress
Revidi	None	Kolla Appalanaidu	Independent
Bheemunipatnam	None	P. V. G. Raju	Indian National Congress
Visakhapatnam	None	Asnkitham Venkata Bhanoji Rao	Indian National Congress
Kanithi	None	Kancharla Sreeramamurthy	Indian National Congress
Parvada	None	Salapu China Appalanaidu	Independent
Anakapalli	None	Koduganti Govinda Rao	Communist Party of India
Chodavaram	None	Ilapakuthi Satyanarayana	Indian National Congress
Boddam	None	Allu Dasavatharam	Indian National Congress
Srungavarapukota	ST	Gujjala Dharam Naidu	Indian National Congress
Madugula	None	Tenneti Viswanatham	Independent
Kondakarla	None	Pentakota Venkataramana	Communist Party of India
Elamanchili	None	Veesam Sanyasinaidu	Indian National Congress
Payakaraopeta	SC	Mande Pitchaiah	Communist Party of India
Narasipatnam	None	Ruthala Latchapatrudu	Swatantra Party
Golugonda	None	Sunkara Appala Naidu	Swatantra Party
Chintapalli	ST	Depuru Kondalarao	Indian National Congress
Yellavaram	ST	Chodi Mallikharjuna	Indian National Congress
Korukonda	None	Kandru Veeranna	Indian National Congress
Burugupudi	SC	Bathina Subha Rao	Indian National Congress
Rajahmundry	None	Pothula Veertabhadra Rao	Indian National Congress
Jaggampeta	None	Vaddi Mutyala Rao	Indian National Congress
Peddapuram	None	Pantham Padmanabham	Indian National Congress
Prathipadu	None	Mudragada Veeraraghavarao	Independent
Tuni	None	Raja V. V. Krishnamraju Bahadur	Indian National Congress
Pithapuram	None	Rao Bhavanna	Indian National Congress
Samalkot	None	Mohammad Ismail	Indian National Congress
Kakinada	None	Dantu Bhaskara Rao	Indian National Congress
Karapa	None	Remalla Thirupatirao	Indian National Congress
Tallarevu	SC	Ganti Kamayya	Indian National Congress
Ramachandrapuram	None	Nandivada Satyanrayanarao	Independent
Anaparthi	None	Palacherla Panasaramanna	Communist Party of India
Pamarru	None	S. B. P. Pattabhirama Rao	Indian National Congress
Cheyyeru	None	Palla Venkata Rao	Indian National Congress
Amalapuram	None	Kudupudi Suryanarayana	Independent
Allavaram	SC	Chikile Gangi Setti	Indian National Congress
Razole	SC	Gaddem Mahalakshmi	Indian National Congress
Nagaram	None	Nayinala Ganeswararao	Indian National Congress
Kothapetha	None	M. V. S. Subba Raju	Indian National Congress
Narasapur	None	Parakala Seshavatharam	Indian National Congress
Palacole	None	Addepalli Satyanarayana Moorty	Indian National Congress
Achanta	SC	Paddala Syamasundra Rao	Communist Party of India
Penugonda	None	Vanka Satyanarayana	Communist Party of India
Attili	None	S.r. Datla	Communist Party of India
Pentapadu	None	Chintalapati Prasada Murti Raju	Indian National Congress
Tanuku	None	Mullapudi Harischandraprasad	Indian National Congress
Kovvur	None	Alluri Bapineedu	Indian National Congress
Gopalpuram	SC	Taneti Veeraraghavulu	Indian National Congress
Polavaram	None	Karatam Baburao	Communist Party of India
Chintalapudi	SC	Revulagadda Yesupadam	Indian National Congress
Tadepalligudem	None	Alliuri Krishna Row	Indian National Congress
Dendulur	None	Motaparthi Ramamohanarao	Independent
Eluru	None	Attuluri Sarwesvara Rao	Communist Party of India
Undi	None	Gokaraju Rangaraju	Indian National Congress
Bhimavaram	None	Nachu Venkara Ramaiah	Indian National Congress
Kaikalur	None	Kammili Appa Rao	Indian National Congress
Mudinepalli	None	Boppana Hanumantha Rao	Indian National Congress
Gudivada	SC	Ganji Rama Rao	Communist Party of India
Gannavaram	None	Puchalapalli Sundariah	Communist Party of India
Kankipadu	None	Chennupati Ramakotaiah	Indian National Congress
Vijayawada South	None	Ayyadevara Kaleswara Rao	Indian National Congress
Vijayawada North	None	Tammina Potharaju	Communist Party of India
Mylavaram	None	Vellanki Visvaswararao	Communist Party of India
Nandigama	None	Pillalamarri Venkateswarlu	Communist Party of India
Jaggayyapet	ST	Galeti Venkateswarlu	Indian National Congress
Tiruvur	None	Peta Bapayya	Indian National Congress
Nuzvid	None	Meka Raja Rangayyappa Rao	Indian National Congress
Vuyyur	None	Kakani Venkataratnam	Indian National Congress
Malleswaram	None	Pinnenti Pamideswara Rao	Indian National Congress
Bandar	None	Pedasingu Lakshmana Rao	Independent
Avanigadda	None	Yarlagadda Sivarama Prasad	Indian National Congress
Nidumolu	SC	Gunturu Bapanayya	Communist Party of India
Kuchinapudi	None	Evuru Subbarao	Independent
Repalle	None	Koratala Satyanarayana	Communist Party of India
Vemur	None	Kalluri Chandramouli	Indian National Congress
Duggirala	None	Lankireddi Lakshma Reddy	Indian National Congress
Tenali	None	Alapati Venkatramaiah	Indian National Congress
Ponnur	None	Nannapaneni Venkatrao	Indian National Congress
Bapatla	None	Kommineni Venkateswararao	Independent
Chirala	None	Jagarlamudi Laxminarayana Chowdary	Communist Party of India
Paruchuru	None	Naraharisetti Venkataswamy	Communist Party of India
Peddakakani	None	Panguluri Koteswararao	Communist Party of India
Mangalagiri	None	Vemulapalli Srikrishna	Communist Party of India
Guntur I	None	Kanaparthi Nagaiah	Communist Party of India
Guntur II	None	Chebrolu Hamumaiah	Indian National Congress
Peddakurapadu	None	Ganapa Ramaswami Reddy	Indian National Congress
Phirangipuram	None	Kasu Brahmananda Reddy	Indian National Congress
Sattenapalli	None	Vavilala Gopalakrishnaiah	Independent
Gurzala	None	Kotha Venkateswaralu	Indian National Congress
Macherla	ST	Mudavathu Kesavanayakudu	Indian National Congress
Vinukonda	None	Pulupula Venkatasiviah	Communist Party of India
Martur	None	Nooti Venkateswarlu	Indian National Congress
Narasaraopet	None	Chapalamadugu Ramaiah Chowdary	Indian National Congress
Addanki	None	Patibandla Ranganayakulu	Communist Party of India
Ammanabrolu	None	Sudanagunta Singaiah	Communist Party of India
Ongole	None	Bollineni Venkatalakshmi Narayana	Independent
Santhanuthalapadu	SC	Tavanam Chenchaiah	Communist Party of India
Darsi	None	Dirisala Venkataramana Reddy	Indian National Congress
Podili	None	Katuri Narayanaswamy	Indian National Congress
Kanigiri	None	Kotapati Guruswamy Reddy	Communist Party of India
Udayagiri	None	P. Venkata Reddy	Indian National Congress
Kandukur	None	Nalamothu Chanchurama Naidu	Indian National Congress
Kondapi	None	Chaganti Rosaiah Naidu	Indian National Congress
Nandipad	None	Kovi Ramaiah Chowdary	Indian National Congress
Kavali	ST	Yalampalli Penchalaiah	Indian National Congress
Kovur	None	Rebala Dasaratharama Reddy	Indian National Congress
Buchireddipalem	SC	Swarna Vemayya	Communist Party of India
Atmakur	None	Anam Sanjeeva Reddy	Indian National Congress
Rapur	None	Anamchenchu Subba Reddy	Indian National Congress
Venkatagiri	SC	Allam Krushnaih	Indian National Congress
Nellore	None	Ganga China Kondaiah	Indian National Congress
Sarvepalli	None	Vemareddy Venkureddy	Independent
Gudur	SC	Merlapaka Munuswami	Indian National Congress
Sullurpet	None	Pasupuleti Siddiahnaidu	Indian National Congress
Yerpedu	SC	Patra Singariah	Indian National Congress
Kalahasti	None	Adduru Balarami Reddi	Indian National Congress
Vadamalpet	None	P. Narayana Reddy	Indian National Congress
Nagari	None	Dommaraju Gopalu Raju	Independent
Satyavedu	SC	Tambura Balakrushniah	Indian National Congress
Vepanjeri	None	G. N. Pattabhi Reddy	Independent
Chittoor	None	C. D. Naidu	Swatantra Party
Tavanampalle	None	P. Rajagopal Naidu	Swatantra Party
Kuppam	None	A. P. Vajravelu Chetty	Communist Party of India
Palmaner	SC	Kusini Nanjappa	Indian National Congress
Punganur	None	Varanasi Ramaswamy Reddy	Indian National Congress
Madanapalle	None	Dodda Seetharamiah	Communist Party of India
Thamballapalle	None	Kadapa Narasimha Reddy	Swatantra Party
Vayalpad	None	N. Amaranadha Reddy	Independent
Pileru	None	C. K. Narayana Reddy	Communist Party of India
Tirupathi	None	Reddivari Nadamuni Reddy	Indian National Congress
Kodur	SC	N. Penchalaiah	Swatantra Party
Rajampet	None	Kondur Marareddi	Swatantra Party
Rayachoti	None	Rachamalla Narayana Reddy	Swatantra Party
Lakkireddipalli	None	Galivati Viswanathareddy	Independent
Cuddapah	None	Pullaguri Seshaiah	Independent
Badvel	None	Vaddamani Chidanandam	Swatantra Party
Mydukur	None	Pelakolanu Narayana Reddy	Swatantra Party
Proddatur	None	Panyam Yerramuni Reddy	Independent
Jammalamadugu	None	Thathireddi Narasimhareddy	Indian National Congress
Kamalapuram	None	Vaddamani Venkata Reddy	Indian National Congress
Pulivendla	None	Chavva Bali Reddy	Independent
Kadiri	ST	E. Gopalu Naik	Indian National Congress
Nallamada	None	Y. Papi Reddy	Independent
Gorantla	None	B. V. Bayappa Reddy	Indian National Congress
Hindupur	None	K. Ramakrishna Reddy	Independent
Madakasira	SC	B. Rukmini Devi	Indian National Congress
Penukonda	None	Narasi Reddy	Independent
Dharmavaram	None	P. Venkateswara Choudari	Indian National Congress
Anantapur	None	P. Antony Reddy	Indian National Congress
Putloor	None	Tarimela Nagi Reddy	Communist Party of India
Tadpatri	None	C. Kulasekhara Reddy	Independent
Gooty	None	V. K. Adinarayana Reddy	Communist Party of India
Uravakonda	None	Gurram Chinna Venkanna	Independent
Rayadrug	None	Lakka Chinnapa Reddy	Indian National Congress
Kalyandrug	SC	Hindi Narasappa	Indian National Congress
Allur	None	D. Lakshmikantha Reddy	Indian National Congress
Adoni	None	H. Sitarama Reddy	Independent
Kosigi	None	Satyanarayana Raju	Indian National Congress
Yemmiganur	None	Y. C. Veerabhadra Gowd	Swatantra Party
Kodumur	SC	D. Sanjivayya	Indian National Congress
Pattikonda	None	K. B. Narasappa	Indian National Congress
Dhone	None	Neelam Sanjeeva Reddy	Indian National Congress
Kurnool	None	T.k.r. Sarma	Independent
Nandikotkur	None	Pulyala Venkatakrishna Reddy	Independent
Midthur	None	E. Ayyapu Reddy	Indian National Congress
Nandyal	None	Mallu Subba Reddy	Independent
Koilkuntla	None	B. V. Subba Reddy	Indian National Congress
Allagadda	SC	Sitri Jayaraju	Indian National Congress
Giddalur	None	Edula Balarami Reddy	Independent
Markapur	None	Kandula Obula Reddy	Indian National Congress
Yerragondipalem	None	Poola Subbaiah	Communist Party of India
Kalwakurthi	None	Venkat Reddy	Independent
Achampet	SC	K. Naganna	Indian National Congress
Kollapur	None	K. Rang Das	Indian National Congress
Alampur	None	D. Muralidhar Reddy	Indian National Congress
Gadwal	None	Krishna Ram Bhopal	Indian National Congress
Wanaparthi	None	Kumudini Devi	Indian National Congress
Atmakur	None	Som Bhopal	Independent
Makthal	None	Kalyani Ramchander Rao	Indian National Congress
Madoor	SC	Elleri Basappa	Indian National Congress
Kodangal	None	Rukma Reddy	Swatantra Party
Mahabubnagar	None	M. Ram Reddy	Independent
Shadnagar	None	Damodara Reddy	Indian National Congress
Jadcherla	None	Keshavulu	Independent
Nagarkurnool	SC	P. Mahendranath	Indian National Congress
Musheerabad	None	T. Anjaiah	Indian National Congress
Sultan Bazar	None	Vasudev Krishanji Naik	Indian National Congress
Begum Bazaar	None	K. Seethaiah Gupta	Indian National Congress
Asafnagar	None	M. M. Hashim	Indian National Congress
High Court	None	B. Ramdev	Indian National Congress
Malakpet	None	Mir Ahamed Ali Khan	Indian National Congress
Yakutpura	None	M. A. Rasheed	Indian National Congress
Pathergatti	None	Sultan Salahuddin Owaisi	Independent
Secunderabad	None	K. S. Narayana	Indian National Congress
Secunderabad Cantonment	None	B. V. Gurumurthy	Indian National Congress
Hyderabad East	SC	Sumitra Devi	Indian National Congress
Jubillee Hills	None	Roda H. P. Mistry	Indian National Congress
Ibrahimpatam	None	M. N. Lakshminarsaiah	Indian National Congress
Medchal	None	V. Ramchandra Rao	Independent
Chevella	SC	V. Ramarao	Indian National Congress
Pargi	None	M. Rama Deva Reddy	Indian National Congress
Tandur	None	M. Chennareddy	Indian National Congress
Vicarabad	SC	A. Ramaswamy	Indian National Congress
Zahirabad	None	M. Baga Reddy	Indian National Congress
Narayankhed	None	Ramchander Rao Deshpande	Swatantra Party
Andole	None	S. L. Devi	Indian National Congress
Sadasivpet	SC	C. Rajanarasimha	Indian National Congress
Sangareddy	None	P. Ramchandra Reddy	Indian National Congress
Narsapur	None	Vithal Reddy	Communist Party of India
Medak	None	Keval Ananda Devi	Communist Party of India
Ramayenpet	None	Reddi Ratnamma	Indian National Congress
Gajwel	SC	Gajwel Saidiah	Independent
Dommat	None	Khwaja Moinuddin	Indian National Congress
Siddipet	None	Someshwar Rao	Independent
Kamareddy	None	Vittalreddigari Venkatarama Reddy	Indian National Congress
Yellareddi	SC	T. N. Sada Lakshmi	Indian National Congress
Banswada	None	Sreenivasa Reddy	Indian National Congress
Jukkal	None	Nagnath Rao	Indian National Congress
Bodhan	None	M. Ramgopal Reddy	Independent
Nizamabad	None	Hari Narayan	Independent
Armoor	None	T. Ranga Reddy	Indian National Congress
Balkonda	None	G. Raja Ram	Indian National Congress
Mudhole	None	Gopidi Ganga Reddy	Indian National Congress
Nirmal	None	P. Narsa Reddy	Indian National Congress
Adilabad	None	Vithal Rao	Independent
Boath	None	C. Madhav Reddi	Indian National Congress
Asifabad	ST	Bhim Rao	Indian National Congress
Luxettipeth	None	G. V. Pithambara Rao	Independent
Sirpur	None	Sanjiva Reddy	Indian National Congress
Chinnur	SC	Kodati Rajamallu	Indian National Congress
Manthani	None	Pamulaparati Venkatanarasimha Rao	Indian National Congress
Peddapalli	SC	Butti Raja Ram	Indian National Congress
Sultanabad	None	Malla Reddy	Independent
Maidaram	None	M. Ramgopal Reddy	Independent
Jagtial	None	Makunooru Dharma Rao	Independent
Buggaram	None	Anugu Narayan Reddy	Independent
Metpalli	None	Vijayaranga Rao	Indian National Congress
Sircilla	None	Juwwadi Narsing Rao	Indian National Congress
Nerella	SC	Bandari Jankiram	Indian National Congress
Choppadandi	None	Bandari Ramulu	Indian National Congress
Karimnagar	None	Allireddy Kishan Reddy	Socialist Party
Indurthi	None	Bopparaju Lakshmikanth Rao	Indian National Congress
Huzurabad	SC	Gadipalli Ramulu	Indian National Congress
Kamalapur	None	K. V. Narayan Reddy	Independent
Warangal	None	Bhandaru Nagabhushanarao	Independent
Dhamasagar	None	Tiruvarangam Hayagriva Chary	Indian National Congress
Ghanpur	None	Nellutla Pushpasenam Vurap Mohan Rao	Communist Party of India
Cherial	None	Mohamed Kamaluddin Ahmed	Indian National Congress
Jangao	SC	Goka Ramalingam	Indian National Congress
Wardhannapet	None	Kundour Lakshminarasimha Reddy	Independent
Channur	None	Nemarugommula Yethiraja Rao	Socialist Party
Chillamcherla	None	Gandi Mallikarjuna Rao	Indian National Congress
Dornakal	None	N. Ramachandra Reddy	Indian National Congress
Narsampet	None	Arshanpalli Venkateshwar Rao	Communist Party of India
Hasanparthi	None	Chada Vasudeva Reddy	Swatantra Party
Parkal	SC	Rauthu Narsimha Ramiah	Indian National Congress
Mulug	None	Musinepalli Krishnaiah	Indian National Congress
Yellanda	None	Kondapalli Lakshminarasimha Rao	Communist Party of India
Burgampahad	ST	Kangala Butchayya	Communist Party of India
Bhadrachalam	None	Mahammed Tahaseel	Communist Party of India
Palwancha	None	Parsa Satyanarayana	Communist Party of India
Vemsoor	None	Jalagam Vengala Rao	Indian National Congress
Madhira	None	Duggineni Venkiah	Indian National Congress
Khammam	None	Nallamala Prasada Rao	Communist Party of India
Palair	SC	Kathula Santhiah	Indian National Congress
Suryapet	SC	Uppula Malchooru	Communist Party of India
Nagaram	None	Anireddy Ranga Reddy	Indian National Congress
Ramannapet	None	K. Ramachandra Reddy	Communist Party of India
Bhongir	None	Arutla Ramchandra Reddy	Communist Party of India
Alair	None	Arutla Kamala Devi	Communist Party of India
Chinnakondur	None	Kondaveti Gurunatha Reddy	Communist Party of India
Nalgonda	None	Bommagani Dharmabhiksham	Communist Party of India
Nakrekal	None	Nandyala Srinivasa Reddy	Communist Party of India
Huzurnagar	None	Akkiraju Vasudeva Rao	Indian National Congress
Miryalguda	None	Tippana China Krishna Reddy	Indian National Congress
Peddavoora	None	Palla Parvatha Reddy	Communist Party of India
Deverkonda	SC	Yelmineti Peddaiah	Communist Party of India
