= Ale Narendra =

Indian politician

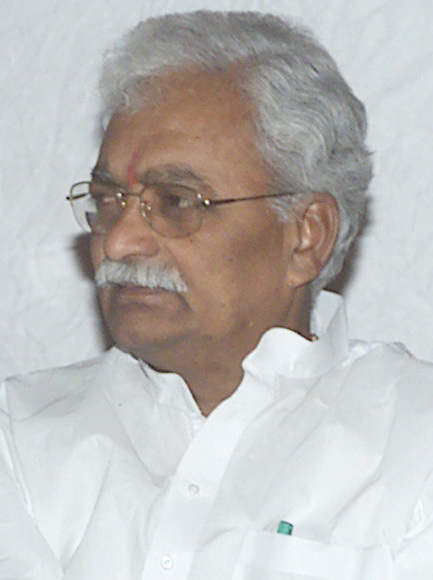

Member of Parliament
- In office 1999–2009
- Preceded by: Mogaligundla Baga Reddy
- Succeeded by: Vijayashanti
- Constituency: Medak

Personal details
- Born: 21 August 1946 Hyderabad, Hyderabad State, British India
- Died: 9 April 2014 (aged 67) Hyderabad, Telangana, India
- Party: Bharatiya Janata Party, Telangana Rashtra Samithi
- Spouse: Ale Lalita
- Children: Ale Jithendra (son); Ale Bhaskar Raj (son); Dontha Sabitha (Daughter)
- Nickname: Tiger Narendra
- As of 26 September, 2006

Ale Narendra (21 August 1946 – 9 April 2014) was an Indian politician who was a member of the 13th and 14th Lok Sabha of India. He represented the Medak Lok Sabha in 1999 and Medak in 2004. He was 3 time MLA from Himayatnagar Constituency in 1983, 1988, 1992. He was one of the biggest proponents for Telangana statehood. Ale Narendra and other individuals associated with the Rashtriya Swayamsevak Sangh (RSS).

== Electoral history ==
Year	Constituency	Party	Votes	Opponent		Result	Margin
1978	Khairatabad	Janata Party	23,808	INC	P. Janardhan Reddy	Lost	-654
1980	Hyderabad	Janata Party	135,304	INC(I)	K. S. Narayana	Lost	-31,564
1983	Chandrayangutta	BJP	40,241	Independent	Mohd. Amanullah Khan	Lost	-3,581
1983	Himayatnagar	BJP	47,139	TDP	P. Upendra	Won	28,134
1985	Himayatnagar	BJP	35,510	INC	K. Prabhakara Rao	Won	7,390
1989	Himayatnagar	BJP	37,240	INC	V. Hanumantha Rao	Lost	-4,270
1992 (By-election)	Himayatnagar	BJP	—	INC	V. Hanumantha Rao	Won	—
1994	Himayatnagar	BJP	44,210	TDP	C. Krishna Yadav	Won	17,760
1996	Hyderabad	BJP	135,304	AIMIM	Sultan Salahuddin Owaisi	Lost	-210,035
1996	Medak	BJP	152,070	INC	M. Baga Reddy	Lost	-134,208
1998	Medak	BJP	252,642	INC	M. Baga Reddy	Lost	-16,480
1999	Medak	BJP	400,244	INC	M. Baga Reddy	Won	22,083
2004	Bhongir	TRS	49,066	TDP	Alimineti Uma Madhava Reddy	Lost	-17,536
2004	Medak	TRS	453,738	BJP	P. Ramachandra Reddy	Won	123,766

== Early life ==
He was born in a Padmasali family in Aliabad of Hyderabad State to Ale Ramalingam and his wife Ale Pushpavati. He has a younger brother, Ale Shyam, a pracharak in RSS.

== Career ==
He was a member of Rashtriya Swayamsevak Sangh and later joined the political party Jan Sangh in 1962.

=== BJP ===
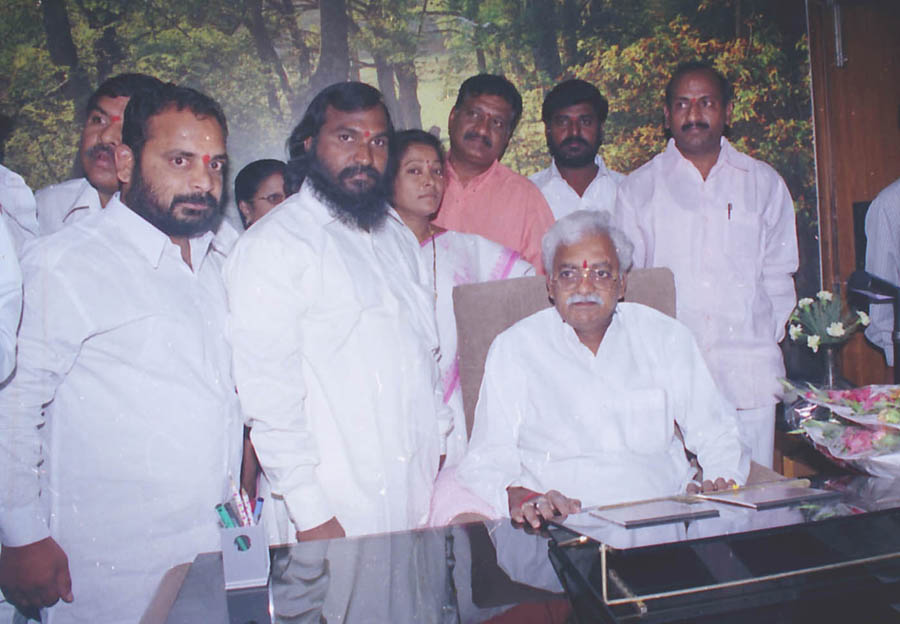
A. Narendra assumes the charge of Minister of State for Rural Development in New Delhi on May 26, 2004,

He later joined Bharatiya Janata Party after the dissolution of Jan Sangh.

He represented Himayatnagar assembly constituency thrice in 1983, 1994 and 1997. He had strong support of the public. By his early age he was RSS acolyte and with all the public support he turned out to be a leader of that time.

He won as MP from Medak in 1999 and 2004 from Medak Lok Sabha constituency. He was the state minister of Rural Development in UPA I.

=== Founding Telangana Sadhana Samithi ===
In 2001 he quit BJP in protest against not granting statehood to Telangana and launched a party called Telangana Sadhana Samithi (TSS) for achieving Telangana state. He, later on, merged with TRS Telangana Rashtra Samithi before he was asked to resign due to corruption charges.

=== Member of Parliament ===
He was elected to Lok Sabha in 1999 from Medak Lok Sabha constituency and in 2004 from Medak Lok Sabha constituency.

=== TRS ===
He joined TRS after K. Chandrashekhar Rao wanted a united fight for the achievement of Telangana state. He won as MP from the party once. After being removed from TRS, he became a non-entity in the political arena.

Year	Constituency	Party	Votes	%	Opponent	Party	Votes	%	Result	Margin	%
1978	Khairatabad (MLA)	JP	23,808	39.96	P. Janardhana Reddy	IND	24,462	41.06	Lost	−654	−1.10
1980	Hyderabad (MP)	JP	135,304	31.82	K. S. Narayana	INC(I)	166,868	39.24	Lost	−31,564	−7.42
1983	Himayatnagar (MLA)	BJP	32,800	48.55	P. Upendra	INC	23,410	34.65	Won	+9,390	+13.90
1985	Himayatnagar (MLA)	BJP	35,510	49.80	K. Prabhakara Rao	INC	28,120	39.43	Won	+7,390	+10.37
1989	Himayatnagar (MLA)	BJP	37,240	42.10	V. Hanumantha Rao	INC	41,510	46.92	Lost	−4,270	−4.82
1994	Himayatnagar (MLA)	BJP	44,210	51.35	C. Krishna Yadav	TDP	26,450	30.72	Won	+17,760	+20.63
1996	Medak (MP)	BJP	152,070	19.88	M. Baga Reddy	INC	286,278	37.42	Lost	−134,208	−17.54
1998	Medak (MP)	BJP	252,642	32.03	M. Baga Reddy	INC	269,122	34.12	Lost	−16,480	−2.09
1999	Medak (MP)	BJP	400,244	48.20	M. Baga Reddy	INC	378,161	45.54	Won	+22,083	+2.66
2004	Bhongir (MLA)	TRS	49,066	33.40	Smt. Alimineti Uma Madhava Reddy	TDP	66,602	45.40	Lost	−17,536	−12.00
2004	Medak (MP)	TRS	453,738	50.36	P. Ramachandra Reddy	BJP	329,972	36.62	Won	+123,766	+13.74

== Death ==
At the age of 67, he died after prolonged illness from paralysis and other ailments and died on 9 April 2014 at a private hospital in Hyderabad.

== Positions held ==
- Minister of State, Rural Development UPA I - 2004
- Member of Parliament, Lok Sabha - 1999 and 2004
- Member of Legislative Assembly - 1983, 1987 and 1991
