= Puchalapalli Sundarayya =

Indian politician (1913–1985)

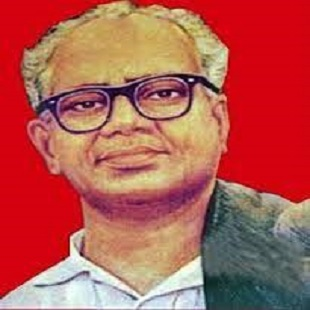

1st Leader of the Opposition Andhra Pradesh Legislative Assembly
- In office 1957–1962
- Chief Minister: Neelam Sanjiva Reddy; Damodaram Sanjivayya
- Preceded by: Position established
- Succeeded by: Tarimela Nagi Reddy
- Constituency: Gannavaram

1st Leader of the Opposition Andhra State Legislative Assembly
- In office 1955–1956
- Chief Minister: Tanguturi Prakasam Panthulu; Bezawada Gopala Reddy
- Preceded by: Position established
- Succeeded by: Position abolished
- Constituency: Gannavaram

Member of the Politburo of the Communist Party of India (Marxist)
- In office 1964–1982
- General Secretary: Himself; E. M. S. Namboodiripad

General Secretary of the Communist Party of India (Marxist)
- In office 9 November 1964 – 6 April 1978
- Preceded by: Position established
- Succeeded by: E.M.S. Namboodiripad

Member of the Andhra Pradesh Legislative Assembly
- In office 1978–1983
- Preceded by: T. S. Anand Babu
- Succeeded by: M. Rathna Bose
- Constituency: Gannavaram
- In office 1956–1967
- Preceded by: Position established
- Succeeded by: V.Seetha Ramayya
- Constituency: Gannavaram

Member of the Andhra State Legislative Assembly
- In office 1955–1956
- Preceded by: Constituency established
- Succeeded by: Position abolished (Himself as a member of the Andhra Pradesh Legislative Assembly)
- Constituency: Gannavaram

Member of Parliament, Rajya Sabha
- In office 3 April 1952 – 21 March 1955
- Preceded by: Position established
- Succeeded by: TJM Wilson
- Constituency: Madras State; Andhra State

Personal details
- Born: Puchalapalli Sundararami Reddy; 1 May 1913 Nellore, Madras Presidency, British India (now Andhra Pradesh, India)
- Died: 19 May 1985 (aged 72)
- Party: Communist Party of India (Marxist) (1964-1978)
- Other political affiliations: Communist Party of India (before 1964)
- Spouse: Lela
- Known for: Co-founder of Communist Party of India (Marxist)

Puchalapalli Sundarayya (born Sundararami Reddy; 1 May 1913 – 19 May 1985), popularly known as Comrade PS, was an Indian communist leader, and a founding member of Communist Party of India (Marxist).

== Early life ==
Sundarayya was born on 1 May 1913 in Alaganipadu (in the present Vidavalur Mandal of Kovur Constituency) in Nellore district of Andhra Pradesh, India. He was the child of a feudal Reddy family and, when Sundarayya was six, his father died. He completed primary education and entered a college where he studied at entry level until he left in 1930, at the age of 17, to join Mahatma Gandhi's non-cooperation movement. He was arrested and spent time in a Borstal school in Rajahmundry where he became acquainted with various communists and local dalit leaders. When released, he organized agricultural workers in his village to protest against bonded labour.

He was mentored by Amir Hyder Khan, who prompted him to become a member of the Communist Party of India, which was condemned and banned by the British government during the Second World War. During this period many prominent communist leaders, like Dinkar Mehta, Sajjad Zaheer, E.M.S. Namboodiripad and Soli Batliwala, became members of the national executive of the Congress Socialist Party. While a member, Sundarayya rose to the position of the Secretary of the Congress Socialist Party. After the arrest of Amir Hyder Khan, following the directions of the Central Committee, the task of building the Party in South India fell on his shoulders. During this period, he motivated transition of prominent communist leaders of Kerala like E. M. S. Namboodiripad and P. Krishna Pillai to join the Communist Party of India from the Congress Socialist Party]

In 1934, Sundarayya became a member of the Central Committee of the Communist Party of India. During the same year, he became one of the founders of the All India Kisan Sabha and was elected as its joint secretary. When the Party was banned, he went underground between 1939 and 1942.

== Telangana Rebellion ==
When the ban on the Party was lifted in 1943, the first Party Congress was held at Bombay and he was again elected to the Central Committee in the second party Congress held at Calcutta (now Kolkata). In that Congress, the Communist Party of India adopted a line advocating armed struggle, that came to be known as 'Calcutta thesis'. It was closely identified with its main proponent, the then General Secretary B.T. Ranadive. As a result, insurgencies took place in Tripura, Telangana, West Bengal and Travancore. The most important rebellion took place in Telangana, against the Nizam of Hyderabad. Sundarayya, was one of its leaders. He went underground between 1948 and 1952. He was re-elected to the Central Committee in 1952 when a special party conference was held. He was also elected to the Politburo, the highest forum within the Party. He was then re-elected to Central Committee and the Politburo in the third party congress in Vijayawada and again in the fourth congress held at Palakkad.

== In Communist Party of India (Marxist) ==
He was elected to the Central Executive and the Central Secretariat of the Party at the fifth party congress at Amritsar. At this time, the internal conflict within the Communist Party of India had heightened. The party leadership under Shripad Amrit Dange were in favor of supporting the Indian government headed by the Indian National Congress at the time of the Sino-Indian War. Also, following the Sino-Soviet difference in the international communist movement, the Party leadership under Dange was pursuing the Soviet line, which the pro-Chinese leadership within the Party called revisionist. The group under Dange was referred to as the "Rightists", and the other group, "Leftists".

Sundarayya was a prominent leader of the leftist group and he resigned the positions conferred upon him during the Amritsar congress of the Party, protesting against the policies of the dominant leadership of the Party. He was arrested and imprisoned during November 1962, at the time of the Sino-Indian border war. The split came out in open and the leftists organized the Seventh Party Congress in October–November 1964 and forming a new Party called the Communist Party of India (Marxist). Sundarayya was elected as its General Secretary.

However, immediately after this conference, Sundarayya and several party leaders were arrested because of a ruling produced by the Congress government, and they were detained until May 1966. Again, he went underground to evade arrest during the period of the then Indian prime minister, Indira Gandhi, who evoked Emergency provisions of the Indian Constitution, between 1975 and 1977, to suspend Constitutionally guaranteed 'fundamental rights'. Sundarayya remained the Party's General Secretary until 1976. In that year, he decided to resign from his post as the Party's General Secretary and gave up his Politburo membership, for what he called the "revisionist habits" acquired by the Party.

== Legislative career ==
In 1952, he was elected to the Upper House of the Indian Parliament, the Rajya Sabha from the Madras Assembly constituency and became the leader of the Communist group in Parliament. Notably, he commuted to Parliament by bicycle, contrasting with many Members of Parliament, who were often from zamindari backgrounds and arrived in luxury cars. He was elected to the State Assembly of Andhra Pradesh and remained a member of that House until 1967. After a long gap he contested again and got elected to the State Assembly of Andhra Pradesh in 1978, he continued this up to 1983. Sundarayya held the party's state secretary post in Andhra Pradesh and was a member of the Central Committee of the Party from this period to his death on 19 May 1985.
