= Gouthu Latchanna =

Indian politician (1909–2006)

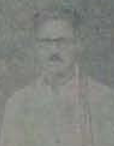
- Gouthu Latchanna

3rd Leader of the opposition in the Andhra Pradesh Legislative Assembly
- In office 1978–1983
- Governor: K. C. Abraham
- Chief Minister: Marri Chenna Reddy; Tanguturi Anjaiah; Bhavanam Venkatarami Reddy; Kotla Vijaya Bhaskara Reddy
- Preceded by: Vacant (himself 1967-72)
- Succeeded by: Mogaligundla Baga Reddy
- In office 1967–1972
- Governor: Pattom A. Thanu Pillai; Khandubhai Kasanji Desai
- Chief Minister: Kasu Brahmananda Reddy; P. V. Narasimha Rao
- Preceded by: Tarimela Nagi Reddy
- Succeeded by: Vacant (himself 1978-83)

Member of Legislative Assembly Andhra Pradesh
- In office 1978–1983
- Preceded by: Majji Thulasi Das
- Succeeded by: Majji Narayana Rao
- Constituency: Sompeta
- In office 1956–1972
- Preceded by: Andhra Pradesh Assembly Created
- Succeeded by: Majji Thulasi Das
- Constituency: Sompeta

Member of Legislative Assembly Andhra State
- In office 1955–1956
- Preceded by: Andhra State Assembly Created
- Succeeded by: Andhra Pradesh Assembly Created
- Constituency: Sompeta

Member of Legislative Assembly Madras State
- In office 1952–1955
- Preceded by: Constituency Established
- Succeeded by: Andhra State Assembly Created
- Constituency: Sompeta

Personal details
- Born: Gouthu Latchanna; 16 August 1909 Baruva, Srikakulam, British India
- Died: 19 April 2006 (aged 96) Visakhapatnam, Andhra Pradesh
- Spouse: Gouthu Yashoda
- Children: Gouthu Sundar Sivaji, Jhansi Lakshmi Ravala, Susila Devi Kasimkota

Gouthu Latchanna (16 August 1909 – 19 April 2006) was an Indian politician and freedom fighter.

== Personal life ==
Gouthu Latchanna was born in Baruva village of the Sompeta mandal, Srikakulam district, in the state of Andhra Pradesh on 16 August 1909. He was the eighth child of Chittaiah, a Srisayana(Segidi) Caste, and Rajamma. He married Yashodha Devi, who died in 1996.

He died at the age of 98 in Visakhapatnam on 19 April 2006. He was survived by his son Shyama Sunder Sivaji, MLA from Sompeta, and two daughters, Jhansi and Sushila.

== Activism and political career ==
Latchanna worked for farmers and disenfranchised people. He was arrested at the age of 21, when he participated in the Salt Satyagraha at Palasa. Latchanna also participated in the Quit India Movement. He was given the title of sardar for his activities against the British Raj.

Latchanna continued his political and social activism after Indian independence in 1947, working on behalf of farmers, labourers, and the working class. He was also a member of Madras Trade Union Board. He played a role in the fall of Prakasham Panthulu's government over the issue of prohibition.

=== Freedom fighter ===
He participated in the Swaraj movement at the age of 21, starting with the Salt Satyagraha at Palasa. He was subsequently arrested in connection with a salt-cotaurs raid at Naupada in April 1930. He was sent to Tekkali and Narasannapeta sub-jails in Srikakulam. After conviction, he was sent to Berhampur jail in Ganjam to undergo rigorous imprisonment for one month. After the Gandhi–Irwin Pact in 1931, he organized a Satyagraha camp at Baruva and led picketing of toddy, liquor, and foreign cloth shops in Ichchapuram, Sompeta, and Tekkali. In 1932, he participated in the civil disobedience movement by hoisting the Congress flag at Baruva. He was beaten for violating prohibitory orders and imprisoned for six months in Rajahmundry central jail.

In 1932, after being released from Rajahmundry jail, Latchanna organised "Harijan Seva Sangam" at Baruva, inspired by Mohandas Karamchand Gandhi's "fast-unto-death" on the issue of untouchability. He started a night school in the harijan-Cheri, agitated against untouchability, and took harijans to a drinking water well at Baruva. He and his colleagues were socially boycotted in response.

As the secretary of Andhra Rashtra Congress Committee, he organised a reception at Eluru for the soldiers of Azad Hind Fauz. Latchanna participated in the Quit India Movement in 1942. While underground, he was invited to a South Indian Congress leaders meeting at Madras. He was arrested at Rajahmundry in 1943 while en route to Madras. He was sentenced for one year for possessing seditious literature. He was released in October 1945.

==== Revolutionary influence ====
With imprisonment in Rajahmundry central jail aftermath of the civil disobedience in 1932, he came in contact with revolutionists like Vijay Kumar Sinha (Bijoy Kumar Sinha) and Siva Verma who were life-imprisoned in Lahore Conspiracy Case in connection with Bhagat Singh, who were also imprisoned in the same block in which Latchanna was imprisoned. Siva Verma and B.J. Sinha were transferred from Cellular Jail to Rajahmundry central prison, aftermath the fast-unto-death in demand for separate treatment for political prisoners. Latchanna, along with Andhra colleagues, like Anne Anjayya and Alluri Satyanarayanaraju used to have long discussions in prison about "Indian Republic Revolutionary Party" organization. They decided to start a similar revolutionary party, in Andhra after their release. As Latchanna was released with 6 months conviction before his Andhra colleagues who were convicted for one year, he and his colleagues decided to meet again to start a revolutionary party after release too. In the meantime, Latchanna went to Cuttack, Kharagpur, Tatanagar, and Calcutta to meet the "Indian Republic Revolutionary Party" leaders for joining their movement, as promised to Siva Verma and B.K. Sinha. By the time he went, all the revolutionary party members were either arrested or went underground. During this time, he fell ill in Tatanagar, and was brought back home by his brother from Tatanagar.

=== Leader for Kisans ===
Around 1932, after his return from Tatanagar to Baruva, Latchanna participated in the foot-march of Rythu-Rakshana call given by N. G. Ranga from Varanasi, of parlakimide estate to Chatrapur. He organized estate-wise "Zamindari Rythu" associations, organised indirect no-tax campaign, fought for the abolition of Zamindari system on the plea that Kisans were unable to pay the heavy land revenue levied.

In 1940, he organised All India Kisan Sabha at Palasa, which was attended by Pullela Syama Sundara Rao, N. G. Ranga, Sahajanand Saraswati, and Indulal Yagnik. The committee took the long reception of tens and thousands of hill tribals and Kisans with an effigy of Zamindari system and got it burnt publicly. It was followed by a public meeting of the All India Kisan Sabha, violating the prohibitory orders of the then Composite Madras government. Immediately, after the All India Kisan Sabha at Palasa, the "Mandasa Ryots" under the leadership of lady "Veeragunnamma" of Gudari Rajamanipuram, took out a procession with their bullock carts into the forest of the Mandasa Zamindari, cut trees, and took them to their villages openly by driving away the estate forest guards. This led to the arrest of Kisans by police, under the sub-collector of Srikakulam. Veeragunnamma died in aftermath police firing when she surrounded sub-collector's office for the release of Kisans. Latchanna along with Syama Sundara Rao visited Mandasa village to talk with sub collector, but were denied interview. Latchanna visited the village and opened a defence camp at Haripuram to prevent police harassment of farmers. When police were finding it difficult in preparing charge sheet, against Kisans, Latchanna was interned at his native village, Baruva. In spite of intensive vigilance, Latchanna toured the villages during nights and exhorted public. This secret assistance forced district collector in ordering the detention of Latchanna, which he escaped by going underground. While underground, he fought the case, and got the case struck down from sessions court.

=== Leader for weaker sections ===
In 1941, when Rangoon was bombarded during Second World War, Latchanna in spite of being underground, arranged "Burma refugee’s conference" at Narasannapeta, presided by N.G. Ranga to assist the Indian labourers in Burma who fled to their native land, India. As a result of this conference, the then Madras government was obliged to provide relief to the evacuees by constituting "Burma evacuees relief committee".

He was the founder and president of the Andhra State Unit of the Indian National Trade Union Congress, which he continued till 1955. He was the president of Shipyard Labor Union at Visakhapatnam and was instrumental in organizing strikes, getting pay scale hikes, and introduction of service grades for the workers.

On the third day after his marriage, he was obliged to proceed to Rangoon to get the Indian labourers released, who were in the concentration camps aftermath the assassination of Aung San.

=== Leader for backward castes ===
In 1948, he presided over first Andhra backward classes conference at Guntur, and decided to achieve legitimate rights and privileges embodied in the Constitution of India covering reservations and directives for their social, economical, and education development. Consequently, he took statewide tours and organized district backward classes associations, which made him designated as champion of backward classes, and was considered one of the prominent leaders of his time. In 1957, after the formation of united Andhra Pradesh, chief justice of Andhra Pradesh, high court struck down the list of Other Backward Classes approved by government of Andhra Pradesh, acting on a private complaint. Latchanna started a statewide agitation for the restoration of list of Other Backward Classes, a statutory obligation under the Articles 15(4) and 16(4) of the Constitution of India. List of Other Backward Classes were restored when Damodaram Sanjivayya became chief minister of Andhra Pradesh. High Court again struck down the list of Other Backward Classes for including Kapu community in the Other Backward Classes. Latchanna again, started statewide agitation, and demanded the government of Andhra Pradesh to renew the publication of backward classes list by omitting Kapu. The case finally went to Supreme Court of India to be represented by advocate P. Shiv Shankar on behalf of government along with an advocate appointed by Latchanna on behalf of Andhra Pradesh backward classes association. Supreme Court of India gave a favourable judgement asking the government of Andhra Pradesh to publish the list of backward classes caste wise, establishing their social and economical backwardness. In consequence, the Government of Andhra Pradesh appointed the Ananta Raman Commission, which recommended the list of Backward Classes by dividing them into 4 groups as A, B, C & D.

After N. T. Rama Rao came to power in Andhra Pradesh, when he cancelled Backward Classes scholarship grants against his election manifesto, including cancellations of licenses of the toddy tappers co-operative societies for public auctions, Latchanna took serious objection and did satyagraha on behalf of the backward classes students and toddy tappers co-operative societies for cancelling public auctions. During N. T. Rama Rao regime with statewide agitations, Latchanna was arrested more than 14 times, forcing him to take fast-unto-death to accomplish the demands. After Nadendla Bhaskara Rao overthrown N. T. Rama Rao regime through coupe, Nadendla Bhaskara Rao fulfilled the demands of Latchanna.

From 1984, disgusted with opportunistic politics of different political parties, Latchanna mostly concentrated in raising awareness among oppressed classes, using his monthly publication "Bahujana". He tried to join Bahujan Samaj Party under the leadership of Kanshiram for the upliftment of Schedule Castes, Scheduled Tribes and Backward Classes. He announced his joining in Bahujan Samaj Party in 1994 at Hyderabad, but couldn't join the Bahujan Samaj Party due to certain ideological differences, which were against backward classes of Andhra Pradesh, as he felt, Kanshiram was trying to exploit backward classes for only votes.

== Political life ==
He was member of Andhra Pradesh Legislative Assembly for 35 years, from Sompeta constituency between 1948–83 and once member of Andhra Pradesh Legislative Council. Latchanna had won both the Lok Sabha and Assembly elections, from Srikakulam district in 1967. But he resigned his Lok Sabha membership to facilitate the election of his political mentor late N.G. Ranga. He was first elected to Assembly in 1948 from Visakhapatnam on labour ticket, and served as Minister for Agriculture and Labour. He left Congress party in 1951 and was arrested during emergency in 1975 imposed by then prime minister Smt. Indira Gandhi. He later joined Lok Dal party and then to Janata Dal party under the leadership of former prime ministers Charan Singh and Vishwanath Pratap Singh respectively.

He initially, got elected as president of then Ganjam district Congress Committee. He became member of Andhra Rashtra Congress Committee and All India Congress Committee from 1934 to 1951. From 1946 to 1951, he was elected as joint secretary of Andhra Rashtra Congress Committee. As secretary of Andhra Congress Sevadal, he conducted Congress Sevadal Officer's Training Camp for both men and women at Palasa in Srikakulam.

During 1946 Madras assembly elections, he was denied congress ticket, against the wishes of congress workers on the pretext of being violent when underground. Instead, Latchanna made Rokkam Rammurthy Naidu get the nomination and played a decisive role in getting him elected. When Latchanna was in Rangoon, Babu Rajendra Prasad sent a telegram to Latchanna to file nomination for Visakhapatnam by-election from Indian National Congress in 1948. He was elected to Madras assembly defeating both communist and socialist candidates.

In 1951, he along with Tanguturi Prakasam and N.G. Ranga resigned Congress, and organised Hyderabad State Praja Party which was further split into Krishikar Lok Party for peasants with N.G. Ranga as the president and Latchanna as the secretary. In 1952 first General elections of independent India, Latchanna got elected to Madras assembly along with 11 more members in the composite Visakhapatnam district on Krishikar Lok Party ticket, by defeating congress candidate. He then became, the leader of Krishikar Lok Party in Madras assembly.

=== Agitation for Andhra statehood ===
Gouthu Latchanna was actively involved in the separate statehood for Andhra through separation from composite Madras, from 1953. When government of India constituted a partition committee under C.M. Trivedi, he represented from Krishikar Lok Party, T. Viswanadham from Praja Party and Sanjeeva Reddy from Congress, ultimately reached its climax with fast-unto-death sacrifice of Potti Sriramulu. On 1 October 1953, Andhra state was formed with Tanguturi Prakasam as chief minister, who rejoined Congress from Praja Party. Latchanna from Krishikar Lok Party joined the cabinet of Tanguturi Prakasam on 11 November 1953, to get the working majority in assembly with Kurnool as capital. Latchanna resigned from Tanguturi Prakasam on issue of state capital in 1954.

=== Agitation for Toddy Tapper Cooperative Societies ===
In 1954, with the enactment of Prohibition Act, the excise department harassed lakhs of toddy tappers, who were thrown out of employment. Latchanna organised and led the tappers satyagraha to secure rehabilitation for the unemployed tappers. More than 6000 toddy tappers, court arrested and sent to jail. Yashodadevi, wife of Latchanna, did satyagraha in Guntur with 25,000 tappers. Finally, when Latchanna passed no-confidence motion against Tanguturi Prakasam government, the government fell, leading to mid-term elections. Tanguturi Prakasam, however, had offered a ministerial berth with full power, was categorically rejected by Latchanna. With mid-term elections on hand, prime minister and president of Congress, Jawaharlal Nehru convinced N. G. Ranga, president of the Krishikar Lok Party, to merge with Congress to fight Combined Communist party. That merger was categorically rejected by Latchanna. Finally, when Jawaharlal Nehru agreed to rehabilitate toddy tappers with their conventional tapping on co-operative basis, and written agreement offer to oppose Congress in Visakhapatnam district, merger of Krishikar Lok Party in Congress to create "United Congress Front" had materialised.

After the mid-term elections, the United Congress Front defeated the communists successfully. Latchanna joined the cabinet of Bezawada Gopala Reddy.

=== Formation of Andhra Pradesh state ===
After Hyderabad State was annexed into the Indian union of states, Telugu speaking districts of Telangana were merged into Andhra state to be called Andhra Pradesh on 1 November 1956. Latchanna, as the minister of former Andhra state, was the signatory of Gentlemen's agreement to safeguard the interests and prevent discrimination against Telangana in 1956. Owing to the personal differences with Neelam Sanjiva Reddy, he was not taken into cabinet in the newly formed Andhra Pradesh state.

=== Agitation for Telangana statehood ===
Latchanna took an active part in the agitation for the separate statehood of Telangana, for which intensive Criminal Investigation Department team monitoring was initiated on him by the state along with Marri Chenna Reddy and Mallikarjun Goud. When the agitation took a serious and violent turn, prime minister of India, Indira Gandhi visited Hyderabad and succeeded in making Marri Chenna Reddy call off the agitation.

Later, Latchanna took active part in the creation of the Andhra Pradesh Democratic Front along with Congress dissident Marri Chenna Reddy, and socialist leader P.V.G.Raju. In 1958, when C. Rajagopalachari, president of Swatantra Party, visited Hyderabad, Latchanna joined Swatantra Party by dissolving the Andhra Pradesh Democratic Front. Latchanna was taken into executive committee and parliamentary board of the Swatantra Party as vice-president in 1959. In 1962, Latchanna started state wise agitation against enactment of 100% enhancement of land revenue, and filed a writ petition in high court of Andhra Pradesh leading to the declaration as null and void by the high court.

=== Swatantra Party and Democratic Front ===
In 1967, general elections, Swatantra Party won 27 MLAs and three Lok Sabha seats. Three MLAs defected and one joined in as an associate member. Swatantra Party forged an alliance with "Jana Congress Party" to form "Democratic Front". This "Democratic Front" was recognized as official opposition party in state assembly led by, Latchanna. Latchanna got elected from both Sompeta assembly, and Srikakulam parliamentary constituency on Swatantra Party ticket. As N.G. Ranga lost his election from Chittoor, Latchanna resigned Srikakulam parliamentary seat to make N.G. Ranga elected to Lok Sabha while Latchanna became the opposition leader in the assembly of Andhra Pradesh, as well as state president of Swatantra Party. Latchanna, as opposition leader in the assembly, launched statewide agitation for the withdrawal of "Land Revenue Enhancement Act 1967" and for the abolition of "Land Revenue" altogether. Swatantra party led by G. Latchanna, along with P. Rajagopal Naidu, and Bharati Devi in Andhra Pradesh state assembly opposed.

1. Land Ceiling Bill.
2. Additional Land Revenue Assessment Bill.
3. Agricultural Marketing Bill, which makes selling of agriculture commodities by peasants as crime.
4. Imposition of compulsory levy of food grains
5. Controls on food grains
6. Banning of movement of food grains to and from Belt areas on the borders of neighboring states
7. Compulsory Levies on peasants for repairing water sources.
8. Collection of contributions and loans from poor peasants for the so-called plan schemes like defence funds, and national savings schemes.
9. Inclusion of dry lands receiving water since 10 years under irrigation sources in their ayacut permanently, and succeeded in making the government accept the proposal.
10. In regard to demand for the splitting up of Joint Pattas as and when peasants set up separate family units. They made the Government to come with a bill for the purpose and got it passed.
11. They fought for the distribution of non-arable lands to the landless poor.
12. They forced the government to agree to let Sugar crop factories elect their directors instead of nominating them.
13. They achieved the abolition of "Tol Gates" in Telangana.
14. They made the government agree to the payment of arrears to the Pattadars in Telangana for tapping toddy trees.
15. They pleaded for continuation of educational concessions to all the backward classes, and also for their classification as per their caste.

=== Agitation for Jai Andhra Movement ===
In 1972, Latchanna took a leading role in the Jai Andhra movement started by students of Andhra University, demanding the division of Andhra Pradesh into old Andhra state and Telangana state on the issue of "Mulkhi" rules. He was imprisoned in Mushirabad central jail, and released in 1973.

=== Emergency in India ===
In 1975, following the State Emergency, Indira Gandhi, Latchanna was arrested on the same night in Srikalahasti, where he was attending Visakhapatnam central jail and was released in 1977 after the withdrawal of Emergency. Upon release, he went to New Delhi to attend all opposition parties conference, convened and presided by Jaya Prakash Narayan, the founder of Janata Party.

In the 1977 general elections, Latchanna was elected to the Andhra Pradesh assembly from Janata Party ticket and was recognised officially, as the opposition leader, as Janata Legislature Party was the main opposition party in the Andhra Pradesh assembly. After the demise of C. Rajagopalachari, Swatantra Party was merged into Bharatiya Lok Dal, headed by Charan Singh. Latchanna was elected as the president of Andhra Pradesh state Lok Dal. Lok Dal candidates, including Latchanna, suffered with film actor N. T. Rama Rao wave of Telugu Desam Party in 1983 general elections. Latchanna lost the elections for the first time, strangely not to Telugu Desam Party candidate, but instead to Congress candidate

Latchanna was elected to assembly repeatedly from 1952 till 1983, losing once in 1983. During this time, he was elected to the Legislative Council of Andhra Pradesh. During mid-term elections for Sompeta, Telugu Desam Party gave the ticket to Latchanna, son, Gouthu Shyam Sunder Shivaji. Latchanna too filed the nomination as an independent candidate but withdrew in last with major differences between son and Latchanna. When Telugu Desam Party denied a ticket to Gouthu Shivaji in 1989 elections, Latchanna supported his son as an independent and got him elected successfully.

== Honour ==
- Thotapalli Barrage was named after him by the Andhra Pradesh Government.
- Gouthu Latchanna Cultural Complex will be constructed by the Andhra Pradesh Government.
- Sardar Gouthu Latchanna Pratibha Puraskaramulu, an award in his name to be given every year to bright and intelligent students by Sree Koundinya Seva Samiti
- Sardar Gowthu Latchanna Kala Peetham, an award in his name to honour and recognise the arts
- In 1997, Andhra University of Visakhapatnam honoured him with a doctorate.
- In 1999, Nagarjuna University of Guntur honoured him with a doctorate.
- Statues for Sardar Gouthu Latchana

== Autobiography ==
- Naa Jeevitam (autobiography) in Telugu written by Gouthu Latchanna, 2001
