= Mogaligundla Baga Reddy =

Indian politician (born 1930)

Mogaligundla Baga Reddy మొగలిగుండ్ల బాగారెడ్డి

Member of Parliament, Lok Sabha
- In office 1989–1999
- Preceded by: P. Manik Reddy
- Succeeded by: Ale Narendra
- Constituency: Medak

9th Leader of the opposition Andhra Pradesh Legislative Assembly
- In office 14 March 1985 – 29 November 1989
- Governor: K. C. Abraham; Thakur Ramlal; Shankar Dayal Sharma
- Chief Minister: N. T. Rama Rao; Nadendla Bhaskara Rao; N. T. Rama Rao
- Preceded by: Gouthu Latchanna
- Succeeded by: N. T. Rama Rao
- Constituency: Zahirabadu

Member of Legislative Assembly Andhra Pradesh
- In office 1957–1989
- Preceded by: Andhra Pradesh Assembly Created
- Succeeded by: Patlolla Narsimha Reddy
- Constituency: Zahirabadu

Personal details
- Born: Mogaligundla Baga Reddy; 17 June 1930 Malchalma, Medak district, Hyderabad State
- Died: 4 June 2004
- Spouse: Mogaligundla Yashoda Reddy
- Children: One daughter and two sons(Mogiligundla Jaipal Reddy)

Mogaligundla Baga Reddy (born 17 June 1930) was an Indian politician who served as a member of parliament for four terms and as a member of Andhra Pradesh Legislature seven times. He was the speaker of the Andhra Pradesh legislative assembly for a period of one month and a cabinet minister. He served as the Leader of the Opposition in the Andhra Pradesh Legislative Assembly from 1985 to 1989.

== Early life and political career ==
Reddy was born on 17 June 1930 in the village of Malchalma, Medak District in India. Born into an agriculture based family, he completed his secondary education in Bidar (Karnataka) and went on to complete his B.A. L.L.B. from Osmania University in Hyderabad. He campaigned for Indira Gandhi in Medak district where she was elected as the prime minister of India in the 1980s. He was first elected to the Andhra Pradesh legislative assembly on the Congress party ticket at an age of 26 from the Zaheerabad constituency in Medak District. Since then he has been voted back to the assembly seven consecutive times. He retained his assembly seat in both 1983 and 1985 assembly elections despite there being a wave of N.T. Rama Rao's Telugu Desam Party. Reddy, held key portfolios such as Panchayati Raj, Major Industries and Revenue between 1978 and 1983 when Marri Chenna Reddy was the Chief Minister of the state. From 1989 to 1999 he served as the member of Lok Sabha from Medak constituency for four consecutive terms on Indian National Congress ticket. In 1999 Reddy lost his seat to Ale Narendra of Bharatiya Janata Party.
