= Amanullah Khan (disambiguation) =

Amanullah Khan (1892–1960) was the ruler of Afghanistan, 1919–1929.

Amanullah Khan is also the name of:

- Amanullah Khan (Herat leader) (died 2006), Afghan Pashtun who challenged the authority of Governor Ismail Khan
- Amanullah Khan Jadoon, Pakistani politician
- Amanullah Khan Zadran or just Amanullah Zadran, former Taliban leader, Pashtun, Afghan Minister of Border and Tribal Affairs 2001–2002
- Amanullah Khan (umpire) (1933–2005), Pakistani cricket umpire
- Amanullah Khan (comedian) (born 1950), Pakistani actor, producer and writer
- Amanullah Khan (JKLF) (1934–2016), Kashmiri separatist
- Amanullah Khan (Indian politician) (1950–2002), politician in Hyderabad Old City
- Amanullah Khan (Bangladeshi politician), Bangladesh Awami League politician
