= Sompeta Assembly constituency =

Former constituency of the Andhra Pradesh legislative assembly, India

Coordinates: 18.95°N 84.58°E

Sompeta
- Former constituency for the Andhra Pradesh Legislative Assembly

Constituency details
- Country: India
- Region: South India
- State: Andhra Pradesh
- District: Srikakulam
- Lok Sabha constituency: Srikakulam
- Established: 1951
- Abolished: 2008
- Reservation: None

Sompeta Assembly constituency was a constituency in Srikakulam district of Andhra Pradesh that elected representatives to the Andhra Pradesh Legislative Assembly in India. It was one of the six assembly segments in Srikakulam Lok Sabha constituency.

The constituency was established in 1951, as per the Delimitation Orders (1951) and abolished in 2008, as per the Delimitation Orders (2008).

== Members of the Legislative Assembly ==
Year	Member	Political party
1952	Gouthu Latchanna	Krishikar Lok Party
1955	Gouthu Latchanna	Krishikar Lok Party
1962	Gouthu Latchanna	Krishikar Lok Party
1967	Gouthu Latchanna	Krishikar Lok Party
1972	Majji Thulasi Das	Indian National Congress
1978	Gouthu Latchanna	Janata Party
1983	Majji Narayana Rao	Indian National Congress
1985	Gouthu Syam Sunder Sivaji	Telugu Desam Party
1989	Gouthu Syam Sunder Sivaji	Telugu Desam Party
1994	Gouthu Syam Sunder Sivaji	Telugu Desam Party
1999	Gouthu Syam Sunder Sivaji	Telugu Desam Party
2004	Gouthu Syam Sunder Sivaji	Telugu Desam Party

== Election results ==
=== 1952 ===
1952 Madras Legislative Assembly election: Sompeta
Party	Candidate	Votes	%	±%
KLP	Gouthu Latchanna	13,341	33.89%	
INC	Pothuru Swamy Babu	8,424	21.40%	21.40%
Independent	Jagannatharajamani Raji Deo	8,071	20.51%	
CPI	Marpu Padmanabham	6,221	15.80%	
Independent	Sanapathi Krishnamurthy	3,304	8.39%	
Margin of victory		4,917	12.49%	
Turnout		39,361	58.17%	
Registered electors		67,670		
KLP win (new seat)				

== See also ==
- List of constituencies of Andhra Pradesh Legislative Assembly
