= Damodaram Sanjivayya =

Indian politician

Damodaram Sanjeevayya
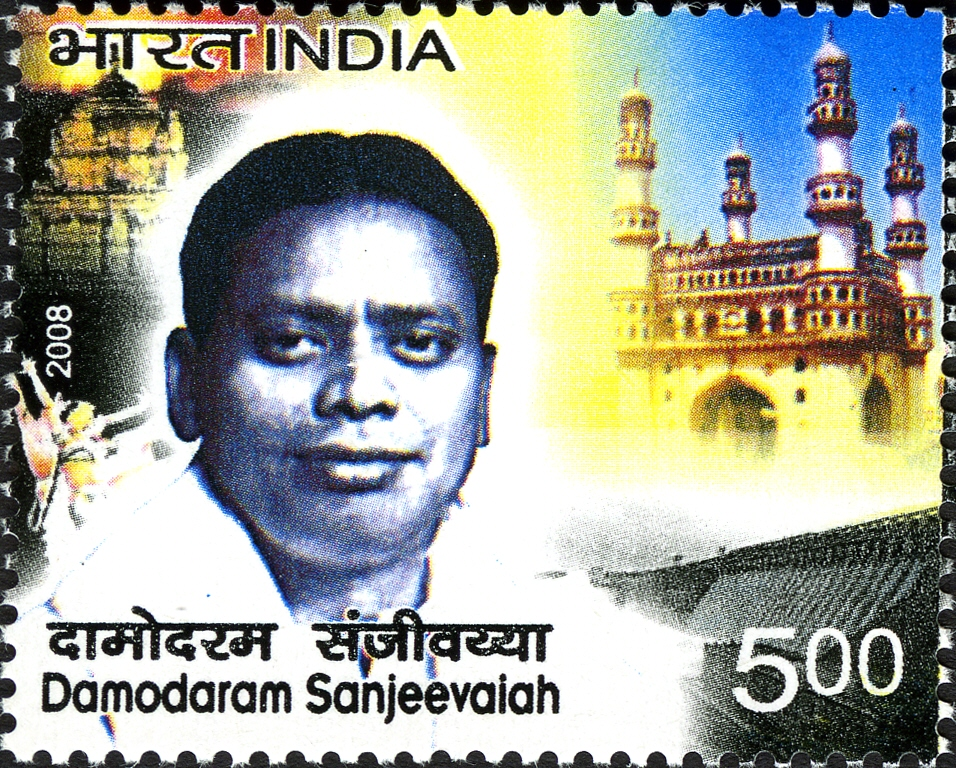

Union Minister of Labour and Employment
- In office 24 January 1964 – 24 January 1966
- Prime Minister: Jawaharlal Nehru; Lal Bahadur Shastri
- Preceded by: Gulzarilal Nanda
- Succeeded by: Jagjivan Ram

Member of Parliament, Rajya Sabha
- In office 1964–1972
- Preceded by: Narsing Rao
- Succeeded by: M Rahmatullah
- Constituency: Andhra Pradesh

2nd Chief Minister of Andhra Pradesh
- In office 11 January 1960 – 12 March 1962
- Governor: Bhim Sen Sachar
- Deputy: Konda Venkata Ranga Reddy
- Preceded by: Neelam Sanjiva Reddy
- Succeeded by: Neelam Sanjiva Reddy

3rd President of the Andhra Pradesh Congress Committee
- In office 1956–1961
- AICC President: U. N. Dhebar; Indira Gandhi; Neelam Sanjiva Reddy
- Preceded by: Bezawada Gopala Reddy
- Succeeded by: Mallipudi Pallamraju

Personal details
- Born: 14 February 1921 Peddapdu Village, Madras Presidency, British India (now in Andhra Pradesh, India)
- Died: 7 May 1972 (aged 51)
- Party: Indian National Congress
- Spouse: Krishnaveni
- Education: Madras Law College
- Cabinet: Government of India
- Portfolio: Minister of Labour and Employment (9 June 1964 – 23 January 1966)

Damodaram Sanjivayya (14 February 1921 – 7 May 1972) was an Indian politician who served as the second chief minister of Andhra Pradesh from 11 January 1960 to 12 March 1962. Sanjivayya was the first Dalit Chief Minister of an Indian state. He was also the first Dalit leader to become All India Congress Committee president.

== Early life ==
Damodaram Sanjivayya was born in a Mala Dasu family in Peddapadu village of Kallur Mandal in Kurnool district. His father died when he was young. He studied at the Municipal School and graduated with a Bachelor's degree in Law from Madras Law College in 1948. Even while a student, he actively participated in the Indian freedom movement.

== Career ==
Sanjivayya was a minister in the composite Madras State. He was a member of the provisional parliament 1950–52. In 1962, Sanjivayya also became the first Dalit leader from Andhra Pradesh to become Pradesh Congress Committee president.

He was Minister of Labour and Employment under Lal Bahadur Shastri between 9 June 1964 and 23 January 1966.

=== Chief Minister ===
Sanjivayya was the first Dalit Chief Minister of an Indian state. He wrote a book on labour problems and industrial development in India, which was published in 1970 by Oxford and IBH Pub. Co., New Delhi. He introduced pension system for widows, elderly people and established Lalitha Kala Academy in Andhra Pradesh. He was the youngest chief minister ever in India, he introduced the office of Anticorruption Bureau {ACB}, he completed the irrigation projects like Gajuladinne in Kurnool dist., Vamsadhara, Pulichintala and varadarajula swamy project near Atmakur in Kurnool dist.

== Personal life ==
In 1950 Sanjivayya married a Dalit teacher, Krishnaveni. They had no children. Sanjivayya wrote literary articles and poetry in Telugu in his free time.

== Honours ==
- His statue was erected opposite Public Gardens in Nampally, Hyderabad.
- A park, Sanjivayya park on the banks of Hussain Sagar in Hyderabad was named in his honour. His grave is also located inside the park.
- Damodaram Sanjivayya National Law University, Visakhapatnam one of the premier legal institutions in the country has been named in his honour.
- India Post issued a commemorative postage stamp in his honour (₹5.00) on 14 February 2008.

== See also ==
- List of chief ministers of Andhra Pradesh
