= Proddatur Assembly constituency =

Constituency of the Andhra Pradesh Legislative Assembly, India

Coordinates: 14.75°N 78.55°E

Proddatur
- Constituency No. 132 for the Andhra Pradesh Legislative Assembly
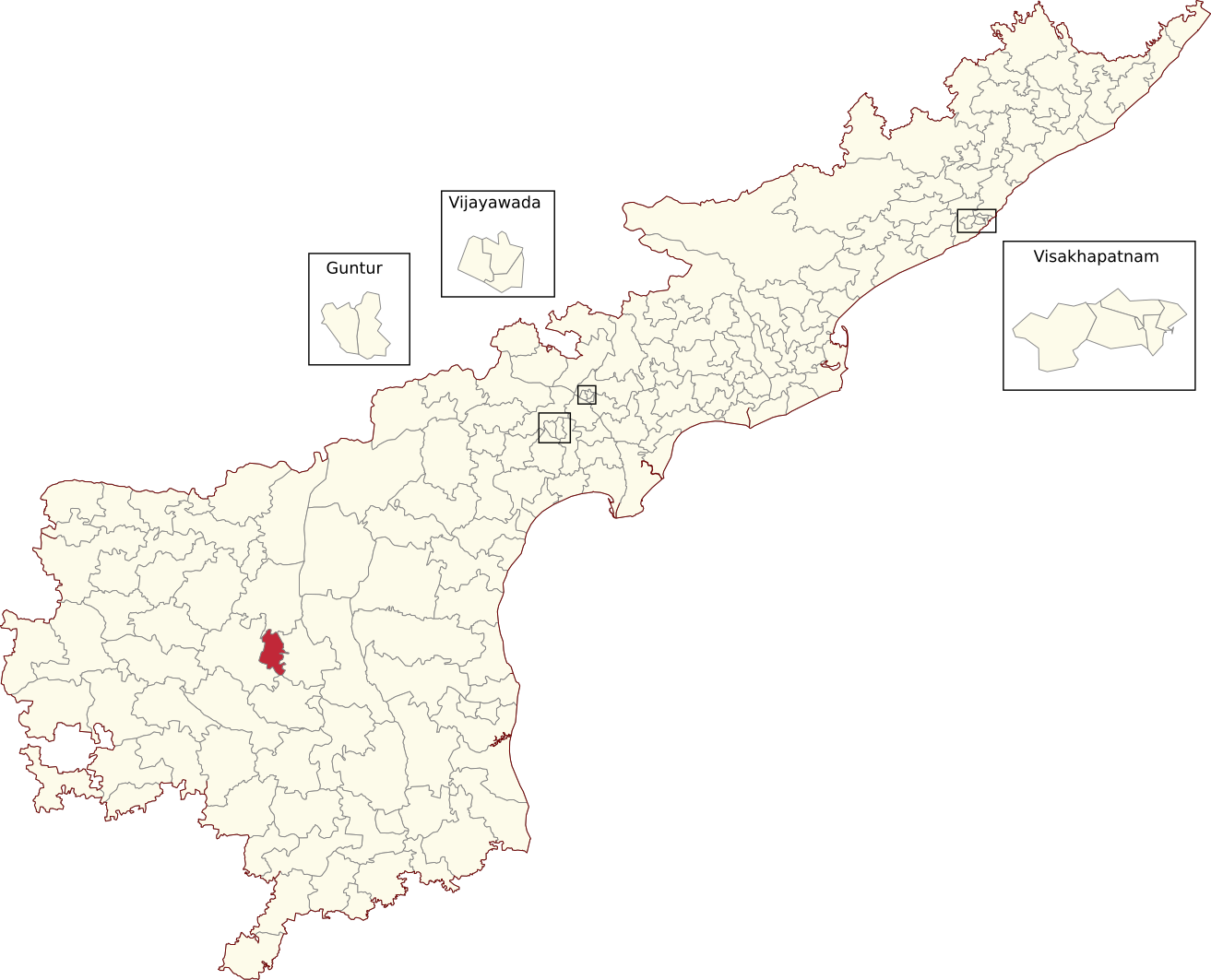
- Location of Proddatur Assembly constituency within Andhra Pradesh

Constituency details
- Country: India
- Region: South India
- State: Andhra Pradesh
- District: YSR Kadapa
- Lok Sabha constituency: Kadapa
- Established: 1951
- Total electors: 236,730
- Reservation: None

Member of Legislative Assembly
- 16th Andhra Pradesh Legislative Assembly
- Incumbent Nandyala Varada Rajulu Reddy
- Party: TDP
- Alliance: NDA
- Elected year: 2024

Proddatur Assembly constituency is a constituency in YSR Kadapa district of Andhra Pradesh that elects representatives to the Andhra Pradesh Legislative Assembly in India. It is one of the seven assembly segments of Kadapa Lok Sabha constituency.

Nandyala Varada Rajulu Reddy is the current MLA of the constituency, having won the 2024 Andhra Pradesh Legislative Assembly election from Telugu Desam Party. As of 25 March 2019, there are a total of 236,730 electors in the constituency. The constituency was established in 1951, as per the Delimitation Orders (1951).

== Overview ==
It is part of Kadapa Lok Sabha constituency along with another six Sasana Sabha segments, namely, Badvel, Kadapa, Pulivendla, Kamalapuram, Jammalamagudu and Mydukur in YSR Kadapa district.

== Mandals ==
Mandal
Rajupalem
Proddatur

== Members of the Legislative Assembly ==
Year	Member	Political party
1952	Kundala Balanarayana Reddy	Indian National Congress
1955	Kundala Balanarayana Reddy	Indian National Congress
1957^	Ramireddy Chandra Obul Reddy	Independent
1962	Panyam Yerra Muni Reddy	Independent
1967	Rama Subba Reddy Rajulapalle	Independent
1972	Kopparapu Subba Rao	Independent
1978	Ramireddy Chandra Obula Reddy	Independent
1983	Mallela Ramana Venkata Reddy	Telugu Desam Party
1985	Nandyala Varada Rajulu Reddy	Telugu Desam Party
1989	Nandyala Varada Rajulu Reddy	Indian National Congress
1994	Nandyala Varada Rajulu Reddy	Indian National Congress
1999	Nandyala Varada Rajulu Reddy	Indian National Congress
2004	Nandyala Varada Rajulu Reddy	Indian National Congress
2009	Mallela Linga Reddy	Telugu Desam Party
2014	Rachamallu Siva Prasad Reddy	YSR Congress Party
2019	Rachamallu Siva Prasad Reddy	YSR Congress Party
2024	Nandyala Varada Rajulu Reddy	Telugu Desam Party

== Election results ==
=== 1952 ===
1952 Madras Legislative Assembly election: Proddatur
Party	Candidate	Votes	%	±%
INC	Kundala Balanarayana Reddy	15,054	33.06%	33.06%
KMPP	Panem Yonamani Reddy	11,660	25.61%	
CPI	Ramireddy Chandra Obula Reddy	10,565	23.20%	
Socialist Party (India)	A. Subbarami Reddi	2,983	6.55%	
Independent	K. John	2,330	5.12%	
Independent	Vedantam Lakshmiah	2,020	4.44%	
Independent	Thallur Ethirajulu Naidu	923	2.03%	
Margin of victory		3,394	7.45%	
Turnout		45,535	66.80%	
Registered electors		68,162		
INC win (new seat)				

=== 1957 by-election ===
1957 Andhra Pradesh Legislative Assembly election: Proddatur
Party	Candidate	Votes	%	±%
Independent	Ramireddy Chandra Obula Reddy	28,083		
INC	P. Yerramynireddi	16,420		
Independent	T.H. Rao	1,618		
Margin of victory		11,663		
Turnout				
Independent gain from INC		Swing		

=== 2004 ===
2004 Andhra Pradesh Legislative Assembly election: Proddatur
Party	Candidate	Votes	%	±%
INC	Nandyala Varada Rajulu Reddy	54,419	39.62	+1.17
Independent	Mallela Linga Reddy	37,390	27.22	
BJP	Kovvuru Balachandra Reddy	22,118	16.10	
Majority		17,029	12.40	
Turnout		137,359	70.00	+8.25
INC hold		Swing		

=== 2009 ===
2009 Andhra Pradesh Legislative Assembly election: Proddatur
Party	Candidate	Votes	%	±%
TDP	Mallela Linga Reddy	73,023	46.45	
INC	Nandyala Varada Rajulu Reddy	56,867	36.18	
PRP	Mallela Muralidhar	22,784	14.49	
Majority		16,156	10.27	
Turnout		157,198	76.97	+6.97
TDP gain from INC		Swing		

=== 2014 ===
2014 Andhra Pradesh Legislative Assembly election: Proddatur
Party	Candidate	Votes	%	±%
YSRCP	Rachamallu Siva Prasad Reddy	93,866	51.40	
TDP	Nandyala Varada Rajulu Reddy	80,921	44 .32	
Majority		12,945	7.08	
Turnout		182,601	78.65	+1.68
YSRCP gain from TDP		Swing		

=== 2019 ===
2019 Andhra Pradesh Legislative Assembly election: Proddatur
Party	Candidate	Votes	%	±%
YSRCP	Rachamallu Siva Prasad Reddy	107,941	59.21	
TDP	Mallela Linga Reddy	64,793	35.54	
Majority		45,148	256.67	
Turnout		192,293	78.65	+1.68
YSRCP hold		Swing		

=== 2024 ===
2024 Andhra Pradesh Legislative Assembly election: Proddatur
Party	Candidate	Votes	%	±%
TDP	Nandyala Varada Rajulu Reddy	106,712	53.02	
YSRCP	Rachamallu Siva Prasad Reddy	83,968	41.72	
INC	Shaik Poola Mohammed Nazeer	6,016	2.99	
NOTA	None Of The Above	1,740	0.86	
Majority		22,744	11.29	
Turnout		2,01,284		
TDP gain from YSRCP		Swing		

== See also ==
- List of constituencies of Andhra Pradesh Legislative Assembly
