= YSR Telangana Party =

Defunct Indian political party

- Abbreviation: YSRTP
- Founder: Y. S. Sharmila
- Founded: 8 July 2021
- Dissolved: 4 January 2024
- Split from: Yuvajana Shramika Rythu Congress Party
- Merged into: Indian National Congress

Party flag

The YSR Telangana Party (transl. YSR Telangana Party; abbr. YSRTP) was a recognised Indian regional political party in the state of Telangana. It was founded by Y. S. Sharmila, the daughter of the former chief minister of Andhra Pradesh Y. S. Rajasekhara Reddy at Hyderabad on 8 July 2021.

YSRTP was formed due to a conflict of interest between Sharmila and her brother Y. S. Jagan Mohan Reddy. The YSRTP is led by its founder as president of the party. The headquarters of the party is located in Banjara Hills, Hyderabad.

The party initially planned to contest in the 2023 Telangana Legislative Assembly election, but later withdrew its decision, with the party president Sharmila extending her support to the Indian National Congress.

On 4 January 2024, the party was merged with Indian National Congress.

== Leadership ==
=== President ===
| No. | Portrait | Name (Birth–Death) | Term in office | | |
| No. | Portrait | Name (Birth–Death) | Assumed office | Left office | Time in office |
|---|---|---|---|---|---|
| 1 | | Y. S. Sharmila (1974–) | 8 July 2021 | 4 January 2024 | 2 years, 180 days |

=== Chairperson ===
| No. | Portrait | Name (Birth–Death) | Term in office | | |
| No. | Portrait | Name (Birth–Death) | Assumed office | Left office | Time in office |
|---|---|---|---|---|---|
| 1 | | Y. S. Vijayamma (1956–) | 8 May 2022 | 4 January 2024 | 1 year, 241 days |

== See also ==
- List of political parties in India
