= Kadapa Lok Sabha constituency =

Lok Sabha Constituency in Andhra Pradesh

Coordinates: 14.5°N 78.8°E

Kadapa
- Lok Sabha constituency
- Interactive Map Outlining Kadapa Lok Sabha constituency

Constituency details
- Country: India
- Region: South India
- State: Andhra Pradesh
- Assembly constituencies: Badvel; Kadapa; Pulivendla; Kamalapuram; Jammalamadugu; Proddatur; Mydukur
- Established: 1951
- Total electors: 16,06,127
- Reservation: None

Member of Parliament
- 18th Lok Sabha
- Incumbent Y. S. Avinash Reddy
- Party: YSRCP
- Alliance: None
- Elected year: 2024

Kadapa Lok Sabha constituency (formerly known as Cuddapah Lok Sabha constituency) is one of the twenty-five lok sabha constituencies of Andhra Pradesh in India. It comprises seven assembly segments and belongs to YSR Kadapa district.

== Assembly Segments ==
Kadapa Lok Sabha constituency comprises the following Legislative Assembly segments:

#	Name	District	Member	Party	Leading (in 2024)
124	Badvel (SC)	YSR Kadapa	Dasari Sudha	YSRCP	YSRCP
126	Kadapa	YSR Kadapa	Reddeppagari Madhavi Reddy	TDP	TDP
129	Pulivendla	YSR Kadapa	Y. S. Jagan Mohan Reddy	YSRCP	YSRCP
130	Kamalapuram	YSR Kadapa	Putha Krishna Chaitanya Reddy	TDP	TDP
131	Jammalamadugu	YSR Kadapa	Ch. Adinarayana Reddy	BJP	TDP
132	Proddatur	YSR Kadapa	Nandyala Varada Rajulu Reddy	TDP	TDP
133	Mydukur	YSR Kadapa	Putta Sudhakar Yadav	TDP	TDP

== Members of Parliament ==
Year	Member	Party
1952	Y. Eswara Reddy	Communist Party of India
1957	V. Rami Reddy	Indian National Congress
1962	Y. Eswara Reddy	Communist Party of India
1967	Y. Eswara Reddy	Communist Party of India
1971	Y. Eswara Reddy	Communist Party of India
1977	Kandula Obul Reddy	Indian National Congress
1980	Kandula Obul Reddy	Indian National Congress (I)
1984	D. Narayana Reddy	Telugu Desam Party
1989	Y. S. Rajasekhara Reddy	Indian National Congress
1991	Y. S. Rajasekhara Reddy	Indian National Congress
1996	Y. S. Rajasekhara Reddy	Indian National Congress
1998	Y. S. Rajasekhara Reddy	Indian National Congress
1999	Y. S. Vivekananda Reddy	Indian National Congress
2004	Y. S. Vivekananda Reddy	Indian National Congress
2009	Y. S. Jagan Mohan Reddy	Indian National Congress
2011^	Y. S. Jagan Mohan Reddy	YSR Congress Party
2014	Y. S. Avinash Reddy	YSR Congress Party
2019	Y. S. Avinash Reddy	YSR Congress Party
2024	Y. S. Avinash Reddy	YSR Congress Party

^By Poll

== Election results ==
Vote share of Winning candidates
2024	45.78%
2019	63.79%
2014	55.97%
2011 (By-Poll)	67.15%
2009	52.87%
2004	56.33%
1999	50.89%
1998	50.69%
1996	48.75%
1991	75.29%
1989	60.16%
1984	52.11%
1980	50.88%
1977	48.84%
1971	60.26%
1967	49.25%
1962	44.02%
1957	51.58%
1952	35.47%

=== 2024 ===
2024 Indian general elections: Kadapa
Party	Candidate	Votes	%	±%
YSRCP	Y. S. Avinash Reddy	605,143	45.78	▼18.01
TDP	Ch. Bhupesh Subbarami Reddy	5,42,448	41.03	▲8.24
INC	Y. S. Sharmila	1,41,039	10.67	▲9.97
NOTA	None of the Above	16,846	1.27	▲0.07
Majority		62,695	4.75	▼26.25
Total valid votes		13,21,975		
Turnout		13,27,619	80.89	
Registered electors		16,41,349		
YSRCP hold		Swing		

==== Legislative Assembly Constituency-wise Results 2024 ====
No.	Constituency	1st	Votes	2nd	Votes	3rd	Votes
124	Badvel (SC)	YSRCP	91,211	TDP	62,342	INC	10,552
126	Kadapa	TDP	66,090	YSRCP	62,015	INC	52,132
129	Pulivendula	YSRCP	1,08,134	TDP	47,757	INC	25,956
130	Kamalapuram	TDP	79,750	YSRCP	75,232	INC	12,080
131	Jammalamadugu	TDP	1,02,318	YSRCP	96,996	INC	6,079
132	Proddatur	TDP	90,964	YSRCP	83,233	INC	19,964
133	Mydukur	TDP	83,137	YSRCP	81,585	INC	9,632
Postal Ballot Papers		TDP	10,090	YSRCP	6,737	INC	4,644

=== 2019 ===
2019 Indian general election: Kadapa
Party	Candidate	Votes	%	±%
YSRCP	Y. S. Avinash Reddy	783,499	63.79	
TDP	Ch. Adinarayana Reddy	402,773	32.79	
NOTA	None of the above	14,692	1.20	
INC	Gundlakunta Sreeramulu	8,341	0.68	
CPI	Gujjula Eswaraiah	6,242	0.51	
BJP	Sri Rama Chandra Singareddy	4,085	0.33	
IND	5 Independent Candidates	5,085	0.41	
OTH	5 Other Party Candidates	3,525	0.29	
Majority		380,726	31.00	
Turnout		1,228,242	78.22	
YSRCP hold		Swing		

=== 2014 ===
2014 Indian general election: Kadapa
Party	Candidate	Votes	%	±%
YSRCP	Y. S. Avinash Reddy	671,983	55.97	
TDP	Srinivasa Reddy Reddeppagari	481,660	40.12	
INC	Ajaya Kumar Veena	14,319	1.19	
NOTA	None of the Above	6,058	0.50	
IND	Poreddy Prabhakara Reddy	1,217	0.10	
OTH	10 Other Party Candidates	25,425	2.12	
Majority		190,323	15.85	
Turnout		1,200,662	77.45	
YSRCP hold		Swing		

=== 2011 by-election ===
By-election: Kadapa
Party	Candidate	Votes	%	±%
YSRCP	Y. S. Jagan Mohan Reddy	692,251	67.15	
INC	D. L. Ravindra Reddy	146,579	14.22	
TDP	M. V. Mysura Reddy	129,565	12.57	
IND	34 Independent Candidates	46,640	4.52	
OTH	5 Other Party Candidates	15,938	1.55	
Majority		545,672	52.93	
Turnout		1,030,978	77.54	
Swing to YSRCP from INC		Swing		

=== 2009 ===
2009 Indian general election: Kadapa
Party	Candidate	Votes	%	±%
INC	Y. S. Jagan Mohan Reddy	542,611	52.87	
TDP	Palem Srikanth Reddy	363,765	35.44	
PRP	Dr. Khaleel Basha	63,309	6.17	
BSP	Jambapuram Muni Reddy	10,761	1.05	
BJP	Vangala Shashi Bhushan Reddy	7,171	0.70	
IND	7 Independent Candidates	22,033	2.15	
OTH	8 Other Party Candidates	16,635	1.62	
Majority		178,846	17.43	
Turnout		1,026,285	76.15	
INC hold		Swing		

=== 2004 ===
2004 Indian general election: Cuddapah
Party	Candidate	Votes	%	±%
INC	Y. S. Vivekananda Reddy	461,431	56.33	
TDP	M. V. Mysura Reddy	329,757	40.25	
IND	4 Independent Candidates	16,043	1.96	
OTH	9 Other Party Candidates	11,970	1.46	
Majority		131,674	16.08	
Turnout		819,201	71.65	
INC hold		Swing		

=== 1999 ===
1999 Indian general election: Cuddapah
Party	Candidate	Votes	%	±%
INC	Y. S. Vivekananda Reddy	367,833	50.89	
TDP	Kandula Rajamohan Reddy	341,236	47.21	
NCP	Nandyala Raghava Reddy	961	0.13	
NTRTDP(LP)	Adinarayana Reddy Chadipirala	823	0.11	
IND	7 Independent Candidates	12,001	1.67	
Majority		26,597	3.68	
Turnout		739,109	67.77	
INC hold		Swing		

=== 1998 ===
1998 Indian general election: Cuddapah
Party	Candidate	Votes	%	±%
INC	Y. S. Rajasekhara Reddy	374,762	50.69	
TDP	Kandula Rajamohana Reddy	320,881	43.40	
BJP	Nagendra Prasad Kadiri	28,349	3.83	
IND	10 Independent Candidates	13,798	1.86	
OTH	2 Other Party Candidates	1,490	0.20	
Majority		53,881	7.29	
Turnout		750,722	67.79	
INC hold		Swing		

=== 1996 ===
1996 Indian general election: Cuddapah
Party	Candidate	Votes	%	±%
INC	Y. S. Rajasekhara Reddy	368,611	48.75	
TDP	Kandula Raja Mohana Reddy	363,166	48.03	
NTRTDP(LP)	Ahmed Hussain	6,328	0.84	
BJP	M. Lakshmi Narasaiah	4,783	0.63	
JP	Adi Narayana Reddy Chadipiralla	1,493	0.20	
IND	24 Independent Candidates	11,698	1.57	
Majority		5,445	0.72	
Turnout		767,958	66.62	
INC hold		Swing		

=== 1991 ===
1991 Indian general election: Cuddapah
Party	Candidate	Votes	%	±%
INC	Y. S. Rajasekhara Reddy	583,953	75.29	
TDP	C. Ramachandraiah	165,028	21.28	
BJP	Gouru Pulla Reddy	16,785	2.16	
IND	29 Independent Candidates	9,810	1.26	
Majority		418,925	54.01	
Turnout		782,760	68.75	
INC hold		Swing		

=== 1989 ===
1989 Indian general election: Cuddapah
Party	Candidate	Votes	%	±%
INC	Y. S. Rajasekhara Reddy	480,524	60.16	
TDP	M. V. Ramana Reddy	313,772	39.28	
IND	Chimikala Rama Krishna Reddy	2,263	0.28	
IND	Lomada Vasudeva Reddy	2,181	0.27	
Majority		166,752	20.88	
Turnout		819,354	72.17	
Swing to INC from TDP		Swing		

=== 1984 ===
1984 Indian general election: Cuddapah
Party	Candidate	Votes	%	±%
TDP	D. N. Reddy	332,915	52.11	
INC	Obula Reddy Kandula	278,607	43.61	
IND	12 Independent Candidates	27,344	4.29	
Majority		54,308	8.50	
Turnout		649,290	72.89	
Swing to TDP from INC(I)		Swing		

=== 1980 ===
1980 Indian general election: Cuddapah
Party	Candidate	Votes	%	±%
INC(I)	K. Obul Reddy	256,204	50.88	
JP	P. V. S. Murthy	205,658	40.85	
JP(S)	P. Raghunatha Reddy	25,415	5.05	
IND	Matcha Chinna Narayana	6,020	1.20	
IND	Nadendla Baba Saheb	4,269	0.85	
IND	Chidella Krishnaiah	3,965	0.79	
IND	M. Venkataramana	1,966	0.39	
Majority		50,546	10.03	
Turnout		512,879	66.21	
Swing to INC(I) from INC		Swing		

=== 1977 ===
1977 Indian general election: Cuddapah
Party	Candidate	Votes	%	±%
INC	Kandala Obul Reddy	232,351	48.84	
JP	Vutukuru Rami Reddy	224,789	47.25	
CPI	Y. Eswara Reddy	15,794	3.32	
IND	Polanki Venkata Subbaiah	2,827	0.59	
Majority		7,562	1.59	
Turnout		487,025	69.70	
Swing to INC from CPI		Swing		

=== 1971 ===
1971 Indian general election: Cuddapah
Party	Candidate	Votes	%	±%
CPI	Y. Eswara Reddy	200,713	60.26	
INC(O)	Vutukuru Rami Reddy	107,099	32.16	
MLP (Note: Minorities Labour Party)	Balireddy Lingala	17,353	5.21	
IND	G. Rama Sastry	2,168	0.65	
IND	Mahammad Baig	2,085	0.63	
IND	Thirumalla Kodandaramaiah	1,916	0.58	
IND	Poondla Ananda Samuel	1,734	0.52	
Majority		93,614	28.10	
Turnout		339,165	58.78	
CPI hold		Swing		

=== 1967 ===
1967 Indian general election: Cuddapah
Party	Candidate	Votes	%	±%
CPI	Y. E. Reddy	191,736	49.25	
INC	K. Ramasubbamma	154,017	39.56	
IND	P. Ramireddy	43,549	11.19	
Majority		37,719	9.69	
Turnout		402,943	76.44	
CPI hold		Swing		

=== 1962 ===
1962 Indian general election: Cuddapah
Party	Candidate	Votes	%	±%
CPI	Yeddula Eswara Reddy	158,877	44.02	
INC	Vuntukuru Rami Reddy	138,010	38.23	
SWA	Naru Ranga Reddy	48,325	13.39	
IND	Syed Abdu Sattar	15,743	4.36	
Majority		20,867	5.79	
Turnout		371,945	74.81	
Swing to CPI from INC		Swing		

=== 1957 ===
1957 Indian general election: Cuddapah
Party	Candidate	Votes	%	±%
INC	V. Rami Reddy	101,909	51.58	
CPI	Yeddula Eswara Reddy	95,653	48.42	
Majority		6,256	3.16	
Turnout		197,562	43.32	
Swing to INC from CPI		Swing		

=== 1952 ===
1952 Indian general election: Cuddapah
Party	Candidate	Votes	%	±%
CPI	Eswara Reddi Yeddula	85,125	35.47	
INC	P. Basi Reddy	66,658	27.78	
KMPP	Ramasastri Bhaskara	29,833	12.43	
IND	Raja Sekhara Reddy	21,883	9.12	
IND	Chinna Subhaiah Nanu Bala	17,640	7.35	
IND	R. V. S. Sriramulu	10,165	4.24	
IND	S. Sanjeeva Reddi	8,678	3.62	
Majority		18,467	7.70	
Turnout		239,982	65.20	
CPI win (new seat)				

== See also ==
- List of constituencies of the Andhra Pradesh Legislative Assembly
