= Y. S. Vivekananda Reddy =

Indian politician (1950–2019)

Member of Parliament, Lok Sabha
- In office 6 October 1999 — 18 May 2009
- Preceded by: Y. S. Raja Shekhar Reddy
- Succeeded by: Y. S. Jaganmohan Reddy
- Constituency: Kadapa

Member of Legislative Assembly, Andhra Pradesh
- In office 1989–1999
- Preceded by: Y. S. Raja Shekhar Reddy
- Succeeded by: Y. S. Raja Shekhar Reddy
- Constituency: Pulivendla

Personal details
- Born: 8 August 1951 Pulivendula, Madras State (now in Andhra Pradesh, India)
- Died: 15 March 2019 (aged 67) Pulivendula, Kadapa, Andhra Pradesh, India
- Cause of death: Stabbed to death, Murder
- Party: YSR Congress Party
- Other political affiliations: Indian National Congress
- Relations: Y. S. Raja Shekhar Reddy (Elder brother); Y. S. Vijayamma (sister in law); Y. S. Jagan Mohan Reddy (Nephew); Y. S. Sharmila (Niece)
- Parent: Y. S. Raja Reddy (father)
- As of 16 September, 2006 Source: [Bio data]

Yeduguri Sandinti Vivekananda Reddy (8 August 1951 – 15 March 2019) was a member of the 14th Lok Sabha of India. He represented the Kadapa constituency of Andhra Pradesh. He was a member of the Indian National Congress. He was brutally hacked to death with an axe at his residence in Pulivendula, Kadapa district on 15 March 2019.

== Personal life ==
Being born into a middle-class family on 8 August 1951 to Y. S. Raja Reddy and Y. S. Jayamma, Vivekananda Reddy was the younger brother of the former Chief Minister of Andhra Pradesh Y. S. Rajasekhara Reddy. He was a graduate in agriculture from S. V. Agricultural College in Tirupati. He has one daughter.

== Political career ==
Vivekananda Reddy was the designer of Lingala Canal in Kadapa district. He began his services to the community through the Lions Club, became its district governor and the Samithi president.

He was twice elected as a Member of the Legislative Assembly for the Pulivendula constituency, in 1989 and 1994. Then, in the elections of 1999, he was elected to the Lok Sabha from the Kadapa constituency with a majority of over 26,000 votes. In 2004 elections he increased that majority to over 130,000 votes.

In September 2009, he was elected as a member of the Andhra Pradesh Legislative Council. On 30 November 2010, he became Agriculture Minister in the Andhra Pradesh cabinet headed by N. Kiran Kumar Reddy.

Later, in 2011, he contested the Pulivendula by-elections caused due to Jaganmohan Reddy and his mother, Y. S. Vijayamma, leaving the Congress party to form YSR Congress Party. He stood as the Congress candidate against his sister-in-law and just managed to secure his deposit after finishing in second place but some 80,000 votes behind Y. S. Vijayamma.

He was found dead at his residence in Pulivendula on 15 March 2019. His party YSRCP demanded a CBI probe for investigation.

== Murder ==
As per post-mortem reports, Vivekananda Reddy has been brutally murdered and found at his residence in Kadapa on 15 March 2019. The death was first reported as a heart attack but later found to be a murder which led to further suspicion. The murder took place few weeks before the 2019 Andhra Pradesh Legislative Assembly Elections. As per the coroner's report, seven stab wounds were found on his body made by a sharp object.

According to reports, he was alone at his residence in Pulivendula the night before his murder. Two days earlier, he was seen at Jaganmohan Reddy's residence at Hyderabad. YSRCP expressed distrust of the Special Investigation Team (SIT) formed by the TDP government and demanded a CBI investigation into the murder.

A prime suspect, Srinivasulu Reddy, killed himself by taking sleeping pills. Reportedly, in a suicide note, he alleged he was harassed by the police with false allegations. Another suspect, Parameswara Reddy, an old friend of Vivekananda Reddy, has claimed he was victimised and harassed in the name of the probe.

Jaganmohan Reddy petitioned the High court seeking a CBI inquiry into his uncle's murder. After a change of government, in May 2019 he constituted a new SIT of the state police to probe the murder and tried to withdraw his petition in the court demanding CBI probe.

In January 2020, his daughter filed a writ petition in High Court seeking a CBI investigation and expressed doubts over the investigation by SIT. She alleged suspicion of Y. S. Avinash Reddy who was one of the first to arrive at the murder scene.

In March 2020, the High Court expressed dissatisfaction over the lack of progress in the investigation by the state police as the murder completed a year. The court ordered CBI to begin the investigation and complete at the earliest. In June 2021, CBI resumed the investigation which was put on hold due to the COVID-19 pandemic in India.

In February 2023, CBI mentioned that Y. S. Avinash Reddy tried to conceal the design of the murder by creating a false theory of heart attack in the counter affidavit filed in the Telangana High court.

In March 2023, the Supreme Court of India expressed dissatisfaction on the status report submitted by the CBI by stating that the process of investigation is hindered and delayed allowing the original culprits to escape. The court directed the CBI to replace the investigation officer to speed up the investigation by setting up a new SIT of 6 members and a deadline to conclude the investigation by 30 April 2023. Later again the Supreme Court of India has extended the deadline till 30 June 2023. There was a hearing of the Supreme court on the case on 22 April 2024.

== In popular culture ==
In 2024, Reddy was portrayed in the film Vivekam.

Hathya, a Telugu movie loosely based on his murder mystery investigation, was released in 2025.
