= Y. S. Vijayamma =

Indian politician (born 1956)

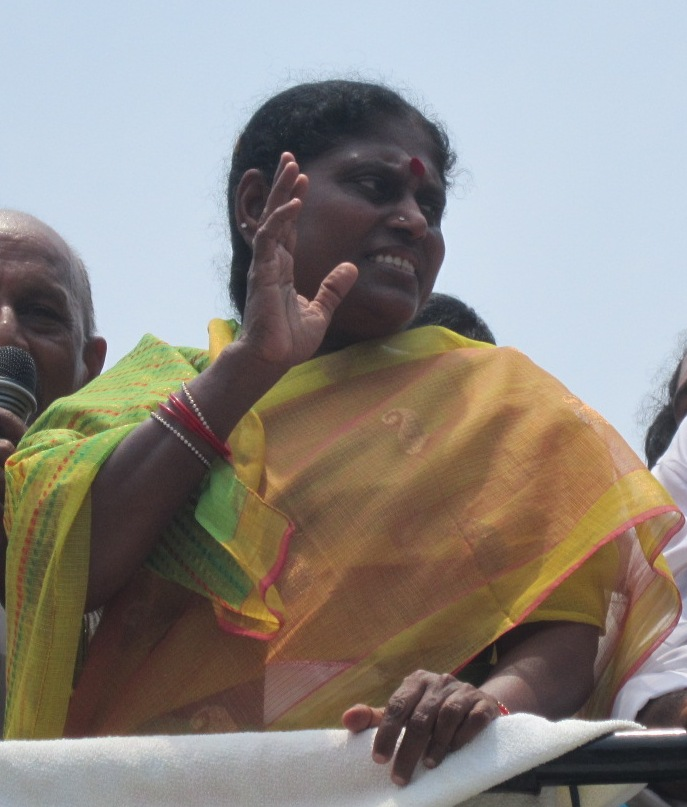

Chairperson of YSR Congress Party
- In office 12 March 2011 – 8 July 2022
- President: Y. S. Jagan Mohan Reddy
- Preceded by: Office established
- Succeeded by: Office abolished

Member of Andhra Legislative Assembly
- In office 13 May 2011 – 23 May 2014
- Preceded by: Y. S. Rajasekhara Reddy
- Succeeded by: Y. S. Jaganmohan Reddy
- Constituency: Pulivendla

Personal details
- Born: 19 April 1956 (age 70) Balapanuru, YSR Kadapa District, Andhra State, (present-day Andhra Pradesh) India
- Party: YSR Congress Party (2011–2022)
- Other political affiliations: YSR Telangana Party (2022–2024); Indian National Congress (until 2011)
- Spouse: Y. S. Rajashekhara Reddy (m. 1971–2009)
- Children: Y. S. Jaganmohan Reddy (son); Y. S. Sharmila (daughter)
- Relatives: Y. S. Vivekananda Reddy (brother in law); Y. S. Raja Reddy (father-in-law)

Yeduguri Sandinti Vijayalakshmi (born 19 April 1956), better known as Y. S. Vijayamma, is an Indian politician from the Rayalaseema region of Andhra Pradesh. She served as an MLA representing Pulivendla constituency. She was the chairperson of the YSR Congress Party as previously 2011 to 2022. Her husband, Y. S. Rajashekhara Reddy, popularly known as YSR,14th Chief Minister of Andhra Pradesh. Her son Y. S. Jaganmohan Reddy, who served as the 17th Chief Minister of Andhra Pradesh . Her daughter, Y. S. Sharmila is a politician from the Indian National Congress.

== Early life ==
She was born to Pochamreddy Ramanjula Reddy and Tulasamma in the village of Chimalavagula Palli, Tadipatri Taluk. She married Reddy while he pursued his medical career. The couple has two children, Jaganmohan Reddy and Sharmila.

== Career ==
She was elected to the Andhra Pradesh Legislative Assembly as an unopposed Indian National Congress candidate in the by-election held to the Pulivendula constituency in December 2009 to fill the vacancy caused by her husband's death. She lost the LS election for the Visakhapatnam seat in 2014.

The humiliation meted out to the YSR family by the Congress high command provoked the family member Y. S. Vivekananda Reddy, against Y. S. Jagan Mohan Reddy is threatening him politically. YS Vijaya quit the Congress party and assembly membership along with her son, who also quit both the party and his MP seat on 29 November 2010.

Vijayalakshmi and her son Y. S. Jagan Mohan Reddy was again elected to the assembly and Lok Sabha respectively in the by-elections held on 8 May 2011. Both of them fought the by-elections on behalf of the fledgling YSR Congress Party, founded by her son on 12 March 2011.

In the by-polls to the Kadapa Lok Sabha and Pulivendula assembly seats, Jagan Mohan Reddy and Vijayalakshmi retained the seats respectively, but as YSRCP candidates with record majorities. Jagan Mohan Reddy won the Kadapa seat with a record majority of 543,053 votes, while YS Vijaya won the Pulivendula seat with a record margin of 85,191 votes.

Later, by undertaking the poll campaign along with her daughter Y. S. Sharmila Reddy, YS Vijaya guided the YSR Congress Party to an unprecedented victory in the June 2012 by-polls in which their party won 15 of the 18 assembly seats for which the polls were held in the absence of her son Y. S. Jagan Mohan Reddy.

== Political agitation ==
Vijayalakshmi went on repeated hunger strikes, protesting various policies such as a power tariff hike and the Government's reluctance to release funds towards fee reimbursement of college students. She participated in agitations on several occasions fighting on behalf of farmers and women and seeking justice on many an issue including Samaikyandhra agitation with an indefinite fast demanding the Government of India to keep Andhra Pradesh united.
