= Y. S. Avinash Reddy =

Member of the 16th Lok Sabha

Member of Parliament, Lok Sabha
- Incumbent
- Assumed office 23 May 2019
- Preceded by: (Vacant); Resigned Himself for Special Status
- Constituency: Kadapa
- In office 16 May 2014 – 20 June 2018
- Preceded by: Y. S. Jaganmohan Reddy
- Succeeded by: Resigned Himself for Special Status (Vacant)
- Constituency: Kadapa

Personal details
- Born: 27 August 1984 (age 42) Pulivendula, Kadapa, Andhra Pradesh
- Party: YSR Congress Party
- Spouse: Y. S. Samatha
- Children: 2
- Relatives: Y. S. Jagan Mohan Reddy (cousin); Y. S. Sharmila (cousin); Y. S. Rajasekhara Reddy (uncle)
- Education: St. Joseph's College of Engineering (B.Tech), University of Worcester (M.B.A.)
- As of 7 December, 2016

Yeduguri Sandinti Avinash Reddy, popularly known as Y. S. Avinash Reddy, is an Indian politician who is the Member of Parliament in 16th Lok Sabha and 17th Lok Sabha from Kadapa (Lok Sabha constituency), Andhra Pradesh. He won the Indian general elections of 2014, 2019 and 2024 being a YSR Congress Party candidate.

== Political career ==
In April 2018, he along with his party MPs resigned their posts in protest for not giving special status to Andhra Pradesh and issued a no-confidence notice on the government.

=== General Elections 2014 ===
General Election, 2014: Kadapa
Party	Candidate	Votes	%	±%
YSRCP	Avinash Reddy	671,983	55.95	−11.20
TDP	Reddeppagari Srinivasa Reddy	481,660	40.10	+27.53
INC	Ajaya Kumar Veena	14,319	1.19	−13.03
BSP	Malikireddy Hanumantha Reddy	5,515	0.46	N/A
JD(U)	Yellipalem Ramesh Reddy	3,809	0.32	N/A
NOTA	None of the Above	6,058	0.50	N/A
Majority		190,323	15.85	−44.74
Turnout		1,200,662	77.45	−0.08
YSRCP hold		Swing	-11.20	

=== General Elections 2019 ===
2019 Indian general elections: Kadapa
Party	Candidate	Votes	%	±%
YSRCP	Y. S. Avinash Reddy	783,499	63.79	+7.84
TDP	C Adinarayana Reddy	402,773	32.79	−7.31
NOTA	None of the Above	14,692	1.2	
Majority		380,726	31.00	
Turnout		1,235,987	78.68	
YSRCP hold		Swing	+8.00	

=== General Elections 2024 ===
2024 Indian general elections: Kadapa
Party	Candidate	Votes	%	±%
YSRCP	Y. S. Avinash Reddy	605,143	45.78	−18.01
TDP	C. Bhupesh Subbarami Reddy	542,448	41.03	+8.24
INC	Y. S. Sharmila	141,039	10.67	+9.97
NOTA	None of the Above	16,846	1.27	
Majority		62,695	4.75	
Turnout		1,321,975	79.57	+0.89
YSRCP hold		Swing		

== Criminal conspiracy in the murder of Y. S. Vivekananda Reddy ==
Avinash Reddy was summoned by the Central Bureau of Investigation (CBI) on criminal conspiracy related to the murder of Y. S. Vivekananda Reddy, who was murdered and found at his residence in Kadapa on 15 March 2019. The death was first reported as a heart attack but later found to be a murder which led to further suspicion. The murder took place few weeks before the 2019 Andhra Pradesh General Elections. Along with his father Bhaskar Reddy, Avinash Reddy has been accused of conspiracy in the murder of Bhasker Reddy's cousin Vivekananda Reddy, based on a list of suspects submitted by the victim’s daughter Suneetha Nareddy. The CBI has sent a notice to Avinash Reddy to attend the inquiry on 19 May 2023.
