= Pochimareddy Ravindranath Reddy =

Indian politician

Member of Legislative Assembly, Andhra Pradesh
- In office 2014–2024
- Preceded by: Gandluru Veera Siva Reddy
- Succeeded by: Putha Krishna Chaitanya Reddy
- Constituency: Kamalapuram

Mayor of Kadapa Municipal Corporation
- In office 2005–2010
- Preceded by: Office established
- Succeeded by: Kothamaddi Suresh Babu

Personal details
- Political party: YSR Congress Party

Pochimareddy Ravindranath Reddy (born 1960) is an Indian politician from Andhra Pradesh. He is an MLA of YSR Congress Party from Kamalapuram Assembly constituency in the erstwhile Kadapa district. He won the 2019 Andhra Pradesh Legislative Assembly election.

== Early life and education ==
Reddy was born in Kadapa. He completed his B.Com. in Kadapa. His father is Ramanjula Reddy.

== Career ==
Reddy started his political career with YSR Congress Party and served as vice chairman of Zilla Parishad in Kadapa. He was also the Mayor of the Municipal Corporation of Kadapa. He was first elected as MLA winning the 2014 Andhra Pradesh Legislative Assembly election on YSRCP ticket from Kamalapuram Assembly constituency defeating Putha Narasimha Reddy of Telugu Desam Party by a margin of 5,345 votes. He retained his seat from the same constituency in the 2019 Andhra Pradesh Legislative Assembly election when he defeated TDP's Putha Narasimha Reddy again, by a bigger margin of 27,333 votes. In September 2016, he was nominated as the president of the YSRC RTC Mazdoor Union.
