= Rachamallu Siva Prasad Reddy =

Indian politician

Rachamallu Siva Prasad Reddy (born 1967) is an Indian politician from Andhra Pradesh. He is an MLA of YSR Congress Party from Proddatur Assembly constituency in Kadapa district. He won the 2019 Andhra Pradesh Legislative Assembly election.

== Early life and education ==
Reddy was born in Rameswaram village, Proddatur Town, YSR district, Andhra Pradesh. His late father Siva Sankar Reddy was a farmer. He completed his B.A. from SCNR Government Degree College, Proddatur University in 1987. He was a trade union leader, and was heading the Auto union before he entered politics. He has a daughter, Pallavi. He was hailed for performing an inter-caste marriage for her daughter with Pavan, an MBA graduate.

== Career ==
Reddy started his political career in 1986 as a student leader. He was the chairman of the Student Union in college before becoming a municipal Councillor of Proddutur municipality in 1998. He also served as Municipal Chairman for six months. He first became an MLA in 2014, when he represented YSR Congress Party from Proddutur Assembly constituency, defeating Nandyala Varada Rajulu Reddy of Telugu Desam Party by a margin of 12,945 votes. He won again in the 2019 Andhra Pradesh Legislative Assembly election defeating Mallela Linga Reddy of TDP by 43,148 votes. He was nominated again to contest the 2024 Assembly election and in March 2024 he was stopped by the election commission officials from campaigning, as he had not applied for permission through the Suvidha app.
