= Nandyala Varada Rajulu Reddy =

Indian politician

Member of Legislative Assembly Andhra Pradesh
- Incumbent
- Assumed office 2024
- Preceded by: Rachamallu Siva Prasad Reddy
- Constituency: Proddatur
- In office 1983–2009
- Preceded by: Mallela Venkata Ramana Reddy
- Succeeded by: Mallela Linga Reddy
- Constituency: Proddatur

Personal details
- Born: 12 November 1942 (age 83) Proddatur, Kadapa
- Party: Telugu Desam Party
- Occupation: Ex-MLA, Indian National Congress

Nandyala Varada Rajulu Reddy (born 12 November 1942) is an Indian politician from Andhra Pradesh. He is the MLA of Proddatur in Kadapa district from Telugu Desam Party. He won as MLA for Proddatur Assembly Constituency five times in a row from 1985 election to 2004 election. In 2009 Assembly election, he was defeated by Mallela Linga Reddy but he regained the seat on Telugu Desam Party ticket in the 2024 Andhra Pradesh Legislative Assembly election. He is the oldest candidate in fray in the 2024 Assembly election.

== Early life and education ==
Reddy was born in Nandyala to Nandyala Pedda Varada Reddy and Nandyala Sumitramma. He studied only till Class 10 at ABMH school. He served in the Revenue department for 18 years.

== Career ==
Reddy began his political journey in 1981 when he lost as Samithi president to Settipalli Raghurami Reddy. Later, he contested as an independent in the 1983 election but lost to TDP candidate M. V. Ramana Reddy.

He first won as an MLA on Telugu Desam Party ticket in the 1985 Andhra Pradesh Legislative Assembly election and defeated Ramana Reddy, who contested on Rayalaseema Vimchana Samithi this time around. Later, he switched to Indian National Congress and won the Proddatur seat for four consecutive times. He won in 1989, 1994, 1999 and 2004. In 2009, he lost on Indian National Congress ticket to Mallela Linga Reddy, and later shifted back to TDP as he opposed bifurcation of the state.

However, he lost the 2014 election on TDP ticket. He regained the seat winning the 2024 Andhra Pradesh Legislative Assembly election from Proddatur representing Telugu Desam Party. He polled 1,06,712 votes and defeated his nearest rival Rachamallu Siva Prasad Reddy of YSR Congress Party by a margin of 22,744 votes.

== Member of Legislative Assembly ==
Year	Member	Political party
1985	Nandyala Varada Rajulu Reddy	Telugu Desam Party
1989	Nandyala Varada Rajulu Reddy	Indian National Congress
1994	Nandyala Varada Rajulu Reddy	Indian National Congress
1999	Nandyala Varada Rajulu Reddy	Indian National Congress
2004	Nandyala Varada Rajulu Reddy	Indian National Congress
2024	Nandyala Varada Rajulu Reddy	Telugu Desam Party
