= Kamalapuram Assembly constituency =

Coordinates: 14.60°N 78.67°E

Kamalapuram
- Constituency No. 130 for the Andhra Pradesh Legislative Assembly
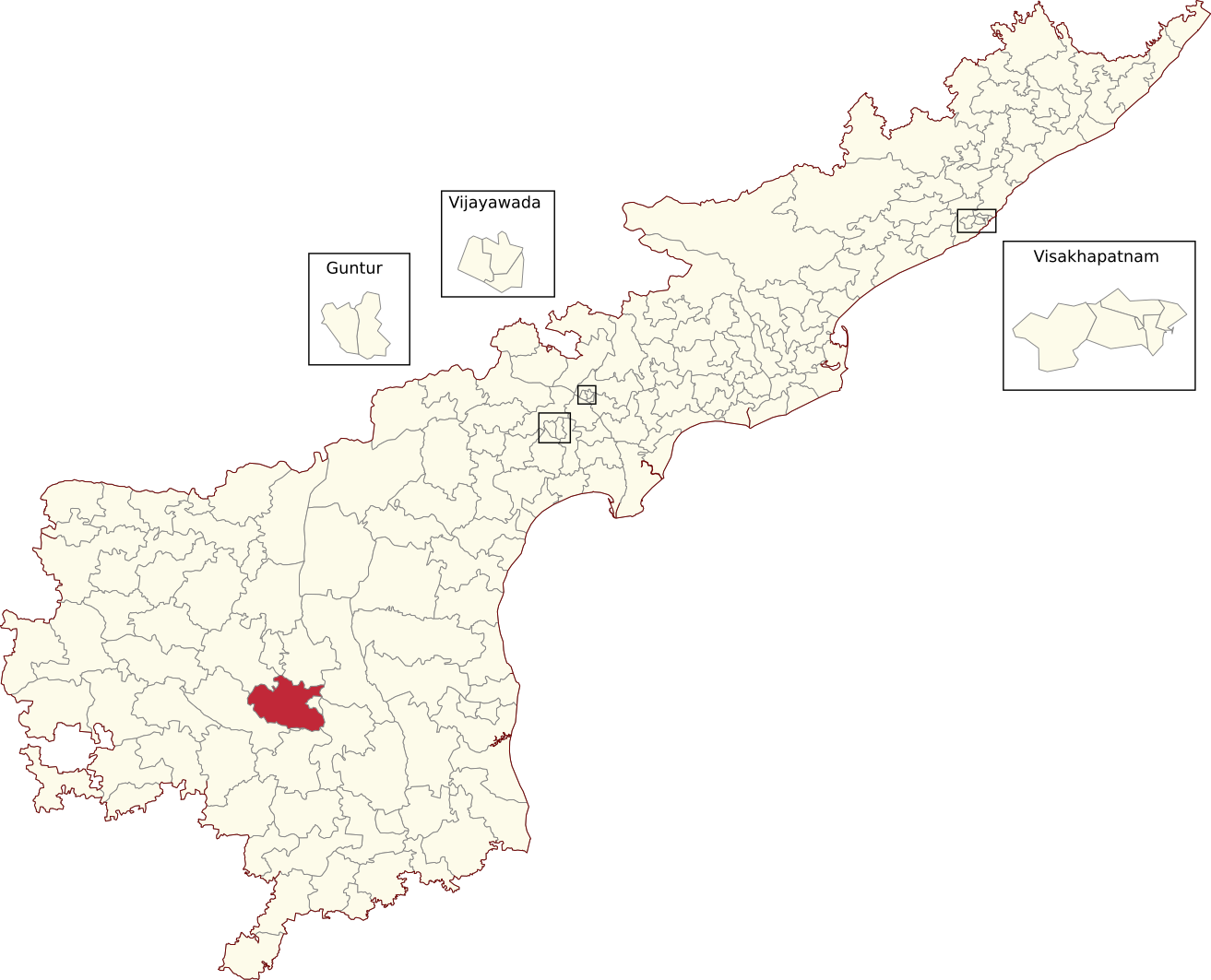
- Location of Kamalapuram Assembly constituency within Andhra Pradesh

Constituency details
- Country: India
- Region: South India
- State: Andhra Pradesh
- District: YSR Kadapa
- Lok Sabha constituency: Kadapa
- Established: 1951
- Total electors: 192,941
- Reservation: None

Member of Legislative Assembly
- 16th Andhra Pradesh Legislative Assembly
- Incumbent Putha Krishna Chaitanya Reddy
- Party: TDP
- Alliance: NDA
- Elected year: 2024

Kamalapuram Assembly constituency is a constituency in YSR Kadapa district of Andhra Pradesh that elects representatives to the Andhra Pradesh Legislative Assembly in India. It is one of the seven assembly segments of Kadapa Lok Sabha constituency.

Putha Krishna Chaitanya Reddy is the current MLA of the constituency, having won the 2024 Andhra Pradesh Legislative Assembly election from Telugu Desam Party. The constituency was established in 1951, as per the Delimitation Orders (1951).

== Mandals ==
Mandal
Pendlimarri
Chinthakommadinne
Kamalapuram
Vallur
Chennur
Veerapunayunipalle

Mandals in Kamalapuram Assembly Constituency

== Members of the Legislative Assembly ==
Year	Member	Political party
1952	Narreddi Sivarami Reddy	Communist Party of India
1955	Narreddi Sambhu Reddy	Indian National Congress
1962	Vaddamani Venkata Reddy	Indian National Congress
1967	N. Pulla Reddy	Independent
1972	Ranuva Seetha Ramiah	Indian National Congress
1978	Perla Siva Reddy	Independent
1983	Vaddamani Venkata Reddy	Telugu Desam Party
1985	M. V. Mysura Reddy	Indian National Congress
1989	M. V. Mysura Reddy	Indian National Congress
1994	Gandluru Veera Siva Reddy	Telugu Desam Party
1999	M. V. Mysura Reddy	Indian National Congress
2004	Gandluru Veera Siva Reddy	Telugu Desam Party
2009	Gandluru Veera Siva Reddy	Indian National Congress
2014	Pochimareddy Ravindranath Reddy	YSR Congress Party
2019	Pochimareddy Ravindranath Reddy	YSR Congress Party
2024	Putha Krishna Chaitanya Reddy	Telugu Desam Party

== Election results ==
=== 1952 ===
1952 Madras Legislative Assembly election: Kamalupuram
Party	Candidate	Votes	%	±%
CPI	Narreddi Sivarami Reddi	24,787	51.14%	
INC	Ramalinga Reddi	19,785	40.82%	40.82%
Independent	Gangi Reddi	3,893	8.03%	
Margin of victory		5,002	10.32%	
Turnout		48,465	65.23%	
Registered electors		74,303		
CPI win (new seat)				

=== 1999 ===
1999 Andhra Pradesh Legislative Assembly election: Kamalapuram
Party	Candidate	Votes	%	±%
INC	Venkata Mysura Reddy Mule	52,429	48.50	+0
TDP	Gandluru Veera Siva Reddy	41,898	43.07	−0
Majority		10,331	10.64	−0
Turnout		97,274	74.08	+2.26
INC gain from TDP		Swing		

=== 2004 ===
2004 Andhra Pradesh Legislative Assembly election: Kamalapuram
Party	Candidate	Votes	%	±%
TDP	Gandluru Veera Siva Reddy	57,542	54.25	+11.18
INC	Putha Narasimha Reddy	46,254	43.61	−10.29
Majority		11,288	10.64	
Turnout		106,064	74.44	+2.26
TDP gain from INC		Swing		

=== 2009 ===
2009 Andhra Pradesh Legislative Assembly election: Kamalapuram
Party	Candidate	Votes	%	±%
INC	Gandluru Veera Siva Reddy	65,386	48.41	+4.80
TDP	Putha Narasimha Reddy	61,223	45.32	−8.93
PRP	O Subba Reddy	3,366	2.49	
Majority		4,163	3.09	
Turnout		135,080	84.44	+10.00
INC gain from TDP		Swing		

=== 2014 ===
2014 Andhra Pradesh Legislative Assembly election: Kamalapuram
Party	Candidate	Votes	%	±%
YSRCP	Pochimareddy Ravindranath Reddy	78,547	46.36	
TDP	Putha Narasimha Reddy	73,202	45.00	−0.32
Majority		5,345	1.36	
Turnout		1,57,094	96.65	
YSRCP gain from INC		Swing		

=== 2019 ===
2019 Andhra Pradesh Legislative Assembly election: Kamalapuram
Party	Candidate	Votes	%	±%
YSRCP	Pochimareddy Ravindranath Reddy	88,482	55.88	+9.52
TDP	Putha Narasimha Reddy	61,149	38.62	−6.38
Majority		27,333	17.15	
Turnout		1,59,330	82.58	
YSRCP hold		Swing		

=== 2024 ===
2024 Andhra Pradesh Legislative Assembly election: Kamalapuram
Party	Candidate	Votes	%	±%
TDP	Putha Krishna Chaitanya Reddy	95,207	55.29	
YSRCP	Pochimareddy Ravindranath Reddy	69,850	40.56	
CPI	Gali Chandra	1,092	0.63	
NOTA	None Of The Above	2,128	1.24	
Majority		25,357	14.72	
Turnout		1,72,196		
TDP gain from YSRCP		Swing		

== See also ==
- List of constituencies of Andhra Pradesh Legislative Assembly
