= Aarogyasri =

Aarogyasri is a publicly funded healthcare scheme originally introduced by the Government of Andhra Pradesh in India in 2007. Officially known as the Rajiv Aarogyasri Community Health Insurance Scheme, it was established to provide access to specialised medical treatment for economically disadvantaged families, particularly those requiring hospitalisation for serious illnesses. The scheme operates through a network of participating government and private hospitals and provides cashless treatment for specified medical conditions.

Following the bifurcation of Andhra Pradesh in 2014, the two successor states continued related healthcare programmes under different names. Telangana retained the Aarogyasri name, while Andhra Pradesh renamed its programme Dr. NTR Vaidya Seva before subsequently adopting the Dr. YSR Aarogyasri name.

== History ==
The scheme was launched on 1 April 2007 on a pilot basis in three districts of the then undivided Andhra Pradesh: Anantapur, Mahabubnagar and Srikakulam. It was subsequently extended across the state in phases, with statewide coverage reached in July 2008. The programme was initiated during the administration of Chief Minister Y. S. Rajasekhara Reddy, commonly known as YSR.
