= Y. S. Sharmila =

Indian politician (born 1980)

Y. S. Sharmila Reddy
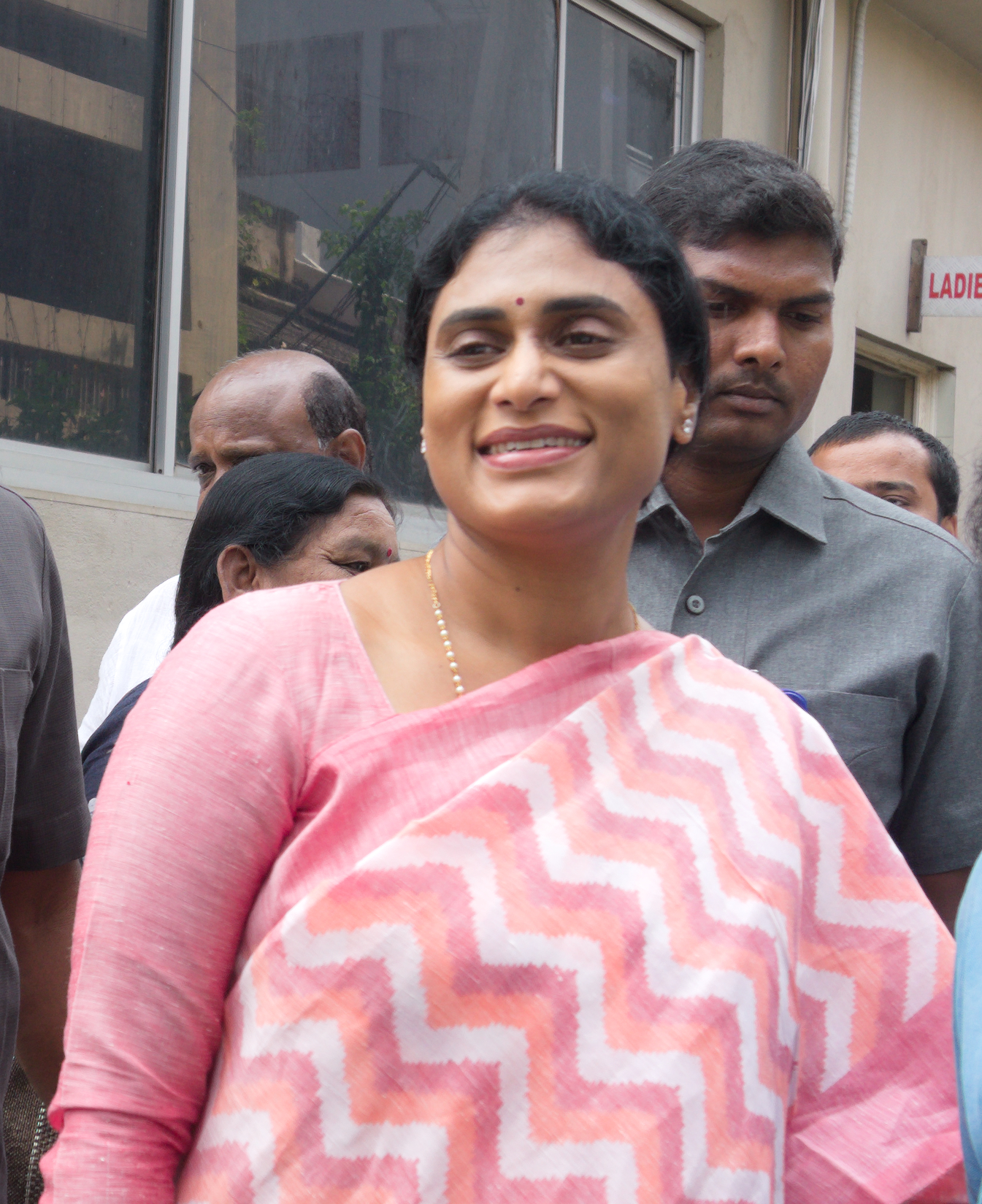

24th President Andhra Pradesh Congress Committee
- Incumbent
- Assumed office 16 January 2024
- AICC President: Mallikarjun Kharge
- Preceded by: Gidugu Rudra Raju

President of YSR Telangana Party
- In office 8 July 2021 – 4 January 2024
- Preceded by: Office established
- Succeeded by: Office abolished

Personal details
- Born: 17 December 1980 (age 45) Hyderabad, Andhra Pradesh, India (now in Telangana, India)
- Party: Indian National Congress (2024–present)
- Other political affiliations: YSR Telangana Party (2021–2024); YSR Congress Party (until 2021)
- Relations: Y. S. Jagan Mohan Reddy (brother); Y. S. Avinash Reddy (cousin); Y. S. Vivekananda Reddy (uncle)
- Children: 2
- Parents: Y. S. Rajasekhara Reddy (father); Y. S. Vijayamma (mother)

Yeduguri Sandinti Sharmila Reddy (born 17 December 1980), commonly referred to as Y. S. Sharmila, is an Indian politician serving as 24th and current president of the Andhra Pradesh Congress Committee, a unit of Indian National Congress political party. She is the younger sister of Y. S. Jagan Mohan Reddy and the daughter of Y. S. Rajasekhara Reddy and Y. S. Vijayamma.

== Political career ==
=== Early political career ===
Sharmila made headlines after she took up campaigning on behalf of the YSR Congress Party (YSRCP) along with her mother Y. S. Vijayamma, in the absence of her elder brother Y. S. Jagan Mohan Reddy from June 2012 in Andhra Pradesh. She worked as the party convener for the YSRCP, which won 15 of the 18 assembly seats and 1 of the 1 Parliament seats in the by-elections.

Sharmila began her 3,000 km-walkathon (1,900 mi) at Idupulapaya in Kadapa district on 18 October 2012. She completed it on 4 August 2013 in Ichchapuram. She toured 14 districts as part of the walkathon.

Before the 2019 Andhra Pradesh Legislative Assembly election, Sharmila undertook an 11-day bus Yatra across Andhra Pradesh in branded buses with a “Bye Bye Babu” timer clock, suggesting that it was time for the then Chief Minister N. Chandrababu Naidu. The campaign under the name “Praja Theerpu - Bye Bye Babu” covered 1,553 km (965 mi) and 39 public addresses. She also handed out over 20,000 autographed caps.

=== YSR Telangana Party ===
In February 2021, Sharmila stated that she had political differences with her brother Jagan, who is the founder of the YSR Congress Party, and claimed there was no presence of the party in the state of Telangana.

On 9 April 2021, Sharmila had announced that she would launch a new political party on 8 July 2021 in Telangana. She chose the date because it is the birth date of her father, Rajasekhara Reddy. Ahead of the party's launch, she has started campaigning against the incumbent Bharat Rashtra Samithi government.

On 8 July 2021, she announced the formation of the YSR Telangana Party.

During November 2023, Sharmila declared that her party would abstain from participating in the Telangana Legislative Assembly election to the media at an event in Hyderabad. She acknowledged the electoral potential for the Congress party and underscored that their aim was not to undermine the Congress but rather to pledge support if the Indian National Congress were to assume power, ensuring the successful implementation of their policies.

On 4 January 2024, she merged YSR Telangana Party with Indian National Congress.

=== Indian National Congress ===
Post the merger of YSRTP with INC, Sharmila joined the Indian National Congress party at New Delhi in the presence of AICC president Mallikarjun Kharge and senior leader Rahul Gandhi.

On 16 January 2024, Sharmila was appointed as president of the Andhra Pradesh Congress Committee.

== Personal life ==
Sharmila was born into a Reddy political-business family to Y. S. Rajasekhara Reddy and Vijayamma in Hyderabad. She second married Morusupalli Anil Kumar in 1995. Kumar, born into a Hindu Brahmin family in Telangana, converted to Christianity and now leads Anil World Evangelism. The couple have two children – a son and a daughter and resides in Hyderabad.
