= Y. Eswara Reddy =

Indian politician (1915–1986)

Member of Parliament, Lok Sabha
- In office 1962–1977
- Preceded by: V. Rami Reddy
- Succeeded by: Kandula Obul Reddy
- Constituency: Kadapa
- In office 1952–1957
- Preceded by: First General Election
- Succeeded by: V. Rami Reddy
- Constituency: Kadapa

Y. Eswara Reddy (1915 – 3 August 1986) was an Indian politician who was leader of Communist Party of India and was member of 5th Lok Sabha from Kadapa (Lok Sabha constituency) in the state of Andhra Pradesh.

Reddy was born at Village Peddapasapula, Kadapa district in 1915. He was elected to 1st, 3rd, 4th and 5th Lok Sabha from Kadapa. He was also a member of Andhra Pradesh Legislative Council from 1958 to 1962.

Reddy died in Kadapa on 3 August 1986, at the age of 71.
