= Vutukuru Rami Reddy =

Indian politician (1918–1995)

Member of Parliament, Lok Sabha
- In office 1957-1962
- Preceded by: Y. Eswara Reddy
- Succeeded by: Y. Eswara Reddy
- Constituency: Kadapa

Personal details
- Born: 1 July 1918 Kristamgaripalle, Cuddapah District, Madras Presidency, British India (Presently in Andhra Pradesh, India)
- Died: 15 April 1995 (aged 76) Andhra Pradesh, India
- Party: Indian National Congress
- Spouse: Maheshwaramma

Vutukuru Rami Reddy (1 July 1918 – 15 April 1995) was an Indian politician. He was elected to the Lok Sabha, the lower house of the Parliament of India as a member of the Indian National Congress. He did his graduation in Loyola College and his law degree in Madras Law College. Reddy died in Andhra Pradesh on 15 April 1995, at the age of 76.
