= Free electricity to farmers (Andhra Pradesh) =

Government policy of Andhra Pradesh, India

Free electricity to farmers is a subsidised free electricity scheme provided by the Government of Andhra Pradesh. It was the dream concept of Late Chief Minister of Andhra Pradesh Dr. Y. S. Rajasekhara Reddy. Green Andhra Pradesh was his vision. It provides 7 hours of power to the fields in a day. It has spent about 6000 crores in 2013.

== History ==
After the Congress party made a promise to the electorate, as soon as he swore in as chief minister of Andhra Pradesh, Y. S. Rajasekhara Reddy on 14 May 2004, he signed the scheme.

The scheme announced before the polls was a major promise in the 2004 assembly elections. The initial subsidy bill was Rs. 400 crores.
