= Pulivendla Assembly constituency =

Constituency of the Andhra Pradesh Legislative Assembly, India

Coordinates: 14.42°N 78.22°E

Pulivendula
- Constituency No. 129 for the Andhra Pradesh Legislative Assembly
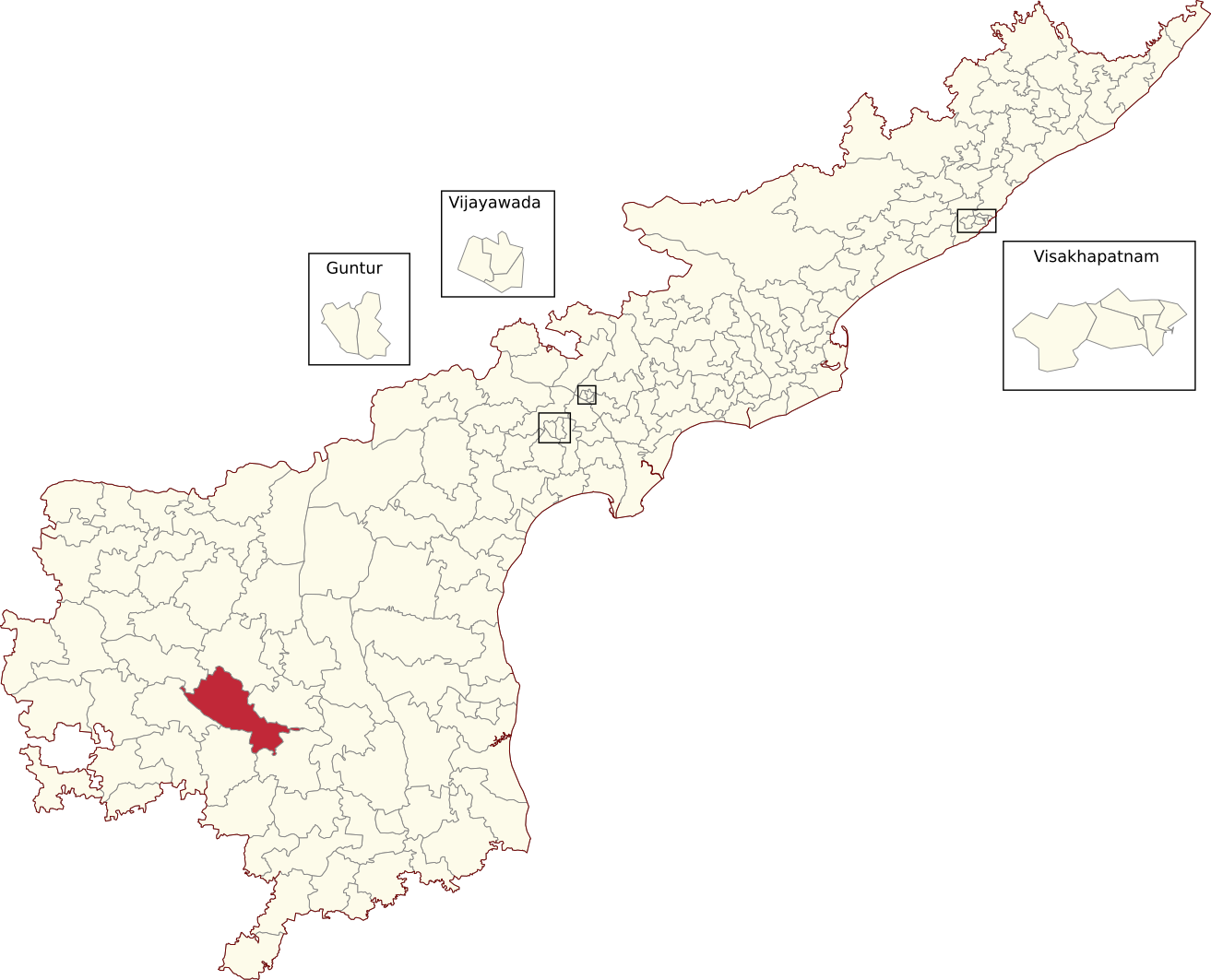
- Location of Pulivendula Assembly constituency within Andhra Pradesh

Constituency details
- Country: India
- Region: South India
- State: Andhra Pradesh
- District: YSR Kadapa
- Lok Sabha constituency: Kadapa
- Established: 1955
- Total electors: 223,407
- Reservation: None

Member of Legislative Assembly
- 16th Andhra Pradesh Legislative Assembly
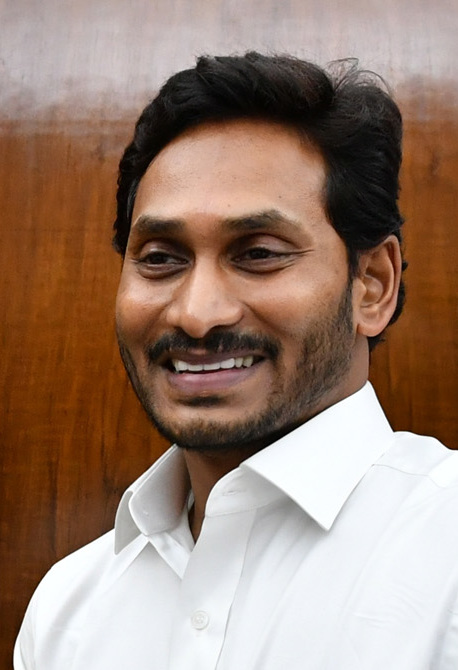
- Incumbent Y. S. Jagan Mohan Reddy
- Party: YSRCP
- Elected year: 2024

Pulivendula Assembly constituency is a constituency in YSR Kadapa district of Andhra Pradesh that elects representatives to the Andhra Pradesh Legislative Assembly in India. It is one of seven assembly segments of Kadapa Lok Sabha constituency.

Y. S. Jagan Mohan Reddy is the current MLA of the constituency, having won the 2019 Andhra Pradesh Legislative Assembly election from YSR Congress Party. He was the Chief Minister of the state, from 2019 to 2024. As of 2019, there are a total of 223,407 electors in the constituency. The constituency was established in 1955, as per the Delimitation Orders (1955).

== Mandals ==
Mandal
Simhadripuram
Lingala
Thondur
Pulivendula
Vemula
Vempalle
Chakrayapet

Mandals in Pulivendla Assembly Constituency

== Members of the Legislative Assembly ==
Year	Member	Political party
1955	Penchikala Basi Reddy	Indian National Congress
1962	Chavva Bali Reddy	Independent
1967	Penchikala Basi Reddy	Indian National Congress
1972	Penchikala Basi Reddy	Indian National Congress
1978	Y. S. Rajasekhara Reddy	Indian National Congress
1983	Y. S. Rajasekhara Reddy	Indian National Congress
1985	Y. S. Rajasekhara Reddy	Indian National Congress
1989	Y. S. Vivekananda Reddy	Indian National Congress
1991^	Y. S. Purushothama Reddy	Indian National Congress
1994	Y. S. Vivekananda Reddy	Indian National Congress
1999	Y. S. Rajasekhara Reddy	Indian National Congress
2004	Y. S. Rajasekhara Reddy	Indian National Congress
2009	Y. S. Rajasekhara Reddy	Indian National Congress
2010^	Y. S. Vijayamma	Indian National Congress
2011^	Y. S. Vijayamma	YSR Congress Party
2014	Y. S. Jagan Mohan Reddy	YSR Congress Party
2019	Y. S. Jagan Mohan Reddy	YSR Congress Party
2024	Y. S. Jagan Mohan Reddy	YSR Congress Party

== Election results ==
Vote share of Winning candidates
2024	61.38%
2019	73.48%
2014	63.93%
2011 by-poll	70.09%
2010 by-poll	0.00%
2009	70.62%
2004	67.37%
1999	64.89%
1994	81.62%
1991 by-poll	89.59%
1989	71.73%
1985	65.55%
1983	57.68%
1978	59.51%
1972	61.42%
1967	81.62%
1962	55.46%
1955	66.68%

=== 2024 ===
2024 Andhra Pradesh Legislative Assembly election: Pulivendula
Party	Candidate	Votes	%	±%
YSRCP	Y. S. Jagan Mohan Reddy	116,315	61.38	▼12.10
TDP	M. Ravindranath Reddy	54,628	28.83	▲5.38
INC	Mulamreddy Dhruva Kumar Reddy	10,083	5.32	▲4.62
NOTA	None Of The Above	1,764	0.93	▼0.07
Majority		61,687	30.92	
Turnout		1,99,492		
YSRCP hold		Swing		

=== 2019 ===
2019 Andhra Pradesh Legislative Assembly election: Pulivendla
Party	Candidate	Votes	%	±%
YSRCP	Y. S. Jagan Mohan Reddy	132,356	73.48	+8.81
TDP	S. V. Satish Kumar Reddy	42,246	23.45	−3.74
Majority		90,110	50.03	+8.51
Turnout		1,88,127	80.63	+0.63
YSRCP hold		Swing	+50.02	

=== 2014 ===
2014 Andhra Pradesh Legislative Assembly election: Pulivendla
Party	Candidate	Votes	%	±%
YSRCP	Y. S. Jagan Mohan Reddy	116,000	63.93	−1.42
TDP	S. V. Sathish Kumar Reddy	39,500	27.19	+3.86
Majority		75,243	41.49	
Turnout		181,444	80.00	+1.35
YSRCP hold		Swing	Hold	

=== 2011 by-election ===
2011 Andhra Pradesh Legislative Assembly by-election: Pulivendla
Party	Candidate	Votes	%	±%
YSRCP	Y. S. Vijayamma	130,105	70.09	New
INC	Y. S. Vivekananda Reddy	28,725	18.29	−52.33
TDP	Mareddy Ravindranath Reddy	11,239	7.15	−16.63
Majority		81,373	51.80	+4.96
Turnout		1,57,092	83.00	+4.35
YSRCP gain from INC		Swing		

=== 2010 by-election ===
2010 Andhra Pradesh Legislative Assembly by-election: Pulivendla
Party	Candidate	Votes	%	±%
INC	Y. S. Vijayamma	unanimous		
Majority		unanimous		
Turnout		unanimous		
INC hold		Swing		

=== 2009 ===
2009 Andhra Pradesh Legislative Assembly election: Pulivendla
Party	Candidate	Votes	%	±%
INC	Y. S. Rajasekhara Reddy	103,556	70.62	+3.25
TDP	S. V. Sathish Kumar Reddy	34,875	23.78	−6.68
PRP	Veluru Chinna Gangireddy	1,629	1.2	
Majority		68,681	46.84	
Turnout		146,644	78.65	+2.18
INC hold		Swing		

=== 2004 ===
2004 Andhra Pradesh Legislative Assembly election: Pulivendla
Party	Candidate	Votes	%	±%
INC	Y. S. Rajasekhara Reddy	74,432	67.37	+2.48
TDP	S. V. Sathish Kumar Reddy	33,655	30.46	−3.03
Majority		40,777	36.91	
Turnout		110,482	76.47	+8.51
INC hold		Swing		

=== 1999 ===
1999 Andhra Pradesh Legislative Assembly election: Pulivendula
Party	Candidate	Votes	%	±%
INC	Y. S. Rajasekhara Reddy	62,019	64.89	
TDP	Satishkumar Reddy Singareddy	32,010	33.49	
ATDP	Pandillapalle Adilakshumma	598	0.63	
MBT	Shaik Ibrahim	95	0.10	
NTRTDP(LP)	Madhusudhana Reddy Thugutla	67	0.07	
IND	6 Independent Candidates	791	0.82	
Majority		30,009	31.40	
Turnout		98,293	69.89	
INC hold		Swing		

=== 1994 ===
1994 Andhra Pradesh Legislative Assembly election: Pulivendula
Party	Candidate	Votes	%	±%
INC	Y. S. Vivekananda Reddy	90,673	81.62	
TDP	Sirigireddy Ramamuni Reddy	19,093	17.19	
LP (Note: Lok Party)	Katikireddy Sreerami Reddy	366	0.33	
IND	10 Independent Candidates	957	0.85	
Majority		71,580	64.43	
Turnout		112,107	74.36	
INC hold		Swing		

=== 1991 by-election ===
1991 Andhra Pradesh Legislative Assembly by-election: Pulivendula
Party	Candidate	Votes	%	±%
INC	Y. S. Purushothama Reddy	109,318	89.59	
TDP	B. R. Annareddy	11,870	9.73	
IND	A. N. Rao	364	0.30	
IND	C. R. Pandirlapally	190	0.16	
IND	C. R. Gurrala	126	0.10	
IND	R. R. Annareddy	111	0.09	
IND	K. Parem	51	0.04	
Majority		97,448	79.86	
Turnout				
INC hold		Swing		

=== 1989 ===
1989 Andhra Pradesh Legislative Assembly election: Pulivendula
Party	Candidate	Votes	%	±%
INC	Y. S. Vivekananda Reddy	77,183	71.73	
TDP	Jyoti Devi Reddy	29,437	27.36	
IND	10 Independent Candidates	976	0.90	
Majority		47,746	44.37	
Turnout		110,609	70.48	
INC hold		Swing		

=== 1985 ===
1985 Andhra Pradesh Legislative Assembly election: Pulivendla
Party	Candidate	Votes	%	±%
INC	Y. S. Rajasekhara Reddy	61,048	65.55	
TDP	Devireddy Sadasiva Reddy	30,206	32.43	
IND	16 Independent Candidates	1,885	2.05	
Majority		30,842	33.12	
Turnout		94,152	73.64	
INC hold		Swing		

=== 1983 ===
1983 Andhra Pradesh Legislative Assembly election: Pulivendla
Party	Candidate	Votes	%	±%
INC	Y. S. Rajasekhara Reddy	47,256	57.68	
IND	Yeddula Bali Reddy	33,889	41.37	
IND	Kadiri Obula Reddy	566	0.69	
IND	M. Rajasekhara Reddy	212	0.26	
Majority		13,367	16.31	
Turnout		83,236	77.21	
INC hold		Swing		

=== 1978 ===
1978 Andhra Pradesh Legislative Assembly election: Pulivendla
Party	Candidate	Votes	%	±%
INC(R)	Y. S. Rajasekhar Reddy	47,874	59.51	
JP	D. Narayana Reddy	27,378	34.03	
INC(I)	B. Somi Reddy	4,556	5.66	
IND	N. Baba Sab	636	0.79	
Majority		20,496	25.48	
Turnout		82,170	82.89	
INC hold		Swing		

=== 1972 ===
1972 Andhra Pradesh Legislative Assembly election: Pulivendla
Party	Candidate	Votes	%	±%
INC	Basireddi Penchikala	37,742	61.42	
IND	Nara Ana Reddy Devireddy	22,237	36.19	
CPI(M)	Kuppala Pedda Subbana	767	1.25	
IND	Devireddy Somamma	289	0.47	
IND	K. C. Maddulate Reddy	233	0.38	
IND	R. Reddy Devireddy	177	0.29	
Majority		15,505	25.23	
Turnout		62,673	74.27	
INC hold		Swing		

=== 1967 ===
1967 Andhra Pradesh Legislative Assembly election: Pulivendla
Party	Candidate	Votes	%	±%
INC	B. R. Penchikala	43,421	81.62	
CPI(M)	V. R. Ponnathota	9,775	18.38	
Majority		33,646	63.24	
Turnout		54,652	74.39	
Swing to INC from Independent		Swing		

=== 1962 ===
1962 Andhra Pradesh Legislative Assembly election: Pulivendla
Party	Candidate	Votes	%	±%
IND	Chavva Bali Reddy	25,451	55.46	
INC	Penchikala Basi Reddy	20,443	44.54	
Majority		5,008	10.92	
Turnout		47,260	74.44	
Swing to Independent from INC		Swing		

=== 1955 ===
1955 Andhra State Legislative Assembly election: Pulivendla
Party	Candidate	Votes	%	±%
INC	P. Basi Reddi	27,820	66.68	
CPI	Gajjalla Malla Reddy	13,903	33.32	
Majority		13,917	33.36	
Turnout		41,723	70.08	
INC win (new seat)				

== See also ==
- List of constituencies of Andhra Pradesh Legislative Assembly
