= Putha Krishna Chaitanya Reddy =

Indian politician

Member of Legislative Assembly Andhra Pradesh
- Incumbent
- Assumed office 2024
- Preceded by: Pochimareddy Ravindranath Reddy
- Constituency: Kamalapuram

Personal details
- Born: 1982 (age 43–44)
- Party: Telugu Desam Party

Putha Krishna Chaitanya Reddy (born 1982) is an Indian politician from Andhra Pradesh. He is an MLA from Kamalapuram Assembly constituency in Kadapa district. He represents Telugu Desam Party. He won the 2024 Andhra Pradesh Legislative Assembly election where TDP had an alliance with BJP and Jana Sena Party.

== Early life and education ==
Reddy is from Kamalapuram. His father Putha Narasimha Reddy contested the Kamalapuram seat on INC 1 time in 2004 and TDP ticket unsuccessfully 3 times from 2009 to 2019 Assembly election. He completed his M.Sc. in Information and Technology in 2005 at Middlesex University, England.

== Political career ==
Reddy won the 2024 Andhra Pradesh Legislative Assembly election from Kamalapuram Assembly constituency representing Telugu Desam Party. He polled 95,207 votes and defeated Pochimareddy Ravindranath Reddy of YSR Congress Party by a margin of 25,357 votes.
