= Y. S. Jagan Mohan Reddy =

Former Chief Minister of Andhra Pradesh, India

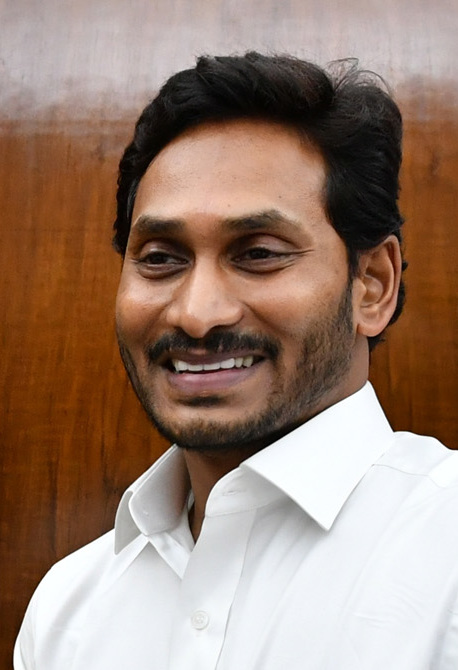
- Reddy in 2019

17th Chief Minister of Andhra Pradesh
- In office 30 May 2019 – 11 June 2024
- Governor: E. S. L. Narasimhan (2019); B. Harichandan (2019–2023); S. Abdul Nazeer (2023–present)
- Cabinet: Y. S. Jagan
- Deputy Chief Minister: K. Narayana Swamy (2019-2024); Amzath Basha (2019–2023); P. Pushpasreevani (2019–2022); P. Subhash Chandra Bose (2019–2020); Alla Nani (2019–2022); Dharmana Krishna Das (2020–2022); Budi Mutyala Naidu (2022–2024); K. Satyanarayana (2022–2024); Rajanna Dora Peedika (2022–2024)
- Preceded by: N. Chandrababu Naidu
Additional ministries
In office 30 May 2019 – 8 June 2024
Ministry and Departments	General Administration; Personnel; Other departments not allocated to any Minister
Preceded by	N. Chandrababu Naidu
Succeeded by	N. Chandrababu Naidu

Member of Legislative Assembly Andhra Pradesh
- Incumbent
- Assumed office 19 June 2014
- Preceded by: Y. S. Vijayamma
- Constituency: Pulivendula

9th Leader of the Opposition, Andhra Pradesh Legislative Assembly
- In office 20 June 2014 – 29 May 2019
- Governor: E. S. L. Narasimhan
- Chief Minister: N. Chandrababu Naidu
- Preceded by: N. Chandrababu Naidu
- Succeeded by: N. Chandrababu Naidu

1st President of YSR Congress Party
- Incumbent
- Assumed office 12 March 2011
- Chairperson: Y. S. Vijayamma (2011–2022)
- Preceded by: Position Established

Member of Parliament, Lok Sabha
- In office 14 May 2011 – 23 May 2014
- Preceded by: Himself
- Succeeded by: Y. S. Avinash Reddy
- Constituency: Kadapa, Andhra Pradesh
- In office 1 June 2009 – 28 November 2010
- Preceded by: Y. S. Vivekananda Reddy
- Succeeded by: Himself
- Constituency: Kadapa, Andhra Pradesh

Personal details
- Born: Yeduguri Sandinti Jagan Mohan Reddy; 21 December 1972 (age 53) Jammalamadugu, Andhra Pradesh, India
- Party: YSR Congress Party
- Other political affiliations: Indian National Congress (until 2011)
- Spouse: Y. S. Bharathi (m. 1996)
- Children: 2
- Parents: Y. S. Rajasekhara Reddy (father); Y. S. Vijayamma (mother)
- Relatives: Y. S. Sharmila (sister); Y. S. Avinash Reddy (cousin); Y. S. Vivekananda Reddy (uncle)
- Education: Pragathi Mahavidyalaya

Yeduguri Sandinti Jagan Mohan Reddy (born 21 December 1972), also known mononymously as Jagan, is an Indian politician and a Member of Legislative Assembly representing Pulivendula Assembly constituency in the Andhra Pradesh Legislative assembly. He previously served as the 17th Chief Minister of Andhra Pradesh. He is the founding president of YSR Congress Party. He is also the son of Y. S. Rajasekhara Reddy, former Chief Minister of Andhra Pradesh and Y. S. Vijayamma. He is also the brother of APCC president Y. S. Sharmila.

Jagan Mohan Reddy started his political career in the Indian National Congress and was elected as the Member of Parliament of Kadapa in 2009. After his father's death in a helicopter crash in 2009, he started an Odarpu Yatra (a consoling tour) across the state. He then eventually left the Congress Party and established his own party, YSR Congress Party which also matches his father's acronym, YSR.

On 27 May 2012, Reddy was arrested by the Central Bureau of Investigation (CBI) on embezzlement charges. CBI summoned Reddy for allegedly amassing huge assets through illegal means by using his father's office, Y. S. Rajasekhara Reddy, when he was the chief minister. CBI and ED has also summoned 58 companies of investing in Reddy's businesses, for the favours they allegedly received in the form of mining leases, allotments of projects. His judicial custody was extended repeatedly as the investigation proceeded. The Supreme Court of India dismissed his Bail petition on 4 July 2012, 9 August 2012, 7 November 2012, 9 May 2013, 13 May 2013. After 16 months in judicial custody, he was released from jail on 24 September 2013.

In the 2014 Andhra Pradesh Legislative Assembly elections, YSRCP won 67 seats and he became the Leader of the Opposition. Five years later, in 2019 Andhra Pradesh Legislative Assembly elections, he led the party to a landslide victory in the state elections by winning 151 seats of the total 175 assembly segments. On 12 June 2024, YSR Congress Party lost the elections after the TDP in alliance with the BJP and the JSP had a landslide victory in the 2024 state elections, garnering 164 out of 175 seats, with Jagan and his party winning only 11 out of 175 seats.

== Early life ==
Jagan Mohan Reddy was born in Jammalamadugu, Kadapa district, Andhra Pradesh, to Y. S. Rajasekhara Reddy and Y. S. Vijayamma, into a Christian Reddy family. His younger sister, Y. S. Sharmila, is also a politician.

Reddy attended Hyderabad Public School through Class 12. He later graduated from Pragathi Mahavidyalaya Degree and PG College in Koti, Hyderabad, with a Bachelor of Commerce degree.

Reddy married Bharathi on 28 August 1996. They have two daughters.

== Business ventures ==
In 2001, Reddy acquired Sandur Power Company Limited (SPCL), a defunct power project, from its original promoter, M. B. Ghorpade. SPCL later invested crores of rupees in other companies and could acquire more businesses. It is headed by his wife, Y. S. Bharathi. Reddy sold his shares in SPCL and moved away from his active direct businesses as he got more involved in politics.

== Political career ==
Reddy's father Y. S. Rajasekhara Reddy, popularly known as YSR, was a two-time chief minister of Andhra Pradesh, serving from 2004 to 2009. He started his political career campaigning for Indian National Congress during the 2004 elections in Kadapa district. In 2009, he was elected as Member of Parliament from Kadapa Lok Sabha constituency.

Following the death of his father in September 2009, he started efforts to take up the political legacy left by his father. The majority of the legislators favoured him to be appointed as the Chief Minister, but this choice was not approved by party leaders Sonia and Rahul Gandhi.

Six months after his father's death, he began an odarpu yatra (condolence tour), as promised earlier, to go and meet the families of those alleged to have either committed suicide or suffered ill health on the news of his father's death. The Congress party's central leadership directed him to call off his odarpu yatra, an order which he defied leading to a fallout between the high command and himself. He went ahead with the yatra, stating that it was a personal matter.

=== 2010–2014: Founding of YSR Congress Party ===
Following the fallout with the Congress party high command, on 29 November 2010, he resigned from Kadapa Lok Sabha constituency and has also quit the party. His mother, Vijayamma, has also resigned from Pulivendula Assembly constituency and has quit the party as well. He announced on 7 December 2010 from Pulivendula that he would be starting a new party within 45 days. In March 2011, he announced that he would launch the new party, named YSR Congress Party, at Jaggampeta, East Godavari district. Later, his party went to by-polls in Kadapa district and won almost all the seats with a huge majority. Reddy, as the president of YSR Congress, faced by-election from the Kadapa constituency and won by a large margin of 545,043 votes. His mother has also won the Pulivendula Assembly constituency by 85,193 votes against Y. S. Vivekananda Reddy.

=== 2014–2019: Leader of opposition and Padayatra ===
In 2014, the YSR Congress Party was a pre-poll favourite among most analysts and psephologists. But, the YSRCP lost the 2014 elections, winning only 67 of 175 seats in the state assembly, with 45% of vote share. The Telugu Desam Party vote share went up to 47% and the 2% gap led to the defeat of YSRCP.

As a leader of the Opposition in Assembly and YSR Congress Party's president, Reddy launched his 3,000-km-long walkathon named Praja Sankalpa Yatra, popularly called padayatra, on 6 November 2017 at Idupulapaya in Kadapa district. YSR Congress party coined a slogan "Raavali Jagan, Kaavali Jagan" (transl. Jagan should come. We want Jagan.) for the foot march that took him across 125 Assembly segments all over the state in 430 days and ended on 9 January 2019.

Reddy while boarding a flight to Hyderabad was attacked with a cock fighting knife in the VIP Lounge of Visakhapatnam Airport on 25 October 2018. He received a lacerated injury on his shoulder and had to undergo a surgery.

=== 2019–2024: As Chief Minister ===
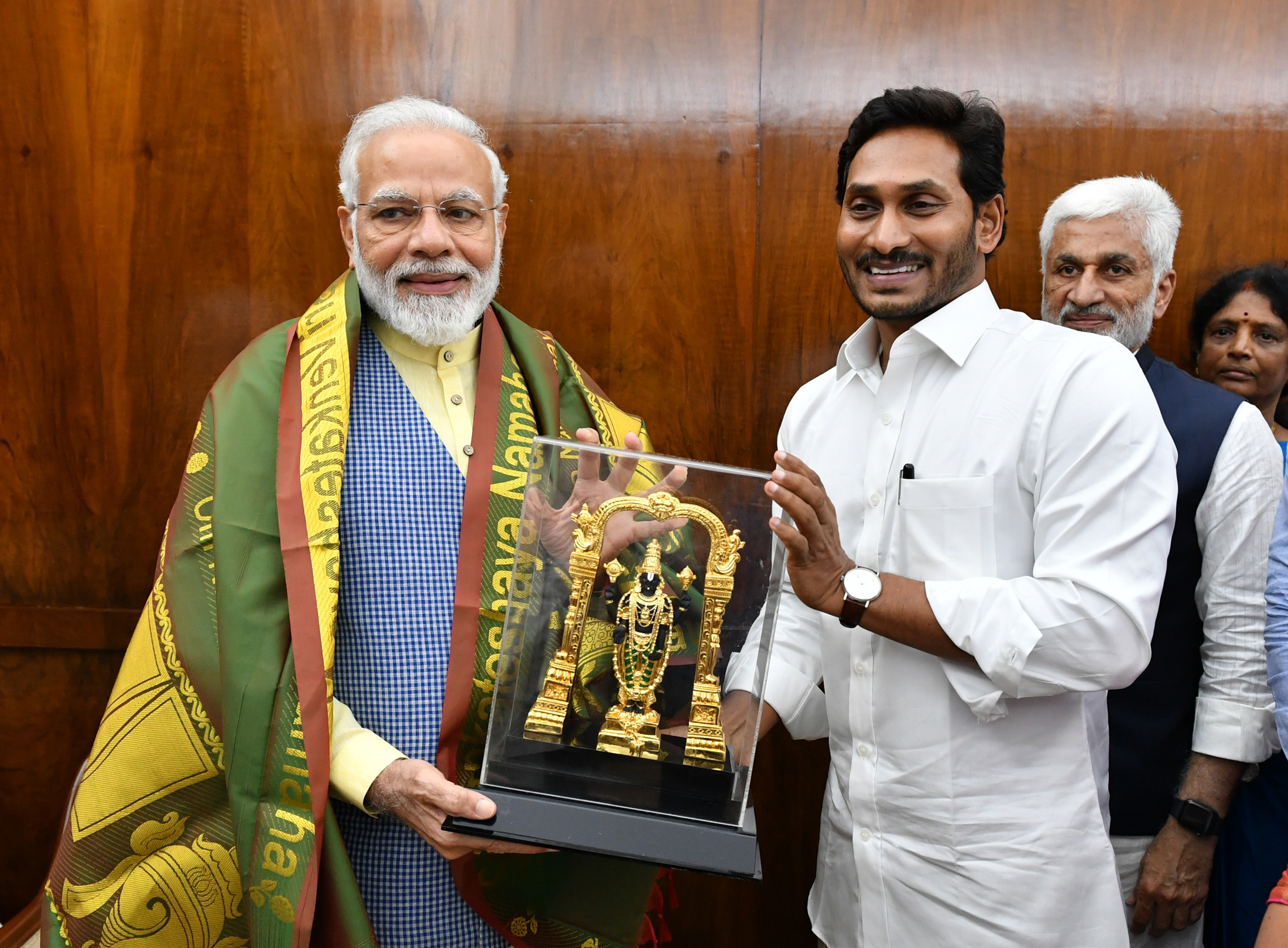
Reddy with Prime Minister Narendra Modi

In the 2019 National and State election held in April and May 2019, YSR Congress Party swept the polls and won 151 of the total 175 assembly seats and 22 of the 25 Lok Sabha seats in Andhra Pradesh. He took oath as the Chief Minister on 30 May 2019. In November 2019, Reddy launched the Mana Badi Nadu–Nedu programme to upgrade infrastructure in government schools. Its first phase was planned to cover 15,715 schools at an estimated cost of ₹3,500 crore. In January 2020, Reddy launched the Jagananna Amma Vodi scheme, which provided annual financial assistance of ₹15,000 to eligible mothers or guardians for their children's schooling. The scheme was initially expected to cover around 43 lakh beneficiaries. Jagananna Amma Vodi provides financial assistance for mothers or guardians from the Below Poverty Line, to educate their children. Navaratnalu is a collection of nine welfare schemes covering farmers, women, medical and health, education and Special Category Status. In May 2021, Reddy virtually laid the foundation stones for 14 proposed government medical colleges in Andhra Pradesh from his camp office in Tadepalli. The colleges formed part of a state government plan to establish 16 medical colleges with construction already underway at Paderu and Pulivendula. The plan also included nursing colleges and five multispecialty hospitals in tribal areas with approximately 2,000 medical seats proposed. He scrapped the plans for a new capital at Amaravati, proposed by the former TDP government, and has proposed three different capitals for the judicial, administrative and legislative branches at Kurnool, Amaravati and Visakhapatnam respectively. The proposal resulted in widespread protests by the farmers of Amaravati. The Andhra Pradesh High Court in a March 2022 ruling directed the Government of Andhra Pradesh to continue developing Amaravati and adjudicated that the government "lacked the competence to make any legislation for shifting, bifurcating or trifurcating the capital". In February 2023, the Andhra Pradesh government announced plans to construct nearly 3,000 temples across the state, including temples in residential areas for economically disadvantaged communities.

As of April 2023, it was reported by the Association for Democratic Reforms that he was the richest Chief Minister in India, with total assets of 510 crore.

== Pro-Christian activities ==
Jagan Reddy and his family are members of the Church of South India (CSI). In November 2019, the Andhra government run by Jagan Mohan Reddy hiked the financial assistance given to Christian pilgrims going to Jerusalem from Rs.40,000/- to Rs.60,000/- if their annual income was less than Rs.3 lakhs and Rs.30,000/- if their annual income was more than Rs.3 lakhs and an honorarium of Rs.5000/- per month to pastors is also being given. His government has launched housing schemes and financial assistance for the poor sections of the Christian community. Jagan Reddy celebrates Christmas every year with his family at his hometown's CSI church.

== Embezzlement charges ==
On 27 May 2012, Reddy was arrested by the Central Bureau of Investigation (CBI) on embezzlement charges. CBI summoned Reddy for allegedly amassing huge assets through illegal means by using his father's office, Y. S. Rajasekhara Reddy, when he was the chief minister. CBI and ED has also summoned 58 companies of investing in Reddy's businesses, for the favours they allegedly received in the form of mining leases, allotments of projects. His judicial custody was extended repeatedly as the investigation proceeded. The Supreme Court of India dismissed his Bail petition on 4 July 2012, 9 August 2012, 7 November 2012, 9 May 2013, 13 May 2013.

The YSR Congress Party and Reddy's family have been alleging a political conspiracy behind Reddy's investigations. While in jail, Reddy started a hunger strike opposing the United Progressive Alliance's decision to endorse the creation of a separate Telangana state. After 125 hours of indefinite hunger strike, his sugar levels and blood pressure were down. He was moved to Osmania General Hospital for treatment. His mother, Vijayamma, was also on hunger strike protesting the formation of Telangana. After his release, Reddy called for a 72-hour bandh protesting the formation of Telangana. Both Reddy and his mother resigned from their legislatures opposing the decision favouring the formation of Telangana.

== Other works ==
Reddy founded the Telugu daily newspaper Sakshi and the television channel Sakshi TV. He also served as the chief promoter of Bharathi Cements.

Lok Sabha
Preceded by Y. S. Vivekananda Reddy	Member of Parliament for Kadapa; 2009–2014	Succeeded by Y. S. Avinash Reddy
Political offices
Preceded by N. Chandrababu Naidu	Chief minister of Andhra Pradesh; 30 May 2019 – 11 June 2024	Succeeded by N. Chandrababu Naidu
Party political offices
Preceded by Party did not exist	Leader of the YSR Congress Party in the 15th Lok Sabha; 2011–2014	Succeeded by Mekapati Rajamohan Reddy
