= Y. S. Rajasekhara Reddy =

Indian politician (1949-2009

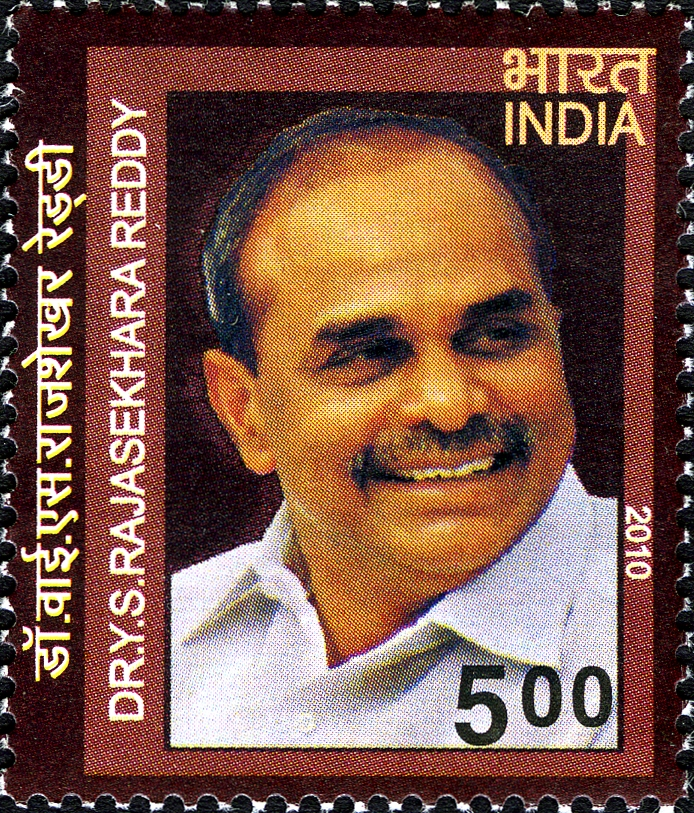
- YSR Postal Stamp 2010

Chief Minister of Andhra Pradesh
- In office 14 May 2004 – 2 September 2009
- Governor: Surjit Singh Barnala; Sushilkumar Shinde; Rameshwar Thakur; N. D. Tiwari
- Cabinet: Reddy I; Reddy II
- Preceded by: N. Chandrababu Naidu
- Succeeded by: Konijeti Rosaiah
Additional ministries
In office 14 May 2004 – 2 September 2009
Ministry and Departments	General Administration; Law & Order; Other departments not allocated to any Minister
Succeeded by	Konijeti Rosaiah

Leader of the Opposition Andhra Pradesh Legislative Assembly
- In office 12 November 1999 – 14 November 2003
- Governor: C. Rangarajan; Surjit Singh Barnala
- Chief Minister: N. Chandrababu Naidu
- Preceded by: P. Janardhan Reddy
- Succeeded by: N. Chandrababu Naidu

Member of Parliament, Lok Sabha
- In office 2 December 1989 – 26 April 1999
- Preceded by: D. N. Reddy
- Succeeded by: Y. S. Vivekananda Reddy
- Constituency: Kadapa

President of Andhra Pradesh Congress Committee
- In office 1998–1999
- AICC President: Sonia Gandhi
- Preceded by: Konijeti Rosaiah
- Succeeded by: Satyanarayana Rao
- In office 1983–1985
- AICC President: Indira Gandhi; Rajiv Gandhi
- Preceded by: Gaddam Venkatswamy
- Succeeded by: Jalagam Vengala Rao

Minister of Excise, Rural Development and Education Government of Andhra Pradesh
- In office 11 October 1980 – 9 January 1983
- Governor: K. C. Abraham
- Chief Minister: T. Anjaiah; Bhavanam Venkatarami Reddy; Kotla Vijaya Bhaskara Reddy
- Succeeded by: Tatiparthi Jeevan Reddy; Pusapati Ananda Gajapathi Raju; Karanam Ramachandra Rao

Member of Legislative Assembly Andhra Pradesh
- In office 11 October 1999 – 2 September 2009
- Preceded by: Y. S. Vivekananda Reddy
- Succeeded by: Y. S. Vijayamma
- Constituency: Pulivendla
- In office 5 March 1978 – 28 November 1989
- Preceded by: Penchikala Basi Reddy
- Succeeded by: Y. S. Vivekananda Reddy
- Constituency: Pulivendla

Personal details
- Born: Yeduguri Sandinti Rajasekhara Reddy; 8 July 1949 Pulivendula, Madras State (present-day Andhra Pradesh), India
- Died: 2 September 2009 (aged 60) Nallamala Hills, Andhra Pradesh, India
- Cause of death: Helicopter crash
- Resting place: YSR Ghat, Idupulapaya
- Party: Indian National Congress
- Spouse: Y.S. Vijayalakshmi (m. 1971)
- Children: Y. S. Jaganmohan Reddy (son); Y. S. Sharmila (daughter)
- Parent: Y. S. Raja Reddy (father)
- Relatives: Y. S. Vivekananda Reddy (brother); Y. S. Avinash Reddy (nephew)
- Education: MBBS
- Alma mater: Mahadevappa Rampure Medical College
- Profession: Physician; Politician

Yeduguri Sandinti Rajasekhara Reddy (8 July 1949 – 2 September 2009), popularly known as YSR, was an Indian politician. He served as the 14th chief minister of Andhra Pradesh from 2004 to 2009. Reddy was elected (1989, 1991, 1996 and 1998) four terms to the Lok Sabha from Kadapa. He was also elected (1978, 1983, 1985, 1999, 2004 and 2009) six terms to the Andhra Pradesh Legislative Assembly from Pulivendula. Over the course of his career, he won every election that he contested, either to Assembly or Lok Sabha.

On 2 September 2009, a helicopter carrying Reddy went missing in the Nallamala Forest area. It was later confirmed to have crashed with all five people including Reddy pronounced dead.

== Padayatra ==
In 2003, he undertook a three-month-long padayatra covering 1,500 kilometres (930 mi) in 60 days across 11 districts of Andhra Pradesh as a part of his election campaign. He led the Congress party to victory in the 2004 and 2009 assembly elections.

== Early and personal life ==
Yeduguri Sandinti Rajasekhara Reddy was born on 8 July 1949 in Pulivendula, Kadapa district, Madras State (present day Andhra Pradesh) into a Christian Reddy family of Y. S. Raja Reddy, as eldest of five sons. Rajasekhara Reddy completed his medical studies in Mahadevappa Rampure Medical College, Gulbarga, Karnataka and served as medical officer at CSI-Campbell Mission Hospital, Jammalamadugu after completing his studies. In 1973, he established a 70-bed hospital. His father Raja Reddy, was assassinated in a bomb attack on 23 May 1998.

Reddy was married to Vijaya Lakshmi. They had a son Y. S. Jaganmohan Reddy and a daughter Y. S. Sharmila. His son Jagan and younger brother Y. S. Vivekananda are also politicians. Reddy was a practicing member of the Church of South India (CSI). During his lifetime, he visited Bethlehem, Palestine, twice.

== Career ==
Rajasekhara Reddy joined Indian National Congress in 1978 and won the 1978 legislative assembly elections from Pulivendula. He became minister for Rural Development from 1980 and later shifted to the Excise Ministry in 1982 and Education in 1982–83. He won the 1983 and 1985 elections from the same constituency. In 1989, he was elected to the Lok Sabha from Cuddapah.

He won from Kadapa Parliamentary constituency for four terms in 9th, 10th, 11th and 12th Lok Sabha. During his decade-long tenure, his constituencies were well developed with Concrete Roads and drinking water taps in almost every street. Over the two decades of his career, His family ran several colleges in Pulivendla but the institutions were eventually handed over to Loyola College as no one in the family had time to run them.

=== Andhra PCC Chairman (1983-85) ===
Reddy served as the President of the Andhra Pradesh Congress Committee (APCC) for the first time from 1983 to 1985. He was appointed to this position by Indira Gandhi at the age of 34, following the Congress party's significant loss in Andhra Pradesh to the Telugu Desam Party in 1983. As state party president, he led the Congress party into the 1985 Assembly elections but was unable to overcome the popularity of the TDP led by N.T. Rama Rao.

=== Leader of the Opposition (1999-2004) ===
He returned to state politics and won the 1999 assembly elections from the same Pulivendula constituency and served as leader of opposition in Andhra Pradesh State Assembly from 1999 to 2004. In 2003, he undertook a three-month-long padayatra covering 1,500 kilometres (930 mi) in 60 days across 11 districts of Andhra Pradesh as a part of his election campaign. In a protest against assassination plot for then Chief Minister of Andhra Pradesh Nara Chandrababu Naidu, He underscored the point that the "State bureaucracy had become complacent".

=== Chief Ministership (2004–09) ===
Reddy led the congress party to victory in the 2004 assembly election and served as the 14th Chief Minister of Andhra Pradesh from 2004 to 2009. During his tenure as Chief Minister, he enacted schemes to provide free electricity for farmers, a health insurance program for rural people living below the poverty line, a free public ambulance service, low interest loans to rural women, subsidised housing for the rural poor, subsidized rice, reimbursement of college fees for underprivileged and reservation for minorities. His tenure also saw the weakening of the violent extremist left-wing Naxalite movement that was rampant in the state. He commenced the Jala Yagnam project to irrigate 4,000,000 hectares (10,000,000 acres) of land through the construction of major, medium and minor irrigation projects. In 2006, Reddy's government introduced the Indiramma programme, which included financial assistance for housing construction among families living below the poverty line in rural and urban areas. The programme was implemented in phases, with subsidies and housing loans provided to eligible beneficiaries.

==== Aarogyasri Scheme ====
Apart from the last three 5 year plans, which advocated PPP in health-care, other factors led to starting of Aarogyasri in AP. Jayati Ghosh committee on the farmer's suicide in AP brought out the precarious health conditions due to economic distress in the agriculture sector and suggested free care of the poor by the private hospitals, which have benefitted from state subsidies. These recommendations of the report became convenient support to him, being a medical doctor himself, to provide this innovative health-care scheme for all, through corporate hospitals. Earlier CM relief fund had spent Rs. 168.52 crores to help 55,362 below the poverty line (BPL) patients needing hospitalization. Simultaneously, Dalit movement highlighted problems of young children with heart ailments in the state. Soon, He announced free heart surgeries for these children, by August 2006, 4600 children were operated under the CM relief fund. This magnanimous gesture set the stage for Aarogyasri scheme.

=== Second term as the Chief Minister of Andhra Pradesh (2009) ===
He led the congress party to victory in the 2009 assembly election, winning 156 seats in the assembly. He became the first incumbent chief minister from Congress since 1969 (after Kasu Brahmananda Reddy in 1969) to win and was sworn in as the 15th Chief Minister of Andhra Pradesh on 20 May 2009. He termed the results the "people's victory" and vowed to continue welfare and development schemes, especially construction of irrigation project'.

== Disappearance and death ==
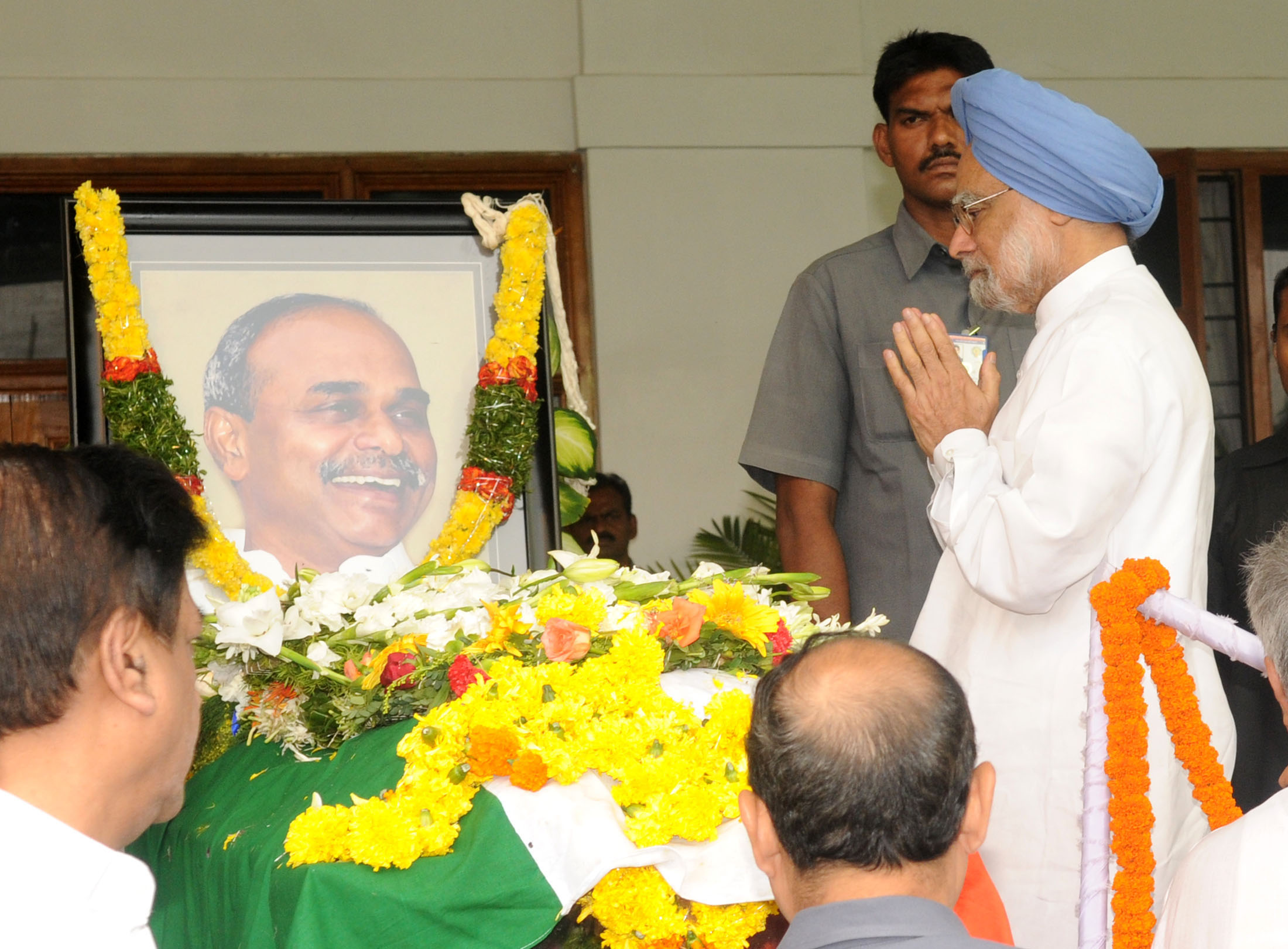
Prime Minister Manmohan Singh paying homage at the mortal remains of Y. S. Rajasekhara Reddy

On 2 September 2009, Reddy's was traveling in a Bell 430 helicopter and the Begumpet and Shamshabad air traffic controllers lost contact with the aircraft at 10:02 am while it was passing through the dense Nallamala forest area. The Chief Secretary of Andhra Pradesh said that inclement weather had forced the helicopter off course. Although the sparsely populated forest area is considered to be a stronghold of the outlawed Naxal insurgents, the National Security Advisor of India ruled out the possibility of the Naxals bringing down the helicopter. On 3 September, the Prime Minister's Office confirmed the crash of the helicopter and the death of all aboard along with Reddy. The director general of police said that the bodies were charred beyond recognition and had to be identified on the basis of clothing and the autopsy was carried out at Kurnool Medical College. An investigation eventually concluded that the factors that caused that crash was from mechanical issues and worse weather conditions.

Reddy's body was buried on 4 September at Idupulapaya in Kadapa district with full state honors in accordance with Christian rites. As per media reports, 122 people died of shock or committed suicide upon hearing the news of Reddy's death, many of whom were young supporters or those who benefited from his social welfare schemes. Finance minister Konijeti Rosaiah was sworn in as Chief Minister following Reddy's death.

== Criticism ==
Reddy was accused of amassing large amounts of money during his tenure as the Chief Minister. He is said to have used populist schemes like irrigation projects and housing schemes to his advantage and earned huge profits through them. In a leaked United States diplomatic cable, the American Consul General quotes that there was "widespread corruption that was beyond the pale even for India". The surrender of more than 650 hectares (1,600 acres) of personal land by Reddy to the government to be compliant with the law in December 2006 was criticised by opposition parties. The opposition parties demanded his resignation for owning the land in violation of the law.

N. Chandrababu Naidu also called for Reddy's resignation after a 2007 Khammam police shooting resulted in eight deaths. A federal probe of the Central Bureau of Investigation (CBI) was also launched to investigate disproportionate assets acquired by his son, Y. S. Jaganmohan Reddy, in return for favours his father made to the industrialists. In May 2012, the CBI arrested Mopidevi Venkataramana, the then Infrastructure Minister in Reddy's cabinet, who was responsible for unduly assigning the land to a private organization.

== In popular culture ==
On 8 July 2010, the Government of Andhra Pradesh renamed the Kadapa district as YSR district in honour of Reddy, who was a native of that district. On 14 September 2009, the Andhra Cricket Association renamed ACA-VDCA cricket stadium at Visakhapatnam as Dr. Y. S. Rajasekhara Reddy ACA-VDCA Cricket Stadium. Two sequential films were made about him, Yatra (2019) and Yatra 2 (2024). In 2020, the Andhra Pradesh Government declared YSR Jayanti to be celebrated as Farmer's Day on 8 July every year.

== Election Statistics ==
	Year	Contested For	Party	Constituency	Opponent	Votes	Majority	Result	Reference
1	1978	MLA	Indian National Congress	Pulivendla	Devireddy Narayan Reddy (JP)	47,874 – 27,378	+20,496	Won	
2	1983	MLA	Indian National Congress	Pulivendla	Yeddula Bali Reddy (IND)	47,256 – 33,889	+13,367	Won	
3	1985	MLA	Indian National Congress	Pulivendla	Devi Reddy Sadasiva Reddy (TDP)	61,048 – 30,206	+30,842	Won	
4	1989	MP	Indian National Congress	Kadapa	M. V. Ramana Reddy (TDP)	4,80,524 – 3,13,772	+1,66,752	Won	
5	1991	MP	Indian National Congress	Kadapa	Chennamsetty Ramachandraiah (TDP)	5,83,953 – 1,65,028	+4,18,925	Won	
6	1996	MP	Indian National Congress	Kadapa	Kandula Raja Mohan Reddy (TDP)	3,68,611- 3,63,166	+5,445	Won	
7	1998	MP	Indian National Congress	Kadapa	Kandula Raja Mohan Reddy (TDP)	3,74,762 – 3,20,881	+53,881	Won	
8	1999	MLA	Indian National Congress	Pulivendla	Singa Reddy Satish Kumar Reddy(TDP)	62,019 – 32,010	+30,009	Won	
9	2004	MLA	Indian National Congress	Pulivendla	Singa Reddy Satish Kumar Reddy (TDP)	74,432 – 33,655	+40,777	Won	
10	2009	MLA	Indian National Congress	Pulivendla	Singa Reddy Satish Kumar Reddy (TDP)	1,03,556 – 34,875	+68,681	Won	

Preceded by N. Chandrababu Naidu	Chief Minister of Andhra Pradesh; 2004–2009	Succeeded by Konijeti Rosaiah
