= Pulivendula =

- Town
- Location in Andhra Pradesh, India
- Coordinates: 14°25′10″N 78°13′30″E
- Country: India
- State: Andhra Pradesh
- District: YSR Kadapa
- Talukas: Pulivendula

Government
  - Type: Municipality
  - Body: Pura Palaka
  - Member of Legislative Assembly: Y. S. Jaganmohan Reddy

Area
  - Total: 8.53 km^{2} (3.29 sq mi)
  - Rank: 0
- Elevation: 272 m (892 ft)

Population (2011)
  - Total: 65,706
  - Density: 7,700/km^{2} (20,000/sq mi)

Languages
  - Official: Telugu
- Time zone: UTC+5:30 (IST)
- PIN: 516390
- Telephone code: 08568
- Vehicle registration: AP–04
- Website: Pulivendula Municipality

Pulivendula is a town located in the YSR Kadapa district, Andhra Pradesh, India. It is a small town which became 3rd grade municipality in 2008 from nagar Panchayat.

It is located in Pulivendula mandal and is the headquarters of the Pulivendala revenue division. It is located near Kadiri which is around 40 km away.

== Geography ==
Pulivendula is located at meridian coordinates 14.4167°N 78.2333°E. It has an average elevation of 272 meters (895 feet).

== Economy ==
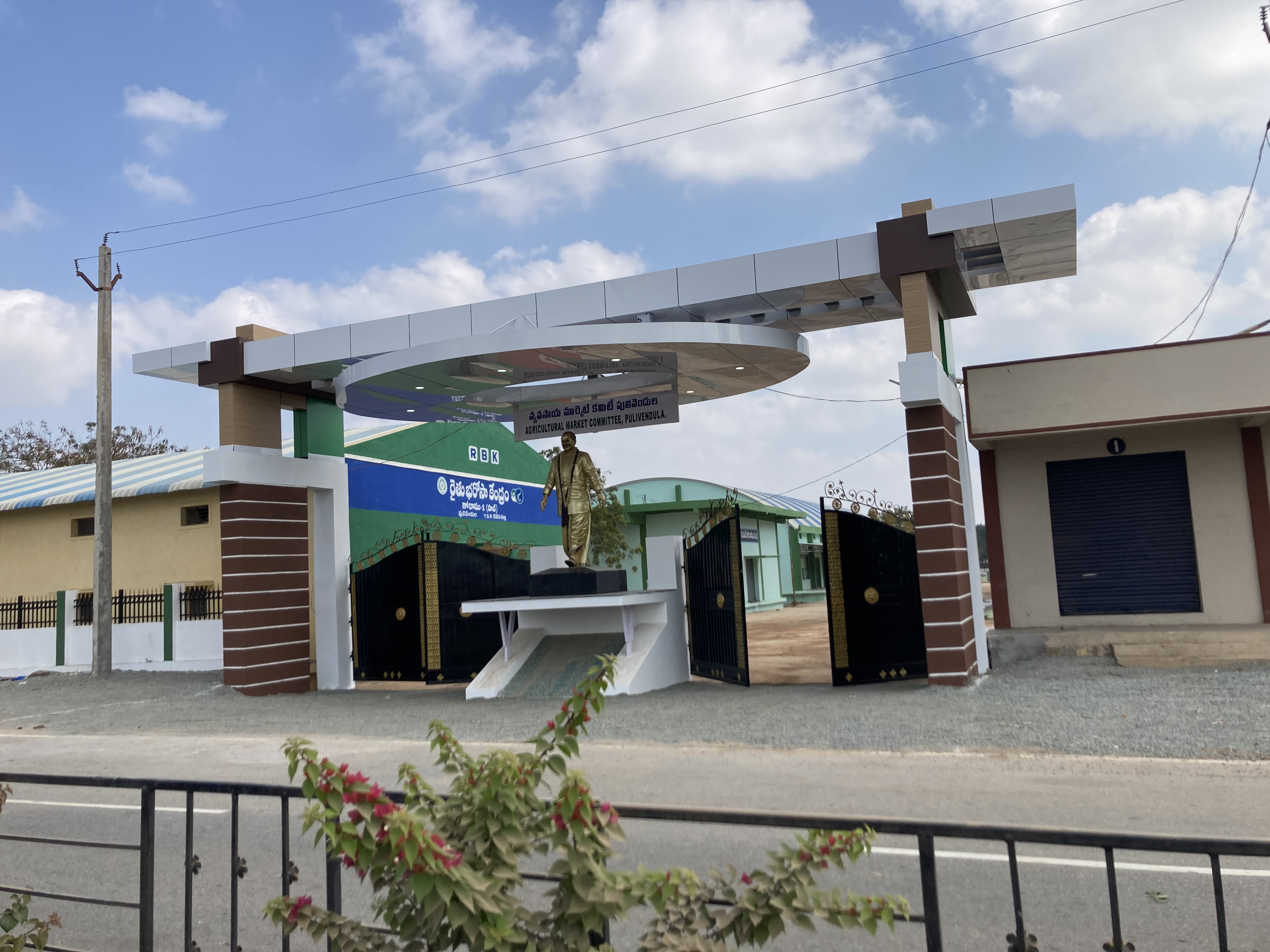
Market Yard Premises

=== Uranium mining ===
On 23 August 2007, the Cabinet Committee on Economic Affairs (CCEA) approved the establishment of a uranium mine and processing plant at Mabbuchintalapalli-Tummalapalle, about 15 km south of Pulivendula, at a total cost of 11.06 billion rupees ($269.9 million). The plant was established by the Uranium Corporation of India. The cornerstone was laid on 20 November 2007, by Y. S. Rajasekhara Reddy, Chief Minister of Andhra Pradesh.

== Transport ==
Pulivendula -Kadiri Road(WEBP)_3

Pulivendula has good infrastructure compared to other places in the Rayalaseema region, maintaining wide roads, an underground drainage system, and a ring road. Pulivendula is connected to Kadapa by a four-lane road similar to a national highway. The nearby villages are connected to Pulivendula by two-lane roads. Bus transport is available from the Dr.YSR bus Terminal And A Railway Track estimated to come soon in the town.

== Education ==
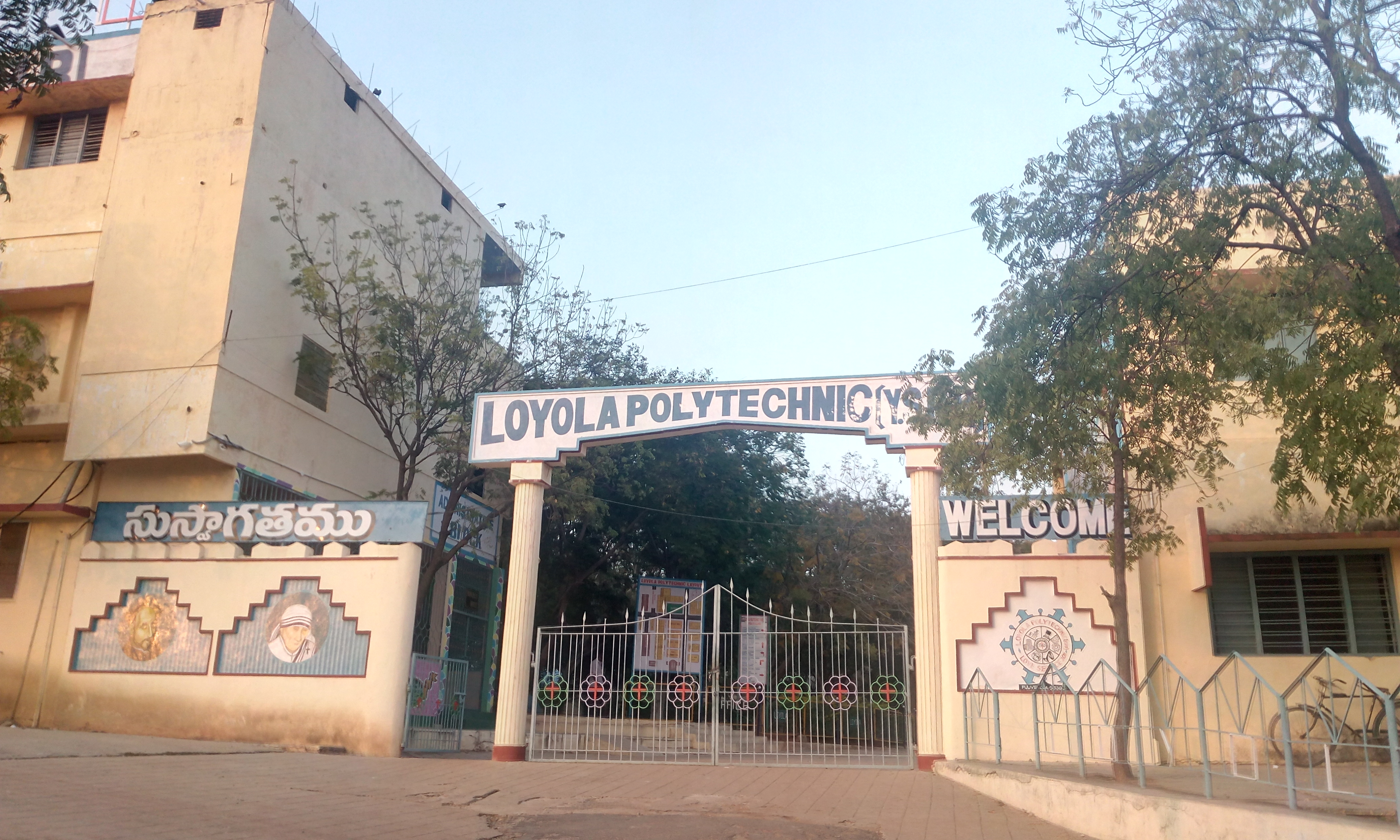
Loyola Polytechnic Entrance

Primary and secondary education is provided by both government-aided and private schools, according to Andhra Pradesh's School Education Department. The language of instruction in various schools is English or Telugu. Institutions of higher education in Pulivendula include Loyola Degree College. A new Medical college and Hospital is going to set up in the coming years.

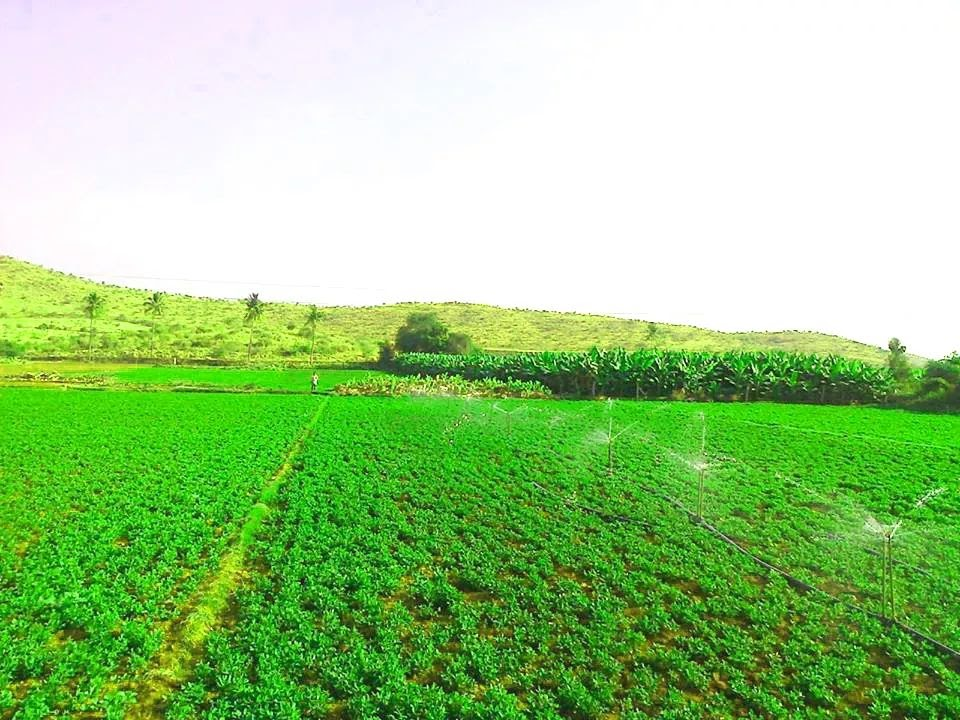
Murarichintala Banana Fields

== Notable people ==
- Yeduguri Sandinti Rajasekhara Reddy Former Chief minister of United Andhra Pradesh State. The district has been named in his memory.
- Yeduguri Sandinti Jagan Mohan Reddy Ex: Chief minister of Andhra Pradesh State. President, Yuvajana Sramika Rythu Congress Party
