= YSR Congress Party =

Political party in India

Yuvajana Sramika Rythu Congress Party
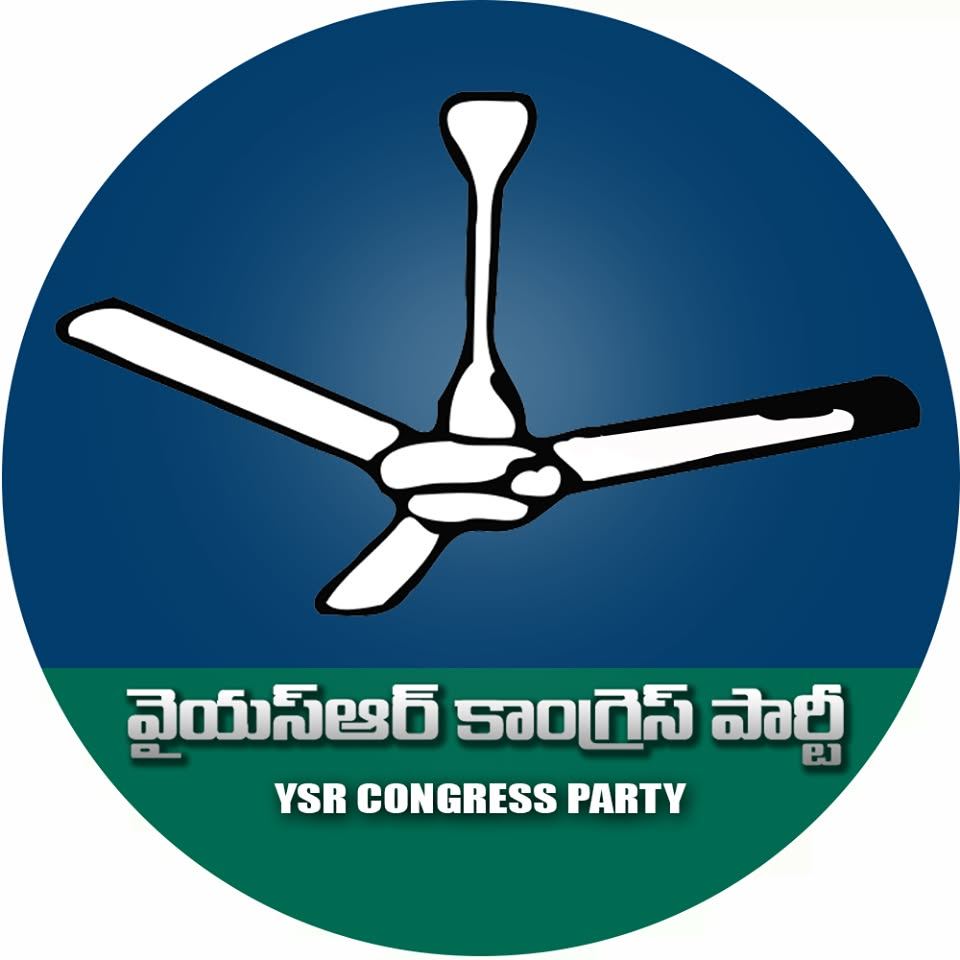
- Abbreviation: YSRCP or YCP
- President: Y. S. Jagan Mohan Reddy
- Parliamentary Chairperson: Y. V. Subba Reddy
- Rajya Sabha Leader: Y. V. Subba Reddy
- Lok Sabha Leader: P. V. Midhun Reddy
- Founder: K. Shiva Kumar
- Founded: 12 March 2011 (15 years ago)
- Split from: Indian National Congress
- Headquarters: Plot no. 13, Suryadevara Township, Tadepalli, Andhra Pradesh, India
- Student wing: YSR Students Union
- Youth wing
- Women's wing: Varudhu Kalyani
- Labour wing: P. Gowtham Reddy
- Peasant's wing: M. V. S. Nagi Reddy
- Ideology: Telugu nationalism Regionalism; Social liberalism Secularism; Populism
- Political position: Centre to centre-left
- Colours: Blue (mostly); White; Green
- ECI status: State party
- Seats in Rajya Sabha: 4 / 245
- Seats in Lok Sabha: 4 / 543
- Seats in Andhra Pradesh: 33 / 58 (Legislative Council); 11 / 175 (Legislative Assembly)
- Number of states and union territories in government: 0 / 31

Election symbol
- Ceiling Fan

Party flag

Website
- ysrcongress.com

The Yuvajana Sramika Rythu Congress Party (YSRCP; lit. 'Youth, Labour, and Farmer Congress Party'), often shortened to simply the YSR Congress Party, is an Indian regional political party based in the state of Andhra Pradesh. The party was initially registered with Election Commission of India by Kolishetti Shiva Kumar. Thereafter, the party was taken over by its current president, Y. S. Jagan Mohan Reddy, having served as the state's chief minister from 2019–2024. It currently has 4 seats in the Lok Sabha.

== Origins ==
After the sudden death of the then-incumbent Chief minister of Andhra Pradesh, Y. S. Rajasekhara Reddy (YSR) in a helicopter crash in September 2009, his son, Y. S. Jagan Mohan Reddy, the incumbent MP from Kadapa requested Sonia Gandhi to make him chief minister but party denied his request. Just to fulfill Jagan's promise he started an Odarpu Yatra (condolence tour) across Andhra Pradesh, to console the families of those who committed suicide or died of shock after the death of his father. The tour was not supported by the Congress leadership. Defying the Congress Working Committee's order to call off the tour, Jagan went ahead with the first leg of the "Odarpu Yatra" in the West Godavari and Khammam districts in April 2010.

Meanwhile, Sakshi TV news channel and Sakshi newspaper, which are closely affiliated with YSR and Jagan, had been continuously criticizing the new Chief Minister Konijeti Rosaiah and the Congress leadership at New Delhi. In a special programme on Sakshi TV to mark the 125th-anniversary celebrations of the Congress party, a voice-over made remarks on Sonia Gandhi and the Prime Minister Manmohan Singh on the "current state of affairs" in the state, which invited anger and protests from the Congress loyalists and increased the gap and friction between Jagan and the Congress loyalists. The channel later omitted those remarks in a re-telecast.

After accusing the Congress of ill-treating him and with a state ministerial slot in the aftermath of the death of his father, Jagan and his mother, Y. S. Vijayamma, resigned from the Kadapa Lok Sabha and Pulivendula Assembly constituencies respectively and also as members of the Congress in November 2010. Many Congress leaders loyal to Jagan also quit the party and joined the YSR Congress. This resulted in the weakening of Congress in both the assembly and Lok Sabha, necessitating by-elections. Initially the party was set up by K. Shiva Kumar, a fan of YSR. After the rift with congress Y. S. Jagan acquired YSRCP and took complete responsibilities from Shiva Kumar., and later, after few years, Jagan expelled the party founder and took the complete control of the party.

== Electoral performance ==
In the ensuing by-elections, after the formation of the party, it won most of the vacated seats with many of the Indian National Congress (governing party) and the Telugu Desam Party (the main opposition) candidates losing their deposits. In March 2012, YSR Congress won the Kovur Assembly seat in Nellore district in a by-election.

In 2012 by-polls were held for 18 assembly constituencies which are: Parkal, Narsannapeta, Payakaraopet, Ramachandrapuram, Narasapuram, Polavaram (ST), Prathipadu (SC), Macherla, Ongole, Udayagiri, Rajampet, Kodur (SC), Rayachoti, Allagadda, Yemmiganur, Rayadurg, Anantapur Urban and Tirupati.

On 15 June 2012, YSR Congress won the Nellore Lok Sabha seat and 15 of 18 assembly seats in Andhra Pradesh. YSRCP leaders P. Subhash Chandra Bose from Ramachandrapuram of East Godavari district and Konda Surekha from Parkal of Warangal district, both Ministers in the YSR cabinet, had switched to YSR Congress party but lost their races.

It lost the 2014 Andhra Pradesh Legislative Assembly election to the Telugu Desam Party, which had previously been in opposition to the INC government. One-third of the MLAs who won for the YSR Congress in the 2014 Elections had joined the Telugu Desam Party by 2017.

It went for 2019 Andhra Pradesh Legislative Assembly election in 2019 emerged as the 5th largest political party in India. It did not contest in 2018 Telangana Legislative Assembly election.

The party won the 2019 Andhra Pradesh Legislative Assembly election in a landslide, winning 151 of the 175 seats, including a clean sweep in Vizianagaram Kadapa, Kurnool and Nellore districts. It was in government from 30 May 2019 to 2024 having 151 members in the 175-member state assembly. In addition to it, the party had 22 members in the Lok Sabha out of 25 in AP based on the election results declared on 23 May 2019.

The party lost the 2024 Andhra Pradesh Legislative Assembly election to the NDA alliance, securing only 11 out of 175 seats in the state legislative assembly even failing to secure the opposition status as the party didn't secure at least 10% seats.

=== Andhra Pradesh Legislative Assembly ===
Election Year	Assembly	Party leader	Seats contested	Seats won	Overall votes	(%) of votes	(+/-) in seats	Vote swing	Outcome
Andhra Pradesh Legislative Assembly
2014	14th	Y. S. Jagan Mohan Reddy	266	70 / 294	13,494,076	27.88%	▲70	new	Opposition
2019	15th	Y. S. Jagan Mohan Reddy	175	151 / 175	15,688,569	49.95%	▲81	▲22.07	Government
2024	16th	Y. S. Jagan Mohan Reddy	175	11 / 175	13,284,134	39.37%	▼140	▼10.58	Others

All time–YSRCP Assembly seat count (Andhra Pradesh)

=== Lok Sabha electoral performance ===
Election Year	Lok Sabha	Party leader	Seats contested	Seats won	Overall votes	(%) of votes	(+/-) in seats	Vote swing	Outcome
Lok Sabha
2014	16th	Y. S. Jagan Mohan Reddy	42	9 / 543	13,995,435	29.14%	▲9	new	Others
2019	17th	Y. S. Jagan Mohan Reddy	25	22 / 543	15,537,006	49.89%	▲13	▲20.75	Others
2024	18th	Y. S. Jagan Mohan Reddy	25	4 / 543	13,174,874	39.61%	▼18	▼10.28	Others

All time–YSRCP Lok Sabha seat count

== List of party leaders ==
In 2022, the Election Commission of India (ECI) sought clarification from the YSR Congress Party regarding the reports announcing Y. S. Jagan Mohan Reddy as the permanent president of the party. The ECI expressed its displeasure and concern over this potential adoption by the party, citing it as an anti-democratic move.

=== President ===
No.	Portrait	Name (Birth–Death)	Term in office		
No.	Portrait	Name (Birth–Death)	Assumed office	Left office	Time in office
1		Y. S. Jagan Mohan Reddy (born 1972)	12 March 2011	Incumbent	15 years, 254 days

=== Chairperson ===
No.	Portrait	Name (Birth–Death)	Term in office		
No.	Portrait	Name (Birth–Death)	Assumed office	Left office	Time in office
1		Y. S. Vijayamma (born 1956)	12 March 2011	5 May 2022	11 years, 71 days

== Legislative leaders ==
=== List of chief ministers ===
==== Chief Ministers of Andhra Pradesh ====
No.	Portrait	Name (Birth–Death)	Term in office			Assembly (Election)	Constituency	Ministry
No.	Portrait	Name (Birth–Death)	Assumed office	Left office	Time in office	Assembly (Election)	Constituency	Ministry
1		Y. S. Jagan Mohan Reddy (born 1972)	30 May 2019	11 June 2024	5 years, 13 days	15th (2019)	Pulivendula	Jagan

=== List of deputy chief ministers ===
Image	Name (MLA/MLC) [Constituency]	Term in Office		Time in Office	Portfolio(s)
Image	Name (MLA/MLC) [Constituency]	Took Office	Left Office	Time in Office	Portfolio(s)
	Amzath Basha Shaik Bepari (MLA for Kadapa)	8 June 2019	11 June 2024	5 years, 3 days	Minority Welfare
	K. Narayana Swamy (MLA for Gangadhara Nellore)	8 June 2019	11 June 2024	5 years, 3 days	Commercial Taxes; Excise
	Alla Nani (born 1969) (MLA for Eluru)	8 June 2019	7 April 2022	2 years, 303 days	Health; Family Welfare; Medical Education
	Pushpasreevani Pamula (born 1986) (MLA for Kurupam)	8 June 2019	7 April 2022	2 years, 303 days	Tribal Welfare
	Pilli Subhash Chandra Bose (MLC)	8 June 2019	18 June 2020	1 year, 10 days	Revenue; Registration; Stamps
	Dharmana Krishna Das (MLA for Narasannapeta)	22 July 2020	7 April 2022	1 year, 259 days	Roads & Buildings; Revenue; Registrations & Stamps
	Budi Mutyala Naidu (MLA for Madugula)	11 April 2022	11 June 2024	2 years, 61 days	Panchayat Raj; Rural Development; Gram Volunteers / Ward Volunteers; Village Secretariats / Ward Secretaries (Panchayats Jurisdiction)
	Kottu Satyanarayana (MLA for Tadepalligudem)	11 April 2022	11 June 2024	2 years, 61 days	Endowments
	Rajanna Dora Peedika (MLA for Salur)	11 April 2022	11 June 2024	2 years, 61 days	Tribal Welfare

== Lok Sabha Members ==
Election Year	Portrait	Member of Parliament	Constituency	State
18th Lok Sabha
2024		Y. S. Avinash Reddy	Kadapa	Andhra Pradesh
2024		Maddila Gurumoorthy	Tirupati (SC)	Andhra Pradesh
2024		P. V. Midhun Reddy	Rajampet	Andhra Pradesh
2024		Gumma Thanuja Rani	Araku (SC)	Andhra Pradesh
17th Lok Sabha
2019		Goddeti Madhavi	Araku (ST)	Andhra Pradesh
2019		Bellana Chandra Sekhar	Vizianagaram	Andhra Pradesh
2019		M. V. V. Satyanarayana	Visakhapatnam	Andhra Pradesh
2019		Beesetti Venkata Satyavathi	Anakapalli	Andhra Pradesh
2019		Vanga Geetha	Kakinada	Andhra Pradesh
2019		Chinta Anuradha	Amalapuram (SC)	Andhra Pradesh
2019		Margani Bharat	Rajahmundry	Andhra Pradesh
2019		Raghu Rama Krishna Raju	Narasapuram	Andhra Pradesh
2019		Kotagiri Sridhar	Eluru	Andhra Pradesh
2019		Vallabhaneni Balasouri	Machilipatnam	Andhra Pradesh
2019		Lavu Sri Krishna Devarayalu (Resigned on 24 January 2024)	Narasaraopet	Andhra Pradesh
2019		Nandigam Suresh	Bapatla (SC)	Andhra Pradesh
2019		Magunta Sreenivasulu Reddy	Ongole	Andhra Pradesh
2019		Pocha Brahmananda Reddy	Nandyal	Andhra Pradesh
2019		Sanjeev Kumar (Resigned on 10 January 2024)	Kurnool	Andhra Pradesh
2019		Talari Rangaiah	Anantapur	Andhra Pradesh
2019		Kuruva Gorantla Madhav	Hindupur	Andhra Pradesh
2019		Y. S. Avinash Reddy	Kadapa	Andhra Pradesh
2019		Adala Prabhakara Reddy	Nellore	Andhra Pradesh
2019		Balli Durga Prasad Rao (Died on 16 September 2020)	Tirupati (SC)	Andhra Pradesh
2019		Maddila Gurumoorthy (Elected on 2 May 2021)	Tirupati (SC)	Andhra Pradesh
2019		P. V. Midhun Reddy	Rajampet	Andhra Pradesh
2019		N. Reddeppa	Chittoor (SC)	Andhra Pradesh
16th Lok Sabha
2014		Ponguleti Srinivasa Reddy	Khammam	Telangana
2014		Kothapalli Geetha	Araku (ST)	Andhra Pradesh
2014		Y. V. Subba Reddy (resigned on 20 June 2018)	Ongole	Andhra Pradesh
2014		S. P. Y. Reddy (Died on 30 April 2019)	Nandyal	Andhra Pradesh
2014		Butta Renuka	Kurnool	Andhra Pradesh
2014		Y. S. Avinash Reddy (resigned on 20 June 2018)	Kadapa	Andhra Pradesh
2014		Mekapati Rajamohan Reddy (resigned on 20 June 2018)	Nellore	Andhra Pradesh
2014		Varaprasad Rao Velagapalli (resigned on 20 June 2018)	Tirupati (SC)	Andhra Pradesh
2014		P. V. Midhun Reddy (resigned on 20 June 2018)	Rajampet	Andhra Pradesh
15th Lok Sabha
2011		Y. S. Jagan Mohan Reddy (elected on 13 May 2011)	Kadapa	Andhra Pradesh
2012		Mekapati Rajamohan Reddy (elected on 15 June 2012)	Nellore	Andhra Pradesh

== List of Rajya Sabha Members ==
No	Name	Date of Appointment	Date of Retirement
1	Y. V. Subba Reddy	02-Apr-2024	01-Apr-2030
2	Golla Babu Rao	02-Apr-2024	01-Apr-2030
3	Meda Raghunadha Reddy	02-Apr-2024	01-Apr-2030
4	S. Niranjan Reddy	22-Jun-2022	21-Jun-2028

== See also ==
- List of political parties in India
- List of Indian National Congress breakaway parties
- Telugu Desam Party
- Janasena Party
