= Andhra Pradesh (1956–2014) =

Former state in India with Hyderabad as its capital

United Andhra Pradesh Āndhra Pradēś
- Former State of India
- 1956–2014
- Coat of arms

- Map of the United Andhra Pradesh
- Capital: Hyderabad
- Area
  - until 2014: 275,039 km^{2} (106,193 sq mi)
- Population
  - 2011 Census: 84,665,533
- Government
  - Type: Federated state
- Chief Minister
  - 1956–1960: Neelam Sanjiva Reddy (First)
  - 2010–2014: Nallari Kiran Kumar Reddy (Last)
- Governor
  - 1956–1957: Chandulal Madhavlal Trivedi (First)
  - 2009–2014: E. S. L. Narasimhan (Last)
- History
  - State established: 1 November 1956
  - State bifurcated: 02 June 2014
Preceded by	Succeeded by
Andhra State; Hyderabad State (1948–1956)	Andhra Pradesh; Telangana

Andhra State (1953–1956)

Hyderabad State (1948–1956)

Andhra Pradesh (retrospectively referred to as United Andhra Pradesh or Undivided Andhra Pradesh) from 1956 comprised the present day Indian state of the same name and Telangana until its division into the two states in 2014.

== Creation of United Andhra Pradesh ==
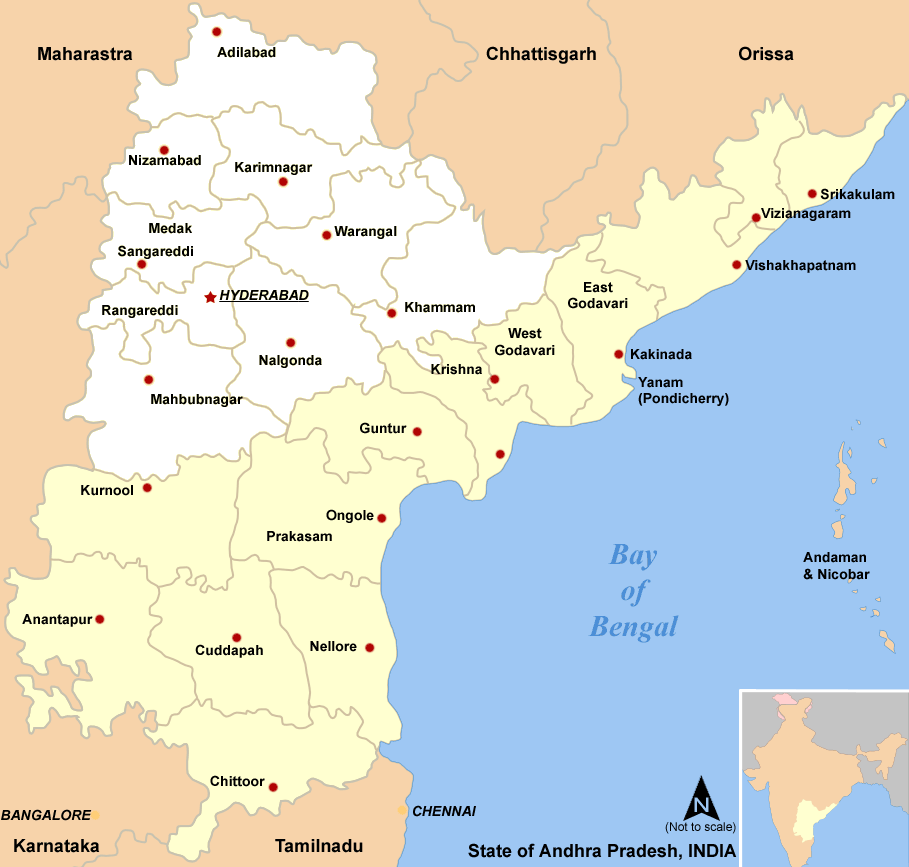
Andhra State (yellow), which merged with Hyderabad state (white) to form the State of Andhra Pradesh in 1956

Map of Southern India (1953–1956) before the States Reorganisation Act of 1956

To gain an independent state based on linguistic identity, and to protect the interests of the Telugu people of Madras State, Potti Sreeramulu fasted to death in 1952. As Madras became a bone of contention, in 1949 a JVP committee report stated: "Andhra Province could be formed provided the Andhras give up their claim on the city of Madras (now Chennai)". After Potti Sreeramulu's death, the Telugu-speaking area of Andhra State was carved out of Madras State on 30 November 1953, with Kurnool as its capital city. On the basis of the gentlemen's agreement of 1 November 1956, the States Reorganisation Act formed Andhra Pradesh by merging Andhra State with the Telugu-speaking areas of the then-existing Hyderabad State. Hyderabad was made the capital of the new state. The Marathi-speaking areas of Hyderabad State merged with Bombay State which later bifurcated in Gujarat and Maharashtra and the Kannada-speaking areas were merged with Mysore State which was later renamed as Karnataka.

In February 2014, the Andhra Pradesh Reorganisation Act, 2014 bill was passed by the Parliament of India for the formation of the Telangana state comprising ten districts. Hyderabad will remain as a joint capital for not exceeding ten years. The new state of Telangana came into existence on 2 June 2014 after approval from the President of India. Number of petitions questioning the validity of Andhra Pradesh Reorganisation Act, 2014 have long been pending for the verdict since April 2014 before the supreme court constitutional bench.

The Visalandhra, Vishalandhra or Vishala Andhra was a movement in post-independence India for a united state for all Telugu speakers, a Greater Andhra (Telugu: విశాలాంధ్ర Viśālāndhra). This movement was led by the Communist Party of India under the banner of Andhra Mahasabha with a demand to merge all the Telugu-speaking areas into one state. (The Communist Party of India demanded the formation of similar linguistic states across India.) The movement succeeded and a separate state of Andhra Pradesh was formed by merging Telugu-speaking areas of Hyderabad State (Telangana) with Andhra State on 1 November 1956 as part of the States Reorganisation Act. (Andhra State had been previously carved out of Madras State on 1 October 1953.) However, on 2 June 2014, Telangana State separated again from Andhra Pradesh and the Vishalandhra movement came to an end. The residual Andhra Pradesh now has approximately the same borders but lost Bhadrachalam Town,Nuguru Taluk: Now known as the Venkatapuram and Wazeedu areas which are initially from East Godavari district of Andhra Pradesh

=== History ===
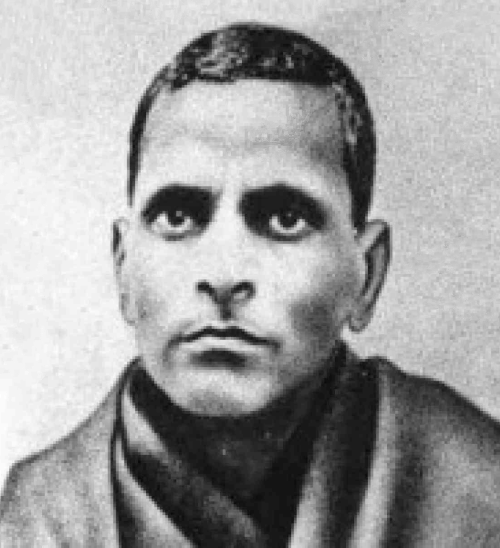
Potti Sreeramulu, whose fast unto death in 1952 led to the formation of Andhra State

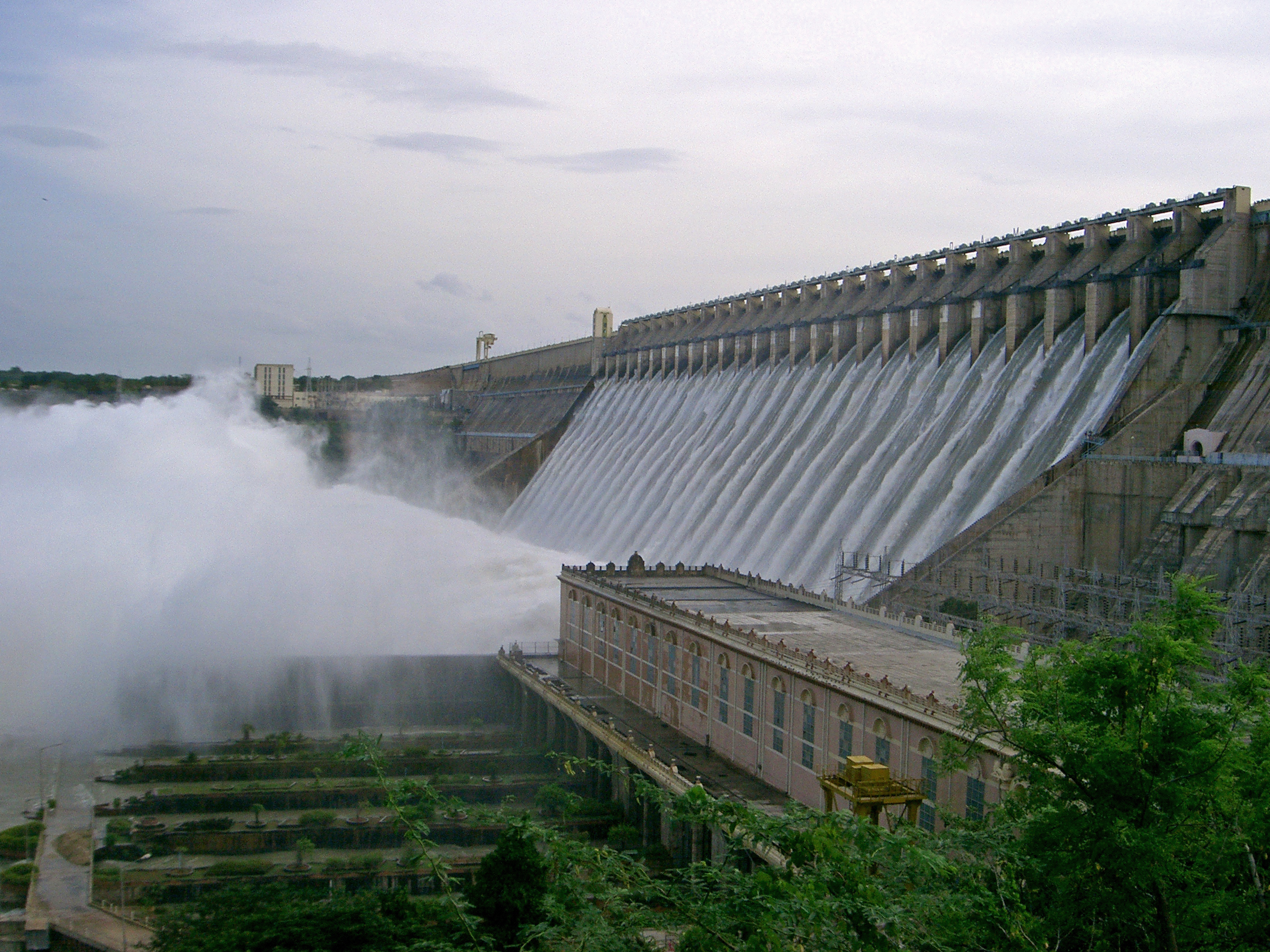
Nagarjuna Sagar Dam (completed in 1967)

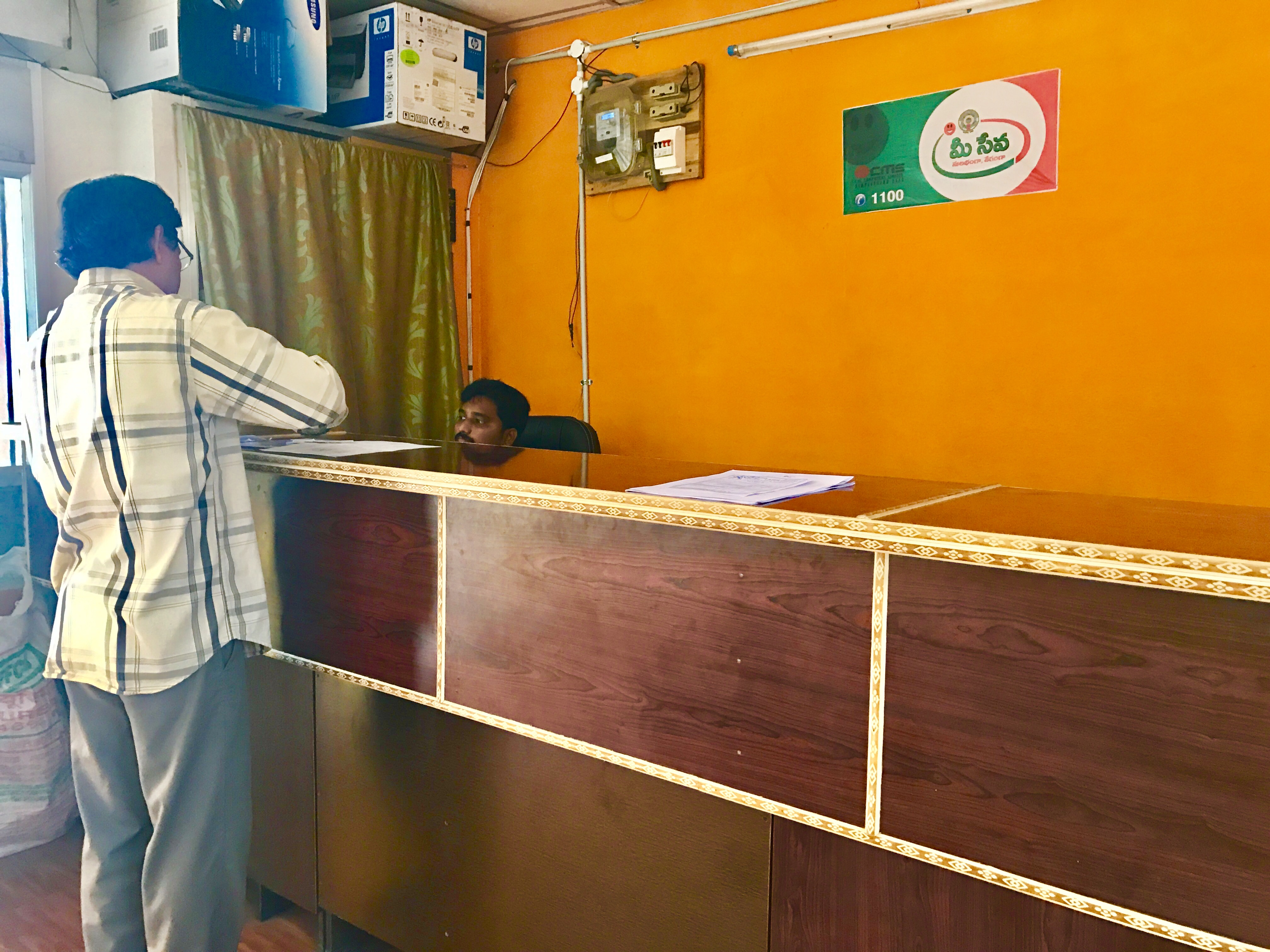
Mee Seva office (initial launch of the E-Seva Project in 2001)

To gain an independent state based on linguistic identity and to protect the interests of the Telugu-speaking people of Madras State, Potti Sreeramulu fasted to death in 1952. As the city of Madras became a bone of contention, in 1949 a committee with Jawaharlal Nehru, Vallabhbhai Patel, and Pattabhi Sitaramayya was constituted. The committee recommended that Andhra State could be formed provided the Andhras gave up their claim on the city of Madras (now Chennai). After Potti Sreeramulu's death, the Telugu-speaking area of Andhra State was carved out of Madras State on 1 October 1953, with Kurnool as its capital city. Tanguturi Prakasam became the first chief minister. Based on the Gentlemen's Agreement of 1956,and as per the request of Hyderabad state leaders,the States Reorganisation Act created Andhra Pradesh by merging the neighbouring Telugu-speaking areas of the Hyderabad State with Hyderabad as the capital on 1 November 1956.

The Indian National Congress (INC) ruled the state from 1956 to 1982. Neelam Sanjiva Reddy became the first chief minister. Among other chief ministers, P. V. Narasimha Rao is known for implementing land reforms and land ceiling acts and securing a reservation for lower castes in politics. Nagarjuna Sagar Dam, completed in 1967, and Srisailam Dam, completed in 1981, are some of the irrigation projects that helped increase the production of paddy in the state.

In 1983, the Telugu Desam Party (TDP) won the state elections, and N. T. Rama Rao became the chief minister of the state for the first time after launching his party just nine months earlier. This broke the long-time single-party monopoly enjoyed by the INC. He transformed the sub-district administration by forming mandals in place of earlier taluks, removing hereditary village heads, and appointing non-hereditary village revenue assistants. The 1989 elections ended the rule of Rao, with the INC returning to power with Marri Chenna Reddy at the helm. In 1994, Andhra Pradesh gave a mandate to the Telugu Desam Party again, and Rao became the chief minister again. Nara Chandrababu Naidu, Rao's son-in-law, came to power in 1995 with the backing of a majority of the MLAs. The Telugu Desam Party won both the assembly and Lok Sabha elections in 1999 under the leadership of Chandrababu Naidu. Thus, Naidu held the record for the longest-serving chief minister (1995–2004) of the united Andhra Pradesh. He introduced e-governance by launching e-Seva centres in 2001 for paperless and speedy delivery of government services. He is credited with transforming Hyderabad into an IT hub by providing incentives for tech companies to set up centres.

In 2004, Congress returned to power with a new chief ministerial face, YS Rajashekara Reddy, better known as YSR. The main emphasis during Reddy's tenure was on social welfare schemes such as free electricity for farmers, health insurance, tuition fee reimbursement for the poor, and the national rural employment guarantee scheme. He took over the free emergency ambulance service initiated by a corporation and ran it as a government project. INC won the 2009 elections under the leadership of YSR in April. He was elected chief minister again but was killed in a helicopter crash that occurred in September 2009. He was succeeded by Congressmen Konijeti Rosaiah and Nallari Kiran Kumar Reddy; the latter resigned over the impending division of the state to form Telangana.

During its 58 years as a unified state, the state weathered separatist movements from Telangana (1969) and Andhra (1972) successfully. A new party called Telangana Rashtra Samithi, formed in April 2001 by Kalvakuntla Chandrashekar Rao (KCR), reignited the Telangana movement. A joint action committee formed with political parties, government employees, and the general public spearheaded the agitation. When KCR's health deteriorated due to his fast-unto-death undertaking, the central government decided to initiate the process of forming an independent Telangana in December 2009. This triggered the Samaikyandhra movement to keep the state united. The Srikrishna committee was formed to give recommendations on how to deal with the situation. It gave its report in December 2010. The agitations continued for nearly 5 years, with the Telangana side harping on the marginalisation of food culture, language, and unequal economic development and the Samaikyandhra movement focusing on the shared culture, language, customs, and historical unity of Telugu-speaking regions. The Andhra Pradesh Reorganisation Act bill was passed by the parliament of India for the formation of the Telangana state, comprising ten districts, despite opposition by the state legislature. The bill included the provision to retain Hyderabad as the capital for up to ten years and the provision to ensure access to educational institutions for the same period. The bill received the assent of the president and was published in the gazette on 1 March 2014. The new state of Telangana came into existence on 2 June 2014 after approval from the president of India, with the residual state continuing as Andhra Pradesh. The present form of Andhra Pradesh is the same as that of Andhra State, except for Bhadrachalam town, which continues in Telangana. A number of petitions questioning the validity of the Andhra Pradesh Reorganisation Act have been pending before the Supreme Court constitutional bench since April 2014.

In the final elections held in the unified state in 2014, the TDP got a mandate in its favour, defeating its nearest rival, the YSR Congress Party, a breakaway faction of the Congress founded by Y. S. Jagan Mohan Reddy, son of former Chief Minister Y. S. Rajasekhara Reddy. N. Chandrababu Naidu, the chief of the TDP, became the chief minister on 8 June 2014. In 2017, the government of Andhra Pradesh began operating from its new greenfield capital, Amaravati, for which 33,000 acres were acquired from farmers through an innovative land pooling scheme. Interstate issues with Telangana relating to the division of assets of public sector institutions and organisations of the united state and the division of river waters are not yet resolved.

=== United Andhra Pradesh demographics ===
Historical population
Year	Pop.	±%
1961	35,983,000	—
1971	43,503,000	+20.9%
1981	53,550,000	+23.1%
1991	66,508,000	+24.2%
2001	75,727,000	+13.9%
2011	84,665,533	+11.8%
Includes Telangana. Source: Census of India

== List of governors ==
Data from Andhra Pradesh State Portal.

#	Portrait	Governor (Birth–Death)	Term of the office			Home state	Previous post	Appointed by
#	Portrait	Governor (Birth–Death)	Assumed office	Left office	Time in office	Home state	Previous post	Appointed by
1		Chandulal Madhavlal Trivedi (1893–1980)	1 November 1956	31 July 1957	272 days	Gujarat	Governor of Andhra state	Rajendra Prasad
2		Bhim Sen Sachar (1894–1978)	1 August 1957	7 September 1962	5 years, 37 days	Punjab	Governor of Odisha	Rajendra Prasad
3		S. M. Shrinagesh (1903–1977)	8 September 1962	3 May 1964	1 year, 238 days	Maharashtra	Governor of Assam	Sarvepalli Radhakrishnan
4	Pattom_A._Thanu_Pillai_(image)	Pattom A. Thanu Pillai (1885–1970)	4 May 1964	10 April 1968	3 years, 342 days	Kerala	Governor of Punjab	Sarvepalli Radhakrishnan
5		Khandubhai Kasanji Desai (1898–1975)	11 April 1968	25 January 1975	6 years, 289 days	Gujarat	Minister of Labour	Zakir Husain
6	–	S. Obul Reddy (1916–1996)	25 January 1975	9 January 1976	349 days	Andhra Pradesh	Chief Justice of the Andhra Pradesh High Court	Fakhruddin Ali Ahmed
7		Mohan Lal Sukhadia (1916–1982)	10 January 1976	15 June 1976	157 days	Rajasthan	Governor of Karnataka	Fakhruddin Ali Ahmed
8		Ramchandra Dhondiba Bhandare (1916–1988)	16 June 1976	16 February 1977	245 days	Maharashtra	Governor of Bihar	Fakhruddin Ali Ahmed
9	–	B. J. Divan (1919–2012)	17 February 1977	4 May 1977	76 days	Gujarat	Chief Justice of the Andhra Pradesh High Court	B. D. Jatti (acting)
10		Sharda Mukherjee (1919–2007)	5 May 1977	14 August 1978	1 year, 101 days	Maharashtra	Member of Parliament, Lok Sabha	B. D. Jatti (acting)
11	–	K. C. Abraham (1899–1986)	15 August 1978	14 August 1983	4 years, 364 days	Kerala	Member of the Indian National Congress	Neelam Sanjiva Reddy
12		Thakur Ram Lal (1929–2002)	15 August 1983	29 August 1984	1 year, 14 days	Himachal Pradesh	Chief Minister of Himachal Pradesh	Giani Zail Singh
13		Shankar Dayal Sharma (1918–1999)	29 August 1984	26 November 1985	1 year, 89 days	Madhya Pradesh	President of the Indian National Congress	Giani Zail Singh
14		Kumudben Joshi (1934–2022)	26 November 1985	7 February 1990	4 years, 73 days	Gujarat	Deputy Minister of Health and Family Welfare	Giani Zail Singh
15		Krishan Kant (1927–2002)	7 February 1990	21 August 1997	7 years, 195 days	Gujarat	Member of Parliament, Lok Sabha	R. Venkataraman
Acting	–	Gopala Ramanujam (1915–2001)	22 August 1997	23 November 1997	93 days	Tamil Nadu	Governor of Odisha	K. R. Narayanan
16		C. Rangarajan (1932–)	24 November 1997	3 January 2003	5 years, 40 days	Tamil Nadu	Governor of the Reserve Bank of India	K. R. Narayanan
17		Surjit Singh Barnala (1925–2017)	3 January 2003	3 November 2004	1 year, 305 days	Punjab	Governor of Uttarakhand	A. P. J. Abdul Kalam
18		Sushilkumar Shinde (1941–)	4 November 2004	29 January 2006	1 year, 86 days	Maharashtra	Chief Minister of Maharashtra	A. P. J. Abdul Kalam
Acting		Rameshwar Thakur (1925–2015)	29 January 2006	22 August 2007	1 year, 205 days	Jharkhand	Governor of Odisha	A. P. J. Abdul Kalam
19		N. D. Tiwari (1925–2018)	22 August 2007	27 December 2009	2 years, 127 days	Uttar Pradesh	Chief Minister of Uttarakhand	Pratibha Patil
Acting		E. S. L. Narasimhan (1945–)	27 December 2009	22 January 2010	9 years, 208 days	Tamil Nadu	Governor of Chhattisgarh	Pratibha Patil
20		E. S. L. Narasimhan (1945–)	23 January 2010	1 June 2014	9 years, 208 days	Tamil Nadu	Governor of Chhattisgarh	Pratibha Patil

== List of chief ministers ==
On 1 November 1956, Hyderabad State ceased to exist; its Gulbarga and Aurangabad divisions were merged into Mysore State and Bombay State respectively. Its remaining Telugu-speaking portion, Telangana, was merged with Andhra State to form the new state of United Andhra Pradesh. Sanjiva Reddy was the first chief minister.

Neelam Sanjiva Reddy of Indian National Congress was the first chief minister of United Andhra Pradesh, N. Chandrababu Naidu of Telugu Desam Party was the longest served chief minister and Bhaskar Rao was the shortest serving both belonging to TDP. Kiran Kumar Reddy of the Indian National Congress was the last chief minister of United Andhra Pradesh.

#	Portrait	Chief Minister (Lifespan) Constituency	Term of office			Election (Term)	Party	Government	Appointed by (Governor)
#	Portrait	Chief Minister (Lifespan) Constituency	Term start	Term end	Duration	Election (Term)	Party	Government	Appointed by (Governor)
1		Neelam Sanjiva Reddy (1913–1996); MLA for Srikalahasti	1 November 1956	11 January 1960	3 years, 71 days	1955 (1st)	Indian National Congress భారత జాతీయ కాంగ్రెస్సు పక్షము	Neelam I	Chandulal Madhavlal Trivedi
1		Neelam Sanjiva Reddy (1913–1996); MLA for Srikalahasti	1 November 1956	11 January 1960	3 years, 71 days	1957 (2nd)	Indian National Congress భారత జాతీయ కాంగ్రెస్సు పక్షము	Neelam II	Chandulal Madhavlal Trivedi
2		Damodaram Sanjivayya (1921–1972); MLA for Kurnool	11 January 1960	12 March 1962	2 years, 60 days	1957 (2nd)	Indian National Congress భారత జాతీయ కాంగ్రెస్సు పక్షము	Sanjivayya	Bhim Sen Sachar
(1)		Neelam Sanjiva Reddy (1913–1996); MLA for Dhone	12 March 1962	21 February 1964	1 year, 346 days	1962 (3rd)	Indian National Congress భారత జాతీయ కాంగ్రెస్సు పక్షము	Neelam III	Bhim Sen Sachar
3		Kasu Brahmananda Reddy (1909–1994); MLA for Narasaraopet	21 February 1964	30 September 1971	7 years, 221 days	1962 (3rd)	Indian National Congress భారత జాతీయ కాంగ్రెస్సు పక్షము	Kasu I	Satyawant Mallannah Shrinagesh
3		Kasu Brahmananda Reddy (1909–1994); MLA for Narasaraopet	21 February 1964	30 September 1971	7 years, 221 days	1967 (4th)	Indian National Congress భారత జాతీయ కాంగ్రెస్సు పక్షము	Kasu II	Pattom A. Thanu Pillai
4		Pamulaparthi Venkata Narasimha Rao (1921–2004); MLA for Manthani	30 September 1971	10 January 1973	1 year, 102 days	1972 (5th)	Indian National Congress (Requisitionists) భారత జాతీయ కాంగ్రెస్సు పక్షము (ఇందిరమ్మ)	Narasimha	Khandubhai Kasanji Desai
President's rule అధ్యక్ష పాలన imposed during the period (11 January 1973 – 10 December 1973) (Note: President's rule may be imposed when the "government in a state is not able to function as per the Constitution", which often happens because no party or coalition has a majority in the assembly. When the President's rule is in force in a state, its council of ministers stands dissolved. The office of chief minister thus lies vacant, and the administration is taken over by the governor, who functions on behalf of the central government. At times, the legislative assembly also stands dissolved.)
5		Jalagam Vengala Rao (1921–1999); MLA for Vemsoor	10 December 1973	6 March 1978	4 years, 86 days	1972 (5th)	Indian National Congress (Requisitionists) భారత జాతీయ కాంగ్రెస్సు పక్షము (ఇందిరమ్మ)	Jalagam	Khandubhai Kasanji Desai
6		Marri Chenna Reddy (1919–1996); MLA for Medchal	6 March 1978	11 October 1980	2 years, 219 days	1978 (6th)	Indian National Congress (Indira) భారత జాతీయ కాంగ్రెస్సు పక్షము (ఇందిరమ్మ)	Marri I	Sharda Mukherjee
7		Tanguturi Anjaiah (1919–1986); MLC	11 October 1980	24 February 1982	1 year, 136 days	1978 (6th)	Indian National Congress (Indira) భారత జాతీయ కాంగ్రెస్సు పక్షము (ఇందిరమ్మ)	Anjaiah	K. C. Abraham
8		Bhavanam Venkata Ramireddy (1931–2002); MLC	24 February 1982	20 September 1982	208 days	1978 (6th)	Indian National Congress (Indira) భారత జాతీయ కాంగ్రెస్సు పక్షము (ఇందిరమ్మ)	Bhavanam	K. C. Abraham
9		Kotla Vijaya Bhaskara Reddy (1920–2001); MLA for Kurnool	20 September 1982	9 January 1983	111 days	1978 (6th)	Indian National Congress (Indira) భారత జాతీయ కాంగ్రెస్సు పక్షము (ఇందిరమ్మ)	Kotla I	K. C. Abraham
10		Nandamuri Taraka Rama Rao (1923–1996); MLA for Tirupati	9 January 1983	16 August 1984	1 year, 220 days	1983 (7th)	Telugu Desam Party తెలుగుదేశం పక్షము	Rao I	K. C. Abraham
11		Nadendla Bhaskara Rao (born 1935); MLA for Vemuru	16 August 1984	16 September 1984	31 days	1983 (7th)	Telugu Desam Party (Rebel) తెలుగుదేశం పక్షము (తిరుగుబాటుదారు)	Nadendla	Thakur Ram Lal
(10)		Nandamuri Taraka Rama Rao (1923–1996); MLA for Tirupati 1984–1985; MLA for Hindupuram 1985–1989	16 September 1984	9 March 1985	174 days	1983 (7th)	Telugu Desam Party తెలుగుదేశం పక్షము	Rao II	Shankar Dayal Sharma
(10)		Nandamuri Taraka Rama Rao (1923–1996); MLA for Tirupati 1984–1985; MLA for Hindupuram 1985–1989	9 March 1985	3 December 1989	4 years, 269 days	1985 (8th)	Telugu Desam Party తెలుగుదేశం పక్షము	Rao III	Shankar Dayal Sharma
(6)		Marri Chenna Reddy (1919–1996); MLA for Sanathnagar	3 December 1989	17 December 1990	1 year, 14 days	1989 (9th)	Indian National Congress (Indira) భారత జాతీయ కాంగ్రెస్సు పక్షము (ఇందిరమ్మ)	Marri II	Kumudben Joshi
12		Nedurumalli Janardhana Reddy (1935–2014); MLA for Venkatagiri	17 December 1990	9 October 1992	1 year, 297 days	1989 (9th)	Indian National Congress (Indira) భారత జాతీయ కాంగ్రెస్సు పక్షము (ఇందిరమ్మ)	Janardhana	Krishan Kant
(9)		Kotla Vijaya Bhaskara Reddy (1920–2001); MLA for Panyam	9 October 1992	12 December 1994	2 years, 64 days	1989 (9th)	Indian National Congress (Indira) భారత జాతీయ కాంగ్రెస్సు పక్షము (ఇందిరమ్మ)	Kotla II	Krishan Kant
(10)		Nandamuri Taraka Rama Rao (1923–1996); MLA for Hindupuram	12 December 1994	1 September 1995	263 days	1994 (10th)	Telugu Desam Party తెలుగుదేశం పక్షము	Rao IV	Krishan Kant
13		Nara Chandrababu Naidu (born 1950); MLA for Kuppam	1 September 1995	11 October 1999	4 years, 40 days	1994 (10th)	Telugu Desam Party తెలుగుదేశం పక్షము	Naidu I	Krishan Kant
13		Nara Chandrababu Naidu (born 1950); MLA for Kuppam	11 October 1999	14 May 2004	4 years, 216 days	1999 (11th)	Telugu Desam Party తెలుగుదేశం పక్షము	Naidu II	C. Rangarajan
14		Yeduguri Sandinti Rajasekhara Reddy (1949–2009); MLA for Pulivendla	14 May 2004	20 May 2009	5 years, 6 days	2004 (12th)	Indian National Congress భారత జాతీయ కాంగ్రెస్సు పక్షము	Reddy I	Surjit Singh Barnala
14		Yeduguri Sandinti Rajasekhara Reddy (1949–2009); MLA for Pulivendla	20 May 2009	2 September 2009	105 days	2009 (13th)	Indian National Congress భారత జాతీయ కాంగ్రెస్సు పక్షము	Reddy II	N. D. Tiwari
15		Konijeti Rosaiah (1933–2021); MLC	3 September 2009	25 November 2010	1 year, 83 days	2009 (13th)	Indian National Congress భారత జాతీయ కాంగ్రెస్సు పక్షము	Rosaiah	N. D. Tiwari
16		Nallari Kiran Kumar Reddy (born 1959); MLA for Pileru	25 November 2010	1 March 2014	3 years, 96 days	2009 (13th)	Indian National Congress భారత జాతీయ కాంగ్రెస్సు పక్షము	Kiran	E. S. L. Narasimhan
President's rule అధ్యక్ష పాలన imposed during the period (1 March 2014 – 1 June 2014) (Note: After 58 years, the state was bifurcated into Andhra Pradesh and Telangana states on 2 June 2014 by Andhra Pradesh Reorganisation Act, 2014. After state reorganisation, Andhra Pradesh Sasana sabha seats come down from 294 to 175 seats.)

== List of Deputy chief ministers ==
The list of deputy chief ministers in the Indian former state of United Andhra Pradesh include:

Keys: INC

#	Portrait	Deputy Chief Minister (Lifespan) Constituency	Term of the office		Election (Assembly)	Party	Chief Minister	Government
#	Portrait	Deputy Chief Minister (Lifespan) Constituency	Term start	Term end	Election (Assembly)	Party	Chief Minister	Government
1		Konda Venkata Ranga Reddy (1890–1970); MLA for Chevella	1959	11 January 1960	1955 (1st)	Indian National Congress	Neelam Sanjeeva Reddy	Neelam II
1		Konda Venkata Ranga Reddy (1890–1970); MLA for Chevella	11 January 1960	12 March 1962	1957 (2nd)	Indian National Congress	Damodaram Sanjivayya	Sanjivayya
2		J. V. Narsing Rao; MLA for Luxettipeta	1967	30 September 1971	1967 (4th)	Indian National Congress	Kasu Brahmananda Reddy	Kasu II
3		B. V. Subba Reddy (1903–1974); MLA for Koilakuntla	30 September 1971	11 November 1972	1972 (5th)	Indian National Congress	Pamulaparthi Venkata Narasimha Rao	Narasimha
President's rule imposed during the period (11 January 1973 – 10 December 1973)						Indian National Congress		
(3)		B. V. Subba Reddy (1903–1974); MLA for Koilakuntla	30 December 1973	7 June 1974	1972 (5th)	Indian National Congress	Jalagam Vengala Rao	Vengala
4		C. Jagannatha Rao (1924–2012); MLA for Narsapur	24 February 1982	20 September 1982	1978 (6th)	Indian National Congress	Bhavanam Venkatarami Reddy	Bhavanam
5		Koneru Ranga Rao (1936–2010); MLA for Tiruvuru	9 October 1992	12 December 1994	1989 (9th)	Indian National Congress	Kotla Vijaya Bhaskara Reddy	Kotla I
6		Damodar Raja Narasimha (born 1958); MLA for Andole	10 June 2011	1 February 2014	2009 (13th)	Indian National Congress	N. Kiran Kumar Reddy	Kiran
President's rule imposed during the period (1 March 2014 – 7 June 2014)

== List of Leaders of opposition in Assembly ==
In fact N. Chandrababu Naidu is the longest-serving leader of the opposition. He served as leader of opposition in United Andhra Pradesh Legislative Assembly for a period of 2004 – 2014 in Andhra which includes current day Andhra Pradesh and Telangana states N. Chandrababu Naidu is the last leader of opposition of United Andhra Pradesh before its bifurcation.

#	Portrait	Leader of the opposition (Lifespan) Constituency	Term of the office			Election (Assembly)	Party	Chief Minister	Appointed by (Speaker)
#	Portrait	Leader of the opposition (Lifespan) Constituency	Term start	Term end	Duration	Election (Assembly)	Party	Chief Minister	Appointed by (Speaker)
1		Puchalapalli Sundarayya (1913–1985); MLA for Gannavaram	1956	1957	1 year	1955 (1st)	Communist Party of India	Neelam Sanjiva Reddy	Ayyadevara Kaleswara Rao
1		Puchalapalli Sundarayya (1913–1985); MLA for Gannavaram	1957	1962	5 years	1957 (2nd)	Communist Party of India	Neelam Sanjiva Reddy Damodaram Sanjivayya	Ayyadevara Kaleswara Rao
2		Tarimela Nagi Reddy (1917–1976); MLA for Puttur	1962	1964	2 years	1962 (3rd)	Communist Party of India	Neelam Sanjiva Reddy	B. V. Subba Reddy
3		1.Arutla Kamala Devi MLA for Alair; 2.Pillalamarri Venkateswarlu MLA for Nandigama	1964	1967	3 years	1962 (3rd)	Communist Party of India	Kasu Brahmananda Reddy	B. V. Subba Reddy
4		Gouthu Latchanna (1917–1976); MLA for Sompeta	1967	1969	2 years	1967 (4th)	Swatantra Party	Kasu Brahmananda Reddy	B. V. Subba Reddy
5		Nukala Ramachandra Reddy (1919–1974); MLA for Dornakal	1969	1971	2 years	1967 (4th)		Kasu Brahmananda Reddy	B. V. Subba Reddy
6		Vacant	1972	1977	5 years	1972 (5th)	Communist Party of India	Pamulaparthi Venkata Narasimha Rao Jalagam Vengala Rao	Pidatala Ranga Reddy
7		Vacant	1977	1978	1 year	1972 (5th)		Jalagam Vengala Rao	Pidatala Ranga Reddy
(4)		Gouthu Latchanna (1909–2006); MLA for Sompeta	31 March 1978	1983	5 years	1978 (6th)	Janata Party	Marri Chenna Reddy T. Anjaiah Bhavanam Venkatarami Reddy Kotla Vijaya Bhaskara Reddy	Divi Kondaiah Chowdary
8		Ananthula Madan Mohan (1931–2004); MLA for Siddipet	19 January 1983	23 November 1984	1 year, 309 days	1983 (7th)	Indian National Congress	Nandamuri Taraka Rama Rao Nadendla Bhaskara Rao Nandamuri Taraka Rama Rao	Tangi Satyanarayana
9		Mogaligundla Baga Reddy (1930–2004); MLA for Zahirabad	14 March 1985	28 November 1989	4 years, 259 days	1985 (8th)	Indian National Congress	Nandamuri Taraka Rama Rao	G. Narayana Rao
10		Nandamuri Taraka Rama Rao (1923–1996); MLA for Hindupur	5 January 1990	10 December 1994	4 years, 339 days	1989 (9th)	Telugu Desam Party	Marri Chenna Reddy Nedurumalli Janardhana Reddy Kotla Vijaya Bhaskara Reddy	P. Ramachandra Reddy
11		Paripati Janardhan Reddy (1948–2007); MLA for Khairatabad	24 March 1995	9 October 1999	4 years, 199 days	1994 (10th)	Indian National Congress	Nandamuri Taraka Rama Rao Nara Chandrababu Naidu	Yanamala Rama Krishnudu
12		Yeduguri Sandinti Rajasekhara Reddy (1949–2009); MLA for Pulivendla	12 November 1999	14 November 2003	4 years, 2 days	1999 (11th)	Indian National Congress	Nara Chandrababu Naidu	K. Prathibha Bharathi
13		Nara Chandrababu Naidu (born 1950); MLA for Kuppam	2 June 2004	19 May 2009	4 years, 351 days	2004 (12th)	Telugu Desam Party	Yeduguri Sandinti Rajasekhara Reddy	K. R. Suresh Reddy
13		Nara Chandrababu Naidu (born 1950); MLA for Kuppam	19 May 2009	28 April 2014	4 years, 344 days	2009 (13th)	Telugu Desam Party	Yeduguri Sandinti Rajasekhara Reddy Konijeti Rosaiah Nallari Kiran Kumar Reddy	Kiran Kumar Reddy

== Creation of Telangana ==
After decades of protests and agitations, the central government, under the United Progressive Alliance, decided to bifurcate the existing Andhra Pradesh state and on 2 June 2014, the Union Cabinet unilaterally cleared the bill for the creation of Telangana. Lasting for almost 5 decades, it was one of the longest lasting movements for statehood in South India. On 18 February 2014, the Lok Sabha passed the bill with a voice vote. Subsequently, the bill was passed by the Rajya Sabha two days later, on 20 February. As per the bill, Hyderabad would be the capital of Telangana, while the city would also remain the capital of the residual state of Andhra Pradesh for no more than ten years. Hyderabad was the de jure joint capital. On 2 June 2014, Telangana was created with Hyderabad as its capital

The Telangana movement refers to a movement for the creation of a state, Telangana, from the pre-existing state of Andhra Pradesh in India. The new state corresponds to the Telugu-speaking portions of the erstwhile princely state of Hyderabad.

== See also ==
- Telugu states
