= List of deputy chief ministers of Andhra Pradesh =

Deputy Chief Minister of Andhra Pradesh
- Āndhra Pradēś Upa Mukhya Mantrī
- Emblem of Andhra Pradesh

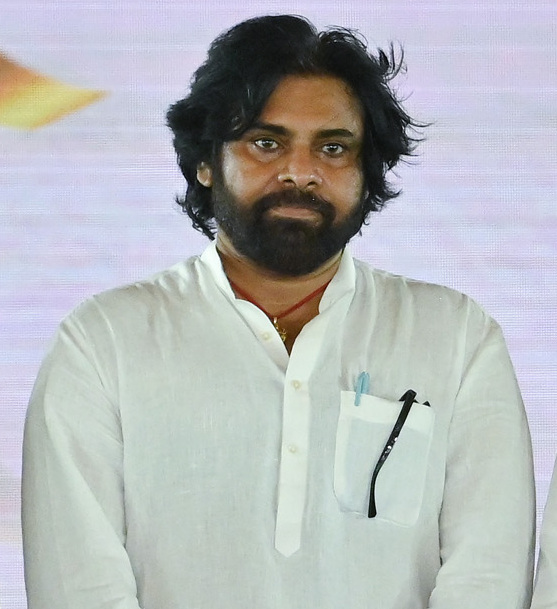
- Incumbent; Konidela Pawan Kalyan since 12 June 2024
- Deputy Chief Minister's Office (Government of Andhra Pradesh)
- Style: The Honourable (Formal); Mr./Mrs. Deputy Chief Minister (Informal)
- Status: Deputy head of government
- Abbreviation: DCM of AP
- Member of: Andhra Pradesh Legislature; Andhra Pradesh Council of Ministers
- Reports to: Governor of Andhra Pradesh; Chief Minister of Andhra Pradesh; Andhra Pradesh Legislature
- Seat: Andhra Pradesh Secretariat, Amaravati
- Appointer: The governor of Andhra Pradesh on the advice of the chief minister
- Term length: Five years and subject to no term limit; At the confidence of the Legislative Assembly
- Inaugural holder: Konda Venkata Ranga Reddy
- Formation: 1 October 1953; 73 years ago

The deputy chief minister of Andhra Pradesh is the deputy to the chief minister of Andhra Pradesh, who is the head of the government of Andhra Pradesh. The deputy chief minister is the second-highest-ranking member of the Andhra Pradesh Council of Ministers. A deputy chief minister also holds a cabinet portfolio in the state ministry. On multiple occasions, proposals have arisen to make the post permanent, but without result. The position of deputy chief minister is not explicitly defined or mentioned in the Constitution of India. However, the Supreme Court of India has stated that the appointment of deputy chief ministers is not unconstitutional. The court has clarified that a deputy chief minister, for all practical purposes, remains a minister in the council of ministers headed by the chief minister and does not draw a higher salary or perks compared to other ministers.During the absence of the chief minister, the deputy-chief minister may chair cabinet meetings and lead the assembly majority. Various deputy chief ministers have also taken the oath of secrecy in line with the one that chief minister takes. This oath has also sparked controversies.

In 1953, Andhra State consisted of Coastal Andhra and Rayalaseema regions. This state was carved out of the erstwhile Madras State. Later, the Andhra state was merged with Telangana province of Hyderabad to form Andhra Pradesh in November 1956. On 1 November 1958, Hyderabad State ceased to exist; its Gulbarga and Aurangabad divisions were merged into Mysore State and Bombay State respectively. Its remaining Telugu-speaking portion, Telangana, was added to Andhra State. Andhra state formed from Madras state on 1953 oct 1. After 58 years, Telangana was carved out to form as a separate state on 2 June 2014 by Andhra Pradesh Reorganisation Act, 2014.

Konda Venkata Ranga Reddy was first deputy chief minister since the state's formation in November 1956. Pushpasreevani Pamula was the first women to hold the post, who has served from June 2019 to April 2022.

The current incumbent Konidala Pawan Kalyan is from the Janasena Party since 16 June 2024.

== Oath as the state deputy chief minister ==
The deputy chief minister serves five years in the office. The following is the oath of the Deputy chief minister of state:

I, <Name of Deputy Chief Minister>, do swear in the name of God/solemnly affirm that I will bear true faith and allegiance to the Constitution of India as by law established, that I will uphold the sovereignty and integrity of India, that I will faithfully and conscientiously discharge my duties as a Minister for the State of () and that I will do right to all manner of people in accordance with the Constitution and the law without fear or favour, affection or ill-will.

Oath of Secrecy

"I, [Name], do swear in the name of God / solemnly affirm that I will not directly or indirectly communicate or reveal to any person or persons any matter which shall be brought under my consideration or shall become known to me as a Minister for the State of [Name of State] except as may be required for the due discharge of my duties as such Minister."Pad ki Shapath (Oath of Office) "Main, [DCM ka Naam], Ishwar ki shapath leta hoon / satyanishtha se pratigyan karta hoon ki main vidhi dwara sthapit Bharat ke Samvidhan ke prati sachi shraddha aur nishtha rakhunga. Main Bharat ki prabhuta aur akhandta akshunn rakhunga. Main [State ka Naam] ke Rajya ke Upa Mukhya Mantri ke roop mein apne kartavyon ka shraddhapoorvak aur shuddh antahkaran se nirvahan karunga, tatha main bhay ya pakshpat, anurag ya dwesh ke bina, sabhi prakar ke logon ke prati Samvidhan aur vidhi ke anusar nyay karunga." B. Gopniyata ki Shapath (Oath of Secrecy) "Main, [DCM ka Naam], Ishwar ki shapath leta hoon / satyanishtha se pratigyan karta hoon ki jo vishay [State ka Naam] ke Rajya ke Mukhya Mantri ke roop mein mere vichar ke liye laya jayega athva mujhe gyaat hoga, use kisi vyakti ya vyaktityon ko, tab ke sivay jab ki aise UpaMukhya Mantri ke roop mein apne kartavyon ke uchit nirvahan ke liye aisa karna apekshit ho, main pratyaksh (directly) ya apratyaksh (indirectly) roop mein sansuchit ya prakat nahi karunga."[Naa Peru] ane nenu, shasanam dvara nirmithamaina Bharatadesha Athmabhandhavya, Sarvabhoumadhikara mariyu Samagrathanu kapadathanu ani... (or: ...Bharata Rajyanganam patla nijanmaina vishwasam, vidheyatha kaligi untanu ani), [Andhra Pradesh / Telangana] Rashtra Mukhya Mantriga naa kartavyalanu shraddha thonu, anthahkarana shuddhi thonu nirvahisthanu ani... Bhayam gani, pakshapatam gani, raagadweshalu gani lekunda... Rajyanganam mariyu shasanalaku luyabadi, prajalandarki nyayam chesthanu ani... Devuni perita pramanam chesthunnanu / Atmasakshiga pramanam chesthunnanu.""[Naa Peru] ane nenu, [Andhra Pradesh / Telangana] Rashtra Mukhya Mantriga naa pariseelana loki vachina, leda naku thilina ey vishayannina... Oka Mukhya Mantriga naa kartavya nirvahanaku avasaramaina sangathullo thappa... prathyakshanga gani, parokshanga gani, ey vyakthiki leda vyakthulaku thelipe prasakthi ledu ani... Devuni perita pramanam chesthunnanu / Atmasakshiga pramanam chesthunnanu."

== List of deputy chief ministers ==
=== 1953–1956 ===
Andhra State consisted of North Andhra, Coastal Andhra and Rayalaseema regions. This state was carved out of Madras State in 1953. Neelam Sanjeeva Reddy served as deputy CM under Prakasam and Bezawada Gopala Reddy. Later, the Andhra state was merged with Telangana province of Hyderabad to form Andhra Pradesh in November 1956.

#	Portrait	Deputy Chief Minister (Lifespan) Constituency	Term of the office			Election (Assembly)	Party	Chief Minister	Government
#	Portrait	Deputy Chief Minister (Lifespan) Constituency	Term start	Term end	Days in office	Election (Assembly)	Party	Chief Minister	Government
1		Neelam Sanjiva Reddy (1913–1996)	1 October 1953	15 November 1954	1 year, 45 days	1952 (1st)	Indian National Congress	Tanguturi Prakasam	Prakasam
President's rule imposed during the period (15 November 1954–28 March 1955) (Note: President's rule may be imposed when the "government in a state is not able to function as per the Constitution", which often happens because no party or coalition has a majority in the assembly. When President's rule is in force in a state, its council of ministers stands dissolved. The office of chief minister thus lies vacant, and the administration is taken over by the governor, who functions on behalf of the central government. At times, the legislative assembly also stands dissolved.)
(1)		Neelam Sanjiva Reddy (1913–1996); MLA for Kalahasthi	30 March 1955	31 October 1956	1 year, 215 days	1955 (2nd)	Indian National Congress	Bezawada Gopala Reddy	Gopala

=== Since 1956 ===
#	Portrait	Deputy Chief Minister (Lifespan) Constituency	Term of the office		Election (Assembly)	Party	Chief Minister	Government
#	Portrait	Deputy Chief Minister (Lifespan) Constituency	Term start	Term end	Election (Assembly)	Party	Chief Minister	Government
1		Konda Venkata Ranga Reddy (1890–1970); MLA for Chevella	1959	11 January 1960	1955 (1st)	Indian National Congress	Neelam Sanjeeva Reddy	Neelam II
1		Konda Venkata Ranga Reddy (1890–1970); MLA for Chevella	11 January 1960	12 March 1962	1957 (2nd)	Indian National Congress	Damodaram Sanjivayya	Sanjivayya
2		J. V. Narsing Rao; MLA for Luxettipeta	1967	30 September 1971	1967 (4th)	Indian National Congress	Kasu Brahmananda Reddy	Kasu II
3		B. V. Subba Reddy (1903–1974); MLA for Koilakuntla	30 September 1971	11 November 1972	1972 (5th)	Indian National Congress	Pamulaparthi Venkata Narasimha Rao	Narasimha
President's rule imposed during the period (11 January 1973 – 10 December 1973)						Indian National Congress		
(3)		B. V. Subba Reddy (1903–1974); MLA for Koilakuntla	30 December 1973	7 June 1974	1972 (5th)	Indian National Congress	Jalagam Vengala Rao	Vengala
4		C. Jagannatha Rao (1924–2012); MLA for Narsapur	24 February 1982	20 September 1982	1978 (6th)	Indian National Congress	Bhavanam Venkatarami Reddy	Bhavanam
5		Koneru Ranga Rao (1936–2010); MLA for Tiruvuru	9 October 1992	12 December 1994	1989 (9th)	Indian National Congress	Kotla Vijaya Bhaskara Reddy	Kotla I
6		Damodar Raja Narasimha (born 1958); MLA for Andole	10 June 2011	1 February 2014	2009 (13th)	Indian National Congress	N. Kiran Kumar Reddy	Kiran
President's rule imposed during the period (1 March 2014 – 7 June 2014) (Note: After 58 years, the state was bifurcated into Andhra Pradesh and Telangana states on 2 June 2014 by Andhra Pradesh Reorganisation Act, 2014. After state reorganisation Andhra Pradesh Sasana sabha seats come down from 294 to 175 seats.)
7		Nimmakayala Chinarajappa (born 1953); MLA for Peddapuram	8 June 2014	23 May 2019	2014 (14th)	Telugu Desam Party	N. Chandrababu Naidu	Naidu III
7		K. E. Krishna Murthy (born 1938); MLA for Pattikonda	8 June 2014	23 May 2019	2014 (14th)	Telugu Desam Party	N. Chandrababu Naidu	Naidu III
8		Pilli Subhash Chandra Bose; MLC	8 June 2019	18 June 2020	2019 (15th)	YSR Congress Party	Y. S. Jagan Mohan Reddy	Jagan
8		Amzath Basha Shaik Bepari; MLA for Kadapa	8 June 2019	11 June 2024	2019 (15th)	YSR Congress Party	Y. S. Jagan Mohan Reddy	Jagan
8		K. Narayana Swamy; MLA for Gangadhara Nellore	8 June 2019	11 June 2024	2019 (15th)	YSR Congress Party	Y. S. Jagan Mohan Reddy	Jagan
8		Pamula Pushpa Sreevani (born 1986); MLA for Kurupam	8 June 2019	11 April 2022	2019 (15th)	YSR Congress Party	Y. S. Jagan Mohan Reddy	Jagan
8		Alla Nani (1969–2026); MLA for Eluru	8 June 2019	11 April 2022	2019 (15th)	YSR Congress Party	Y. S. Jagan Mohan Reddy	Jagan
9		Dharmana Krishna Das; MLA for Narasannapeta	22 July 2020	7 April 2022	2019 (15th)	YSR Congress Party	Y. S. Jagan Mohan Reddy	Jagan
10		Budi Mutyala Naidu; MLA for Madugula	11 April 2022	11 June 2024	2019 (15th)	YSR Congress Party	Y. S. Jagan Mohan Reddy	Jagan
10		Kottu Satyanarayana; MLA for Tadepalligudem	11 April 2022	11 June 2024	2019 (15th)	YSR Congress Party	Y. S. Jagan Mohan Reddy	Jagan
10		Peedika Rajanna Dora; MLA for Salur	11 April 2022	11 June 2024	2019 (15th)	YSR Congress Party	Y. S. Jagan Mohan Reddy	Jagan
11		Konidela Pawan Kalyan (born 1971); MLA for Pithapuram	12 June 2024	Incumbent	2024 (16th)	Janasena Party	N. Chandrababu Naidu	Naidu IV

== Statistics ==
#	Deputy Chief Minister	Party	Term of office	
#	Deputy Chief Minister	Party	Longest continuous term	Total duration of deputy chief ministership
1	Amzath Basha Shaik Bepari	YSRCP	5 years, 3 days	5 years, 3 days
2	K. Narayana Swamy	YSRCP	5 years, 3 days	5 years, 3 days
3	Nimmakayala Chinarajappa	TDP	4 years, 349 days	4 years, 349 days
4	K. E. Krishnamurthy	TDP	4 years, 349 days	4 years, 349 days
5	Pamula Pushpa Sreevani	YSRCP	2 years, 307 days	2 years, 307 days
6	Alla Nani	YSRCP	2 years, 307 days	2 years, 307 days
7	Damodar Raja Narasimha	INC	2 years, 236 days	2 years, 236 days
8	Konidala Pawan Kalyan	JSP	2 years, 134 days	2 years, 134 days
9	Koneru Ranga Rao	INC	2 years, 64 days	2 years, 64 days
10	Budi Mutyala Naidu	YSRCP	2 years, 61 days	2 years, 61 days
11	Kottu Satyanarayana	YSRCP	2 years, 61 days	2 years, 61 days
12	Peedika Rajanna Dora	YSRCP	2 years, 61 days	2 years, 61 days
13	Dharmana Krishna Das	YSRCP	1 year, 259 days	1 year, 259 days
14	B. V. Subba Reddy	INC	1 year, 103 days	1 year, 103 days
15	Pilli Subhash Chandra Bose	YSRCP	1 year, 10 days	1 year, 10 days
16	C. Jagannatha Rao	INC	208 days	208 days
