= K. Narayana Swamy =

Indian politician

8th Deputy Chief Minister of Andhra Pradesh
- In office 8 June 2019 – 11 June 2024 Serving with Amzath Basha Shaik Bepari; Alla Nani; Pilli Subhash Chandra Bose; Pamula Pushpa Sreevani; Dharmana Krishna Das
- Ministry & Portfolios: Minister of Excise and Commercial taxes Government of Andhra Pradesh
- Preceded by: Nimmakayala Chinarajappa & K. E. Krishnamurthy (as Deputy cm); Kollu Ravindra (Excise); Yanamala Ramakrishnudu (Commercial Taxes)
- Succeeded by: Pawan Kalyan (as Deputy cm); Kollu Ravindra (Excise); Payyavula Kesav (Commercial Taxes)

Member of Andhra Pradesh Legislative Assembly
- In office 2014–2024
- Preceded by: Kuthuhalam Gummadi
- Succeeded by: V M Thomas
- Constituency: Gangadhara Nellore (SC)
- In office 2004–2009
- Preceded by: Naramalli Sivaprasad
- Succeeded by: H Hemalatha
- Constituency: Satyavedu (SC)

Personal details
- Born: Kalathuru Narayana Swamy
- Party: YSR Congress Party
- Other political affiliations: Indian National Congress
- Occupation: Politician, Agriculturist

Kalattur Narayana Swamy is an Indian politician who was a member of the 15th Andhra Pradesh Assembly. He represented the Gangadhara Nellore (SC) Assembly Constituency. He belongs to the YSR Congress Party.

In 2019, he became one of the five Deputy Chief Ministers of Andhra Pradesh in the Y. S. Jaganmohan Reddy led cabinet and was also given a charge of Minister of Excise and Commercial taxes.
