= AP Model School =

School in Andhra Pradesh, India

Andhra Pradesh Model Schools or AP Model School's (2013) is an English-medium Government Model school in Andhra Pradesh. The Government of Andhra Pradesh, which owns and runs schools in educationally backward districts, originally intended to start around 355 schools in the first phase and 400 in the second phase. Due to state bifurcation (2014), 192 were allotted to Telangana State and 163 Model Schools were allotted to residual Andhra Pradesh. For implementation of the above scheme, Government Sanctioned (7100) newly created posts by Direct Recruitment and (5074) newly created post on outsourcing basis at State, District and School Level.

== History ==
The first model school in the state was opened at Tegada in Kasimkota mandal in Visakhapatnam by the Chief Minister of Andhra Pradesh Sri N.Kiran kumar Reddy in 2013.

The Model School Scheme is no longer funded by the Government of India, and responsibility for the programme has been transferred to the states. On 15 March 2024 regular teaching staff of Model Schools (APMS) were merged in Commissionerate of School Education and payment of salaries moved to "010-Salaries" Head of Account Orders Issued by Government of Andhra Pradesh.
