= Reddeppagari Madhavi Reddy =

Indian politician

Member of Legislative Assembly Andhra Pradesh
- Incumbent
- Assumed office 2024
- Preceded by: Amzath Basha Shaik Bepari
- Constituency: Kadapa

Personal details
- Party: Telugu Desam Party

Reddeppagari Madhavi Reddy (born 1974) is an Indian politician from Andhra Pradesh. She is a first-time MLA from Kadapa Assembly constituency and first female MLA to represent Kadapa in the Andhra Pradesh Legislative Assembly. She represents Telugu Desam Party. She won the 2024 Andhra Pradesh Legislative Assembly election.

== Early life and education ==
Madhavi is from an agricultural family in Kadapa. She married Srinivasa Reddy Reddeppagari (TDP Politburo Member). She did her graduation in Arts from a college affiliated with Osmania University, Hyderabad, in 1995.

== Career ==
Madhavi won the 2024 Andhra Pradesh Legislative Assembly election from Kadapa Assembly Constituency representing Telugu Desam Party. She defeated Amzath Basha Shaik Bepari of YSR Congress Party by a margin of 18860 votes and was appointed whip on 12 November 2024.
