= Amzath Basha Shaik Bepari =

Indian politician

8th Deputy Chief Minister of Andhra Pradesh
- In office 8 June 2019 – 11 June 2024 Serving with Alla Nani; K. Narayana Swamy; Pilli Subhash Chandra Bose; Pamula Pushpa Sreevani; Dharmana Krishna Das
- Governor: E. S. L. Narasimhan; Biswabhusan Harichandan
- Chief Minister: Y. S. Jagan Mohan Reddy
- Preceded by: Nimmakayala Chinarajappa; K. E. Krishnamurthy
- Succeeded by: Konidela Pawan Kalyan
Additional ministries
Incumbent
Assumed office 8 June 2019
| Ministry and Departments | Minority welfare |
| Preceded by | N. M. D. Farooq |

Member of the Andhra Pradesh Legislative Assembly
- In office 7 May 2014 – June 2024
- Preceded by: Ahmadulla Mohammad Syed
- Succeeded by: Reddeppagari Madhavi Reddy
- Constituency: Kadapa

Personal details
- Party: YSR Congress Party
- Occupation: Politician

Amzath Basha Shaik Bepari is an Indian politician who is 8th Deputy Chief Minister of Andhra Pradesh and MLA from Kadapa.

He belongs to the YSR Congress Party. He started his political career as a Corporator from Kadapa Municipal Corporation in 2009 under YSR rule and was later elected as MLA with more than 30,000 majority in 2014 Elections. He continued his loyalty with Y. S. Jaganmohan Reddy and now has won with more than 50,000 majority from Kadapa constituency, the fourth highest majority in the State Assembly elections. He is from the business family namely called as "Haroon sab" family. He completed his school education in Nirmala English Medium School and Intermediate from St. Joseph Jr. college, Kadapa.

In 2019, he became one of the five Deputy Chief Ministers of Andhra Pradesh in the Y. S. Jaganmohan Reddy led cabinet and was also given a charge of Minister of Minority welfare.

== MLA terms ==
| SI No. | Year | Constituency | Margin | Party |
|---|---|---|---|---|
| 1. | 2014 | Kadapa | 30,000 | YSRCP |
| 2. | 2019 | Kadapa | 50,000 | YSRCP |
