= Gummadi Kuthuhalamma =

Indian politician (1949–2023)

Member of the Andhra Pradesh Legislative Assembly
- In office 1985–2014
- Succeeded by: V. M. Thomas
- Constituency: Vepanjeri (1985–2009) Gangadhara Nellore (2009–2014)

Personal details
- Born: 1 June 1949 Kandukur, Prakasam district, Madras Province, India
- Died: 15 February 2023 (aged 73) Tirupati, Andhra Pradesh, India
- Party: INC (until 2014); TDP (since 2014)

Gummadi Kuthuhalamma (1 June 1949 – 15 February 2023) is an Indian politician from Andhra Pradesh. She was a member of the Indian National Congress and later the Telugu Desam Party. She served in the Andhra Pradesh Legislative Assembly from 1985 to 2014 for five terms.

== Early life and education ==
Kuthuhalamma was born in Kandukur, Prakasam district. She completed her MBBS and was a practicing doctor.

== Career ==
Kuthuhalamma had hogged the limelight in 1978 as a rebel candidate of the Congress Party, and became the Zilla Parishad chairman of the erstwhile united Chittoor district. In 1979, she was back as a Youth Congress leader. She was the Chittoor Zilla Parishad chairperson from 1980 to 1985.

She was first elected as an MLA from the erstwhile Vepanjeri Assembly Constituency (SC) in the 1985 Andhra Pradesh Legislative Assembly election. Later, she successfully contested for three more terms between 1989 and 1999. In 2004, she had won from Vepanjeri for the fifth time on Congress ticket. In the 2004 Andhra Pradesh Legislative Assembly election she defeated O. Chandramma of Telugu Desam Party by a margin of 11,582 votes. Her final stint as an MLA was from the new Gangadhara Nellore Assembly constituency after her victory in the 2009 Andhra Pradesh Legislative Assembly election. Later in 2014, she joined TDP but lost the election.

From 1991 to 1993, she had worked as Minister for Health in the N. Janardhan Reddy government. From 2007 to 2009, during the Y.S. Rajasekhara Reddy government, she had worked as Deputy Speaker of the Legislative Assembly.

In 2014, she had joined the Telugu Desam Party and was defeated from the Gangadhara Nellore Assembly constituency.

Kuthuhalamma died in Tirupati on 15 February 2023, at the age of 73.
