= Mee Seva (Andhra Pradesh) =

Public service in India

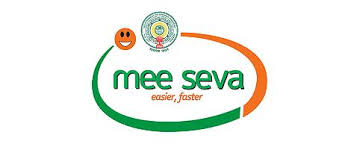

Agency overview
- Formed: 2011
- Preceding agency: e-Seva (1999)
- Website: https://ap.meeseva.gov.in/

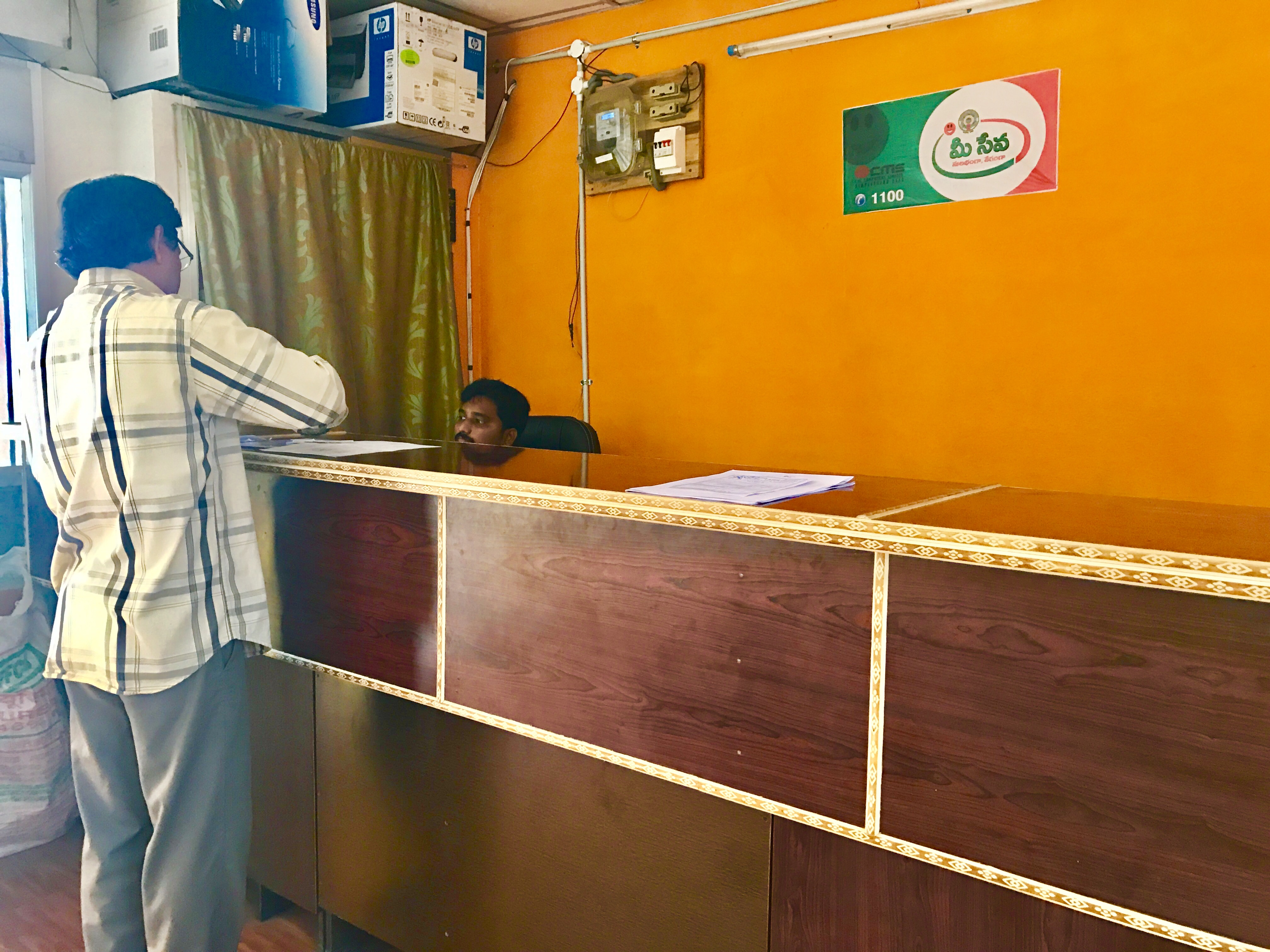
Mee seva office in Velagapudi, Amaravathi

MeeSeva (translates as 'At your service') is a good governance initiative that incorporates the vision of National eGov Plan "Public Services Closer to Home" and facilitates single entry portal for entire range of G2C (Government to Citizens) and G2B (Government to Business) services.

== History ==
MeeSeva was launched in 2011 in Chittoor District. Previously it is e-Seva, started in 1999 in Hyderabad with 1 service center to the citizens. e-Seva is perhaps the best example and one of the earliest attempts to take the benefits of e-governance to citizens. Pioneered by the then IT secretary in Andhra Pradesh, J.SATYA NARAYANA, currently CEO of the National Institute of Smart Governance, and driven by the then chief minister, Chandrababu Naidu, e-Seva started as the TWINS project to provide multiple citizen-facing services of the government under one umbrella. Instead of citizens having to go from one department to another, multiple government services are provided under a single window. Starting with a single centre offering six services with 1,000 transactions a month in 2001, e-Seva has grown to nearly 200 centres offering 160 services, clocking 30 million transactions/month with a value of ₹500 crore a month.

== Services ==
Today, MeeSeva offers citizens a bouquet of 329 high volume services from across 36 departments through 7000+ MeeSeva kiosk centers across the states of Andhra Pradesh and Telangana.

After the AP State re-organisation Act 2014, MeeSeva contains two different portals for the states of Andhra Pradesh and Telangana.
