= Bharat Rashtra Samithi =

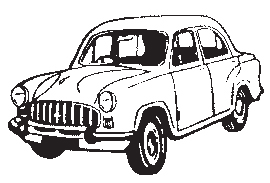
- Abbreviation: BRS
- President: K. Chandrashekar Rao
- Chairperson: K. T. Rama Rao
- General Secretary: Joginapally Santosh Kumar
- Rajya Sabha Leader: Vaddiraju Ravi Chandra
- Founder: K. Chandrashekar Rao
- Founded: 27 April 2001 (25 years ago) (as Telangana Rashtra Samithi)
- Split from: Telugu Desam Party
- Headquarters: Telangana Bhavan, Bhavani Nagar, Banjara Hills, Hyderabad, Telangana - 500034
- Newspaper: Namasthe Telangana, Telangana Today
- Student wing: Bharat Rashtra Samithi Vidyarthi (BRSV)
- Women's wing: Bharat Rashtra Samithi Mahila (BRSM)
- Ideology: Populism; Federalism; Neoliberalism; Regionalism (until 2022)
- Political position: Centre to centre-right
- Colours: Pink
- ECI status: State Party
- Alliance: UPA (2004–2006); Third Front + Maha Kutami (2009); BRS + LF (2022–2023)
- Seats in Rajya Sabha: 3 / 245
- Seats in Lok Sabha: 0 / 543
- Seats in Telangana Legislative Council: 18 / 40
- Seats in Telangana Legislative Assembly: 27 / 119
- Number of states and union territories in government: 0 / 31

Party flag

Website
- https://brsonline.in/

Bharat Rashtra Samithi (transl. Indian National Council; abbr. BRS), formerly known as Telangana Rashtra Samithi (transl. Telangana National Council; abbr. TRS), is an Indian political party predominantly active in the state of Telangana and currently the primary opposition party in the state. Founded on 27 April 2001 by K. Chandrashekar Rao, it has a single-point agenda of creating a separate Telangana state from Andhra Pradesh, with Hyderabad as its capital. It has been instrumental in carrying forth a sustained agitation for the granting of statehood to Telangana which was realized in 2014.

The party won the majority of seats in the 2014 Telangana Assembly Election, forming the first government of the State with K. Chandrashekar Rao as its chief minister. The party won 11 seats in the 2014 general election, making it the eighth largest party in Lok Sabha, the lower house (lok sabha) of the Indian Parliament.

After a landslide victory in the 2018 Telangana Legislative Assembly election, the party formed the government in the State for the second time. In the 2019 Indian general election, the party's tally had fallen to nine seats in the Lok Sabha.

Later on 5 October 2022, the name of the party was changed from Telangana Rashtra Samithi to Bharat Rashtra Samithi to foray into national politics. After suffering a decisive defeat in the 2023 Telangana Legislative Assembly election, the party was restricted to winning only 39 seats in the state of Telangana, while failing to win any seats in the 2024 Indian general election. As of 2025, the party holds four seats in the upper house, Rajya Sabha.

== Ideology ==
Flag of Telangana Rashtra Samithi

On 27 April 2001, Rao resigned as Deputy Speaker of the Andhra Pradesh Legislative Assembly as member of Telugu Desam Party. He opined that Telangana people were being categorically discriminated against within the undivided State of Andhra Pradesh. Consequently, Rao argued that only the creation of a separate State of Telangana would allow for the alleviation of the people's predicament. Accordingly, KCR founded the Telangana Rashtra Samithi (TRS) Party at Jala Drushyam, Hyderabad, in April 2001, to achieve statehood for Telangana. The party initially won one-third of Mandal Parishad Territorial Constituencies (MPTC) and one-quarter of Zilla Parishad Territorial Constituencies (ZPTC) in Siddipet within 60 days of the formation of the party.

== Politics ==
Logo in use under the party's original name

=== 2004 elections ===
In the aftermath of 2004 Andhra Pradesh Legislative Assembly election, the party won 26 state assembly seats and five parliamentary seats. The TRS formed an alliance with the Indian National Congress and joined the United Progressive Alliance. In September 2006, the party withdrew support for the central government on the grounds of indecision over the delivery of its electoral promise to create Telangana. On 13 September 2006, Rao triggered a by-election in his Lok Sabha constituency of Karimnagar, claiming provocation from Congress MLA M. Satyanarayana Rao and citing delay in the formation of Telangana state, as promised by Congress in its 2004 manifesto. He won the subsequent by-election with a strong majority. All TRS MLAs and MPs resigned their positions in April 2008 when the Central government did not meet their demand for a separate state in its latest budget session. The by-election was held on 29 May 2008. In the 2008 by-elections, TRS retained only seven out of the 16 assembly segments and two out of the four Lok Sabha segments that it resigned, a significant defeat for the party. TRS president K. Chandrasekhar Rao offered to resign after the by-election losses, but instead remained in office after other party leaders rejected the resignation.

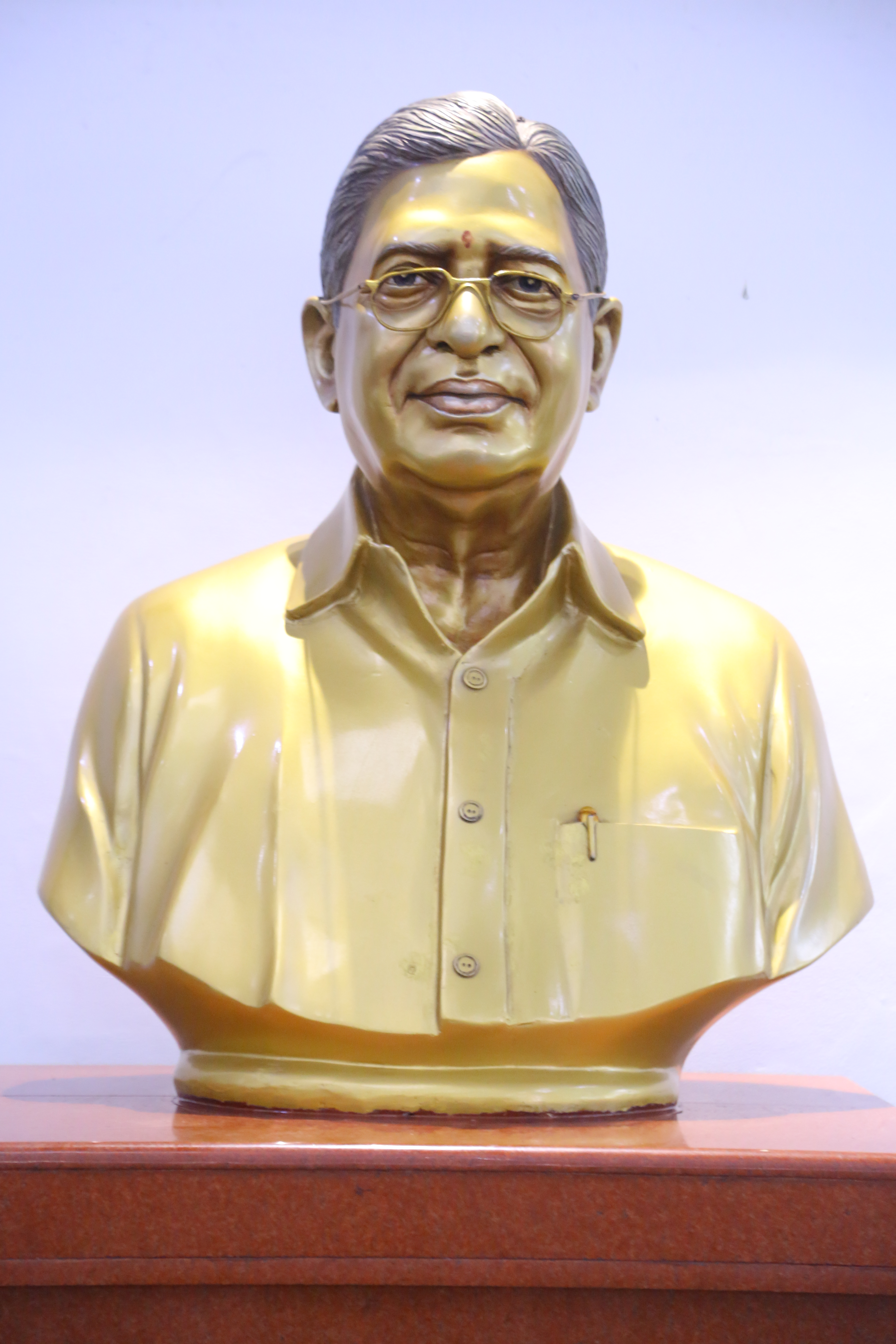
Prof Jayashankar Statue in Telangana Bhavan, TRS State Office

=== 2009 elections ===
In the 2009 Andhra Pradesh Legislative Assembly election, the party contested as part of the Maha Kutami (Grand Alliance) alongside the Telugu Desam Party and the Left parties, to challenge the incumbent Congress government. TRS contested 45 assembly seats but secured only 10, marking a sharp decline from its 2004 tally of 26 seats. The party’s performance was widely regarded as disappointing, with several candidates even losing their deposits, indicating limited electoral traction despite the growing sentiment for a separate Telangana state. TRS extended support to the National Democratic Alliance after polling but before counting.

=== 2014 elections ===
In the 2014 Assembly and National Elections, TRS did not align with NDA or UPA and fought the elections on its own. TRS, which led the campaign for a separate State for more than a decade, emerged victorious by winning 11 of the 17 Lok Sabha seats and 63 of the 119 Assembly seats, and emerged as the party with the largest vote share in Telangana. The TRS' campaign had no other stars except KCR who addressed over 300 public meetings, heli-hopping around and often addressing more than 10 meetings in a single day. The TRS not only retained its north Telangana stronghold but also made inroads in south Telangana, a Congress bastion.

It was only after the bifurcation of Andhra Pradesh, and the creation of separate Telangana state that the party begun to deliver electoral success. TRS won 63 out of 110 seats it contested in the 2014 Assembly elections in the newly formed state, and went on to form the government. K. Chandrashekar Rao, had taken oath as the first Chief Minister of the new state of Telangana on 2 June 2014.

=== 2018 Telangana Legislative Assembly election ===
The TRS Government headed by Chief Minister K. Chandrasekhar Rao on 6 September 2018 dissolved the Legislative Assembly, the first after the formation of Telangana, to pave the way for early elections in the state. The party announced a list of 104 candidates for elections on the same day.

In the 2018 Telangana Legislative Assembly election, held three months after the house dissolution, the TRS party won with a massive majority. They won 88 seats, more than 70% of the 119 total.

=== 2019 Indian general election ===
In May 2019, TRS Chief Rao flouted the idea of Federal Front, aiming for a non-Congress and non-BJP government at the centre. The party won nine out of the contested 17 seats, a reduction of two seats from the 2014 election.

=== 2022-present: Name change, electoral setbacks ===
==== Bharat Rashtra Samithi ====
The name of the party was changed from Telangana Rashtra Samithi to Bharat Rashtra Samithi on 5 October 2022 to foray into national politics ahead of the 2024 Indian general election. On 6 October 2022, officials from BRS submitted the relevant documents required for name change according to the Representation of the People Act, 1951 to the Election Commission of India in New Delhi. As of October 2022, the party activities are taking place from a rented building at Sardar Patel Marg in Delhi. On 14 November the party office was inaugurated at New Delhi.

==== Andhra Pradesh unit ====
The party created its local unit in the residual Andhra Pradesh state on 2 January 2023. Dr. Thota Chandrasekhar, former general secretary of the Jana Sena Party, was named its president. Other leaders from Andhra Pradesh who joined the party on the on its state unit's formation include former minister Ravela Kishore Babu, former IRS official Partha Sarathi, and former Praja Rajyam Party leader T. J. Prakash.

The state unit suffered a setback in April 2023 when the Election Commission of India derecognised the BRS as a state party in Andhra Pradesh. The party had been enjoying state party status in Undivided Andhra Pradesh since 2004, and then in the states of residual Andhra Pradesh and Telangana since 2014.

==== 2023 Telangana Legislative Assembly election ====
At the 2023 Telangana Legislative Assembly election, the party lost their majority, with their vote share falling by 10.52% to 37.35% and their seat count falling from 88 to 39. They retained their seats in the Greater Hyderabad region, but lost most of their seats in the rest of the state to Congress, who won 64 seats and formed the next government.

==== 2024 Indian general election ====
The party suffered a further setback at the 2024 Indian General Election. Despite their previous national ambitions, the party only contested in Telangana. However, they were wiped out, losing all 9 of their seats in the state. The party's vote share was over cut in half from 41.71% to 16.68%.

== Legislative leaders ==
=== List of chief ministers ===
Chief Minister of Telangana

No.	Portrait	Name (Birth–Death)	Term in office			Assembly	Constituency	Ministry
No.	Portrait	Name (Birth–Death)	Assumed office	Left office	Time in office	Assembly	Constituency	Ministry
1		K. Chandrashekar Rao (b. 1954)	2 June 2014	12 December 2018	9 years, 188 days	1st	Gajwel	Rao I
1		K. Chandrashekar Rao (b. 1954)	13 December 2018	6 December 2023	9 years, 188 days	2nd	Gajwel	Rao II

=== Deputy Chief Ministers of Telangana ===
S.No.	Name	Portrait	Took office	Left office	Term	Chief Minister
1	M. Mahmood Ali		2 June 2014	12 December 2018	4 years, 193 days	K. Chandrashekar Rao
2	T. Rajaiah		2 June 2014	25 January 2015	237 days	K. Chandrashekar Rao
3	Kadiyam Srihari		25 January 2015	12 December 2018	3 years, 321 days	K. Chandrashekar Rao

== List of Union Ministers ==
No.	Image	Minister	Portfolio	Term in Office			Constituency (House)	Prime Minister
No.	Image	Minister	Portfolio	Assumed Office	Left Office	Time in Office	Constituency (House)	Prime Minister
1		K. Chandrashekhar Rao (1954–)	Minister of Shipping	23 May 2004	25 May 2004	2 days	Karimnagar (Lok Sabha)	Manmohan Singh (Manmohan I)
1		K. Chandrashekhar Rao (1954–)	Minister without Portfolio	25 May 2004	27 November 2004	186 days	Karimnagar (Lok Sabha)	Manmohan Singh (Manmohan I)
1		K. Chandrashekhar Rao (1954–)	Minister of Labour and Employment	27 November 2004	24 August 2006	1 year, 270 days	Karimnagar (Lok Sabha)	Manmohan Singh (Manmohan I)
2		Ale Narendra (1946–2014)	Minister of Rural Development (Minister of State)	23 May 2004	24 August 2006	2 years, 93 days	Medak (Lok Sabha)	Manmohan Singh (Manmohan I)

== Leadership ==
List of presidents
S.No.	Portrait	Name	Term (tenure length)	Duration	Ref.				
S.No.	Portrait	Name	Term (tenure length)	Duration	Ref.	1	K. Chandrashekar Rao	27 April 2001 – Incumbent	25 years, 6 months and 25 days

List of working presidents
S.No.	Portrait	Name	Term (tenure length)	Duration	Ref.				
S.No.	Portrait	Name	Term (tenure length)	Duration	Ref.	1	K. T. Rama Rao	15 December 2018 – Incumbent	7 years, 11 months and 6 days

== Electoral performance ==
=== Lok Sabha Election ===
Election Year	House term	Party leader	Seats contested	Seats won	Change in seats	Popular vote	Percentage of votes	Vote swing	Outcome	Ref.
2004	14th	K. Chandrashekar Rao	12	5 / 543	▲5	2,441,405	0.63%	new	Government	
2009	15th	K. Chandrashekar Rao	9	2 / 543	▼3	2,582,326	0.62%	▼0.01%	Others	
2014	16th	K. Chandrashekar Rao	17	11 / 543	▲9	6,736,270	1.22%	▲0.6%	Others	
2019	17th	K. Chandrashekar Rao	17	9 / 543	▼2	7,696,848	1.25%	▲0.03%	Others	
2024	18th	K. Chandrashekar Rao	17	0 / 543	▼11	3,657,237	0.57%	▼0.68%	Lost	

Vote share in consecutive Lok Sabha elections
2004	0.63%
2009	0.61%
2014	1.22%
2019	1.25%
2024	1.22%

All time-BRS Lok Sabha seat count

=== State Legislative Assembly elections ===
Election Year	House term	Party leader	Seats contested	Seats won	Change in seats	Popular vote	Percentage of votes	Vote swing	Outcome	Ref.
United Andhra Pradesh Legislative Assembly
2004	12th	K. Chandrashekar Rao	54	26 / 294	▲26	2,390,940	6.68%	new	Government	
2009	13th	K. Chandrashekar Rao	45	10 / 294	▼16	1,678,906	3.99%	▼2.69%	Others	
2014	1st	K. Chandrashekar Rao	119	63 / 119	▲53	6,620,326	13.68%		Government (Note: Outcome-Government is restricted to Telangana)	
Telangana Legislative Assembly
2018	2nd	K. Chandrashekar Rao	119	88 / 119	▲25	9,700,479	46.9%		Government	
2023	3rd	K. Chandrashekar Rao	119	39 / 119	▼49	8,753,924	37.35%	▼9.55%	Opposition	

== See also ==
- Jaya Jaya He Telangana
- All India Majlis-e-Ittehadul Muslimeen
- Telangana Jagarana Sena
- List of political parties in India
