= V. M. Thomas =

Indian politician from Andhra Pradesh

Dr. V. M. Thomas
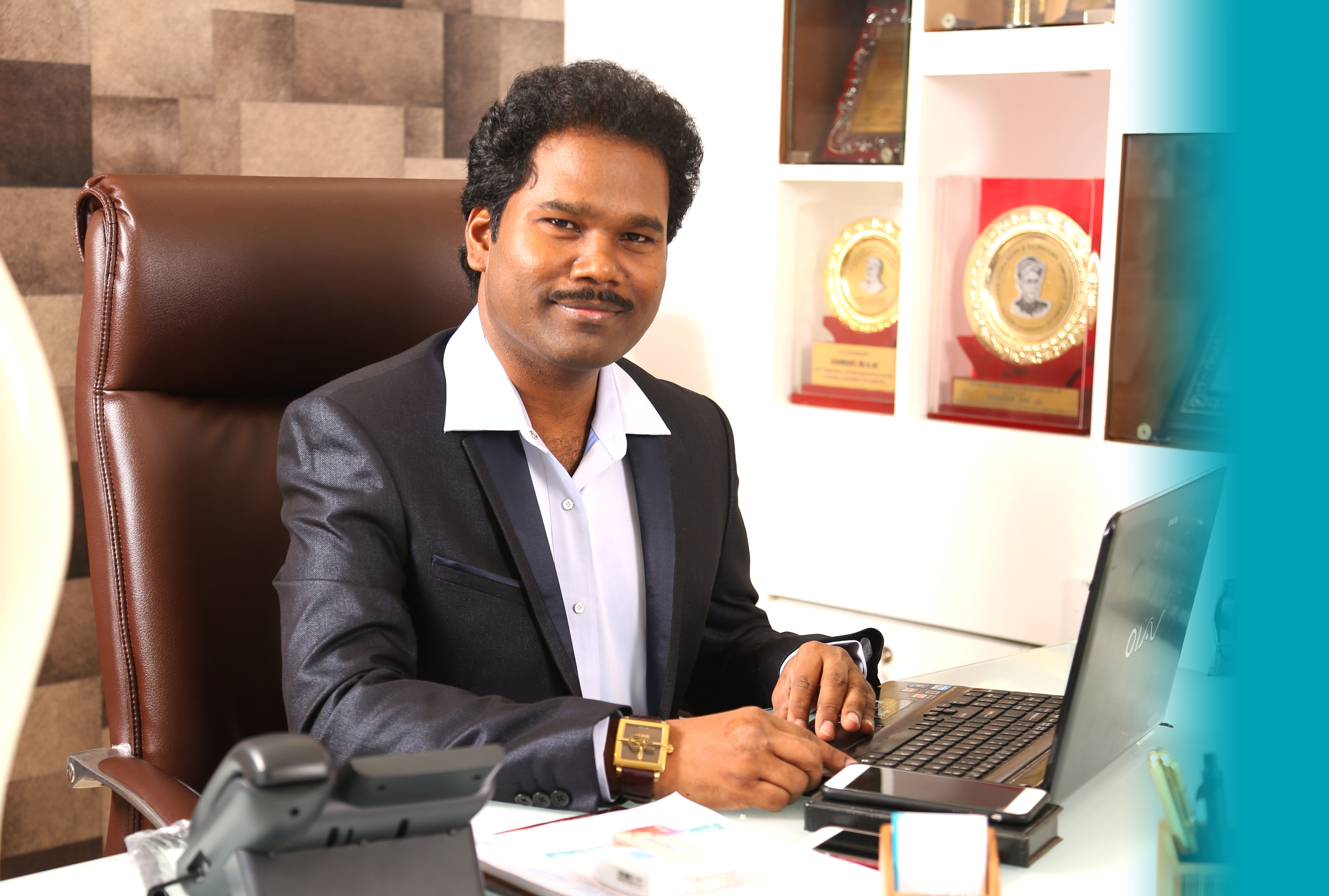

Member of the Andhra Pradesh Legislative Assembly
- Incumbent
- Assumed office 4 June 2024
- Preceded by: K. Narayana Swamy
- Constituency: Gangadhara Nellore

Personal details
- Born: 28 June 1974 (age 52)
- Party: Telugu Desam Party
- Spouse: Anarkali Reddy
- Children: VM Rahul, VM Roshan
- Parents: V Prakasam (father); V Rani (mother)
- Education: Karnatak University
- Profession: Embryology Scientist

Vadingadu Munaswamy Thomas (born 28 June 1974) is an Embryology Scientist & Indian politician from Andhra Pradesh. He is an MLA from Gangadhara Nellore Assembly constituency which is in Chittoor district. He represents Telugu Desam Party. He won the 2024 Andhra Pradesh Legislative Assembly election and was appointed Whip on 12 November 2024.

== Early life and education ==
Thomas was born into a middle class family to Vadingadu Prakasam and Vadingadu Rani. He is an embryologist. He did his M.Sc. and completed his doctorate in Zoology in 2000 at Karnatak University, Dharwad. He is a specialist in fertility and runs the Chennai Fertility Centre. Earlier, he did his B.Sc. at Government Degree College, Puttur, Andhra Pradesh. He did his schooling at CSI school, Kollagunta.

== Political career ==
Thomas joined Telugu Desam party in June 2023. He won the 2024 Andhra Pradesh Legislative Assembly election from Gangadhara Nellore Assembly constituency representing Telugu Desam Party. He polled 101,176 votes and defeated Krupalakshmi, daughter of deputy chief minister K. Narayana Swamy, by a margin of 26,011 votes.

He became Whip to Andhra Pradesh government, currently serving as MLA & Whip to Andhra Pradesh Government.
