= B. V. Subba Reddy =

Indian independence activist and politician

B V Subba Reddy

Speaker of the Andhra Pradesh Legislative Assembly
- In office 1962–1970

Deputy chief minister of Andhra Pradesh
- In office 30 Sep 1971-11 Nov 1972

Personal details
- Born: 4 July 1903 Koilkuntla, Kurnool district
- Died: 7 June 1974 (aged 70) Hyderabad
- Party: Indian National Congress
- Spouse: Subbamma
- Children: Six sons & 1 daughter

Bollavarapu Venkata Subba Reddy, shortly B. V. Subba Reddy B.L. (4 July 1903 - 7 June 1974), was an Indian independence activist, politician and Speaker of Andhra Pradesh Legislative Assembly.

== Early life ==
He was son of Ramaswamy Reddy and born at Koilkuntla, Kurnool district on 4 July 1903. After graduating from Noble College, Machilipatnam in 1926, he studied for a Bachelor of Law from Madras University. He started practising in Nandyala and earned a good name.

== Career ==
He was elected unanimously as the Chairman of Kurnool district Board as a Congress candidate in 1938. He was elected to the post once again in 1949.

He participated in the Individual Satyagraha in 1941 and was jailed for 6 months. He also participated in the Quit India movement of 1942 and was arrested and jailed in Tanjore for 3 years. B. V. Subba Reddy resigned to Congress party in 1955 and was elected independently to the Andhra Pradesh Legislative Assembly. He again joined Congress and was elected from the Koilkuntla constituency in 1962 and 1967. He was elected as Speaker of the Andhra pradesh Assembly after the death of the first Speaker Ayyadevara Kaleswara Rao in 1962. He was elected to the Chair once again in 1967. He served the Assembly as a Speaker for 10 years with respect and dignity.

He has visited Soviet Russia, London, and attended the Commonwealth Parliamentary Conference in 1965 and 1968.

He was chosen as Deputy Chief Minister under P. V. Narasimha Rao in September 1971.

=== Jai Andhra movement ===
He resigned his post(Deputy Chief Minister) to participate in the Jai Andhra movement in November 1972 and actively led.

He then joined the ministry of Jalagam Vengala Rao as Deputy Chief Minister in December 1973. He died in this position on 7 June 1974 in Hyderabad.

His bronze statue was erected in the B. V. Subba Reddy Memorial Park at Koilkuntla in Kurnool district in 2010.
