= J. V. Narsing Rao =

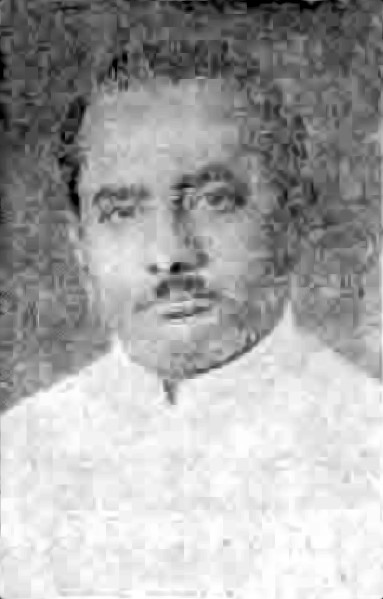

2nd Deputy Chief Minister of Andhra Pradesh
- In office 1967 – 30 Sept 1971
- Preceded by: K. V. Ranga Reddy
- Succeeded by: C. Jagannatha Rao
- Constituency: Luxettipeta

Joginapally Venkat Narsing Rao was an Indian politician belonging to Indian National Congress. He was one of the signatories from the Telangana region in Gentlemen's agreement of Andhra Pradesh (1956). He was the Deputy Chief Minister in Andhra Pradesh in 1972.

== Life ==
He won as an MLA from Luxettipet in two successive elections in 1967 and 1972 and was also made a Deputy Chief Minister in his second stint.

He was married.
