= Kadapa Assembly constituency =

Constituency of the Andhra Pradesh Legislative Assembly, India

Coordinates: 14.47°N 78.82°E

Kadapa
- Constituency No. 126 for the Andhra Pradesh Legislative Assembly
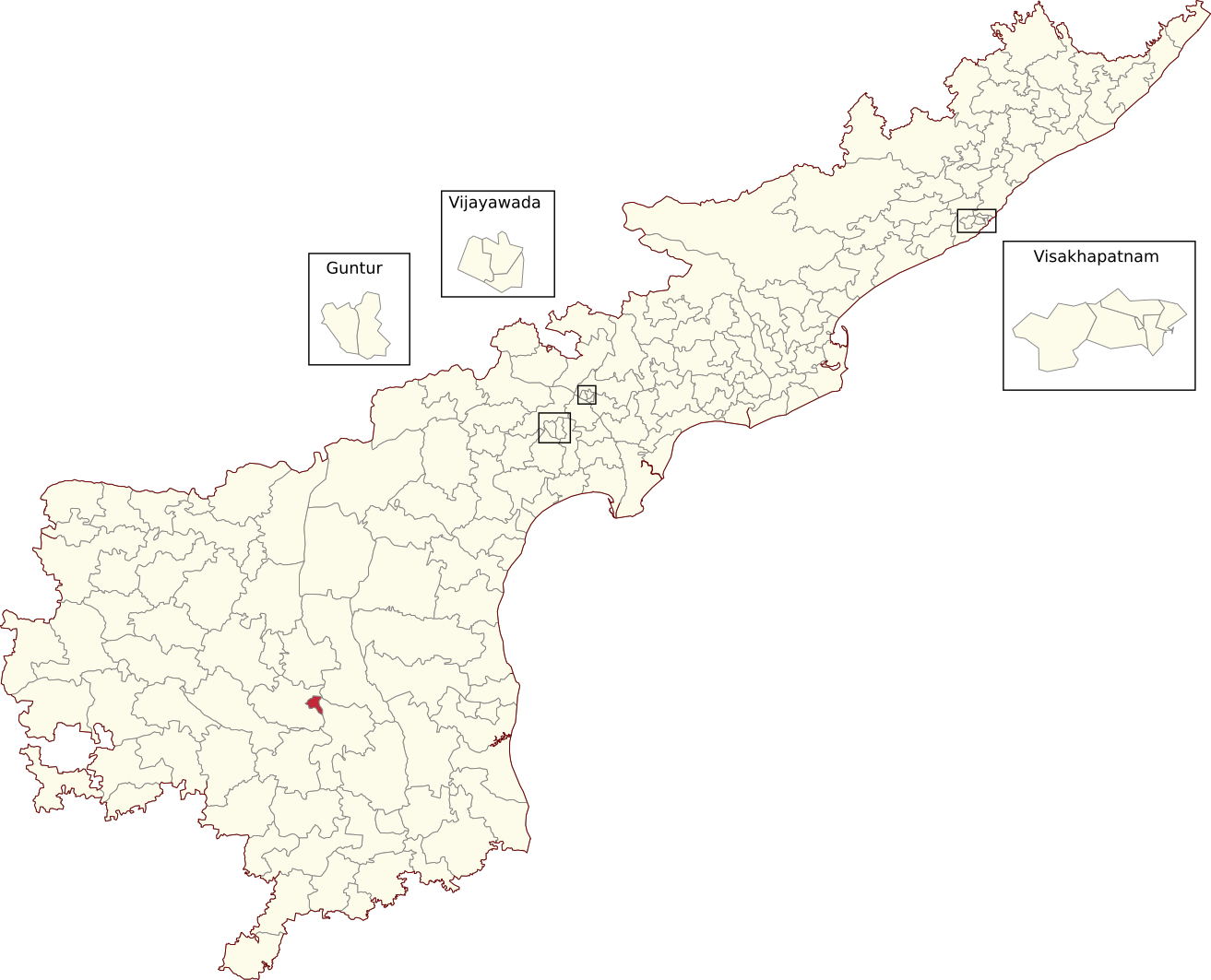
- Location of Kadapa Assembly constituency within Andhra Pradesh

Constituency details
- Country: India
- Region: South India
- State: Andhra Pradesh
- District: YSR Kadapa
- Lok Sabha constituency: Kadapa
- Established: 2008
- Total electors: 265,154
- Reservation: None

Member of Legislative Assembly
- 16th Andhra Pradesh Legislative Assembly
- Incumbent Reddeppagari Madhavi Reddy
- Party: TDP
- Alliance: NDA
- Elected year: 2024

Kadapa Assembly constituency is a constituency in YSR Kadapa district of Andhra Pradesh that elects representatives to the Andhra Pradesh Legislative Assembly in India. It is one of the seven assembly segments of Kadapa Lok Sabha constituency.

Reddeppagari Madhavi Reddy is the current MLA of the constituency, having won the 2024 Andhra Pradesh Legislative Assembly election from Telugu Desam Party. As of 2019, there are a total of 265,154 electors in the constituency.

== Mandals ==
Mandal
Kadapa

== Members of the Legislative Assembly ==
Year	Member	Political party
1952	K. Koti Reddi	Indian National Congress
1955	Shaik Mohammad Rahmatullah	Indian National Congress
1962	Pullaguri Seshaiah	Independent
1967	Shaik Mohammad Rahmatullah	Indian National Congress
1972	Gajjala Ranga Reddy	Indian National Congress
1978	Gajjala Ranga Reddy	Indian National Congress
1983	S. Ramamuni Reddy	Telugu Desam Party
1985	C. Ramachandraiah	Telugu Desam Party
1989	K. Sivananda Reddy	Indian National Congress
1994	S. A. Khaleel Basha	Telugu Desam Party
1999	S. A. Khaleel Basha	Telugu Desam Party
2004	Ahamadulla Mohammad Syed	Indian National Congress
2009	Ahamadulla Mohammad Syed	Indian National Congress
2014	Amzath Basha Shaik Bepari	YSR Congress Party
2019	Amzath Basha Shaik Bepari	YSR Congress Party
2024	Reddeppagari Madhavi Reddy	Telugu Desam Party

== Election results ==
=== 2024 ===
2024 Andhra Pradesh Legislative Assembly election: Kadapa
Party	Candidate	Votes	%	±%
TDP	Reddeppagari Madhavi Reddy	90,988	47.76	+17.75
YSRCP	Amzath Basha Shaik Bepari	72,128	37.86	−25.03
INC	Tumman Kalyal Afzal Ali Khan	24,500	12.86	+11.75
NOTA	None Of The Above	1,444	0.76	−0.11
Majority		18,860	9.89	
Turnout		1,90,527		
TDP gain from YSRCP		Swing		

=== 2019 ===
2019 Andhra Pradesh Legislative Assembly election: Kadapa
Party	Candidate	Votes	%	±%
YSRCP	Amzath Basha Shaik Bepari	104,822	62.89	+7.01
TDP	Ameer Babu Nawabjan	50,028	30.01	−0.72
JSP	Sunkara Sreenivas	5,385	3.23	new
INC	Nazeer Ahmed Shaik	1,863	1.11	
NOTA	None Of The Above	1,459	0.87	
Majority		54,794	30.88	
Turnout		1,66,679	62.86	+2.77
YSRCP hold		Swing		

=== 2014 ===
2014 Andhra Pradesh Legislative Assembly election: Kadapa
Party	Candidate	Votes	%	±%
YSRCP	Amzath Basha Shaik Bepari	95,077	55.88	
TDP	Durgaprasad Rao Sudha	49,872	30.73	
Majority		45,205	27.86	
Turnout		162,279	60.09	+0.11
YSRCP gain from INC		Swing		

=== 2009 ===
2009 Andhra Pradesh Legislative Assembly election: Kadapa
Party	Candidate	Votes	%	±%
INC	Ahmadulla Mohammad Syed	61,613	45.08	−11.65
TDP	Kandula Sivananda Reddy	54,263	39.70	−1.54
PRP	Afzal Alikhan.T.K	13,989	10.24	
Majority		7,350	5.38	
Turnout		136,674	59.98	+0.12
INC hold		Swing		

=== 2004 ===
2004 Andhra Pradesh Legislative Assembly election: Cuddapah
Party	Candidate	Votes	%	±%
INC	Ahmadulla Mohammad Syed	75,615	56.73	+11.48
TDP	Kandula Sivananda Reddy	54,959	41.24	−10.72
Majority		20,656	15.49	
Turnout		133,281	59.86	+5.66
INC gain from TDP		Swing		

=== 1952 ===
1952 Madras State Legislative Assembly election: Cuddapah
Party	Candidate	Votes	%	±%
INC	K. Koti Reddi	13,742	29.29%	29.29%
Independent	P. Seshiah Chetty	13,689	29.17%	
CPI	Borgala Peddi Reddy	10,694	22.79%	
KMPP	Mandli Veera Reddy	7,110	15.15%	
Independent	Gazulapille Veerachandra Rao	1,690	3.60%	
Margin of victory		53	0.11%	
Turnout		46,925	57.41%	
Registered electors		81,734		
INC win (new seat)				

== See also ==
- List of constituencies of Andhra Pradesh Legislative Assembly
