= C. Jagannatha Rao =

Indian politician

Chowti Jagannatha Rao

4th Deputy Chief Minister of Andhra Pradesh
- In office 24 February 1982 – 20 September 1982
- Preceded by: J.V. Narsing Rao
- Succeeded by: Koneru Ranga Rao
- Constituency: Narsapur

Minister of Home Affairs Government of Andhra Pradesh
- In office 1980–1983

Deputy Speaker of the Andhra Legislative Assembly Government of Andhra Pradesh
- In office 28 March 1972 – 18 March 1974

Personal details
- Born: 1932 Narsapur, Andhra Pradesh, India
- Died: 23 January 2012 (age 88)
- Party: Indian National Congress

Chowti Jagannatha Rao (1924 – 23 January 2012) was an Indian politician belonging to Indian National Congress, and served as the Deputy Chief Minister of Andhra Pradesh. He was very close to former prime minister PV Narasimha Rao. He belongs to Muthuraja community.

C. Jagannatha Rao served as deputy Chief Minister in the Cabinet of Bhavanam Venkatram in 1982. He was member of the Legislative Council for one term and represented Narsapur Assembly constituency in Medak district three times. He was Home Minister earlier in the Cabinet of T. Anjaiah in 1980. He was also president of Narsapur samithi in 1961. Jagannatha Rao was in the forefront of separate Telangana agitation in 1969.

== See also ==
- List of deputy chief ministers of Andhra Pradesh
- List of Telugu people
- Politics of Andhra Pradesh
