= Gangadhara Nellore Assembly constituency =

Constituency of the Andhra Pradesh Legislative Assembly, India

Coordinates: 13.23°N 79.18°E

Gangadhara Nellore
- Constituency No. 171 for the Andhra Pradesh Legislative Assembly
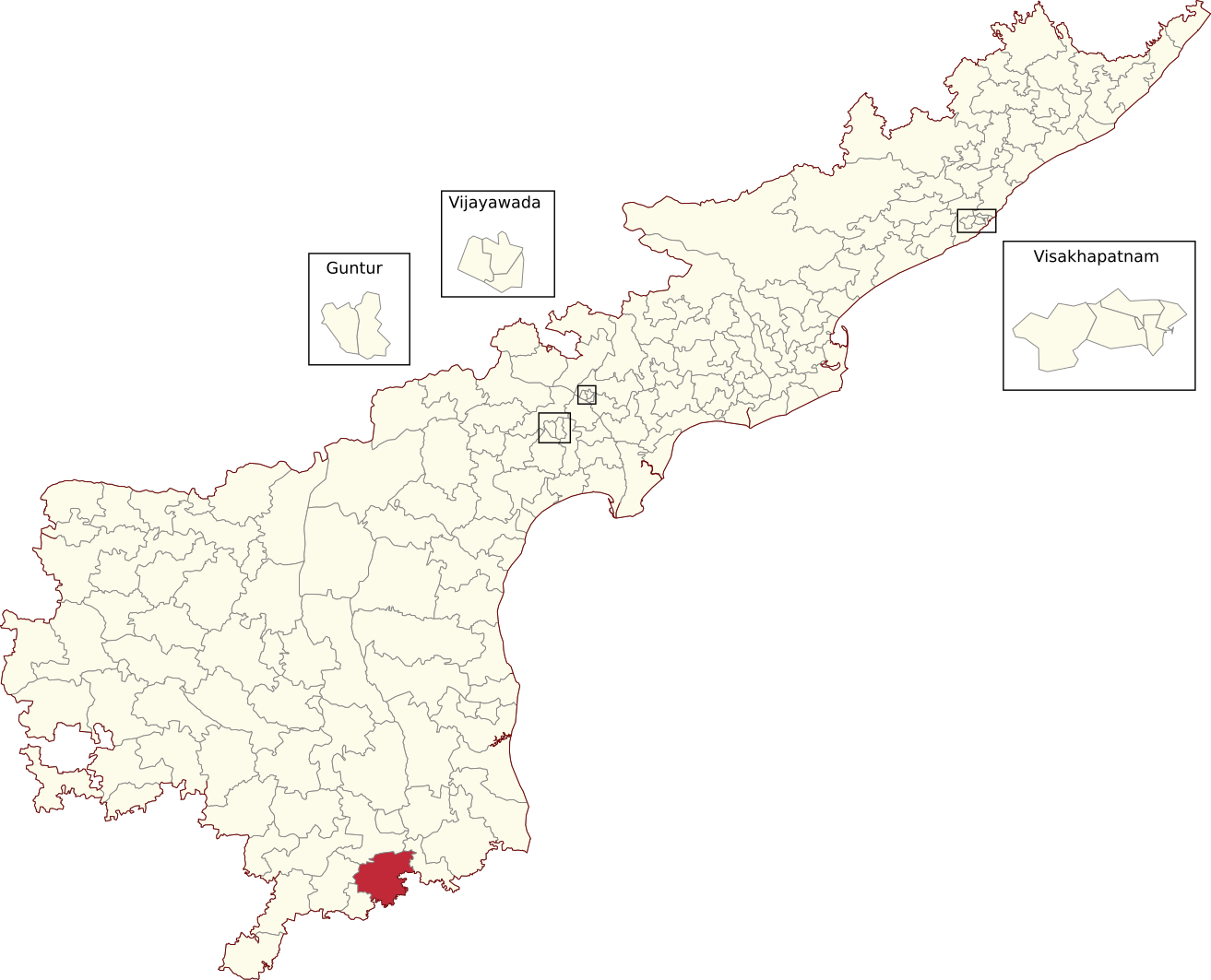
- Location of Gangadhara Nellore Assembly constituency within Andhra Pradesh

Constituency details
- Country: India
- Region: South India
- State: Andhra Pradesh
- District: Chittoor
- Lok Sabha constituency: Chittoor
- Established: 2008
- Total electors: 205,110
- Reservation: SC

Member of Legislative Assembly
- 16th Andhra Pradesh Legislative Assembly
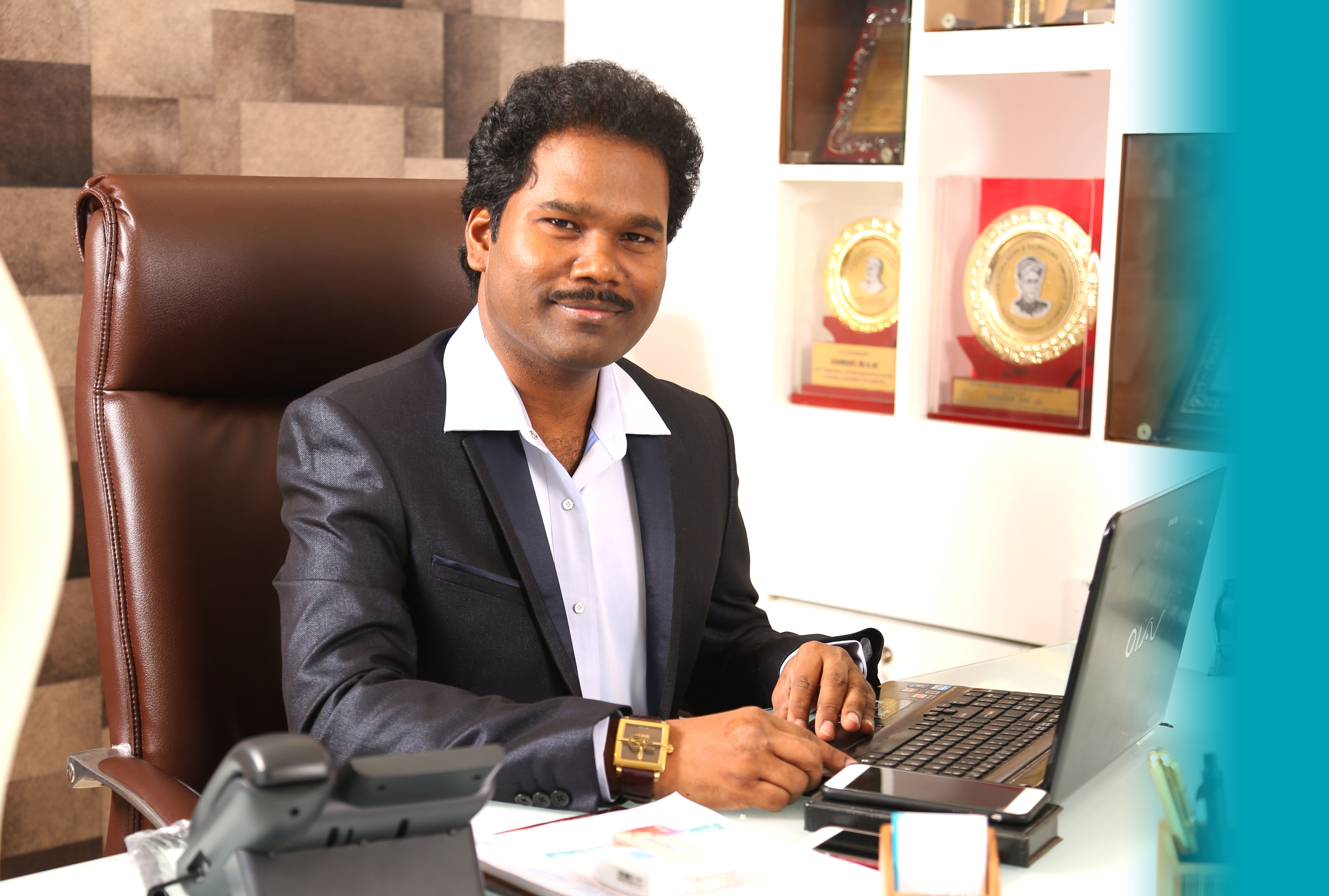
- Incumbent V. M. Thomas
- Party: TDP
- Alliance: NDA
- Elected year: 2024
- Preceded by: K. Narayana Swamy

Gandhara Nellore is a Scheduled Caste reserved constituency of Chittoor district of Andhra Pradesh that elects representatives to the Andhra Pradesh Legislative Assembly in India. It is one of the seven assembly segments of Chittoor Lok Sabha constituency. As of 2019, there are a total of 199,405 electors in the constituency. The constituency was established in 2008, as per the Delimitation Orders (2008). It has constituency number 171.

In the Gangadhara Nellore Assembly constituency, there were a total of 205110 registered voters on the electoral rolls for the 2024 Assembly election. V. M. Thomas won the 2024 Assembly election.

== Mandals ==
Mandal
Penumuru
Vedurukuppam
Karvetinagar
Srirangarajapuram
Gangadhara Nellore
Palasamudram

== Members of the Legislative Assembly ==
| Year | Member | Party |
|---|---|---|
| 2009 | Gummadi Kuthuhalamma | Indian National Congress |
| 2014 | K. Narayana Swamy | YSR Congress Party |
| 2019 | K. Narayana Swamy | YSR Congress Party |
| 2024 | Dr V. M. Thomas | Telugu Desam Party |

== Election results ==
=== 2024 ===
2024 Andhra Pradesh Legislative Assembly election: Gangadhara Nellore
| Party | Candidate | Votes | % | ±% |
|---|---|---|---|---|
| TDP | V. M. Thomas | 101,176 | 55.22 | |
| YSRCP | Kalathuru Krupa Lakshmi | 75,165 | 41.02 | |
| INC | Ramesh Babu Deyala | 2,682 | 1.46 | |
| Independent | K. Karuna Sree | 153 | 0.08 | |
| NOTA | None Of The Above | 2,125 | 1.16 | |
| Turnout | | 183,221 | | |
| Registered electors | | 205,110 | | |
| TDP gain from YSRCP | | Swing | 26,011 | |

=== 2019 ===
2019 Andhra Pradesh Legislative Assembly election: Gangadhara Nellore
| Party | Candidate | Votes | % | ±% |
|---|---|---|---|---|
| YSRCP | K. Narayana Swamy | 103,038 | 59.67 | |
| TDP | Anaganti Harikrishna | 57,444 | 33.27 | |
| JSP | Ugandhar .P | 3,364 | 1.95 | |
| NOTA | None of the Above | 2,829 | 1.64 | |
| INC | Sodem. Narasimhulu | 2,279 | 1.32 | |
| BJP | V. Rajendran | 1,572 | 0.91 | |
| MPP | Pallipattu Abhinav Vishnu | 563 | 0.33 | |
| Independent | Chenji. Madhu Babu | 384 | 0.22 | |
| ANC | G. Palani | 372 | 0.22 | |
| Independent | N. Rajesh | 348 | 0.2 | |
| JHP | Peruru. Ramaiah | 268 | 0.16 | |
| Independent | K. Chinnabba | 212 | 0.12 | |
| Total valid votes | | 172,673 | 86.39 | |
| Rejected ballots | | 1,249 | | |
| Turnout | | 173,922 | 87.02 | |
| Registered electors | | 199,874 | | |
| YSRCP hold | | Swing | 45,594 | |

=== 2014 ===
2014 Andhra Pradesh Legislative Assembly election: Gangadhara Nellore
| Party | Candidate | Votes | % | ±% |
|---|---|---|---|---|
| YSRCP | K. Narayana Swamy | 84,538 | 54.32 | |
| TDP | Kuthuhalam Gummadi | 63,973 | 41.11 | |
| INC | Narasimhulu Sodem | 1,967 | 1.26 | |
| BSP | Bhaskar Produtur | 1,522 | 0.98 | |
| JSP | K. Mani Krishna | 988 | 0.63 | |
| NOTA | None of the Above | 553 | 0.36 | |
| AAP | M. Prasad | 477 | 0.31 | |
| Independent | Kothapalli Sanker | 417 | 0.27 | |
| Independent | Penumur. Ramachandraiah | 335 | 0.22 | |
| Independent | Palyam Chinnabba | 224 | 0.14 | |
| Independent | N. Rajesh | 215 | 0.14 | |
| Independent | Peruru. Ramaiah | 175 | 0.11 | |
| Independent | Mallampalli Chengalrayulu | 120 | 0.08 | |
| Independent | M. Ravi | 119 | 0.08 | |
| Margin of victory | | 20,565 | 13.26 | |
| Total valid votes | | 155,623 | 84.33 | |
| Rejected ballots | | 51 | | |
| Turnout | | 155,674 | 84.36 | |
| Registered electors | | 184,535 | | |
| YSRCP gain from INC | | Swing | | |

=== 2009 ===
2009 Andhra Pradesh Legislative Assembly election: Gangadhara Nellore
| Party | Candidate | Votes | % | ±% |
|---|---|---|---|---|
| INC | Gummadi Kuthuhalamma | 62,249 | 45.62 | |
| TDP | Gandhi | 51,423 | 37.69 | |
| PRP | M. Nagabushanam | 12,405 | 9.09 | |
| Independent | Devarajulu | 4,409 | 3.23 | |
| BJP | V. Rajendran | 1,490 | 1.09 | |
| BSP | E. Murugaiah | 1,270 | 0.93 | |
| Independent | Kaveripakam Markondaiah | 909 | 0.67 | |
| Independent | N. Rajesh | 891 | 0.65 | |
| LSP | K. Jayaprakash | 686 | 0.50 | |
| RPI(A) | N. Jayakar | 415 | 0.30 | |
| BSSP | Siva Prasad | 295 | 0.22 | |
| Margin of victory | | 10,826 | 7.93 | |
| Total valid votes | | 136,442 | | |
| Rejected ballots | | 61 | | |
| Turnout | | 136,503 | 83.64 | |
| Registered electors | | 163,206 | | |
| INC win (new seat) | | | | |

== See also ==
- List of constituencies of the Andhra Pradesh Legislative Assembly
