= 12th Andhra Pradesh Assembly =

12th lower house of the andhra Pradesh Legislature (2004–2009)

←	11th	13th	→
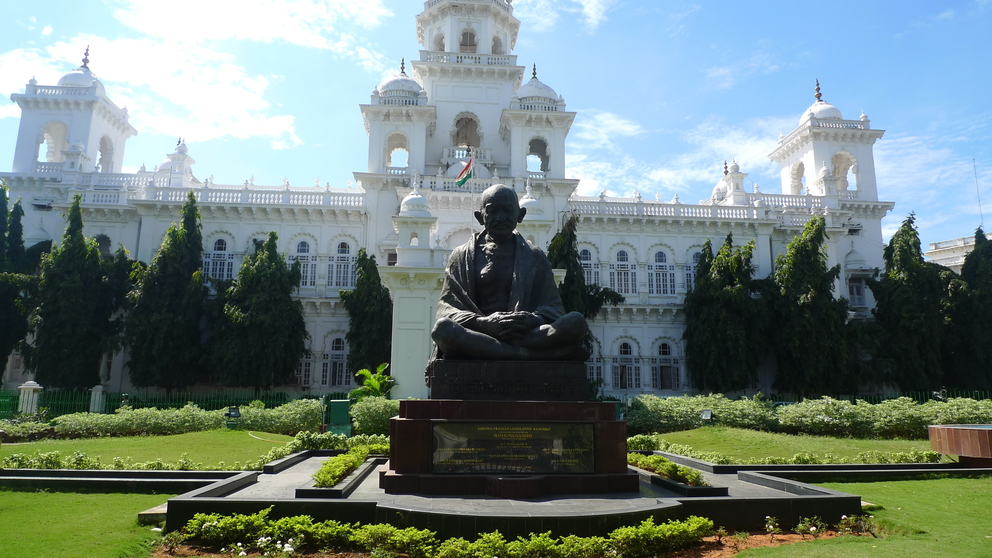
- Assembly Building; Hyderabad, Telangana, India

Overview
- Legislative body: Andhra Pradesh Legislature
- Jurisdiction: Andhra Pradesh
- Meeting place: Hyderabad
- Term: 31 May 2004 – 19 May 2009
- Election: 2004 Andhra Pradesh Legislative Assembly election
- Government: First Y. S. Rajasekhara Reddy ministry

Nominal Executive
- Governor: Surjit Singh Barnala

Andhra Pradesh Legislative Assembly
- Members: 294
- Speaker: K. R. Suresh Reddy
- Leader of the House: Y. S. Rajasekhara Reddy
- Chief Minister: Y. S. Rajasekhara Reddy
- Leader of the Opposition: N. Chandrababu Naidu
- Party control: INC

The twelfth Legislative Assembly of Andhra Pradesh was formed by the members elected in the 2004 Andhra Pradesh Legislative Assembly election. Election to Andhra Pradesh Legislative Assembly took place in single phase on 7 May 2004 by the Election Commission of India. Counting started officially on the morning of 2004 and the results were declared on the same day.

== Members ==
Designation	Name
Governor	Surjit Singh Barnala
Speaker	K. R. Suresh Reddy
Deputy Speaker	Gummadi Kuthuhalamma
Leader of the House (Chief Minister of State)	Y. S. Rajasekhara Reddy
Leader of the Opposition	N. Chandrababu Naidu
Secretary - AP Legislature	

=== Party-wise distribution of seats ===
Party wise distribution as of 2004
Party	Abbr.	Seats	Leader in Assembly
Indian National Congress	INC	185	Y. S. Rajasekhara Reddy
Telugu Desam Party	TDP	47	N. Chandrababu Naidu
Telangana Rashtra Samithi	TRS	26	
Independent politician	IND	11	
Communist Party of India (Marxist)	CPM	9	
Others	Oth	7	
Communist Party of India	CPI	6	
Bharatiya Janata Party	BJP	2	
TOTAL		294	–

== See also ==
- Andhra Pradesh Legislature
