= 13th Andhra Pradesh Assembly =

13th lower house of the andhra Pradesh Legislature (2009–2014)

13th Legislative Assembly of Andhra Pradesh
| ← | 12th | 14th | → |
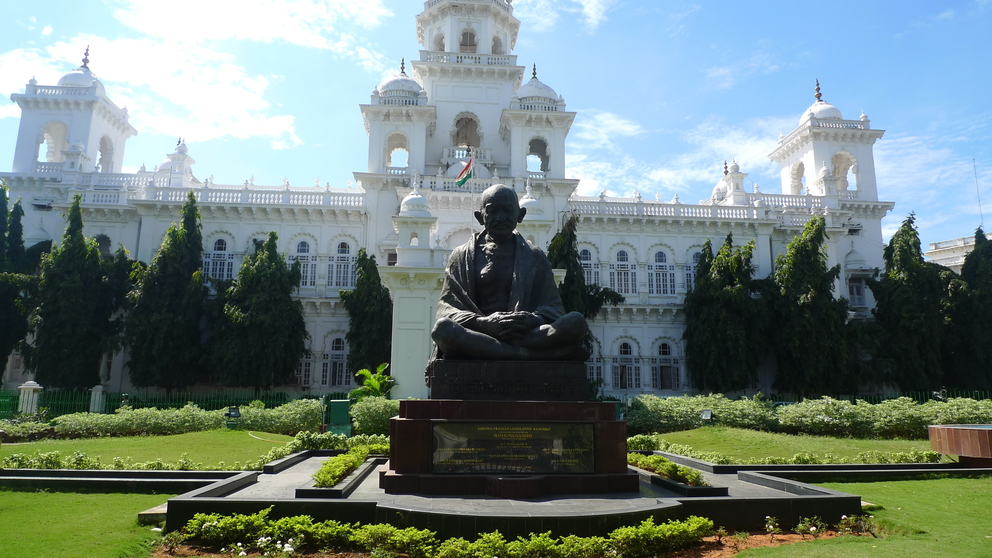
- Assembly Building in Hyderabad, Telangana, India

Overview
- Legislative body: Andhra Pradesh Legislature
- Term: 3 June 2009 – 28 April 2014
- Election: 2009 Andhra Pradesh Legislative Assembly election
- Government: Second Y. S. Rajasekhara Reddy ministry Konijeti Rosaiah Ministry; Kiran Kumar Reddy ministry
- Opposition: Telugu Desam Party

Nominal Executive
- Governor: N. D. Tiwari

Andhra Pradesh Legislative Assembly
- Members: 294
- Speaker: Kiran Kumar Reddy; Nadendla Manohar
- Leader of the House (Chief Minister): Y. S. Rajasekhara Reddy; Kiran Kumar Reddy
- Leader of the Opposition: N. Chandrababu Naidu
- Party control: Indian National Congress

The thirteenth Legislative Assembly of Andhra Pradesh was formed by the members elected in the 2009 Andhra Pradesh Legislative Assembly election. Election to Andhra Pradesh Legislative Assembly took place in single phase on 7 May 2014 by the Election Commission of India. Counting started officially on the morning of 16 May 2009 and the results were declared on the same day.

== Members ==
| Designation | Name |
|---|---|
| Governor | N. D. Tiwari |
| Speaker | Nadendla Manohar |
| Deputy Speaker | Mallu Bhatti Vikramarka |
| Leader of the House (Chief Minister of State) | Kiran Kumar Reddy |
| Leader of the Opposition | N. Chandrababu Naidu |
| Secretary - AP Legislature | |

=== Party-wise distribution of seats ===
Party wise distribution as of 2009
| Party | | Abbr. | Seats | Leader in Assembly |
|---|---|---|---|---|
| | Indian National Congress | INC | 156 | Kiran Kumar Reddy |
| | Telugu Desam Party | TDP | 92 | N. Chandrababu Naidu |
| | | Praja Rajyam Party | PRAP | 18 | Chiranjeevi |
| | Telangana Rashtra Samithi | TRS | 10 | Etela Rajender |
| | Others | Oth | 8 | |
| | Communist Party of India | CPI | 4 | |
| | Independent politician | IND | 3 | |
| | Bharatiya Janata Party | BJP | 2 | |
| | Communist Party of India (Marxist) | CPM | 1 | |
| TOTAL | | | 294 | – |

== See also ==
- Andhra Pradesh Legislature
