= Andhra Pradesh Reorganisation Act, 2014 =

2014 Indian Parliament act creating the state of Telangana from part of Andhra Pradesh

Parliament of India
- Long title: Andhra Pradesh Reorganisation Act, 2014
- Territorial extent: India
- Passed by: Lok Sabha
- Passed: 18 February 2014
- Passed by: Rajya Sabha
- Passed: 20 February 2014
- Assented to by: Pranab Mukherjee
- Assented to: 1 March 2014
- Signed by: Pranab Mukherjee
- Signed: 1 March 2014
- Commenced: 2 June 2014
- Effective: 2 June 2014

Legislative history

Initiating chamber: Lok Sabha
- Bill title: 13 February 2014
- Introduced by: Meira Kumar
- Introduced: 18 February 2014

Revising chamber: Rajya Sabha
- Bill title: 20 February 2014
- Received from the Lok Sabha: 20 February 2014
- Member(s) in charge: P. J. Kurien

Final stages
- Finally passed both chambers: 18 February 2014 (Lok Sabha); 20 February 2014 (Rajya Sabha)

Amended by
- Andhra Pradesh Reorganization Bill, 2026
- Status: In force

The Andhra Pradesh Reorganisation Act, 2014, commonly known as the Telangana Act, is an Act of Indian Parliament that split the state of Andhra Pradesh into Telangana and the residuary Andhra Pradesh state, as an outcome of the Telangana movement (Jai Telangana movement that started in 1969). The Act defined the boundaries of the two states, determined how the assets and liabilities were to be divided, and laid out the status of Hyderabad as the permanent capital of the new Telangana state and temporary capital of the Andhra Pradesh state.

An earlier version of the bill, Andhra Pradesh Reorganisation Act, 2013, was rejected by the Andhra Pradesh Legislative Assembly on 30 January 2014. The 2014 bill was passed in the Lok Sabha on 18 February 2014 and in the Rajya Sabha on 20 February 2014. The bill was attested by the President of India, Pranab Mukherjee on 1 March 2014 and published in the official Gazette on 2 March 2014, whereas 2 June 2014 is the 'appointed day' according to the act. The new states were created on 2 June 2014.

== Legislative history ==
The Union Cabinet formed a Group of Ministers (GoM) committee in August 2013 led by the Union Home Minister, Sushil Kumar Shinde to look into the suitability of a division of Andhra Pradesh. The members included the Finance Minister, P. Chidambaram, Health Minister Ghulam Nabi Azad, Petroleum Minister & Natural Gas Minister Veerappa Moily, Union Rural Development Minister Jairam Ramesh and minister of state in PMO Narayanaswamy. It also took the Srikrishna committee on Telangana into account.

A no-confidence motion against the Congress government was submitted to the speaker of the house Meira Kumari by Congress MPs from Andhra Pradesh making the sitting government a minority government, but was rejected by the speaker. Amidst a lot of protest in the Lok Sabha (the lower house of the Parliament of India), the bill was introduced by the speaker Meira Kumar at 12:00 pm on 13 February 2014. During this time, there was a lot of shouting of slogans and disruption of proceedings by the Seemandhra (non-Telangana) MPs in the parliament who were determined to stop the bill. The Indian National Congress MPs attacked the anti-Telangana protestors, and the MP Lagadapati Rajagopal used pepper spray in the parliament. Later he said he was attacked by some Congress MPs from other states and had to use it in self-defense. The parliament was then adjourned at 12:05 pm to 02:00 pm.

The leader of the opposition in the Lok Sabha Sushma Swaraj said she did not know if the bill was introduced. On 18 February 2014, the Telangana Bill was passed by a voice vote in the Lok Sabha with support from the Bharatiya Janata Party (BJP) while the live telecast of the House was cut off and the doors and galleries were sealed. The Seemandhra leaders held guilty by the United Progressive Alliance government of having taken it up for electoral gains and said it was a "black day" for the Indian parliament.

On 20 February, the Telangana bill was passed by the Rajya Sabha (the higher house of parliament) with support from the BJP. MPs from various parties asked for division but it was rejected by the speaker. Finally, the bill was passed by a voice vote.

The bill received the assent of the President and published in the Gazette on 1 March 2014.

=== Special category status ===
Jairam Ramesh said that the special category status for residual state of Andhra Pradesh is a decision of the Union Cabinet endorsed by the National Development Council (NDC) with the precedent of Uttarakhand. Uttarakhand was created by law in 2000 and got special category status only in 2002 by a decision of the Union Cabinet.

=== Suspension of members of parliament ===
Due to disruptions to the House, Meira Kumar suspended 18 MPs from Andhra Pradesh on 13 February 2014 for the rest of the session. They included 11 MPs of the Congress party (Sabbam Hari, Anantha Venkatarami Reddy, Rayapati Sambasiva Rao, S. P. Y. Reddy, M. Sreenivasulu Reddy, V. Aruna Kumar, A. Sai Prathap, Suresh Kumar Shetkar, K. R. G. Vasi Akash Kanumuri and G. Sukhender Reddy), three MPs of the Telugu Desam party (Niramalli Sivaprasad, Nimmala Kristappa, and K. Narayana Rao), two MPs of YSR Congress (Y. S. Jaganmohan Reddy and M. Rajamohan Reddy), and two other MPs from the Telangana region.

=== Resolution for the united Andhra Pradesh in Assembly ===
Though only an opinion is required under Article 3 of the Indian Constitution, a resolution was adopted and the bill was rejected by the Andhra Pradesh Legislative Assembly and Council on 30 January 2014. Only 119 out of 294 MLAs in state assembly are from Telangana. Non-Telangana MLAs opposed the bill. This was the first instance a state was re-organized after a state clearly expressed an opinion against the re-organization in Indian history.

== Petitions against the Bill in Supreme Court ==
Nine petitions were filed in the Supreme Court of India requesting a stay of the tabling of the Andhra Pradesh Reorganisation Bill in parliament. The court rejected the pleas saying, "We do not think this is the appropriate stage for us to interfere". They would only consider the petition if the bill was passed in parliament. But the court issued notices to the centre regarding the issue on 7 March 2014. The apex court would take up the issue on 5 May 2014. The next hearing in the Supreme Court was scheduled for 20 August 2014 One petitioner approached the Supreme Court praying that the parliament does not have the power either under Articles 3, 4(2) or any other provision of the Constitution of India to divide a state except by an appropriate amendment of the Constitution under article 368 and with the unanimous consent of the people of the affected State or States. While invoking Articles 2 & 3, the deemed constitutional amendment provision under article 4 (2) of the constitution bypassing Article 368 was said to be invalid after the 24th Amendment in 1971. The law ministry of the union government considered bringing appropriate amendments (including constitutional amendments) to the Act to bring legality to it.

The common high court of Andhra Pradesh and Telangana states stated that the division of the high court located at Hyderabad can only be done with the formation of separate high court for Andhra Pradesh located in that state as per section 31 of the Act. A separate high court for Telangana can not be formed by dividing the present common high court as the existing high court at Hyderabad would become high court of Telangana state after the formation of one for Andhra Pradesh.

On the applicability of the section 47 of Andhra Pradesh Reorganisation Act, 2014, the Supreme Court in its judgement clarified the manner the financial assets and liabilities of undivided state departments and corporations are to be shared between the new states. In an effort to avoid the huge financial burden to finance the creation of many institutions in the truncated AP state, the affidavit of central government clinched the dispute against Telangana state. AP state also decided to approach the Supreme Court regarding the discriminatory sharing of commercial taxes' income and refunds under sections 50, 51 and 56 of the act. The state was weary of the Central government's inaction for a long time to amend these sections such that it stood to lose INR 36 billion.

=== 2023: Supreme Court proceedings ===
The case was listed on 22 August 2023 for a hearing in the Supreme Court after repeatedly adjourning the hearings for the last six months without giving any reason. Nearly 31 active petitioners are going to present their arguments before the Supreme Court bench comprising Justices K.M. Josheph (to retire in June 2023), B.V. Nagaratna and J.B. Pardiwala. Since the case is related to constitutional matters, the proceedings would be telecast by live webcasting.

== Details of the Bill ==
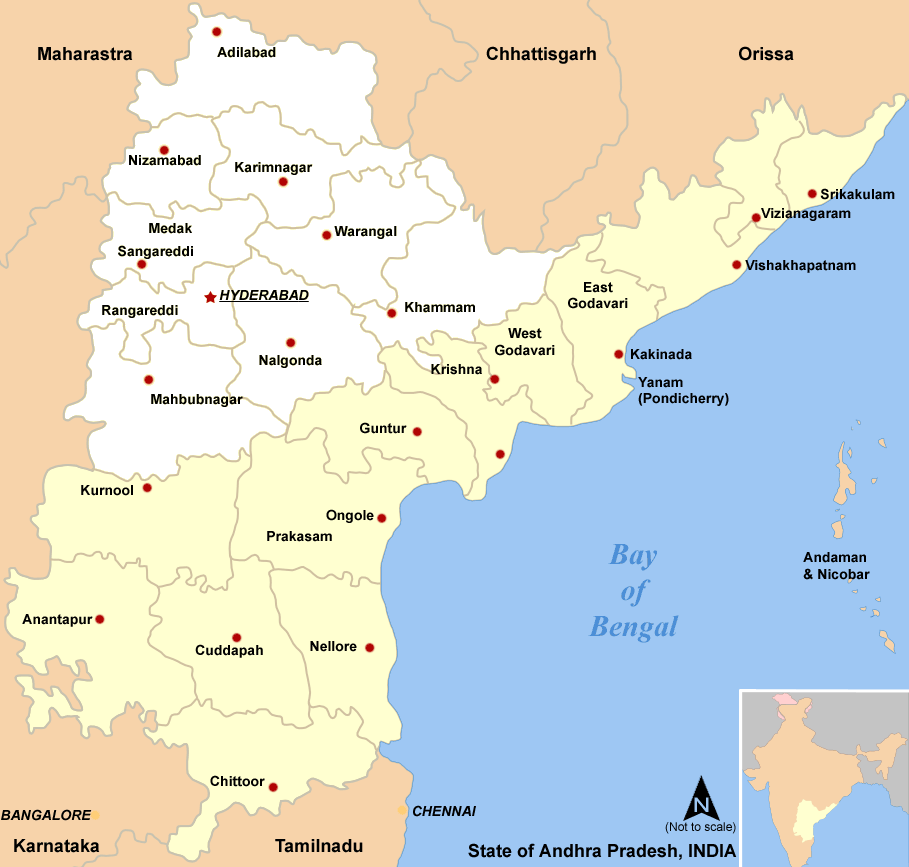
The former state of Andhra Pradesh prior to the act, with the districts separated to form Telangana in white, and those remaining in yellow

The bill was introduced on 5 December 2013, the first day of the winter session in the Legislative Assembly of Andhra Pradesh. The Union cabinet approved formation of Telangana with ten districts. Hyderabad will remain as the common capital under the Governor's supervision for not more than ten years. A new capital city for Andhra Pradesh would be declared in 45 days. The bill was drafted based on the boundaries of the proposed Telangana State as approved by the Union Cabinet in its meeting on 3 October 2013.

Resulting changes
Entity	Undivided Andhra Pradesh (before 2014)	New	
Entity	Undivided Andhra Pradesh (before 2014)	Andhra Pradesh	Telangana
Rajya Sabha Seats	18	11 (list)	7 (list)
Lok Sabha Seats	42	25 (list)	17 (list)
Legislative Assembly constituencies	294	175 (list)	119 (list)
Legislative Council constituencies	98	58 (list)	40 (list)

There would be a common High Court and its expenditure would be apportioned between the two successor states based on population ratio until a separate court was set up under Article 214 for the residuary state of Andhra Pradesh. The existing Public Service Commission would be the Public Service Commission for the residuary state of Andhra Pradesh and the Union Public Service Commission would, with the approval of President, act as the Public Service Commission for Telangana.

The Ministry of Water Resources of the Government of India would constitute a Krishna River Management Board and a Godavari River Management Board within a period of 60 days from the date of coming into force of the Andhra Pradesh Reorganisation Bill. The Boards would be responsible for the administration, regulation and maintenance of the head works of the dams, reservoirs or head works of canals, as notified by the Government of India on Krishna and Godavari rivers, to implement all the awards made by the Tribunals. The Boards would be responsible for making an appraisal of proposals for construction of new projects on Krishna and Godavari rivers and give technical clearance. While not agreeing for the fresh water allocation of Krishna river among all the four riparian states, the extended Justice Brijesh Kumar tribunal ruled that the water sharing between Andhra Pradesh and Telangana states would be finalised project wise from the water allocations made to erstwhile Andhra Pradesh state by earlier Bachawat tribunal. It also stated that the primary reason for the division of the erstwhile state was to “fulfil the political and democratic aspirations of the people of Telangana region,” and not inequitable sharing of water.

The Governor shall have special responsibility to the security of life, liberty and property of all those who reside in the common capital of Hyderabad. The Governor's responsibility shall extend to matters such as law and order, internal security and safety of all vital installations in the discharge of these functions. This transitory provision shall cease to have effect after a period not exceeding 10 years.

The Bill provides for the creation of separate cadres of All India Services in respect of the two states from the appointed day. Advisory Committee(s) would be constituted to ensure fair and equitable treatment of all employees.

The Government of India shall help the successor states of Telangana and Andhra Pradesh in raising additional police forces for maintenance of public order and shall also deploy one additional unit of the force in Hyderabad for a period of five years.

The Greyhound training centre in Hyderabad shall function as common training centre for the successor states for three years. In this period of three years, the GoI shall assist the successor state of Andhra Pradesh in setting up a similar training centre for Greyhounds. The existing Greyhound and OCTOPUS forces shall be distributed between the two states.

Of the total equity of Singareni Collieries Company Limited (SCCL), 51 per cent shall be with Government of Telangana and 49 per cent with Government of India. Existing coal linkages of SCCL shall continue without any change. New linkages shall be allotted to the successor States as per the new coal distribution policy by the Government of India.

Allocation of natural gas will continue to be done as per the policies and guidelines issued by the Government of India. The royalties payable on domestic on-shore production of oil and gas shall accrue to the state in which such production takes place. Allocation of power from Central generating stations shall be allocated to the successor states in the ratio of the average of the actual energy consumption of last five years of the relevant Discoms. For a period of 10 years, the successor state that has a deficit of electricity shall have the first right of refusal for the purchase of surplus power from the other state.

Later, the Polavaram ordinance merging the project-affected villages in the residuary Andhra Pradesh state was accepted by the Parliament in July 2014. Seven mandals from Khammam district of Telangana have been transferred to Andhra Pradesh. Four mandals from Bhadrachalam revenue division, namely Chinturu, Kunavaram, Vararamachandrapuram, Bhadrachalam (excluding the Bhadrachalam revenue village) were transferred to East Godavari district. Three mandals from Palvancha revenue division, namely Kukunoor, Velerupadu, Burgampadu (except 12 villages, namely Pinapaka, MorampalliBanjara, Laxmipuram, Burgampadu, Naginiprolu, Krishnasagar, Tekula, Sarapaka, Iravendi, Motepattinagar, Uppusaka, Nakiripeta and Sompalli), have been added to West Godavari district. This came into force as the 16th Lok Sabha has passed the Polavaram Ordinance Bill with the voice vote on 11 July 2014.

== New capital for residual Andhra Pradesh ==
On 4 September 2014, the Chief Minister of Andhra Pradesh, Nara Chandrababu Naidu, declared in the legislative assembly that the new capital of Andhra Pradesh would be developed in the Vijayawada region. The decision faced opposition in the assembly regarding the cost of land acquisition, with the YSR Congress Party suggesting building a capital where government land was already available.

The capital city was named as Amaravati on 1 April 2015, with the city to be developed between the cities of Vijayawada and Guntur.

In January 2020, the Andhra Pradesh legislative assembly passed two bills to split the capital into three cities, with the legislature situated in Amaravati, the courts in Kurnool, and executive offices in Visakhapatnam. Although the bills were approved by the governor, the High Court later determined that the legislature did not have the authority to change or split the capital, and ordered the state to complete development of Amaravati in the next six months.

In the first week of April 2026, Parliament passed the Andhra Pradesh Reorganisation (Amendment) Bill, 2026, which formally established Amaravati as the sole, permanent capital of Andhra Pradesh. That same day, YSR Congress party chief YS Jagan Mohan Reddy held a press conference proposing another alternative to Amaravati as the sole capital—development of a capital region in the urban corridor of Machilipatnam-Vijayawada-Guntur, deemed MaViGun.

== See also ==
- Part One of the Constitution of India
- President of India
- Amendment of the Constitution of India
- List of amendments of the Constitution of India
- State of Emergency in India
- Emergency provisions of the Constitution of India
- Telugu states

== Bibliography ==
- Jairam Ramesh (10 June 2016). Old History-New Geography : Bifurcating Andhra Pradesh. Rupa Publications India.
