= Mahabubnagar mandal =

- Mandal
- Country: India
- State: Telangana
- District: Mahabubnagar
- Headquarters: Mahabubnagar

Government
  - Body: Mandal Parishad

Languages
  - Official: Telugu
- Time zone: UTC+5:30 (IST)

Mahabubnagar mandal is one of the 64 mandals in Mahabubnagar district of the Indian state of Telangana. It is under the administration of Mahabubnagar revenue division and the headquarters are located at Mahabubnagar. The mandal is bounded by Nawabpet, Jadcherla, Bhoothpur, Addakal, Hanwada, Koilkonda and Devarakadra mandals.

== Towns and villages ==
As of 2011 census, the mandal has 43 settlements. It includes 2 towns and 41 villages.

The settlements in the mandal are listed below:

1. Allipur
2. Appaipalle
3. Boyapalle (CT)
4. Dharmapur
5. Fathepur
6. Jannappapalle
7. Kadur
8. Kotakadira
9. Machanpalle
10. Mahbubnagar (M)
11. Oblaipalle
12. Palakonda (R)
13. Ramchandrapur
14. Yedira (Part)
15. Yenugonda (CT)
16. Yerravalli
17. Zainallipur
18. Zamistapur
19. Mahbubnagar (R) (OG)
20. Venkatapur
21. Yedira (OG) (Part)

Note: M-Municipality, CT–Census town, OG–Out growth, R–Rural

== See also ==
- List of mandals in Telangana
