= Rachala =

Village in Telangana, India

Rachala (Rajyashala)
- Village
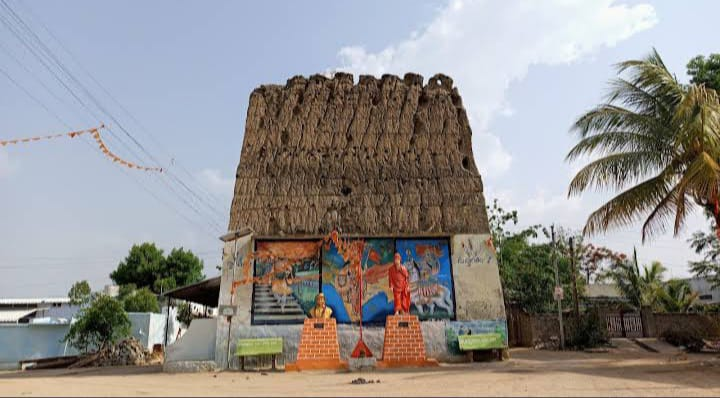

- Location in Telangana, India Rachala (India)
- Coordinates: 16°32′36″N 77°53′41″E
- Country: India
- State: Telangana
- Region: Deccan
- District: Mahabubnagar
- Tehsil (Mandal): Addakal
- Village: Rachala

Government
  - Body: Local Self Government
  - Village Sarpanch: Boyapalle Raju
  - MLA: Gavinolla Madhusudan Reddy
  - MP: D. K. Aruna BJP
- Elevation: 387 m (1,270 ft)

Languages
  - Official: Telugu & Hindi
- Time zone: UTC+5:30 (IST)
- PIN: 509219
- Telephone code: 08545
- Vehicle registration: TG-06/TS-06(Old)/AP-22(Old)
- Planning Agency: Palamuru Urban Development Authority (PUDA)
- Lok Sabha Constituency: Mahabubnagar
- Vidhan Sabha Constituency: Devarakadra
- Climate: hot (Köppen)
- Website: mahabubnagar.telangana.gov.in

Rachala is a village in Addakal Mandal in Mahbubnagar District of Telangana State, India. Telugu is the local language here. As of 2011, the total population of Rachala is 3772. Males are 1886 and females are 1865 living in 746 houses. The total area of Rachala is 1748 hectares and has a literacy rate of 46.8%

== Geography ==
Rachala is located at 16°32′36″N 77°53′41″E. It has an average elevation of 361 metres (1184 feet). The village of Rachala is located at a distance of 129 km from Hyderabad 109 km from Kurnool and 100 km from Raichur.

== History ==
The oldest history is concealed in the annals of this royal village. Previously, this village was known as "Rajashala", which changed over time to become "Rachala." The Vamsiyas of the Pallava kings ruled the village from the sixth to the ninth century. According to history, the later era was ruled by the Yadavas, Kanduri Chodas, and Kakatiyas. At last, Rachala environs came under the authority of Rani Rudramadevi Queen of Kakatiya Dynasty. In order to keep the village safe from the enemy, Gona Ganna Reddy, the commander of the Prataparudra army, constructed a two-story fort at Pradhanakudali that stands 60 feet tall. The remnants of eight smaller forts that were constructed nearby are still in ruins. It is said that this village was known as "Rajashala" in the days of Gona Ganna Reddy and changed its name to Rachala over time. Famous Ayurvedic doctors from this village, like Gaddenagesam, learned Ayurvedic Medicine from the royal doctors of Wanaparthy Rajarameswara Rao's court when Wanaparthy came under colonial rule. It is also well known that the Shiva temple constructed by the Chalukyas twelve hundred years ago is highly visited. The oldest Anjaneyaswamy temple and one of the rarest temples in Telangana, the Saraswati temple, are located in the village of Rachala.

== Demographics ==
As per final data of 2011 census, Rachala Village agglomeration had a population of 3772. The literacy rate of Rachala was 53.98 per cent at the time of the 2011 census.

Literacy in Rachala
All	53.98%
Male	64.91%
Female	42.84%

== Education ==
There are schools in this village:

- Mandal Parishad Primary School
- Zilla Parishad High School
- Private Kindergarten School
- Nearest Govt Junior College Addakal
- Nearest Government Arts / Science Degree College, Engineering College Mahabubnagar.
- Nearest Medical College, Management College, Polytechnic Mahabubnagar.
- Nearest Vocational Training School, Informal Education Centre and Special School for Handicapped are in Mahabubnagar.

== Medical facilities ==
A Primary health sub-centre in Rachala has no doctors. There are two paramedical staff. A veterinary hospital has one doctor and one paramedical staff. There are three paramedical staff. Social Health Centre, Primary Health Centre, Maternal Child Care Centre, T.B Hospital is more than 10 k.m from the village. The family welfare centre is more than 10 k.m from the village.

There are two private medical facilities in the village. There are two doctors without degrees.

== Transport ==
Rachala is connected to major towns and villages by means of road, railway and airway. National and state highways that pass near by the village are NH 44 and NH 167, State highway 20 and 23. TSRTC operates buses to this village from Mahbubnagar Bus Station of the city. Rajiv Gandhi International Airport is 120 km from the village.

The village is 3 km from Kaukuntla Railway Station and 20 km from Mahbubnagar railway station.

== Religion ==
Religions in Rachala (2011)
Religion	Percent
Hindu	99.00%
Islam	1.00%
Christianity	0.00%
Distribution of religions

As per final data of 2011 census, Hindus formed the majority in the Rachala agglomeration. Other religious groups found in Rachala are Muslims, and not found Christians,

== Language ==
Languages of Rachala village (2011)
1. Telugu (99.0%)
2. Hindi (1.00%)

Telugu (99%) is the official and most spoken language. Hindi (1%) is also spoken.

== Land Use ==
The land use in Rachala is as follows:

- Land under non-agricultural use: 151 hectares
- Non-cultivable and barren land: 173 hectares
- Permanent pasture areas, other grazing land: 14 hectares
- Land under plantation etc.: 11 hectares
- Cultivable barren land: 4 hectares
- Uncultivated lands other than waste lands: 242 hectares
- Barren land: 730 hectares
- Net sown land: 420 hectares
- Land without water facility: 926 hectares
- Land irrigated from various sources: 467 hectares

== Temples ==
The historical temples in Rachala village are well-known. The Shiva Temple is one of these significant temples. The locals think that 1200 years ago was when this temple was constructed. Additionally, Hanuman Temple, Sri Chennakeshava Temple and Saraswati Temple — three of the oldest temples — can be visited here. It is known that these temples were constructed a few hundred years ago.

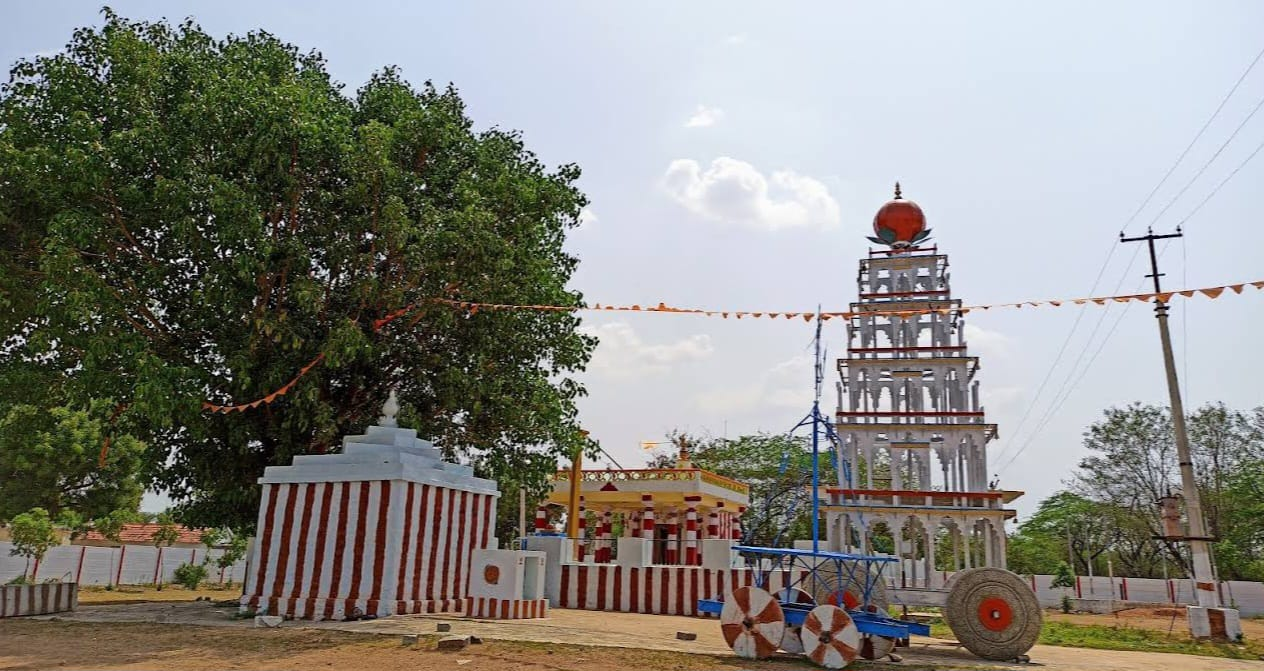
Sri Chennakesava Swamy Temple

== Agriculture ==
Major crops are rice, cotton, peanut, ricinus, maize, finger millet, sorghum and pigeon pea.

== Grama Panchayat ==
Rachala Grampanchayat Sarpanch list below

Duration	Name of the Sarpanch
1968-1973	Kareddy Narsimha Reddy
1973-1978	Sekula Narayana
1978-1983	Sangireddy Narayana Reddy
1983-1988	Chintakayala Hanmanthu
1988-1993	Kareddy Sudakar Reddy
1993-1998	Boyapally Venkatanna
1998-2002	Chintakayala Madan Mohan
2002-2008	Gopi Anandam
2008-2012	Pasham Sunitha
2013-2018	Sangireddy Satyamma
2019-2024	Pasham Thirupathaiah
2026–Present	Boyapalle Raju

== Notable People ==
- V Srinivas Goud – Ex Minister of Telangana State
