= Jadcherla Assembly constituency =

Constituency of the Telangana legislative assembly in India

Coordinates: 16.76°N 78.14°E

Jadcherla
- Constituency No. 75 for the Telangana Legislative Assembly
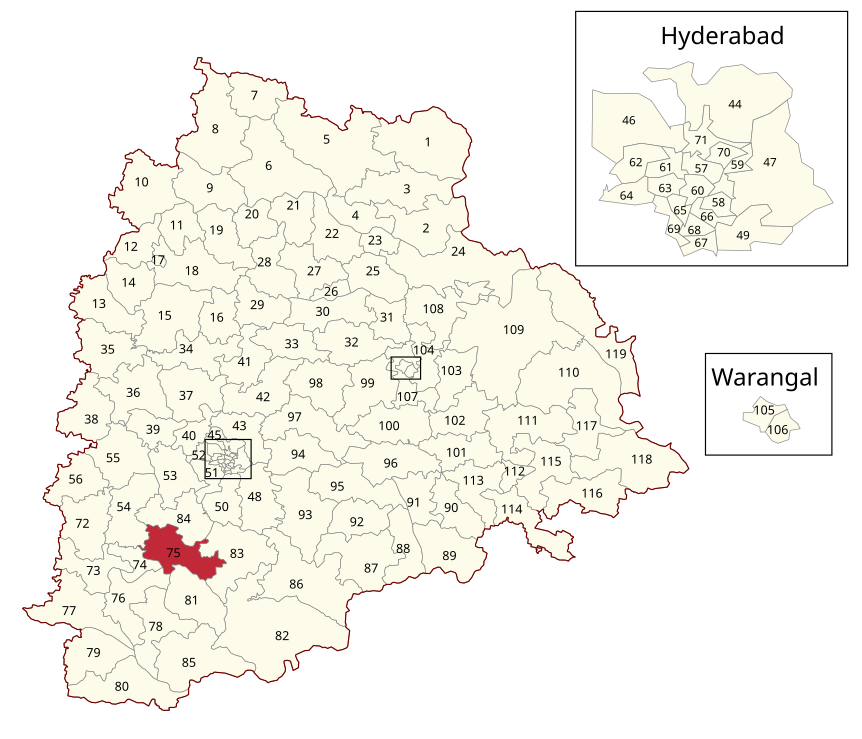
- Location of Jadcherla Assembly constituency within Telangana

Constituency details
- Country: India
- Region: South India
- State: Telangana
- District: Mahbubnagar
- Lok Sabha constituency: Mahabubnagar
- Established: 1951
- Total electors: 1,88,154
- Reservation: None

Member of Legislative Assembly
- 3rd Telangana Legislative Assembly
- Incumbent Anirudh Reddy Janampalli
- Party: Indian National Congress
- Elected year: 2023

Jadcherla Assembly constituency is a constituency of the Telangana Legislative Assembly, India. It is one of the constituencies in Mahbubnagar district. It is part of Mahabubnagar Lok Sabha constituency.

Janampalli Anirudh Reddy is currently representing the constituency.

== Mandals ==
The assembly constituency presently comprises the following mandals:

Mandal
Jadcherla
Nawabpet
Balanagar
Midjil

== Members of Legislative Assembly ==
Year	Member	Political party
Andhra Pradesh
1962	Keshavulu	Independent
1967	L. N. Reddy	Independent
1972	N. Narasappa	Indian National Congress
1978	N. Narasappa	Indian National Congress
1983	M. Krishna Reddy	Telugu Desam Party
1985	M. Krishna Reddy	Telugu Desam Party
1989	Sudhakar Reddy	Indian National Congress
1994	Satyanarayana	Telugu Desam Party
1996	Marati Chandra Shekar	Telugu Desam Party
1999	Marati Chandra Shekar	Telugu Desam Party
2004	C. Laxma Reddy	Telangana Rashtra Samithi
2008	Mallu Ravi	Indian National Congress
2009	Marati Chandra Shekar	Telugu Desam Party
Telangana
2014	C. Laxma Reddy	Telangana Rashtra Samithi
2018	C. Laxma Reddy	Telangana Rashtra Samithi
2023	Janampalli Anirudh Reddy	Indian National Congress

== Election results ==
=== 2023 ===
Telangana Assembly Elections, 2023: Jadcherla (Assembly constituency)
Party	Candidate	Votes	%	±%
INC	Janampalli Anirudh Reddy	90,865	50.30	
BRS	C. Laxma Reddy	75,694	41.90	
BJP	Chittaranjan Das. J	7,312	4.05	
BSP	Shiva Kumar	1,725	0.95	
NOTA	None of the Above	1,655	0.92	
Majority		15,171	8.40	
Turnout		1,80,640		
INC gain from BRS		Swing		

=== 2018 ===
Telangana Assembly Elections, 2018: Jadcherla (Assembly constituency)
Party	Candidate	Votes	%	±%
TRS	C. Laxma Reddy	94,598	58.95	
INC	Mallu Ravi	49,516	30.85	
BJP	Dr. Chinnala Madhusudhan	3,601	2.24	
NOTA	None of the Above	1,117	0.70	
Majority		45,082	28.10	
Turnout		1,60,482	82.32	
TRS hold		Swing		

=== 2014 ===
Telangana Assembly Elections, 2014: Jadcherla (Assembly constituency)
Party	Candidate	Votes	%	±%
TRS	C. Laxma Reddy	70,654	48.27	
INC	Mallu Ravi	55,920	38.21	
TDP	Marati Chandra Shekar	11,465	7.83	
Independent	Nadiminti Srinivasulu	2,931	2.00	
YSRCP	M. Pandu Naik	1,738	1.19	
NOTA	None of the above	1,537	1.05	
Majority		14,734	10.06	
Turnout		1,46,363	76.60	
TRS gain from TDP		Swing		

=== 2009 ===
2009 Andhra Pradesh Legislative Assembly election: Jadcherla
Party	Candidate	Votes	%	±%
TDP	M. Chandra Shekar	66,857	47.68	
INC	Dr. Mallu Ravi	53,320	38.03	
PRP	Dr. V. Ram Reddy	8,945	6.38	
PPOI	Pasula Gangadhar Reddy	2,261	1.61	
BJP	Dr. Gollamari Shoury	2,082	1.48	
Independent	Sreevidya	1,850	1.32	
BSP	Anand	1,437	1.02	
LSP	Srinu	1,143	0.82	
Independent	Gangapuram Chinna Yellaiah	858	0.61	
TPPP	G. Yadaiah	766	0.55	
Independent	K. Prakash	696	0.50	
Majority		13,537	9.65	
Turnout		140,215	71.31	
TDP gain from TRS		Swing		

=== 2004 ===
2004 Andhra Pradesh Legislative Assembly election: Jadcherla
Party	Candidate	Votes	%	±%
TRS	Charlakola Laxma Reddy	63,480	51.96	
TDP	M. Chandra Shekar	45,099	36.92	
PPOI	B. Raghunandan	5,493	4.50	
Independent	K. Narsing Ravach	3,610	2.96	
BSP	G. Srinivasulu	2,636	2.16	
Independent	Potula Swathi	1,840	1.51	
Majority		18,381	15.04	
Turnout				
TRS gain from TDP		Swing		

=== 1999 ===
1999 Andhra Pradesh Legislative Assembly election: Jadcherla
Party	Candidate	Votes	%	±%
TDP	M. Chandra Shekar	49,450	45.45	
INC	Mohd. Allaji	24,808	22.80	
Independent	Cherlakola Laxma Reddy	23,174	21.30	
ATDP	Seetharam Jhawar	8,220	7.55	
MCPI(S)	Ramavath Valiya	2,743	2.52	
AJBP	Alladi Srinivas Rao	415	0.38	
Majority		24,642	22.65	
Turnout		114,489	70.06	
TDP hold		Swing		

=== 1994 ===
1994 Andhra Pradesh Legislative Assembly election: Jadcherla
Party	Candidate	Votes	%	±%
TDP	Satyanarayana	72,758	71.93	
INC	Pedda Narasappa	18,979	18.76	
Independent	M. Krishna Reddy	4,414	4.36	
BJP	V. Srinivasulu	2,174	2.15	
BSP	Purandas Naik	1,340	1.32	
Independent	Busamma	621	0.61	
Independent	G. Balaswamy	375	0.37	
Independent	Tirupathaiah	303	0.30	
Independent	Andnd	188	0.19	
Majority		53,779	53.17	
Turnout		104,156	72.46	
TDP hold		Swing		

=== 1989 ===
1989 Andhra Pradesh Legislative Assembly election: Jadcherla
Party	Candidate	Votes	%	±%
INC	Sudhakar Reddy	42,285	48.66	
TDP	M. Krishna Reddy	41,234	47.45	
BSP	Kongali Nagaraju	1,581	1.82	
JP	Golla Chandraiah	1,506	1.73	
Independent	Swamy Reddy	295	0.34	
Majority		1,051	1.21	
Turnout		92,154	68.58	
INC gain from TDP		Swing		

=== 1985 ===
1985 Andhra Pradesh Legislative Assembly election: Jadcherla
Party	Candidate	Votes	%	±%
TDP	M. Krishna Reddy	38,045	54.25	
INC	N. Narasappa	23,840	34.00	
Independent	Ramdas	4,912	7.00	
Independent	Mallu Masi Reddy	1,537	2.19	
Independent	M. B. Balakrishna	784	1.12	
Independent	Pasupunoori Anantha Rao	596	0.85	
Independent	Srinivasulu	273	0.39	
Independent	S. S. Hyder	140	0.20	
Majority		14,205	20.25	
Turnout		72,056	65.68	
TDP gain from Independent		Swing		

=== 1983 ===
1983 Andhra Pradesh Legislative Assembly election: Jadcherla
Party	Candidate	Votes	%	±%
Independent	Krishna Reddy	31,803	51.73	
INC	N. Narasappa	25,985	42.27	
LKD	Mallu Masi Reddy	2,098	3.41	
Independent	Basheeruddin	1,593	2.59	
Majority		5,818	9.46	
Turnout		63,390	63.95	
Independent gain from INC(I)		Swing		

=== 1978 ===
1978 Andhra Pradesh Legislative Assembly election: Jadcherla
Party	Candidate	Votes	%	±%
INC(I)	N. Narasappa	32,707	58.26	
JP	Raghunandan Reddy	14,967	26.66	
INC	Meghnath Chauhan	6,768	12.06	
Independent	K. Anant Reddy	1,698	3.02	
Majority		17,740	31.60	
Turnout		58,179	65.69	
INC(I) gain from INC		Swing		

=== 1972 ===
1972 Andhra Pradesh Legislative Assembly election: Jadcherla
Party	Candidate	Votes	%	±%
INC	N. Narasappa	25,201	58.41	
Independent	Gubba Viswanatham	15,381	35.65	
Independent	Dalapathy Malliah	2,564	5.94	
Majority		9,820	22.76	
Turnout		44,979	56.89	
INC gain from Independent		Swing		

=== 1967 ===
1967 Andhra Pradesh Legislative Assembly election: Jadcherla
Party	Candidate	Votes	%	±%
Independent	L. N. Reddy	19,135	54.04	
INC	M. R. D. Reddy	14,465	40.85	
ABJS	S. S. Rao	1,810	5.11	
Majority		4,670	13.19	
Turnout		37,526	57.39	
Independent hold		Swing		

=== 1962 ===
1962 Andhra Pradesh Legislative Assembly election: Jadcherla
Party	Candidate	Votes	%	±%
Independent	Keshavulu	17,927	57.78	
INC	K. Janardhan Reddy	13,097	42.22	
Majority		4,830	15.56	
Turnout		32,304	56.48	
Independent win (new seat)				

== See also ==
- List of constituencies of Telangana Legislative Assembly
