= Devarkadra Assembly constituency =

Constituency of the Telangana legislative assembly in India

Coordinates: 16.62°N 77.84°E

Devarkadra
- Constituency No. 76 for the Telangana Legislative Assembly
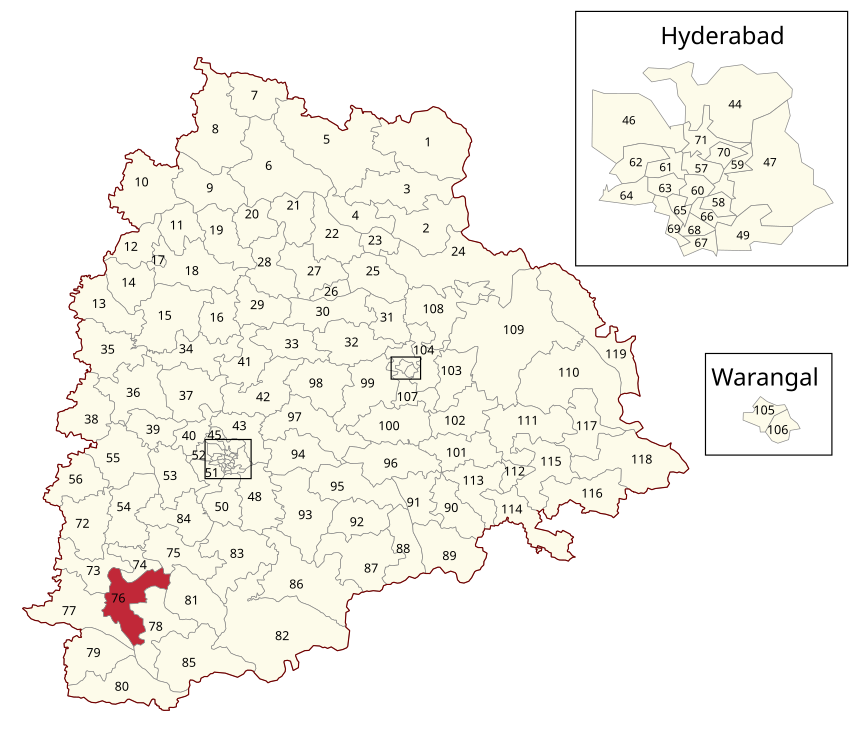
- Location of Devarkadra Assembly constituency within Telangana

Constituency details
- Country: India
- Region: South India
- State: Telangana
- District: Mahbubnagar
- Lok Sabha constituency: Mahabubnagar
- Established: 2008
- Total electors: 205,324
- Reservation: None

Member of Legislative Assembly
- 3rd Telangana Legislative Assembly
- Incumbent Gavinolla Madhusudan Reddy
- Party: Indian National Congress
- Elected year: 2023

Devarkadra Assembly constituency is a constituency of Telangana Legislative Assembly, India. It is one among constituencies in Mahbubnagar district. It is part of Mahbubnagar Lok Sabha constituency.

Gavinolla Madhusudan Reddy of Indian National Congress won the 2023 Telangana Legislative Assembly election by margin of 1,392 votes.

== Mandals ==
The Assembly Constituency presently comprises the following Mandals:

| Mandal | District |
|---|---|
| Devarkadra | Mahbubnagar |
| Bhoothpur | Mahbubnagar |
| Addakal | Mahbubnagar |
| Chinna Chintakunta | Mahbubnagar |
| Kothakota | Wanaparthy |
| Madanapur | Wanaparthy |
| Moosapet | Mahbubnagar |

== Members of the Legislative Assembly ==
| Election | Name | Party |
Andhra Pradesh
| 2009 | Seetha Dayakar Reddy | Telugu Desam Party |
Telangana
| 2014 | Alla Venkateshwar Reddy | Telangana Rashtra Samithi |
| 2018 | Alla Venkateshwar Reddy | Telangana Rashtra Samithi |
| 2023 | Gavinolla Madhusudan Reddy | Indian National Congress |

== Election results ==
=== Telangana Legislative Assembly election, 2023 ===
Telangana Assembly Elections, 2023: Devarkadra
| Party | Candidate | Votes | % | ±% |
|---|---|---|---|---|
| INC | Gavinolla Madhusudan Reddy | 88,551 | 45.31 | |
| BRS | Alla Venkateshwar Reddy | 87,159 | 44.60 | |
| BJP | Konda Prashanth Reddy | 13,164 | 6.74 | |
| BSP | Basireddy Santhosh Reddy | 1,909 | 0.98 | |
| NOTA | None of the Above | 1,706 | 0.87 | |
| Majority | | 1,392 | 0.71 | |
| Turnout | | 1,95,423 | | |
| INC gain from BRS | | Swing | | |

=== Telangana Legislative Assembly election, 2018 ===
2018 Telangana Legislative Assembly election: Devarkadra
| Party | Candidate | Votes | % | ±% |
|---|---|---|---|---|
| TRS | Alla Venkateshwar Reddy | 96,130 | 55.12% | |
| INC | Dokur Pavan Kumar Reddy | 60,882 | 34.91% | |
| SFB | A Venkateshwar Reddy | 5,937 | 3.40 | |
| BJP | Aggani Narsimulu | 5,174 | 2.97 | |
| NOTA | None of the Above | 2,689 | 1.54 | |
| Independent Candidate | Jannampally Vinod Kumar | 509 | 0.1% | |
| Majority | | 35,248 | | |
| Turnout | | 1,74,410 | 85.11 | |
| TRS hold | | Swing | | |

=== 2014 ===
2014 Telangana Legislative Assembly election: Devarkadra
| Party | Candidate | Votes | % | ±% |
|---|---|---|---|---|
| TRS | Alla Venkateshwar Reddy | 66,354 | 44.23 | |
| INC | Pavan Kumar | 49,432 | 32.95 | |
| TDP | Seethamma | 24,422 | 16.28 | |
| NOTA | None of the above | 1,213 | 0.81 | |
| IND | 4 Independent Candidates | 8,603 | 5.72 | |
| Majority | | 16,922 | 11.28 | |
| Turnout | | 1,50,024 | 71.98 | |
| TRS gain from TDP | | Swing | | |

=== 2009 ===
2009 Andhra Pradesh Legislative Assembly election: Devarkadra
| Party | Candidate | Votes | % | ±% |
|---|---|---|---|---|
| TDP | Seetha Dayakar Reddy | 58,576 | 41.37 | |
| INC | S. Swarna Sudhakar | 39,540 | 27.93 | |
| IND | Ravula Ravindranath Reddy | 21,660 | 15.30 | |
| PRP | K. S. Ravi Kumar | 12,769 | 9.02 | |
| IND | 6 Independent Candidates | 3,632 | 2.57 | |
| OTH | 4 Other Party Candidates | 5,405 | 3.82 | |
| Majority | | 19,036 | 13.44 | |
| Turnout | | 1,41,582 | 68.68 | |
| TDP win (new seat) | | | | |

== See also ==
- List of constituencies of Telangana Legislative Assembly
