= Annasagar =

Annasagar may refer to any of the following places in Telangana state, India:

- Annasagar, Nizamabad, a village in Yellareddy mandal, Nizamabad district
- Annasagar, Ranga Reddy, a village in Yelal mandal, Ranga Reddy district
- Annasagar, Bhoothpur, a village in Bhoothpur mandal, Mahabubnagar district
- Annasagar, Damaragidda, a village in Damaragidda mandal, Mahabubnagar district

== See also ==
- Ana Sagar Lake, an artificial lake in Rajasthan state
