= Narayanpet Assembly constituency =

Constituency of the Telangana legislative assembly in India

Coordinates: 16.75°N 77.50°E

Narayanpet
- Constituency No. 73 for the Telangana Legislative Assembly
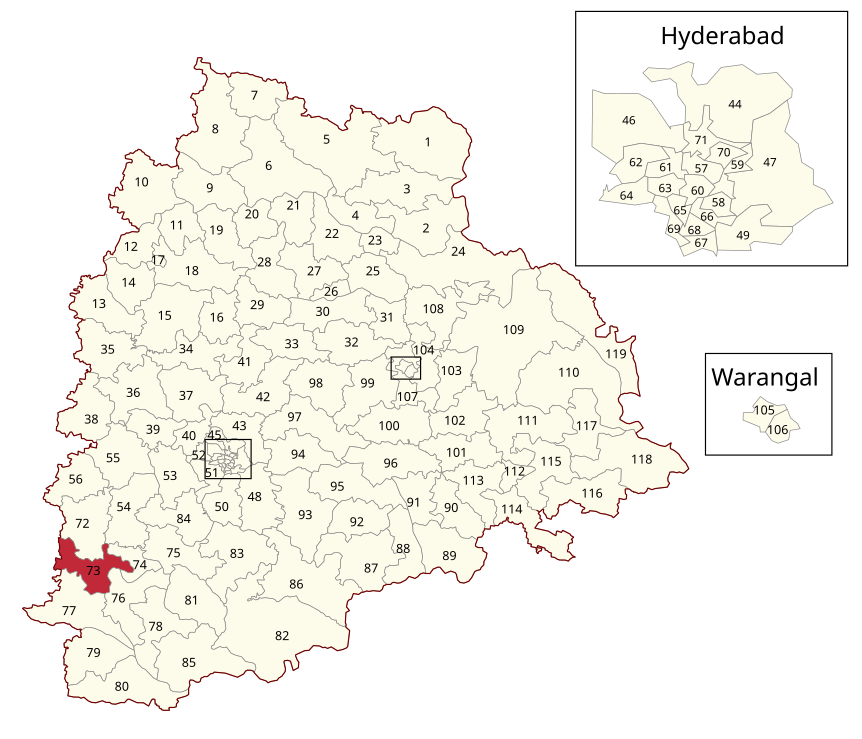
- Location of Narayanpet Assembly constituency within Telangana

Constituency details
- Country: India
- Region: South India
- State: Telangana
- District: Mahabubnagar
- Lok Sabha constituency: Mahabubnagar
- Established: 2008
- Total electors: 1,95,740
- Reservation: None

Member of Legislative Assembly
- 3rd Telangana Legislative Assembly
- Incumbent Chittem Parnika Reddy
- Party: Indian National Congress
- Elected year: 2023

Narayanpet Assembly constituency is a constituency of the Telangana Legislative Assembly, in India. It is in Mahabubnagar district and is a part of Mahabubnagar Lok Sabha constituency.

As of 2023, the constituency is represented by Chittem Parnika Reddy of the Indian National Congress party.

== Mandals ==
The Assembly Constituency presently comprises the following Mandals:

Mandal	Districts
Narayanpet	Narayanpet
Koilkonda	Mahabubnagar
Damaragidda	Narayanpet
Dhanwada	Narayanpet

== Members of the Legislative Assembly ==
Election	Member	Party
Andhra Pradesh
2009	Yelkoti Yella Reddy	Telugu Desam Party
Telangana
2014	S. Rajender Reddy	Telugu Desam Party
2018	S. Rajender Reddy	Telangana Rashtra Samithi
2023	Dr. Chittem Parnika Reddy	Indian National Congress

== Election results ==
=== 2023 ===
2023 Telangana Legislative Assembly election: Narayanpet
Party	Candidate	Votes	%	±%
INC	Dr. Chittem Parnika Reddy	84,708	46.31	
BRS	S. Rajender Reddy	76,757	41.97	
BJP	K. Ratanga Pandu Reddy	15,708	8.24	
BSP	Bodhigeli Srinivasulu	2,468	1.35	
NOTA	None of the Above	1,517	0.83	
Majority		7,951	4.34	
Turnout		1,82,899		
INC gain from BRS		Swing		

=== 2018 ===
2018 Telangana Legislative Assembly election: Narayanpet
Party	Candidate	Votes	%	±%
TRS	S. Rajender Reddy	68,767	42.51	
Bahujana Left Front	K. Shivakumar Reddy	53,580	33.12	
BJP	K. Rathanga Pandu Reddy	20,111	12.43	
INC	Krishna Saraf Bangaru Balappa	6,344	3.92	
NOTA	None of the Above	1,948	1.20	
Majority		15,187		
Turnout		1,61,754	79.67	
TRS gain from TDP		Swing		

== See also ==
- Mahabubnagar district
- List of constituencies of Telangana Legislative Assembly
