= Badepalle =

Badepalle Jadcherla
- Census Town
- Location in Telangana, India Badepalle (India)
- Coordinates: 16.754352°N 78.147892°E
- Country: India
- State: Telangana
- District: Mahbubnagar

Area
  - Total: 10.30 km^{2} (3.98 sq mi)

Population (2011)
  - Total: 32,598
  - Density: 3,165/km^{2} (8,197/sq mi)

Languages
  - Official: Telugu
- Time zone: UTC+5:30 (IST)
- Vehicle registration: TS

Badepalle is a census town in Mahbubnagar district of the Indian state of Telangana.

== Demographics ==
As of 2001 India census, Badepalle had a population of 29,822. Males constitute 51% of the population and females 49%. Badepalle has an average literacy rate of 67%, higher than the national average of 59.5%; with 57% of the males and 43% of females literate. About 13% of the population is under 6 years of age.

== Market, railway and nearest towns ==
Badepally or Badepalle has an agricultural market and it is connected to the nearest cities Mahbubnagar, Hyderabad and Shadnagar through railway. The area surrounding to Badepalle railway station is also known Station Jadcherla. Jadcherla and Badepally were separate till mid 1980s. Badepally town is merged with Jadcherla town along with the nearest villages like Kaverammapet (also known as Kaurampet).
