= Mahbubnagar Assembly constituency =

Constituency of the Telangana legislative assembly in India

Coordinates: 16.74°N 78.00°E

Mahbubnagar
- Constituency No. 74 for the Telangana Legislative Assembly
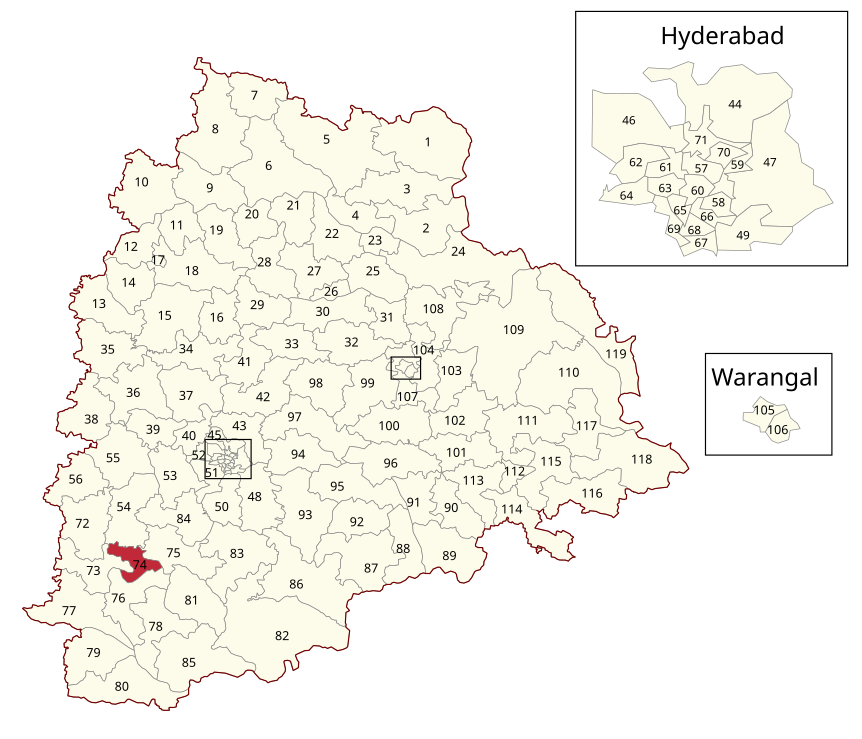
- Location of Mahbubnagar Assembly constituency within Telangana

Constituency details
- Country: India
- Region: South India
- State: Telangana
- District: Mahbubnagar
- Lok Sabha constituency: Mahabubnagar
- Established: 1951
- Total electors: 212,833
- Reservation: None

Member of Legislative Assembly
- 3rd Telangana Legislative Assembly
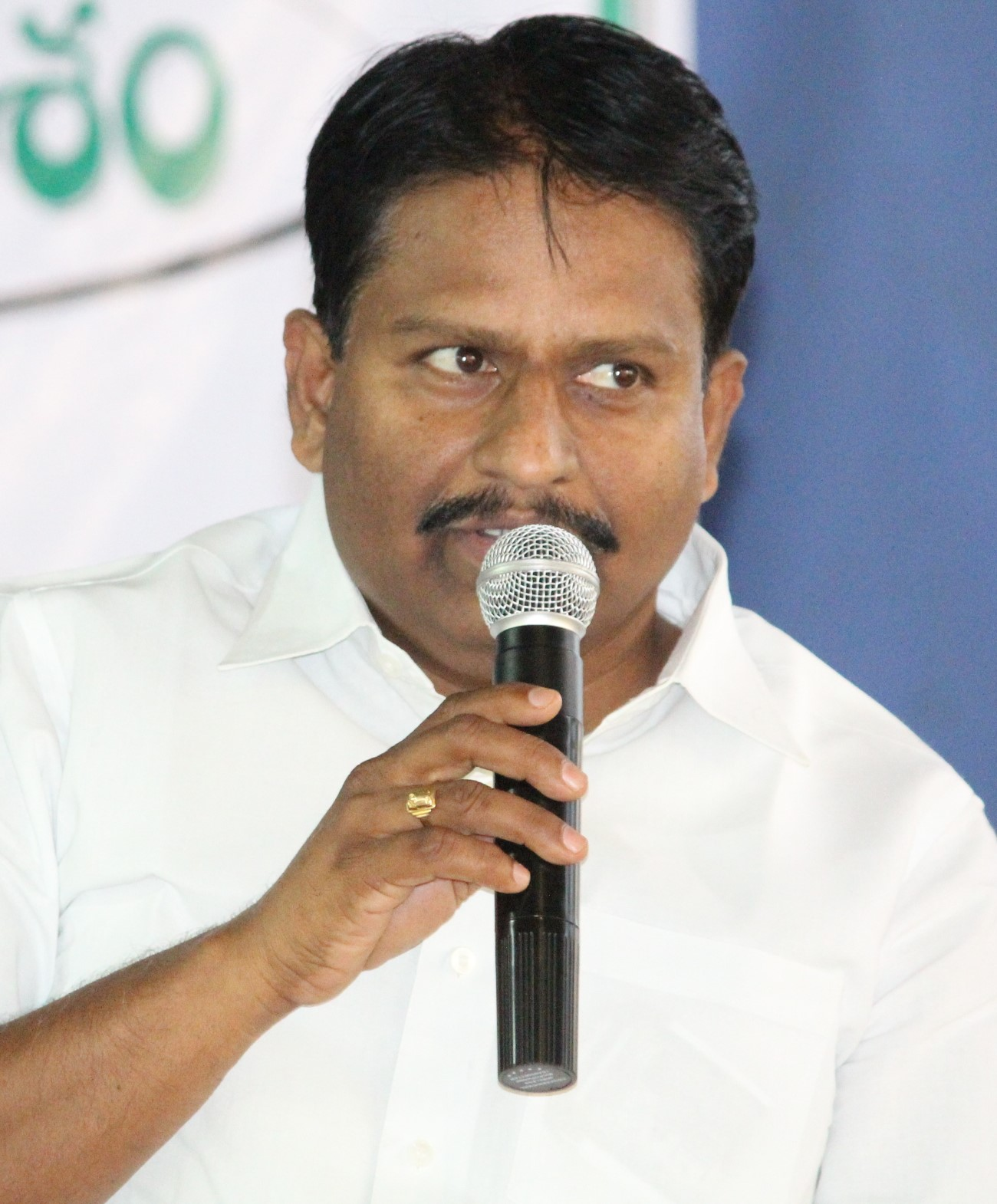
- Incumbent Yennam Srinivas Reddy
- Party: INC
- Elected year: 2023

Mahbubnagar Assembly constituency is a constituency of the Telangana Legislative Assembly, India. It is one of the constituencies in Mahbubnagar district and includes Mahabubnagar city. It is part of Mahabubnagar Lok Sabha constituency.

Yennam Srinivas Reddy is currently representing the constituency.

== Mandals ==
The assembly constituency presently comprises the following mandals:

Mandal
Mahbubnagar Urban
Hanwada
Yenugonda

== Members of Legislative Assembly ==
Year of election	MLA	Political party
Hyderabad State
1952	P. Hanumantha Rao	Indian National Congress
Andhra Pradesh
1957	Eguru Chinnappa	Praja Party
1962	M. Ram Reddy	Independent
1967	Ansari Ibrahim Ali	Indian National Congress
1972	Ansari Ibrahim Ali	Indian National Congress
1978	M. Ram Reddy	Indian National Congress
1980	Anjaneyulu	Indian National Congress
1983	P. Chandra Shekar	Telugu Desam Party
1985	P. Chandra Shekar	Telugu Desam Party
1989	Puli Veeranna	Indian National Congress
1994	P. Chandra Shekar	Telugu Desam Party
1999	P. Chandra Shekar	Telugu Desam Party
2004	Puli Veeranna	Independent
2009	N. Rajeshwar Reddy	Independent
2012	Yennam Srinivas Reddy	Bharatiya Janata Party
Telangana
2014	V. Srinivas Goud	Telangana Rashtra Samithi
2018	V. Srinivas Goud	Telangana Rashtra Samithi
2023	Yennam Srinivas Reddy	Indian National Congress

== Election results ==
=== Telangana Legislative Assembly election, 2023 ===
Telangana Assembly Elections, 2023: Mahbubnagar (Assembly constituency)
Party	Candidate	Votes	%	±%
INC	Yennam Srinivas Reddy	87,227	48.04	+48.04%
BRS	V. Srinivas Goud	68,489	37.72	
BJP	A. P. Mithun Kumar Reddy	20,919	10.97	
BSP	P. Swapna	1,317	0.73	
Independent	Karukonda Srinivasulu	1,174	0.65	
NOTA	None of the Above	1,157	0.64	
Majority		18,738	10.32	
Turnout		1,81,572		
INC gain from BRS		Swing		

=== Telangana Legislative Assembly election, 2018 ===
Telangana Assembly Elections, 2018: Mahbubnagar (Assembly constituency)
Party	Candidate	Votes	%	±%
TRS	V. Srinivas Goud	86,474	54.16	
TDP	M. Chandra Shekar	28,699	17.97	
BSP	Ibrahim Syed	21,664	13.57	
NCP	Marepally Surender Reddy	11,633	7.29	
BJP	G. Padmaja Reddy	5,945	3.72	
NOTA	None of the Above	1,423	0.89	
Majority		57,775	36.19	
Turnout		1,59,661	74.93	
TRS hold		Swing		

=== Telangana Legislative Assembly election, 2014 ===
Telangana Assembly Elections, 2014: Mahbubnagar (Assembly constituency)
Party	Candidate	Votes	%	±%
TRS	V. Srinivas Goud	45,447	30.67	
BJP	Yennam Srinivas Reddy	42,308	28.55	
Independent	Ibrahim Syed	27,395	18.49	
INC	Md. Obedulla Kothwal	22,744	15.35	
Independent	Dr. C. Amarendernath	4,666	3.15	
Independent	Gonela Mahender Mudiraj	1,399	0.94	
YSRCP	Bekkari Srinivas Reddy	1,192	0.80	
BSP	Mangalagiri Yadagiri	998	0.67	
NOTA	None of the above	618	0.42	
Majority		3,139	2.12	
Turnout		1,48,17566	67.39	
TRS gain from BJP		Swing		

== See also ==
- List of constituencies of Telangana Legislative Assembly
