= Alla Venkateshwar Reddy =

Indian politician

Alla Venkateshwar Reddy (born 30 September 1968) is an Indian politician from Telangana state. He is a former member of the Telangana Legislative Assembly from Devarkadra Assembly constituency in Mahabubnagar district, representing the Telangana Rashtra Samithi.

== Early life ==
Reddy was born on 30 September 1968 to Raghupathi Reddy in Annasagar village, Boothpur mandal, Mahabubnagar district, Telangana state. He completed his B.Tech. in civil engineeringat Maratwada/Nanded University, Maharashtra in 1990. He declared assets worth Rs.79 crore in his affidavit to the Election Commission of India.

== Career ==
Reddy won the Devarkadra Assembly constituency representing Telangana Rashtra Samithi in the 2014 Andhra Pradesh Legislative Assembly election, which was held concurrently for both the Andhra Pradesh and Telangana legislatures after the bifurcation of the state. He polled 66,354 votes and defeated his nearest rival, Pavan Kumar of the Indian National Congress, by a margin of 16,922 votes. He retained the Devarkadra seat for the TRS in the 2018 Telangana Legislative Assembly election. He polled 96,130 votes and defeated his closest opponent, Pavan Kumar of the Congress by a margin of 35,248 votes. He lost the 2023 Telangana Legislative Assembly election to Gavinolla Madhusudan Reddy of the Indian National Congress by a margin of 1,392 votes.
