= Koukuntla =

- Location in Telangana, India Koukuntla (India)
- Coordinates: 16.523225°N 77.859565°E
- Country: India
- State: Telangana
- District: Mahabubnagar
- Time zone: UTC+5:30 (IST)
- PIN: 509219
- Vehicle registration: TS06
- Nearest city: Devarakadra
- Lok Sabha constituency: Mahabubnagar
- Vidhan Sabha constituency: Devarakadra
- Climate: hot (Köppen)
- Website: telangana.gov.in

Koukuntla is a village, panchayat and Mandal in Mahabub Nagar district, Telangana, India. 4442 Population as per 2011 Census.

Devarkadra is the Nearest Town to Koukuntla. Mahbubnagar is 34 km from Koukuntla. Rail Way connectivity also in Kaukuntla.
