= Chandraspalle =

Chandrapalle
- Village
- Location in Telangana, India Chandrapalle (India)
- Coordinates: 16°48′44″N 77°47′32″E
- Country: India
- State: Telangana
- Region: Deccan Plateau
- District: Mahabubnagar
- Taluka/constituency: Narayanpet

Government
  - Member of Parliament: D. K. Aruna
  - MLA: Chittem Parnika Reddy
  - Sarpanch: Kavali Gopal
  - [ Upa Sarpanch]: Shasani Raghupathi Reddy

Area
  - Total: 5 km^{2} (1.9 sq mi)
- Elevation: 409 m (1,342 ft)

Population
  - Total: 2,050
  - Density: 410/km^{2} (1,100/sq mi)

Languages
  - Official: Telugu
- Time zone: UTC+5:30 (IST)
- Pincode: 509371.
- Area code: +91, 08542
- Vehicle registration: TS 06
- Literacy: 75%
- Assembly Constituency: Narayanpet
- Vidhan Sabha Constituency: Mahabubnagar Rural
- Avg. Annual Temperature: 31 °C (88 °F)
- Avg. Summer Temperature: 40 °C (104 °F)
- Avg. Winter Temperature: 20 °C (68 °F)

Chandraspalle is a small village in Koilkonda Mandal, Narayanpet constituency, Mahbubnagar district, Telangana in southern India. It is located 26 kilometres towards west from the district headquarters in Mahbubnagar, and is five kilometres from Mandal Koilkonda and 125 kilometres from Hyderabad.

Chandraspalle's pin code is 509371 and postal head office is in Koilkonda. Jamalpur (5 km), Seri Venkatapur (6 km), Ayodhya Nagar (6 km), Kistampally (6 km), Modipur (7 km) are nearby villages. Chandraspalle is surrounded by Gandeed Mandal towards North, Hanwada Mandal towards East, Maddur Mandal towards west, Kosgi Mandal towards North.

Chandraspalle is close to the cities and towns of Mahbubnagar, Narayanpet, Badepally, and Farooqnagar.

It has a population of more than 2050. It is a religiously diversified small village with Hindu temples. This village is famous for temples of Lord Ananthaswamy, Hanuman, Saraswati and Pochamma. Every year, the Sree Anantha Swamy Jatara is held for the Ugadi festival, Sree Rama Kalyanotsavam is held in the village for Sri Rama Navami in April and special pujas and bhajans for Lord Hanuman on the day of Hanuman Jayanti, which are all organised by the Sri Maruthi Yuvajana Sangam (SMYS). It was started in 2017. Ugadi, Sankranthi, Dussehra, Diwali and Bonalu, are the major festivals celebrated in this village.

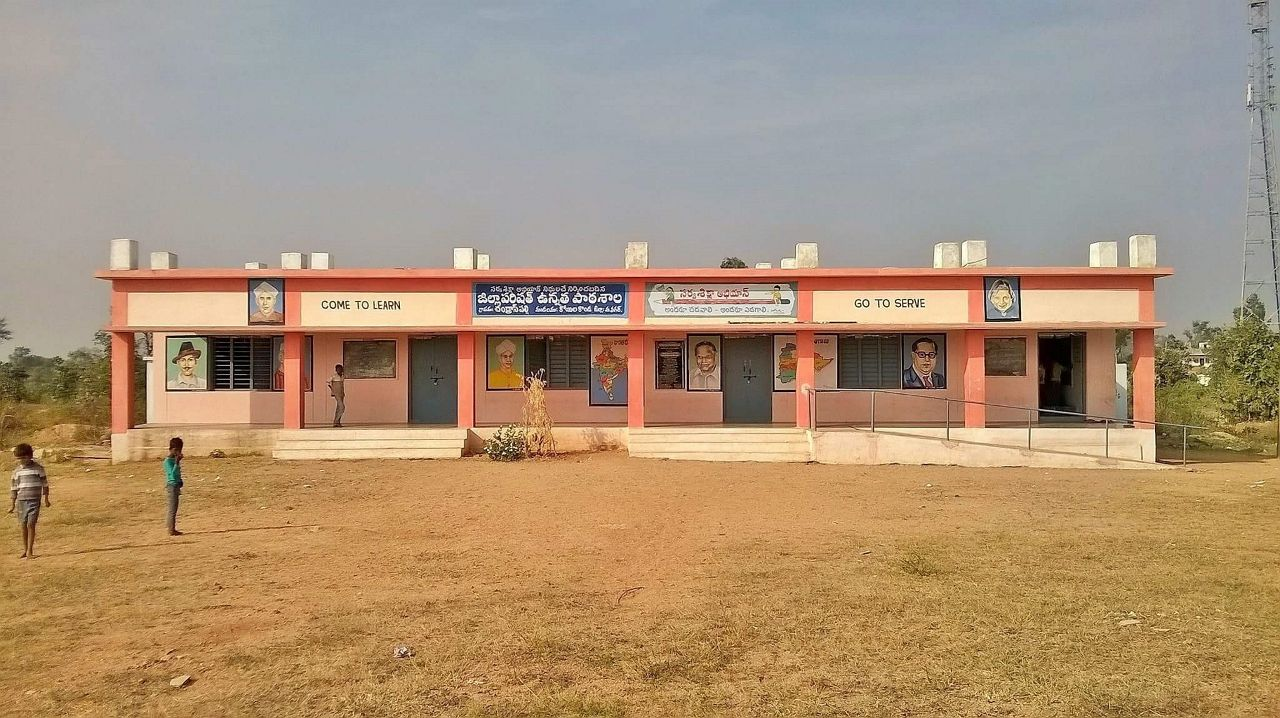
ZP High School, Chandraspalle
