= Dindi River =

River in India

Krishna River
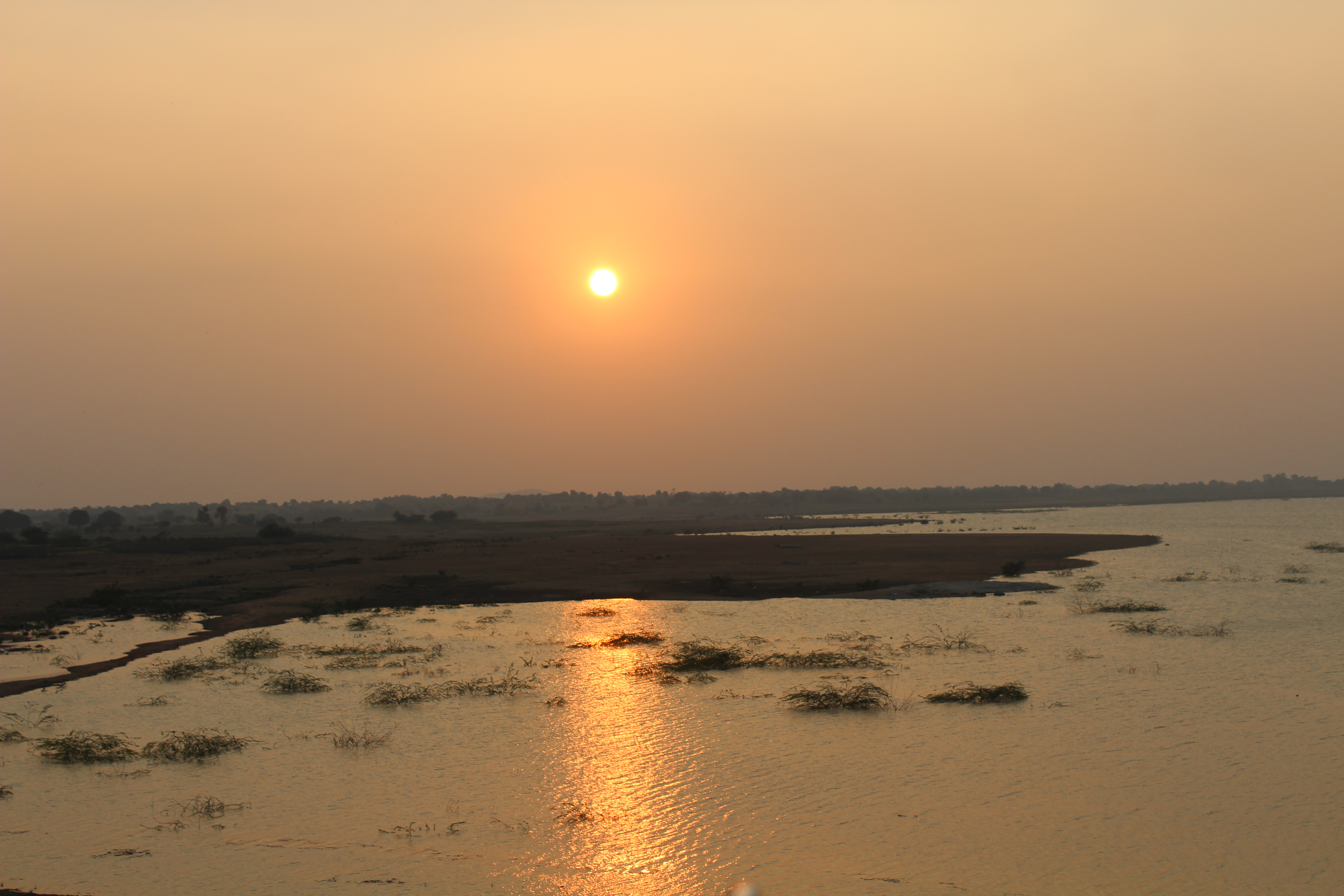
- Sunset at the Dindi Reservoir in Telangana, India

Location
- Country: India
- State: Telangana
- Region: South India

Physical characteristics
- Source: Ranga Reddy District
  - location: Telangana, India
  - coordinates: 17°03′22″N 77°59′25″E
  - elevation: 655 m (2,149 ft)
- Mouth: Krishna River
  - location: Nagarjuna Sagar backwaters, Nalgonda district, Telangana, India
  - coordinates: 16°21′35″N 17°12′22″E
  - elevation: 172 m (564 ft)
- Length: 200 km (120 mi)

The Dindi (Telugu: డిండి/దుందుభి) is a river in Telangana, India. It is a left-bank tributary of the Krishna River, serving as a vital water source for irrigation and drinking purposes in Mahabubnagar and Nalgonda districts. It is more commonly known as the Dundubhi River in upstream areas such as Udithyal and Balanagar.

== Course ==
The Dindi River originates in the Maheshwaram Range of the Ranga Reddy district. From its source, the river flows in a southeasterly direction and empties into the Krishna River at the backwaters of the Nagarjuna Sagar. The river's flow often experiences a significant surge during the rainy monsoon season and recedes to a narrow stream during the peak summer months.

== Major Dams ==
=== Dindi Reservoir ===
The most prominent structure on the river is the Dindi Reservoir (officially known as the R. Vidyasagar Rao Dindi Lift Irrigation Project), located near the village of Dindi in Nalgonda district. The reservoir is primarily used for irrigation and provides drinking water to nearby villages. It has a capacity of 59 million cubic meters.

=== SLBC Nakkalagandi Reservoir Project ===
The SLBC Nakkalagandi Reservoir, commonly referred to as the Dindi Balancing Reservoir, serves as a critical storage facility designed to receive water from the Srisailam Reservoir via a 43.5km underground tunnel. It is a key component of the Alimineti Madhava Reddy Project, engineering to provide sustainable drinking water and irrigation to the drought-prone and fluoride-affected regions of the Nalgonda district.

The river also has numerous smaller check dams along its course.

== Bridges ==
The Dindi River is spanned by several bridges along its course, some of which are listed below.

- Dundubhi Bridge at Balanagar, along National Highway 44
- Potlapally Bridge
- Edganpalle Bridge
- Alwanpally Bridge, along National Highway 167
- Medipur Bridge, along National Highway 167-K
- Molgara Bridge
- Chinthapally Bridge
