= S. Rajender Reddy =

Indian politician

S. Rajender Reddy (born 5 June 1964) is an Indian politician from Telangana state. He is a former two time member of the Telangana Legislative Assembly from Narayanpet Assembly constituency in Mahabubnagar district, representing the Telangana Rashtra Samithi in 2018, and the Telugu Desam Party in 2014.

== Early life ==
Reddy was born on 5 June 1964 in Seri Venkatapur village, Koilkonda mandal, Mahabubnagar district, Telangana state to the late S. Rajeshwar Reddy and Yashodhara Reddy. He married Swathi Reddy in 1994. He did his Masters in pharmacy in 1996 after completing his B.Pharma. in 1986 at AMEs VlCP College, Raichur, which is affiliated with the Gulbarga University.

== Career ==
Reddy won the Narayanpet Assembly constituency representing the Telugu Desam Party in the 2014 Andhra Pradesh Legislative Assembly election, which was held concurrently for both the Andhra Pradesh and Telangana legislatures after the bifurcation of the state. He polled 40,107 votes and defeated his nearest rival, K. Shivakumar Reddy of the Telangana Rashtra Samithi, by a margin of 2,270 votes. He later joined the TRS and won the 2018 election on TRS ticket. In 2018, he garnered 68,767 votes and defeated his closest opponent, K. Shivakumar Reddy of the Bahujana Left Front, by a margin of 15,187 votes. He lost the 2023 Telangana Legislative Assembly election to Parnika Chittem Reddy, of the Indian National Congress, by a margin of 7,951 votes.
