= List of female members of the Telangana Legislative Assembly =

This is a list of women who have been elected as members of the legislative assembly (MLAs) to the Telangana Legislative Assembly.

== List ==
Party	Portrait	Name	Constituency	Year elected	Year left	Reason
TRS		Kova Laxmi	Asifabad	2014 & 2023		Defeated & serving
TRS		Ajmeera Rekha	Khanapur	2014	2023	Retired
TRS		Bodige Shobha	Choppadandi	2014	2018	Defeated
TRS		Padma Devender Reddy	Medak	2014	2023	Defeated
INC		J. Geeta Reddy	Zahirabad	2014	2018	Defeated
INC		D. K. Aruna	Gadwal	2014	2018	Defeated
INC		N. Padmavathi Reddy	Kodad	2014 & 2023		Defeated & serving
TRS		Gongidi Suntiha	Alair	2014	2023	Defeated
TRS		Konda Surekha	Warangal East	2014 & 2023		Retired & serving
TRS (Note: elected from INC ticket.)		Sabitha Indra Reddy	Maheshwaram	2018		Serving
INC		Dansari Anasuya	Mulug	2018		Serving
TRS (Note: elected from INC ticket.)		Haripriya Banoth	Yellandu	2018	2023	Defeated
BRS		Vakiti Sunitha Laxma Reddy	Narsapur	2023		Serving
BRS		G. Lasya Nanditha	Secunderabad Cantonment	2023	2024	Died
INC		Chittem Parnika Reddy	Narayanpet	2023		Serving
INC		Mamidala Yashaswini Reddy	Palakurthi	2023		Serving
INC		Matta Ragamayee	Sathupalli	2023		Serving
