= Janampalli =

Janampalli (Telugu: జనంపల్లి) is a Telugu surname. Variants of the surname include Janampally and Janumpally. Notable people with the surname include:

- Janampalli Anirudh Reddy (born 1980), Indian politician
- Janumpally Rameshwar Rao (1923–1998), Indian politician
