= Yenmanagandla =

- Village
- Country: India
- State: Telangana
- District: Mahbubnagar
- Subdistrict: Nawabpet
- Elevation: 541 m (1,775 ft)

Languages
  - Official: Telugu and Hindi, Urdu
- Time zone: UTC+05:30 (IST)
- Telephone code: 08542

Yenmanagandla is a village and Gram panchayat in Nawabpet Mandal in Mahbubnagar District of the Indian state of Telangana.

== Demographics ==
The population is 6,917 people, number of houses are 1508. Female population is 51.0%. Village literacy rate is 54.9% and the female literacy rate is 23.4%. Colleges in Yenmangandla: Government Junior College.

Schools in Yenmanagandla: Zphs Yemmanagandla Address, Government Primary School

The local population mostly speaks Telugu (the third most spoken language in India excluding English) and Urdu (the second most spoken language in Telangana state), .
