= Mudumal =

- Country: India
- State: Telangana
- District: Narayanpet

Population (2011)
  - Total: 2,890

Mudumal is a village located in the Narayanpet district of the Indian state of Telangana. It is located on the banks of the Krishna river.

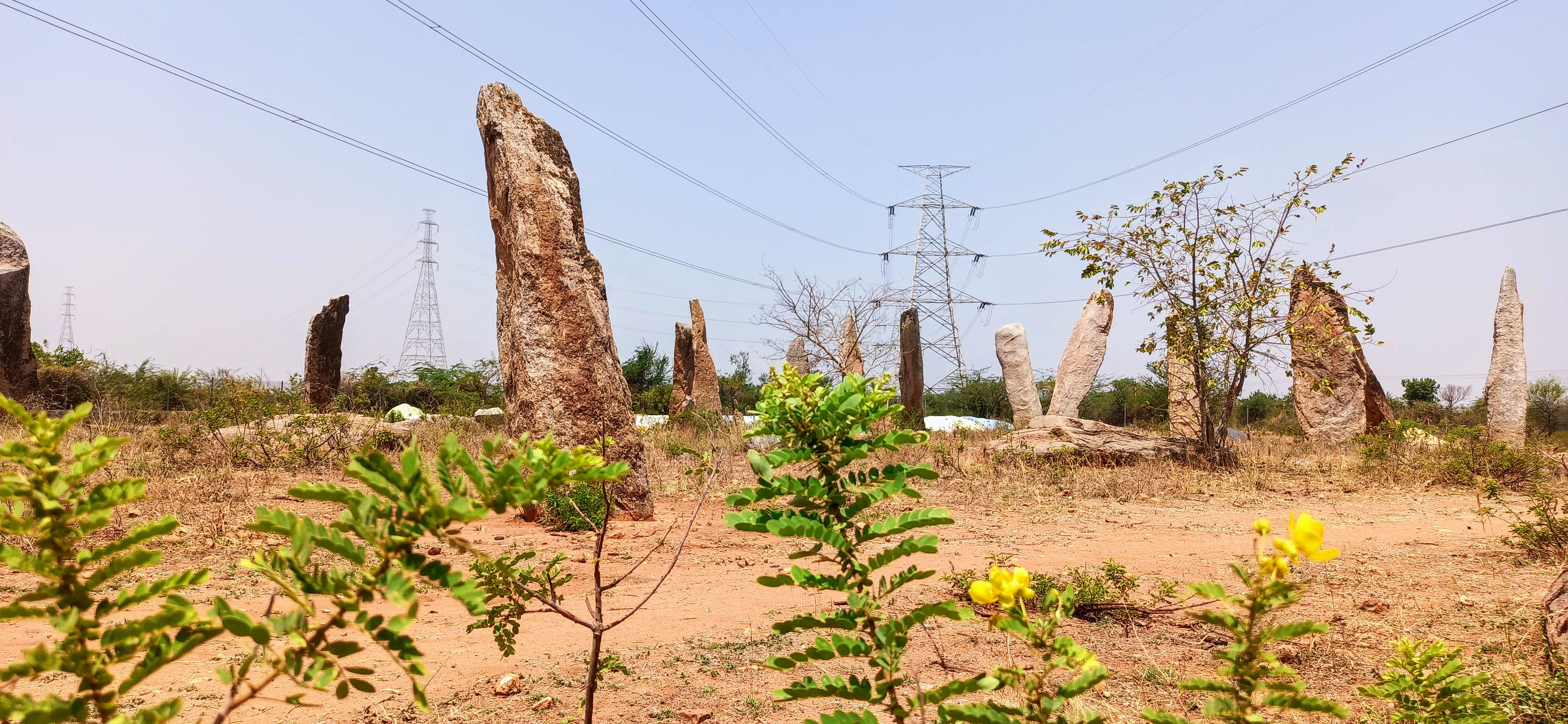
Mudumal Megalithic Menhris enter UNESCO's Tentative Heritage List

== Landmarks ==
A group of prehistoric menhirs are located toward the southwest of the village.

== Demographics ==
According to the 2011 census, the village had a population of 2890, in 537 households.
