= Yennam Srinivas Reddy =

Indian politician (born 1970)

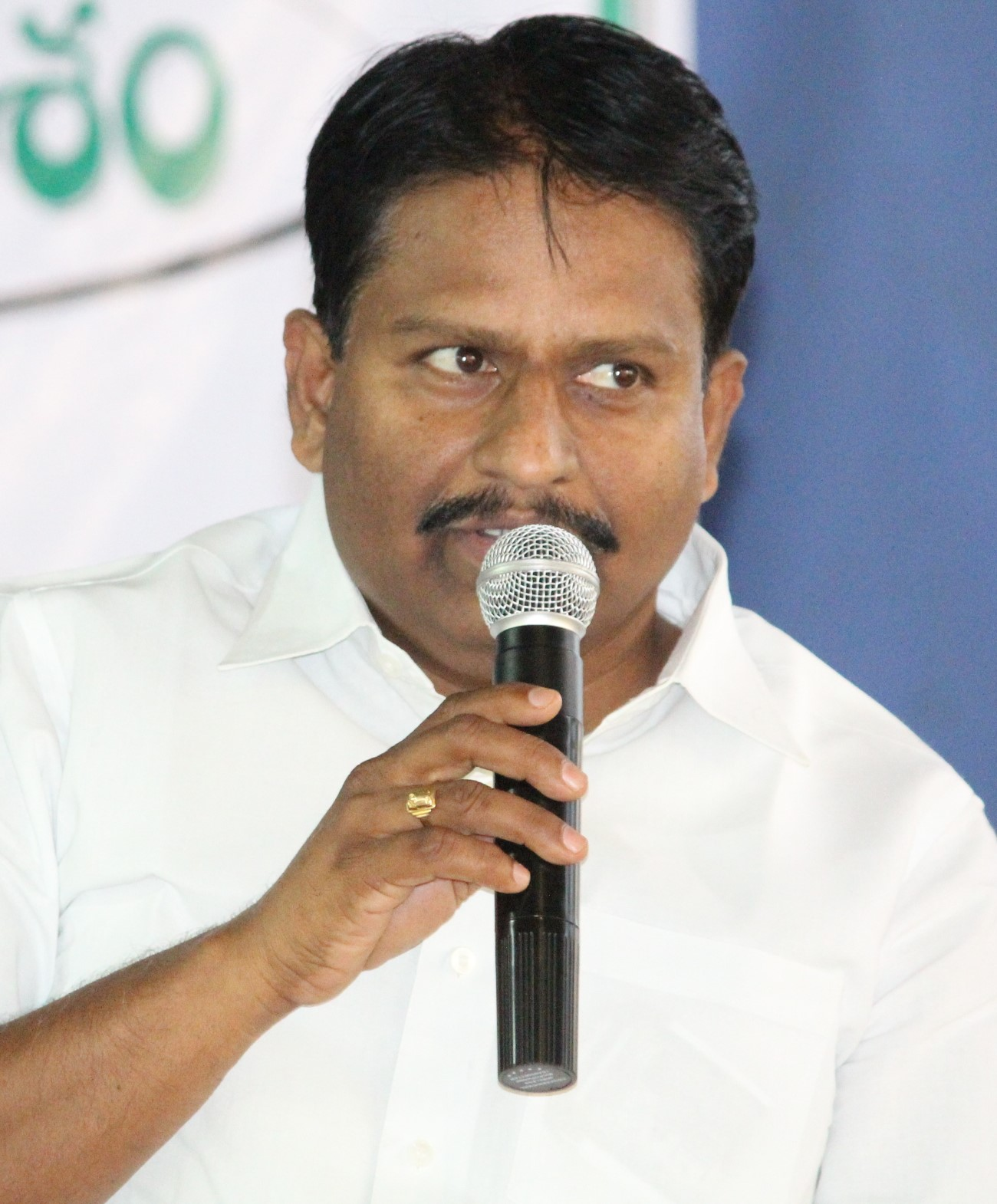

Yennam Srinivas Reddy (born 1970) is an Indian politician from Telangana state who is a member of the Telangana Legislative Assembly from Mahabubnagar Assembly constituency in Mahabubnagar district. He represents Indian National Congress and won the 2023 Telangana Legislative Assembly election.

== Early life and education ==
Reddy is from Mahbubnagar, Mahabubnagar district. His father's name is Yennam Janaki Ram Reddy. He completed his post graduation in Arts in 1994 at Osmania University.

== Career ==
Reddy won as an MLA for the second time from Mahbubnagar Assembly constituency, this time representing Indian National Congress in the 2023 Telangana Legislative Assembly election. He polled 87,227 votes and defeated his nearest rival, V. Srinivas Goud of Bharat Rashtra Samithi, by a margin of 18,738 votes. Earlier in the 2012 Andhra Pradesh by-elections he won the Mahbubnagar seat on Bharatiya Janata Party ticket defeating Syed Ibrahim of BRS by a narrow margin of 1,897 votes.

Srinivas Reddy won the 2023 Telangana Legislative Assembly election and later he was Appointed as Govt Whip on 19 March 2026.
