= Annasagar, Damaragidda =

Village in Mahabubnagar district, Telangana, India

Annasagar is a village in Damaragidda mandal, Mahabubnagar district, Telangana, India. As of the 2011 Census of India, it had a population of 1,869 across 349 households. There were 932 males and 937 females. 276 were 6 years old or under. 572 were literate.
