= Pedha Thandrapadu =

Coordinates: 15°55′37.6″N 77°38′08.7″E

Pedha Thandrapadu is a very small village which is located in Mahaboobnagar District in the Indian state of Telangana.
