= Putpak =

- village
- Location within Karnataka Location within India
- Coordinates: 16°48′41″N 077°27′15″E
- Country: India
- State: Karnataka
- District: Yadgir district
- Taluka: Yadgir

Government
  - Type: Panchayat raj
  - Body: Gram panchayat

Population (2001)
  - Total: 3,268

Languages
  - Official: Kannada
- Time zone: UTC+5:30 (IST)
- PIN: 585214
- ISO 3166 code: IN-KA
- Vehicle registration: KA
- Website: karnataka.gov.in

Putpak is a panchayat village in the southern state of Karnataka, India. Administratively, Putpak is under Yadgir Taluka of Yadgir District in Karnataka. The village of Putpak is on the eastern edge of Yadgir District and Karnataka and is only 6 km by road west of the village of Damaragidda in Telangana. It is 10.5 km by road southeast of the town of Gurmatkal. The nearest railhead is in Yadgir.

There are four villages in the gram panchayat: Putpak, Dantapur, Jawaharnagar, and Mallapur.

== Demographics ==
As of 2001 census, the village of Putpak had 3,268 inhabitants, with 1,567 males and 1,701 females.
