= Nawabpet =

Nawabpet may refer to:

- Nawabpet, Mahbubnagar district, Telangana, India
- Nawabpet, Vikarabad district, Telangana, India
