= Kondanagula =

Coordinates: 16°20′4.37″N 78°35′55.42″E

Kondanagula is a village in Mahbubnagar district, India.
