= Sanganoni Pally =

Sanganoni pally
- village
- Country: India
- State: Telangana
- District: Mahbubnagar district

Languages
  - Official: Telugu
- Time zone: UTC+5:30 (IST)
- Vehicle registration: TS
- Website: telangana.gov.in

Sanganoni pally, also Sanganonipally, Sanginonipally, Sanginenipally and variants, is a small village located in Koilkonda gram panchayat, Mahbubnagar district, Telangana, India. The population of the village in 2019 was 764.
