= Balanagar =

Balanagar or may refer to:

- Balanagar, Mahbubnagar district, a village in Telangana, India
- Balanagar, Medchal district, a suburb in Hyderabad, Medchal district, Telangana, India
- Balanagar mandal in Ranga Reddy district, Telangana, India
- A cultivar of custard apple, Annona squamosa
