= M. Ram Reddy =

M. Ram Reddy (d. 1979) was an Indian socialist politician. He was a Member of Legislative Assembly of Hyderabad State 1953-1957, and of Andhra Pradesh 1962-1967 and 1978-1979.

== Biography ==
In the period after the independence of India, M. Ram Reddy was a prominent leader of the Socialist Party in Hyderabad State. M. Ram Reddy contested the Mahbubnagar Lok Sabha seat in the 1952 Indian general election as a Socialist Party candidate, finishing in second place with 102,131 votes (29.67%).

He also contested the Shadnagar seat in the 1952 Hyderabad Legislative Assembly election, standing as a Socialist Party candidate. He finished in third place with 6,527 votes (22.31%).

M. Ram Reddy was elected to the Hyderabad Legislative Assembly from the Wanaparthy constituency in a December 1953 by-election (held after the death of Suravaram Pratapa Reddy). He stood as a Praja Socialist Party candidate. M. Ram Reddy obtained 9,089 votes, against 7,425 votes for Indian National Congress candidate Jai Ram and 1,133 votes for independent candidate Desarathaiya.

He contested the Mahbubnagar assembly seat in the 1957 Andhra Pradesh Legislative Assembly election, finishing in second place with 7,217 votes (32.63%). He won the Mahbubnagar seat in the subsequent 1962 Andhra Pradesh Legislative Assembly election, now standing as an independent and obtaining 15,282 votes (54.34%).

M. Ram Reddy was re-elected from the Mahbubnagar seat in the Andhra Pradesh Legislative Assembly in the 1978 election, now standing as an Indian National Congress (I) candidate. He obtained 23,861 votes (49.69%). M. Ram Reddy died on August 20, 1979. A by-election for the Mahbubnagar seat was held in 1980.
