= Narva mandal =

Narva
- Mandal
- Country: India
- State: Telangana
- District: Narayanpet
- Founder: Hanmi Reddy

Languages
  - Official: Telugu
- Time zone: UTC+5:30 (IST)
- PIN: 509130
- Telephone code: 08504.....
- Vehicle registration: TG 38
- Nearest city: Makthal
- Lok Sabha constituency: Mahaboob Nagar
- Vidhan Sabha constituency: Makthal
- Climate: hot (Köppen)

Narva is a Mandal in Narayanpet district, Telangana.

== Villages ==
The villages in Narwa mandal include:

- Bekkarapalle
- Chandragad
- Eklaspur
- Eerladinne
- Jakkannapalle
- Jangamreddipalle
- Kalwal
- Kanmanoor
- Kothapalli
- Kumarlingampally
- Lankal
- Mittanandimalla
- Nagalkadumur
- Narwa
- Patherched
- Peddakadmoor
- Raikode
- Rampur
- Seepur
- Undekode
- Yamki
