= Gaddampally =

Village in Telangana, India

Gaddampally is a village in Nagar kurnool district of Telangana State. It is located 10.5 km from Nagar Kurnool and 120 km from Hyderabad, India. It is around 10.5 km from the District headquarters Nagar Kurnool. The village pincode is 509385.
