= Janampalli Anirudh Reddy =

Indian politician (born 1980)

Janampalli Anirudh Reddy (born 31 December 1980) is an Indian politician from Telangana state. He is an MLA from Jadcherla Assembly constituency in Mahabubnagar district. He represents Indian National Congress and won the 2023 Telangana Legislative Assembly election.

== Early life and education ==
Reddy is from Rangareddyguda village, Jadcherla. He is born to Janampally Dilip Reddy and Shashikala. He completed his B. Tech. in computer science and engineering at Noor College of Engineering which is affiliated with Jawaharlal Nehru Technological University, Hyderabad in 2002.

== Career ==
Reddy began his political journey in 2012 joining the YSR Congress Party. In 2018, he shifted to the Indian National Congress (INC). In 2023, he was nominated to contest the Jadcherla seat on Congress ticket. He was elected in the Jadcherla Assembly constituency in the 2023 Telangana Legislative Assembly election. He polled 90,865 votes and defeated his nearest rival, Charlakola Laxma Reddy of Bharat Rashtra Samithi, by a huge margin of 15,171 votes.

In January 2024, he denied police protection and requested the Superintendent of Police not to depute police personnel for his personal security due to the shortage of police staff.
