= Gandeed =

- Mandal
- Location in Telangana, India Gandeed (India)
- Coordinates: 16°55′25″N 77°48′19″E
- Country: India
- State: Telangana
- District: Mahabubnagar
- Talukas: Parigi

Population (2007)
  - Total: 61,683

Languages
  - Official: Telugu
- Time zone: UTC+5:30 (IST)
- PIN: 509337
- Vehicle registration: TS
- Website: telangana.gov.in
- mandal president in gandeed = K. Madhavi rajkumar Reddy

Gandeed is a Mandal in Mahabubnagar district in the state of Telangana in India.

It further have many villages mainly Nancherla, Gadrial, Rusumpally, Mohammadabad (which is supposed to be declared as an independent new mandal very soon)

== Geography ==
The name of the village was originally Gandi veedu. But, in the long run, it changed to Gandeed.

This area is very much required its development by the Govt. of A.P in terms of every aspect, because it exists border to Karnataka and ignored by the leaders & the Govt., Because of the people's innocence as they never raises their voice on developmental activities against Govt./Leaders. - S.Baswaraj, Gandeed

The following is the list of village panchayats in Gandeed mandal.

1. Rususmpally
2. Jangum-
3. Reddypally
4. Gandeed
5. Komreddypally
6. Mansurpally
7. Pagidyal
8. Varahagiripally
9. Salkarpet
10. Baispally
11. Balsurgonda
12. Gadiryal
13. Lingaipally
14. Nancharla
15. Mangampet
16. Mokarlabad
17. Chowderpally
18. Mohammadabad
19. Annareddypally
20. Julapally
21. Sangaipally
22. Kaplapur
23. Vennached
24. Pedda warwal
25. Chinna warwal
26. Salarnagar
27. Chelmilla
28. Jinnaram
29. Venkatreddypally
30. Kanchanpally
