= C. Laxma Reddy =

Indian politician

Dr. C. Laxma Reddy
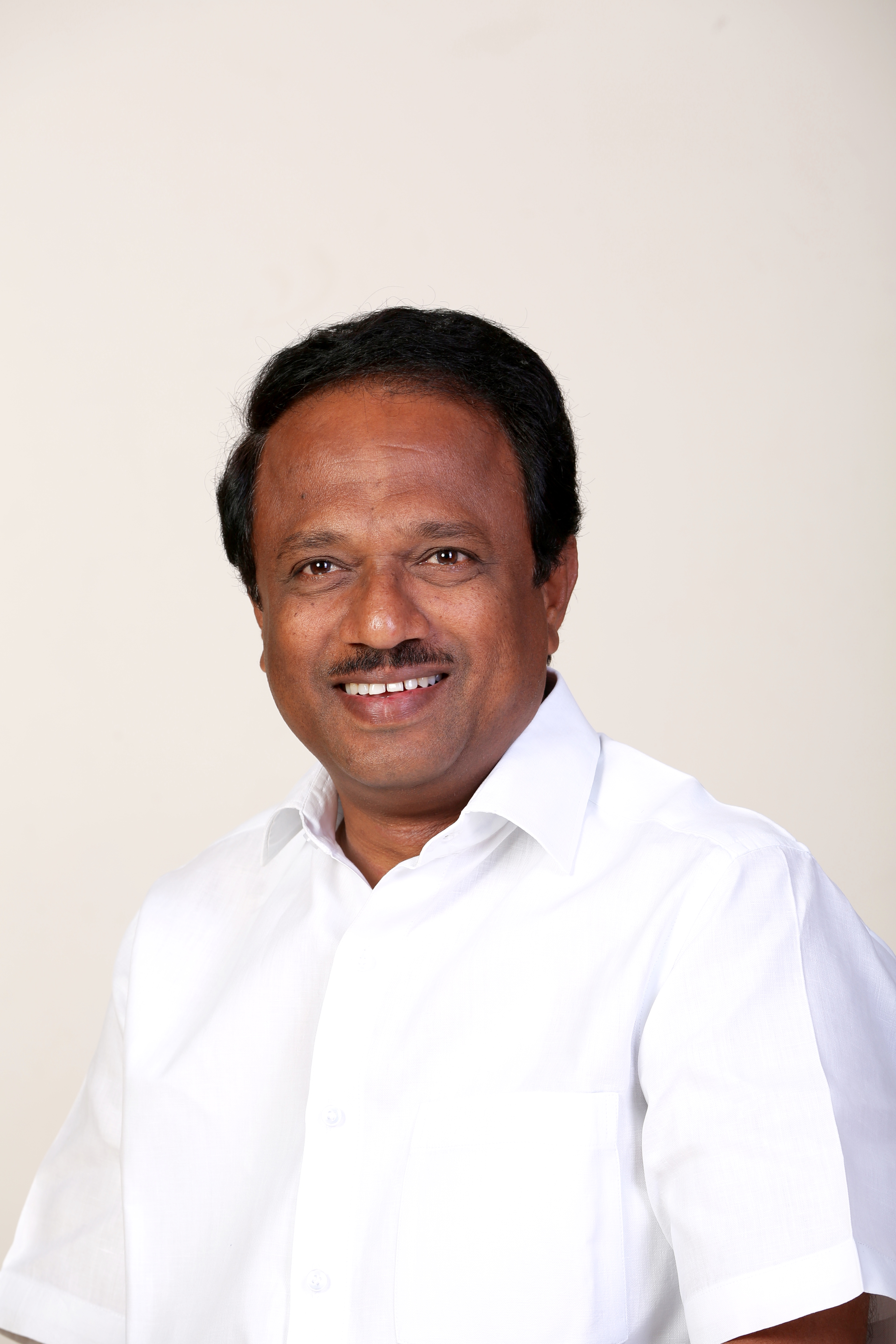

Minister of Health Medical Education & Family Welfare Government of Telangana
- In office 2 June 2014 – 8 September 2018
- Governor: E. S. L. Narasimhan
- Chief Minister: K. Chandrashekar Rao
- Preceded by: T. Rajaiah
- Succeeded by: Etela Rajender

Member of Legislative Assembly, Telangana
- In office 2 June 2014 – 7 December 2023
- Preceded by: Telangana Legislative Assembly
- Succeeded by: Anirudh Reddy
- Constituency: Jadcherla

Member of Legislative Assembly Andhra Pradesh
- In office 2004–2008
- Preceded by: M Chdhra Shekhar
- Succeeded by: Mallu Ravi
- Constituency: Jadcherla

Personal details
- Party: Bharat Rashtra Samithi
- Spouse: Dr. Sweta
- Education: B.H.M.S. (Homeopathic Medicine)
- Alma mater: Hyderabad Karnataka Education Society

Charlakola Laxma Reddy (born 3 February 1962) is the former Health Minister of Telangana, serving from 2014–2018. He is former Member of Legislative Assembly for Jadcherla constituency representing Bharat Rashtra Samithi. He served as the first Energy Minister for Telangana state and then was moved to take over the Health portfolio. He is also a former homeopathic doctor.

== Early life and education ==
Reddy was born in Jadcherla and hails from Avancha Village of Thimmajipet Mandal. He received his graduation in Bachelor of Homoeopathic Medical Sciences from Hyderabad Karnataka Education Society, Gulbarga, Karnataka. He was a Student Leader President. Later he practiced as a Homeopathic Doctor at Jadcherla before entering into politics.

== Political career ==
Laxma Reddy was very active in politics and held many posts from quite a young age. He started his political career as a sarpanch of his village, Avancha, in Thimmajipeta Mandal. Eventually, he did several services to Single Window System and Library Society at Thimmajipeta mandal level.

=== BRS Party ===
He joined Bharat Rashtra Samithi after K. Chandrashekhar Rao launched the party in 2001 and has been a key leader in the state movement. He won from the Jadcherla Constituency in 2004 Assembly Elections, but with KCR's call, Reddy was the first to resign his position in April 2008 when the Central government did not meet their demand for a separate state, but lost the by-elections.

=== As Minister ===
In 2014 Assembly elections, he was re-elected from Jadcherla and was inducted into Cabinet as Electricity Minister. After sacking of Deputy CM T. Rajaiah as Health Minister, Reddy replaced him and was handed over the Medical and Health Department.

== Personal life ==
He is married to Dr. Swetha and has two children, Spoorthi Reddy and Swaran Reddy.
