= Gavinolla Madhusudan Reddy =

Indian politician (born 1971)

Gavinolla Madhusudan Reddy (born 1971) is an Indian politician from Telangana state. He is an MLA from Devarkadra Assembly constituency in Mahabubnagar district. He represents Indian National Congress and won the 2023 Telangana Legislative Assembly election.

== Early life and education ==
Reddy is from Devarkadra, Mahabubnagar district. His father's name is Gavinolla Krishna Reddy. He is an advocate. After his graduation, he did his L.L.B. in 1998 at Padala Ram Reddy Law College, Hyderabad.

== Career ==
Reddy won from Devarkadra Assembly constituency representing Indian National Congress in the 2023 Telangana Legislative Assembly election. He polled 88,551 votes and defeated his nearest rival, Alla Venkateshwar Reddy of Bharat Rashtra Samithi, by a narrow margin of 1,392 votes.
