= Kapilavai Lingamurthy =

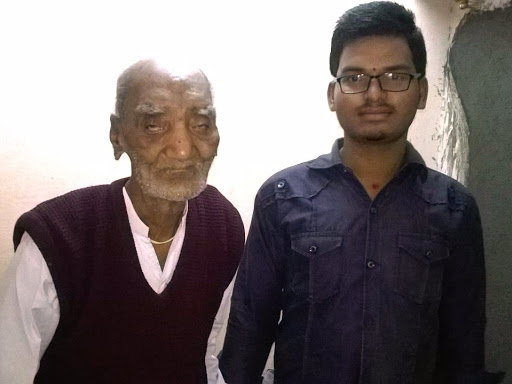
- Born: 31 March 1928; Jinkunta, Mahabubnagar, Hyderabad state (now Telangana), India]
- Died: 6 November 2018 (aged 90); Hyderabad, Telangana, India
- Occupations: Poet, writer
- Spouse: Meenakshammma
- Children: Kapilavai Kishore babu, Kapilavai Ashok babu
- Website: kapilavailingamurthy.com

Kapilavai Lingamurthy; 31 March 1928 – 6 November 2018) was an Indian Telugu poet and writer from Mahabubnagar District of Telangana.

== Early life ==
Kapilavai Lingamurthy was born on 31 March 1928 in Jinukunta, Mahabubnagar district of Telangana state (formerly Hyderabad state). His father Kapilavai Venkatachalam died when Lingamurthy was 3 years old. Following this, he moved to his maternal uncle's home. It was here he developed the interest in literature from his maternal uncle Chepooru Peddalakshmaiah from Amrabad near Achampet.

== Studies and career ==
Lingamurthy graduated from Osmania University-Hyderabad with a Master of Arts in Telugu literature. He was a teacher and lecturer by profession.

Lingamurthy joined as a teacher in Nagarkurnool national high school on 11 July 1954 and later trained in MOL (Master of Oriental Learning). He joined in Sri Venkateshwara Oriental College, Palem, as a history lecturer on 19 August 1972. He retired on 28 February 1983.

== Personal life and death ==
In 1944, he married Chinthapatla Meenakshamma, who was originally from Nagarkurnool.

Lingamurthy died in Hyderabad, Telangana on 6 November 2018, at the age of 90.

== Literature ==
Lingamurthy was a prominent writer and researcher in Telugu, and his services continued to be in demand three decades after his retirement.

Lingamurthy was well-versed in both Telugu poetry and prose. He wrote more than 100 books in the Telugu language. Among his books, the most popular are:

- Palamoor zilla Devalayalu (పాలమూరు జిల్లా దేవాలయాలు)
- Paamara Samskritam (పామర సంస్కృతం)
- Saalagramashastram (సాలగ్రామ శాస్త్రం)
- Aarya shatakam (ఆర్యా శతకం)
- Maangalya shastram (మాంగళ్య శాస్త్రం)
- Sri Mathprathapagiri khandam (శ్రీ మత్ప్రతాపగిరి ఖండం)
- Someshwara Kshetra Mahatyam and Charitra (సోమేశ్వరక్షేత్ర మహత్యం, చరిత్ర)
- Sundaree Sandeshamu (సుందరీ సందేశం)
- Padya kathaa Parimalamu (పద్యకథా పరిమళము)
- Sri Rudraadhyaayamu (శ్రీ రుద్రాధ్యాయము) written with D.Chandrashekar reddy

Lingamurthy wrote Umamaheshwara Kshetram, a history of the temple of Umamaheswaram, known as the northern gateway of a pilgrimage route to Srisailam.

== Awards ==
Lingamurthy received an honorary doctorate from Telugu University-Hyderabad in August 2014.

Six scholars conducted their doctoral research on Lingamurthy's body of work.

Kapilavai Lingamurthy created the following titles:

(translation in brackets)

- "Kavitha Kalanidhi" – 1992 – (Kavitha Kalanidhi)
- "Research Panachana" – 1992 - (Parishodhanaa Panchaanana)
- "కవి కేసరి" – 1996 – (Kavi Kesari)
- "వేదాంత విశారద" – 2005 – (Vedanta Vishaarada)
- "గురుశిరోమణి" – 2010 – (Guru Shiromani)
- "సాహిత్య స్వర్ణసౌరభ కేసరి" – 2012 – (Sahithya Swarnasourabha Kesari)

Apart from the titles mentioned above, he received the awards listed below:

- Pratibhaa Puraskaaram from Telugu University-Hyderabad
- Burgula Ramakrishna Rao Prathibha Puraskaaram
- Charles Phillip Brown Sahitya Puraskaaram
- Nori Narasimha Sastri Puraskaaram
- Kandukoori Rudrakavi Peetam Puraskaaram
- Paalkuri Somanatha Peetam Puraskaaram
- Palagummi Padmaraju Shata Jayanthi Puraskaaram
- TeNA Telangana Renaissance Awards, 2014, for Kaloji Narayana Rao Award (literature)
