= Annasagar, Nizamabad =

Village in Nizamabad district, Telangana, India

Annasagar is a village in Yellareddy mandal, Nizamabad district, Telangana, India. As of the 2011 Census of India, it had a population of 1,574 across 369 households. There were 753 males and 821 females. 178 were 6 years old or under. 710 were literate.
