= Annasagar, Ranga Reddy =

Village in Ranga Reddy district, Telangana, India

Annasagar is a village in Yelal mandal, Ranga Reddy district, Telangana, India. As of the 2011 Census of India, it had a population of 617 across 126 households. There were 321 males and 296 females. 71 were 6 years old or under. 314 were literate.
