= Midjil mandal =

Midjil
- Mandal
- Location in Telangana, India Midjil (India)
- Coordinates: 16.7000°N 78.9333°E
- Country: India
- State: Telangana
- District: Mahaboob Nagar

Area
  - Total: 28.18 km^{2} (10.88 sq mi)

Population (2011)
  - Total: 52,352
  - Density: 1,858/km^{2} (4,812/sq mi)

Languages
  - Official: Telugu
- Time zone: UTC+5:30 (IST)
- Postal code: 509357
- Vehicle registration: TS
- Website: telangana.gov.in

Midjil is a Mandal in Mahbubnagar district, Telangana.

== Institutions ==
- Zilla Parishad High school
- New sun rise school
- Government Junior College
- Slate Grammar School
- Chaitanya Bharati High School
- Sri venkateshwara vocational junior college
- St. Mary's E/M High School

== Villages ==
The villages in Midjil mandal include:

- Ayyawaripally
- Bhairampalle
- Boinpally
- Bommarasipalle
- Chiluveru/ Ranipet/ Reddyguda
- Donur
- Jakinalapalle
- Kanchanpalle
- Kothapalle
- Kothur
- Mallapoor
- Masigundlapally
- Midjil
- Munnanur
- Rachalpally
- Ramreddypally
- Revally
- Singamdoddi
- Valabaraopalle
- Vaspula
- Velgommula
- Vemula
- Wadyal
- Chennampally
