= Chinnachintakunta =

- village
- Interactive map of Chinnachintakunta
- Coordinates: 17°46′48″N 78°16′37″E
- Country: India
- State: Telangana
- District: Mahabubnagar

Area
  - Total: 6.53 km^{2} (2.52 sq mi)

Population (2011)
  - Total: 5,637
  - Density: 863/km^{2} (2,240/sq mi)

Languages
  - Official: Telugu
- Time zone: UTC+5:30 (IST)
- Vehicle registration: TS06
- Climate: hot (Köppen)
- Website: telangana.gov.in

Chinna Chintakunta is the Mandal headquarters which is part of Palamur (Mahbubnagar) district, Telangana.
