= Addakal mandal =

Coordinates: 16°30′N 77°56′E

Addakal
- mandal
- Interactive map of Addakal
- Country: India
- State: Telangana
- District: Mahabubnagar

Languages
  - Official: Telugu
- Time zone: UTC+5:30 (IST)
- Pin code: 509382
- Vehicle registration: TS06
- Climate: hot (Köppen)
- Website: telangana.gov.in

Addakal is a Mandal in Mahbubnagar district, Telangana. Historical Kandur Sri Ramalingaeshwara Swamy Temples is located at Kandur in Addakal Mandal.
