= V. Srinivas Goud =

Indian politician

- Goud in 2019

Minister of Prohibition & Excise, Sports & Youth services, Tourism & Culture and Archaeology Government of Telangana
- In office 19 Feb 2019 – 03 December 2023
- Chief Minister: K. Chandrasekhar Rao

Member of the Telangana Legislative Assembly
- In office 2014–2023
- Preceded by: Yennam Srinivas Reddy
- Succeeded by: Yennam Srinivas Reddy
- Constituency: Mahbubnagar

Personal details
- Born: 16 March 1969 (age 57) Hyderabad, Andhra Pradesh, India
- Party: Telangana Rashtra Samithi
- Spouse: Sharada
- Children: Srihitha, Sriharshita
- Parent(s): Narayana Goud, Shanthamma
- Education: B.Sc, PGDCJ, PGDWMM
- Occupation: Politician and activist

Virusanolla Srinivas Goud (born 16 March 1969) is an Indian politician served as the Minister of Prohibition & Excise, Sports & Youth services, Tourism & Culture and Archaeology of Telangana state. He represented Mahbubnagar constituency as an MLA in the Telangana Legislative Assembly from the Telangana Rashtra Samithi.

Goud started his career as a political activist. He is a former state government official who served as the Telangana Gazetted Officers’ (TGO) president. He also acted as the co-chairman of Telangana Political Joint Action Committee (TJAC) during the Telangana movement.

== Early life ==
V. Srinivas Goud was born on 16 March 1969 in Hyderabad of present-day Telangana to V. Narayan Goud and Shanthamma. He studied B.Sc., PGDCJ, PGDWMM and holds a post-graduate degree in journalism. After clearing the state civil services, Goud joined the Andhra Pradesh Government. He worked as a zonal commissioner in Greater Hyderabad Municipal Corporation before starting a career in politics.

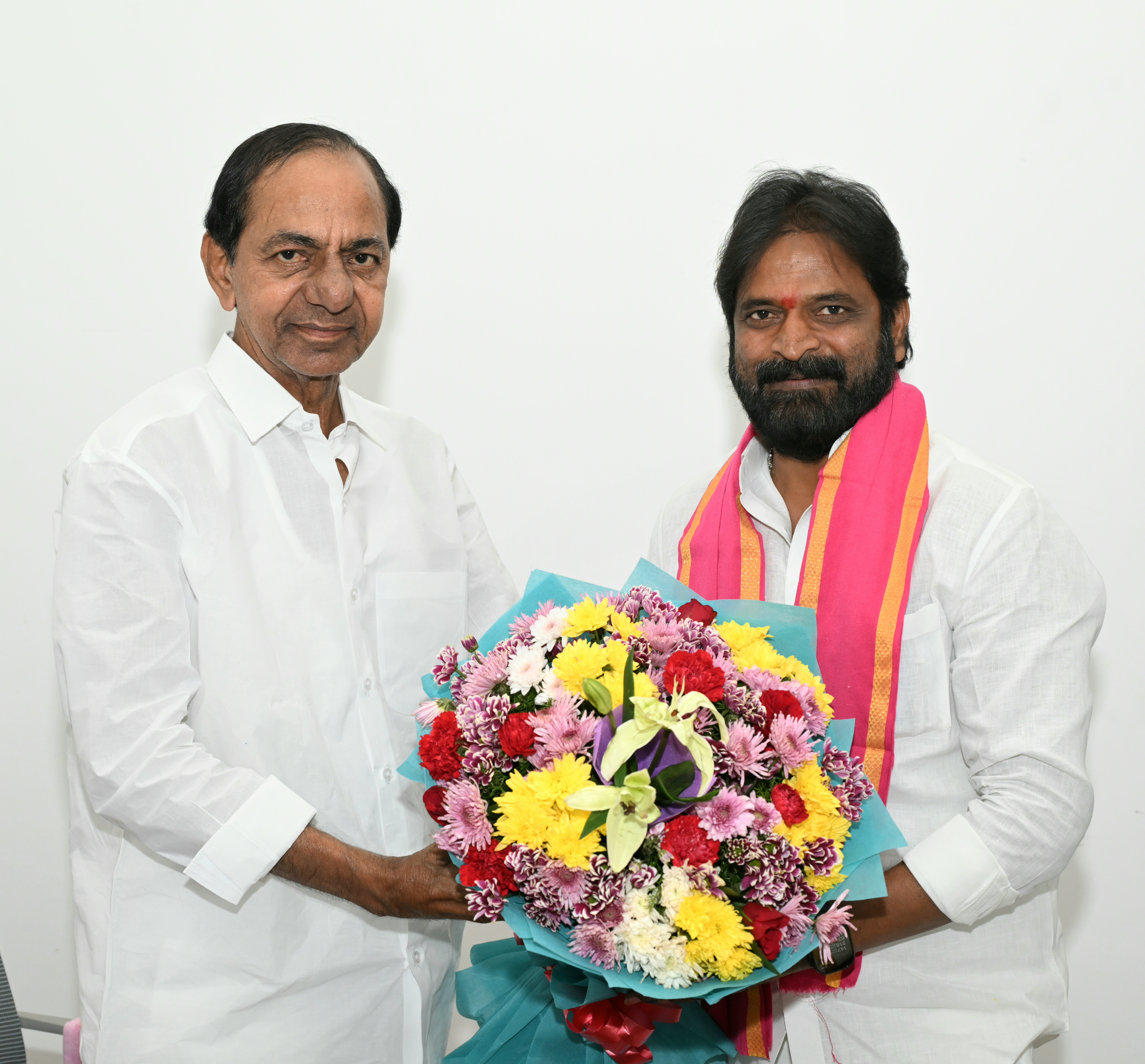
V.Srinivas Goud met Ex CM KCR on his Birthday 16 March 2025

== Career ==
Goud joined the government of Andhra Pradesh in 1998.

=== Political career ===
Goud resigned from his government job and joined the political party Telangana Rashtra Samithi on 13 March 2014. He had contested Telangana Legislative Assembly election, 2014 from Mahbubnagar constituency and won the seat. Srinivas Goud has been elected as Member of Legislative Assembly for the 2nd time with 57,775 majority in 2018 Telangana Legislative Assembly election. This being the highest majority win in combined Mahabubnagar district in 2019 elections. He is very close confidant of Chief Minister K ChandraShekar Rao and KTR. Goud has been inducted into the Telangana Cabinet on 19 February 2019, and has been allocated Prohibition & Excise, Youth Services, Sports, Tourism, Culture & Archeology Portfolios.

He lost the 2023 Telangana Legislative Assembly election with a margin of 18,738 votes.

== Personal life ==
Goud is married to Sharada and has two daughters.

== Doctorates ==
V Srinivas Goud received Doctorates from American University of Global Peace and Dayspring Christian University.
