= Narayanpet district =

- District of Telangana
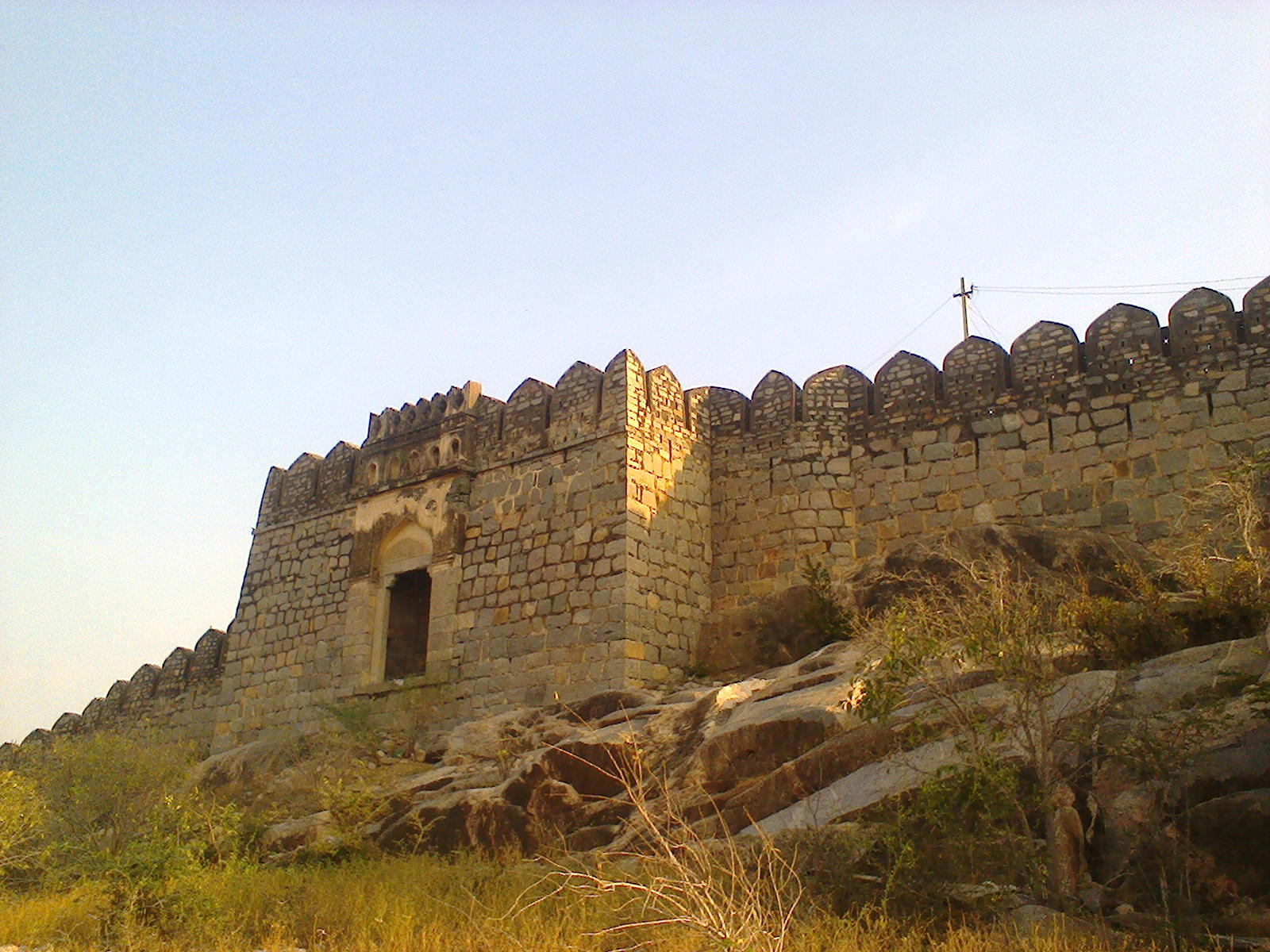
- Chandragadh Fort, Narva

- Location in Telangana
- Narayanpeta district
- Coordinates (Narayanpet): 16.746688°N 77.495815°E
- Country: India
- State: Telangana
- District Formation: 17 February 2019
- Founder: K. Chandrashekar Rao
- Headquarters: Narayanpet
- Mandalas: 13

Government
  - District collector: Koya Shri Harsha (IAS)
  - Parliament constituencies: Mahabubnagar

Area
  - Total: 2,336 km^{2} (902 sq mi)

Population (2011)
  - Total: 566,874
  - Density: 242.7/km^{2} (628.5/sq mi)
- Vehicle registration: TG-38
- Website: narayanpet.telangana.gov.in

Narayanpet district is a district in the Indian state of Telangana. Narayanpet is the district headquarters. Narayanpet district is located in western southern part of the state. The district shares boundaries with Mahbubnagar, Vikarabad, Wanaparthy and Jogulamba Gadwal districts and with the Karnataka state.

== History ==
Historically "Narayanapeta" has been in the Palamoor region by the 6th Century B.C Later Nandas, Mouryas, Sathavahanas, Ikshwakas, Vishnukundinas, Badami Chalukyas, Kanduri Chodas, Kakatiyas, Yadavas of Devagiri, Cheruku kings, Vavilala Reddy Kings, Munusuri Dyanasty, Bahamani Sultans, Vijayanagara Kings, Recharla Padmanayakas, Kutubshahis, Mughals and Nizam of Hyderabad ruled this area as the part of their Kingdom, this region was known as the land of the Cholas. Mahbub Ali Khan Asaf Jah VI, the Nizam of Hyderabad (1869-1911 AD) was changed the name of "Narayanapeta" to NARAYANPET on 4 December 1890. Narayanapeta was the headquarters of the district since 1883 AD.

The Golconda diamonds, including the famous Kohinoor Diamond, come from the Narayanapet district area.

== Administrative divisions ==
The district has 1 revenue division of Narayanapet and is sub-divided into 13 mandals

=== Mandals ===
Sr No.	Narayanpet revenue division
1	Damargidda
2	Dhanwada
3	Kosgi
4	Krishna
5	Maddur
6	Maganur
7	Makthal
8	Marikal
9	Narayanpet
10	Narva
11	Utkur
12	Gundumal
13	Kothapalli

== Demographics ==
Religion in Narayanpet district (2011)
Hinduism	90.76%
Islam	8.51%
Other or not stated	0.73%

At the time of the 2011 census of India, Narayanpet district had a population of 566,874, of whom 282,231 were men and 284,643 women. Narayanpet district has a sex ration of 1009 females per 1000 males and a literacy rate of 49.93%. 77,634 (13.70%) were under 6 years of age. 62967 (11.11%) lived in urban areas. Scheduled Castes and Scheduled Tribes made up 91,735 (16.18%) and 29,126 (5.14%) of the population respectively.

Languages of Narayanpet district (2011)
1. Telugu (81.4%)
2. Urdu (8.18%)
3. Lambadi (4.47%)
4. Kannada (3.87%)
5. Others (2.05%)

At the time of the 2011 census, 81.43% of the population spoke Telugu, 8.18% Urdu, 4.47% Lambadi and 3.87% Kannada as their first language.
