= Chittem Parnika Reddy =

Indian politician

Member of the Telangana Legislative Assembly
- Incumbent
- Assumed office 2023 December 3
- Constituency: Narayanpet Assembly constituency

Personal details
- Party: Indian National Congress
- Spouse: Vishwajith Reddy Chintalapani

Chittem Parnika Reddy (born 1993) is an Indian politician from the state of Telangana. She is elected to the 2023 Telangana Legislative Assembly election from Narayanpet Assembly constituency representing Indian National Congress. She defeated S. Rajender Reddy of Bharatha Rashtra Samithi by 7951 votes.

== Early life ==
Parinika hails from Dhanwada mandal in Narayanpet district. Her grandfather Chittem Narsi Reddy, who was elected as MLA from Makthal constituency was killed in an attack by Naxalites on 2005 Independence Day. Her father Venkateshwar Reddy was also killed in the same attack. She is the niece of D.K. Aruna, the BJP aspirant for the MP seat. Her uncle C. Ram Mohan Reddy contested on the BRS ticket from the neighbouring Makthal constituency and lost to the Congress candidate. She completed her MBBS and currently doing her specialisation.

== Career ==
Dr.Chittem Parnika Reddy is a first-time MLA from Narayanpet Assembly Constituency. She was appointed as Telangana Pradesh Congress Committee (TPCC) General Secretary on 9 June 2025.
