= Hanwada mandal =

Hanwada
- mandal
- Location in Telangana, India Hanwada (India)
- Coordinates: 16.7333°N 77.9333°E
- Country: India
- State: Telangana
- District: Mahaboob Nagar
- Elevation: 510 m (1,670 ft)

Languages
  - Official: Telugu
- Time zone: UTC+5:30 (IST)
- Vehicle registration: TS 06
- Climate: hot (Köppen)
- Website: telangana.gov.in

Hanwada or Honwada is a Mandal in Mahbubnagar district, Telangana.

== Geography ==
Honwada is located at 16.7333°N 77.9333°E. It has an average elevation of 510 metres (1676 ft).

== Villages ==
The villages in Hanwada mandal include:

- Ayodhyanagar
- Buddaram
- Chinnadarpally
- Dachakpally
- Gundyala
- Hanwada
- Ibrahimbad
- Kistampally
- Kohtapeta
- Kongatpally
- Madharam
- Munimoksham
- Nainonipally
- Peddadarpally
- Sallonipally
- Shaik Pally
- Tankara
- Thirumalagiri
- Vepur
