= Balanagar, Mahbubnagar district =

Balanagar
- Mandal
- Location in Telangana, India Balanagar (India)
- Coordinates: 16.9667°N 78.1667°E
- Country: India
- State: Telangana
- District: Mahaboob Nagar
- Elevation: 561 m (1,841 ft)

Languages
  - Official: Telugu
- Time zone: UTC+5:30 (IST)
- Postal code: 509202
- Vehicle registration: TS06
- Climate: hot (Köppen)
- Website: telangana.gov.in

Balanagar is a Mandal in Mahbubnagar district, Telangana. It is located on the National Highway 44 between Hyderabad and Kurnool.

== Geography ==
Balanagar is located at 16.9667°N 78.1667°E. It has an average elevation of 561 meters (1843 feet).
