= Jadcherla =

- Town
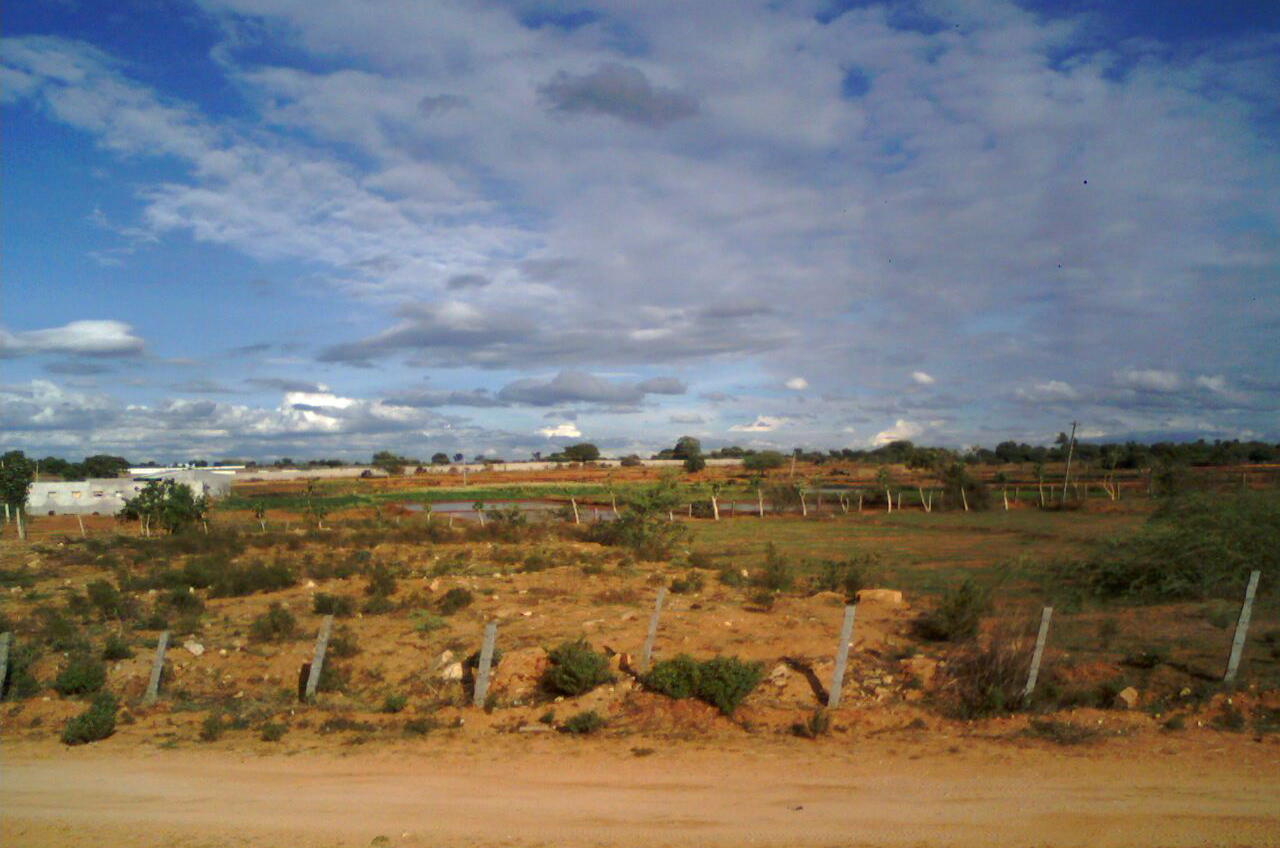
- View near Jadcherla town

- Jadcherla (Telangana) Jadcherla (India)
- Coordinates: 16.763000°N 78.144300°E
- Country: India
- State: Telangana
- District: Mahbubnagar

Area
  - Total: 4.83 km^{2} (1.86 sq mi)
- Elevation: 566 m (1,857 ft)

Population (2011)
  - Total: 17,958
  - Density: 3,720/km^{2} (9,630/sq mi)

Languages
  - Official: Telugu
- Time zone: UTC+5:30 (IST)
- PIN: 509301
- Telephone code: +91–8542
- Vehicle registration: TG06 (new) AP22 (old)
- Website: mahabubnagar.nic.in

Jadcherla is a census town in Mahbubnagar district of the Indian state of Telangana. It is located in Jadcherla mandal in Mahbubnagar revenue division. In 2011, it was upgraded from village to a census town, along with 11 other villages. It is a historical town and is known for its cultural heritage. Recently Jadcherla has been made a Municipality.

== Geography ==
Jadcherla is located at 16.7738°N 78.1367°E and at an altitude of 14 m (46 ft). The town is spread over an area of 550 km^{2} (210 sq mi). Jadcherla is located 86 km from Hyderabad 130km from Kurnool and 21 km from Mahabubnagar.

== Demographics ==
As of 2011 census, Jadcherla had a population of 17,958. The total population constitute, 9,083 males and 8,875 females —a sex ratio of 977 females per 1000 males. 2,251 children are in the age group of zero–six years, of which 1,139 are boys and 1,112 are girls. The average literacy rate stands at 75.25% with 11,820 literates, significantly higher than the state average of 67.41%.

== Government and politics ==
Jadcherla is a state Assembly/Vidhan Sabha constituency in the state of Telangana and is part of Mahbubnagar Lok Sabha/Parliamentary constituency. Jadcherla falls in Mahabubnagar district and South Telangana region of Telangana. It is categorised as a rural seat. Janampalli Anirudh Reddy is the present MLA of the constituency from Indian National Congress. It is also a part of Mahabubnagar lok sabha constituency which was won by DK Aruna of Bhartiya Janata Party.

== Economy ==
Pharmaceutical industry of Special Economic Zone and Green Industrial Park are for providing local employment. Apart from this, there are other sectors like, tourism and real estate contributing to the economy.

== Culture ==
There exists some of the historical religious structures. The Hindu temples include, 12th century Chennakeshava temple, Anjaneya temple, Maisamma temple, Parushaveri temple and Ranganayaka temple. The Jain shrine also exists by the name Gollatha Gudi. Other notable landmarks of the town are Nachiketa Tapovanam, Sitammajalu waterfall, Mayuri nursery etc.

Gollatha Gudi Jain Temple is near to Jadcherla

== Transport ==
Jadcherla Railway Station

The town connected to the major destinations through national and state highways. Asian highway 43 and NH 167 passes through the town. The State Highway 18 connects it with Nalgonda and SH 21 with Wanaparthy. TSRTC operates buses to various destinations from Jadcherla bus station. Jadcherla is as a railway station in Hyderabad railway division of South Central Railway zone.
