= Nawabpet mandal, Mahbubnagar district =

Nawabpet
- mandal
- Country: India
- State: Telangana
- District: Mahaboob Nagar

Languages
  - Official: Telugu
- Time zone: UTC+5:30 (IST)
- Vehicle registration: TS 06
- Climate: hot (Köppen)
- Website: telangana.gov.in

Nawabpet is a Mandal in Mahbubnagar district, Telangana.

== Villages ==
The villages in Nawabpet mandal include:

Rekulachowdapur

- Ammapur
- Chowdoor
- Dayapantula pally
- Deepalle
- Gurkunta
- Hajilapur
- Ippatur
- Kakarjala
- Kakarlapahad
- KAMARAM
- Karkonda
- Karoor
- Khanapur
- Kolloor
- Kondapur
- Kuchoor
- Lingampalle
- Lokirev
- Nawabpet
- Pomal
- Rudraram
- Siddotam
- Teegala Palle
- Yenmanagandla
