= Damaragidda =

- Village
- Damaragidda (Telangana) Damaragidda (India)
- Coordinates: 16°49′08″N 77°30′11″E
- Country: India
- State: Telangana
- District: Narayanpet district
- Elevation: 580 m (1,900 ft)

Languages
  - Official: Telugu
- Time zone: UTC+5:30 (IST)
- Vehicle registration: TG-38
- Website: telangana.gov.in

Damaragidda panchayat village in Narayanpet district, Telangana. The village of Damaragidda is the only village in the gram panchayat. The mandal is in the Narayanpet Assembly Constituency and Mahabubnagar Loksabha Constituency.

== Demographics ==
In the 2001 census Damaragidda Mandal had a population of 49,221.
