= Koilkonda =

- Mandal
- Koilkonda (Telangana) Koilkonda (India)
- Coordinates: 16.758600°N 77.788800°E
- Country: India
- State: Telangana
- District: Mahabub Nagar
- Elevation: 455 m (1,493 ft)

Languages
  - Official: Telugu
- Time zone: UTC+5:30 (IST)
- Vehicle registration: TS06
- Climate: hot (Köppen)
- Website: telangana.gov.in

Koilkonda is a Mandal in Mahbubnagar district, Telangana. This town is Mainly Connected to Mahabubnagar - Maddur, MBNR - Nrpt Towns/City.

Maddur (MDR) - Mahabubnagar (MBNR): BELONG TO THIS TOWN EVERY 1 HOUR 2 BUSSES FLIES. FROM ORIGIN: MADDUR TO Mahabubnagar Destination.

== Geography ==
Koilkonda is located at 16.7500°N 77.7833°E. It has an average elevation of 464 metres (1525 ft).

Situated nearby perched on a hilltop is the Koilkonda Fort, the erstwhile outpost of the Qutb Shahi dynasty. It is on the NH 7,125 km from Hyderabad. To reach the top, one needs to trudge across a deep canyon on the west or a series of streams if coming through east before reaching a plight of steps that leads to the fort. There are seven gates leading to the fort. The first one has an inscription of Ibrahim Qutb Shah that dates back to 1550. The fourth gate leads to a dilapidated palace. Along with the fort, which itself is a magnificent structure, there is also a mosque and an eidgah.

== Institutions ==
- There is a Fort in Koilkonda built by Ibrahim Qutub Shah, one of the Golkonda kings.
- Zilla Parishad High School.
- Guru Raghavendra Vidyalaya
- State Bank of Hyderabad.

== Villages ==
The villages in Koilkonda mandal include:

- Abhangapatnam
- Acharyapur
- Ankilla
- Burugupally
- Chandapur
- Chandraspalle
- Dammaipally
- Garlapad
- Ibrahimnagar
- Jamalpur
- Keshavapoor
- Khazipur
- Koilkonda
- Kothlabad
- Malkapur
- Manikonda
- Modipur
- Parpalle
- Perikiveedu
- Rampur
- Sanganonipally
- Serivenkatapur
- Suraram
- Thirumulampalle
- Veerampally
- Vinjamur
- Yellareddi Pally
- Lingupally
