= Devarakadra =

Devarkadra (Assembly constituency)
- Town
- Location in Telangana, India Devarkadra (Assembly constituency) (India)
- Coordinates: 16.6167°N 77.8500°E
- Country: India
- State: Telangana
- District: Mahabubnagar

Government
  - Body: Grama Panchayat
  - MP: Manne Srinivas Reddy (TRS)
- Elevation: 387 m (1,270 ft)

Population (2011 Census)
  - Total: 8,047
- Demonym: DVK

Languages
  - Official: Telugu
- Time zone: UTC+5:30 (IST)
- PIN: 509204
- Telephone code: 08542
- Vehicle registration: TS06
- Vidhan Sabha constituency: Devarakadra
- Lok Sabha Constitutency: Mahabubnagar
- Website: telangana.gov.in

Devarkadra is an Assembly constituency Headquarts in Telangana Assembly and also a Mandal in Mahbubnagar district, Telangana.

== Geography ==
Devarkadra is located at 16.6167°N 77.8500°E. It has an average elevation of 387 metres (1272 ft).

== Demographics ==
As of the 2011 Census of India, Devarakadara's population is 8,047. The population consists of 4,092 males and 3,955 females. The number of children age 0 to 6 is 966, 12.00% of the village's total population. The Sex Ratio of Devarkadra village is 967 females per 1,000 males, which is lower than the Telangana state average of 993 per 1,000. The Child Sex Ratio for Devarkadra is 872 females per 1,000 males, lower than the state average of 939 per 1,000.

Devarkadra village has a lower literacy rate compared to all of Telangana. In 2011, literacy rate of Devarkadra village was 65.54%, while it was 67.02% in Telangana. The Male literacy was 74.22%, and the female literacy rate was 56.69%.It was Comes Under the Mahabubnagar Urban Development Authority
