= Mahbubnagar =

Mahbubnagar Palamooru Rukmammapeta
- City
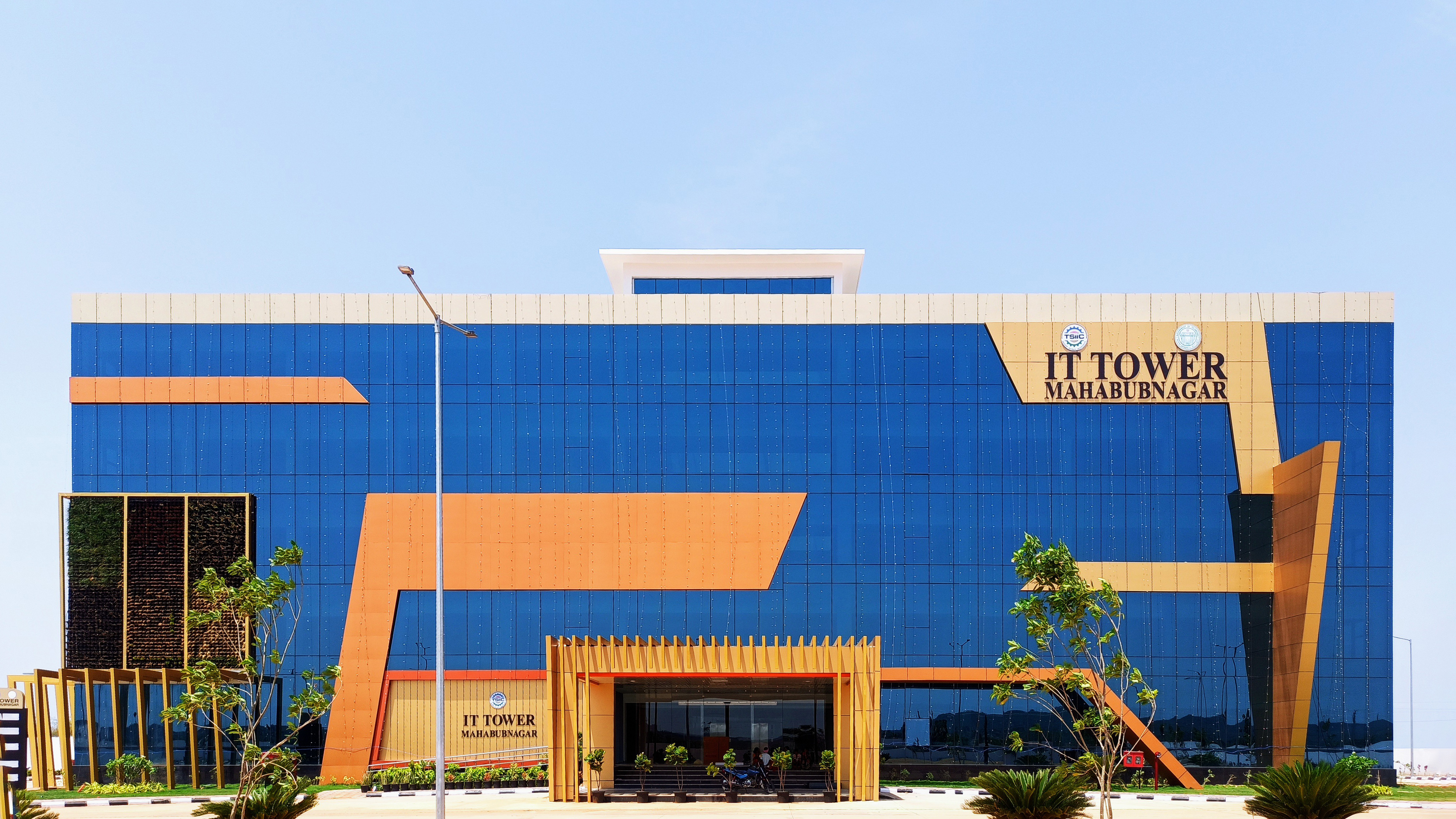
- Mahabubnagar IT Tower

- Mahbubnagar (Telangana) Mahbubnagar (India)
- Coordinates: 16.748800°N 78.003500°E
- Country: India
- State: Telangana
- Region: Deccan
- District: Mahbubnagar
- Named for: Mahboob Ali Khan

Government
  - Type: Municipal Corporation
  - Body: Mahabubnagar Municipal Corporation
  - Mayor: G. Mamatha (INC)
  - MLA: Yennam Srinivas Reddy (INC)
  - MP: D. K. Aruna (BJP)
  - MLC: Naveen Goud (BRS)

Area
  - City: 98.64 km^{2} (38.09 sq mi)
- Elevation: 519 m (1,703 ft)

Population (2011)
  - City: 222,573
  - Rank: 7th (2011)
  - Density: 4,803/km^{2} (12,440/sq mi)
  - Metro: Urban Agglomeration 300,000

Languages
  - Official: Telugu, Urdu
- Time zone: UTC+5:30 (IST)
- PIN: 509001
- Telephone code: 08542
- Vehicle registration: TG-06/AP-22(Old)
- Planning Agency: Mahbubnagar Urban Development Authority (MUDA)
- Lok Sabha constituency: Mahbub Nagar

Mahbubnagar, formerly known as Rukmammapeta and Palamooru is a city in Mahbubnagar District of the Indian state of Telangana named after the 6th Nizam of Hyderabad, Mahboob Ali Khan. It is the headquarters of Mahbubnagar mandal in Mahbubnagar revenue division. The city is also the largest in the district with an area of 39.64 km^{2} (15.31 sq mi) and 7th most populous in the state.

The region was historically known for milk production. On 4 December 1890, the name was changed to Mahbubnagar in honour of Mir Mahbub Ali Khan, the 6th Nizam of Hyderabad.

It is the headquarters of Palamoor mandal in Palamoor revenue division. The city is also the largest in the district with an area of 39.64 km^{2} (15.31 sq mi) and 7th most populous in the state.

== Etymology ==
Mahbubnagar was formerly known as Palamoor, meaning "land of milk" due to its milk production. The name was changed to Mahabubnagar on 4 December 1890, in honour of Mir Mahbub Ali Khan Asaf Jah VI, the Nizam of Hyderabad (1869–1911 AD).

== History ==
Mahbubnagar was under Janapada rule by 6th century BCE, and later under Maurya territory. The region was at the core of the Satavahana dynasty from 221 B.C.E. to 218 C.E., and also a large part of the Chalukya dynasty from the 7th to the 11th century CE, also part of the Kakatiya dynasty from 11th to the 14th century CE, The region was later part of the Kingdom of Golkonda (c. – 1512), with its capital city Golkonda located near Hyderabad.

In 1518, the region came under control of the Qutb Shahi dynasty, which reigned until 1687. The region was then a part of Hyderabad State, ruled by the Asaf Jahi Dynasty, from 1724 to 1948.

== Geography ==
Mahbubnagar is located at 16.73°N 77.98°E. It has an average elevation of 498 metres (1633 feet). The city of Mahbubnagar is located at a distance of 98 km from Hyderabad, 130 km from Kurnool and 151 km from Gulbarga.

== Demographics ==
Historical population
Year	Pop.	±%
1931	13,300	—
1941	16,462	+23.8%
1951	23,827	+44.7%
1961	35,588	+49.4%
1971	51,756	+45.4%
1981	87,503	+69.1%
1991	116,833	+33.5%
2001	139,662	+19.5%
2011	222,573	+59.4%

In 2011, Mahbubnagar had a population of 222,573 It is the 9th largest city of south India by number of auto rickshaws, and 2nd in Telangana after Hyderabad.

== Governance ==
Mahbub Nagar municipal corporation is the civic body of the city, which was constituted in 1942 as a third grade municipality. It was upgraded to second grade in 1959, to first grade in 1983 and finally to Special grade municipality in 2004 and got upgraded to Municipal Corporation in 2025. It is spread over an area of 98.64 km^{2} (38.09 sq mi). Mahbub Nagar urban agglomeration consists of Mahbub Nagar Municipal Corporation, census towns of Boyapalle, Yenugonda and the out growths of Mahbub Nagar (rural) (full), Yedira (part) village.

== Economy ==
Mahabubnagar has an IT Tower, inaugurated in 2023, as part of KTR's mantra of ‘3-D’ (Digitise, Decarbonise and Decentralise).

Paddy Fields Of Komireddipalle Village Mahabubnagar Telangana

Corning is establishing a manufacturing location in the town.

== Education ==
Mahbubnagar has a variety of educational institutions and a university named Palamuru University which gives affiliation to all colleges in the city and the united district of Mahbubnagar that includes the colleges of districts like Nagarkurnool, Wanaparthy, Narayanpet and Gadwal.

- Government Medical College, Mahbubnagar
- Palamuru University, Mahabubnagar
- Jayaprakaash Narayana College of Engineering, Mahbubnagar
- Sree Nagojirao Institute Technology and Science for Women, Mahbubnagar
- Sree Vishveswara Institute of Technology and Science, Mahbubnagar
- SVS Medical College, Mahbubnagar
- SVS Dental College, Mahbubnagar

== Transport ==
Mahabubnagar railway station

The city is connected to major cities and towns by means of road, railway and airway. National and state highways that pass through the city are NH 44, NH 167N and NH 167, State highway 20 and 23. TSRTC operates buses to various destinations from Mahbub Nagar bus station of the city.

=== Air ===
Rajiv Gandhi International Airport in Hyderabad is only 86 km from the city.

Mahbubnagar Airport is a proposed airport, for which multiple locations were surveyed and found unsuitable in 2025, new alternate locations are being reviewed to address the hurdles identified by the Airports Authority of India (AAI). including Devarakadra as a potential location.

=== Railway ===
The city has 4 railway stations in serving with the presence of MahbubNagar Main Station, Mahbub Nagar Town, Yenugonda Station and Diviti Pally Stations.

== Notable people ==
- Jaipal Reddy – Outstanding Parliamentarian, Former leader of Opposition in Rajya Sabha
- Burgula Ramakrishna Rao – First elected Chief Minister of Hyderabad State
- Pramod Mahajan – Former Union Minister
- Revanth Reddy – 2nd Chief Minister of Telangana
- Mallikarjun Goud – Former Union Minister
- D. K. Aruna – BJP National Vice President, Member of Parliament of Mahabubnagar Look Sabha
- Venkatarama Reddy – kotwal
- J. Rameshwar Rao – Former MP, Diplomat, Orient Longman Publishers founder
- Chitlem Narsi Reddy – Former Deputy Speaker of AP Assembly
- Jupally Krishna Rao – Minister
- A. P. Jithender Reddy – Former MP, businessman
- C. Laxma Reddy – Former Minister
- Gona Budda Reddy – Poet and king (13th Century)
- Nagam Janardhan Reddy – Former Minister
- Ravula Chandra Sekar Reddy – politician
- Ravula Ravindranath Reddy – politician
- Singireddy Niranjan Reddy – Lawyer and politician
- Suravaram Pratapa Reddy – freedom fighter and writer
- Goreti Venkanna – writer and singer
- Tejaswini Manogna – Miss Earth India 2019
- Manda Jagannath – Former MP
- Kapilavai Lingamurthy – Poet and writer
- Raghavendar Askani – activist, social entrepreneur

=== Climate ===
Climate data for Mahbubnagar (1991–2020, extremes 1952–2020)
Month	Jan	Feb	Mar	Apr	May	Jun	Jul	Aug	Sep	Oct	Nov	Dec	Year
Record high °C (°F)	36.8 (98.2)	40.3 (104.5)	42.3 (108.1)	45.3 (113.5)	45.3 (113.5)	44.8 (112.6)	38.3 (100.9)	37.5 (99.5)	37.2 (99.0)	37.6 (99.7)	37.2 (99.0)	36.3 (97.3)	45.3 (113.5)
Mean daily maximum °C (°F)	31.4 (88.5)	34.1 (93.4)	37.4 (99.3)	39.4 (102.9)	40.1 (104.2)	34.7 (94.5)	31.6 (88.9)	30.4 (86.7)	31.2 (88.2)	31.7 (89.1)	31.6 (88.9)	30.7 (87.3)	33.7 (92.7)
Mean daily minimum °C (°F)	17.2 (63.0)	19.4 (66.9)	22.8 (73.0)	25.7 (78.3)	27.3 (81.1)	24.8 (76.6)	23.7 (74.7)	23.0 (73.4)	22.9 (73.2)	21.6 (70.9)	19.4 (66.9)	17.0 (62.6)	22.0 (71.6)
Record low °C (°F)	10.1 (50.2)	11.6 (52.9)	15.4 (59.7)	16.6 (61.9)	19.1 (66.4)	20.1 (68.2)	18.6 (65.5)	20.0 (68.0)	18.5 (65.3)	13.4 (56.1)	11.3 (52.3)	10.5 (50.9)	10.1 (50.2)
Average rainfall mm (inches)	3.1 (0.12)	6.3 (0.25)	3.9 (0.15)	26.4 (1.04)	41.5 (1.63)	105.8 (4.17)	148.7 (5.85)	182.8 (7.20)	146.0 (5.75)	97.2 (3.83)	11.2 (0.44)	1.8 (0.07)	774.6 (30.50)
Average rainy days	0.2	0.3	0.6	1.8	2.6	7.5	10.8	11.5	8.8	5.2	0.8	0.2	50.3
Average relative humidity (%) (at 17:30 IST)	39	32	29	33	36	54	67	72	71	65	52	43	49
Source: India Meteorological Department
