= Mahabubnagar district =

Mahabubnagar district Palamooru district
- District of Telangana
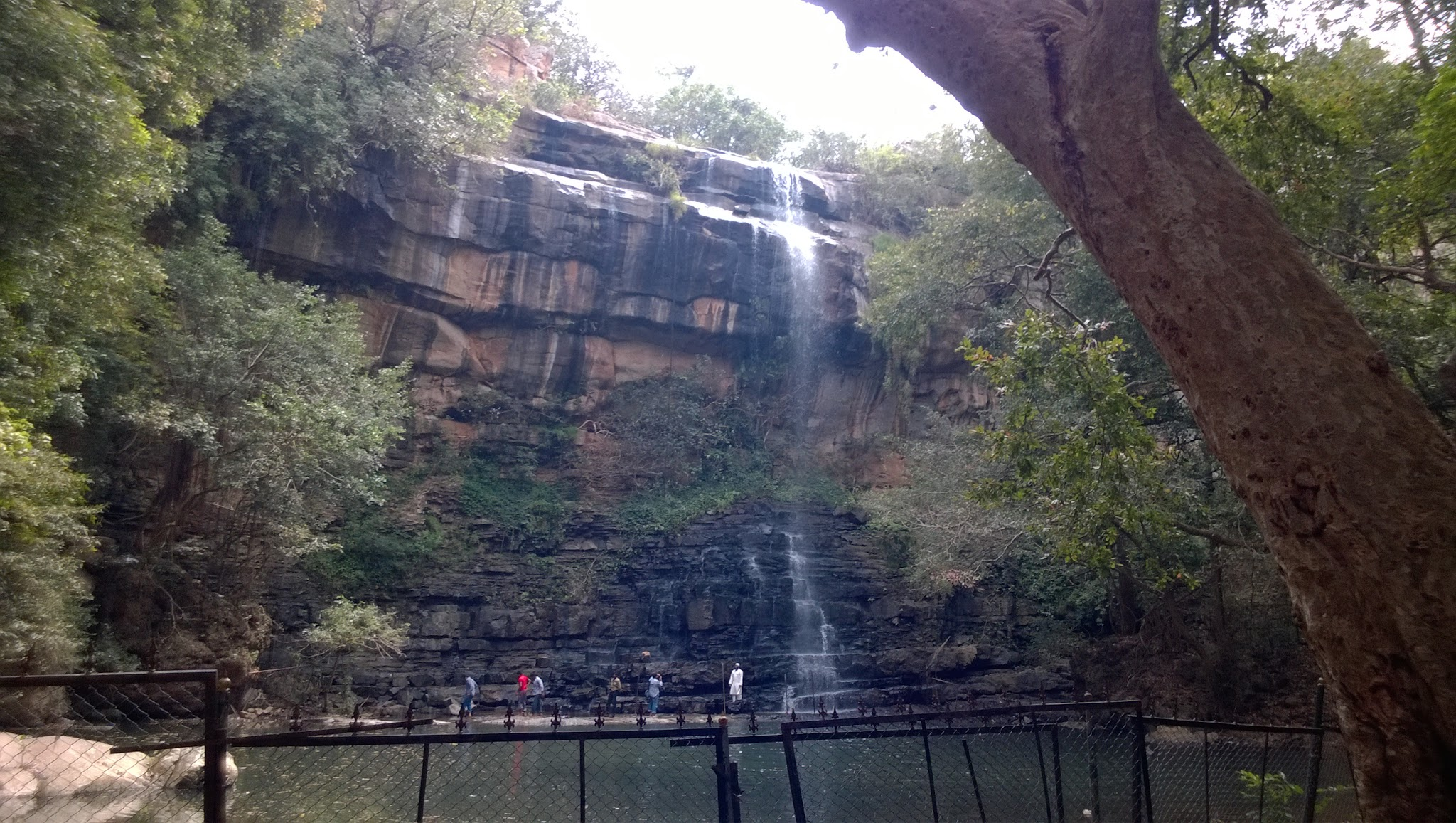
- Mallela Theertham waterfall
- Interactive map of Mahabubnagar district
- Country: India
- State: Telangana
- Headquarters: Mahabubnagar
- Mandalas: 16

Government
  - District collector: Ravi Gugulothu IAS

Area
  - Total: 2,738 km^{2} (1,057 sq mi)

Population (2011)
  - Total: 919,903
  - Density: 336.0/km^{2} (870.2/sq mi)
- Time zone: UTC+05:30 (IST)
- Vehicle registration: TG–06
- Website: mahabubnagar.telangana.gov.in

Mahabubnagar district, also known as Palamooru district, is a district in the Indian state of Telangana. Mahabubnagar is the district headquarters which is popularly known as Palamoor. The district shares boundaries with Narayanapet, Vikarabad, Rangareddy, Nagarkurnool, Wanaparthy and Jogulamba Gadwal districts. The district was formed during the period of the 6th Nizam of Hyderabad State – Nawab Mir Mahbub Ali Khan and is named after him.

== Etymology ==
Mahabubnagar was formerly known as Palamoor, meaning "land of milk" due to its milk production. The name was changed to Mahabubnagar on 4 December 1890, in honour of Mir Mahbub Ali Khan Asaf Jah VI, the Nizam of Hyderabad (1869–1911 AD).

== History ==
The area that forms current Mahbubnagar district has historic significance. It was under Janapada rule by 6th century BCE, and later was Maurya territory. The region was at the core of the Satavahana dynasty from 221 B.C.E. to 218 C.E., and also a large part of the Chalukya dynasty from the 7th to the 11th century CE, also part of the Kakatiya dynasty from 11th to the 14th century CE, The region was later part of the Kingdom of Golkonda (c. – 1512), with its capital city Golkonda located near Hyderabad.

In 1518, the region came under control of the Qutb Shahi dynasty, which reigned until 1687. The region was then a part of Hyderabad State, ruled by the Asaf Jahi Dynasty, from 1724 to 1948.

== Geography ==
Mahabubnagar district is spread over an area of 2,737.00 square kilometres (1,056.76 sq mi). The Krishna river flows through the district, as well as the Tungabhadra. They merge at Sangameswaram.

== Demographics ==
Religion in Mahabubnagar district (2011)
Hinduism	86.26%
Islam	12.41%
Christianity	0.74%
Other or not stated	0.59%

As of the 2011 census of India, the district has a population of 919,903. Mahbubnagar district has a sex ratio of 987 females per 1000 males and a literacy rate of 63.35%. 122,189 (13.28%) were under 6 years of age. 319,346 (34.72%) lived in urban areas. Scheduled Castes and Scheduled Tribes make up 129,340 (14.06%) and 105,547 (11.47%) of the population respectively.

Languages of Mahabubnagar district (2011)
1. Telugu (76.2%)
2. Urdu (12.2%)
3. Lambadi (10.6%)
4. Others (0.97%)

At the time of the 2011 census, 76.23% of the population spoke Telugu, 12.23% Urdu and 10.57% Lambadi as their first language.

== Jain temple ==
The oldest terracotta style Jain temple is in Alvanpalli village of Mahabubnagar district. This temple was built between 7th and 8th century. This temple is one of the two such structures in India other built during Gupta period is located at Bhitargaon under Kanpur district, Uttar Pradesh. This temple was built using bricks made of burnt clay. The large bricks of the temple were plaster using the limestone. The principal deity of the temple was Mahavira. The temple was around 18th century, since no efforts were being made to conserve it the rare structure the sculptures of Mahavira, Parsvanatha and few other historical importance had been moved to a local museum in Pillalamarri and some to the State Museum in the city.

== Economy ==
In 2006, the Indian government named Mahabubnagar one of the country's 250 most backward districts (out of 640 total). It is one of the nine districts in Telangana currently receiving funds from the Backward Regions Grant Fund Programme (BRGF).

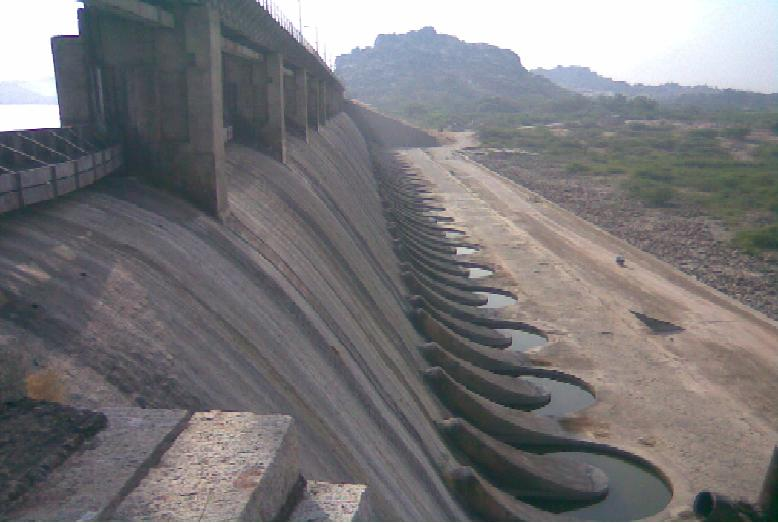
Koilsagar project

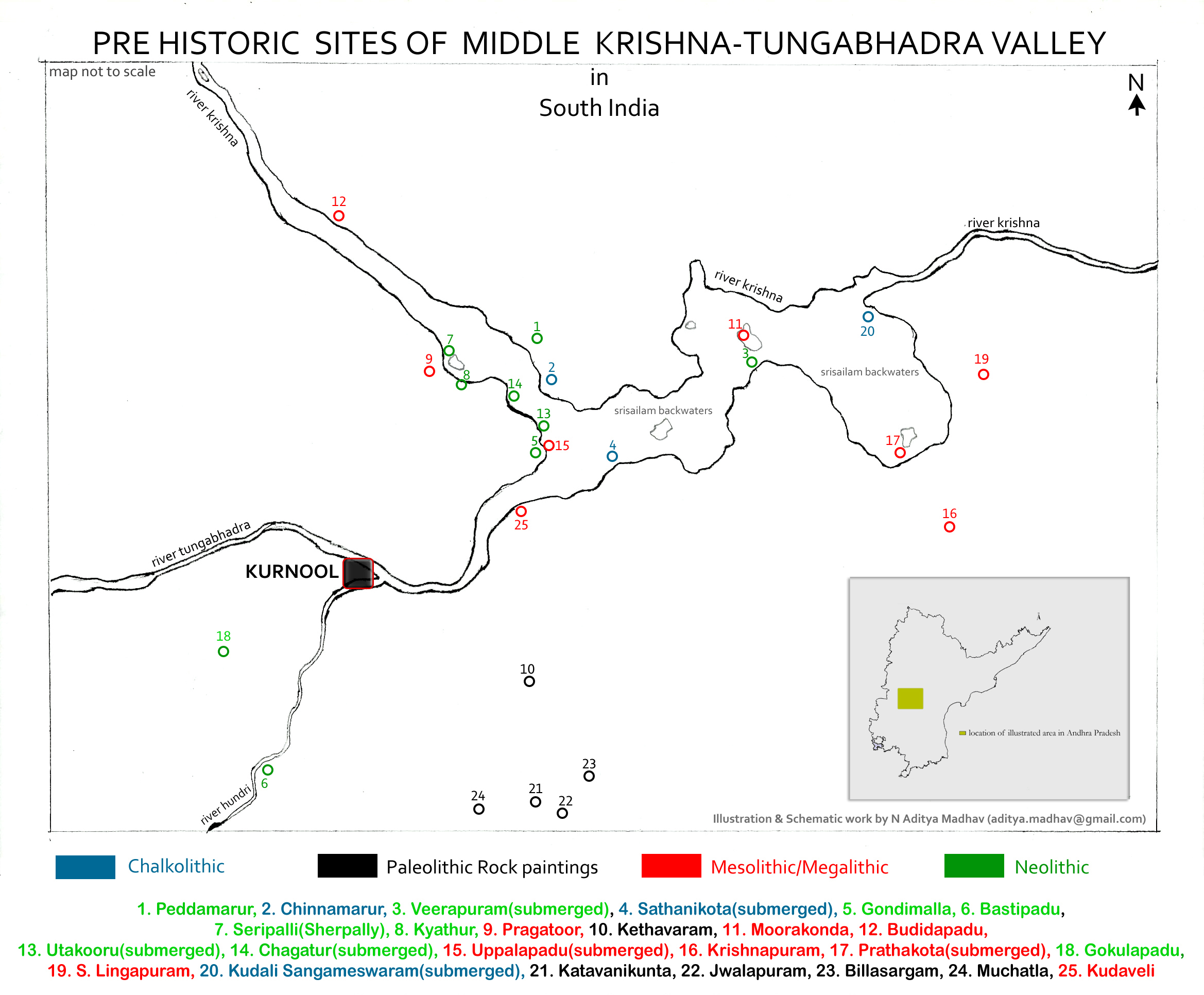
Many Pre Historic sites of Mid Krishna-Tungabhadra Valley are present in the erstwhile Mahabubnagar district and now in Jogulamba, Wanaparthy and Nagarkurnool districts

== Administrative divisions ==
The district has one revenue divisions of Mahabubnagar. These are sub-divided into 16 mandals. Ravi Gugulothu IAS is the present collector of the District.

#	mandals in District
1	Addakal
2	Balanagar
3	Bhoothpur
4	Chinnachintakunta
5	Devarakadra
6	Gandeed
7	Hanwada
8	Jadcherla
9	Koilkonda
10	Mahabubnagar(Urban)
11	Mahabubnagar(Rural)
12	Midjil
13	Moosapet
14	Nawabpet
15	Rajapur
16	Koukuntla
17	Mohammadabad

== Notable people ==
- V. Srinivas Goud – politician
- Suravaram Pratapareddy – social historian
- Burgula Ramakrishna Rao – former Chief Minister of Hyderabad State
- Devarakonda Vittal Rao – politician
- Jaipal Reddy – politician
- Nagam Janardhan Reddy – politician
- Venkatarama Reddy - kotwal
- Goreti Venkanna – singer
- B. Venkateshwarlu – writer and journalist

== Education ==
Mahabubnagar district falls under the jurisdiction of Osmania University and Palamuru University. The district has many government and private medical college, junior, undergraduate and graduate colleges.

== See also ==
- List of districts in Telangana
- Gaddampally
