= Gona Ganna Reddy =

13th century ruler in southern India

- Reign: 1262 CE – 1296 CE
- Spouse: Annaambika
- Father: Gona Budda Reddy

Gona Ganna Reddy (r. 1262 – 1296 CE) was a military chieftain and an influential figure during the Kakatiya dynasty. He ruled Vardhamaanapuram (now Nandi Vaddeman) in present-day Nagarkurnool district and was a loyal supporter of Rani Rudrama Devi, one of the few female rulers in Indian history.

As a key military leader, Gona Ganna Reddy played an instrumental role in maintaining the stability of the Kakatiya dynasty, particularly in supporting Rudrama Devi's rule. He contributed to several infrastructural projects, including the construction of lakes with his brother-in-law, Danda Senani. He was the son of Gona Budda Reddy.

== Life ==
Gona Ganna Reddy had two brothers and one sister. They were Gona Ganapayya Reddy, Gona Vitala and Kuppambika.

His grandsons Gona Kacha Reddy and Vitalanatha's contributions include the completion of the Uttarakaanda section in the Ranganatha Ramayanam. Ranganatha's version was the first and foremost Ramayanam written in Telugu literary history by his son Gona Budda Reddy. His sister, Kuppambika is known to be the first Telugu woman poet as per Buddhapuram inscriptions. Kuppambika married Malyala Gundadandadheeshudu, who was also known as Danda Senani.

Gona Ganna Reddy married the love of his life Annaambika, best friend of Rudramadevi. A 400-page Kakatiya historical novel was written by Adavi Baapiraju in 1946.

Khilla Ghanpur, a town in South Telangana near Mahabubnagar and Wanaparthy, also known as Ganapuram, is named after him and the Kakatiya king Ganapati Deva. He constructed several lakes with the help of his brother-in-law Danda Senani during Kakatiya's rule. After Gona Ganna Reddy's death, his brother-in-law, Malyala Gundadandadheeshudu also known as Danda Senani, became the king of Vardhamaanapuram.

== Gona Dynasty ==
During the Kakatiya dynasty (995–1323), Gona Budda Reddy ruled a kingdom in Mahbubnagar district from Vardhamaanapuram (currently known as Nandi Vaddemaan) and Khilla Ghanpur (Fort Ghanpur) in modern-day Ghanpur, Mahbubnagar district. He and his family, the Gona dynasty, was mostly loyal to the Kakatiya dynasty. When he died, his brother Gona Lakuma Reddy took over the kingdom and rebelled against the Kakatiya, but his son Gona Ganna Reddy remained loyal to them in Vardamanapuram, (1262–1296 CE) indirectly supporting the rule of Kakatiya Queen Rudrama Devi against opposition to female rule.

After the Buddapuram (present-day Bhoothpur) war, Kakatiya's King Prataparudra II married Gona Ganna Reddy's daughter at Khilla Ghanpur fort.

According to Dr.Sanganabhatla Narsaiah and as per all the 11 inscriptions related to Gona family, he gave the following genealogy.

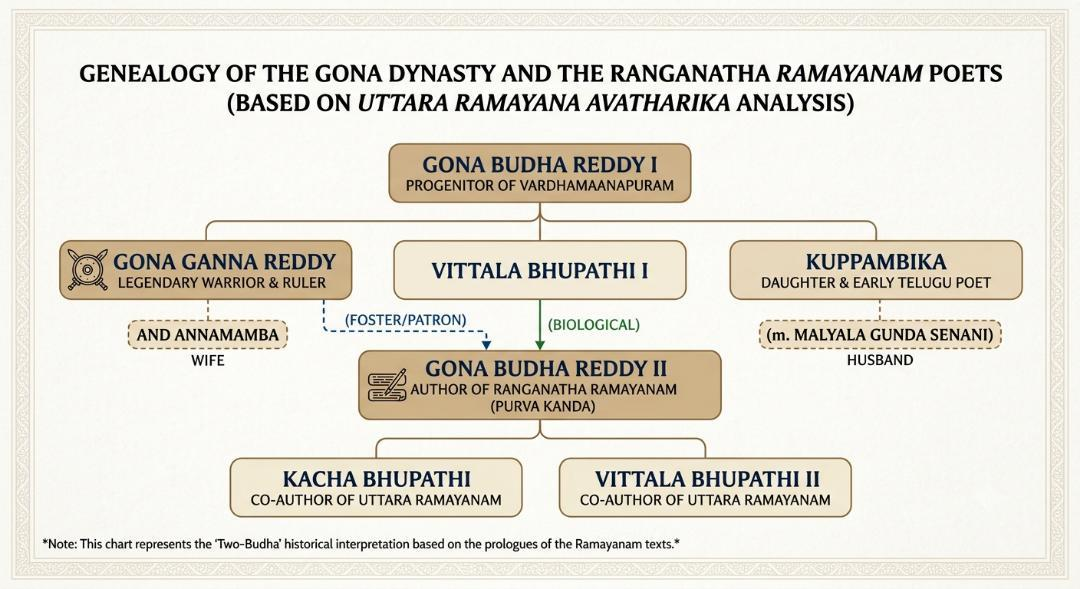
Family Tree of Gona Reddy Kings

== In popular culture ==
In the 2015 film Rudhramadevi, Gona Ganna Reddy was portrayed by Allu Arjun.
