= Khilla Ghanpur =

Coordinates: 16°33′44″N 78°3′25″E

- Part of Vardhamanapuram Kingdom in 13th Century
- Khilla Ghanpur, Telangana, India

Site information
- Type: Fort
- Condition: Ruins

Site history
- Built: 13th century
- Built by: Gona Ganna Reddy, Malyala Gundadandadeeshudu and Recherla Padma Nayaka king Singamanayaka-I
- Materials: Stone and mud
- Battles/wars: Many
- Events: Prataparudra's wedding

Khilla Ghanpur is a historic place equidistant, 25 km, from Mahabubnagar and Wanaparthy towns of Telangana state, India. It is 111 kilometers away from Hyderabad city.

== History ==
Khilla Ghanpur or Ghanpur, Wanaparthy district was ruled by Recherla Padmanayaka, Malyala and Gona dynasties in 13th century. Recherla Padmanayaka, Gona and Malyala dynasty kings were the Feudatores of Kakatiya Kings. Khilla Ghanpur has a fort and a lake (known as Ganapa Samudram) built during Kakatiya dynasty rule. The lake, Ganapa Samudram, was constructed by the King Malyala Gunda Dandadeeshudu (also known as Malyala Gundanna) during Rudrama Devi’s rule. Malyala Gunda Dandadeeshudu married Gona Budda Reddy’s daughter.

Gona kings and Malyala kings were loyal to Kakatiya kings. Gona Budda Reddy had three sons and one daughter. Gona Ganapa Reddy (also known as Gona Ganna Reddy), Gona Kacha Reddy, Gona Vitalanatha and Kuppambika. Kacha Reddy and Vitalanatha Reddy were poets, who penned to complete the Ranganatha Ramayanam started by their father, Gona Budda Reddy. Ranganatha Ramayanam was the first Telugu Ramayanam written in Telugu literature by Gona Budda Reddy. This is written in Dwipada Chandassu). Gona Budda Reddy’s daughter married Malyala Gunda Dandadeeshudu.

After Gona Budda Reddy’s death, his brother Gona Lakuma Reddy took over the kingdom. Gona Lakuma Reddy was not loyal to Kakatiya kings. After observing that his uncle Lakuma Reddy not being loyal to Kakatiya kings, Gona Ganna Reddy, took over the kingdom of Vardhamaanapuram and helped Kakatiya kings in many wars. After Gona Ganna Reddy rule, his brother-in-law Malyala Gundanna became the king of Vardhamanapuram. Malyala Gundanna constructed several lakes with the help of his brother-in-law Gona Ganna Reddy at the time of Rudrama Devi's rule.

Buddapuram (present-day Bhoothpur) and Vardhamana Puram (Nandi Vaddeman, near Bijinapalle) are the centers for Malyala Kings. These kings helped to Kakatiyas in many wars during the period of Ganapathi Deva, Rudrama Devi and Prataparudra. After Malyala Gundanna's death, His wife, Malyala Kuppambika constructed a temple known as Buddeshwaralayam at Bhoothpur.

== Fort ==
Ghanpur has a hill fort and was built by joining two mountains by Gona Ganapa Reddy and Recherla Padma Nayakulu (Singama Nayakudu I) in 13th century. This fort had witnessed many wars between Bahamanis, Vijayanagara Kings, Bijapur Kings and Qutb Shahi Kings, etc. The cannons which still exist have been kept on the top most side of the fort. We can also see palace and ministers houses ruins.

The name of Ganapuram Khilla came into existence from the name of Kakatiya Ruler Sri Ganapathi Deva. The village was Naginenipally before it is named after Kakatiya Ruler Ganapathideva by Gona Ganna Reddy. People believe that there are two secret tunnels inside of the fort. One is connected with the village at the bottom of the mountain and the other one is connected to the Panagal fort. After Buddapuram war, Kakatiya's last king Pratapa Rudra married to Gona Ganna Reddy's daughter in this Fort.

The fort has beautiful rockscapes and greenery with two ponds which were used as drinking water supply for the fort army. There are many adventure activities that can be done here including rappelling, rock climbing, caving, etc.

== Named after Kakatiya King Ganapathi Deva ==
Khilla Ghanpur also known as Ghanpur, Ganapuram, was named after Kakatiya king Ganapathi Deva. Since this Ghanpur has a Khilla (Khilla means fort in Urdu and Hindi language). The name "Khilla Ghanpur" became much more popular. There are several towns in Kakatiya kingdom with its name as Ghanpur. These names can be found more in Warangal, Mahabubnagar and Nalgonda districts.

There were several places in Kakatiya Kingdom which were named after the Kakaitya king Ganapathi Deva (with the name Ganapuram, which eventually turned as Ghanpur, Ghanapur, Ghanapuram and so on).

== Tourism, Fort and Lakes ==
The fort is spread on rocky and hilly area of 4 Sq kilometers and there are fort buildings spread across the top most part of the hill.

The fort was well built with cannons on the upper side of the fort. There are several remains of the walls and building blocks inside the fort. There are several temples inside the fort like Veerabhadra Temple, Narasimha Temple and Chowdeswari Temple. There are several caves on the hilltop and provide good opportunity for exploration.

There are two ponds inside the fort with fresh water and they are good for swimming. There are several hills around the fort and they provide good opportunity for trekking as well. Ghanpur Lake is a large lake situated close to the Ghanpur village and the view of the lake from the fort is picturesque.

== Temples ==
1. Anjanagiri Venkateshwara Swamy Temple.

== Notable people ==
- Gona Ganna Reddy - King 13th Century
- Kuppambika - Poetess 13th Century
- Malyala Gundadandadeeshudu - King 13th Century (Husband of Kuppambika)

== Grama Panchayat ==
Ghanpur Grampanchayat has 14 wards and has a population of 7740+ as per Census - 2011.

Duration	Name of the Sarpanch
1998-2002	Krishnaiah Goud
2002-2008	Sonnati Padmamma
2008-2012	Kyama Venkataramana
2013-2018	Samya Naik
2019- Incumbent	Kyama Venkataramana
