= Gona =

Gona may refer to:

== People ==
- Gona Budda Reddy
- Gona Ganna Reddy
- Marigona Dragusha, Kosovar model

== Places ==
- Gona, Ethiopia
- Gona, Papua New Guinea
- Gona Barracks, Australia
