= Ranganatha Ramayanamu =

Telugu poem about Rama by Gona Budda Reddy

Information
- Religion: Hinduism
- Author: Gona Budda Reddy
- Language: Telugu
- Chapters: 7 cantos
- Verses: 17,290 couplets (in Dwipada metre)

Sri Ranganatha Ramayanamu (Telugu: శ్రీ రంగనాథ రామాయణము) is a rendition of Valmiki's Rāmāyaṇa in the Telugu language, composed by 13th-century Indian Telugu poet Ranganatha also known as Gona Budda Reddy between 1220 and 1240 CE. It was composed in 17,290 couplets (in Dwipada metre). This metre allows the epic to be either recited like Valmiki’s Ramayana (composed in Anushtubh metre) or sung in folk and musical performances.

It is widely recognised by scholars as the earliest textual source that introduced the Lakshmana rekha motif into the written literature. While the Valmiki Ramayana contains no line drawn on the ground, the work depicts Lakshmana actively drawing an impassable, protective boundary line on the ground around Sita’s dwelling before departing into the forest.

Telugu possesses a very rich literary heritage dating back to the 11th century CE. Although there are more than forty adaptions of the Valmiki Ramayana which are partly or completely in Telugu, only four adaptions have covered the entire theme of the original epic. They are Ranganatha Ramayanam, Bhaskara Ramayanam, Molla Ramayanam, and Ramayana Kalpavruksham.

== Structure and Deviations ==
Although Ranganatha follows the theme of the Valmiki Ramayana, he still made changes in some incidents which effects the course of events. The theme of the Ranganatha Ramayana has been classified under seven cantos (kandas).

- Bala Kanda (Chapter: Childhood; బాల కాండ): This covers the theme starting from the conversation between Valmiki and Narada to the return of Rama to Ayodhya after his marriage with Sita from Mithila.
- Ayodhya Kanda (Chapter: Ayodhya; అయోధ్యకాండ)
- Aranya Kanda (Chapter: Forest; అరణ్యకాండ)
- Kishkindha Kanda (Chapter: Kishkindha; కిష్కిందకాండ )
- Sundara Kanda (Chapter: Beautiful;సుందరకాండ )
- Yudha Kanda (Chapter: War;యుద్ధకాండ)
- Uttara Kanda (Chapter: Last;ఉత్తరకాండ)

== Key Narrative additions ==
=== Origins of Manthara’s enmity ===
Unlike the Valmiki’s Ramayana where Manthara's entry is in Ayodhya kanda. Ranganatha Ramayanamu introduces her early in the Bala Kanda. When Rama was playing with a ball and a stick, suddenly Manthara threw the ball far away from Rama. In anger, Rama struck her on the knee with the stick and her knee was broken. This message was conveyed to king Dasaratha by Kaikeyi. The king decided to send Rama and his other sons to school. This incident makes the king to think about his responsibility of educating his sons, so that they can learn and become wise. Manthara had developed a kind of antagonism towards Rama and was waiting for an opportunity to take revenge against him.

=== Introduction of the Lakshmana Rekha ===
In the Aranya Kanda, before leaving the Panchavati Hermitage to assist Rama in pursuit of the golden deer, Lakshmana explicitly draws an impassable boundary on the ground around Sita’s dwelling using the tip of the bow. Known as Lakshmana rekha, this mystical threshold prevents any malevolent force from crossing unless invited. Ranganatha Ramayanamu stands as the earliest recorded literary work to feature this motif, an episode completely absent from the Valmiki’s Ramayana.

=== The devotion of the Squirrel ===
Ranganatha added some significant incidents to make the theme more natural and reliable. For example, when Rama sethu was built, a squirrel thinks that it should help Sri Rama to achieve his end; it dips in the sea water, rolls down in the sand and gets rid of the sand in the middle of the rocks under construction. Knowing this, Sri Rama blesses squirrel for its devotion and draws three lines on its back with his fingers. The three white lines on the back of squirrels are supposed to have come into existence in this way.
