= Ghanpur =

Ghanpur may refer to several places in the Indian state of Telangana:

- Ghanpur, Mulugu district
- Ghanpur, Jangaon district
- Ghanpur, Ranga Reddy district
- Ghanpur, Wanaparthy district
