= Kuppambika =

- Reign: 13th century CE
- Spouse: Malyala Gundadandadeeshudu
- Father: Gona Budda Reddy
- Occupation: Queen, poet

Kuppambika (Telugu: కుప్పాంబిక;) was a Telugu poet.

== Biography ==
She was the daughter of the king and poet Gona Budda Reddy, who wrote Ranganatha Ramayanam in Telugu. She was the younger sister of Gona Ganna Reddy and wife of Malyala Gunda Dandadeeshudu.

After her husband's death, Kuppambika constructed a Shiva temple Gundeshwaraalayam at Buddapuram. She issued Buddapuram inscriptions in the 13th century. The inscriptions depict her to be the first Telugu woman poet.

A popular poet, Ayyalaraju Ramabhadrudu read her poems in front of the people and King Krishnadevaraya. As mentioned by Ayyalaraju Ramabhadrudu in his compositions. He took the following poem written in Telugu literature by Kuppambika. It describes the feelings of a girl who transitioned to teenage.

వనజాతాంబకుడేయు సాయకములన్ వర్జింపగా రాదు, నూ
తన బాల్యాధిక యౌవనంబు మదికిన్ ధైర్యంబు రానీయద
త్యనురక్తిన్ మిముబోంట్లకున్ దెలుప నాహా! సిగ్గుమైకోదు పా
వన వంశంబు స్వతంత్రమీయదు చెలీ! వాంఛల్ తుదల్ముట్టునే
