= Rudhramadevi (film) =

- Theatrical release poster
- Directed by: Gunasekhar
- Written by: Gunasekhar
- Produced by: Gunasekhar; Raagini Guna; Neelima Guna; Yukthamukhi Guna
- Starring: Anushka Shetty; Allu Arjun; Rana Daggubati; Vikramjeet Virk; Krishnam Raju; Prakash Raj
- Cinematography: Ajayan Vincent
- Edited by: A. Sreekar Prasad
- Music by: Ilaiyaraaja
- Production company: Gunaa Teamworks
- Distributed by: Gunaa Teamworks
- Release date: 9 October 2015
- Running time: 157 minutes
- Country: India
- Language: Telugu
- Budget: ₹60–80 crore (Note: India Today estimates the film's budget to be ₹60 crore. The Indian Express estimates the film's budget to be ₹60 crore.)
- Box office: est. ₹84 crore

Rudhramadevi is a 2015 Indian Telugu-language biographical action film based on the life of Rudrama Devi, one of the prominent rulers of the Kakatiya dynasty in the Deccan, and one of the few ruling queens in Indian history. The film, written and directed by Gunasekhar, features Anushka in the title role alongside Allu Arjun, Rana Daggubati, Vikramjeet Virk, Krishnam Raju, Prakash Raj, Suman, Nithya Menen, Adithya, and Catherine Tresa. The film was narrated by Chiranjeevi. The film's soundtrack and background score were composed by Ilaiyaraaja.

Rudhramadevi was released worldwide on 9 October 2015, with dubbed versions in Hindi and Malayalam languages. The Tamil version was released by Sri Thenandal Films on 16 October. The film opened to mixed reviews and grossed ₹87 crore at the worldwide box office. The film became the fifth highest opening day grossing Indian film of 2015. Rudhramadevi went on to win the Telangana state Gaddar Film Award for Best Feature Film.

== Plot ==
Ganapatideva (Krishnam Raju) is the emperor of the Kakatiya dynasty who rules the Kakatiya Empire from Orugallu (present day Warangal, Telangana) as its capital city. There are only two threats to Ganapati's rule. Murari Devudu and Hari Hara Devudu, dukes of Kakatiya, are both obviously unsatisfied with Ganapati's reign, and plot to usurp the throne. Emperor Singhana of the Devagiri Empire also wishes to conquer the Kakatiyas and name his grandson and heir, Mahadeva, as the king. Meanwhile, Ganapati's wife is pregnant and everyone prays for a boy child, because a prince can repel the Devagiri Empire and serve as a successor to the throne. A priest working for Murari and Hari Hara predicts Ganapati's baby will be a girl who will be the saviour of the kingdom.

Ganapati's baby indeed turns out to be a girl, Rudramadevi. Her birth disappoints Ganapati, who, being helpless, takes advice from his prime minister, Siva Devayya, to announce the baby to be a boy – Rudradeva. Murari and Hari Hara go mad after hearing the news that Ganapati gets a prince, a successor to be of the crown; they then angrily kill the priest who predicted king's heir would be a girl. Rudrama's gender and real name are kept secret from everyone other than Ganapati, his wife, and Siva Devayya; even Rudramadevi herself does not know she's a girl in her childhood.

She is then brought up and trained in a prince's manner. After a few years of training, Rudrama, who goes about as Rudradev is summoned back to Oragallu for her coronation as the crown prince. At her coronation, she befriends Chalukya Veerabhadra, a neighborhing prince, and forms a friendly rivalry with Gona Ganna Reddy, another neighboring prince. She sneaks out of the capital along with Chalukya to bathe in the river. She realizes her gender when she sees an elegant statue of a beautiful woman. After seeing the boys disrobe, she realizes that her body is different from theirs. She then runs to her mother angrily and confusedly to ask the reason for hiding her real gender; her mother confesses the story and tells her the reason was to protect the kingdom. In front of her parents and Siva Devayya, Rudrama swears to continue living as a boy until the kingdom's safety is assured.

Years later, in a sporting event, Naga Devudu, the nephew of Murari and Hari Hara, fails to subdue a raging elephant. Murari and Hari Hara challenge Rudradeva to defeat the elephant. Rudradeva who was Rudrama accepts, however she is unaware that Murari and Hari Hara have rigged the competition so no one can win. Despite this, Rudrama wins the challenge, that adored the by several princesses in the scene, including Muktamba.Younger sister Ganapamba spoke to Muktamba and the others with pride and admiration about her brave elder brother, Rudradeva.

Gona Ganna Reddy, one of Rudrama's playmates in childhood and who was then thrown out of the palace and is now called a traitor, shows up in the scene to confront Rudrama. Gona is now the leader of an opposition army, which has been a threat to Ganapati's position. He manages to escape when Ganapati's army tries to arrest him. On the day of the Koumudi festival, Muktamba, Anambika, and Ganapamba were joyfully celebrating with drinks. During their merriment, Anambika shared her affection for Ganna Reddy, while Muktamba confessed her fondness for Rudradeva. Unbeknownst to them, Rudradeva was secretly watching it all. Suddenly, he went into a hidden chamber, removed all his battle armor, and transformed into Rudrama. She longed to celebrate the femininity that lived within her.

After the festival celebration, he happens to see her emerging from the river after a dip. Still caught in the thought of being Rudradeva, she absentmindedly calls him “friend,” only to suddenly realize that she is now Rudhrama. Embarrassed, she blushes deeply. From the very first moment he sees her, he feels drawn to her. But Rudhramaa teasingly pushes him into the river and walks away.

Ganapati, unable to escape from the pressure from inside and outside his palace, decides to get Rudrama married to a princess as being Rudradeva, and he chooses Muktamba. Then Chalukya forgot Rudradeva’s royal duties and lost himself in love. Being Rudrama, in her graceful form, she shared his affection but told him she would marry him only after he fulfilled the duties. Then Chalukya said he would complete them and return to her, affectionately holding her nose. She responded with a teasing smile. On their wedding night, Rudrama, in order to protect her secret, tells Muktamba that she has taken a vow of celibacy until the kingdom is safe. The conversation is tapped by a spy of Murari and Hari Hara, and she tells it to the two, making the secret and the fame of the Ganapati's family in danger.

In a secluded spot by the riverside Chalukya lies absorbed in thoughts of love. Rudradeva approaches him and reprimands him for neglecting his duties, challenging him outright. He declares that if Chalukya can defeat him in a sword duel, he will help Chalukya marry the woman he loves. But if Chalukya loses, he must forget her and return to his responsibilities and he accepts the challenge, and the two engage in a long, intense fight. During the prolonged duel, Chalukya’s sword accidentally slashes through the middle of Rudradeva’s tunic. The force of the strike tears it open, revealing a woman’s torso wrapped in a breast-band and that blow also knocks Rudradevan off-balance; his headgear falls, and his tightly bound hair comes loose.

In that instant, Chalukya's warrior friend Rudradeva suddenly becomes his love interest Rudradevi. Overwhelmed with shame and unable to hide the truth any longer, she admits her deception, guilt written all over her face..The two plan to reveal the secret and use it as an excuse to force Ganapati off the throne. However, before they can do so, Siva Devayya decides to reveal the secret to the people. When Ganapamba knows that her one long respected elder brother were revealed was a woman named Rudrama, she lovingly embraced her, gently held and pampered her chin like an elder sister's caring.

Anambika and Muktamba adorned and dressed Rudrama as one of their own. Though she was the oldest among them, Rudrama behaved like the youngest. Because it was their first time celebrating together, she tried to hide the blush that colored her cheeks from shyness, but Anambika and Muktamba noticed and started laughing as Rudrama, bites her nails in embarrassment and squirmed a little when Mukthaba tickled her on the waist. Once hidden behind the guise of Rudradeva, she now fully embraces her true nature of the shyness and beauty of womanhood.

Siva Devayya then announces Rudramadevi's real identity and her to be the queen of the kingdom. The people of Kakatiya, after knowing Ganapati has cheated them for many years, become angry and unsatisfied and strongly object. Rudramadevi is not accepted by the people to be their queen and is hence driven out of the kingdom. Ganapati also loses the trust and support of his people because of this. Murari and Hari Hara take this chance to launch a coup using the secret passageway. They then proclaim that they will rule Oragallu in Mahadeva's name, while maintaining their own power. Before Murari and Hari Hara can kill Siva Devayya, he has a heart attack and dies.

It doesn't take too long for the people to realize that who deserves to rule the kingdom, as Murari and Hari Hara start to prosecute them with higher tax rates and unprecedented cruelty and aristocracy soon after they take power. The desperate people, along with Siva Devayya (who faked his death), then turn to Rudramadevi to apologize and for help. Rudramadevi then forms these people as an opposition army to fight against her own kingdom's army.

Rudramadevi and her army meet Gona Ganna Reddy's army on her way, which is surprisingly not about to attack her, but to help her get her crown back. It is revealed that Gona, who noticed Rudramadevi was a girl in their childhood, is not a traitor but a most loyal warrior of the kingdom. He had already expected that Rudramadevi would lose her power and be driven out of the kingdom one day, so he left the palace, pretending to be driven out for being a traitor, to form his own army to wait for the day.

After they join hands, their united army is greater and stronger than that of Murari and Hari Hara and beats the latter. They also repel and defeat the Devagiri Empire. Rudramadevi then gets her crown back, marries Chalukya and becomes the first queen of South India.

== Cast ==
- Anushka Shetty as Princess Rudrama Devi alias Prince Rudradeva Maharaja, princess of the Kakatiya Empire, and later, the first queen in South Indian history; empress of Orugallu.
  - Ulka Gupta as Young Rudrama Devi, aged 14
  - Medha as Young Rudrama Devi, aged 9
- Allu Arjun as Gona Ganna Reddy a prince acts as rebel to Kakatiya Empire; who makes a huge army to support of Rudrama Devi for the battle Mahadeva Nayakudu. Later gains back his thrown Vardhamanapuram from his paternal uncle Gona Lakuma Reddy with the support of Rudrama Devi and remains a loyal Samanta to her.
  - Vikram Lagadapati as Young Gona Ganna Reddy
- Rana Daggubati as Prince Chalukya Veerabhadra; ruler of Niravadyapuram; Rudrama Devi's love interest later husband; a loyal Samanta to Kakatiya Empire.
  - Roshan Meka as Young Chalukya Veerabhadra
- Vikramjeet Virk as King Mahadeva Nayakudu; who dreams to conquer Orugallu
  - Yashwanth as Young Mahadeva Nayakudu
- Nithya Menen as Muktamba; wife of Rudra Deva to world, after revelation she became most trusted friend to Rudrama Devi.
- Catherine Tresa as Anambika; Gona Ganna Reddy's love interest later wife.
- Krishnam Raju as King Ganapatideva; father to Rudrama Devi
- Prakash Raj as Prime Minister Siva Devayya; an intelligent and loyal to Kakatiya Dynasty
- Suman as Hari Hara Devudu; a cunning Samanta wants to take over Orugallu.
- Adithya as Murari Devudu; younger brother of Hari Hara Devudu
- Prabha as Somamba, Ganapati Devudu's wife; and Rudrama Devi's mother
- Aditi Chengappa as Ganapamba,younger sister of Rudrama
- Vinod Kumar Alva as Gona Lakuma Reddy; Ganna Reddy's cunning paternal uncle who rebels against Kakatiya Empire.
- Raja Ravindra as Kotareddy, Anambika's father
- Hamsa Nandini as Madanika, a spy to Mahadeva Nayakudu.
- Ajay as Prasadaditya, Loyal Commander in Chief of Kakatiya Empire.
- Baba Sehgal as Naga Devudu; trusted henchman of Hari Hara Devudu.
- Raza Murad as Simhana, King of Devagiri
- Jaya Prakash Reddy as Amba Devudu, a cunning Samanta to Kakatiya Empire
- Subbaraya Sharma as Jayapa Naidu, a loyal Samanta to Kakatiya Empire
- Venu Madhav as Tittibi
- Vennela Kishore as Manchana, an associate of Tittibi
- Arpit Ranka as Varada Reddy
- Akshara Mandhapati as Akshara Devi
- Krishna Bhagavaan as Somberi, Murari and Hari Hara's aide
- G. V. Sudhakar Naidu as Uppala Somudu
- Gary Tantony as Marco Polo

Vijayakumar, Uttej, Sivaji Raja, Sana and Raksha make special appearances in the song "Matthagajame".

=== Family Tree ===
Kakatiya Empire

King Ganapatideva	Somamba Devi
Rudhramadevi	Chalukya Veerabhadra	Ganapamba

== Production ==
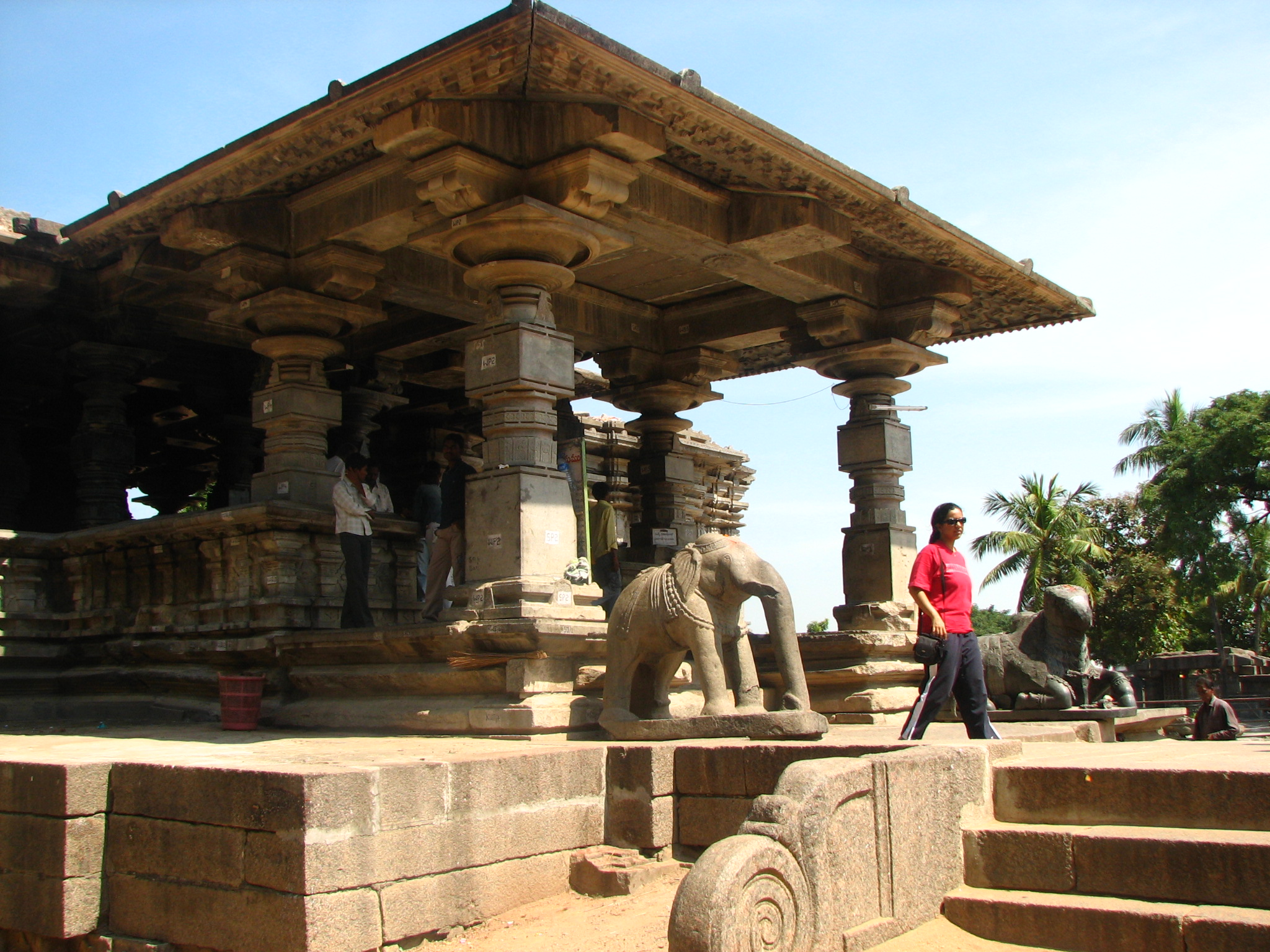
Thousand Pillar Temple where the filming commenced.

Director Gunasekhar readied a script based on the life of Rani Rudramadevi. Gunasekhar selected Ilaiyaraja to compose the music and Thotta Tharani for art direction. Mahesh Babu and Jr. NTR were first approached for the role of Gona Ganna Reddy, but both of them rejected the offer. Later, Allu Arjun was eventually selected to do the role. Neeta Lulla designed the costumes. Rapper Baba Sehgal was hired by director Gunasekhar for a role. Vikramjeet Virk, who earlier played a negative role in Ashutosh Gowarikar's Khelein Hum Jee Jaan Sey (2010) and in Puri Jagannadh's 2014 film Heart Attack, was selected to play a negative character named Mahadeva Nayakadu.

The filming was started on 14 February 2013 in Warangal. The first shot was shot at the Thousand Pillar Temple in Warangal. Final schedule of shoot ended in July 2014.

== Soundtrack ==
The soundtrack album and background score were composed by Ilaiyaraaja. The audio music was planned to release separately in Telangana and Andhra Pradesh states having the Chief ministers of these states as chief guests. The songs were released simultaneously in Visakhapatnam and Warangal on 25 July 2015. Deccan Music named it as the Best Telugu Album of the month. The soundtrack for the Tamil version were released on 15 August 2015 and the Malayalam version was released on 4 September 2015, respectively.

== Release ==
The film's official trailer was released on 2 March 2015. The film was slated to be released on 26 June 2015, but it was but postponed to 9 October due to technical problems. Telangana state has given entertainment tax exemption for the film.

== Legal release online ==
HeroTalkies has legally released Rudhramadevi in 2D and 3D formats to overseas customers who have 3D TVs.

== Reception ==
=== Critical response ===
Upon release, the film received positive reviews, with critics praising the direction, narration, and Anushka's performance. Belvoir Eagle gave the film 3.5/5 rating, and Kiaara Sindu of The Hans India rated 4/5.

=== Box office ===
It grossed ₹32 crore (US$3.3 million) in its first weekend at the domestic box office, and turned out to be a success. The film grossed ₹84 crore worldwide.

== Accolades ==
Award (Note: Awards are in alphabetical order.)	Date of ceremony (Note: Date is linked to the article about the awards held that year, wherever possible.)	Category	Recipient(s)	Result	Ref.
CineMAA Awards	12 June 2016	Best Actress	Anushka Shetty	Won	
CineMAA Awards	12 June 2016	Best Actor – Jury	Allu Arjun	Won	
CineMAA Awards	12 June 2016	Special Appreciation Award	Gunasekhar	Won	
Filmfare Awards South	18 June 2016	Best Actress – Telugu	Anushka Shetty	Won	
Filmfare Awards South	18 June 2016	Best Supporting Actor – Telugu	Allu Arjun	Won	
IIFA Utsavam	28 – 29 March 2017	Best Actress – Telugu	Anushka Shetty	Nominated	
IIFA Utsavam	28 – 29 March 2017	Best Supporting Actor – Telugu	Allu Arjun	Won	
IIFA Utsavam	28 – 29 March 2017	Best Supporting Actress – Telugu	Nithya Menen	Nominated	
IIFA Utsavam	28 – 29 March 2017	Best Performance in a Negative Role – Telugu	Vikramjeet Virk	Nominated	
IIFA Utsavam	28 – 29 March 2017	Best Lyricist – Telugu	Sirivennela Seetharama Sastry for ("Matthagajame")	Nominated	
IIFA Utsavam	28 – 29 March 2017	Best Male Playback Singer – Telugu	Hariharan for ("Aunka Neevena")	Nominated	
IIFA Utsavam	28 – 29 March 2017	Best Female Playback Singer – Telugu	Shreya Ghoshal for ("Punnami Puvvai")	Nominated	
Mirchi Music Awards South	27 July 2016	Female Vocalist of the Year	Shreya Ghoshal for ("Punnami Puvvai")	Nominated	
Nandi Awards	14 November 2017	Best Character Actor	Allu Arjun	Won	
Nandi Awards	14 November 2017	Best Female Dubbing Artist	Sowmya Sharma	Won	
Santosham Film Awards	14 August 2016	Best Film	Rudhramadevi – Gunasekhar	Won	
Santosham Film Awards	14 August 2016	Best Actress	Anushka Shetty	Won	
South Indian International Movie Awards	30 June – 1 July 2016	Best Film – Telugu	Rudhramadevi – Gunasekhar	Nominated	
South Indian International Movie Awards	30 June – 1 July 2016	Best Director – Telugu	Gunasekhar	Nominated	
South Indian International Movie Awards	30 June – 1 July 2016	Best Actor – Telugu	Allu Arjun	Nominated	
South Indian International Movie Awards	30 June – 1 July 2016	Critics Choice Best Actor – Telugu	Allu Arjun	Won	
South Indian International Movie Awards	30 June – 1 July 2016	Best Actress – Telugu	Anushka Shetty	Nominated	
South Indian International Movie Awards	30 June – 1 July 2016	Critics Choice Best Actress – Telugu	Anushka Shetty	Won	
South Indian International Movie Awards	30 June – 1 July 2016	Best Supporting Actress – Telugu	Nithya Menen	Nominated	

== Legacy ==
Rudhramadevi is the first Telugu film to have its recording in London, United Kingdom. The garments and jewellery designed for the lead cast are available in NAC Jewellers in Chennai as Rudhramadevi Collections.
