= Lakshmana rekha =

Line in the soil drawn by Lakshmana

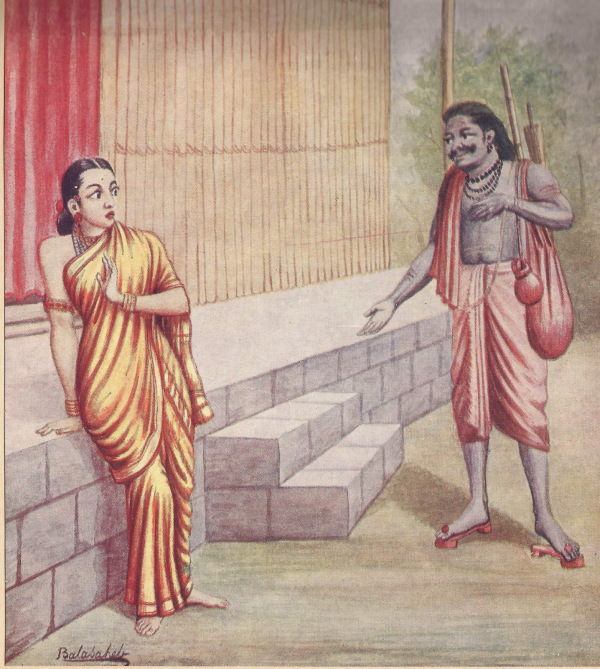
Ravana approaches Sita in the garb of mendicant

Lakshmana Rekha (Sanskrit: लक्ष्मण रेखा), in some later versions of the Hindu epic Ramayana, is a line in the soil drawn by Lakshmana. This line is drawn around the cottage and dwelling in the forest that he shared with his elder brother, Rama, and Rama's wife, Sita. The line is meant to protect Sita, while he was away searching for Rama. This line is not featured in the original epic by Valmiki.

In the story, Rama goes chasing a golden deer (which is actually the rakshasa Maricha in disguise), and does not return for a long time. When Sita beseeches Lakshmana to depart in search of his brother, the prince, who could not bear to see Sita cry in grief, reluctantly decides to go and search for Rama. However, before leaving he uses his divine powers and draws this protective line around the cottage. This is subject to his condition that Sita not cross the protective line that he draws around the dwelling. According to this legend, anybody other than Rama, Sita, and himself who attempted to cross the line with any kind of malicious intent would face severe divine resistance from the line and it will be impossible to cross it. Once Lakshmana leaves in search of Rama, the rakshasa king, Ravana, arrives on the site in the form of a mendicant, and asks Sita for alms. Sita goes inside and Ravana tries to enter the cottage but is immediately stopped by the divine power of the line and realizes that it is impossible for him to enter forcefully. He then tricks Sita into crossing the line and, not suspecting the ploy, Sita crosses the Lakshmana Rekha to provide alms to him. Ravana promptly abducts her and flies her to Lanka upon his Pushpaka Vimana.

The Ramacharitamanas, the popular north Indian rendering of the story of Rama, does not feature the Lakshmana Rekha story in the Aranya Kanda. However, in the Lanka Kanda of the Ramcharitmanas, (35.1) Ravana's wife Mandodari rebukes him on his boisterous claims of valour by hinting that his claims of strength and valour are shallow, for he could not even cross a small line drawn by Rama's younger brother, Lakshmana.

The Radhey Shyam Ramayana mentions that the crossing of Lakshamana Rekha by Sita was done absent-mindedly by an anxious Sita only to honour the Indian tradition of Atithi Devo Bhava : guests are to be accorded the respect of God himself. Sita crosses the boundary only to give alms to Ravana once he insists that the alms cannot be accepted across a barrier as crossing it was against the principle of the free will of the donor.

In local tradition, the line is believed to have been drawn at Panchavati, in the forest of Dandakaranya, which is now part of the city of Nashik in Maharashtra.

== Modern use ==
Lakshmana Rekha, in modern Indian parlance, refers to a strict convention or a rule, never to be broken. See the American Bright-line rule. It often refers to the ethical limits of an action, traversing which may lead to undesirable consequences. Example of use:

Constitution is very clear on the roles of the Judiciary and the Legislature, Lok Sabha Speaker Somnath Chatterjee said; both should not cross the Lakshman Rekha.

== See also ==
- Aranya Kanda
