= Annasagar, Bhoothpur =

Village in Mahabubnagar district, Telangana, India

Annasagar
- Village
- Location in Telangana, India Annasagar (India)
- Coordinates: 17.85°N 78.78°E
- Country: India
- State: Telangana
- District: Mahabubnagar

Languages
  - Official: Telugu
- Time zone: UTC+5:30 (IST)

Annasagar is a village in the Bhoothpur mandal, Mahabubnagar district, Telangana, India. As of the 2011 Census of India, it had a population of 2,421 across 550 households. There were 1,236 males and 1,185 females. 311 were 6 years old or under. 1,199 were literate.
