= Araṇya-Kāṇḍa =

Third book of the Ramayana

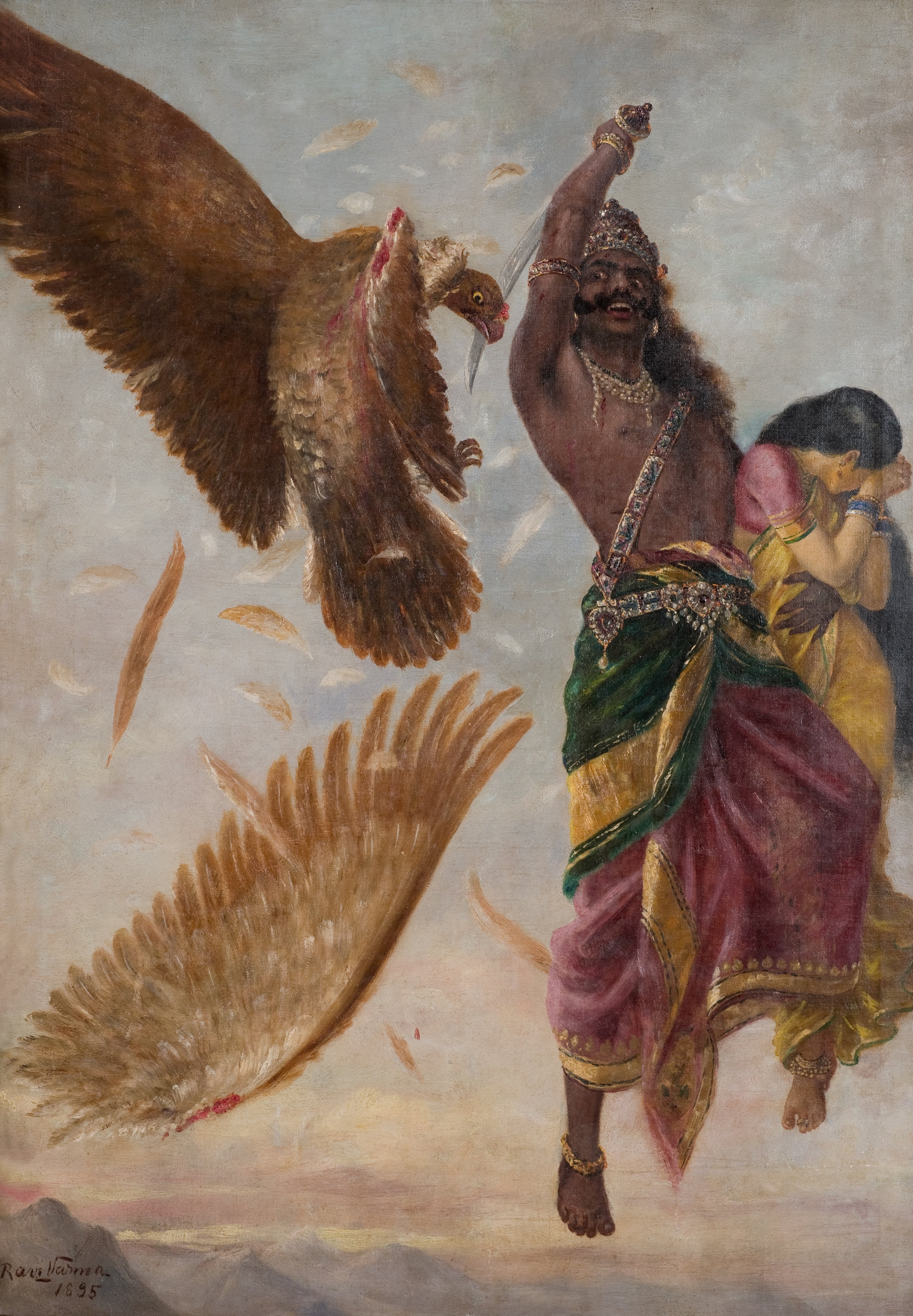
- Ravana fights Jatayu as he carries off the kidnapped Sita, Painting by Raja Ravi Varma.

Information
- Religion: Hinduism
- Author: Valmiki
- Language: Sanskrit

Araṇya-Kāṇḍa, or The Forest Episode, is the third book of the epic poem of Ramayana. It is also found in the Rāmcharitmānas. It follows the legend of Rama through his fourteen-year exile in the forest, joined by his wife and his brother. Rama overcomes challenges and demons by upholding standards of behavior. Nearing the end of his exile, Rama's wife Sita is kidnapped by the king Ravana, and Rama learns what happened. The story continues in the next book, Kiśkindhā Kāṇḍa.

== Background ==
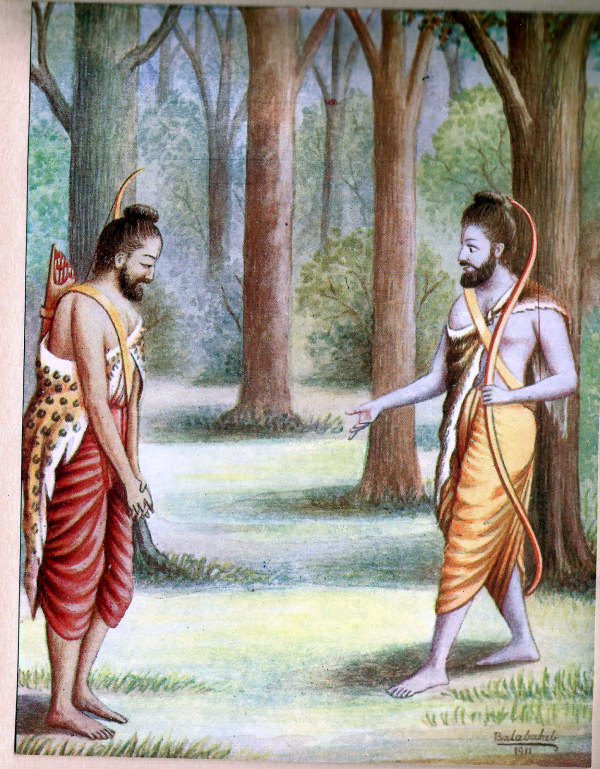
Admonishing of Lakshmana

Rāmcaritmānas (an epic poem) was written by Tulsidas in 1574. In verse 1.33.2 of Bālkānd, the first chapter of Rāmcaritmānas, Tulsidas mentions 1631 as the date according to Vikram Samvat's calendar, which is 1574 in the Gregorian calendar or Common Era(CE). A composition of Avadhi dialect, the Rāmcaritmānas belonged to the saguna form of the Bhakti movement(also called Bhakti kāl or devotional period). Tulsidas, Kabir, Mirabai and Surdas are the greatest devotional poets of Bhakti kāl in Hindi literature.

Inspired by the Valmiki Rāmāyana, the Rāmcaritmānas of Tulsidas is a poem in vernacular Avadhi language, spoken throughout large parts of North India. The masterpiece of vernacular renaissance challenged the dominance of high-class Brahmanical Sanskrit, echoing the revolt of Buddha against Brahmanical elitism.

== The Ninefold Devotion ==
Rama tells Shabari the Ninefold devotion, which he asks her to listen with caution and keep in mind. The first devotion is the company of righteous. The second is love for my legends. Serving Guru's lotus feet without ego is the third devotion. The fourth devotion is guileless singing of my qualities. Recitation of mantras and firm faith in me is the fifth devotion that is enlightened by the Vedas. The sixth devotion is being well-mannered, detachment from various Karma and conscientious persistence in goodness. The seventh devotion is seeing me pervading the whole world without prejudice and regarding righteous even above Me. The eighth devotion is contentment in what one gets and even in dreams not to see fault in others. The ninth devotion is simplicity, guileless behaviour towards all and trust in me without joy or sorrow in heart. Out of nine even one who has that woman or man is extremely dear to me.

Rama tells Shabari that all types of devotion are firm in you. Rare even to groups of Yogis that state today is available to you. The fruits of my visit are transcendental, a creature attains its natural state. Sita's whereabouts, O dear! If you know, say to me, O beautiful! Go to river Pampa, Rama, there will happen Sugriva's friendship. He will say everything. Rama, you know but still ask, O omniscient! Again and Again she bowed before Rama. With love she narrated the entire story. After telling the entire story, seeing Rama’s face, she kept the lotus feet of Rama in her heart. Burning her body by the fire of Yoga, she became rapt in Rama's feet, a place of no return. O human! Various Karma, misdeeds and beliefs, are sorrowful, reject all. Having faith, says Tulsidas, adore Rama's feet. Belonging to lower caste, a birthplace of sins, Rama gave Moksha to even such woman. O stupid mind! You want happiness after leaving such lord?

== Journey to Pampa River ==
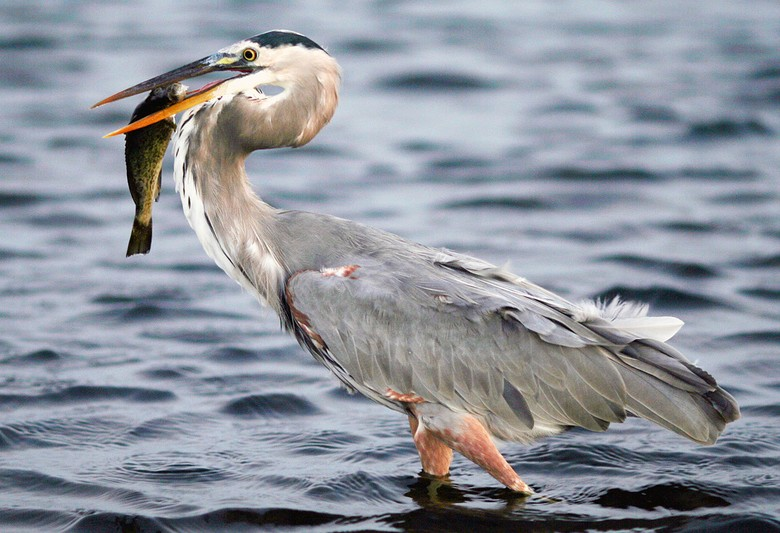
Herons are likened to camels of the Cupid's army.

Leaving even that forest, proceeded Rama. Incomparable in strength, both are lions in human form. Like a lover parted from his love, Rama regret, relating tales and many anecdotes. O Laxmana! Behold the beauty of the forest. After seeing whose mind will not be charmed? With their females are all birds and animals. As if to taunt me. Seeing us all-male deers fly. Female deers say you have nothing to fear. Being common you be glad. In search of golden deers, they have come. Male elephants bring females closer to them. As if to advice. Scripture, though well-studied, should be reviewed again and again. King, though well-served, should not be considered under control. You may have a woman in your heart. But young lady, scripture, and king are under no control. See brother, the charming spring season. Without beloved, it breeds fear in me. Knowing me in love agony, powerless, and all alone, as if, the Cupid attacked with forest, honey bees, and birds. When his agent saw that I am with my brother, he then camped with his army.

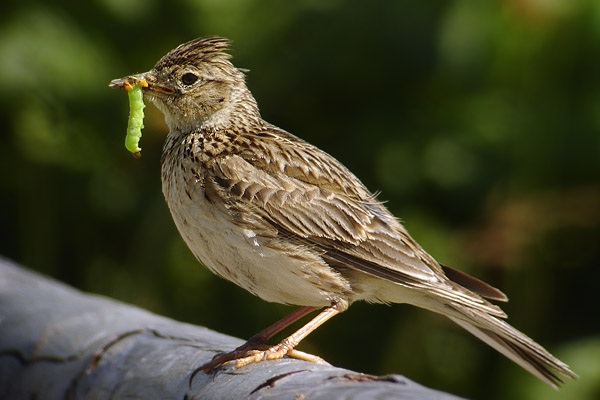
Skylarks are various bands singing praises.

Tall trees are tangled with creepers. Like various types of tents are tied. Banana and palm trees are like beautiful flags and banners. The sight doesn't enchant only a calm mind. In various ways are trees in blossom. Like archers are dressed in various uniforms. A lot of beautiful trees are spread. Like soldiers are spread apart. Calling cuckoos are like crying elephants. Herons and rooks are camels and mules. Peacocks, Chakoras and parrots are fine horses. Pigeons and swans are all Arabian horses. Partridges and quails are infantry. Beyond words is Cupid's army. Hills are chariots. Chariots are hills and drums are falls. Skylarks are various bands singing praises. Hum of honeybees is trumpet and shehnai. Cool, the faint and fragrant breeze is an agent. Leading his mighty army, the Cupid wanders challenging all. Laxmana seeing this Cupid's army who remain calm them the world honors. He has one greatest force – woman. Who recovers from that warrior is greatest.

O, Brother! Three are the most powerful devils – lust, anger, and greed. They instantly delude the minds of even sages who are the seats of wisdom. Greed has the weapon of desire and arrogance. Lust has only woman. Anger has the weapon of harsh statements. Such is the opinion of great sages. Beyond nature, the lord of all, Rama, O Uma, is omniscient. To the lustful, he showed humiliation. To the minds of the calm he made firm

== Notes & References ==
Notes

Online Sources

- Tulsidas, Goswami. "Aranyakand" (in Awadhi and Hindi). Indore, India: Webdunia.com.

== Bibliography ==
- Ascher, William; Heffron, John M. (15 November 2010). Cultural Change and Persistence: New Perspectives on Development. Palgrave Macmillan. ISBN 978-0-230-11733-4.
- Agarwal, Mirgandra (1 January 2005). Philosophy of Inspiration. Sterling Publishers Pvt. Ltd. ISBN 978-1-84557-280-8.
- Bakker, Freek L. (2009). The Challenge of the Silver Screen: An Analysis of the Cinematic Portraits of Jesus, Rama, Buddha and Muhammad. BRILL. ISBN 978-90-04-16861-9.
- Bulcke, Camille; Prasāda, Dineśvara (2010). Rāmakathā and Other Essays. Vani Prakashan. ISBN 978-93-5000-107-3.
- Callewaert, Winand M. (1 January 2000). Banaras: Vision of a Living Ancient Tradition. Hemkunt Press. ISBN 978-81-7010-302-8.
- Coogan, Michael D. (2003). The Illustrated Guide to World Religions. Oxford University Press. ISBN 978-0-19-521997-5.
- Duiker, William J. (2012-03-02). Cengage Advantage Books: World History, Complete (7th ed.). Cengage Learning. ISBN 978-1-133-71009-7.
- Ghosh, Amitav (2002). The Imam and the Indian: Prose Pieces. Orient Blackswan. ISBN 978-81-7530-047-7.
- Gupta, Kulwant Rai; Gupta, Amita (1 January 2006). Concise Encyclopaedia Of India. Atlantic Publishers & Dist. ISBN 978-81-269-0637-6.
- Jones, Constance; Ryan, James D. (2006). Encyclopedia of Hinduism. Infobase Publishing. ISBN 978-0-8160-7564-5.
- Kumar, A. (1 January 2001). Social Transformation In Modern India. Sarup & Sons. ISBN 978-81-7625-227-0.
- Lamb, Ramdas (29 August 2002). Rapt in the Name: The Ramnamis, Ramnam, and Untouchable Religion in Central India. SUNY Press. ISBN 978-0-7914-5385-8.
- Lele, Jayant (1981). Tradition and Modernity in Bhakti Movements. Brill Archive. ISBN 978-90-04-06370-9.
- Lochtefeld, James G. (2002). The Illustrated Encyclopedia of Hinduism: N-Z. The Rosen Publishing Group. p. 713. ISBN 978-0-8239-3180-4.
- Lorenzen, David N. (1995). Bhakti Religion in North India: Community Identity and Political Action. SUNY Press. ISBN 978-0-7914-2025-6.
- Lutgendorf, Philip (13 December 2006). Hanuman's Tale: The Messages of a Divine Monkey. Oxford University Press. ISBN 978-0-19-988582-4.
- MacFie, J. M. (1 May 2004). The Ramayan Of Tulsidas Or The Bible Of Northern India. Kessinger Publishing. ISBN 978-1-4179-1498-2.
- Mathew, Kirpal Singh, Annie. Frank Middle School Social Sciences Class VII. Frank Brothers. ISBN 978-81-8409-102-1.
- Mathur, Suresh Narain; Chaturvedi, B. K. (2005). The Diamond Book of Hindu Gods and Goddesses. Diamond Pocket Books (P) Ltd. ISBN 978-81-288-0802-9.
- McLean, Malcolm (1998). Devoted to the Goddess: The Life and Work of Ramprasad. SUNY Press. ISBN 978-0-7914-3689-9.
- Mehta, Jarava Lal (January 1992). J.L. Mehta on Heidegger, Hermeneutics, and Indian Tradition. BRILL. ISBN 978-90-04-09488-8.
- Melton, J. Gordon (13 September 2011). Religious Celebrations: An Encyclopedia of Holidays, Festivals, Solemn Observances, and Spiritual Commemorations. ABC-CLIO. ISBN 978-1-59884-205-0.
- Miller, Kevin Christopher (2008). A Community of Sentiment: Indo-Fijian Music and Identity Discourse in Fiji and Its Diaspora. ISBN 978-0-549-72404-9.
- Pillai, Poornima; Bharti, Jyotsna (2005). Gateway to Indian Classical Literature. Asiapac Books Pte Ltd. ISBN 978-981-229-427-2.
- Pinch, William R. (17 March 2006). Warrior Ascetics and Indian Empires. Cambridge University Press. ISBN 978-0-521-85168-8.
- Puri, B.N.; Das, M.N. (1 December 2003). A Comprehensive History of India: Comprehensive history of medieval India. Sterling Publishers Pvt. Ltd. ISBN 978-81-207-2508-9.
- Quinn, Edward (1 January 2009). Critical Companion to George Orwell. Infobase Publishing. ISBN 978-1-4381-0873-5.
- Rajagopal, Arvind (25 January 2001). Politics After Television: Hindu Nationalism and the Reshaping of the Public in India. Cambridge University Press. ISBN 978-0-521-64839-4.
- Richman, Paula (1 January 2001). Questioning Ramayanas: A South Asian Tradition. University of California Press. ISBN 978-0-520-22074-4.
- Sadarangani, Neeti M. (2004). Bhakti Poetry in Medieval India: Its Inception, Cultural Encounter and Impact. Sarup & Sons. ISBN 978-81-7625-436-6.
- Saraswati, Prakashanand (1 January 2001). The True History and the Religion of India: A Concise Encyclopedia of Authentic Hinduism. Motilal Banarsidass. ISBN 978-81-208-1789-0.
- Singh, Khushwant (1 January 1990). India An Introduction. HarperCollins Publishers. ISBN 978-93-5029-243-3.
- Tulasīdāsa; Subramanian, V. K. (2008). Hymns of Tulsidas. Abhinav Publications. ISBN 978-81-7017-496-7.
- Tulsidas, Goswami (2001) [1574]. "Aranyakand". Shri Ramcharitmanas. 81 (in Awadhi and Hindi) (H.Poddar ed.). Gorakhpur, India: Gita Press. pp. 619–679. ISBN 81-293-0123-7.
- Tulsidas, Goswami (2008) [1574]. "Aranyakand". Shri Ramcharitmanas. 1318 (in Awadhi and English). Gorakhpur, India: Gita Press. pp. 647–710. Archived from the original (pdf) on 2010-02-20.
