= Exile of Rama =

Event in Ramayana

The exile of Rama is an event featured in the Ramayana,. (Note: Exile of Rama begins in the Ayōdhyākānda, or the Book of Ayodhya. the second chapter of the Ramayana, while ends in the Uttarakānda or the Book of Later Events. the last chapter of the epic.) In the epic, Rama is exiled by his father, Dasharatha, under the urging of his stepmother Kaikeyi, accompanied by his wife Sita and half-brother Lakshmana for 14 years.

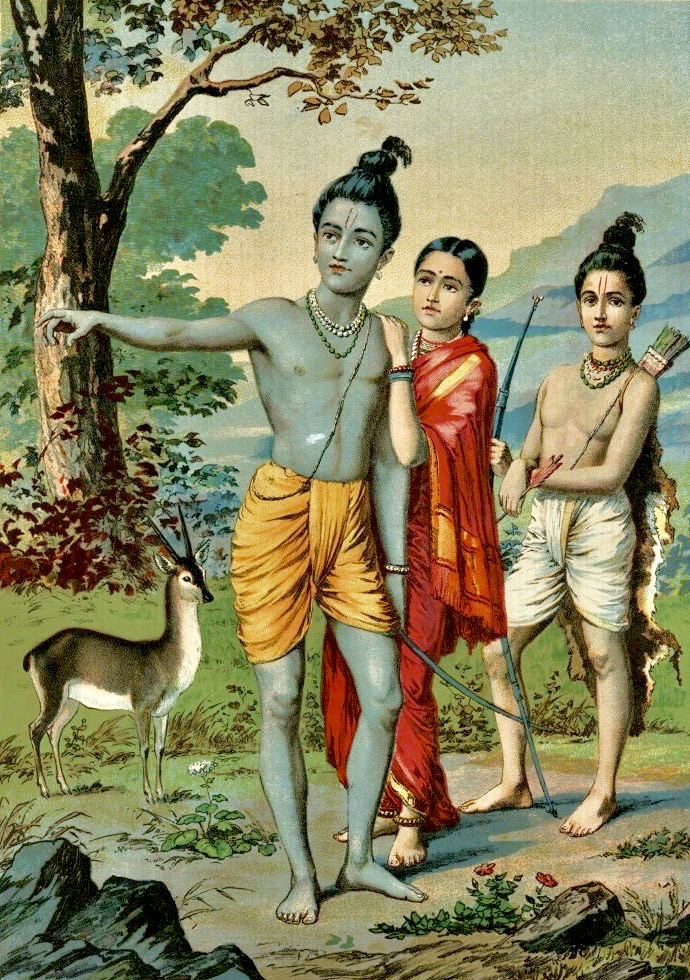
Rama, Sita and Lakshmana in forest.

== Background ==
In the first book of the Ramayana Rama is introduced as the son of the king Daśaratha. Rama was an avatar of the deity Vishnu, who chose to be born as a mortal in order to combat the demon Ravana. Shortly after his marriage to his wife Sītā, Rama is exiled from Ayodhyā for 14 years.

== Abduction of Sita ==
These information come from the Kecak dance, performed at the Uluwatu temple in Bali. The dance tells the story of the kidnapping of Sita by the king Rahwana. The dance is split in 4 scenes.

Scene 1 — Sri Rama (the prince Rama), accompanied by Dewi Sinta (his wife Sinta) and Laksamana, the prince's younger brother, are in the Dandaka forest after Rama's exile by his stepmother. The Golden Deer appears and Sinta asks Rama to catch it. Rama leaves Sinta with Laksamana to look after her, but a scream for help is heard and Sinta urges Laksamana to go help Rama, whom she thinks is the scream from. Laksamana goes despite his brother's instruction and leaves Sinta alone, but not before casting a magic protecting circle around her.

Scene 2 — Sinta left alone, the Giant King Rawhana finds her and, captivated by her beauty, tries to kidnap her, but fails due to the protecting circle. He then transforms into a Baghawan (an old man), and pretend to ask her for water, which she accepts and the king kidnaps her. Sinta's screams are heard by Garuda, a bird deity flying in the sky, and he tries to help her, but Rawhana cuts his wings and he fails.

Scene 3 — Sinta, now in the Alengka Palace laments her fate in the company of Trijata, the king Rawhana's nephew. Hanoman (the White Ape) then appears, and announces he's been sent by Rama and shows Sinta the prince's ring he carries as proof. Sinta then gives him her flower and sends him to Rama with her own message of help. But Hanoman get caught and tied by the King's giants, and almost get burnt alive before escaping using his powers.

Scene 4 — Rahwana learns of this, and confronts Sugriwa, the King of Red Ape, who had come to the Alengka Palace to help Sinta escaping. The two kings fight fiercely. At the right time, Hanoman, Rama, and Laksamana arrive, and with the help of Hanoman's ape army and the magic of Rama's arrow, Rahwana finally falls and die. Sinta and Rama are reunited.

== Time of Composition ==
Scholarly estimates of the composition of the available text range from the 8th–5th to 5th-4th centuries BCE, "although the legends constituting it go back farther in time" and later stages extend to the 3rd century CE. Robert P. Goldman (1984) gives 750 BCE to 500 BCE as the probable date of the oral composition of Valmiki's Ramayana, stating that "it is extremely unlikely that the archetype of the Vālmīki Rāmāyaṇā can be much earlier than the beginning of the seventh century B.C.", while the core portions could not have been composed later than the 6th or 5th century BCE, as the narrative neither mentions Buddhism (founded in the 5th century BCE) nor reflects the later prominence of Magadha (which rose to power in the 7th century BCE). The text also mentions Ayodhya as the capital of Kosala, rather than its later name of Saketa or its successor capital of Shravasti. (Note: (Goldman 1984, p. 21–22): "[I]n the Balakanda, as in the central five books of the epic, the kingdom of Kosala is represented as being at the height of its power and prosperity, governed from a major urban settlement called Ayodhya, [o]nly at the very end of the Uttara-kanda, [the] epilogue to the poem [w]e find reference to Sravasti as a successor capital. [A]s Jacobi also pointed out, the capital city of the unified realm of Kosala is invariably known as Ayodhya in the epic and never by the name Saketa, the name by which it comes to be known in much of the Buddhist and later literature")

== Gallery ==
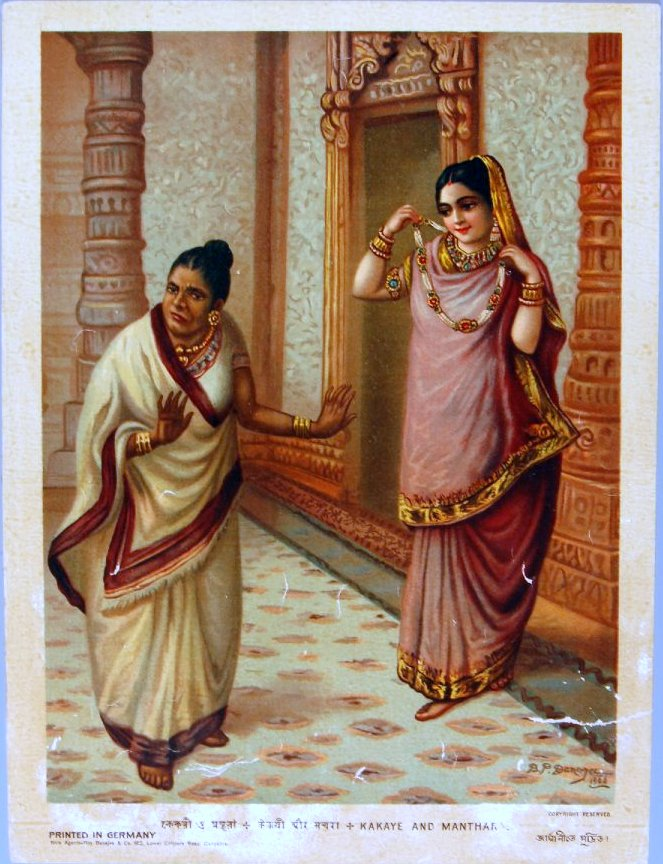
Kaikeyi being provoked by Manthara.

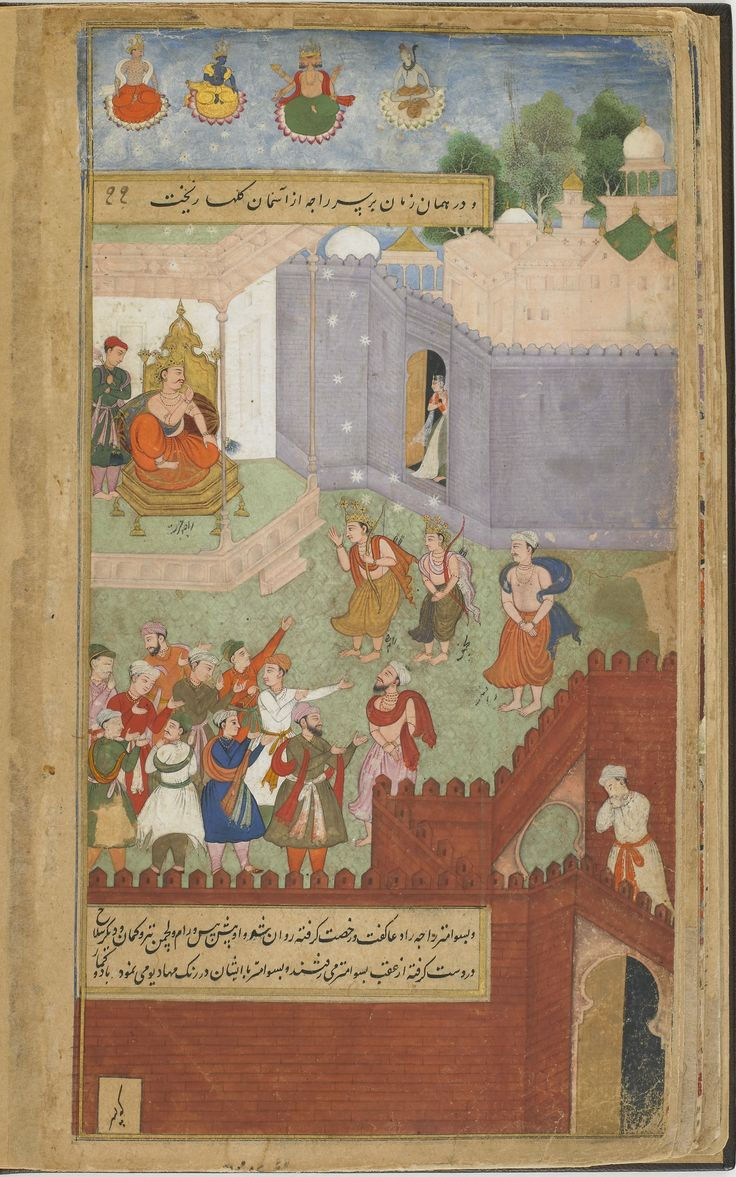
Rama, Lakshmana, and the Vishvamitra take leave of Dasharatha

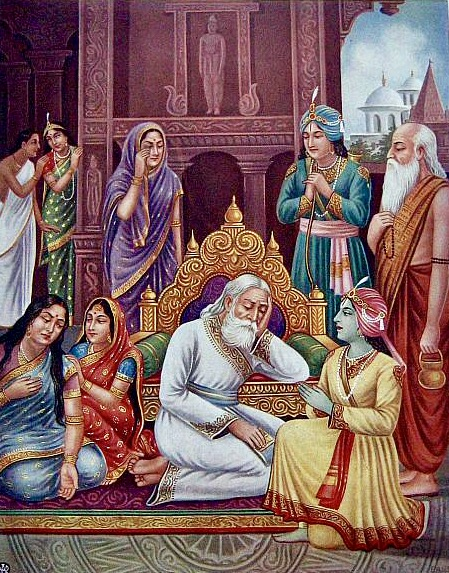
Dashratha grieving upon exile of Rama.

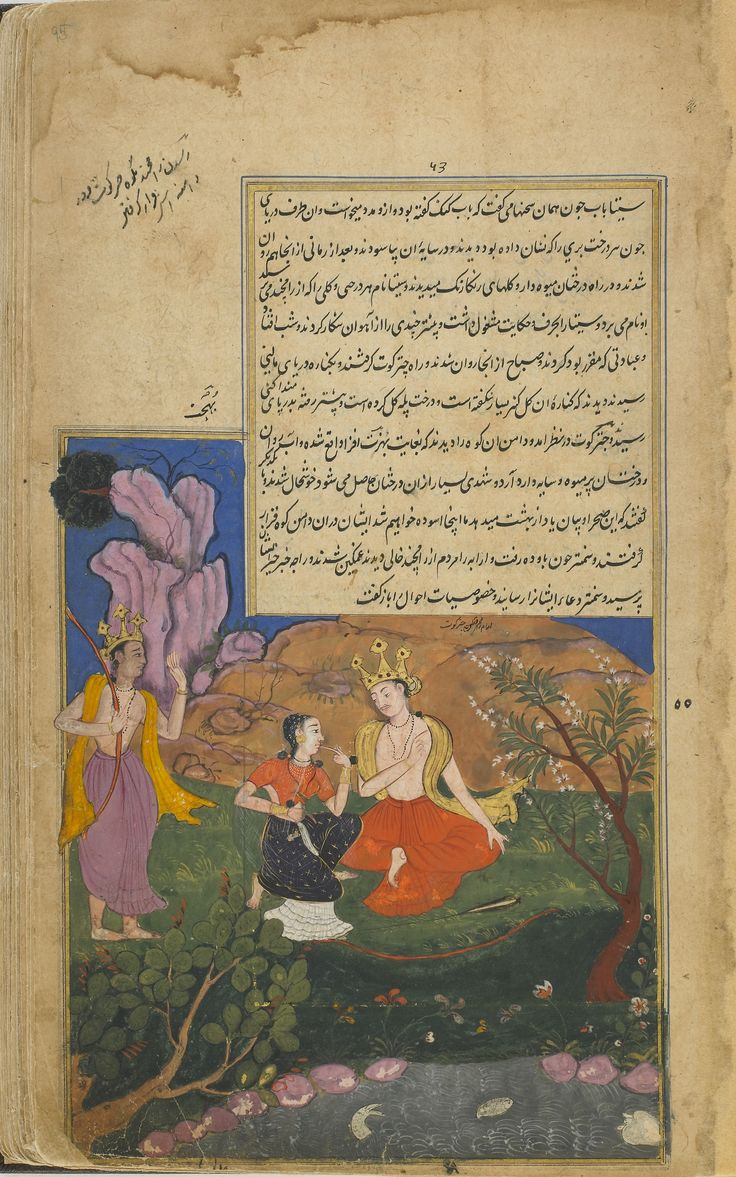
Rama, Lakshmana, and Sita take up residence at the foot of the bounteous Chitrakuta Mountain

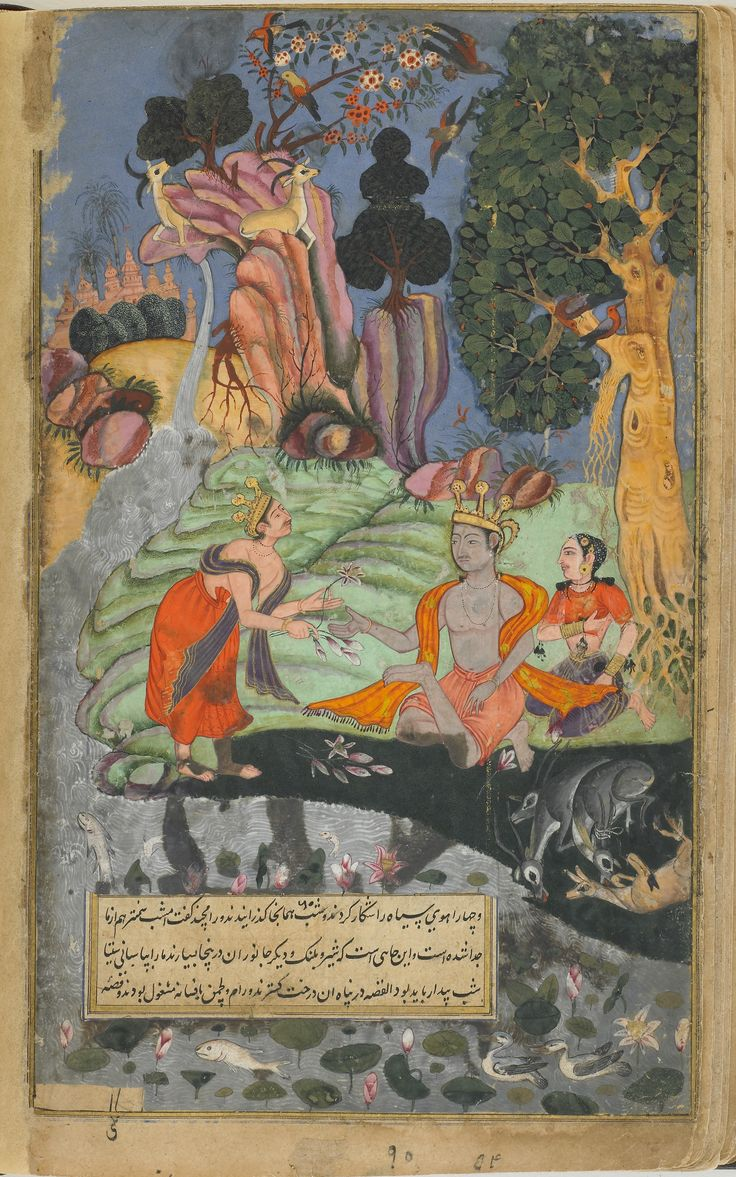
Rama, Lakshmana, and Sita spend their first night alone in the wilderness.

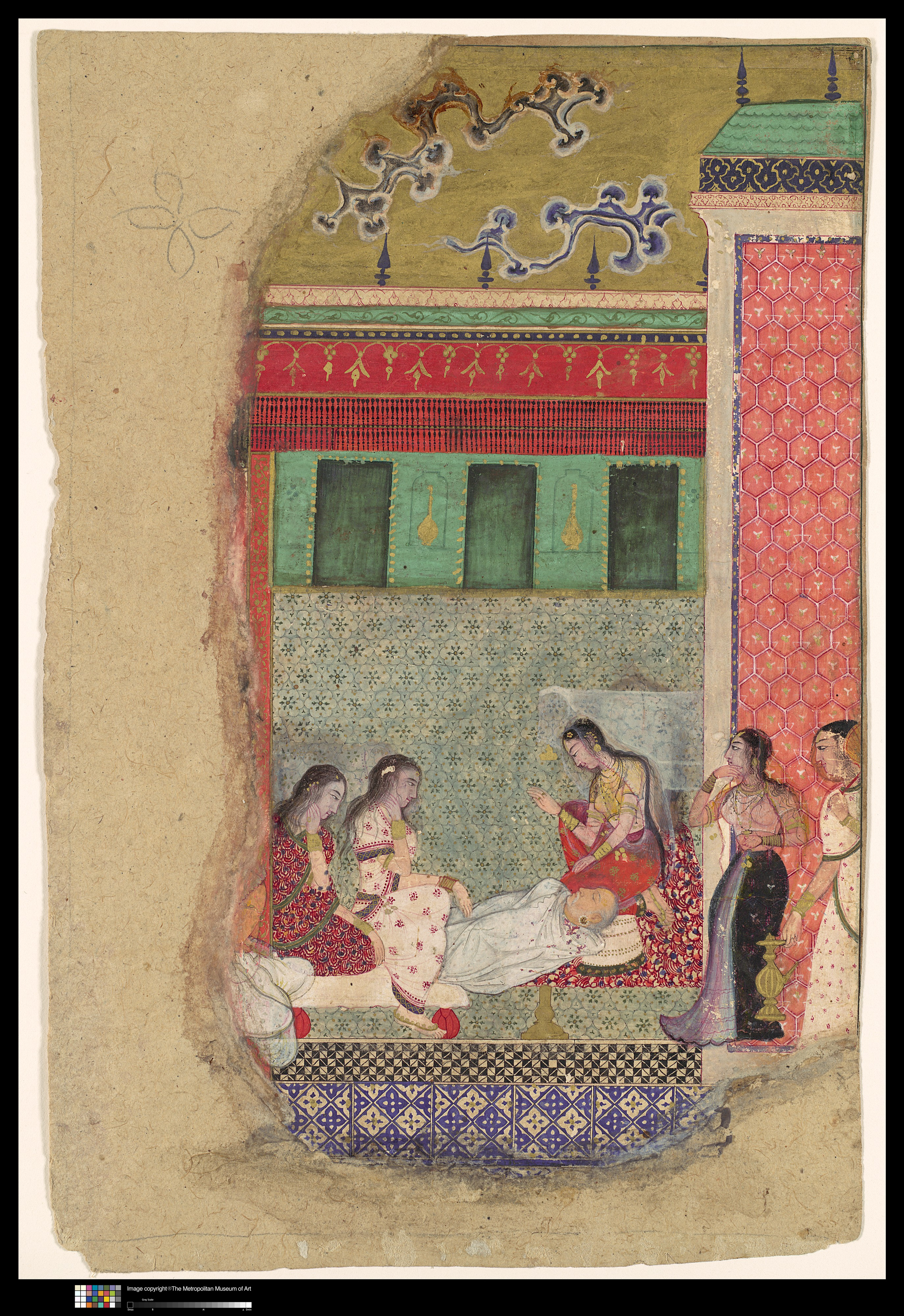
Death of Dasharatha.

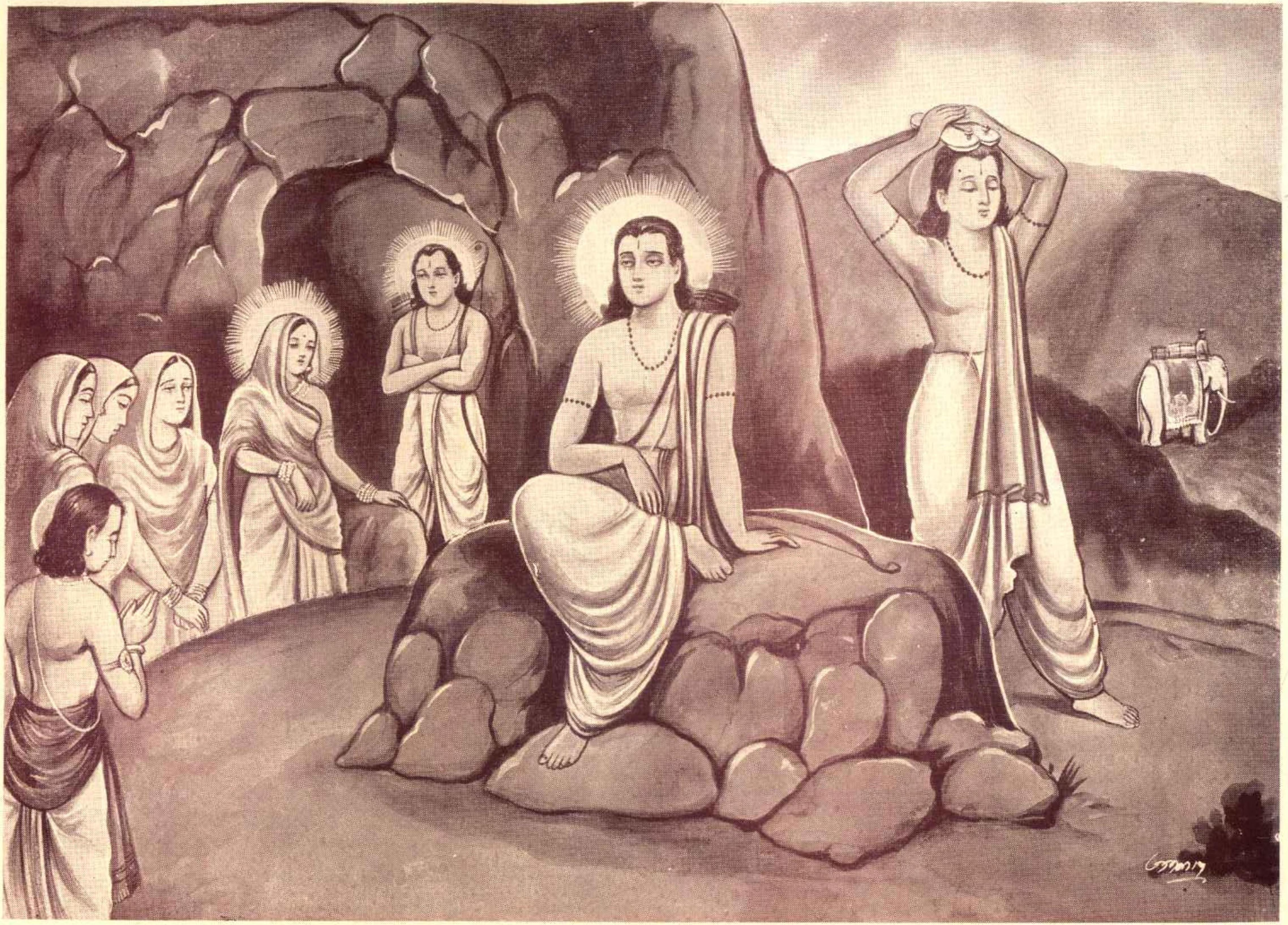
Bharata carries Rama's slippers on his head, in order to make them as representative of Rama, the actual king of Ayodhya.

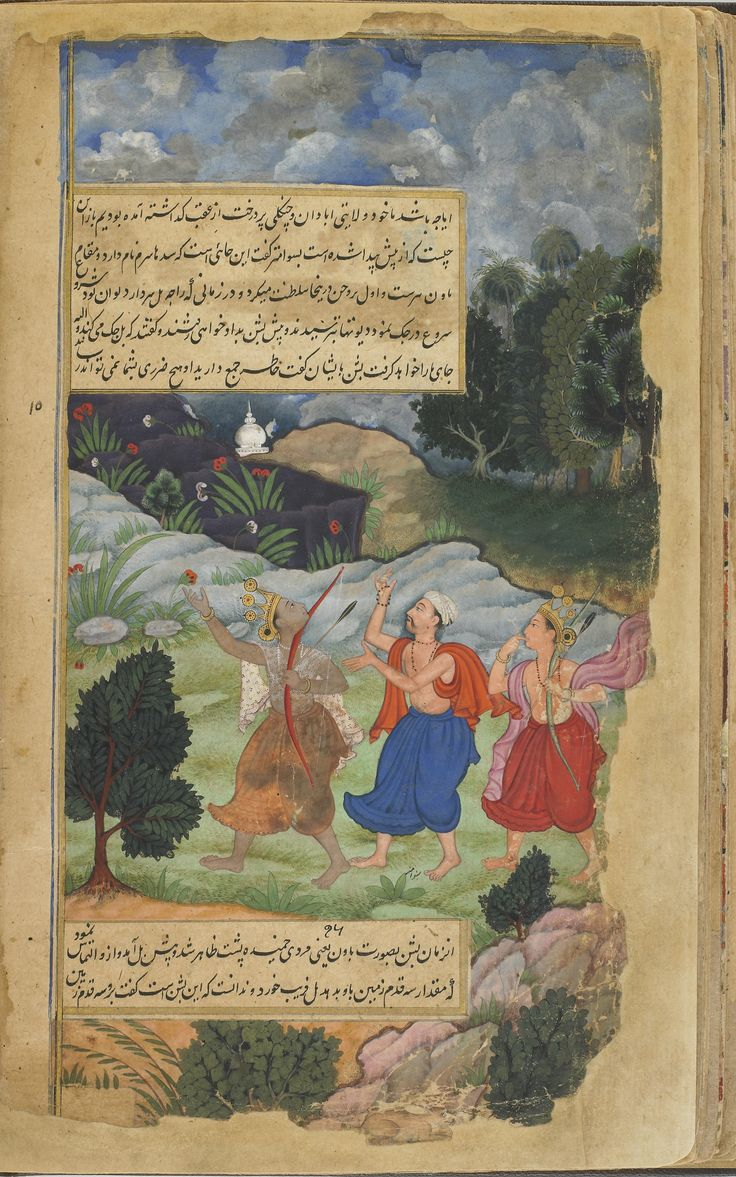
Rama, Vishvamitra, and Lakshmana approach the woods known as siddha ashram

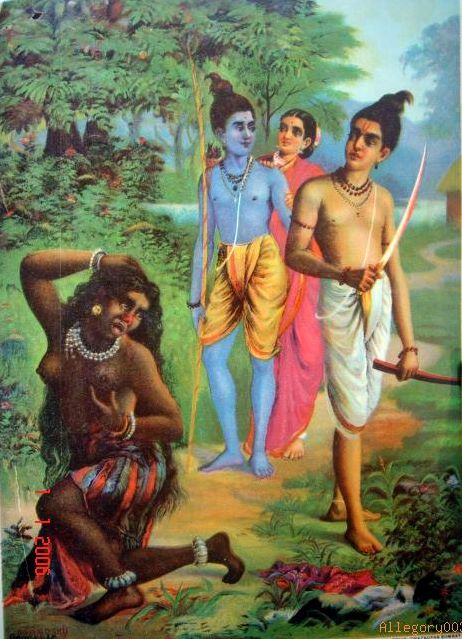
Lakshmana cuts off Shurpanakha's nose.

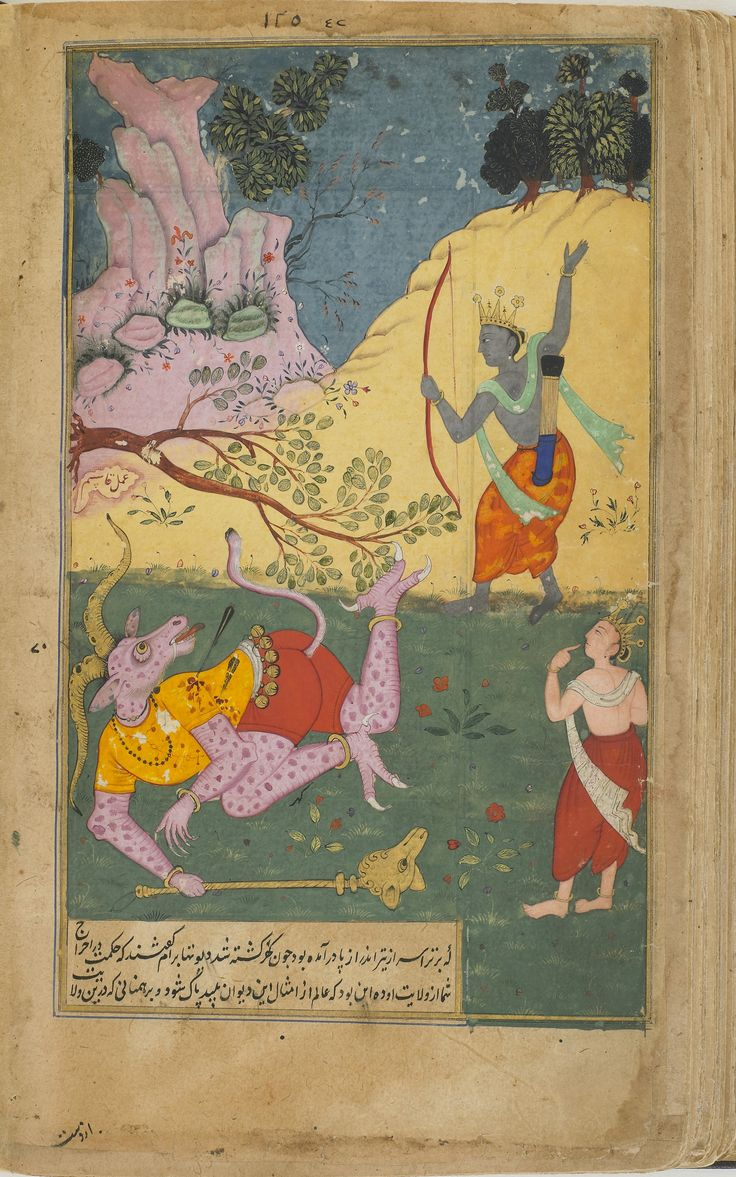
Rama strikes down Khara with an arrow

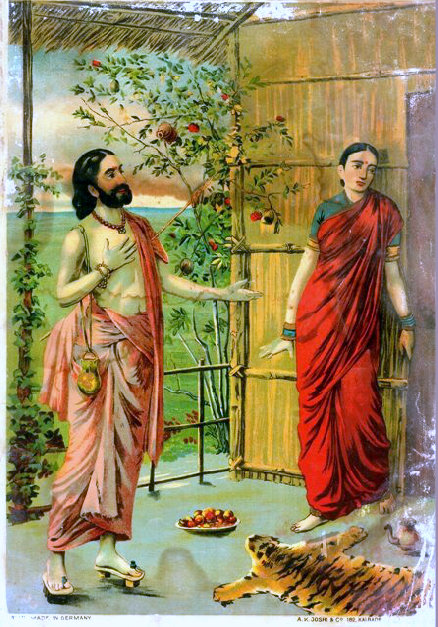
Ravana visits Sita as an ascetic.

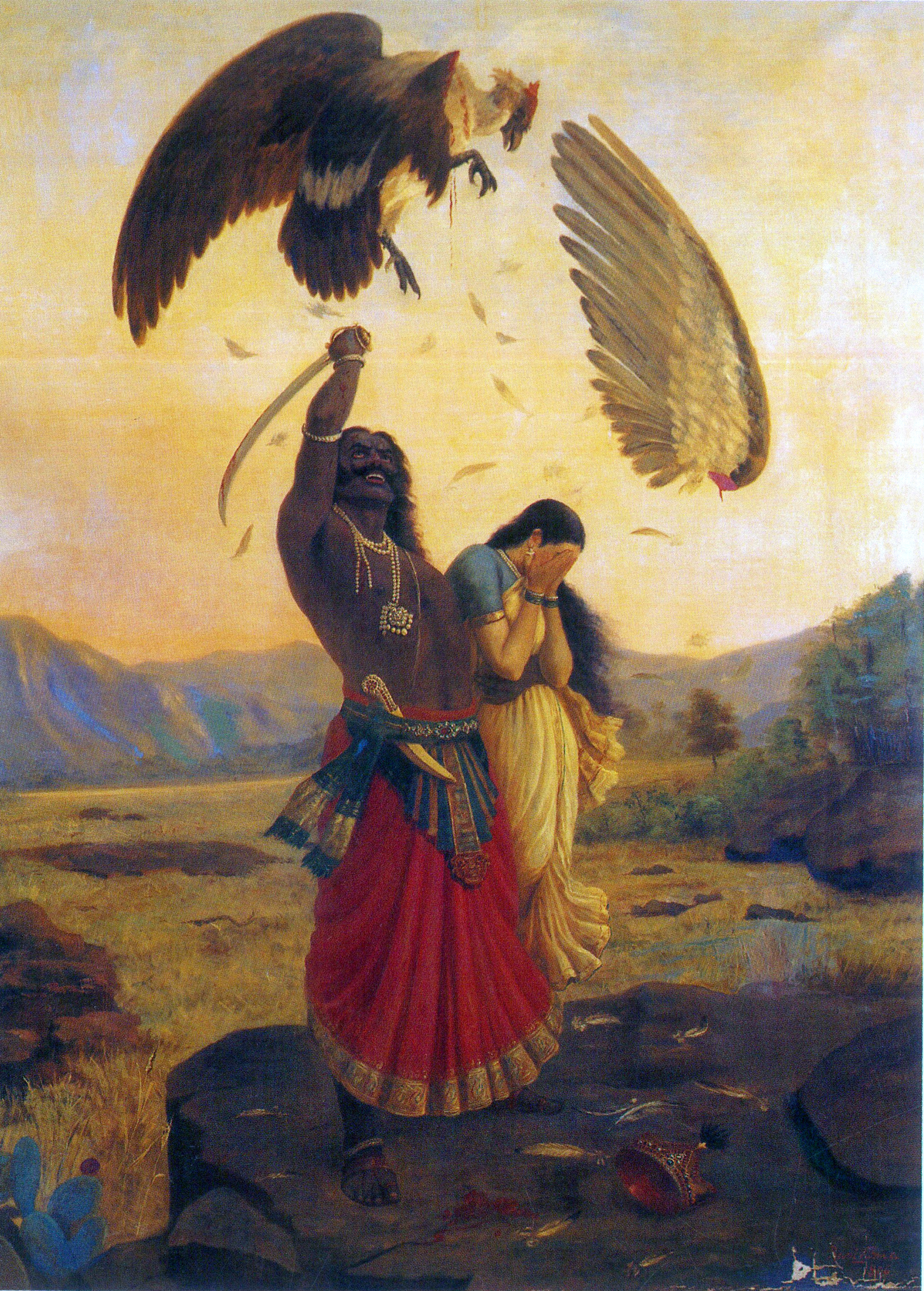
Jatayu killed by Ravana, painting by Raja Ravi Varma.

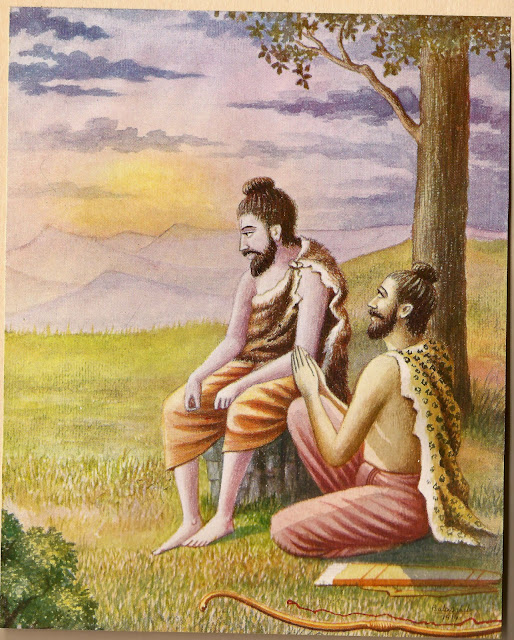
Lakshmana consoled Rama

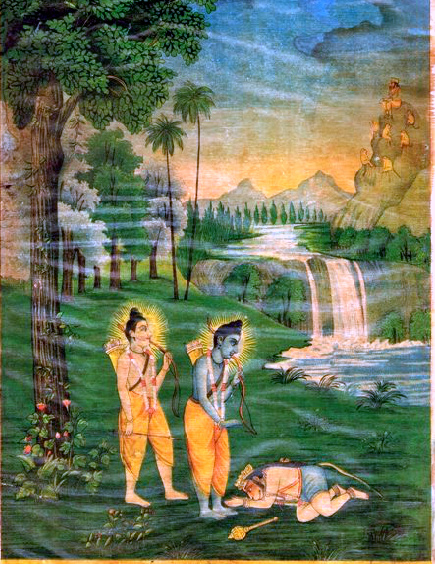
Hanuman meets Rama and Lakshmana.

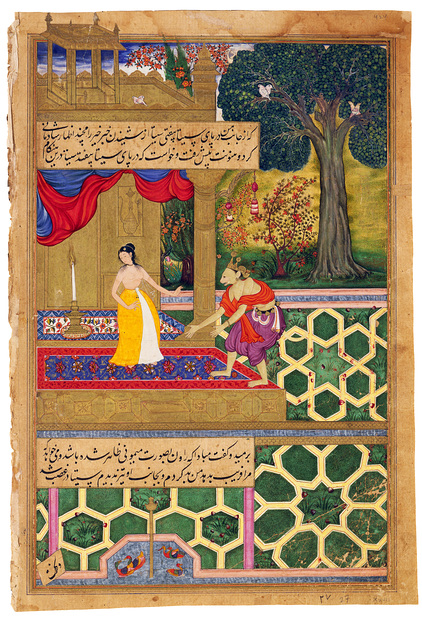
Sita shies away from Hanuman believing he is Ravana in disguise

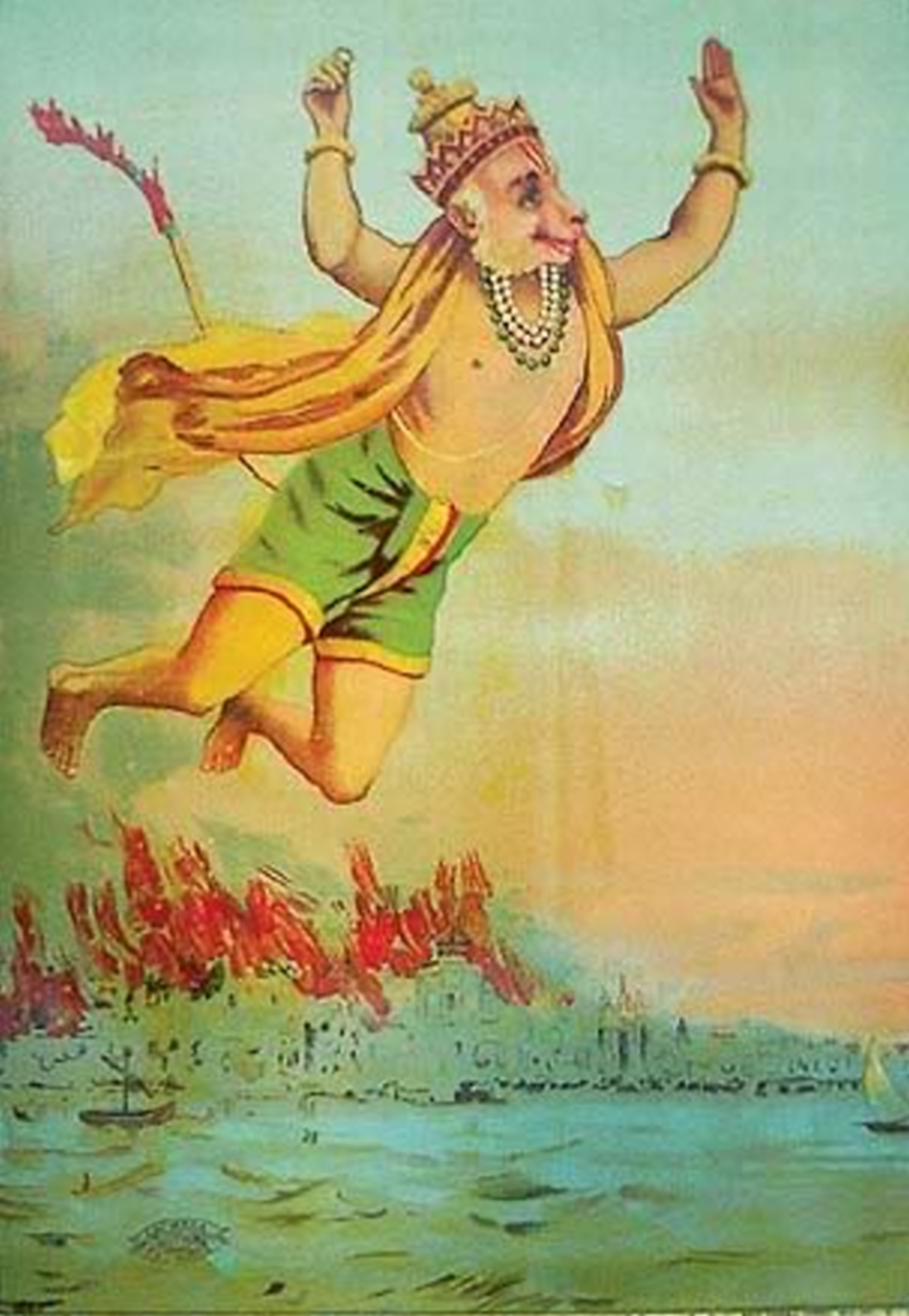
Lanka Dahan, the burning of Lanka by Hanuman.

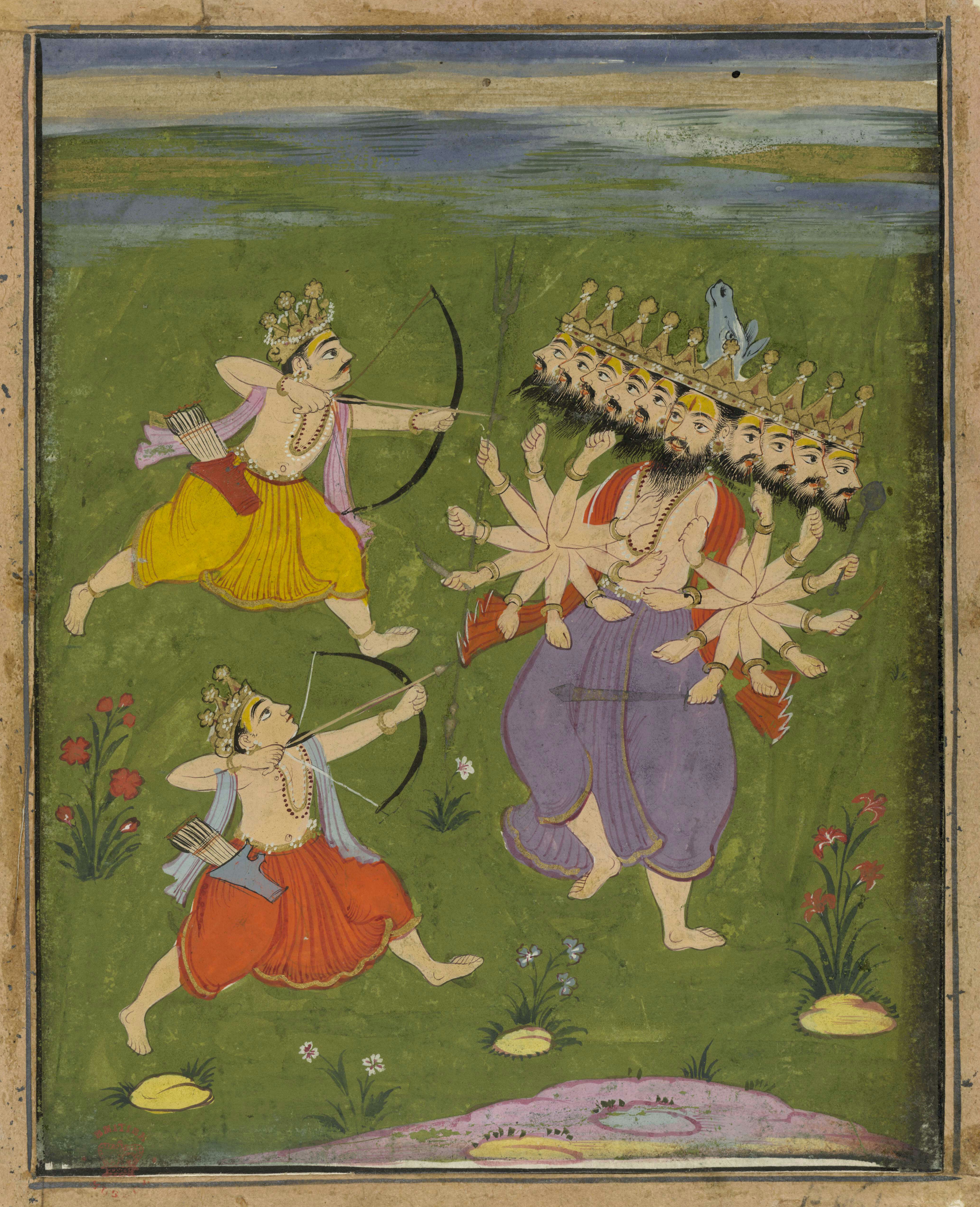
Killing of Ravana.

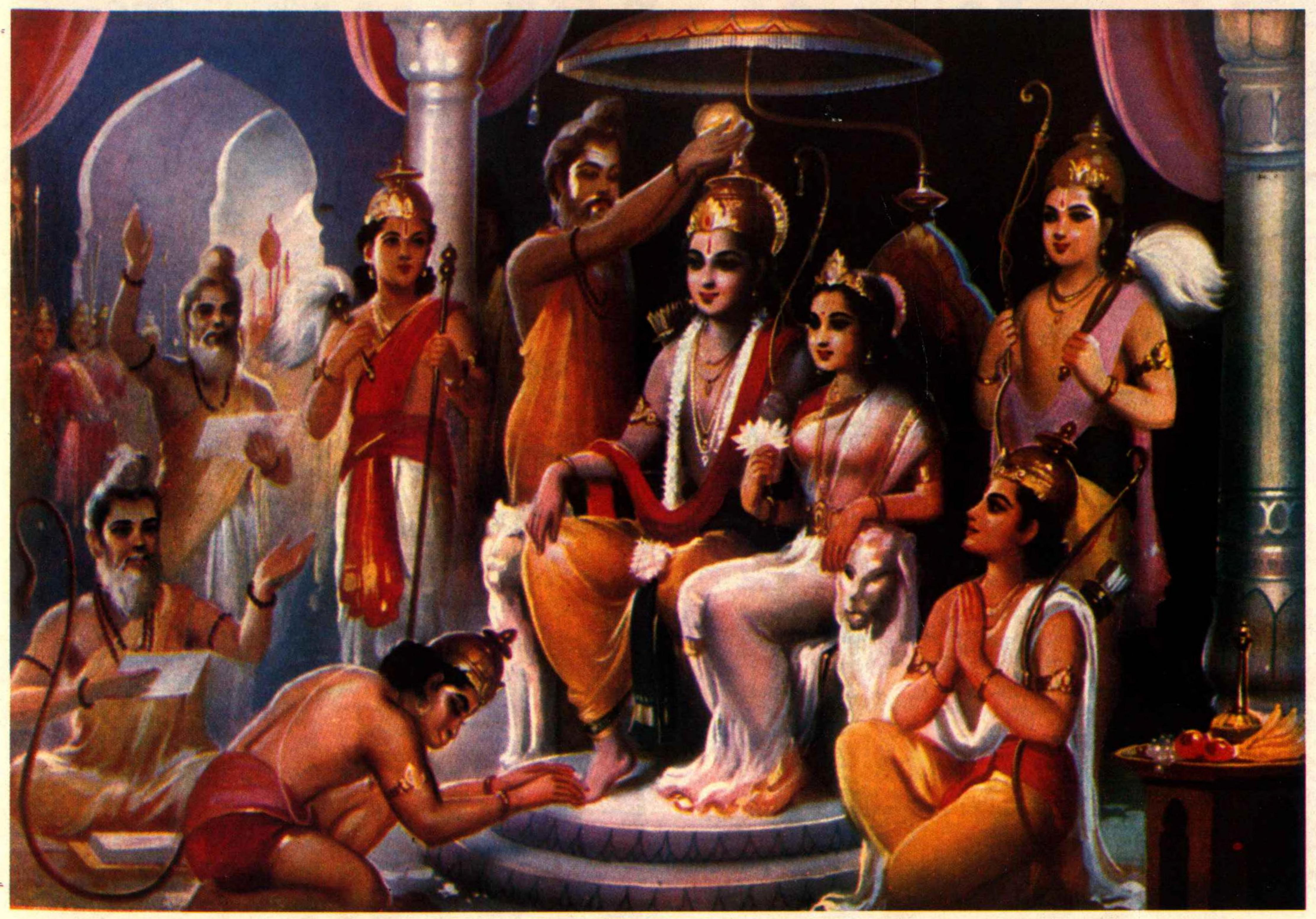
Coronation of Rama.

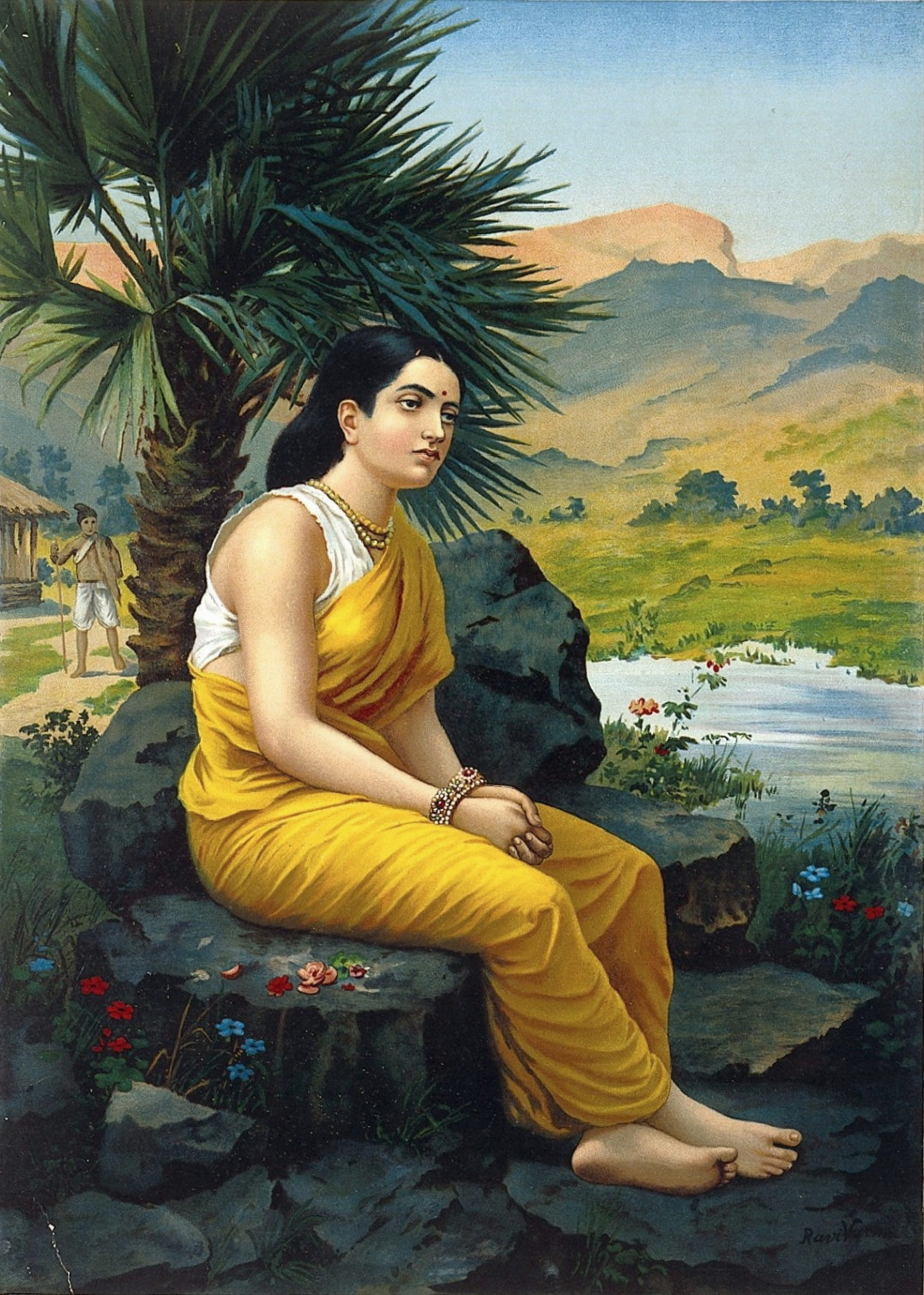
Sita in exile.

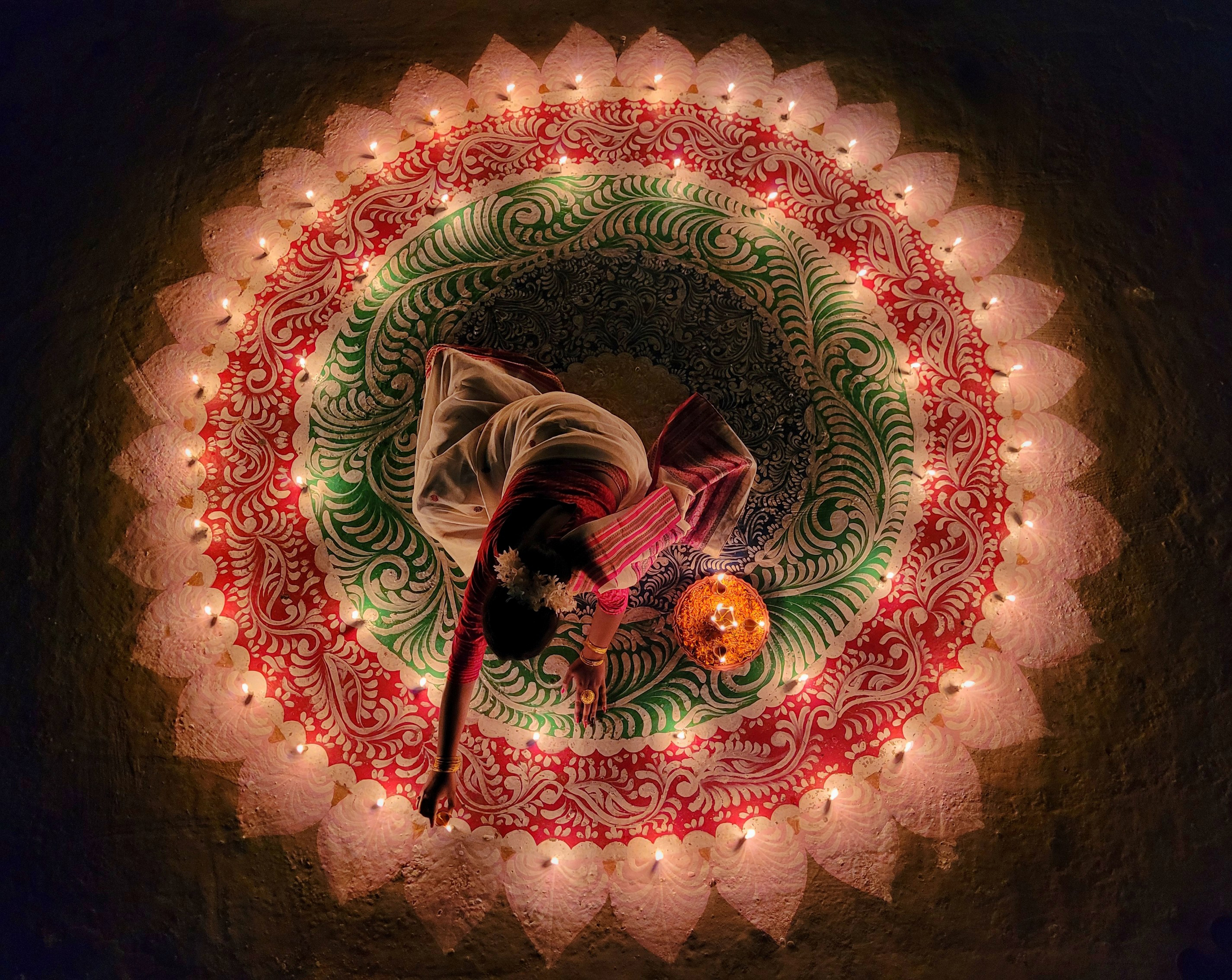
Traditional Diwali celebration, so as to mark the returning of Sita and Rama after 14 years of exile.

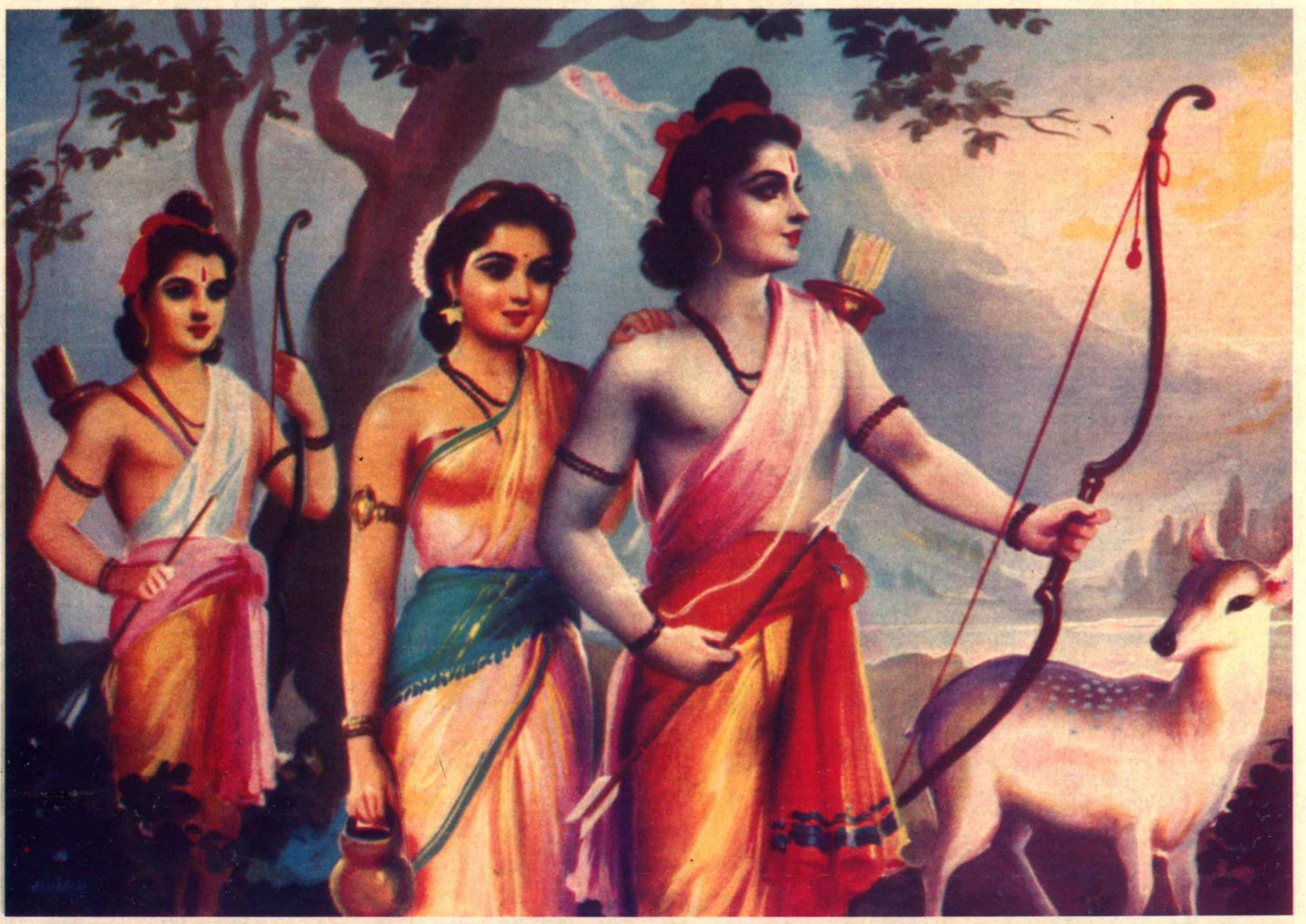
Rama in the exile, with his wife and brother

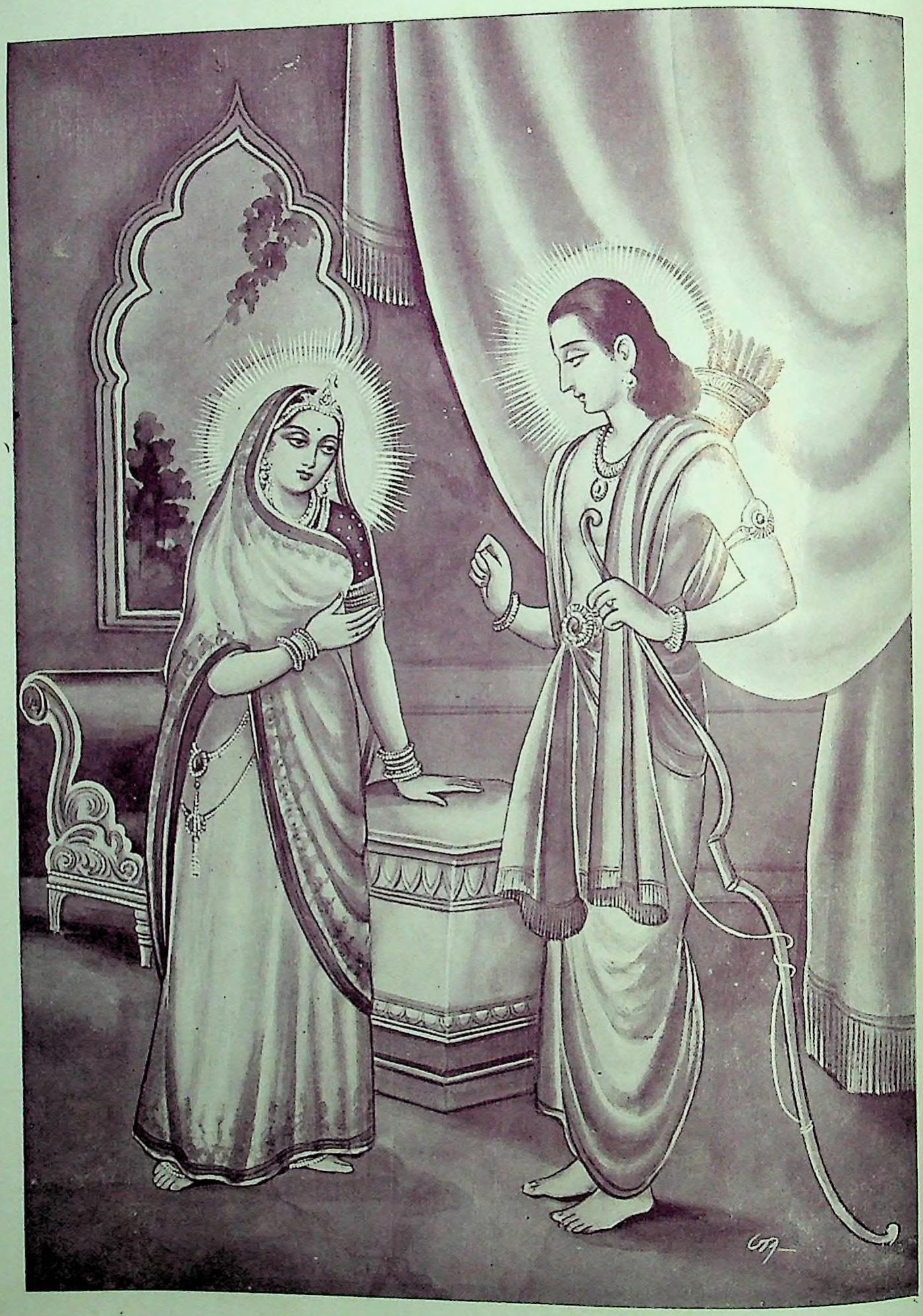
Rama and Sita before going to exile

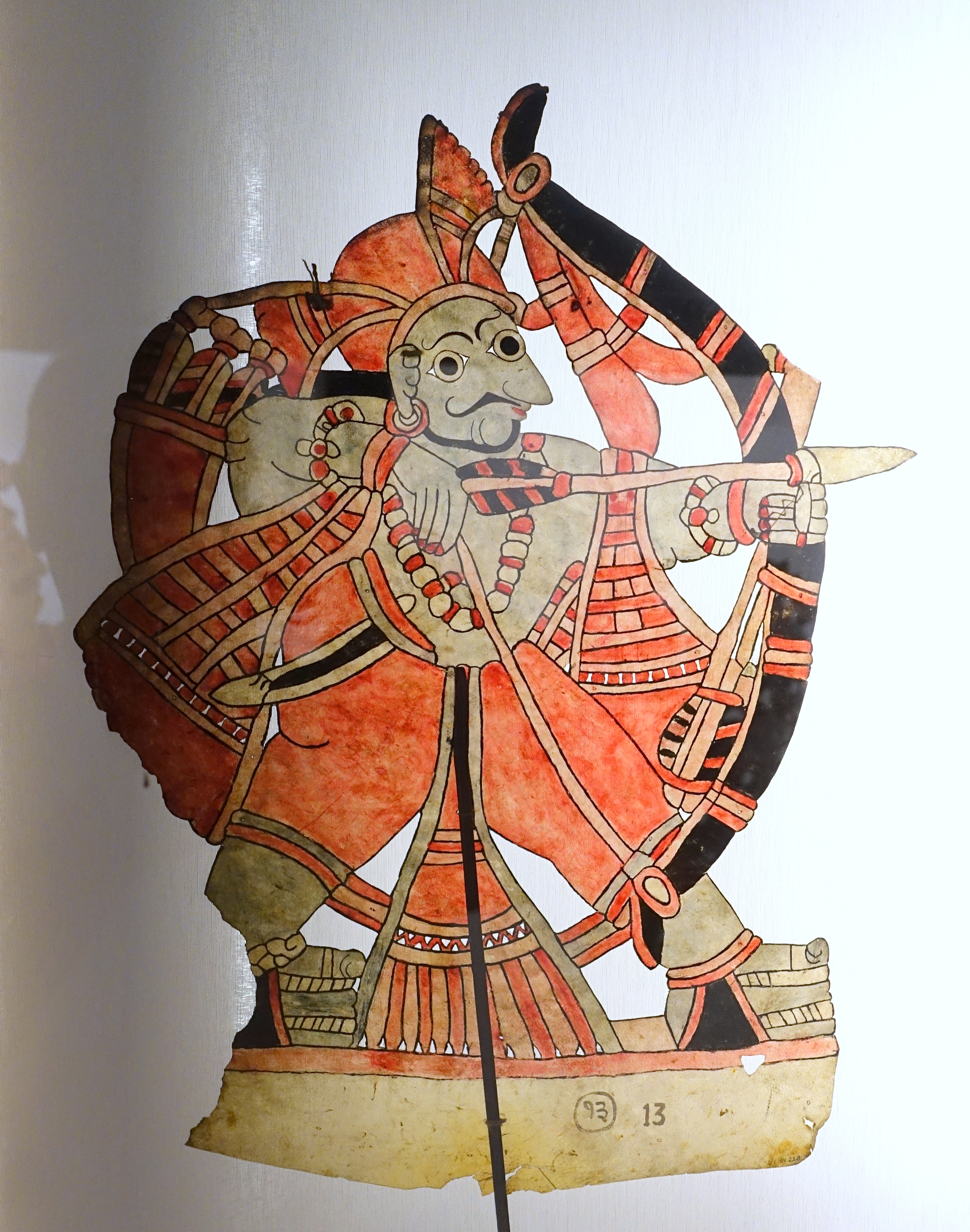
Rama in exile in the forest, setting off to hunt deer - Museu do Oriente - Lisbon, Portugal

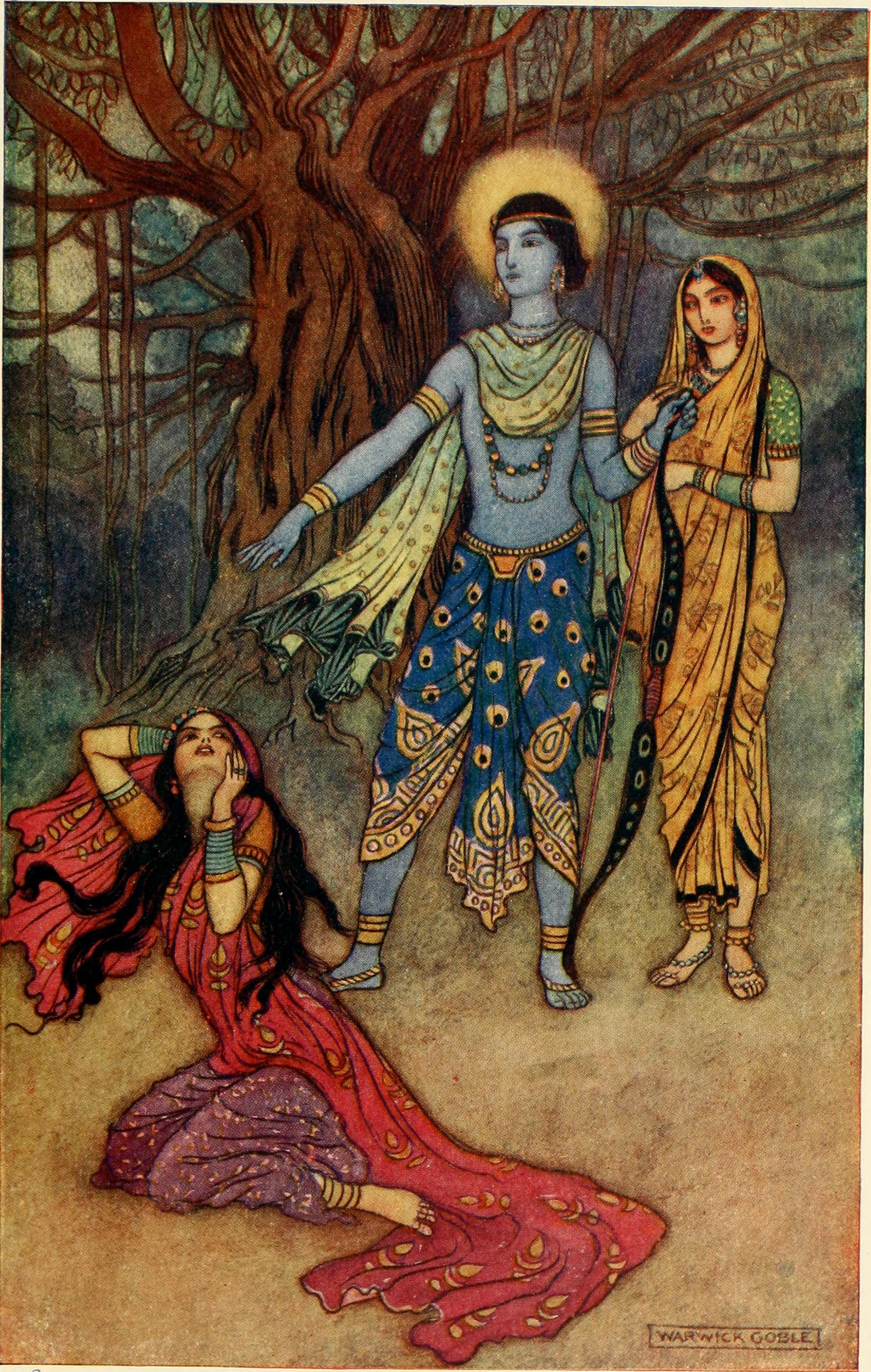
Rama Spurns Suparnakha by Warwick Goble

== See also ==
- Rama
- Ramayana
- Versions of Ramayana
- List of characters in Ramayana
- Rama's Journey in Mithila

== Sources ==
- Bose, Mandakranta (31 March 2016). "Rāmāyaṇa in the Hindu Tradition". Oxford Bibliographies in Hinduism. Oxford University Press. doi:10.1093/obo/9780195399318-0166.
- Brockington, J. L. (1998). The Sanskrit Epics. Brill. ISBN 90-04-10260-4.
- Goldman, Robert P. (1984). The Rāmāyaṇa of Vālmīki: An Epic of Ancient India, Vol. I, Bālakānda (PDF). Princeton University Press. ISBN 81-208-3162--4.
- Goldman, Robert P.; Sutherland Goldman, Sally J. (2022). The Rāmāyaṇa of Vālmīki: The Complete English Translation. Princeton University Press. ISBN 978-0-691-20686-8.
