= Ghanpur, Wanaparthy district =

Ghanpur (Khilla) Khilla Ghanpur
- village
- Country: India
- State: Telangana
- District: Wanaparthy

Languages
  - Official: Telugu
- Time zone: UTC+5:30 (IST)
- Postal code: 509380
- Vehicle registration: TS32
- Climate: hot (Köppen)
- Website: telangana.gov.in

Ghanpur is a Mandal in Wanaparthy district, Telangana. It is also known as Khilla Ghanpur.It was a part of Mahbubnagar district earlier to the formation of new districts in Telangana.

== Mandal Parishath ==
Duration	Name of M.P.P	Party affiliation
2014-2019	K. Krishna Naik	Telangana Rashtra Samithi
2019-Incumbent	K. Krishna Naik	Telangana Rashtra Samithi

== ZPTC member ==
Duration	Name of ZPTC member	Party affiliation
2014-2019	K.Ramesh Goud	Indian National Congress
2019-Incumbent	Samya Naik	Bharat Rashtra Samithi

== Institutions ==
- Zilla Parishad (Boys) High School
- Zilla Parishad (girls) High School
- Ravindra Vidyanikethan
- Kasturba Gandhi Balika Vidyalaya
- Govt. Junior College
- Goutham concept school
- T S model school (Donthikunta Thanda)

== Villages ==
The villages in Ghanpur mandal include:

- Agaram
- Almaipally
- Anthaipally
- Appareddipally
- Ghanpur
- Jangamaipally
- Kamaluddinpur
- Malkapur
- Mamidimada
- Manajipet
- Md.hussainpally
- Parvathapur
- Rukkannapally
- Salkalapur
- Shapur
- Solipur
- Thirumalaipally
- Upperpally
- Venkatampally

== History ==
This place was named after Kakatiya king Ganapathi Deva in 13th Century as Ganapuram, eventually it is spelled as Ghanpur. Since it has a Khilla, Telugu for fort, it popularly known as Khilla Ghanpur. Prior to the construction of the fort and naming this village as Ganapuram, there was a small village present with name Naginenepalli in 13th Century.
