= Bhoothpur =

Bhoothpur Bhudhapur
- mandal
- Nickname: Bhudhapur
- Location in Telangana, India Bhoothpur (India)
- Coordinates: 16.7000°N 78.0667°E
- Country: India
- State: Telangana State
- District: Mahbubnagar
- Elevation: 473 m (1,552 ft)

Languages
  - Official: Telugu
- Time zone: UTC+5:30 (IST)
- Vehicle registration: TG 06 AP-22 (Old)
- Vidhan Sabha constituency: Mahbubnagar
- Climate: hot (Köppen)
- Website: telangana.gov.in

Buthpur or Bhoothpur is a large area in Mahbubnagar district, Telangana.

== About Bhoothpur ==
Bhoothpur is now an area in Mahbubnagar city, it was a Mandal headquarter before 2019 in Mahbubnagar District of Telangana State, India. It is located 10 km towards East from city of Mahbubnagar.

Bhoothpur Pin code is 509382 and postal head office is Bhutpur .

- Pothulamadugu ( 4 km ), Kothamolgara ( 4 km ), Palakonda ( 5 km ), Yedira(m) ( 6 km ), Kappeta ( 6 km ) are the nearby Villages to Bhoothpur. Bhoothpur is surrounded by Mahbubnagar Mandal towards west, Jadcherla Mandal towards North, Ghanpur Mandal towards South, Thimmajipet Mandal towards East .
- Mahbubnagar, Badepalle, Nagarkurnool, Wanaparthy are the nearby Cities to Bhoothpur.

== Geography ==
Buthpur is located at 16.7000°N 78.0667°E. It has an average elevation of 473 metres (1555 ft).

This village name was Buddapur and somehow got changed to Bhoothpur. The village was named Buddapur as it was ruled by the great Gona Reddy dynasty king Gona Budda Reddy. It was named after him.

== How to Reach Bhoothpur ==
- By Road

Mahbubnagar is the Nearest city to Bhoothpur. Mahbubnagar is 10 km from Bhoothpur. Road connectivity is there from Mahbubnagar to Bhoothpur.

- By Rail

Diviti Palli Rail Way Station, Yenugonda Rail Way Station are the very nearby railway stations to Bhoothpur. Also you can consider railway Stations from Near By city Mahbubnagar. Mahbubnagar Town Rail Way Station, Mahbubnagar Rail Way Station are the railway stations near to Mahbubnagar. You can reach from Mahbubnagar to Bhoothpur by road after. However Hyderabad Decan Rail Way Station is amajor railway station 100 km from Bhoothpur

== Demographics of Bhoothpur ==
- Telugu is the Local Language here. Total population of Bhoothpur is 5110 .Males are 2746 and Females are 2,364 living in 902 Houses. Total area of Bhoothpur is 1414 hectares.

== Institutions ==
- Panchavati Hospital
- Govt Junior College
- Panchavati Vidyalaya
- State Bank of India.
- New Era Talent School, a school with in the Municipal location. Beside National Highway 44. It is furnished with all amenities
- Palamoor Private ITI

== Holy places ==
- Shiva Temple
- Sanjevaraya Temple
- Sri Hanuman Temple.
- Sri Muni Rangaswamy Temple.
- Oldest Nandishwaraya Temple. (Nandi Temple)

== Villages ==
The villages in Bhoothpur mandal include:

- Amisthapur
- Annasagar
- Bhattupally
- Bhoothpur
- Yelkicherla
- Hasnapoor
- Ippalapally
- Kappeta
- Karivena
- Kothamolgara
- Kothur
- Maddigatla
- Patha Molgara
- Pothulamadugu
- Thatikonda
- Thatiparthy
- Sheri pally(Hasnapoor)
- Sheri pally(B)
