= Gona Budda Reddy =

13th century Indian Hindu poet

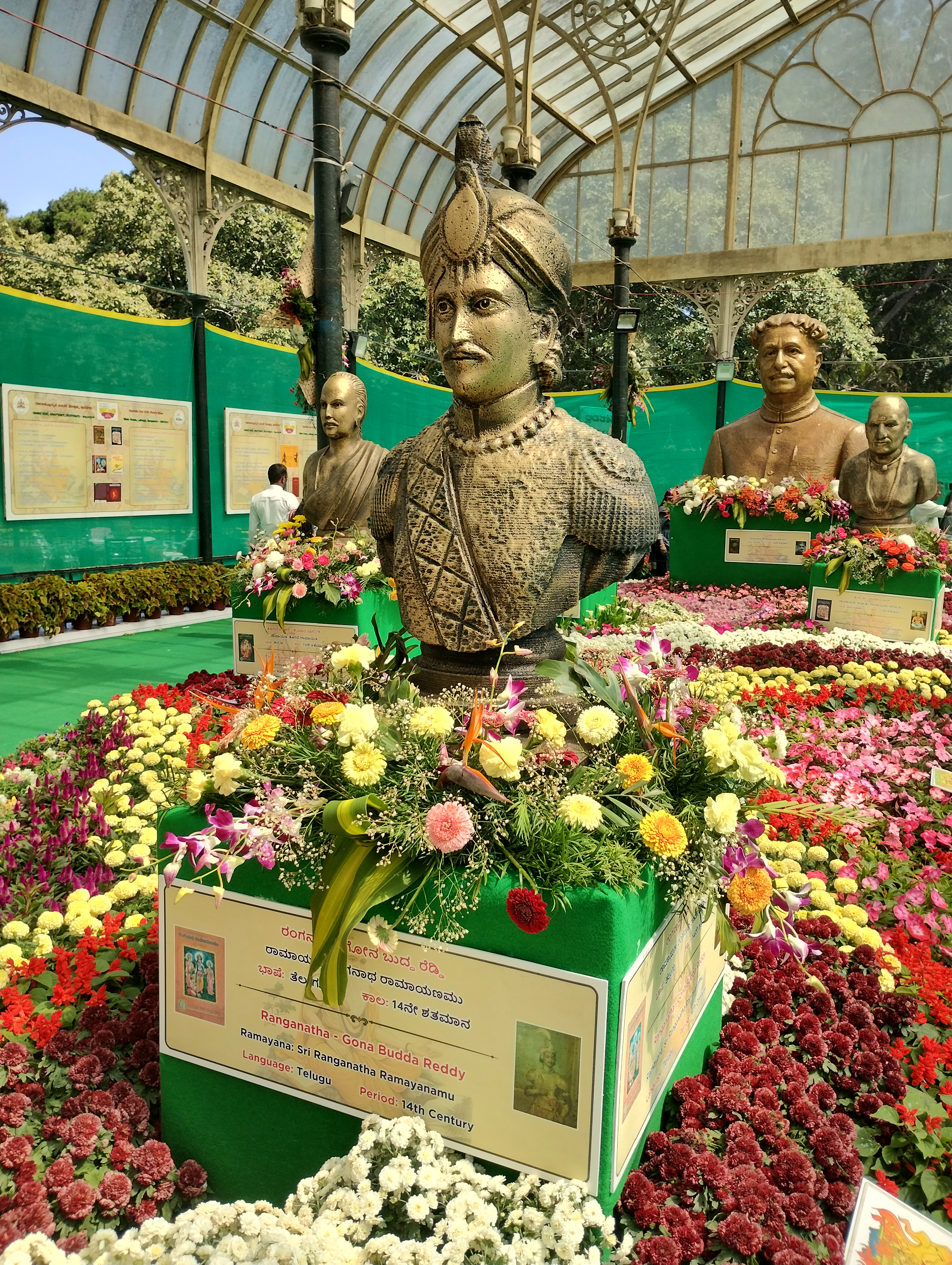
- Sculpture of the poet in Lal Bagh, Bangalore, in January 2025
- Reign: 13th century CE

Gona Buddha Reddy, who wrote Ranganatha Ramayanam (13th century CE), was a poet and ruler living in southern India.

== Written work ==
His Ranganatha Ramayanam is a pioneering work in the Telugu language on the theme of the Ramayana epic. According to Dr.Sanganabatla Narsaiah he wrote this dwipada kavyam around 1280CE , possibly with help from his family. The work has become part of cultural life in Andhra Pradesh, Telangana and is used in puppet shows.

== Gona Dynasty ==
According to Sanganabhatla Narsaiah and as per 11 inscriptions by Gona family and information in Ranganatha Ramayanam, there are prominently two Buddha Reddy Kings. Gona Buddha Reddy II is grandson of Gona BuddhaBhupathi.

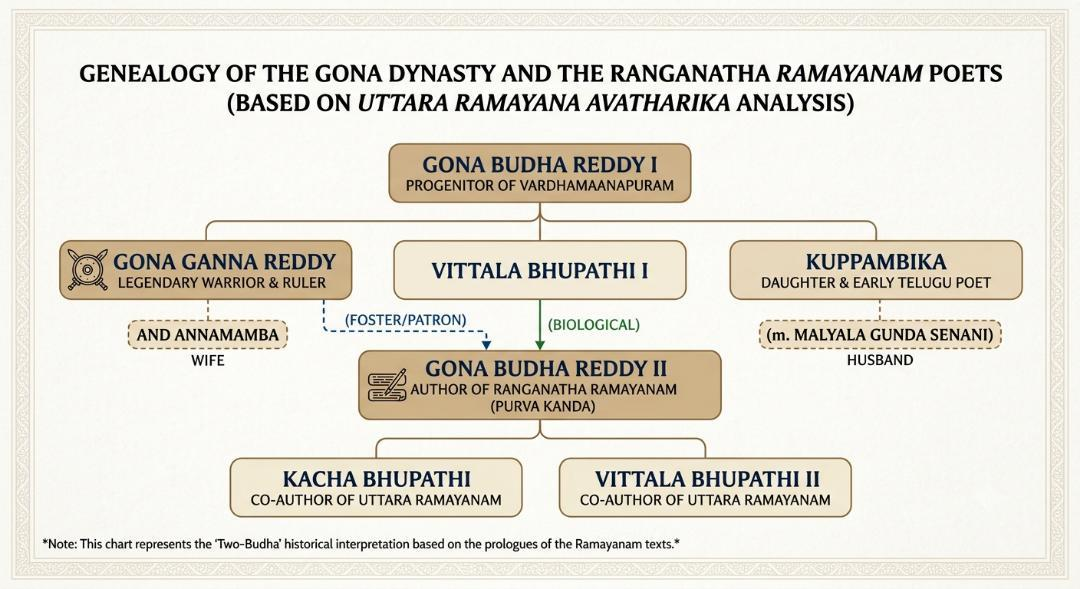
Family Tree of Gona Reddy Kings
