= Wanaparthy Assembly constituency =

Constituency of the Telangana legislative assembly in India

Coordinates: 16.36°N 78.06°E

Wanaparthy
- Constituency No. 78 for the Telangana Legislative Assembly
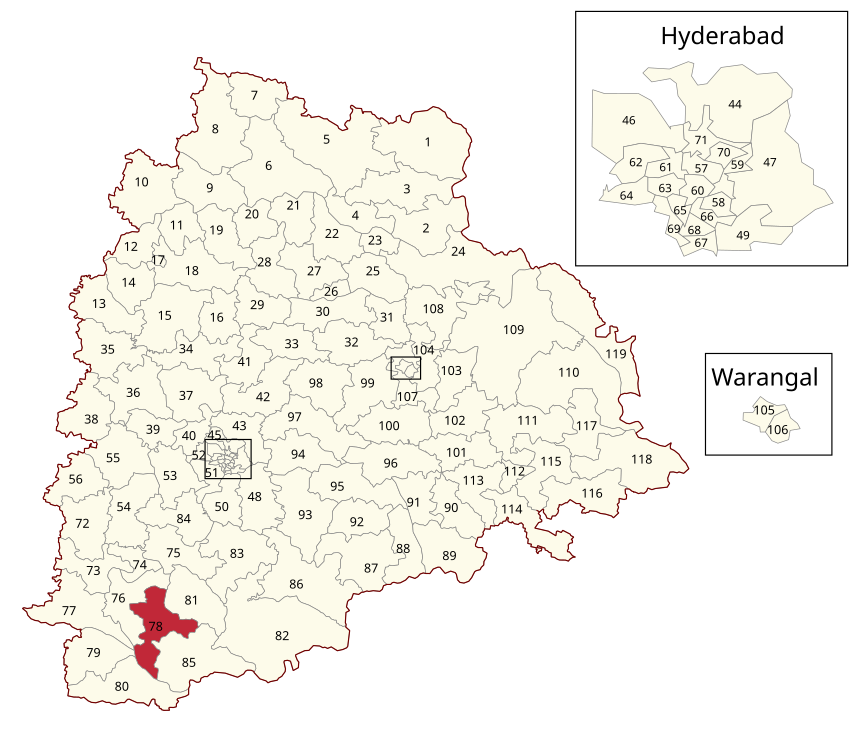
- Location of Wanaparthy Assembly constituency within Telangana

Constituency details
- Country: India
- Region: South India
- State: Telangana
- District: Wanaparthy
- Lok Sabha constituency: Nagarkurnool
- Established: 1951
- Total electors: 2,27917
- Reservation: None

Member of Legislative Assembly
- 3rd Telangana Legislative Assembly
- Incumbent Tudi Megha Reddy
- Party: Indian National Congress
- Elected year: 2023

Wanaparthy Assembly constituency is a constituency of the Telangana Legislative Assembly, India. It is one of the 14 constituencies in Mahbubnagar district.

Tudi Megha Reddy is currently representing the constituency.

== Mandals ==
The assembly constituency presently comprises the following mandals:

Mandal
Wanaparthy
Pebbair
Gopalpeta
Peddamandadi
Ghanpur
Atmakur
Narva
Amarchintha

== Members of Legislative Assembly ==
Year of election	MLA	Political party
Hyderabad State
1952	Suravaram Pratapareddy	Indian National Congress
1953	M.R. Reddy	Praja Socialist Party
Andhra Pradesh
1957	Padmanabha Reddy	Indian National Congress
1962	Rani Kumudini Devi	Indian National Congress
1967	Rani Kumudini Devi	Indian National Congress
1972	Ayyappa	Indian National Congress
1978	Moolamalla Jayaramulu	Indian National Congress
1980	D.K.Satya Reddy	Indian National Congress
1983	Dr. A. Balakrishnaiah	Telugu Desam Party
1985	Dr. A. Balakrishnaiah	Telugu Desam Party
1989	Dr. Gillela Chinna Reddy	Indian National Congress
1994	Ravula Chandra Sekar Reddy	Telugu Desam Party
1999	Dr. Gillela Chinna Reddy	Indian National Congress
2004	Dr. Gillela Chinna Reddy	Indian National Congress
2009	Ravula Chandra Sekar Reddy	Telugu Desam Party
Telangana
2014	Dr. Gillela Chinna Reddy	Indian National Congress
2018	Singireddy Niranjan Reddy	Telangana Rashtra Samithi
2023	Tudi Megha Reddy	Indian National Congress

== Election results ==
=== Telangana Legislative Assembly election, 2023 ===
Telangana Assembly Elections, 2023: Wanaparthy (Assembly constituency)
Party	Candidate	Votes	%	±%
INC	Tudi Megha Reddy	107,115	50.25	
BRS	Singireddy Niranjan Reddy	81,795	38.37	
BJP	Anugna Reddy Bujala	9,185	4.31	
BSP	Mandla Maiboos	3,982	1.87	
Alliance of Democratic Reforms Party	Arjuna Yadav Kundhella	2,393	1.12	
Independent	Munipally Rajinikanth	2,146	1.01	
Independent	Katravath Ramulu	2,013	0.94	
NOTA	None of the Above	1,938	0.91	
Majority		25,320	11.88	
Turnout		2,13,164		
INC gain from BRS		Swing		

=== Telangana Legislative Assembly election, 2018 ===
Telangana Assembly Elections, 2018: Wanaparthy (Assembly constituency)
Party	Candidate	Votes	%	±%
TRS	Singireddy Niranjan Reddy	111,956	60.31	
INC	Dr. Gillela Chinna Reddy	60,271	32.47	
BJP	Kotha Amarendar Reddy	3,168	1.71	
Independent	Bujala Venkateshwar Reddy	2,266	1.22	
Bahujan Samaj Party (Kainth)	Aavula Bahujana Satyam Sagarudu	2,203	1.19	
NOTA	None of the Above	2,014	1.08	
Majority		51,685	27.84	
Turnout		1,85,647	81.40	
TRS gain from INC		Swing		

=== Telangana Legislative Assembly election, 2014 ===
Telangana Assembly Elections, 2014: Wanaparthy (Assembly constituency)
Party	Candidate	Votes	%	±%
INC	Dr. Gillela Chinna Reddy	59,543	35.38	
TRS	Singireddy Niranjan Reddy	55,252	32.83	
TDP	Ravula Chandra Sekar Reddy	45,200	26.86	
Independent	Kotham Prashant	2,759	1.64	
BSP	Vanguri Madduletty	1,489	0.88	
NOTA	None of the Above	860	0.51	
Majority		4,291	2.55	
Turnout		1,68,291	71.04	
INC gain from TDP		Swing		

== See also ==
- List of constituencies of Telangana Legislative Assembly
