= Srirangapur =

Srirangapur శ్రీరంగపూర్ Shri Rangapur
- village
- Location in Telangana, India Srirangapur (India)
- Coordinates: 16.191597°N 78.050564°E
- Country: India
- State: Telangana
- District: Wanaparthy

Languages
  - Official: Telugu
- Time zone: UTC+5:30 (IST)
- Postal code: 509 207
- Telephone code: 08545
- Vehicle registration: AP22 & TS06 & TS32
- Lok Sabha constituency: Nagar Kurnool
- Vidhan Sabha constituency: Wanaparthy
- Climate: hot (Köppen)
- Website: telangana.gov.in

Srirangapur also known as Sri Rangapuram is a village and a mandal in Wanaparthy district in the state of Telangana, India. Srirangapur is about 10 km from Pebber and 25 km from Wanaparthy

== History ==
India's oldest temples was built by Rajas of Wanaparthy Samsthanam in the 18th century in Sri Rangapur ancient Hindu temple Sri Ranganayaka Swamy Temple there is under pass to gadawal from ranganayaka temple.

== Villages ==
The villages in Madanapur mandal include:

1. Srirangapur
2. Thatipamula
3. Nagarala
4. Kamballapur
5. Venkatapur
6. Nagasanipalle
7. sherupally
8. Janampeta
