= Sri Ranganayaka Swamy Temple =

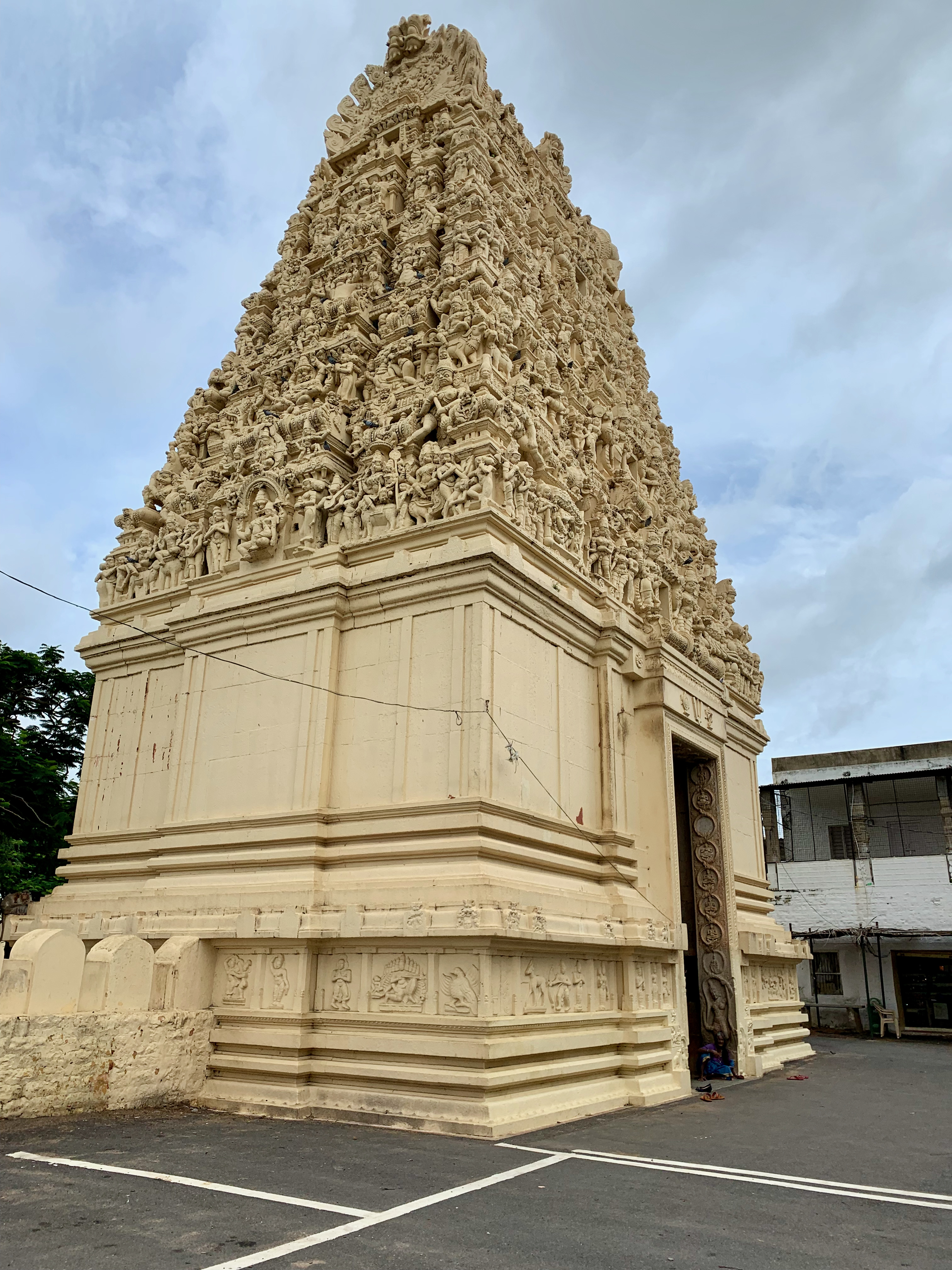

Religion
- Affiliation: Hinduism
- Deity: Sri Ranganayakaswamy

Location
- Location: Shri Rangapur Village, Pebbair (Mandal), Wanaparthy District, Telangana
- State: Telangana
- Country: India
- Interactive map of Sri Ranganayaka Swamy Temple
- Coordinates: 16.198°N 78.049°E

Architecture
- Creator: Baheri Gopala Rao
- Completed: 18th century (Saka 1685)

Sri Ranganayaka Swamy Temple, also known as the Shri Rangapur Temple, was constructed in the 18th century AD by Raja Baheri Gopal Rao of Wanaparthy Samasthanam It is located in Shri Rangapur Village, Pebbair, Wanaparthy District, Telangana.

Raja of Wanaparthy Baheri Gopal Rao was very fond of the Sri Ranganathaswamy Temple in Srirangam and wanted to build a similar temple in his region, historical and epigraphical evidence confirms it was built in the 18th century by the Rajas of Wanaparthy. The temple features Vijayanagara-style architecture.

== History ==
According to epigraphical evidence, the Sri Ranganayaka Swamy Temple was constructed by Baheri Gopala Rao, the ruler of the Wanaparthy Samsthanam, a family belonging to the Motati Reddy Vamsa. He built the temple at Garudachala in Srirangapuram and installed the presiding deity, Sri Ranganadha Swamy, in the Saka year 1685 (circa 1763 AD). The temple was specifically built as a replica of the Sri Ranganatha Swamy temple in Srirangam, earning it the name "Uttara Srirangapuram" (Srirangapuram of the North).

A tank named "Ranga Samudram" was excavated alongside the temple. Later additions to the temple, such as the Mukha Mandapas, were constructed by Sankaramba, the wife of another Wanaparthy ruler, Rama Krishna Rao.

== Festivals ==
The temple hosts multiple festivals per year:

- Brahmotsavalu, Krishna worship festival
- Jatara, 15-day holy pilgrimage

== Transport ==
Srirangapur is about 10 km from Pebber and 25 km from Wanaparthy, as well as 160 km from Hyderabad The nearest railway station is Gadwal station, which is about 40 km for passenger trains.
