= Dhodaguntapally =

Coordinates: 16.445°N 78.053°E

Dhodaguntapally is a historical village in Peddamandadi mandal, Wanaparthy district, Telangana, India. Its population is around 2000 and its main language is Telugu. The villagers' main occupation is agriculture and Dhodaguntapally is one of the top ground nut producing villages in the vicinity of Wanaparthi. The village has a government primary school.
