= Gopalpeta mandal =

Gopalpeta
- Mandal
- Country: India
- State: Telangana
- District: Wanaparthy

Languages
  - Official: Telugu
- Time zone: UTC+5:30 (IST)
- Vehicle registration: TS 32
- Climate: hot (Köppen)

Gopalpeta is a Mandal in Wanaparthy district, Telangana, India.

== Institutions ==
- Zilla Parishad High School
- Government Junior College

== Villages ==
The villages in Gopalpeta mandal include:

- Bandaraipakula
- Buddaram
- Chakalapally
- Cheerkapally
- Chennur
- Gopalpet
- Jainthirmalapur
- Keshampet
- Munnanoor
- Nagapur
- Polkepad
- Revally
- Tadiparthy
- Talpunur
- Yedula
- Yedutla
