= Wanaparthy Samsthanam =

Vassal of the Nizam of Hyderabad

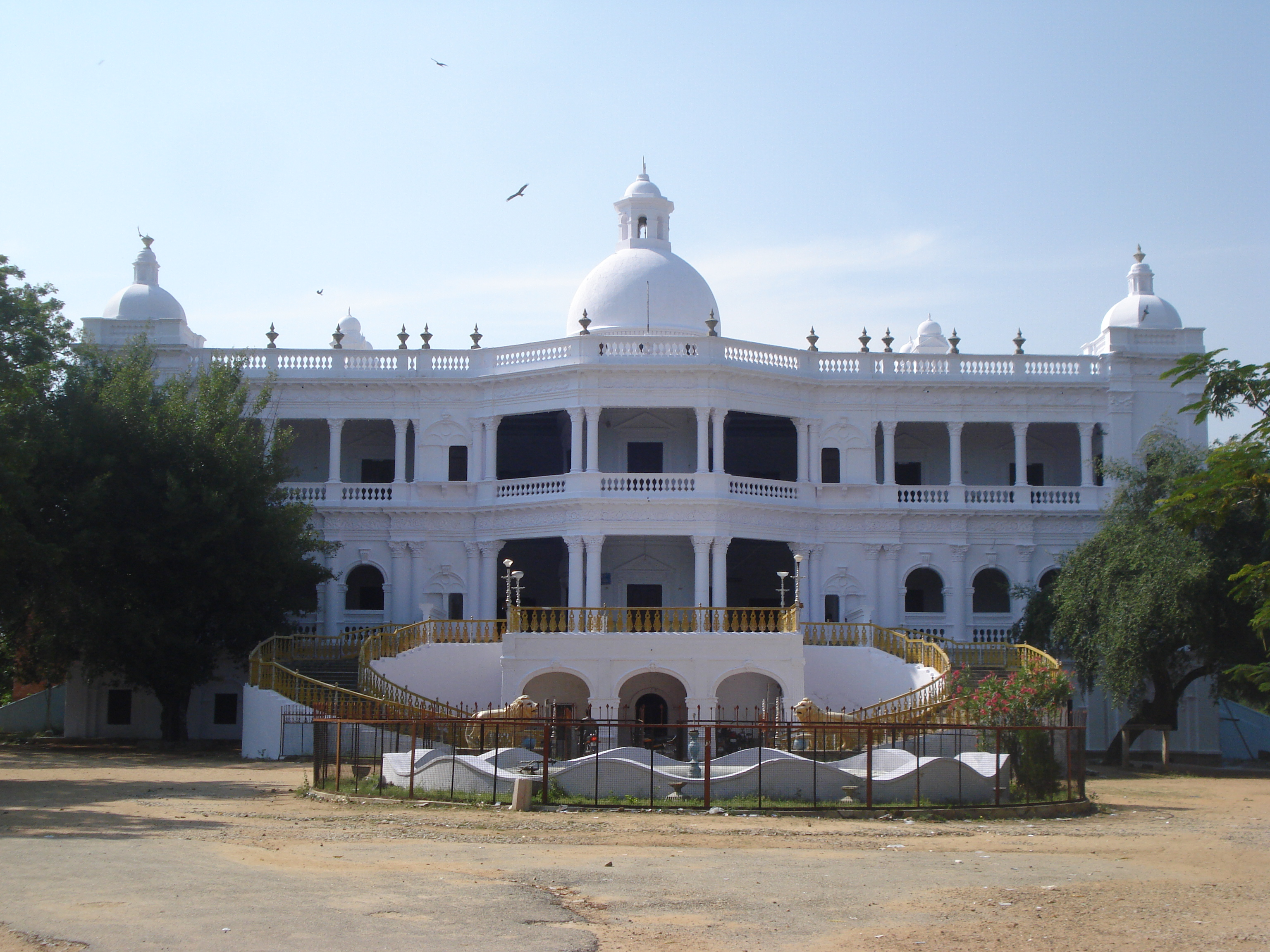
Wanaparthy Samsthanam's Palace

Wanaparthy Samsthanam or Raja of Wanaparthy was a semi-sovereign dynasty coming from the times of Kakatiyas, who were also vassal of the Nizam of Hyderabad. He controlled the feudatory of Wanaparthy. It was one of the three important Samsthanams in Telangana, the other two being Gadwal Samsthanam and Jatprole Samsthanam.

Wanaparthy Samsthanam was founded around 1512 CE under Bahmani suzerainty, supported by Turkic dynasties that empowered local Hindu Reddy chieftains as semi-autonomous rulers in the Deccan region.

== History ==
Wanaparthy Samsthanam was founded by Veera Venkata Krishna Reddy who hails from Present day Kadapa Dist and belong to Motati Reddy Clan, Wanaparthy Samasthanam traces its history back to the 14th century after the Kakatiya kingdom declined. The successive Turkic Muslim dynasties, who invaded and settled in Deccan, found it ideal for Samsthanam to prevail. It was surrounded by three other Samasthanams.

Wanaparthy was one of the 14 major Zamindari segments in Telangana in Post-Independent India.

For administrative purposes the Samsthan was divided into two talukas namely "sugar" and "Kesampet" under to Tahsildars.

1512 - 1540 AD : Raja Veera Krishna Reddy

1540 - 1566 AD : Raja Venkata Reddy

1566 - 1592 AD : Raja Rama Krishna Reddy

1592 - 1625 AD : Raja Pedda Venkata Reddy

1625 - 1648 AD : Raja Inunidi Venkata Reddy

1648 - 1676 AD : Raja Gopal Rao

1676 - 1691 AD : Raja Bahiri Gopal Rao

1691 - 1719 AD : Raja Venkata Reddy

1719 - 1746 AD : Raja Bahiri Gopal Rao

1746 - 1763 AD : Raja Sawai Venkata Rao

1763 - : Raja Bahiri Gopal Rao

1781 AD : Rani Janamma

1781 - 1807 AD : Rani B. Janamma

1807 - 1822 AD : Raja Ramkrishna Rao I

1822 - 1866 AD : Raja Rameshwar Rao I, on 17 March 1843, the title of "Balwant" was conferred on the Raja as a mark of honour by 3rd Nizam Sikander Jah. To build an armed force, Raja imported Siddis from Somalia and Abyssinia and organized them into 2 regiments African Bodyguard and Wanaparthy Lancers.

On account of skirmishes and conflicts between Rajas forces and Nizams the British residency intervened and arranged a treaty by which the Raja presented his regiments to Nizam and was appointed as inspector general of Nizams forces and Nizam accepted Rajas autonomy.

The Hyderabadi battalion of the Bison Division was formed on 5 November 1853. The Nizam had appointed the Raja as inspector of his army and after the Raja's death in 1866, the battalion was absorbed into the Nizam's Army and became its nucleus.

1866 - 1880 AD : Raja Ramkrishna Rao II

1880 - 1922 AD : Raja Rameshwar Rao III, he was adopted from a family in Rangapuram that traditionally supplied adoptive heirs to the royal family; married and had issue. He died on 22 November 1922, being survived by two sons.

1922 - 1944 AD : Raja Krishna Deva Rao As his successor, Krishna Dev, was a minor, his estate was managed as a Ward of the Court. Krishna Dev himself died before attaining majority and the crown passed on to his son Rameshwar Rao III.

1944 - 1998 AD : Janumpalli Rameshwar Rao III Thereafter India abolished all regal titles

He was born on 23 February 1923 in Madras to Raja Krishnadeva Rao and Rani Sarala Devi.

He studied at Nizam College, Hyderabad, Madras University and Bombay University.

1944 : He was granted full administrative powers in 1944.

1950 - 1957 : Joined the Foreign Service and served in various capacities till 1957, including a posting as First Secretary, India's Commission in Nairobi.

1957 –1977 : Member of Parliament from Mahabhubnagar Constituency Member of the United Nations Conciliation Commission on the Congo 1960/1961; Chairman of Orient Longman 1964/1968

He died at the age of 75 years in Hyderabad on 15 September 1998. He is survived by wife Shanta, one son and three daughters.

== The Vassal Family ==
The Wanaparthy Samasthanam Rulers belonged to the Reddy community and maintained ties and alliances with other Reddy princely states such as Sirnapalli Samasthanam, Gadwal Samasthanam, Alampur Samasthanam, Gopalpeta Samasthanam, and Warangal Pingle Sardeshmukhs. Princess Janamma of Wanaparthy Samasthanam (daughter of the second Rameshwar Rao) married Raja Ramalinga Reddy of Sirnapalli Samasthanam.

Raja Rameshwar Rao II, who was a vassal of the Nizam of Hyderabad, died on 22 November 1922. As his successor, Krishna Dev, was a minor, his estate was managed as a Ward of the Court. Krishna Dev himself died before attaining majority and the crown passed on to his son Rameshwar Rao III, later to become simply J. Rameshwar Rao.

With the surname 'Janampalli', Ramdev Rao was the youngest son of the Raja of Wanaparthy. He had an older sister, Janamma, and elder brother Krishna Dev. The family roots have spread around Mahbubnagar district, Jadcherla and nearby talukas. Kingdom of Hyderabad first Hindu Kotwal Raja Bahadur Venkatarama Reddy was a Grand Nephew of the Raja of Wanaparthy.

Raja Ramdev Rao has said that he didn't have much interaction with his father – it was quite a formal relationship – and he only replied to him when spoken to.

== Contributions to architecture ==
Raja Rameshwar Rao left behind a grand legacy of structures constructed during his reign. 1885 constructed Wanaparthy Palace, Sarala Sagar Project is the second biggest dam in Asia with siphon technology. It is the oldest project in India after independence Raja of Wanaparthy Raja Rameshwara Rao founded by the Sarala Sagar Dam Project that has incorporated siphon technology from California, United States.

Earlier Raja of Wanaparthy, Raja Baheri Gopal Rao was very fond and inspired of the Sri Ranganathaswamy Temple in Srirangam and wanted to build a similar temple in his region, and built the Sri Ranganayaka Swamy Temple in Shri Rangapur Village, Pebbair, Wanaparthy District, Telangana, historical and epigraphical evidence confirms it was built in the 18th century. The temple features Vijayanagara-style architecture.

== Armed forces ==
The early Rajas maintained an army numbering 2000 infantry and 2000 cavalry. The time the kingdom fell into the ambit of the powerful Hyderabad State, until Wanaparthy's armed forces were absorbed into the Hyderabad Army as the Bison battalion on the orders of Nizam of Hyderabad. The ruler was relegated from commander to the honorary post of Inspector of the Bison battalion. Subsequent to the Hyderabad State's merger with the Indian Union in 1948, all units of the Hyderabad State Forces were disbanded and volunteers absorbed into the Indian Army. These units, colloquially known as the "Hyderabadis" had, for that time, a unique mixed class composition.

== See also ==
- Gadwal Samsthanam
- Papannapet Samsthanam
- Samasthans of Hyderabad
