= Yaperla =

Village in Telangana, India

Coordinates: 16.05637°N 78.06190°E

Yaparla or Yaperla, located on the banks of the River Krishna, is one of the 27 villages of Pebbair Mandal in Wanaparthy district, Telangana, India.
