= Kadukuntla =

Kadukuntla is a village in Wanaparthy district of Telangana state in India. It is 14 km southwest of Wanaparthy by road.
