= Dagadapally =

Dagadapally/chinna dagada Dagadapally Chinna dagada
- Country: India
- State: Telangana

Dagadapally (or chinna dagada) (Telugu: Telugu) is a village in Veepangandla mandal in Wanaparthy district of Telangana State, India.
