= Sirnapalli Samasthanam =

The Sirnapalli Samsthanam was one of the prominent princely states in the Nizamabad district.

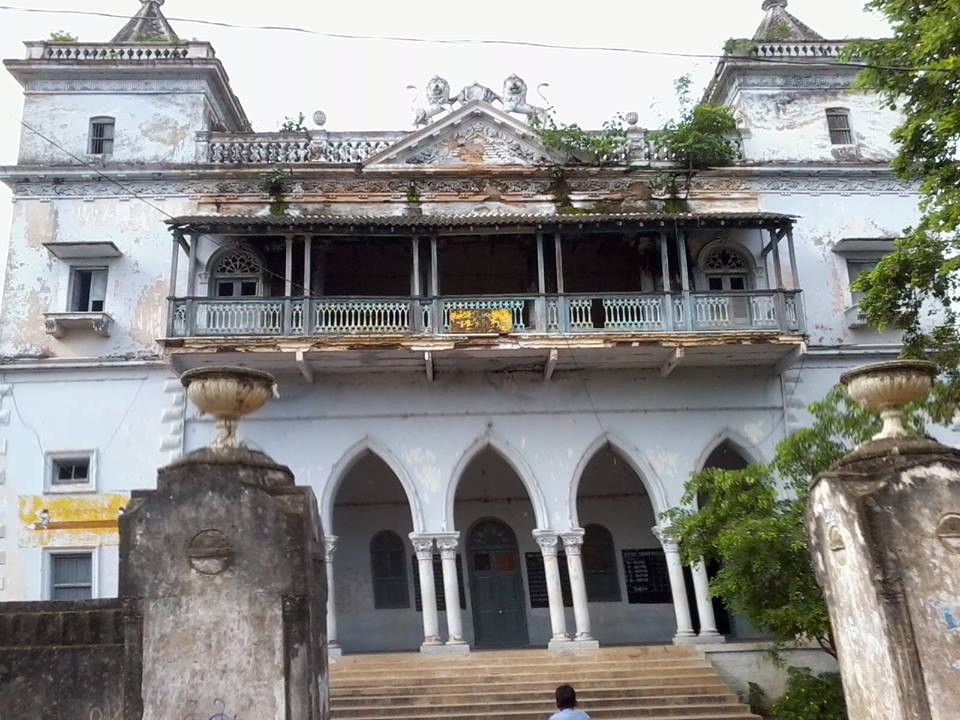
Sirnapalli Gadi

The developmental works undertaken during the reign of Rani Janakibai, during the era of the Nizam Nawab, remain immortal to this day. She ruled the Sirnapalli Samasthanam from 1859 to 1920. She commissioned the construction of tanks, dams, ponds, wells, and canals. Her administrative reach extended across 100 villages, spanning from Janakampet and Navipet all the way to Renjal, and she oversaw various construction projects, including structures in Indalwai, the Sirnapalli Gadi and Kotagalli Gadi in Nizamabad, and the Clock Tower in Mahabub Gunj. While the Nizam Nawab had originally planned to lay the Secunderabad–Nizamabad railway line via Uppalwai and Dichpally, she successfully ensured that the line was instead routed through her own territory of Sirnapalli.

== Sirnapally Gadi(Fort) ==
Among the various *gadies* (fortified mansions) of Telangana, the Sirnapalli Gadi in Nizamabad district boasts the most ancient history. The Sirnapalli Samasthanam was initially under the rule of the Kakatiyas, subsequently under the Qutub Shahis, and eventually came under the administration of the Nizams. Spanning an area of approximately five acres, the Sirnapalli Fort remains artistically intact and remarkably well-preserved to this day. The bastions atop the fort are sculpted in a pyramidal shape, bearing a striking resemblance to the caps worn by the Qutb Shahi rulers. This historic Gadi has been preserved from falling into ruin thanks to its donation for use as a school.

== Rani Janakibai ==
Among the local villagers, numerous fascinating stories circulate regarding Sheelam Janakibai, the renowned queen associated with this principality. One such narrative recounts how an official in the service of the Nizam ventured alone into the forest for a hunt, subsequently lost his way, and spent several terrifying days wandering within the woods; it is said that a twelve-year-old girl, who had entered the forest to gather firewood, discovered the official and safely guided him back out. Impressed by the girl's immense intelligence and exceptional presence of mind, the official reportedly consulted with the Nizam, who then entrusted the administration of the Sirnapalli principality to the young girl. This very girl was Sheelam Janakibai, who went on to govern 141 villages from the Sirnapalli Gadi.

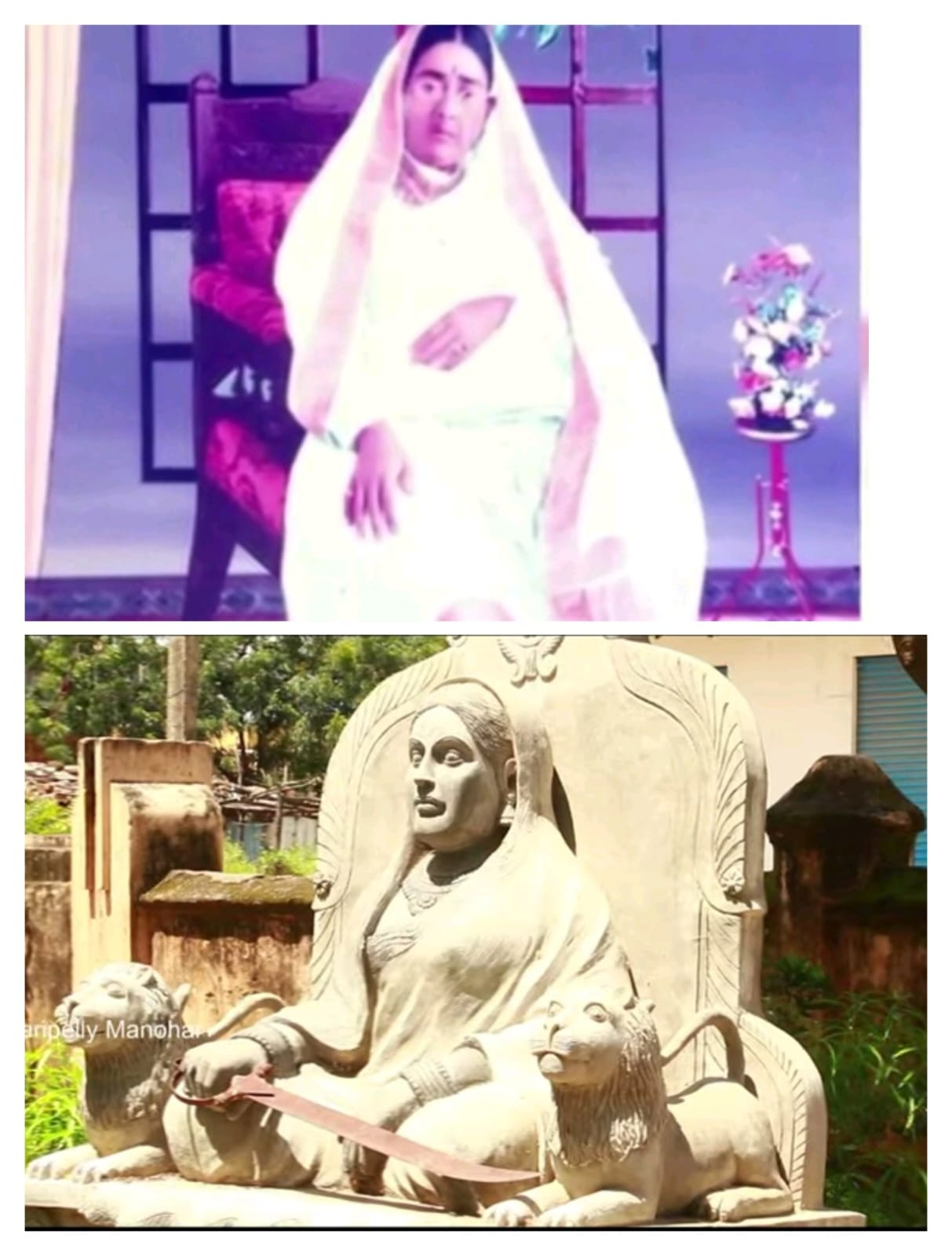
Rani Janakibai

Having ascended the throne of the Sirnapalli principality at a very young age, the Queen commissioned the excavation of tanks, dams, ponds, wells, and canals. The Nizam was deeply impressed by the administrative acumen Janakibai demonstrated in the timely collection of taxes and their prompt remittance to him. It is said that the official whose life Janakibai had saved played a pivotal role in molding her into an efficient administrator. Upon reaching womanhood, Janakibai reportedly married a man belonging to the Reddy community from Tekmal in the Medak district and brought him to reside with her in her own home. However, as she remained childless, she subsequently adopted Ramachandra Reddy from the Medak district.

The developmental works undertaken during the era of the Nizam Nawabs—specifically during the time of Rani Janakibai—remain timeless to this day. It is said that in 1887, while Salar Jung I was in the process of organizing the administrative districts, it was Janakibai who renamed the entire region then known as 'Indur' to 'Nizambad.' This very 'Nizambad' gradually evolved into the name 'Nizamabad.' In 1899, Mir Mahboob Ali Khan, the Nizam Nawab, decided to construct a railway line connecting Hyderabad to Manmad in Maharashtra. Upon learning that the initial plan proposed laying the railway track from Bolarum to Manmad via Bodhan, Janakibai reportedly persuaded the ruler to reroute it through Sirnapalli and Indur instead. In gratitude for this intervention, the town of Indur was renamed Nizamabad. Thus, a railway station was established in Nizamabad as early as the year 1905.

Those who speak of Janakibai's administration describe her as the "Lady of the Day-Torches." The term *Pagati Mashal* signifies the lighting of torches during the daytime. It is said that whenever Janakibai traveled to a town in her palanquin, attendants carrying torches would walk both in front of and behind her. In that era, traveling in a palanquin accompanied by torches during the day was regarded as a symbol of the highest royal status.

== Samasthanam Rulers ==
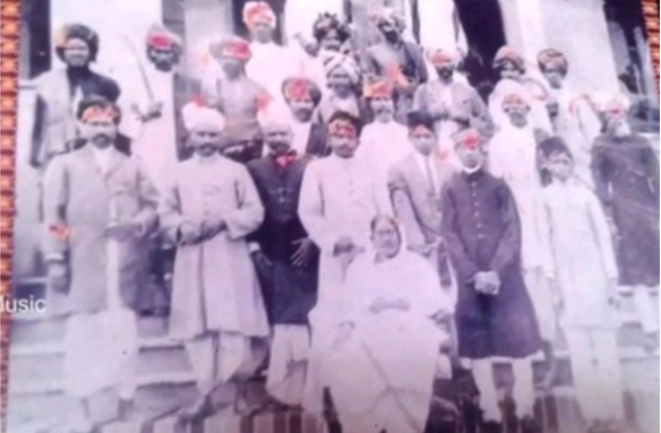
Rani Janakibai with her family

The Sirnapalli Samasthanam Rulers belonged to the Reddy community and maintained ties and alliances with other Reddy princely states such as Wanaparthy Samasthanam, Domakonda, and Velpur. Princess Janamma of Wanaparthy Samasthanam (daughter of the second Rameshwar Rao) married Raja Ramalinga Reddy of Sirnapalli. It is believed that the renowned Rani Janakibai hailed from the Rekulapalli family of the Velpur princely state. The last ruler of the principality, Sriram Bhupal, retired as an IAS officer and settled in Hyderabad with his family.
