= Madanapur =

- Location in Telangana, India Madanapur (India)
- Coordinates: 16.383515°N 77.888596°E
- Country: India
- State: Telangana
- District: Wanaparthy
- Time zone: UTC+5:30 (IST)
- PIN: 509381
- Vehicle registration: TS-32
- Nearest city: Kothakota Wanaparthy
- Lok Sabha constituency: Mahabubnagar
- Vidhan Sabha constituency: Devarakadra
- Climate: hot (Köppen)
- Website: telangana.gov.in

Madanapur is a village and Mandal headquarters located in Wanaparthy district in the Telangana state of India.

== Villages ==
The villages in Madanapur mandal include:

1. Madanapur
2. Govindahalli
3. Dantanoor
4. Shankarampeta
5. Thirumalaipalle
6. Ramanpadu
7. Ajjakollu
8. Narsingapur
9. Narsingapur thanda
10. Konnur
11. konnur pedda thanda
12. Dwarakanagar
13. Nelividi
14. Nelividi thanda
15. Duppalle
16. Durable thanda
17. Kothapalle
18. Gopanpet
19. Karvena
20. Karvena thanda
21. Bhavsingh thanda
22. Bogguloni thanda
23. Mumpu thanda
