= Gadwal Samsthanam =

Vassal of the Nizam of Hyderabad

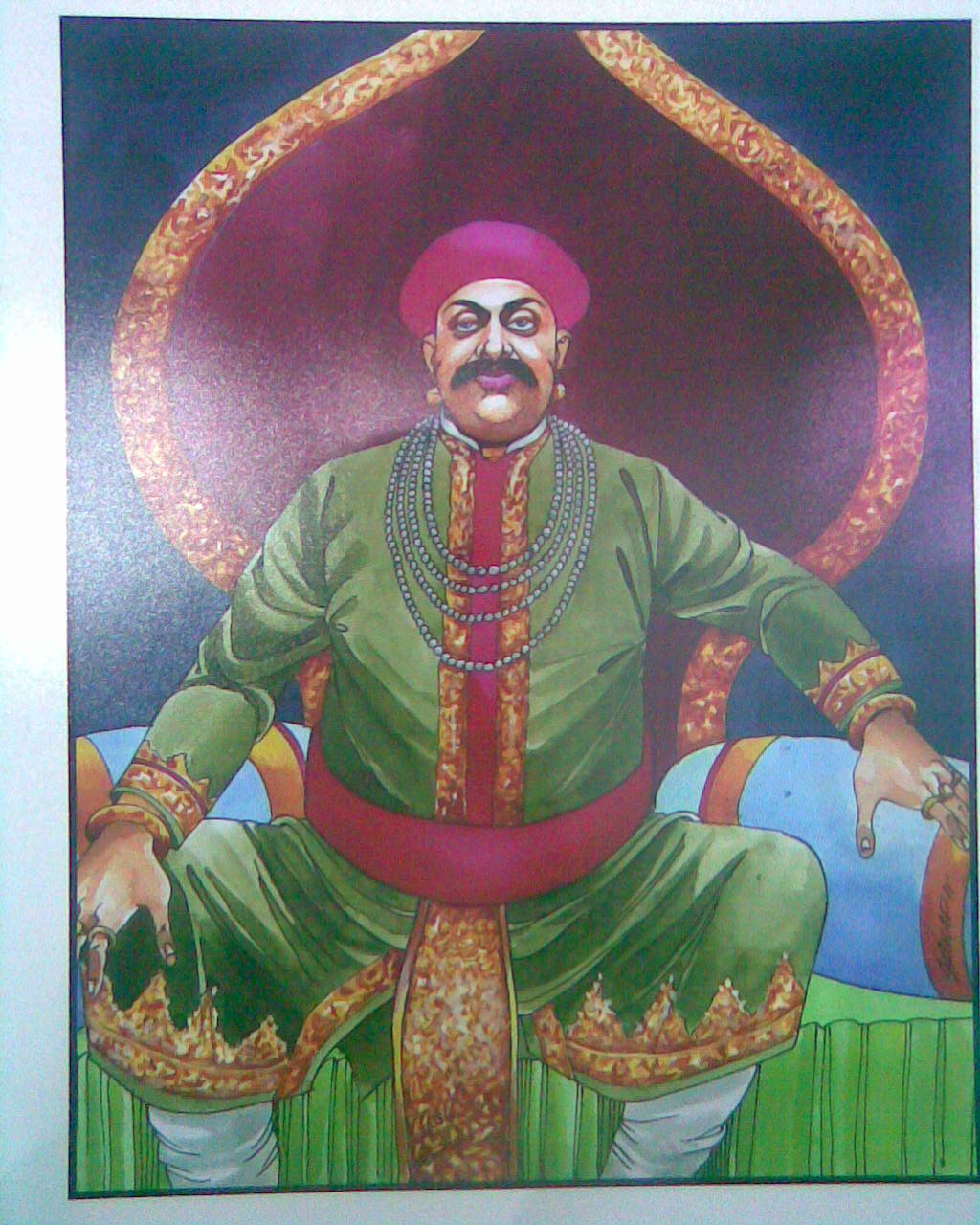
Somanadri

Gadwal Samsthanam was a semi-sovereign dynasty coming from the times of late Kakatiyas and later vassal of the Nizam of Hyderabad. Once part of Raichur district, it is now Gadwal in Jogulamba Gadwal district. It was one of the three important samsthanams, the other two being Wanaparthy Samsthanam and Jatprole Samsthanam.

== Historical Places ==
Gadwal Fort
- Interactive map of Gadwal Fort
- Location: Jogulamba Gadwal, Telangana, India

History
- Built: 1662
- Built by: Somanadri
- Abandoned: 1948

The Samsthanam contains a now dilapidated fort known as Gadwal, or Nalla Somanadri Fort.

Lingamma Bavi and Chokkamma Bavi
- Interactive map of Lingamma Bavi and Chokkamma Bavi
- Location: Jogulamba Gadwal, Telangana, India

History
- Built: between 1662 and 1713
- Built by: Somanadri

Lingamma Bavi and Chokkamma Bavi are two wells constructed by Somanadri. The wells were named based on the names of his wives Lingamma and Chokkamma.

== The Feudatory ==
Rulers of Gadwal Samasthanam belonged to the Reddy community, and had marital relations with other Reddy Samasthanams like Papannapeta Samasthanam and Domakonda Samasthanam.

It was once ruled by a feudal lord, Maha Raja Sri Somashekar Ananda Bhoopal Reddy, also called Somanadri, who hailed from Poodoor village. Gadwal has developed around a fort built by Somanadri. This Gadwal Samsthanam was protected by Mallichetti Vamshiyulu. The Nagi Reddy fondly knew Nagappa was an Ayngarashakulu of Gadwal samsthanam (Raja somanadri was a minor). When Nagappa died in a war with fanatic sultans, Narsappa succeeded him as Gadwal Samsthanam Ayngarashakulu. Unfortunately, for some reason, he then had to leave the palace.

In 1947, the feudatory queen of Gadwal Samsthanam during Nizam rule, Adi Lakshmidevamma, aided forces led by Sardar Vallabhbhai Patel in annexing Hyderabad State into independent India, and let those forces enter Hyderabad State through Gadwal.

== List of Rulers ==
According to the family history, Pedda Veera Reddy, Peddanna Bhupaludu, Sarga Reddy, Veera Reddy and Kumara Veera Reddy ruled Gadwal between 1553 and 1704.

== Asthana Purohit ==
The last known feudal lord to live in Gadwal Samsthanam, Maharani Adhilakshmi Devamma, appointed S.P. Anandamurthy. Anandamurthy was, at the time, in charge of the Agraharam in Gadwal containing Ramachandra Swamy Temple, along with the surrounding lands. When the Maharani Adhilaxmi Devamma moved to Hyderabad with her children, S.P.Anandamurthy appointed S.P. Narashimamurthy as the Asthan Purohit to move along with the Asthanam to Hyderabad to perform the daily rituals at the palace. S.P. Narashimamurthy, along with his wife, S.P. Subbamma and the adopted child (S.P. Subrahmanyam) moved to Hyderabad.

== Popular culture ==
The Samsthanam was the main feature in a hit 2009 Telugu movie, Arundhati and Kondaveeti Raja.

== Gallery ==
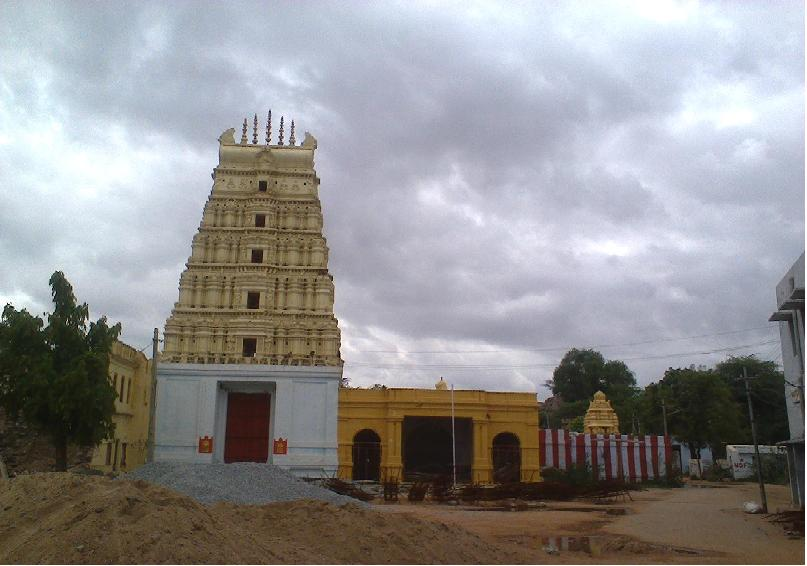
Chennakeshava swamy temple in Gadwal Fort

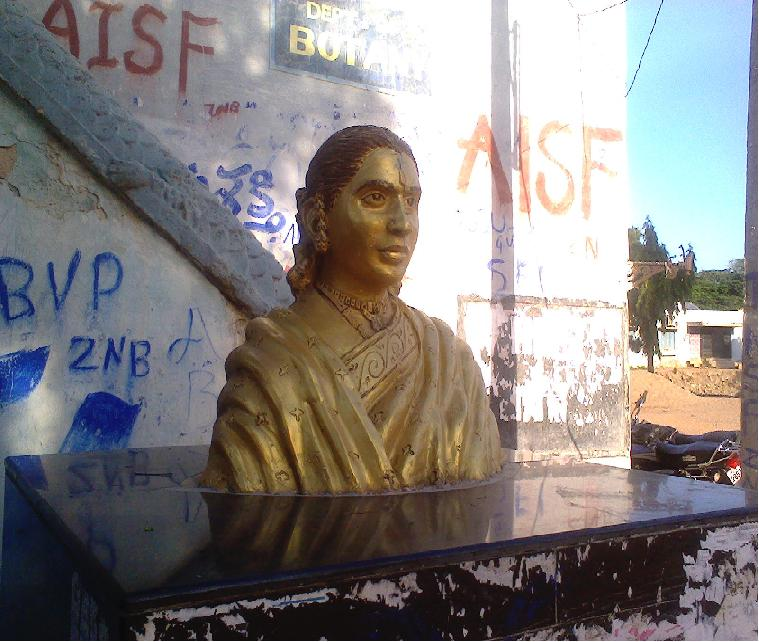
Maharani Adhilaxmi Devamma

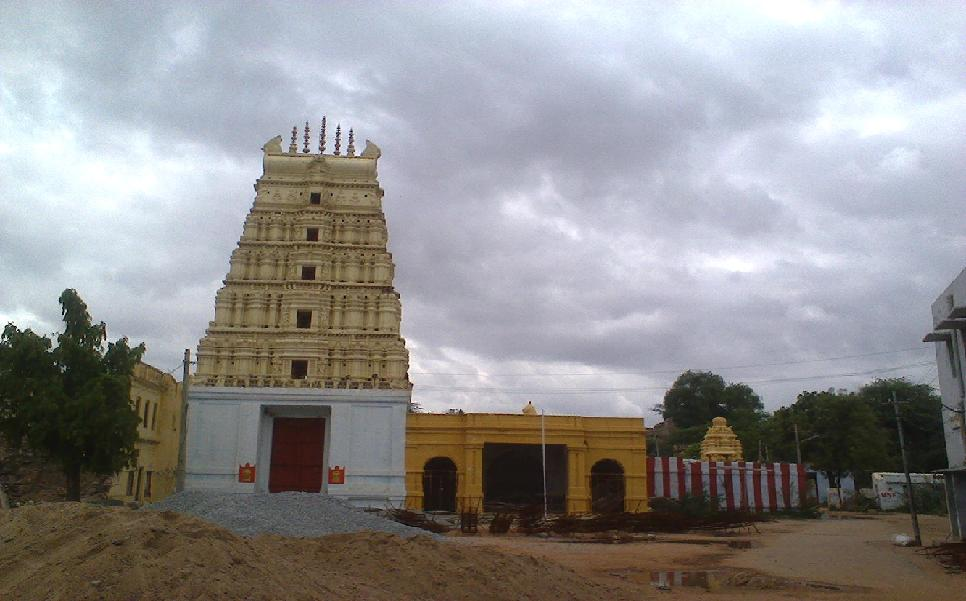
Chenna Keshava Temple

== See also ==
- Wanaparthy Samsthanam
- Papannapet Samsthanam
- Samasthans of Hyderabad
- Gona Budda Reddy
- List of Reddy dynasties and states
