= Thalpunoor =

- village
- Location in Telangana, India Thalpunoor (India)
- Coordinates: 16.406°N 78.242°E
- Country: India
- State: Telangana
- District: Wanaparthy

Population (2001)
  - Total: 2,991

Languages
  - Official: Telugu
- Time zone: UTC+5:30 (IST)
- PIN: 509235
- Telephone code: 91 8540
- Vehicle registration: TS32-

Thalpunoor is a small village in Wanaparthy district, Telangana, India, situated in between 16.406 degrees northern longitude and 78.242° eastern latitude.

== Population stats ==
According to the 2021 census, total population was 2,991, male constitutes 1,520 and female 1,471, literacy is just above 67.13%.
