= Tudi Megha Reddy =

Indian politician

Tudi Megha Reddy (born 1972) is an Indian politician from Telangana state. He is an MLA from Wanaparthy Assembly constituency in Wanaparthy district. He represents Indian National Congress party and won the 2023 Telangana Legislative Assembly election.

== Early life and education ==
Reddy is from Mangampalli village, Peddamandadi mandal, Wanaparthy district. He was born to Tudi Sai Reddy. He is a former corporate employee and former president of Mandal Praja Parishad. He completed his intermediate in 1993 but discontinued his B.Sc. studies in the third year in 1995.

== Career ==
Reddy won from Wanaparthy Assembly constituency representing Indian National Congress in the 2023 Telangana Legislative Assembly election. He polled 107,115 votes and defeated his nearest rival, Singireddy Niranjan Reddy of Bharat Rashtra Samithi, by a margin of 25, 320 votes.
