= Bekkem =

Village in Telangana, India

Bekkem is a village in Chinnambaavi mandal in Wanaparthy district of Telangana, India.

Bekkem is a combination of 3 villages: Nelabilk, Peddhabilk and Gudem. Total population is 4005. Bekkem's Pin code is 509104 and the postal head office is Pebbair.
