= Hyderabadi battalion =

Hyderabadi battalion, earlier known as Bison Division battalion was the military belonging to Nizam's Hyderabad Contingent. It was active until Annexation of Hyderabad with India in 1948 and it was merged with the Bison division of the Indian Army.

== History ==
The Bison Division battalion was raised on 5 November 1853 by Raja Rameshwar Rao, Raja of Wanaparthy, a vassal of the Nizam. It was taken over by the Nizam in 1866 and merged with the Hyderabadi battalion.

== The battalion ==
The battalion was known as the Hyderabadis. The unit had a mixed class composition with no rank structure.
