= Ravula Chandrasekhar Reddy =

Indian politician

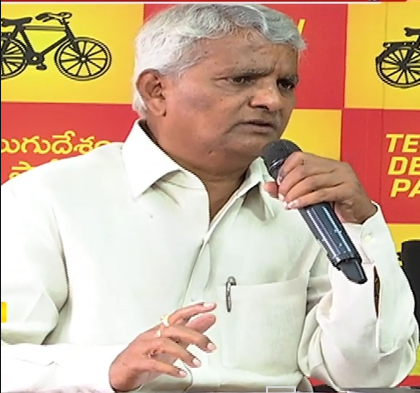
- Reddy in 2018

Member of Parliament, Rajya Sabha
- In office 10 April 2002 – 9 April 2008
- Preceded by: Daggubati Venkateswara Rao
- Succeeded by: K. V. P. Ramachandra Rao
- Constituency: Andhra Pradesh

Member of Legislative Assembly Andhra Pradesh
- In office 16 May 2009 – 16 May 2014
- Preceded by: Dr. Gillela Chinna Reddy
- Succeeded by: Dr. Gillela Chinna Reddy
- Constituency: Wanaparthy
- In office 1 December 1994 – 6 October 1999
- Preceded by: Dr. Gillela Chinna Reddy
- Succeeded by: Dr. Gillela Chinna Reddy
- Constituency: Wanaparthy

Personal details
- Born: 10 June 1958 (age 68) Kanaipally, Wanaparthy district Hyderabad State (now in Telangana)
- Party: Bharat Rashtra Samithi (2023- present)
- Other political affiliations: Telugu Desam Party (1982-2023)

Ravula Chandrasekhar Reddy is a politician from the Indian state of Telangana who is a former member of the legislative assembly representing Wanaparthy constituency in United Andhra Pradesh. He also served as a Member of Parliament of the Rajya Sabha from Mahbubnagar. He Joined th Bharat Rashtra Samithi (BRS) prior to the 2023 Telangana Legislative Assembly election

== Personal life ==
He hails from Kanaipally, Wanaparthy district, Telangana state. He is the brother of Dr. Ravula Ravindranath Reddy, ex-MLA for Alampur constituency.

== Political career ==
He joined Telugu Desam Party (TDP) in 1982. He was elected as an MLA of Wanaparthy in 1994 Andhra Pradesh elections and 2009 Andhra Pradesh elections. He won twice on ex Minister G. Chinna Reddy. He served as the Member of Parliament, Rajya Sabha from Mahbubnagar. He was the Telugu Desam Party candidate in the 2018 Telangana elections. He was the general secretary of the TDP Telangana state unit until he joined the BRS.

Year	Election	Constituency	Party	Opponent	Majority	Result
1985	Andhra Pradesh Legislative Assembly election	Wanaparthy	INC	A.Balakrishnaiah - TDP	11,458	Lost
1989	Andhra Pradesh Legislative Assembly election	Wanaparthy	INC	A.Balakrishnaiah - TDP	27,875	Won
1994	Andhra Pradesh Legislative Assembly election	Wanaparthy	INC	Chandra Shekar - TDP	21,982	Lost
1999	Andhra Pradesh Legislative Assembly election	Wanaparthy	INC	Chandra Shekar - TDP	3,353	Won
2004	Andhra Pradesh Legislative Assembly election	Wanaparthy	INC	Kandoor Lavanya - TDP	3,975	Won
2009	Andhra Pradesh Legislative Assembly election	Wanaparthy	INC	Chandra Shekar - TDP	10,568	Lost
2014	Telangana Legislative Assembly election	Wanaparthy	INC	Singireddy Niranjan Reddy - TRS	4,291	Won
2018	Telangana Legislative Assembly election	Wanaparthy	INC	Singireddy Niranjan Reddy - TRS	51,685	Lost
2021	Telangana Legislative Council	Hyderabad-Ranga Reddy-Mahbubnagar Graduate	INC	Surabhi Vani Devi - TRS		Lost
