= Gadwal sari =

Handcrafted woven sari style

Gadwal Sari
- Geographical indication
- Type: Handicraft
- Area: Gadwal, Jogulamba Gadwal district, Telangana
- Country: India
- Material: Silk

Gadwal sari is a handcrafted woven sari style in Gadwal of Jogulamba Gadwal district in the Indian state of Telangana. It was registered as one of the geographical indication from Telangana by the Geographical Indications of Goods (Registration and Protection) Act, 1999. They are most notable for the Zari on the saris. The sari consists of a cotton body, silk border, and zari pallu. with silk pallu which is also given a new name Sico saris. The weave is so light that the saree can be packed in a matchbox. The Brahmotsavas of Tirupati begins with the deity's idol being adorned with Gadwal Saree.

== Gadwal Handloom Centre ==
Gadwal Handloom Centre, established in 1946 by the late Ratan Babu Rao, was mainly responsible for the widespread knowledge and detail regarding the Gadwal Sari.

== See also ==
- Ilkal saree
- Mysore silk
