= G. Chinna Reddy =

Indian politician

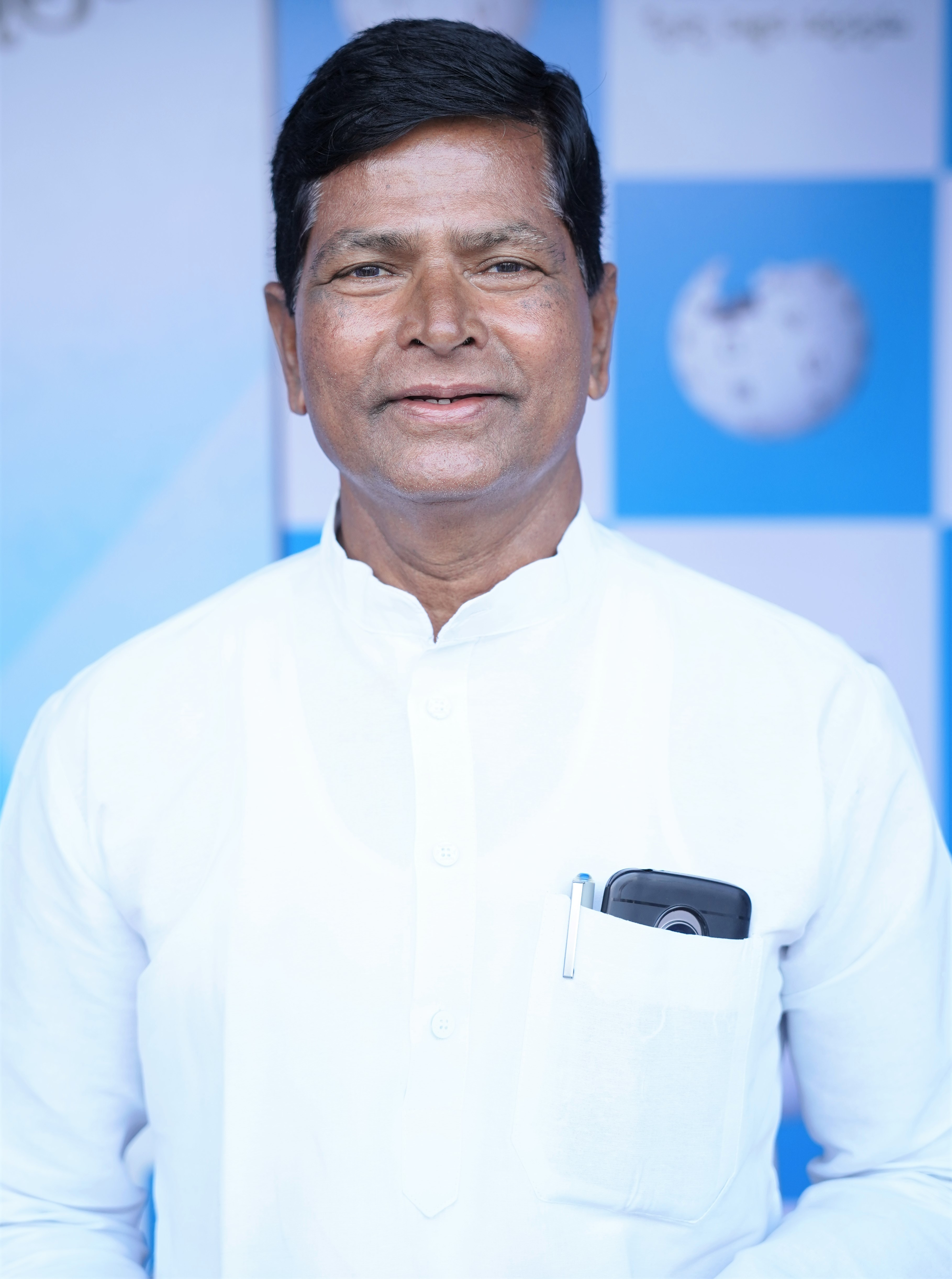

Vice Chairman Telangana State Planning Board
- Incumbent
- Assumed office 2024 February 24 - Incumbent
- Preceded by: B. Vinod Kumar

Member of Telangana Legislative Assembly
- In office 2014–2018
- Preceded by: Ravula Chandra Sekar Reddy
- Succeeded by: Singireddy Niranjan Reddy
- Constituency: Wanaparthy

Minister for Rural Development Government of Andhra Pradesh
- In office 20 April 2007 – 25 May 2009
- Governor: N. D. Tiwari
- Chief Minister: Y. S. Rajasekhara Reddy

Member of Legislative Assembly Andhra Pradesh
- In office 1999–2009
- Preceded by: Ravula Chandra Sekar Reddy
- Succeeded by: Ravula Chandra Sekar Reddy
- Constituency: Wanaparthy
- In office 1989–1994
- Preceded by: Dr. A. Balakrishnaiah
- Succeeded by: Ravula Chandra Sekar Reddy
- Constituency: Wanaparthy

Personal details
- Born: 7 July 1956 (age 70) Jayanna Tirumalapur, Gopalpet mandal, Wanaparthy district
- Party: INC
- Spouse: Rama
- Children: Aditya Reddy, anurag reddy

Gillella Chinna Reddy (born 7 July 1956) is an Indian politician from Telangana state. He is a senior member of Indian National Congress and won Wanaparthy Assembly constituency seat for four times and served as minister for Rural Development in undivided Andhra Pradesh.

== Early life and education ==
G. Chinna Reddy was born on 7 July 1956 in Jayanna Tirmalapur Village, Gopalpet Mandal, Mahabubnagar, Telangana. He completed his doctoral degree (Ph.D.) from the University of Pertanion Malaysia In 1986 and completed his Bachelor of Laws (LLB) from Osmania University in 2000.

== Political career ==
G. Chinna Reddy served as President of the Students Union at Zilla Parishad High School, Wanaparthy in 1966-67 and later joined in Congress party and held the position of General Secretary of AP Youth Congress from September 1980 to February 1983. He unsuccessfully contested as an MLA in 1985 from Wanaparthy and In 1989 he contested as MLA from Wanaparthy Constituency and won for the first time.

Chinna Reddy represented as Mla from 1989 to 1994, 1999–2004, 2004–2009, and 2014-2018 and he has held the position of minister for Rural Development in undivided Andhra Pradesh from 26 April 2007 to 20 May 2009 in Y. S. Rajasekhara Reddy ministry. In 2021 he unsuccessfully contested as Congress candidate for the Hyderabad-Ranga Reddy-Mahbubnagar graduate MLC constituency.

Chinna Reddy's name was announced In 2023 Telangana Legislative Assembly elections as MLA candidate for Wanaparthy initially but later withdrawn by Congress and later on 24 February 2024 he was appointed as Vice Chairman for Telangana State Planning Board (TSPB).

== Party positions held ==
- Telangana PCC Disciplinary Committee Chairman
- Telangana PCC Telangana Formation Day celebrations committee

== Elections contested ==
Year	Election	Constituency	Party	Opponent	Majority	Result
1985	Andhra Pradesh Legislative Assembly election	Wanaparthy	INC	A.Balakrishnaiah - TDP	11,458	Lost
1989	Andhra Pradesh Legislative Assembly election	Wanaparthy	INC	A.Balakrishnaiah - TDP	27,875	Won
1994	Andhra Pradesh Legislative Assembly election	Wanaparthy	INC	Chandra Shekar - TDP	21,982	Lost
1999	Andhra Pradesh Legislative Assembly election	Wanaparthy	INC	Chandra Shekar - TDP	3,353	Won
2004	Andhra Pradesh Legislative Assembly election	Wanaparthy	INC	Kandoor Lavanya - TDP	3,975	Won
2009	Andhra Pradesh Legislative Assembly election	Wanaparthy	INC	Chandra Shekar - TDP	10,568	Lost
2014	Telangana Legislative Assembly election	Wanaparthy	INC	Singireddy Niranjan Reddy - TRS	4,291	Won
2018	Telangana Legislative Assembly election	Wanaparthy	INC	Singireddy Niranjan Reddy - TRS	51,685	Lost
2021	Telangana Legislative Council	Hyderabad-Ranga Reddy-Mahbubnagar Graduate	INC	Surabhi Vani Devi - TRS		Lost
