= Pangal, Wanaparthy =

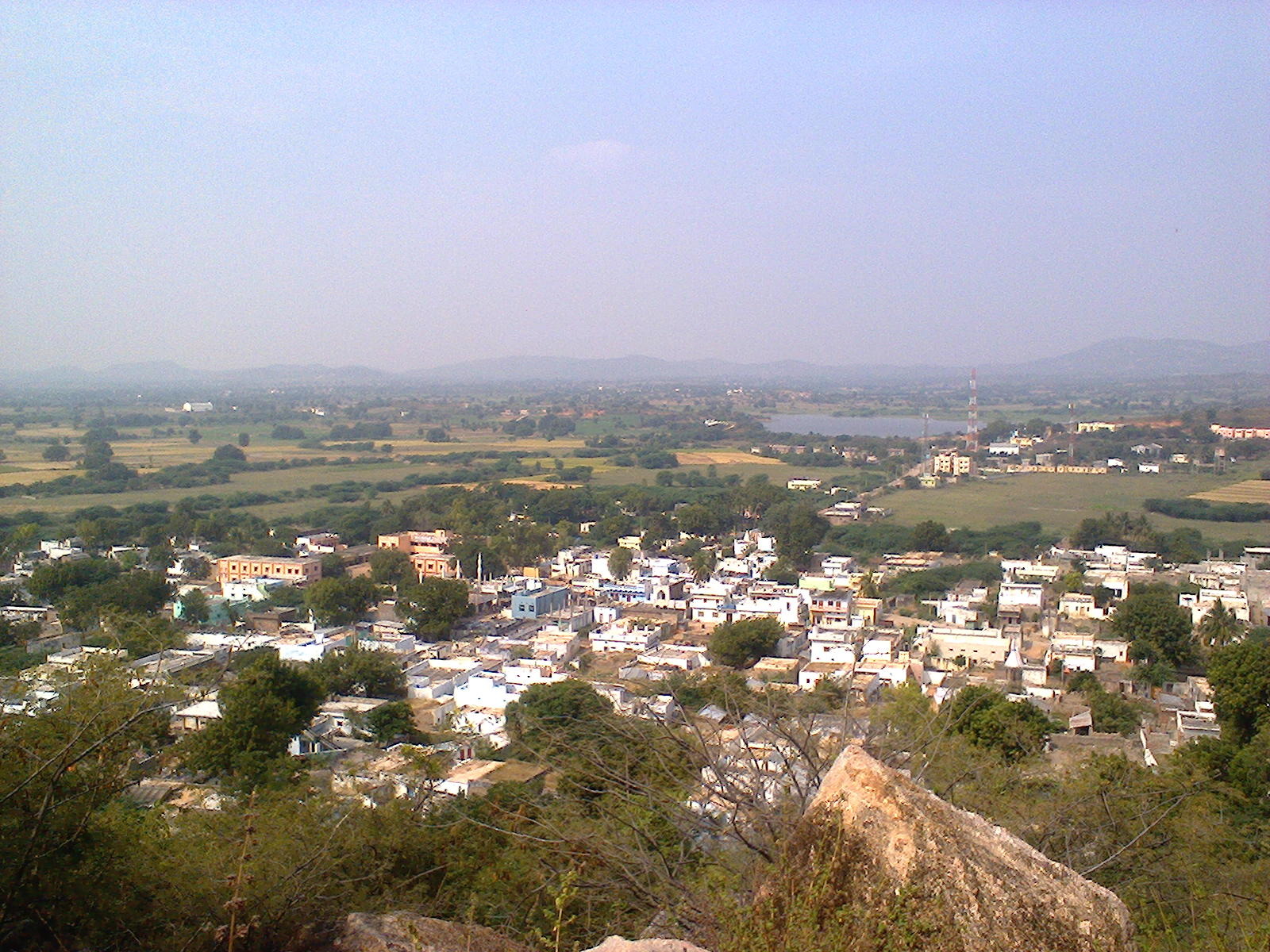
Aerial view of Panagal village

Pangal is a mandal in Wanaparthy District of Telangana in India.

The surrounding mandals are Wanaparthy and Kollapur. Villages in the mandal include Chintakunta, Mallayipally, Dondaipally, Annaram, Davajipally, Gopalpur, and Remaddula.

The mandal's population is 60303 as per 2011 census calculation. Male population is 31034. female population is 29269.
