= Reddy =

Hindu agrarian caste in Andhra Pradesh and Telangana

- Classification: Forward caste
- Religions: Hinduism
- Languages: Telugu
- Country: India
- Populated states: Major: Andhra Pradesh; Telangana; Minor: Karnataka; Kerala; Odisha; Tamil Nadu; Maharashtra
- Region: South India
- Ethnicity: Telugu
- Kingdom (original): Reddi Kingdom

Reddy (Note: Telugu pronunciation: [ɾeɖːi]) (also transliterated as Reddi or Raddi; also known as Reddiar or Reddappa) is a Telugu Hindu caste predominantly found in the states of Andhra Pradesh and Telangana in South India. They are classified as a forward caste.

The origin of the Reddy caste has been linked to the Rashtrakutas, although opinions vary. They were feudal overlords and peasant proprietors. Historically they have been the land-owning aristocracy of the villages. Traditionally, they were a diverse community of merchants and cultivators. Their prowess as rulers and warriors is well documented in Telugu history. The Reddi dynasty (1325–1448 CE) ruled coastal and central Andhra for over a hundred years. Today they continue to be a politically and socio-economically dominant group in the Telugu states of Telangana and Andhra Pradesh.

== Etymology ==
The Telugu term "Reddi", whose earlier forms were "Raddi", "Rattodi", and "Rattakudi", linked to the Sanskrit term "Rashtrakuta", was used for village headmen, who were responsible for organising the cultivation of the agricultural lands of the villages and collecting taxes. From the seventh century, some of the members of the Rattakudi families had important posts in the administration of the kingdoms. A copperplate record mentioned the grandfather of the founder of the dynasty as a sainya-nayaka, a commander of the forces.

== Origin theories ==
According to Alain Daniélou and Kenneth Hurry, the Rashtrakuta and Reddi dynasties may both have been descended from the earlier dynasty of the Rashtrikas. This common origin is by no means certain: there is evidence suggesting that the Rashtrakuta line came from the Yadavas in northern India and also that they may simply have held a common title. Either of these alternative theories might undermine the claim to a connection between them and the Reddis.

== Varna status ==
The varna designation of Reddys is a contested and complex topic. Even after the introduction of the varna concept to South India, caste boundaries in South India were not as marked as in North India, where the four-tier varna system placed the priestly Brahmins on top followed by the Kshatriyas, Vaishyas, and Shudras.

In South India, on the other hand, there existed only three distinguishable classes, the Brahmins, the non-Brahmins and the Dalits. The two intermediate dvija varnas—the Kshatriyas and Vaishyas—did not exist.

The dominant castes of South India, such as Reddys and Nairs, held a status in society analogous to the Kshatriyas and Vaishyas of the north with the difference that religion did not sanctify them, i.e. they were not accorded the status of Kshatriyas and Vaishyas by the Brahmins in the Brahmanical varna system.

Historically, land-owning castes like the Reddys have belonged to the regal ruling classes and are analogous to the Kshatriyas of the Brahmanical society. The Brahmins, on top of the hierarchical social order, viewed the ruling castes of the south like the Reddys, Nairs and Vellalars as sat-Shudras meaning shudras of "true being". Sat-shudras are also known as clean shudras, upper shudras, pure or high-caste shudras. This classification and the four-tier varna concept was never accepted by the ruling castes.

== History ==
=== Medieval history ===
==== Kakatiya period ====
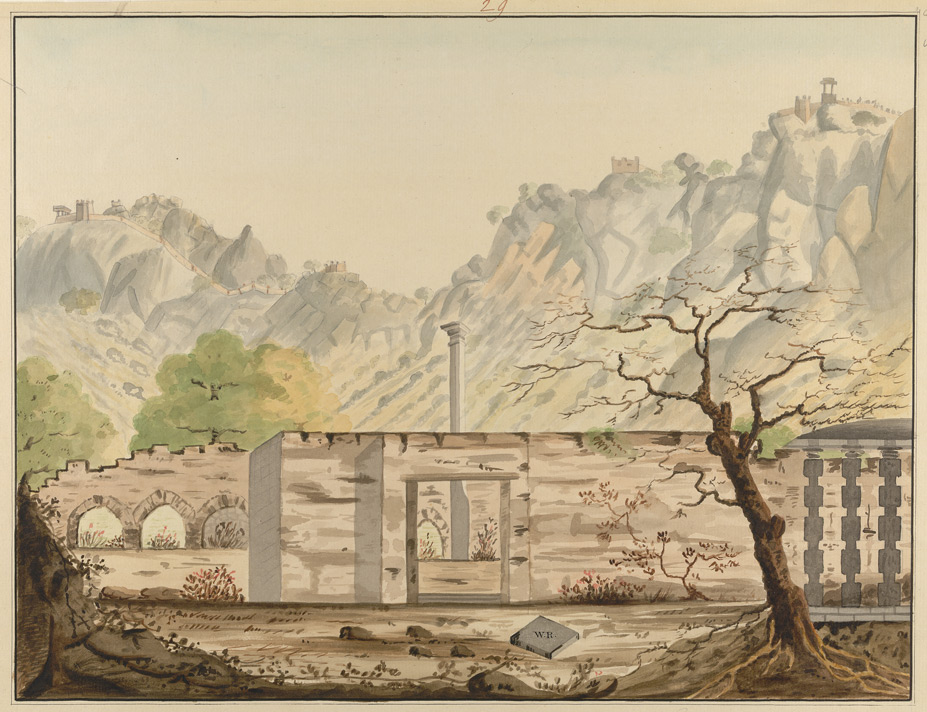
Water colour painting – Kondavidu fort, Reddi Kingdom

During the Kakatiya period, Reddi, together with its variant Raddi, was used as a status title (gaurava-vachakamu). The title broadly represented the category of village headmen irrespective of their hereditary background.

The Kakatiya prince Prola I (c. 1052 to 1076) was referred to as "Prola Reddi" in an inscription. After the Kakatiyas became independent rulers in their own right, various subordinate chiefs under their rule are known to have used the title Reddi. Reddi chiefs were appointed as generals and soldiers under the Kakatiyas. Some Reddis were among the feudatories of Kakatiya ruler Pratapa Rudra. During this time, some of the Reddis carved out feudal principalities for themselves. Prominent among them were the Munagala Reddi chiefs. Two inscriptions found in the Zamindari of Munagala at Tadavayi, two miles west of Munagala—one dated 1300 CE, and the other dated 1306 CE show that the Munagala Reddi chiefs were feudatories to the Kakatiya dynasty. The inscriptions proclaim Annaya Reddi of Munagala as a chieftain of Kakatiya ruler Pratapa Rudra.

The Reddi feudatories fought against attacks from the Delhi sultanate and defended the region from coming under the Turkic rule. Eventually, the Sultanate invaded Warangal and captured Pratapa Rudra in 1323.

==== Reddi Kingdom ====
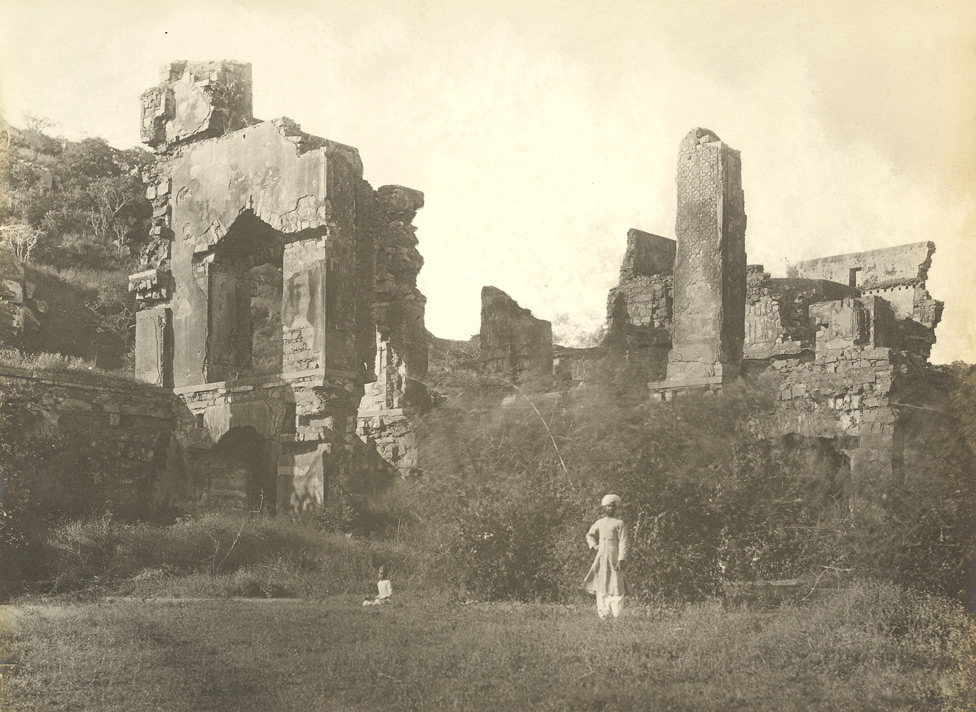
Palace ruins, Kondapalli fort, Reddi Kingdom

After the death of Pratapa Rudra in 1323 CE and the subsequent fall of the Kakatiya empire, some Reddi chiefs became independent rulers. Prolaya Vema Reddi proclaimed independence, establishing a "Reddi dynasty" based in Addanki. He had been part of a coalition of Telugu rulers who overthrew the "foreign" Turkic rulers of the Delhi Sultanate.

The dynasty (1325–1448 CE) ruled coastal and central Andhra for over a hundred years.

==== Vijayanagara period ====
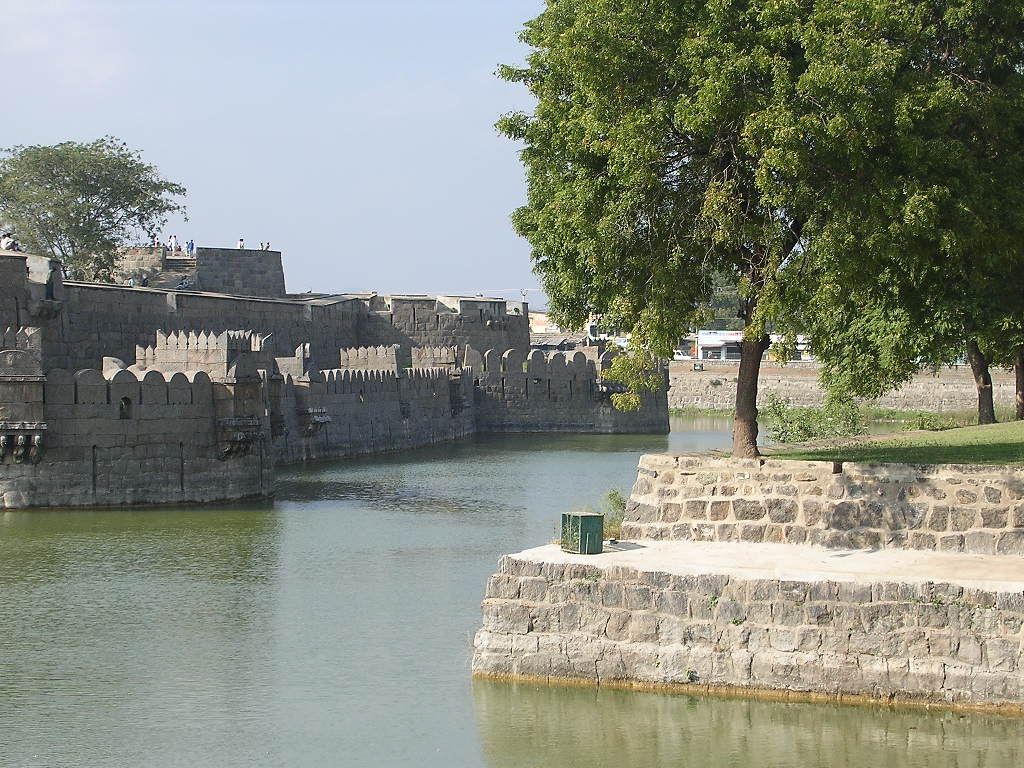
Vellore fort built by Bommi Reddi in the 16th century

The post-Kakatiya period saw the emergence of Vijayanagara Empire as well as the Reddi dynasty. Initially, the two kingdoms were locked up in a territorial struggle for supremacy in the coastal region of Andhra. Later, they united and became allies against their common archrivals—the Bahmani sultans and the Recherla Velamas of Rachakonda who had formed an alliance. This political alliance between Vijayanagara and the Reddi Kingdom was cemented further by a matrimonial alliance. Harihara II of Vijayanagara gave his daughter in marriage to Kataya Vema Reddi's son Kataya. The Reddi rulers exercised a policy of annexation and invasion of Kalinga (modern day Odisha). However, the suzerainty of Kalinga rulers was to be recognised. In 1443 CE, determined to put an end to the aggressions of the Reddi Kingdom, the Gajapati ruler Kapilendra of Kalinga formed an alliance with the Velamas and launched an attack on the Reddi Kingdom. Veerabhadra Reddi allied himself with Vijayanagara ruler Devaraya II and defeated Kapilendra. After the death of Devaraya II in 1446 CE, he was succeeded by his son, Mallikarjuna Raya. Overwhelmed by difficulties at home, Mallikarjuna Raya recalled the Vijayanagara forces from Rajahmundry. Veerabhadra Reddi died in 1448 CE. Seizing this opportunity, Kapilendra sent an army under the leadership of his son Hamvira into the Reddi Kingdom, took Rajahmundry and gained control of the Reddi Kingdom. The Gajapatis eventually lost control after the death of Kapilendra, and the territories of the former Reddi Kingdom came under the control of the Vijayanagara Empire.

Later, Reddis became the military chieftains of the Vijayanagara rulers. They along with their private armies accompanied and supported the Vijayanagara army in the conquest of new territories. These chieftains were known by the title of Poligars. The Reddi poligars were appointed to render military services in times of war, collect revenue from the populace and pay to the royal treasury. The chieftains exercised considerable autonomy in their respective provinces. The ancestors of the legendary Uyyalawada Narasimha Reddy – who led an armed rebellion against the British East India company, were poligars. Reddis were historically dominant in the Rayalaseema region.

Once independent, the erstwhile chiefs of the Vijayanagara empire indulged in several internal squabbles for supremacy in their areas. This constant warring between powerful feudal warlords for fiefdoms and power manifests itself even in modern-day Rayalaseema in the form of a brutally violent phenomenon termed as “factionalism”, "factional violence" or simply "faction".

=== Modern history ===
==== Golkonda period ====
During this period, Reddys ruled several "samsthanams" (tributary estates) in the Telangana area. They ruled as vassals of Golkonda sultans. Prominent among them were Ramakrishna Reddy, Pedda Venkata Reddy and Immadi Venkata Reddy. In the 16th century, the Pangal fort situated in Mahbubnagar district of Andhra Pradesh was ruled by Veera Krishna Reddy. Immadi Venkata Reddy was recognised by the Golkonda sultan Abdullah Qutb Shah as a regular provider of military forces to the Golkonda armies. The Gadwal samsthanam situated in Mahbubnagar includes a fort built in 1710 CE by Raja Somtadari. Reddys continued to be chieftains, village policemen and tax collectors in the Telangana region, throughout the Golkonda rule.

==== British period ====
One of the most prominent figures from the community during the British period is Uyyalawada Narasimha Reddy. He challenged the British and led an armed rebellion against the British East India company in 1846. He was finally captured and hanged in 1847. His uprising was one of the earlier rebellions against the British rule in India, as it was 10 years before the famous Indian Rebellion of 1857.

Reddys were the landed gentry known as the deshmukhs and part of the Nizam of Hyderabad's administration. The Reddy landlords styled themselves as Desais, Doras and Patel. Several Reddys were noblemen in the court of Nizam Nawabs and held many high positions in the Nizam's administrative set up. Raja Bahadur Venkatarama Reddy was made Kotwal of Hyderabad in 1920 CE during the reign of the seventh Nizam Osman Ali Khan, Asaf Jah VII. Raja Bahadur Venkatarama Reddy was the first Hindu to be made kotwal of Hyderabad as in the late 19th and early 20th century, during the Islamic rule of the Nizams, the powerful position of Kotwal was held only by Muslims. His tenure lasted almost 14 years and he commanded great respect among the public for his outstanding police administration.

Several Reddys were at the forefront of the anti-Nizam movement. In 1941, communist leaders Raavi Narayana Reddy and Baddam Yella Reddy transformed the Andhra Mahasabha into an anti-Nizam united mass militant organisation and led an armed struggle against the Nizam's regime.

==== Reddy States (Zamindaris & Samsthanams) ====
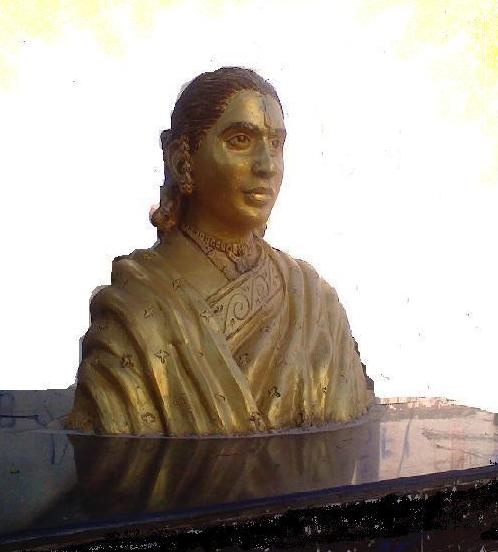
Maharani Adhilaxmi Devamma

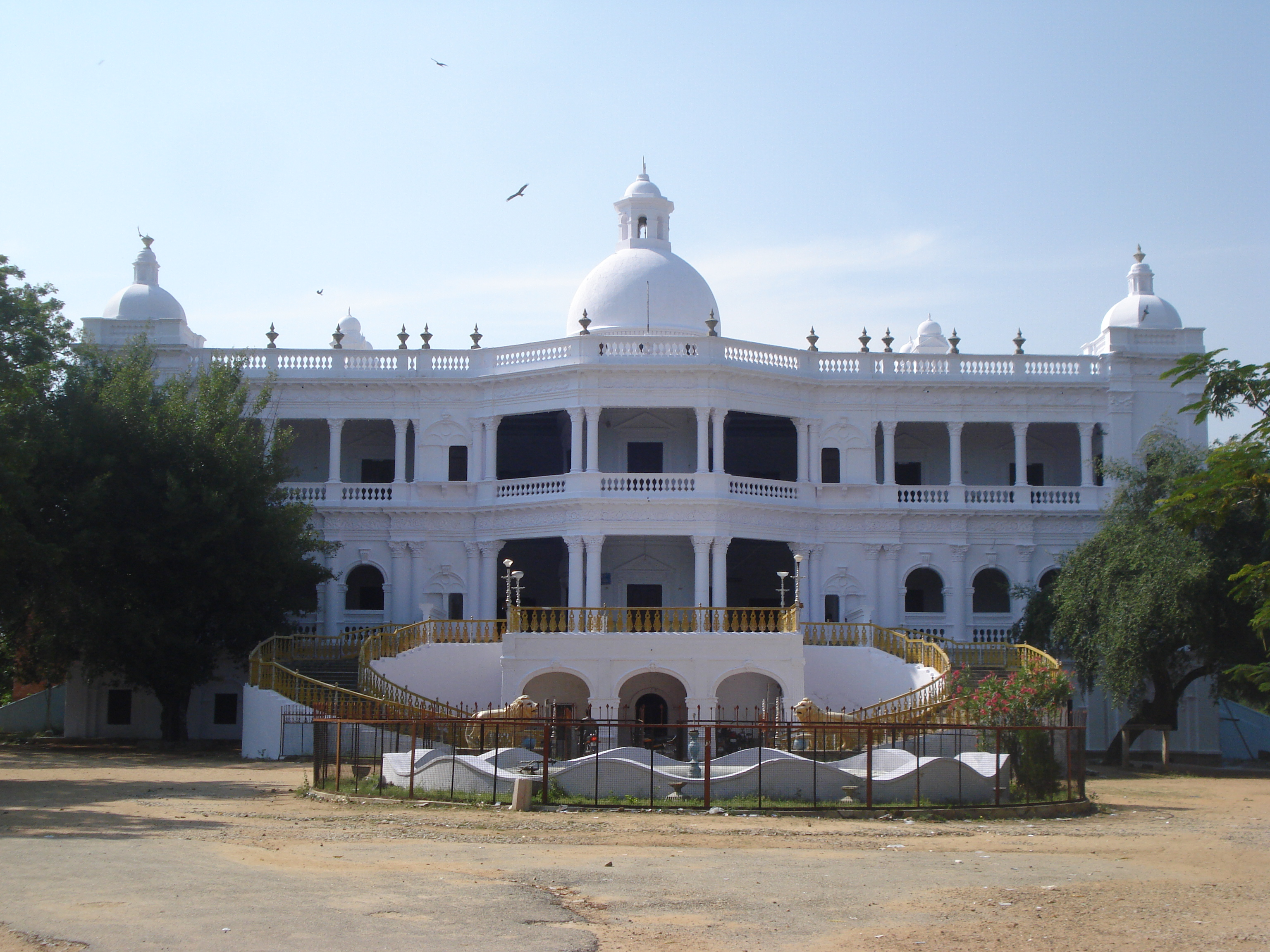
Wanaparthy Samsthanam's Palace

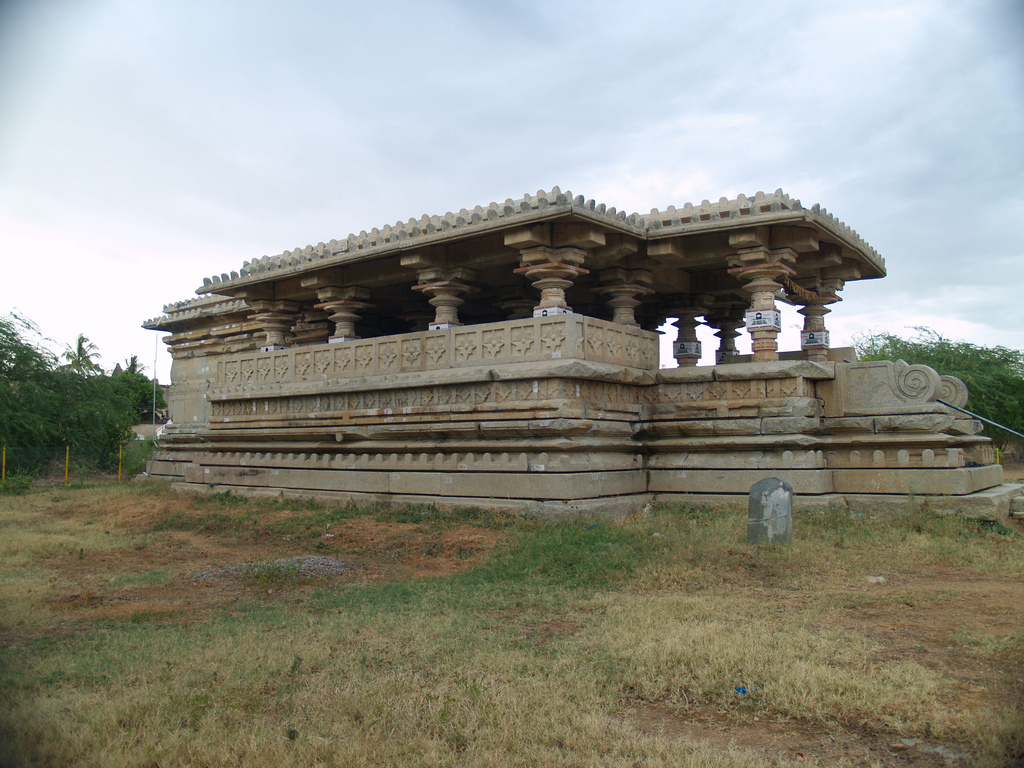
Temple in Domakonda Fort

During the medieval and later feudal/colonial periods, many parts of Andhra Pradesh and Telangana of the Indian subcontinent were ruled as sovereign or princely states by various dynasties of Reddy community.

Some of the prominent Reddy zamindaris (samsthanams):

- Atmakur Amarchinta Samsthanam, Telangana.
- Domakonda Samsthanam, Telangana.
- Gadwal Samsthanam, Telangana; —Raja Somasekhar Ananda Reddy or Somanadri
- Munagala—Gurlapaty clan Samsthanam, Telangana and Andhra Pradesh.
- Wanaparthy Samsthanam (originally known as Sugur), Telangana. Founded by Veera Krishna Reddy

== Modernity ==
The Reddy caste has been politically dominant prior to the formation of Andhra Pradesh in 1956 and afterwards. Reddys are classified as a Forward Caste in modern India's positive discrimination system and a politically dominant community in Telugu regions of Andhra Pradesh and Telangana, their rise having dated from the early 20th century of British Raj and Post Independence.

== Bibliography ==
- Somasekhara Sarma, Mallampalli (1946), History of the Reddi Kingdoms (Circa. 1325 A.D., to circa. 144B A.D.), Waltair: Andhra University – via archive.org
- Talbot, Cynthia (2001), Pre-colonial India in Practice: Society, Region, and Identity in Medieval Andhra, Oxford University Press, ISBN 978-0-19803-123-9
