= Chinnambavi =

Village and mandal in Telangana, India

- Village & Mandal
- Location in Telangana, India Chinnambavi (India)
- Coordinates: 16.027006°N 78.139154°E
- Country: India
- State: Telangana
- District: Wanaparthy

Languages
  - Official: Telugu
- Time zone: UTC+5:30 (IST)
- Vehicle registration: TS32
- Climate: hot (Köppen)
- Website: telangana.gov.in

Chinnambavi is a mandal and village in Wanaparthy district, Telangana, India.

== Villages ==
The villages in Chinnambavi mandal include:

1. Ammaipalle
2. Ayyavaripalle
3. Bekkam
4. Chellepahad
5. Chinnamarur
6. Chinnambavi
7. Dagadapalle
8. Gaddabaswapuram
9. Gudem
10. Kalloor
11. Koppunur
12. Lakshmipalle
13. Miyapuram
14. Peddadagada
15. Peddamarur
16. Velgonda
17. Vellatur
