= Nagapur =

Nagaapur
- Nanded
- Nagapur Taru
- Nickname: Nagapur
- Location in Maharashtra, India
- Coordinates: 19.16°N 74.70°E
- Country: India
- State: Maharashtra
- District: Ahmadnagar
- Elevation: 469 m (1,539 ft)

Population (2001)
  - Total: 7,062

Languages
  - Official: Marathi
- Time zone: UTC+5:30 (IST)
- Postal code: 414111

- Nagapur is a census town in Ahmadnagar district in the Indian state of Maharashtra.
- Nagapur is a part of the municipal corporation Ahmednagar. Nagapur is divided in two wards: Ward No.4 and Ward No.5. Most Residents in Nagapur are workers of the nearby company.
- In Nagapur, Ganpati festival and Navratri festival are celebrated.
- One of the most popular temples here is the temple of chakradhar swami. This temple is founded by Chakradhar Swami. Currently, Valhekar Maharaj looks after this temple. In this temple, KRISHN JANMUTSAV and RANGPANCHI UTSAV celebrate all people of Nagapur and nearby cities.
- Most people in Nagapur have the Sapre Bhor, Katore surnames.
- Geography
1. Nagapur is located at 19.16°N 74.70°E. It has an average elevation of 469 metres (1538 feet).
2. Nagapur situates near the Sina river and the Sher river. These rivers meet each other near Nagapur bridge.
3. Demographics

As of 2001 India census, Nagapur had a population of 7062. Males constitute 57% of the population and females 43%. Nagapur has an average literacy rate of 74%, higher than the national average of 59.5%: male literacy is 79%, and female literacy is 68%. In Nagapur, 15% of the population is under 6 years of age.
