= Revally =

- Village & Mandal
- Location in Telangana, India Revally (India)
- Coordinates: 16.371759°N 78.264857°E
- Country: India
- State: Telangana
- District: Wanaparthy

Languages
  - Official: Telugu
- Time zone: UTC+5:30 (IST)
- PIN: 509235
- Vehicle registration: TS32
- Climate: hot (Köppen)
- Website: telangana.gov.in

Revally is a mandal and village in Wanaparthy district, Telangana, India.

== Villages ==
The villages in Revally mandal include:

1. Bandaraipakula
2. Chennaram
3. Kesampeta
4. Shanaipalle
5. Thalpunur
6. Cheerkapalle
7. Nagapur
8. Revally
9. Vallabhanpalle
10. Konkalapalle
