= Veepanagandla =

- village
- Country: India
- State: Telangana
- District: Wanaparthy

Languages
  - Official: Telugu
- Time zone: UTC+5:30 (IST)
- Vehicle registration: TS32
- Climate: hot (Köppen)
- Website: telangana.gov.in

Veepanagandla (Telugu: వీపనగండ్ల) is a mandal and village in Wanaparthy district, Telangana.

== Villages ==
The 2016 Telangana districts reorganization removed 16 villages from Veepanagandla mandal and added 6 villages from Pangal mandal to Veepanagandla mandal. Below are the 11 villages in Veepanagandla mandal after the reorganization:

- Bollaram
- Gopaldinne
- Govardhanagiri
- Kalvarala
- Korlakunta
- Pulgarcherla
- Sampatraopalle
- Sanginepalle
- Toomkunta
- Vallabhapur
- Veepanagandla
- Rangawaram
- Vallabhapur tanda
- Nagarlabanda tanda
