= Gadwal =

- City
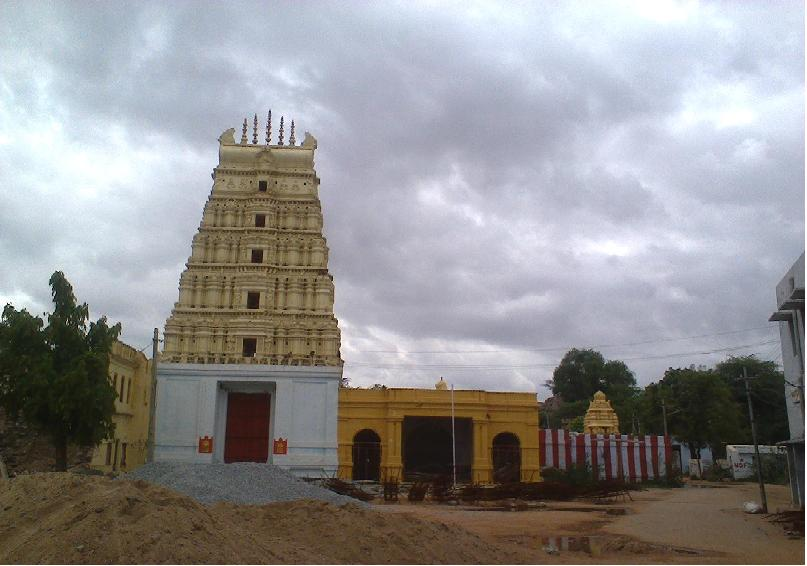
- Chennakesava Swamy temple in Gadwal Fort

- Location in Telangana, India Gadwal (India)
- Coordinates: 16.23°N 77.8°E
- Country: India
- State: Telangana
- Region: Deccan
- District: Jogulamba Gadwal
- Founder: Raja Nalla Somanadri

Government
  - Type: Gadwal municipal council
  - Body: Telangana Rastra Samithi
  - MLA: Bandla Krishnamohan Reddy(INC)
  - MP: Mallu Ravi(INC)
  - Collector & District Magistrate: B. M. Santosh, IAS
  - District Superintendent of Police: T. Srinivas Rao, IPS

Area
  - Total: 33.46 km^{2} (12.92 sq mi)
  - Rank: 1st in erstwhile district (Jogulamba Gadwal)
- Elevation: 324 m (1,063 ft)

Population (2015)
  - Total: 96,877
  - Density: 12,500/km^{2} (32,000/sq mi)

Languages
  - Official: Telugu
- Time zone: UTC+5.30 (IST)
- PIN: 509125
- Vehicle registration: TG-33
- Website: telangana.gov.in gadwalmunicipality.telangana.gov.in

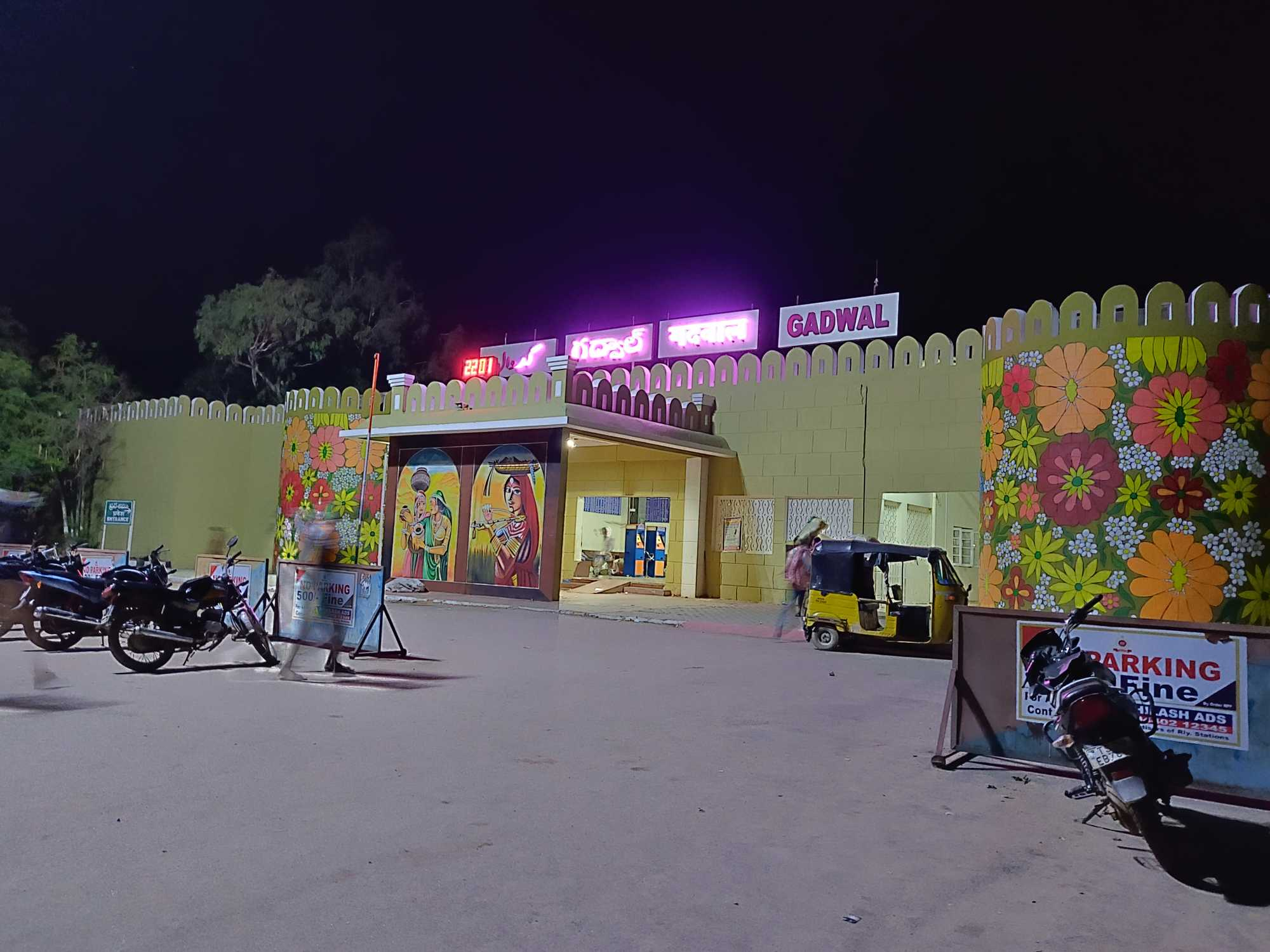

Gadwal is a City and the district headquarters of Jogulamba Gadwal district in the Indian state of Telangana. It is located 188 km (117 mi) from the state capital Hyderabad And 59 km From Kurnool and is a state assembly constituency. Gadwal historically served as the capital of Gadwal Samsthanam, a vassal of the Nizam of Hyderabad. Gadwal was previously a part of the Hyderabad State.

== Geography ==
Gadwal has an average elevation of 325 metres (1,066 ft). Gadwal's infrastructure includes a railway junction, river, government-owned land, a sub-collector office, national highway connectivity and brand image in the country. It is situated on the southern banks of Krishna river

== History ==
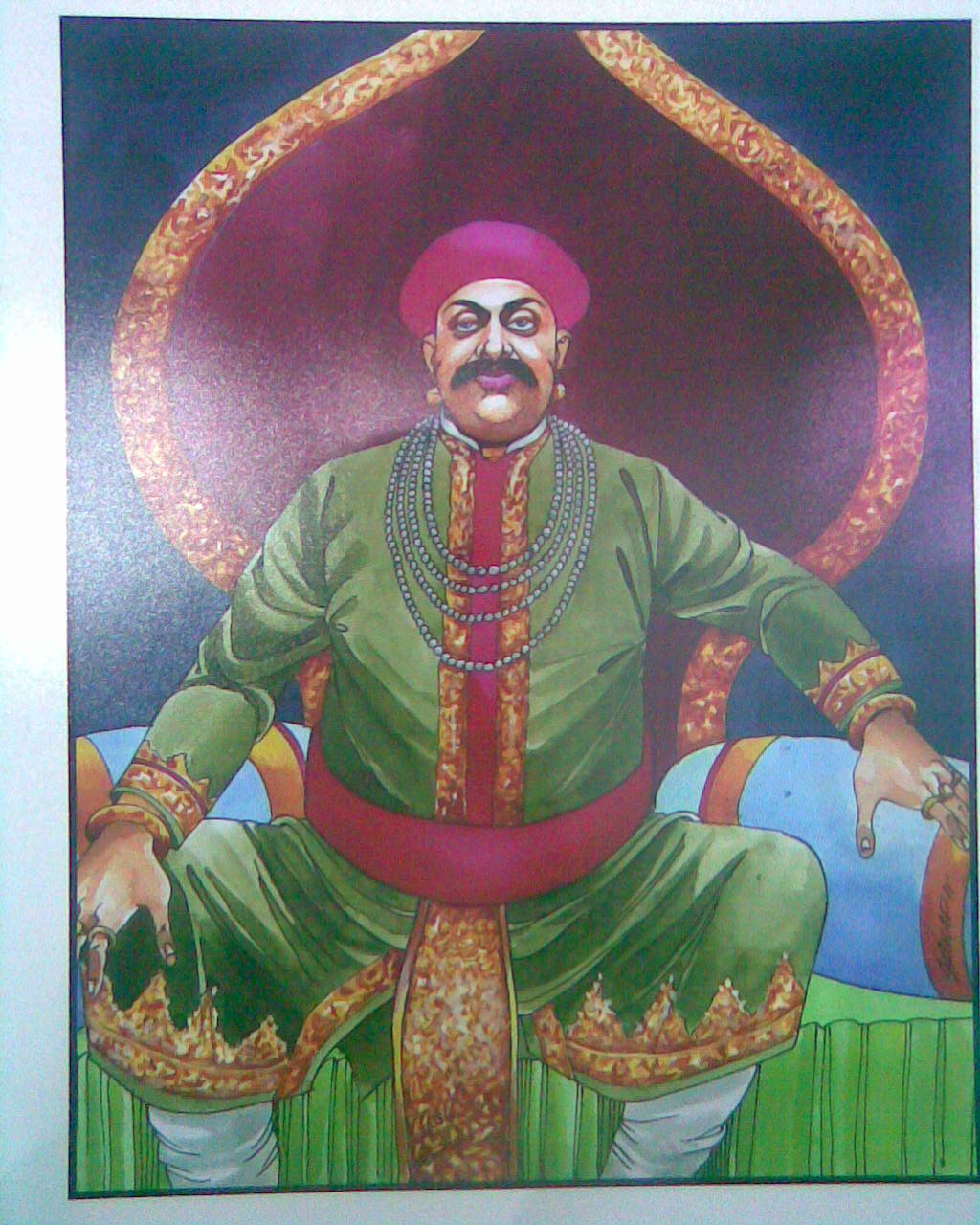
Somanadri

Gadwal developed around a fort built by the Gadwal ruler Sri Somashekar Ananda Bhopal Reddy known as Somanadri, Gadwal Samsthanam, which was a vassal of the Nizam of Hyderabad. It was protected by Mallichetti vamshiyulu. The Nagi Reddy, known today as Nagappa, was an Ayngarashakulu of Gadwal Samsthanam (Raja Somanadri was a minor). He died in a war with Sultans. Nagappa was succeeded by Narsappa as Gadwal Samsthanam Ayngarashakulu, but had to leave the palace.

== Demographics ==
As of 2001, Gadwal had a population of 53,560. Males constituted 51% of the population and females 49%. 13% of the population was under 6 years of age. As of 2011 this had risen to 63,177

== Landmarks ==
Gadwal Fort is an imposing structure around which the old town sprawls. The fort houses several old temples, the most important of which is Sri Chennakesava Swamy. Another well-known temple, Jammulamma, is located west of the city.

The Priyadarshini Jurala Project is a large dam under construction (as of 2017) near Gadwal. It has almost 62 gates, and its power generation capacity is 234 MW.

== Economy ==
=== Gadwal Saree ===
Gadwala is known for its handloom zari/jari chiralu (Gadwal sari). It was registered as one of the geographical indications from Telangana by Geographical Indications of Goods (Registration and Protection) Act, of 1999. They are most notable for the Zari on the saris. The sari consists of a cotton body with a silk pallu which is called Sico saris. The weave is so light that the saree can be packed in a matchbox. For Lord Venkateshwara Tirumala Tirupati Devasthanam (TTD) Bramhotsavam starts with Gadwala-weaved Pattu Vastralu every year.

== Transportation ==
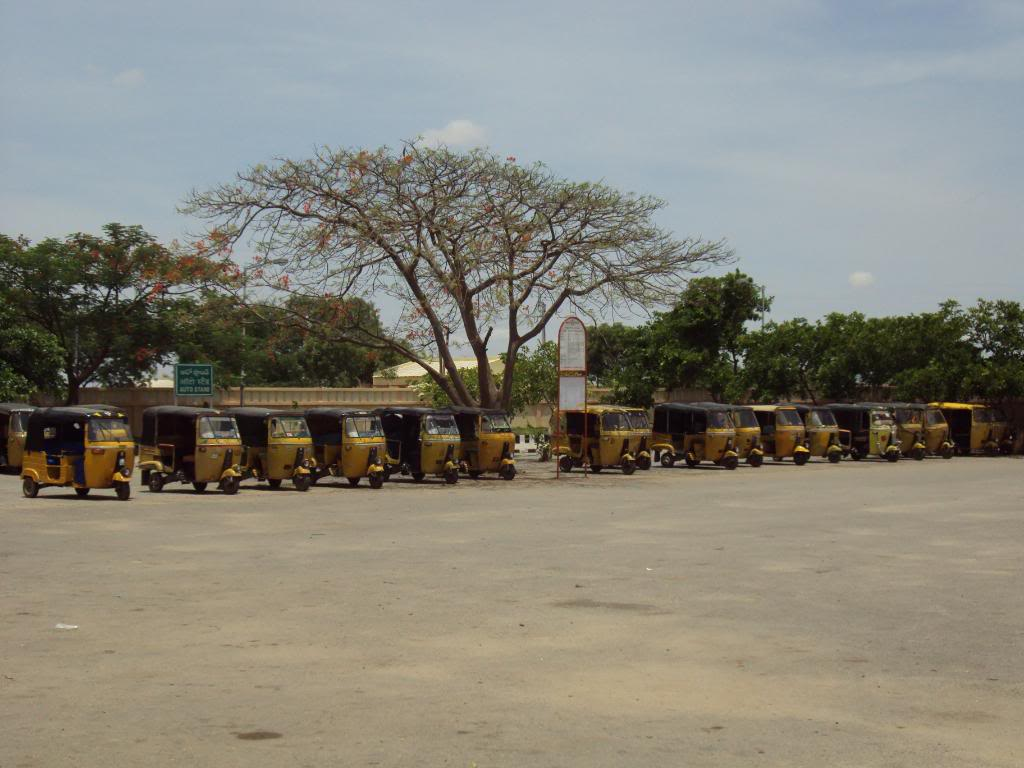
Auto-rickshaw stand outside Gadwal rail station

=== Rail ===
Gadwal has a rail junction connecting to other towns and cities, with more than 40 trains passing through daily. The railway station is on Secunderabad–Dhone section. Gadwal became connected by rail to Raichur, Karnataka, after commissioning of the new line on 12 October. Gadwal railway station is planned to become a four-line connecting junction with the addition of a Gadwal–Macherla line. The Railway Department has sufficient land to be used for new railway projects.

=== Road ===
Gadwal is located 15 kilometres (9.3 mi) from National Highway 44 (India) (formerly NH-7). A new national highway (Kothakota–Mantralayam) starts from Kothakota then reaches Gadwal, Ieeja, Gudur and Mantralayam. The newly sanctioned Yerravally–Raichur National highway also passes through Gadwal.

Telangana State Road Transport Corporation (TSRTC) runs bus services from Gadwal to major towns and villages.

=== Solar energy ===
With the Jurala Project, one of the most prestigious dams in India, 11 km (6.8 mi) away, the town has implemented solar energy for production of electricity.

== In popular culture ==
- 2009 Telugu film, Arundhati is set in Gadwal.
