= Peddamandadi =

- Mandal
- Country: India
- State: Telangana
- District: Wanaparthy

Languages
  - Official: Telugu
- Time zone: UTC+5:30 (IST)
- Vehicle registration: TS06
- Climate: hot (Köppen)
- Website: telangana.gov.in

Peddamandadi is a mandal in Wanaparthy district, Telangana.

== Institutions ==
- Zilla Parishad High School
- Government junior college
- Kasturibha Gurukula vidyalayam

== Villages ==
The villages in Peddamandadi mandal include:

- Alwal
- Chinnamandadi
- Dhodaguntapally
- Gatlakhanapur
- Jagathpally
- Maddigatla
- Mangampalli
- Manigilla
- Mojerla
- Pamireddipally
- Peddamandadi
- Veeraipally
- Veltoor
