= Singireddy Niranjan Reddy =

Indian politician

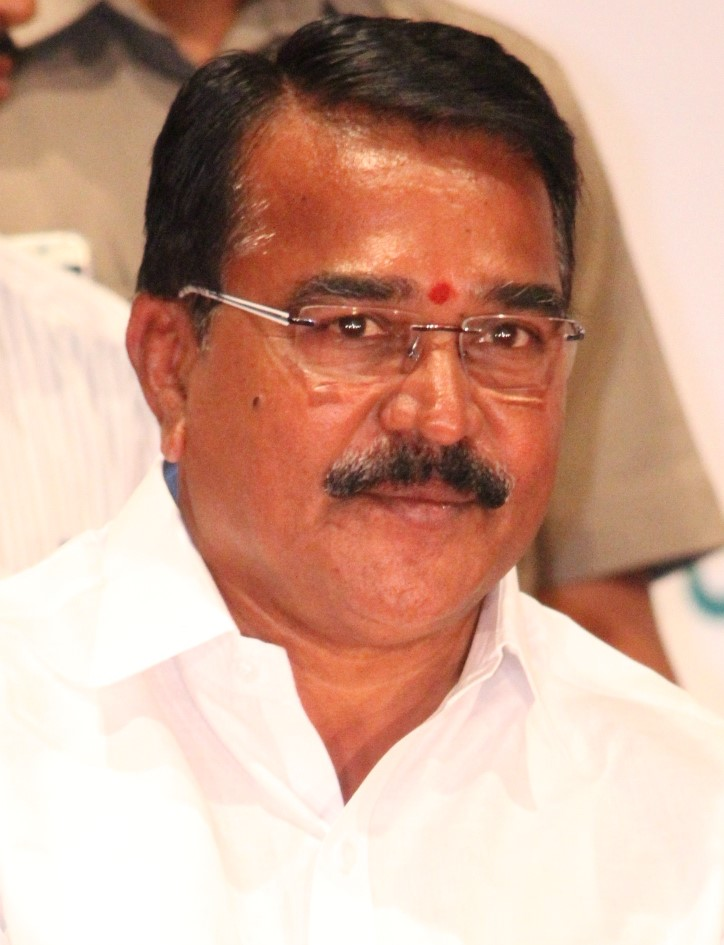
- Singireddy Niranjan Reddy

Minister of Agriculture and Co-operation Government of Telangana
- In office 19 February 2019 – 4 December 2023
- Preceded by: Pocharam Srinivas Reddy
- Succeeded by: Thummala Nageswara Rao

Personal details
- Born: 4 October 1958 (age 67) Pangal, Wanaparthy
- Party: Bharat Rashtra Samithi

Singireddy Niranjan Reddy (born 4 October 1958) is an Indian politician who served as the minister of agriculture, co-operation, and marketing of Telangana from 2019 to 2023. ex-MLA of Wanaparthy constituency in the Telangana Legislative Assembly. He is a politburo member of the Telangana Rashtra Samithi

== Early life ==
He was born in Wanaparthy District in Telangana to Ram Reddy, a farmer. He did his BSc and LLB from Osmania University.

== Career ==
Niranjan Reddy was a practicing lawyer before joining TRS party as a founding member in 2001.

=== Political career ===
- Singireddy Niranjan Reddy contested State Legislature from Kollapur in 2004 and Wanaparthy in 2014 but lost.
- He was appointed Vice Chairman, Telangana State Planning Board in December 2014.
- He contested State Legislature from Wanaparthy in 2018 elections and won by a margin of 51,685 votes. In 2023, in the Telangana assembly elections, INC's Megha Reddy Tudi, with 107115, defeated BRS's Singireddy Niranjan Reddy
- He worked as a cabinet minister from 2019 to 2023 for agriculture, marketing, cooperation, food & civil supplies, consumer affairs.
