= Domakonda =

- Village
- Location in Telangana, India
- Coordinates: 18.256089°N 78.437748°E
- Country: India
- State: Telangana
- District: Kamareddy

Languages
  - Official: Telugu
- Time zone: UTC+5:30 (IST)
- PIN: 503123
- Telephone code: 08468
- Vehicle registration: TG 17
- Lok Sabha constituency: Zaheerabad (Lok Sabha constituency)
- Vidhan Sabha constituency: Kamareddy

Domakonda is a village in the Kamareddy district of the Indian state of Telangana. It is located in Domakonda mandal.
