= Pebbair =

Pebbair పెబ్బేరు Pebberu
- Village
- Location in Telangana, India Pebbair (India)
- Coordinates: 16.2167°N 77.9833°E
- Country: India
- State: Telangana
- District: Wanaparthy
- Elevation: 300 m (980 ft)

Population
  - Total: 68,690 (Male 35,061 + Female 33,629)

Languages
  - Official: Telugu
- Time zone: UTC+5:30 (IST)
- Postal code: 509 104
- Telephone code: 08545
- Vehicle registration: TG 32
- Lok Sabha constituency: Nagar Kurnool
- Vidhan Sabha constituency: Wanaparthy
- Climate: Hot (Köppen)
- Website: telangana.gov.in

Pebbair (Telugu: పెబ్బేరు, romanized: Pebbēru) is a municipal corporation in Wanaparthy district, Telangana, India. The Pebbair Municipal corporation's northern end extends from Pampuram to its southern end in Yaparla.

== Geography ==
Pebbair is located at 16.2167°N 77.9833°E. It has an average elevation of 300 metres (987 feet).

== Community ==
Pebbair is a municipal corporation, with 29 villages. It has 15 schools, three junior colleges, two Degree colleges, one B. Ed, college, two D. Ed. colleges, and one polytechnic college for girls.

The farmer's Saturday market in Pebbair is well-known for its bullocks, Ongole oxen, sheep, and goats. People from across the state, as well from neighboring states like Andhra Pradesh, Karnataka, and Tamil Nadu, arrive to purchase cattle from the wide variety brought for sale.

Until the 1980s it was a drought prone area, but slowly emerged into a stable rice producer due to abundant water supply from the Jurala Project. Pebbair and the nearby areas produce fruits like mangoes, sapotas, watermelons in the summer, and custard apples in the winter.

Beechupally is a famous pilgrimage (devastanam) near Pebbair (10 kilometers) with Krishna River flowing through it. The historical hill (konda) called the Nizam Konda in middle of the river, which once had a fort, had the movie Kondaveeti Raja (starring Chiranjeevi) shot here. There are also two temples near Krishna River namely Rama and Hanuman temples. The Agriculture land in Pebbair is irrigated by Jurala Left Canal & Mahaboopal Pond.

Pebbair is located on highway No. 44 Old NH 7, longest highway in India running from Srinagar to Kanyakumari, 156 km South of Hyderabad towards Kurnool.

== Temples ==
Srirangapuram located 10 kilometers from Pebbair is famous for the Sri Ranganayaka Swamy Temple, where the movies AADI, Chatrapati, Chennakeshava Reddy, and Yamadonga were filmed. Pathapally village is famous for the Lord Hanuman Temple which is 8 kilometres from Pebbair. This Hanuman Temple is well known as Sri Chintakunta Anjaneya Swamy Temple.

Other Temples in Pebbair include the Shirdi Sai Baba, the Hanuman, Brahmamgari Temple, Santha bazar, Venugopala swamy, Ayyappa, Sri Sri Sri Mallishwari Devi Temple, Chowdeshwari Amma Vaaru, Sri Kodanda Rama Swamy Temple, Venkatapuram, this is one of the oldest temple and the Vasavi Kanyaka Parameswari. Every year people here celebrate the Chowdeshwari Jatara.

== Politics ==
Pebbair village has 4 MPTC seats and 16 wards. Akki Shusheela was elected on 31 July 2013 as a Sarpanch and Puru Padmavathi was elected as a MPP of Pebbair.

== Social media ==
Pebbair has a Facebook community, named "Pebbair Mandal", with over 1200 members and an Orkut community, named "Pebbair-our heaven", with over 150 members.

== Education ==
There are nearly 10 well established schools with a few hostel facilities. Among them are Sri Chaitanya Vidyalayam, Gandhi Public School, Saraswathi Vidyanikethan, Ragavendra Public School and MasterMind School. Pebbair has a private Junior College and a Government Junior College, and a B.Ed College is expected soon.

== Towns and villages ==
A list of all towns and villages in Pebbair Mandal of Wanaparthy district, Telangana. Shows name, administrative division, population, religion[data missing], literacy[data missing] and sex ratio[data missing] in tabular format.

Town or village	Administrative Division	Population
Ayyavaripalle	Pebbair	2,171
Bunyadpur	Pebbair	1,216
Burdipadu	Pebbair	803
Chelimilla	Pebbair	3,313
Erladinne	Pebbair	517
Gummadam	Pebbair	4,290
Janampeta	Pebbair	1,724
Janumpalle	Pebbair	969
Kamballapur	Pebbair	2,481
Kanchiraopalle	Pebbair	3,482
Munagamanudinne	Pebbair	256
Nagarala	Pebbair	2,351
Nagasanipalle	Pebbair	1,155
Pathapalle	Pebbair	1,522
Pebbair	Pebbair	12,289
Penchikalpadu	Pebbair	1,281
Ramammapeta	Pebbair	345
Ramapur	Pebbair	1,122
Rangapur	Pebbair	3,519
Shakhapur	Pebbair	3,205
Srirangapur	Pebbair	8,119
Sugur	Pebbair	4,049
Thatipamula	Pebbair	2,454
Thippaipalle	Pebbair	1,291
Thomalapalle	Pebbair	1,267
Venkatapur	Pebbair	1,657
Yaparla	Pebbair	1,842
