= Wanaparthy district =

Wanaparthy district వనపర్తి జిల్లా
- District of Telangana
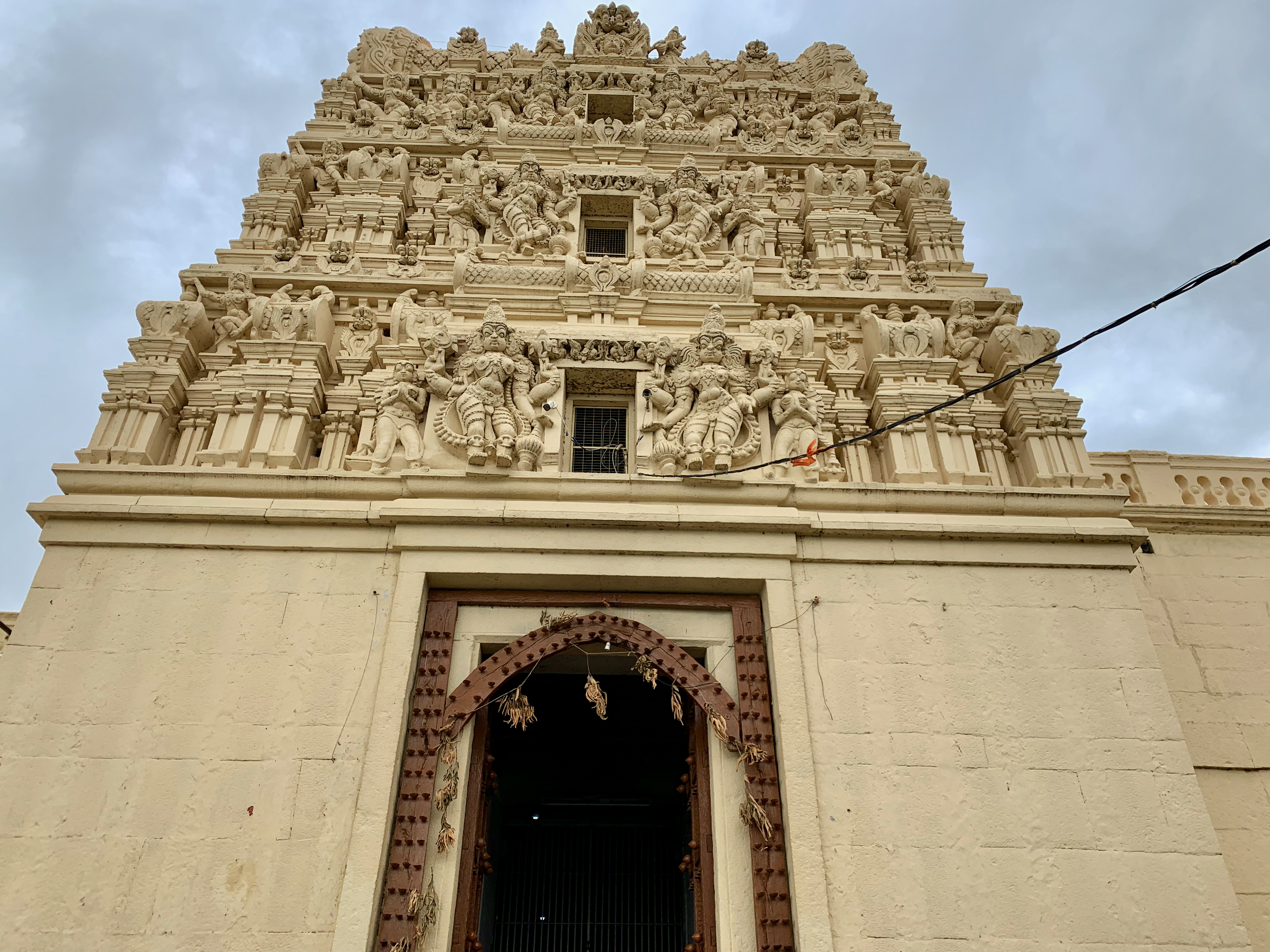
- Sri Ranganayaka Swamy Temple, Srirangapur

- Location in Telangana
- Wanaparthy district
- Coordinates (Wanaparthy): 16.363870°N 78.063403°E
- Country: India
- State: Telangana
- Mandalas: 10
- Headquarters: Wanaparthy

Area
  - Total: 2,152 km^{2} (831 sq mi)

Population (2011)
  - Total: 577,758
  - Density: 268.5/km^{2} (695.3/sq mi)

Demographics
  - Literacy: 55.67%
  - Sex ratio: 922
- Time zone: UTC+05:30 (IST)
- Vehicle registration: TG-32
- Average annual precipitation: 2014–15 556.7 mm
- Website: wanaparthy.telangana.gov.in

Wanaparthy district is a district in the India of Telangana. Its headquarters is Wanaparthy. The district shares boundaries with Gadwal, Mahabubnagar, Narayanpet, Nagarkurnool districts, as well as the state boundary of Andhra Pradesh.

== Geography ==
The district is spread over an area of 2,164.59 square kilometres (835.75 sq mi). Mahbubnagar district is situated in the north of this district, Nagarkurnool district in the east, Andhra Pradesh in the south and Jogulamba Gadwal district in the west.

== Demographics ==
Religion in Wanaparthy district (2011)
Hinduism	93.02%
Islam	6.00%
Christianity	0.40%
Buddhism	0.08%
Other or not stated	0.50%

As of 2011 Census of India, the district has a population of 577,758. Wanaparthy has a sex ratio of 960 females per 1000 males and a literacy rate of 55.67%. 72,377 (12.53%) were under 6 years of age. 92,288 (15.97%) lived in urban areas. Scheduled Castes and Scheduled Tribes made up 93,182 (16.13%) and 46,062 (7.97%) of the population respectively.

Languages of Wanaparthy district (2011)
1. Telugu (87.0%)
2. Lambadi (6.53%)
3. Urdu (5.70%)
4. Others (0.74%)

At the time of the 2011 census, 87.03% of the population spoke Telugu, 6.53% Lambadi and 5.70% Urdu aspoke s their first language.

== Administrative divisions ==
The district has one revenue division of Wanaparthy and is subdivided into 14 mandals. Tejas Nandlal Pawar is the present collector of the district. and Rakshitha K.Murthy is the present District Superintendent of Police Megha Reddy Tudi is the legislative leader of the Wanaparthy constituency. He won the 2023 general elections by a margin of 25,320 votes.

=== Mandals ===
The below table categorizes mandals into their respective revenue divisions in the district:

Sr No.	Wanaparthy revenue division
1	Amarchinta
2	Atmakur
3	Chinnambavi
4	Ghanpur (Khilla)
5	Gopalpeta
6	Kothakota
7	Madanapur
8	Pangal
9	Pebbair
10	Peddamandadi
11	Revally
12	Srirangapur
13	Veepanagandla
14	Wanaparthy
15	Yedula

== Notable personalities ==
- Aditya Hasan, Indian film director and writer
- Raghavendar Askani, anti-corruption activist and founder of the Youth Parliament Program and Swatantrata Center He was awarded the esteemed Karmaveer Chakra Award from the United Nations and ICONGO
- Kiran Rao an Indian film producer
- Aditi Rao Hydari, an Indian Actress
- Tudi Megha Reddy, politician from Indian National Congress, MLA for Wanaparthy constituency
- Singireddy Niranjan Reddy is a ex-Cabinet minister, Telangana (Agriculture, Marketing, Civil supplies, co-operation, consumer) and ex-MLA for wanaparthy constituency
- Ravula Chandra Sekar Reddy, politician from Bharat Rashtra Samithi and he is ex-MLA and member of Parliament from Telugu Desam Party
- Gillela Chinna Reddy, former MLA & minister from Indian National Congress, appointed as a Vice Chairman of the Telangana State Planning Board (TSPB)

== See also ==
- List of districts in Telangana
- Wanaparthy Assembly constituency
- Wanaparthy
