= Wanaparthy =

Town in Telangana, India

- Town
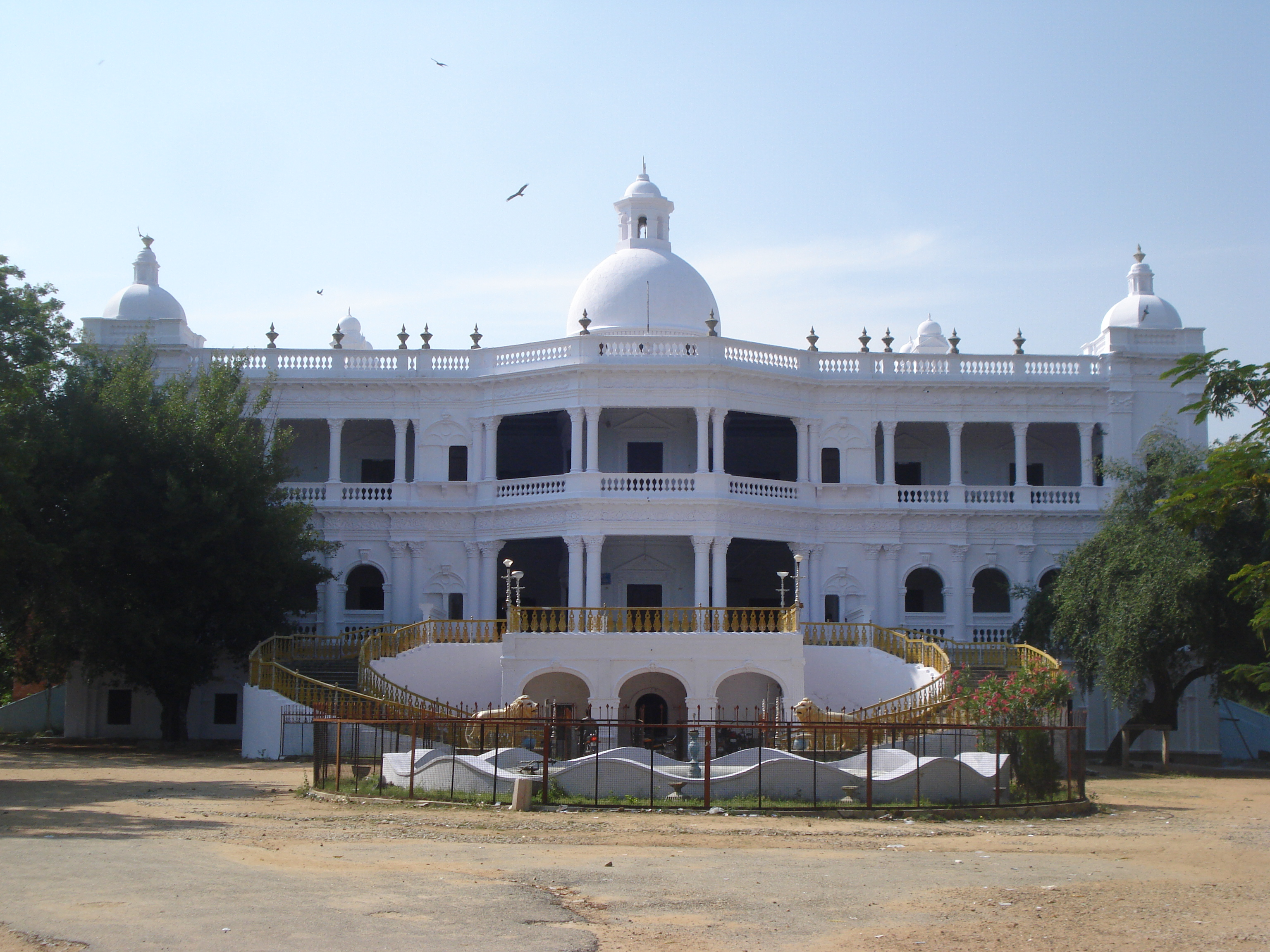
- Palace of the Raja of Wanaparthy

- Wanaparthy (Telangana) Wanaparthy (India)
- Coordinates: 16.362300°N 78.062200°E
- Country: India
- State: Telangana
- District: Wanaparthy

Government
  - Type: Wanaparthy municipal council
  - Body: Indian national congress
  - MLA: Tudi Megha Reddy Indian National Congress

Area
  - Total: 5.98 km^{2} (2.31 sq mi)
- Elevation: 424 m (1,391 ft)

Population (2011)
  - Total: 60,949
  - Density: 10,200/km^{2} (26,400/sq mi)

Languages,
  - Official: Telugu
- Time zone: UTC+5:30 (IST)
- 509103: 509 103
- Vehicle registration: TG 32
- Website: www.wanaparthy.telangana.gov.in wanaparthymunicipality.in

Wanaparthy is a town in the Wanaparthy district of Telangana, India. Wanaparthy Samsthanam was founded in 1512 AD, after the Kakatiya kingdom declined. In 1817 AD, the Suguru estate's capital was transferred to Wanaparthy Province in 1817 AD

Wanaparthy Spanning 11,319.83 hectares (27,970 acres), this reserve forest, akin to a small national park, safeguards biodiversity, protects ecosystems, and acts as a vital carbon sink, preserving wildlife and natural resources.

== History ==
Wanaparthy was governed by a feudal ruler, Rameshwar Rao II titled Raja of Wanaparthy as vassal of the Nizam of Hyderabad. Wanaparthy was one of the 14 major Zamindari segments in Telangana in post-independent India. Raja died on 22 November 1922. As his successor, Krishna Dev was a minor; his estate was managed by the court as his ward. Krishna Dev died before attaining adulthood, and the crown passed on to his son, Rameshwar Rao III. Soon after, India abolished all regal titles. Suravaram Pratapareddy entered politics from the Indian National Congress at the end of his life and was elected to the Hyderabad State Legislative. He won the first general election, and he became the first M.L.A. from Wanaparthy in 1952.

After the formation of the Telangana government, Wanaparthy is proposed as a district along with the other 14 new district proposals to the new government apart from the 10 existing districts. Wanaparthy District was formed in 2016 when Telangana was reorganized. It was created from parts of the former Mahabubnagar District.

The late Sri Raja Rameshwar Rao of Wanaparthy established K.D.R. Government Polytechnic College (KDRGP Wanaparthy), which was launched by India's first Prime Minister, Pandit Jawahar Lal Nehru, on the auspicious day of Vijay Dashimi on October 11, 1959, the first Polytechnic College in the state

Revanth Reddy, 2nd Chief Minister of Telangana due to political consciousness learned in Wanaparthy.

== Demographics ==
According to the 2011 Census of India, the town had a population of 60,949. The total population constituted 31,501 males, 29,448 females and 6,122 children (age group of 0–6 years). The average literacy rate was 77.91% with 42,713 literates, higher than the national average of 73.00%.

== Transport ==
The city is connected to major cities and towns by means of roads, railways, and airways. National and state highways that pass near the city are NH 44 and State Highway 21. TSRTC operates buses to various destinations from the town. Telangana capital Hyderabad is only 154 km from the wanaparthy.

=== Air ===
Rajiv Gandhi International Airport is only 131 km from the city.

=== Railway ===
The city has nearest railway station in serving, with the presence of Wanaparthy road railway station near by 29 km from the Wanaparthy Town

== Notable personalities ==
- Raghavendar Askani is a classical liberal and anti-corruption activist and founder of the Youth Parliament Program and Swatantrata Center He has been awarded the esteemed Karmaveer Chakra Award from the United Nations and ICONGO
- Aditi Rao Hydari, an Indian Actress
- Kiran Rao an Indian film producer
- Ravula Chandra Sekar Reddy is Politician from Bharat rashtra Samithi and he is ex-MLA and member of Parliament from Telugu Desam Party
- Gillela Chinna Reddy, former MLA & minister from Indian National Congress, appointed as a Vice Chairman of the Telangana State Planning Board (TSPB)
- Tudi Megha Reddy is a Politician from Indian National Congress, MLA for wanaparthy constituency
- Singireddy Niranjan Reddy is a ex-Cabinet minister, Telangana (Agriculture, Marketing, Civil supplies, co-operation, consumer) and ex-MLA for wanaparthy constituency

== Wanaparthy Samsthanam ==
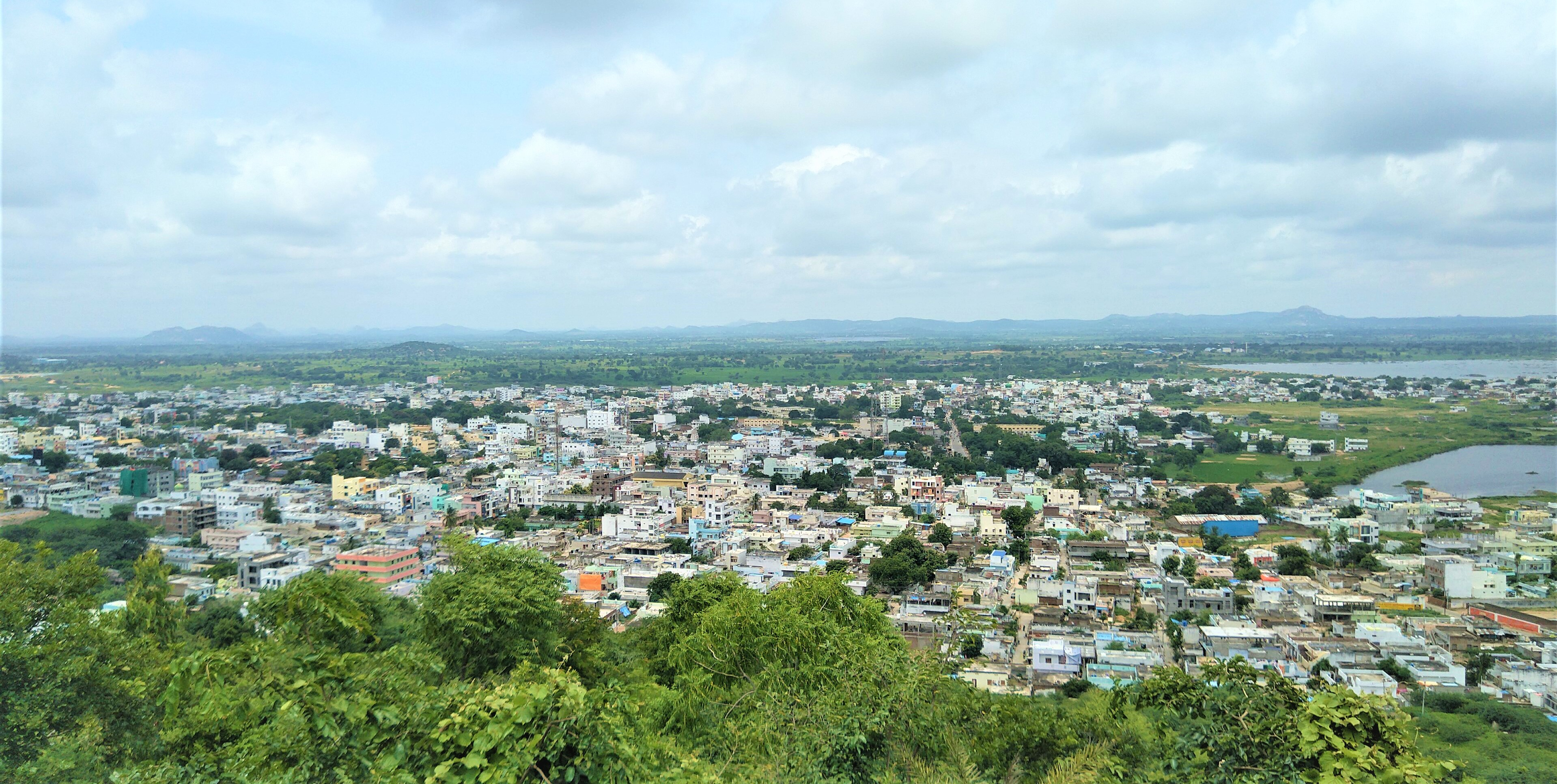
Wanaparthy Top view from Hill

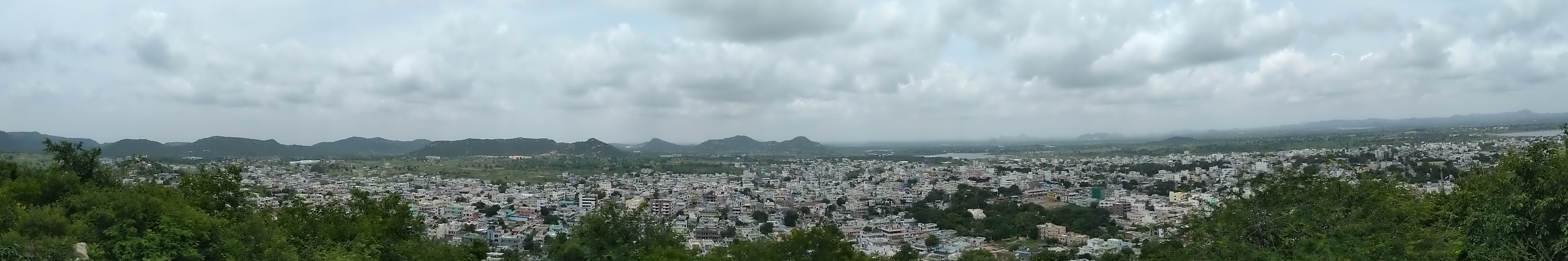
Wanaparthy Panorama view

Wanaparthy Samsthanam or Raja of Wanaparthya vassal of Nizam of Hyderabad. He controlled the feudatory of Wanaparthy. The palace's construction dates back to the late 19th century. It was known by various names, including "Ram Sagar Bungalow," "Palace of Wanaparthy," and "Mustafa Mahal. The Palace of Wanaparthy comprises around 640 square miles in area.
