= Narsapur Assembly constituency =

Constituency of the Telangana legislative assembly in India

Coordinates: 17.74°N 78.28°E

Narsapur
- Constituency No. 37 for the Telangana Legislative Assembly
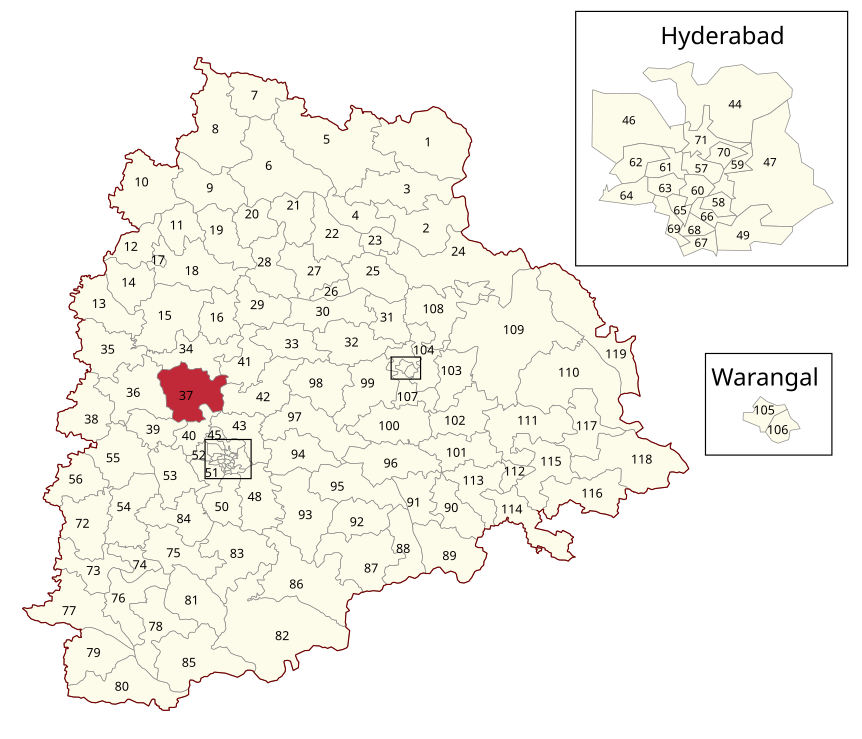
- Location of Narsapur Assembly constituency within Telangana

Constituency details
- Country: India
- Region: South India
- State: Telangana
- District: Medak
- Lok Sabha constituency: Medak
- Established: 1951
- Total electors: 1,99,626
- Reservation: None

Member of Legislative Assembly
- 3rd Telangana Legislative Assembly
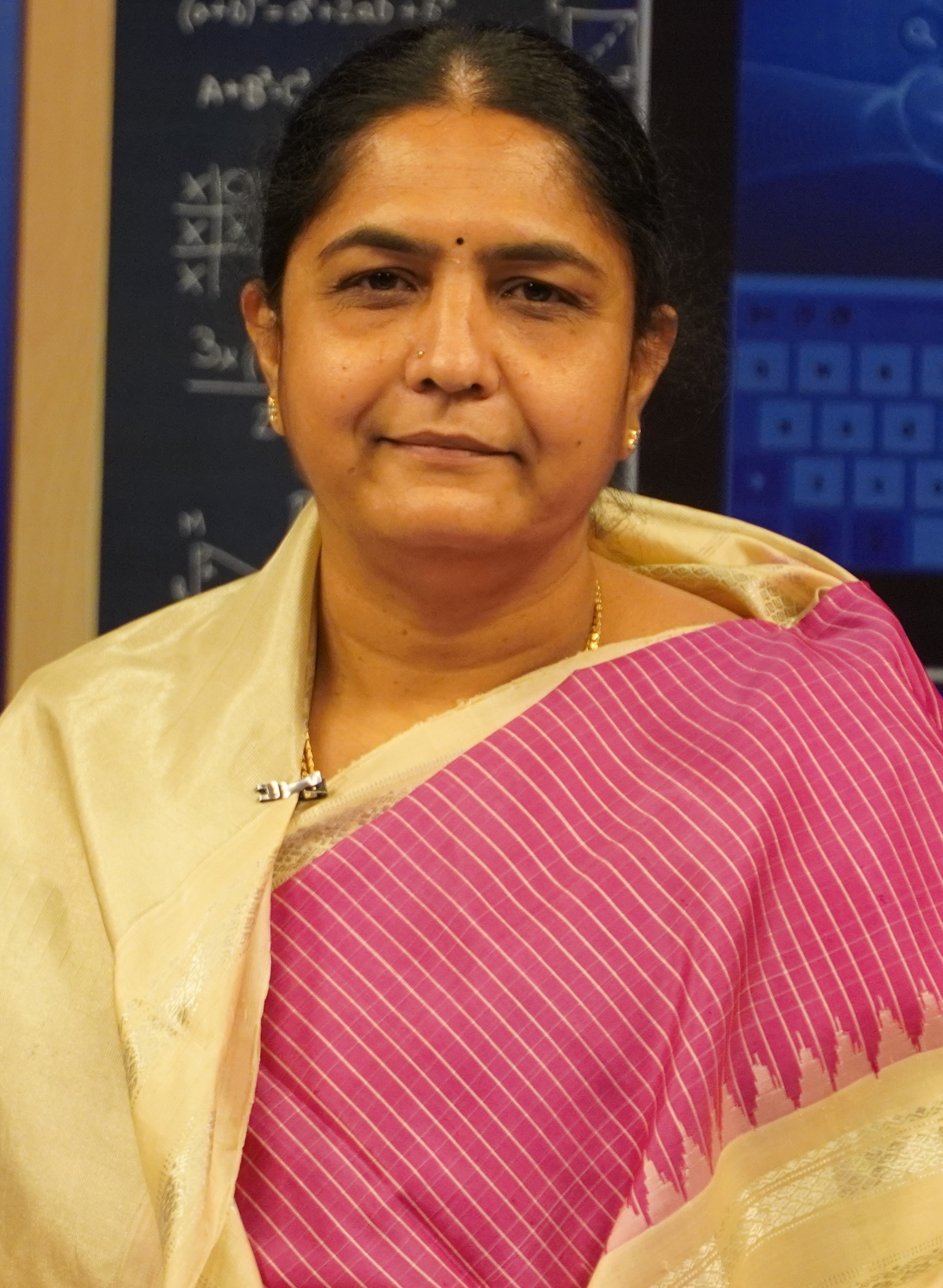
- Incumbent Vakiti Sunitha Laxma Reddy
- Party: Bharat Rashtra Samithi
- Elected year: 2023

Narsapur Assembly constituency is a constituency of Telangana Legislative Assembly, India. It is one of ten constituencies in Medak district. It is part of Medak Lok Sabha constituency.

Vakiti Sunitha Laxma Reddy of Bharat Rashtra Samithi is the sitting MLA of the constituency since 2023.

== Mandals ==
The Assembly Constituency presently comprises the following Mandals:

Mandal	Districts
Narsapur	Medak
Kulcharam	Medak
Yeldurthy	Medak
Shivampet	Medak
Kowdipalle	Medak
Hathnoora	Sangareddy
Chilipched	Medak

== Members of Legislative Assembly ==
Members of Legislative Assembly who represented Narsapur

Year	Winner	Party
Andhra Pradesh
1978	Chilumula Vithal Reddy	Communist Party of India
1983	Chowti Jagannath Rao	Indian National Congress
1985	Chilumula Vittal Reddy	Communist Party of India
1989	Chilumula Vittal Reddy	Communist Party of India
1994	Chilumula Vittal Reddy	Communist Party of India
1999	Vakiti Sunitha Laxma Reddy	Indian National Congress
2004	Vakiti Sunitha Laxma Reddy	Indian National Congress
2009	Vakiti Sunitha Laxma Reddy	Indian National Congress
Telangana
2014	Chilumula Madan Reddy	Telangana Rashtra Samithi
2018	Chilumula Madan Reddy	Telangana Rashtra Samithi
2023	Vakiti Sunitha Laxma Reddy	Bharat Rashtra Samithi

== Election results ==
=== Telangana Legislative Assembly election, 2023 ===
Telangana Assembly Elections, 2023: Narsapur (Assembly constituency)
Party	Candidate	Votes	%	±%
BRS	Vakiti Sunitha Laxma Reddy	88,410	44.64	
INC	Aavula Raji Reddy	79,555	40.17	
BJP	Arragolla Muralidhar Yadav	22,865	11.54	
NOTA	None of the Above	1,386	0.70	
Majority		8,855	4.47	
Turnout		1,98,062		
BRS hold		Swing		

=== Telangana Legislative Assembly election, 2018 ===
2018 Telangana Legislative Assembly election: Narsapur
Party	Candidate	Votes	%	±%
TRS	Chilumula Madan Reddy	105,665	57.54%	
INC	Sunitha Laxma Reddy	67,345	36.67%	
BJP	Singayapalli Gopi	2,848	1.55%	
NOTA	None of the Above	1,669	0.91%	
Majority		38,320		
Turnout		1,83,634	90.74%	
TRS hold		Swing		

=== Telangana Legislative Assembly election, 2014 ===
Telangana Assembly Elections, 2014: Narsapur (Assembly constituency)
Party	Candidate	Votes	%	±%
TRS	Chilumula Madan Reddy	85,890	49.02%	
INC	Sunitha Laxma Reddy	71,673	40.89%	
BJP	Chaganla Balvindernath	6,088	3.47%	
Majority		14,217		
Turnout		1,75,286	87.81%	
TRS gain from INC		Swing		

== See also ==
- List of constituencies of Telangana Legislative Assembly
