= Medak (disambiguation) =

Medak is a town in Telangana, India.

Medak may also refer to:

== Places ==
=== Related to Medak, India ===
- Medak Fort
- Medak district
- Medak mandal
- Medak Lok Sabha constituency
- Diocese of Medak of the Church of South India

=== Other places ===
- Medak, Croatia, a village near Gospić
- Medak, colloquial name for Medaković, Belgrade, Serbia

== Other uses ==
- Medak (surname)
- Ordnance Factory Medak, an Indian armoured vehicle manufacturer
  - Medak gun, a 30mm automatic cannon
