= List of villages in Medak mandal =

This is the list of villages in Medak mandal.

1. Rajpet
2. Burugupalle
3. Nagapur
4. Thimmaipalle
5. Anathasagar
6. Gangapur
7. Byathole
8. Lingasanpalle
9. Shalipet
10. Havelighanpur
11. Suklapet
12. Thogita
13. Bhogada Bhoopathipur
14. Mirgudpalle
15. Sardhana
16. Fareedpur
17. Muthaipalle
18. Serikuchanpalle
19. Kuchanpalle
20. Maqdumpur
21. Mudulwai
22. Medak Nagar Panchayath
23. Aurangabad[U]
24. Ausulpalle
25. Shamnapur
26. Pathur
27. Rayanpalle
28. Magta Bhoopathipur
29. Venkatapur
30. Pashapur
31. komtoor
32. Khazipalle
33. Rajpalle
34. Balanagar
35. Chityal
36. Rayalamadugu
37. Perur
