= Chilumula Vittal Reddy =

Indian politician (1914–2012)

Chilumula Vittal Reddy (1914–2012) was an Indian politician from the state of Telangana. He served five terms as a member of Andhra Pradesh Legislative Assembly. He was from Kowdipalle of the Medak district. He was one of the 67 legislators who resigned from assembly in 1966 demanding establishment of Vizag Steel plant.

== Career ==
He joined the Communist Party of India in the year 1954 and served as a sarpanch of Kowdipalle from 1956 to 1962.

He served as member of Andhra Pradesh legislative assembly in 1962–1967, 1978–1983, 1985–1989, 1989–1994, and 1994–1999 representing Narsapur Assembly constituency. His nephew Chilumula Madan Reddy also served as an MLA representing Narsapur.
