= Papannapet =

Papannapet పాపన్నపేట
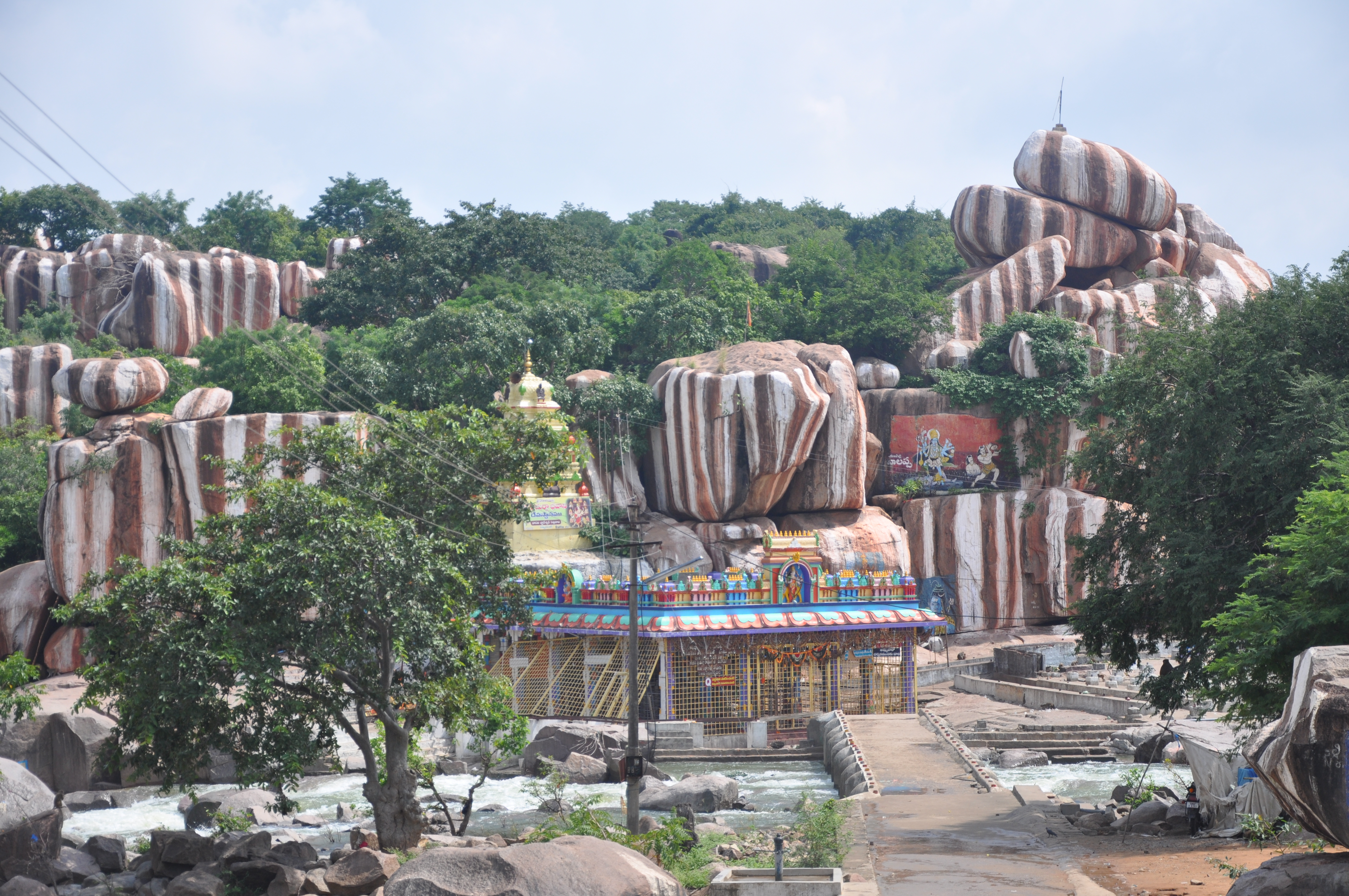
- Edupayala Durga Bhavani Temple

- Location in Telangana, India Papannapet (India)
- Coordinates: 18.0333°N 78.1000°E
- Country: India
- State: Telangana
- District: Medak
- Established: 1765
- Founder: Rani Shankaramma, 1765
- Named for: Merelli Papanna, Army commander
- Elevation: 445 m (1,460 ft)

Population (2011)
  - Total: 5,419

Languages
  - Official: Telugu, Urdu
- Time zone: UTC+5:30 (IST)
- PIN: 502303
- Vehicle registration: TS15
- Nearest city: Medak
- Lok Sabha constituency: Medak
- Vidhan Sabha constituency: Medak
- Website: telangana.gov.in

Papannapet is a village in Medak district of Telangana, India. It is bounded by Shankarampet-A, Tekmal, Kulcharam and Medak mandals of Medak district and Kamareddy district. Papannapet has an average elevation of 445 metres (1463 ft).

== History ==
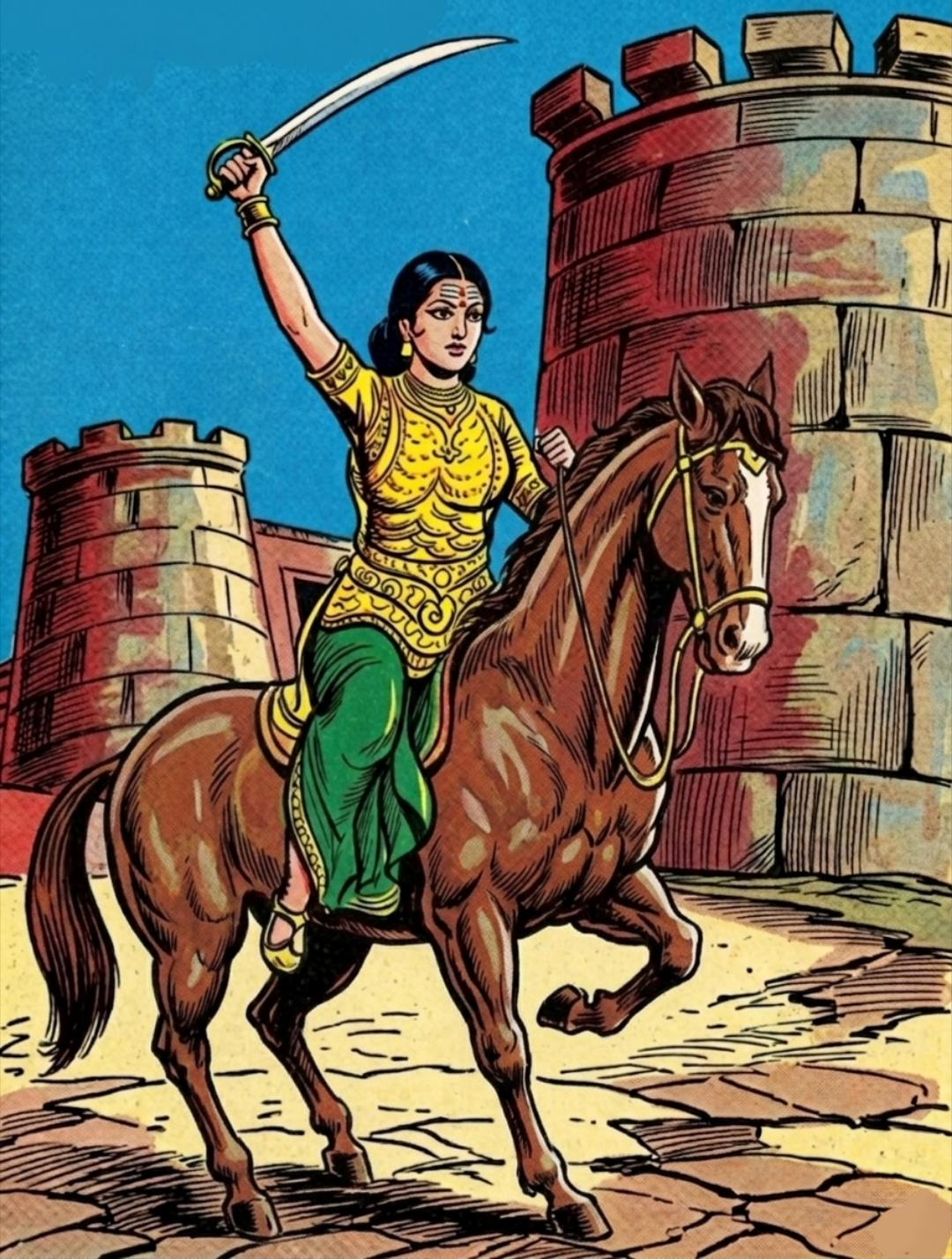

Rani Shankaramma

Erstwhile Papannapet Samsthanam covered almost entire undivided Medak district. In the history it was said as part of Andhol Rajyam with 24 paraganas and was ruled by the princess Rai Bagan Maharani Shankaramma, daughter of Sanga Reddy and Rajamma. She was born in 1702 at Gaudicherla Village. The ruler of Papannapet Samsthanam Ramadurga Venkata Narasimha Reddy (1720-1760) married her for her bravery. After the demise of Raja Narasimha Reddy in 1760, the power of Samsthanam went to in to the hands of Rani Lingayamma II (1760–64) with the prevailing political situations. When Peshwa of Maratha Empire invaded Nizam's territory, Rani Shankaramma countered them, for which she was honoured with Rai Bagan (Royal Tigress) title and was restored to power as Rani of Samsthanam in 1764. She then built Sangareddi, named after her father Sanga Reddy Rajampet, named after her mother Rajamma. She was also credited with the building of Shankarampet after her name and Papannapet named after Merelli Papanna. She adopted Sadashiva Reddy who married Parvathi Devi, daughter of Gadwal Samsthanam ruler Somanatha Bhupala. Sadashivapet was named after her adopted son Raja Sadashiva Reddy. Rani Shankaramma died in 1774. Papannapet Samsthanam, which was already in legal disputes by the early 20th century after the death of Raja Durga Reddy was merged into Hyderabad State in 1948, during the rule of Raja Ramachandra Reddy Bahadur.

In the history Rani Shankaramma was compared with Rani Ahilya Bhai and Rani Rudrama Devi by historians for her administrative skills and valour. She was credited with agricultural development such as constructing ponds and was regarded as a social reformer for her acts of making Neerudi Papanna, a dalit as commander. Many folkloric stories were sung describing her valour.

Historians such as B.N.Shastri said that Papannapet Samsthanam history is clearly recorded from the rule of Rani Shankaramma. Suravaram Prathapa Reddy mentioned Rani Shankaramma and Raja Sadashiva Reddy in "Golconda Patrika". Chidire Lakshmana Shastri who was the Raja purohit of Samsthanam published the history of Samsthanam titled "Medak Rajula Charitra" (1979–80) by gathering information from the books such as "Maa Poorva Vamshavali" by Rani Lingayamma, "Maa Vamsha Charitra" written in Urdu by Raja Venkata Narasimha Reddy, "Maa Samsthana Charitra", "Lingayamma Charitra" by Venkatadwari, Tirumalacharya's "Shaurya Rajya Vamshavali", "Shrimajjoginatha Charitra" by Mudigonda Ramakrishna Kavi. Mudunga Ranga Krishnamacharyulu wrote "Andhol-Jogipet"(2006–07) and "Shauryaveerya Reddy Thrayam" (2012) describing the Samsthanam. The history of Samsthanam is in circulation under the names "Andhol Rajula Charitra", "Medak Rajula Charitra", and "Rangampeta Charitra".

== Demographics ==
According to Indian census, 2011, the demographic details of this mandal are as follows:

- Total Population: 57,149 in 12,504 Households.
- Male Population: 27,767 and Female Population: 29,382
- Children Under 6-years of age: 6999 (Boys - 3,512 and Girls - 3,487)
- Total Literates: 25,805.

== Villages in Papannapet Mandal ==
1. Ablapur, 2. Annaram, 3. Arkela, 4. Arepally, 5. Cheekode, 6. Chitriyal, 7. Doulapur, 8. Ellapoor, 9. Enkepalle, 10. Gandharpalle, 11. Kodpaka, 12. Kompalle, 13. Kothapalle, 14. Kurthiwada, 15. Lingaipalle, 16. Mallampet, 17. Minpur, 18. Muddapur, 19. Nagsanpalle, 20. Namapur, 21. Narsingi, 22. Papannapet, 23. Podchenpalle, 24. Ramathirtham, 25. Thimmaipalle, 26. Yousufpet, 27. Lakshmi Nagar, 28. Machavaram, 29. Bacharam.

== Population in Papannapet Village ==
According to Indian census, 2011, Papannapet village has a population of 5,419 in 2011.

- Total Population: 5,419 in 1191 Households.
- Male Population: 2,610 and Female Population: 2,809
- Children Under 6-years of age: 570 (Boys - 276 and Girls - 294)
- Total Literates: 2,877.

== Culture ==
There is famous Edupayala Vana Durga Bhavani temple at Nagasanpalli Vby Mandal Papannapet. The temple maintenance was under family members of Peddalachannagari's under Nizam's rule and now it is under Endowment of the Telangana Government. Peddalachannagai Durga Reddy was the first chairman of the temple Trust board. Edupayala Jatara is considered to be the third-largest congregation of devotees after the Sammakka-Sarakka Jatara and Peddagattu jathara in Telangana. It was accorded state festival last year.
