= Chilumula =

Chilumula (Telugu: చిలుముల) is a Telugu surname. Notable people with the surname include:

- Chilumula Madan Reddy (born 1951), Indian politician
- Chilumula Vittal Reddy (1914–2012), Indian politician
