= Papannapet Samsthanam =

Indian vassal

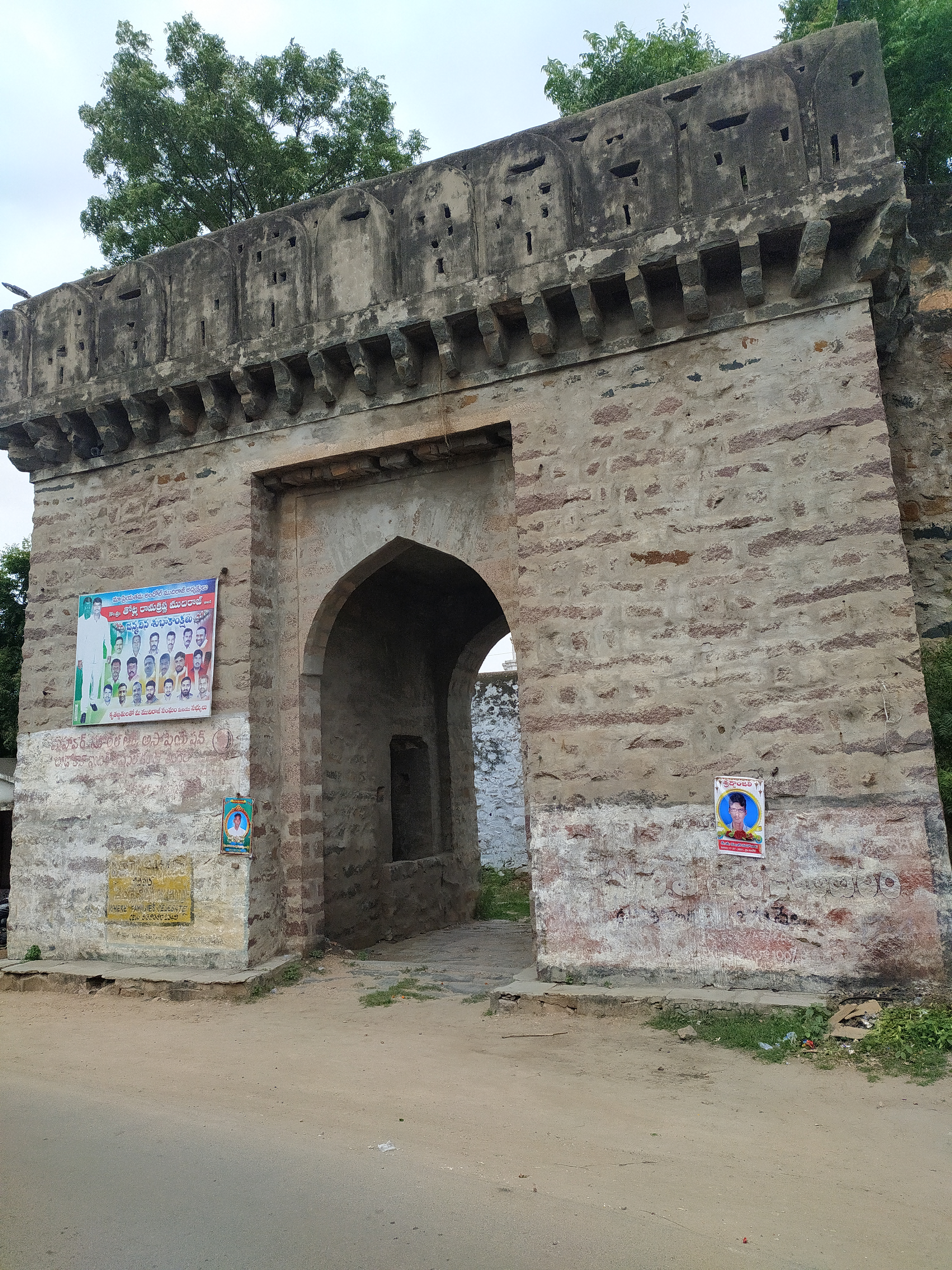
Andhole Gadi(Fort) Main Entrance

Raja of Papannapet or Papannapet Samsthanam was a semi-sovereign dynasty coming from the times of late/post-Kakatiyas and vassal of Nizam of Hyderabad, India. It was part of the undivided Medak district of Telangana state. The rulers of this Samsthanam had marital relations with famous Gadwal Samsthanam. Popular rulers of Samsthanam were Rai Bagan Maharani Shankaramma and Raja Sadashiva Reddy.

== Origin and History ==
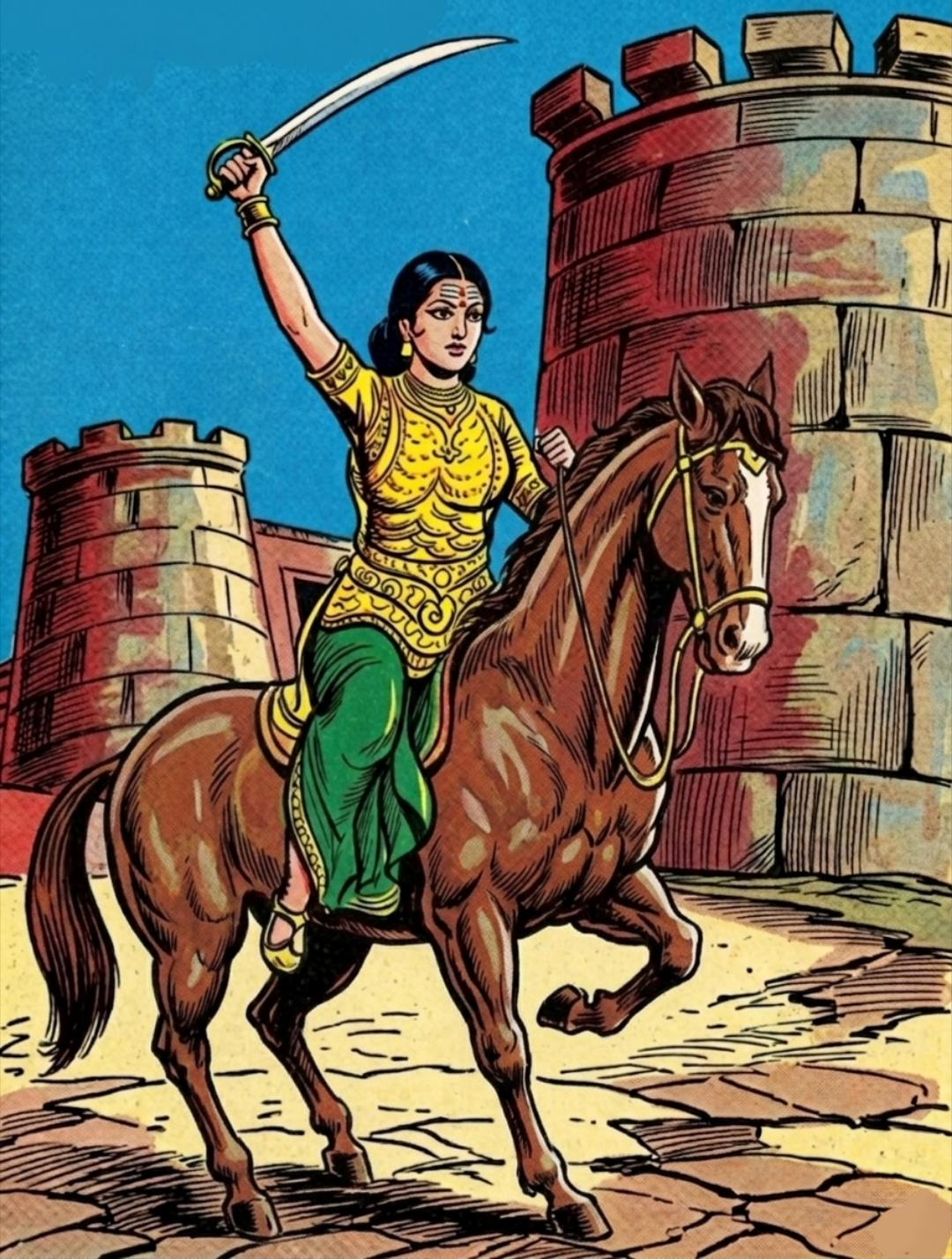
Rani Shankaramma

The rulers of the Papannapet Samasthanam belonged to the Reddy caste, and had marital relations with other Reddy Samasthanams like Gadwal Samasthanam.

Erstwhile Papannapet Samsthanam covered almost entire undivided Medak district. In the history it was said as part of Andhol Rajyam with 24 paraganas (administrative units) and was ruled by the princess Rai Bagan Maharani Shankaramma, daughter of Sanga Reddy and Rajamma. She was born in 1702 at Gaudicherla Village. The ruler of Papannapet Samsthanam Ramadurga Venkata Narasimha Reddy (1720–1760) married her for her bravery. After the demise of Raja Narasimha Reddy in 1760, the power of Samsthanam went into the hands of Rani Lingayamma II (1760–1764) with the prevailing political situations. When the peshwa (prime minister) of the Maratha Empire invaded Nizam's territory, Rani Shankaramma defeated them. She then built Sangareddi, named after her father Sanga Reddy Rajampet, named after her mother Rajamma. She was also credited with the building of Shankarampet after her name and Papannapet, named after Merelli Papanna. She adopted Sadashiva Reddy who married Parvathi Devi, daughter of Gadwal Samsthanam ruler Somanatha Bhupala. Sadashivapet was named after her adopted son, Raja Sadashiva Reddy. Rani Shankaramma died in 1774. Papannapet Samsthanam, which was already in legal disputes by the early 20th century after the death of Raja Durga Reddy, was merged into Hyderabad State in 1948, during the rule of Raja Ramachandra Reddy Bahadur.

In the history Rani Shankaramma was compared with Rani Ahilya Bai and Rani Rudrama Devi by historians for her administrative skills and valour. She was credited with agricultural development such as constructing ponds and was regarded as a social reformer for her act of making Neerudi Papanna, a dalit, as commander. Many folkloric stories were sung describing her valour.

Historians such as B. N. Shastri said that Papannapet Samsthanam history is clearly recorded from the rule of Rani Shankaramma. Suravaram Prathapa Reddy mentioned Rani Shankaramma and Raja Sadashiva Reddy in the journal Golconda Patrika. Chidire Lakshmana Shastri, who was the Raja purohit of Samsthanam, published the history of Samsthanam, titled Medak Rajula Charitra (1979–1980) by gathering information from books such as Maa Poorva Vamshavali by Rani Lingayamma, Maa Vamsha Charitra written in Urdu by Raja Venkata Narasimha Reddy, Maa Samsthana Charitra, Lingayamma Charitra by Venkatadwari, Tirumalacharya's Shaurya Rajya Vamshavali, Shrimajjoginatha Charitra by Mudigonda Ramakrishna Kavi. Mudunga Ranga Krishnamacharyulu wrote Andhol-Jogipet (2006–2007) and Shauryaveerya Reddy Thrayam (2012) describing the Samsthanam. The history of Samsthanam is in circulation under the names "Andhol Rajula Charitra", "Medak Rajula Charitra", and "Rangampeta Charitra".

== See also ==
- Rani Shankaramma
- Papannapet
- Lingampet
- Gadwal Samsthanam
- Wanaparthy Samsthanam
- Sirnapalli Samasthanam
- Recherla Reddis
- List of Reddy dynasties and states
- Gona Budda Reddy
