= Pocharam =

Pocharam may refer to:

- Pocharam, Medak district, a village in Telangana, India
- Pocharam Lake, a lake in Telangana, India
- Pocharam Wildlife Sanctuary, a forest in Telangana, India
- Pocharam Srinivas Reddy (born 1976), Indian politician
