= Kuchadri Venkateshwara Swamy Temple =

Religion
- Affiliation: Hinduism
- District: Medak district
- Deity: Lord Lord Balaji

Location
- Location: Kuchanpally village
- State: Telangana State
- Country: India
- Interactive map of Kuchadri Venkateshwara Swamy Temple
- Coordinates: 18.07309°N 78.23153°E

Kuchadri Venkateswara Swamy temple is an ancient Hindu temple of Lord Balaji in Kuchanpally village of Medak mandal of Medak district in Indian state of Telangana. In 2011 then government of andhra pradesh declared kuchadri temple as a protected monument.
