= Yeti Gadda Kistapur =

- Village
- Location in Telangana, India Yeti Gadda Kistapur (India)
- Coordinates: 18.1°N 78.85°E
- Country: India
- State: Telangana
- District: Medak
- Elevation: 675 m (2,215 ft)

Languages
  - Official: Telugu
- Time zone: UTC+5:30 (IST)
- PIN: 502301
- Telephone code: 08457
- Vehicle registration: AP23

Yeti Gadda Kistapur is a village in the Medak District in the Telangana state of India.

== Geography ==
This village also pronounced as Eti Gadda Kistapur. It is located at Latitude 17.91251 and Longitude 78.8136.
