= Mallinātha Sūri =

Sanskrit literary critic and poet (c. 1350 – c. 1450)

- Born: 1346 CE; Kolcharam, Medak District Telangana, India
- Died: 1440 CE
- Occupations: Poet, Critic, Commentator
- Writing career
- Genres: Religion, Literature, Philosophy
- Subjects: Sanskrit, Natyas

Mallinātha Sūri was a critic, known for his commentaries on the five mahakavyas (great compositions) of Sanskrit. During his times, he is said to have received the titles of Mahamahopadhyaya and Vyakhyana Chakravarti. He lived during the reigns of Rachakonda king Singabhupala and Vijayanagara king Deva Raya I. Based on the evidence from inscriptions, it is estimated that he lived between 1350-1450 CE.

== Early life ==
Mallinātha was born in a Telugu Brahmin family of the Kamakayanasa gotra with the surname Kolachala, Kolachela, Kolichala or Kolichelama. The village Kolichelama (currently known as Kolchāram) is near Medak, a village and mandal in the Medak District of Telangana. When Kākatīya rule ended, the scholars of the Kolachelama family migrated to Rāchakonḍa, the capital of Singabhūpāla. From the colophons of the Sanjīvani, it is known that Singabhūpāla honoured Mallinātha with the title of Mahāmahopādhyāya, and Mallinātha's younger son with the title of Mahopādhyāya. He had two sons, namely Peddibhatta and Kumaraswamin. Kolachalam Srinivasa Rao (1854-1919), a Telugu scholar of theatre, was a descendant of Mallinātha. Vinay Chandra Suri, perhaps a descendant of Mallinātha, wrote the Mallinātha Charita kavya, a biography of Mallinātha in verse.

== Works ==
Mallinātha is well known as a commentator who has written glosses on the Classical epics of the Sanskrit canon, besides his commentaries on Śāstric works. His Sanjivani commentary on Meghasandesa is the most popular one. He is also known as a poet, a fact which is rather unknown, though the names of his creative compositions are known to the scholars of Sanskrit literature.

=== Commentaries ===
The following is the list of his commentaries on the Classical Epics of Sanskrit:

1. Sañjīvinī - Commentary on Kālidāsa's Raghuvaṃśa, Kumārasambhava and Meghadūta
2. Ghaṇṭāpatha - Commentary on Bhāravi's Kirātārjunīya
3. Sarvāṅkaṣa - Commentary on Māgha's Śiśupālavadha
4. Jīvātu - Commentary on Śrīharṣa's Naiṣadhīyacarita
5. Sarvapathīnā - Commentary on Bhaṭṭikāvya

The following is the list of his commentaries on Śāstric works:

1. Tarala - commentary on Vidyādhara's Ekāvalī - alaṃkāra śāstra
2. Niṣkaṇṭakā - commentary on Varadarāja's Tārkikarakṣā ṭīkā

Sushil Kumar De notes that Mallinātha's commentary on Meghaduta was the most well known commentary.

=== Creative works ===
1. Raghuvīracaritā
2. Vaiśyavamśa Sudhākara
3. Udāra Kāvya

Interestingly, in the Marathi Language, there is a word 'Mallinathi', which means 'a long monologue' spoken by somebody. For example, if a Mr. X says a Mr. Y is doing a "Mallinathi", it means that Mr. Y has been speaking for far too long.

== Bibliography ==
1. Mallināthamanīṣā: a collection of papers presented at the Seminar on Mallinatha, edited by P. G. Lalye, Published 1981, Dept. of Sanskrit, Osmania University
2. Mallinātha by P. G. Lalye, Sahitya Akademi
3. Mallinātha's Ghaṇṭāpatha on the Kirātārjunīya I-VI: Part one: Introduction, Translation and Notes by Roodbergen JAF, Leiden: E. J. Brill, 1984
4. thehindu.com (subscription required)
