= Cherlagudam =

Village in Telangana, India

Coordinates: 17.520°N 78.089°E

Cherlagudam (from cherla, lake and gudam, hamlet) is a village in Medak district, Telangana state, India.
