= Rajakkapet =

Rajakkapet Sokkannapeta
- Village
- Country: India
- State: Telangana
- District: Medak

Languages
  - Official: Telugu
- Time zone: UTC+5:30 (IST)
- PIN: 502108
- Telephone code: 08457
- Vehicle registration: AP-23
- Nearest city: Siddipet
- Lok Sabha constituency: Medak
- Avg. summer temperature: 44 °C (111 °F)
- Avg. winter temperature: 25 °C (77 °F)

Rajakkapet is a village in Dubbak Mandal, Medak District, Telangana, India.
