= Rajpet =

Coordinates: 17°50′N 78°16′E

Rajpet is a village in Medak mandal of Medak district in the Indian state of Telangana.
