= Eddumailaram =

- Census Town
- Location in Telangana, India Eddumailaram (India)
- Coordinates: 17°30′25″N 78°17′00″E
- Country: India
- State: Telangana
- District: Medak

Area
  - Total: 6.20 km^{2} (2.39 sq mi)

Population (2011)
  - Total: 11,759
  - Density: 1,900/km^{2} (4,910/sq mi)

Languages
  - Official: Telugu
- Time zone: UTC+5:30 (IST)
- Postal code: 502205
- Vehicle registration: TG
- Website: telangana.gov.in

Eddumailaram is a census town in Sangareddy District of Telangana.

== Demographics ==
As of the 2001 India census, Eddumailaram had a population of 13,584. Males constitute 52% of the population and females, 48%. The town has an average literacy rate of 77%, higher than the national average of 59.5%: male literacy is 82%, and female literacy is 71%. In Eddumailaram, 13% of the population is under 6 years of age.
