= Burgupalli =

Burgupalli (or Burugupalle) is a village in the Havelighanpur mandal of the Medak revenue division of Medak district in the Indian state of Telangana. It has a total population of 6,546 people.
