= Lingampet =

- Village
- Location within Telangana Location within India
- Coordinates: 18°14′18″N 078°07′49″E
- Country: India
- State: Telangana
- District: Kamareddy
- Elevation: 470 m (1,540 ft)

Languages
- Time zone: UTC+5:30 (IST)
- PIN: 503124
- Vehicle registration: TG
- Website: telangana.gov.in

Lingampet is a panchayat village and Mandal in Kamareddy district in the state of Telangana in India Lingampet village was established by Raja Venkata Narasimha Reddy and Queen Lingayamma, after whom it is named. Fort walls, lakes and many wells were constructed during their reign for the protection and development of the village. Papannapeta Samasthanam was extended and developed during the reign of Raja Venkata Narasimha Reddy. Construction of Jaksani Naganna Bavi (stepwell) in Lingampet village was also carried out during his reign.

Rani Shankaramma was a legendary ruler of Pappannapet Samasthanam. Building a strong and large army, she protected the people in the Nizam’s territory and fought against the Maharashtrians who tortured and collected tax from them. The Nizam granted the title of Rai Bagan to Rani Shankaramma for safeguarding and protecting the people and kingdom. Rani Shankaramma can be likened to Rani Rudramadevi, yet another fearless and powerful queen of the Kakatiya dynasty. She also constructed many huge lakes and canals for agricultural development.

== Geography ==
Lingampet is located east of the south-flowing Allair River, a tributary of the Manjira River. Lingampet has an average elevation of 470 meters (1545 feet).

== Mandal villages ==
Lingampet Mandal has sixteen panchayat villages each managing one or more villages. The panchayat villages are:

- Banapur
- Bhavanipet
- Bonal
- Jaldipalli
- Karpole
- Lingampalle (Khurd)
- Lingampet
- Mengaram
- Mothe
- Mumbajipet
- Nallamadugu
- Permalla
- Polkampet
- Pothaipalli
- S. Sangareddy
- Shetpally

== Demographics ==
At the 2011 Census, Lingampet Mandal had 48,961 inhabitants, 23,847 males and 25,114 females, all of them rural. Naganna Bavi: Constructed during the Kakatiya Rule, this ancient stepwell dates back to the 18th century and is still a sturdy structure despite being neglected. According to historians, Naganna Bavi is 100 feet deep and was built by Lingamma Desai to meet the drinking water and irrigation needs of the area. While Naganna Bavi was named after Jaksani Naganna who supervised the construction of this stepwell, Lingampet village was named in honor of Lingamma Desai.
