= Narsingi =

Narsingi may refer to:

- Narsingi, Ranga Reddy, an urban town in the Hyderabad Metropolitan Area in Ranga Reddy district in the Indian state of Telangana.
- Narsingi, Medak, a town in Medak district in the Indian state of Telangana.
