= Muttaikota =

Muttaikota is a village in Medak mandal of Medak district in the Indian state of Telangana.
