= Thirumalapur =

- Village
- Country: India
- State: Telangana
- District: Medak

Population
  - Total: 1,500

Languages
  - Official: Telugu
- Time zone: UTC+5:30 (IST)
- Vehicle registration: TS
- Nearest city: Gajwel
- Lok Sabha constituency: Medak
- Website: telangana.gov.in

Thirumalapur is a small village in Doulthabad Mandal and Medak district, Telangana, India.

The main occupation in the village is agriculture with popular crops including paddy, corn, cotton, and sunflower.

Temple: Hanuman, Lord Shiva
