= Sajjapur =

Coordinates: 17.597°N 77.672°E

Sajjapur is a village in Kohir Mandal in Medak district, Telangana state, India.
