= Khatagutta =

Part of an Indian village

Khataguutta, where the regionally renowned Mahadeva Swamy temple is situated, is part of Khata village, Nangunoor mandal, Medak district, Telangana state, India.
