= Raikod =

Coordinates: 17°50′N 77°45′E

Raikod is a village in Medak district of the Indian state of Telangana.
