= Damarcheruvu =

Damarcheruvu is a village in Medak district, Telangana state, India. Damarcheruvu belongs to ramayampet mandal. It is homeland of many farmers. The village is really inspiring by inculcating hygiene practices and promoting toilets for every home.
