= Medak mandal =

Medak mandal మెదక్ మండలం
- Mandal
- Location in Telangana, India Medak mandal (India)
- Country: India
- State: Telangana
- District: Medak district
- Headquarters: MEDAK

Government
  - Body: Mandal Parishad

Languages
  - Official: Telugu, Urdu
- Time zone: UTC+5:30 (IST)

Medak mandal is one of the 46 mandals in Medak district of the Indian state of Telangana. It is under the administration of Medak revenue division and the headquarters are located at Medak. The mandal is bounded by Ramayampet, Shankarapet (R), Kulcharam, Papannapet mandals and a portion of it also borders Nizamabad district.

== Government and politics ==
Medak mandal is one of the four mandals under Medak assembly constituency, which in turn represents Medak lok sabha constituency of Telangana Legislative Assembly.

== Towns and villages ==
As of 2011 census, the mandal has 43 settlements. It includes 2 towns and 41 villages.

The settlements in the mandal are listed below:

1. Ananthasagar
2. Aurangabad
3. Ausulpalle (OG)
4. Balanagar
5. Bogada Bhoopathipur
6. Burugupalle
7. Byathole
8. Chityal
9. Fareedpur
10. Gangapur
11. Havelighanpur
12. Khazipalle
13. Komtoor
14. Kuchanpalle
15. Lingasanpalle
16. Magta Bhoopathipur
17. Maqdumpur
18. Medak (M)
19. Medak (R)
20. Mirgudpalle
21. Mudulwai
22. Muthaipalle
23. Nagapur
24. Pashapur
25. Pathur
26. Perur
27. Rajpalle
28. Rajpet
29. Rayalamadugu
30. Rayanpalle
31. Serikuchanpalle
32. Shalipet
33. Shamnapur
34. Suklapet
35. Thimmaipalle
36. Thogita
37. Venkatapur

Note: M-Municipality

== See also ==
- List of mandals in Telangana
