= Chegunta =

- Census Town
- Location ln Telangana, India Chegunta (India)
- Coordinates: 17.971337°N 78.4618°E
- Country: India
- State: Telangana
- District: Medak

Area
  - Total: 4.28 km^{2} (1.65 sq mi)
- Elevation: 547 m (1,795 ft)

Population (2011)
  - Total: 5,747 (Urban) 53,118 (Rural)
  - Density: 1,340/km^{2} (3,480/sq mi)

Languages
  - Official: Telugu
- Time zone: UTC+5:30 (IST)
- PIN: 502255
- Telephone code: 08452
- Vehicle registration: TG-35
- Literacy: 76.5%
- Lok Sabha constituency: Medak
- Vidhan Sabha constituency: Dubbaka

Chegunta is a census town in Medak district of Telangana, has population of 10,747 of which 5,872 are males while 4,875 are females as per report released by Census India 2011. The population of children aged 0-6 is 655, which is 11.40% of total population of Chegunta (CT). In Chegunta Census Town, the female sex ratio is 1001 against state average of 993. Moreover, child sex ratio in Chegunta is around 882 compared to Andhra Pradesh state average of 939. The literacy rate of Chegunta city is 75.00% higher than the state average of 67.02%. In Chegunta, male literacy is around 86.13% while female literacy rate is 64.06%. Chegunta Census Town has total administration over 1,244 houses to which it supplies basic amenities like water and sewerage. It is also authorized to build roads within Census Town limits and impose taxes on properties coming under its jurisdiction.

== Ethnic groups, language and religion ==
Religion in Chegunta (Urban) - (2011)
Hindus	86.64%
Muslims	12.01%
Christians	0.70%
Others	0.66%

== Transport ==
Chegunta is well connected with AH-43 freeway to Telangana capital city Hyderabad and major cities like Nizambad, Kamareddy, ans Medak. It also has railway station with Wadiaram (WDR) name, which has multiple trains.
