= Vakiti Sunitha Laxma Reddy =

Indian politician

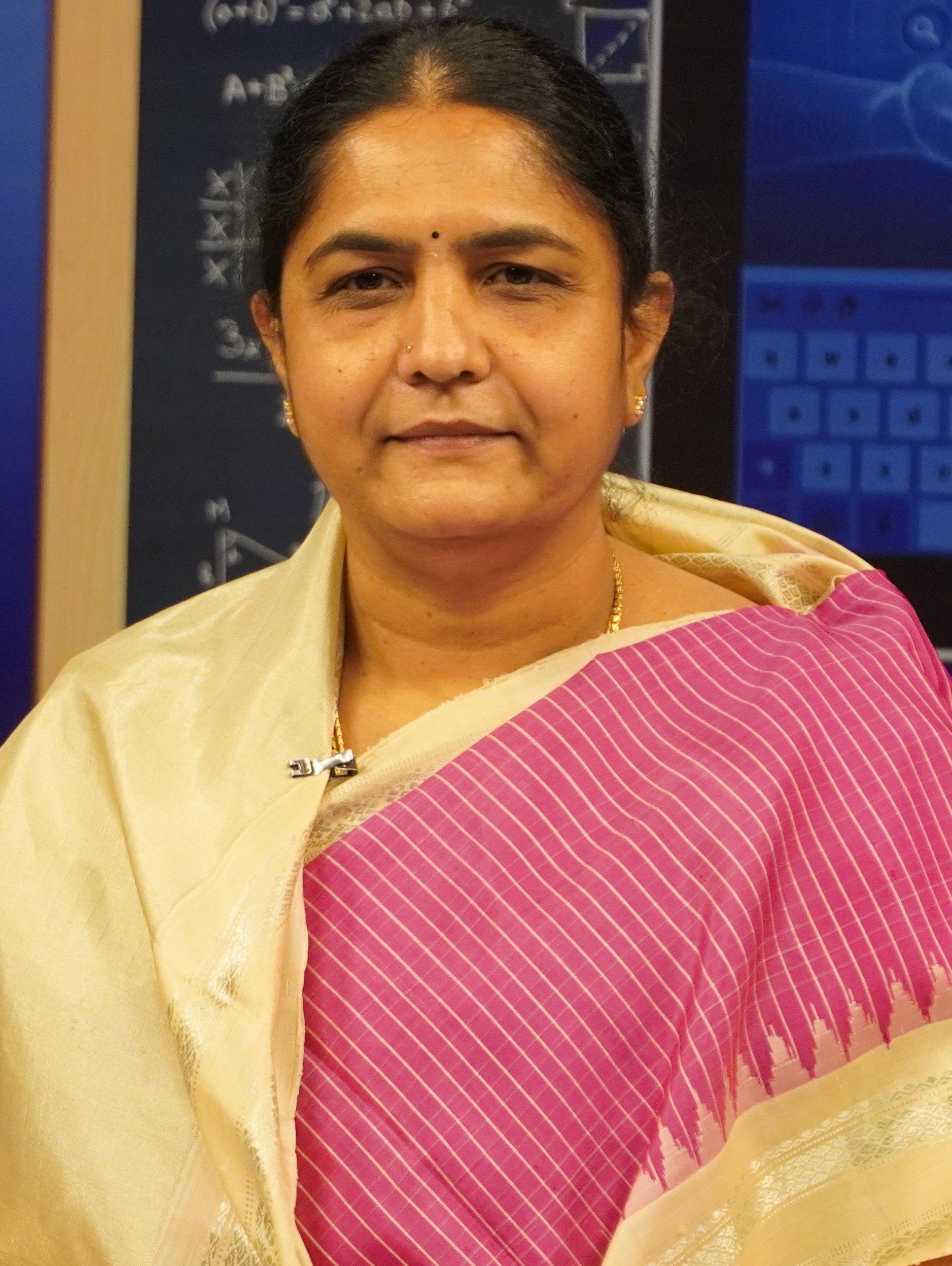

Member of Legislative Assembly, Telangana
- Incumbent
- Assumed office 2023
- Preceded by: Chilumula Madan Reddy
- Constituency: Narsapur

Minister for Women welfare, Child welfare, Disabled Welfare, SHGs, IKP, Pensions Government of Andhra Pradesh
- In office 25 November 2010 – 21 February 2014
- Governor: E. S. L. Narasimhan
- Chief Minister: Kiran Kumar Reddy
- Preceded by: Konda Surekha
- Succeeded by: President's Rule

Minister of Minor Irrigation Government of Andhra Pradesh
- In office 25 May 2009 – 24 November 2010
- Governor: N. D. Tiwari; E. S. L. Narasimhan
- Chief Minister: Y. S. Rajasekhara Reddy; Konijeti Rosaiah
- Preceded by: Ponnala Lakshmaiah

Member of Legislative Assembly Andhra Pradesh
- In office 1999 - 2014
- Preceded by: Chilimula Vithal Reddy
- Succeeded by: Telangana Assembly Created
- Constituency: Narsapur

Personal details
- Born: 5 April 1968 (age 58) Gomaram, Shivampet Mandal, Telangana, India
- Party: Bharat Rashtra Samithi (2019-present)
- Other political affiliations: Indian National Congress (1999-2019)
- Spouse: Late Sri Vakiti Laxma Reddy
- Children: Srinivas Reddy, Shashidhar Reddy

Vakiti Sunitha Laxma Reddy was elected as BRS Party MLA from Narsapur Assembly Constituency, Medak District of Telangana. She was elected for four terms from the same constituency. She served as Minister for Minor Irrigation in the cabinets led by Dr. Y.S. Raja Sekhar Reddy, K. Rosaiah, and Kiran Kumar Reddy. In the reshuffling and reformation of the cabinet by N. Kiran Kumar Reddy, Sunitha Laxma Reddy was allocated the portfolio of Indira Kranthi Yojana and Pensions. She contested 2014 by poll from Medak (Lok Sabha constituency) being Congress candidate and lost.

On 3 April 2019, she joined BRS Party at the public meeting in Medak parliamentary constituency.

Present: Telangana government appointed Vakiti Sunitha Lakshma Reddy as the chairperson and the members of women's commission on 27 December 2020.

Sunitha was also the former minister of women development and child welfare in Andhra Pradesh who has now taken the charge of being the Chairperson of the women's commission.

Bharat Rashtra Samithi president and Telangana chief minister K Chandrasekhar Rao on 25 October 2023 announced the candidature of Vakiti Sunitha Lakshma Reddy for Narsapur assembly constituency for 2023 Telangana Legislative Assembly election to be held on November 30.
