= Alladurg =

- Village
- Location in Telangana, India Alladurg (India)
- Coordinates: 17.9667°N 77.9167°E
- Country: India
- State: Telangana
- District: Medak
- Elevation: 511 m (1,677 ft)

Languages
  - Official: Telugu
- Time zone: UTC+5:30 (IST)
- PIN: 502269
- Telephone code: 08450
- Vehicle registration: TS-35
- Nearest city: Sangareddy
- Sex ratio: 1:.85 ♂/♀
- Lok Sabha constituency: Medak
- Vidhan Sabha constituency: Andole
- Climate: Normal (Köppen)
- Website: telangana.gov.in

Alladurg or Allahdurg is a village in Medak district, Telangana, India.

== Geography ==
Allahdurg is located at 17.9667°N 77.9167°E. It has an average elevation of 511 metres (1679 ft).
