= Golconda Patrika =

- Type: Weekly newspaper
- Format: Broadsheet
- Founded: 1926
- Ceased publication: 1967
- Headquarters: Hyderabad State, India

Golconda Patrika was an Indian Telugu-language journal. The founder and editor was Suravaram Pratap Reddy.

== History ==
The journal started 10 May 1926. It was a journal in Hyderabad State.

Many of Reddy's articles appeared in journals like Sujata, Shoba, and Bharati.

== Closure ==
The periodical's publication ended in 1967.
