= Chilumula Madan Reddy =

Indian politician

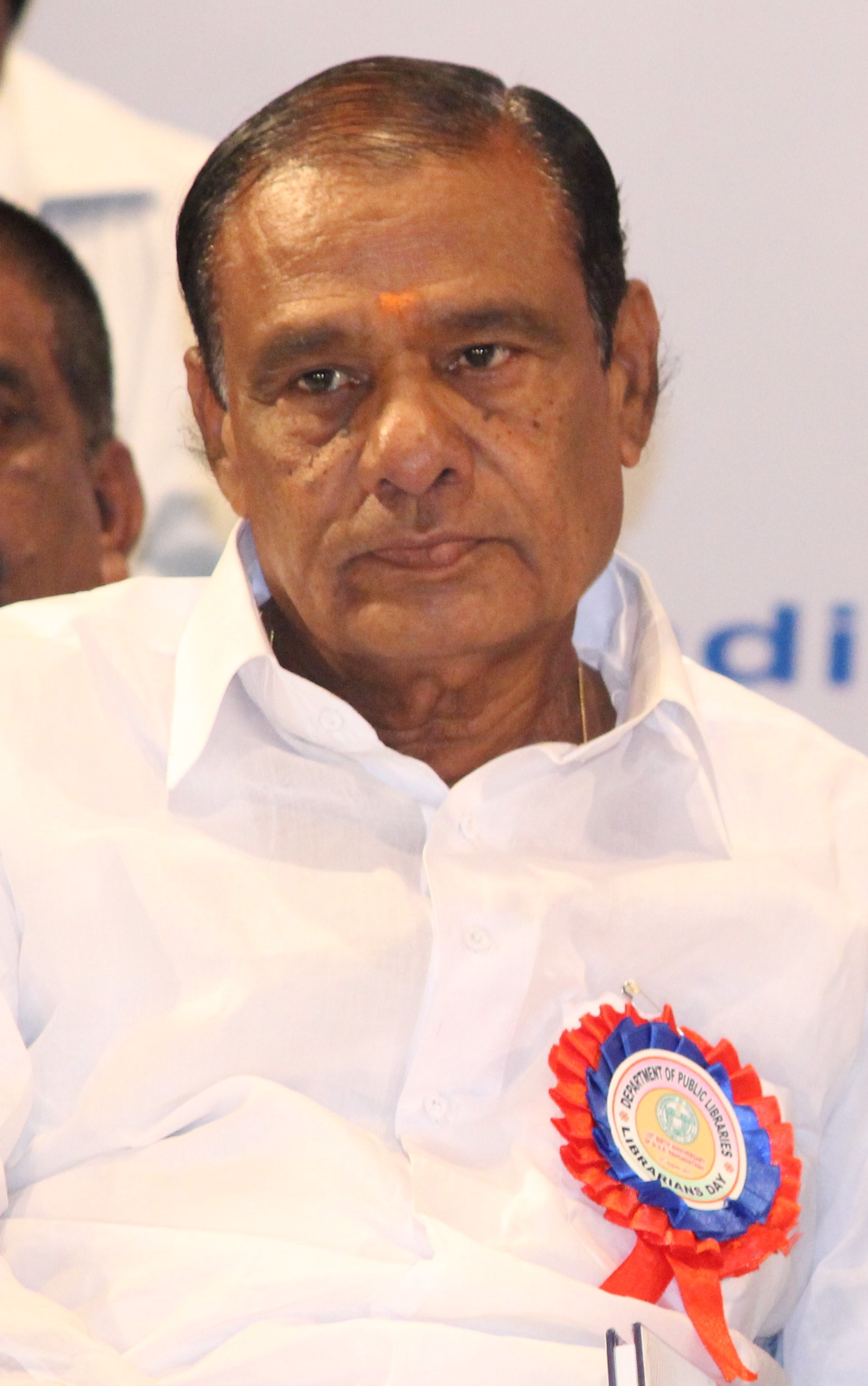
- Chilumula Madan Reddy

Member of Legislative Assembly, Telangana
- In office 2 June 2014 – 11 December 2023
- Preceded by: Telangana Assembly Created
- Succeeded by: Vakiti Sunitha Laxma Reddy
- Constituency: Narsapur

Personal details
- Born: 1 January 1951 Kaudipalli
- Party: Indian National Congress
- Other political affiliations: Bharat Rashtra Samithi; Telugu Desam Party
- Occupation: Politician

Chilumula Madan Reddy is a politician from the Indian state of Telangana. He belongs to the Indian National Congress and the former MLA of Narsapur Assembly constituency.

== Early life and education ==
Madan Reddy was born on 1 January 1951 to Manikya Reddy and Lalithamma in Kaudipalli village of Kaudipalli mandal, Medak district, Telangana state. He completed his B.Com graduation in 1971 from Badruka College under Osmania University.

== Personal life ==
Madan Reddy was married to Sujatha Reddy

== Political career ==
Madan Reddy, started his political career with the Telugu Desam Party contested from the Narsapur Assembly constituency in 2004 and lost against the Indian National Congress candidate Vakiti Sunitha Laxma Reddy by a margin of 25817 votes. After that he joined the Telangana Rashtra Samithi.

Later in 2014 Telangana elections, he contested again from the Narsapur constituency representing Telangana Rashtra Samiti and won against the Indian National Congress candidate Vakiti Sunitha Lakshmareddy with a majority of 14,217 votes.

In the 2018 Telangana elections, he again contested from the same party and same constituency and won against the same Indian National Congress candidate with a majority of 38,120 votes. He served twice as the Director of Andhra Pradesh State Irrigation Development Corporation and once as the Chairman of Medak District Library Corporation.
