= Sardhana, Medak district =

Village in Telangana, India

Coordinates: 29°09′N 77°37′E

Sardhana is a village in Medak district in state of Telangana, India.
