= Pocharam Wildlife Sanctuary =

- IUCN category IV (habitat/species management area)
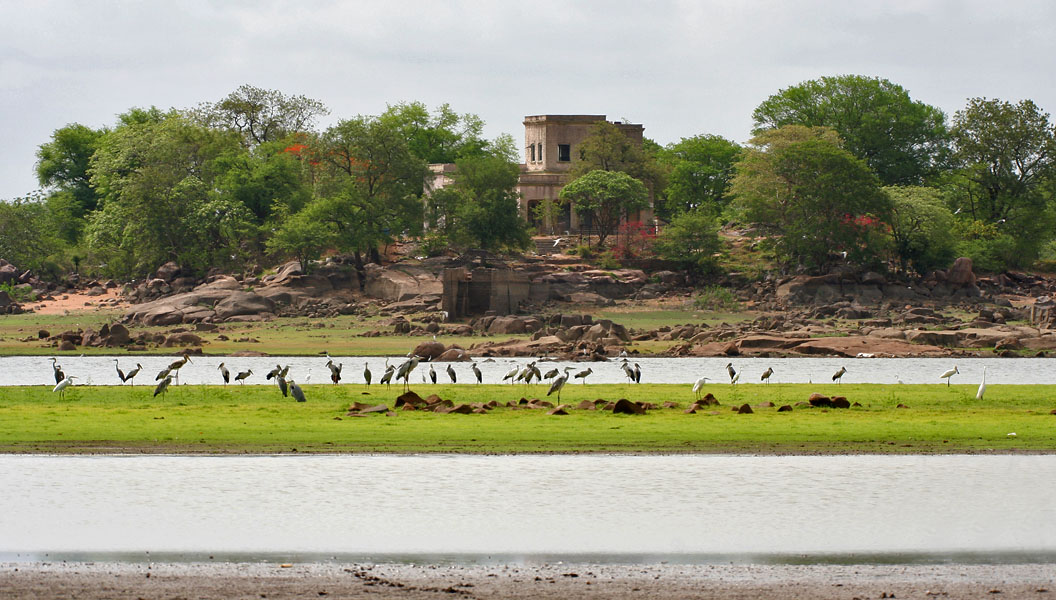
- A view from Pocharam Lake with herons, egrets and openbill storks

- Location within Telangana Location within India
- Interactive map of Pocharam Wildlife Sanctuary
- Location: Medak and Kamareddy districts, Telangana State, India
- Nearest city: Medak
- Coordinates: 18°07′30″N 78°12′00″E
- Area: 130 km^{2} (50 sq mi)
- Established: 1952
- Website: forest.ap.nic.in/WL%20POCHARAM.htm

Pocharam Wildlife Sanctuary is a forest and wildlife sanctuary located 15 km (9.3 mi) from Medak and 115 km (71 mi) from Hyderabad, Telangana, India. Spanning over 130 square kilometres (50 sq mi), in the districts of Kamareddy and Medak, it was a former hunting ground of the Nizam that was declared a wildlife sanctuary in the early 20th century. It is named after the Pocharam lake, formed from the bunding of the Allair from 1916-1922. The sanctuary has an ecotourism center for visitors. It is home to many species of birds and mammals. The sanctuary is situated 100 km from Nizamabad city.
