= Ramayampet =

- Ramayampet
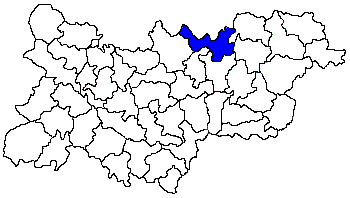
- Location of the Ramayampet Taluka and Municipality and mandal in the Medak district

- Location in Telangana, India Ramayampet (India)
- Coordinates: 18.116609°N 78.429766°E
- Country: India
- State: Telangana
- District: Medak

Population (2011)
  - Total: 16,899

Languages
  - Official: Telugu
- Time zone: UTC+5:30 (IST)
- Postal code: 502101
- Vehicle registration: TS 35
- Literacy: 70.93%
- Website: medak.telangana.gov.in

Ramayampet is a Municipality and a mandal in Medak District of Telangana State. Ramayampet was an Assembly Constituency in the former Andhra Pradesh State from 1952 to 2009 in Medak district in Indian state of Telangana. It is the 4th biggest town in Medak district and is 20 km form Medak and is 80 km (50 mi) from Hyderabad. Located on National Highway NH 44, The longest National Highway in India NH 44 in Ramayampet.

Tanguturi Anjaiah who was the 7th Chief Minister of United Andhra Pradesh from 11-October-1980 to 24- February-1982, for a period of 1 year 136 days, was elected as an MLA from Ramayampet Assembly Constituency in the 6th general Elections which were held in the year 1978.

== Geography ==
Ramayampet is located at 18.116609°N 78.429766°E. It has an average elevation of 475 m (1,558 ft). Ramayampet is centrally located between Hyderabad and Nizamabad also between Siddipet and Sangareddy. It has got both National highway, state highway and rail transport system is just 4 km away from the town.

== Demographics ==
As of 2011 India census, Ramayampet had a population of 16899. Males constitute 49.16% of the population and females 50.84%. Ramayampet has an average literacy rate of 70.93%, lower than the national average of 74.04%: male literacy is 81.79% and female literacy is 60.45%. Ramayampet became municipality in 2018 with 12 wards. Ramayampet has become a Revenue Division in 2023 due to efforts and Relay Hunger strike organised by JAC, Different community groups and All party people together.
