= Medak (surname) =

Medak is a surname.

Notable people with the surname include:

- Duje Medak (born 1993), Croatian footballer
- Judd Medak (born 1979), Canadian ice hockey player
- Marin Medak (born 1987), Slovenian adventurer
- Peter Medak (1937–2026), British film director

== See also ==
- Međak
- Medaković (disambiguation)
