= Bogada Bhupathipur =

Bogada Bhupathipur is a village in Medak mandal of Medak district in the Indian state of Telangana.
