= Chilipched =

Village in Telangana, India

- Revenue village
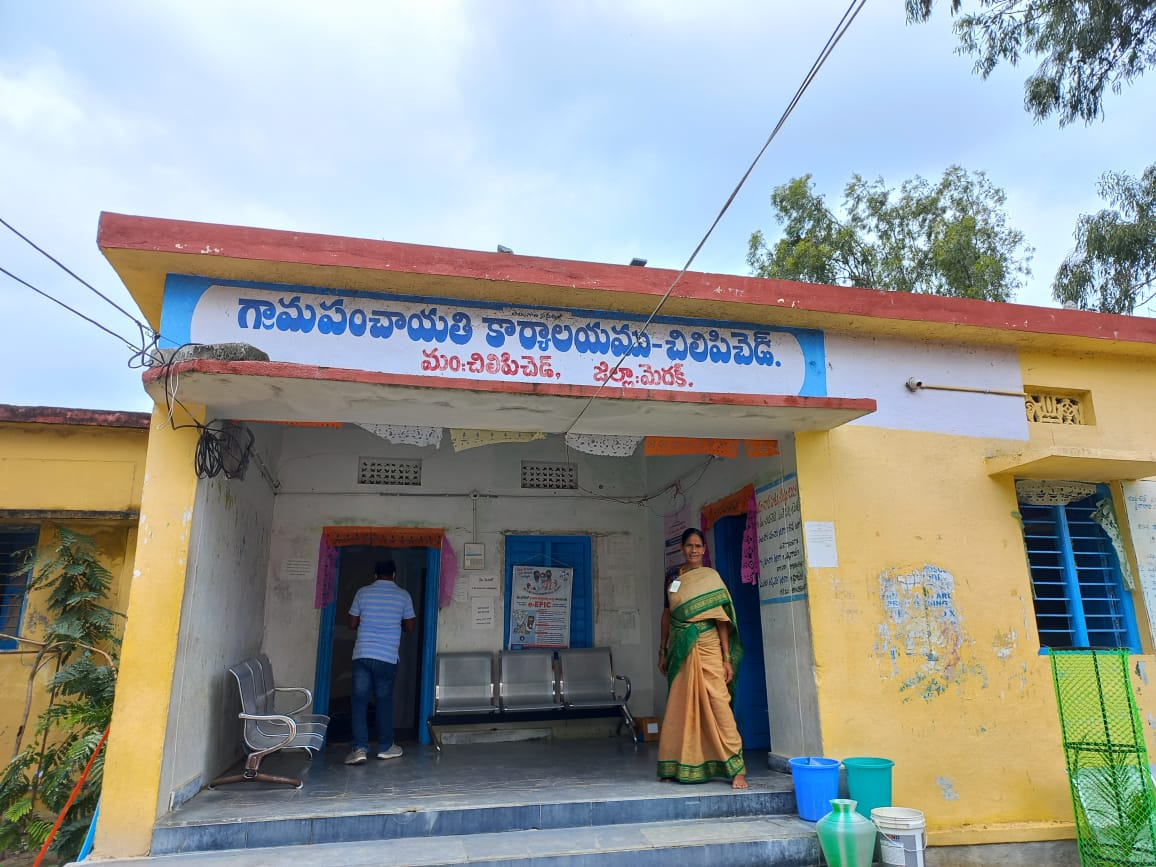
- Chilipched Gram Panchayat Office

- Location within Telangana Location within India
- Coordinates: 17°52′12″N 78°07′10″E
- Country: India
- State: Telangana
- District: Medak
- Mandal: Chilipched

Government
  - Type: Sarpanch

Area
  - Total: 8.14 km^{2} (3.14 sq mi)
- Elevation: 504 m (1,654 ft)

Population (2011)
  - Total: 2,305
  - Density: 283/km^{2} (733/sq mi)
- Postal Index Number: 502314

Chilipched is a village in Chilipched Mandal, Medak District, Telangana, India.

The village is 36 kilometers away from the nearest town of Medak. It used to be under the Kowdipalle Mandal of Medak District. Following the reorganization of districts in Telangana on 11 October 2016, it was included in the newly formed Chilipched Mandal.

== Geography ==
The village is situated in the northeastern section of Chilipched Mandal, covering an area of 814 hectare. There is a body of water to the immediate east of the village.

== Demographics ==
According to the 2011 Indian Census, the village has 522 households and a population of 2,305. There are 1,131 male residents and 1,174 female residents. The census location code of the village is 573541.
