= Kulcharam =

Kulcharam/kolcharam
- Village
- Location in Telangana, India
- Coordinates: 17.9553°N 78.1989°E
- Country: India
- State: Telangana
- District: Medak
- Elevation: 469 m (1,539 ft)

Languages
  - Official: Telugu
- Time zone: UTC+5:30 (IST)
- PIN: 502381
- Telephone code: 91-08452
- Vehicle registration: AP23
- Vidhan Sabha constituency: Narsapur

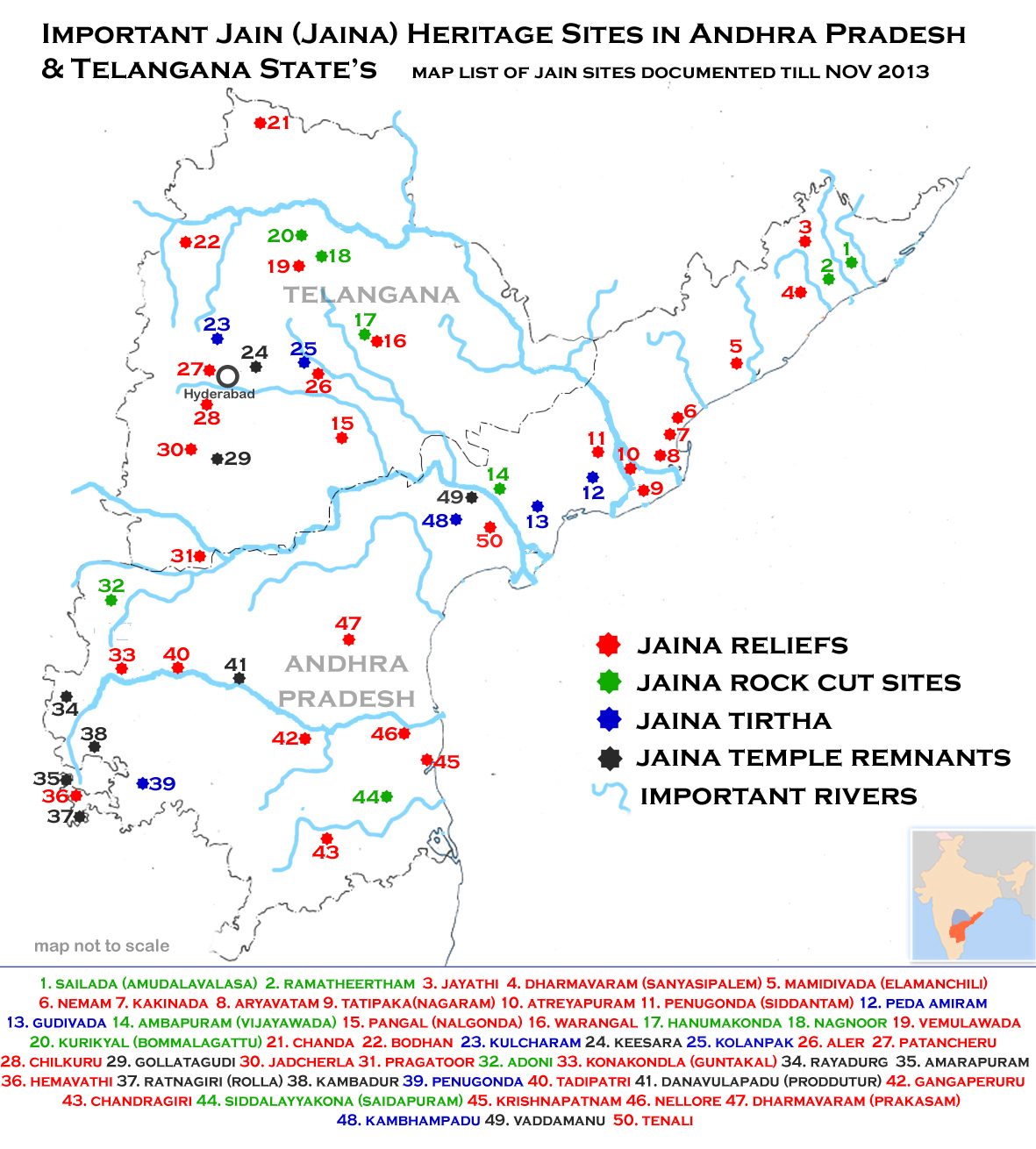
Kulcharam is an important Jain Tirtha in present-day Medak district of Andhra Pradesh state

Kulcharam is a village and mandal in Medak district of Telangana, India.

It is bounded by Tekmal, Papannapet, Medak, Yeldurthy, Kaudipalli and Andole mandals.

== Geography ==
Kolcharam or kulcharam is located at 17.9553°N 78.1989°E. It has an average elevation of 469 metres (1541 ft).

== Demographics ==
According to Indian census, 2001, the demographic details of Kolcharam or kulcharam mandal is as follows:

- Total Population: 33,822 in 6,755 Households.
- Male Population: 16,715 and Female Population: 17,107
- Children Under 6-years of age: 5,167 (Boys – 2,579 and Girls – 2,588)
- Total Literates: 12,887

Kolcharam or kulcharam village has a population of 4,522 in 2001.

== History ==
=== Shri Vighn-harneshvar Parshva Digambara Jain Atishaya Kshetra ===
Shri Vighn-harneshvar Parshva Digambara Jain Atishaya Kshetra or "place of a miracle" is a tirtha dedicated to the 23rd Tirthankara, Parshva. Shri Kshetra Kulcharam’s Parshva appeared and considered as Svayam vyakth place. The large idol of Parshva in standing posture was recovered during the construction work of government flats in year 1984. A magnificent temple with a dharmashala was constructed by the Jain Samaj, Hyderabad, Telangana. This idol has shown miraculous results and the darshana of Vighn-haraneshvar Parshva is believed to diminishes the worldly worries and fulfills the desired.

The main idol of Parshva is made of black stone of 11 feet and 3 inches in height, and in standing posture with seven serpent hoods overhead and belongs to 9th century. Water of consecration flows from all the hoods and then through head and shoulders it comes to feet. The scene of consecration by milk looks like the flow of pearls. The process of consecration is done according to Gomateshwara in Karnataka. The temple was constructed in year 2003.

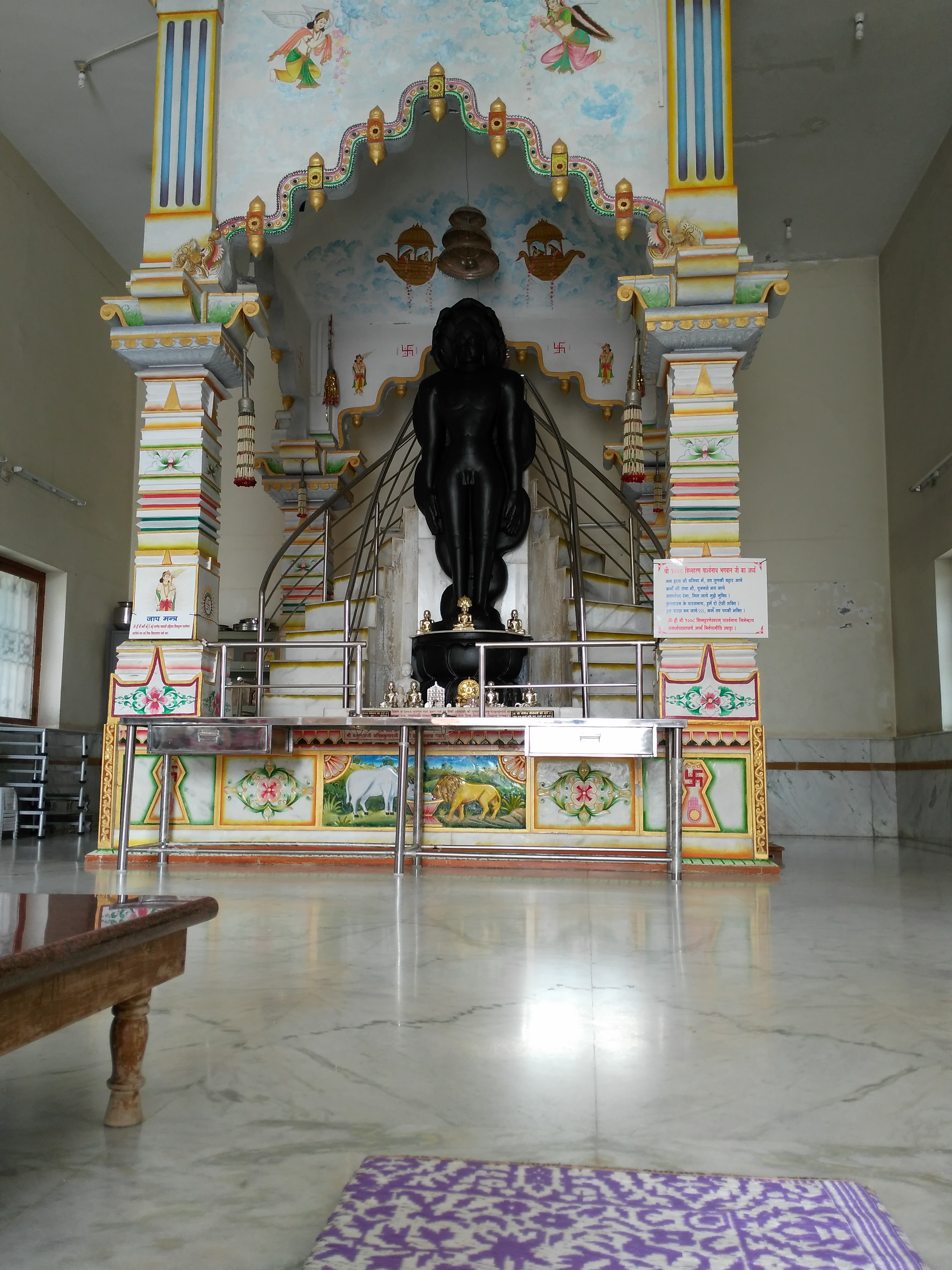
Shri 1008 Vighnharneshvar Parshwanath (Jain)

Kulcharam is the birthplace of an eminent critic, Mallinātha Sūri, who made a great contribution to Sanskrit.

== Banks ==
- Syndicate Bank has a branch at Kulcharam.

== Villages ==
The villages in Kolcharam or kulcharam mandal include: Amsanpalle, Chinna Ghanpur, Etigadda Mohmdapur, Kistapur, Konapur, Kongode, Kulcharam, Paithara, Pothamshettipalle, Pothireddipalle, Rampur, Rangampet, Sangaipet, Variguntham, Yenigandla, Appjipalle
