= Peddagattu jathara =

Festival in India

Peddagattu (పెద్దగట్టు జాతర) or Gollagattu Jathara (గొల్లగట్టు జాతర) is the festival done in the name of Lord Lingamanthulu Swamy and Goddess Choudamma every 2 years.

The presiding deities, Sri Lingamanthula Swamy, believed an Incarnation of Lord Shiva, and his sister – Choudamma, are offered various pujas during the five-day fete.

Peddagattu (Gollagattu) is the second biggest religious congregation or Jathara in the state of Telangana after Sammakka Saralamma Jatara in [mulugu district tadvai mandal medaram region .

Though primarily the Yadava community takes part in huge numbers, people from all castes and religions from across Telangana, Andhra Pradesh, Chhattisgarh, Madhya Pradesh, Maharastra, Odisha, Karnataka and Tamil Nadu come to the place located just 5-km. from Suryapet. The festival is protected by police and assisted by volunteers during 3-day period.

According to history, this religious congregation has been celebrated since 16th century. Even it is still been celebrated with the government funds.

The festival is protected by police and assisted by volunteers during 3-day period. It is located in Durajpally village [Suburb in Suryapet Municipality], Suryapet District, Telangana state.
