= Yeldurthy =

- Nickname: Veldurthy
- Country: India
- State: Telangana
- District: Medak

Languages
  - Official: Telugu
- Time zone: UTC+5:30 (IST)
- Postal code: 502255
- Telephone code: 084522
- Vehicle registration: TS 35
- Lok Sabha constituency: MEDAK
- Assembly constituency: Narsapur
- Website: medak.telangana.gov.in

Yeldurthy or Yeldurthi or Veldurthy is a Mandal in Medak district of Telangana, India. The village has Kakateeya Sculpture was having old temple Anantha Padmanabha. A Kakateeya Kala Toranam and Kakateeya Sila Shasanam are also appears in middle of the village. Main crops are Paddy and Sugar cane.
