= Vladimir Međak =

Serbian jurist (born 1976)

- Born: Владимир Међак; 21 July 1976 (age 50); Belgrade, Yugoslavia
- Other name: Vladimir Medjak

Academic background
- Education: University of Belgrade Faculty of Law (Graduate studies); The Faculty of Political Science and Diplomacy at the University of Bologna; Faculty of Political Sciences, University of Belgrade (PhD)
- Thesis: Harmonization of domestic legislation with the acquis communautaire in the field of competition (2013)

Academic work
- Institutions: European movement in Serbia
- Main interests: European Union law European integration

Vladimir Međak (Serbian: Владимир Међак; born 21 July 1976) is a Serbian Jurist and an expert in European law and European integration. He is currently the Vice President of the European Movement in Serbia and a former Assistant Director of the Office for European Integration of the Government of Serbia.

== Biography ==
He was born on 21 July 1976 in Belgrade, where he finished primary and secondary school. He enrolled at the Faculty of Law of the University of Belgrade in 1995, and graduated in 2000. In the period 2000–2001. He was a teaching assistant at the Belgrade Open School. He completed his master's degree at the Faculty of Political Science and Diplomacy at the University of Bologna in 2002 with the thesis "EU Regional Policy and Structural Funds". After military service 2002/2003. In 2004, he received a Chevening Scholarship for research in the field of European Union competition law at St. Peters College, University of Oxford, for the duration of three months.

He received his PhD from the Faculty of Political Science, University of Belgrade on 18 June 2013 on the topic "Harmonization of domestic legislation with the acquis communautaire in the field of competition" before a commission consisting of Vesna Knežević-Predić, professor at the Faculty of Political Science, University of Belgrade, Zoran Radivojević. Professor at the Faculty of Law, University of Niš, and Tanja Miščević, Professor at the Faculty of Political Science, University of Belgrade.

In September 2003, he started working in the field of the European integration of Serbia, first in the Sector for European Integration of the Ministry of Foreign Economic Relations of the Government of Serbia, and after the transformation of this sector in 2004 he started working in the Office for European Integration. drafting several laws, including the Law on Protection of Competition. From 2005 to 2008. He was the coordinator of the expert team for negotiations for the conclusion of the Stabilization and Association Agreement, and in 2010 he became the assistant director of the Office for European Integration.

In the period from 2009 to 2011, he was engaged as a teaching associate on the courses European Union Law and Institutional Law of the European Union. He was a member of the Negotiating Team for the Negotiations on the Accession of the Republic of Serbia to the European Union, in charge of legal issues, from August 2015 to May 2017. After resigning from the Office for European Integration in March 2016, he became an independent consultant for European integration and law, and from December 2017 he became vice president of the European Movement in Serbia.

== Selected bibliography ==
- Međak, Vladimir (2019). "Institucionalne promene u EU i nove procedure u procesu proširenja". Spoljnopolitičke sveske (1).
- Međak, Vladimir (2016). Does the Serbian Constitution Need to be Amended in the EU Accession Process. Belgrade: European Movement in Serbia.
- Delević, Milica; Međak, Vladimir (2011). "Srbija i Evropska unija‒jedanaest godina kasnije". Politički život (9).
- Budimir, Branko; Međak, Vladimir (2010). Pridruživanje Srbije Evropskoj uniji. Beograd: ISAC fond.
- HIks, Sajmon; Radić, Ivana; Mihajlović, Milena; Ateljević, Vladimir (2007). Politički sistem Evropske unije. Beograd: Službeni glasnik.
- Međak, Vladimir; Majstorović, Srđan (2005). Regionalan politika Evropske unije. Beograd: Kancelarija za pridruživanje Evropskoj uniji.
- Međak, Vladimir (2003). "Regional policy of the European Union". Međunarodni problemi. 55 (1): 25–56. doi:10.2298/MEDJP0301025M.
