= Pocharam Lake =

Lake in India

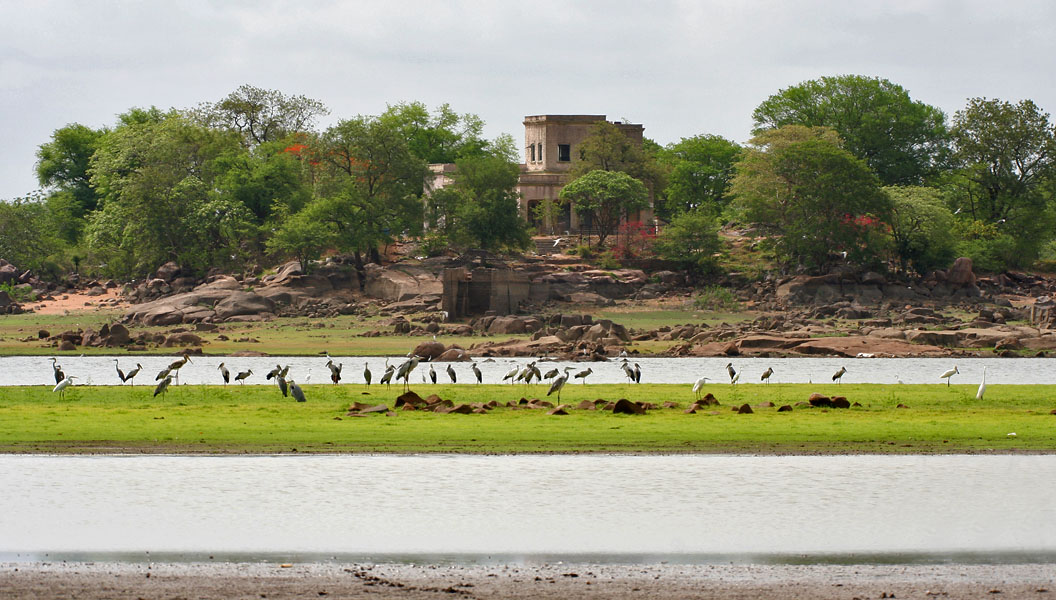
- A view from Pocharam Lake with Herons, Egrets, Openbills
- Location: Nizamabad district, Telangana, India
- Coordinates

Pocharam Lake is located in Medak district in the Indian state of Telangana. It is adjacent to Pocharam Forest & Wildlife Sanctuary.
