= Ryalamadugu =

Ryalamadugu is a village in Narayanakhed mandal of Sangareddy district in the Indian state of Telangana.
