= Narsingi, Medak district =

Narsingi
- Mandal
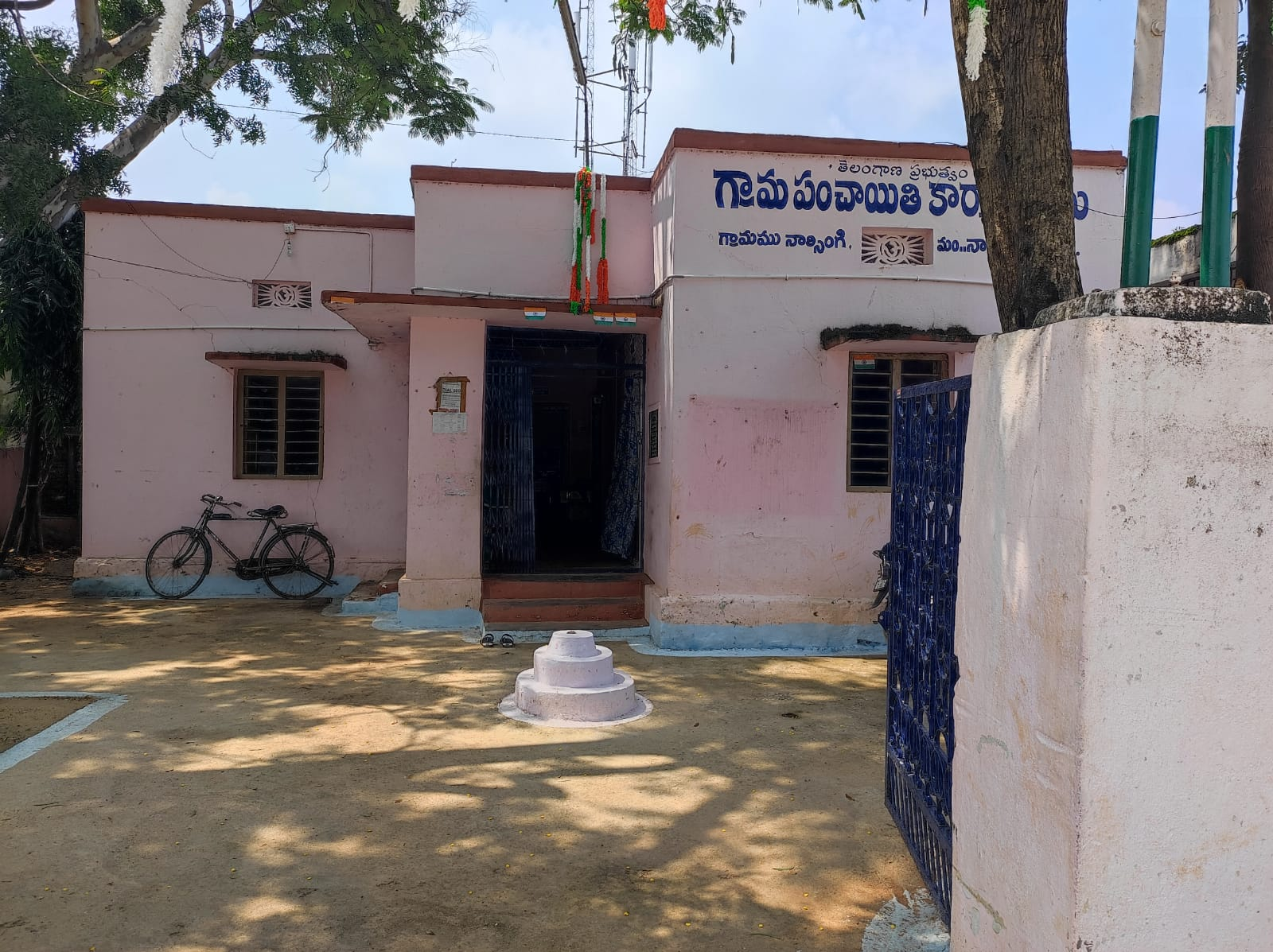
- Narsangi (Medak) Gram Panchayat Office

- Location in Telangana, India Narsingi (India)
- Coordinates: 18.03°N 78.43°E
- Country: India
- State: Telangana
- District: Medak
- Mandal: Narsingi
- Elevation: 529 m (1,736 ft)

Languages
  - Official: Telugu
- Time zone: UTC+5:30 (IST)
- PIN: 502248
- Vehicle registration: TG-35
- Website: telangana.gov.in

Narsingi is a Mandal in Medak district in the Indian state of Telangana.

== Geography ==
Narsingi is located at 18.03°N 78.43°E. It has an average elevation of 529 metres (1735 feet).
