= Kuchanpally =

Village in Medak district, Telangana

Kuchanpally is a village in Haveli ghanapur mandal of Medak district, Telangana State, India.

The village has a population of 1,984 people living in 473 households, as per the Census 2011.

MLC Sheri Subhash Reddy is from Kuchanpally.

== See also ==
- Villages in medak mandal
