= Medak Fort =

Coordinates: 18°2′37″N 78°15′18″E

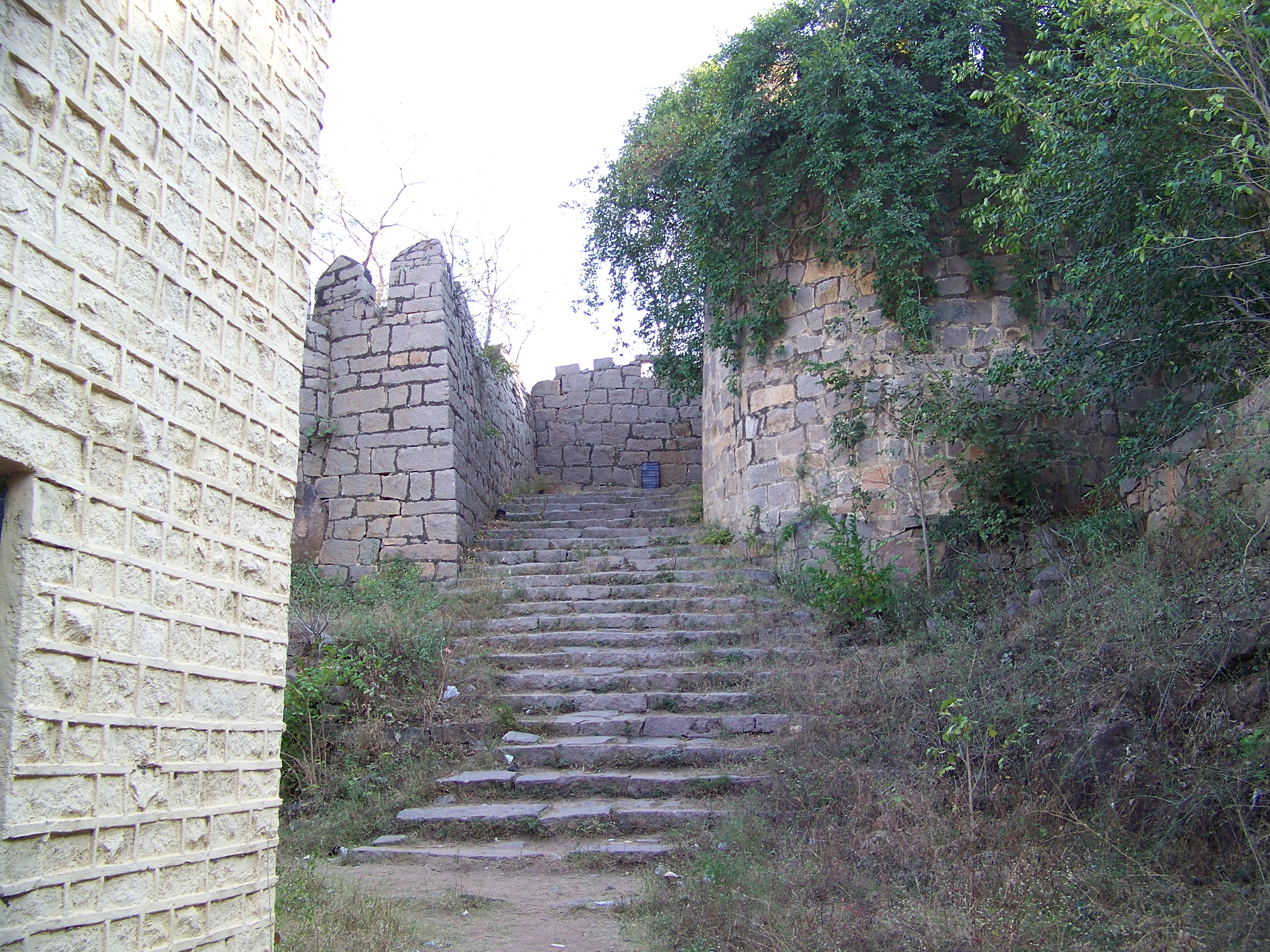
- Interactive map of Medak Fort
- Location: Medak, Telangana, India pin code 502110

Medak Fort is situated in Medak district in the Indian state of Telangana, about 100 kilometres from the state capital, Hyderabad. Medak fort was constructed by the Kakatiya Kings. The fort lies to the north of the city and can be reached by road. It is a citadel built on a hillock that provided as a vantage point for the Kakatiya rulers in medieval India.

The fort was built sometime around the 12th century and during the reign of the Kakatiya ruler, Rudra Deva and was called Methuku durgam, meaning cooked rice in Telugu. It was later ruled by another South Indian kingdom kings the Musunuri Kings. It was a command post of the Kakatians and later for Musunuri Kings and Qutb Shahis. It has three main entrances, the "Prathama Dwaram", the "Simha Dwaram" and the "Gaja Dwaram".

== History ==
Medak Fort, originally known as Methuku Durgam, was founded in the 12th century by the Kakatiya ruler Prataparudra on a prominent granite hillock to oversee trade routes and local administration. After the decline of the Kakatiyas, the fort passed to the Musunuri Nayakas in the 14th century and was later captured and enhanced by the Qutb Shahi dynasty in the 17th century, who added granaries and a mosque within its precincts. Under the Nizams, portions of the ramparts and bastions were reinforced, but after independence the structure fell into partial ruin before being declared a protected monument by the Archaeological Survey of India in 1953. Within the fort is a 17th-century Mosque built by the Qutub Shahis, granaries and remains of grand houses.

== Architecture ==
The fort spans over 100 acres atop a rocky hill rising to 90 m above the surrounding plains, accessed by a 500‑step stone stairway carved into the hillside. Its three principal gateways Prathama Dwaram, Simha Dwaram (adorned with lion motifs), and Gaja Dwaram (with elephant sculptures) exemplify a synthesis of Kakatiya craftsmanship and Qutb Shahi iconography, while a carved Gandabherunda (double‑headed eagle) motif crowns the main entrance lintel. Inside the ramparts lie a 3.2 m Dutch‑made cannon, vaulted granaries, soldiers’ barracks, and rock‑cut bastions that exploit the hill’s natural escarpments for defense, providing commanding views over the surrounding countryside. At the fort one can see a 17th-century cannon that is 3.2 metres long. The cannon has a trident etched on it. This fortress uses the natural topography to the maximum advantage with the rocky face offering it natural defences. The water to the fort was provided via a pipeline.
