= Rani Shankaramma =

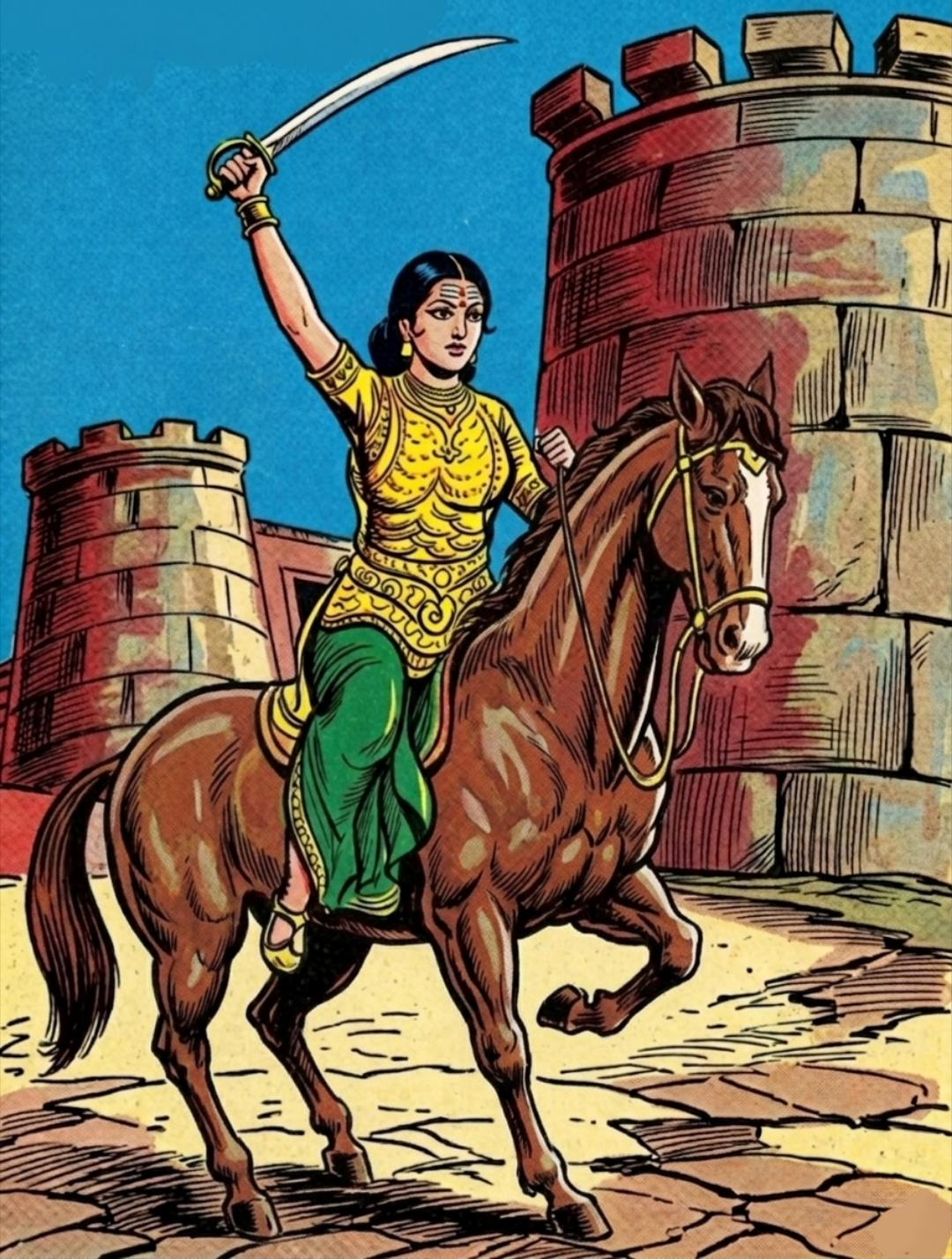
Rani Shankarmma

Rani Shankaramma was the Maharani who ruled the Andole Rajyam (Papannapet Samsthanam). She was a valiant queen of Telangana.

== Early life ==
She was born in 1702 in Gaudicherla, near Sangareddy, to the couple Sangareddy (after whom Sangareddy place is named) and Rajamma (after whom Rajampeta is named). Once Shankaramma reached a marriageable age, her parents married her to Narasimha Reddy, the King who ruled the Andole principality. While serving loyally within the Andole principality, the Siddiqui brothers conspired to betray the King and seize control of the kingdom. In the course of this plot, they one day administered poison to King Narasimha Reddy, bringing about his demise. Nevertheless, drawing upon her innate leadership qualities, Queen Shankaramma governed the Andole principality with great prosperity following her husband's death. The Nizam ruler at the time commanded Queen Shankaramma to wage war against the Maratha Peshwas. Torn between the anguish of her husband Narasimha Reddy's recent death on one hand, and the inescapable obligations of a vassal state on the other, she drew her sword for battle. Queen Shankaramma defeated the Maratha Peshwas. In recognition of her victory, the Nizam ruler honored her with the title "Raya Bhagini.

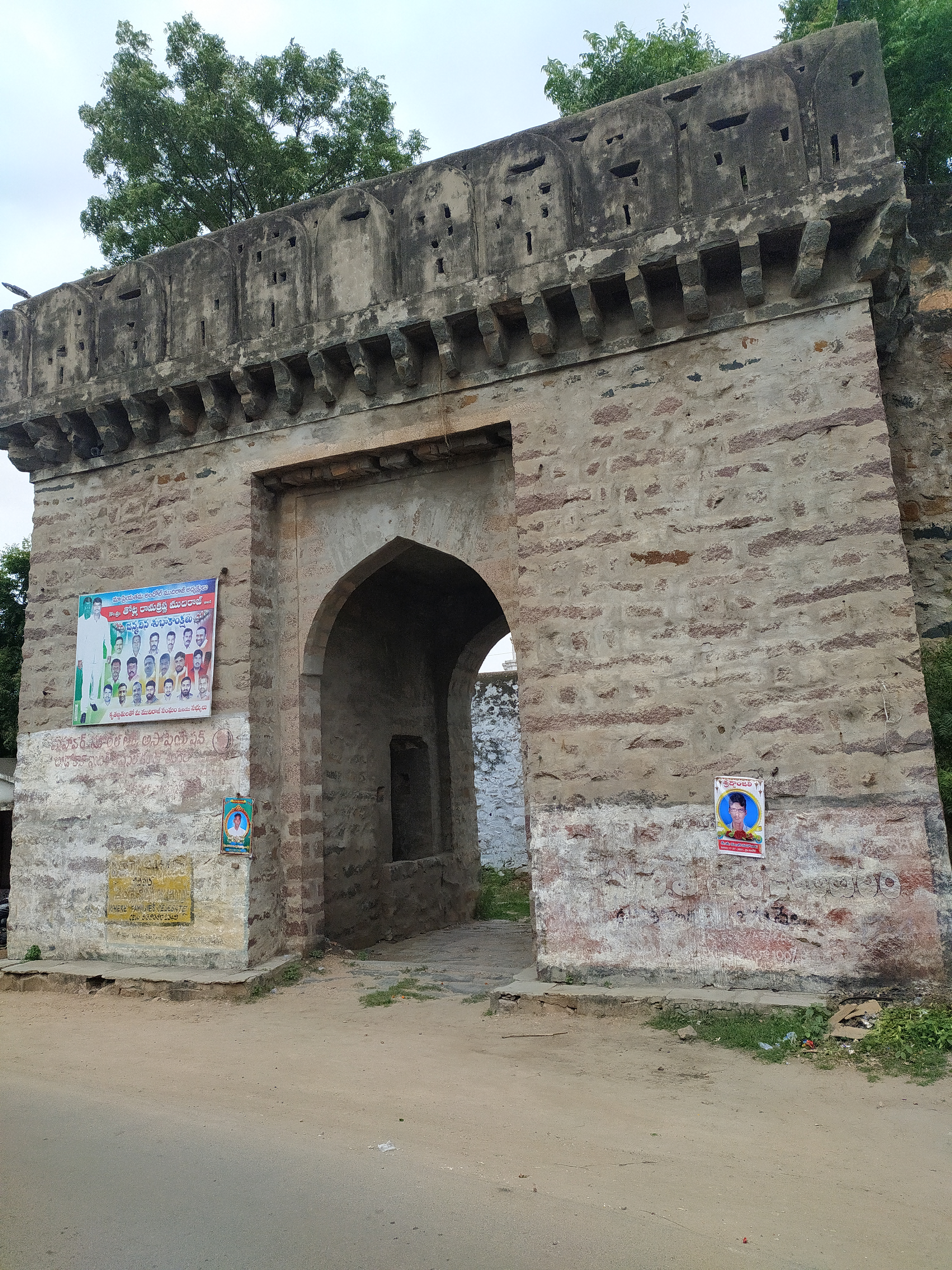
Andhole Gadi (Fort) main entrance

== Later life ==
Queen Shankaramma, who cared for her people as if they were her own children, expanded her kingdom by establishing several villages: Shankarampet (named after herself), Sangareddy (named after her father), Rajampet (named after her mother), and Papannapet (named after her commander, Mirelli Papanna). As she advanced in age, she entrusted the administrative responsibilities to her adopted son, Sadashivareddy. During that era, Mir Alam, the minister representing the Andole estate, wielded considerable influence within the court of the Nizam, Ali Khan. In 1774, while Shankaramma was returning from a visit to the Nizam, where she had gone to lodge a complaint regarding the unrest Mir Alam was fomenting within her estate, Mir Alam dispatched his soldiers to attack her, inflicting severe injuries upon her. Already advanced in years, Shankaramma was deeply distressed by this incident and passed away shortly thereafter.
