= Kowdipalle =

Kowdipally కౌడిపల్లె
- Census Town
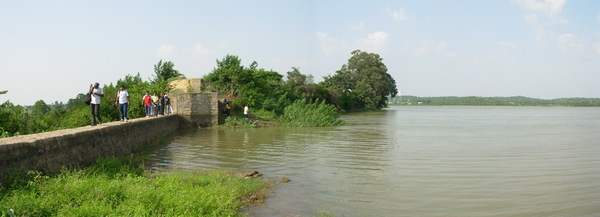
- Narsapur Lake

- Location in Telangana, India Kowdipally (India)
- Coordinates: 17°53′46″N 78°12′36″E
- Country: India
- State: Telangana
- District: Medak

Languages
  - Official: Telugu
- Time zone: UTC+5:30 (IST)
- PIN: 502313
- Telephone code: 08458
- Vehicle registration: TS 15
- Lok Sabha constituency: Medak

Kowdipally is a small town Mandal (an administrative division) in the Medak district of the Indian state of Telangana. It is represents the headquarters of the Kowdipally Mandal.

The Mandal is located 38 km North of the Sangareddy district headquarters. It is surrounded by the Kulcharam Mandal and the Medak Mandal to the North, the Andole Mandal to the West and the Yeldurthy Mandal to the East. Medak, Sangareddy, Sadasivpet and Kamareddy are larger towns located near Kowdipally.

== Demographics ==
Telugu is the local language. The total population of Kowdipally is 3773, comprising 1879 males and 1894 females living in 726 houses. The total area of Kowdipally is 200 hectares.

== Transport ==
Secunderabad Junction is the nearest railway station (67 km away from Kowdipally). Medak is the nearest town connected to Kowdipally by road.
