= Suravaram Pratapa Reddy =

Indian social historian (1896–1953)

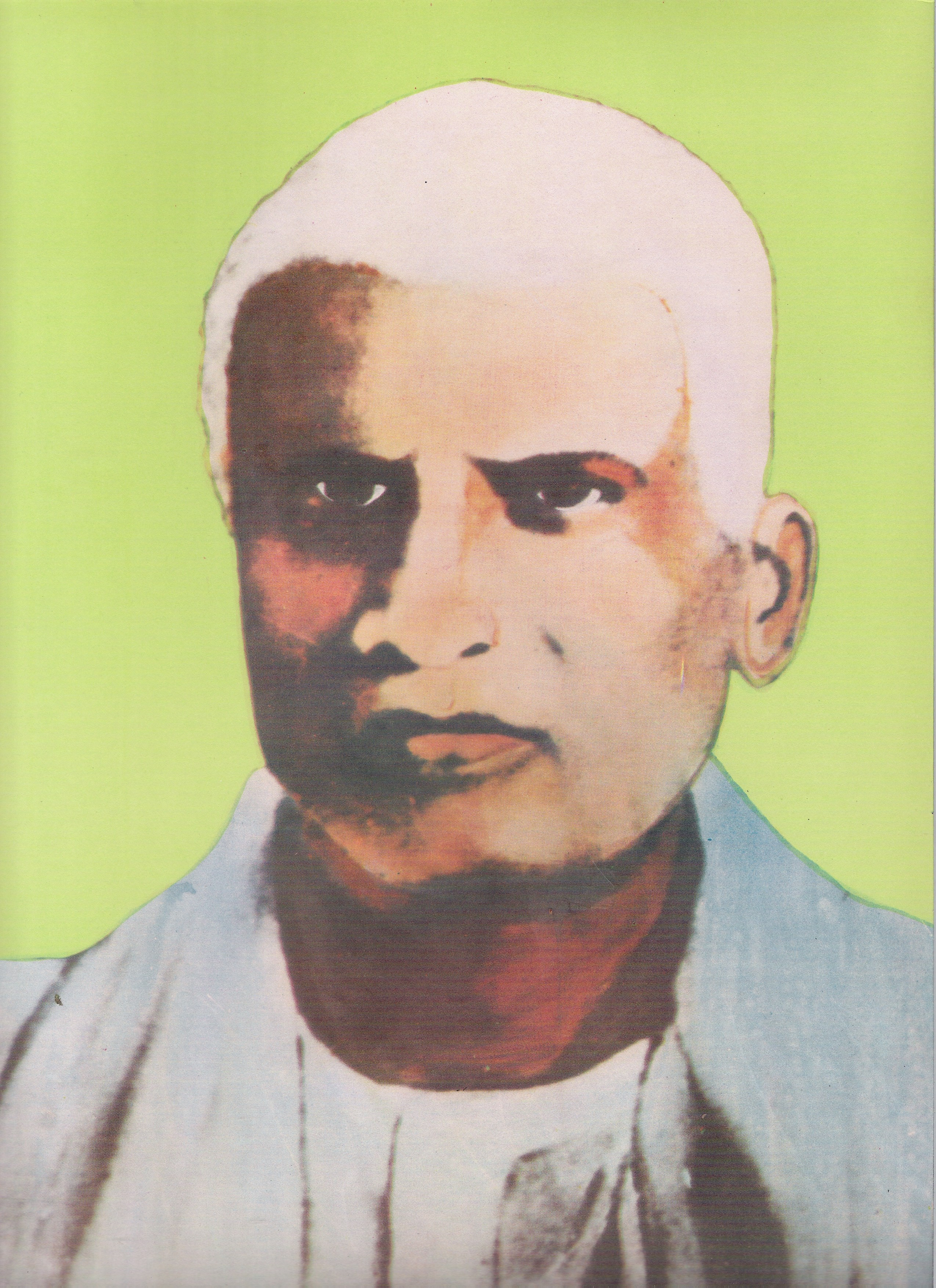
Suravaram Pratapa Reddy

Suravaram Pratapa Reddy (1896–1953) was a social historian, Freedom Fighter and poet from the Jogulamba Gadwal district (now in Telangana, India). He is popularly known as "Telangana Vythalikudu" (Torch Bearer).

== Life ==
Pratapa Reddy was born on 28 May 1896 in Boraveli village in the Gadwal district of the erstwhile Hyderabad State during the British Raj.

== Bibliography ==
- Golconda Kavula Charitra
- Raamayana Visheeshaalu
- Hinduvula Pandagalu
- Hindava Dharma Viirulu
- Dathu Srinivas Patel
- Manchireddy Chenna Reddy
- Andhrula Sanghika Charithra
