= Medak =

Town in Telangana, India

Medak Siddapuram Methukudurgam
- Town
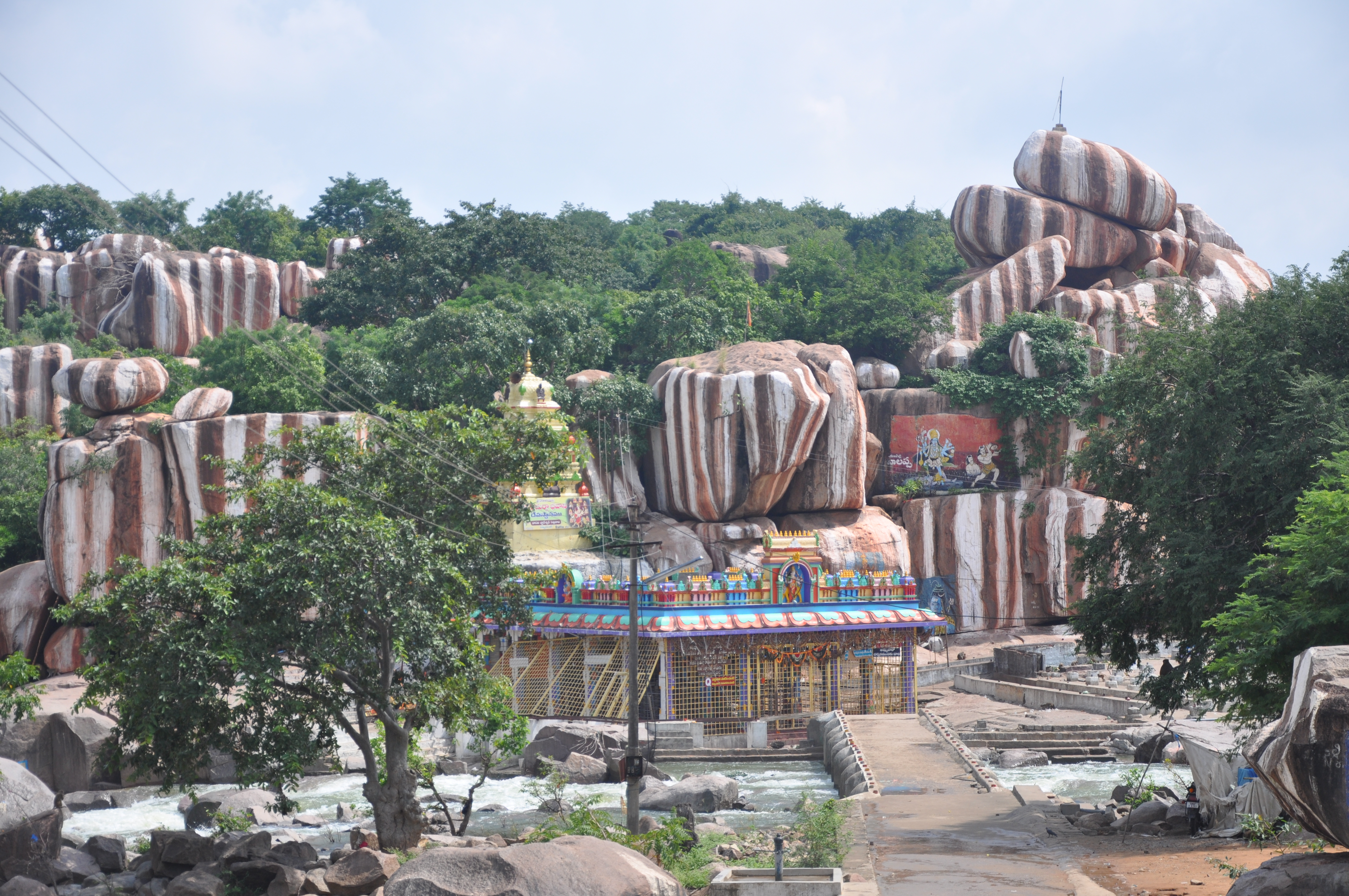
- The Edupayala Temple in Medak

- Location in Telangana, India Medak (India)
- Coordinates: 18.046°N 78.263°E
- Country: India
- State: Telangana
- District: Medak district

Government
  - Type: Municipality
  - Body: Council of Medak
  - SP: Sri B. Bala Swamy, IPS

Area
  - Total: 22 km^{2} (8.5 sq mi)
- Elevation: 442 m (1,450 ft)

Population (2011)
  - Total: 44,255
  - Density: 2,000/km^{2} (5,200/sq mi)
- Demonym: Medakakar

Languages
  - Official: Telugu, Urdu
- Time zone: UTC+5:30 (IST)
- PIN: 502110
- Telephone code: 08452
- ISO 3166 code: IN-TG
- Vehicle registration: TG-35/AP-23(Old)
- Website: Medak municipality

Medak, formerly known as Siddapuram, is a town in Medak district of the Indian state of Telangana. It is a municipality and the headquarters of Medak mandal in Medak revenue division.

== Etymology and History ==
Medak was originally named Methukudurgam (మెతుకుదుర్గం) (translated to grain in Telugu) due to the growth of rice here.

== Geography ==
Medak is located at 18.03°N 78.27°E. It has an average elevation of 442 meters (1450 feet).

=== Climate ===
Climate data for Medak (1991–2020, extremes 1979–2020)
| Month | Jan | Feb | Mar | Apr | May | Jun | Jul | Aug | Sep | Oct | Nov | Dec | Year |
|---|---|---|---|---|---|---|---|---|---|---|---|---|---|
| Record high °C (°F) | 36.0 (96.8) | 39.7 (103.5) | 41.9 (107.4) | 44.5 (112.1) | 46.3 (115.3) | 44.6 (112.3) | 37.4 (99.3) | 35.6 (96.1) | 36.0 (96.8) | 37.3 (99.1) | 36.6 (97.9) | 36.0 (96.8) | 46.3 (115.3) |
| Mean daily maximum °C (°F) | 30.7 (87.3) | 33.4 (92.1) | 36.9 (98.4) | 39.8 (103.6) | 41.3 (106.3) | 35.4 (95.7) | 31.0 (87.8) | 29.7 (85.5) | 30.7 (87.3) | 31.5 (88.7) | 30.8 (87.4) | 30.1 (86.2) | 33.5 (92.3) |
| Mean daily minimum °C (°F) | 14.3 (57.7) | 16.8 (62.2) | 20.3 (68.5) | 23.5 (74.3) | 25.7 (78.3) | 24.5 (76.1) | 23.0 (73.4) | 22.6 (72.7) | 22.4 (72.3) | 20.4 (68.7) | 16.4 (61.5) | 13.4 (56.1) | 20.3 (68.5) |
| Record low °C (°F) | 2.7 (36.9) | 8.0 (46.4) | 11.2 (52.2) | 16.5 (61.7) | 19.4 (66.9) | 13.9 (57.0) | 18.1 (64.6) | 17.0 (62.6) | 16.5 (61.7) | 10.8 (51.4) | 7.5 (45.5) | 5.0 (41.0) | 2.7 (36.9) |
| Average rainfall mm (inches) | 15.4 (0.61) | 8.4 (0.33) | 17.3 (0.68) | 16.4 (0.65) | 29.3 (1.15) | 129.2 (5.09) | 238.1 (9.37) | 261.6 (10.30) | 169.0 (6.65) | 102.7 (4.04) | 13.8 (0.54) | 5.0 (0.20) | 1,006.1 (39.61) |
| Average rainy days | 0.6 | 0.5 | 0.8 | 1.4 | 2.0 | 8.1 | 12.8 | 13.1 | 8.3 | 5.0 | 1.0 | 0.4 | 54.1 |
| Average relative humidity (%) (at 17:30 IST) | 45 | 36 | 31 | 30 | 29 | 52 | 68 | 75 | 73 | 66 | 57 | 47 | 51 |
Source: India Meteorological Department

== Demographics ==
As of 2011 census of India, the town had a population of 44,255 with 9011 households. The total population constitute, 21,336 males and 22,919 females —a sex ratio of 1074 females per 1000 males. 4,815 children are in the age group of 0–6 years, of which 2,418 are boys and 2,397 are girls —a ratio of 991 per 1000. The average literacy rate stands at 78.56% with 30,984 literates, significantly higher than the state average of 66.46%.

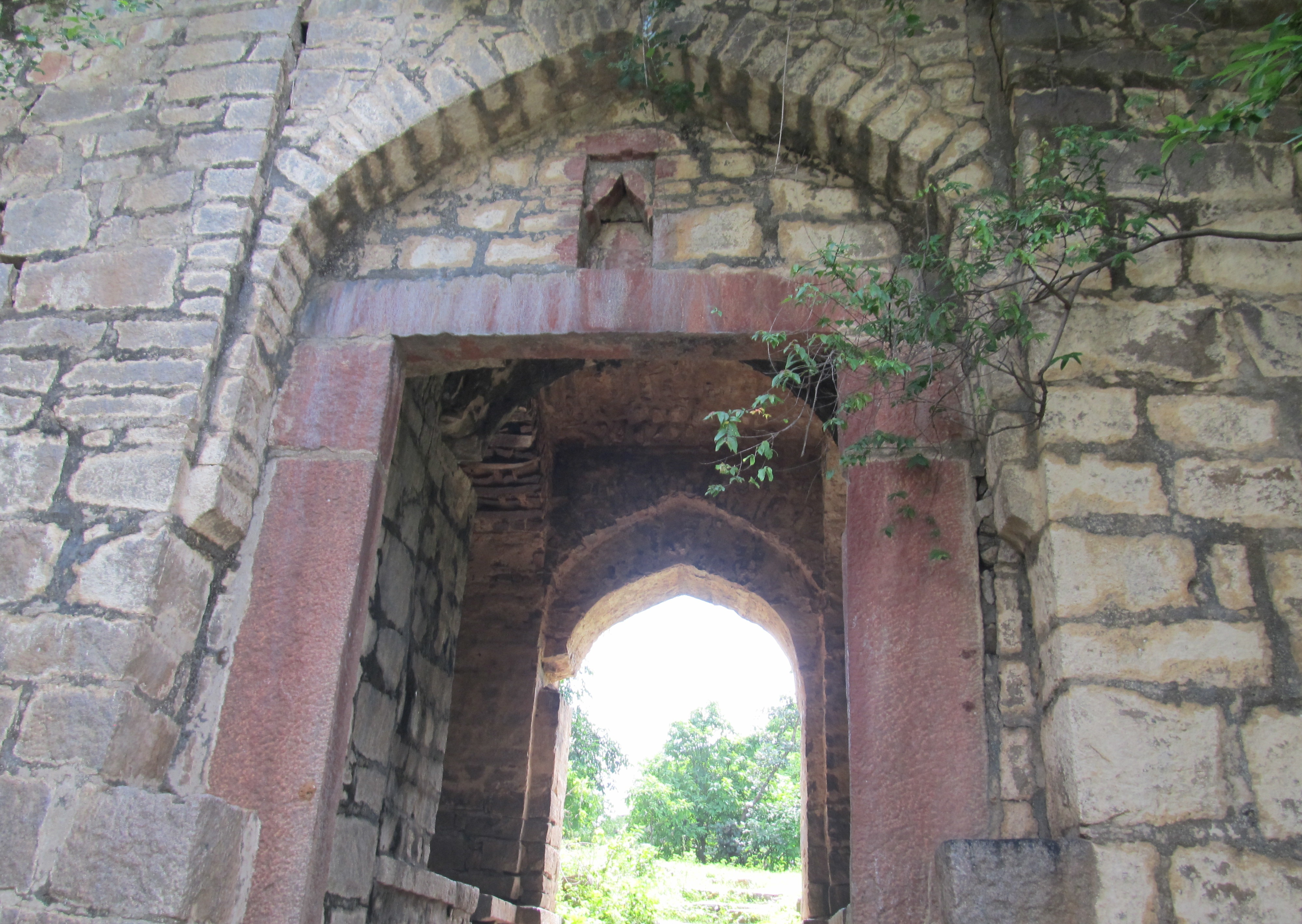
Medak Fort

== Governance ==
Medak municipality was formed in the year 1953. It is spread over an area of 22.00 km^{2} (8.49 sq mi). Medak urban agglomeration consists of Medak municipality and the out growth of Ausulapalle village.

== Economy ==
The largest employer in Medak is agriculture. After agriculture most people are employed in the unorganised sector.

== Tourism ==
Pocharam Wildlife Sanctuary is a forest and wildlife sanctuary named for the nearby Pocharam Lake. Medak Cathedral sees over the Diocese of Medak, the single largest diocese in Asia. Medak Fort is a popular tourist attraction. The fort was originally constructed by the Kakatiya kings and later developed by the Qutb Shahi kings. Ancient temple of Kuchadri Venkateshwara Swamy at Kuchanpally is a nearby Hindu worship centre.

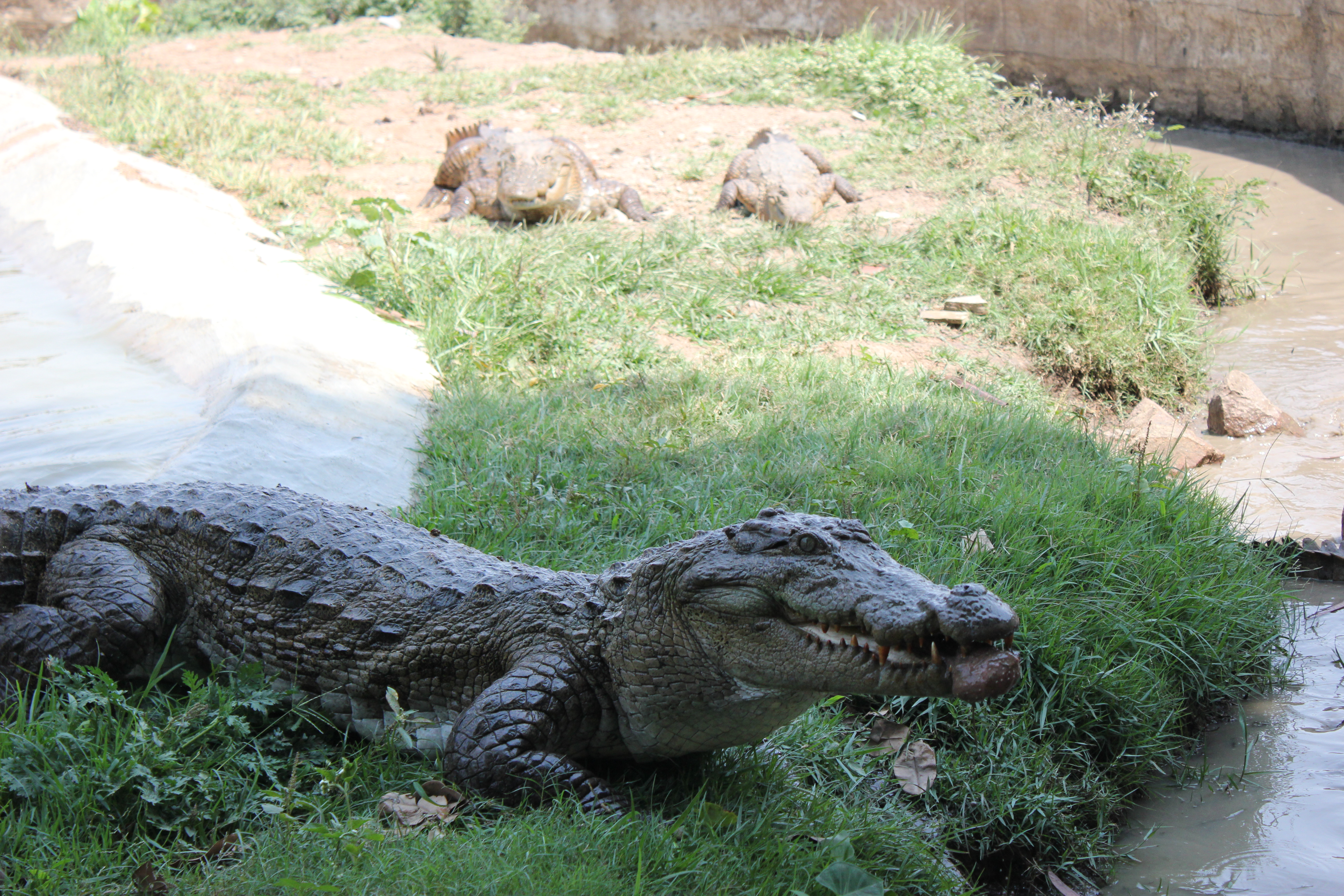
Manjeera Sanctuary

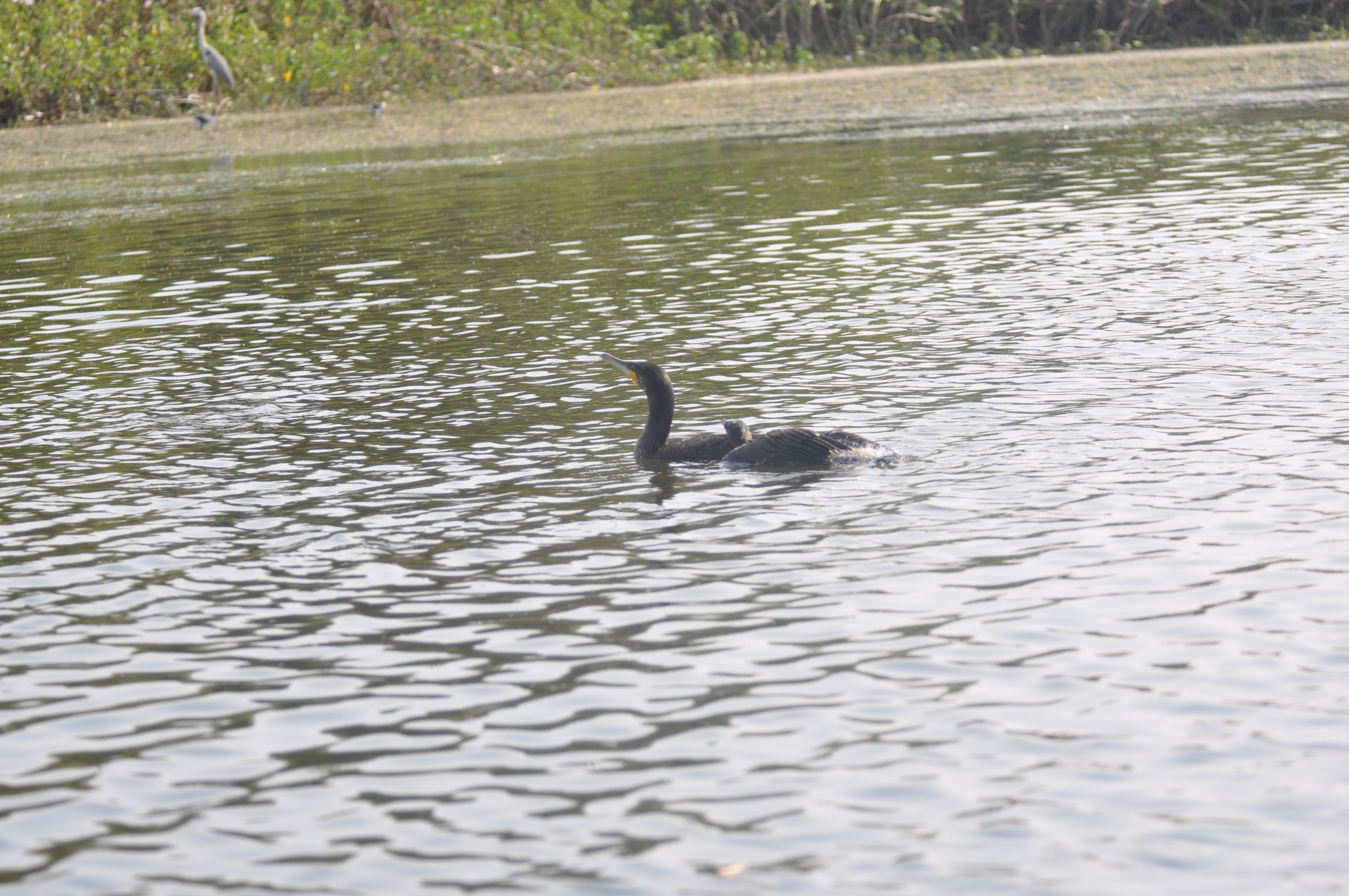
Manjeera River
