= Medak district =

Medak District
- District of Telangana
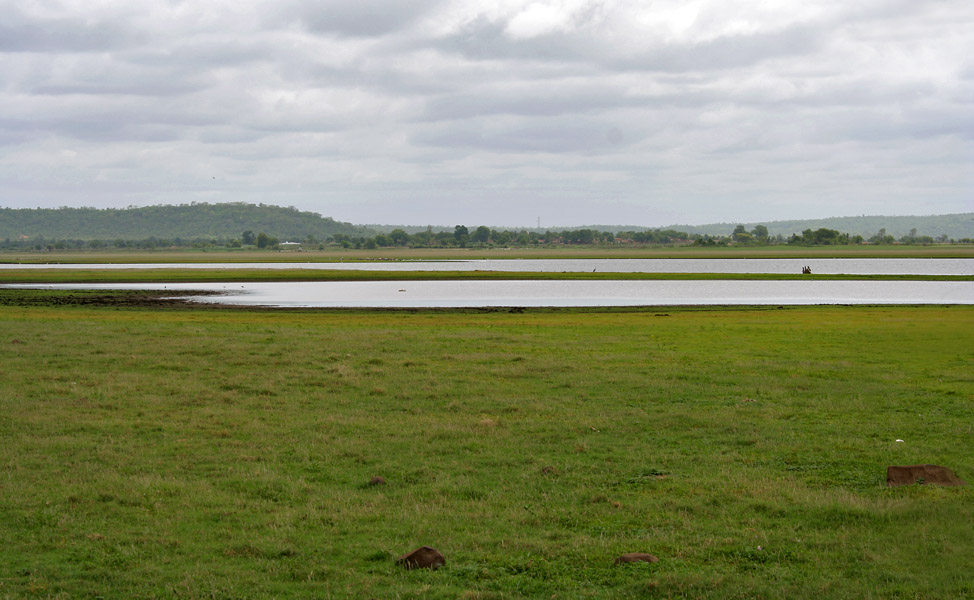
- Pocharam lake
- Interactive map of Medak District
- Country: India
- State: Telangana
- Headquarters: Medak
- Mandals: 21

Government
  - District collector: Sri Rahul Raj P.S.,IAS
  - Member of Parliament: Raghunandan Rao, BJP

Area
  - Total: 2,786 km^{2} (1,076 sq mi)

Population (2011)
  - Total: 767,428
  - Density: 275.5/km^{2} (713.4/sq mi)
- Time zone: UTC+05:30 (IST)
- Vehicle registration: TG 35
- Website: medak.telangana.gov.in

Medak district is located in the western region of the Indian state of Telangana. Medak is the district headquarters. The district shares boundaries with Sangareddy, Kamareddy, Siddipet and Medchal-Malkajgiri districts.

== History ==
Traces of Neolithic and Megalithic culture were found at Edithanur and Wargal village hillocks in the district. Rock paintings were found at Edithanur and Hastallapur rocks.

=== Papannapeta Samasthanam/Andole Rajyam ===
From the times of late Kakatiyas Papannapeta Samasthanam has been ruling this area, whose rulers have developed and contributed to this region. Papannapeta Samasthanam has ruled entire undivided Medak district at their peak, constructing numerous temples, tanks, wells and other developments across the district, rulers like Maharani Shankaramma and Raja Sadashiva Reddy of this Samasthanam are remembered till this day, their Veeragadas(Heroic deeds) and Ballads are sung in this region for 2-3 nights as a ritual & the samadi(Grave) of Maharani Shankaramma is treated as temple i.e.; Gudi(Temple).

=== Nizam state ===
In the 20th century Medak district was a part of Nizam princely State before independence and merged into Hyderabad State in Independent India. Qutub Shahis named it as Gulshanabad which means '"city of gardens'" due to its greenery.

=== Telangana ===
On October 11, 2016, the erstwhile Medak District was officially trifurcated into three smaller districts— Medak, Sangareddy, and Siddipet —by the Government of Telangana via GO Ms. No. 238. This reorganization resulted in the historic town of Medak becoming the headquarters for a newly formed, downsized district comprising just 20 mandals. Post-2016, the local economy centers heavily around agriculture—focusing on paddy and mango belts—and includes prominent cultural landmarks like the Medak Cathedral.

== Geography ==
The district is spread over an area of 2,757.3 square kilometres (1,064.6 sq mi).

== Economy ==
In 2006 the Indian government named Medak one of the country's 250 most backward districts (out of a total of 640). It is one of the thirteen districts in Andhra Pradesh currently receiving funds from the Backward Regions Grant Fund Programme (BRGF).

With the emergence of the Kothapalli-Manoharabad line railway line and inauguration of the Manoharabad - Siddipet portion of the line on 3 October 2023 with a regular Secunderabad junction-Siddipet DEMU train service, large parts of Medak district were connected on the railway map. Also announced during this time was the full railway electrification of the rail line that Manoharabad railway station is situated on.

== Demographics ==
Religion in Medak district (2011)
| Hinduism | 92.05% |
| Islam | 6.76% |
| Christianity | 0.77% |
| Other or not stated | 0.42% |

At the time of the 2011 census, Medak district has a population of 767,428. Medak district has a sex ratio of 1027 females per 1000 males and a literacy rate of 56.12%. 93,874 (12.23%) were under 6 years of age. 58,854 (7.67%) lived in urban areas. Scheduled Castes and Scheduled Tribes made up 127,970 (16.68%) and 72,900 (9.50%) of the population respectively.

Languages of Medak district (2011)
1. Telugu (83.9%)
2. Lambadi (8.42%)
3. Urdu (6.44%)
4. Others (1.23%)

At the time of the 2011 census, 83.91% of the population spoke Telugu, 8.42% Lambadi, 6.44% Urdu as their first language.

== Administrative divisions ==
The district is divided into three revenue divisions of Medak, Narsapur and Tupran. These are sub-divided into 21 revenue mandals (15 Mandal Praja Parishads) and has 381 villages constituting 320 gram panchayats. Sri Rajarshi Shah, I.A.S. is the present collector of the district.

=== Mandals ===
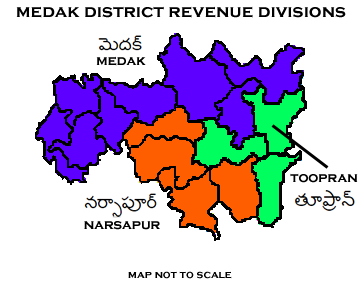
Medak District Revenue divisions

The below table categorizes 21 mandals into their respective revenue divisions in the district:

| S.No. | Medak revenue division | S.No. | Narsapur revenue division | S.No. | Toopran revenue division |
|---|---|---|---|---|---|
| 1 | Medak | 11 | Narsapur | 16 | Toopran |
| 2 | Havelighanpur | 12 | Kulcharam | 17 | Chegunta |
| 3 | Papannapet | 13 | Kowdipally | 18 | Narsingi |
| 4 | Sankarampet-R | 14 | Shivampet | 19 | Yeldurthy |
| 5 | Nizampet | 15 | Chilipched | 20 | Manoharabad |
| 6 | Ramayampet | | | 21 | Masaipet |
| 7 | Shankarampet-A | | | | |
| 8 | Tekmal | | | | |
| 9 | Alladurg | | | | |
| 10 | Regode | | | | |
