= Atmakur revenue division, Nandyal district =

Atmakur revenue division
- revenue division in Nandyal district
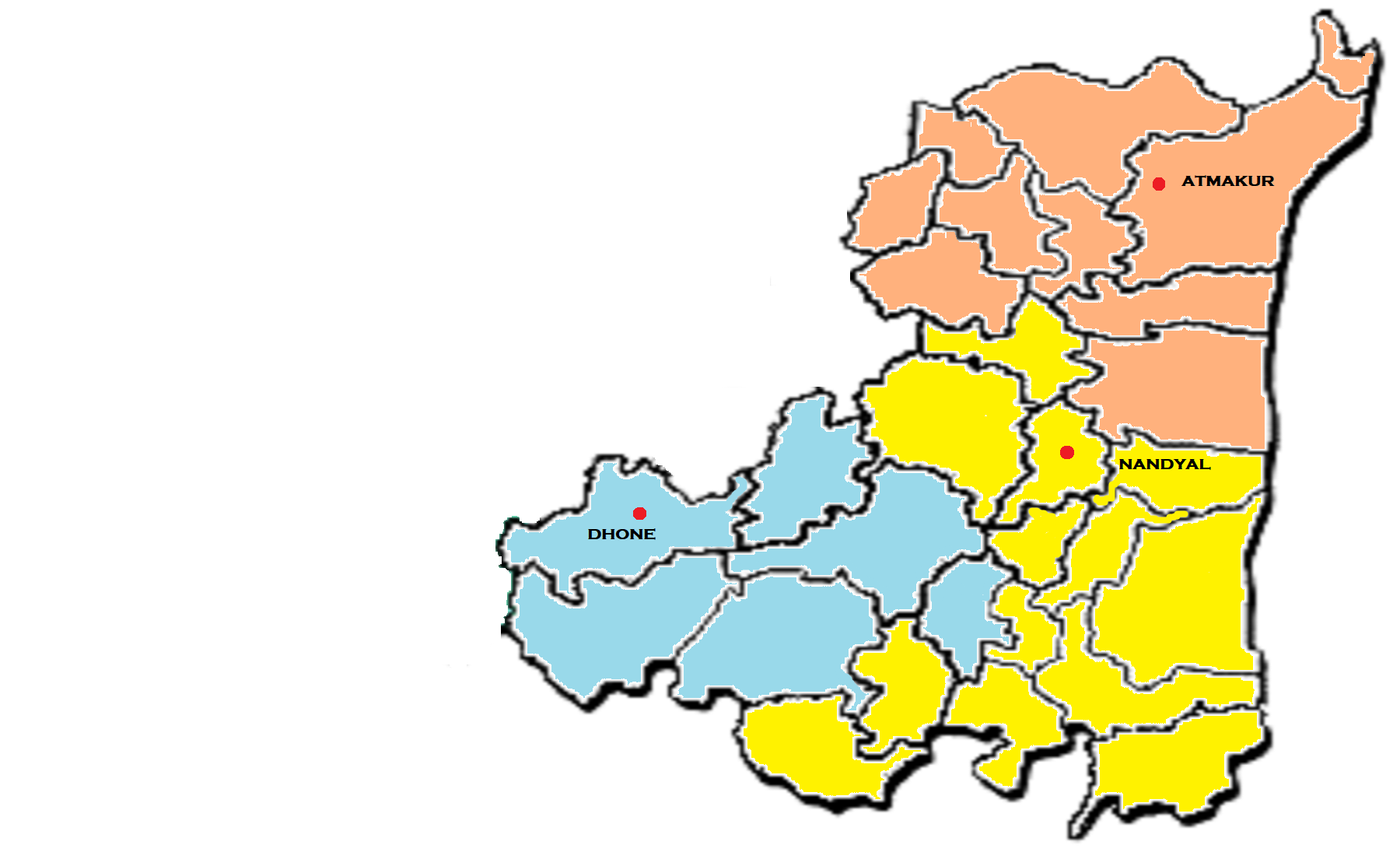
- Atmakur revenue division in Nandyal district
- Country: India
- State: Andhra Pradesh
- District: Nandyal
- Formed: 4 April 2022
- Founder: Government of Andhra Pradesh
- Time zone: UTC+05:30 (IST)

Atmakur revenue division is an administrative division in Nandyal district in the Indian state of Andhra Pradesh. It is one of the four revenue divisions in the district and has 10 mandals under its administration.

== History ==
Atmakur revenue division was formed on 4 April 2022 by the Government of Andhra Pradesh along with the newly formed Nandyal district as part of reorganization of the districts in the state.

== Administration ==
This revenue divisions consist of 10 mandals which are

No.	Mandals
1	Srisailam mandal
2	Atmakur mandal
3	Velugodu mandal
4	Nandikotkur mandal
5	Pagidyala mandal
6	Jupadu Bunglow mandal
7	Kothapalle mandal
8	Pamulapadu mandal
9	Midthur mandal
10	Bandi Atmakur mandal

== See also ==
- List of revenue divisions in Andhra Pradesh
- Nandyal revenue division
- Dhone revenue division
- Banaganapalle revenue division
