= Kanakadripalli =

- Village
- Interactive map of Kanakadripalli
- Location within Andhra Pradesh
- Coordinates: 15°02′39″N 78°04′26″E
- Country: India
- State: Andhra Pradesh
- District: Nandyal
- Mandal: Kolimigundla
- Time zone: UTC+05:30 (IST)
- Pincode: 518123

Kanakadripalli is a village in Kolimigundla mandal Nandyal District, Andhra Pradesh, India. It belongs to the Rayalaseema Area. It is famous for kadapa stones and mines.
