= Ernapadu =

- Revenue Village
- Interactive map of Ernapadu
- Location in Andhra Pradesh, India Ernapadu (India)
- Coordinates: 15.543399°N 78.570344°E
- Country: India
- State: Andhra Pradesh
- District: Nandyal District
- Founder: veeranna

Government
  - Type: Sarpanch

Population (2011)
  - Total: 4,845

Languages
  - Official: Telugu
- Time zone: UTC+5:30 (IST)
- PIN: 518512

Ernapadu is located in Bandi Atmakur mandal, Nandyal District, Andhra Pradesh, India with a population of approximately 8,000 people.
