= Peapully =

- Village
- Interactive map of Peapully
- Location in Andhra Pradesh, India
- Coordinates: 15°16′01″N 77°45′40″E
- Country: India
- State: Andhra Pradesh
- District: Nandyal
- Mandal: Peapully

Area
  - Total: 0.58 km^{2} (0.22 sq mi)

Languages
  - Official: Telugu
- Time zone: UTC+5:30 (IST)
- Postal code: 518221
- Vehicle registration: AP

Peapully (Pyapili) is a village in Peapully mandal, located in Nandyal district of the Indian state of Andhra Pradesh. It is located 15.53 miles (15 km) from the nearest town, Dhone.

== Demographics ==
According to the 2011 Census of India, Peapully has a population 15,200, spread over an area of 3,724 hectares, with 3,299 households. The village has a male population of 7,682 and a female population of 7,518. The Scheduled Caste population is 1,401 and the Scheduled Tribe population is 384. The village has a census location code of 594462.

According to the 2001 census, the population was 13,957, with 7,083 males and 6,874 females. There were 2,748 households in the village.

== Educational Facilities ==
There are two private kindergartens in Peapully. There are four government primary schools, five private primary schools, two government upper primary schools, one private upper primary school, two government secondary schools, and one private secondary school. The is one government junior college and one private junior college. The nearest government arts and science college and polytechnic are in Dhone. The nearest engineering college and vocational training school are in Gooty. The nearest non-formal education center, special education school, medical college, and management college are in Kurnool.

== Medical Facilities ==
There are two doctors and ten paramedical staff in a primary health center in Peapully. In a primary health sub-center, there are no doctors and four paramedical staff. There is one doctor and one paramedical staff member in a veterinary hospital. A mobile clinic is located 5 to 10 km away from the village. The nearest community health center, maternal and pediatric health center, allopathic hospital, alternative medicine hospital, dispensary, family welfare center, and tuberculosis hospital are more than 10 km away from the village.
