= Katasani Rami Reddy =

Indian politician

Member of Legislative Assembly Andhra Pradesh
- In office 2019–2024
- Preceded by: B. C. Janardhana Reddy
- Succeeded by: B. C. Janardhana Reddy
- Constituency: Banganapalle
- In office 2009–2014
- Preceded by: Constituency Established
- Succeeded by: B. C. Janardhana Reddy
- Constituency: Banganapalle

Katasani Rami Reddy (born 1968) is an Indian politician from Andhra Pradesh. He is an MLA from Banaganpalle Assembly constituency in Kurnool district. He won the 2019 Andhra Pradesh Legislative Assembly election representing the YSR Congress Party . He has been nominated again to contest the Banaganpalle seat in the 2024 Andhra Pradesh Legislative Assembly election but he lost the election.

== Early life and education ==
Reddy was born to Katasani Obulreddy and Katasani Obulamma. He spent his childhood in Gundla Singavaram Village, Owk mandal in the erstwhile Kurnool district, which is presently in the new Nandyal district. He completed his degree in arts from Sri Krishna Devaraya University, Anantapur.

== Career ==
Reddy started his political career with Praja Rajyam Party and won the 2009 Andhra Pradesh Legislative Assembly election defeated Challa Ramakrishna Reddy of the Indian National Congress Party by a margin of 13,686 votes. Later, he joined the YSR Congress Party but returned to PRP in May 2011. He continued his party hopping and joined the Congress in May 2012 before rejoining the YSRCP again. He was nominated by the YSRCP to contest the Banaganapalle seat, but lost the 2014 Assembly election to B. C. Janardhan Reddy of the Telugu Desam Party by 17,341 votes. He regained the Banaganapalle Assembly constituency seat winning the 2019 Andhra Pradesh Legislative Assembly election representing the YSR Congress Party. He defeated Janardhan Reddy, this time by a margin of 13,384 votes. In the 2024 Andhra Pradesh Legislative Assembly election he lost to B. C. Janardhan Reddy of the Telugu Desam Party by a margin of 25,566 votes.
