= Kakanur =

- Village
- Interactive map of Kakanur
- Location in Andhra Pradesh, India
- Country: India
- State: Andhra Pradesh
- District: Nandyal
- Mandal: Bandi Atmakur

Languages
  - Official: Telugu
- Time zone: UTC+5:30 (IST)
- PIN: 518523

Kakanur is a village situated in Nandyal district near Nandyal and comes under Bandi Atmakur mandal.
