= Injedu =

- village
- Interactive map of Injedu
- Location in Andhra Pradesh, India
- Coordinates: 15.087°N 78.416°E
- Country: India
- State: Andhra Pradesh
- District: Nandyal
- Mandal: Uyyalawada

Languages
  - Official: Telugu
- Time zone: UTC+5:30 (IST)

Injedu is a village in the Uyyalawada mandal of Nandyal district in the state of Andhra Pradesh in India.
