= Gulladurthy =

- Village
- Interactive map of Gulladurthy
- Location in Andhra Pradesh, India
- Coordinates: 15.1632676°N 78.354355°E
- Country: India
- State: Andhra Pradesh
- Districts: Nandyal
- Mandal: Koilkuntla

Languages
  - Official: Telugu
- Time zone: UTC+5:30 (IST)

Gulladurthy is a village located in Koilkuntla mandal, Nandyal district of Andhra Pradesh, India.
