= Narsipalle =

- village
- Interactive map of Narsipalle
- Country: India
- State: Andhra Pradesh
- District: Nandyal
- Mandal: Uyyyalawada
- Founder: Ramaiah

Languages
  - Official: Telugu
- Time zone: UTC+5:30 (IST)

Narsipalle is a village in the Uyyalawada mandal, Nandyal district in Andhra Pradesh, India.
