= Yaganti temple =

Hindu temple in India

Yaganti
- Sri Yaganti Uma Maheswara
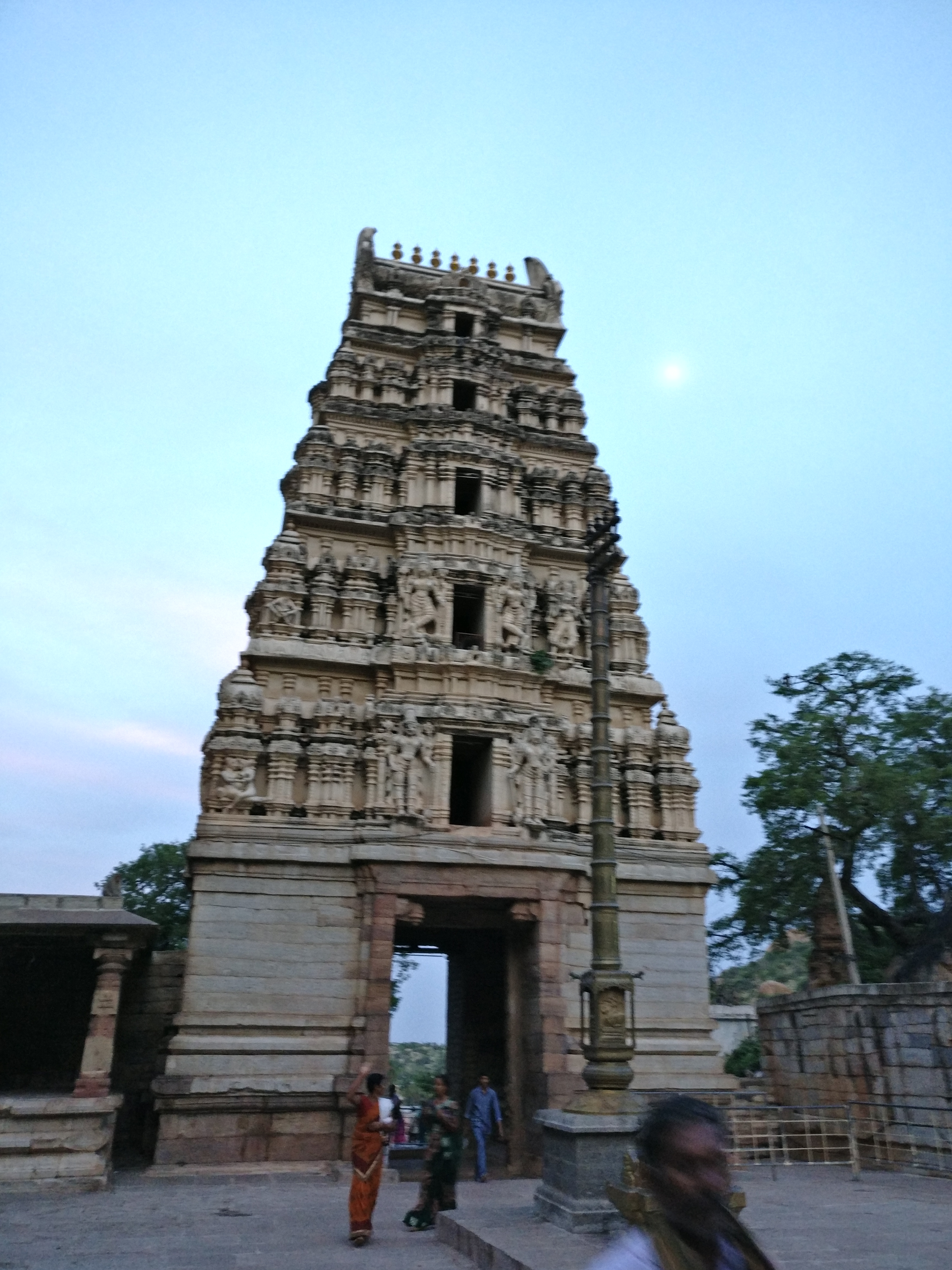
- Yaganti Gopuram Sikharam

- Location in Andhra Pradesh Yaganti temple (Andhra Pradesh)

Religion
- Affiliation: Hinduism
- District: Nandyal
- Deity: Shiva

Location
- State: Andhra Pradesh
- Country: India
- Coordinates: 15°21′3″N 78°08′22″E

Architecture
- Completed: 15th century by Vijayanagar kings Hariharaya and Bukkaraya...

Website
- https://kalagnani.com/

Yaganti Temple or Sri Yaganti Uma Maheswara Temple is a temple of Shiva in Nandyal district in the India state of Andhra Pradesh. It was built according to Vaishnavaite traditions.

== History ==
This temple was constructed by King Harihara Bukka Raya of the Sangama Dynasty of the Vijayanagara Empire in the 15th century. It was built according to Vaishnavaite traditions.

One story of the site's origin is as follows: The sage Agastya wanted to build a temple for Lord Venkateswara on this site. However, the statue that was made could not be installed as the toe nail of the idol got broken. The sage was upset over this and performed a penance for Shiva. When Shiva appeared, he said the place suits Shiva better as it resembles Kailash. Agastya then requested Shiva to give the devotees a Parvathi Goddess as Lord Uma Maheswara in a single stone, which Shiva obliged.

A second story is as follows: Chitteppa, a devotee of Shiva, was worshiping Shiva and Shiva appeared to him as a tiger. Chitteppa understood that it was Lord Shiva in tiger form, and shouted Neganti Shivanu ne kanti (meaning: I saw Shiva I saw), and danced with joy. There is a cave called Chitteppa nearby. Sri Yaganti Uma Maheswara Temple is one of the few temples patronized by one of the great dynasties of India. Every year Maha Shivaratri is celebrated and a large number of devotees from all over Andhra Pradesh visit. Shiva, Parvati and Nandi are the main deities in this temple. This temple is 14 km away from Banaganipalli in kurnool dt. The saint lord Veerabrahmendra swami stayed here for some time and wrote Kalagnanam.

== Architecture ==
=== Pushkarini ===
A feature of this temple is its Pushkarini, a small pond of water on the temple premises. Water flows into this Pushkarini from the bottom of hill through the mouth of a Nandi (bull). The water is fresh and sweet, as it comes from the hills. No one knows how the water reaches the pond all year round and this temple architecture in terms of its sculpture shows the skills of ancient Viswakarma Sthapathis. Devotees find that a holy bath in Pushkarini is highly beneficial. After taking a bath in Pushkarini, they pay tributes to Lord Shiva.

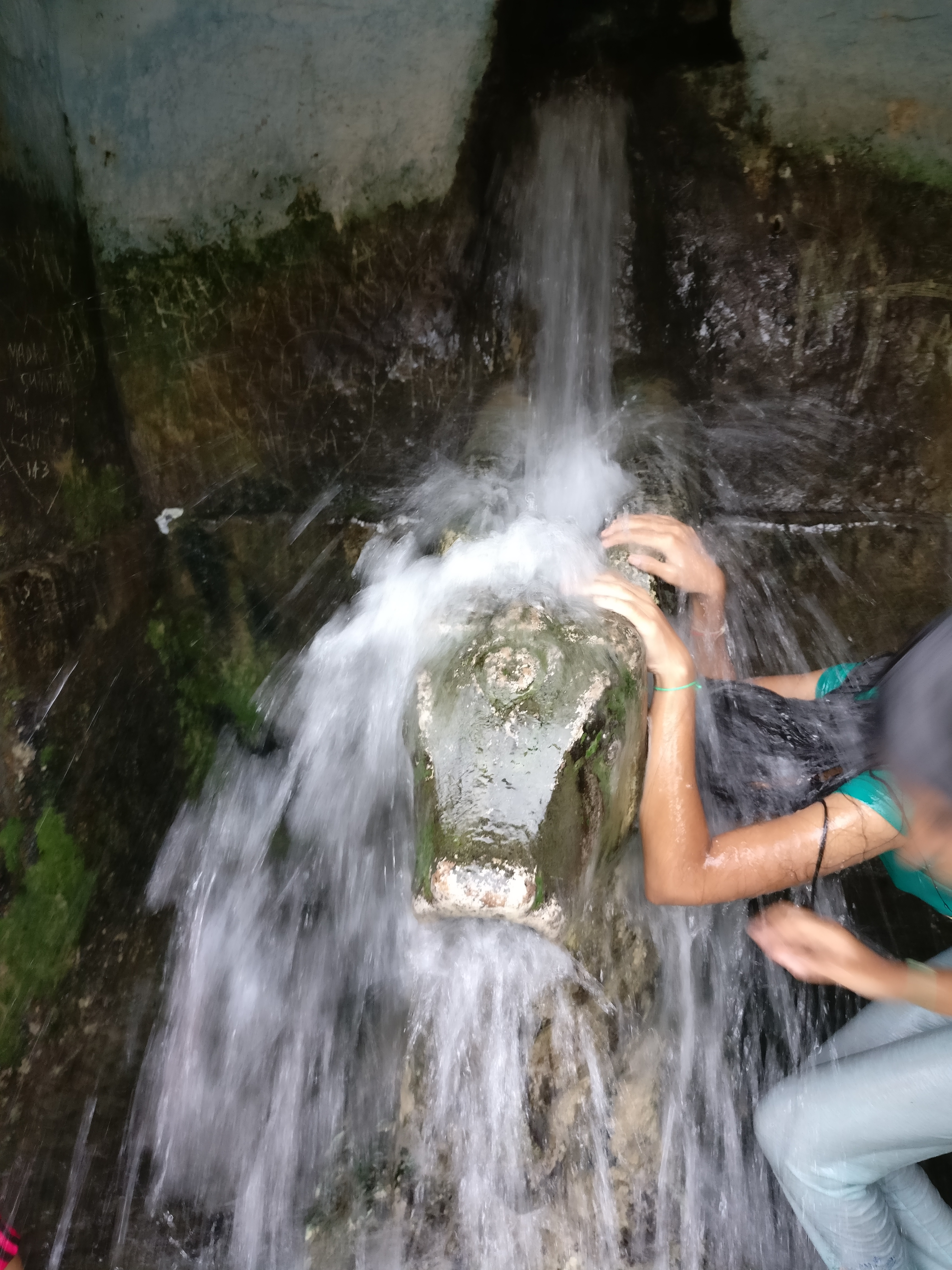
Nandi through which water comes in

The sage Agasthya bathed in Pushkarini and worshipped Shiva.

Caves present in and around yaganti temple are:

=== Agastya Cave ===
This is the cave where Agastya performed his penance for Shiva. One can enter the cave by climbing 120 steep steps. A murti to Devi is installed and may be worshipped here.

=== Venkateswara Cave ===
The damaged murti of Lord Venkateswara is present in this cave. Compared to Agastya cave it is easy to climb though the steps are steep. According to the story this murti was present in this cave before the Tirumala Venkateswara Temple was constructed. But as the murti is damaged near the foot, it could not be worshipped. Sri Sri Potuluri Veera Brahmendra Swami tells us in his Kala Gynanam that this place can stand as an alternative to Tirupati.

=== Veera Brahmam Cave ===
This is the cave where saint Sri Madvirat Potuluri Veera Brahmendra swamy wrote some of his Kala Gnaanam (prophecy). The height of the cave is less and one needs to bend half over to enter it.

== Popular beliefs ==
=== Growing Nandi ===
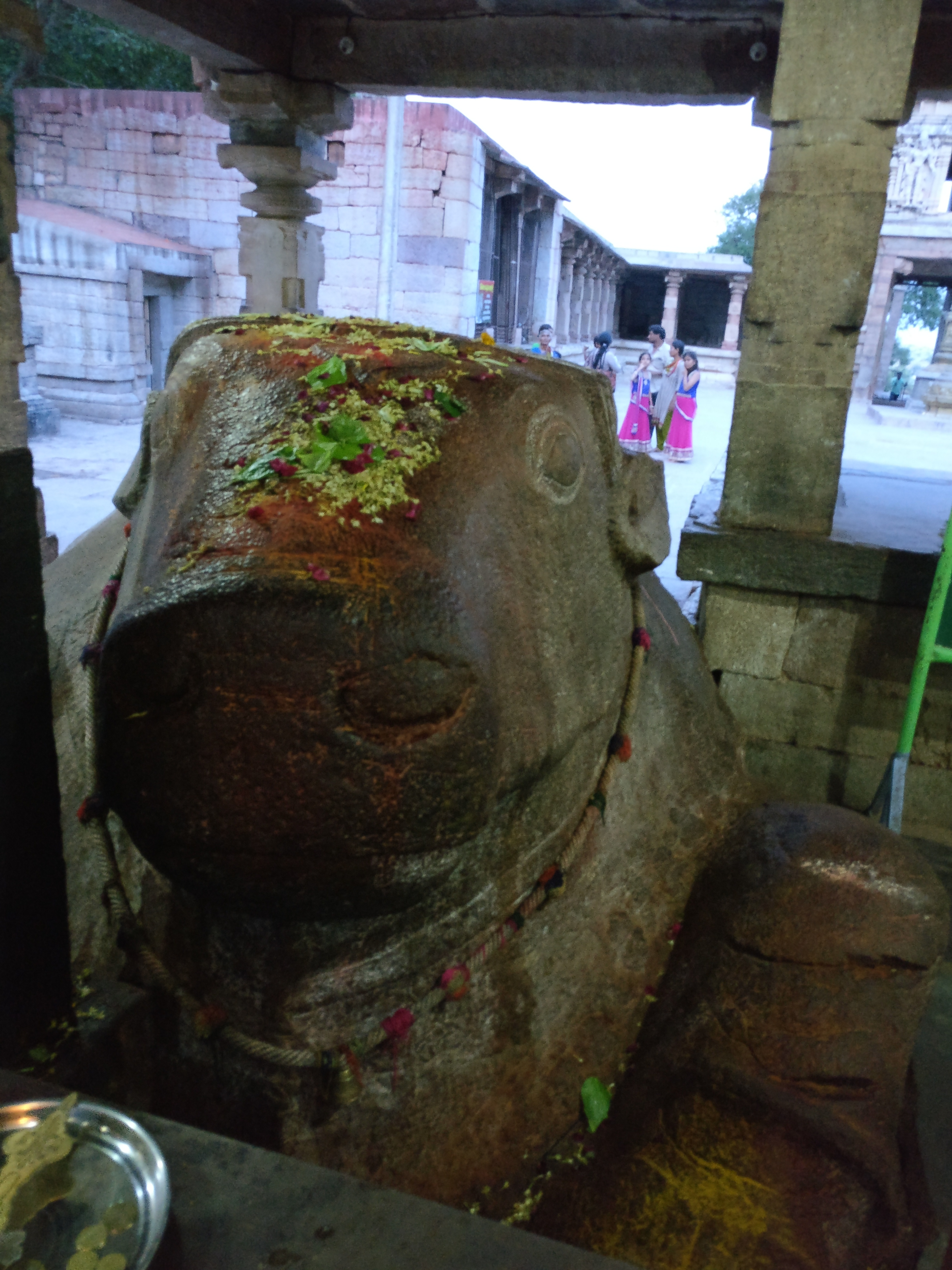
The Yaganti Nandi Statue is believed to be growing in size.

The devotees believe that the Nandi murti in front of the temple is continuously increasing its size. The locals say that the murti was initially much smaller than its present size. They say that certain experimentation was carried out on this murti and it was said that the type of rock out of which the murti is carved has a growing or enlarging nature associated with it.

It is said that people used to do Pradakshinas (rounds) around it in the past. The temple staff has already removed one pillar as the size of the Nandi has increased. According to Sri Madvirat Potuluri Veera Brahmendra swamy, the Basavanna (stone nandi) of Yaganti will come alive and shout when Kali Yuga ends.

=== Absence of Crows ===
Legend has it that while the Sage Agastya was performing his penance, crows disturbed him and he cursed that the crows cannot enter the place. As the crow is the Vahana for Lord Shani, it is believed that Shani cannot enter this place.

== Transportation ==
Yaganti is located in the Nandyal District in the state of Andhra Pradesh, India, approximately 100 km from the city of Kurnool. The temple is 14 km west of Banaganapalle (Mandal headquarters) on the Banaganapalle-Peapully road.we can reach the temple even from the Historic site Belum caves in 1.5hrs and measures a distance of 45 km.

== Gallery ==
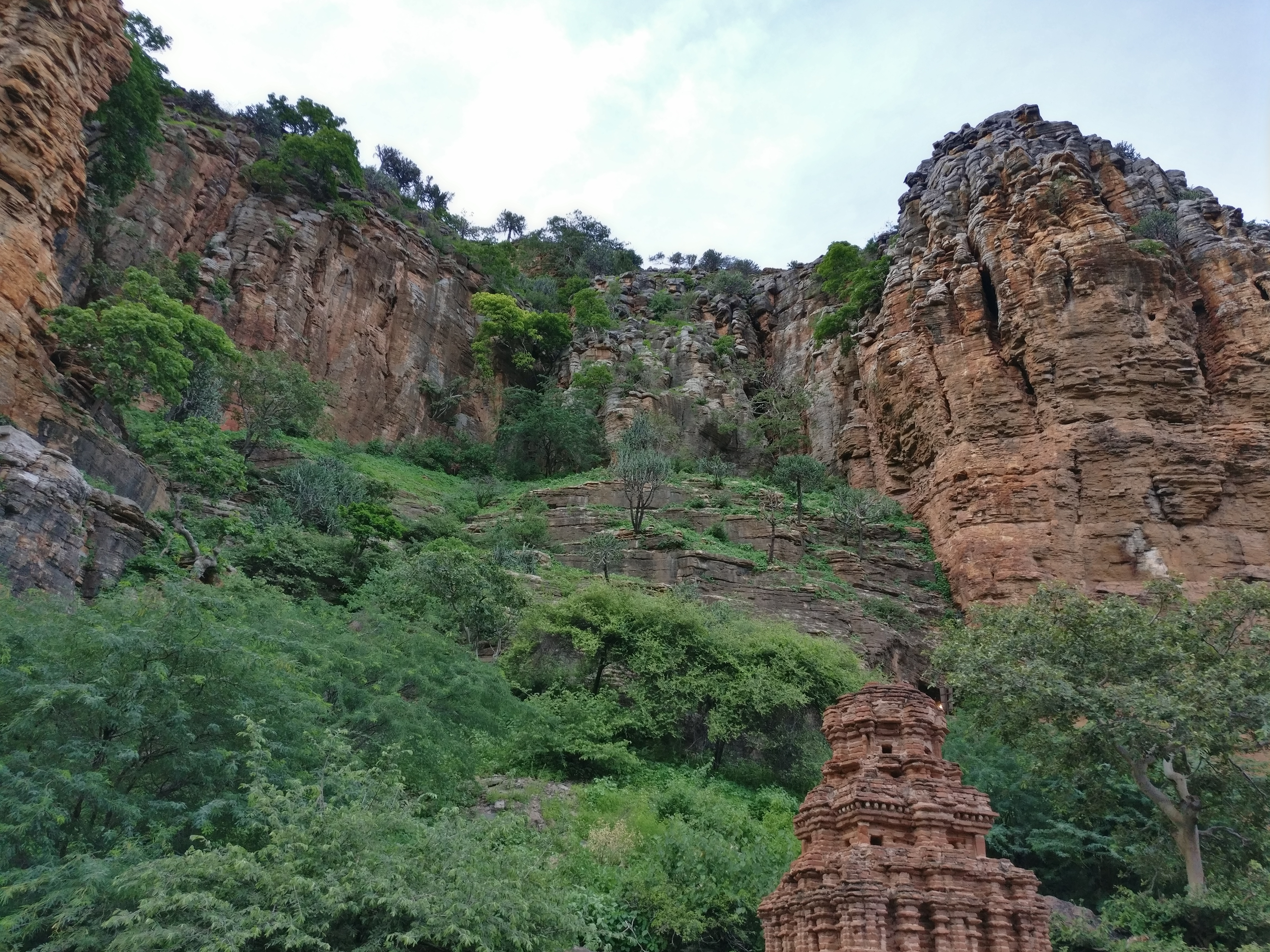
Hills around the temple

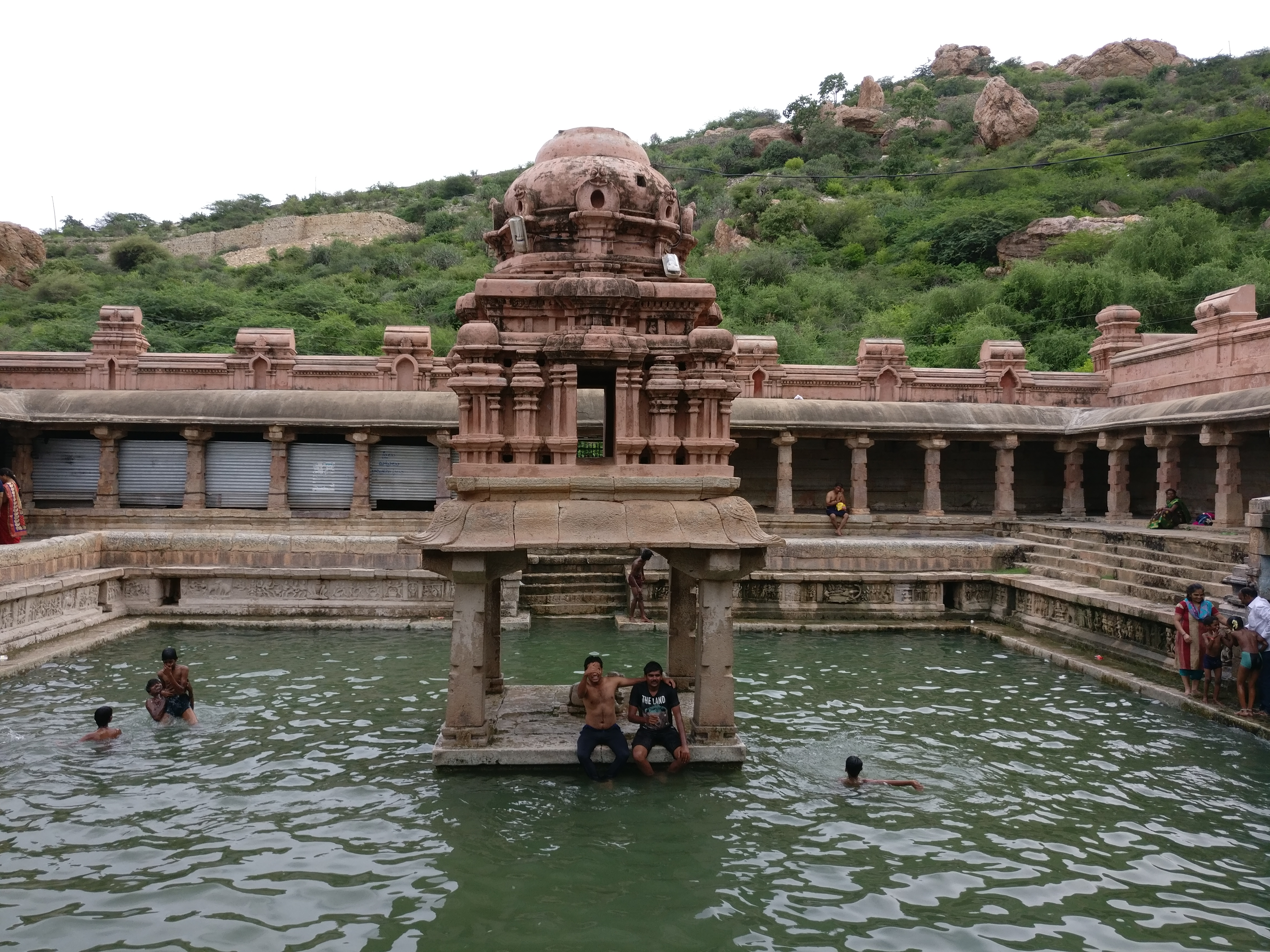
The Pushkarini is suitable for holy baths.

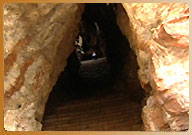
The Agastya cave

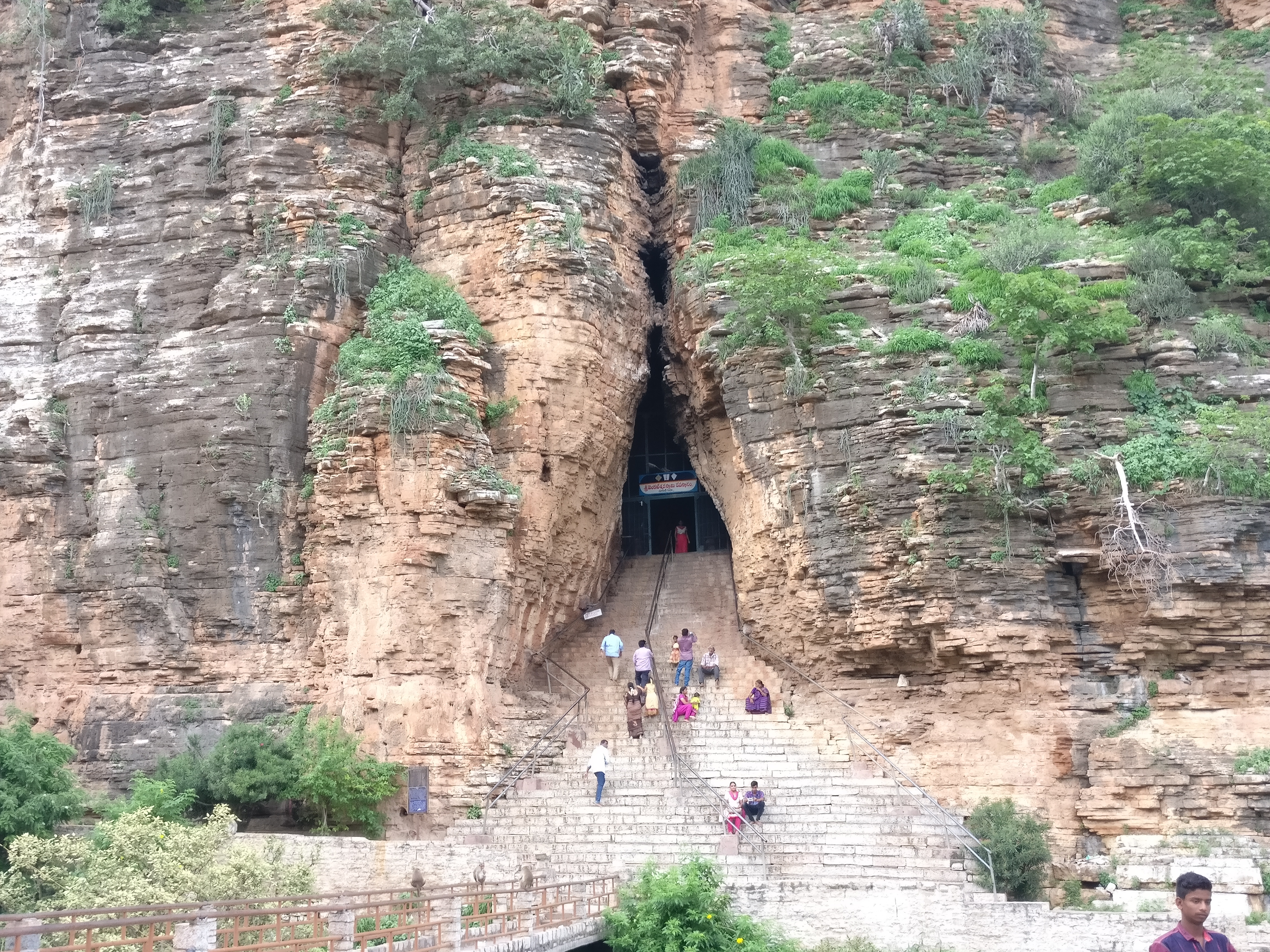
Venkateswara cave

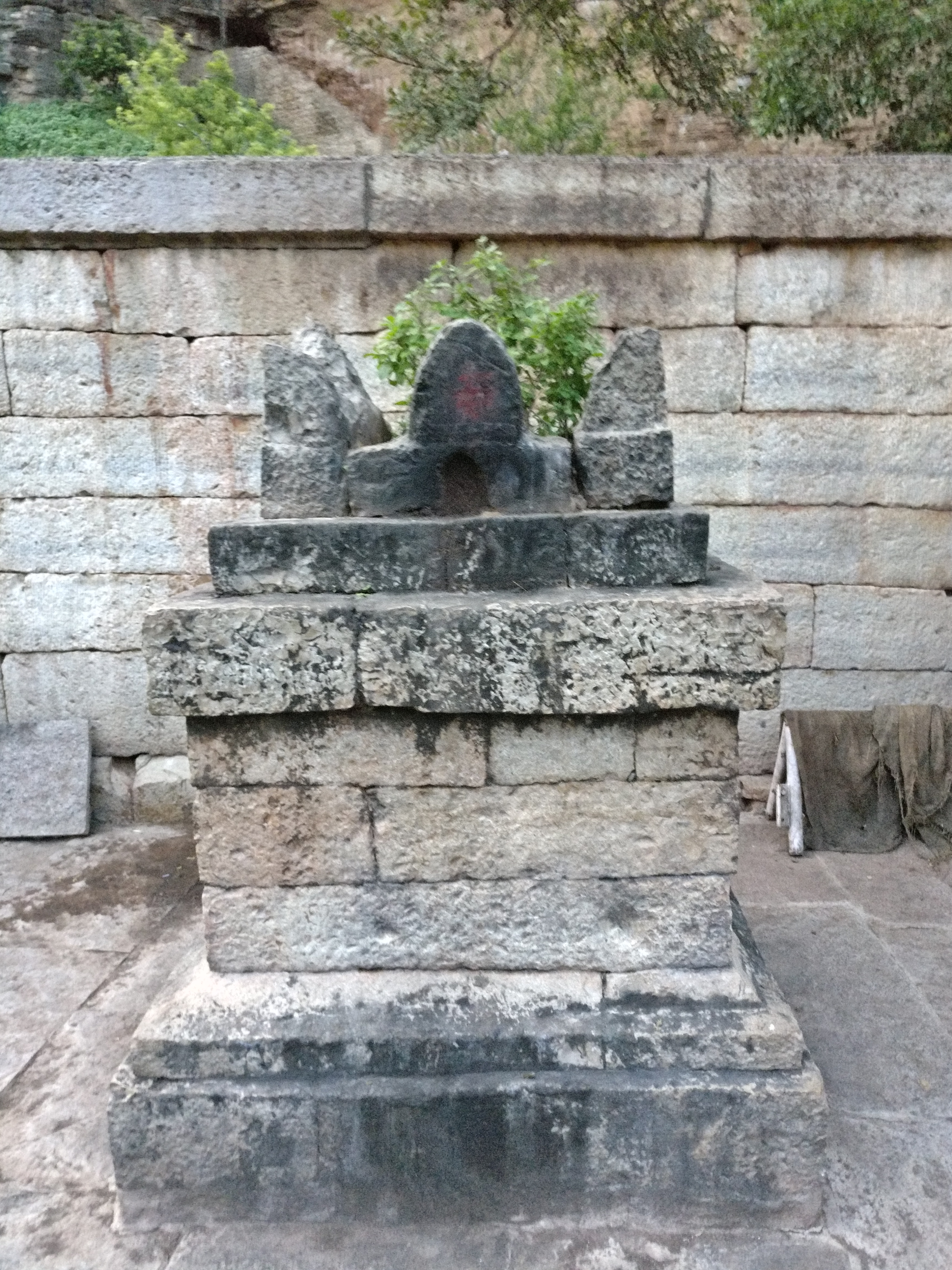
Ancient Tulasi Kota

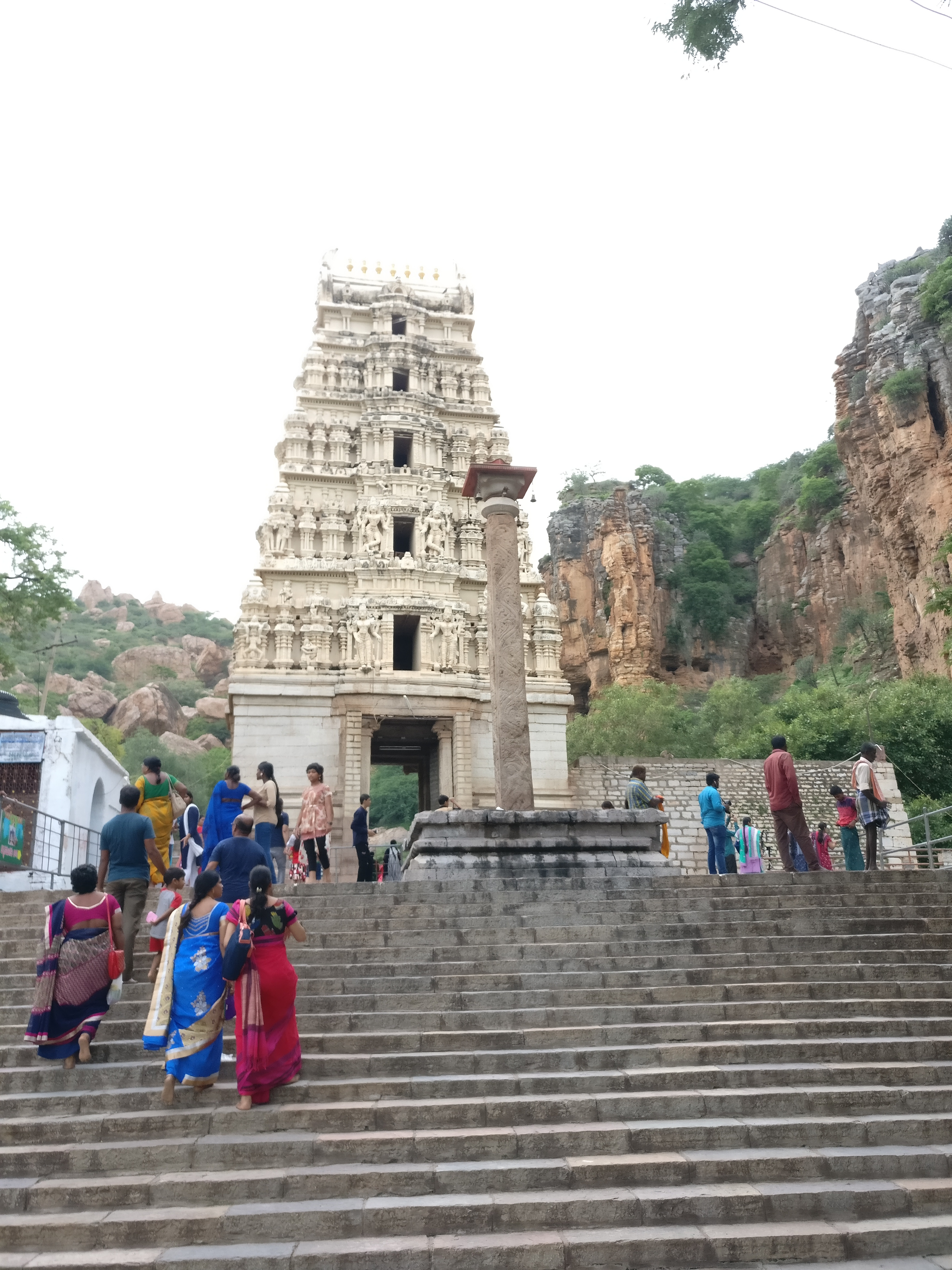
Main Gopuram
