= List of ministers of roads and buildings of Andhra Pradesh =

Minister of Roads and Buildings
- Rahadārūlu mariyu Bhavanāla Śākha Mantrī
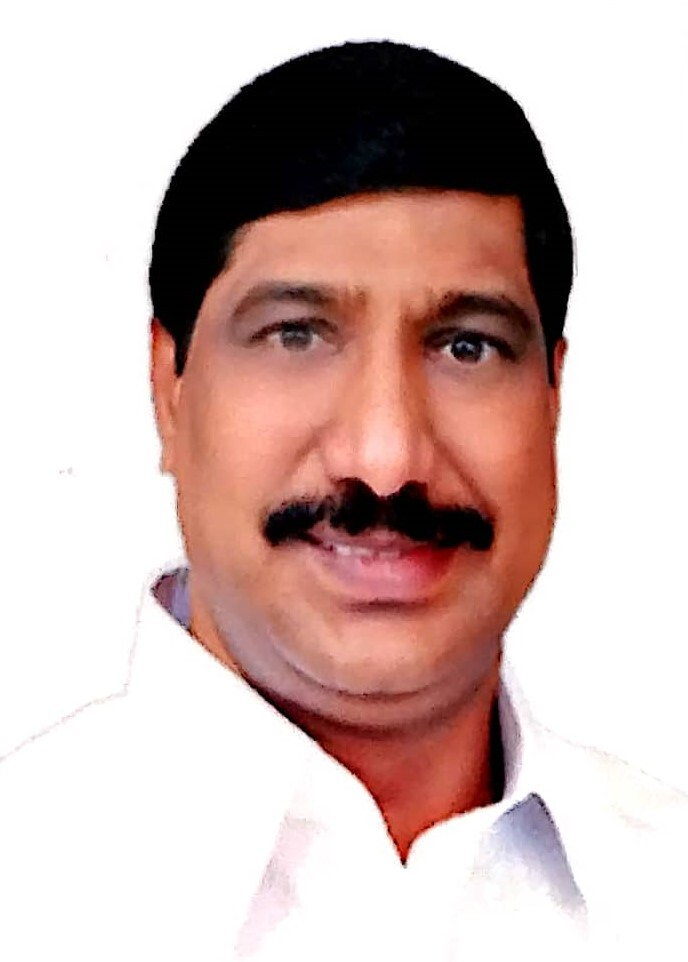
- Incumbent; B. C. Janardhan Reddy since 12 June 2024
- Department of Roads and Buildings
- Abbreviation: R&B
- Member of: Andha Pradesh Cabinet
- Reports to: Governor of Andhra Pradesh; Chief Minister of Andhra Pradesh; Andhra Pradesh Legislature
- Appointer: Governor of Andhra Pradesh; on the advice of the Chief Minister of Andhra Pradesh
- Inaugural holder: Sidda Raghava Rao
- Formation: 8 June 2014
- Website: Official website

The minister for roads and buildings is the head of the Department of Roads and Buildings in the Government of Andhra Pradesh.

The incumbent minister of transport is B. C. Janardhan Reddy from Telugu Desam Party.

== List of ministers ==
#	Portrait	Minister (Lifespan) Constituency	Term of office			Election (Term)	Party	Ministry	Chief Minister	Ref.
#	Portrait	Minister (Lifespan) Constituency	Term start	Term end	Duration	Election (Term)	Party	Ministry	Chief Minister	Ref.
		K. Vijayarama Rao (born 1937); MLA for Khairatabad	11 October 1999	14 May 2004		1999 (11th)	Telugu Desam Party	Naidu II	N. Chandrababu Naidu	
		T. Jeevan Reddy (born 1951); MLA for Jagtial	26 April 2007	20 May 2009		2004 (12th)	Indian National Congress	Rajasekhara I	Y. S. Rajasekhara Reddy	
		Dharmana Prasada Rao (born ) MLA for Srikakulam	25 May 2009	8 August 2013		2009 (13th)	Indian National Congress	Rajasekhara II	Y. S. Rajasekhara Reddy	
		Dharmana Prasada Rao (born ) MLA for Srikakulam	25 May 2009	8 August 2013		2009 (13th)	Indian National Congress	Rosaiah	Konijeti Rosaiah	
		Dharmana Prasada Rao (born ) MLA for Srikakulam	25 May 2009	8 August 2013		2009 (13th)	Indian National Congress	Kiran Kumar	Kiran Kumar Reddy	

#	Portrait	Minister (Lifespan) Constituency	Term of office			Election (Term)	Party	Ministry	Chief Minister	Ref.
#	Portrait	Minister (Lifespan) Constituency	Term start	Term end	Duration	Election (Term)	Party	Ministry	Chief Minister	Ref.
1		Sidda Raghava Rao (born 1957); MLA for Darsi	8 June 2014	1 April 2017	2 years, 297 days	2014 (14th)	Telugu Desam Party	Naidu III	N. Chandrababu Naidu	
2		Chintakayala Ayyanna Patrudu (born 1957); MLA for Narsipatnam	2 April 2017	29 May 2019	2 years, 57 days	2014 (14th)	Telugu Desam Party	Naidu III	N. Chandrababu Naidu	
3		Dharmana Krishna Das (born 1954); MLA for Narasannapeta	30 May 2019	22 July 2020	1 year, 53 days	2019 (15th)	YSR Congress Party	Jagan	Y. S. Jagan Mohan Reddy	
4		Malagundla Sankaranarayana (born 1965); MLA for Penukonda	23 July 2020	7 April 2022	1 year, 258 days	2019 (15th)	YSR Congress Party	Jagan	Y. S. Jagan Mohan Reddy	
5		Dadisetti Ramalingeswara Rao (born 1975); MLA for Tuni	11 April 2022	7 April 2024	1 year, 362 days	2019 (15th)	YSR Congress Party	Jagan	Y. S. Jagan Mohan Reddy	
6		B. C. Janardhan Reddy (born 1960); MLA for Banaganapalle	12 June 2024	Incumbent	2 years, 121 days	2024 (16th)	Telugu Desam Party	Naidu IV	N. Chandrababu Naidu	
