= Srisailam =

- Census Town
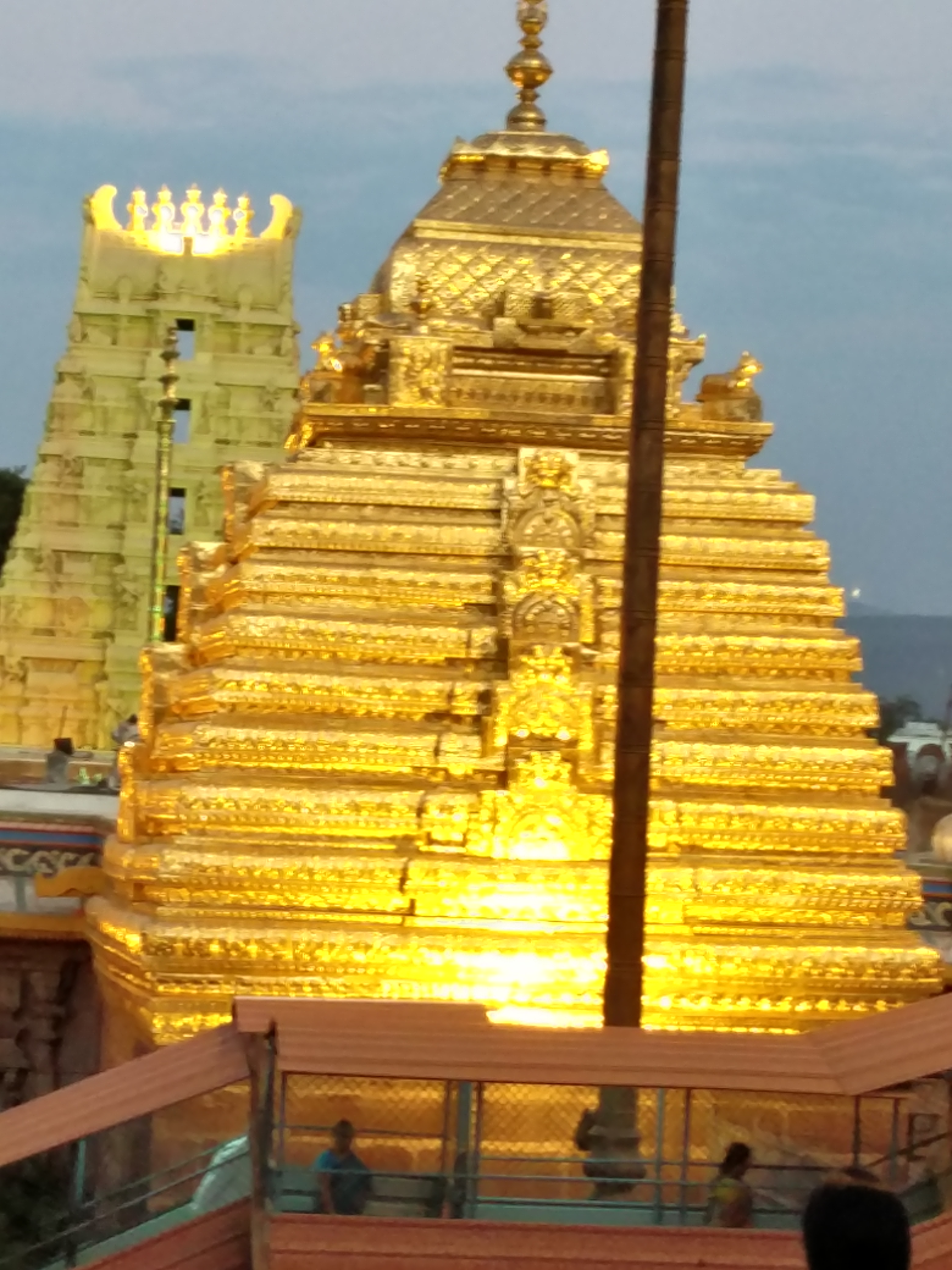
- Srisaila Mallikarjuna temple Vimana

- Location in Andhra Pradesh, India Srisailam (India)
- Coordinates: 16.0833°N 78.8667°E
- Country: India
- State: Andhra Pradesh
- District: Nandyal

Area
  - Total: 5.96 km^{2} (2.30 sq mi)

Population (2011)
  - Total: 21,452
  - Density: 3,600/km^{2} (9,320/sq mi)

Languages
  - Official: Telugu
- Time zone: UTC+5:30 (IST)
- PIN: 518101
- Vehicle registration: AP

Srisailam is a census town in Nandyal district of the Indian state of Andhra Pradesh. It is the mandal headquarters of Srisailam mandal in Atmakur revenue division. It is located about 160 kilometres (99 mi) from the district headquarters Nandyal, 80 kms (49.71mi) from Markapur,180 kilometres (112 mi) from Kurnool,198 kilometres (123 mi) from Nalgonda, 231 kilometres (144 mi) from Hyderabad and 264 kilometres (164 mi) from Vijayawada. The town is famous for the Mallikarjuna Jyotirlinga Temple and is one of the holy pilgrimage sites for the Shaivism and Shaktism sects of Hinduism. The town is classified as both a Jyotirlinga and a Shakta pitha.

As of 2001 census of India, Srisailam had a population of 23,257. Males constituted 54% of the population and females 46%. Srisailam Project (RFC) Township has an average literacy rate of 75.62% higher than the state average of 67.02%. Male literacy is around 85.68% while female literacy rate is 63.24%. 13% of the population is under 6 years of age.

== Tourism ==
Srisailam is one of the notable tourist destinations in Andhra Pradesh and considered one of the most important pilgrimage centres of Lord Shiva.

- Srisailam Dam which was built over Krishna River is one of the major dams in South India.
- Nagarjunsagar-Srisailam Tiger Reserve, India's largest tiger reserve is extend over 3500 km^{2}. This Sanctuary is a natural habitat of diverse species of flora and fauna. The lush and dense Nallamala Forest range is a popular destination for trekking, hill climbing, forest exploration and research, to which Srisailam town acts as a base camp.
- Mallikarjuna Jyotirlinga enshrines Lord Mallikarjuna and is an ancient temple built in a Dravidian style with specimens showcasing the Vijayanagara architecture.
- Sakshi Ganapati Temple- Sakshi Ganapathi temple is located 2 km east of the main temple.
- Akka Mahadevi Caves, Pathalaganga, Shikareshwara Temple are few other attractions in this place.
- Siddi Ramappa Kolanu waterfalls located at Srisailam Half Kilo Meter Distance from Main Temple.

== Education ==
The primary and secondary school education is imparted by government, aided and private schools, under the School Education Department of the state.

== Transport ==
The Andhra Pradesh State Road Transport Corporation operates bus services from Srisailam to Markapur, Atmakur bus stations.

By Foot

There is a path to travel on foot from Atmakur to Srisailam. The Devotees to fulfil their Vow to Lord Shiva will take this path to reach Srisailam on foot from Atmakur. The path completely passes through dense forest of Nallamala Hills. One has to carry their own food and Potable items with them as there are no adequate facilities. This path for devotees is allowed only twice in a year viz.,

1. Maha Shivaratri
2. Ugadi

Road

There are two roads to reach Srisailam as it can be accessed by road from Dornala and Atchampet. The state government-owned Andhra Pradesh State Road Transport Corporation (APSRTC) operates frequent buses from Markapur, Atmakur and Dornala and also from nearby places. The travel by road is not allowed to Srisailam between 9:00 p.m. to 6:00 a.m. as roads are through Nallamala forests.

Rail

The nearest railway station is at Markapur Road Railway Station, about 83.1 kilometres from Srisailam. Markapur Road railway station in the South Central Railway zone of the Indian Railways. It is under the jurisdiction of Guntur Railway Division.

Airport

The nearest airport is Kurnool Airport about 180 kilometres from Srisailam. It is a domestic airport. The nearest major airport is the Hyderabad International Airport located about 217 km (135 mi) from Srisailam.
