= Kambagiri Swamy temple =

Kambagiri Swamy temple is in Kunukuntla village, Owk mandal, in the Nandyal district of Andhra Pradesh.
