= Department of Infrastructure and Investment (Andhra Pradesh) =

Government department of Andhra Pradesh, India

Minister of Infrastructure and Investment
- Maulika Sadupāyālu mariyu Peṭṭubaḍula Śākha Mantrī
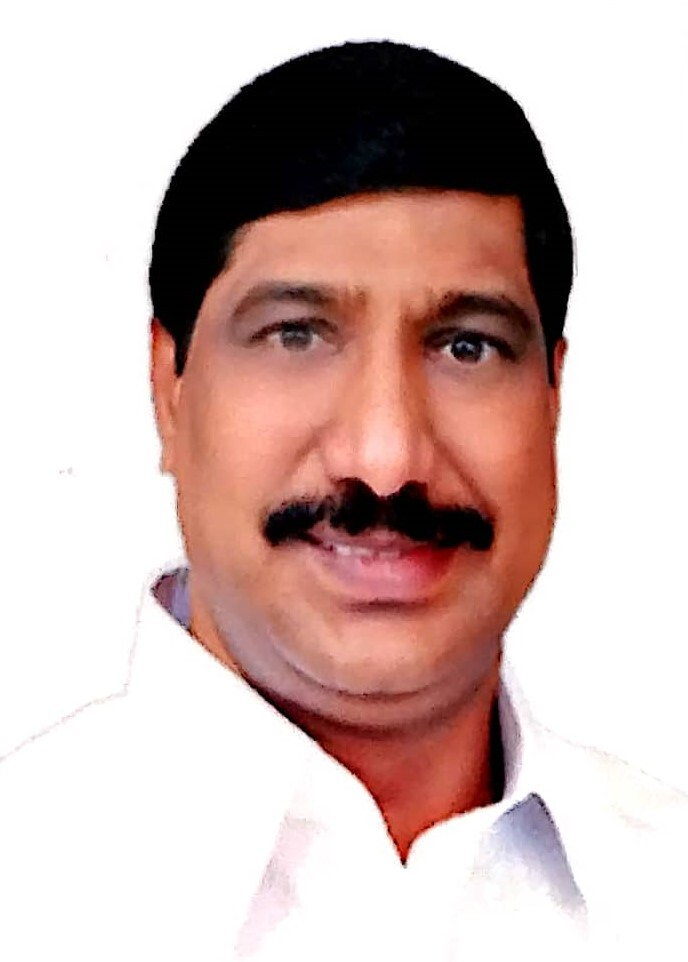
- Incumbent; B. C. Janardhan Reddy since 12 June 2024
- Department of Infrastructure and Investments
- Member of: Andha Pradesh Cabinet
- Reports to: Governor of Andhra Pradesh; Chief Minister of Andhra Pradesh; Andhra Pradesh Legislature
- Appointer: Governor of Andhra Pradesh; on the advice of the chief minister of Andhra Pradesh
- Inaugural holder: N. Chandrababu Naidu
- Formation: 8 June 2014
- Website: Official website

The Minister of Infrastructure and Investment, is the head of the Department of Infrastructure and Investments of the Government of Andhra Pradesh.

The incumbent Minister of Infrastructure and Investment is B. C. Janardhan Reddy from the Telugu Desam Party.

== List of ministers ==
#	Portrait	Minister (Lifespan) Constituency	Term of office			Election (Term)	Party	Ministry	Chief Minister	Ref.
#	Portrait	Minister (Lifespan) Constituency	Term start	Term end	Duration	Election (Term)	Party	Ministry	Chief Minister	Ref.
–		N. Chandrababu Naidu (born 1950); MLA for Kuppam (Chief Minister)	8 June 2014	29 May 2019	4 years, 355 days	2014 (14th)	Telugu Desam Party	Naidu III	N. Chandrababu Naidu	
–		Y. S. Jagan Mohan Reddy (born 1972); MLA for Pulivendula (Chief Minister)	30 May 2019	13 March 2022	2 years, 287 days	2019 (15th)	YSR Congress Party	Jagan	Y. S. Jagan Mohan Reddy	
1		Buggana Rajendranath Reddy (born 1970); MLA for Dhone	14 March 2022	7 April 2022	24 days	2019 (15th)	YSR Congress Party	Jagan	Y. S. Jagan Mohan Reddy	
2		Gudivada Amarnath (born 1985); MLA for Anakapalle	11 April 2022	11 June 2024	2 years, 61 days	2019 (15th)	YSR Congress Party	Jagan	Y. S. Jagan Mohan Reddy	
3		B. C. Janardhan Reddy (born 1960); MLA for Banaganapalle	12 June 2024	Incumbent	2 years, 160 days	2024 (16th)	Telugu Desam Party	Naidu IV	N. Chandrababu Naidu	
