= R.Pampalli =

- village
- Interactive map of R.Pampalli
- Coordinates: 15°08′03″N 78°25′45″E
- Country: India
- State: Andhra Pradesh
- District: Nandyal
- Mandal: Uyyalawada

Languages
  - Official: Telugu
- Time zone: UTC+5:30 (IST)

R. Pampalli is a village in the Uyyalawada mandal of Nandyal district in Andhra Pradesh, India.

== Etymology ==
The original, full name of the village is Renati papampalli. The village is very famous for the great Dattatreya temple.
