= B. C. Janardhan Reddy =

Indian politician

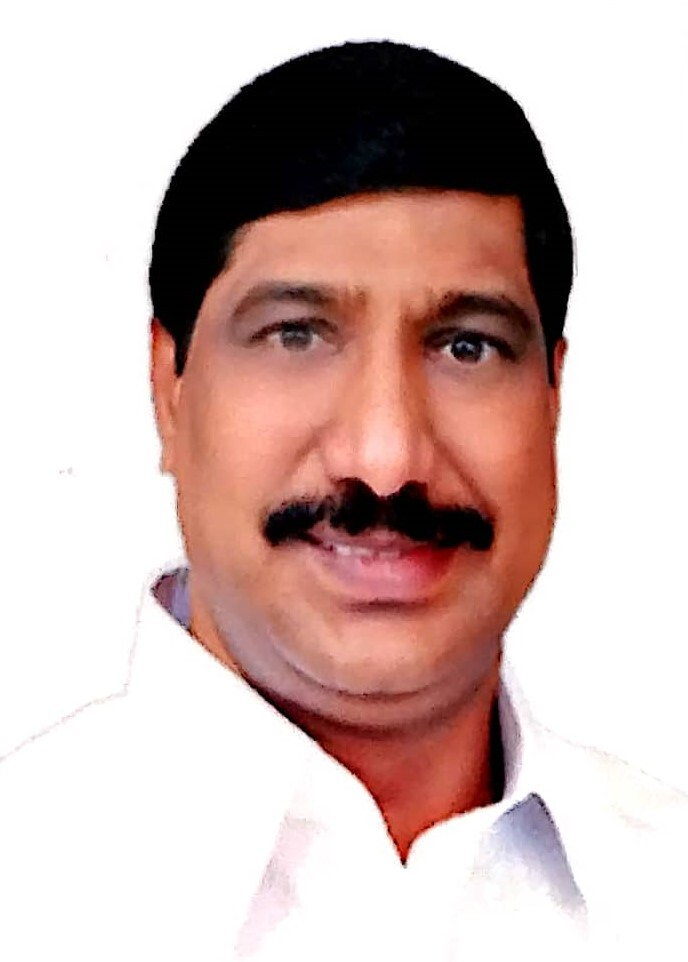

Minister of Road and Buildings Government of Andhra Pradesh
- Incumbent
- Assumed office 12 June 2024
- Governor: S. Abdul Nazeer
- Chief Minister: N. Chandrababu Naidu
- Preceded by: Dadisetti Ramalingeswara Rao

Minister of Infrastructure and Investment Government of Andhra Pradesh
- Incumbent
- Assumed office 12 June 2024
- Governor: S. Abdul Nazeer
- Chief Minister: N. Chandrababu Naidu
- Preceded by: Gudivada Amarnath

Member of the Andhra Pradesh Legislative Assembly
- Incumbent
- Assumed office 4 June 2024
- Preceded by: Katasani Rami Reddy
- Constituency: Banaganapalle
- In office 16 May 2014 – 23 May 2019
- Preceded by: Katasani Rami Reddy
- Succeeded by: Katasani Rami Reddy
- Constituency: Banaganapalle

Personal details
- Political party: Telugu Desam Party

Bobbala Chinnolla Janardhan Reddy is an Indian politician from Andhra Pradesh. He has been a member of the Telugu Desam Party since 2014. He is the MLA of Banaganapalle in Nandyal district. He is currently serving as the cabinet minister in Government of Andhra Pradesh. At present, he is the Minister of Roads & Buildings and Infrastructure and Investments. He won the 2024 Andhra Pradesh Legislative Assembly election from Banaganapalle Assembly constituency.
