= Gadigarevula =

- Revenue Village
- Interactive map of Gadigarevula
- Location in Andhra Pradesh, India Gadigarevula (India)
- Coordinates: 15°37′13″N 78°26′16″E
- Country: India
- State: Andhra Pradesh
- District: Nandyal
- Mandal: Gadivemula

Government
  - Type: Sarpanch

Population (2001)
  - Total: 2,044

Languages
  - Official: Telugu
- Time zone: UTC+5:30 (IST)

Gadigarevula is a village in Gadivemula mandal, Nandyal district of India.
