= Billalapuram =

Billalapuram బిల్లలాపురం
- Village
- Interactive map of Billalapuram
- Location in Andhra Pradesh, India Billalapuram (India)
- Coordinates: 15.491788°N 78.518456°E
- Country: India
- State: Andhra Pradesh
- District: Nandyal district
- Mandal: Nandyal Urban mandal
- Elevation: 211 m (692 ft)

Population
  - Total: 3,021

Languages
  - Official: Telugu
- Time zone: UTC+5:30 (IST)
- Vehicle registration: AP

Billalapuram is a village in Nandyal district, Andhra Pradesh, India. It is located in Nandyal Urban mandal and forms part of the urban region of the district.

== Geography ==
Billalapuram is located in the Rayalaseema region of Andhra Pradesh. The village lies near Nandyal and is connected by local roads to surrounding settlements.

== Demographics ==
According to local administrative records, Billalapuram has a population of approximately 3,021 people.Telugu is the primary language spoken by residents.

== Administration ==
The village is governed by a local gram panchayat under the Panchayati Raj system of Andhra Pradesh.

== Economy ==
Agriculture is the principal occupation of the village population, with cultivation and allied rural activities forming the backbone of the local economy.
