= Dhone =

Dhone Dronachalam
- Town
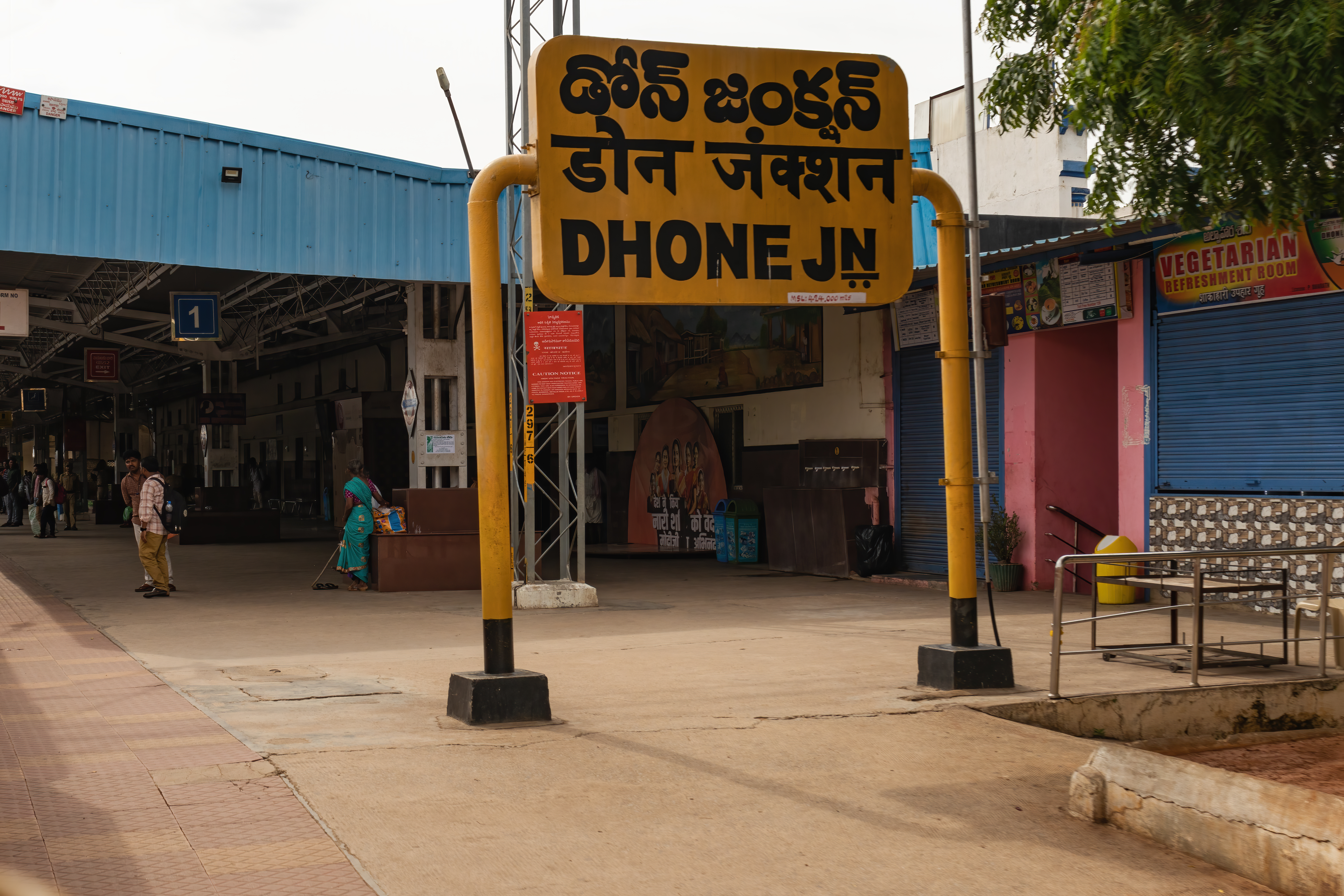
- Dhone Junction Railway Station

- Location in Andhra Pradesh, India
- Coordinates: 15.396°N 77.872°E
- Country: India
- State: Andhra Pradesh
- District: Nandyal

Government
  - Body: Municipality

Area
  - Total: 9.95 km^{2} (3.84 sq mi)

Population (2011)
  - Total: 59,272
  - Rank: 2nd (in Nandyal District)
  - Density: 5,960/km^{2} (15,400/sq mi)

Languages
  - Official: Telugu
- Time zone: UTC+5:30 (IST)
- Postal code: 518222
- Telephone code: +91–8516
- Vehicle registration: AP 21, AP 39

Dhone or Dronachalam is a town in Nandyal district of the Indian state of Andhra Pradesh. It is a municipality located in Dhone mandal, and it is the headquarters of Dhone revenue division.

== History ==
Dhone was formerly known as Dronachalam. Dhone is the second biggest municipality in Nandyal district after Nandyal Municipality. According to local tradition, the name of the village is derived from the name of the tutor Dronacharya, a character in Mahabharata, who meditated on the hill in village. There is now a Hanuman temple, Dargah and church on the hill. Dhone has large deposits of high quality limestone, and it was previously the site of an active quarry. The quarry is no longer in operation. The oldest temple in Dhone is Sri Vasavi Temple, which was constructed in 1916. The Vasavi Temple celebrated 100 at the year 2017.

== Geography ==
Dhone is surrounded by hills on its south. Geographically it is located on Erramala Pin-Code of Dhone is 518222

== Demographics ==
According to 2011 census, Dhone had population of 59,272 of which 29,470 were male and 29,802 were female.

Population of children aged of 0-6 was 7,118, which is 12.01% of the total population of Dhone. The female sex ratio is of 1011 against state average of 993. Moreover, the child sex ratio in Dhone is around 954 compared to Andhra Pradesh state average of 939. The literacy rate of Dhone city is 72.33% higher than the state average of 67.02%. In Dhone, male literacy is around 81.88% while the female literacy rate is 62.96%.

== Economy ==
Dhone has large deposits of high quality limestone. It also have good size of Granite and Polish slab Factories. Dhone is Industrially developing town.

== Governance ==
=== Civic administration ===
Dhone is a Municipality in district of Nandyal, Andhra Pradesh. The Dhone city is divided into 32 wards for which elections are held every five years.

The municipality was established in the year 2005 and has an extent of 9.85 km^{2} (3.80 mi^{2}). During 2010–2011 period, total expenditure per annum was ₹431 crore (US$45 million), while the total income generated per annum was ₹515 crore (US$53 million). The municipality provided 798 public taps, 186 bore-wells, length of 106.28 km (66.04 mi) roads, 1551 street lights, a park, public market, elementary and secondary schools etc.

=== Revenue Division ===
Dhone Revenue Division have six mandals:

1. Dhone
2. Peapully
3. Bethamcherla
4. Banaganapalle
5. Owk
6. Koilakuntla.

=== Politics ===
Dhone is represented by Dhone (Assembly constituency) for Andhra Pradesh Legislative Assembly. Kotla Jayasurya Prakasha Reddy is the present MLA of the constituency representing TDP. Kotla Vijaya Bhaskara Reddy elected as CM for Andhra Pradesh represented Dhone constituency.

Governance
Department	Incharge
Legislative	Dhone MLA, Dhone Municipality Chairman
Executive	Dhone RDO, Dhone MRO
Judiciary	Hon'ble Dhone Court Judge
Police Sub Division	Dhone DSP
Health	CHNC Dhone
APSPDCL Division	Dhone DE
APSRTC Bus Service	Dhone Depot
Transport	Dhone MVI

== Transport ==
=== Railways ===
Dhone Junction railway station is located in Guntakal railway division of the South Central Railway zone. This junction is one of the oldest railway junctions in India.Guntur - Hubli line and Secunderabad - Bengaluru line meet in the Dhone Junction Railway station. Dhone railway station is the biggest railway station in Nandyal district.

=== Roadways ===
The Andhra Pradesh State Road Transport Corporation operates bus services from Dhone bus station. Dhone has bus station situated near National Highway 44, which is called North - South corridor.

=== Distance to major towns and cities ===
1. Kurnool = 52 km (32 mi)
2. Nandyal = 82 km (51 mi)
3. Adoni = 100 km (62 mi)
4. Bethamcherla = 36 km (22 mi)
5. Banaganapalle = 47 km (29 mi)
6. Gooty = 43 km (27 mi)
7. Anantapuram = 95 km (59 mi)
8. Kadapa = 180 km (110 mi)
9. Tirupati = 316 km (196 mi)
10. Bellary = 130 km (81 mi)
11. Hyderabad = 263 km (163 mi)
12. Bengaluru = 310 km (190 mi)
13. Vijayawada = 395 km (245 mi)
14. Visakhapatnam = 745 km (463 mi)
15. Guntur = 357 km (222 mi)

== Villages ==
- Chanugondla
- Dorapalle
- S.Valasala
