= Banaganapalle Assembly constituency =

Constituency of the Andhra Pradesh Legislative Assembly, India

Coordinates: 15.32°N 78.23°E

Banaganapalle
- Constituency No. 140 for the Andhra Pradesh Legislative Assembly
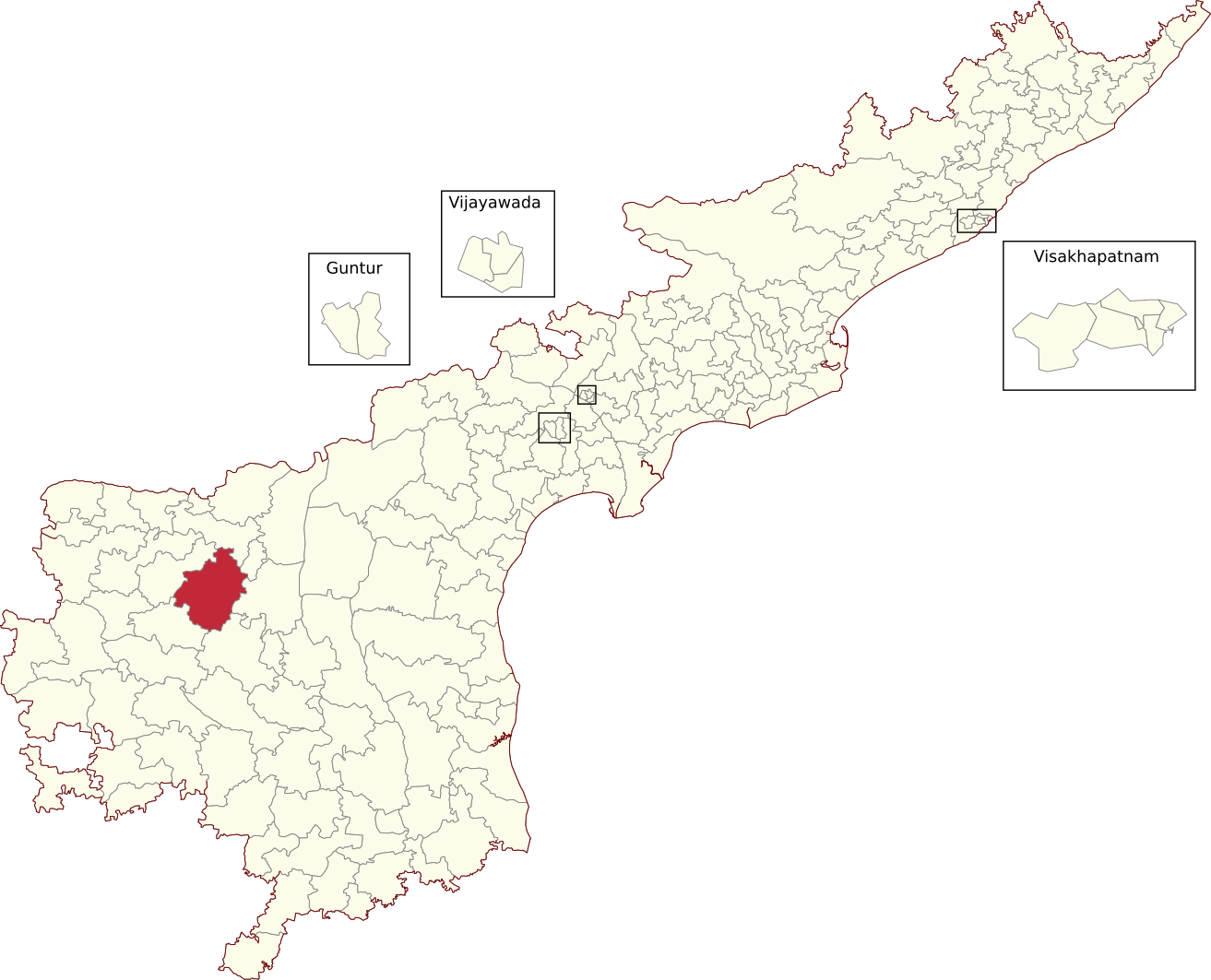
- Location of Banaganapalle Assembly constituency within Andhra Pradesh

Constituency details
- Country: India
- Region: South India
- State: Andhra Pradesh
- District: Nandyal
- Lok Sabha constituency: Nandyal
- Established: 2008
- Total electors: 233,290
- Reservation: None

Member of Legislative Assembly
- 16th Andhra Pradesh Legislative Assembly
- Incumbent B. C. Janardhan Reddy
- Party: TDP
- Alliance: NDA
- Elected year: 2024

Banaganapalle Assembly constituency is a constituency in Nandyal district of Andhra Pradesh that elects representatives to the Andhra Pradesh Legislative Assembly in India. It is one of the seven assembly segments of Nandyal Lok Sabha constituency.

B.C. Janardhan Reddy is the current MLA of the constituency, having won the 2024 Andhra Pradesh Legislative Assembly election from Telugu Desham Party. As of 25 March 2019, there are a total of 233,290 electors in the constituency. The constituency was established in 2008, as per the Delimitation Orders (2008).

== Mandals ==
Mandal
Banaganapalle
Koilkuntla
Owk
Sanjamala
Kolimigundla

== Members of the Legislative Assembly ==
Year	Member	Political party
2009	Katasani Rami Reddy	Praja Rajyam Party
2014	B. C. Janardhan Reddy	Telugu Desam Party
2019	Katasani Rami Reddy	YSR Congress Party
2024	B. C. Janardhan Reddy	Telugu Desam Party

== Election results ==
=== 2009 ===
2009 Andhra Pradesh Legislative Assembly election: Banganapalle
Party	Candidate	Votes	%	±%
PRP	Katasani Rami Reddy	55,438	38.36	
INC	Challa Reddy	41,752	28.89	
TDP	Yerrabothula Venkata Reddy	39,611	27.41	
Majority		13,686	11.47	
Turnout		144,539	75.32	
PRP win (new seat)				

=== 2014 ===
2014 Andhra Pradesh Legislative Assembly election: Banaganapalle
Party	Candidate	Votes	%	±%
TDP	Bobbala Chinnola Janardhan Reddy	95,727	53.31	
YSRCP	Katasani Rami Reddy	78,386	43.65	
Majority		17,341	9.66	
Turnout		179,559	73.98	−1.34
TDP gain from PRP		Swing		

=== 2019 ===
2019 Andhra Pradesh Legislative Assembly election: Banaganapalle
Party	Candidate	Votes	%	±%
YSRCP	Katasani Rami Reddy	99,998	51.28	+7.63
TDP	Bobbala Chinnola Janardhan Reddy	86,614	44.41	−8.90
Majority		13,384	9.66	
Turnout		192,464	82.50	+6.95
YSRCP gain from TDP		Swing		

=== 2024 ===
2024 Andhra Pradesh Legislative Assembly election: Banaganapalle
Party	Candidate	Votes	%	±%
TDP	B. C. Janardhan Reddy	110,603	53.76	
YSRCP	Katasani Rami Reddy	85,037	41.33	
INC	Gutam Pullaiah	3,344	1.63	
NOTA	None Of The Above	1528	0.74	
Majority		25,566	12.43	
Turnout		2,05,740		
TDP gain from YSRCP		Swing		

== See also ==
- List of constituencies of Andhra Pradesh Legislative Assembly
