= Srisailam mandal =

- Mandal
- Interactive map outlining mandal
- Location in Andhra Pradesh, India
- Coordinates: 16.0833°N 78.8667°E
- Country: India
- State: Andhra Pradesh
- District: Nandyal
- Headquarters: Srisailam

Government
  - Body: Mandal Parishad

Area
  - Total: 27.85 km^{2} (10.75 sq mi)

Population (2011)
  - Total: 31,834
  - Density: 1,143/km^{2} (2,960/sq mi)

Languages
  - Official: Telugu
- Time zone: UTC+5:30 (IST)
- PIN: 518101

Srisailam mandal is a mandal in Nandyal district of the Indian state of Andhra Pradesh. It is under the administration of new formed Atmakur revenue division with its headquarters located at Srisailam Project (RFC) Township.

== Demographics ==
As of 2011 census, the mandal had a population of 31,834. The total population includes 16,917 males and 14,917 females —a sex ratio of 882 females per 1000 males. 3,447 children are in the age group of 0–6 years, of which 1,789 are boys and 1,658 are girls. There are 20,644 literates.

== Jurisdiction ==
As of 2011 census, the mandal comprises three villages and one town.

The settlements in the mandal are listed below:

1. Hatakeswaram
2. Sikharam
3. Srisailamgudem Devasthanam
4. Srisailam Project (RFC) Township

== See also ==
- List of mandals in Andhra Pradesh
