= Velugodu =

Coordinates: 15°46′54″N 78°41′21″E

- Village
- Interactive map of Velugodu
- Country: India
- State: Andhra Pradesh
- District: Nandyal
- Talukas: Velgodu

Population
  - Total: 20,000+

Languages
  - Official: Telugu, Urdu
- Time zone: UTC+5:30 (IST)
- PIN: 518533
- Vehicle registration: AP

Velugodu is a village and capital of Velugodu mandal in Nandyal district, Andhra Pradesh, India.

== Geography ==
Velugodu is known for the Telugu Ganga reservoir, near Nallamala Forest. There are temples in the forest, including Yaganandam, Gundla Brammeswaram, and Rudrakodu. The village is situated between Nandyal and Atmakur, on the banks of the Galeru River, which is a tributary of the Penna River. The rivers are connected to the Srisailam Dam reservoir in the Krishna River basin through a deep cut feeder canal from the Pothireddypadu Reservoir. there's a reservoir named teluganga reservoir in velgodu which was built by Nandhamuri Tharaka Rama rao.
