= Miduthuru =

- village
- Interactive map of Miduthuru
- Location in Andhra Pradesh, India
- Coordinates: 15.7667°N 78.3000°E
- Country: India
- State: Andhra Pradesh
- District: Nandyal
- Elevation: 295 m (968 ft)

Languages
  - Official: Telugu
- Time zone: UTC+5:30 (IST)
- Vehicle registration: AP

Miduthuru is a village located in Nandyal district of Andhra Pradesh, India.

== Geography ==
Miduthuru is located at 15.7667°N 78.3000°E. It has an average elevation of 295 meters (968 feet).

Midthur MRO Number and Midthur MRO LIST from 2010 to 2016.
