= Pagidyala =

- Village
- Interactive map of Pagidyala
- Location in Andhra Pradesh, India
- Coordinates: 15.9333°N 78.3333°E
- Country: India
- State: Andhra Pradesh
- District: Nandyal
- Elevation: 269 m (883 ft)

Languages
  - Official: Telugu
- Time zone: UTC+5:30 (IST)
- Vehicle registration: AP

Pagidyala is a village in Nandyal district of Andhra Pradesh, India.

== Geography ==
Pagidyala is located at 15.9333°N 78.3333°E. It has an average elevation of 269 meters (885 feet).
