= Chanugondla =

- Revenue Village
- Interactive map of Chanugondla
- Location in Andhra Pradesh, India Chanugondla (India)
- Coordinates: 15.2167°N 78.1167°E
- Country: India
- State: Andhra Pradesh
- District: Nandyal
- Mandal: Dhone

Government
  - Type: Sarpanch

Population (2011)
  - Total: 1,952

Languages
  - Official: Telugu
- Time zone: UTC+5:30 (IST)
- PIN: 518196

Chanugondla village is a village in Dhone mandal, Nandyal district in Indian state of Andhra Pradesh.
