= Pamulapadu =

Coordinates: 15°50′19″N 78°29′32″E

- village
- Interactive map of Pamulapadu
- Location in Andhra Pradesh, India
- Country: India
- State: Andhra Pradesh
- District: Nandyal
- Talukas: Pamulapadu

Languages
  - Official: Telugu
- Time zone: UTC+5:30 (IST)
- PIN: 518442
- Vehicle registration: AP

Pamulapadu is a village and a Mandal in Nandyal district in the state of Andhra Pradesh in India.

Below list of villages comes under this mandal

1. Bhanumukkala

2. Chelimella

3. Iskala

4. Jutur

5. Kambalapalle

6. Maddur

7. Mittakandala

8. Pamulapadu

9. Thummalur

10. Vanala

11. Vempenta

12. Erragudur
