= Nandyal Urban mandal =

- Mandal
- Interactive map of Nandyal Urban mandal
- Location in Andhra Pradesh, India
- Coordinates: 15.48°N 78.48°E
- Country: India
- State: Andhra Pradesh
- District: Nandyal
- Headquarters: Nandyal

Languages
  - Official: Telugu
- Time zone: UTC+5:30 (IST)
- Vehicle registration: AP

Nandyal Urban mandal is a mandal in Nandyal district of Andhra Pradesh, India. It was formed on 8 May 2023 by division of Nandyal mandal.

== Towns and Villages ==
1. Ayyalur
2. Billalapuram
3. Kothapalli
4. Moolasagaram
5. Nandyal
6. Noonepalli
7. Udumalpuram
