= Kolimigundla =

Village in Andhra Pradesh, India

- Village
- Location in Andhra Pradesh, India Kolimigundla (India)
- Coordinates: 15°04′32″N 78°06′30″E
- Country: India
- State: Andhra Pradesh
- District: Nandyal
- Elevation: 243 m (797 ft)

Languages
  - Official: Telugu
- Time zone: UTC+5:30 (IST)
- PIN: 518123
- Vehicle registration: AP

Kolimigundla (Telugu: కొలిమిగుండ్ల) is a village and headquarters of Kolimigundla mandal in Nandyal district, Andhra Pradesh, India.
