= Jupadu Bunglow =

Coordinates: 15°52′04″N 78°23′08″E

- Village
- Interactive map of Jupadu Bunglow
- Location in Andhra Pradesh, India
- Country: India
- State: Andhra Pradesh
- District: Nandyal
- Talukas: Jupadu bungalow

Languages
  - Official: Telugu
- Time zone: UTC+5:30 (IST)

Jupadu Bunglow is a village and a Mandal in Nandyal district in the state of Andhra Pradesh in India.

== Geography ==
11 villages are currently under this Mandal.
