= Dhone revenue division =

Administrative division in Andhra Pradesh, India

- revenue division in Nandyal district
- Country: India
- State: Andhra Pradesh
- District: Nandyal
- Formed: 4 April 2022
- Founder: Government of Andhra Pradesh
- Headquarters: Dhone
- Time zone: UTC+05:30 (IST)

Dhone revenue division is an administrative division in Nandyal district in the Indian state of Andhra Pradesh. It is one of the four revenue divisions in the district and has 3 mandals under its administration. Dhone is the headquarters of this division.

== History ==
Dhone revenue division was formed on 4 April 2022 by the Government of Andhra Pradesh, along with the newly formed Nandyal district as part of reorganization of districts in the state.

== Administration ==
This revenue division had 6 mandals. 3 mandals were transferred to newly created Banaganapalle revenue division w.e.f. 31 Dec 2025.

1. Bethamcherla
2. Dhone
3. Peapully
