= Nandikotkur =

Nandikotkur Nandikotkuru
- Town
- Interactive map of Nandikotkur
- Location in Andhra Pradesh, India
- Coordinates: 15.8667°N 78.2667°E
- Country: India
- State: Andhra Pradesh
- District: Nandyal

Area
  - Total: 23.14 km^{2} (8.93 sq mi)
- Elevation: 292 m (958 ft)

Population (2011)
  - Total: 46,593
  - Density: 2,014/km^{2} (5,215/sq mi)

Languages
  - Official: Telugu
- Time zone: UTC+5:30 (IST)
- Website: Nandikotkur Municipality

Nandikotkur, natively known as Nandikotkuru, is a grade II municipality town and capital of Nandikotkur mandal in Nandyal district of Andhra Pradesh, India.

== Significance ==
Nandikotkur Assembly constituency is one of the constituencies formed during the early delimitation of electoral boundaries in Andhra Pradesh and has been in existence since the first general elections in 1952.

The constituency is reserved for Scheduled Castes and forms part of the Nandyal Lok Sabha constituency.

It comprises a mix of rural mandals where agriculture is a primary occupation, supported in part by irrigation systems linked to regional river basins. The electorate includes a substantial rural population, and the constituency has regularly participated in state assembly elections since its formation.

== Geography ==
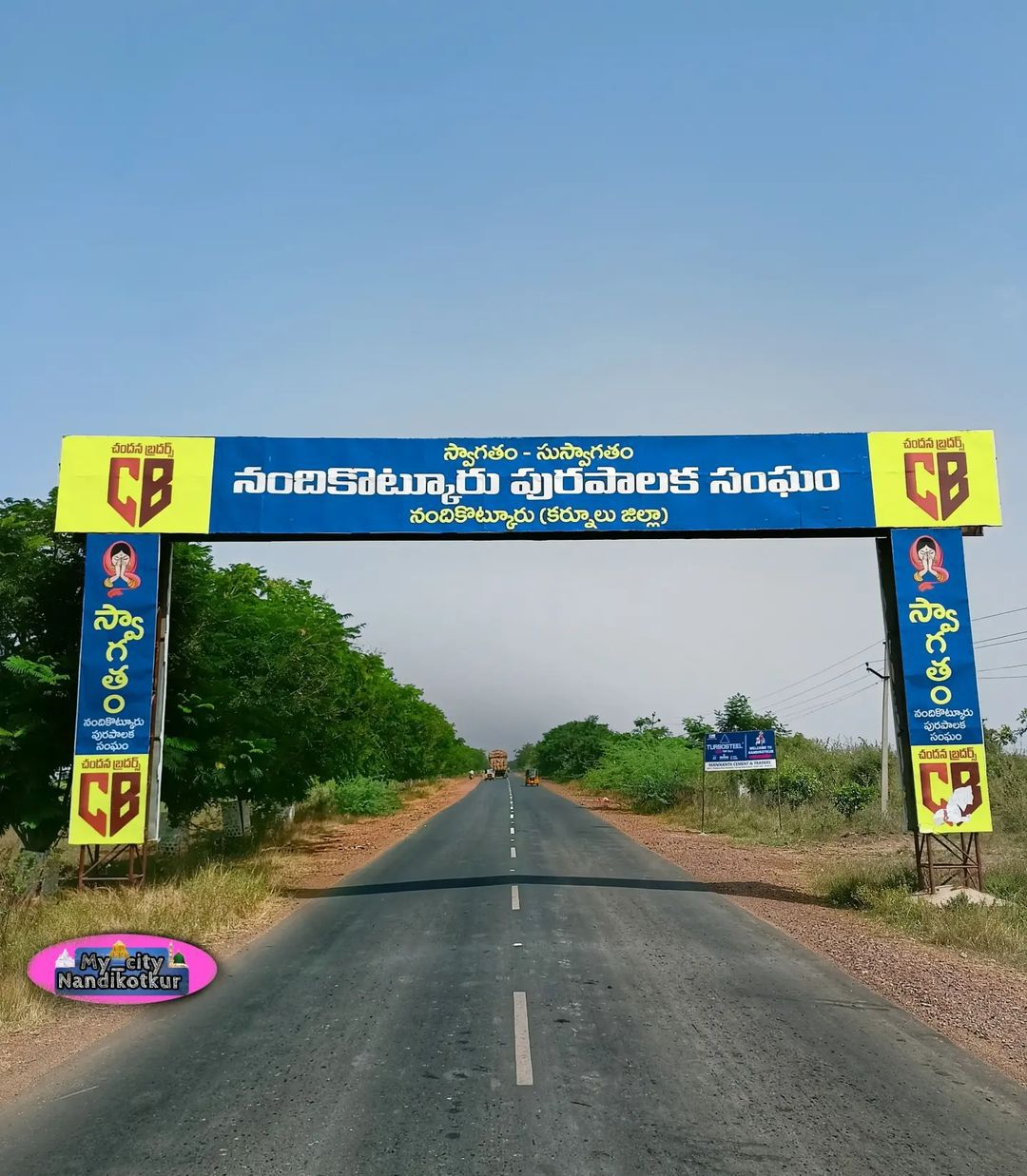
Nandikotkur Town Entrance

Nandikotkur is located at 15.8667°N 78.2667°E. It has an average elevation of 292 meters (961 feet). The nearest river is Krishna river.

Nandikotkur is 27 km from Kurnool and 58 km from Nandyal. It serves as a major transit point connecting Kurnool and Guntur. The route to Srisailam from Kurnool also traverses through Nandikotkur. The legend says that Nandikotkur is surrounded by nine Nandi statues (bulls) and hence this place was earlier called NavaNandikotkur and now this is called Nandikotkur. Handri Neeva Canal which provides irrigation water to Kurnool, Anantapur, Kadapa and Chittoor districts starts from Nadikotkur Mandal only. Sangamaheshwaram the place where seven rivers meet is around 25 km from Nandikotkur. The population of Nandikotkur is 46,953

== Transport ==
The Andhra Pradesh State Road Transport Corporation operates bus services from Nandikotkur bus station.

== Education ==
The primary and secondary school education is imparted by government, aided and private schools, under the School Education Department of the state. The medium of instruction followed by different schools are English, Telugu.
