= Banaganapalle revenue division =

Revenue division in Nandyal district, Andhra Pradesh, India

- revenue division in Nandyal district
- Country: India
- State: Andhra Pradesh
- District: Nandyal
- Formed: 31 December 2025
- Founder: Government of Andhra Pradesh
- Headquarters: Banaganapalle
- Time zone: UTC+05:30 (IST)

Banaganapalle revenue division is an administrative division in the Nandyal district of the Indian state of Andhra Pradesh. It is one of the four revenue divisions in the district and comprises five mandals. The division was formed on 31 December 2025 as part of the district consolidation and administrative reorganisation undertaken by the Government of Andhra Pradesh during the 2025 restructuring of districts.

This revenue division contains 5 mandals under its administration which include:

1. Banaganapalli
2. Kolimigundla
3. Koilkuntla
4. Owk
5. Sanjamala
