= Belum Caves =

Caves and archaeological site in India

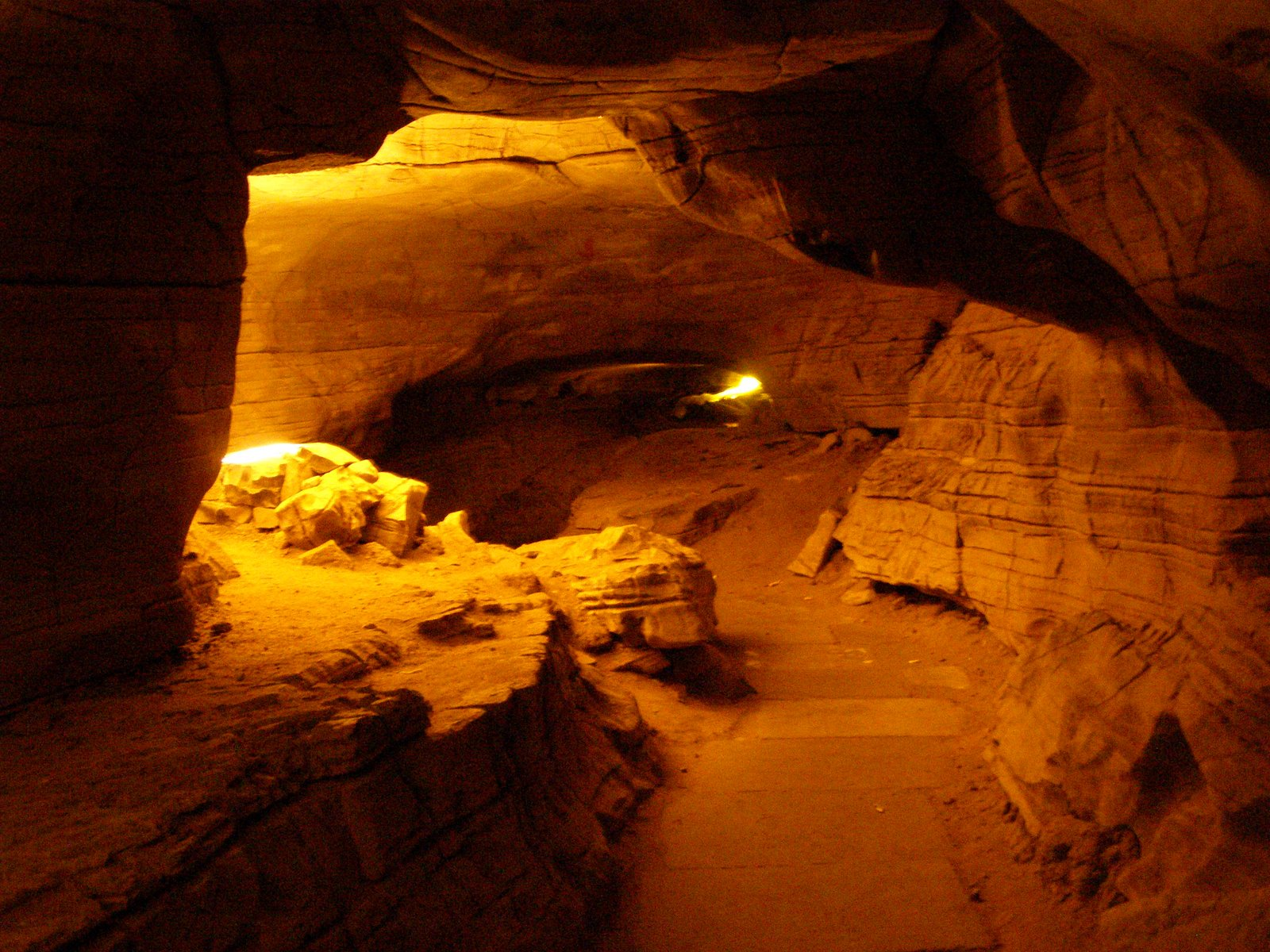
- Interior of Belum Caves

- location in India Belum Caves (Andhra Pradesh)
- 15°6′15″N 78°7′50″E
- Location: Belum, Nandyal district, Andhra Pradesh, India

Belum Caves are a limestone cave system located in Nandyal district of Andhra Pradesh, India. Extending over 3.23 km (2.01 mi), it is the second-largest cave network in the country.

Archaeological evidence indicates human activity in the caves as early as 4500 BCE, and the site was later used by Buddhist and Jain ascetics. The caves were formed by persistent hyrdological erosion during wetter climatic conditions that existed during the Pre-Pliocene period. They feature extensive karst formations, including sinkholes, dolines, stalactites, stalagmites, and other speleotherms. The interior of the caves consist of sediment deposited by the historical Chitravathi River that once flowed through the cave.

Although long known locally, the caves were first documented in 1884 by British geologist Robert Bruce Foote and were systematically mapped in the early 1980s by a German speleological team led by Herbert Daniel Gebauer. It was declared as a protected site in 1988 and opened for tourism in 2002. The Geological Survey of India designated them as a Geo-heritage Site in 2025.

Belum caves was adjudged as the best destination at the Tourism and Travel Fair held in Bangalore in 2002.

== History ==
Archaeological excavations have recovered artifacts dated to 4500 BCE, indicating prehistoric human activity within the cave. The caves were later occupied by Buddhist and Jain ascetics, and several religious relics recovered from the site.

Although Belum Caves were long known to local inhabitants, the first scientific account was published by British geologist and archaeologist Robert Bruce Foote in 1884. The caves received little scientific attention until the early 1980s, when a German speleological team led by Herbert Daniel Gebauer conducted extensive systematic exploration and mapping of the cave system between 1982 and 1984.

The Government of Andhra Pradesh declared the caves as a protected site in 1988. In 1999, the Andhra Pradesh Tourism Development Corporation began developing the site for tourism, and the caves were opened to the public in 2002. In June 2025, the Geological Survey of India designated Belum Caves a Geo-heritage Site.

== Geography and geology ==
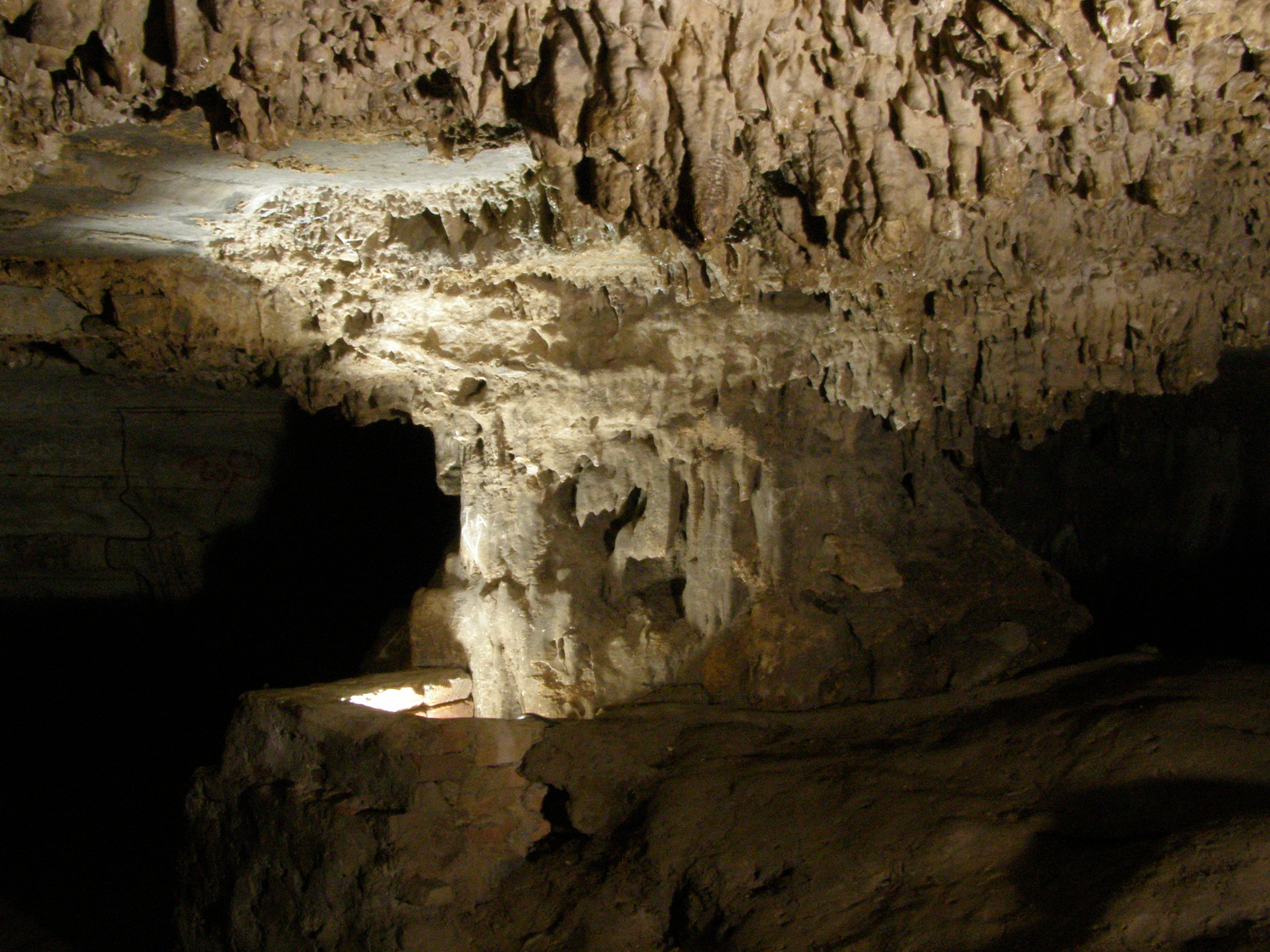
Karst formation inside Belum Caves

Belum Caves are located near Belum village in Kolimigundla mandal of Nandyal district in Andhra Pradesh. The cave system lies beneath predominantly flat terrain and is accessible through three natural entrances on the ground. Extending for 3.23 km (2.01 mi), it is the second-largest cave system in India. The deepest point in the cave is located at 150 m (490 ft) below the ground. There are several such cave systems that occur within the Cuddapah Basin,containing extensive limestone and other rock formations.

Belum Caves contain extensive karst formations formed by the dissolution of carbonate rocks such as limestone and dolomite by groundwater. Over time, this produced an extensive network of underground passages, chambers and other features. The caves preserve a variety of karst landforms, including sinkholes, dolines, and springs at the surface, and stalactites, stalagmites and other speleothems within the cave system. These features are thought to have developed under wetter climatic conditions that existed during the Pre-Pliocene period. The interior of the caves are covered with layered sediments, have been interpreted as deposits left the historical Chitravathi River that once flowed through the cave.

A new cavernicolous species, Andhracoides gebaueri, was discovered in the caves in 2015 and named in honour of Hebert Daniel Gebauer.

== See also ==
- Cave research in India
- List of India cave temples
