= Owk mandal =

Owk mandal Avuku
- Mandal
- Interactive map outlining mandal
- Location in Andhra Pradesh, India
- Coordinates: 15.2167°N 78.1167°E
- Country: India
- State: Andhra Pradesh
- District: Nandyal

Area
  - Total: 476 km^{2} (184 sq mi)
- Elevation: 194 m (636 ft)

Population (2011)
  - Total: 50,452
  - Density: 106/km^{2} (275/sq mi)

Languages
  - Official: Telugu
- Time zone: UTC+5:30 (IST)
- Postal code: 518122
- Vehicle registration: AP

Owk mandal is in Nandyal district of Andhra Pradesh, India. The mandal is part of Banaganapalle revenue division from 31 Dec 2025.

== Geography ==
Owk is located at 15.2167°N 78.1167°E. It has an average elevation of 194 meters (639 feet).

Owk is known for the nearby Belum Caves. The temple of Lord Chennakeshava was built during Krishna Deva Raya's reign by Nalla Thimmaraju, founder of Owk. An avatar of Adisakti worshiped as Mulama here. There is a big reservoir which was built by the then kings of Owk, namely "Thimmaraju Cheruvu".

== History ==
The former zamindars trace their origins back to the 15th century when Bukka obtained the zamindari estate from the Raja of Vijayanagar. Avuku State was founded in 1463 AD the same Thimmaraju who built the Owk tank, the son in law of great emperor Sri Krishna Devaraya, Aliya Rama Rayalu was younger co-brother of Thimmaraju who constructed Owk tank which was known well as Thimmaraju cheruvu at present the same tank was converted as reservoir by raising its bund to 220 feet height the reservoir has internal area of more than 1000 acres and it is main source of irrigation in Ryalasema region and also providing drinking water facility to nearby villages and towns. The descendants of the Thimmaraju by name Nandyala Ramakrishna Raju aged 57, Nandyala Trivikrama Varma aged 55 and he has one son by name Nandyala Avinash Prashanth Varma aged 26 are residing at owk, it has one long street there is a Lord Vishnu Temple constructed by Nandyala Chinna Krishnama Raju in 17th century, There is a Temple by deity name Mullama she is treated as incarnation of Adhiparashakthi and treated as Grama Devatha of Owk Village. There are two water falls namely, Gollaleru and Paleru respectively. Owk princely state was annexed in 1805 to the Hyderabad State.
