= Kolimigundla mandal =

Kolimigundla
- Mandal
- Interactive map of Kolimigundla
- Location in Andhra Pradesh, India Kolimigundla (India)
- Coordinates: 15.0833°N 78.1167°E
- Country: India
- State: Andhra Pradesh
- District: Nandyal
- Elevation: 274 m (899 ft)

Languages
  - Official: Telugu
- Time zone: UTC+5:30 (IST)
- PIN: 518123
- Vehicle registration: AP

Kolimigundla mandal is a mandal in Nandyal district of Andhra Pradesh, India. The mandal is administered from its namesake village Kolimigundla.

== History ==
Kolimigundla mandal used to be a part of Kurnool district and was made a part of the newly formed Nandyal district on 4 April 2022 following the reorganization of districts in the state. The mandal is part of Banaganapalle revenue division from 31 Dec 2025.
