= Bandi Atmakur mandal =

Bandi Atmakur
- Mandal
- Interactive map of Bandi Atmakur
- Location in Andhra Pradesh, India Bandi Atmakur (India)
- Coordinates: 15.48°N 78.48°E
- Country: India
- State: Andhra Pradesh
- District: Nandyal
- Elevation: 203 m (666 ft)

Population (2001)
  - Total: 21,114

Languages
  - Official: Telugu
- Time zone: UTC+5:30 (IST)
- PIN: 518523
- Telephone code: 08514
- Vehicle registration: AP-21

Bandi Atmakur is a Mandal in Nandyal district in the state of Andhra Pradesh in India. It is located about 284 km from Hyderabad, 84 km from Kurnool. And 14 km from Nandyal. Bandiatmakur mandal consists of total 15 villages.

== Administrative Villages ==
#	Villages	Administrative Division	Population
1	Ayyavari Kodur	Bandi Atmakur	3,656
2	Bandi Atmakur	Bandi Atmakur	7,242
3	Bayyapu Kodur	Bandi Atmakur	2,517
4	Bhojanam	Bandi Atmakur	1,163
5	Ernapadu	Bandi Atmakur	4,845
6	Gali Chennaiah Palem	Bandi Atmakur	4,265
7	Kadamalakalva	Bandi Atmakur	3,587
8	Kakanur	Bandi Atmakur	1,536
9	Narayanapuram	Bandi Atmakur	4,825
10	Paramatur	Bandi Atmakur	1,578
11	Parnapalle	Bandi Atmakur	3,456
12	Pedda Devalapuram	Bandi Atmakur	2,243
13	Ramapuram	Bandi Atmakur	2,517
14	Santhajutur	Bandi Atmakur	2,415
15	Yerraguntla	Bandi Atmakur	2,747

== Geography ==
Bandiatmakur is located at 15.48°N 78.48°E It has an average elevation of 203 metres (666 feet).
