= Nandyal district =

District in Andhra Pradesh in India

- District of Andhra Pradesh
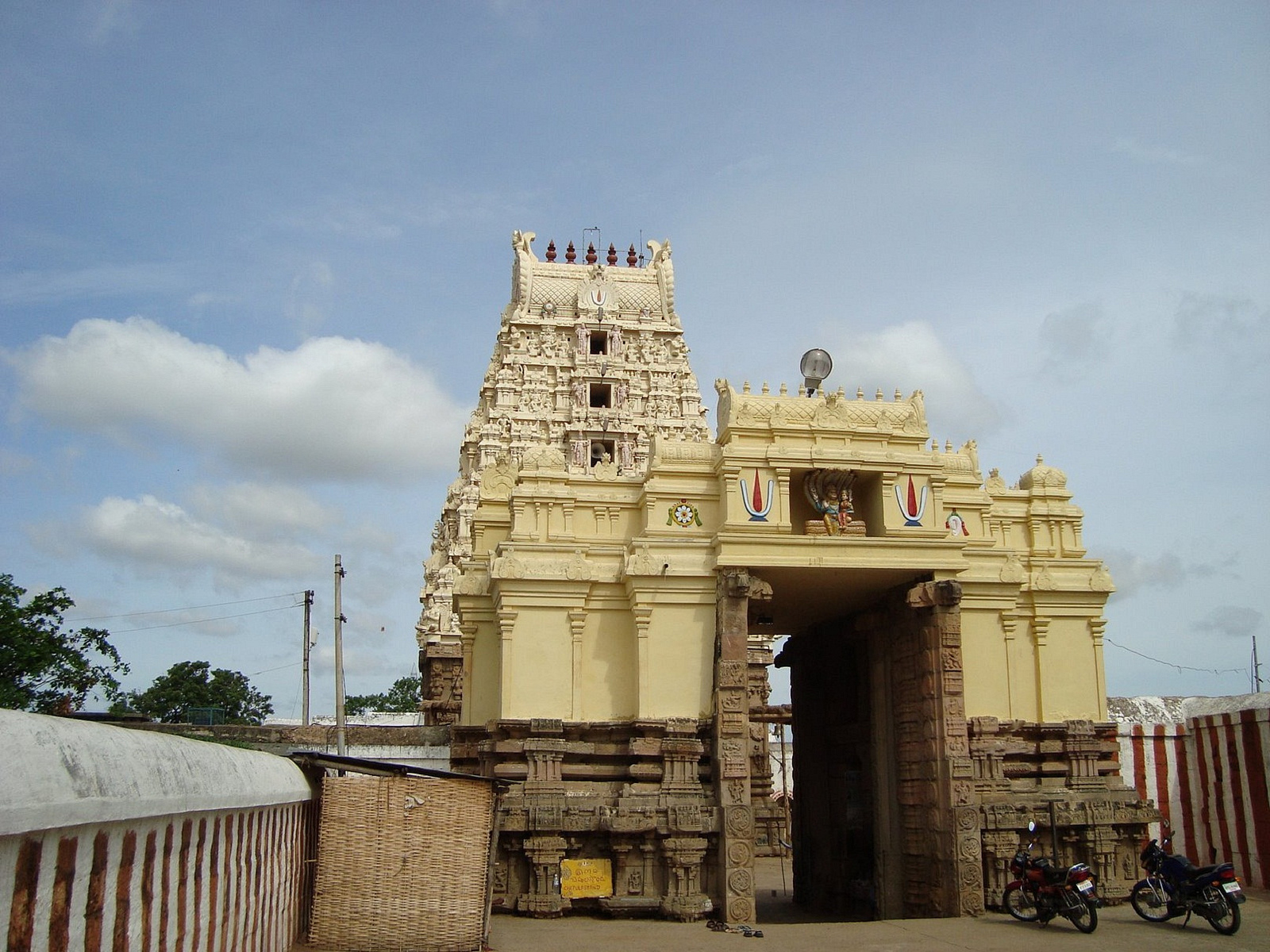
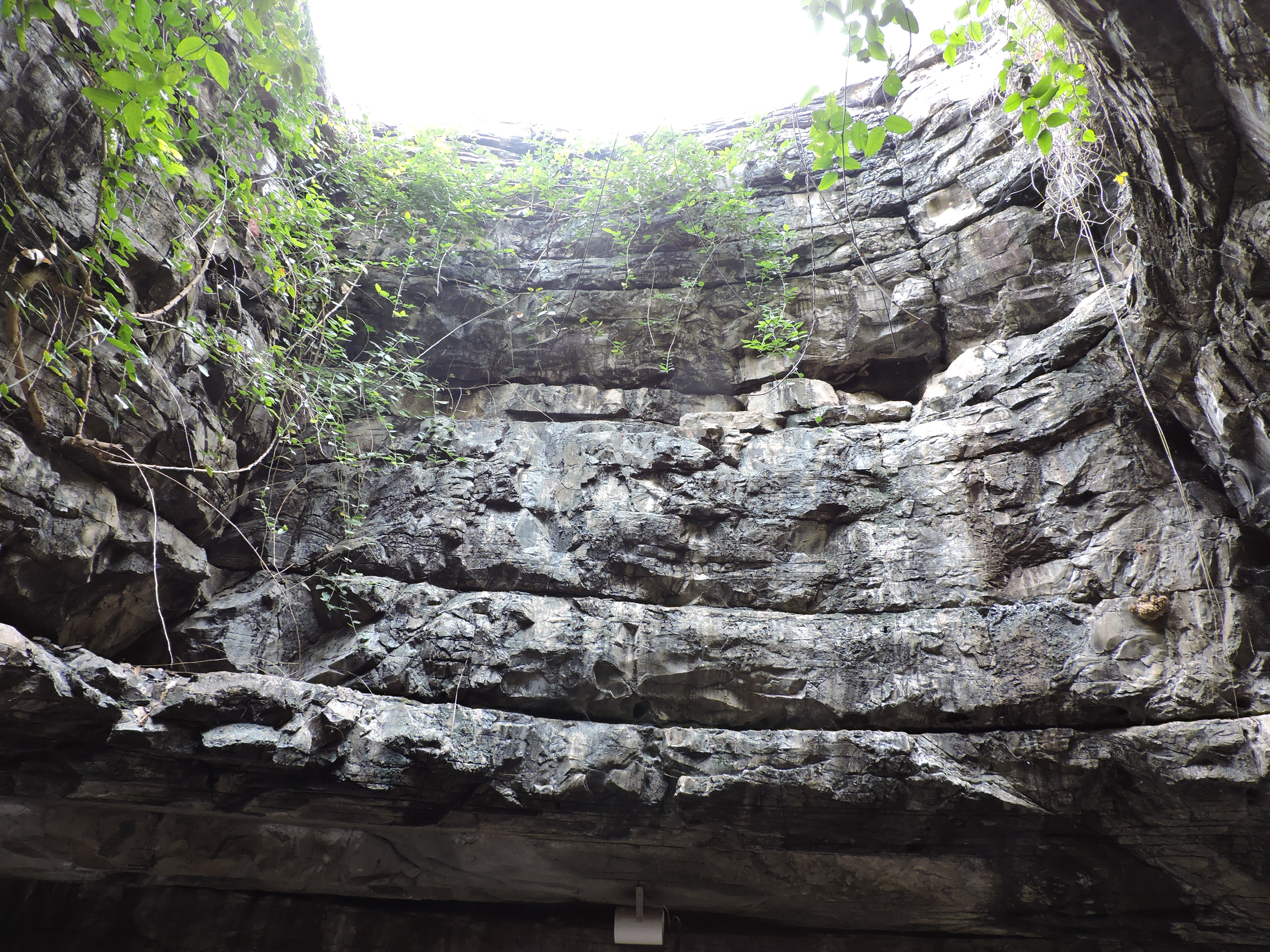
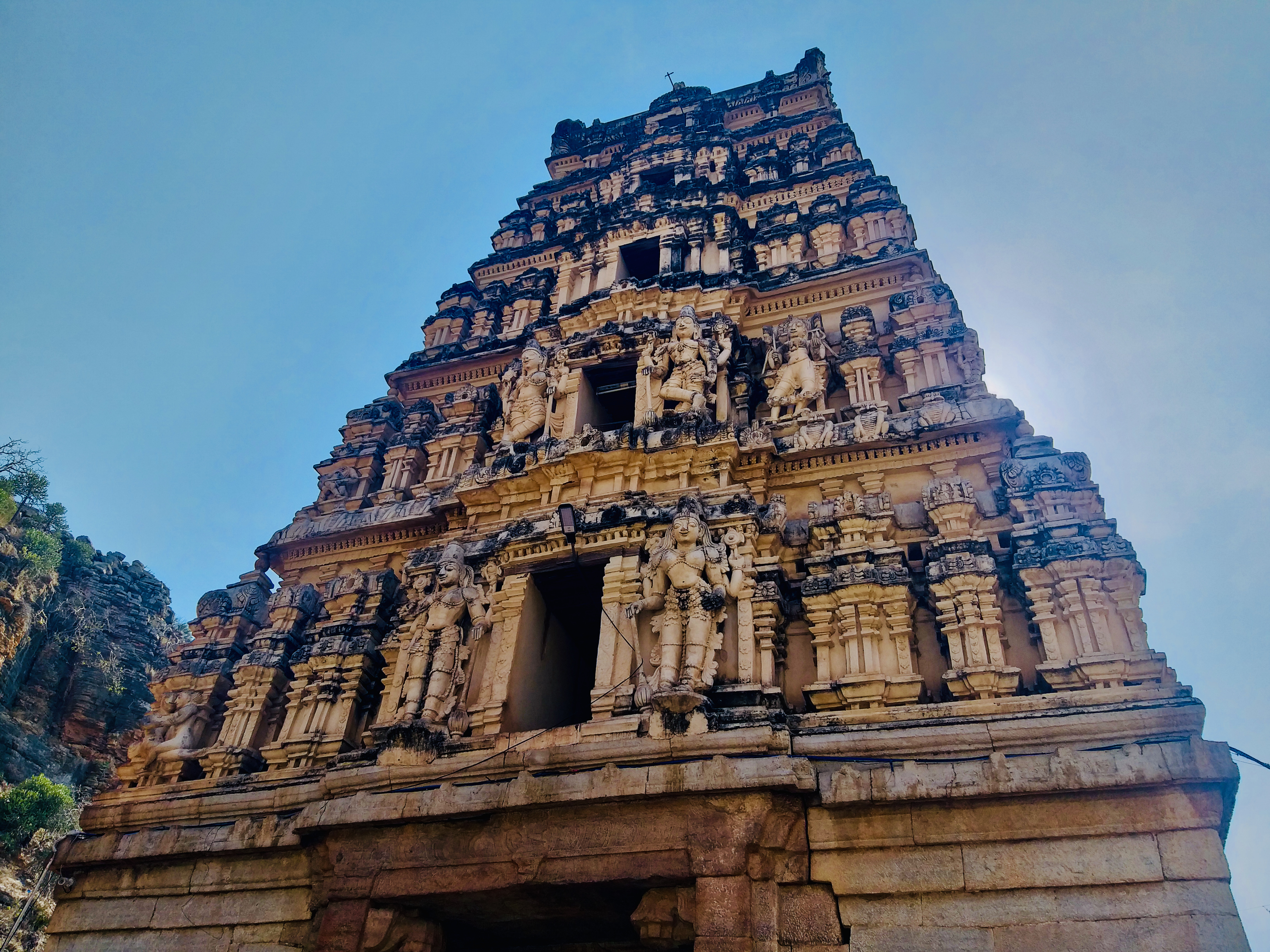
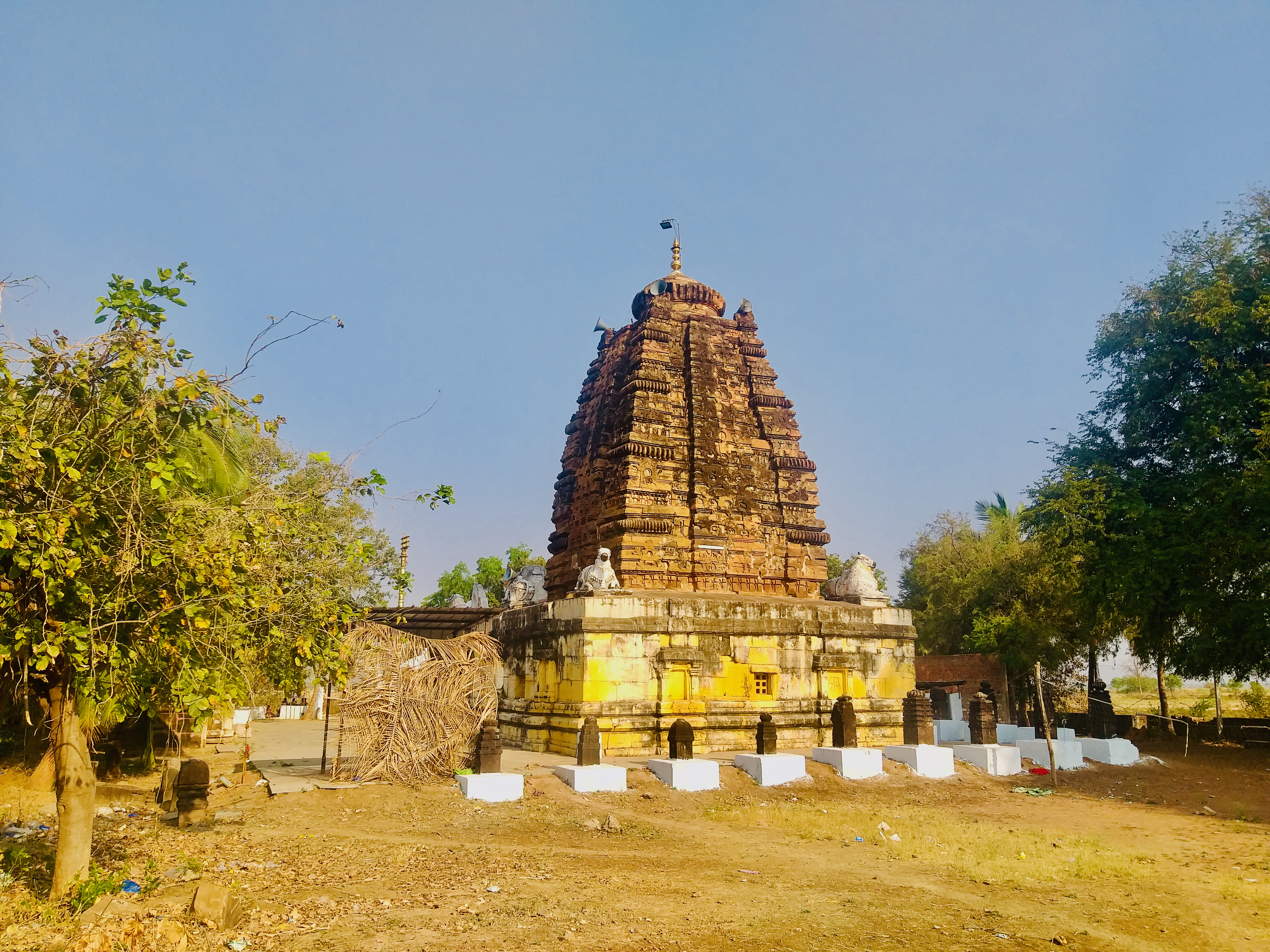
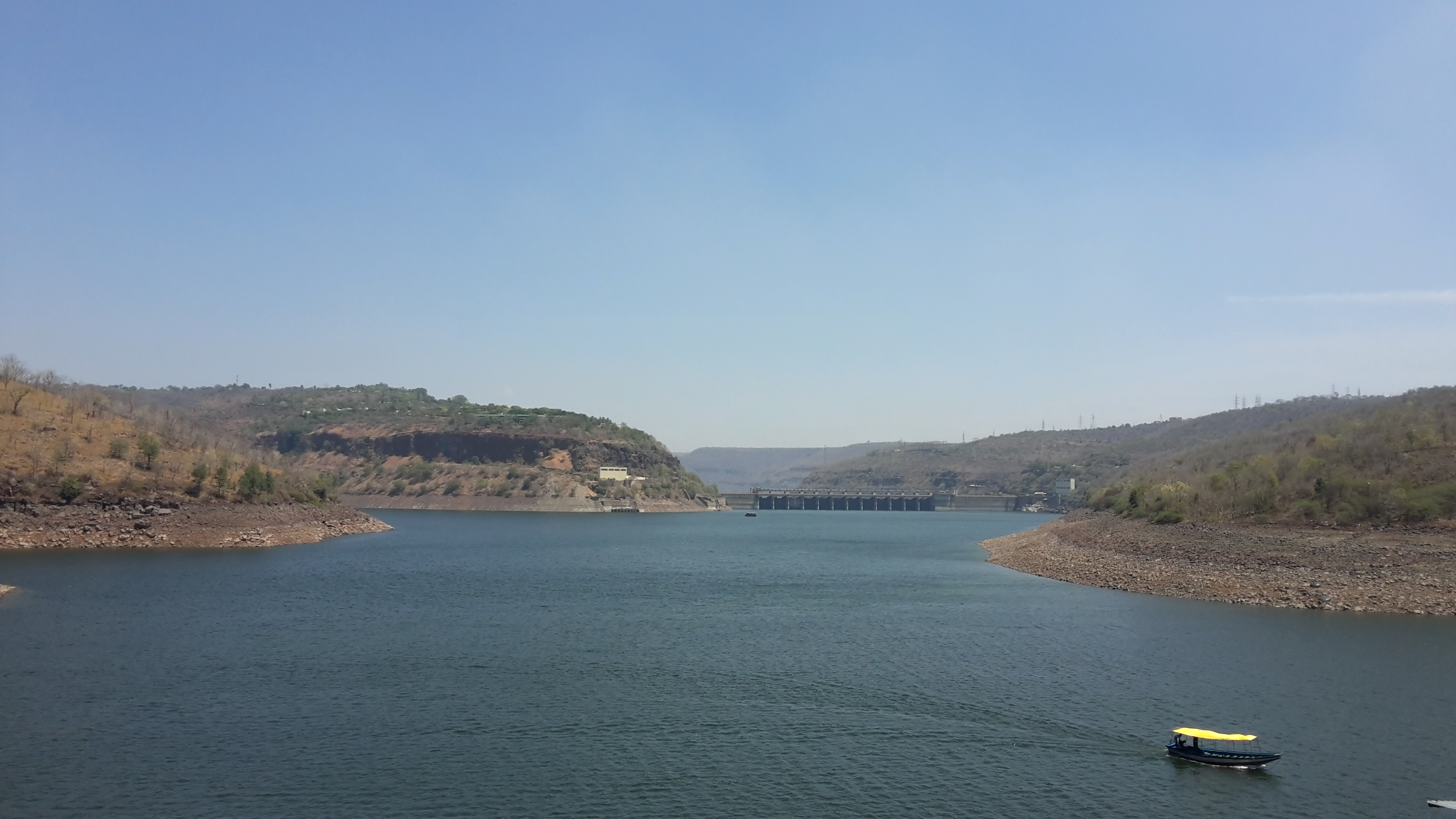
- Clockwise from top-left: Lower temple, Ahobilam, Belum Caves, Yaganti Umamaheshwara Temple, Shivanandishwara Temple in Kadamala Kalva, Srisailam Reservoir

- Location of Nandyal district in Andhra Pradesh
- Interactive map of Nandyal district
- Coordinates: 15.5°N 78.5°E
- Country: India
- State: Andhra Pradesh
- Region: Rayalaseema
- Formed: 4 April 2022
- Founder: Government of Andhra Pradesh
- Headquarters: Nandyal
- Administrative Divisions: 4 revenue divisions; 30 Mandals; 449 villages

Government
  - District collector: Rajakumari Ganiya, I.A.S.

Area
  - Total: 9,681 km^{2} (3,738 sq mi)

Population (2011)
  - Total: 1,781,777
  - Density: 184.0/km^{2} (476.7/sq mi)
- Time zone: UTC+05:30 (IST)
- District LGD code: 755
- District abbreviation: NND
- Website: nandyal.ap.gov.in

Nandyal district is a district in the Indian state of Andhra Pradesh, with the town of Nandyal serving as its district headquarters. Formed on 4 April 2022 after being bifurcated from Kurnool district, it is situated within the Rayalaseema region. The town itself is a Special Grade Municipality and serves as the administrative headquarters for both the Nandyal mandal and the Nandyal revenue division. Administratively, the district comprises five municipalities—namely Nandyal, Dhone, Atmakur, Allagadda, and Nandikotkur—alongside the Bethamcherla Nagara Panchayat.

== Etymology ==
The district derived its name from its headquarters Nandyal. The name Nandyal is derived from Nandi Alayam, which translates to the "abode of Nandi." The area serves as a central hub for nine sacred Nandi shrines, making it a prominent pilgrimage destination since the era of the Vijayanagara Empire.

== History ==
The Belum Caves are a geologically and historically significant cave system within the district. Archaeological evidence indicates that Jain and Buddhist monks occupied these caverns centuries ago, and numerous Buddhist relics discovered inside are currently housed in a museum in Anantapur. The Archaeological Survey of India (ASI) also uncovered vessel remnants and artifacts dating to the pre-Buddhist era, with some items traced back to approximately 4500 BC.

Local historical traditions also associate the region's development with the 14th-century ruler King Nandanamaharaju, who is credited with constructing the Nava Nandula (nine Nandi shrines) around the settlement, anchoring its prominence during the era of the Vijayanagara Empire.

== Geography ==
This district is bounded on the north by Krishna rivers as well as Mahabubnagar district of Telangana State, on the south by Kadapa district and Anantapur Districts on the west by the Kurnool district and on the east by Markapuram district.

Nallamala and Erramala are the two major mountain ranges which run in parallel from north to south of the district running in parallel from north to south. The Erramalas divide the district into two parts.The eastern part of the district lies between Erramalas and Nallamalas. It has mainly black cotton soil. Krishna and Kunderu are the main rivers. Kunderu also known as Kumudvathi originates on the western side of Erramala hills. It flows towards south through Midthur, Gadivemula, Nandyal, Gospadu, Koilakuntla, Dornipadu and Chagalamarri mandals before entering YSR District.

Forest of the district covers an area of 3,08,607 hectares. It is about 32% of the district. It is confined to hilly areas of Nallamala and Erramala and part of Velikonda hills. Tamarind and Beedi leaves are forest's minor produce. Tigers and panthers are the main wild animals. Partridges, peacocks, red jungle foul are some of the birds in the forest. Nagarjuna Sagar – Srisailam wildlife Sanctuary with an area of 46.815 hectares is created in the north of Nallamalas to protect wildlife. Project Tiger was started near Srisailam with an area of 3,568 sq.km. As per 2003 census, there were 64 Tigers and 78 Panthers.

Rollapadu village of Midthur mandal is famous for the spotting of the great Indian Bustard (Batta Meka) an endangered bird. A bird sanctuary with an area of 1,600 hectares was established to protect this species.

== Demographics ==
Religion in Nandyal district based on 2011 Census
Religion	Percent
Hinduism	79.93%
Islam	18.86%
Christianity	0.80%
Other or not stated	0.41%
Distribution of religions

Based on the 2011 census Nandyal district had a population of 1,781,777, of which 385,185 (21.62%) live in urban areas. Nandyal district has a sex ratio of 985 females per 1000 males. Scheduled Castes and Scheduled Tribes make up 322,825 (18.12%) and 52,784 (2.96%) of the population respectively.

Languages of Nandyal district based on 2011 Census
1. Telugu (81.1%)
2. Urdu (17.2%)
3. Others (1.67%)

Based on the 2011 census, 81.08% of the population spoke Telugu and 17.25% Urdu as their first language.

== Administrative divisions ==
The district has four revenue divisions, namely Atmakur, Banaganapalle, Nandyal and Dhone, each headed by a sub collector. These revenue divisions are divided into 30 mandals.

=== Mandals ===
There are 10 mandals in Atmakur division, 5 mandals in Banaganapalle division, 3 mandals in Dhone division and 12 mandals in Nandyal division.

1. Atmakur revenue division
  1. Atmakur
  2. Bandi Atmakur
  3. Jupadu Bunglow
  4. Kothapalle
  5. Miduthuru
  6. Nandikotkur
  7. Pagidyala
  8. Pamulapadu
  9. Srisailam
  10. Velugodu
2. Banaganapalle revenue division
  1. Banaganapalli
  2. Kolimigundla
  3. Koilkuntla
  4. Owk
  5. Sanjamala
3. Dhone revenue division
  1. Bethamcherla
  2. Dhone
  3. Peapully
4. Nandyal revenue division
  1. Allagadda
  2. Chagalamarri
  3. Dornipadu
  4. Gadivemula
  5. Gospadu
  6. Mahanandi
  7. Nandyal Urban
  8. Nandyal Rural
  9. Panyam
  10. Rudravaram
  11. Sirivella
  12. Uyyalawada

== Cities and towns ==
The district has of 6 municipalities namely Nandyal, Dhone, Atmakur, Allagadda, Bethamcherla and Nandikotkur.

Cities and towns in Nandyal district
City / Town	Civic status of city/town	Revenue Division	2011 Census population
Nandyal	Special Grade Municipality	Nandyal	211,424
Dhone	Grade - 2 Municipality	Dhone	59,272
Nandikotkur	Grade - 2 Municipality	Atmakur	46,593
Atmakur	Grade - 3 Municipality	Atmakur	45,703
Allagadda	Grade - 2 Municipality	Nandyal	42,545
Bethamcherla	Nagar Panchayat	Dhone	38,994
Banaganapalle	Major Grama Panchayat	Banaganapalle	36,056
Koilakuntla	Major Grama Panchayat	Banaganapalle	36,105
Srisailam	Grama Panchayat	Atmakur	23,257

== Politics ==
There are one parliamentary and six assembly constituencies in Nandyal district. The parliamentary constituencies are Nandyal. Until 2008 Koilakuntla was Headquarter of Koilakuntla Assembly Constituency after 2009 elections Banaganapalle became new Assembly Constituency in the place of Koilakuntla. The assembly constituencies are given below.

Constituency number	Name	Reserved for (SC/ST/None)	Parliament
134	Allagadda	None	Nandyal
135	Srisailam	None	Nandyal
136	Nandikotkur	SC	Nandyal
139	Nandyal	None	Nandyal
140	Banaganapalle	None	Nandyal
141	Dhone	None	Nandyal
138	Panyam (partially)	None	Nandyal

== Tourism ==
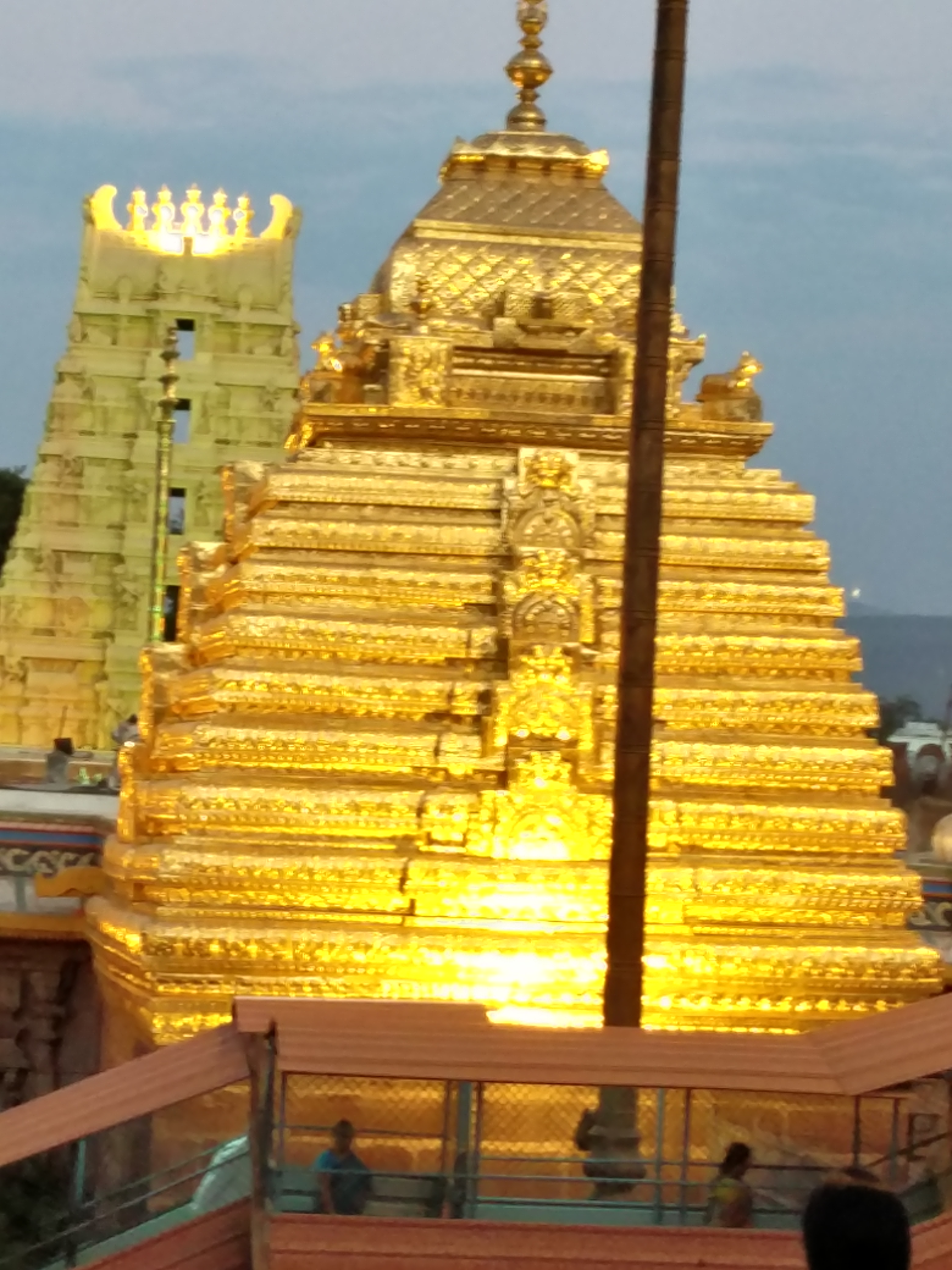
Srisailam

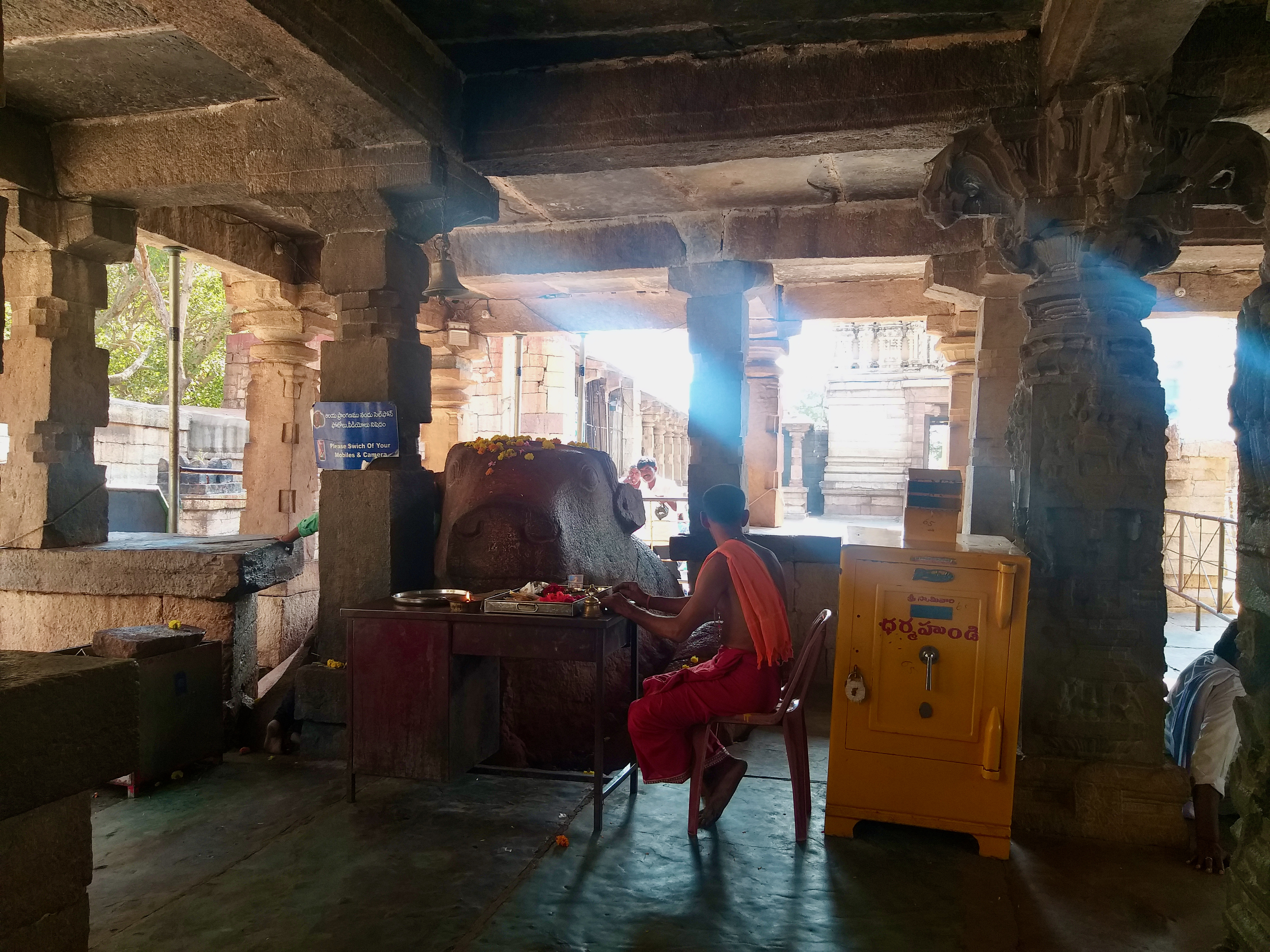
Yaganti Nandi

1) Srisailam is the abode of Brahmaramba Mallikarjuna Swamy. The deity is in natural stone formation in the shape of lingam. It is one of the twelve Jyotirlingams and one of the Shakti Pithas in the country. The temple was built in 14th century.

2) Mahanandiswara temple dates back to the 7th century. Nearby pushkarani is renowned for its crystal clear water.

3) Ahobilam Sri Navanarasimha Swami Temple (Nine Forms of Lord Narasimha) is in upper Ahobilam. The temple of Prahladavarada is in lower Ahobilam. It is one of the 108 Vaishnava Divya deshams in Andhra Pradesh After Tirumala Sri Venkateshwara Swami Temple.

4)Yaganti is the home of Uma Maheswara Swamy. There is a huge Nandi statue with size of 15’ X 10’ X 8’.

5) Nandavaram Sri Chowdeswari devi temple is there in Nandavaram village.

6)Belum caves discovered in 1982 are the second largest natural caves in India after Meghalaya caves. These caves have 3 well like cavities. These are longer than Borra Caves in Vizag district. These have long passages, spacious chambers and fresh water siphons.

7) Rollapadu Wildlife Sanctuary is of interest for bird watchers.

== Notable people ==
1. Potuluri Veerabrahmam Swami was a 16th century saint and guruvu, he had written kalagnanam(future predictions book)at Ravvalakonda near Banaganapalli and he told in his kalagnanam that Yaganti Monolithik Nandi statue is growing day by day and one day it kicks up its leg and do sounds loudly, then kaliyugam will end.
2. Pendekanti Venkatasubbaiah, who served as central minister and governor was born at Sanjamala, He won 6 times as a Member of parliament from Nandyal lok sabha constituency, who had contested for MLA from Koilakuntla Assembly constituency but didn't won, before he become as Member of parliament.
3. Uyyalawada Narasimha Reddy, who fought the British for the first time, was born in Nandyal District Rupanagudi village of Uyyalawada mandal, of Koilakuntla Taluka in 19th century, and he has executed hanging by Britishers at jurreru river near Koilakuntla town.
4. SPY Reddy who contested as an MP and won 3 times, did good to Nandyala.
5. Bhuma Nagireddy garu and Shri Bhuma Shobhanagireddy garu did good to Nandyala and Allagadda.
6. Buggana Rajendranath Reddy garu has won as MLA from Dhone assembly constituency for two times, and worked as Finance minister of Andhra Pradesh, he has done many development works for Bethamcherla mandal of Nandyala district.
7. B.V.Subbareddy who was born at koilakuntla, served First Deputy CM of Andhra Pradesh And Second Speaker of Assembly, He won as MLA from Koilakuntla Assembly constituency many times from Madras presidency time.
8. SriBudda Vengal Reddy who also Known as kaliyuga Dhanakarna won gold medal from Victoria queen.
