= Nandyal Lok Sabha constituency =

Constituency of the Indian parliament in Andhra Pradesh

Coordinates: 15.5°N 78.5°E

Nandyal
- Lok Sabha constituency
- Interactive Map Outlining Nandyal Lok Sabha constituency

Constituency details
- Country: India
- Region: South India
- State: Andhra Pradesh
- Assembly constituencies: Allagadda; Srisailam; Nandikotkur; Panyam; Nandyal; Banaganapalle; Dhone
- Established: 1952
- Total electors: 15,76,945
- Reservation: None

Member of Parliament
- 18th Lok Sabha
- Incumbent Byreddy Shabari
- Party: TDP
- Alliance: NDA
- Elected year: 2024
- Preceded by: P. Brahmananda Reddy

Nandyal Lok Sabha constituency is one of the twenty-five lok sabha constituencies of Andhra Pradesh in India. It comprises seven assembly segments and belongs to Nandyal district.

This seat has been represented in Lok Sabha by Neelam Sanjiva Reddy, just before he became president in 1977, and by P.V. Narasimha Rao, just after he became Prime Minister in 1991.

== Assembly segments ==
Nandyal Lok Sabha constituency presently comprises the following Legislative Assembly segments:

#	Name	District	Member	Party	Leading (in 2024)
134	Allagadda	Nandyal	Bhuma Akhila Priya	TDP	TDP
135	Srisailam	Nandyal	Budda Rajasekhar Reddy	TDP	TDP
136	Nandikotkur(SC)	Nandyal	Githa Jayasurya	TDP	TDP
138	Panyam	Nandyal	Gowru Charitha Reddy	TDP	TDP
139	Nandyal	Nandyal	N. M. D. Farooq	TDP	TDP
140	Banaganapalle	Nandyal	B. C. Janardhan Reddy	TDP	TDP
141	Dhone	Nandyal	Kotla Jayasurya Prakasha Reddy	TDP	TDP

== Members of Parliament ==
Year	Member	Party
1952	Rayasam Seshagiri Rao	Independent
1957	Pendekanti Venkatasubbaiah	Indian National Congress
1962	Pendekanti Venkatasubbaiah	Indian National Congress
1967	Pendekanti Venkatasubbaiah	Indian National Congress
1971	Pendekanti Venkatasubbaiah	Indian National Congress
1977	Neelam Sanjiva Reddy	Bharatiya Lok Dal
1977^	Pendekanti Venkatasubbaiah	Indian National Congress
1980	Pendekanti Venkatasubbaiah	Indian National Congress
1984	Maddur Subba Reddy	Telugu Desam Party
1989	B. Venkata Reddy	Indian National Congress
1991	Gangula Prathapa Reddy	Indian National Congress
1991^	P. V. Narasimha Rao	Indian National Congress
1996	P. V. Narasimha Rao	Indian National Congress
1996^	Bhuma Nagi Reddy	Telugu Desam Party
1998	Bhuma Nagi Reddy	Telugu Desam Party
1999	Bhuma Nagi Reddy	Telugu Desam Party
2004	S. P. Y. Reddy	Indian National Congress
2009	S. P. Y. Reddy	Indian National Congress
2014	S. P. Y. Reddy	YSR Congress Party
2019	P. Bramhananda Reddy	YSR Congress Party
2024	Byreddy Shabari	Telugu Desam Party

== Election results ==
Vote share of Winning candidates
2024	49.92%
2019	55.49%
2014	51.65%
2009	40.21%
2004	55.25%
1999	53.68%
1998	48.47%
1996 by-poll	80.94%
1996	50.42%
1991 by-poll	89.48%
1991	60.10%
1989	53.63%
1984	54.14%
1980	55.78%
1978 by-poll	50.82%
1977	53.19%
1971	66.18%
1967	66.22%
1962	56.88%
1957	70.63%
1952	27.74%

=== 2024 ===
2024 Indian general election: Nandyal
Party	Candidate	Votes	%	±%
TDP	Byreddy Shabari	701,131	49.92	
YSRCP	Pocha Brahmananda Reddy	589,156	41.95	
INC	J. Lakshmi Narasimha Yadav	56,204	4.00	
NOTA	None of the above	10,697	0.76	
IND	18 Independent Candidates	27,932	1.99	
OTH	10 Other Party Candidates	19,298	1.37	
Majority		111,975	7.97	
Turnout		1,410,776	81.82	
Swing to TDP from YSRCP		Swing		

=== 2019 ===
2019 Indian general election: Nandyal
Party	Candidate	Votes	%	±%
YSRCP	Pocha Brahmananda Reddy	720,888	55.49	
TDP	Mandra Sivananda Reddy	470,769	36.24	
JSP	S. P. Y. Reddy	38,871	2.99	
INC	Jangite Lakshmi Narasimha Yadav	14,420	1.11	
NOTA	None of the Above	9,791	0.75	
BJP	Adinarayana Inty	9,066	0.70	
IND	11 Independent Candidates	28,940	2.23	
OTH	4 Other Party Candidates	6,348	0.49	
Majority		250,119	19.25	
Turnout		1,299,785	81.07	
YSRCP hold		Swing		

=== 2014 ===
2014 Indian general election: Nandyal
Party	Candidate	Votes	%	±%
YSRCP	S. P. Y. Reddy	622,411	51.65	
TDP	N. Md. Farooq	516,645	42.88	
INC	B. Y. Ramaiah	16,378	1.36	
BSP	Obulesu Thudum	11,784	0.98	
JSP	Nossam Mallikarjuna Reddy	7,189	0.60	
NOTA	None of the Above	7,115	0.59	
AIMIM	P. V. N. Reddy	5,598	0.46	
AAP	Ullagi David Jaya Kumar	2,499	0.21	
IND	7 Independent Candidates	15,337	1.27	
Majority		105,766	8.77	
Turnout		11,89,659	76.71	
Swing to YSRCP from INC		Swing		

=== 2009 ===
2009 Indian general election: Nandyal
Party	Candidate	Votes	%	±%
INC	S. P. Y. Reddy	400,023	40.21	
TDP	N. Md. Farooq	309,176	31.08	
PRP	Bhuma Nagi Reddy	220,829	22.20	
BSP	S. Mohammed Ismail	7,611	0.77	
IND	13 Independent Candidates	39,682	3.98	
OTH	4 Other Party Candidates	17,505	1.76	
Majority		90,847	9.13	
Turnout		994,826	73.22	
INC hold		Swing		

=== 2004 ===
2004 Indian general election: Nandyal
Party	Candidate	Votes	%	±%
INC	S. P. Y. Reddy	458,526	55.25	
TDP	Shobha Nagi Reddy	346,847	41.79	
IND	Laku Obulesu	7,662	0.92	
BSP	A. C. V. Subbaiah	7,468	0.90	
TRS	S. Vasudev Prasad	2,682	0.32	
IND	4 Independent Candidates	6,791	0.82	
Majority		111,679	13.46	
Turnout		829,976	70.20	
Swing to INC from TDP		Swing		

=== 1999 ===
1999 Indian general election: Nandyal
Party	Candidate	Votes	%	±%
TDP	Bhuma Nagi Reddy	391,655	53.68	
INC	G. Prathap Reddy	319,046	43.73	
NTRTDP(LP)	Telugu Ramanjaneyulu	1,517	0.21	
IND	5 Independent Candidates	17,414	2.39	
Majority		72,609	9.95	
Turnout		749,179	67.10	
TDP hold		Swing		

=== 1998 ===
1998 Indian general election: Nandyal
Party	Candidate	Votes	%	±%
TDP	Bhuma Nagi Reddy	338,100	48.47	
INC	G. Prathap Reddy	333,450	47.80	
BJP	Syed Jaffar Ali Khan	18,841	2.70	
IND	7 Independent Candidates	7,188	1.03	
Majority		4,650	0.67	
Turnout		712,047	64.57	
TDP hold		Swing		

=== 1996 by-election ===
By-election: Nandyal
Party	Candidate	Votes	%	±%
TDP	Bhuma Nagi Reddy	567,042	80.94	
INC	P. V. Rangayya Naidu	126,892	18.11	
IND	R. Bhupal Reddy	1,585	0.23	
IND	Kaka Joginder Singh	1,506	0.21	
BRP	Madagunda Anasuyamma	1,475	0.21	
IND	Mulla Mahaboob Basha	1,100	0.16	
IND	S. Venkatarami Reddy	979	0.14	
Majority		440,150	62.83	
Turnout		700,579	62.36	
Swing to TDP from INC		Swing		

=== 1996 ===
1996 Indian general election: Nandyal
Party	Candidate	Votes	%	±%
INC	P. V. Narasimha Rao	366,431	50.42	
TDP	Bhuma Nagi Reddy	267,901	36.86	
NTRTDP(LP)	Byreddy Seshasayana Reddy	74,078	10.19	
AIIC(T)	N. Venkateswara Naik	459	0.06	
IUML	Alhaj Aftab Ahmed Faizi	278	0.04	
IND	27 Independent Candidates	17,579	2.42	
Majority		98,530	13.56	
Turnout		740,886	65.97	
INC hold		Swing		

=== 1991 by-election ===
Bye-Election 1991: Nandyal
Party	Candidate	Votes	%	±%
INC	P. V. Narasimha Rao	626,241	89.48	
BJP	Bangaru Laxman	45,944	6.56	
IND	M. Subba Reddy	20,398	2.91	
IND	Motkupalli Narasimhulu	2,524	0.36	
IND	R. Krishnamurthy	1,684	0.24	
Majority		5,80,297	82.92	
Turnout		6,99,846	69.66	
INC hold		Swing		

=== 1991 ===
1991 Indian general election: Nandyal
Party	Candidate	Votes	%	±%
INC	G. Prathap Reddy	377,556	60.10	
TDP	Challa Rama Krishna Reddy	190,790	30.37	
BJP	S. P. Y. Reddy	47,412	7.55	
JP	Nallagatla Narasimhulu	3,228	0.51	
IND	10 Independent Candidates	9,200	1.47	
Majority		186,766	29.73	
Turnout		653,567	65.06	
INC hold		Swing		

=== 1989 ===
1989 Indian general election: Nandyal
Party	Candidate	Votes	%	±%
INC	Bojja Venkata Reddy	370,097	53.63	
TDP	Madduru Subba Reddy	313,835	45.48	
IND	Magham Gangadharam Setty	3,321	0.48	
JP	Seella Sanjeevareddy	2,850	0.41	
Majority		56,262	8.15	
Turnout		711,179	71.03	
Swing to INC from TDP		Swing		

=== 1984 ===
1984 Indian general election: Nandyal
Party	Candidate	Votes	%	±%
TDP	Maddur Subba Reddy	298,420	54.14	
INC	Pendekanti Venkata Subbaiah	248,157	45.02	
IND	R. Ramachandra Reddy	2,568	0.47	
IND	Peerige Nadipi Sunkanna	1,147	0.21	
IND	Valluri Ganamma	929	0.17	
Majority		50,263	9.12	
Turnout		562,293	70.47	
Swing to TDP from INC(I)		Swing		

=== 1980 ===
1980 Indian general election: Nandyal
Party	Candidate	Votes	%	±%
INC(I)	P. Venkata Subbaiah	219,606	55.78	
INC(U)	Asif Pasha	141,228	35.87	
IND	Pentrala Subba Rao	13,424	3.41	
IND	N. Venkata Subbaiah	8,677	2.20	
IND	S. Pedda Sankara Reddy	8,675	2.20	
IND	A. Sultan Mohiddin	2,060	0.52	
Majority		78,378	19.91	
Turnout		405,934	55.04	
INC(I) hold		Swing		

=== 1978 by-election ===
By-election: Nandyal
Party	Candidate	Votes	%	±%
INC(I)	P. V. Subbaiah	257,795	50.82	
JP	Gamago	216,792	42.74	
IND	B. Guruvaiah	32,660	6.44	
Majority		41,003	8.08	
Turnout				
Swing to INC(I) from JP		Swing		

=== 1977 ===
1977 Indian general election: Nandyal
Party	Candidate	Votes	%	±%
JP	Neelam Sanjeeva Reddy	258,147	53.19	
INC	Pendakanti Venkata Subbaiah	222,404	45.83	
IND	Lakka Devanandam	4,774	0.98	
Majority		35,743	7.36	
Turnout		496,200	73.47	
Swing to JP from INC		Swing		

=== 1971 ===
1971 Indian general election: Nandyal
Party	Candidate	Votes	%	±%
INC	Rendekanti Venkata Subbaiah	225,740	66.18	
INC(O)	Kanala Anki Reddy	95,284	27.94	
IND	Sabbasani Malla Reddy	15,337	4.50	
IND	Bontha Pulla Reddy	4,716	1.38	
Majority		130,456	38.24	
Turnout		348,303	59.05	
INC hold		Swing		

=== 1967 ===
1967 Indian general election: Nandyal
Party	Candidate	Votes	%	±%
INC	P. V. Subbaiah	262,256	66.22	
CPI	S. Reddy	93,431	23.59	
SWA	Y. Yalluri	40,347	10.19	
Majority		168,825	42.63	
Turnout		409,857	76.35	
INC hold		Swing		

=== 1962 ===
1962 Indian general election: Adoni
Party	Candidate	Votes	%	±%
INC	Pendekanti Venkata Subbaiah	136,513	56.88	
SWA	Nayakanti Sankara Reddy	103,491	43.12	
Majority		33,022	13.76	
Turnout		252,379	60.22	
INC hold		Swing		

=== 1957 ===
1957 Indian general election: Adoni
Party	Candidate	Votes	%	±%
INC	Pendekanti Venkata Subbaiah	83,295	70.63	
PSP	Gadilinganna Gowd	34,642	29.37	
Majority		48,653	41.26	
Turnout		117,937	30.00	
Swing to INC from Independent		Swing		

=== 1952 ===
1952 Indian general election: Nandyal
Party	Candidate	Votes	%	±%
IND	Seshagiri Rao	67,905	27.74	
INC	Sura Rami Reddy	61,301	25.04	
IND	M. K. V. Reddy	58,121	23.75	
KLP	Chegireddy Bali Reddy	38,192	15.60	
KMPP	S. Nagappa	19,246	7.86	
Majority		6,604	2.70	
Turnout		244,765	64.39	
Independent win (new seat)				

== See also ==
- List of constituencies of the Andhra Pradesh Legislative Assembly

Lok Sabha
Preceded by Ballia	Constituency represented by the prime minister 1991-1996	Succeeded by Lucknow
