= Maddur Subba Reddy =

Indian politician

Member of Parliament, Lok Sabha
- In office 1984-1989
- Preceded by: Pendekanti Venkatasubbaiah
- Succeeded by: Bojja Venkata Reddy
- Constituency: Nandyal

Personal details
- Born: 4 December 1914 Brahmana Kotukur Village, Nandi Kotukur Taluk, Kurnool district, Madras Presidency, British India (present-day Andhra Pradesh, India)
- Party: Telugu Desam Party
- Spouse: M. Nagamma
- Source: ["8th Lok Sabha Members Bioprofile: Reddy, Shri M. Subba". Archived from the original on 25 March 2023.]

Maddur Subba Reddy was an Indian politician. He was a Member of Parliament, representing Nandyal in the Lok Sabha, the lower house of India's Parliament, as a member of the Telugu Desam Party.
