= Erasu Prathap Reddy =

Indian politician (born 1952)

Erasu Prathap Reddy (born 15 November 1952) is an Indian politician from Andhra Pradesh. He is a member of the Andhra Pradesh Legislative Assembly from the Srisailam Assembly constituency in Kurnool district representing the Indian National Congress party.

== Early life ==
Reddy is from Srisailam, Kurnool district, Andhra Pradesh. He is the son of the late Ayyapu Reddy, a former minister and MLA from Panyam Assembly constituency. He completed his BL at Law College, Osmania University in 1974 after finishing his BSc at New Science College in Hyderabad in 1971. He declared assets worth Rs.2 crore in 2009 and Rs.9 crore in 20114, in his affidavits to the Election Commission of India.

== Career ==
Reddy won the Srisailam Assembly constituency in the 2009 Andhra Pradesh Legislative Assembly election representing the Indian National Congress. He polled 49,384 votes and defeated his nearest rival, Budda Rajasekhara Reddy of the Telugu Desam Party, by 4,307 votes. He shifted to the Telugu Desam Party and contested the 2014 Andhra Pradesh Legislative Assembly election on TDP ticket but could only finish third behind winner, Gowru Charitha Reddy of the YSR Congress Party and Katasani Rambhupal Reddy, who contested as an independent candidate and finished second.
