= Gangula =

Gangula (Telugu: గంగుల) is a Telugu surname. Notable people with the surname include:

- Gangula Brijendra Reddy (born 1968), Indian politician
- Gangula Kamalakar (born 1988), Indian politician
- Gangula Prathapa Reddy (born 1950), Indian politician
