= Govindapalle =

- Village
- Nickname: Gonpalle
- Location in Andhra Pradesh, India Govindapalle (India)
- Coordinates: 15.3532°N 78.5216°E
- Country: India
- State: Andhra Pradesh
- District: Nandyal
- Named for: Cultivation

Government
  - Type: Major Gram Panchyati
  - MP: Byreddy Shabari
  - MLA: Bhuma Akhila Priya
  - Sarpanch: N.Mariyamma
  - Vice Sarpanch: I.Naga Sesha Reddy
- Elevation: 238 m (781 ft)

Population
  - Total: 10,000

Languages
  - Official: Telugu
- Time zone: UTC+5:30 (IST)
- Postal code: 518563
- Vehicle registration: AP 21&39

Govindapalle is a village in Sirvella Mandal of Nandyal district of Andhra Pradesh, India.

== Geography ==
Sirivella is at 15.3532°N 78.5216°E. It has an average elevation of 238 m (781 ft). Its PIN number is 518502.

== History ==
Govindpalle is a village in Sirivel Mandal in Nandyal District of Andhra Pradesh State, India. It belongs to the Rayalaseema region. It is located 20 km east of the district headquarters Nandyal, 4 km from Sirivel, and 263 km from the state capital Amaravati

== Census details ==
The local language is Telugu. As of the 2011 Indian census, Govindpalle's total population is 7250, the number of houses are 1815 and the female population is 50.3%. The village's literacy rate is 57.0% and the female literacy rate is 23.3%.
