= Bhuma Nagi Reddy =

Indian politician

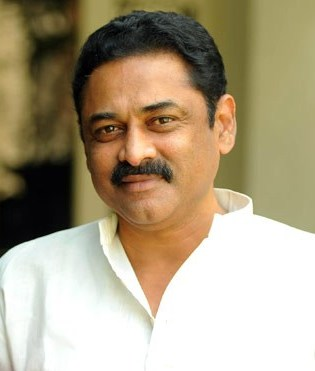
- Nagi Reddy in 2012

Member of Parliament, Lok Sabha
- In office 10 May 1996 – 14 May 2004
- Preceded by: P. V. Narasimha Rao
- Succeeded by: S. P. Y. Reddy
- Constituency: Nandyal

Member of Legislative Assembly, Andhra Pradesh
- In office 16 May 2014 – 12 March 2017
- Preceded by: Silpa Mohan Reddy
- Succeeded by: Bhuma Brahmananda Reddy
- Constituency: Nandyal
- In office 1994–1996
- Preceded by: Bhuma Sekhara Reddy
- Succeeded by: Bhuma Shobha Nagi Reddy
- Constituency: Allagadda

Personal details
- Born: January 8, 1964 Kothapalle, Nandyal district, Andhra Pradesh
- Died: March 12, 2017 (aged 53) Allagadda
- Party: Telugu Desam Party (until 2009; 2016–2017)
- Other political affiliations: Praja Rajyam Party (2009–2010); YSR Congress Party(2011–2016)
- Spouse(s): Bhuma Shobha Nagi Reddy (m.1986-2014)
- Relations: Bhuma Akhila Priya (daughter); Bhuma Naga Mounika (daughter); Bhuma Jagat Vikhyat Reddy (son); Manchu Manoj (son-in-law); Bhuma Brahmananda Reddy (Nephew)
- Occupation: Indian politician

Bhuma Nagi Reddy (8 January 1964–12 March 2017) was an Indian politician. He was elected in a by-election to the Andhra Pradesh Legislative Assembly in 1992 after the sudden death of his brother, Bhuma Sekhar Reddy, an MLA from Allagadda constituency in Kurnool district. In 1996, Reddy was the Telugu Desam Party candidate against Prime Minister P. V. Narasimha Rao in the Nandyal Lok Sabha constituency election. He served in the 11th, 12th and 13th Lok Sabhas. Reddy died in office on 12 March 2017 after a massive heart attack at his home in Allagadda.

== Personal life ==
Nagi Reddy was born in the remote village of Kothapalle, near Dornipadu, the youngest son of Bhuma Bali Reddy and Eeswaramma. He had three older brothers and one younger sister, Bogolu Sri Devi. As the family had been involved in local politics, Bali Reddy wanted to send his son away for his education. Nagi Reddy completed his intermediate studies in Velankanni at a private school affiliated with the Central Board of Secondary Education. He was later sent to Bangalore to study medicine, but had to return after his father was murdered. His father's death inspired Nagi Reddy to become a politician in the Rayalaseema region.

He married Shobha Nagi Reddy, daughter of former Andhra Pradesh minister S. V. Subbareddy, who also became a renowned politician. She died on 24 April 2014 at 11:05 pm after an automobile accident while she was campaigning for the 2014 legislative elections. They had three children: one son and two daughters, one of whom is Allagada MLA Akhila Priya Reddy.

== Politics ==
Nagi Reddy began his political career in 1984, when he was elected president of the Rudravaram Cooperative Society. From 1986 to 1990, he was a mandal president in Allagadda MPP. Nagi Reddy stood as an MLA candidate for the opposition Telugu Desam Party in the 1991 by-election for the Allagadda constituency left vacant by the death of his brother Bhuma Sekhar Reddy, who died of a heart attack on 7 June. In 1996, he challenged Prime Minister P. V. Narasimha Rao for the TDP. Although Nagi Reddy was narrowly defeated, he gained many supporters and considerable publicity. Narasimha Rao resigned the Nandyal seat to retain the Berhampur constituency, leading to a by-election. Nagi Reddy defeated Rangaiah Naidu to join the 11th Lok Sabha.

In 1998, he narrowly defeated Gangula Prathapa Reddy. The result inspired Nagi Reddy to rebuild his political strategy and improve his relationship with the party core. In the 1999 midterm election, he defeated Prathapa Reddy by 72,600 votes.

In 2004, Nagi Reddy was defeated by Prathap Reddy in the Allagadda assembly constituency. His wife, a two-term MLA from Allagadda, reluctantly stood as an MP candidate from Nandyal and lost to Congress candidate S. P. Y. Reddy. After the Praja Rajyam Party was founded by Tollywood film actor Chiranjeevi, the couple resigned from the TDP on 4 July 2008 and joined the new party on 20 August. In the 2009 general elections, Nagi Reddy was defeated in the Nandyal parliamentary constituency on the PRP ticket; Shobha Nagi Reddy was elected from the Allagadda assembly constituency.

In 2010, after Kadapa MP Y. S. Jaganmohan Reddy (son of the unexpectedly deceased chief minister of Andhra Pradesh Y. S. Rajasekhara Reddy) founded the YSR Congress Party, Chiranjeevi decided to merge the PRP with the Indian National Congress. Nagi Reddy and his wife opposed the move, joined Jaganmohan Reddy and became key figures in the YSR Congress Party. Nagi Reddy and his daughter, Bhuma Akhila Priya (the Allagadda MLA) returned to the TDP in 2016. He was recognized for his role in the construction of a rail line from Yerraguntla to Nandyal.

== Electoral History ==
=== Lok Sabha ===
Year	Constituency	Party	Votes	%	Opponent	Party	Votes	%	Result	Margin	%
1996	Nandyal	TDP	267,901	36.86	P.V. Narasimha Rao	INC	366,431	50.42	Lost	−98,530	−13.56
1998	Nandyal	TDP	338,100	48.47	Gangula Prathapa Reddy	INC	333,450	47.80	Won	+4,650	+0.67
1999	Nandyal	TDP	391,655	53.68	Gangula Prathapa Reddy	INC	319,046	43.73	Won	+72,609	+9.95
2009	Nandyal	PRP	220,829	22.20	S.P.Y. Reddy	INC	400,023	40.21	Lost	−179,194	−18.01

== Rayala Telangana ==
Nagi Reddy said in January 2007 that Rayalaseema should become part of Telangana and not be divided with Andhra Pradesh because the region's people were culturally and emotionally closer to Telangana. Unlike coastal Andhra Pradesh, Rayalaseema has a history of droughts and poverty. According to Nagi Reddy, 90 percent of coastal Andhra Pradesh's arable land was being irrigated, compared with 45 percent in the rest of the region.

== Committees ==
Nagi Reddy was a member of the finance and external affairs committees in 1996–1997. He was a member of the transport and tourism committee, the committee to provide computers to MPs, and a consultative committee for the Ministry of Chemicals and Fertilizers in 1998–1999. Nagi Reddy was a member of the energy committee in 1999 and 2000 and of a consultative committee for the Ministry of Urban Development from 2000 to 2004.

== Death ==
Nagi Reddy died of a massive heart attack at his home on 12 March 2017 at age 53. He was survived by his three children.
