= Rayasam =

Rayasam (Telugu: రాయసం) is a Telugu surname. Notable people with the surname include:

- Beechi, born as Rayasam Bheemasena Rao (1913–1980), humorist in the Kannada language
- Rayasam Seshagiri Rao (1909–1963), member of the 1st Lok Sabha of India
