= Chagalamarri =

- town
- Location in Andhra Pradesh, India Chagalamarri (India)
- Coordinates: 14.9667°N 78.5833°E
- Country: India
- State: Andhra Pradesh
- District: Nandyal

Government
  - Type: TDP [ BHUMA ]
- Elevation: 149 m (489 ft)

Population (2001)
  - Total: 21,289

Languages
  - Official: Telugu
- Time zone: UTC+5:30 (IST)
- PIN: 518553
- Telephone code: 08519
- Vehicle registration: AP 39

Chagalamarri is a town and capital of Chagalamarri mandal in the Nandyal district of Andhra Pradesh, India. It sits under the Allagadda constituency for state assembly elections and under the Nandyal constituency for parliament elections. The town is almost the halfway point between Hyderabad and Bangalore and is located at the border of the Kurnool and Kadapa districts. Farming largely centers on paddy and flowers; its main water irrigation sources are the Vakkileru River and Kadapa-Kurnool canal.

Points of interest include the Jama, Noorani, and Khilla mosques; Ayyappa and Ammavarishala Ramalayam temples; and the Mary Mata church.
