= Vasavi College of Engineering =

Technical institution in Ibrahimbagh, Hyderabad, India

- Type: Education and research institution
- Established: 1981
- Founder: Pendekanti Venkatasubbaiah
- President: Ramamohan Rao Pendekanti
- Location: Hyderabad, Telangana, India
- Campus: Urban, 13.6 acres (55,000 m^{2}) of land
- Website: http://www.vce.ac.in

Vasavi College of Engineering (Autonomous) (VCE) is a self-financed technical institution located in Ibrahimbagh, Hyderabad, India. It is 12 kms from the city center. The institution is affiliated to Osmania University, Hyderabad. Founded in 1981 by the Vasavi Academy of Education, it is accredited by the National Board of Accreditation. The college was founded by Pendekanti Venkatasubbaiah, a statesman of independent India.

University Grants Commission and Osmania University, Hyderabad conferred autonomous status for the college with effect from 2014-15 academic year.

== General ==
With the historic Golconda Fort and Taramati Baradari close by, the college covers over 13.6-acre (55,000 m^{2}). VCE is the home for 170 faculty, 2300 students, and 100 administrative and supporting staff. The college has ten academic departments in engineering and science disciplines.

The entrance to VCE lies on the Mehdipatnam - Gandipet Road and is flanked by the Golconda Fort and Taramati Baradari. The campus, located 29 km from Shamshabad Airport, 27 km from Secunderabad railway station and 13 km from Nampally railway station, is well connected by buses.

The college provides transport facility to its students with College Private Buses .

== Departments ==
- Civil Engineering
- Computer Science and Engineering
- Electronics and Communication Engineering
- Electrical and Electronics Engineering
- Information Technology
- Mechanical Engineering
- Computer Applications
- Chemistry
- Mathematics
- Physics
- Humanities and Social Sciences

The college offers undergraduate and postgraduate degrees in seven disciplines of engineering. Over 150 faculty members belonging to the engineering departments are engaged in teaching, research and industrial consultancy.

The academic calendar is organized on semester programs. English is the medium of instruction. The students are evaluated on a continuous basis throughout the semester in the form of tests(often referred to as Internals), class assignments and/or projects. The students are subject to a final exam conducted by Osmania University, with which lies the responsibility of the final evaluation. The final examination is usually referred to as Externals. The degrees are awarded by the university itself.

=== Undergraduate academics ===
The four-year undergraduate program is offered for the six engineering disciplines of:

- Civil Engineering
- Computer Science and Engineering
- Computer Science & Engineering (Artificial Intelligence & Machine Learning)
- Electrical and Electronics Engineering
- Electronics and Communication Engineering
- Information Technology
- Mechanical Engineering

The students are subject to the evaluation process during their four-year program. The Internals constitute the tests and assignments that are conducted every semester. This is the usual academic activity during the semesters. The senior year students complete a research thesis under the guidance of the college faculty.

==== Intake ====
The requirement for admission to the undergraduate program is to appear for the Engineering, Agricultural and Medical Common Entrance Test, referred to as EAMCET for intermediate students. This test, which is conducted every year, is competitive with over 300,000 writing the test each year. The candidates are also required to pass the examination of the Board of Intermediate Education, Government of Telangana with Mathematics, Physics and Chemistry as optional subjects, or any other examination recognized by the Osmania University as equivalent. As of 2021, 780 students are admitted into the undergraduate program every year.

Branch	Intake
Information Technology	180
Computer Science and Engineering	120
Electronics and Communication Engineering	180
Civil Engineering	60
Electrical and Electronics Engineering	60
Mechanical Engineering	60
Computer Science & Engineering (Artificial Intelligence & Machine Learning)	60

Telangana State Engineering Common Entrance Test referred as TSECET for Diploma and Bsc mathematics students.

=== Graduate academics ===
A three-year graduate program in the form of a Master's degree in Computer Applications (MCA) is offered by the college. Alongside this program, there is a two-year graduate program that offers a Masters in Engineering (M. E.) in four disciplines:

- Embedded Systems and VLSI Design
- Advanced Design and Manufacturing
- Communication Engineering & Signal Processing
- Power Systems & Power Electronics

& Masters in Technology (M. Tech) in one discipline:

- Computer Science & Engineering

The admissions for the ME programs is through the Graduate Aptitude Test in Engineering (GATE).

== Other academic activities ==
The Department of Civil Engineering has signed a Memorandum of Understanding with SatNav (Satyam Navigation), a GIS company promoted by Satyam Computer Services Limited.

The college offers a Java EE program as a value-added course. Another MoU was signed between Vasavi College of Engineering and Pramati Technologies in 2002. The J2EE Program at Vasavi College of Engineering started with the assistance of Pramati Technologies through the Education and Training Partnership initiative. Since then 200 students have been trained in Java technologies.

== Rankings ==
University rankings

Engineering – India
- NIRF (2024): 201-300

The National Institutional Ranking Framework (NIRF) ranked the university between 201-300 in the engineering rankings in 2024.
