= Nandyal Assembly constituency =

Constituency of the Andhra Pradesh Legislative Assembly, India

Coordinates: 15.48°N 78.48°E

Nandyal
- Constituency No. 139 for the Andhra Pradesh Legislative Assembly
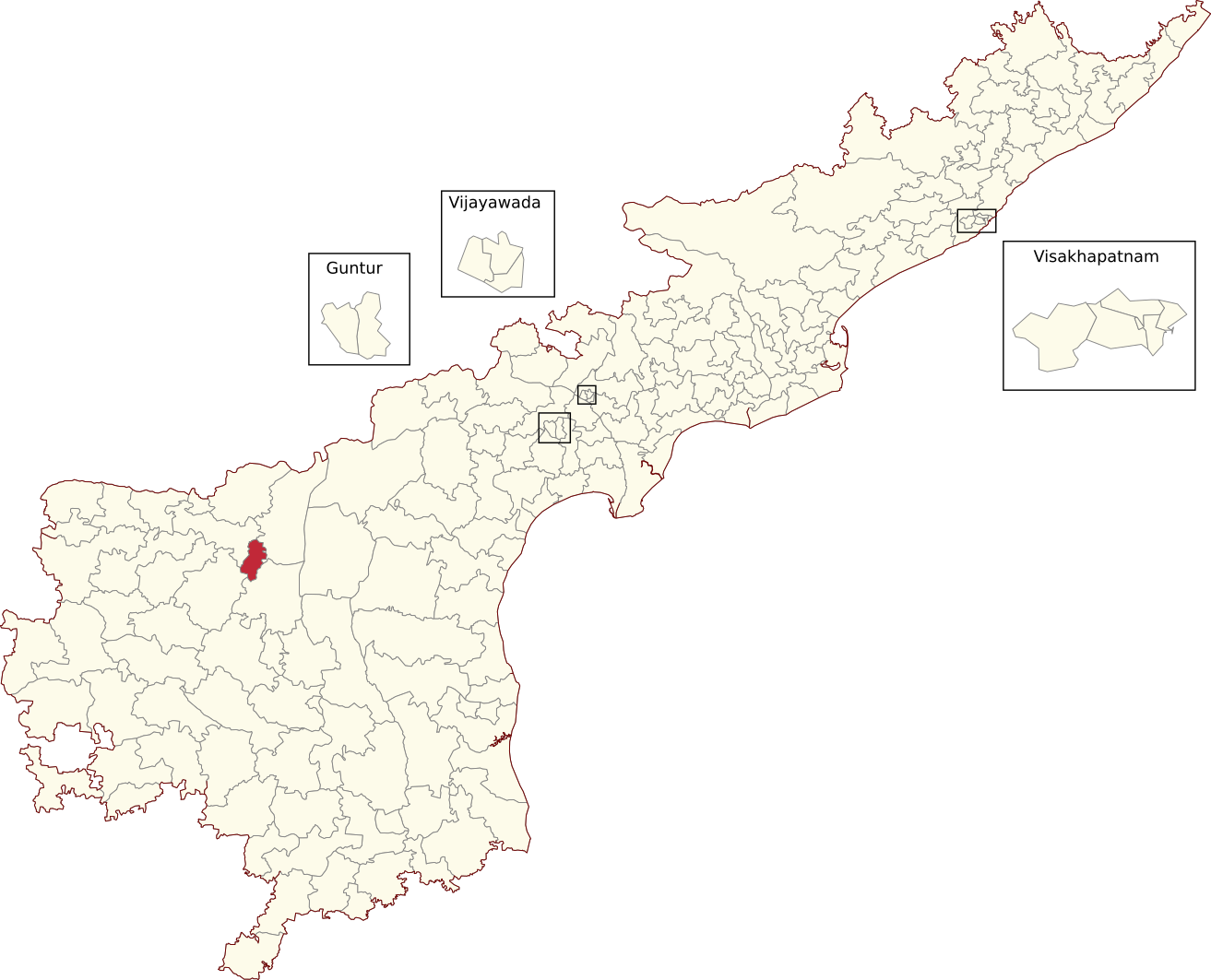
- Location of Nandyal Assembly constituency within Andhra Pradesh

Constituency details
- Country: India
- Region: South India
- State: Andhra Pradesh
- District: Nandyal
- Lok Sabha constituency: Nandyal
- Established: 1951
- Total electors: 256,573
- Reservation: None

Member of Legislative Assembly
- 16th Andhra Pradesh Legislative Assembly
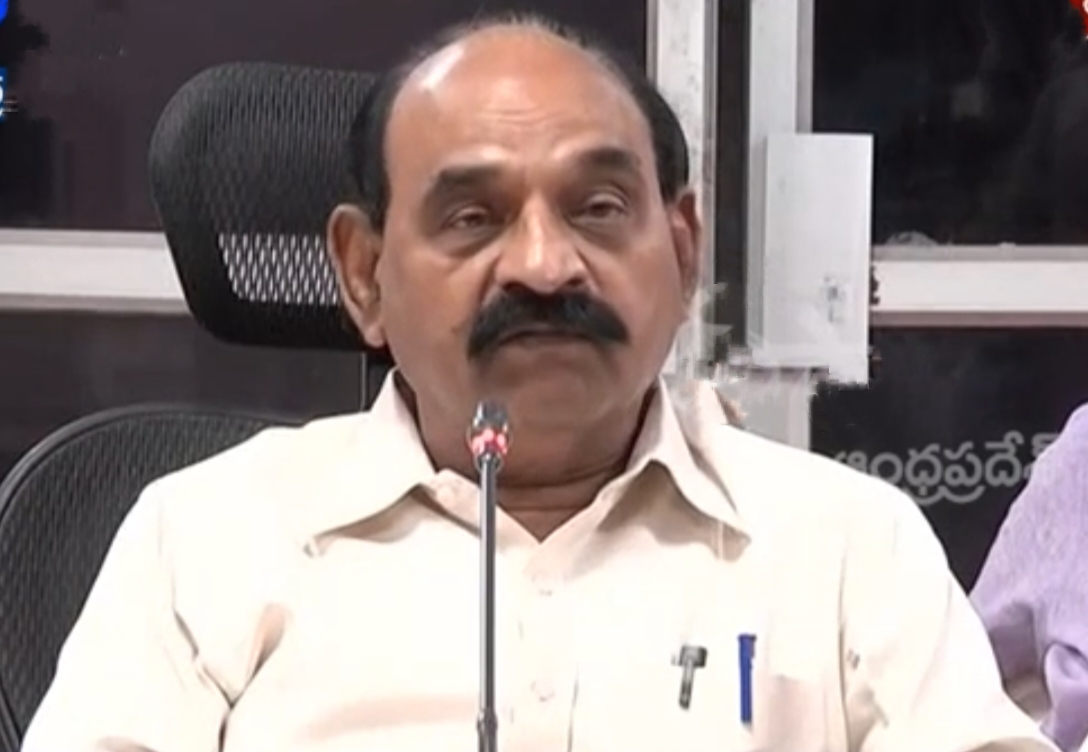
- Incumbent N. Md. Farooq
- Party: TDP
- Alliance: NDA
- Elected year: 2024

Nandyal Assembly constituency is a constituency in Nandyal district of Andhra Pradesh that elects representatives to the Andhra Pradesh Legislative Assembly in India. It is one of the seven assembly segments of Nandyal Lok Sabha constituency.

N. M. D. Farooq is the MLA of the constituency, having won the 2024 Andhra Pradesh Legislative Assembly election from Telugu Desam Party. As of 2019, there are a total of 256,573 electors in the constituency. The constituency was established in 1951, as per the Delimitation Orders (1951).

== Mandals ==
Mandal
Nandyal Urban
Nandyal Rural(new)
Gospadu

== Members of the Legislative Assembly ==
Year	Member	Political party
1952	Mallu Subba Reddy	Independent
1955	Gopavaram Rami Reddy	Independent
1959^	G. V. Reddy	Indian National Congress
1962	Mallu Subba Reddy	Independent
1967	S. B. N. Saheb	Indian National Congress
1972	Bojja Venkata Reddy	Independent
1978	Bojja Venkata Reddy	Janata Party
1983	M. Sanjeeva Reddy	Telugu Desam Party
1985	N. M. D. Farooq	Telugu Desam Party
1989	V. Ramanath Reddy	Indian National Congress
1994	N. M. D. Farooq	Telugu Desam Party
1999	N. M. D. Farooq	Telugu Desam Party
2004	Silpa Mohan Reddy	Indian National Congress
2009	Silpa Mohan Reddy	Indian National Congress
2014	Bhuma Nagi Reddy	YSR Congress Party
2017^	Bhuma Brahmananda Reddy	Telugu Desam Party
2019	S. Ravichandra Kishore Reddy	YSR Congress Party
2024	N. M. D. Farooq	Telugu Desam Party

== Election results ==
=== 1952 ===
1952 Madras Legislative Assembly election: Nandyal
Party	Candidate	Votes	%	±%
Independent	Maller Subba Reddy	22,704	43.47	
INC	G. Rami Reddy	20,196	38.67	38.67
Independent	Bandaru Naganna	3,212	6.15	
Independent	Abdul Suttar Sayed	2,879	5.51	
IUML	Syed Fida Hussain	2,623	5.02	
Independent	S. Subbaroy	619	1.19	
Margin of victory		2,508	4.80	
Turnout		52,233	69.02	
Registered electors		75,680		
Independent win (new seat)				

=== 1959 by-election ===
1959 Andhra Pradesh Legislative Assembly by-election: Nandyal
Party	Candidate	Votes	%	±%
INC	G.V. Reddy	12,819		
Independent	P.M. Reddy	9,227		
Margin of victory		3,592		
Turnout				
INC hold		Swing		

=== 2004 ===
2004 Andhra Pradesh Legislative Assembly election: Nandyal
Party	Candidate	Votes	%	±%
INC	Silpa Mohan Reddy	89,612	66.21	+42.71
TDP	Nasyam Mohammed Farooq	40,935	30.24	−9.32
Majority		48,677	35.97	
Turnout		135,348	64.97	+4.22
INC gain from TDP		Swing		

=== 2009 ===
2009 Andhra Pradesh Legislative Assembly election: Nandyal
Party	Candidate	Votes	%	±%
INC	Silpa Mohan Reddy	67,430	46.31	−19.90
PRP	Atla Venkata Subba Reddy	35,541	24.41	
TDP	N.H.Bhaskar Reddy	34,979	24.02	−6.22
Majority		31,889	21.90	
Turnout		145,616	69.88	+4.91
INC hold		Swing		

=== 2014 ===
2014 Andhra Pradesh Legislative Assembly election: Nandyal
Party	Candidate	Votes	%	±%
YSRCP	Bhuma Nagi Reddy	82,194	46.97	
TDP	Silpa Mohan Reddy	78,590	44.91	
SDPI	D. S. Habibulla	6,091	3.48	
INC	Jupalle Rakesh Reddy	2,459	1.41	
BSP	Perepogu Vijaya Kumar	1,493	0.85	
NOTA	None of the Above	690	0.39	
Majority		3,604	2.06	
Turnout		1,74,999	72.08	
YSRCP gain from INC		Swing		

=== 2017 by-election ===
2017 Andhra Pradesh Legislative Assembly by-election: Nandyal
Party	Candidate	Votes	%	±%
TDP	Bhuma Bramhananda Reddy	97,000	56.05	
YSRCP	Silpa Mohan Reddy	69,610	40.19	
NOTA	None of the Above	1,231	0.71	
Majority		27,465	15.86	
Turnout		1,73,187	79.04	
TDP gain from YSRCP		Swing		

=== 2019 ===
2019 Andhra Pradesh Legislative Assembly election: Nandyal
Party	Candidate	Votes	%	±%
YSRCP	S. Ravichandra Kishore Reddy	108,868	55.13	+14.94
TDP	Bhuma Bramhananda Reddy	74,308	37.63	
Majority		34,560	17.50	
Turnout		1,97,490		
YSRCP gain from TDP		Swing		

=== 2024 ===
2024 Andhra Pradesh Legislative Assembly election: Nandyal
Party	Candidate	Votes	%	±%
TDP	Nasyam Mohammed Farooq	103,075	49.42	
YSRCP	S. Ravichandra Kishore Reddy	90,742	43.51	
INC	Gopavaram Gokul Krishna Reddy	6,418	3.08	
NOTA	None Of The Above	1,518	0.73	
Majority		12,333	5.91	
Turnout		2,08,578		
TDP gain from YSRCP		Swing		

== See also ==
- List of constituencies of Andhra Pradesh Legislative Assembly
