= Bhuma Shobha Nagi Reddy =

Indian politician (1968–2014)

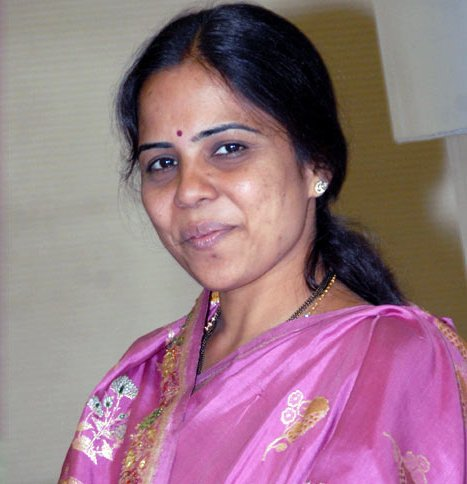

Member of Legislative Assembly Andhra Pradesh
- In office 2009–2014
- Preceded by: Gangula Prathapa Reddy
- Succeeded by: Bhuma Akhila Priya
- Constituency: Allagadda
- In office 1996–2004
- Preceded by: Bhuma Nagi Reddy
- Succeeded by: Gangula Prathapa Reddy
- Constituency: Allagadda

Personal details
- Born: 16 November 1968 Allagadda, Andhra Pradesh, India
- Died: 24 April 2014 (aged 45) Hyderabad, Andhra Pradesh, India
- Party: YSR Congress Party (2012-2014)
- Other political affiliations: Praja Rajyam Party (2009-2012); Telugu Desam Party (1996-2009)
- Spouse: Bhuma Nagi Reddy
- Children: 3

Bhuma Shobha Nagi Reddy (16 December 1968 – 24 April 2014) was an Indian politician from Andhra Pradesh, India. She represented the Allagadda constituency in the Legislative Assembly of Andhra Pradesh for four terms until 2012 when she resigned due to political turmoil in her party. She served as the chairperson of Andhra Pradesh State Road Transport Corporation (APSRTC) and was the spokesperson for Prajarajyam party, having previously been General Secretary and also a state committee member in Telugu Desam Party. In 2012, she left the Prajarajyam party and joined the newly formed YSR Congress. Her husband Bhuma Nagi Reddy was also a politician who served twice as a Member of Legislative Assembly and thrice as a Member of Parliament.

== Early life ==
Shobha Nagireddy was the younger daughter of S. V. Subba Reddy, and sister of Nagarathamma, a politician and former minister from Andhra Pradesh. She was born and brought up in Allagadda, Kurnool, Andhra Pradesh where she studied up to Intermediate. Her elder brother, S.V. Mohan Reddy, is also a politician and has brother in law- Ramachandra Reddy.

== Political career ==
Shobha Nagireddy first became actively engaged in politics in 1996, prior to which she was a housewife. Her husband, Bhuma Nagireddy, was elected as a Member of Parliament and so had to resign from his post as a Member of the Andhra Pradesh Legislative Assembly from the Allagadda constituency. Fighting as a candidate of Telugu Desam Party, she was elected to the vacant Assembly seat. She was elected four times consecutively to the state Assembly. She is the only woman in AP to have been legislator, along with her father, for two consecutive terms.

In 2004, she contested Nandyal Lok Sabha seat and was unsuccessful. In 2008, she and her husband joined the newly formed Prajarajyam party.

In 2011, after PRP merged with INC, Shobha joined the YSR Congress party.

Shobha Nagireddy won Allagadda state assembly constituency posthumously which she has contested as YSR congress candidate in the 2014 state election conducted on May 7 of that year just days after her sudden death, by-election date would be announced soon. Allagadda Assembly constituency could be Seema Andhra's first election mandate post bifurcation of Andhra Pradesh Legislative Assembly.

== Personal life ==
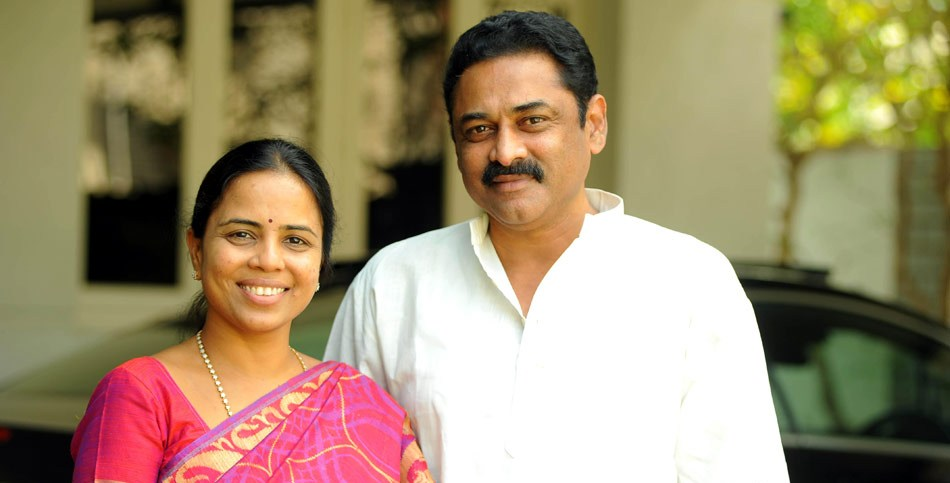
Shobha Nagi Reddy with her husband Bhuma Nagi Reddy

Shobha married Bhuma Nagireddy in 1986 and the couple has three children: 2 daughters including Bhuma Akhila Priya and a son.

== Death ==
In the late hours of 23 April 2014, the SUV (Mitsubishi Outlander) in which Shobha was travelling overturned near Gubagundam Metta. She was returning after campaigning for the upcoming 2014 assembly elections. Hours later, she died undergoing treatment in Care hospital in Hyderabad. She was 45 years old. Her husband, who became severely depressed after her death and change of party, died on 12 March 2017. They are survived by their three children.
