= Bhuma Brahmananda Reddy =

Indian politician

Member of Legislative Assembly Andhra Pradesh
- In office 2017–2019
- Preceded by: Bhuma Nagi Reddy
- Succeeded by: Silpa Ravi Chandra Kishore Reddy
- Constituency: Nandyal

Personal details
- Born: Nandyal, India
- Party: Telugu Desam Party
- Spouse: Prathiba
- Parent: Late Bhuma Veerashekar Reddy (father)
- Relatives: Bhuma Nagi Reddy (uncle); Bhuma Akhila Priya (cousin)
- Occupation: Politician

Bhuma Brahmananda Reddy is an Indian politician from Andhra Pradesh. He was an MLA of the Telugu Desam Party from the Nandyal Assembly constituency in Kurnool district. He won the 2017 bypoll by a margin of 27,466 votes.

== Career ==
Bhuma Brahmananda Reddy joined the Telugu Desam Party (TDP) along with his uncle, Bhuma Nagi Reddy, in the presence of Andhra Pradesh Chief Minister N. Chandrababu Naidu on 22 February 2016. He contested the Nandyal Assembly constituency bypoll as the TDP candidate and won with a majority of 27,466 votes against YSR Congress party candidate Silpa Mohan Reddy. He took oath as MLA on 6 October 2017.

In the 2019 Andhra Pradesh Legislative Assembly election, Bhuma Brahmananda Reddy lost to Silpa Ravi Chandra Kishore Reddy of the YSR Congress party by a margin of 34,560.
