= Panyam Assembly constituency =

Constituency of the Andhra Pradesh Legislative Assembly, India

Coordinates: 15.52°N 78.35°E

Panyam
- Constituency No. 138 for the Andhra Pradesh Legislative Assembly
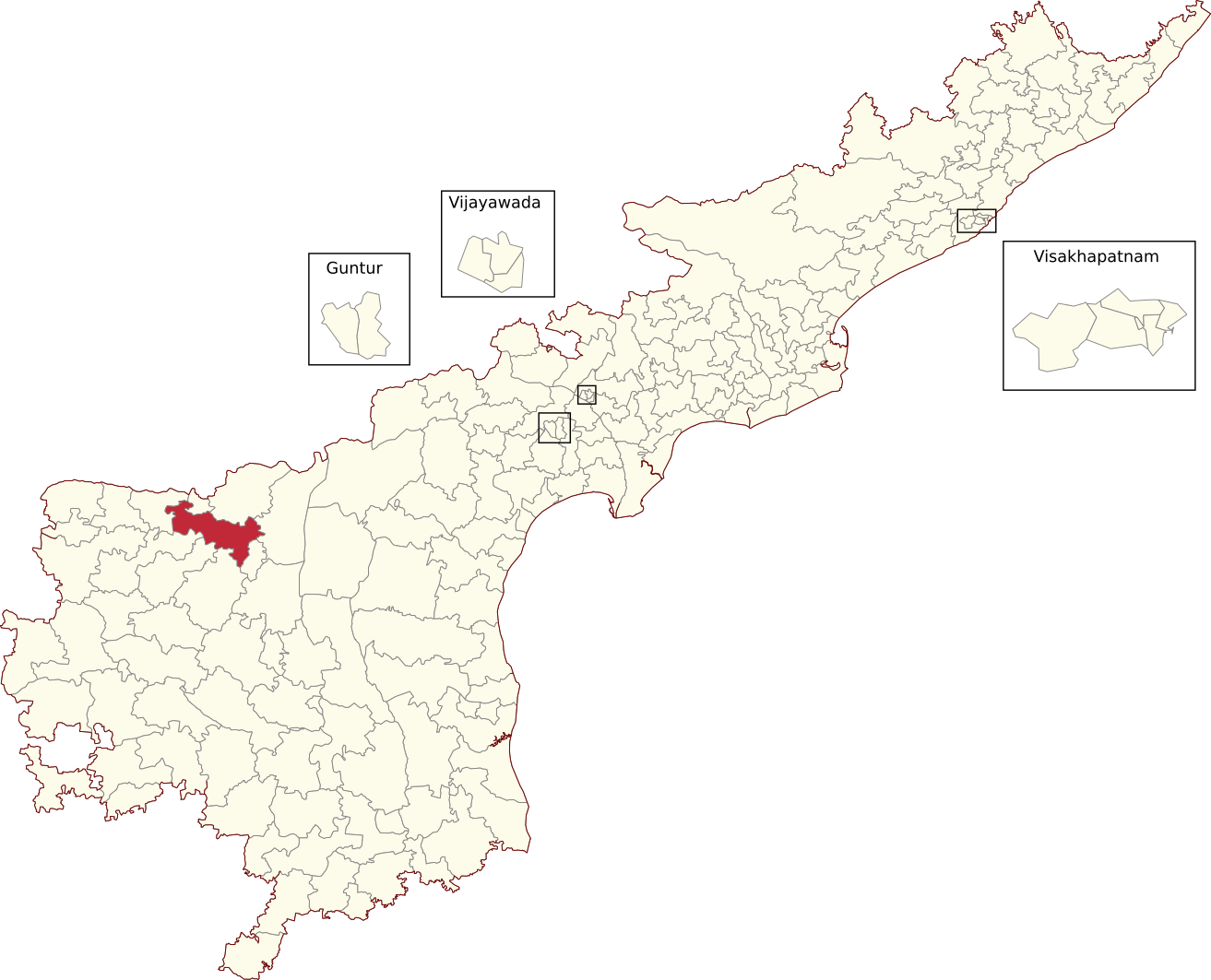
- Location of Panyam Assembly constituency within Andhra Pradesh

Constituency details
- Country: India
- Region: South India
- State: Andhra Pradesh
- District: Kurnool (partially); Nandyal (partially)
- Lok Sabha constituency: Nandyal
- Established: 1967
- Total electors: 288,031
- Reservation: None

Member of Legislative Assembly
- 16th Andhra Pradesh Legislative Assembly
- Incumbent Gowru Charitha Reddy
- Party: TDP
- Alliance: NDA
- Elected year: 2024

Panyam Assembly constituency is a constituency partially in Kurnool district and Nandyal district of Andhra Pradesh that elects represtatives to the Andhra Pradesh Legislative Assembly in India. It is one of the seven assembly segments of Nandyal Lok Sabha constituency.

Gowru Charitha Reddy is the current MLA of the constituency, having won the 2024 Andhra Pradesh Legislative Assembly election from Telugu Desam Party. As of 25 March 2019, there are a total of 288,031 electors in the constituency. The constituency was established in 1967, as per the Delimitation Orders (1967).

== Mandals ==
1. Gadivemula mandal, Nandyal district
2. Kallur mandal, Kurnool district
3. Orvakal mandal, Kurnool district
4. Panyam mandal, Nandyal district

Mandals in Panyam Assembly Constituency

== Members of the Legislative Assembly ==
Year	Member	Political party
1967	V. Reddy	Independent
1972	Erasu Ayyapu Reddy	Indian National Congress
1978	Erasu Ayyapu Reddy	Janata Party
1983	Challa Ramakrishna Reddy	Telugu Desam Party
1985	Katasani Ramabhupal Reddy	Indian National Congress
1989	Katasani Ramabhupal Reddy	Indian National Congress
1994	Katasani Ramabhupal Reddy	Indian National Congress
1999	Bijjam Partha Sarathi Reddy	Telugu Desam Party
2004	Katasani Ramabhupal Reddy	Indian National Congress
2009	Katasani Ramabhupal Reddy	Indian National Congress
2014	Gowru Charitha Reddy	YSR Congress Party
2019	Katasani Ramabhupal Reddy	YSR Congress Party
2024	Gowru Charitha Reddy	Telugu Desam Party

== Election results ==
=== 2004 ===
2004 Andhra Pradesh Legislative Assembly election: Panyam
Party	Candidate	Votes	%	±%
INC	Katasani Ramabhupal Reddy	63,077	49.65	+10.39
TDP	Bijjam Partha Sarathi Reddy	59,495	46.83	−12.25
Majority		4,592	2.82	
Turnout		127,055	68.63	+3.53
INC gain from TDP		Swing		

=== 2009 ===
2009 Andhra Pradesh Legislative Assembly election: Panyam
Party	Candidate	Votes	%	±%
INC	Katasani Ramabhupal Reddy	63,323	40.67	−8.98
TDP	Byreddy Rajasekher Reddy	54,409	34.95	−11.88
PRP	D.Vishnu Vardhan Reddy	28,600	18.37	
Majority		8,914	5.72	
Turnout		155,697	68.33	−0.30
INC hold		Swing		

=== 2014 ===
2014 Andhra Pradesh Legislative Assembly election: Panyam
Party	Candidate	Votes	%	±%
YSRCP	Gowru Charitha Reddy	72,245	35.76	
Independent	Katasani Ramabhupal Reddy	60,598	29.99	
TDP	Erasu Prathap Reddy	53,358	26.41	
Majority		11,647	5.77	
Turnout		202,038	82.32	+13.99
YSRCP gain from INC		Swing		

=== 2019 ===
2019 Andhra Pradesh Legislative Assembly election: Panyam
Party	Candidate	Votes	%	±%
YSRCP	Katasani Ramabhupal Reddy	122,473	56.78	
TDP	Gowru Charitha Reddy	78,619	36.45	
Majority		43,857	20.33	
Turnout		215,690		
YSRCP hold		Swing		

=== 2024 ===
2024 Andhra Pradesh Legislative Assembly election: Panyam
Party	Candidate	Votes	%	±%
TDP	Gowru Charitha Reddy	141,272	56.45	
YSRCP	Katasani Ramabhupal Reddy	1,00,681	40.23	
CPI(M)	D Gouse Desai	3,081	1.23	
NOTA	None Of The Above	2,663	1.06	
Majority		40,591	16.22	
Turnout		2,50,276		
TDP gain from YSRCP		Swing		

== See also ==
- List of constituencies of Andhra Pradesh Legislative Assembly
