= Srisailam Assembly constituency =

Constituency of the Andhra Pradesh Legislative Assembly, India

Coordinates: 16.07°N 78.87°E

Srisailam
- Constituency No. 135 for the Andhra Pradesh Legislative Assembly
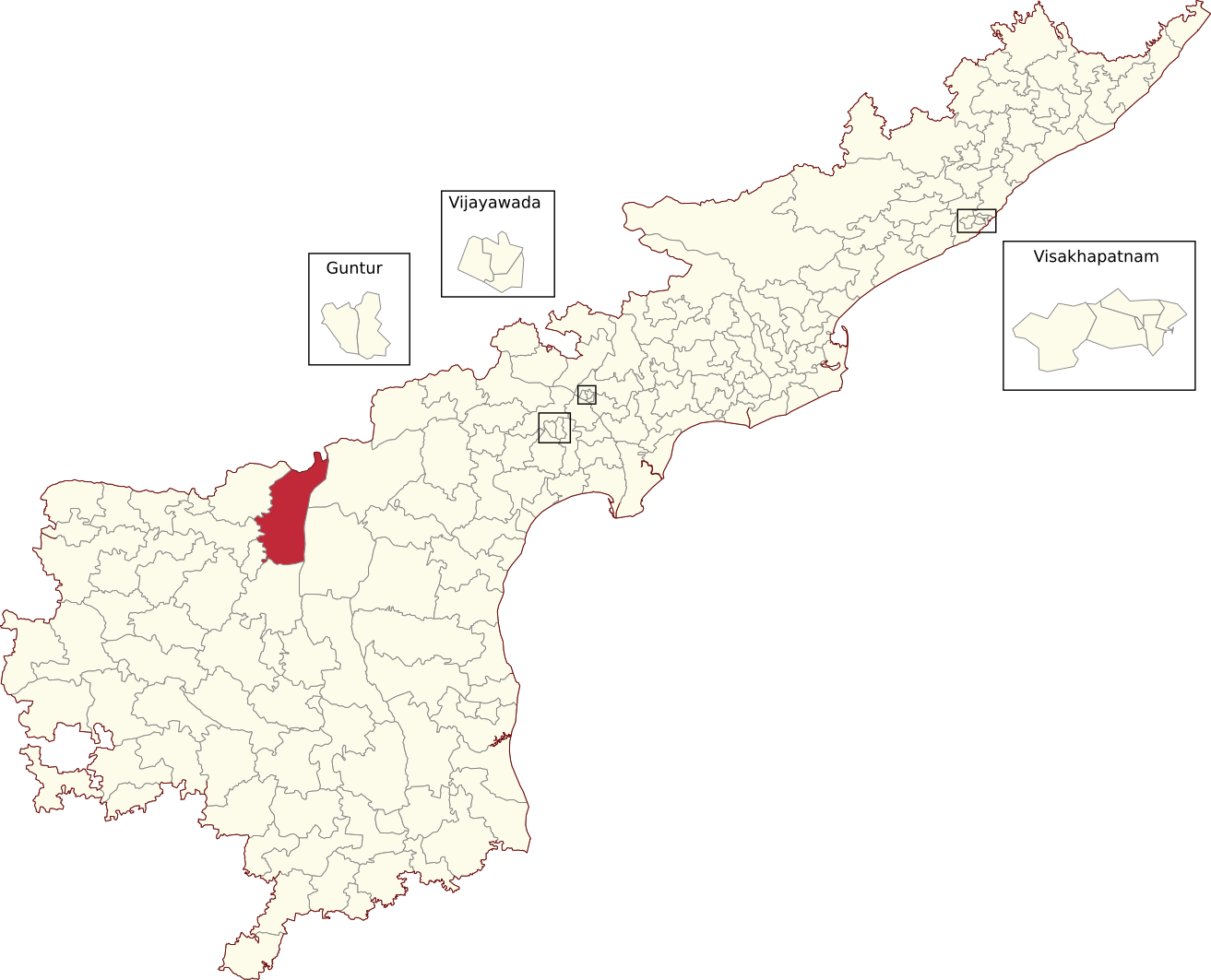
- Location of Srisailam Assembly constituency within Andhra Pradesh

Constituency details
- Country: India
- Region: South India
- State: Andhra Pradesh
- District: Nandyal
- Lok Sabha constituency: Nandyal
- Established: 2008
- Total electors: 184,794
- Reservation: None

Member of Legislative Assembly
- 16th Andhra Pradesh Legislative Assembly
- Incumbent Budda Rajasekhar Reddy
- Party: TDP
- Alliance: NDA
- Elected year: 2024

Srisailam Assembly constituency is a constituency in Nandyal district of Andhra Pradesh that elects representatives to the Andhra Pradesh Legislative Assembly in India. It is one of seven assembly segments of Nandyal Lok Sabha constituency.

Budda Rajasekhar Reddy is the current MLA of the constituency, having won the 2024 Andhra Pradesh Legislative Assembly election from Telugu Desam Party. As of 2019, there are a total of 184,794 electors in the constituency. The constituency was established in 2008, as per the Delimitation Orders (2008).

== Mandals ==
Mandal
Srisailam
Atmakur
Velgode
Bandi Atmakur
Mahanandi

== Members of the Legislative Assembly ==
Year	Member	Political party
2009	Erasu Prathap Reddy	Indian National Congress
2014	Budda Rajasekhar Reddy	YSR Congress Party
2019	Silpa Chakrapani Reddy	YSR Congress Party
2024	Budda Rajasekhar Reddy	Telugu Desam Party

== Election results ==
=== 2024 ===
2024 Andhra Pradesh Legislative Assembly election: Srisailam
Party	Candidate	Votes	%	±%
TDP	Budda Rajasekhar Reddy	81,699	49.64	
YSRCP	Silpa Chakrapani Reddy	75,314	45.76	
INC	Asar Syed Ismail	3,429	2.08	
NOTA	None Of The Above	1,077	0.65	
Majority		6,385	3.88	
Turnout		1,64,580		
TDP gain from YSRCP		Swing		

=== 2019 ===
2019 Andhra Pradesh Legislative Assembly election: Srisailam
Party	Candidate	Votes	%	±%
YSRCP	Silpa Chakrapani Reddy	92,236	60.41	+10.32
TDP	Budda Rajasekhar Reddy	53,538	35.07	−11.74
Majority		38,698	25.37	
Turnout		152,510	82.53	+1.82
YSRCP hold		Swing		

=== 2014 ===
2014 Andhra Pradesh Legislative Assembly election: Srisailam
Party	Candidate	Votes	%	±%
YSRCP	Budda Rajasekhar Reddy	74,249	50.09	
TDP	Silpa Chakrapani Reddy	69,388	46.81	
Majority		4,861	3.28	
Turnout		148,223	80.71	+2.69
YSRCP gain from INC		Swing		

=== 2009 ===
2009 Andhra Pradesh Legislative Assembly election: Srisailam
Party	Candidate	Votes	%	±%
INC	Erasu Prathap Reddy	49,384	42.70	
TDP	Budda Rajasekhera Reddy	45,077	38.98	
PRP	Budda Sesha Reddy	16,455	14.23	
BSP	Giri	1,448	1.25	
Majority		4,307	3.72	
Turnout		115,643	78.02	
INC win (new seat)				

== See also ==
- List of constituencies of Andhra Pradesh Legislative Assembly
