= S. P. Y. Reddy =

Indian politician (1950–2019)

Member of Parliament, Lok Sabha
- In office 16 May 2004 – 30 April 2019
- Preceded by: Bhuma Nagi Reddy
- Succeeded by: Pocha Brahmananda Reddy
- Constituency: Nandyal

Personal details
- Born: S. Pedda Yerikal Reddy; 4 June 1950 Ankalamma Gudur, Kadapa district, Andhra Pradesh
- Died: 30 April 2019 (aged 68) Hyderabad
- Party: Jana Sena Party (2019) Telugu Desam Party (2016–2019); YSR Congress Party (2014–2016) (defected); Indian National Congress (2000- 2014); Independent (1999 - 2000) Bharatiya Janata Party (1991 - 1999)
- Spouse: S. Parvathi
- Children: 2
- Education: B. E. Mech. (NIT Warangal)
- As of 15 January, 2015

S. Pedda Yerikal Reddy (4 June 1950 – 30 April 2019) was a three-time Lok Sabha MP and Industrialist who headed the Nandi Group of Industries. He was born on 4 June 1950 in the Ankalammagudur village from Kadapa district of Andhra Pradesh. He graduated with a bachelor's degree in mechanical engineering from NIT Warangal and joined the Mumbai-based Bhabha Atomic Research Centre, India's premium nuclear facility. He quit the position of a Scientific Officer in 1977 and set up a plastic containers manufacturing plant in 1979. Thereafter, he diversified his company's operations into PVC pipes manufacturing in 1984 under the name of Nandi Pipes.

== Biography ==
SPY Reddy began his political career with BJP and unsuccessfully contested from Nandyal Loksabha constituency in 1991 elections. In the 1999 Assembly elections he contested from both Nandyal and Giddalur assembly constituencies as an independent candidate and lost both seats. In 2000, he procured the ticket for municipal chairman candidacy for congress and won with record majority. In 2004 he contested as an MP candidate from Nandyal and won with 1 lakh majority. In 2009, he once again won from the same constituency. In 2014, he won for the third time as MP from Nandyal.

He won the 2014 elections on a YSRCP ticket and later defected to TDP. In 2019, he left TDP as it denied a ticket to him and joined Janasena party and fought the election on its ticket. He died on 30 April 2019 aged 69 due to multi-organ failure.
