= N. Md. Farooq =

Indian politician

Nasyam Mohammed Farooq
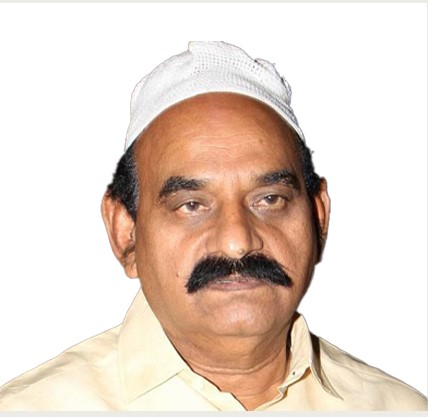

Minister of Law and Justice, Minority Welfare Government of Andhra Pradesh
- Incumbent
- Assumed office 12 June 2024
- Governor: Syed Abdul Nazeer
- Chief Minister: N. Chandrababu Naidu
- Preceded by: Amzath Basha Shaik Bepari

Minister of Minority Welfare & Empowerment, Medical Education, Dr. N. T. R. University of Health Sciences, Dr. Nandamuri Taraka Rama Rao Vaidya Seva, Andhra Pradesh Medical Technology Zone, Andhra Pradesh Medical Services and Infrastructure Development Corporation Government of Andhra Pradesh
- In office 11 November 2018 – 29 May 2019
- Governor: E. S. L. Narasimhan
- Chief Minister: N. Chandrababu Naidu
- Preceded by: N. Chandrababu Naidu (Chief Minister)
- Succeeded by: Amzath Basha Shaik Bepari

8th Chairperson of the Andhra Pradesh Legislative Council
- In office 15 November 2017 – 10 November 2018
- Governor: E. S. L. Narasimhan
- Leader of the House: N. Chandrababu Naidu
- Preceded by: A. Chakrapani
- Succeeded by: Shariff Mohammed Ahmed

Member of Legislative Council Andhra Pradesh
- In office 26 July 2017 – 25 July 2023
- Governor: E. S. L. Narasimhan
- Leader of the House: N. Chandrababu Naidu
- Succeeded by: Kumbha Ravibabu
- Constituency: Nominated by Governor

Minister of Higher Education, Minority Welfare, Waqf & Urdu Academy Government of Andhra Pradesh
- In office 11 September 2002 - 14 May 2004
- Governor: C. Rangarajan; Surjit Singh Barnala
- Chief Minister: N. Chandrababu Naidu
- Succeeded by: Mohammed Ali Shabbir

Minister of Municipal Administration & Urban Development, Minority Welfare, Waqf & Urdu Academy Government of Andhra Pradesh
- In office 22 November 1999 - 11 September 2002
- Governor: C. Rangarajan
- Chief Minister: N. Chandrababu Naidu

14th Deputy Speaker of the Andhra Pradesh Legislative Assembly
- In office 17 January 1995 - 9 October 1999
- Governor: Krishan Kant; Gopala Ramanujam; C. Rangarajan
- Speaker: Yanamala Ramakrishnudu
- Chief Minister: N. Chandrababu Naidu
- Preceded by: Buragadda Veda Vyas
- Succeeded by: K. Chandrashekar Rao

Minister of Sugar, Wakf, and Urdu Academy Government of Andhra Pradesh
- In office 9 March 1985 - 11 July 1987
- Governor: Shankar Dayal Sharma
- Chief Minister: N. T. Rama Rao

Member of Legislative Assembly Andhra Pradesh
- Incumbent
- Assumed office 21 June 2024
- Preceded by: Silpa Ravi Chandra Kishore Reddy
- Constituency: Nandyala
- In office 12 December 1994 – 14 November 2003
- Preceded by: V. Ramanath Reddy
- Succeeded by: Silpa Mohan Reddy
- Constituency: Nandyala
- In office 8 March 1985 – 28 November 1989
- Preceded by: M. Sanjeeva Reddy
- Succeeded by: V. Ramanath Reddy
- Constituency: Nandyala

Personal details
- Born: 15 May 1950 (age 75) Nandyala, Kurnool District
- Party: Telugu Desam Party
- Children: 6
- Occupation: Politician

Nasyam Mohammed Farooq (born 15 May 1950) is an Indian politician who is currently MLA of Nandyala Assembly Constituency from TDP elected in 2024 elections and served as the 9th chairman of the Andhra Pradesh Legislative Council. Farooq is a nominated member of the Andhra Pradesh Legislative Council and is a member of the TDP.

== Political career ==
He was the cabinet minister for Health education and minority welfare in Government of Andhra Pradesh, serving from November 2018 till May 2019.

He is a senior minority TDP politician since the formation of TDP and as minister for Sugar, Wakf minority welfare and Urdu Academy in N. T. Rama Rao's cabinet in 1984 ministry and 1994 to 2004 he served as deputy speaker and Municipal urban development minority welfare and Higher education minister. He previously served as a councillor as well as vice chairman of Nandyal Municipality and member of Andhra Pradesh Legislative Assembly. On 10 November 2018, he was inducted into the cabinet by Chief Minister Chandrababu Naidu after serving as the Chairman of the Andhra Pradesh Legislative Council for nearly one year. After that he served as the Health and minority empowerment minister in Government of Andhra Pradesh.

Chandrababu Naidu said that Mr. N.M.D. Farooq had vast political experience of 40 years and Mr. Farooq had earlier served under several Ministries in NTR cabinet and Chandrababu Naidu cabinet and the Chairman of the Legislative Council of Andhra Pradesh.
