= Isaiah Yakkaladevi =

Indian politician

Isaiah Yakkaladevi (born 1948) is an Indian politician from Andhra Pradesh. He was a former member of the Andhra Pradesh Legislative Assembly from Nandikotkur Assembly constituency which is reserved for the Scheduled Caste community in Kurnool district representing the YSR Congress Party.

== Early life ==
Yakkaladevi is from Nandikotkur, Kurnool district, Andhra Pradesh. He is the son Y. Gnanayudham. He completed his B.Sc. at Andhra Christian College, Guntur in 1971. He declared assets worth Rs.1 crore in his affidavit to the Election Commission of India.

== Career ==
Yakkaladevi won the Nandikotkur Assembly constituency in the 2014 Andhra Pradesh Legislative Assembly election representing the YSR Congress Party. He polled 87,496 and defeated his nearest rival, Labbi Venkata Swamy of the Telugu Desam Party, by a margin of 21, 814 votes.
