= Byreddy Rajasekhar Reddy =

Indian politician (born 1954)

Member of Legislative Assembly, Andhra Pradesh
- In office 1994–2004
- Preceded by: Byreddy Sesha Sayna Reddy
- Succeeded by: Manadra Gidda Reddy Gowru Venkat Reddy
- Constituency: Nandikotkur

Personal details
- Born: 1954 (age 71–72) Nandikotkur, Andhra State, India (now in Andhra Pradesh, India)
- Party: Bharatiya Janata Party (since 2019)
- Other political affiliations: Telugu Desam Party (1994–2012; 2019); Rayalaseema Parirakshana Samithi (2013–2018); Indian National Congress (2018–2019)
- Children: Byreddy Shabari (daughter)
- Education: Badruka College, Hyderabad; Sir CR Reddy College, Eluru

Byreddy Rajasekhar Reddy (born 1954) is an Indian politician and founder of Rayalaseema Parirakshana Samithi, for separate statehood for Rayalaseema region of Andhra Pradesh.

== Early life and education ==
He was born in Muchumarri village, Pagidyal mandal in Nandikotkur, Kurnool district, Andhra Pradesh to Byreddy Seshasayana Reddy and late Srimati Susheelamma. Shree Seshasayana Reddy was a three time MLA and he also served as an MLC. Rajasekhar Reddy studied at Badruka College, Hyderabad affiliated with Osmania University (B.Com. 1972–75) and he did M.Com. at Sir CR Reddy College, Eluru, West Godavari District AP.

== Family ==
His daughter Byreddy Shabari currently represents Nandyal Lok Sabha.

== Career ==
He was an MLA & Cabinet Minister from Nandikotkur constituency in 1994 and 1999 with Telugu Desam Party. He lost election in 2004 and 2009 general elections.

=== Rayalaseema Parirakshana Samithi ===
He quit TDP in September 2012 and formed Rayalaseema Parirakshana Samithi (RPS). He has been opposing the bifurcation of the state, and is demanding separate Rayalaseema, in case Telangana statehood is granted.

He did various programmes to bring into focus the problems of Rayalaseema. He undertook a 4-month-long Tractor Yatra across the region, covering over 3000 kilometers.

He started ground-level (village level) Bus YATRA program to bring into focus the problems of Rayalaseema from February 2016.

He is launching a political outfit soon in Tirupathi.
