= Budda Rajasekhar Reddy =

Indian politician

Member of the Andhra Pradesh Legislative Assembly
- Incumbent
- Assumed office 4 June 2024
- Preceded by: Silpa Chakrapani Reddy
- Constituency: Srisailam
- In office 2014–2019
- Preceded by: Earasu Prathap Reddy
- Succeeded by: Silpa Chakrapani Reddy
- Constituency: Srisailam

Personal details
- Party: Telugu Desam Party
- Other political affiliations: YSR Congress Party
- Occupation: Politician

Budda Rajasekhar Reddy is an Indian politician belonging to Telugu Desam Party. He is the current Member of the Legislative Assembly for the state of Andhra Pradesh representing Srisailam Assembly constituency. He won for the first time in 2014 Andhra Pradesh Legislative Assembly election representing YSR Congress Party. He later joined the Telugu Desam Party in 2016.

== Election results ==
=== 2024 ===
2024 Andhra Pradesh Legislative Assembly election: Srisailam
Party	Candidate	Votes	%	±%
TDP	Budda Raja Sekhara Reddy	81,699	49.64	
YSRCP	SILPA CHAKRAPANI REDDY	75,314	45.76	
INC	ISMAIL.A.S	3,429	2.08	
Majority		6,385		
Turnout		1,64,580		
TDP gain from YSRCP		Swing		

=== 2019 ===
2019 Andhra Pradesh Legislative Assembly election: Srisailam
Party	Candidate	Votes	%	±%
YSRCP	Silpa Chakrapani Reddy	92,236	60.41	+10.32
TDP	Budda Raja Sekhara Reddy	53,538	35.07	−11.74
Majority		38,698	25.37	
Turnout		152,510	82.53	+1.82
YSRCP hold		Swing		

=== 2014 ===
2014 Andhra Pradesh Legislative Assembly election: Srisailam
Party	Candidate	Votes	%	±%
YSRCP	Budda Raja Sekhara Reddy	74,249	50.09	
TDP	Silpa Chakrapani Reddy	69,388	46.81	
Majority		4,861	3.28	
Turnout		148,223	80.71	+2.69
YSRCP gain from INC		Swing		
