= Gangula Brijendra Reddy =

Indian politician

Member Of Andhra Pradesh Legislative Assembly
- In office 21 May 2019 – June 2024
- Governor: Syed Abdul Nazeer
- Chief Minister: YS Jagan Mohan Reddy
- Preceded by: Bhuma Akhila Priya
- Succeeded by: Bhuma Akhila Priya
- Constituency: Allagadda

Personal details
- Born: 1988 (age 37–38) Erragundine
- Party: YSR Congress Party
- Parent: Gangula Prabakar Reddy
- Occupation: Politician

Gangula Brijendra Reddy (born 1988) is an Indian politician from Andhra Pradesh. He is an MLA of YSR Congress Party from Allagadda Assembly constituency in Kurnool district. He won the 2019 Andhra Pradesh Legislative Assembly election.

== Early life and education ==
Reddy was born in Allagadda village to Prabhakar Reddy. He completed his B.Com. from St Mary's College, Yousufguda.

== Career ==
Reddy started his political journey with YSR Congress Party following the foot steps of his father, who was a former MLA and government whip. He won the 2019 Andhra Pradesh Legislative Assembly election representing YSR Congress Party defeating Bhuma Akhila Priya of Telugu Desam Party by a margin of 35,613 votes.

== MLA Terms ==
1st Term

=== 2019 ===
2019 Andhra Pradesh Legislative Assembly election: Allagadda
Party	Candidate	Votes	%	±%
YSRCP	Gangula Brijendra Reddy (Nani)	105,905	57.03	
TDP	Bhuma Akhila Priya	70,292	37.85	
Majority		35,613	19.18	
Turnout		1,85,693		
YSRCP hold		Swing		

2nd Term

2024 Andhra Pradesh Legislative Assembly election: Allagadda
Party	Candidate	Votes	%	±%
YSRCP	Gangula Brijendra Reddy (Nani)			
TDP	Bhuma Akhila Priya			
INC	Baragodla Hussain			
NOTA	None Of The Above			
Majority				
Turnout				
		Swing		
