= Silpa Ravi Chandra Kishore Reddy =

Indian politician

Member of Legislative Assembly Andhra Pradesh
- In office 2019–2024
- Preceded by: Bhuma Brahmananda Reddy
- Succeeded by: N. M. D. Farooq
- Constituency: Nandyal

Personal details
- Born: 1985 (age 40–41) Nandyal, India
- Party: YSR Congress party
- Parent: Silpa Chandra Mohan (father)
- Education: Indian Institute of Planning and Management
- Occupation: Politician

Silpa Ravi Chandra Kishore Reddy (born 1985) is an Indian politician from Andhra Pradesh. He was an MLA of YSR Congress Party from Nandyal Assembly constituency in Kurnool district. He won the 2019 Andhra Pradesh Legislative Assembly election. He is a close friend to Allu Arjun. He lost the 2024 election from Nandyal seat, also on YSRCP ticket.

== Early life and education ==
Reddy was born in Nandyal to Chandra Mohan, a two-time MLA from Nandyal. He completed a post-graduate management diploma from IIPM, New Delhi.

== Career ==
Reddy started his political career with the YSR Congress Party. He became MLA for the first time winning the 2019 Andhra Pradesh Legislative Assembly election from Nandyal representing YSRCP. He defeated Bhuma Brahmananda Reddy of Telugu Desam Party by a margin of 34,560 votes. He lost the 2024 Andhra Pradesh Legislative Assembly election to N. M. D. Farooq of the Telugu Desam Party by a margin of 12,333 votes. Farooq polled 103,075 votes against 90,742 for Reddy.
