= Rayalaseema Parirakshana Samithi =

Rayalaseema Parirakshana Samithi రాయలసీమ పరిరక్షణ సమితి
- Chairperson: Byreddy Rajasekhar Reddy
- Founded: 2013
- Dissolved: 2017
- Headquarters: Kurnool, Andhra Pradesh, India
- Ideology: Rayalaseema regionalism
- ECI Status: Unrecognised Party
- Seats in Rajya Sabha: 0
- Seats in Lok Sabha: 0

Election symbol
- gas cylinder

Rayalaseema Parirakshana Samithi (RPS) is a regional political party in the south Indian state of Andhra Pradesh with the main aim of creating a new state, Rayalaseema. The party was founded by former Telugu Desam Party leader Byreddy Rajasekhara Reddy in 2013 to champion the cause for a separate Rayalaseema state after the resolution passed on 30 July 2013 to carve out the state of Telangana from the pre-existing state of Andhra Pradesh.
