= Thoguru Arthur =

Indian politician (born 1955)

Member of Legislative Assembly, Andhra Pradesh
- In office 2019–2024
- Preceded by: Yakkaladevi Isaiah
- Succeeded by: Githa Jayasurya
- Constituency: Nandikotkur

Personal details
- Party: YSR Congress Party
- Other political affiliations: Indian National Congress

Thoguru Arthur (10 July 1955) is an Indian politician from Andhra Pradesh. He won the 2019 Andhra Pradesh Legislative Assembly Election on YSRCP ticket from Nandikotkur, a constituency reserved for SCs in Kurnool district. He won the MLA seat defeating his nearest rival Bandi Jayaraju of TDP by 40,610 votes. On 19 March 2024, ahead of the General elections to the parliament and the 2024 AP Assembly elections, he quit the ruling YSRCP and joined the Indian National Congress.

== Early life and education ==
Arthur hails from Maddur village in Pamulapadu mandal, Kurnool district. His parents are Thoguru Samuel and Marthamma. He married V. Papamma. He completed his graduation in 1981 from the Government Degree College for men, Kurnool. He has a son Vivek Jaya Sandeep and his daughter Vijaya Siri Sindhura is a graduate from IIT, Guwahati and joined TISS in 2023.

== Career ==
He was an ardent follower of former chief minister late Y. S. Rajasekhar Reddy. He missed the MLA ticket in 2014 but won the Nandikotkur seat in 2019. Earlier, during the period of Chandrababu Naidu, he worked as Chief Marshal in the Assembly for three years. In 1982, he joined the police service as a sub inspector.

== Honors ==
Arthur received a certificate of appreciation from the London World Book of Records for his service in the constituency during the Covid pandemic.
