= Pocha Brahmananda Reddy =

Member of 17th lok Sabha

Member of Parliament, Lok Sabha
- In office 23 May 2019 – 2024
- Preceded by: SPY Reddy
- Succeeded by: Byreddy Shabari
- Constituency: Nandyal

Personal details
- Born: 1 January 1958 (age 68) Uyyalawada
- Party: YSR Congress Party
- Spouse: Pocha Ramapullamma
- Children: 3

Pocha Brahmananda Reddy is an Indian politician. He was elected to the Lok Sabha, lower house of the Parliament of India from Nandyal, Andhra Pradesh in the 2019 Indian general election as a member of the YSR Congress Party.
