= Nandikotkur Assembly constituency =

Constituency of the Andhra Pradesh Legislative Assembly, India

Coordinates: 15.85°N 78.26°E

Nandikotkur
- Constituency No. 136 for the Andhra Pradesh Legislative Assembly
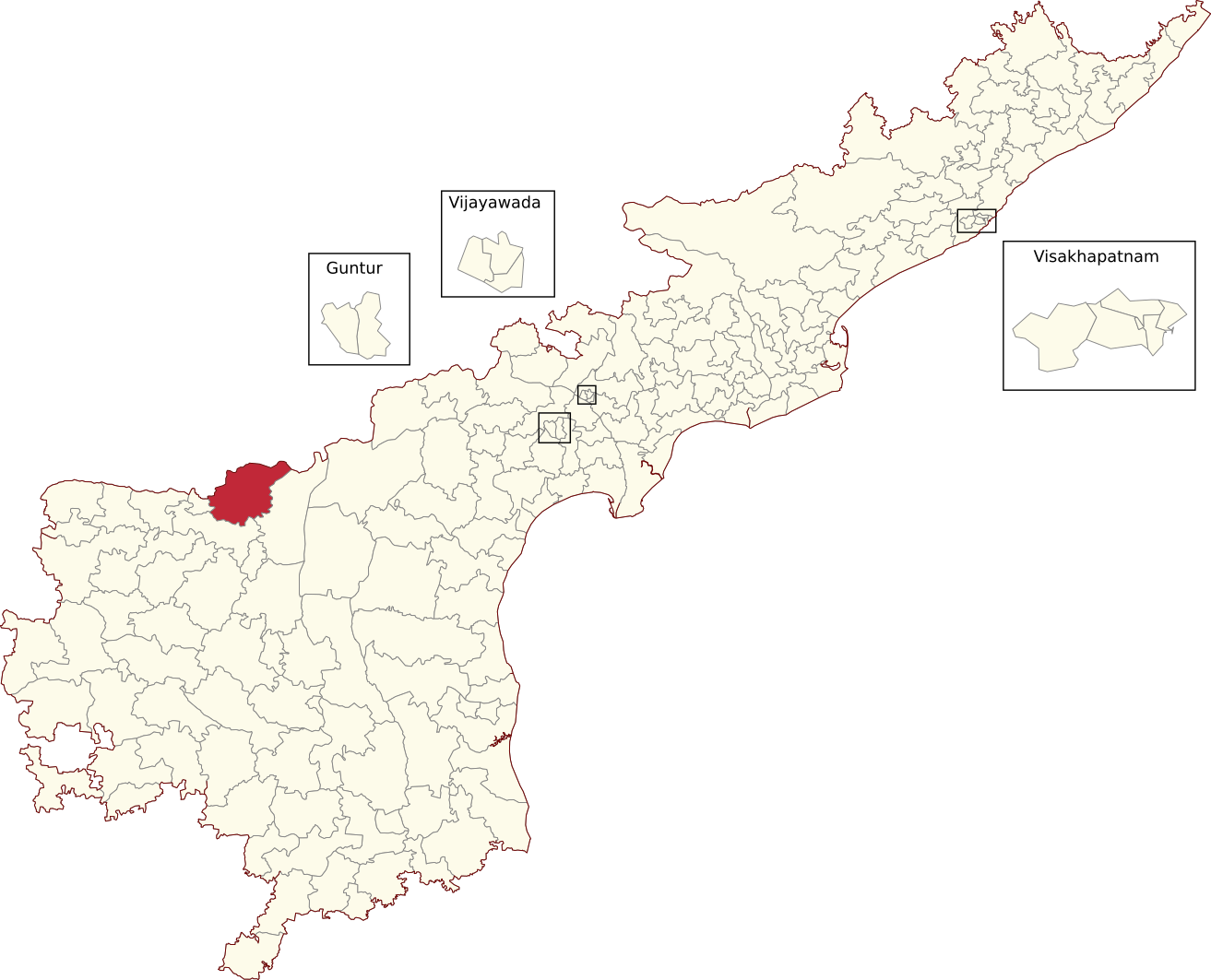
- Location of Nandikotkur Assembly constituency within Andhra Pradesh

Constituency details
- Country: India
- Region: South India
- State: Andhra Pradesh
- District: Nandyal
- Lok Sabha constituency: Nandyal
- Established: 1951
- Total electors: 197,451
- Reservation: SC

Member of Legislative Assembly
- 16th Andhra Pradesh Legislative Assembly
- Incumbent Githa Jayasurya
- Party: TDP
- Alliance: NDA
- Elected year: 2024

Nandikotkur is a Scheduled Caste reserved constituency in Nandyal district of Andhra Pradesh that elects representatives to the Andhra Pradesh Legislative Assembly in India It is one of the seven assembly segments of Nandyal Lok Sabha constituency.

Githa Jayasurya is the current MLA of the constituency, having won the 2024 Andhra Pradesh Legislative Assembly election from Telugu Desam Party. As of 25 March 2019, there are a total of 197,451 electors in the constituency. The constituency was established in 1951, as per the Delimitation Orders (1951).

== Mandals ==
Mandal
Nandikotkur
Pagidyala
J. Bungalow
Kothapalle
Pamulapadu
Midthur

== Members of the Legislative Assembly ==
| Year | Member | Political party |
|---|---|---|
| 1952 | Chandra Pulla Reddy | Communist Party of India |
| 1955 | N. K. Lingam | Indian National Congress |
| 1955 | Earasu Ayyapa Reddy | Indian National Congress |
| 1962 | Pulyala Venkatakrishna Reddy | Independent |
| 1967 | C. R. Reddy | Indian National Congress |
| 1972 | Maddru Subba Reddy | Indian National Congress |
| 1978 | Byreddy Sesha Sayana Reddy | Indian National Congress |
| 1983 | Byreddy Sesha Sayana Reddy | Independent |
| 1985 | Ippala Thimmareddy | Telugu Desam Party |
| 1989 | Byreddy Sesha Sayana Reddy | Indian National Congress |
| 1994 | Byreddy Rajasekhara Reddy | Telugu Desam Party |
| 1999 | Byreddy Rajasekhara Reddy | Telugu Desam Party |
| 2004 | Gowru Charitha Reddy | Indian National Congress |
| 2009 | Labbi Venkata Swamy | Indian National Congress |
| 2014 | Isaiah Yakkaladevi | YSR Congress Party |
| 2019 | Thoguru Arthur | YSR Congress Party |
| 2024 | Githa Jayasurya | Telugu Desam Party |

== Election results ==
=== 1952 ===
1952 Madras Legislative Assembly election: Nandikotkur
| Party | Candidate | Votes | % | ±% |
|---|---|---|---|---|
| CPI | C. Pulla Reddy | 25,266 | 54.09% | |
| INC | Subba Reddy | 13,341 | 28.56% | 28.56% |
| KLP | Venkata Rama Reddi | 5,215 | 11.16% | |
| Independent | Swami Narayananda Saraswathi | 1,880 | 4.02% | |
| Independent | Venkata Krishnayya | 1,013 | 2.17% | |
| Margin of victory | | 11,925 | 25.53% | |
| Turnout | | 46,715 | 65.81% | |
| Registered electors | | 70,983 | | |
| CPI win (new seat) | | | | |

=== 2004 ===
2004 Andhra Pradesh Legislative Assembly election: Nandikotkur
| Party | Candidate | Votes | % | ±% |
|---|---|---|---|---|
| INC | Gowru Charitha Reddy | 69,209 | 53.87 | +11.20 |
| TDP | Byreddy Rajasekhar Reddy | 55,721 | 43.37 | −12.86 |
| Majority | | 13,488 | 10.50 | |
| Turnout | | 128,479 | 74.65 | +5.65 |
| INC gain from TDP | | Swing | | |

=== 2009 ===
2009 Andhra Pradesh Legislative Assembly election: Nandikotkur
| Party | Candidate | Votes | % | ±% |
|---|---|---|---|---|
| INC | Labbi Venkata Swamy | 63,442 | 44.91 | −8.96 |
| TDP | Chimme Bitchanna | 57,669 | 40.82 | −2.55 |
| PRP | Madarapu Renukamma | 11,968 | 8.47 | |
| Majority | | 5,773 | 4.09 | |
| Turnout | | 141,276 | 76.88 | +2.23 |
| INC hold | | Swing | | |

=== 2014 ===
2014 Andhra Pradesh Legislative Assembly election: Nandikotkur
| Party | Candidate | Votes | % | ±% |
|---|---|---|---|---|
| YSRCP | Isaiah Yakkaladevi | 87,496 | 54.68 | |
| TDP | Labbi Venkata Swamy | 65,682 | 41.05 | |
| Majority | | 21,814 | 13.63 | |
| Turnout | | 160,024 | 78.62 | +1.74 |
| YSRCP gain from INC | | Swing | | |

=== 2019 ===
2019 Andhra Pradesh Legislative Assembly election: Nandikotkur
| Party | Candidate | Votes | % | ±% |
|---|---|---|---|---|
| YSRCP | Thoguru Arthur | 102,565 | 59.45% | |
| TDP | Bandi Jayaraju | 61,955 | 35.91% | |
| Majority | | 40,610 | 23.54% | |
| Turnout | | 172,529 | 87.37% | +8.75 |
| YSRCP hold | | Swing | | |

=== 2024 ===
2024 Andhra Pradesh Legislative Assembly election: Nandikotkur
| Party | Candidate | Votes | % | ±% |
|---|---|---|---|---|
| TDP | Githa Jayasurya | 92,004 | 49.24 | |
| YSRCP | Dr. Dara Sudheer | 82,212 | 44.00 | |
| INC | Arthur Thoguru | 7,949 | 4.25 | |
| NOTA | None Of The Above | 1,274 | 0.68 | |
| Majority | | 9,792 | 5.24 | |
| Turnout | | 1,86,853 | | |
| TDP gain from YSRCP | | Swing | | |

== See also ==
- List of constituencies of Andhra Pradesh Legislative Assembly
