= Rayasam Seshagiri Rao =

Indian politician

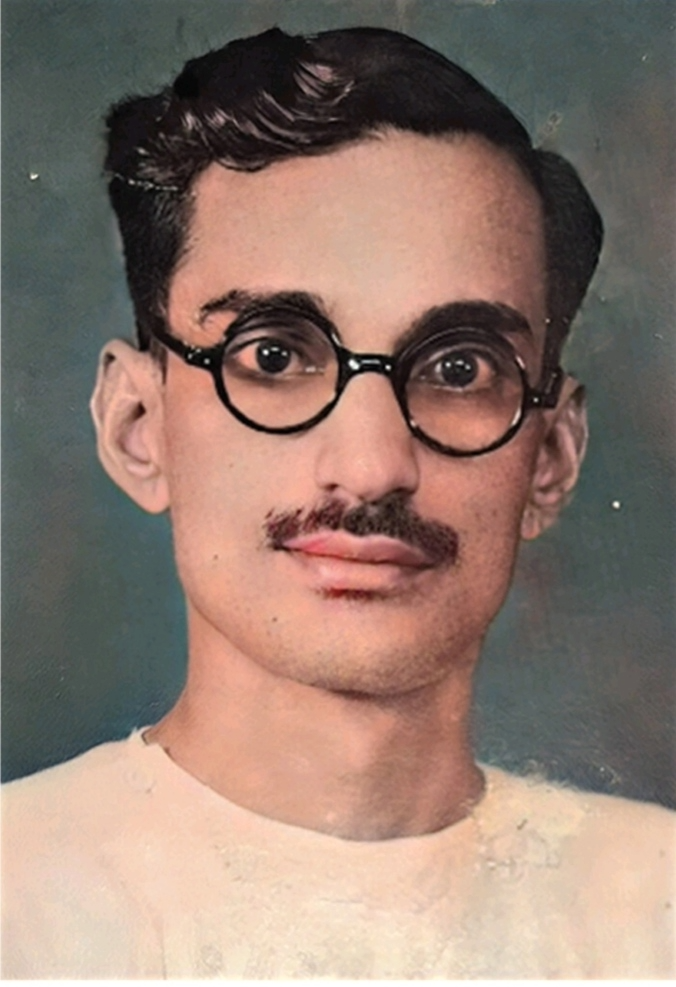
- Profile picture

Member of Parliament
- In office 1952-1957
- Succeeded by: Pendekanti Venkatasubbaiah
- Constituency: Nandyal

Personal details
- Born: 13, July 1909
- Died: May 30, 1963 (aged 53)
- Spouse: R. Kamalamma
- Education: B.A., B.L.

Rayasam Seshagiri Rao (born 13 July 1909 - died 1963) was a member of the 1st Lok Sabha of India and won the 1952 elections as an independent candidate. He represented the Nandyal constituency of Andhra Pradesh. He was born on 13 July 1909 at Nandyal of Andhra Pradesh. He graduated with a Bachelor's degree in law from Presidency College, Madras. He was married to Smt. Kamalamma in 1925.

He was an advocate; and served as President of Bar Association. He was an adviser to Land Mortgage Bank and served as secretary, Rayalaseema Maha Sabha.

He was also a poet, and awarded title of Kavi Shekhara by Sahitya Parishad. His published works include: Nadeswari, Maharishi Mahanandayya, Panikeswara Mahatmyamu, Kalyan Manjari, and playlet Krotta Namoona (1933). He also authored a book on astrology.
