= Allagadda Assembly constituency =

Constituency of the Andhra Pradesh Legislative Assembly, India

Coordinates: 15.13°N 78.51°E

Allagadda
- Constituency No. 134 for the Andhra Pradesh Legislative Assembly
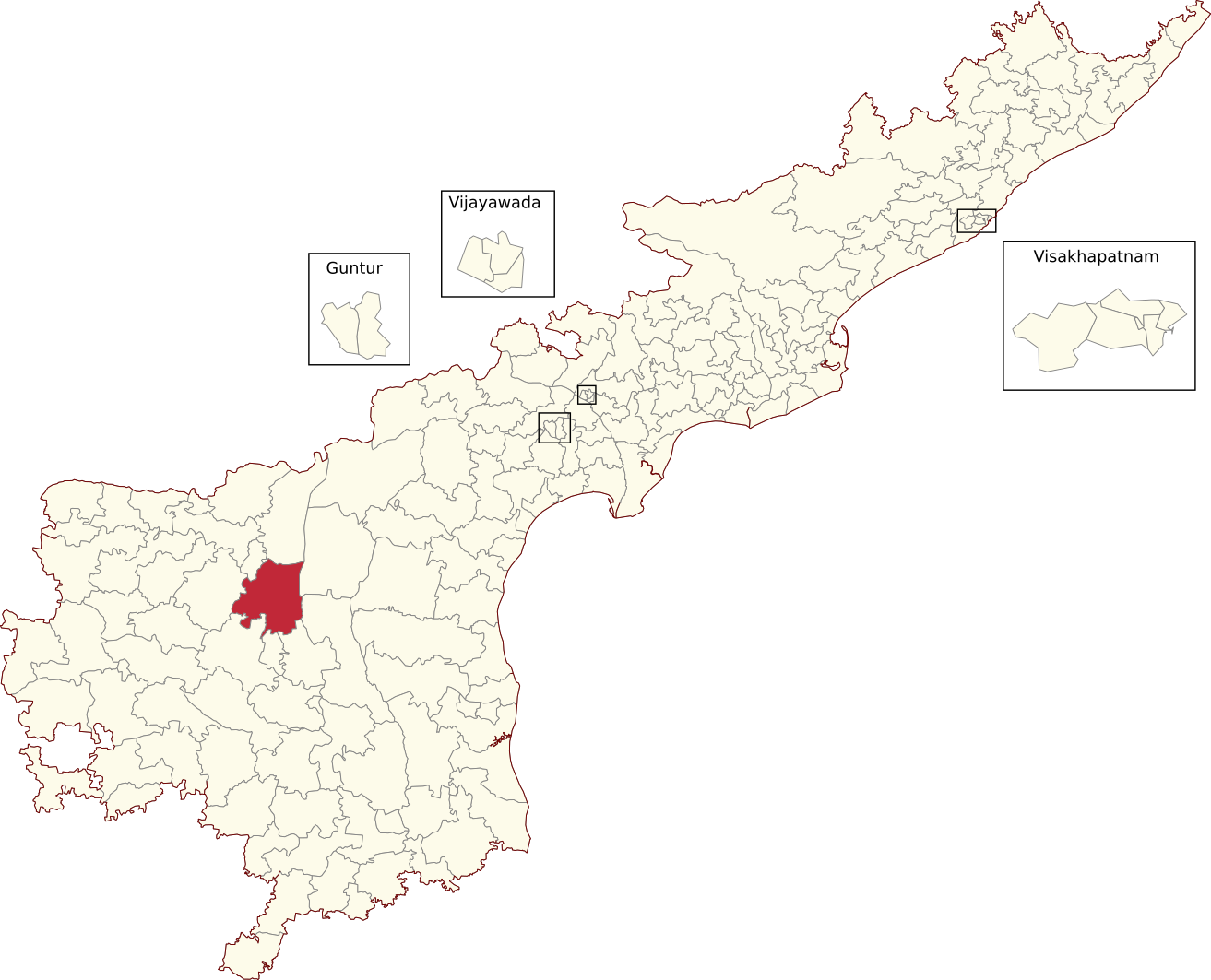
- Location of Allagadda Assembly constituency within Andhra Pradesh

Constituency details
- Country: India
- Region: South India
- State: Andhra Pradesh
- District: Nandyal
- Lok Sabha constituency: Nandyal
- Established: 1962
- Total electors: 220,642
- Reservation: None

Member of Legislative Assembly
- 16th Andhra Pradesh Legislative Assembly
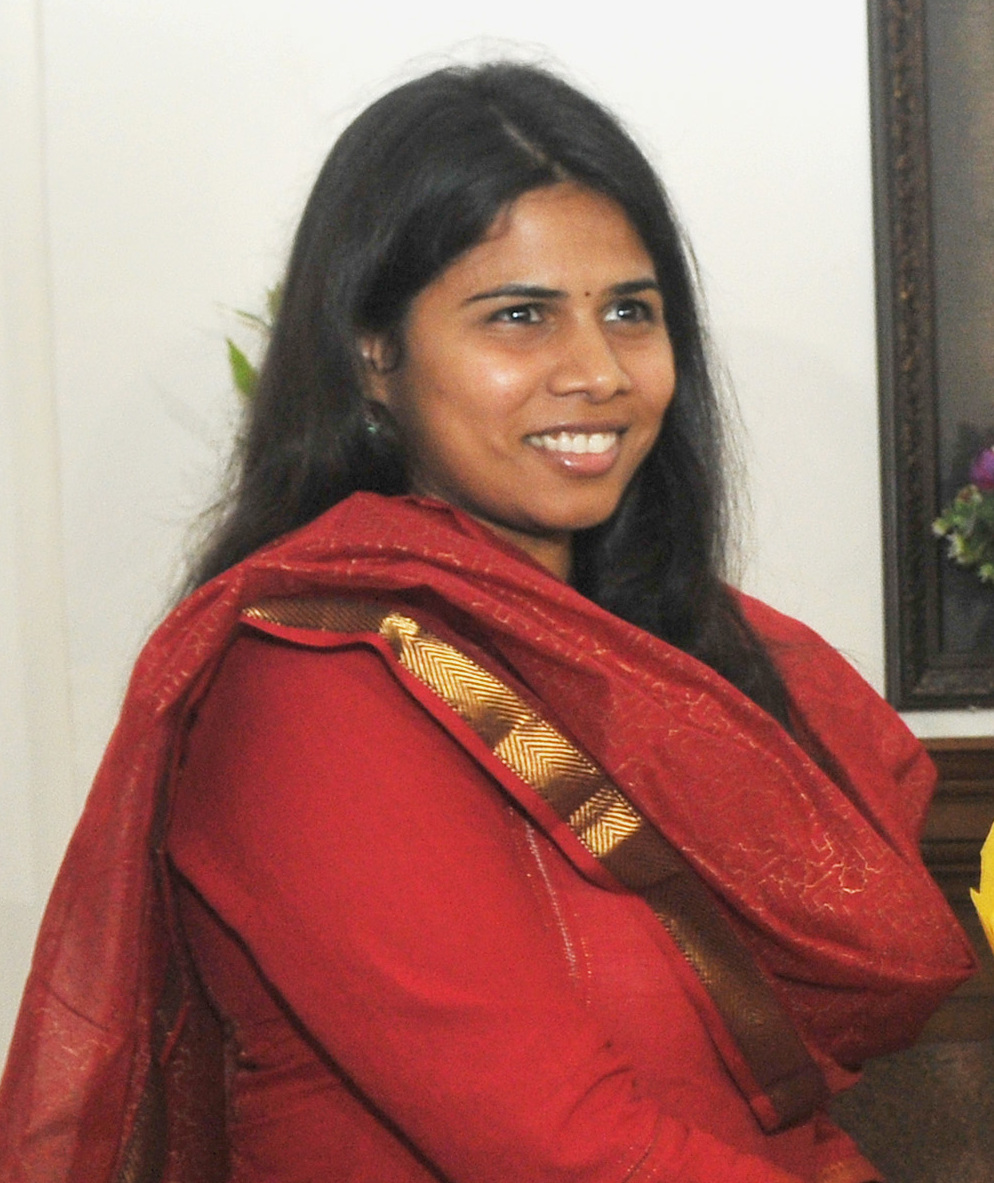
- Incumbent Bhuma Akhila Priya
- Party: TDP
- Alliance: NDA
- Elected year: 2024

Allagadda Assembly constituency is a constituency in Nandyal district of Andhra Pradesh that elects representatives to the Andhra Pradesh Legislative Assembly in India. It is one of the seven assembly segments of Nandyal Lok Sabha constituency.

Bhuma Akhila Priya is the current MLA of the constituency, having won the 2024 Andhra Pradesh Legislative Assembly election from Telugu Desam Party. As of 13 May 2024, there are a total of 220,642 electors in the constituency. The constituency was established in 1962, as per the Delimitation Orders (1962).

== Mandals ==
Mandal
Allagadda
Sirvel
Dornipadu
Uyyalawada
Chagalamarri
Rudravaram

== Members of the Legislative Assembly ==
Year	Member	Political party
1962	Sitri Jayaraju	Indian National Congress
1967	Gangula Thimma Reddy	Independent
1972	Somula Venkat Subba Reddy	Independent
1978	Gangula Thimma Reddy	Independent
1980	Gangula Prathap Reddy	Indian National Congress
1983	Somula Venkat Subba Reddy	Telugu Desam Party
1985	Gangula Prathap Reddy	Indian National Congress
1989	Bhuma Sekhara Reddy	Telugu Desam Party
1994	Bhuma Nagi Reddy	Telugu Desam Party
1996	Shobha Nagi Reddy	Telugu Desam Party
1999	Shobha Nagi Reddy	Telugu Desam Party
2004	Gangula Prathap Reddy	Indian National Congress
2009	Shobha Nagi Reddy	Praja Rajyam Party
2012	Shobha Nagi Reddy	YSR Congress Party
2014	Shobha Nagi Reddy	YSR Congress Party
2014	Bhuma Akhila Priya	YSR Congress Party
2019	Gangula Brijendra Reddy (Gangula Nani)	YSR Congress Party
2024	Bhuma Akhila Priya	Telugu Desam Party

== Election results ==
=== 2004 ===
2004 Andhra Pradesh Legislative Assembly election: Allagadda
Party	Candidate	Votes	%	±%
INC	Gangula Prathap Reddy	67,596	52.97	+10.67
TDP	Bhuma Nagi Reddy	56,915	44.60	−10.08
Majority		10,681	8.37	
Turnout		127,607	73.10	+8.01
INC gain from TDP		Swing		

=== 2009 ===
2009 Andhra Pradesh Legislative Assembly election: Allagadda
Party	Candidate	Votes	%	±%
PRP	Shobha Nagi Reddy	61,555	40.01	
INC	Gangula Prathap Reddy	59,597	38.74	
TDP	Erigela Rampulla Reddy	23,800	15.47	
Majority		1,958	1.27	
PRP gain from INC		Swing		

=== 2012 ===
2012 Andhra Pradesh Legislative Assembly by-election: Allagadda
Party	Candidate	Votes	%	±%
YSRCP	Shobha Nagi Reddy	88,697		
TDP	Gangula Prathap Reddy	51,902		
Majority				
Turnout				
YSRCP gain from INC		Swing		

=== 2014 ===
2014 Andhra Pradesh Legislative Assembly election: Allagadda
Party	Candidate	Votes	%	±%
YSRCP	Shobha Nagi Reddy	92,108	53.46	
TDP	Gangula Prabhakara Reddy	74,180	43.06	
Majority		17,928	10.40	
Turnout		173,270	78.47	+1.81
YSRCP gain from PRP		Swing		

=== 2019 ===
2019 Andhra Pradesh Legislative Assembly election: Allagadda
Party	Candidate	Votes	%	±%
YSRCP	Gangula Brijendra Reddy (Nani)	105,905	57.03	
TDP	Bhuma Akhila Priya	70,292	37.85	
Majority		35,613	19.18	
Turnout		1,85,693		
YSRCP hold		Swing		

=== 2024 ===
2024 Andhra Pradesh Legislative Assembly election: Allagadda
Party	Candidate	Votes	%	±%
TDP	Bhuma Akhila Priya	98,881	49.93	
YSRCP	Gangula Brijendra Reddy (Nani)	86,844	43.85	
INC	Baragodla Hussain	6,100	3.08	
NOTA	None Of The Above	1,582	0.8	
Majority		12,037	6.08	
Turnout		1,98,052		
TDP gain from YSRCP		Swing		

== See also ==
- List of constituencies of Andhra Pradesh Legislative Assembly
