= Gowru Charitha Reddy =

Indian politician

Member of Legislative Assembly, Andhra Pradesh
- Incumbent
- Assumed office 2024
- Preceded by: Katasani Rambhupal Reddy
- Constituency: Panyam
- In office 2014–2019
- Preceded by: Katasani Rambhupal Reddy
- Succeeded by: Katasani Rambhupal Reddy
- Constituency: Panyam
- In office 2004–2009
- Preceded by: Byreddy Rajasekhara Reddy
- Succeeded by: Byreddy Rajasekhar Reddy
- Constituency: Nandikotkur

Personal details
- Born: 4 August 1971 (age 55) Konidela, Kurnool district, Andhra Pradesh, India
- Party: TDP (from 2019)
- Other political affiliations: YSRCP (until 2019)
- Spouse: Gowru Venkata Reddy
- Children: 2 (a son and a daughter)

Gowru Charitha Reddy (4 August 1971) is an Indian politician from Andhra Pradesh, India. She is a three time member of the Andhra Pradesh Legislative Assembly. She won the 2024 election from Panyam Assembly constituency representing the Telugu Desam Party.

== Early life and education ==
Reddy is from Panyam, Kurnool district, Andhra Pradesh. She married Gowru Venkata Reddy and together they have a son, Gowru Janardhan Reddy, and a daughter. She completed a BA in 1990 at Government Degree College, Nandikotkur, which is affiliated with Sri Krishnadevaraya University, Anantapur.

== Career ==
Reddy became an MLA for the first time winning the 2004 Andhra Pradesh Legislative Assembly election representing the Indian National Congress Party from Nandikotkur Assembly constituency which is reserved for Scheduled Caste community. She defeated her nearest rival Byreddy Rajasekhar Reddy, a two time MLA.

In 2014, she shifted to YSR Congress Party and was nominated to contest from Panyam Assembly constituency. She emerged victorious defeating her nearest rival Katasani Ramabhupal Reddy, a five time MLA, in the 2014 Andhra Pradesh Legislative Assembly election.

Before the 2019 Assembly elections, she quit the YSR Congress Party and joined the Telugu Desam Party as she was denied a ticket by the YSR Congress party. But she lost the seat to Katasani Ramabhupal Reddy, who represented the YSR Congress.

In 2024, she contested again on Telugu Desam Party ticket and won from Panyam Assembly constituency with a majority of over 40,000 votes against Katasani Rambhupal Reddy.
