= Githa Jayasurya =

Indian politician

Member of Legislative Assembly Andhra Pradesh
- Incumbent
- Assumed office 2024
- Preceded by: Thoguru Arthur
- Constituency: Nandikotkur

Personal details
- Party: Telugu Desam Party

Githa Jayasurya (born 1982) is an Indian politician from Andhra Pradesh. He is an MLA from Nandikotkur Assembly constituency which is reserved for SC community in Nandyal district. He represents Telugu Desam Party. He won the 2024 Andhra Pradesh Legislative Assembly election where TDP had an alliance with BJP and JSP.

== Early life and education ==
Jayasurya is from Nandikotkur, Nandyal district. His father Githa Gandhi is a farmer. His wife is an anganwadi teacher. He passed Class 12 in 2022 through National Open School, New Delhi.

== Political career ==
Jayasurya won the 2024 Andhra Pradesh Legislative Assembly election from Nandikotkur representing Telugu Desam Party. He polled 92,004 votes and defeated Dara Sudheer of YSR Congress Party by a margin of 9,792 votes.
