= Silpa Chakrapani Reddy =

Indian politician

- Born: 1965 (age 60–61); Atmakur
- Occupation: Politician
- Years active: 2014-present
- Political party: YSR Congress Party
- Father: Singareddy Chenna Reddy

Silpa Chakrapani Reddy (born 1964) is an Indian politician from Andhra Pradesh. He is an MLA of YSR Congress Party from Srisailam Assembly constituency in Kurnool district. He won the 2019 Andhra Pradesh Legislative Assembly election. He is nominated by YSRCP to contest the Srisailam seat in the 2024 Assembly Election.

== Early life and education ==
Reddy was born in Atmakur town, in the erstwhile Kurnool district, which is renamed as Nandyal district in 2022. His father's name is Singareddy Chenna Reddy. He completed intermediate, the pre university course, from Government Junior College, Koilkuntla, Kurnool district in 1982. He runs his own business.

== Career ==
He started his political career with Telugu Desam Party. He lost the 2014 Andhra pradesh Legislative Assembly election from Srisailam Assembly constituency on TDP ticket. Later, he was elected as MLC, but resigned the post and quit TDP. In 2017, he joined YSR Congress Party. He won the 2019 Andhra Pradesh Legislative Assembly election on YSRCP ticket defeating Budda Rajasekhara Reddy of Telugu Desam Party by a margin of 38,698 votes.
