= Pendekanti Law College =

- పెండేకంటి లా కాలేజ్
- Type: Public
- Established: 1991
- Parent institution: Vasavi Academy of Education
- Academic affiliations: Osmania University, Bar Council of India
- Principal: Dr.P.Aravinda
- Academic staff: 13
- Administrative staff: 20
- Students: 600
- Undergraduates: 300 (5YDC) & 720 (3YDC)
- Postgraduates: 360 (3YDC) + 60 (LLM)
- Location: No. 1-1-338 To 342, Street No. 6, Viveknagar, Chikkadpally0, Hyderabad, Telangana, 500020, India; 17.4053311°N 78.4941979°E
- Campus: Urban
- Colors: White and Magenta
- Website: www.plchyd.ac.in

- Location in Telangana Pendekanti Law College (India)

Pendekanti Law College was founded in 1991 by Pendekanti Venkatasubbaiah, former Governor to the state of Bihar and Karnataka. It is affiliated with Osmania University, India's 7th oldest university (1918). The school initially occupied a three-floor building in Himayatnagar.

The college now occupies a five-storey building at Viveknagar, Chikkadpally, Hyderabad.

== History ==
Pendekanti Law College was established by Vasavi Academy of Education and was formally inaugurated on 13 April 1991 by the then Chief Justice of India, Hon'ble Justice Ranganadha Misra, with the then governor of Andhra Pradesh, Krishna Kanth as the chief guest.

The college started with a three-year LL.B Evening Course in the first year 1990–1991, from the Second Year onwards the college introduced a 3-year LL.B Day Course, 5-year LL.B Course intended for the benefit of Post-Intermediate students. The college at present has two sections of 80 students each of three-year LL.B Course and one section of 80 students of 5-year LL.B course.

For first time in the State of Andhra Pradesh, six foreign students sponsored by Indian Council for Culture Relations, Govt. of India, took admission in the first year of the five-year LL.B. course for the academic year 2002–2003.

The academy has acquired land at Chikkadpally, Hyderabad for the construction of the building for the Pendekanti Law College. It was proposed to start the construction of the building in September 2002.

Due to the dedicated efforts for over a decade, Pendekanti Law College has emerged as the centre of excellence in qualitative legal education and strives to maintain its pre-eminent position.

== Awards ==
The college awards one Medal each to the toppers in the three-year and five-year LL.B course, in memory of the founder, Pendekanti. Another Gold Medal was instituted in 2000 by the family members of V. Lakshmi Devi, advocate, in her memory to be awarded to a student who secures First Class with highest marks in Contract 1 & II in three- and five-year course. The family of R.V. Rama Murthy instituted a prize in his memory to be awarded to the student who passes LL. B in first attempt with highest marks in Family Law I & II among three- and five-year law students. In addition incentives like merit certificates, book prizes to year-wise and subject-wise toppers are presented.

In 2001, students of the college secured the 1st rank in the Osmania University in three-year and five-year LL. B. courses.

== Library ==
The college has a well-equipped library with nearly 5000 books and, in addition, there is a series of All India Reporter for 70 years from 1930 and other journals numbering 1260. The college subscribes to 18 law journals including Modern Law Review besides newspapers and magazines of a general nature. Multiple copies of prescribed and the other useful books in the subjects of study are made available to the students. The library has two full-time qualified librarians.

== Faculty ==
The college has 11 full-time members of faculty, selected by a duly constituted committee of experts as per the rules of the university.

== Student life ==
Pendekanti Law College has been conducting regular Moot Courts at the college and Regional Levels. The college also conducts the Pendekanti Venkatasubbaiah Memorial South India Moot Court competitions.

The college team was adjudged as the Best Team at the 11th All India Moot Court Competition held at Ernakulam in March 2001 and won the Team Championship. Kaumudi Goda a student of 5/5 won the Best Student Advocate of India award as well as the Best Women Student Advocate of India award. The other members of the team were D. Suyodan and Syed Tousif Basha.

Srivalli Indrani student of 5/5 has represented the college in chess at various University, State and National level tournaments. Chandrasekhar student of 5/5 have represented in Cricket at Inter University tournament.

== Publications ==
College management started a student magazine LEX Visio

=== Governing body ===
- Sri. P.Ramamohan Rao - President
- Prof. T.V.Subba Rao - Vice-President
- Sri M.Krishna Murthy - Secretary
- Sri V.M.Parthasarathi - Treasurer
- Sri K.Ashok Kumar - Member
- Sri P.Balaji, - Member
- Sri P.Gouri Prasad - Member
- Sri P.Indrani - Member
- Prof. T.Revathy - Member
- Prof. Dr. V.Srinivasulu - Member
- Sri L.Subba Gurumurthy - Member

== See also ==
- Education in India
- Literacy in India
- List of institutions of higher education in Telangana
