= Byreddy Shabari =

Indian politician

Dr.Byreddy Shabari

Member of Parliament, Lok Sabha
- Incumbent
- Assumed office 2024
- Preceded by: Pocha Brahmananda Reddy
- Constituency: Nandyal

Personal details
- Party: Telugu Desam Party
- Spouse: P. Siva Charan Reddy
- Parent: Byreddy Rajasekhar Reddy
- Education: Dr. NTR University of Health Sciences
- Occupation: Radiologist; Politician

Byreddy Shabari is an Indian politician from Andhra Pradesh. She was elected to the 18th Lok Sabha from Nandyal Lok Sabha constituency in Nandyal district representing Telugu Desam Party. She won the 2024 Indian general election in Andhra Pradesh with a margin of 111,975 votes.

== Family and education ==
Dr.Shabari is the daughter of Byreddy Rajasekhar Reddy and granddaughter of three-time TDP MLA Byreddy Seshasayana Reddy. She is a Radiologist .

== See also ==
- 18th Lok Sabha
