= Katasani Rambhupal Reddy =

Indian politician

Member of Legislative Assembly Andhra Pradesh
- In office 2019–2024
- Preceded by: Gowru Charitha Reddy
- Succeeded by: Gowru Charitha Reddy
- Constituency: Panyam
- In office 2004–2014
- Preceded by: Bijjam Parthasarathy Reddy
- Succeeded by: Gowru Charitha Reddy
- Constituency: Panyam
- In office 1985–1999
- Preceded by: Challa Ramkrishna Reddy
- Succeeded by: Bijjam Parthasarathy Reddy
- Constituency: Panyam

Katasani Rambhupal Reddy (born 1968) is an Indian politician from Andhra Pradesh. He is an MLA of YSR Congress Party from Panyam Assembly constituency in Kurnool district. He won the 2019 Andhra Pradesh Legislative Assembly election. Earlier, he won the Assembly elections in 1985, 1989, 1994, 2004 and 2009 to become a six-time MLA from Panyam. He has been nominated again to contest the 2024 Assembly election from Panyam but lost to Gowru Charitha Reddy.

== Early life and education ==
He was born in Panyam. His father Narasimha Reddy is a farmer. He did his intermediate, the two year pre university course in Andhra Pradesh.

== Career ==
He started his political career in 1984 with Indian National Congress. He won the 1985 Andhra Pradesh Legislative Assembly election winning the Panyam Assembly constituency on Congress ticket. Later, he won the Panyam seat again winning the 1989 and 1994 Andhra Pradesh Legislative Assembly elections. He regained the seat in 2004 and won again in 2009 for a record fifth time. In March 2017, he joined TDP. He was also the TTD temple board trust member. He won for the sixth time in 2019 election.
