= G. Prathap Reddy =

Indian politician

Gangula Prathapa Reddy

Member of Parliament, Lok Sabha
- In office 1991–1991
- Preceded by: Bojja Venkata Reddy
- Succeeded by: P. V. Narasimha Rao
- Constituency: Nandyal, Andhra Pradesh

Member of Legislative Assembly Andhra Pradesh
- In office 2004–2009
- Preceded by: Shobha Nagi Reddy
- Succeeded by: Shobha Nagi Reddy
- Constituency: Allagadda
- In office 1985–1989
- Preceded by: Somula Venkat Subba Reddy
- Succeeded by: Bhuma Sekhara Reddy
- Constituency: Allagadda
- In office 1980–1983
- Preceded by: Gangula Thimma Reddy
- Succeeded by: Somula Venkat Subba Reddy
- Constituency: Allagadda

Personal details
- Born: 1 July 1950 (age 75) Yeragudidinne, Kurnool District, Madras State (present-day Andhra Pradesh)
- Party: Indian National Congress (1980 - 2017)
- Other political affiliations: Bharatiya Janata Party (2019- present),Telugu Desam Party (2017-2019)
- Spouse: Chandralekha
- Children: Gangula Phani Krishna Reddy Gangula Bharath Reddy
- Parent: Gangula Thimma Reddy (father)

Gangula Prathapa Reddy is an Indian politician. He was elected to the Lok Sabha, the lower house of the Parliament of India from Nandyal in Andhra Pradesh as a member of the Indian National Congress in 1991. But he resigned the seat to enable the then Prime Minister P. V. Narasimha Rao to contest a by election and get elected to parliament. He joined the Bharatiya Janata Party in 2019.
