= Dornipadu =

- village
- Interactive map of Dornipadu
- Location in Andhra Pradesh, India
- Coordinates: 15°14′14″N 78°26′54″E
- Country: India
- State: Andhra Pradesh
- District: Nandyal
- Talukas: Allagadda

Languages
  - Official: Telugu
- Time zone: UTC+5:30 (IST)
- Postal code: 518135
- Vehicle registration: AP

Dornipadu is a village in Dornipadu mandal, located in Nandyal district of the Indian state of Andhra Pradesh.
