= Bojja Venkata Reddy =

Indian politician (born 1932)

Member of Parliament, Lok Sabha
- In office 1989–1991
- Preceded by: Maddur Subba Reddy
- Succeeded by: Gangula Prathapa Reddy
- Constituency: Nandyal, Andhra Pradesh

Personal details
- Born: 1 July 1932 Pulimaddi, Kurnool District, Madras Presidency, British India(present-day Andhra Pradesh, India)
- Party: Indian National Congress
- Other political affiliations: Independent, Janata Party
- Spouse: Siva Sankaramma
- Children: 5 sons and 1 Daughter
- Education: Pachaiyappa's College, Madras Law College

Bojja Venkata Reddy (born 1 July 1932) is an Indian politician. He was elected to the Lok Sabha, the lower house of the Parliament of India from the Nandyal in Andhra Pradesh as a member of the Indian National Congress. Prior to this Sri Bojja Venkata Reddy was elected to Andhra Pradesh state legislative assembly in 1972, 1978, he was very instrumental in bringing P. V. Narasimha Rao to Nandyal and making him contest for member of Parliament when P. V. Narasimha was in office as Prime Minister of India. Later Reddy became the National Seeds Corporation Chairman from 1993 to 1997.
