= Allagadda =

Allagadda Avulagadda
- Town
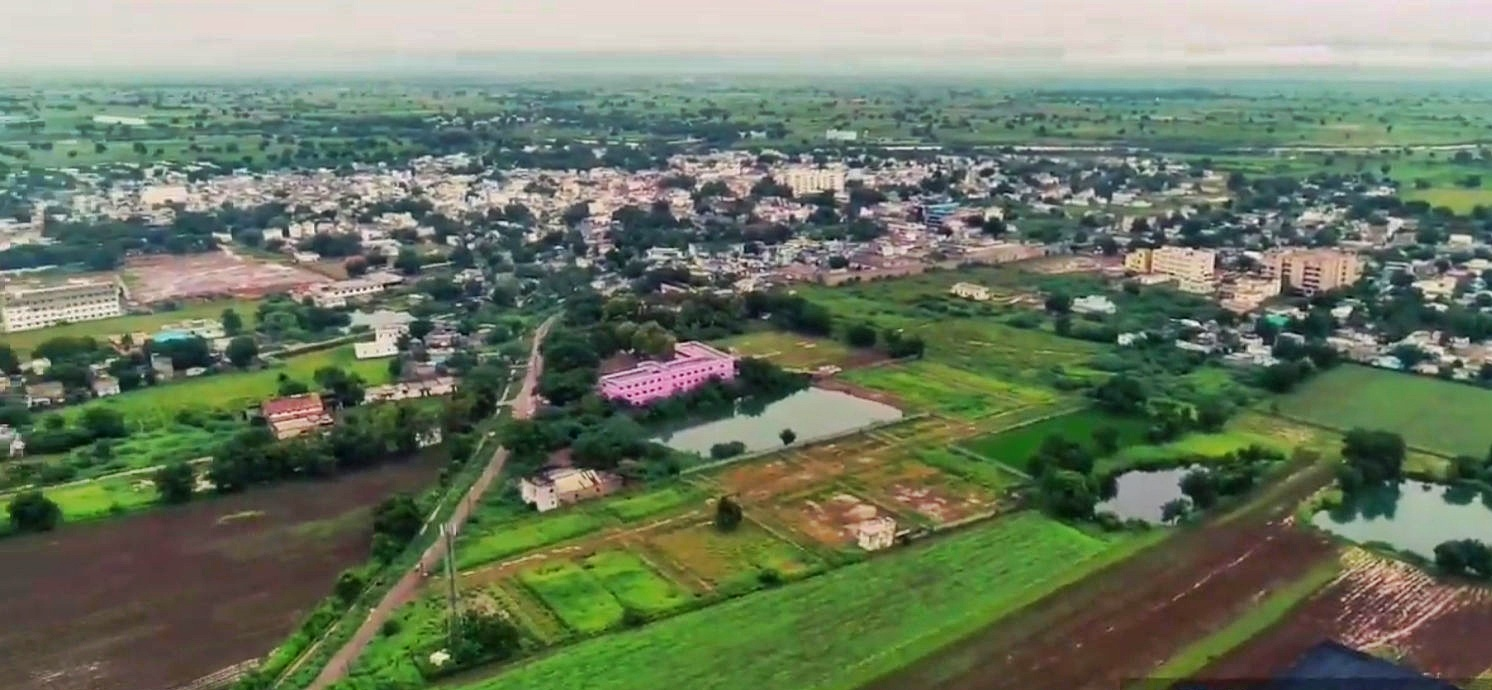
- Allagadda Town

- Location in Andhra Pradesh, India
- Coordinates: 15.1336°N 78.4975°E
- Country: India
- State: Andhra Pradesh
- District: Nandyal
- Incorporated (Town Council): 2011
- Named for: Cows(Avulu)

Government
  - Type: Municipality
  - Body: None
  - MP: byreddy shabari (Nandyal Parliament Constituency)
  - MLA: bhuma akhilapriya

Area
  - Total: 53.28 km^{2} (20.57 sq mi)
- Elevation: 166.5 m (546 ft)

Population (2011)
  - Total: 42,545
  - Rank: 5th in Nandyal District
  - Density: 798.5/km^{2} (2,068/sq mi)

Languages
  - Official: Telugu
  - Literacy: 83.43%
- Time zone: UTC+5:30 (IST)
- Postal code: 518 543
- Vehicle registration: AP 39
- Sex ratio (2011): 1009 ♀/1000 ♂

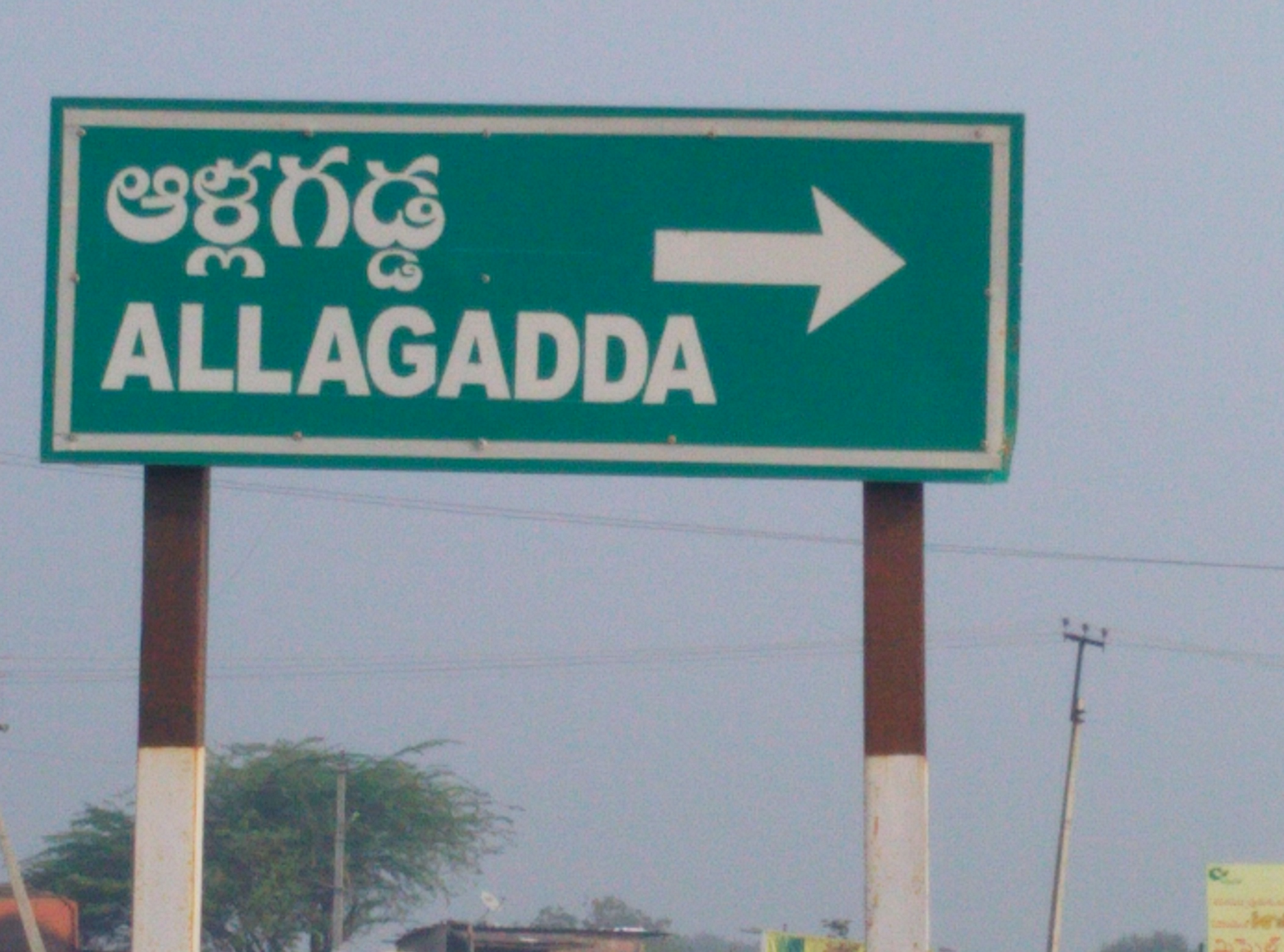
Signboard with directions to Allagadda

Allagadda is a town in Nandyal district of the Indian state of Andhra Pradesh. It is located in Nandyal Revenue division. The town is located at 15°08′00″N 78°31′00″E.

Allagadda is the headquarters of the Mandal and the Revenue Division. It has an extent of 62.30 km^{2}.

The town is 118 km from Kurnool and 42 km from Nandyal on National Highway 40, and 30 km from Ahobilam. The town lies on the border of the districts Kurnool and Kadapa.

Allagadda is famous for stone carving, also ahobilam temple. Ahobilam, located near Allagadda, is a significant pilgrimage site for devotees of Lord Narasimha, the lion-headed avatar of Vishnu. It's known for the nine self-manifested (Swayambhu) temples of Lord Narasimha, each representing a different form and aspect of the deity.

== Politics ==
During the 2024 election, BHUMA AKHILA PRIYA (MLA) was elected as the Member of the Legislative Assembly (MLA) for the Allagadda Assembly Constituency.

Allagadda Town Council is the fifth largest Urban Local Body in the erstwhile Kurnool district of Andhra Pradesh; the Town Council was established in the year 2011.

In April 2022, the Government of Andhra Pradesh created a new District, with Nandyal as the district and district headquarters. Allagadda was merged with Nandyal District.

== Transport ==
The Andhra Pradesh State Road Transport Corporation operates bus services from allagadda Depot. The nearest railway station Nandyal Junction (NDL) is 38 km away from the town. Kurnool airport is 95.2 km distance, and kadapa airport is 82.4 km away from Allagadda.

== History ==
The history of Allagadda dates back to the second century BCE. The evidence from the Archaeological Survey of India suggests that it was started during the Mourya Empire and Satavahana dynasty. Since then the town has been under the rule of numerous dynasties including Chalukya, Cholas, and Pallava.

From 1336 to 1647, Allagadda was under the Vijayanagara kingdom during this time many temples were built by Vijayanagara kings.

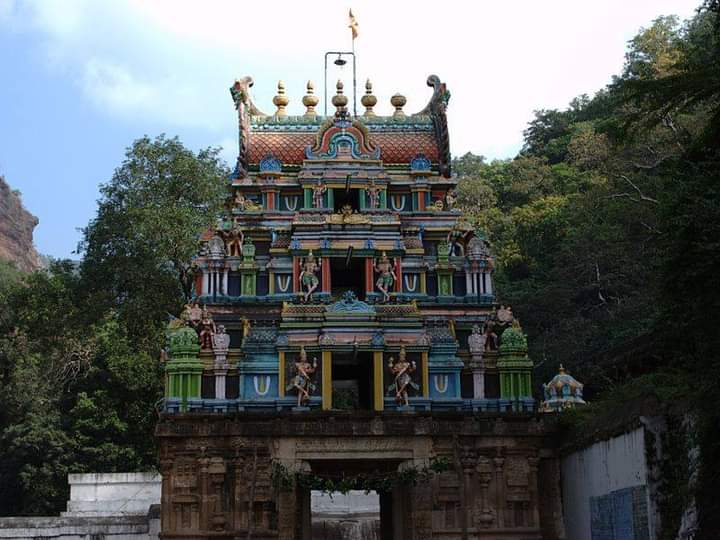
Upper ahobilam temple

Upper Ahobillam Temple was built between the 14th century and 16th century CE.

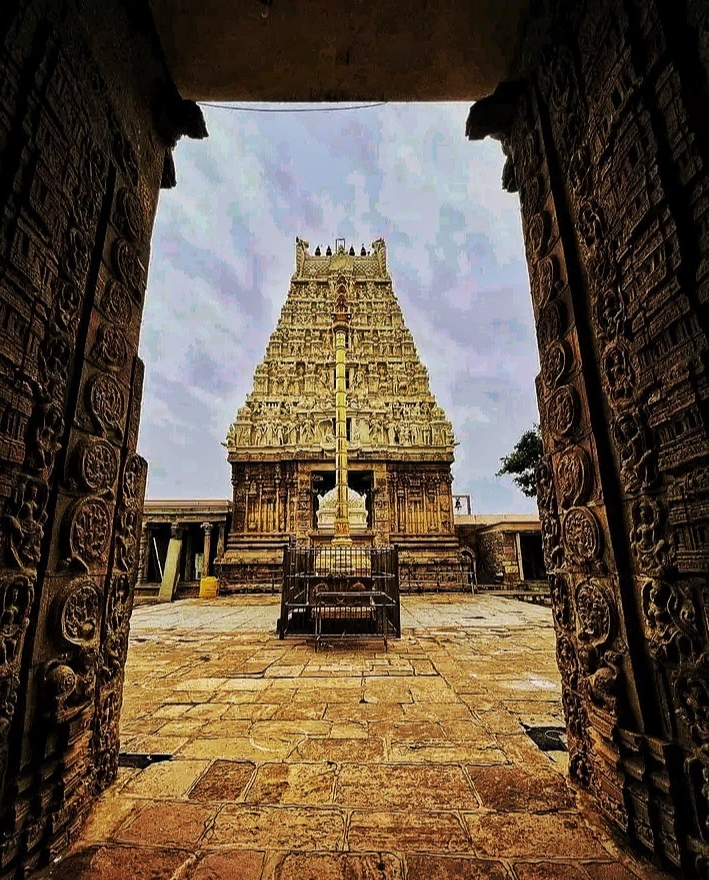
Ahobilam near allagadda.

Between 1746 and 1799 Allagadda was under the Bijapur Nawabs ruling independently. Following the Treaty of Seringapatam the Tippu Sultan agreed to give his northern territory to the Nizam of Hyderabad in 1792. In 1796, the then Nizam Asaf Jah II, harassed by the Marathas and Tipu Sultan, opted to get British military protection under Lord Wellesley's doctrine of Subsidiary Alliance. As a part of this agreement, the Nizam ceded a large portion of the acquired territory to the British, to be added to the Madras Presidency.

Allagadda came under the direct control of the British as part of the Ceded Districts in 1800, and merged with Cuddapah District in 1801. Later it was merged with the Kurnool district when Kurnool came under British control from the last nawab of Kurnool on 12 July 1840.
