= Pendekanti Venkatasubbaiah =

Indian politician (1921–1993)

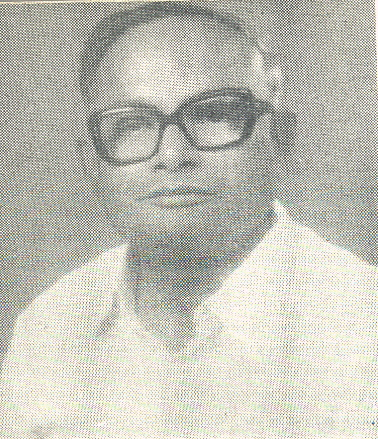

10th Governor of Karnataka
- In office 26 February 1988 – 5 February 1990
- Chief Minister: Ramakrishna Hegde; S. R. Bommai; Veerendra Patil
- Preceded by: Ashoknath Banerji
- Succeeded by: Bhanu Pratap Singh

11th Governor of Bihar
- In office 15 March 1985 – 25 February 1988
- Chief Minister: Bindeshwari Dubey; Bhagwat Jha Azad
- Preceded by: Akhlaqur Rahman Kidwai
- Succeeded by: Govind Narain Singh

Union Minister of State for Parliamentary Affairs
- In office 16 January 1980 – 2 September 1982 Serving with Sitaram Kesri
- Prime Minister: Indira Gandhi
- Preceded by: Larang Sai; Ram Kripal Sinha
- Succeeded by: H. K. L. Bhagat

Union Minister of State for Home Affairs
- In office 4 November 1984 – 31 December 1984 Serving with Ram Dulari Sinha
- Prime Minister: Rajiv Gandhi
- Preceded by: Himself
- Succeeded by: Ram Dulari Sinha
- In office 14 January 1980 – 31 October 1984 Serving with Yogendra Makwana; Nihar Ranjan Laskar; Ram Dulari Sinha
- Prime Minister: Indira Gandhi
- Preceded by: Dhanik Lal Mandal
- Succeeded by: Himself

Member of Parliament, Lok Sabha
- In office 1977 (Note: Bye election)–1984
- Preceded by: Neelam Sanjiva Reddy
- Succeeded by: Maddur Subba Reddy
- Constituency: Nandyal, Andhra Pradesh
- In office 1967–1977
- Preceded by: Constituency didn't exist between 1957 and 1967
- Succeeded by: Neelam Sanjiva Reddy
- Constituency: Nandyal, Andhra Pradesh
- In office 1957–1967
- Preceded by: Constituency established
- Succeeded by: Constituency abolished
- Constituency: Adoni, Andhra Pradesh

Member of Madras Legislative Assembly
- In office 1949–1952

Personal details
- Born: 18 June 1921 Sanjamala, Koilkuntla, Kurnool District, Madras Presidency, British India (Now Andhra Pradesh, India)
- Died: 12 October 1993 (aged 72) Hyderabad, India
- Party: Indian National Congress
- Spouse: Kanakamma

Pendekanti Venkatasubbaiah (18 June 1921 – 12 October 1993) was an Indian politician. He was the Governor of Bihar from 15 March 1985 to 25 February 1988 and the Governor of Karnataka, India from 26 February 1988 to 5 February 1990. He was elected to the Lok Sabha and was the Union Minister of State for Home and Parliamentary Affairs in both Indira Gandhi and Rajiv Gandhi cabinet.

== Life and career ==
Pendekanti Venkatasubbaiah was born on 18 June 1921 into an affluent family of agriculturists at Sanjamala, a village in the erstwhile Princely State of Banaganapalli in Madras Presidency, British India.

Venkatasubbaiah founded the Vasavi Academy of Education, an organisation which runs several educational institutions including the Vasavi College of Engineering, Pendekanti Law College, and Vasavi High School.

Venkatasubbaiah died in Hyderabad on 12 October 1993, at the age of 72.

== See also ==
- List of governors of Karnataka
- List of governors of Bihar
