= Bhuma Akhila Priya =

Indian politician

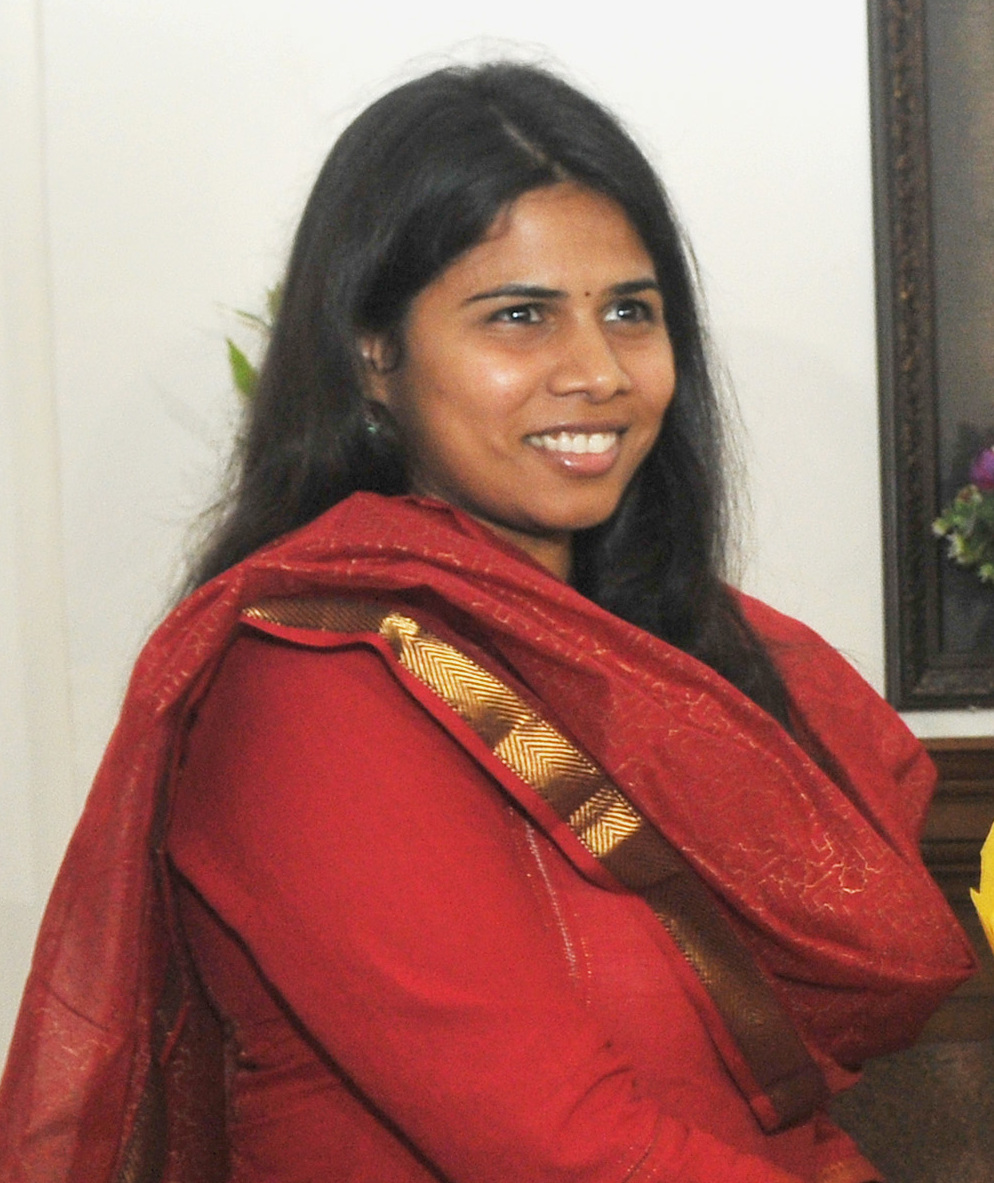

Member of Legislative Assembly Andhra Pradesh
- Incumbent
- Assumed office 2024
- Chief Minister: N. Chandrababu Naidu
- Preceded by: Gangula Brijendra Reddy (Gangula Nani)
- Constituency: Allagadda
- In office 2014–2019
- Chief Minister: N. Chandrababu Naidu
- Preceded by: Bhuma Shobha Nagi Reddy
- Succeeded by: Gangula Brijendra Reddy (Gangula Nani)
- Constituency: Allagadda

Minister for Tourism, Telugu Language and Culture Government of Andhra Pradesh
- In office 2 April 2017 – 29 May 2019
- Governor: E. S. L. Narasimhan
- Chief Minister: N. Chandrababu Naidu
- Succeeded by: Muttamsetti Srinivasa Rao

Personal details
- Born: 2 April 1987
- Party: Telugu Desam Party (since 2016)
- Other political affiliations: YSR Congress Party (until 2016)
- Parents: Bhuma Nagi Reddy (father); Bhuma Shobha Nagi Reddy (mother)
- Relatives: Bhuma Brahmananda Reddy (Cousin)

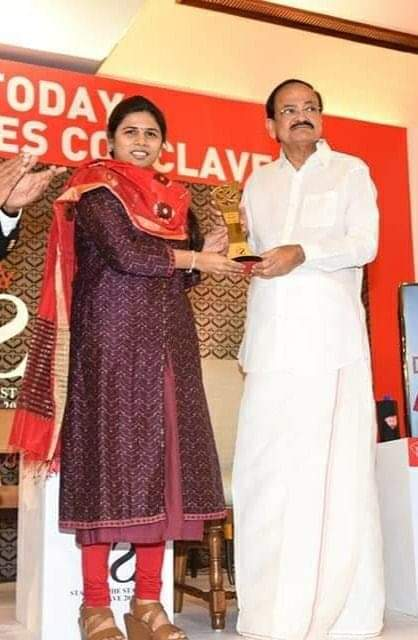
bhuma akhila priya

Bhuma Akhila Priya (born 2 April 1987) is an Indian politician from Andhra Pradesh. She is the former Tourism and Culture minister of Andhra Pradesh. She is currently the member of legislative assembly (MLA) from Allagadda assembly constituency (Telugu Desam Party).

== Early life ==
Akhila Priya was born to Bhuma Nagi Reddy and Shobha Nagi Reddy in Allagadda, Kurnool District, Andhra Pradesh. She is the eldest of three children. In 2014, she had to contest the Allagadda by-election which fell vacant due to the death of her mother in a road accident. She was unanimously elected representing the YSR Congress Party. In 2018, she married industrialist Bharghava Ram.

== Political career ==
In 2014, she won as a Member of the Legislative Assembly from the Allagadda assembly constituency by-election representing YSR Congress Party.

Later in 2016, she joined Telugu Desam Party along with her father Bhuma Nagi Reddy and served as the Minister for Tourism, Telugu Language and Culture under the Telugu Desam Party government. In 2019, she contested from Allagadda assembly constituency from Telugu Desam Party and lost the election to Gangula Bijendra Reddy of YSR Congress Party. In 2024, she was again elected as a member of the legislative assembly.
