= Silpa Mohan Reddy =

Indian politician

Minister for Housing, Andhra Pradesh
- In office 2004–2009

Member of Legislative Assembly Andhra Pradesh
- In office 2004–2014
- Chief Minister: Y.S Rajasekhar Reddy
- Preceded by: N.M.D Farooq
- Succeeded by: Bhuma Nagi Reddy
- Constituency: Nandyal Assembly constituency

Personal details
- Born: January 10, 1960 Nandyal, Nandyal district
- Party: YSR Congress party
- Other political affiliations: Indian National Congress party, Telugu Desam party
- Spouse: Ramadevi

Silpa Mohan Reddy is the ex-Minister for Housing in the Government of Andhra Pradesh, India. He has been elected a MLA from Nandyal constituency twice.

== Politics ==
Reddy was once named a board member of NG Ranga Agricultural University. He has received the National Citizens Award from the Indian central government, being honoured along with Mother Teresa. He later joined the Congress party of India. In the 2000 Indian municipal elections, Reddy was denied a spot on the ticket.

Between 2000 and 2004, Reddy participated in several protests with farmers. He also became the honorary president of Nandi Raithu Samakhya. In 2003, he fought for the release of irrigation water from Srisailam Reservoir. In the 2004 Assembly elections, Reddy received a place on the Congress Party ticket, subsequently winning by 49,500 votes over then-TDP minister N. M. D. Farooq. In the 2009 elections, he won by a 32,000-vote margin over Subba Reddy (no relation). Silpa Reddy was then named Minister of Housing.

Besides his career in politics, Reddy is also the co-founder of Silpa Real Estate with his brother Silpa Chakrapani Reddy. This company seeks to help the poor with no-interest financing.

Silpa Mohan Reddy contested from Congress party and won the Nandyal seat in the 2004 and 2009 elections. In 2014, he contested from TDP and lost to Bhuma Nagi Reddy. Mohan Reddy defected from the TDP and joined YSRCP in presence of party chief Y. S. Jagan Mohan Reddy in Hyderabad, on June 14, 2017, and contested Nandyal Assembly byelection held in 2017.
