= List of Reddys =

People with the Indian surname Reddy

This is a list of notable people who belong to the Hindu Reddy caste.

The origin of the Reddy caste has been linked to the Rashtrakutas by historians. They were feudal overlords and landed gentry. Historically and traditionally they have been the land-owning aristocracy of the Telugu land. Their prowess as rulers and warriors is well documented in Telugu history. The Reddy Kingdom (1325–1448 CE) ruled Kosta Andhra and Rayalaseema for over 120 years.

Today they continue to be a politically and socio-economically dominant group in South India especially in the Telugu states of Andhra Pradesh and Telangana.

== Reddys in Modern Era ==
A list of notable people who belong to Reddy caste. Following Reddy personalities who contributed to Indian society from the times of Kakatiyas to Post Independence.

Reddys have made significant contributions to India in the post-independence era, particularly in politics, state administration, and social development, with a strong presence in Andhra Pradesh, Telangana, and Karnataka. Key contributions include holding high constitutional offices, leading the formation of modern states, driving infrastructure and agricultural development, and participating in social movements.

== Kings, Queens and Warlords ==
- Recharla Rudra Reddy
- Gona Ganna Reddy
- Gona Budda Reddy
- Uyyalawada Narasimha Reddy
- Prolaya Vema Reddy
- Anavota Reddy
- Anavema Reddy
- Kumaragiri Reddy
- Kataya Vema Reddy
- Pedda Komati Vema Reddy
- Racha Vema Reddy
- Alladi Reddy
- Raja Veera Krishna Reddy
- Raja Rameshwar Rao I
- Raja Bahiri Gopal Rao
- Raja Somashekara Ananda Bhupala Reddy
- Raja Janumpally Rameshwar Rao
- Raja Sadashiva Reddy
- Raja Narasimha Reddy
- Maharani Shankarmma
- Maharani Adhilaxmi Devamma
- Rani Janakibai
- Rani Lingayamma
- Rani Janamma

== Freedom Fighters ==
- Uyyalawada Narasimha Reddy
- A. Subbarayalu Reddiar
- Omandur Periyavalavu Ramasamy Reddiyar
- Arutla Ramchandra Reddy
- V. Venkatasubba Reddiar
- B. V. Subba Reddy
- K. S. Venkatakrishna Reddiar
- Baddam Yella Reddy
- Bhimreddy Narasimha Reddy
- Budda Vengal Reddy
- Chandra Pulla Reddy
- Enuga Sreenivasulu Reddy
- P. Narsa Reddy
- Ravi Narayana Reddy
- Suravaram Pratapa Reddy
- Neelam Sanjiva Reddy
- Cattamanchi Gopala Krishnamoorthy Reddy

== President of India ==
- Neelam Sanjiva Reddy

Reddy served as the 6th President of India (1977 1982). He was born in Andhra Pradesh.

== Governors ==
#	Governor (Native of)	Order	State	Term of the office		
#	Governor (Native of)	Order	State	Term start	Term end	Duration
1	Palagani Chandra Reddy (SPSR Nellore)	(Acting)	Madras State	24 November 1964	7 December 1965	1 year, 13 days
2	Kyasamballi Chengalaraya Reddy (Kolar)	3rd	Madhya Pradesh	11 February 1965	2 February 1966	356 days
2	Kyasamballi Chengalaraya Reddy (Kolar)	3rd	Madhya Pradesh	10 February 1966	7 March 1971	5 years, 25 days
3	Bezawada Gopala Reddy (SPSR Nellore)	6th	Uttar Pradesh	1 May 1967	30 June 1972	5 years, 60 days
4	Marri Chenna Reddy (Ranga Reddy)	8th	Uttar Pradesh	25 October 1974	1 October 1977	2 years, 341 days
4	Marri Chenna Reddy (Ranga Reddy)	14th	Punjab	21 April 1982	6 February 1983	291 days
4	Marri Chenna Reddy (Ranga Reddy)	23rd	Rajasthan	5 February 1992	30 May 1993	1 year, 114 days
4	Marri Chenna Reddy (Ranga Reddy)	10th	Tamil Nadu	31 May 1993	2 December 1996	3 years, 185 days
5	S. Obul Reddy (Anantapuram)	6th	Andhra Pradesh	25 January 1975	10 January 1976	350 days
6	Konda Madhava Reddy (Nalgonda)	(Acting)	Maharashtra	16 April 1985	30 May 1985	44 days
7	Kasu Brahmananda Reddy (Palnadu)	14th	Maharashtra	20 February 1988	18 January 1990	1 year, 332 days
8	Kolli Venkata Raghunatha Reddy (SPSR Nellore)	6th	Tripura	12 February 1990	14 August 1993	3 years, 183 days
8	Kolli Venkata Raghunatha Reddy (SPSR Nellore)	6th	Manipur	20 March 1993	30 August 1993	163 days
8	Kolli Venkata Raghunatha Reddy (SPSR Nellore)	14th	West Bengal	14 August 1993	27 April 1998	4 years, 256 days
8	Kolli Venkata Raghunatha Reddy (SPSR Nellore)	(Additional charge)	Sikkim	12 November 1995	9 February 1996	89 days
8	Kolli Venkata Raghunatha Reddy (SPSR Nellore)	19th	Odisha	31 January 1997	12 February 1997	12 days
8	Kolli Venkata Raghunatha Reddy (SPSR Nellore)	19th	Odisha	31 December 1997	27 April 1998	117 days
9	Bheemireddy Satya Narayana Reddy (Mahabubnagar)	12th	Uttar Pradesh	12 February 1990	25 May 1993	3 years, 102 days
9	Bheemireddy Satya Narayana Reddy (Mahabubnagar)	26th	Odisha	1 June 1995	17 June 1997	2 years, 16 days
9	Bheemireddy Satya Narayana Reddy (Mahabubnagar)	(Additional Charge)	West Bengal	13 July 1993	14 August 1993	32 days
10	Nallu Indrasena Reddy (Ranga Reddy)	20th	Tripura	26 October 2023	Incumbent	3 years, 3 days

== Speaker of the Lok Sabha ==
- Neelam Sanjiva Reddy

Reddy served as the 4th Lok Sabha Speaker (1967–1969) & (1977) for two terms.

== Union Cabinet Ministers ==
#	Name	Portfolio	Term of the Office		Duration	Cabinet
#	Name	Portfolio	Start	End	Duration	Cabinet
1	Kyasamballi Chengalaraya Reddy	2nd Union Minister of Production	15 April 1952	16 April 1957	5 years, 1 day	Nehru II
1	Kyasamballi Chengalaraya Reddy	2nd Union Minister of Works, Housing & Supply	17 April 1957	4 April 1961	3 years, 352 days	Nehru III
1	Kyasamballi Chengalaraya Reddy	3rd Union Minister of Commerce & Industry	4 April 1961	19 July 1963	2 years, 106 days	Nehru IV
2	Bezawada Gopala Reddy	4th Union Minister of Information and Broadcasting	10 April 1962	31 August 1963	1 year, 143 days	Nehru IV
3	Neelam Sanjiva Reddy	3rd Union Minister of Steel	9 June 1964	24 January 1966	1 year, 216 days	Shastri
3	Neelam Sanjiva Reddy	5th Union Minister of Mines	11 January 1966	24 January 1966	13 days	Nanda II
3	Neelam Sanjiva Reddy	8th Union Minister of Transport & Aviation	24 January 1966	13 March 1967	1 year, 51 days	Indira I
4	Marri Chenna Reddy	5th Union Minister of Steel	16 March 1967	27 April 1968	1 year, 42 days	Indira II
4	Marri Chenna Reddy	7th Union Minister of Mines & Metals	16 March 1967	27 April 1968	1 year, 42 days	Indira II
5	K. V. Raghunatha Reddy	7th Minister of Company Affairs	20 June 1970	18 March 1971	2 years, 230 days	Indira II
5	K. V. Raghunatha Reddy	7th Minister of Company Affairs	18 March 1971	5 February 1973	1 year, 324 days	Indira III
6	Kasu Brahmananda Reddy	10th Union Minister of Communications; 11th Union Minister of Home Affairs	11 January 1974	10 October 1974	272 days	Indira III
6	Kasu Brahmananda Reddy	10th Union Minister of Communications; 11th Union Minister of Home Affairs	10 October 1974	24 March 1977	2 years, 165 days	Indira III
7	Kotla Vijaya Bhaskara Reddy	20th Union Minister of Shipping and Transport	2 February 1983	7 September 1984	1 year, 218 days	Indira IV
7	Kotla Vijaya Bhaskara Reddy	24th Union Minister of Industry	7 September 1984	31 October 1984	54 days	Indira IV
7	Kotla Vijaya Bhaskara Reddy	24th Union Minister of Industry	4 November 1984	31 December 1984	57 days	Rajiv I
7	Kotla Vijaya Bhaskara Reddy	18th Union Minister of Law, Justice and Company Affairs	21 June 1991	9 October 1992	1 year, 125 days	PVN Rao
8	Sudini Jaipal Reddy	23rd Union Minister of Information & Broadcasting	1 May 1997	19 March 1998	322 days	Gujral
8	Sudini Jaipal Reddy	23rd Union Minister of Information & Broadcasting	22 May 2004	18 November 2005	1 year, 180 days	Singh I
8	Sudini Jaipal Reddy	4th Union Minister of Culture	23 May 2004	29 January 2006	1 year, 251 days	Singh I
8	Sudini Jaipal Reddy	35th Union Minister of Urban Development	18 November 2005	25 May 2009	3 years, 188 days	Singh I
8	Sudini Jaipal Reddy	35th Union Minister of Urban Development	26 May 2009	19 January 2011	1 year, 238 days	Singh II
8	Sudini Jaipal Reddy	38th Union Minister of Petroleum & Natural Gas	19 January 2011	28 October 2012	1 year, 283 days	Singh II
8	Sudini Jaipal Reddy	6th Union Minister of Earth Sciences	19 October 2012	18 May 2014	1 year, 211 days	Singh II
8	Sudini Jaipal Reddy	17th Union Minister of Science and Technology	29 October 2012	18 May 2014	1 year, 201 days	Singh II
9	Gangapuram Kishan Reddy	34th Union Minister of Tourism	21 July 2021	9 June 2024	2 years, 324 days	Modi II
9	Gangapuram Kishan Reddy	12th Union Minister of Culture	21 July 2021	9 June 2024	2 years, 324 days	Modi II
9	Gangapuram Kishan Reddy	9th Union Minister of the Development of North Eastern Region	21 July 2021	9 June 2024	2 years, 324 days	Modi II
9	Gangapuram Kishan Reddy	25th Union Minister of Coal	10 June 2024	Incumbent	2 years, 141 days	Modi III
9	Gangapuram Kishan Reddy	45th Union Minister of Mines	10 June 2024	Incumbent	2 years, 141 days	Modi III

== Leader of the Opposition in Rajya Sabha ==
- Sudini Jaipal Reddy

Reddy served as the 7th Leader of the opposition in Rajya Sabha (1991–1992). He was born in Telangana.

== Chief Ministers ==
#	Chief Minister (Native of)	Order	State / Union Territory	Term of the Office		
#	Chief Minister (Native of)	Order	State / Union Territory	Start	End	Duration
1	Agaram Subbarayalu Reddiar (South Arcot)	1st	Madras Presidency	17 December 1920	11 July 1921	206 days
2	Omanthur Periyavalavu Ramaswamy Reddiyar (Tiruchirappalli)	10th	Madras Presidency	23 March 1947	6 April 1949	2 years, 14 days
3	Kyasamballi Chengalaraya Reddy (Kolar)	1st	Mysore State	25 October 1947	30 March 1952	4 years, 157 days
4	Bezawada Gopala Reddy (SPSR Nellore)	2nd	Andhra State	28 March 1955	1 November 1956	1 year, 218 days
5	Neelam Sanjiva Reddy (Anantapuram)	1st	Andhra Pradesh (Combined)	1 November 1956	11 January 1960	3 years, 71 days
5	Neelam Sanjiva Reddy (Anantapuram)	1st	Andhra Pradesh (Combined)	12 March 1962	20 February 1964	1 year, 345 days
6	Kasu Brahmananda Reddy (Palnadu)	3rd	Andhra Pradesh (Combined)	21 February 1964	30 September 1971	7 years, 221 days
7	V. Venkatasubba Reddiar (Coimbatore)	2nd	Puducherry	11 September 1964	8 April 1967	2 years, 209 days
7	V. Venkatasubba Reddiar (Coimbatore)	2nd	Puducherry	6 March 1968	17 September 1968	195 days
8	Marri Chenna Reddy (Ranga Reddy)	6th	Andhra Pradesh (Combined)	6 March 1978	10 October 1980	2 years, 218 days
8	Marri Chenna Reddy (Ranga Reddy)	6th	Andhra Pradesh (Combined)	3 December 1989	17 December 1990	1 year, 14 days
9	M. D. R. Ramachandran (Coimbatore)	5th	Puducherry	16 January 1980	23 June 1983	3 years, 158 days
9	M. D. R. Ramachandran (Coimbatore)	5th	Puducherry	8 March 1990	3 March 1991	360 days
10	Bhavanam Venkatarami Reddy (Palnadu)	8th	Andhra Pradesh (Combined)	24 February 1982	20 September 1982	208 days
11	Kotla Vijaya Bhaskara Reddy (Kurnool)	9th	Andhra Pradesh (Combined)	20 September 1982	9 January 1983	111 days
11	Kotla Vijaya Bhaskara Reddy (Kurnool)	9th	Andhra Pradesh (Combined)	9 October 1992	12 December 1994	2 years, 64 days
12	Nedurumalli Janardhana Reddy (Tirupati)	11th	Andhra Pradesh (Combined)	17 December 1990	9 October 1992	1 year, 297 days
13	V. Vaithilingam (Cuddalore)	6th	Puducherry	4 July 1991	13 May 1996	4 years, 314 days
13	V. Vaithilingam (Cuddalore)	6th	Puducherry	4 September 2008	15 May 2011	2 years, 253 days
14	Yeduguri Sandinti Rajasekhara Reddy (YSR Kadapa)	14th	Andhra Pradesh (Combined)	14 May 2004	20 May 2009	5 years, 6 days
14	Yeduguri Sandinti Rajasekhara Reddy (YSR Kadapa)	14th	Andhra Pradesh (Combined)	20 May 2009	2 September 2009	105 days
15	Nallari Kiran Kumar Reddy (Ranga Reddy)	16th	Andhra Pradesh (Combined)	25 November 2010	1 March 2014	3 years, 96 days
16	Yeduguri Sandinti Jagan Mohan Reddy (YSR Kadapa)	17th	Andhra Pradesh	30 May 2019	12 June 2024	5 years, 13 days
17	Anumula Revanth Reddy (Nagarkurnool)	2nd	Telangana	7 December 2023	Incumbent	2 years, 326 days

== Judges of Supreme Court ==
#	Name	Date of appointment	Date of retirement	Tenure length
1	Pingle Jaganmohan Reddy	1 August 1969	22 January 1975	5 years, 174 days
2	O. Chinnappa Reddy	17 July 1978	24 September 1987	9 years, 69 days
3	K. Jayachandra Reddy	11 January 1990	14 July 1994	4 years, 184 days
4	B.P. Jeevan Reddy	7 October 1991	13 March 1997	5 years, 157 days
5	P. Venkatarama Reddi	17 August 2001	9 August 2005	3 years, 357 days
6	B. Sudarshan Reddy	12 January 2007	7 July 2011	4 years, 176 days
7	Ramayyagari Subhash Reddy	2 November 2018	4 January 2022	3 years, 63 days

== Union Ministers of State ==
- Kotla Jayasurya Prakasha Reddy

27th Union Minister of State for Railways (2012–2014)

- T. Subbarami Reddy

Union Minister of State for Mines, (2006–2008)

- Napoleon

Union Minister of State for Ministry of Social Justice and Empowerment, (2009–2013)

- Gangapuram Kishan Reddy

Union Minister of State for Home Affairs (2019–2021)

== Governor of the Reserve Bank of India ==
Yaga Venugopal Reddy

Reddy is an IAS officer who served as the 21st Governor of RBI between 2003 and 2008. He was born in Andhra Pradesh.

== Chief Justices of High Courts ==
S. No.	Chief Justice	Date of Appointment	Date of Retirement	High Court
1	Justice Palagani Chandra Reddy	1958	1964	Andhra Pradesh High Court
1	Justice Palagani Chandra Reddy	15 February 1965	30 June 1966	Madras High Court
2	Justice P. Jagan Mohan Reddy	1966	1969	Andhra Pradesh High Court
3	Justice S. Obul Reddi	1974	6 July 1976	Andhra Pradesh High Court
3	Justice S. Obul Reddi	18 August 1977	1978	Andhra Pradesh High Court
3	Justice S. Obul Reddi	7 July 1976	18 August 1977	Gujarat High Court
4	Justice O. Chinnappa Reddy	28 June 1976	23 October 1976	Punjab and Haryana High Court
5	Justice Konda Madhava Reddy	1982	7 April 1984	Andhra Pradesh High Court
5	Justice Konda Madhava Reddy	8 April 1984	21 October 1985	Bombay High Court
6	Justice Palem Chennakesava Reddy	8 April 1984	29 September 1985	Andhra Pradesh High Court
6	Justice Palem Chennakesava Reddy	30 September 1985	11 November 1986	Gauhati High Court
7	Justice P. V. Reddi	21 October 2000	16 August 2001	Karnataka High Court
8	Justice B. Subhashan Reddy	12 September 2001	20 November 2004	Madras High Court
8	Justice B. Subhashan Reddy	21 November 2004	2 March 2005	Kerala High Court
8	Justice B. Subhashan Reddy	5 December 2005	12 January 2007	Manipur High Court
9	Justice L. Narasimha Reddy	2 January 2015	31 July 2015	Patna High Court
10	Justice Ramayyagari Subhash Reddy	12 February 2016	1 November 2018	Gujarat High Court

== Speakers of Legislative Assemblies/Councils ==
#	Name	Took office	Left office	Duration	House
1	Bezawada Ramachandra Reddy	October 1930	January 1937	6 years, 113 days	Madras Legislative Council
2	B. V. Subba Reddy	20 March 1962	29 September 1971	9 years, 193 days	Andhra Pradesh Legislative Assembly
3	K. V. Vema Reddy	25 November 1971	19 March 1972	115 days	Andhra Pradesh Legislative Assembly
4	Pidatala Ranga Reddy	15 July 1968	20 March 1972	3 years, 249 days	Andhra Pradesh Legislative Council
4	Pidatala Ranga Reddy	21 March 1972	25 September 1974	2 years, 188 days	Andhra Pradesh Legislative Assembly
5	R. Dasaratha Rami Reddy	28 January 1975	14 March 1978	3 years, 45 days	Andhra Pradesh Legislative Assembly
6	Agarala Eswara Reddi	24 February 1981	22 September 1981	210 days	Andhra Pradesh Legislative Assembly
6	Agarala Eswara Reddi	7 September 1982	16 January 1983	131 days	Andhra Pradesh Legislative Assembly
7	P. Ramachandra Reddy	4 January 1990	22 December 1990	265 days	Andhra Pradesh Legislative Assembly
8	K. R. Suresh Reddy	1 June 2004	3 June 2009	5 years, 2 days	Andhra Pradesh Legislative Assembly
9	Kiran Kumar Reddy	4 June 2009	24 November 2010	1 year, 173 days	Andhra Pradesh Legislative Assembly

== Civil Servants ==
- Raja Bahadur Venkatarama Reddy, Kotwal of Hyderabad (1920–1934)
- Gongireddi Raghava Reddy, IPS 1956 Batch
- Yaga Venugopal Reddy, IAS 1964 Batch
- Venambake Dinesh Reddy, IPS 1977 Batch
- Mudireddy Mahendar Reddy, IPS 1986 Batch
- Battula Shivadhar Reddy, IPS 1994 Batch

== Military Officers ==
- Kakatiya Military Chief Gona Budda Reddy
- Kakatiya Military Chief Gona Ganna Reddy
- Lieutenant General ARK Reddy
- Sepoy Maruprolu Jaswanth Kumar Reddy
- Squadron Leader Sindhu Reddy
- Lieutenant Colonel Palugulla Mastan Reddy
- Sapper Sangi Reddy Sanjeeva Reddy
- Captain Rapolu Veera Raja Reddy
- Lieutenant General GAV Reddy
- Lieutenant SDV Prasad Reddy

== Science-Technology-Engineer-Mathematics (STEM) ==
- Dabbala Rajagopal Reddy, Computer Scientist
- Solipuram Madhusudhan Reddy, Mycologist
- Prem Sagar Reddy, Cardiologist
- Kolli Srinath Reddy, Physician
- Bodanape Venkat Ram Mohan Reddy, Engineer
- Basani Vijayapal Reddy, Pediatrician
- Batmanathan Dayanand Reddy, Scientist
- Dumbala Srinivasa Reddy, Chemist
- Amulya Kumar N Reddy, Indian Scientist
- Junuthula N Reddy, Engineer
- Arjula Ramachandra Reddy, Biologist
- G. Satheesh Reddy, Aerospace Scientist
- Manjula Reddy, Bacterial Geneticist
- Gayatri Reddy, Anthropologist

== Poets, Writers and Teachers ==
- Gona Budda Reddy – 13th-century poet
- Vemana/Kumaragiri Vema Reddy – 14th-century poet
- Annamalai Reddiyar – 19th-century poet
- Cattamanchi Ramalinga Reddy, Poet & Teacher
- Suravaram Pratapareddy, poet & historian
- Gunapati Keshavaa Reddy, journalist
- G. Ram Reddy, professor
- Kethu Viswanatha Reddy, poet
- Keshava Reddy, novelist
- Mallemala Sundararami Reddy, poet & writer
- Nandini Sidda Reddy
- Rachapalem Chandrasekhara Reddy, Writer & Teacher
- Sunkireddy Narayana Reddy, poet
- Apsara Reddy, journalist

== Philanthropists ==
- Budda Vengal Reddy
- Vedire Ramachandra Reddy
- Gunampalli Pulla Reddy
- P Obul Reddy
- Sudha Reddy
- Tarimela Ramana Reddy

== Sports ==
- Proddaturi Akshath Reddy, Indian cricketer
- Ambati Prudhvi Reddy, basketball player
- Anindith Reddy, Indian racing driver
- Aruna Reddy, Indian gymnast
- Arundhati Reddy, Indian crickteter
- Ammana Ashish Reddy, Indian cricketer
- Bharath Reddy, Indian cricketer
- Buss Sumeeth Reddy, badminton player
- Gayatri Reddy, owner of the now-defunct Deccan Chargers franchise
- Harishankar Reddy, Indian cricketer
- Illuri Ajay Kumar Reddy, Indian blind cricketer
- Mandadi Abhirath Reddy, Indian cricketer
- N. Sikki Reddy, badminton player
- Neelapu Rami Reddy, sprinter and athletics champion
- Kaki Nitish Kumar Reddy, Indian cricketer
- Nirvetla Rishith Reddy, Indian cricketer
- Nallapureddy Shree Charani Reddy, Indian Cricketer
- Satwiksairaj Ranki Reddy, Indian badminton player
- Snehadevi Reddy, Indian tennis player

== Padma Awardees ==
=== Padma Vibhushan ===
#	Year	Name	Field	Remarks	Ref
1	1992	Raavi Narayan Reddy	Public Affairs	Feeedom Fighter; Communist Leader; Peasant Leader	
2	2010	Prathap Chandra Reddy	Trade & Industry	Founder of Apollo Hospitals; Architect of Modern Indian Healthcare	
3	2010	Yaga Venugopal Reddy	Public Affairs (IAS)	Indian Economist; 42nd Deputy Governor of RBI; 21st Governor of RBI	
4	2025	Duvvur Nageshwar Reddy	Medicine	Indian Gastroenterologist; Founder of AIG Hospitals	

=== Padma Bhushan ===
#	Year	Name	Field	Remarks
1	1956	Muthulakshmi Reddy	Medicine	Founder of Cancer Institute (WIA) & Social Reformer
2	1974	Bommireddy Narasimha Reddy	Arts	Film director, Producer and Screenwriter
3	1977	Perugu Siva Reddy	Medicine	Eye Surgeon & Ophthalmologist
4	1991	Prathap Chandra Reddy	Trade & Industry	Founder of Apollo Hospitals
5	1992	Cingireddy Narayana Reddy	Literature	Poet, Writer and Critic
6	2000	Radha Reddy	Arts	Dancing Couple, Gurus and Choreographares
7	2001	Dabbala Rajagopal Reddy	Sciences	Indian American Computer Scientist & AI Expert
8	2005	Koduru Ishwara Varaprasad Reddy	Sciences	Founder of Shantha Biotechnics
9	2005	Kolli Srinath Reddy	Medicine	Founder of Public Health Foundation of India
10	2011	Gunupati Venkata Krishna Reddy	Trade & Industry	Founder of GVK Industries
11	2011	Kallam Anji Reddy	Trade & Industry	Founder of Dr. Reddy's Laboratories
12	2016	Duvvur Nageshwar Reddy	Medicine	Indian Gastroenterologist

=== Padma Shri ===
#	Year	Name	Field	Remarks
1	1968	Smt Sudha Venkatasiva Reddy	Social work	Philanthropist
2	1969	N. Balakrishna Reddy	Social work	Philanthropist
3	1971	Devan Venkata Reddy	Trade & Industry	Entrepreneur
4	1972	Krishna Reddy	Arts	Print maker, Sculptor and Teacher
5	1977	C. Narayana Reddy	Literature	Poet, Writer and Critic
6	2000	Enuga Sreenivasulu Reddy	Public Affairs	Anti-Apartheid Advocate & Secretary at United Nations Special Committee against Apartheid (XVII)
7	2001	Kallam Anji Reddy	Trade & Industry	Founder of Dr. Reddy's Laboratories
8	2002	Duvvur Nageshwar Reddy	Medicine	Indian Gastroenterologist
9	2005	K. C. Reddy	Public Affairs (IPS)	Served as Chief Security Advisor of UNO
10	2009	A. Sankara Reddy	Literature	Principal of Sri Venkateswara College
11	2011	Anita Reddy	Social Work	Founder of DRIK DWARAKA Community
12	2012	T. Venkatapathi Reddiar	Florist	Known for Casuarina Cultivation & Horticultarist
13	2017	Bodanapu Venkata Ram Mohan Reddy	Trade & Industry	Founder of Cyient
14	2020	Chintala Venkat Reddy	Agriculture	Known for Organic farming
15	2022	Gaddam Padmaja Reddy	Arts	Kuchipudi Exponent & Music teacher
16	2023	Bandi Ramakrishna Reddy	Literature	Indian Linguist ; Known for his work on conservation of endangered languages including Kuvi, Manda, and Kui.
17	2026	Deepika Reddy	Arts	Classical Dancer, Choreographer and Dance teacher
18	2026	Palkonda Vijay Anand Reddy	Medicine	Indian Oncologist; Known for his contributions to the field of Cancer
19	2026	Mamidi Rama Reddy	Animal Husbandry	Service to the Dairy and Animal-rearing sectors

== Members of Parliament ==
=== House of Elders (Rajya Sabha) ===
#	Name (Native of)	Term of the Office		Duration	Term(s)	Note
#	Name (Native of)	Start	End	Duration	Term(s)	Note
1	M. Govind Reddy (Gadag)	3 April 1952	3 April 1956	4 years, 0 days	3	Created
1	M. Govind Reddy (Gadag)	3 April 1956	3 April 1962	6 years, 0 days	3	Re-Elected
1	M. Govind Reddy (Gadag)	3 April 1962	3 April 1968	6 years, 0 days	3	Retired
2	Puchalapalli Sundararami Reddy (Nellore)	3 April 1952	21 March 1955	2 years, 352 days	1	Resigned; Elected as MLA
3	Cattamanchi Gopala Krishnamoorthy Reddy (Kolar)	3 April 1952	3 April 1954	2 years, 0 days	1	Resigned
4	Neelam Sanjiva Reddy (Anantapur)	22 August 1952	15 September 1955	3 years, 24 days	3	Resigned; Become Deputy CM of newly formed Andhra
4	Neelam Sanjiva Reddy (Anantapur)	20 November 1964	2 April 1966	1 year, 352 days	3	For 2 Years
4	Neelam Sanjiva Reddy (Anantapur)	3 April 1966	24 February 1967	4 years, 327 days	3	Elected to Lok Sabha
5	K. Chengalaraya Reddy	9 October 1952	2 April 1954	3 years, 176 days	2	Former Chief Minister of Mysore State
5	K. Chengalaraya Reddy	3 April 1954	18 March 1957	1 year, 350 days	2	Elected to Lok Sabha
6	Adduru Balarami Reddy (Kurnool)	30 November 1953	30 November 1059	6 years, 0 days	2	Re-Elected
6	Adduru Balarami Reddy (Kurnool)	30 November 1959	9 March 1962	2 years, 99 days	2	Resigned; Elected as MLA
7	Yashoda Reddy (Kurnool)	15 February 1956	2 April 1962	6 years, 46 days	2	Elected to Lok Sabha
7	Yashoda Reddy (Kurnool)	3 April 1967	3 April 1972	5 years, 0 days	2	Retired
8	Nookala Narotham Reddy (Warangal)	2 April 1956	15 March 1960	3 years, 348 days	2	Re-Elected
8	Nookala Narotham Reddy (Warangal)	3 April 1962	3 April 1968	6 years, 0 days	2	Retired
9	Thimmareddy Annapurna Devi Reddy (Bidar)	3 April 1958	3 April 1964	6 years, 0 days	1	Retired
10	Mulka Govinda Reddy (Chitradurga)	3 April 1958	3 April 1964	6 years, 0 days	4	Re-Elected
10	Mulka Govinda Reddy (Chitradurga)	3 April 1964	3 April 1970	6 years, 0 days	4	Re-Elected
10	Mulka Govinda Reddy (Chitradurga)	3 April 1970	3 April 1976	6 years, 0 days	4	Re-Elected
10	Mulka Govinda Reddy (Chitradurga)	3 April 1976	3 April 1982	6 years, 0 days	4	Retired
11	Bezawada Gopala Reddy (Nellore)	18 August 1958	27 February 1962	3 years, 193 days	1	Elected to Lok Sabha
12	S. Channa Reddy (Mahabubnagar)	3 April 1958	3 April 1964	6 years, 0 days	1	Retired
13	J. C. Nagi Reddy (Anantapur)	3 April 1960	16 September 1964	4 years, 166 days	2	Elected
13	J. C. Nagi Reddy (Anantapur)	3 April 1966	3 April 1972	6 years, 0 days	2	Retired
14	N. Sri Rama Reddy (Chikballapur)	3 April 1960	3 April 1966	6 years, 0 days	1	Retired
15	Marri Chenna Reddy (Rangareddy)	27 March 1967	26 November 1968	1 year, 244 days	1	Nominated as Uttar Pradesh Governor
16	Kasu Vengal Reddy (Palnadu)	3 April 1962	3 April 1968	6 years, 0 days	1	Retired
17	K. V. Raghunatha Reddy (Nellore)	3 April 1962	3 April 1968	6 years, 0 days	3	Re-Elected
17	K. V. Raghunatha Reddy (Nellore)	3 April 1968	3 April 1974	6 years, 0 days	3	Re-Elected
17	K. V. Raghunatha Reddy (Nellore)	3 April 1974	3 April 1980	6 years, 0 days	3	Retired; Served as Governor
18	Yella Reddy (Karimnagar)	3 April 1964	3 April 1970	6 years, 0 days	1	Retired
19	Y. Adinarayana Reddy (YSR Kadapa)	3 April 1964	3 April 1970	6 years, 0 days	2	Elected as MLC
19	Y. Adinarayana Reddy (YSR Kadapa)	3 April 1982	3 April 1988	6 years, 0 days	2	Retired
20	M. Srinivasa Reddy (Nalgonda)	3 April 1968	3 April 1968	6 years, 0 days	1	Retired
21	G. Narayana Reddy (Hyderabad)	3 April 1970	3 April 1976	6 years, 0 days	1	Retired
22	Bezawada Papi Reddy (Nellore)	10 April 1972	10 April 1978	6 years, 0 days	1	Retired
23	Nedurumalli Janardhana Reddy (Nellore)	10 April 1972	10 April 1978	6 years, 0 days	3	Elected as MLC
23	Nedurumalli Janardhana Reddy (Nellore)	1 April 2009	21 June 2010	1 year, 81 days	3	For 1 Year
23	Nedurumalli Janardhana Reddy (Nellore)	22 June 2010	9 May 2014	3 years, 321 days	3	Death
24	Kasu Brahmananda Reddy (Palnadu)	3 April 1974	20 March 1977	2 years, 351 days	1	Elected to Lok Sabha
25	R. Narasimha Reddy	3 April 1978	3 April 1984	6 years, 0 days	1	Retired
26	Bheemireddy Satya Narayana Reddy (Mahabubnagar)	10 April 1978	10 April 1984	6 years, 0 days	2	Re-Elected
26	Bheemireddy Satya Narayana Reddy (Mahabubnagar)	10 April 1984	10 April 1990	6 years, 0 days	2	Retired; Nominated as Governor of Uttar Pradesh
27	Tatiparthi Chandrasekhar Reddy (Chittoor)	16 September 1981	10 April 1984	2 years, 207 days	3	By-Election
27	Tatiparthi Chandrasekhar Reddy (Chittoor)	10 April 1984	10 April 1990	6 years, 0 days	3	Re-Elected
27	Tatiparthi Chandrasekhar Reddy (Chittoor)	10 April 1990	30 December 1993	3 years, 271 days	3	Death
28	Potu Babul Reddy (Nellore)	3 April 1982	3 April 1988	6 years, 0 days	1	Retired
29	G. Vijaya Mohan Reddy (Adilabad)	3 April 1986	3 April 1992	6 years, 0 days	1	Retired
30	Narreddy Tulasi Reddy (YSR Kadapa)	3 April 1988	3 April 1994	6 years, 0 days	1	Elected as Zilla Parishad Chairman
31	Sudini Jaipal Reddy (Mahabubnagar)	10 April 1990	10 April 1996	6 years, 0 days	2	Re- Elected
31	Sudini Jaipal Reddy (Mahabubnagar)	29 September 1997	2 March 1998	154 days	2	Elected to Lok Sabha
32	Gangula Prathap Reddy (Kurnool)	3 April 1992	3 April 1998	6 years, 0 days	1	Elected as MLA
33	T. Venkattram Reddy (Sangareddy)	31 January 1994	3 April 1994	62 days	2	Re-Elected
33	T. Venkattram Reddy (Sangareddy)	3 April 1994	3 April 2000	6 years, 0 days	2	Retired
34	S. Ramachandra Reddy (Anantapur)	10 April 1996	10 April 2002	6 years, 0 days	1	Retired
35	C. Narayana Reddy (Karimnagar)	27 August 1997	27 August 2003	6 years, 0 days	1	Nominated by President
36	P. Prabhakar Reddy (Adilabad)	3 April 1998	3 April 2004	6 years, 0 days	1	Retired
37	Ramamuni Reddy Sirigi Reddy (Warangal)	3 April 2000	3 April 2006	6 years, 0 days	1	Retired
38	T. Subbarami Reddy (Nellore)	10 April 2002	10 April 2008	6 years, 0 days	3	Former Member of Lok Sabha
38	T. Subbarami Reddy (Nellore)	10 April 2008	10 April 2014	6 years, 0 days	3	Re-Elected
38	T. Subbarami Reddy (Nellore)	10 April 2014	10 April 2020	6 years, 0 days	3	Retired
39	Ravula Chandra Sekar Reddy (Wanaparthy)	10 April 2002	10 April 2008	6 years, 0 days	1	Elected as MLA
40	M. V. Mysura Reddy (Kadapa)	3 April 2006	3 April 2012	6 years, 0 days	1	Retired
41	G. Sanjeeva Reddy	3 April 2006	3 April 2012	6 years, 0 days	1	Retired
42	Palvai Govardhan Reddy (Nalgonda)	3 April 2012	9 June 2017	5 years, 67 days	1	Death
43	D. Kupendra Reddy (Bangalore)	26 June 2014	26 June 2020	6 years, 0 days	1	Retired
44	V. Vijayasai Reddy (Nellore)	22 June 2016	22 June 2022	6 years, 0 days	2	Re-Elected
44	V. Vijayasai Reddy (Nellore)	22 June 2022	25 January 2025	2 years, 217 days	2	Resigned; Retired
45	Vemireddy Prabhakar Reddy (Nellore)	3 April 2018	3 April 2024	6 years, 0 days	1	Elected to Lok Sabha
46	K. R. Suresh Reddy (Nizamabad)	10 April 2020	9 April 2026	6 years, 0 days	1	Former Speaker of AP Legislative Assembly
47	Alla Ayodhya Rami Reddy (Guntur)	22 June 2020	Incumbent	6 years, 129 days	1	Contested to Lok Sabha Unsuccessfully from Narasaraopet
48	S. Niranjan Reddy (Nizamabad)	22 June 2022	Incumbent	4 years, 129 days	1	Supreme Court Advocate
49	B. Parthasaradhi Reddy (Khairatabad)	22 June 2022	Incumbent	4 years, 129 days	1	Business Man
50	Y. V. Subba Reddy (Parkasam)	3 April 2024	Incumbent	2 years, 209 days	1	Served as TTD Chairman
51	Meda Raghunath Reddy (YSR Kadapa)	3 April 2024	Incumbent	2 years, 209 days	1	Business Man
52	Vem Narender Reddy (Mahabubabad)	9 April 2026	To be Announced	203 days	1	Former MLA & Advisor of Telangana Government

=== House of People (Lok Sabha) ===
#	Name	Constituency (State)	Term(s)	Term of the Office		Duration
#	Name	Constituency (State)	Term(s)	Start	End	Duration
1	Chaudhari Madhava Reddy	Adilabad (Telangana)	2	17 April 1952	4 April 1957	4 years, 352 days
1	Chaudhari Madhava Reddy	Adilabad (Telangana)	2	31 December 1984	21 November 1989	4 years, 325 days
2	Gade Narayan Reddy	Adilabad (Telangana)	1	3 April 1962	2 March 1967	4 years, 333 days
3	Poddutoori Ganga Reddy	Adilabad (Telangana)	2	4 March 1967	27 December 1970	3 years, 298 days
3	Poddutoori Ganga Reddy	Adilabad (Telangana)	2	15 March 1971	18 January 1977	5 years, 309 days
4	Gaddem Narsimha Reddy	Adilabad (Telangana)	2	25 March 1977	22 August 1979	22 years, 150 days
4	Gaddem Narsimha Reddy	Adilabad (Telangana)	2	18 January 1980	31 December 1984	4 years, 348 days
5	Poddutoori Narsa Reddy	Adilabad (Telangana)	1	2 December 1989	13 March 1991	1 year, 101 days
6	Allola Indrakaran Reddy	Adilabad (Telangana)	2	20 June 1991	10 May 1996	4 years, 325 days
6	Allola Indrakaran Reddy	Adilabad (Telangana)	2	1 June 2008	18 May 2009	351 days
7	Takkala Madhusudhan Reddy	Adilabad (Telangana)	1	2 June 2004	31 May 2008	3 years, 364 days
8	Tarimela Nagi Reddy	Anantapur (Andhra Pradesh)	1	5 April 1957	31 March 1962	4 years, 360 days
9	Ponnapati Antony Reddy	Anantapur (Andhra Pradesh)	2	4 March 1967	27 December 1970	3 years, 298 days
9	Ponnapati Antony Reddy	Anantapur (Andhra Pradesh)	2	15 March 1971	18 January 1977	5 years, 309 days
10	Anantha Venkat Reddy	Anantapur (Andhra Pradesh)	2	2 December 1989	13 March 1991	1 year, 101 days
10	Anantha Venkat Reddy	Anantapur (Andhra Pradesh)	2	20 June 1991	10 May 1996	4 years, 325 days
11	Anantha Venkatarami Reddy	Anantapur (Andhra Pradesh)	4	11 May 1996	4 December 1997	1 year, 207 days
11	Anantha Venkatarami Reddy	Anantapur (Andhra Pradesh)	4	23 March 1998	26 April 1999	1 year, 34 days
11	Anantha Venkatarami Reddy	Anantapur (Andhra Pradesh)	4	2 June 2004	18 May 2009	4 years, 350 days
11	Anantha Venkatarami Reddy	Anantapur (Andhra Pradesh)	4	1 June 2009	18 May 2014	−14 days
12	Jutur Chinna Reddy Diwakar Reddy	Anantapur (Andhra Pradesh)	1	4 June 2014	24 May 2019	4 years, 354 days
13	Gali Karunakara Reddy	Bellary (Karnataka)	1	2 June 2004	20 March 2008	3 years, 292 days
14	Komatireddy Raj Gopal Reddy	Bhongir (Telangana)	1	1 June 2009	18 May 2014	4 years, 351 days
15	Komatireddy Venkat Reddy	Bhongir (Telangana)	1	17 June 2019	5 December 2023	4 years, 171 days
16	Chamala Kiran Kumar Reddy	Bhongir (Telangana)	1	12 June 2024	Incumbent	2 years, 139 days
17	Sudini Jaipal Reddy	Mahabubnagar (Telangana)	5	31 December 1984	27 November 1989	4 years, 331 days
17	Sudini Jaipal Reddy	Mahabubnagar (Telangana)	5	10 March 1998	26 April 1999	1 year, 48 days
17	Sudini Jaipal Reddy	Miryalguda (Telangana)	5	20 October 1999	6 February 2004	4 years, 109 days
17	Sudini Jaipal Reddy	Miryalguda (Telangana)	5	2 June 2004	18 May 2009	4 years, 350 days
17	Sudini Jaipal Reddy	Chevella (Telangana)	5	1 June 2009	18 May 2014	4 years, 351 days
18	Konda Vishweshwar Reddy	Chevella (Telangana)	2	4 June 2014	24 May 2019	4 years, 354 days
18	Konda Vishweshwar Reddy	Chevella (Telangana)	2	17 June 2024	Incumbent	2 years, 134 days
19	Gaddam Ranjith Reddy	Chevella (Telangana)	1	25 May 2019	16 June 2024	5 years, 22 days
20	T. N. Viswanatha Reddy	Chittoor (Andhra Pradesh)	2	17 April 1952	4 April 1952	4 years, 352 days
20	T. N. Viswanatha Reddy	Rajampet (Andhra Pradesh)	2	5 April 1957	31 March 1962	4 years, 333 days
21	P. Narasimha Reddy	Chittoor (Andhra Pradesh)	1	15 March 1971	18 January 1977	5 years, 309 days
22	Mahasamudram Gnanendra Reddy	Chittoor (Andhra Pradesh)	2	2 December 1989	13 March 1991	1 year, 101 days
22	Mahasamudram Gnanendra Reddy	Chittoor (Andhra Pradesh)	2	14 March 1991	10 May 1996	5 years, 57 days
23	Nuthanakalva Ramakrishna Reddy	Chittoor (Andhra Pradesh)	3	11 May 1996	27 December 1997	1 year, 230 days
23	Nuthanakalva Ramakrishna Reddy	Chittoor (Andhra Pradesh)	3	3 January 1998	26 April 1999	1 year, 113 days
23	Nuthanakalva Ramakrishna Reddy	Chittoor (Andhra Pradesh)	3	27 April 1999	6 February 2004	4 years, 285 days
24	Chandupatla Janga Reddy	Hanamkonda (Telangana)	1	3 January 1985	27 November 1988	3 years, 329 days
25	Chada Suresh Reddy	Hanamkonda (Telangana)	2	27 December 1997	26 April 1999	1 year, 120 days
25	Chada Suresh Reddy	Hanamkonda (Telangana)	2	27 April 1999	6 February 2004	4 years, 285 days
26	K. V. Ramakrishna Reddy	Hindupur (Andhra Pradesh)	2	4 April 1957	31 March 1962	4 years, 361 days
26	K. V. Ramakrishna Reddy	Hindupur (Andhra Pradesh)	2	1 April 1962	3 March 1967	4 years, 336 days
27	Neelam Sanjiva Reddy	Hindupur (Andhra Pradesh)	2	4 March 1967	27 December 1970	3 years, 298 days
27	Neelam Sanjiva Reddy	Nandyal (Andhra Pradesh)	2	23 March 1977	13 July 1977	112 days
28	Pamudurthi Bayapa Reddy	Hindupur (Andhra Pradesh)	3	4 January 1971	18 January 1977	6 years, 14 days
28	Pamudurthi Bayapa Reddy	Hindupur (Andhra Pradesh)	3	19 January 1977	22 August 1979	2 years, 215 days
28	Pamudurthi Bayapa Reddy	Hindupur (Andhra Pradesh)	3	18 January 1980	31 December 1984	4 years, 348 days
29	S. Ramachandra Reddy	Hindupur (Andhra Pradesh)	1	10 May 1996	27 December 1997	1 year, 231 days
30	Yeddula Eswara Reddy	Kadapa (Andhra Pradesh)	4	17 April 1952	4 April 1957	4 years, 352 days
30	Yeddula Eswara Reddy	Kadapa (Andhra Pradesh)	4	1 April 1962	3 March 1967	4 years, 336 days
30	Yeddula Eswara Reddy	Kadapa (Andhra Pradesh)	4	4 March 1967	27 December 1970	3 years, 298 days
30	Yeddula Eswara Reddy	Kadapa (Andhra Pradesh)	4	28 December 1970	18 January 1977	6 years, 21 days
31	Vutukuru Rami Reddy	Kadapa (Andhra Pradesh)	1	5 April 1957	31 March 1962	4 years, 360 days
32	Kandula Obul Reddy	Kadapa (Andhra Pradesh)	2	19 January 1977	22 August 1979	2 years, 215 days
32	Kandula Obul Reddy	Kadapa (Andhra Pradesh)	2	18 January 1980	31 December 1984	4 years, 348 days
33	Devireddy Narayana Reddy	Kadapa (Andhra Pradesh)	1	31 December 1984	27 November 1989	4 years, 331 days
34	Yeduguri Sandhinti Rajasekhara Reddy	Kadapa (Andhra Pradesh)	4	2 December 1989	13 March 1991	1 year, 101 days
34	Yeduguri Sandhinti Rajasekhara Reddy	Kadapa (Andhra Pradesh)	4	14 March 1991	10 May 1996	5 years, 57 days
34	Yeduguri Sandhinti Rajasekhara Reddy	Kadapa (Andhra Pradesh)	4	11 May 1996	27 December 1997	1 year, 230 days
34	Yeduguri Sandhinti Rajasekhara Reddy	Kadapa (Andhra Pradesh)	4	28 December 1997	26 April 1999	1 year, 119 days
35	Yeduguri Sandhinti Vivekananda Reddy	Kadapa (Andhra Pradesh)	2	27 April 1999	6 February 2004	4 years, 285 days
35	Yeduguri Sandhinti Vivekananda Reddy	Kadapa (Andhra Pradesh)	2	7 February 2004	1 June 2009	5 years, 114 days
36	Yeduguri Sandhinti Jagan Mohan Reddy	Kadapa (Andhra Pradesh)	2	2 June 2009	29 November 2010	1 year, 180 days
36	Yeduguri Sandhinti Jagan Mohan Reddy	Kadapa (Andhra Pradesh)	2	30 November 2010	16 May 2014	3 years, 167 days
37	Yeduguri Sandhinti Avinash Reddy	Kadapa (Andhra Pradesh)	3	17 May 2014	24 May 2019	5 years, 7 days
37	Yeduguri Sandhinti Avinash Reddy	Kadapa (Andhra Pradesh)	3	25 May 2019	4 June 2024	5 years, 7 days
37	Yeduguri Sandhinti Avinash Reddy	Kadapa (Andhra Pradesh)	3	5 June 2024	Incumbent	2 years, 146 days
38	Baddam Yella Reddy	Karimnagar (Telangana)	1	17 April 1952	4 April 1957	4 years, 352 days
39	Ponguleti Srinivas Reddy	Khammam (Telangana)	1	16 May 2014	23 May 2019	5 years, 7 days
40	Ramasahayam Raghuram Reddy	Khammam (Telangana)	1	4 June 2024	Incumbent	2 years, 147 days
41	Yashoda Reddy	Kurnool (Andhra Pradesh)	1	1 April 1962	3 March 1967	4 years, 336 days
42	K. Kodanda Rami Reddy	Kurnool (Andhra Pradesh)	1	28 December 1970	18 January 1977	6 years, 21 days
43	Kotla Vijaya Bhaskara Reddy	Kurnool (Andhra Pradesh)	6	19 January 1977	22 August 1979	2 years, 215 days
43	Kotla Vijaya Bhaskara Reddy	Kurnool (Andhra Pradesh)	6	23 August 1979	31 December 1984	5 years, 130 days
43	Kotla Vijaya Bhaskara Reddy	Kurnool (Andhra Pradesh)	6	2 December 1989	13 March 1991	1 year, 101 days
43	Kotla Vijaya Bhaskara Reddy	Kurnool (Andhra Pradesh)	6	14 March 1991	2 September 1991	172 days
43	Kotla Vijaya Bhaskara Reddy	Kurnool (Andhra Pradesh)	6	10 May 1996	27 December 1997	1 year, 231 days
43	Kotla Vijaya Bhaskara Reddy	Kurnool (Andhra Pradesh)	6	28 December 1997	26 April 1999	1 year, 119 days
44	Kotla Jayasurya Prakasha Reddy	Kurnool (Andhra Pradesh)	3	3 September 1991	10 May 1996	4 years, 250 days
44	Kotla Jayasurya Prakasha Reddy	Kurnool (Andhra Pradesh)	3	18 May 2004	2 June 2009	5 years, 15 days
44	Kotla Jayasurya Prakasha Reddy	Kurnool (Andhra Pradesh)	3	3 June 2009	16 May 2014	4 years, 347 days
45	Katepally Janardhan Reddy	Mahabubnagar (Telangana)	1	17 April 1952	4 April 1957	4 years, 352 days
46	Anugula Papi Reddy Jithender Reddy	Mahabubnagar (Telangana)	2	27 April 1999	6 February 2004	4 years, 285 days
46	Anugula Papi Reddy Jithender Reddy	Mahabubnagar (Telangana)	2	16 May 2014	23 May 2019	5 years, 7 days
47	Manne Srinivas Reddy	Mahabubnagar (Telangana)	1	24 May 2019	4 June 2024	5 years, 11 days
48	Dharmavarapu Kottam Aruna Reddy	Mahabubnagar (Telangana)	1	5 June 2024	Incumbent	2 years, 146 days
49	Chamakuru Malla Reddy	Malkajgiri (Telangana)	1	16 May 2014	2 December 2018	4 years, 200 days
50	Anumula Revanth Reddy	Malkajgiri (Telangana)	1	23 May 2019	5 December 2023	4 years, 196 days
51	P. Manik Reddy	Medak (Telangana)	1	31 December 1984	27 November 1989	4 years, 331 days
52	Mogaligundla Baga Reddy	Medak (Telangana)	4	2 December 1989	13 March 1991	1 year, 101 days
52	Mogaligundla Baga Reddy	Medak (Telangana)	4	14 March 1991	10 May 1996	5 years, 57 days
52	Mogaligundla Baga Reddy	Medak (Telangana)	4	11 May 1996	27 December 1997	1 year, 230 days
52	Mogaligundla Baga Reddy	Medak (Telangana)	4	28 December 1997	26 April 1999	1 year, 119 days
53	Kotha Prabhakar Reddy	Medak (Telangana)	2	15 September 2014	23 May 2019	4 years, 250 days
53	Kotha Prabhakar Reddy	Medak (Telangana)	2	24 May 2019	4 June 2024	5 years, 11 days
54	G. S. Reddy	Miryalguda (Telangana)	3	4 March 1967	27 December 1970	3 years, 298 days
54	G. S. Reddy	Miryalguda (Telangana)	3	23 March 1977	22 August 1979	2 years, 152 days
54	G. S. Reddy	Miryalguda (Telangana)	3	23 August 1979	31 December 1984	5 years, 130 days
55	Bhimreddy Narasimha Reddy	Miryalguda (Telangana)	3	28 December 1970	22 March 1977	6 years, 84 days
55	Bhimreddy Narasimha Reddy	Miryalguda (Telangana)	3	1 January 1985	27 November 1989	4 years, 330 days
55	Bhimreddy Narasimha Reddy	Miryalguda (Telangana)	3	14 March 1991	10 May 1996	5 years, 57 days
56	Baddam Narsimha Reddy	Miryalguda (Telangana)	3	2 December 1989	13 March 1991	1 year, 101 days
56	Baddam Narsimha Reddy	Miryalguda (Telangana)	3	11 May 1996	27 December 1997	1 year, 230 days
56	Baddam Narsimha Reddy	Miryalguda (Telangana)	3	28 December 1997	26 April 1999	1 year, 119 days
57	Ravi Narayana Reddy	Nalgonda (Telangana)	2	17 April 1952	4 April 1957	4 years, 352 days
57	Ravi Narayana Reddy	Nalgonda (Telangana)	2	16 April 1962	3 March 1967	4 years, 321 days
58	Kancharla Ramkrishna Reddy	Nalgonda (Telangana)	1	27 December 1970	18 January 1977	6 years, 22 days
59	T. Damodar Reddy	Nalgonda (Telangana)	1	13 March 1980	31 December 1984	5 years, 130 days
60	M. Raghuma Reddy	Nalgonda (Telangana)	1	1 January 1985	27 November 1989	4 years, 330 days
61	Suravaram Sudhakar Reddy	Nalgonda (Telangana)	2	27 November 1997	26 April 1999	1 year, 150 days
61	Suravaram Sudhakar Reddy	Nalgonda (Telangana)	2	16 May 2004	1 June 2009	5 years, 16 days
62	Gutha Sukender Reddy	Nalgonda (Telangana)	3	26 April 1999	6 February 2004	4 years, 286 days
62	Gutha Sukender Reddy	Nalgonda (Telangana)	3	1 June 2009	15 May 2014	4 years, 348 days
62	Gutha Sukender Reddy	Nalgonda (Telangana)	3	16 May 2014	23 May 2019	5 years, 7 days
63	Nalamada Uttam Kumar Reddy	Nalgonda (Telangana)	1	24 May 2019	6 December 2023	4 years, 196 days
64	Kunduru Raghuveera Reddy	Nalgonda (Telangana)	1	4 June 2024	Incumbent	2 years, 147 days
65	Maddur Subba Reddy	Nandyal (Andhra Pradesh)	1	1 January 1985	27 November 1989	4 years, 330 days
66	Bojja Venkata Reddy	Nandyal (Andhra Pradesh)	1	2 December 1989	13 March 1991	1 year, 101 days
67	Gangula Prathap Reddy	Nandyal (Andhra Pradesh)	1	14 March 1991	10 May 1996	5 years, 57 days
68	Bhuma Nagi Reddy	Nandyal (Andhra Pradesh)	3	25 August 1996	27 December 1997	1 year, 124 days
68	Bhuma Nagi Reddy	Nandyal (Andhra Pradesh)	3	28 December 1997	26 April 1999	1 year, 119 days
68	Bhuma Nagi Reddy	Nandyal (Andhra Pradesh)	3	27 April 1999	6 February 2004	4 years, 285 days
69	S. Pedda Yerikal Reddy	Nandyal (Andhra Pradesh)	3	13 May 2004	1 June 2009	5 years, 19 days
69	S. Pedda Yerikal Reddy	Nandyal (Andhra Pradesh)	3	2 June 2009	15 May 2014	4 years, 347 days
69	S. Pedda Yerikal Reddy	Nandyal (Andhra Pradesh)	3	16 May 2014	23 May 2019	5 years, 7 days
70	Pocha Brahmananda Reddy	Nandyal (Andhra Pradesh)	1	24 May 2019	4 June 2024	5 years, 11 days
71	Byreddy Shabari Reddy	Nandyal (Andhra Pradesh)	1	5 June 2024	Incumbent	2 years, 146 days
72	Kasu Brahmananda Reddy	Narasaraopet (Andhra Pradesh)	2	19 January 1977	23 August 1979	2 years, 216 days
72	Kasu Brahmananda Reddy	Narasaraopet (Andhra Pradesh)	2	24 August 1979	31 December 1984	5 years, 129 days
73	Kasu Venkata Krishna Reddy	Narasaraopet (Andhra Pradesh)	2	2 December 1989	13 March 1991	1 year, 101 days
73	Kasu Venkata Krishna Reddy	Narasaraopet (Andhra Pradesh)	2	20 June 1991	10 May 1996	4 years, 325 days
74	Nedurumalli Janardhana Reddy	Narasaraopet (Andhra Pradesh)	2	26 April 1999	6 February 2004	4 years, 286 days
74	Nedurumalli Janardhana Reddy	Visakhapatnam (Andhra Pradesh)	2	15 May 2004	1 June 2009	5 years, 17 days
75	Modugula Venugopala Reddy	Narasaraopet (Andhra Pradesh)	1	2 June 2009	16 May 2014	4 years, 348 days
76	Bezawada Ramachandra Reddy	Nellore (Andhra Pradesh)	1	17 April 1952	4 April 1957	4 years, 352 days
77	Mekapati Rajamohan Reddy	Ongole (Andhra Pradesh)	5	3 December 1989	13 March 1991	1 year, 100 days
77	Mekapati Rajamohan Reddy	Narsaraopet (Andhra Pradesh)	5	16 May 2004	1 June 2009	5 years, 16 days
77	Mekapati Rajamohan Reddy	Nellore (Andhra Pradesh)	5	1 June 2009	13 May 2012	2 years, 347 days
77	Mekapati Rajamohan Reddy	Nellore (Andhra Pradesh)	5	14 May 2012	15 May 2014	2 years, 1 day
77	Mekapati Rajamohan Reddy	Nellore (Andhra Pradesh)	5	16 May 2014	23 May 2019	5 years, 7 days
78	Adala Prabhakara Reddy	Nellore (Andhra Pradesh)	1	23 May 2019	4 June 2024	5 years, 12 days
79	Vemireddy Prabhakar Reddy	Nellore (Andhra Pradesh)	1	5 June 2024	Incumbent	2 years, 146 days
80	Muduganti Narayana Reddy	Nizamabad (Telangana)	1	4 March 1967	27 December 1970	2 years, 298 days
81	Muduganti Ram Gopal Reddy	Nizamabad (Telangana)	3	28 December 1970	18 January 1977	6 years, 21 days
81	Muduganti Ram Gopal Reddy	Nizamabad (Telangana)	3	19 January 1977	23 August 1979	2 years, 216 days
81	Muduganti Ram Gopal Reddy	Nizamabad (Telangana)	3	4 January 1980	31 December 1984	4 years, 362 days
82	Gaddam Ganga Reddy	Nizamabad (Telangana)	3	20 June 1991	10 May 1996	4 years, 325 days
82	Gaddam Ganga Reddy	Nizamabad (Telangana)	3	27 December 1997	26 April 1999	1 year, 120 days
82	Gaddam Ganga Reddy	Nizamabad (Telangana)	3	27 April 1999	6 February 2004	4 years, 285 days
83	Gaddam Atmacharan Reddy	Nizamabad (Telangana)	1	13 May 1996	26 December 1997	1 year, 227 days
84	Ronda Narappa Reddy	Ongole (Andhra Pradesh)	1	5 April 1957	31 March 1962	4 years, 360 days
85	Puli Venkat Reddy	Ongole (Andhra Pradesh)	2	19 January 1977	27 December 1979	2 years, 342 days
85	Puli Venkat Reddy	Ongole (Andhra Pradesh)	2	28 December 1979	31 December 1984	5 years, 3 days
86	Bezawada Papi Reddy	Ongole (Andhra Pradesh)	1	1 January 1985	27 November 1989	4 years, 330 days
87	Magunta Subbarama Reddy	Ongole (Andhra Pradesh)	1	20 June 1991	10 May 1996	4 years, 325 days
88	Magunta Parvathamma Reddy	Ongole (Andhra Pradesh)	1	13 May 1996	27 December 1997	1 year, 228 days
89	Yerram Venkata Subba Reddy	Ongole (Andhra Pradesh)	1	16 May 2014	23 May 2019	5 years, 7 days
90	Magunta Sreenivasulu Reddy	Ongole (Andhra Pradesh)	5	3 December 1998	26 April 1999	144 days
90	Magunta Sreenivasulu Reddy	Ongole (Andhra Pradesh)	5	10 May 2004	1 June 2009	5 years, 22 days
90	Magunta Sreenivasulu Reddy	Ongole (Andhra Pradesh)	5	2 June 2009	16 May 2014	4 years, 348 days
90	Magunta Sreenivasulu Reddy	Ongole (Andhra Pradesh)	5	23 May 2019	4 June 2024	5 years, 12 days
90	Magunta Sreenivasulu Reddy	Ongole (Andhra Pradesh)	5	5 June 2024	Incumbent	2 years, 146 days
91	Thikkavarapu Subbarami Reddy	Visakhapatnam (Andhra Pradesh)	2	13 May 1996	27 December 1997	1 year, 228 days
91	Thikkavarapu Subbarami Reddy	Visakhapatnam (Andhra Pradesh)	2	3 January 1998	26 April 1999	1 year, 113 days
92	Peddireddy Venkata Mithun Reddy	Rajampet (Andhra Pradesh)	3	16 May 2014	23 May 2019	5 years, 7 days
92	Peddireddy Venkata Mithun Reddy	Rajampet (Andhra Pradesh)	3	24 May 2019	4 June 2024	5 years, 11 days
92	Peddireddy Venkata Mithun Reddy	Rajampet (Andhra Pradesh)	3	5 June 2024	Incumbent	2 years, 146 days
93	V. Vaithilingam	Puducherry	2	23 May 2019	4 June 2024	5 years, 12 days
93	V. Vaithilingam	Puducherry	2	5 June 2024	Incumbent	2 years, 146 days
94	Gangapuram Kishan Reddy	Secunderabad (Telangana)	2	23 May 2019	4 June 2024	5 years, 12 days
94	Gangapuram Kishan Reddy	Secunderabad (Telangana)	2	5 June 2024	Incumbent	2 years, 146 days

== Members of Legislative Assembly ==
=== Sasana Sabha ===
- Chilukuri Ramachandra Reddy
- Chilukuri Vaman Reddy
- H. Ramalinga Reddy
- H. Sitarama Reddy
- Y. Sai Prasad Reddy
- Arutla Kamaladevi Ramachandra Reddy
- Anreddy Punna Reddy
- H. Ramalinga Reddy
- D. Lakshmikantha Reddy
- Patil Neeraja Reddy
- Gangula Thimma Reddy
- Somula Venkata Subba Reddy
- Gangula Prathap Reddy
- Bhuma Sekhara Reddy
- Bhuma Nagi Reddy
- Shobha Nagi Reddy
- Bhuma Akhila Priya Reddy
- Gangula Brijendra Reddy
- Bezawada Papi Reddy
- Rebala Dasradha Rami Reddy
- Adala Prabhakara Reddy
- Katamreddy Vishnuvardhan Reddy
- D. Muralidhar Reddy
- T. Chandra Sekhara Reddy
- Ram Bhupal Reddy
- Ravula Ravindranath Reddy
- Kothakota Prakasha Reddy
- Challa Venkatrami Reddy
- Tarimela Nagi Reddy
- P. Anthony Reddy
- Bodimalla Narayana Reddy
- Bodimalla Gurunatha Reddy
- Anantha Venkatarami Reddy
- Padala Satyanarayana Reddy
- Tetala Lakshmi Narayana Reddy
- Padala Ammi Reddy
- Nallamilli Moola Reddy
- Tetala Rama Reddy
- Nallamilli Sesha Reddy
- Nallamilli Ramakrishna Reddy
- Sathi Suryanarayana Reddy
- Tunmala Ranga Reddy
- Sanigaram Santosh Reddy
- Aleti Mahipal Reddy
- Aleti Annapurna Devi Reddy
- Asannagari Jeevan Reddy
- Paidi Rakesh Reddy
- G. Narayana Reddy
- Bezawada Gopala Reddy
- Anam Sanjeeva Reddy
- Pellakure Ramachandra Reddy
- Bommireddy Sundara Rami Reddy
- Anam Venkata Reddy
- Anam Ramanarayana Reddy
- Mekapati Goutham Reddy
- Mekapati Vikram Reddy
- A. V. Appaswamy Reddy
- G. V. Srirama Reddy
- S. N. Subba Reddy
- Chirla Govardhana Reddy
- Gade Venkata Reddy
- Murla Yerraiah Reddy
- B. Veera Reddy
- Vijayamma Veera Reddy
- Devasani Chinna Govind Reddy
- K. Anantha Reddy
- Ranga Reddy
- G. Madhusudhan Reddy
- K. R. Suresh Reddy
- Vemula Prashanth Reddy
- Katasani Rami Reddy
- B. C. Janardhana Reddy
- Srinivasa Reddy
- Pocharam Srinivas Reddy
- G. Somashekara Reddy
- Nara Bharath Reddy
- Ravi Narayan Reddy
- Arutla Ramchandra Reddy
- Kommidi Narasimha Reddy
- Alimineti Madhava Reddy
- Uma Madhava Reddy
- Pailla Shekar Reddy
- Kumbam Anil Kumar Reddy
- Gandra Venkata Ramana Reddy
- M. Ramgopal Reddy
- Narayan Reddy
- Podduturi Sudarshan Reddy
- M. Satish Reddy
- Ramalinga Reddy
- Nimma Raja Reddy
- Kommuri Pratap Reddy
- Chevireddy Bhaskar Reddy
- M. C. Anjaneya Reddy
- T. K. Gangi Reddy
- Chowda Reddy
- K. M. Krishna Reddy
- Malapalli Chowdareddy Sudhakar Reddy
- J. K. Krishna Reddy
- Mulka Govinda Reddy
- G. H. Thippa Reddy
- Chinnama Reddy
- C. K. Jayachandra Reddy
- Gurram Madhava Reddy
- Konda Lakshma Reddy
- Patlolla Indra Reddy
- Sabitha Indra Reddy
- Seetha Dayakar Reddy
- Ala Venkateshwar Reddy
- Gavinolla Madhusudan Reddy
- Sanikommu Kasi Reddy
- Dirisala Venkata Ramanana Reddy
- Dirisala Raja Gopala Reddy
- Sanikommu Pitchi Reddy
- Buchepalli Subba Reddy
- Buchepalli Siva Prasad Reddy
- Gonuguntla Anantha Reddy
- Garudammagari Nagi Reddy
- Kethireddy Surya Pratap Reddy
- Kethireddy Venkatarami Reddy
- B. P. Sesha Reddy
- Neelam Sanjiva Reddy
- Kotla Vijaya Bhaskara Reddy
- Buggana Rajendranath Reddy
- Kotla Jayasurya Prakasha Reddy
- N. Ramachandra Reddy
- Ramashayam Surender Reddy
- Cheruku Muthyam Reddy
- Solipeta Ramalinga Reddy
- Kotha Prabhakar Reddy
- A. Rami Reddy
- Lankireddy Lakshma Reddy
- Bontu Gopala Reddy
- M. V. Sivarama Krishna Reddy
- Gudibandi Venkata Reddy
- D. K. Satya Reddy
- Gopala Reddy
- Paga Pulla Reddy
- D. K. Samara Simha Reddy
- N. Gopala Reddy
- D. K. Bharata Simha Reddy
- D. K. Aruna Reddy
- Bandla Krishna Mohan Reddy
- J. Geeta Reddy
- Thumkunta Narsa Reddy
- N. C. Nagaiah Reddy
- K. H. Venkata Reddy
- S. V. Aswathanarayan Reddy
- N. Jyothi Reddy
- N. H. Shivashankara Reddy
- Pidathala Ranga Reddy
- Edula Balarami Reddy
- Mudiam Peera Reddy
- Yalluri Venkata Reddy
- Pidathala Ramabhupal Reddy
- Pidathala Vijay Kumar Reddy
- Pidathala Sai Kalpana Reddy
- Muthumula Ashok Reddy
- Y. Venkatrami Reddy
- Modugula Venugopala Reddy
- Mandapati Nagi Reddy
- Julakanti Nsgi Reddy
- Mutyam Anki Reddy
- Kaviti Venkat Narsa Reddy
- Kasu Mahesh Reddy
- Palleti Gopalakrishna Reddy
- V. Ramachandra Reddy
- Srinivasulu Reddy Nallpareddy
- G. Karunakara Reddy
- Siva Sankara Reddy
- K. Ramakrishna Reddy
- Kotha Raji Reddy
- Kethiri Sai Reddy
- E. Peddi Reddy
- Padi Kaushik Reddy
- Nalamada Uttam Kumar Reddy
- Nalamada Padmavathi Reddy
- Shanampudi Saidi Reddy
- K. Papi Reddy
- N. Anantha Reddy
- Manchireddy Kishan Reddy
- Malreddy Ranga Reddy
- L. N. Reddy
- M. Krishna Reddy
- Sudhakar Reddy
- C. Laxma Reddy
- Janampalli Anirudh Reddy
- G. H. Ashwath Reddy
- Baddam Malla Reddy
- Tatiparthi Jeevan Reddy
- Thathireddi Narasimha Reddy
- Chavva Moramm Gari Ramanatha Reddy
- Ponnapureddy Siva Reddy
- Ponnapureddy Ramasubba Reddy
- Ch. Adinarayana Reddy
- Mule Sudheer Reddy
- G. Gopal Reddy
- Kodur Varadha Reddy
- Rondla Laxma Reddy
- Asireddy Narasimha Reddy
- Charagonda Raji Reddy
- Muthireddy Yadagiri Reddy
- Palla Rajeshwar Reddy
- K. Koti Reddy
- Gajjala Ranga Reddy
- S. Ramamuni Reddy
- K. Sivananda Reddy
- Reddeppagari Madhavi Reddy
- Venkat Reddy
- G Reddy
- Sudini Jaipal Reddy
- Yadma Krishna Reddy
- Challa Vamshichand Reddy
- Kasireddy Narayan Reddy
- Raghu Veera Reddy
- Narreddi Sivarami Reddy
- Narreddi Sambi Reddy
- Vaddamani Venkata Reddy
- N. Pulla Reddy
- Perla Siva Reddy
- M. V. Mysura Reddy
- Gandluru Veera Siva Reddy
- Pochimareddy Ravindranath Reddy
- Putha Krishna Chaitanya Reddy
- G. Vittal Reddy
- Vittalreddigari Ramana Reddy
- K. V. Ramana Reddy
- M. Adinarayana Reddy
- Manugunta Maheedhar Reddy
- Gujjula Yelamandha Reddy
- Kotapati Guruswamy Reddy
- Puli Venkata Reddy
- Sura Papi Reddy
- Buthulapalli Ramasubba Reddy
- Mukku Kasi Reddy
- Mukku Ugra Narasimha Reddy
- B. Ramakrishna Reddy
- Kaliki Yanadi Reddy
- Vanteru Venugopala Reddy
- Manugunta Parvathamma Subbarama Reddy
- Ramireddy Pratap Kumar Reddy
- Dagumati Venkata Krishna Reddy
- K. Achyutha Reddy
- Rukma Reddy
- Gurunath Reddy
- Anumula Revanth Reddy
- Patnam Narender Reddy
- Chirla Somasundara Reddy
- Chirla Jaggi Reddy
- Rebala Dasartharami Reddy
- V. Venkat Reddy
- Pellakuru Ramachandra Reddy
- Srinivasulu Reddy Nallapareddy
- Nallapareddy Prasanna Kumar Reddy
- Polamreddy Srinivasulu Reddy
- Vemireddy Prashanti Reddy
- N. S. Nandiesha Reddy
- Somula Venkata Mohan Reddy
- Devireddy Sudheer Reddy
- Mandapati Nagi Reddy
- Venna Linga Reddy
- Julakanti Nagi Reddy
- Challa Narapa Reddy
- Kurri Punna Reddy
- Julakanti Durgamba Nagi Reddy
- Pinnelli Laxma Reddy
- Pinnelli Ramakrishna Reddy
- Julakanti Brahmananda Reddy
- M. Ram Reddy
- N. Rajeshwar Reddy
- Yennam srinivas Reddy
- Sabitha Indra Reddy
- Teegala Krishna Reddy
- Chittem Narsi Reddy
- Yelkoti Yella Reddy
- K. Dayakar Reddy
- Chittem Ram Mohan Reddy
- C. Kanaka Reddy
- Marri Rajasekhar Reddy
- Gaddam Aravind Reddy
- Meka Koti Reddy
- Alla Ramakrishna Reddy
- Y. Balanagi Reddy
- Kandula Obul Reddy
- V. V. Narayan Reddy
- Kunduru Pedda Konda Reddy
- Janke Venkata Reddy
- Kandula Narayana Reddy
- Kunduru Nagarjuna Reddy
- Rami Reddy
- Seri Laxma Reddy
- Patlolla Narayana Reddy
- P. Shasidhar Reddy
- Padma Devender Reddy
- Varakantam Gopala Reddy
- Marri Chenna Reddy
- Singireddy Venkata Ramana Reddy
- Kichannagari Laxma Reddy
- Malipeddi Sudheer Reddy
- Chamakura Malla Reddy
- C. Venkata Reddy
- Tippana Chinna Krishna Reddy
- Tippana Vijaya Simha Reddy
- Julakanti Ranga Reddy
- Bathula Laxma Reddy
- Gopidi Ganga Reddy
- Armoor Hanmanth Reddy
- Gaddigari Vittal Reddy
- Palvai Govardhan Reddy
- Palla Venkat Reddy
- Kusukuntla Prabhakar Reddy
- Komatireddy Raj Gopal Reddy
- Bommu Rama Reddy
- Pelakolanu Narayan Reddy
- Settipalli Nagi Reddy
- D. L. Ravindra Reddy
- Settipalli Raghurami Reddy
- Reddyvari Chenga Reddy
- Roja Reddy
- Kunduru Jana Reddy
- Kunduru Jayaveer Reddy
- B. Brahma Reddy
- Janardhan Reddy
- Nagam Janardhan Reddy
- Marri Janardhan Reddy
- Kuchkulla Rajesh Reddy
- Katta Ram Reddy
- Venkata Reddy
- Gutha Mohan Reddy
- Malreddy Raghuma Reddy
- Nandyal Narasimha Reddy
- Komatireddy Venkat Reddy
- Kancharla Bhupal Reddy
- Chandra Pulla Reddy
- Pulyala Venkatakrishna Reddy
- Cattamanchi Ramalinga Reddy
- Maddru Subba Reddy
- Byreddy Sehsa Sayana Reddy
- Ippal Thimma Reddy
- Byreddy Rajasekhara Reddy
- Gowru Charitha Reddy
- M. Venkat Reddy
- Patlolla Krishna Reddy
- M. Vijayapal Reddy
- Mahareddy Bhupal Reddy
- Patlolla Sanjeeva Reddy
- Yelkoti Yella Reddy
- S. Rajender Reddy
- Chittem Parnika Reddy
- K. Sanjeeva Reddy
- Kammampati Laxma Reddy
- Peddi Sudarshan Reddy
- Donthi Madhava Reddy
- Revuri Prakash Reddy
- Chilumula Vittal Reddy
- Vakiti Sunitha Laxma Reddy
- Chilumula Madan Reddy
- Kasu Brahmananda Reddy
- Dondeti Krishna Reddy
- Kasu Venkata Krishna Reddy
- Gopireddy Srinivasa Reddy
- Anam Vivekananda Reddy
- Kotamreddy Sridhar Reddy
- Mungamuru Sridhara Krishna Reddy
- Koripally Muthyam Reddy
- P. Narsa Reddy
- Poddutoori Ganga Reddy
- Nall Indrakaran Reddy
- Allola Indrakaran Reddy
- Alleti Maheshwar Reddy
- Balreddy Anantha Reddy
- Gaddam Ganga Reddy
- Rekulapally Bhoopathi Reddy
- Cattamanchi Ramalinga Reddy
- Balineni Srinivasa Reddy
- Ramreddy Venkat Reddy
- Kandala Upender Reddy
- Ponguleti Srinivas Reddy
- Mamidala Yashaswini Reddy
- N. Amaranatha Reddy
- Veera Reddy
- Erasu Ayyapu Reddy
- Challa Ramakrishna Reddy
- Katasani Rambhupal Reddy
- Bijjam Partha Sarathi Reddy
- Gowru Charitha Reddy
- Gade Venkata Reddy
- Jagan Mohan Reddy
- M. Rama Deva Reddy
- Kamatam Ram Reddy
- Koppula Harishwar Reddy
- Koppula Mahesh Reddy
- T. Ram Mohan Reddy
- C. J. Reddy
- Pingali Dharma Reddy
- Challa Dharma Reddy
- Revuri Prakash Reddy
- Gudem Mahipal Reddy
- Ganapa Ramaswamy Reddy
- Jinna Malla Reddy
- G. Raji Reddy
- Kalva Ramachandra Reddy
- Geetla Mukunda Reddy
- Gujjula Ramakrishna Reddy
- Dasari Manohar Reddy
- Lakshminarayana Reddy
- Chithambara Reddy
- Narasi Reddy
- Somandepalli Narayan Reddy
- S. Ramachandra Reddy
- Sane Chenna Reddy
- Sane Venkata Ramana Reddy
- P. Thimma Reddy
- C. K. Narayan Reddy
- Challa Prabhakar Reddy
- G. V. Srinath Reddy
- N. Kiran Kumar Reddy
- Chintala Ramachandra Reddy
- N. Kishore Kumar Reddy
- Tamma Kotamma Reddy
- Karumuru Lakshminarayana Reddy
- Kundala Balanarayana Reddy
- Ramireddy Chandra Obul Reddy
- Panyam Yerra Muni Reddy
- Rajulapalle Rama Subba Reddy
- Mallela Venkata Ramana Reddy
- Nandyala Varada Rajulu Reddy
- Mallela Linga Reddy
- Rachamallu Siva Prasad Reddy
- Penchikala Basi Reddy
- Chavva Bali Reddy
- Y. S. Rajasekhara Reddy
- Y. S. Vivekananda Reddy
- Y. S. Purushottam Reddy
- Y. S. Vijaya Lakshmi Reddy
- Y. S. Jagan Mohan Reddy
- V. Ramaswamy Reddy
- Nuthanakalva Ramakrishna Reddy
- N. Amarnath Reddy
- Peddireddy Ramachandra Reddy
- Palle Raghunatha Reddy
- Duddukunta Sreedhar Reddy
- Palle Sindhura Reddy
- Panjam Narasimha Reddy
- Kondur Mara Reddy
- Kasireddi Madan Mohan Reddy
- Akepati Amarnath Reddy
- Meda Venkata Mallikarjuna Reddy
- Thopudurthi Prakash Reddy
- Y. Adinarayana Reddy
- Rachamalla Narayana Reddy
- M. K. Reddy
- Mandipalli Nagi Reddy
- M. Narayana Reddy
- Gadikota Srikanth Reddy
- Mandipalli Ramprasad Reddy
- P. Ramachandra Reddy
- Narasimha Reddy
- K. Sadasiva Reddy
- Jagga Reddy
- Chitturu Venkata Sesha Reddy
- Penchala Reddy Chenna Reddy
- Eduru Ramakrishna Reddy
- Somireddy Chandra Mohan Reddy
- Adala Prabhakara Reddy
- Kakani Govardhan Reddy
- Damodara Reddy
- Chowlapally Pratap Reddy
- Adla Guruva Reddy
- M. Shankar Reddy
- Adduru Balarami Reddy
- Neelam Sanjiva Reddy
- Bojjala G. S. Reddy
- Adduru Dasradha Rami Reddy
- Tatiparthi Chenchu Reddy
- Bojjala Gopala Krishna Reddy
- Biyyapu Madhusudhan Reddy
- Bojjala Sudhir Reddy
- Erasu Pratap Reddy
- Budda Rajasekhar Reddy
- Silpa Chakrapani Reddy
- Bhimreddy Narasimha Reddy
- Ramreddy Damodar Reddy
- Guntakandla Jagadish Reddy
- C. Kulasekhara Reddy
- Diddekunta Venkata Reddy
- M. Kesava Reddy
- J. C. Diwakar Reddy
- J. C. Prabhakar Reddy
- Kethireddy Pedda Reddy
- J. C. Ashmit Reddy
- Marri Chenna Reddy
- Patlolla Mahender Reddy
- Pilot Rohith Reddy
- Buyyani Manohar Reddy
- T. N. Venkatasubba Reddy
- Kadapa Narasimha Reddy
- T. N. Anasuyamma
- Avula Mohana Reddy
- T. N. Srinivas Reddy
- Kalicherla Prabhakar Reddy
- Anipireddi Venkata Lakshmi Devamma
- Kalicherla Prabhakar Reddy
- Anipireddi Venkata Praveen Kumar Reddy
- Peddireddy Dwarakanatha Reddy
- P. Venkata Reddy
- Mekapati Rajamohan Reddy
- Kambam Vijaya Rami Reddy
- Mekapati Chandrasekhar Reddy
- Bandari Raji Reddy
- Bethi Subhas Reddy
- Bandari Lakshma Reddy
- Y. Bheema Reddy
- Yellareddi Gari Sivarami Reddy
- Y. Visweswara Reddy
- Padileti Venkataswami Reddy
- Srinivasulu Reddy Nallapareddy
- Nallareddy Chandrasekhara Reddy
- Nedurumalli Janardhana Reddy
- Nedurumalli Rajyalakshmi Janardhana Reddy
- Anam Ramanarayana Reddy
- Dodda Balakoti Reddy
- Yarram Venkateswara Reddy
- Suravaram Pratap Reddy
- Padmanabha Reddy
- G. Chinna Reddy
- Ravula Chandra Sekar Reddy
- Singireddy Niranjan Reddy
- Tudi Megha Reddy
- Naini Rajender Reddy
- Eanugu Ravinder Reddy
- Hanumantha Reddy
- Kotla Vijaya Bhaskara Reddy
- B. V. Mohan Reddy
- K. Chennakesava Reddy
- Jaya Nageswara Reddy
- J. Rami Reddy
- Kandula Obul Reddy
- Mogaligundla Baga Reddy
- Patlolla Narasimha Reddy
- J. Geeta Reddy
- Gujjula Ravindra Reddy – Mayor of Altlandsberg (Germany) and Member of State Parliament, Brandenburg, Germany
- Mahendra Reddy – Ex Cabinet Minister, Government of Fiji
- S. Raja Reddy – MLA of Tamil Nadu, Communist Party of India

== Leaders, activists, reformers and philanthropists ==
- Arutla Ramchandra Reddy – Indian freedom fighter and Telangana movement leader
- Bhimreddy Narasimha Reddy – a leader of the Telangana Rebellion
- Chandra Pulla Reddy – Indian communist leader
- Gona Ganna Reddy – ruler of the Vaddemani Kingdom
- Raja Bahadur Venkatarama Reddy (1869–1953) – Kotwal of Hyderabad, founder of Reddy Hostel
- T. Nagi Reddy (1917–1976) – Communist politician from Andhra Pradesh, India
- Uyyalawada Narasimha Reddy – led the first popular revolt against British occupation in 1847
- V. Ramachandra Reddy – first donor of land during Bhoodhan Movement

== Film Industry ==
=== Dadasaheb Phalke Award ===
#	Year (Ceremony)	Name
1	1974 (22nd NFA)	B. Narasimha Reddy
2	1986 (34th NFA)	B. Nagi Reddy

=== Producers, Directors and Actors ===
- A. Kodandarami Reddy, director
- B. Nagi Reddy, producer, Dadasaheb Phalke awardee
- B. V. Nandini Reddy, director
- Bharath Reddy, actor
- B. N. Reddy, director, first Dadasaheb Phalke Award recipient from South India
- Dil Raju (born Velamakucha Venkata Ramana Reddy), producer
- H. M. Reddy, producer, director of first South Indian talkie movie
- K. V. Reddy, director, screenwriter, and producer
- Kartikeya Gummakonda, actor
- Keerthi Reddy, actress
- Kiran Abbavaram, actor
- M. Prabhakar Reddy, actor
- Madhura Sreedhar Reddy, director, producer, and distributor
- Nag Ashwin Reddy, director, screenwriter, producer
- Nithiin (born Nithin Kumar Reddy), actor
- Pattabhirama Reddy Tikkavarapu, producer and director
- Raam Reddy, director
- Ramana Reddy, actor and comedian
- Rami Reddy, actor
- Rasool Ellore, cinematographer
- S. Gopala Reddy, cinematographer
- S. V. Krishna Reddy, director, musician
- Sameer Reddy, cinematographer
- Sameera Reddy, actress
- Sandeep Reddy Vanga, director, screenwriter, and editor
- Sankalp Reddy, director and screenwriter
- Siva Reddy, actor, mimicry
- Sriya Reddy, actress
- Sujeeth, director
- Surender Reddy, director
- Swathi Reddy, actress
- V. N. Reddy
- Vikram Krishna Reddy, producer, actor
- Vishal (Vishal Krishna Reddy), actor
- Vaibhav Reddy, actor
- Sriman (born Kumaravatha Srinivasa Reddy), actor

== Artists ==
- Pakhal Tirumal Reddy, artist
- Krishna Reddy, artist & master print maker

== Singers ==
- S. V. Krishna Reddy, Indian music composer and singer

== Other ==
- Krishna Reddy (artist), printmaker and sculptor
- Laxman Reddy – bodybuilder, Mr. World 2010
- Malla Reddy, educationist, politician
- Prem Reddy, businessman
- Sashi Reddi, CEO and founder, AppLabs
- T Venkattram Reddy, businessman
- Umesh Reddy, serial killer and rapist from India
- Yamini Reddy – Kuchipudi

== See also ==
- Reddy (disambiguation)
- Ready (surname)
