= Sangeeta Boochra =

Sangeeta Boochra is an eponymous fashion label founded in 1994, named after Indian jewelry designer Sangeeta Biochar. The label is known for its traditional and tribal designer jewelry collections.

== History and description ==
In 1897, Seth Kistoor Chand Boochra at Jaipur, India started "Bullion Trading Company," primarily dealing with the trading and conventional trade of silver. Seth Kistoor served as the organization's president for four decades and was known as 'The Silver King of India.' In 1960, his son Seth Lalit Kumar Boochra converted the bullion trading business into a jewelry manufacturing unit. In 1994, Sangeeta Boochra joined her father-in-law's business and created the label Sangeeta Boochra.

Sangeeta was born in Sujangarh and later moved to Guwahati with her family. She married Sudeep Boochra, who is a gem exporter and presently the director of Bullion association limited. Since 2016, She is working as the managing director of both Silverr Centre and her eponymous fashion brand Sangeeta Boochra. Currently, her son Abhineet Boochra serves as one of the directors and the spokesperson of the brand. The label presently has 45 stores across India, with three manufacturing units and design studios.

The jewelry of Sangeeta Boochra are found to be worn and endorsed by several Hollywood and Bollywood actresses and celebrities. The jewelry label made appearances in Bollywood movies like Luka Chuppi, Veere Di Wedding, The Zoya Factor etc. The label first appeared at Lakme Fashion Week in 2011.

== Additional sources ==
- Salon International, May 2020, Vol 12, No 5,
- Haute Brides and Honeymoons: June July 2015. N.p., Pioneer Book Co. Pvt. Ltd., 2015.
- Solitaire, May 2018, Page 57
- New Woman: October 2015. N.p., Pioneer Book Co. Pvt. Ltd., 2015. Page 66
- Elle India, January 2018
- Perfect Woman, Vol-VIII, Issue V, May 2019, Page 66
- Verve, Oct-Nov 2019, Page 126-135
- Art of Jewelry, Vol.19, Issue 2, Designer of the Month, Page 79
- Art of Jewelry, Vol. 19, Issue 7, Page 79-87.
- Flaunt, The New Indian Express, 21 June 2020
- The Retail Jewelry Market, July–August 2014
- Adorn Magazine, Sep-Oct, 2014
- Financial Chronicle, 7 May 2014
- Indian Jeweler, Vol 6, Issue 5, Jun-July 2015
- Solitaire International, August 2020
- Jewelry News India, Sep-Oct 2017, Page 64-67
- New Woman, Sep 2017, Page 26
- The Vogue Wedding Book 2017, Page 92
- Solitaire, November 2018, Page 78.
- Fermina Wedding Times, May 2017, Page 28-34.
