= Baddam =

Baddam (Telugu: బద్దం) is a Telugu surname. Notable people with this surname include:

- Baddam Bal Reddy (1945–2019), Indian politician
- Baddam Narsimha Reddy (1936–2017), Indian politician
- Baddam Yella Reddy (1906–1979), Indian politician
