= Yogi Vemana University =

University in India

Coordinates: 14.473786°N 78.711482°E

- Type: Public
- Established: 2006
- Affiliations: UGC
- Chancellor: Governor of Andhra Pradesh
- Vice-Chancellor: Raja Shekhar Bellamkonda
- Location: Kadapa, Andhra Pradesh, India
- Campus: Rural
- Website: yvu.edu.in

Yogi Vemana University is a university in the Kadapa district with its West Campus at Idupulapaya. Earlier, it was a part of Sri Venkateswara University. It is named after a great thinker, philosopher, and social reformer Yogi Vemana, a Telugu poet and philosopher.

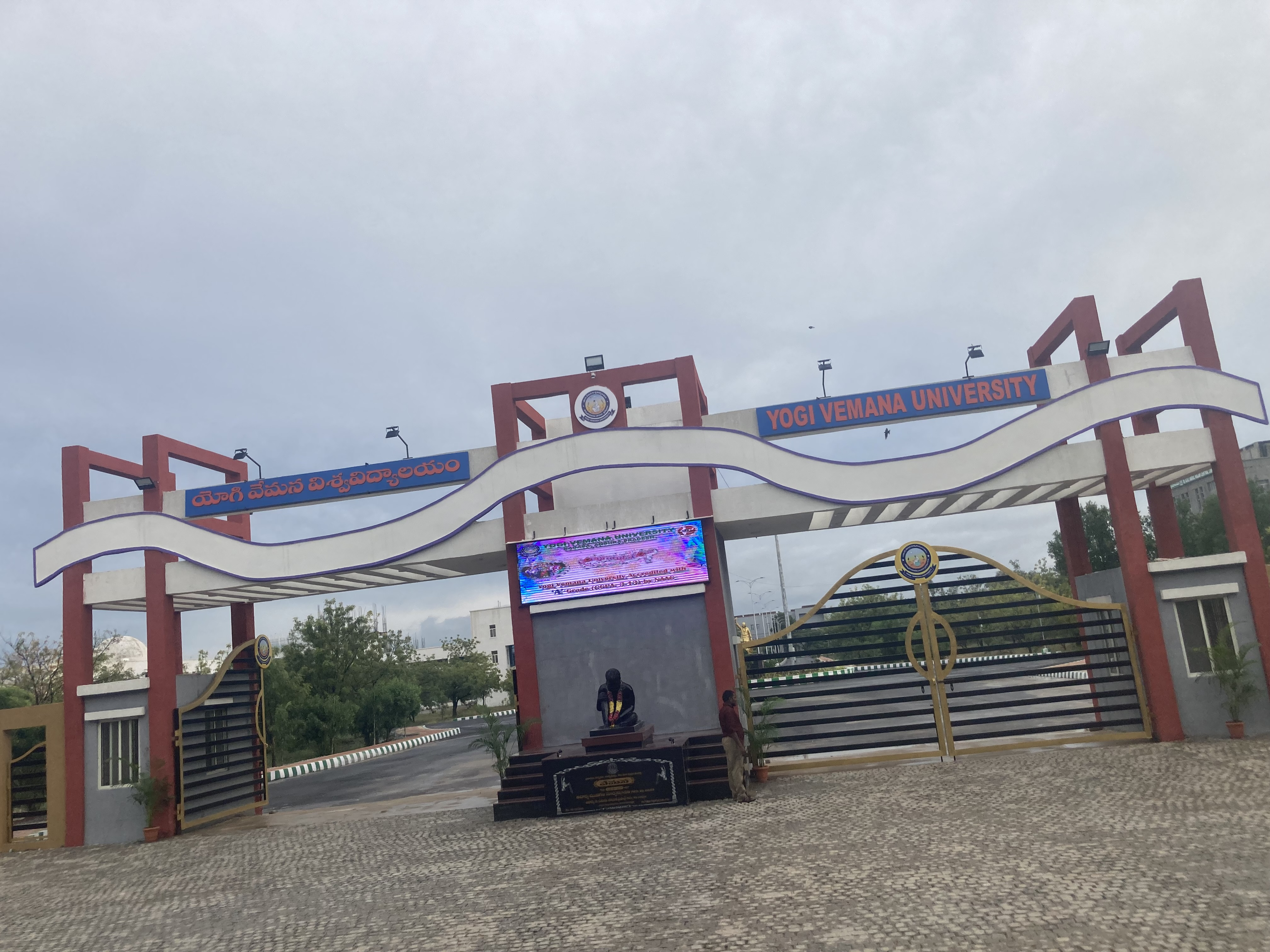
Yogi Vemana University Entrance

It is located at Mittamedipalli village and Panchayat about 15 km from the Kadapa on the Kadapa-Pulivendla road. The campus is spread over 450 acres (1.8 km^{2}) of land.

== Academics ==
Yogi Vemana University has 15 departments offering courses at post graduate level in 17 disciplines in languages/humanities/physical and bio-sciences, human resources management, MBA & MCA and new sciences like biotechnology, bioinformatics, geoinformatics and earth sciences. The university has also introduced five-year integrated MSc courses in earth sciences and bioinformatics in the year 2007–08.

C.P. Brown Library has a collection of rare books, ancient documents and relics. Situated in Kadapa, it is part of Yogi Vemana University providing research facilities in several disciplines. The library has rare collection of manuscripts of 11th century.

== Engineering campus ==
Yogi Vemana University College of Engineering, Proddatur was established in 2008–2009 and renamed as YSR Engineering College of Yogi Vemana University in the year 2010. It offers six conventional disciplines of Civil, Computer Science, Electronics & Communications, Information Technology, Mechanical and Electrical & Electronics Engineering leading to the Degree of Bachelor of Engineering. Along with the above the college is offered a new course in "Metallurgical Engineering" from the ensuing academic year.

There are six engineering courses in that college. Metallurgy and material technology (MMT), computer science engineering, civil engineering, mechanical engineering, electric and electronic engineering, electronics and communication engineering. The principal of this college is B. Jayarami Reddy.

== Achievements ==
Yogi Vemana University was ranked 92 in India's Top 100 Universities. Yogi Vemana University also got 'B' grade Accreditation By National Assessment and Accreditation Council.

== Notable people ==
- Rachapalem Chandrasekhara Reddy, winner of the 2014 Kendra Sahitaya Academy Award in Telugu language
