= B. Ramakrishna Reddy =

Indian linguist

Bandi Ramarkrishna Reddy
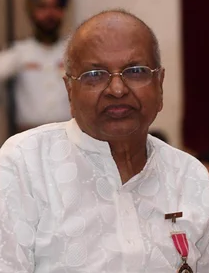
- Born: 12 August 1942 (age 84); Rentalachenu
- Awards: Padma Shri

Academic background
- Education: Sri Venkateswara University; University of Edinburgh (PhD)
- Thesis: Localist studies in Telugo syntax (1977)

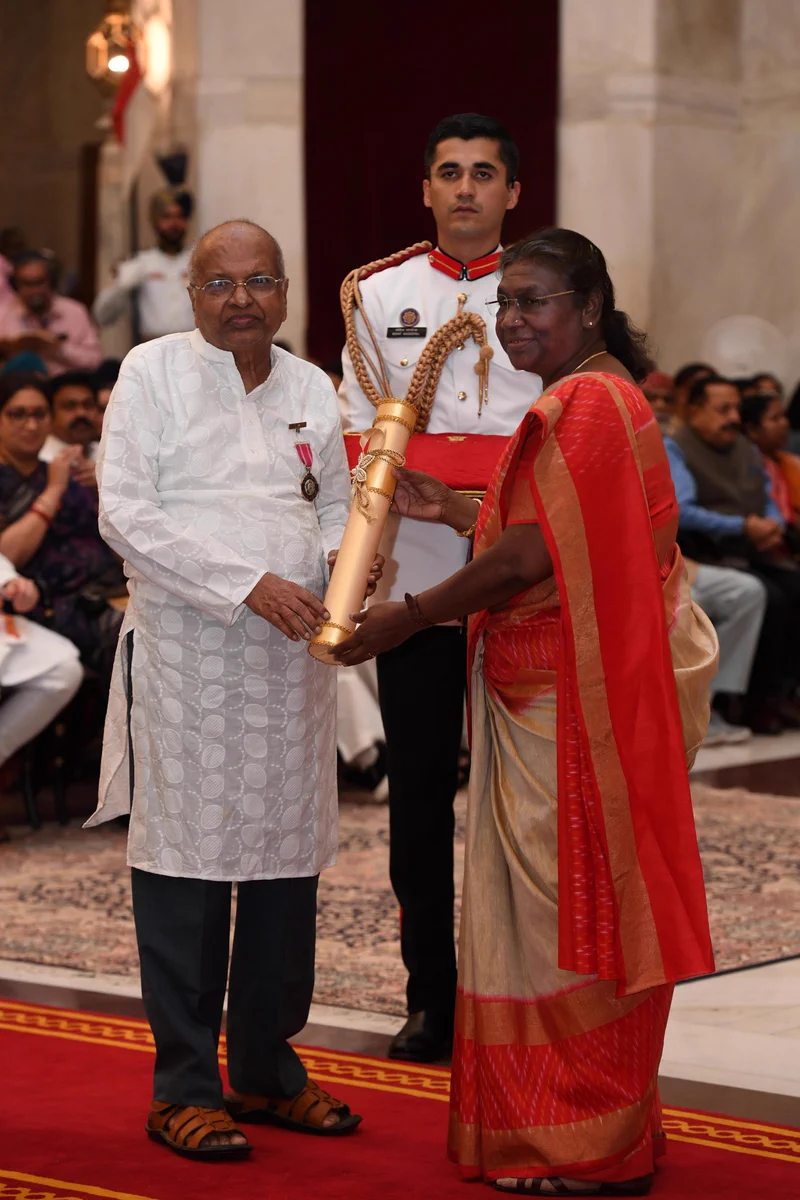
President Droupadi Murmu presents Padma Shri to Dr. Reddy for Literature & Education

Bandi Ramakrishna Reddy is an Indian linguist, known for his work on conservation of endangered languages including Kuvi, Manda, and Kui. He is a professor at Osmania University.

== Biography ==
He was born in Rentalachenu. He completed his bachelor's and master's degrees from Sri Venkateswara University. He subsequently joined the Deccan College and obtained a degree in linguistics.

Between 1970 and 1972, he worked at the Central Institute of Indian Languages. In 1972, he was awarded the Commonwealth Scholarship, and proceeded to the University of Edinburgh for doctoral studies. During his doctorate, he was supervised by Ronald E. Asher. He obtained a PhD in 1977 presenting the thesis "Localist studies in Telugu syntax".

Between 1977 and 1990, he worked at the Department of Linguistics at Osmania University. Afterwards, he joined the Potti Sreeramulu Telugu University. He was awarded the Padma Shri in 2023.

== Works ==
In 1995, he co-authored the Kuvi-Oriya-English dictionary.

In 2009, he published a Manda-English dictionary.

== Personal life ==
He was married to Professor Nagamma Reddy. He has a daughter named Padmini Bandi who is married to Reddy Chetan Nagarimadugu.

== Awards and honours ==
- Honorary D. Litt. conferred by the Deccan College, 2014
- Padma Shri
