= Financial Chronicle =

Indian newspaper

- Type: Daily newspaper
- Format: Broadsheet
- Owner: Deccan Chronicle Holdings Ltd.
- Editor-in-chief: Shubhrangshu Roy
- Founded: 16 April 2008
- Political alignment: Right-wing
- Language: English
- Headquarters: 36, Sarojini Devi Road, Hyderabad, India
- Sister newspapers: Deccan Chronicle
- OCLC number: 724145224
- Website: epaper.mydigitalfc.com

Financial Chronicle (FC) is an Indian English-language daily newspaper published since 2008. The newspaper primarily covers Indian economic and international business topics, and financial news and issues.

== Edition ==
Financial Chronicle, edited by Shubhrangshu Roy, was simultaneously launched from Hyderabad and Chennai on 16 April 2008. The Bangalore edition was launched on 25 May, and the Mumbai edition on 20 June. With the launch of the New Delhi edition on 14 April 2009, Financial Chronicle completed its launch objective of five-city simultaneous publication within its first year.

Financial Chronicle's e-paper was launched midnight of 15–16 April 2008. This makes FC the first paper to be launched electronically on the internet before its print launch. FC began its journey five days-a-week, Monday through Friday. It launched a weekend tabloid edition beginning 10 September 2011.

Financial Chronicle also publishes four weekly all-colour feature sections.

== Format ==
Financial Chronicle is a business broadsheet printed in white newsprint in 20 pages format on Mondays, Tuesdays, Thursdays and Fridays and 16 pages format on Wednesdays. Its weekend issue is published in 32 pages in tabloid format on Saturdays.

== Management ==
The paper is owned by Deccan Chronicle Holdings Limited (listed on Bombay Stock Exchange and the National Stock Exchange). Its flagship publication is Deccan Chronicle - an English daily widely circulated in Andhra Pradesh and is the second largest English daily in Chennai. Deccan Chronicle is also published in Bangalore.

At launch, Financial Chronicle set up an editorial advisory board that included agricultural scientist M. S. Swaminathan, and eminent public personalities including, former telecom regulator Nripendra Misra, Mindtree founder Subroto Bagchi and Lok Sabha MP Sachin Pilot. T. Venkattram Reddy is chairman of the company. FC was the first Indian business daily to have an ombudsman. Former Securities and Exchange Board of India chairman M. Damodaran was the first ombudsman. Shubhrangshu Roy is chief operating officer and editor-in-chief.

== Associate partner ==
Financial Chronicle had a tie-up with the International Herald Tribune which published the IHT World Business with Reuters as a four-page daily add-on, incorporating international news, views, analyses and features. The association ended with the global withdrawal of the International Herald Tribune as a newspaper brand and its replacement with the International New York Times.
