= Gayatri Reddy (socialite) =

Indian socialite (born 1986)

- Born: 21 September 1986 (age 40); Hyderabad, India
- Education: University College London, B.Sc honours in construction management
- Occupations: Sports promoter, socialite, journalist
- Employer: Deccan Chronicle
- Parent: T Venkattram Reddy

Gayatri Reddy (born 21 September 1986) is known primarily as the face and owner of the now-defunct Deccan Chargers franchise of the Indian Premier League. She is the daughter of T Venkattram Reddy, owner of the Deccan Chronicle.

When the Indian Premier League started in 2008, Gayatri helped her father build the Deccan Chargers team. She picked players for the team, and became a constant presence at the team's games, "adding a refreshing dose of glamour," according to one writer for India Today.

Gayatri Reddy studied at University College London, where she received a B.Sc. honours in construction management. As of 2013, she is a features editor for the Deccan Chronicle newspaper. She writes on "travel, fashion, sports and cuisine, and interviews celebrities."
