= Laxman Reddy =

Indian bodybuilder

Laxman Reddy is an Indian professional bodybuilder from Hyderabad, Telangana State, India. He won the Mr. World 2010 bodybuilding championships being held in Las Vegas (USA). He has won 13 titles in India and abroad.

He is making his Muscle Mania, MM Pro debut at MM World in Las Vegas this year. He is also a co-partner and trainer at the SweatZone gym in Begumpet in Hyderabad. Laxman Reddy was born in Pedda Amberpet(v) Ranga Reddy Dist, Telangana. He has one elder and one younger sister. He finished schooling from Rajasree Vidya Mandir. He is also a national volleyball player.
