= Deccan Chronicle =

Indian English-language daily newspaper

- Type: Daily newspaper
- Format: Broadsheet
- Owner: Deccan Chronicle Holdings Limited
- Editor-in-chief: Kaushik Mitter
- Founded: 1938
- Language: English
- Headquarters: 36, Sarojini Devi Road, Secunderabad, Telangana, India
- Sister newspapers: Financial Chronicle; The Asian Age; Andhra Bhoomi (defunct)
- OCLC number: 302708964
- Website: deccanchronicle.com

Deccan Chronicle is an English-language daily newspaper based in Hyderabad, India. Founded in 1938, it was initially launched as a weekly and later converted into a daily. The newspaper's name reflects its origins in the Deccan region of India. Deccan Chronicle is owned by Samagrah Commercial Pvt Limited and published by Deccan Chronicle Holdings Limited (DCHL).

Deccan Chronicle has historically been one of the largest and most influential English dailies in the region, with editions in Andhra Pradesh, Telangana, Chennai, and Bengaluru. Despite facing financial challenges, including significant debt and the impact of digital media, Deccan Chronicle remains an important publication, primarily serving readers in the southern states of India.

In addition to Deccan Chronicle, DCHL also publishes Financial Chronicle, a financial newspaper, and The Asian Age, an English-language daily. Additionally, it published the Telugu daily Andhra Bhoomi from 1960 until 2020.

== History ==
=== Founding ===
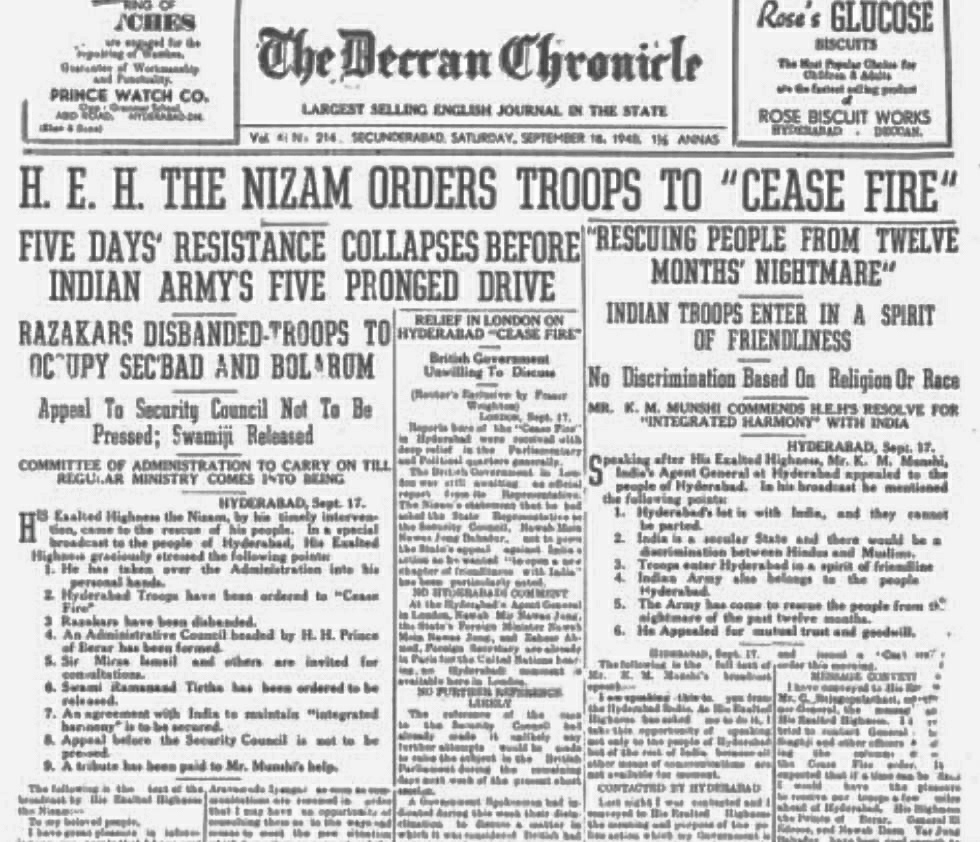
The front page of Deccan Chronicle on 18 September 1948

Deccan Chronicle was founded in 1938. The paper was initially owned by Rajagopal Mudaliar, a paper supplier to the Nizam of Hyderabad's press.

The company launched its flagship newspaper, Deccan Chronicle, as a weekly, which was later converted into a daily. In 1960, the group launched the Telugu daily Andhra Bhoomi with Govinduni Rama Sastri (Gora Sastri) as the editor.

=== Acquisition by Tikkavarapu family ===
Over the decades, Deccan Chronicle became one of the largest and most influential English dailies in the region. In 1977, the newspaper faced financial difficulties and was sold to Tikkavarapu Chandrashekhar Reddy, who modernized its operations. Under the leadership of Chandrashekhar Reddy's son, T. Venkattram Reddy, the paper saw significant growth, expanding its circulation and editions to cities like Chennai (2005), Bangalore (2008), Coimbatore (2010), and Kochi (2011), with the circulation reaching over 2,95,000 copies in Chennai by 2006. In 2005, DCHL acquired Asian Age Holdings, and in 2008, launched Financial Chronicle, a financial newspaper. In its prime, Deccan Chronicle dominated the local advertising market in Hyderabad, and by 2012, it was the fourth-largest English newspaper in India.

At its peak, Deccan Chronicle had expanded its operations to 11 editions across Andhra Pradesh, Tamil Nadu, and Telangana, as well as three editions in Kerala (Cochin, Calicut, and Thiruvananthapuram). The newspaper was considered a leader in the undivided Andhra Pradesh market, competing with The Hindu, The New Indian Express, and The Times of India.

=== Financial challenges and decline ===
Despite its growth, Deccan Chronicle’s rapid expansion led to significant financial challenges. The newspaper's parent company, Deccan Chronicle Holdings Limited (DCHL), which also owned the Indian Premier League (IPL) team Deccan Chargers, accumulated a massive debt of ₹4,000 crore. This financial burden, combined with mismanagement, led to a decline in profits starting in 2010. The situation worsened and resulted in the termination of the Deccan Chargers franchise by the Board of Control for Cricket in India (BCCI).

By 2013, DCHL faced severe financial instability, leading to the resignation of six board members and the arrest of T. Venkattram Reddy in 2015 on charges of loan default, forgery, and criminal breach of trust. The newspaper’s circulation and readership declined significantly during this period. The rise of digital media and the changing print market further impacted Deccan Chronicle. Factors such as demonetisation, GST, and a customs duty on newsprint exacerbated the financial strain. In response, Deccan Chronicle closed its editions in Bengaluru and Kerala on 27 December 2019, and shut down its Mumbai operations of The Asian Age.

Today, Deccan Chronicle remains an important newspaper in Andhra Pradesh and Telangana, offering news and analysis. It continues to serve as a platform for advertisers, particularly in the regions of Hyderabad, Vijayawada, Visakhapatnam, Anantapur, Karimnagar, Nellore, and Coimbatore.

== Deccan Chargers ==
The Deccan Chargers, an Indian Premier League (IPL) cricket franchise representing Hyderabad, was owned by Deccan Chronicle Holdings Limited (DCHL). The franchise was initially managed by Venkattram Reddy's daughter, Gayatri Reddy and WPP GroupM.

In 2012, DCHL's ownership of the Deccan Chargers was transferred to Samagrah Commercial Pvt Limited and the Committee of Creditors. On 14 September 2012, the IPL Governing Council terminated the franchise for breaching contract terms. Following this, Sun TV Network won the bid for the Hyderabad franchise and the new team was named as Sunrisers Hyderabad.

However, in July 2020, a Bombay High Court-appointed arbitration tribunal ruled that the termination of the Deccan Chargers by the BCCI was illegal. The tribunal awarded Deccan Chronicle Holdings Ltd. a compensation of ₹4814.67 crore, plus 10% interest from 2012.

== See also ==
- Financial Chronicle – published by Deccan Chronicle and International Herald Tribune
- List of newspapers in India by circulation
- List of newspapers in the world by circulation
- List of newspapers in India
