= Sunkireddy Narayana Reddy =

Sunkireddy Narayana Reddy is a poet, writer, researcher and a retired principal from Nalgonda, India who is the author of books like Mattadi, Ganuma, Mungili, and Telangana Charitra. He won the B.N. Sastry award and an award in the "Litterateurs" category on the occasion of the first formation day of Telangana state. His book "Telangana Charitra" is now included in the syllabus for M.A. History and Group II.

== Personal life ==
Narayana Reddy is married to Hemalatha and has three daughters. He is now working on his research associated with University Grants Commission (UGC), Delhi.
