= Arjula Ramachandra Reddy =

Indian biologist

Arjula Ramachandra Reddy is a biologist who did research in the field of genetics and plant biotechnology. He is a Fellow of the Indian Academy of Sciences, Bangalore.

He is an Alexander von Humboldt Fellow, Germany, at Max Planck Institute fur Zichtungsforsching, Cologne (1885–87), Rockefeller Foundation (US) Carrier Biotechnology Fellow (2000–2001), at Purdue University, US.

After obtaining a Ph. D., from Osmania University, he moved on to the US, where he did research in genetics both at Iowa State University and Johns Hopkins University. He then joined the faculty of the University of Hyderabad in 1978, and has been at the university since. Reddy played an important role in establishing several national and international collaborations, and developing advanced research programs using cutting-edge technologies such as functional genomics, association genetics and genetic engineering.

He is the first vice-chancellor of Yogi Vemana University Kadapa; A. P., India, from 2006 to 2009 and also during a second term from 2010 to 2013. He was co-chair of National Genetic Engineering Committee, from 2009 to 2012, of Ministry of Science and Technology, Govt. Of India. He served as a member of the Review Committee on Genetic Manipulation of the Department of Biotechnology, Ministry of Science and Technology, India; Science Panel member, the Department for International Development/ Biotechnology and Biological Sciences Research Council (DFID/BBSRC) of the UK Government, from 2006 to 2007. He is currently a member of board of governors, National Institute of Technology, Warangal, AP, India. His research interests are: capturing differentially expressed genes during drought stress, cloning and functional analysis of promoter regions of target genes of drought response; isolation and characterization of family of drought-responsive transcriptional activators; study of processes and pathways that are common to drought, salt and submergence; expression profiling of stress responsive genes. Currently, he is a professor emeritus, School of Life Sciences, University of Hyderabad, TS, India. He has more than 50 publications to his credit in reputed international and national peer-reviewed journals. He has guided 25 Ph.D. students besides training huge number of postgraduate students. He is currently working on genome analysis of lice and the application of NextGen Sequencing Technologies in Crop Improvement.
