= T. Venkattram Reddy =

Indian newspaper chairman

- Born: India
- Occupations: Publisher, media executive
- Years active: 1980s–2010s
- Known for: Chairman of Deccan Chronicle owner of Deccan Chargers IPL franchise
- Notable work: Expansion of Deccan Chronicle; founding of Financial Chronicle and Asian Age editions
- Title: Former Chairman, Deccan Chronicle
- Children: Gayatri Reddy

T. Venkattram Reddy is a former newspaper baron and the former chairman of the Deccan Chronicle, or DC as it is often referred to.

He lost his company DCHL, to SREI & CoC which will change the composition of the DCHL Management. With the changing TIMES, Srei Multiple Asset Investment Trust (Vision India Fund) will NOW take Full Control of his company.

It is the third highest in Hyderabad circulation English-language daily newspaper in India especially in Deccan area from where it derives its name, with a readership of over 1.1 million.

Published in Hyderabad, India by Deccan Chronicle Holdings Limited. During his hay days, he owned the IPL franchise Deccan Chargers. T.V.Reddy was also elected by The Indian Newspaper Society as President for the year 2009-10, succeeding Hormusji N. Cama of Bombay Samachar Weekly. Gayatri Reddy is his daughter.

== Career profile ==
T. Venkattram Reddy spearheaded the Deccan Chronicle from the young age of 21. His sibling, T Vinayak Ravi Reddy, used to manage and operate Deccan Chronicle from 1970s, when he took over. T. Venkattram Reddy's, now defunct team Deccan Chargers won the IPL trophy for the 2009 season. Under the Deccan Chargers banner they used to run year-round sports activities in schools and colleges to promote sports and find talent. The last 20 years has seen a remarkable turnaround for Deccan Chronicle – from a modest regional paper to a paper of national repute & in recent TIMES it also witnessed the worst era, since its inception. He used to run a group of publications under the DCHL platform: Deccan Chronicle – the largest English newspaper by circulation in South India, published from 7 centres in AP, Chennai and Bengaluru; The Asian Age – which has editions in New Delhi, Mumbai, Kolkota and London; Financial Chronicle – the business daily which is published from New Delhi, Hyderabad, Mumbai, Chennai and Bangalore; Andhra Bhoomi – a Telugu newspaper, published from Hyderabad and six centers in Andhra Pradesh; Andhra Bhoomi Sachitra Vara Patrika – a weekly general interest magazine that serialises stories from eminent writers; Andhra Bhoomi Sachitra Masa Patrika – a monthly Telugu magazine which carries novels and novellas by well-known writers; Andhra Bhoomi Panchangam – a widely followed annual almanac for Andhra Pradesh.

His contribution towards the Hyderabad Race Club has been significant and currently he owns several horses at the Malakpet stable. His horses participate in the races in Bangalore, Mumbai, Hyderabad, etc. on a regular basis and have won many trophies. He also has a museum with lot of artefacts dedicated to the printing press.

He was arrested on 8 February 2015 in Hyderabad by CBI for defaulting on his loans taken using false documents & dozens of cases are still on. The Consortium of Lenders have taken control of DCHL & have sold it to Srei Multiple Asset Investment Trust (Vision India Fund)
