= Enuga Sreenivasulu Reddy =

Diplomat and anti-apartheid activist (1924–2020)

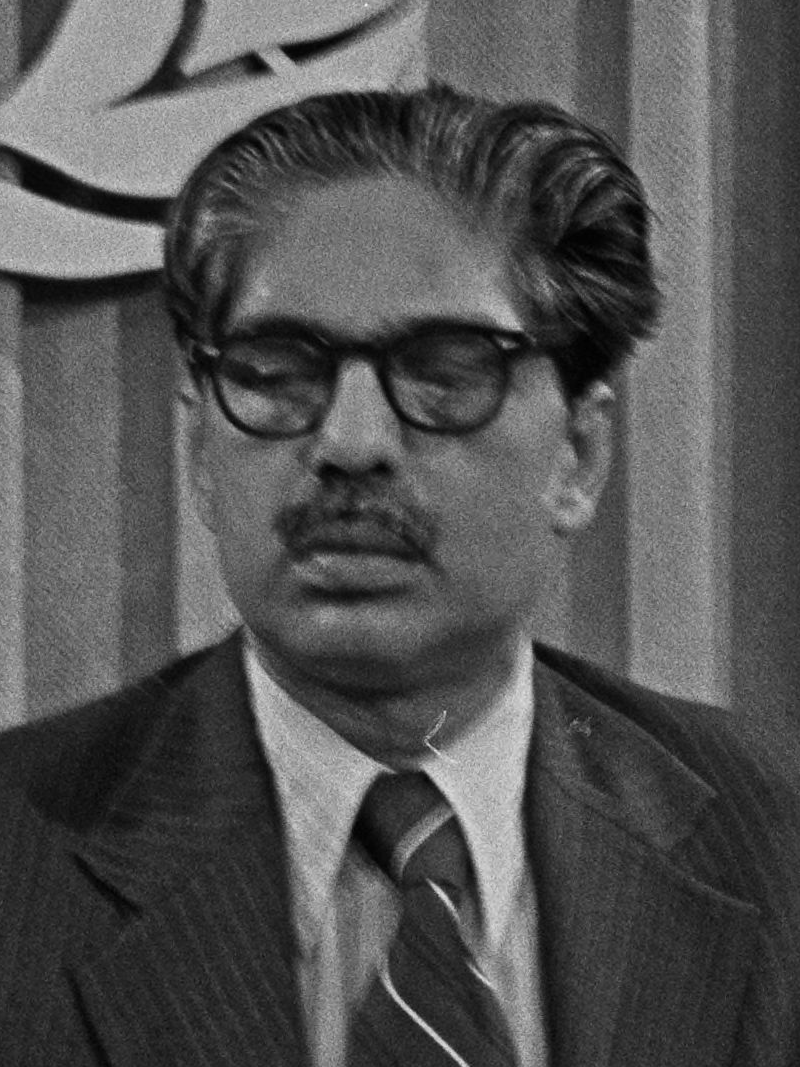
- Reddy in 1975
- Born: 1 July 1924; Pallapalli, Nellore District, Andhra Pradesh, British India
- Died: 1 November 2020 (aged 96); Cambridge, Massachusetts, US
- Occupation: Diplomat at the United Nations
- Known for: Anti-apartheid work
- Awards: Padma Shri (Government of India); Order of the Companions of O. R. Tambo (Government of South Africa)

Enuga Sreenivasulu Reddy, also known as E. S. Reddy (1 July 1924 – 1 November 2020), was an Indian-born diplomat at the United Nations who led the anti-apartheid efforts at the UN's Special Committee Against Apartheid (where he was the secretary from 1963 to 1965) and its Centre Against Apartheid (where he was the director from 1976 to 1983). He also served as director of the UN Trust Fund for South Africa and the Educational and Training Programme for Southern Africa. During his time in these roles, he campaigned for economic boycott of the then Government of South Africa, advancing anti-apartheid actions including a combination of economic and social measures. He also lobbied for the release of the imprisoned leader Nelson Mandela.

He was a recipient of the Padma Shri, India's fourth highest civilian honor, in 2000, and the Order of the Companions of O. R. Tambo from the Government of South Africa in 2013.

== Early life ==
Reddy was born on 1 July 1924 in Pallapatti, in southern India. His father, E. V. Narasa Reddy, was a mining company executive and Indian freedom fighter. He was noted to have participated in campaigns along with Indian anti-colonial nationalist, Mahatma Gandhi, for betterment of treatment meted out to Harijans, considered untouchables in India until then. His father was jailed for participating in Gandhi's protests, while his mother used money from selling her jewelry to support Gandhi's campaigns.

Reddy finished his graduation from the University of Madras in 1943, and went on to complete his master's degree in political science from New York University in 1948. While he initially had an offer from the University of Illinois to pursue a degree in chemical engineering, a shortage of ships sailing from Madras post World War II resulted in a delayed landing in the United States, and subsequently led to him pursuing a degree at New York University.

== Career ==
=== United Nations ===
After an internship at the United Nations, Reddy started his career with the United Nations in 1949 as a political affairs officer. During this period he was also associated with the Council on African Affairs, a volunteer-led organization which was a voice of anti-colonialism and Pan-Africanism, working along with political activists Paul Robeson and W. E. B. Du Bois. His interest in the South African struggle was sparked by a chance encounter with the then president of the African National Congress, A. B. Xuma, who had come to New York to lobby for the movement at the United Nations.

He led the United Nations' efforts against apartheid between 1963 and 1984, in his role as a principal secretary within the Special Committee Against Apartheid, and later as a director at the Center Against Apartheid. During his time in these roles, he campaigned for economic boycott of the then Government of South Africa, with its racially discriminatory practices. During this period he worked with Oliver Tambo, African National Congress leader in exile, in advancing anti-apartheid actions including a combination of economic and social measures. He lobbied for the release of the imprisoned leader Nelson Mandela.

He served as the Assistant Secretary-General of the United Nations between 1983 and 1985. Speaking about his role at the United Nations, Reddy recounted that some of his work was motivated, "by a feeling that I had not made enough sacrifice for India's freedom, so I should compensate by doing what I can for the rest of the colonies." During this time, he further generated awareness against apartheid by convening seminars and international conferences as well as driving campaigns for action against the government. He also instituted scholarships for families of political prisoners in South Africa.

==== Positions ====
Reddy's positions at the United Nations included:

- Principal Secretary, United Nations Special Committee against Apartheid, 1963–1967.
- Chief of Section for African Questions, 1967–1975.
- Director, United Nations Centre against Apartheid, 1976–1984.
- Assistant Secretary-General of the United Nations, 1983–1985.
- Senior fellow, United Nations Institute for Training and Research, 1985–1993.
- Member, Council of Trustees of the International Defence and Aid Fund for Southern Africa, 1986–1992.

=== Post-1985 ===
After his retirement in 1985, he wrote about the early history of the anti-apartheid movements, black liberation, and the linkages between Indian and South African social justice movements. He was a scholar of Mahatma Gandhi's works and edited anthologies of Gandhi's influence on South Africa and America. He helped find letters from Gandhi to anti-apartheid activists and leaders of the South African Indian community, Yusuf Dadoo and Monty Naicker, which helped further identify links between social justice movements in both countries. Some of his works including papers and private collection was donated to Yale University Library, Nehru Memorial Museum & Library, University of the Witwatersrand and University of Durban-Westville. He also served as a consultant to the African National Congress led efforts at the Department of Information to develop its Historical Documents and United Nations collections.

== Awards and recognition ==
Reddy received the Joliot-Curie medal of the World Peace Council in 1982 for his anti-apartheid activities. The Indian government awarded him the Padma Shri, the nation's fourth highest civilian honor in 2000. He was awarded the Order of the Companions of O. R. Tambo by the Government of South Africa in 2013. He received an honorary Doctor of Philosophy from the University of Durban-Westville in 1995 for his work against apartheid in South Africa.

Speaking about Reddy's work, Nobel Peace Prize awardee and former UN Commissioner for Namibia, Seán MacBride said, "There is no one at the United Nations who has done more to expose the injustices of apartheid and the illegality of the South African regime than he has." Indian historian, Ramachandra Guha, dedicated his book Gandhi Before India to Reddy, and noted of him in his dedication, "Indian patriot, South African democrat, friend and mentor to Gandhian scholars of all nationalities."

== Personal life ==
Reddy was married to Nilufer Mizanoglu, a writer and translator of Turkish literature. They had two daughters, Mina Reddy and Leyla Tegmo-Reddy. He died on 1 November 2020 in Cambridge, Massachusetts, at the age of 96.

== Books ==
- Gandhi, Mahatma (1998). Mahatma Gandhi, Letters to Americans: Compiled and Edited by E.S. Reddy. Bharatiya Vidya Bhavan.
- Reddy, E. S. (1987). Struggle for Freedom in Southern Africa: Its International Significance. Mainstream.
- Reddy, E. S. (1986). International Action Against Apartheid: The Nordic States and Nigeria. Nigerian Institute of International Affairs.
- Reddy, E. S., ed.(2006): Friends of Gandhi: Correspondence of Mahatma Gandhi with Esther Faering (Menon), Anne Marie Petersen and Ellen Hørup, by Mahatma Gandhi, Ellen Hørup, Esther Faering Menon, and Anne Marie Petersen, also ed. by Holger Terp. National Gandhi Museum.
