= Solipuram Madhusudhan Reddy =

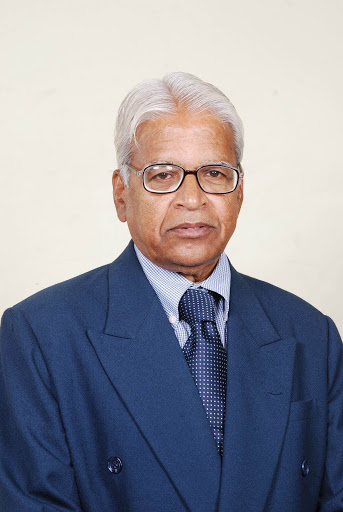
- Born: 15 October 1940 (age 85)
- Other name: S. M. Reddy
- Citizenship: India
- Scientific career
- Author abbrev. (botany): S.M.Reddy

Solipuram Madhusudhan Reddy (popularly known as S M Reddy) was born on 15 October 1940 to Smt. Peddamma and Sri. Laxma Reddy in Errambelli village of Bhuvanagiri mandal, Yadadri-Bhuvanagiri district, Telangana, India

He earned his bachelor’s in botany (1963), took his master's degree in botany from Osmania University (1965) and Ph.D. degree from Jai Narain Vyas University (1968). He did post-doctoral research in the Institute of Microbiology, Prague, Czechoslovakia during 1978-79 and visited different laboratories in Eastern Europe.

He guided more than 40 research students of Ph.D. degree and published more than 500 research papers in various journals. He is a fellow of Indian Phytopathological Society, Indian Society of Mycology and Plant Pathology, Indian Botanical Society and A. P. Academy of Sciences.He is an elected President of Indian Society of Mycology and plant pathology. He has been awarded" Best-Teacher"by Government of Andhra Pradesh and distinguished Teacher of plant – pathology by Indian society of Mycology and plant pathology. He was honored with Dr. P.Maheswhari Medal by Indian Botanical Society. Indian Botanical Society recognized him by conferring editorial excellence award. He has been recognized as distinguished plant pathologist by Indian phytopathological society. He is also on the editorial board of various research journals.

Retired botany professor of Kakatiya University, S.M. Reddy has been elected President of Indian Botanical Society for the year 2016. He took charge on October 27 as president at the annual conference of the society held at University of Rajasthan, Jaipur from Prof. Ashok Bhatnagar of University of Delhi.

He authored and co-authored 30 books in botany, microbiology, and plant pathology.

The standard author abbreviation S.M.Reddy is used to indicate this person as the author when citing a botanical name.
