= Neelapu Rami Reddy =

Indian sprinter

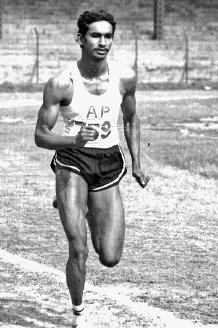
- Reddy in the 1985 South Asian Games, Dhaka

Personal information
- Nationality: Indian
- Born: 1 June 1965 (age 60) Peda Waltair, Visakhapatnam, Andhra Pradesh, India

Sport
- Country: India
- Sport: Track and field

Neelapu Rami Reddy (born 1 June 1965) is a former sprinter and national athletics champion from Andhra Pradesh, India. He dominated national competition for over a decade during the 1980s and the first half of the 1990s. After his retirement from competitive sports in 1994, he was made athletics chief coach by Southern Central Railways (SCR) and sprints coach of the Indian Railways.
