= Sangi Reddy Sanjeeva Reddy =

Indian military engineer (died 2020)

Lance Naik/Sapper Sangi Reddy Sanjeeva Reddy SM
- Born: Prakasam, Andhra Pradesh
- Died: 11 April 2020; Northern Sikkim, India
- Military career
- Allegiance: India
- Branch: Indian Army
- Service years: ?-2020
- Rank: Lance Naik
- Service number: 16121914P
- Unit: 3 Engineer Regiment
- Awards: Sena Medal

Sapper (Lance Naik) Sangi Reddy Sanjeeva Reddy (also known as Sanjeeva Reddy or Sangi Reddy), SM was a Non Commissioned Officer (NCO) in the Engineer Regiment of the Indian Army who posthumously received the Sena Medal, a prestigious gallantry award.

== Early life ==
Sanjeeva Reddy was born in Krishna Shetty Pally village in the Giddaluru Mandal tehsil of Andhra Pradesh's Prakasam District. He joined the Army after finishing high school and was assigned to the 3rd Battalion of the Corps of Engineers, the Indian Army's ground combat support arm.

== North Sikkim Operation ==
Sapper Sangi Reddy Sanjeeva Reddy's unit 3 Engr Regt was stationed along the Indo-China border in North Sikkim in 2020. The unit's AOR (Area of Responsibility) included distant mountainous territory with harsh weather, particularly during the winter season. The troops were stationed at several forward posts and frequently patrolled the region between their positions to keep an eye on the situation. 3 Eng Regt Sapper Sangi Reddy and his mates offered engineering support to troops from other battalions. Heavy snowfall frequently obstructed roads and slowed army movement, necessitating periodic clearing operations. On April 6, 2020, Sapper Sangi Reddy was working with a dozer to clear snow from a road. During the operation, he was struck by a terrifying avalanche. Because of the avalanche's size and speed, he didn't have time to take any protective measures. As a result, Sapper Sangi Reddy became engulfed in snow. More than 250 military personnel, as well as helicopters, tracker dogs, snow avalanche rescue dogs, and other support equipment, were deployed in a large rescue operation. On 11 April 2020, the rescue crew found his body, but he had died due to prolonged exposure to extremely cold temperatures. Sangi Reddy was a courageous and dedicated soldier who gave his life in the course of duty.

== Sena Medal ==
Sapper Reddy was awarded the “Sena Medal” (gallantry) for bravery, camaraderie, commitment to duty, and ultimate sacrifice by the honourable President of India on January 26, 2021.
