= Budda Vengal Reddy =

Indian philanthropist

Budda Vengal Reddy (30 May 1822 – 31 December 1900) was an Indian philanthropist during British rule, who saved thousands of people from death due to starvation. Queen Victoria of the British empire recognized his philanthropy and presented a gold medal to him.

== Early life ==
Budda Vengal Reddy was born on 30 May 1822 at Uyyalawada village, located in present day Kurnool District which is on the banks of Kundu River.

== Philanthropy ==
Vengal Reddy was known for his generosity. During the great famine of 1866, called "Kshaya famine" because it occurred during the year called "Kshaya" (as per the Telugu calendar), he donated all his grain, 140,000 kilograms, to prepare food and feed the poor and hungry. When he ran out of his grain stock, he borrowed from other wealthy landlords and continued the feeding. Every day, he provided gruel for more than 16,000 people.

== Recognition from Queen Victoria ==
Queen Victoria recognized his philanthropy and presented a gold medal to Vengal Reddy. This medal is still in the family of Vengal Reddy. He was also made a Member of Provincial Jury and Honorary Member of Madras Governor's Council.

== Sun and Moon of Renadu ==
Both Budda Vengal Reddy and Uyyalawada Narasimha Reddy hailed from the same village, Uyyalawada. They are popularly known as "Sun and Moon of Renadu". Narasimha Reddy is considered the sun and Vengal Reddy the moon.

== Memorial Committee for The Sun and Moon of Renadu ==
A committee (Renati Surya Chandrula Smaraka Samithi) was formed to preserve the memory of two great leaders of that time (Uyyalawada Narasimha Reddy and the Philanthropist Budda Vengal Reddy, both of whom were born in Uyyalawada village). Sri Pocha Brahmananda Reddy is the founding president of this committee.

A book (both in Telugu and English languages) titled "Renati Surya Chandrulu" (The Sun and Moon of Renadu) was published by this committee in 2015 (5th Edition of Telugu version was published on 22-Feb-2016). It contains the excerpts from research papers by eminent historians

Budda Vengala Reddy died on 31 December 1900.
