= Rentalachenu =

Village in Vedurukuppam mandal in Chittoor district, Andhra Pradesh, India

Rentalachenu is a village in Vedurukuppam mandal in Chittoor district, Andhra Pradesh, India. It comes under Thirumallaiah palli panchayat and forms a part of the Rayalaseema region. It is located 25 kilometres (16 mi) north of the district headquarter Chittoor, 20 kilometres (12 mi) south of Tirupati, 90 kilometres (56 mi) west of Chennai, and 160 kilometres (99 mi) east of Bengaluru.

== Demographics ==
Telugu is the local language. The total population of Rentalachenu is estimated to be 300, with its total area being 200 hectares.
