= V. Ramachandra Reddy =

Indian social activist (1905-1986)

Vedire Ramachandrareddy
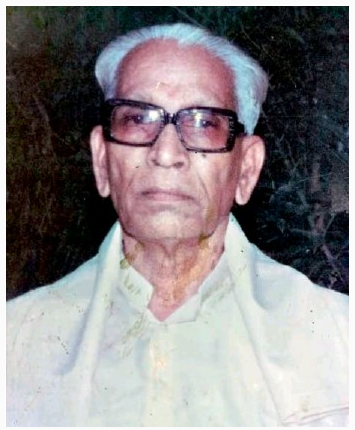
- Born: Vedire Ramachandrareddy; 13 June 1905; Pochampally, Yadadri Bhuvanagiri District, Telangana
- Died: 9 December 1986 (aged 81); Pochampally
- Occupation: Lawyer
- Known for: Land donation activist
- Children: Five sons and three daughters
- Parent: Narasa Reddy - Lakshmi Narasamma

Vedire Ramachandra Reddy (13 July 1905 – 9 December 1986) was a social activist from Telangana. He was the first landowner to donate his land to the poor as part of the Bhoodan movement in South India in 1951.

== Birth and Education ==
Ramachandra Reddy was born on 13 July 1905 to Narasa Reddy and Lakshmi Narasamma in Pochampally, Yadadri Bhuvanagiri district, Telangana state. They were a landowning family. They had nine children, three daughters (Manikyadevi, Vimaladevi, Seethadevi) and six sons (Ramachandra Reddy, Ranapratap Reddy, Lakshman Reddy, Manmohan Reddy, Madhusudhan Reddy, Narayan Karan Reddy). He completed his law/barrister training at Ferguson Law College, Pune between 1935 and 1938.

== Bhoodan Movement (Land donation movement) ==
Reddy, a social worker, received the title "Bhoodan" for his significant contribution to the land donation movement in the early 1950s in Andhra Pradesh, upon the visit of Vinobha Bhave (Heir of Gandhi, supported Gandhian ideology) specifically in the village of Pochampally in the Yadadri Bhuvanagiri District. The Bhoodan movement was initiated by Acharya Vinobha Bhave, inspired by Mahatma Gandhi, in Pochampally village in April 1951. Reddy made the first donation of 80 acres (320,000 m^{2}), which later increased to 3,000 acres (12 km^{2}). Ultimately, 1 million acres (4,000 km²) of land were donated and distributed among the poor in post-independence India.

Reddy was born on 13 July 1905, into a prominent family during the Nizam Rule in the Deccan region. He completed his legal training at Sir Alex Ferguson Law College in Pune. After practicing law for a few years, he resigned to work on social reform and played a role in initiating the land donation movement in Pochampally.

Reddy died on 9 December 1986. He donated 80 acres of land for the Gramdan Movement.
