= Baddam Yella Reddy =

Indian communist politician from Telangana (1906–1979)

Baddam Yella Reddy (Telugu: బద్దం ఎల్లారెడ్డి, 1906 in Galipalli village – 1979) was an Indian communist politician from Telangana. He was one of the prominent leaders in the Telangana armed struggle against the Nizam regime.

== Early activism ==
Yella Reddy became influenced by the socialist ideas of Jawaharlal Nehru. He belonged to the more militant sector in the Andhra Maha Sabha, that deplored the non-confrontational policies of the leadership of the organization. This tendency became increasingly attracted to communism in the late 1930s. Yella Reddy took part in the 1938 satyagrah. under the leadership of Ravi Narayana Reddy. He was amongst those jailed during the protest campaign. In 1939 the Communist Party of India established its organization in the Hyderabad State, Baddam Yella Reddy worked closely with D.V. Rao and Ravi Narayana Reddy in building grassroots networks of the party in the region.

== Andhra Maha Sabha and the Telangana rebellion ==
From 1941 Yella Reddy's communist group came to dominate the Andhra Maha Sabha. Yella Reddy became the general secretary of the Andhra Maha Sabha. Under Yella Reddy's leadership the Andhra Maha Sabha moved from being a liberal organization into a militant anti-Nizam united front.

Yella Reddy was one of the key leaders of the Telangana armed struggle. As the Nizam declared Hyderabad as an independent state in September 1947 Baddam Yella Reddy was one of the signatories of a joint declaration of the Communist Party, Andhra Maha Sabha and the All Hyderabad Trade Union Congress calling for armed struggle against the Nizam's rule and for the integration of Hyderabad to India (Yella Reddy signed on behalf of the Andhra Maha Sabha). The Telangana rebellion was one of the largest armed peasant uprisings in modern India, which lasted until 1951.

== Parliamentarian ==
Yella Reddy also served as secretary of the Telangana Provincial Committee of the Communist Party of India and was a member of the secretariat of the Vishalandhra Provincial Committee of the CPI. In the first parliamentary elections in independent India Yella Reddy was elected to the Lok Sabha in 1951 from Karimnagar as a People's Democratic Front candidate, defeating the Indian National Congress candidate P.V. Narasimha Rao (who later became the Prime Minister of India). In 1956 he became a Central Committee member of CPI. In 1958 he won a by-election to the Andhra Pradesh Legislative Assembly in the Buggaram constituency.

As CPI went through a major split in 1964, Baddam Yella Reddy joined the dissident Communist Party of India (Marxist). He was the sole prominent CPI leader in Karimnagar district to do so. However, he only stayed in the CPI(M) for three months before returning to CPI.

In 1972 he won the Indurthi seat in the Andhra Pradesh Legislative Assembly election.

== Memorials ==
In 2006, in connection with Yella Reddy's birth centenary celebrations the Andhra Pradesh Chief Minister Y.S. Rajasekhara Reddy inaugurated a bronze statue of Yella Reddy in Karimnagar. At the ceremony the Chief Minister also vowed to realize the provision of additional ayacut through the completion of irrigation projects in the Karimnagar district, a longstanding dream of Yella Reddy.
