= Rachapalem Chandrasekhara Reddy =

Indian writer (born 1948)

- Born: 16 October 1948 (age 77); Kuntrapakam, Chittoor District, Andhra Pradesh, India
- Occupations: Writer and educationist
- Awards: Sahitya Akademi Award -2014
- Website: www.yogivemanauniversity.ac.in/colleges/hu_tl_rachapalem.php

Professor Rachapalem Chandrasekhara Reddy is an Indian writer and teacher. He won the Telugu-language Kendra Sahitaya Academy Award in 2014.

== See also ==
- List of Sahitya Akademi Award winners in Telugu
