= Second and Third N. T. Rama Rao ministry =

Andhra Pradesh Council of Ministers headed by N. T. Rama Rao (1985–1989)

- 15th Ministry of Andhra Pradesh

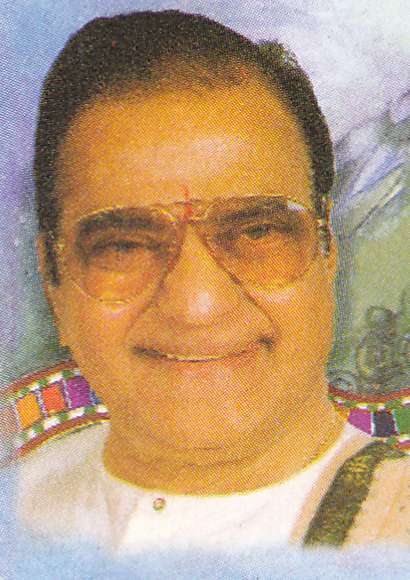
- Date formed: 16 September 1984& 9 March 1985
- Date dissolved: 8 March 1985& 2 December 1989

People and organisations
- Governor: Shankar Dayal Sharma; Kumudben Joshi
- Chief Minister: N. T. Rama Rao
- Member parties: Telugu Desam Party
- Status in legislature: Majority
- Opposition party: Indian National Congress
- Opposition leader: Mogaligundla Baga Reddy (Leader of the opposition)

History
- Election: 1985
- Legislature term: 4 years
- Predecessor: First N. T. Rama Rao ministry
- Successor: Second Marri Chenna Reddy ministry

The Second and Third N. T. Rama Rao ministry (or also known as 15th ministry of Andhra Pradesh) formed the executive branch of the Government of Andhra Pradesh after the Telugu Desam Party securing majority seats in the 1985 Andhra Pradesh Legislative Assembly election.

The state cabinet of Andhra Pradesh was sworn with a total of 15 ministers along with N. T. Rama Rao.

== In 1984 cabinet was reshuffled ==
SI No.	Name	Constituency	Department	Tenure		Party
1.	N. T. Rama Rao, Chief Minister	Tirupati	Minister of Major irrigation, Power, Major Industries, General Administration, All-India Services, Law and Order, Law, Handlooms & Textiles and all residual subjects	1984	1989	TDP
2.	Kunduru Jana Reddy	Chalakurthi	Agriculture, Co-operative, Marketing, Forest, Animal Husbandry, Fisheries, Weights & Measures, C.A.D., Transport, Roads & Buildings, Housing Panchayath Raj, Rural water scheme and Sanitation	1984	1988	TDP
3.	Thummala Nageswara Rao	Sathupalli	Minor Irrigation Minister	1985	1989	TDP
4.	Pathivada Narayanaswamy Naidu	Nellimarla		1985	1989	TDP
5.	Thota Subrarao	Jaggampeta		1985	1989	TDP
6.	Chegondi Venkata Harirama Jogaiah	Narasapuram	Home Minister	1985	1988	TDP
7.	G. Nagi Reddy	Dharmavaram	Minister of Handloom and Minor Irrigation.	1985	1988	TDP
8.	Ponnapureddy Siva Reddy	Jammalamadugu	Minister of Labour	1985	1988	TDP
9.	Kodela Siva Prasada Rao	Narasaraopet	Home Minister	1985	1988	TDP
10.	M.S.S. Koteswara Rao	Mangalagiri	Minister of Health & Medical Education	1985	1988	TDP
11.	Vasanta Nageswara Rao	Nandigama	Home Minister	1985	1988	TDP
12.	C. Ramachandraiah	Kadapa	Minister of Endowments	1985	1989	TDP
13.	K. Chandrashekar Rao	Siddipet	Minister of Drought & Relief	1985	1989	TDP
14.	Makineni Peda Rathaiah	Pratipadu	Minister of Medium Irrigation, Minor Irrigation, Drainage, Irrigation Development Corporation, Ground Water Development	1985	1989	TDP
15.	Daggubati Venkateswara Rao	Parchur	Minister of Medical and Health Services	1987	1989	TDP
16.	Nettem Raghuram	Jaggayyapeta	Excise Minister	1985	1989	TDP
17.	N. M. D. Farooq	Nandyala	Municipal urban development minority welfare.	1988	1989	TDP
18.	Chikkala Ramachandra Rao	Tallarevu	Minister of Primary Education, Employment, Training	1985	1989	TDP
19.	K. Ramachandra Rao	Medak	Minister of Panchayat Raj, Rural Development, Rural Water Supply, Employment Generation	1985	1989	TDP
20.	G. Ramarao	Boath	Minister for Tribal Welfare.	1985	1989	TDP
21.	Simhadri Satyanarayana Rao	Avanigadda	Minister of Endowments.	1985	1989	TDP
22.	Dadi Veerabhadra Rao	Anakapalle	Minister of Information & Public Relations.	1985	1989	TDP
23.	Yanamala Ramakrishnudu	Tuni	Minister of Co-Operation	1985	1988	TDP
24.	K. Pratibha Bharati	Srikakulam	Minister of Social Welfare, Women Welfare & Family welfare	1985	1989	TDP
25.	P. Indra Reddy	Chevella	Minister for Education, Labour and Employment	1985	1989	TDP
26.	Kimidi Kalavenkata Rao	Unukuru	Home Minister	1988	1989	TDP
27.	K. E. Krishnamurthy	Dhone	Irrigation Minister	1985	1989	TDP
28.	Ashok Gajapathi Raju	Vizianagaram	Minister of Commercial Taxes	1985	1989	TDP
29.	P. Mahendranath	Achampet		1985	1989	TDP
30.	Mudragada Padmanabham	Pratipadu	Excise Minister	1985	1988	TDP
31.	Gali Muddu Krishnama Naidu	Putturu	Minister of Higher Education, including College Education, & Intermediate Education	1988	1989	TDP
32.	Motkupalli Narasimhulu	Thungathurthi		1985	1989	TDP
33.	Srinivasulu Reddy Nallapareddy	Kovur	Revenue Minister	1988	1989	TDP
34.	Pusapati Anand Gajapathi Raju	Bheemili		1985	1989	TDP
35.	Mootha Gopalakrishna	Kakinada		1988	1989	TDP
36.	Dhulipalla Veeriah Chaudhary	Ponnur	Revenue Minister	1988	1989	TDP
37.	Makineni Peda Rathaiah	Prathipadu		1985	1989	TDP
38.	Damacharla Anjaneyulu	Kondapi		1988	1989	TDP
39.	Mukku Kasi Reddy	Kanigiri	Sericulture Minister	1988	1989	TDP
40.	Anam Ramanarayana Reddy	Atmakur	Minister for Roads and Building.	1985	1989	TDP
41.	Alimineti Madhava Reddy	Bhongir	Minister of Home affairs, Jails, Fire services,	1985	1989	TDP
42.	B Vishwa Mohan Reddy	Yemmiganur	Minister of Municipal Administration	1987	1989	TDP
43.	Pendyala Venkata Krishna Rao	Kovvuru		1988	1989	TDP
44.	R.Rajagopala Reddy	Lakkireddypalle		1985	1989	TDP
45.	S. Ramachandra Reddy	Penukonda	Minister for Industry and Ports.	1985	1989	TDP
46.	Muddasani Damodar Reddy	Kamalapur		1985	1989	TDP
47.	Chintakayala Ayyanna Patrudu	Narsipatnam	Minister of Technical Education	1985	1989	TDP
48.	Reddy Satyanarayana	Madugula		1985	1989	TDP
49.	J. R. Pushpa Raju	Tadikonda		1988	1989	TDP
50.	Koneru Nageswara Rao	Kothagudem		1985	1989	TDP
51.	N. Yethiraja Rao	Chennur	Minister of Endorsements, Housing A. P. Housing Board, Weaker Sections, Housing Including A. P. Housing Corporation.	1985	1989	TDP
52.	Nimma Raja Reddy	Cheriyal	Finance Minister and Power and Handlooms Minister.	1985	1989	TDP
53.	D. Satyanarayana	Nizamabad	Minister of Mines and Geology	1985	1989	TDP
54.	Aleti Mahipal Reddy	Armur	Minister of Forests	1985	1989	TDP
55.	Malyala Rajaiah	Andole	Minister of Finance and Power	1985	1989	TDP
56.	Karnam Ramachandra Rao	Medak		1985	1989	TDP
57.	Kommareddy Surender Reddy	Medchal	Minister of Forest & Environment and Animal Husbandry.	1985	1989	TDP
58.	Sripathi Rajeshwar Rao	Sanathnagar		1985	1989	TDP
59.	A. Chandra Sheker	Vikarabad		1985	1989	TDP
60.	Byreddy Sheshasaireddy	Nandikotkur		1988	1989	TDP
61.	Gurram Narayanappa	Uravakonda		1985	1989	TDP
62.	H. B. Narase Gowd	Madakasira		1985	1989	TDP
63.	Patnam Subbaiah	Palamaner		1985	1989	TDP

== First N. T. Rama Rao ministry (1983 to 1984) ==
SI No.	Name	Constituency	Department	Party
1.	N. T. Rama Rao, Chief Minister	Tirupati	General Administration, Services, Law and Order, ScheduIed Castes and Scheduled Tribes Cell, 20 points programme, State Committee on National Integratioa, Elections, Accommodation, Minorities Commission. Home, Police, Prisons, Passports, Arms Act, Information & Public Relations, Cinematograph act & Rules, Development of Film Industry, Film Development Corporation, Major Industries including establishment of Industries Departments, Paper, Cement, Sugar cane Development Sugar including Khandasari and Jagger mines and Geology including development of Limestone, Granite etc., Coal, Small scale Industry, Handloom and Textiles, Sericulture, Science, Technology, Environmental Control, Printing and Stationery, Commerce and Export Promotion, Nizam Sugar Factory, A. P, Industrial Development Corporation A. P. Industrial Infrastructure Corporation, A, P. mining Corporation Leather Industries Development Corporation of Andhra Pradesh Singareni Collieries Company Limited Khadi and Village Industries, State Trading Corporation, Oil and Gas based industries including Fertilisers planning. Bureau of economics and Statistics, Godavari Valley Development Authority.	TDP
2.	Nadendla Bhaskara Rao	Vemuru	Finance, Small savings, State Lotteries, Minister, Finance. Commercial Taxes, Energy.	TDP
3.	Srinivasulu Reddy Nallapareddy	Kovur	Works, Roads & Buildings, Irrigation, Highways, Roads & Buildings, PWD Workshops under control of Chief Engineers, Roads & Buildings concurrent subjects relating to Railway and Posts and Telegraphs, civil Aviation and ports, Irrigation, Flood control and Drainage, ground Water investigation and Development, A.P. State Construction Corporation Andhra Pradesh, Irrigation Development Corporation, Engineering Research Laboratories.	TDP
4.	Sirigireddi Ramamuni Reddy	Kadapa	Health & Medical, Health and Medical Education, Prevention of Adulteration of Food and Drugs, Indian medicine, Population control and Family Welfare	TDP
5.	Mohammed Shakir	Kadiri	Tourism and Wakfs, Tourism Development Corporation, Flying and Gliding Clubs, Wakfs and Urdu Academy.	TDP
6.	Kunduru Jana Reddy	Chalakurthi	Agriculture including Food production Horticulture, Farmers welfare, Co-operation Forests including Zoological and Botanical parks, Coffee plantations, Animal Husbandry including Development of poultry and Sheep and Pig Rearing Fisheries, common area Development A.P.state Agro Industries Corporation Dairy Development Federation, Meat poultry Development corporation, Milk Supply Schemes, Forest Development Corporation, Fisheries Development Corporation, marketing, weights & Measures warehousing Corporation.	TDP
7.	T. Jeevan Reddy	Jagtial	Excise, Excise including Government Distilleries and Molasses Control.	TDP
8.	K. Pratibha Bharati	Srikakulam	Minister of Social Welfare, Women Welfare & Family welfare	TDP
9.	Yanamala Rama Krishnudu	Tuni	Law and Courts, Legislature Affair including Legislators Hostels and Legislator's Housing, Municipal Administration including Municipal, Corporations, Urban Development Authorities Town Planning Trust, Slum Clearance, Urban Water Supply and Drainage including Hyderabad, City Water Works, Housing other than Weaker Sections, Housing A.P. Housing Board	TDP
10.	Madhavaram Ramachandra Rao	Khairatabad	Labour including Industrial Relations Welfare of Labour including Employees, State Insurance and Welfare of Agriculture Labour, Employment Services, Special Employment Scheme A.P.Rajya Sainik Board.	TDP
11.	Pusapati Ananda Gajapati Raju	Bheemunipatnam	Education, Primary, Secondary & collegiate including A. P. Open University Technical Education including Industrial Training and Apprenticeship, Literary and Scientific Associations, cultural affairs, visiting cultural delegations, Academies and Auditorium Ravindra Bharathi, Residential Schools Development of Modern Official Languages, History of Freedom movement, public Libraries, sports, sports council youth services Archives, Archaeology and Museums, state council for Educational Research and Training.	TDP
12.	Karanam Ramachandra Rao	Medak	Panchayat Raj, Rural Development, National Employment programme, Rural water supply including protected water supply schemes for Villages, rural Development and integrated Development programmes.	TDP
13.	Eli Anjaneyulu	Tadepalligudem	Endowments, Land Revenue, Land Reforms, Urban Land Ceilings, Registration & Stamps, Atiyat and jagir Administration, Debt Settlement Board, Survey & Settlement, Estate Abolition, Welfare of Freedom Fighters, Administration of Chief Ministers Relief Fund, Rural Indebtedness and Rural Agricultural Indebtedness, Relief of Distress due to natural calamities, Societies Registration Act, Indian partnership Act, Food and Civil Supplies, Public Distribution System including distribution of subsidised Foodgralns.	TDP
14.	Sangamreddy Satyanarayana	Hanamkonda	Transport Minister	TDP
15.	Puttapaga Mahendranath	Achampeta	Revenue, Land Reforms and Civil Supplies.	TDP
