= Second Marri Chenna Reddy ministry =

Andhra Pradesh Council of Ministers headed by Marri Chenna Reddy (1989–1990)

- 16th Ministry of Andhra Pradesh

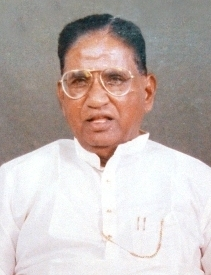
- Date formed: 3 December 1989
- Date dissolved: 17 December 1990

People and organisations
- Governor: Kumudben Joshi; Krishan Kant
- Chief Minister: Marri Chenna Reddy
- Member parties: Indian National Congress (Indira)
- Status in legislature: Majority
- Opposition party: Telugu Desam Party
- Opposition leader: N. T. Rama Rao (Leader of the opposition)

History
- Election: 1989
- Outgoing election: 1985
- Legislature term: 5 years
- Predecessor: Second and Third N. T. Rama Rao ministry
- Successor: First N. Janardhana Reddy ministry

The Second Marri Chenna Reddy ministry (or also known as 16th ministry of Andhra Pradesh) formed the executive branch of the Government of Andhra Pradesh after the Indian National Congress securing majority seats in the 1989 Andhra Pradesh Legislative Assembly election.

The state cabinet of Andhra Pradesh was sworn with a total of 19 ministers along with Marri Chenna Reddy.

== Council of ministers ==
This is a former Cabinet of Andhra Pradesh headed by the then Chief Minister of Andhra Pradesh, Marri Chenna Reddy

Portfolio	Minister	Constituency	Party
Chief Minister
General Administration; Law & Order; Major Industries; Major Irrigation; Home; Subjects not allotted to any other Minister	Marri Chenna Reddy	Sanathnagar	INC(I)
Cabinet Ministers
Panchayati Raj & Rural Development; Minor Irrigation including Ground Water	V Chenga Reddy	Nagari	INC(I)
Co-operation; Sericulture; I & P R	J. C. Diwakar Reddy	Tadpatri	INC(I)
Youth Affairs and Sports; Printing & Stationery; Cinematograph Act & Film Development Corporation; Flying & Gliding Clubs	V. Hanumantha Rao	Himayatnagar	INC(I)
Agriculture, Command Area Development; Forests	Nedurumalli Janardhana Reddy	Venkatagiri	INC(I)
Civil Supplies; Excise	Mudragada Padmanabham	Prathipadu	INC(I)
Housing; A.P. Housing Board; Municipal Administration & Urban Development	Koneru Ranga Rao	Tiruvuru	INC(I)
Endowments; Commercial Taxes	Maganti Ravindranath Chowdary	Denduluru	INC(I)
Finance; Power; Handlooms & Textiles; Legislative Affairs	Konijeti Rosaiah	Chirala	INC(I)
Revenue; Law & Courts	D. K. Samarasimha Reddy	Gadwal	INC(I)
Roads & Buildings; Ports; Mines & Geology including A.P. State Mining corporation; Health & Medical	Nallapareddy Srinivasulu Reddy	Kovur	INC(I)
Transport; Sugar Industry	G. V. Sudhakar Rao	Luxettipet	INC(I)
Animal Husbandry; Commerce & Export Promotion including State Trading Corporation	Sangitha Venkata Reddy	Alamuru	INC(I)
Labour; Employment; Employees State Insurance; Factories; Tourism and Tourism Development Corporation	Jakkula Chittaranjan Das	Kalwakurthi	INC(I)
Social Welfare; Cultural Affairs	Jetti Geetha Reddy	Gajwel	INC(I)
Waqfs; Urdu Academy; Minorities; Small Sca!e Industries including Khadi & Village Industries Board	Mohammad Jani	Guntur-I	INC(I)
Technical Education; Higher Education; Public Libraries; Archives & Archaeology	Katari Eswar Kumar	Gudivada	INC(I)
Women & Child Welfare; Leather Industries Development Corporation of Andhra Pradesh; Secondary Education	Pamidi Samanthakamani	Singanamala	INC(I)
Marketing; Ware Housing; Medium Irrigation; Flood Control and Drainage	Mukkapati Venkateswara Rao	Nandigama	INC(I)

== See also ==
- Andhra Pradesh Council of Ministers
- Second N. T. Rama Rao ministry
