= Achampet =

Achampet or Achampeta or Atchampeta may refer to:

- Achampet, Nagarkurnool district, a village in Telangana, India
  - Achampet (SC) (Assembly constituency), a SC (Scheduled Caste) reserved constituency of the Telangana Legislative Assembly
- Atchampet, Andhra Pradesh, a village in Guntur district, Andhra Pradesh, India
- Atchampeta, Prakasam district, a village in Racherla mandal, Prakasam district, Andhra Pradesh, India
- Atchampet mandal, Guntur district a mandal in Guntur district, Andhra Pradesh, India
- Achampet, Nizamabad district, a village in Nizamsagar mandal of Nizamabad district, India
