= N. T. Rama Rao ministry =

N. T. Rama Rao ministry may refer to these cabinets headed by Indian politician N. T. Rama Rao as chief minister of Andhra Pradesh:

- First N. T. Rama Rao ministry
- Second N. T. Rama Rao ministry
- Third N. T. Rama Rao ministry
- Fourth N. T. Rama Rao ministry
