= Polamreddy Srinivasulu Reddy =

Indian politician

Polamreddy Srinivasulu Reddy (born 1958) is an Indian politician from Andhra Pradesh. He was a former two-time member of the Andhra Pradesh Legislative Assembly who won from Kovur Assembly constituency in Nellore district, in 2004 and 2014 representing the Indian National Congress and the Telugu Desam Party respectively.

== Early life ==
Reddy is from Kovur, Nellore district, Andhra Pradesh. He is the son of P. Venku Reddy. He did his technical training in welding at Industrial Training Institute, Nellore in 1977. He declared assets worth Rs.25 crore in 2014 and Rs.13 crore in 2009, in his affidavits to the Election Commission of India.

== Career ==
Reddy won from Kovur Assembly constituency in the 2014 Andhra Pradesh Legislative Assembly election representing the Telugu Desam Party. He polled 94,108 votes and defeated his nearest rival and three time MLA, Nallapareddy Prasanna Kumar Reddy of the YSR Congress Party, by a margin of 7,937 votes. Contesting on TDP ticket again, he lost the 2019 election to N. Prasanna Kumar Reddy of YSR Congress by a margin of 39,891 votes.
