= Mahanandi =

Village in Andhra Pradesh, India

Mahanandi Temple
- Mahanandi
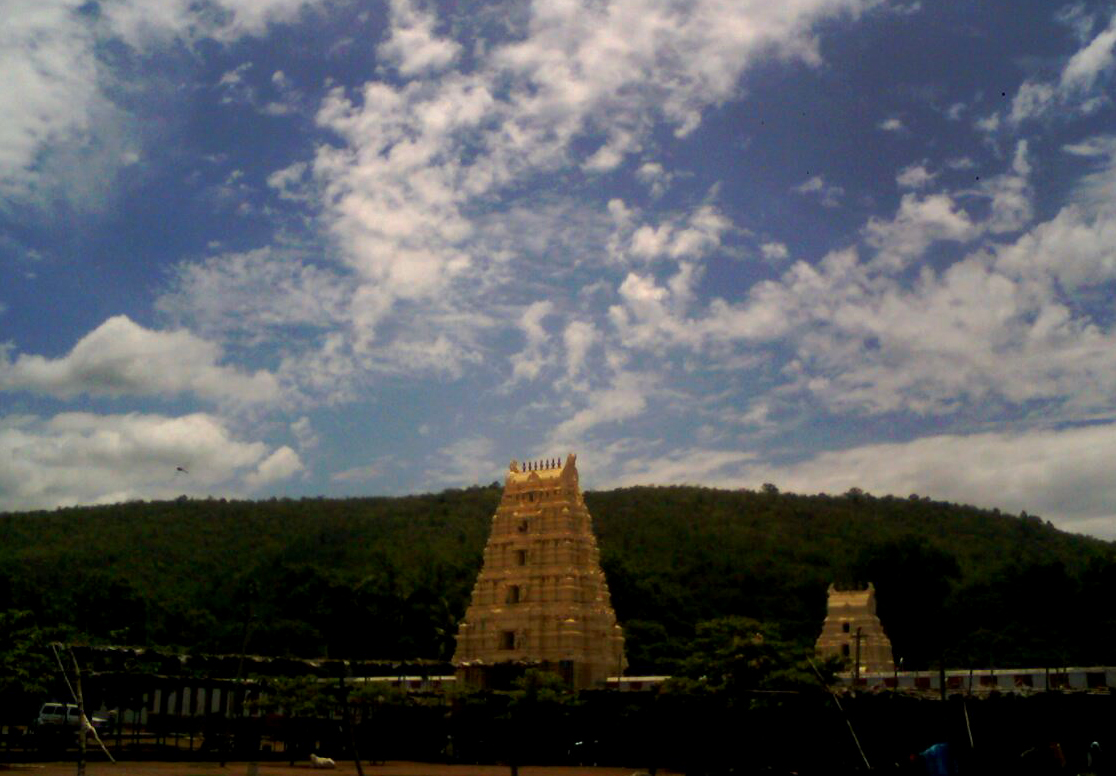

- Location in Andhra Pradesh

Religion
- Affiliation: Hinduism
- District: Nandyal district
- Deity: Shiva
- Festivals: Maha Shivaratiri, Kartik Purnima

Location
- Location: Nandyal
- State: Andhra Pradesh
- Country: India
- Interactive map of Mahanandi Temple
- Coordinates: 15°28′14″N 78°37′34″E

Architecture
- Type: Dravidian architecture

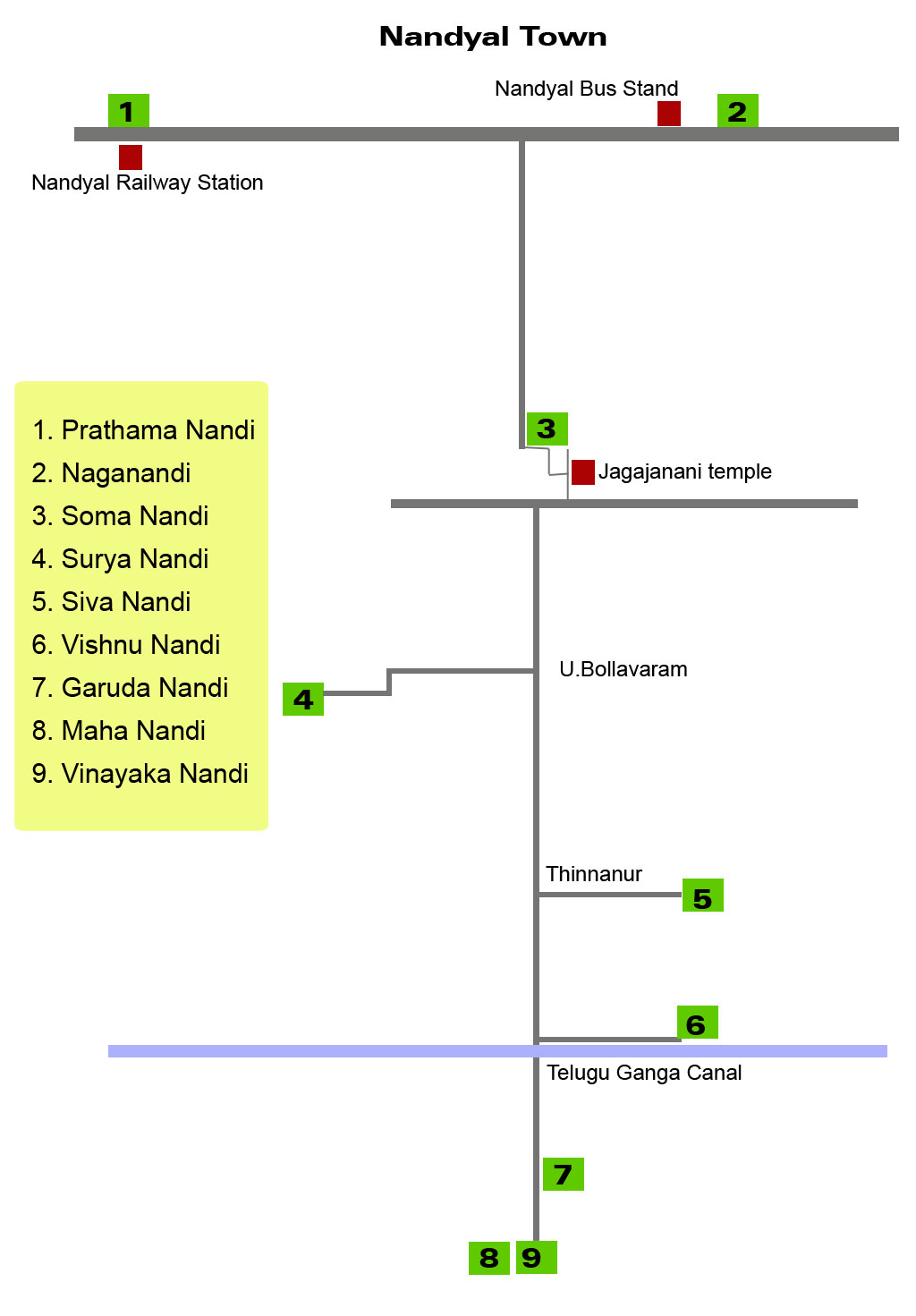
Navanandi Schematic route map from Nandyal

Mahanandi is a village located east of the Nallamala Hills of Nandyal District, Andhra Pradesh, India. It is surrounded by forests. Within 15 km of Mahanandi, there are nine Nandi shrines known as Nava nandulu. Mahanandi is one of the Nava Nandis. The Mahanandiswara Swamy Temple, an important shrine, is located here. This ancient temple dates back over 1,500 years. The inscriptions of 10th century tablets speak of the temple being repaired and rebuilt several times.

These nine temples are Mahanandi, Sivanandi, Vinayakanandi, Somanandi, Prathamanandi, Garudanandi, Suryanandi, Krishnanandi (also called Vishnunandi) and Naganandi.

A festival is held here annually during February and March to celebrate Maha Shivaratri, the Great Night of Shiva.

Mahanandi is about 21 km from Nandyal. The nearest international airport is at Hyderabad, which is about 215 km and the nearest railway station is at Nandyal. There are two routes to reach Mahanandi from Nandyal town. One route via Thimmapuram is the shortest, around 17 km from bus stand. The other route via giddalur road is the longer option, around 24 km from Nandyal.

== Temple Architecture ==
The temple is known for its fresh water pools, called Kalyani or Pushkarni. The architecture of the temple shows the strong presence of the Chalukya Kings in this region. The pools of temple shows the skill of the Vishwakarmas.

The original structure was built by Badami Chalukyas in 7th century, while several additions were made in the 10th and 15th centuries. The gopuram over main sanctum was built in Badami Chalukyan style of architecture and other structures in the temple are in Vijayanagara style. According to the legend, the local kings known as Nandas ruled here in 10th century CE and built a series of temples and worshiped their ancestral deity the Nandi, hence the name Mahanandi.

The main temple is surrounded by three pools: two small pools at the entrance and one large pool inside the temple itself. This holy tank is 60 square feet (5.6 m^{2}) with an outdoor pavilion called a mandapa in the centre. The inlets and outlets of the tank are arranged so that the depth of the water is constantly kept at five feet, thus enabling pilgrims to bathe in the holy waters. Bathing in the inside big pool is prohibited after 5PM every day.

A peculiarity of the water source is that it has a constant flow irrespective of the change of seasons. The water source originates at the Garbhagruha (inner shrine) just below Swayambhu Linga. One can touch the water near the Shiva Linga (symbol of Shiva). The devotees can offer prayers and touch the Shiva Linga. This is unusual because traditionally at temples, the main deity is kept away from the touch of the devotees.

The water is famous for its crystalline and healing qualities and is also tepid. The outgoing water irrigates 2,000 acres (8.1 km^{2}) of fertile land surrounding the village. The surrounding areas are under production with rice fields, fruit, vegetable and flower gardens. The temple is well known for the Koneru. The water during the winter season will be very hot and vice versa during the summer. During the early mornings, the water is tepid and it gets cooled gradually with the rise in temperature.

== Photos ==
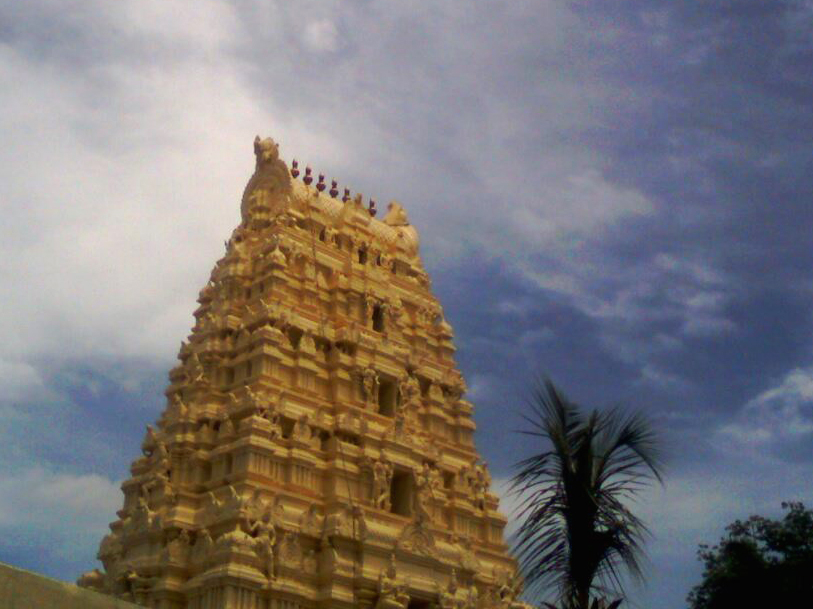
Mahanandi Temple Gopuram

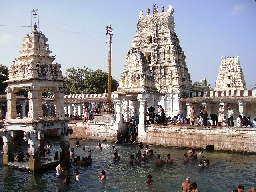
Mahanandi pushkarini view

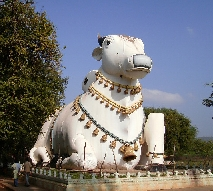
Worlds biggest Nandi statue at Mahanandi

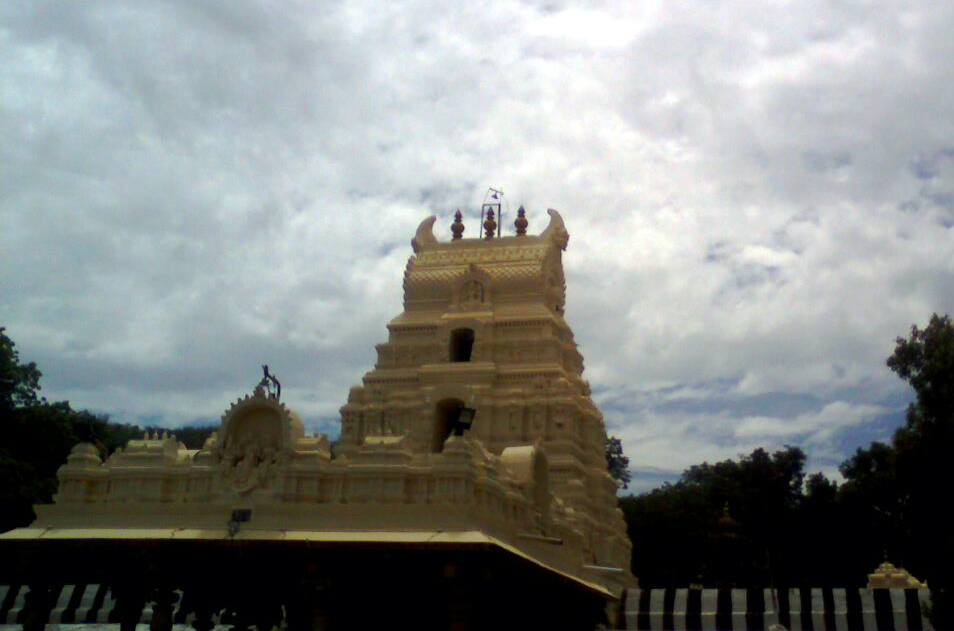
Mahanandi Temple Gopuram

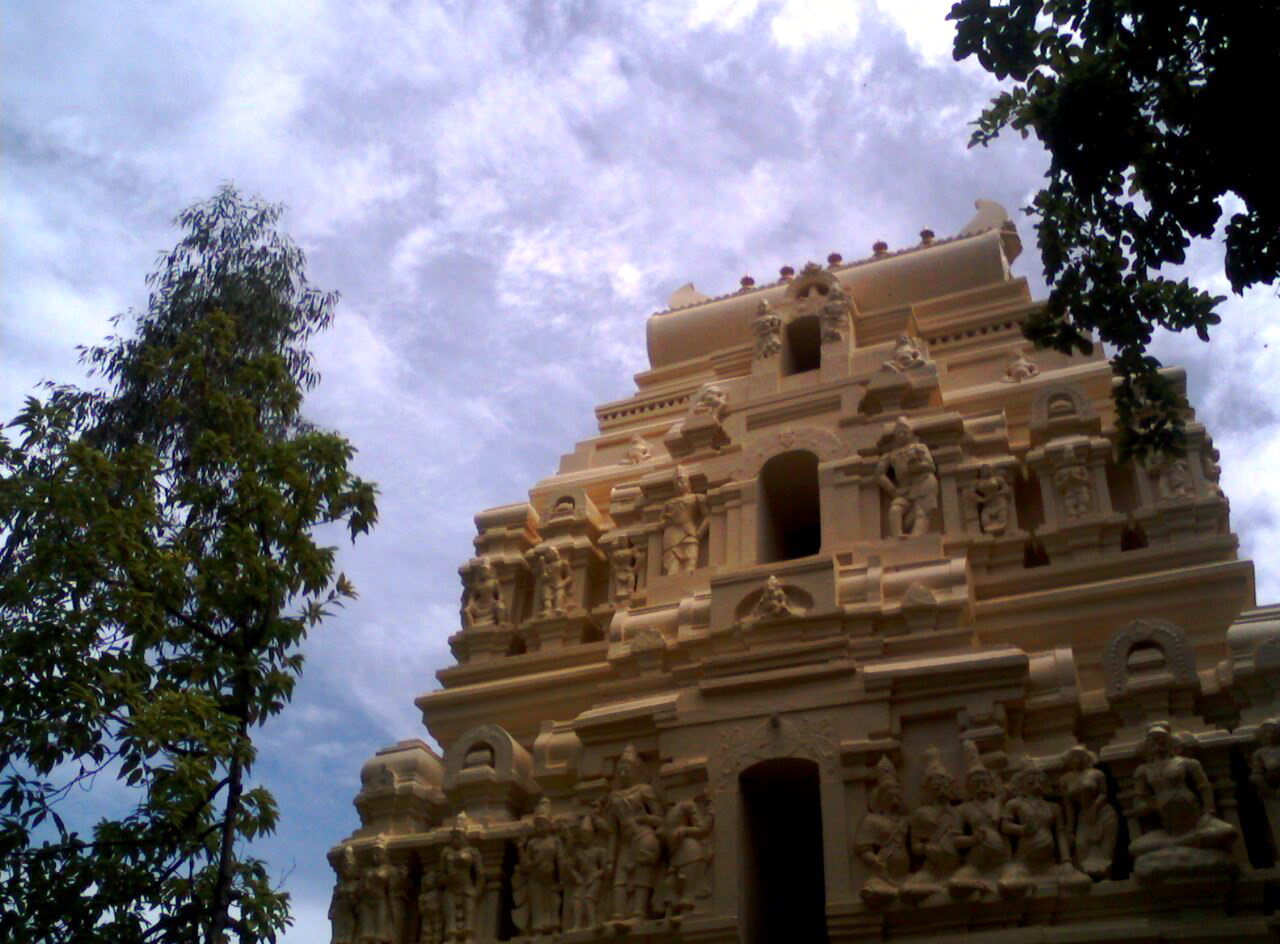
Mahanandi Temple Gopuram view

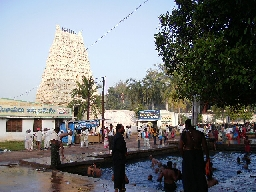
Pushkarini at Mahanandi
