= Vemireddy Prashanthi Reddy =

Indian politician

Member of Legislative Assembly Andhra Pradesh
- Incumbent
- Assumed office 2024
- Preceded by: Nallapareddy Prasanna Kumar Reddy
- Constituency: Kovur

Personal details
- Party: Telugu Desam Party

Vemireddy Prashanthi Reddy (born 1965) is an Indian politician from Andhra Pradesh. She is a member of the Andhra Pradesh Legislative Assembly from Kovur Assembly Constituency in Nellore District. She represents the Telugu Desam Party. She won the 2024 Andhra Pradesh Legislative Assembly election.

== Early life and education ==
Prashanthi is from Nellore, Nellore district, Andhra Pradesh. She married industrialist Vemireddy Prabhakar Reddy, who won the Nellore Lok Sabha seat in the 2024 election. She studied Intermediate at SPW Junior College, Tirupati, and passed the examinations in 1982. Later, she discontinued her studies.

== Political career ==
Prashanthi won 2024 Andhra Pradesh Legislative Assembly election from Kovur Assembly Constituency representing Telugu Desam Party. She polled 1,30,623 votes and defeated her nearest rival, Nallapareddy Prasanna Kumar Reddy of the YSR Congress Party by a margin of 54,583 votes.

In September 2021, she was nominated to the Tirupati Tirumala Devasthanam Trust board as a Trust member.

=== Controversy ===
A controversy broke out on 7 July 2025, when former Kovur MLA Nallapureddy Prasanna Kumar Reddy of YSR Congress Party, allegedly made derogatory remarks against Prashanthi Reddy. Later on 7 July night, unidentified miscreants allegedly ransacked Prasanna Kumar Reddy's house in Nellore, and threatened his mother when she was alone at home. Prasanna Kumar Reddy filed a complaint with the Superintendent of Police and named members of Vemireddy family and their followers as suspects.

Prashanthi denied the allegations and said, the remarks against her amounted to 'character assassination' and threatened to file a defamation case against Prasanna Kumar Reddy and also filed a complaint with the National Commission for Women. She also submitted a complaint to the Additional Superintendent of Police Ch. Soujanya in Nellore and an FIR was registered on 10 July against Prasanna Kumar Reddy including under section 74 of the Bharatiya Nyaya Sanhita (BNS) for 'assault or use of criminal force against a woman with the intent to outrage her modesty'.
