= Temple tank =

Wells or reservoirs built as part of the temple complex near Indian temples

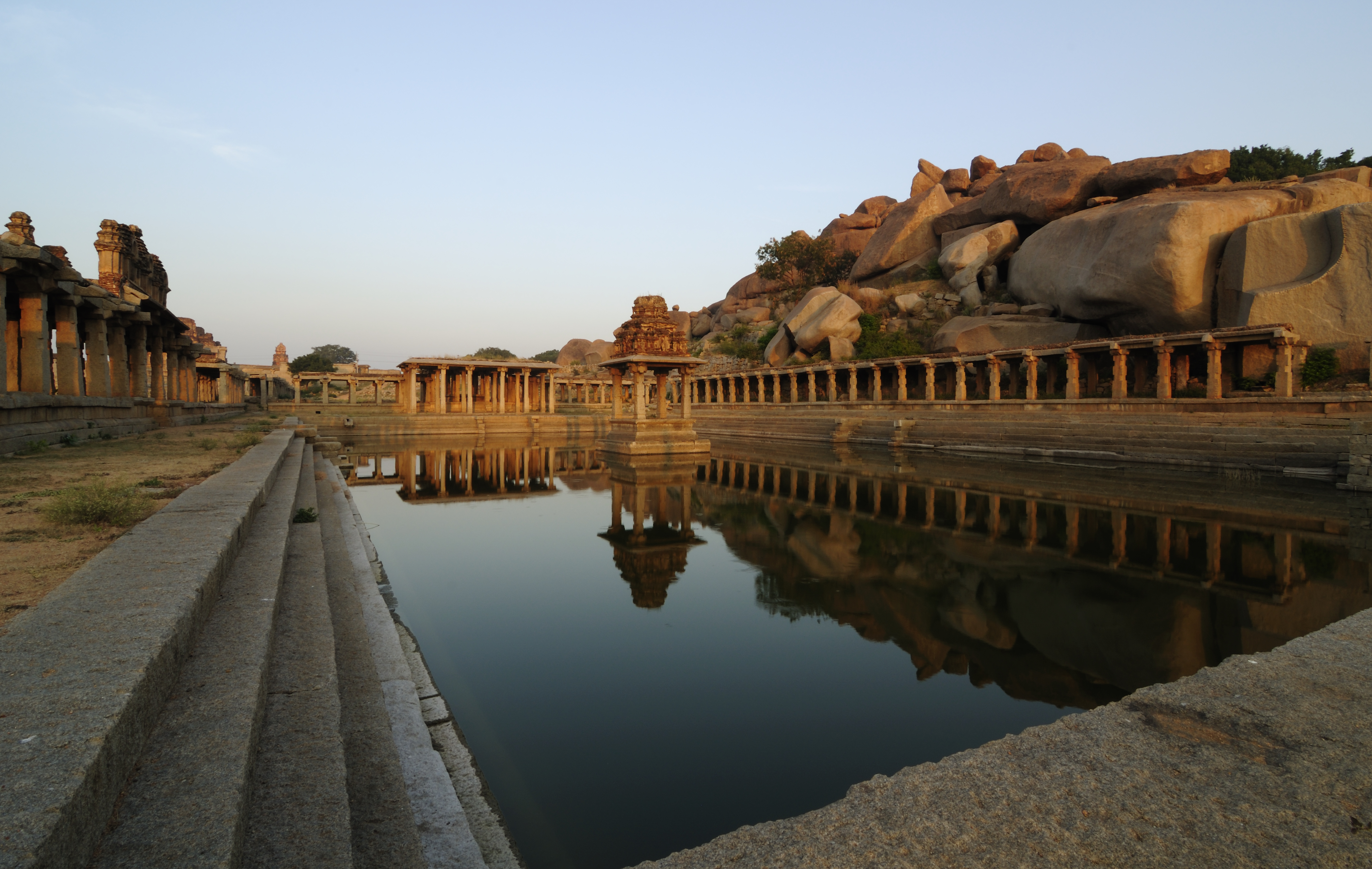
Temple tank in Hampi, Karnataka.

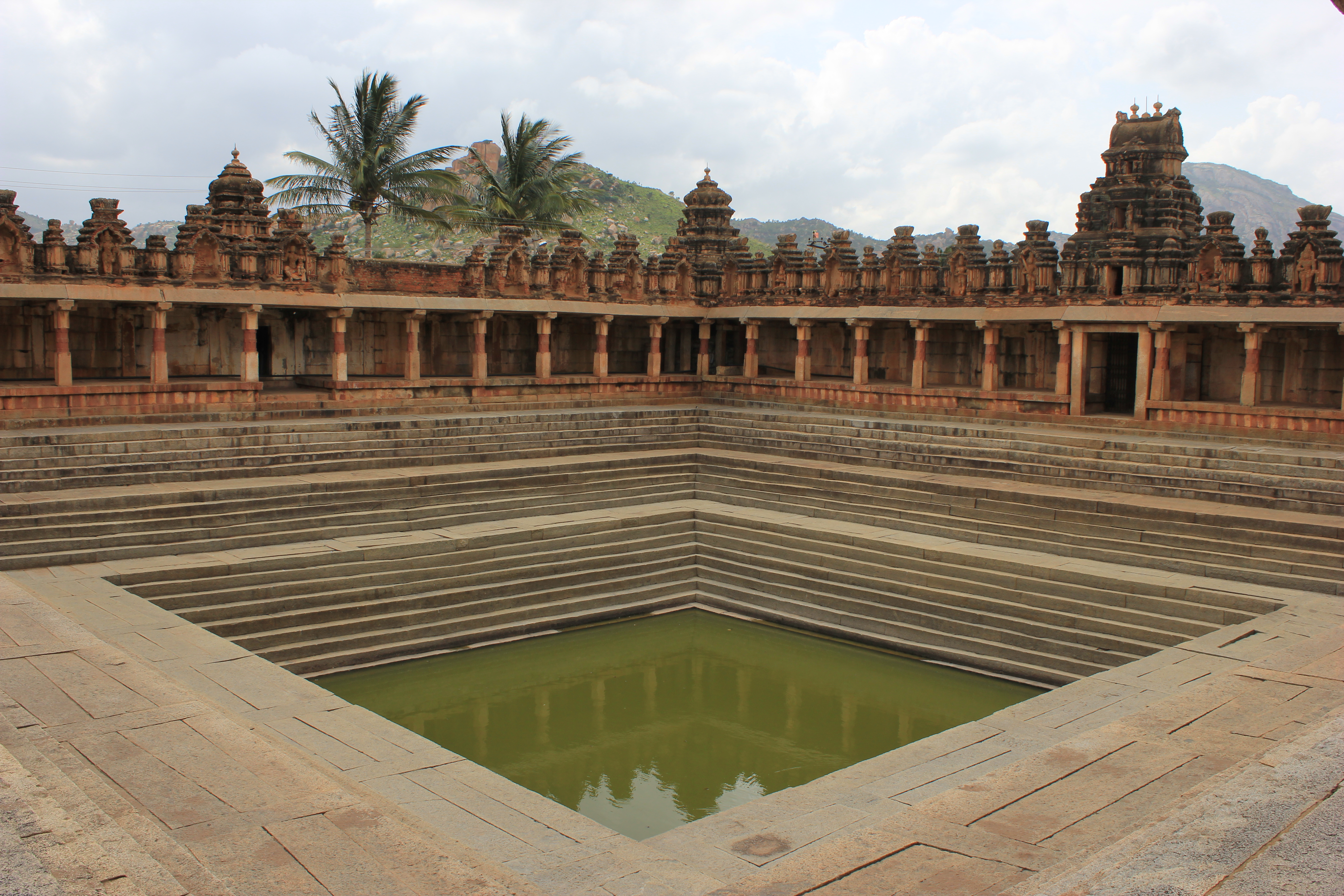
Temple tank in Bhoga Nandeeshwara Temple at Chikkaballapur district, Karnataka.

Temple tanks are wells or reservoirs built as part of the temple complex near Indian temples. They are called pushkarini, kalyani, kunda, sarovara, tirtha, talab, pukhuri, ambalakkuḷam, etc. in different languages and regions of India. Some tanks are said to cure various diseases and maladies when bathed in. It is possible that these are cultural remnants of structures such as the Great Bath of Mohenjo-daro or Dholavira, which was part of the Indus Valley civilization. Some are stepwells with many steps at the sides.

== Tank design ==
Since ancient times, the design of water storage has been important in India's temple architecture, especially in western India where dry and monsoon seasons alternate. Temple tank design became an art form in itself. An example of the art of tank design is the large, geometrically spectacular Stepped Tank at the Royal Center at the ruins of Vijayanagara, the capital of the Vijayanagara Empire, surrounding the modern town of Hampi. It is lined with green diorite and has no drain. It was filled by aqueduct.

The tanks are used for ritual cleansing and during rites of consecration. The water in the tank is deemed to be sacred water from the Ganges River.

== Stepwell ==
In India, a stepwell is a deep masonry well with steps going down to the water level in the well. It is called a vav in west India and a baoli in north India. Some were built by kings and were richly ornamented. They often were built by nobility, some being for secular use from which anyone could obtain water.

== Kalyani ==
Kalyani, also called pushkarani, are ancient Hindu stepped bathing wells.

These wells were typically built near Hindu temples to accommodate bathing and cleansing activities before prayer. They are also used for immersion of Ganesha idols during Ganesha Chaturthi.

== Sikhism ==
In Sikhism, temple tanks are called sarovar (Punjabi: ਸਰੋਵਰ sarōvara). They are also known as talab. The largest of all Sarovars is at Gurdwara Sri Tarn Taran Sahib.

The five main sarovars of Amritsar are: Amritsar, Bibeksar, Ramsar, Kaulsar, and Santokhsar.

== Gallery ==
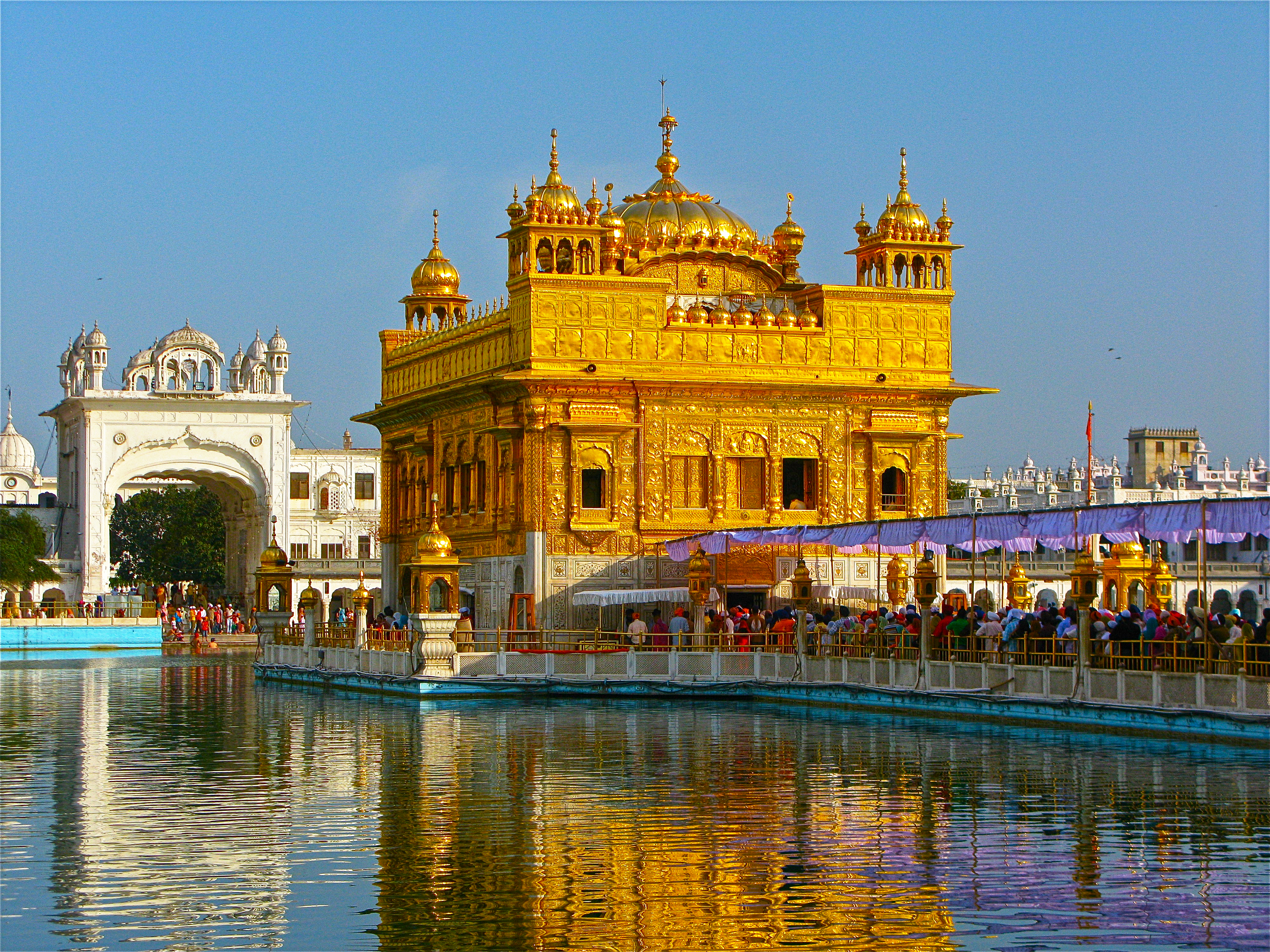
Sarovar at the Sikh Harmandir Sahib, the "Golden Temple" at Amritsar, Punjab

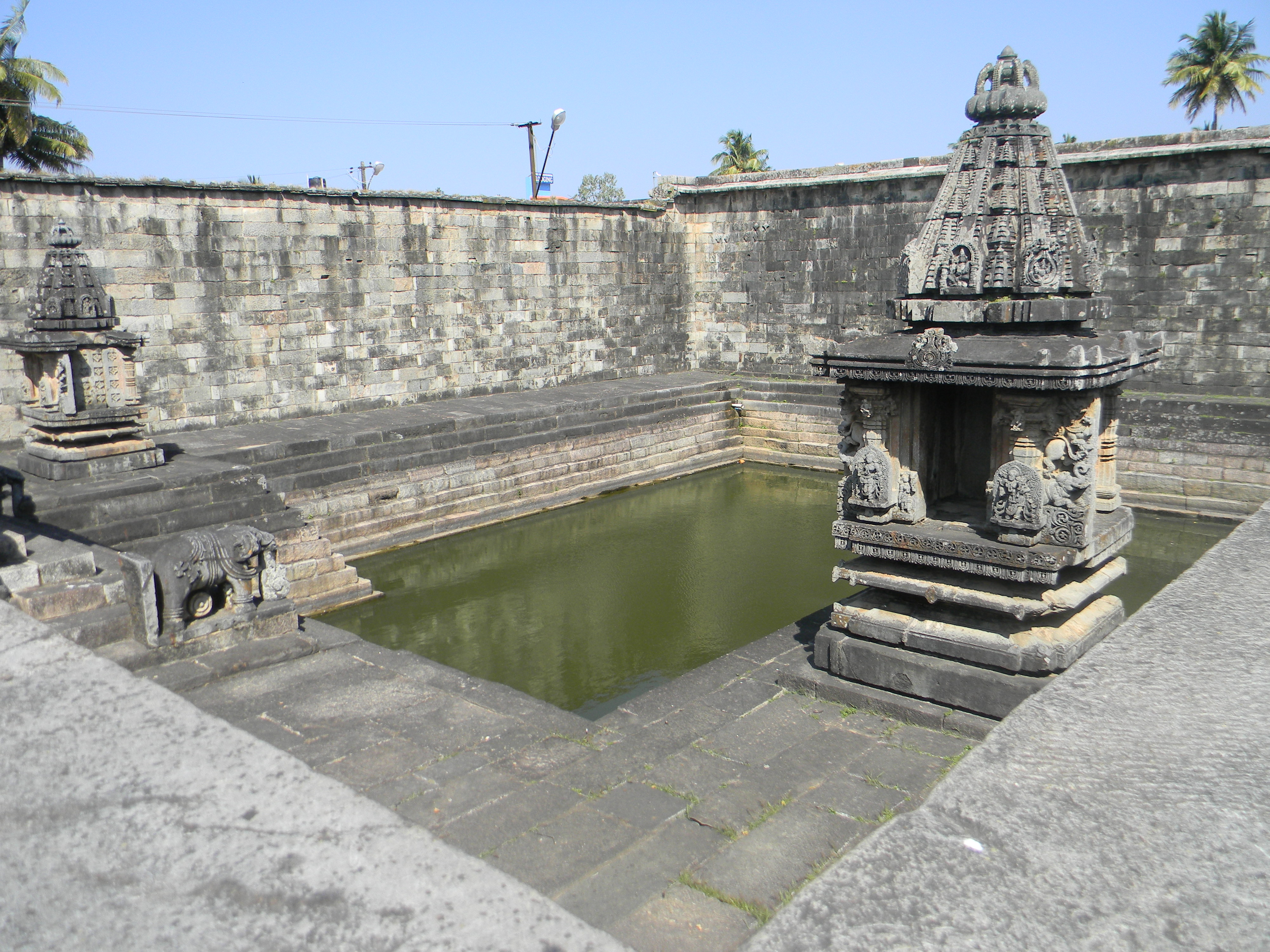
A temple tank at Chennakesava Temple in Belur, Karnataka.

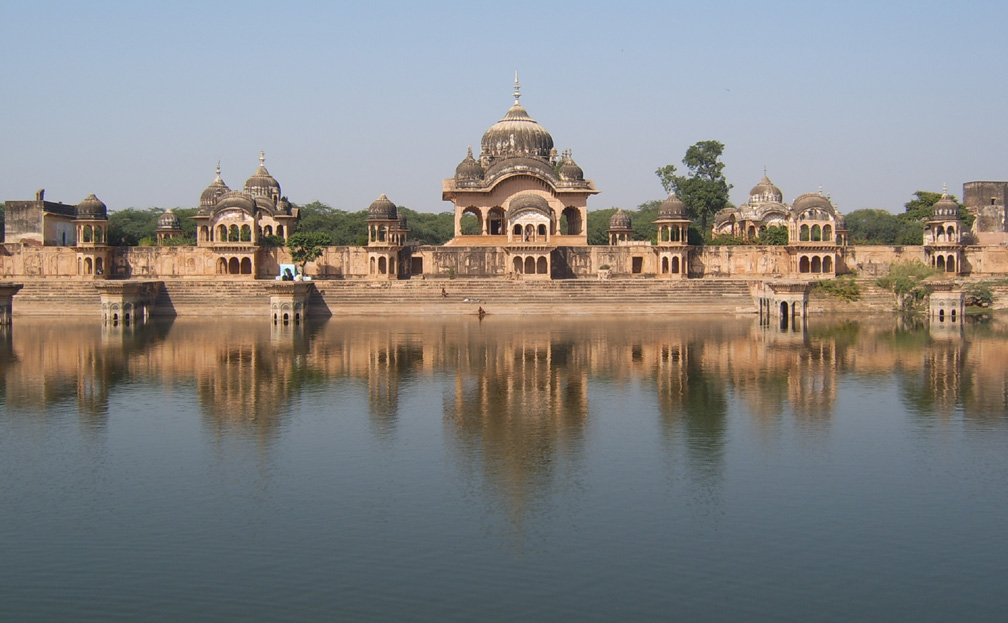
Kusuma Sarovar Ghat in Mathura district, Uttar Pradesh

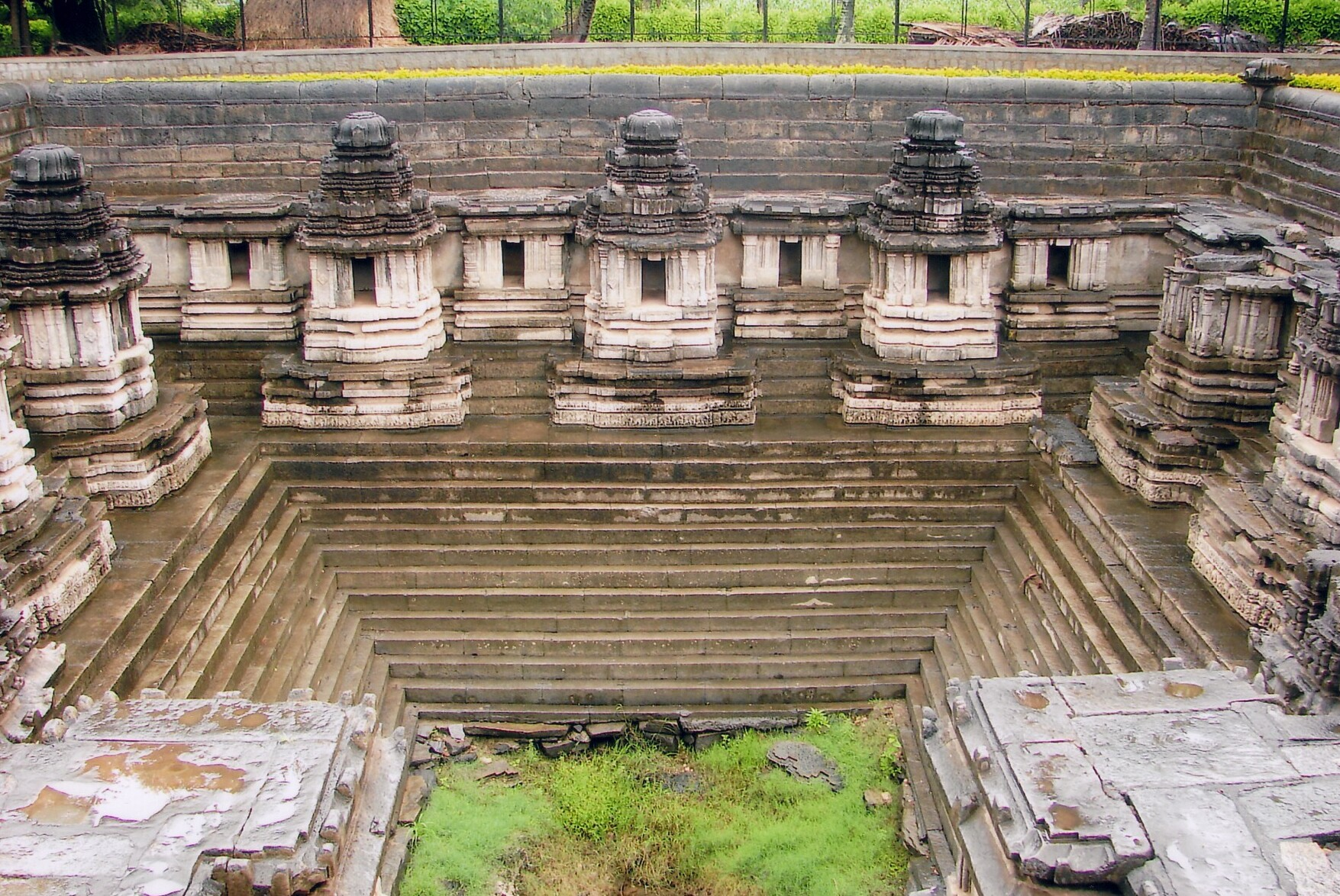
Hoysala stepped temple tank at Hulikere, Karnataka

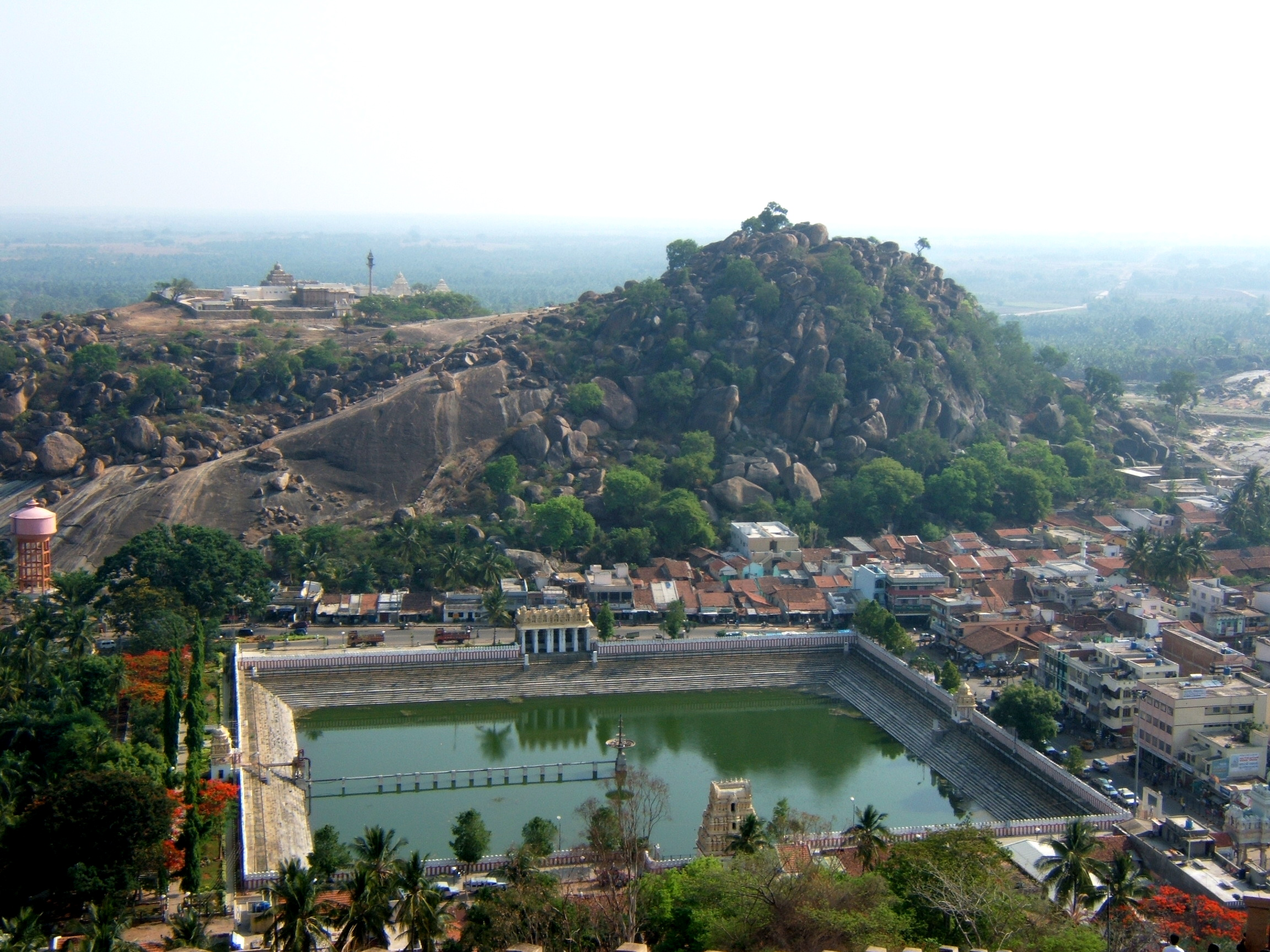
Tank at Shravanabelagola, Karnataka

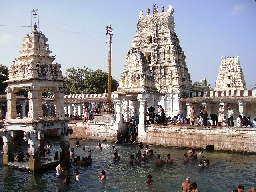
Large kalyani at Mahanandi, Andhra Pradesh

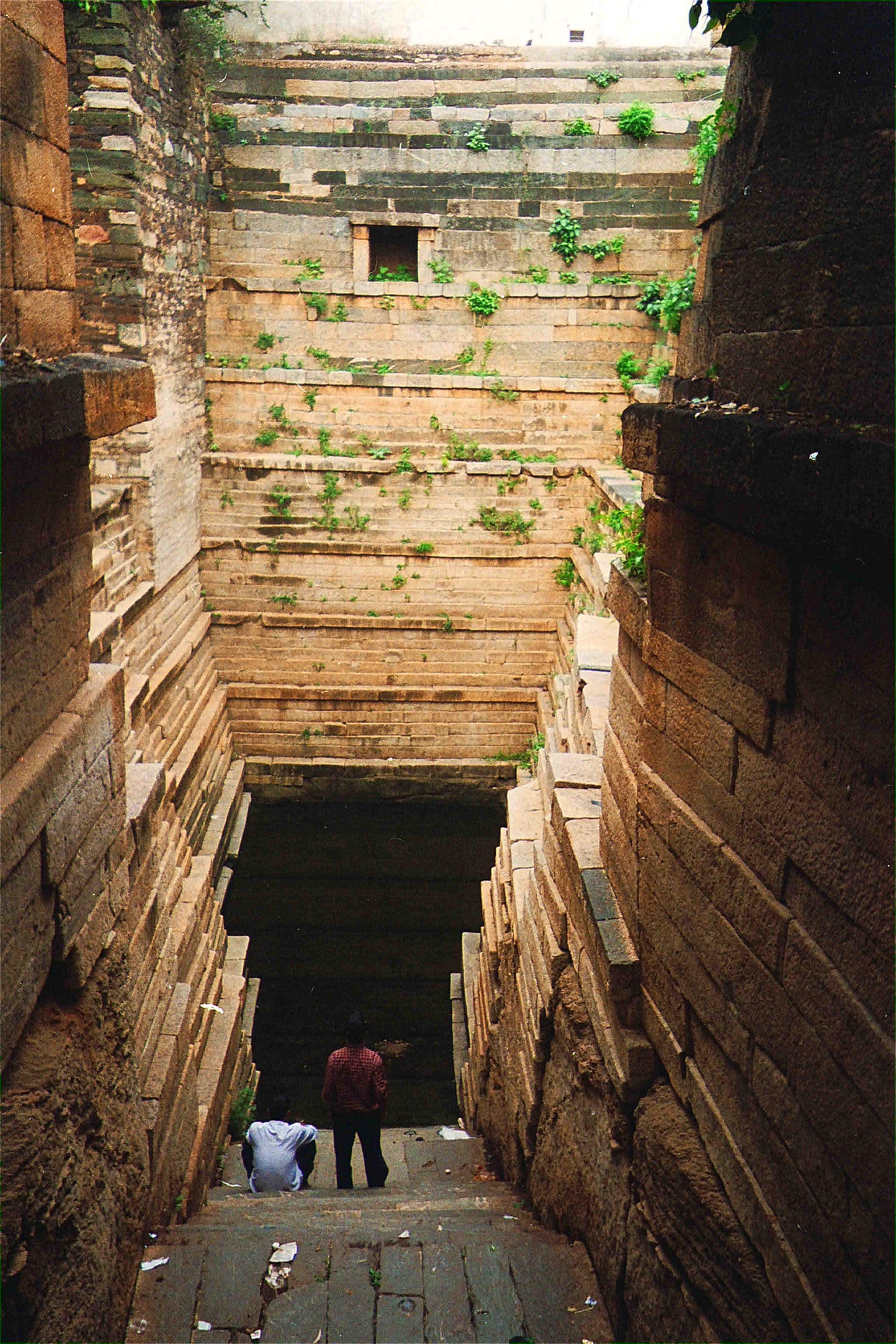
Well at Trikuteshwara temple, Gadag, Karnataka

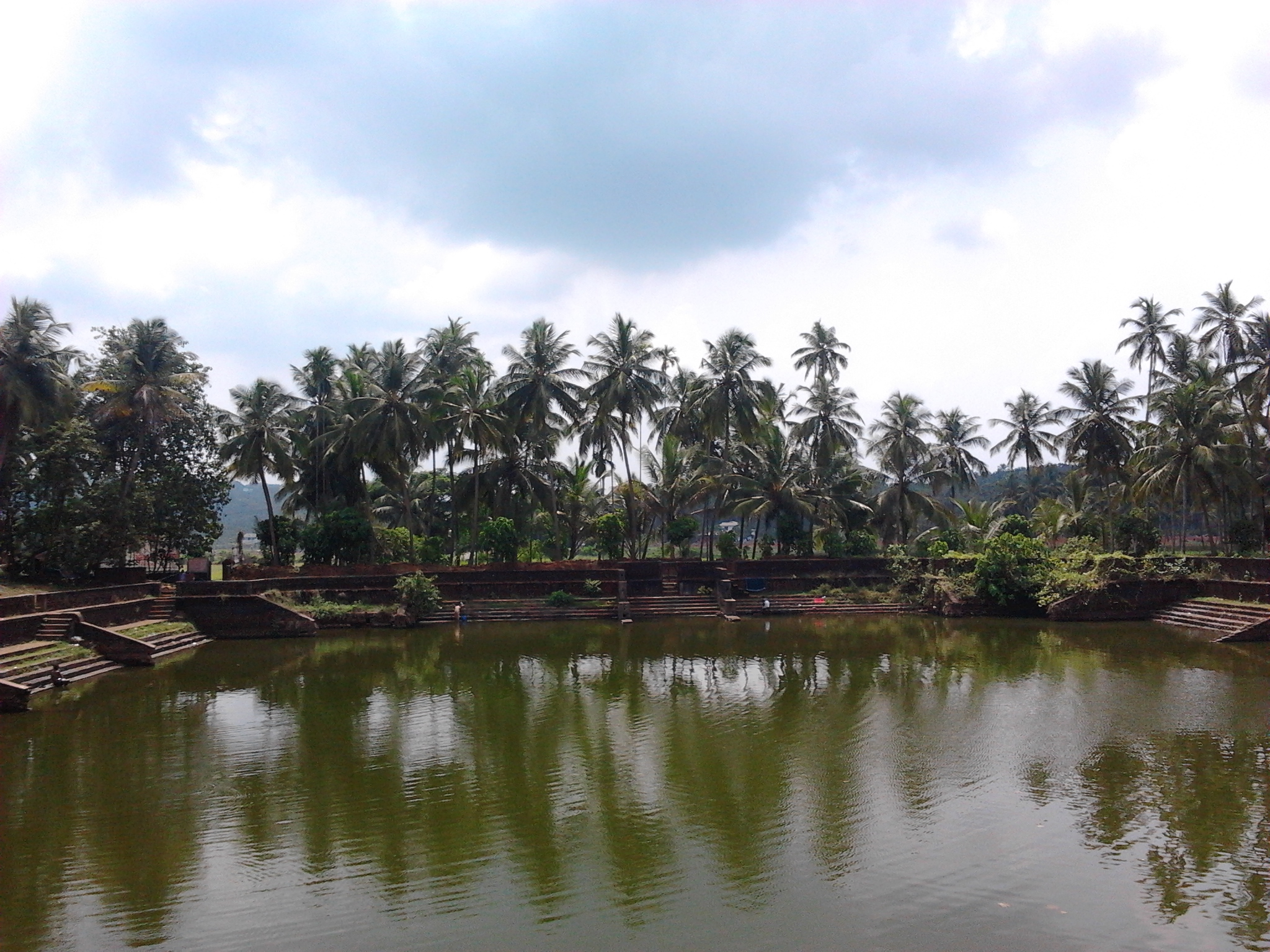
Pond at Shiva temple near Kottakkal, Kerala

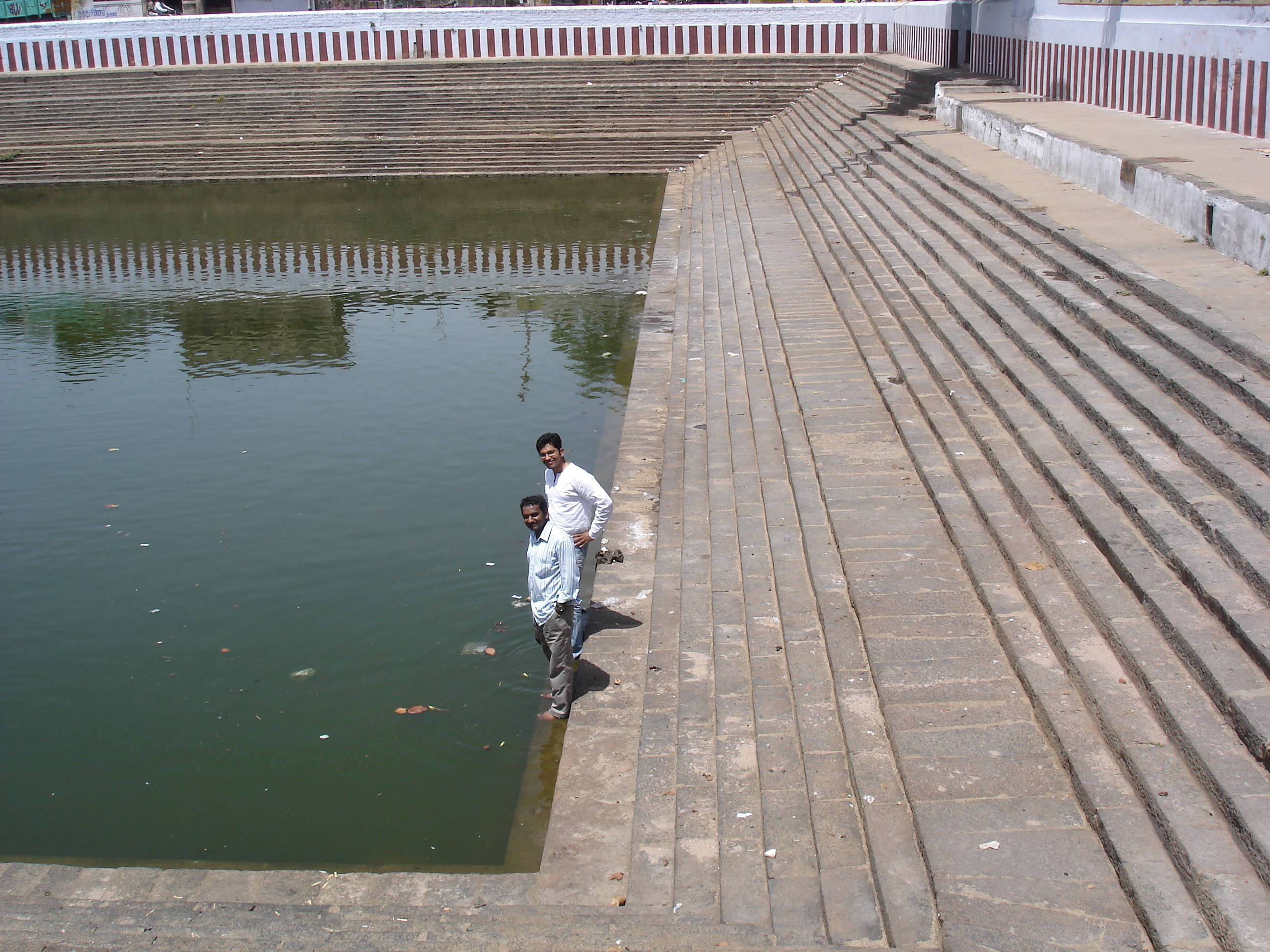
Temple pond on way to Thiruvalllur, Tamil Nadu

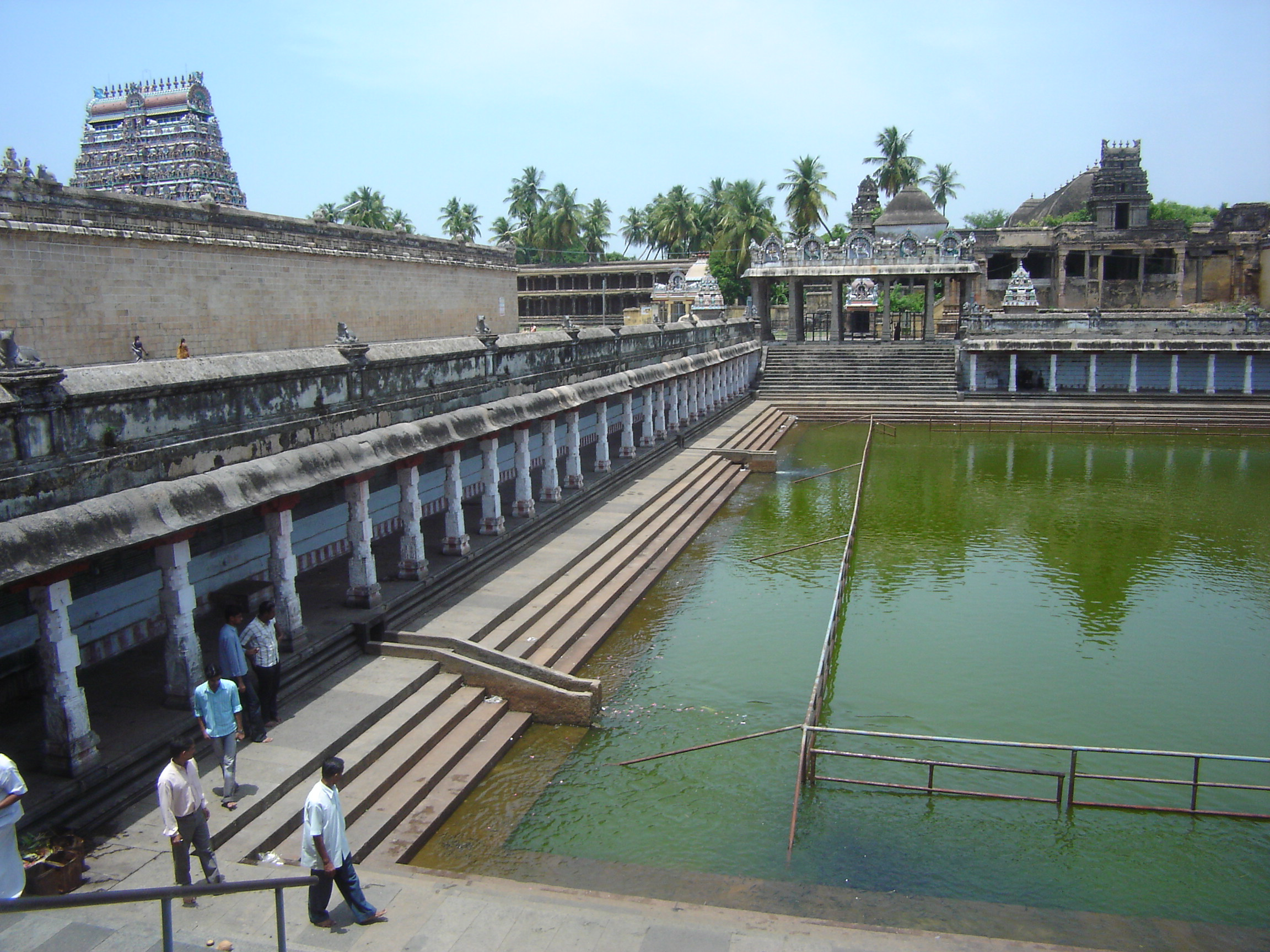
Tank at Thillai Nataraja Temple, Chidambaram, Tamil Nadu

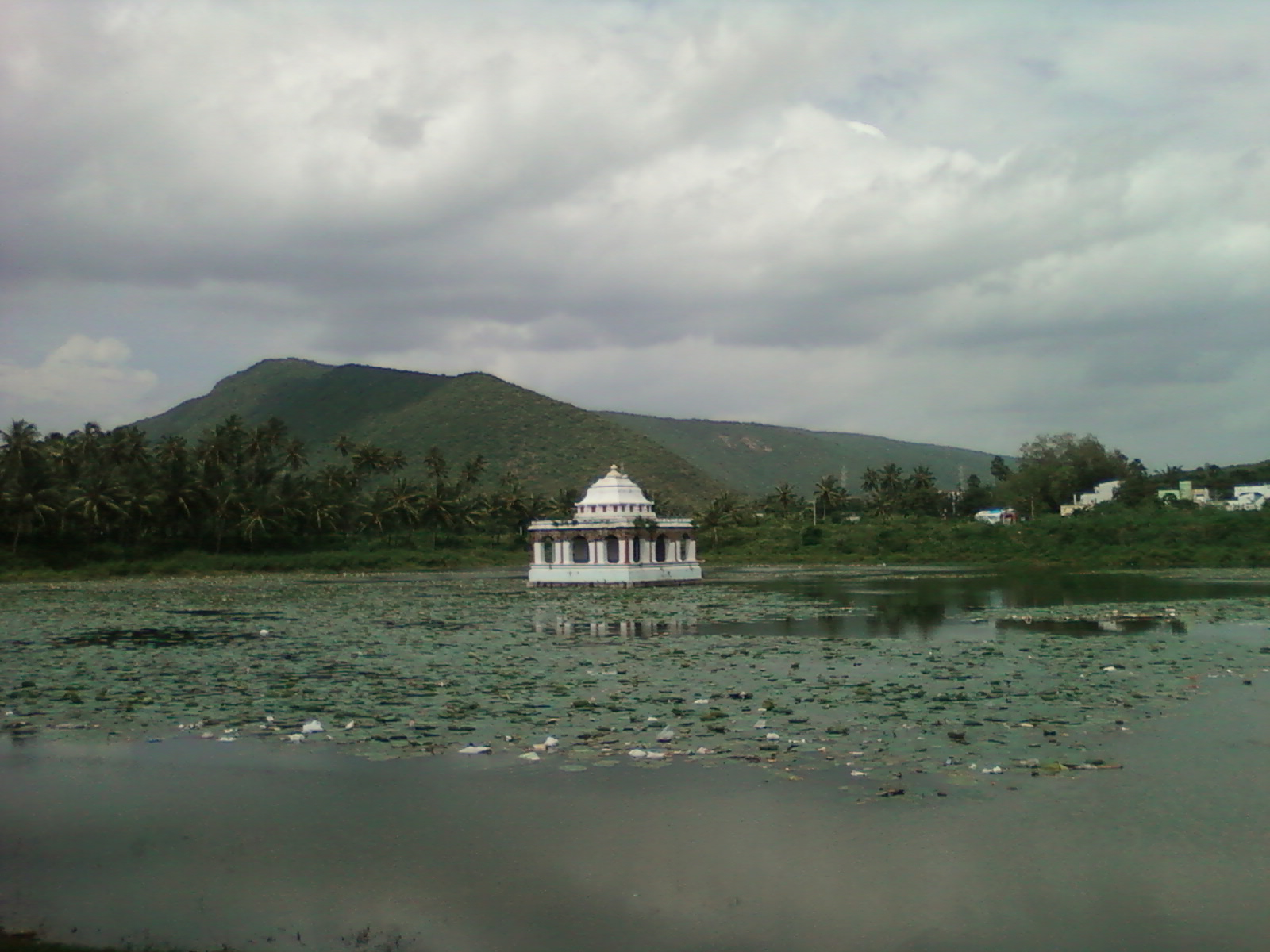
Pushkarini at Simhachalam

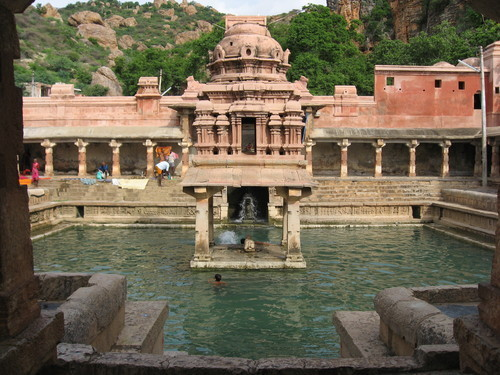
Yaganti Tank in Andhra Pradesh

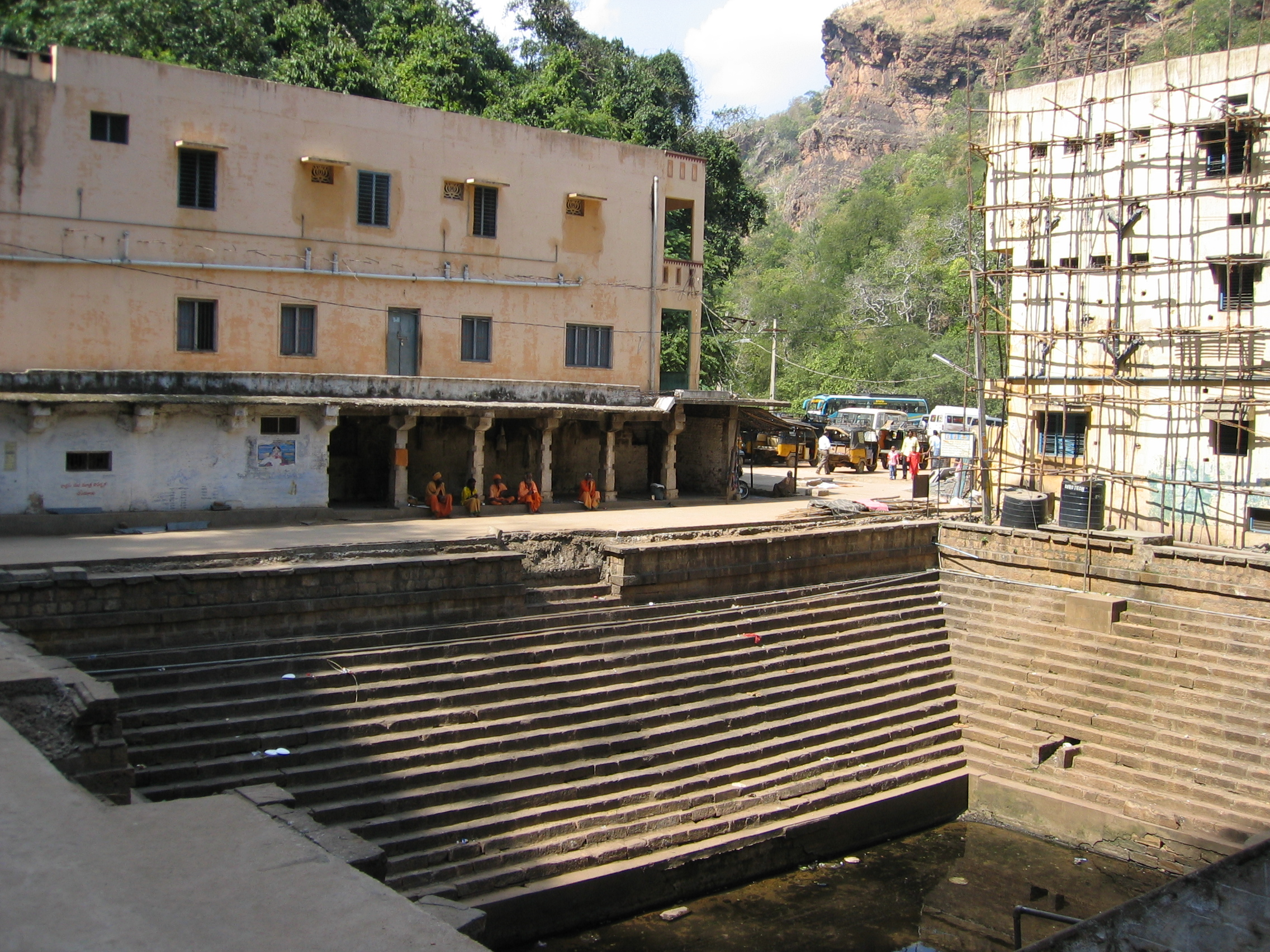
Temple tank, Andhra Pradesh

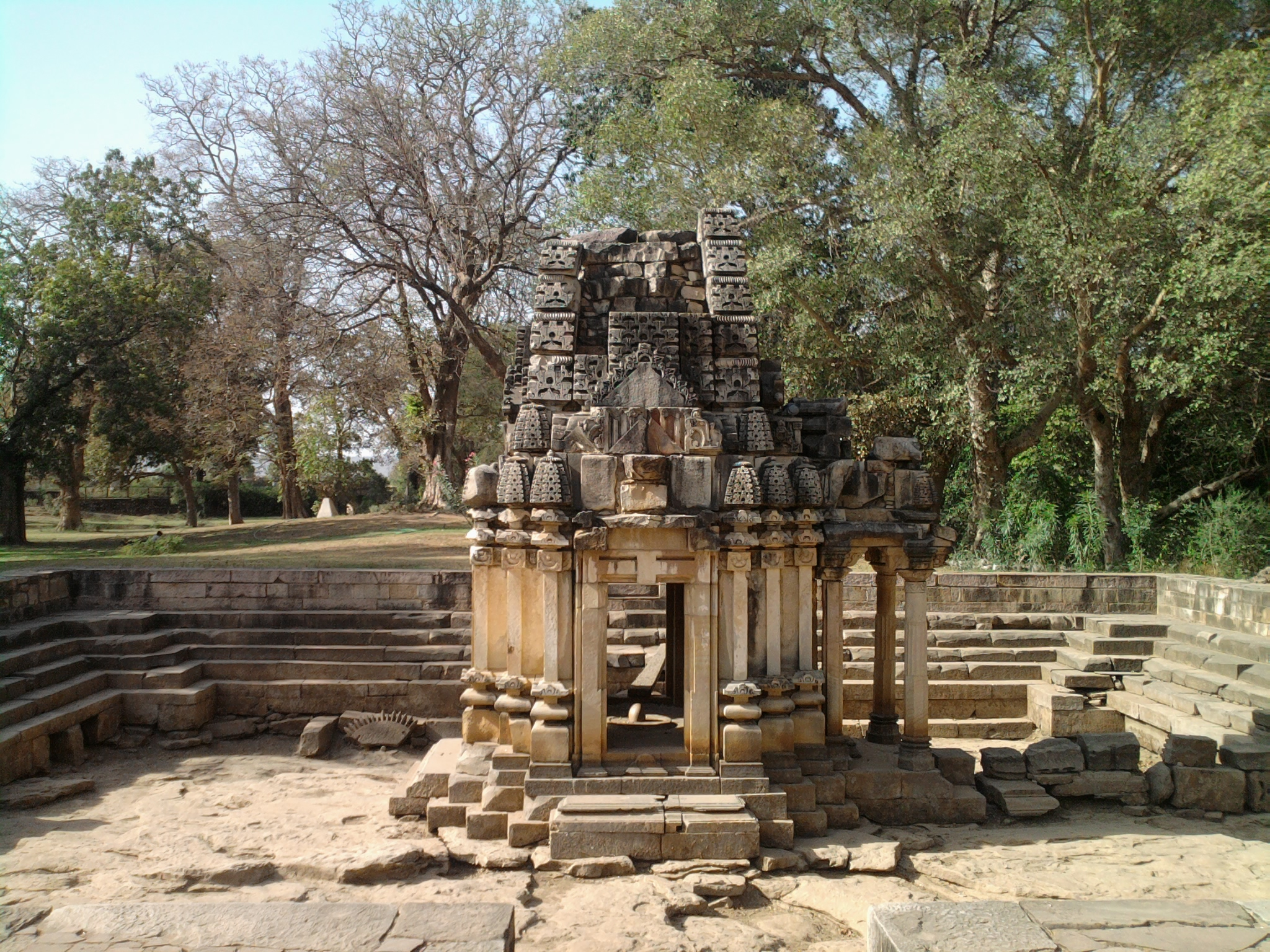
Example of a Shiva temple in a tank (Baroli Temples)

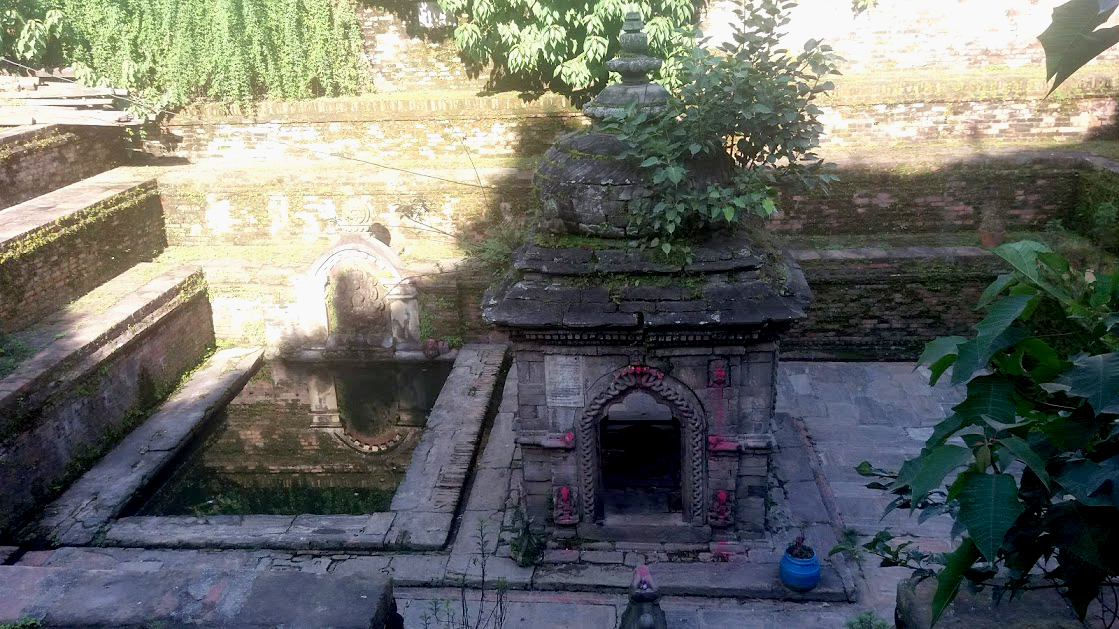
Garuda Kunda in Bhaktapur, Nepal

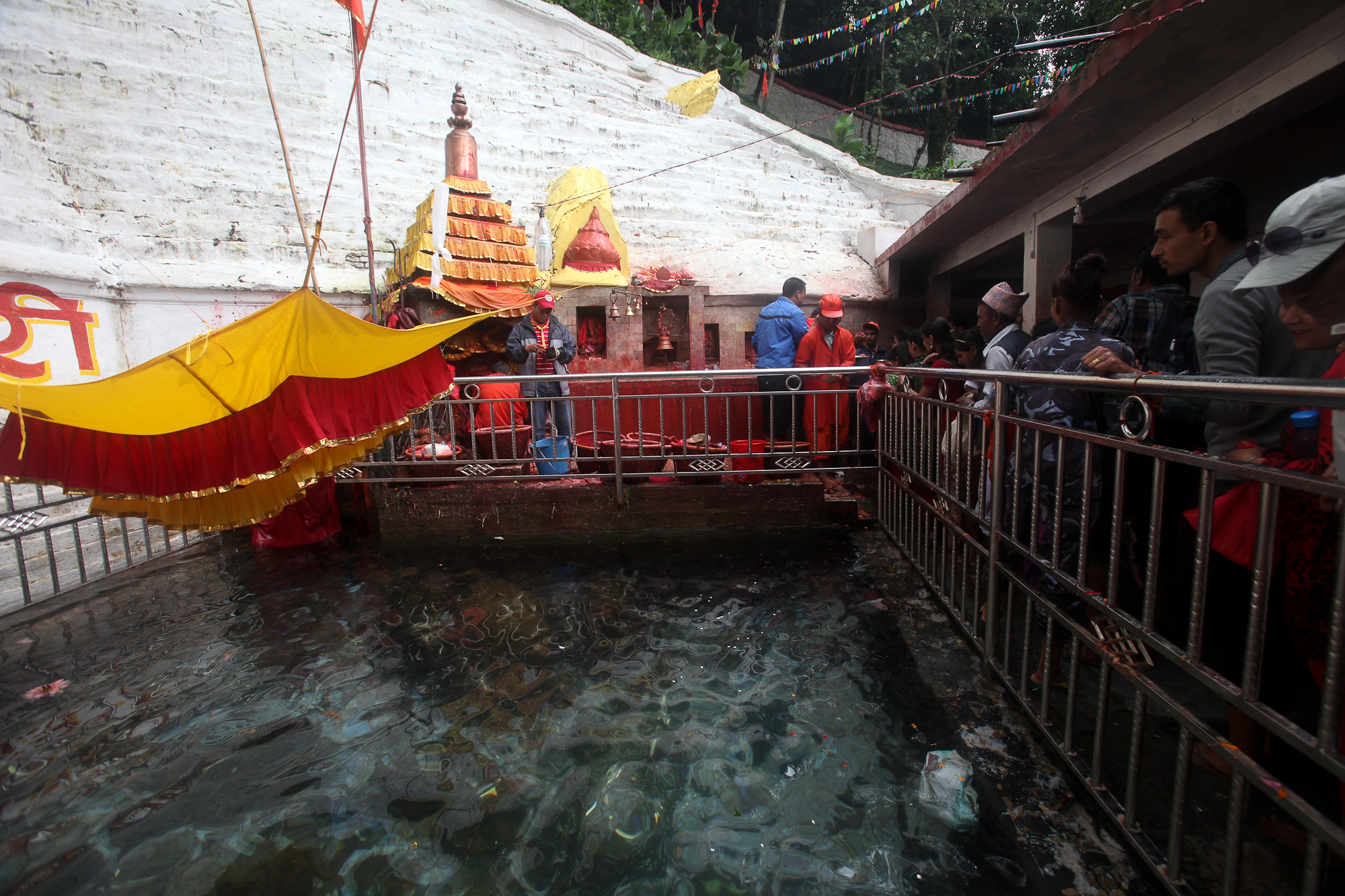
Godawari Kunda, Godawari, Nepal

== See also ==
- Brahma Sarovar
- Ghat
- Baray
- Tank cascade system (Sri Lanka)
- Sacred waters
- Stepwell
- Gauri Kund
