= Kovur mandal, Nellore district =

Kovur mandal
- Mandal
- Interactive map of Kovur mandal
- Location of Kovur Mandal in Andhra Pradesh, India
- Coordinates: 14.5001°N 79.9859°E
- Country: India
- State: Andhra Pradesh
- District: Nellore
- Headquarters: Kovur

Population (2011)
  - Total: 100,958

Languages
  - Official: Telugu
- Time zone: UTC+5:30 (IST)
- PIN: 524137
- Vehicle registration: AP26

Kovur mandal is one of the 46 mandals located on the Nellore district. It is under the Nellore Revenue Division.

In August 2023, the mandal was in news as a leopard killed a girl near Alipiri.

In Padugupadu, Andhra Pragathi Grameena Bank is started in Kovur mandal.
