= Kovur Assembly constituency =

Constituency of the Andhra Pradesh Legislative Assembly, India

Coordinates: 14.50°N 79.99°E

Kovur
- Constituency No. 116 for the Andhra Pradesh Legislative Assembly
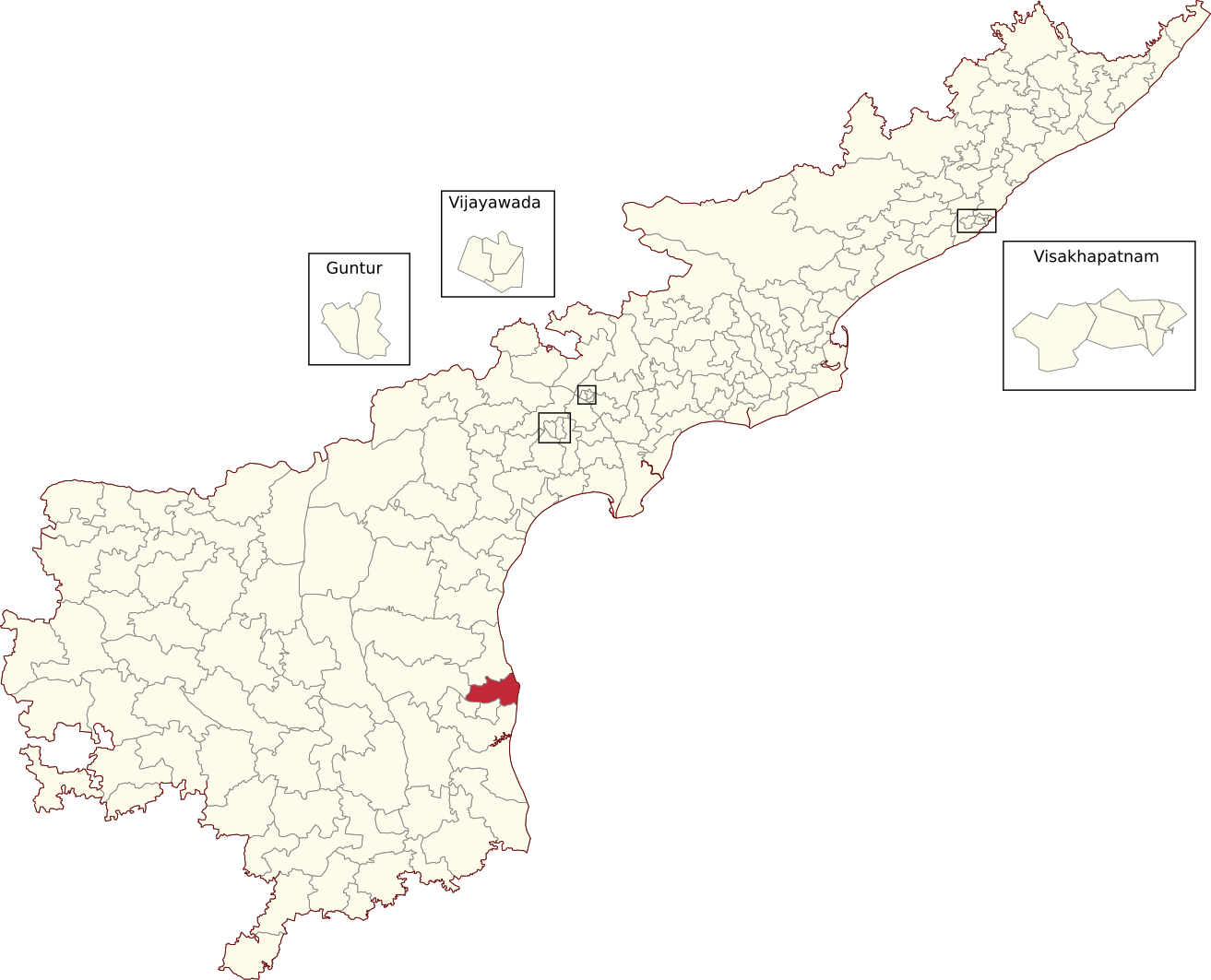
- Location of Kovur Assembly constituency within Andhra Pradesh

Constituency details
- Country: India
- Region: South India
- State: Andhra Pradesh
- District: Nellore
- Lok Sabha constituency: Nellore
- Established: 1951
- Total electors: 264,629
- Reservation: None

Member of Legislative Assembly
- 16th Andhra Pradesh Legislative Assembly
- Incumbent Vemireddy Prashanthi Reddy
- Party: TDP
- Alliance: NDA
- Elected year: 2024

Kovur Assembly constituency is a constituency in Nellore district of Andhra Pradesh that elects representatives to the Andhra Pradesh Legislative Assembly in India. It is one of the seven assembly segments of Nellore Lok Sabha constituency.

Vemireddy Prashanthi Reddy is the current MLA of the constituency, having won the 2024 Andhra Pradesh Legislative Assembly election from Telugu Desam Party. As of 2019, there are a total of 264,629 electors in the constituency. The constituency was established in 1951, as per the Delimitation Orders (1951).

== Mandals ==
Mandal
Vidavalur
Kodavalur
Kovur
Buchireddipalem
Indukurpet

== Members of the Legislative Assembly ==
Year	Member	Political party
1952	Basavareddi Sankarayya	Communist Party of India
1962	Rebala Dasaratharama Reddy	Indian National Congress
1967	V. Venkureddy	Indian National Congress
1972	Pellakuru Ramacandra Reddy	Indian National Congress
1978	Pellakuru Ramacandra Reddy	Indian National Congress
1983	Srinivasulu Reddy Nallapareddy	Telugu Desam Party
1985	Srinivasulu Reddy Nallapareddy	Telugu Desam Party
1989	Srinivasulu Reddy Nallapareddy	Indian National Congress
1994	Nallapareddy Prasanna Kumar Reddy	Telugu Desam Party
1999	Nallapareddy Prasanna Kumar Reddy	Telugu Desam Party
2004	Polamreddy Srinivasulu Reddy	Indian National Congress
2009	Nallapareddy Prasanna Kumar Reddy	Telugu Desam Party
2012	Nallapareddy Prasanna Kumar Reddy	YSR Congress Party
2014	Polamreddy Srinivasulu Reddy	Telugu Desam Party
2019	Nallapareddy Prasanna Kumar Reddy	YSR Congress Party
2024	Vemireddy Prashanthi Reddy	Telugu Desam Party

== Election results ==
=== 2024 ===
2024 Andhra Pradesh Legislative Assembly election: Kovur
Party	Candidate	Votes	%	±%
TDP	Vemireddy Prashanthi Reddy	130,623	60.68	
YSRCP	Nallapareddy Prasanna Kumar Reddy	76,040	35.33	
INC	Kiran Kumar Reddy Narapareddy	3,203	1.49	
NOTA	None of the above	2,377	1.1	
Majority		54,583	25.35	
Turnout		2,15,254		
TDP gain from YSRCP		Swing		

=== 2019 ===
2019 Andhra Pradesh Legislative Assembly election: Kovur
Party	Candidate	Votes	%	±%
YSRCP	Nallapareddy Prasanna Kumar Reddy	116,239	56.55	
TDP	Polamreddy Srinivasulu Reddy	76,348	37.14	
JSP	T. Raghavaiah	5,292	2.57	
BJP	Marem Vijayalakshmi	1,481	0.72	
Majority		39,891		
Turnout		1,99,360	19.66	
Registered electors		264,685		
YSRCP gain from TDP		Swing		

=== 2014 ===
2014 Andhra Pradesh Legislative Assembly election: Kovur
Party	Candidate	Votes	%	±%
TDP	Polamreddy Srinivasulu Reddy	94,108	48.52	
YSRCP	Nallapareddy Prasanna Kumar Reddy	86,171	44.43	
Majority		7,937	4.09	
Turnout		193,941	80.54	+6.13
Registered electors		240,902		
TDP gain from YSRCP		Swing		

=== 2012 by-election ===
2012 Andhra Pradesh Legislative Assembly by-election: Kovur
Party	Candidate	Votes	%	±%
YSRCP	Nallapareddy Prasanna Kumar Reddy	116,239	56.55	
TDP	Somireddy Chandra Mohan Reddy	76,348	37.14	
Majority		39,891		
Turnout		199,360		
YSRCP gain from TDP		Swing		

=== 2009 ===
2009 Andhra Pradesh Legislative Assembly election: Kovur
Party	Candidate	Votes	%	±%
TDP	Nallapareddy Prasanna Kumar Reddy	73,212	43.32	+0.73
INC	Polamreddy Srinivasulu Reddy	65,768	38.91	−4.13
PRP	Tupakula Munemma	22,624	13.39	
Majority		7,444	4.41	
Turnout		169,009	74.41	−0.16
Registered electors		227,130		
TDP gain from INC		Swing		

=== 2004 ===
2004 Andhra Pradesh Legislative Assembly election: Kovur
Party	Candidate	Votes	%	±%
INC	Polamreddy Srinivasulu Reddy	45,270	43.04	+11.14
TDP	Nallapareddy Prasanna Kumar Reddy	44,790	42.59	−18.39
Majority		480	0.45	
Turnout		105,172	74.57	+6.34
Registered electors		141,031		
INC gain from TDP		Swing		

=== 1999 ===
1999 Andhra Pradesh Legislative Assembly election: Kovur
Party	Candidate	Votes	%	±%
TDP	Nallapareddy Prasanna Kumar Reddy	59,981	60.98%	
INC	Kodandarami Reddy Jakka	31,374	31.90%	
Margin of victory		28,607	29.08%	
Turnout		100,302	69.58%	
Registered electors		144,157		
TDP hold		Swing		

=== 1994 ===
1994 Andhra Pradesh Legislative Assembly election: Kovur
Party	Candidate	Votes	%	±%
TDP	Nallapareddy Prasanna Kumar Reddy	60,442	64.91%	
INC	Chevuru Deva Kumar Reddy	25,860	27.77%	
Margin of victory		34,582	37.14%	
Turnout		94,230	69.74%	
Registered electors		135,118		
TDP gain from INC		Swing		

=== 1989 ===
1989 Andhra Pradesh Legislative Assembly election: Kovur
Party	Candidate	Votes	%	±%
INC	Srinivasulu Reddy Nallapareddy	49,589	52.81%	
TDP	Papi Reddy Bezawada	43,202	46.01%	
Margin of victory		6,387	6.80%	
Turnout		96,546	69.69%	
Registered electors		138,542		
INC gain from TDP		Swing		

=== 1985 ===
1985 Andhra Pradesh Legislative Assembly election: Kovur
Party	Candidate	Votes	%	±%
TDP	Srinivasulu Reddy Nallapareddy	46,503	60.38%	
INC	Devakumar Reddy Chevuru	29,426	38.21%	
Margin of victory		17,077	22.17%	
Turnout		78,359	66.42%	
Registered electors		117,968		
TDP hold		Swing		

=== 1983 ===
1983 Andhra Pradesh Legislative Assembly election: Kovur
Party	Candidate	Votes	%	±%
TDP	Srinivasulu Reddy Nallapareddy	36,455	51.50%	
CPI(M)	Jakke Venka Reddy	16,934	23.92%	
Margin of victory		19,521	27.58%	
Turnout		74,298	64.34%	
Registered electors		115,475		
TDP gain from INC(I)		Swing		

=== 1978 ===
1978 Andhra Pradesh Legislative Assembly election: Kovur
Party	Candidate	Votes	%	±%
INC(I)	Pellakuru Ramachandra Reddy	43,213	57.35%	
CPI(M)	Jakka Venka Reddy	23,953	31.79%	
CPI	Gunupati Ramachandra Reddy	5,355	7.11%	
Independent	Obbareddy Dasartharami Reddy	2,082	2.76%	
Margin of victory		19,260	25.56%	
Turnout		76,764	72.79%	
Registered electors		105,460		
INC(I) gain from INC		Swing		

=== 1972 ===
1972 Andhra Pradesh Legislative Assembly election: Kovur
Party	Candidate	Votes	%	±%
INC	Pellakuru Ramachandra Reddy	31,870	52.92%	
CPI	Gunupati Ramachandra Reddy	27,366	45.44%	
Margin of victory		4,504	7.48%	
Turnout		61,546	65.62%	
Registered electors		93,794		
INC hold		Swing		

=== 1967 ===
1967 Andhra Pradesh Legislative Assembly election: Kovur
Party	Candidate	Votes	%	±%
INC	Vemareddy Venkureddy	31,994	54.71%	
CPI(M)	J Kotaiah	23,674	40.48%	
Margin of victory		8,320	14.23%	
Turnout		58,482	74.28%	
Registered electors		82,972		
INC hold		Swing		

=== 1962 ===
1962 Andhra Pradesh Legislative Assembly election: Kovur
Party	Candidate	Votes	%	±%
INC	Rebala Dasaratharma Reddy	29,914	50.44%	
CPI	Baswareddy Sankaraiah	29,391	49.56%	
Margin of victory		523	0.88%	
Turnout		61,183	78.91%	
Registered electors		77,536		
INC gain from CPI		Swing		

=== 1952 ===
1952 Madras State Legislative Assembly election: Kovur
Party	Candidate	Votes	%	±%
CPI	Basavareddi Sankarayya	25,435	57.26%	
INC	B. Seshu Reddi	9,290	20.91%	20.91%
Independent	Kotiruraddi Veerareddi	4,104	9.24%	
Independent	Morla Yanadayya	1,906	4.29%	
Independent	T. Ramakrishna	1,367	3.08%	
Socialist Party (India)	K. Ramanayya	1,237	2.78%	
Independent	V. Subramanyam	1,084	2.44%	
Margin of victory		16,145	36.34%	
Turnout		44,423	63.63%	
Registered electors		69,817		
CPI win (new seat)				

- List of constituencies of Andhra Pradesh Legislative Assembly

== See also ==
- List of constituencies of Andhra Pradesh Vidhan Sabha
