= Nandyal =

Nandyala Nandi-Aalayam
- City
- Nandyal
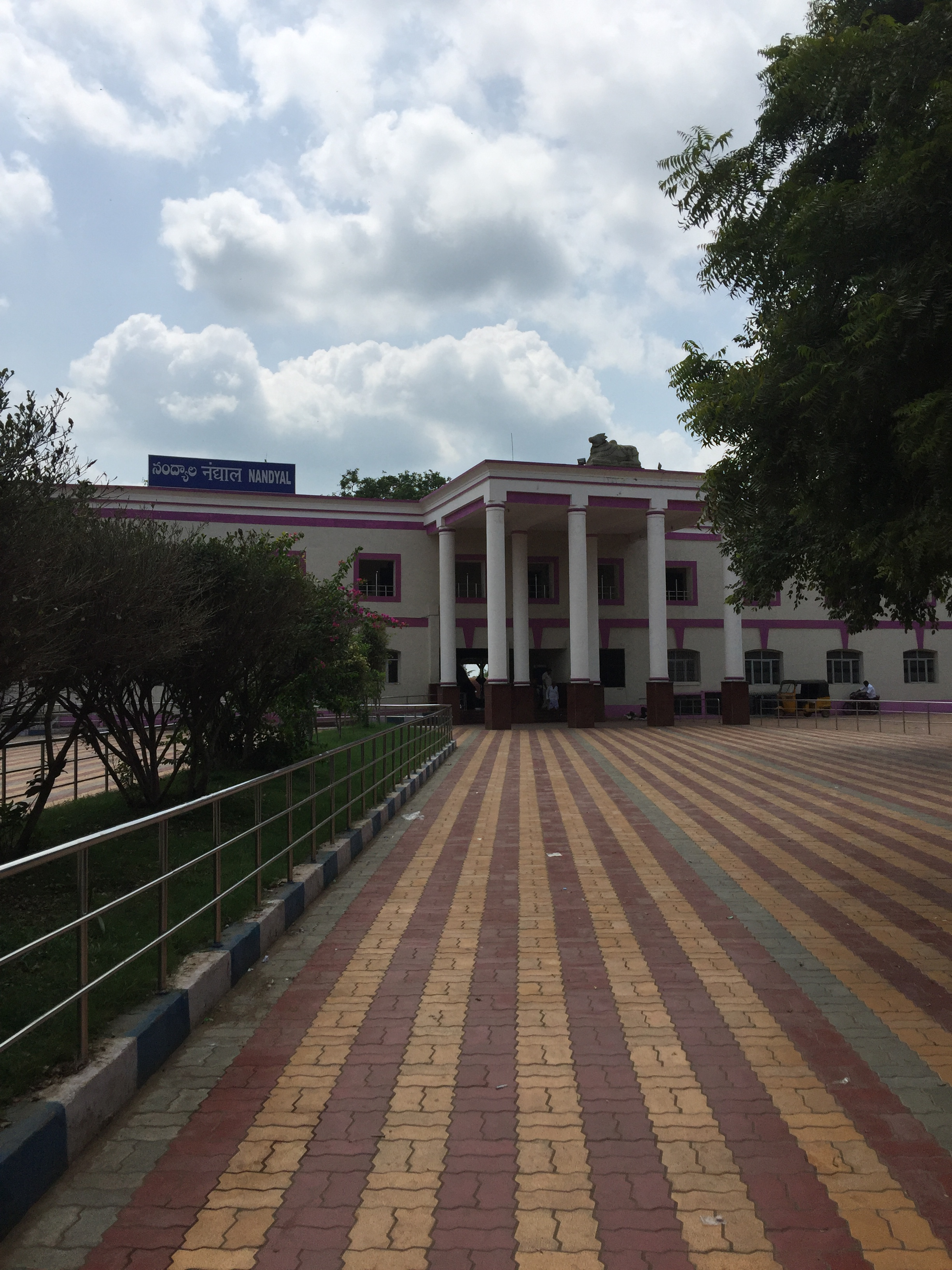
- Nandyal Junction Main Entrance

- Location in Andhra Pradesh, India
- Coordinates: 15.48°N 78.48°E
- Country: India
- State: Andhra Pradesh
- District: Nandyal
- Incorporated (municipality): 1899
- Incorporated (city): 1991

Government
  - Type: Municipal council

Area
  - City: 33.67 km^{2} (13.00 sq mi)
- Elevation: 203 m (666 ft)

Population (2011)
  - City: 300,000
  - Rank: 13th (in state)
  - Density: 8,900/km^{2} (23,000/sq mi)
  - Metro: 211,424

Languages
  - Official: Telugu
- Time zone: UTC+5:30 (IST)
- PIN: 518501,518502
- Vehicle registration: AP–21
- Website: Nandyal Municipality

Nandyal, commonly called as Nandyala, is the administrative headquarters of the Nandyal district in the Rayalaseema region of Andhra Pradesh, India. It was officially formed as a separate district on April 4, 2022, after being carved out of the larger Kurnool district. The town is situated at an elevation of approximately 203 meters (666 ft) above sea level and is surrounded by the scenic Nallamala and Erramala mountain ranges. It is a Municipal corporation and the headquarters of Nandyal mandal in Nandyal revenue division.

== Etymology ==
The name "Nandyal" is derived from "Nandi-Aalayam" (meaning the Abode of Nandi, the sacred bull and mount of Lord Shiva). Nandyal is famous for being surrounded by nine sacred shrines dedicated to Lord Shiva, collectively known as the Nava Nandulu (Nine Nandis), all located within a 15-kilometer radius of the town. The district is often referred to as the "Sacred District of Nandi Temples" and Historically, the region has been a significant center of Shaivism.

== History ==
=== Prehistoric & Ancient Eras ===
The Nandyal district contains some of the oldest records of human habitation in South India. The Yerramala and Nallamala hill ranges feature extensive Paleolithic and Mesolithic rock art sites, most notably at Ketavaram and Yaganti, dating back over 35,000 years. The region was later ruled by the Mauryan Empire under Ashoka (3rd Century BCE)—as evidenced by nearby minor rock edicts at Yerragudi—followed by nearly four centuries of Satavahana Dynasty rule.

=== Medieval Dynasties & Architectural Foundations ===
Between the 7th and 14th centuries CE, the region was governed by the Badami Chalukyas, the Renadu Cholas, and the Kakatiya Dynasty of Warangal.

The Chalukyas laid the architectural foundations of the region, including the early stone structures of the Mahanandiswara Swamy Temple in the 7th century.

In the 10th century, local Nanda kings formalized the sacred Nava Nandulu (Nine Nandis) pilgrimage circuit centered around Nandyal town.

=== The Vijayanagara Golden Age (14th–16th Centuries) ===
The region reached its cultural and architectural zenith under the Vijayanagara Empire (1336–1646). Emperors like Krishnadevaraya took a personal interest in the district, fortifying towns and issuing massive land grants to major spiritual centers like Ahobilam, Mahanandi, and Srisailam. The empire introduced standard Dravidian architecture to local temples, including towering Gopurams and intricately carved Mandapas (pillared halls).

=== Islamic Rule & Banaganapalli State (16th–19th Centuries) ===
Following the fall of Vijayanagara at the Battle of Talikota (1565), control shifted to the Golconda Sultanate and later to the Mughal Empire under Aurangzeb in 1687. A defining historical feature of this period was the establishment of the autonomous Banaganapalli Princely State, ruled by a Shi'ite Muslim dynasty of Nawabs, which lasted until Indian independence.

=== British Rule & The Coining of "Rayalaseema" ===
In 1800, the Nizam of Hyderabad transferred the region to the British East India Company, and it became part of the "Ceded Districts" under the Madras Presidency.

A historic turning point occurred in November 1928 at the Andhra Maha Sabha conference held in Nandyal town. Nationalist leader Chilukuri Narayana Rao moved a successful resolution to rename the colonial "Ceded Districts" to "Rayalaseema" (The Land of the Rayas) to honor the Vijayanagara legacy, making Nandyal the birthplace of the modern region's socio-political identity.

== Culture & Significance ==
=== Mahanandiswara Swamy Temple, Mahanandi ===
Mahanandi is a prominent pilgrimage village located east of the Nallamala Hills in the Nandyal district. It is home to the ancient Mahanandiswara Swamy Temple, which is considered the most significant and largest of the Nava Nandulu shrines. These temples is dedicated to Lord Shiva and shaivism.

The list of Nava Nandulu in their traditional, practical geographic route order:

1. Prathama Nandi: Situated on a lane of Nandyal and Bommalasatram.

2. Naga Nandi: Located inside an Anjaneya (Hanuman) temple near the main Nandyal bus stand.

3. Soma Nandi: Located towards the eastern edge of Nandyal town.

4. Surya Nandi: Positioned on the approach road to Mahanandi near U. Bollavaram village.

5. Shiva Nandi: Located further along the forest route towards Mahanandi.

6. Vishnu Nandi (Krishnanandi): Tucked away along the Telugu Ganga canal banks.

7. Garuda Nandi: Located just outside the perimeter of the Mahanandi village, identifiable by a massive Nandi statue.

8. Mahanandi: The primary temple destination.

9. Vinayaka Nandi: A small shrine located to the left of the exit Gopuram of the main Mahanandi temple.

=== Srisailam Temple ===
Srisailam temple also Sri Bhramaramba Mallikarjuna Swamy Devasthanam is significant to the Hindu sects of both Shaivism and Shaktism as this temple is referred to as one of the twelve Jyotirlingas of Shiva and as one of the fifty two Shakta pithas, centres of the Hindu goddess. Shiva is worshiped as Mallikarjuna and is represented by the lingam. His consort Parvati is depicted as Bhramaramba. This temple is in Nandyal district and is 163 km from Nandyal.

=== Ahobilam ===
Ahobilam is the centre of worship of Lord Narasimha, the lion-headed avatar of Vishnu, along with his consort Pratyangira, an avatar of Lakshmi. Ahobilam is in the Nallamala section Eastern Ghats with several mountain hills and gorges. Ahobilam range is 63.8 km from Nandyal.

== Demographics ==
In the 2011 census of India, Nandyal had a population of 211,424 making it the 13th most populous town in the state.

== Governance ==
=== Civic administration ===
Nandyal municipality was constituted in the year 1899. The jurisdictional area is spread over an area of 19 km^{2} (7.3 mi^{2}). Its urban agglomeration is spread over an area of 33.67 km^{2} (13.00 sq mi) which includes constituents of Nandyal municipality, out growths of Moolasagaram, Noonepalle and partial outgrowths of Udumalpuram, Ayyalur.

== Culture and tourism ==
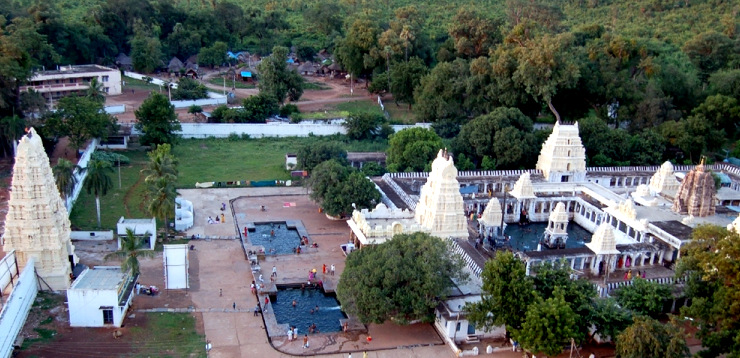
Mahanandi

Nandyal is encircled by nine sacred temples referred to as the Nava Nandi. Sri Yaganti Uma Maheswara Temple near Nandyal has one of the largest Nandi idols of the world wide. As per the Archaeological Survey of India, the rock grows at a rate of 1 inch (2.5 cm) per 20 years. Nandyal District also includes of Belum Caves, Mahanandi and Srisailam.

== Climate ==
Climate data for Nandyal (1991–2020, extremes 1966–present)
Month	Jan	Feb	Mar	Apr	May	Jun	Jul	Aug	Sep	Oct	Nov	Dec	Year
Record high °C (°F)	37.4 (99.3)	40.5 (104.9)	43.0 (109.4)	46.2 (115.2)	46.3 (115.3)	45.4 (113.7)	41.8 (107.2)	39.7 (103.5)	38.8 (101.8)	38.2 (100.8)	35.5 (95.9)	36.8 (98.2)	46.3 (115.3)
Mean daily maximum °C (°F)	31.9 (89.4)	34.8 (94.6)	38.2 (100.8)	40.3 (104.5)	40.7 (105.3)	37.0 (98.6)	34.6 (94.3)	33.4 (92.1)	33.0 (91.4)	32.6 (90.7)	31.4 (88.5)	30.6 (87.1)	34.8 (94.6)
Mean daily minimum °C (°F)	17.2 (63.0)	19.1 (66.4)	22.3 (72.1)	25.7 (78.3)	27.4 (81.3)	25.9 (78.6)	24.8 (76.6)	24.5 (76.1)	24.2 (75.6)	23.3 (73.9)	20.7 (69.3)	17.7 (63.9)	22.7 (72.9)
Record low °C (°F)	9.2 (48.6)	12.0 (53.6)	12.2 (54.0)	18.5 (65.3)	17.1 (62.8)	17.5 (63.5)	18.2 (64.8)	18.5 (65.3)	16.1 (61.0)	10.5 (50.9)	12.7 (54.9)	9.6 (49.3)	9.2 (48.6)
Average rainfall mm (inches)	3.2 (0.13)	2.3 (0.09)	2.3 (0.09)	13.2 (0.52)	44.8 (1.76)	117.7 (4.63)	144.9 (5.70)	146.4 (5.76)	157.3 (6.19)	117.9 (4.64)	22.8 (0.90)	2.3 (0.09)	775.2 (30.52)
Average rainy days	0.3	0.2	0.3	1.1	2.7	6.0	8.3	8.6	7.7	5.7	1.9	0.4	43.2
Average relative humidity (%) (at 17:30 IST)	41	34	27	29	31	45	54	57	61	63	58	50	46
Source: India Meteorological Department

== Economy ==
The city is a major hub of industry and agriculture. It is rich in natural resources like marble. There are many rice mills and industries which produce milk, soft drinks, sugar, PVC pipes, etc. Some of the renowned industries in the City are the Vijaya Dairy, Nandi Dairy, Nandi Pipes, Nandi Polymers, S. P. Y. Agro, Nandi Steels, etc.

== Transport ==
The Andhra Pradesh State Road Transport Corporation operates bus services from Nandyal bus station. Nandyal Junction Railway Station is administered under Guntur railway division of South Central Railways. Kurnool Airport is 50 km from Nandyal.

== Education ==
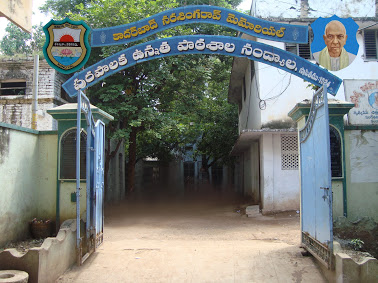
Nandyal Municipal High School named after Kaderbad Narasinga Rao

The primary and secondary school education is imparted by government, aided and private schools, under the School Education Department of the state. A government medical college, GMC Nandyal was established in 2023 by the government of Andhra Pradesh.

== See also ==
- List of cities in Andhra Pradesh by population
- List of municipal corporations in Andhra Pradesh
- Maseedupuram
