= Nallapareddy Prasanna Kumar Reddy =

Indian politician

Member of Legislative Assembly Andhra Pradesh
- In office 2019–2024
- Preceded by: Polamreddy Srinivasulu Reddy
- Succeeded by: Vemireddy Prashanthi Reddy
- Constituency: Kovur
- In office 2009–2014
- Preceded by: Polamreddy Srinivasulu Reddy
- Succeeded by: Polamreddy Srinivasulu Reddy
- Constituency: Kovur
- In office 1994–2004
- Preceded by: Srinivasulu Reddy Nallapareddy
- Succeeded by: Polamreddy Srinivasulu Reddy
- Constituency: Kovur

Nallapareddy Prasanna Kumar Reddy (born 1963) is an Indian politician from Andhra Pradesh. He is a six-time MLA from Kovur Assembly Constituency in Nellore District. He won the 2019 Andhra Pradesh Legislative Assembly Election representing YSR Congress Party. He is nominated again by YSRCP to contest the Kovur seat in the 2024 Assembly Election.

== Early life and education ==
Reddy was born in Hyderabad. His mother is Srilakshmamma and his late father Nallapareddy Srinivasulu Reddy was a four-time MLA and also served as chairman of Andhra Pradesh Road Transport Corporation. Reddy completed his B.A from Nizam College, Osmania University in 1984. He married N. Geetha Reddy and has a son Rajat Kumar Reddy.

== Career ==
Reddy began his political career in 1993, stepping into the shoes of his father who died in February 1993. He became MLA for the first time winning the 1993 byelection and retained it in the 1994 Andhra Pradesh Legislative Assembly Election representing Telugu Desam Party from Kovur Assembly Constituency. He won again on TDP ticket in 1999 but lost the next election in 2004. He regained his Kovur seat again in 2009 once again on TDP ticket. Later, he shifted to YSR Congress Party and won the 2012 Andhra Pradesh by-elections defeating his maternal uncle Chandramohan Reddy. He won as MLA for the fourth time in the 2019 Andhra Pradesh Legislative Assembly Election on YSR Congress Party defeating Polam Reddy Srinivasulu Reddy of Telugu Desam Party by a margin of 39,891 votes. Later, he served as a Minister of Sugar Industries, Commerce, and Exports in YS Jagan Mohan Reddy government.
