= Maseedupuram =

- village
- Interactive map of Maseedupuram
- Country: India
- State: Andhra Pradesh
- District: Nandyal
- Mandal: Mahanandi

Languages
  - Official: Telugu
- Time zone: UTC+5:30 (IST)

Maseedupuram is an agricultural village located in Mahanandi mandal, Nandyala district in Andhra Pradesh, a southern state of India.
