= Atchampeta =

Acchampeta
- village
- Interactive map of Acchampeta
- Location in Andhra Pradesh, India Acchampeta (India)
- Coordinates: 15.541206°N 78.950307°E
- Country: India
- State: Andhra Pradesh
- District: Markapuram
- Talukas: Racherla
- Elevation: 224 m (735 ft)

Languages
  - Official: Telugu
- Time zone: UTC+5:30 (IST)
- PIN: 523368
- Telephone code: 08405
- Vehicle registration: AP

Acchampeta (or Atchampeta) is a hamlet in Racherla mandal, Markapuram District of Andhra Pradesh, India. The village forms a panchayat segment with Chinaganapalle village.

== Geography ==
It is located at a distance of 135 km (84 mi) from Ongole and 80 km (50 mi) from Nandyal. The village has an altitude of 224m.

== Economy ==
The village relies on agriculture for its subsistence. Water for farming is supplied through underground borewells, which have seen their levels decrease substantially due to drought. The village also has a primary school for 1st through 5th grade and a small temple to Lord Shri Ram.
