= Nallapareddy Srinivasulu Reddy =

Indian politician

Member of Legislative Assembly Andhra Pradesh
- In office 1983–1993
- Preceded by: Pellakuru Ramachandra Reddy
- Succeeded by: Nallapareddy Prasanna Kumar Reddy
- Constituency: Kovur
- In office 1978–1983
- Preceded by: Orepalli Venkatasubbaiah
- Succeeded by: Nallareddy Chandrasekhara Reddy
- Constituency: Venkatagiri
- In office 1972–1978
- Preceded by: V. Ramachandra Reddy
- Succeeded by: Patra Prakasa Rao
- Constituency: Gudur

Personal details
- Born: 30 April 1933 Kota, Nellore district
- Died: 23 February 1993 (aged 59) Kota, Nellore district
- Occupation: Politician

Nallapareddy Srinivasulu Reddy, also known as NSR, was an Indian politician from Andhra Pradesh state. He won as the MLA from five times. He represented the Gudur Constituency, Venkatagiri Constituency, once each, and Kovur Assembly Constituency for three terms. The Nellore barrage was named after him in February 2023.

== Early life and education ==
Reddy was born in Kota, Nellore district. He did his graduation and post graduation from Andhra University. He was elected as the President of Andhra University Hostel's literary Association on Students' Congress ticket in 1955. He was the vice-president of Andhra University Students Congress and a member of the State Executive of the Student's Congress.

== Political career ==
NSR entered active politics in 1962. He was the President of Kota Panchayat Samiti for 10 years (1962–72). He was elected to Andhra Pradesh Legislative Assembly as an independent candidate from Gudur constituency in 1972, and led Socialist democratic front on the floor of assembly till 1977.

Just before Lok Sabha elections he was admitted into Congress. He has created record in the history of Assembly by never absenting even a single sitting since he was elected from 1972. He was vice-president of the Nellore District Congress Committee for sometime.

He became a Cabinet Minister on 2 December 1980, and revitalised the Sugar Industry, as a Minister in-charge of Sugar Industry. He organized a 'Petitions Day', on which he received and disposed of thousands of petitions from the weaker sections and small farmers and others.

The Road Transport Corporation required a leader like NSR as its chairman. Perhaps it was with this intention that the Chief Minister T. Anjaiah had selected N.S.R. as the chairman of R.T.C.

He was introduced as a Cabinet Minister in the ministry headed by T. Anjaiah on 24 February 1981 and was in-charge of Panchayat Raj portfolio till 24 February 1982. He was elected on 'Telugu Desam' ticket from Kovur constituency in January 1983 and was a Cabinet Minister for works in the ministry headed by N. T. Rama Rao till 15 August 1984.

He stood by Chief Minister N. T. Rama Rao, when ministry was dismissed by the Governor Ram Lal, and was inducted into the ministry by NTR when he formed the ministry on 16 September 1984. NSR was in-charge of Finance and Power portfolio.

He was again elected to the Assembly on Telugu Desam Party ticket from the same Kovur Assembly Constituency on 5 March 1985 and inducted as Cabinet Minister for Revenue portfolio. He was No. 2 in the Cabinet.

NTR removed NSR from his cabinet on 12 November 1987. NSR started statewide tour and conducted 250 public meetings under the banner of 'Seenaiah Sena' (Voluntary Organization) fighting against N.T.R.'s rule.

Seenaiah Sena merged in Congress (I) at New Delhi on 6 April 1989. NSR was nominated as campaign committee member of APCC in May 1989. NSR has again been elected on Congress ticket from Kovur Assembly Constituency in November 1989 and became Minister in M. Chenna Reddy's Cabinet. He resigned from his ministry on 9 December 1990 as a protest against failure of Law and Order in the state.

=== As Assembly member ===
Year	Party	Constituency	Result
1972	Independent	Gudur	Won
1978	Indian National Congress	Venkatagiri	Won
1983	Telugu Desam Party	Kovur	Won
1985	Telugu Desam Party	Kovur	Won
1989	Indian National Congress	Kovur	Won
