= 1985 Andhra Pradesh Legislative Assembly election =

- 5 March 1985

294 seats in the Andhra Pradesh Legislative Assembly 148 seats needed for a majority
- Registered: 34,587,372
- Turnout: 23,370,750 (67.57%) ▼0.13%
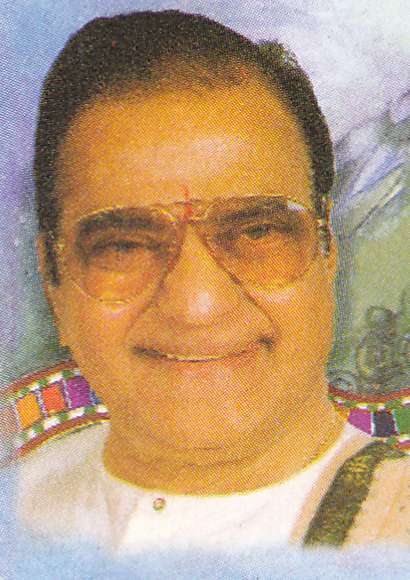

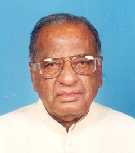
	Majority party	Minority party
Leader	N. T. Rama Rao	Kotla Vijaya Bhaskara Reddy
Party	TDP	INC(I)
Alliance	TDP+	–
Leader since	1982	1982
Leader's seat	Hindupur (won; retained), Gudivada (won; vacated), Nalgonda (won; vacated)	Yemmiganur (won)
Last election	201 seats, 46.30%	60 seats, 33.58%
Seats won	202	50
Seat change	▲1	▼10
Popular vote	10,625,508	8,566,891
Percentage	46.21%	37.25%
Swing	▼0.09%	▲3.67%
- 1985 Andhra Pradesh Legislative Assembly election results
Chief minister before election
N. T. Rama Rao
TDP
Chief minister after election
N. T. Rama Rao
TDP

The 1985 Andhra Pradesh Legislative Assembly election took place in January 1985 in 294 constituencies in Andhra Pradesh, India. The elections were conducted to elect the government in the state of Andhra Pradesh for the next five years. The TDP secured a huge majority winning 202 seats. The Indian National Congress winning only 50 seats.

== Parties and alliances ==
Alliance/Party		Flag	Symbol	Leader	Seats contested	
TDP+	Telugu Desam Party			N. T. Rama Rao	250	287
TDP+	Communist Party of India			Chilumula Vittal Reddy (Note: this is the Floor Leader of the party)	15	287
TDP+	Communist Party of India (Marxist)			Narra Raghava Reddy	12	287
TDP+	Bharatiya Janata Party			P. V. Chalapathi Rao	10	287
Indian National Congress				Y. S. Rajasekhara Reddy	290	

== Results ==
=== Vote share ===
Vote share by party
1. Telugu Desam Party (46.2%)
2. Indian National Congress (37.2%)
3. Communist Party of India (2.69%)
4. Communist Party of India (Marxist) (2.31%)
5. Bharatiya Janata Party (1.62%)
6. Others (9.92%)

=== Seat share ===
Seat share by party
1. Telugu Desam Party (68.7%)
2. Indian National Congress (17.0%)
3. Communist Party of India (3.74%)
4. Communist Party of India (Marxist) (3.74%)
5. Bharatiya Janata Party (2.72%)
6. Others (4.10%)

=== Results by party ===
Source: Election Commission of India
Alliance/Party		Popular vote			Seats		
Alliance/Party		Votes	%	±pp	Contested	Won	+/−
TDP+	Telugu Desam Party	10,625,508	46.21	▼0.09	250	202	▲1
TDP+	Communist Party of India	617,731	2.69	▼0.10	15	11	▲7
TDP+	Communist Party of India (Marxist)	530,349	2.31	▲0.30	12	11	▲6
TDP+	Bharatiya Janata Party	372,978	1.62	▼1.14	10	8	▲5
TDP+	Total	12,146,566	52.83	N/A	287	232	N/A
Indian National Congress		8,566,891	37.25	▲3.67	290	50	▼10
Other parties		189,243	0.82	N/A	20	3	N/A
Independents		2,092,637	9.10	▼0.81	1,375	9	▼10
Total		22,995,337	100.00	N/A	1,972	294	N/A
Vote statistics
Valid votes		22,995,337	98.39				
Invalid votes		375,413	1.61				
Votes cast/ turnout		23,370,750	67.57				
Abstentions		11,216,622	32.43				
Registered voters		34,587,372					

=== Results by district ===
District	Seats						
District	Seats	TDP	INC	CPI	CPM	BJP	OTH
Srikakulam	12	10	2	—N/a	—N/a	—N/a	—N/a
Vizianagaram	12	9	3	—N/a	—N/a	—N/a	—N/a
Visakhapatnam	13	13	—N/a	—N/a	—N/a	—N/a	—N/a
East Godavari	21	20	1	—N/a	—N/a	—N/a	—N/a
West Godavari	16	15	—N/a	—N/a	1	—N/a	—N/a
Krishna	17	12	3	1	1	—N/a	—N/a
Guntur	19	12	5	1	1	—N/a	—N/a
Prakasam	13	10	3	—N/a	—N/a	—N/a	—N/a
Nellore	11	6	4	—N/a	1	—N/a	—N/a
Chittoor	15	10	5	—N/a	—N/a	—N/a	—N/a
Kadapa	11	8	3	—N/a	—N/a	—N/a	—N/a
Anantapur	14	11	2	1	—N/a	—N/a	—N/a
Kurnool	13	8	5	—N/a	—N/a	—N/a	—N/a
Mahbubnagar	13	9	2	—N/a	—N/a	1	1
Ranga Reddy	6	5	1	—N/a	—N/a	—N/a	—N/a
Hyderabad	13	4	1	—N/a	—N/a	3	5
Medak	10	5	3	1	—N/a	1	—N/a
Nizamabad	9	9	—N/a	—N/a	—N/a	—N/a	—N/a
Adilabad	9	5	1	1	—N/a	—N/a	2
Karimnagar	13	8	1	2	—N/a	1	1
Warangal	13	6	3	—N/a	1	2	1
Khammam	9	2	1	1	5	—N/a	1
Nalgonda	12	6	1	3	2	—N/a	—N/a
Total	294	202	50	11	11	8	11

=== Results by constituency ===
District	Constituency		Winner			Runner Up			Margin	
District	No.	Name	Candidate	Party	Votes	Candidate	Party	Votes	Margin	
Srikakulam	1	Ichchapuram	M.V.Krishna Rao	TDP	47,333	Labala Sundara Rao	INC	11,965	Margin	32,695
Srikakulam	2	Sompeta	Gouthu Syama Sunder Sivaji	TDP	45,074	Majji Narayanarao	INC	26,494	18,580	
Srikakulam	3	Tekkali	Varada Saroja	TDP	66,200	Duvvada Venkata Ramarao	INC	42,487	21,571	
Srikakulam	4	Harishchandrapuram	Yerrannaidu Kinjarapu	TDP	46,572	Raghavarao Sampathirao	INC	28,433	18,139	
Srikakulam	5	Narasannapeta	Simma Prabhakara Rao	TDP	37,653	Dharmana Prasada Rao	INC	35,491	2,162	
Srikakulam	6	Pathapatnam	Dharmana Narayana Rao	INC	38,408	Mathala Lokhanadham	TDP	32,834	5,574	
Srikakulam	7	Kothuru (ST)	Viswasarai Narasimha Rao	INC	33,803	Nimmaka Gopala Rao	TDP	33,440	363	
Vizianagaram	8	Naguru (ST)	Satrucharla Vijaya Rama Raju	INC	31,872	Vempatapu Bharati	TDP	27,958	3,914	
Vizianagaram	9	Parvathipuram	Mariserla Venkata Rami Naidu	TDP	39,826	Doddi Parasuram	INC	23,824	16,002	
Vizianagaram	10	Salur (ST)	Boina Rajayya	TDP	33,348	L.N. Sanyasi Raju	INC	25,712	7,636	
Vizianagaram	11	Bobbili	Sambangi Venkata China Appala Naidu	TDP	44,875	Inuganti Venkataramana Murty	INC	15,427	29,448	
Vizianagaram	12	Therlam	Thentu Jayaprakash	TDP	44,330	Vasireddi Varada Rama Rao	INC	28,197	16,133	
Srikakulam	13	Vunukuru	Kimidi Kalavenkata Rao	TDP	49,843	Palavalasa Rajasekharam	INC	22,498	27,345	
Srikakulam	14	Palakonda (SC)	Tale Bhyadrayya	TDP	37,858	Amruthakumari P.J	INC	14,954	22,904	
Srikakulam	15	Amadalavalasa	Thammineni Seetharam	TDP	34,697	Pydi Srirama Murty	INC	32,568	2,129	
Srikakulam	16	Srikakulam	Gunda Appala Suryanarayana	TDP	51,925	Mylapilli Narsayya	INC	12,968	38,957	
Srikakulam	17	Etcherla (SC)	K. Pratibha Bharati	TDP	43,191	Chappidi Vijayalaxmi Parameswara Rao	INC	16,244	26,947	
Vizianagaram	18	Cheepurupalli	Kemburi Rama Mohan Rao	TDP	45,349	Meesala Neelakantham	Independent	13,052	32,297	
Vizianagaram	19	Gajapathinagaram	Vangapandu Narayanappalanaidu	INC	38,119	Jampana Satyanarayana Raju	TDP	36,260	1,859	
Vizianagaram	20	Vizianagaram	Ashok Gajapathi Raju	TDP	49,963	Modili Srinivasa Rao	INC	11,994	37,969	
Vizianagaram	21	Sathivada	Penumatcha Samba Siva Raju	INC	46,444	Baireddi Surya Narayana	TDP	34,744	11,700	
Vizianagaram	22	Bhogapuram	Pathivada Narayanaswamy Naidu	TDP	36,901	Kommuru Appala Swamy	INC	31,994	4,907	
Visakhapatnam	23	Bheemunipatnam	Rajasagi Devi Prasanna Appala Narasimha Raju	TDP	49,552	Akella Seshagiri Rao	INC	15,406	34,146	
Visakhapatnam	24	Visakhapatnam-I	Allu Bhanumathi	TDP	35,344	Paluri Seshumamba	INC	23,705	9,038	
Visakhapatnam	25	Visakhapatnam-II	Rajana Ramani	TDP	60,387	Yandrapu Mariadas	INC	48,492	11,895	
Visakhapatnam	26	Pendurthi	Alla Rama Chandra Rao	TDP	56,498	Gudivada Gurunadharao	INC	47,289	9,209	
Vizianagaram	27	Uttarapalli	Kolla Appalanaidu	TDP	45,964	Thurpati Krishnaswamynaidu	INC	19,888	26,076	
Vizianagaram	28	Srungavarapukota (ST)	Dukku Labudu Bariki	TDP	57,369	Setti Ganghadhara Swamy	INC	38,289	19,080	
Visakhapatnam	29	Paderu (ST)	Kottagulli Chitti Naidu	TDP	11,342	Matsyarasa Balaraju	INC	11,229	113	
Visakhapatnam	30	Madugula	Reddi Satyanarayana	TDP	46,104	Kuracha Ramunaidu	INC	17,683	28,421	
Visakhapatnam	31	Chodavaram	Gunuru Yerrunaidu	TDP	48,946	Gorle Kannam Naidu	INC	31,204	17,742	
Visakhapatnam	32	Anakapalli	Dadi Veerabhadra Rao	TDP	51,083	Nimmadala Satyanarayana	INC	21,542	29,541	
Visakhapatnam	33	Paravada	Paila Appalanaidu	TDP	53,029	K.S.Adinarayana Ramayya Naidu	INC	19,803	33,226	
Visakhapatnam	34	Elamanchili	Pappala Chalapathi Rao	TDP	44,597	Vesam Sanyasi Naidu	INC	34,677	9,920	
Visakhapatnam	35	Payakaraopet (SC)	Kakara Nookaraju	TDP	42,821	G. V. Harsha Kumar	INC	13,053	29,768	
Visakhapatnam	36	Narsipatnam	Chintakayala Ayyanna Patrudu	TDP	43,218	Veehalapu Sri Rama Murty	INC	42,407	811	
Visakhapatnam	37	Chintapalle (ST)	Mottadam Veera Venkata Satyanarayana	TDP	31,974	Kankipati Veerabhadrarao	INC	17,536	14,438	
East Godavari	38	Yellavaram (ST)	Seethamsety Venkateswara Rao	TDP	42,468	Ratnabhai Tadapatla	INC	22,877	19,591	
East Godavari	39	Burugupudi	Ghinnam Jogarao	TDP	23,326	Gorrela Prakasarao	INC	13,636	9,690	
East Godavari	40	Rajahmundry	Gorantla Butchaiah Chowdary	TDP	47,404	A. C. Y. Reddy	INC	40,165	7,239	
East Godavari	41	Kadiam	Vaddi Veerabhadra Rao	TDP	65,591	Chikkala Unamaheswar	INC	28,421	37,170	
East Godavari	42	Jaggampeta	Thota Subrarao	TDP	52,756	Panthan Suri Babu	INC	20,408	32,348	
East Godavari	43	Peddapuram	Balusu Ramarao	TDP	45,647	Durvasula Satyanarayanamurty	INC	25,272	20,375	
East Godavari	44	Prathipadu (East Godavari)	Mudragada Padmanabham	TDP	54,354	Sampara Sundara Rama Kumar	INC	13,025	41,329	
East Godavari	45	Tuni	Yanamala Rama Krishnudu	TDP	50,292	M. N. Vijayalakshmi Devi	INC	33,988	16,304	
East Godavari	46	Pithapuram	Venna Nageswararao	TDP	40,375	Sangisetti Veerabhadra Rao	INC	25,986	14,389	
East Godavari	47	Sampara	Tirumani Satyalinga Naicker	TDP	52,452	Yerubandi Bhulokarayudu	INC	23,782	28,670	
East Godavari	48	Kakinada	Mootha Gopala Krishna	TDP	49,180	Pothula Seetharamaiah	INC	27,084	22,096	
East Godavari	49	Tallarevu	Chikkala Ramachandra Rao	TDP	49,422	Dommeti Venkateswarlu	INC	26,104	23,318	
East Godavari	50	Anaparthy	Nallamilli Moola Reddy	TDP	43,552	Tadala Ammi Reddy	INC	35,831	7,721	
East Godavari	51	Ramachandrapuram	Medisetti Vera Venka Rama Rao	TDP	41,978	Pilli Subhas Chandhra Bose	INC	23,836	18,142	
East Godavari	52	Alamuru	Valluri Narayanmurthy	TDP	54,816	Suryabhaskararao	INC	34,445	20,371	
East Godavari	53	Mummidivaram (SC)	Pandu Krishna Murty	TDP	46,779	Kurm Vara Prasad Geddam	INC	13,655	33,124	
East Godavari	54	Allavaram (SC)	Gollapalli Surya Rao	TDP	28,358	Yelamanchill Satyanarayana	INC	24,829	3,529	
East Godavari	55	Amalapuram	Kudupudi Prabhakara Rao	INC	41,296	Ravanam Ramachandra Rao	TDP	33,826	7,470	
East Godavari	56	Kothapeta	I. S. Raju	TDP	30,563	Chirla Soma Sundara Reddi	Independent	29,166	1,397	
East Godavari	57	Nagaram (SC)	Undru Krishna Rao	TDP	45,126	Geddam Rama Rao	INC	21,343	23,783	
East Godavari	58	Razole	Alluri Venkata Surya Narayana Raju	TDP	47,230	Ponnada Hanumantha Rao	INC	24,167	23,063	
West Godavari	59	Narasapuram	Chegondi Harirama Jogaiah	TDP	61,405	Melam Suryanarayana (Shavukau)	INC	28,358	33,047	
West Godavari	60	Palacole	Allu Venkata Satyanarayana	TDP	47,044	Vardhinetdia	INC	26,470	20,574	
West Godavari	61	Achanta (SC)	Alugu Chittaranjan	CPI(M)	53,510	Kamidi Ambuja	INC	19,294	31,722	
West Godavari	62	Bhimavaram	Penmetsa Venkata Narasimha Raju	TDP	58,020	Ramesh Naidu	INC	25,205	32,815	
West Godavari	63	Undi	Kalidindi Ramachandra Raju	TDP	53,216	Katari Prabhakara Rao	INC	24,083	29,133	
West Godavari	64	Penugonda	Prathi Manemma	TDP	45,972	Pilli Sathiraju	INC	18,912	27,060	
West Godavari	65	Tanuku	Mullapudi Venkata Krishnarao	TDP	57,184	Karuturi Anantha Ramamurty	INC	25,285	31,899	
West Godavari	66	Attili	Vegesna Kanaka Durga Venkata Satyanarayanaraju	TDP	52,909	Kanetek Satyanarayanaraju	INC	26,065	26,844	
West Godavari	67	Tadepalligudem	Yerra Narayana Swamy (Benarji)	TDP	49,900	Eli Veralakshmi	INC	29,025	20,875	
West Godavari	68	Ungutur	Katamani Srinivasarao	TDP	56,934	Daskka Lakshmana Sastry	INC	27,415	29,519	
West Godavari	69	Dendulur	Garapati Sambasiva Rao	TDP	46,868	Seelu Mary Paul Padmavathi Devi	INC	28,697	18,171	
West Godavari	70	Eluru	Maradani Rangarao	TDP	52,078	Nandi Bala Satyanarayana	INC	32,038	20,040	
West Godavari	71	Gopalpuram (SC)	Vivekananda Karupati	TDP	50,444	Namburi Jhansi Rani	INC	25,576	24,868	
West Godavari	72	Kovvur	Pendyala Venkata Krishna Rao	TDP	61,899	Immanni Seshagiri Rao	INC	29,116	32,783	
West Godavari	73	Polavaram (ST)	Modium Lakshmana Rao	TDP	40,723	Rasaputhra Lakshminaryana	INC	24,595	16,128	
West Godavari	74	Chintalapudi	Kotagiri Vidyadhara Rao	TDP	52,068	Mandalapu Satyanarayana	INC	40,993	11,075	
Krishna	75	Jaggayyapet	Nettem Raghuram	TDP	44,613	Mukkapati Venkateswara Rao	INC	38,384	6,229	
Krishna	76	Nandigama	Vasanta Nageswara Rao	TDP	45,206	Sree Gopala Krishna Sai Babbellapati	INC	43,268	1,938	
Krishna	77	Vijayawada West	Uppalapati Ramachandra Raju	CPI	51,249	M.K.Baig	INC	43,948	7,301	
Krishna	78	Vijayawada East	Vangaveeti Mohana Ranga	INC	45,575	Yarlagadda Rajagopala Rao	TDP	42,445	3,130	
Krishna	79	Kankipadu	Devineni Nehru	TDP	60,587	Pilla Venkateswara Rao	INC	47,661	12,926	
Krishna	80	Mylavaram	Chanamolu Venkata Rao	INC	51,432	Nimmagadda Satyanarayana	TDP	42,064	9,368	
Krishna	81	Tiruvuru (SC)	Pitta Venkataratnam	TDP	46,374	Modugu Raghavulu	Independent	34,421	11,953	
Krishna	82	Nuzvid	Kotagiri Hanumantha Rao	TDP	50,282	Paladugu Venkata Rao	INC	46,688	3,594	
Krishna	83	Gannavaram	Mulpuru Balakrishna Rao	TDP	40,641	Kolusu Pedda Rattaiah	INC	35,072	5,569	
Krishna	84	Vuyyur	Anne Babu Rao	TDP	41,817	Muvva Sabba Reddy	INC	34,069	7,748	
Krishna	85	Gudivada	Nandamuri Taraka Rama Rao	TDP	49,600	Uppalapati Suryanarayana Babu	INC	42,003	7,597	
Krishna	86	Mudinepalli	Yerneni Sita Devi	TDP	45,143	Koneru Ranga Rao	INC	35,245	9,898	
Krishna	87	Kaikalur	Kanumuri Bapi Raju	INC	43,136	Peddireddi Adinarayana Murthy	TDP	37,853	5,283	
Krishna	88	Malleswaram	Kagita Venkata Rao	TDP	38,518	Buragadda Niranjana Rao	INC	37,289	1,229	
Krishna	89	Bandar	Vaddi Ranga Rao	TDP	46,122	Tirumani Mangathayaru	INC	35,410	10,712	
Krishna	90	Nidumolu (SC)	Paturu Ramaiah	CPI(M)	36,934	Vinaya Babu Munipalli	Independent	30,008	6,926	
Krishna	91	Avanigadda	Simhadri Satyanarayana Rao	TDP	36,165	Mandali Venkata Krishna Rao	INC	29,932	6,233	
Guntur	92	Kuchinapudi	Evuru Seetharamma	TDP	31,352	Dasari Venkaiah	INC	22,208	9,144	
Guntur	93	Repalle	Yadla Venkata Rao	TDP	32,658	Kantamneni Rajendra Prasad	INC	21,832	10,826	
Guntur	94	Vemuru	Kidali Veraiah	TDP	43,098	P.L.V.Prasada Rao	INC	34,982	8,116	
Guntur	95	Duggirala	Alapati Dharma Rao	INC	43,617	Bandaru Issac Prabhakar	TDP	32,320	11,297	
Guntur	96	Tenali	Annabathuni Sathyanarayana	TDP	43,332	Doddapaneni Indira	INC	38,743	4,589	
Guntur	97	Ponnur	Dhulipalla Veeraiah Chowdary	TDP	43,714	Chittineni	INC	37,303	6,411	
Guntur	98	Bapatla	Ummareddy Venkateswarlu	TDP	37,129	Manthena Venkata Suryanarayana Raju	Independent	19,102	18,027	
Guntur	99	Prathipadu (Guntur)	Makineni Peda Rathaiah	TDP	42,004	Chukka Peter Paul	INC	31,214	10,790	
Guntur	100	Guntur-I	Mohammed Jani	INC	46,196	Shaik Syed Saheb	TDP	43,765	2,431	
Guntur	101	Guntur-II	Jayarambabu Chadalavada	INC	36,713	Gade Durga Prasunamba	TDP	35,448	1,265	
Guntur	102	Mangalagiri	M.S.S.Koteswara Rao	TDP	43,584	Jamuna	INC	39,915	3,669	
Guntur	103	Tadikonda (SC)	J. R. Pushparaj	TDP	40,589	Kuchipudi Sambasivarao	INC	37,935	2,654	
Guntur	104	Sattenapalli	Pathumbaka Venkatapathi	CPI(M)	49,521	J. U. Padmalatha	INC	40,170	9,351	
Guntur	105	Peddakurapadu	Kasaraneni Sadasiva Rao	TDP	49,051	Mahaboob Syed	INC	41,222	7,829	
Guntur	106	Gurzala	Mutyam Anki Reddy	TDP	46,111	Kayiti Venkata Narisi Reddy	INC	42,508	3,603	
Guntur	107	Macherla	Nattuva Krishnamurthy	INC	40,822	Vattikonda Jayaramaiah	TDP	39,118	1,704	
Guntur	108	Vinukonda	Ganginent Venkateswara Rao	CPI	46,994	Chandra Venkata Narayana Rao	INC	35,118	11,876	
Guntur	109	Narasaraopet	Kodela Siva Prasada Rao	TDP	53,517	Kasu Venkata Krishna Reddy	INC	51,453	2,064	
Guntur	110	Chilakaluripet	Somepalli Sambaiah	INC	49,397	Manam Venkateswarlu	TDP	44,519	4,878	
Prakasam	111	Chirala	Sajja Chandramouli	TDP	44,156	Ande Narasimharao	INC	35,384	8,772	
Prakasam	112	Parchur	Daggubati Venkateswara Rao	TDP	43,905	Gade Venkata Reddy	INC	42,828	1,077	
Prakasam	113	Martur	Karanam Balaram Krishna Murthy	TDP	51,138	Kandimalla Subbarao	INC	33,763	13,298	
Prakasam	114	Addanki	Chenchu Garataiah Bachina	TDP	47,813	Jagarlamudi Hanumaiah	INC	42,253	5,560	
Prakasam	115	Ongole	Ponugupati Koteswara Rao	TDP	53,654	Pasupuleti Malakondaiah Naidu	INC	44,630	9,024	
Prakasam	116	Santhanuthalapadu (SC)	Adenna Kasukurtmy	TDP	48,115	Chinthapalli Poulu	INC	40,008	8,107	
Prakasam	117	Kandukur	Manugunta Audinarayana Reddy	INC	45,765	Gutta Venkatasubbaiah	TDP	44,480	1,285	
Prakasam	118	Kanigiri	Mukku Kasi Reddy	TDP	31,286	Erigineni Thirupathi Naidu	Independent	29,696	1,590	
Prakasam	119	Kondepi	Achyutakumar Gundapaneni	INC	38,404	Moruboina Malakondaiah	TDP	37,133	1,271	
Prakasam	120	Cumbum	Vudumula Venkata Reddy	TDP	39,089	Kandula Nagarjuna Reddy	INC	36,093	2,996	
Prakasam	121	Darsi	Pusetty Sriramulu	TDP	42,471	Ikommu Pitchireddy	INC	42,193	278	
Prakasam	122	Markapur	Kunduru Pedda Konda Reddy	INC	41,333	Poola Subbiah	CPI	34,326	7,007	
Prakasam	123	Giddalur	Pidathala Ranga Reddy	TDP	40,577	Mudiam Peera Reddy	INC	24,315	16,262	
Nellore	124	Udayagiri	Mekapati Rajamohan Reddy	INC	34,464	Kambham Vijayarami Reddy	Independent	18,951	15,513	
Nellore	125	Kavali	Kaliki Yanadi Reddy	INC	46,286	Muvvala Venkata Narayana	TDP	36,453	9,833	
Nellore	126	Allur	Jakka Venkaiah	CPI(M)	37,382	Bezavada Dasradharami Reddy	Independent	18,866	18,516	
Nellore	127	Kovur	Srinivasulu Reddy Nallapareddy	TDP	46,503	Chevuru Deva Kumar Reddy	INC	29,426	17,077	
Nellore	128	Atmakur (Nellore)	Dr.Bommireddy Sundararamireddy	INC	46,105	Muppavarapu Venkaiah Naidu	BJP	45,275	830	
Nellore	129	Rapur	Anam Ramanarayana Reddy	TDP	39,427	Nuvvula Venkatarantnam Naidu	INC	34,515	4,912	
Nellore	130	Nellore	Kunam Venkata Subba Reddy	INC	47,074	Tallapaka Rakesh Reddy	TDP	44,086	2,988	
Nellore	131	Sarvepalli	Eduru Ramakrishna Reddy	TDP	50,423	Kotamreddy Vijaya Kumarreddy	INC	28,857	21,566	
Nellore	132	Gudur (SC)	Balli Durga Prasad Rao	TDP	55,135	Mungara Ramanaiah	INC	32,911	22,224	
Nellore	133	Sulurpet (SC)	Madanambeti Maneiah	TDP	50,337	Pitla Venkatasubbaiah	INC	22,578	27,759	
Nellore	134	Venkatagiri	Yachendra V. Bhaskara Saikrishna	TDP	55,240	Petluru Balakrishna Reddy	INC	26,418	28,822	
Chittoor	135	Srikalahasti	Satravada Muniramaiah	TDP	46,721	Tatiparthi Chenchu Reddy	INC	46,641	80	
Chittoor	136	Satyavedu (SC)	Emsurajan	TDP	47,237	Yenduri Babu Rao	INC	33,327	13,910	
Chittoor	137	Nagari	Reddyvari Chenga Reddy	INC;	50,646	A. M. Radhakrishna	TDP	49,504	1,142	
Chittoor	138	Puttur	Gali Muddukrishnama Naidu	TDP	49,908	Reddivari Rajasekhar Reddy	INC	32,707	17,201	
Chittoor	139	Vepanjeri (SC)	Gummadi Kuthuhalamma	INC	42,534	B. Ramana	TDP	36,827	5,707	
Chittoor	140	Chittoor	R. Gopinathan	INC	45,081	Rajasimhulu	TDP	36,439	8,642	
Chittoor	141	Palmaner (SC)	Patnam Subbaiah	TDP	43,895	N. Shanmugam	INC	18,790	25,105	
Chittoor	142	Kuppam	N. Rangaswami Naidu	TDP	46,548	Dr. S. Krishna	INC	9,584	36,964	
Chittoor	143	Punganur	Nuthanakalva Ramakrishna Reddy	TDP	46,604	K. Padmavathamma	INC	24,389	22,215	
Chittoor	144	Madanpalle	Ratakonda Narayana Reddy	TDP	39,774	Alluri Subramanyam	INC	31,684	8,090	
Chittoor	145	Thamballapalle	Anipireddi Venkatalakshmi Devamma	TDP	34,332	T. N. Sresbuvasa Reddy	INC	32,161	2,171	
Chittoor	146	Vayalpad	Nallari Amaranatha Reddy	INC	46,122	G. V. Sreenatha Reddy	TDP	34,640	11,482	
Chittoor	147	Pileru	Challa Prabhakara Reddy	TDP	42,187	Peddireddy Ramachandra Reddy	INC	37,938	4,249	
Chittoor	148	Chandragiri	N.R.Jayadeva Naidu	TDP	44,155	P.Balasubramanyam Chowdary	INC	42,475	1,680	
Chittoor	149	Tirupathi	Mabbu Rami Reddy	INC	45,510	Pandraveti Guruva Reddy	TDP	42,643	2,867	
Kadapa	150	Kodur (SC)	Thoomati Penchalaiah	TDP	40,311	Nediganti Venkatasubbaiah	INC	24,806	15,504	
Kadapa	151	Rajampet	Bandaru Ratnasabhapathi	TDP	46,568	Kasireddi Madan Mohan Reddy	INC	41,234	5,334	
Kadapa	152	Rayachoti	Mandipalli Nagi Reddy	INC	50,848	Shaik Dade Sabeb	TDP	34,527	16,321	
Kadapa	153	Lakkireddipalli	Reddappagari Rajagopal Reddy	TDP	52,937	K.P.Subbareddy	INC	20,762	32,175	
Kadapa	154	Cuddapa	C. Ramachandraiah	TDP	46,271	M. Chandrasekhara Reddy	INC	38,074	8,197	
Kadapa	155	Badvel	B. Veera Reddy	TDP	50,034	V. Sivarama Krishna Rao	INC	40,768	9,266	
Kadapa	156	Mydukur	Settipalle Raghurami Reddy	TDP	43,857	D. L. Ravindra Reddy	INC	40,162	3,695	
Kadapa	157	Proddatur	Nandyala Varada Rajulu Reddy	TDP	45,738	M.V.Ramana Reddy	Independent	40,153	7,130	
Kadapa	158	Jammalamadugu	Ponnapureddy Siva Reddy	TDP	71,158	Kunda Pedda Chowdappa	Independent	13,988	57,170	
Kadapa	159	Kamalapuram	Mule Venkata Mysura Reddy	INC	57,495	Ranuva Seetharamaiah	TDP	26,255	31,240	
Kadapa	160	Pulivendla	Y. S. Rajasekhar Reddy	INC	61,048	Devireddy Sadasiva Reddy	TDP	30,206	30,842	
Anantapur	161	Kadiri	Chennur Abdul Rasool	TDP	35,398	Bachineni Vengamuni Chowdary	INC	24,470	10,928	
Anantapur	162	Nallamada	Saddapalli Venkata Reddy	TDP	39,501	Agisam Veerappa	INC	24,540	14,961	
Anantapur	163	Gorantla	Kesanna Veluri	TDP	45,677	M. Raghunatha Reddy	INC	15,113	30,564	
Anantapur	164	Hindupur	N. T. Rama Rao	TDP	56,599	E. Adimurty	INC	16,070	40,529	
Anantapur	165	Madakasira	H.B.Narase Gowd	TDP	51,220	Y.T. Prabhakara Reddy	INC	26,900	24,320	
Anantapur	166	Penukonda	S. Ramachandra Reddy	TDP	43,449	G.Veeranna	INC	35,933	7,516	
Anantapur	167	Kalyandrug (SC)	Pakkeerappa	CPI	49,489	M. Lakshmidevi	INC	24,469	25,020	
Anantapur	168	Rayadrug	Huli Kuntaprao	INC	41,777	U.Lingareddy	JP	34,588	7,189	
Anantapur	169	Uravakonda	Gurram Narayanappa	TDP	38,390	V.Gopinath	INC	29,014	9,376	
Anantapur	170	Gooty	Gadhi Lingappa	TDP	35,090	Jagadeesh	INC	27,623	7,467	
Anantapur	171	Singanamala (SC)	K. Jayaram	TDP	34,202	S. Sairam	INC	19,990	14,212	
Anantapur	172	Anantapur	N. Ramakrishna	TDP	43,715	A. Narayana Reddy	INC	36,294	7,421	
Anantapur	173	Dhamavaram	Garudammagari Nagireddy	TDP	46,651	G. Pedda Reddy	INC	34,580	12,071	
Anantapur	174	Tadpatri	J. C. Diwakar Reddy	INC	49,747	Bhunireddygari Ramachandra Reddy	TDP	38,263	11,484	
Kurnool	175	Alur (SC)	Eranna Masala	INC	28,773	Moolinti Mareppa	TDP	25,395	3,378	
Kurnool	176	Adoni	Raichooti Ramaiah	INC	44,886	Panduranga Rao	TDP	34,833	10,053	
Kurnool	177	Yemmiganur	B. V. Mohan Reddy	TDP	53,889	Devendra Gowd	INC	24,985	28,904	
Kurnool	178	Kodumur (SC)	M. Sikhamani	TDP	39,256	Damodaram Munuswamy	INC	32,821	6,435	
Kurnool	179	Kurnool	V. Ram Bhupa Chowdary	INC	43,699	K.Nagi Reddy	TDP	37,880	5,819	
Kurnool	180	Pattikonda	Guppa Mahabaleswara Gupta	TDP	35,441	Patil Ramakrishna Reddy	INC	31,927	3,514	
Kurnool	181	Dhone	K.E.Krishna Murthy	TDP	41,893	K.Kodanda Rami Reddy	INC	30,037	11,856	
Kurnool	182	Koilkuntla	Karra Subba Reddy	TDP	43,907	B.Ramaswamy Reddy	INC	32,420	11,487	
Kurnool	183	Allagadda	Gangula Prathapa Reddy	INC	45,625	Bhuma Sekhar Reddy	TDP	44,320	1,305	
Kurnool	184	Panyam	Katasani Rama Bhupal Reddy	INC	38,712	Bijjam Satyanarayana Reddy	TDP	34,653	4,059	
Kurnool	185	Nandikotkur	Ippala Thimmareddy	TDP	47,457	Byreddy Seshasayanareddy	INC	45,385	2,072	
Kurnool	186	Nandyal	N. Md. Farooq	TDP	45,658	G. Parthasaradi Reddy	INC	37,211	8,447	
Kurnool	187	Atmakur (Kurnool)	Budda Vengala Reddy	TDP	43,135	Gurrappagari Nagalkshmi Reddy	INC	36,000	7,135	
Mahabubnagar	188	Achampet (SC)	P.Mahendranath	TDP	50,680	Jayanthi	INC	16,235	34,445	
Mahabubnagar	189	Nagarkurnool	Nagam Janardhan Reddy	TDP	38,786	Vanga Mohan Goud	INC	24,119	14,667	
Mahabubnagar	190	Kalwakurthy	J.Chittaranjan Das	INC	37,192	Dyapa Lingareddy	JP	27,754	9,438	
Mahabubnagar	191	Shadnagar (SC)	M. Indira	TDP	37,889	B. Kistaiah	INC	30,871	7,018	
Mahabubnagar	192	Jadcherla	M. Krishna Reddy	TDP	38,045	N Narasappa	INC	23,840	14,205	
Mahabubnagar	193	Mahbubnagar	Chandra Sekhar	TDP	44,364	G.Sahadev	INC	30,915	13,449	
Mahabubnagar	194	Wanaparthy	Dr.A.Balakrishnaiah	TDP	43,401	G. Chinna Reddy	INC	31,943	11,458	
Mahabubnagar	195	Kollapur	Kotha Venkateswer Rao	INC	41,222	Suravaram Sudhakar Reddy	CPI	38,723	2,499	
Mahabubnagar	196	Alampur	Ravula Ravindranath Reddy	BJP	37,910	B.Anasuyamma	INC	25,709	12,201	
Mahabubnagar	197	Gadwal	N. Gopala Reddy	TDP	38,311	D.K. Samarasimha Reddy	INC	38,217	94	
Mahabubnagar	198	Amarchinta	Rafique Mehdi Khan	TDP	45,259	K. Veera Reddy	INC	32,220	13,039	
Mahabubnagar	199	Makthal	Chittem Narsi Reddy	JP	45,606	G. Narsimulu Naidu	INC	19,632	25,974	
Mahabubnagar	200	Kodangal	Nandaram Venkataiah	TDP	42,531	Gurunath Reddy	INC	31,917	10,614	
Ranga Reddy	201	Tandur	M.Chandra Sekhar	INC	42,708	Sirigiripeta Balappa	TDP	28,505	14,203	
Ranga Reddy	202	Vicarabad (SC)	A. Chandrasekhar	TDP	38,465	Devadas	Independent	18,104	20,361	
Ranga Reddy	203	Pargi	Koppula Harishwar Reddy	TDP	53,920	Ahmed Shareef	INC	21,408	32,512	
Ranga Reddy	204	Chevella	P. Indra Reddy	TDP	64,518	K.Vikram Kumar Reddy	INC	24,713	39,805	
Ranga Reddy	205	Ibrahimpatnam (SC)	K.Satyanarayana	TDP	52,191	M.B.Satyanaryana	INC	22,129	30,062	
Hyderabad	206	Musheerabad	Nayani Narasimha Reddy	JP	38,361	K.Prakash Goud	INC	27,377	10,984	
Hyderabad	207	Himayatnagar	Ale Narendra	BJP	38,941	K.Prabhakar Reddy	INC	18,588	20,353	
Hyderabad	208	Sanathnagar	Sripathi Rajeshwar Rao	TDP	32,513	P.L.Srinivas	INC	23,504	9,009	
Hyderabad	209	Secunderabad	Alladi P. Raj Kumar	TDP	41,241	Gouri Shanker	INC	21,444	19,797	
Hyderabad	210	Khairatabad	P. Janardhana Reddy	INC	46,172	N. Mohan Reddy	TDP	40,327	5,845	
Hyderabad	211	Secunderabad Cantt. (SC)	Sarve Satyanarayana	TDP	35,427	D.B.Devender Rao	INC	28,521	6,906	
Hyderabad	212	Malakpet	N. Indrasena Reddy	BJP	57,581	Nandendla Bhaskara Reddy	INC	39,790	17,791	
Hyderabad	213	Asifnagar	Mohammed Virasat Rasool Khan	Independent	34,646	M.Sridhar Reddy	TDP	22,313	12,333	
Hyderabad	214	Maharajgunj	G.Narayan Rao	TDP	24,584	Lalita Rao Yadav	INC	14,152	10,432	
Hyderabad	215	Karwan	Baddam Bal Reddy	BJP	46,597	Mohd. Virasat Rasool Khan	Independent	36,820	9,777	
Hyderabad	216	Yakutpura	Ibrahim Bin Abdullah Masqati	Independent	62,125	Mohammad Zaidi	TDP	12,410	49,715	
Hyderabad	217	Chandrayangutta	Md. Amanullah Khan	Independent	57,034	G.Krishna	Independent	54,025	3,009	
Hyderabad	218	Charminar	Mohd.Mukkarramuddin	Independent	62,676	Jagat Singh	Independent	17,024	45,652	
Ranga Reddy	219	Medchal	Kommareddy Surender Reddy	TDP	57,679	G.Sanjeeva Reddy	INC	32,686	24,993	
Medak	220	Siddipet	K. Chandra Shakher Rao	TDP	45,215	T.Mahender Reddy	INC	29,059	27,107	
Medak	221	Dommat	D.Ramchandra Reddy	TDP	44,321	K.Sitaram Reddy	INC	23,360	20,961	
Medak	222	Gajwel (SC)	B.Sanjeeva Rao	TDP	43,874	Gajwel Saidhulu	INC	36,492	7,382	
Medak	223	Narsapur	Chilumula Vittal Reddy	CPI	50,395	Chavoti Jagannathrao	INC	33,110	17,285	
Medak	224	Sangareddy	P. Ramachandra Reddy	INC	37,585	K.Sadasiva Reddy	Independent	31,266	6,319	
Medak	225	Zahirabad	Mogaligundla Baga Reddy	INC	39,155	R.Dasharathareddy	TDP	34,204	4,951	
Medak	226	Narayankhed	Shivarao Shetkar	INC	45,455	M.Venkat Reddy	TDP	40,999	4,456	
Medak	227	Medak	Karanam Ramachandra Rao	TDP	45,320	M. N Laxminarayan	INC	24,510	20,810	
Medak	228	Ramayampet	Ramannagari Srinivasareddy	BJP	38,126	R. Muthyamreddy	INC	36,400	1,726	
Medak	229	Andole (SC)	Malyala Rajaiah	TDP	36,306	C. Raja Narsimha	Independent	19,843	16,463	
Nizamabad	230	Balkonda	G.Madhusudhan Reddy	TDP	40,779	G. Pramila Devi	INC	24,046	16,733	
Nizamabad	231	Armur	Aleti Mahipal Reddy	TDP	41,893	Sanigaram Santosh Reddy	INC	35,285	6,608	
Nizamabad	232	Kamareddy	A.Krishna Murthy	TDP	40,488	B.R.Mallesh	INC	11,977	28,511	
Nizamabad	233	Yellareddy	Yerva Srinivas Reddy	TDP	34,360	Kasala Keshava Reddy	INC	21,332	13,028	
Nizamabad	234	Jukkal (SC)	B. Pandari	TDP	38,231	S. Gangaram	INC	20,118	18,113	
Nizamabad	235	Banswada	Venkata Suryadevara	TDP	44,904	Venkatarama Reddy	INC	35,804	9,100	
Nizamabad	236	Bodhan	Basheeruddin Babu Khan	TDP	38,842	Annapareddy Hanimi Reddy	INC	36,189	2,653	
Nizamabad	237	Nizamabad	D.Satyanarayana	TDP	42,082	Taher Bin Amdan	INC	32,761	9,321	
Nizamabad	238	Dichpalli	Mandava Venkateshwara Rao	TDP	37,211	Balreddy Anthareddy	INC	29,485	7,726	
Adilabad	239	Mudhole	Armoor Hanmanth Reddy	TDP	44,438	G. Gaddenna	INC	30,029	14,409	
Adilabad	240	Nirmal	Samudrala Venugopal Chary	TDP	39,466	G.V.Narsa Reddy	INC	16,251	23,215	
Adilabad	241	Boath (ST)	Godam Rama Rao	TDP	25,539	Sidam Bheem Rao	INC	11,206	14,333	
Adilabad	242	Adilabad	C. Ramchandra Reddy	Independent	36,170	Ranginei Laxman Rao	TDP	29,785	6,385	
Adilabad	243	Khanapur (ST)	Ajmeera Govind Naik	Independent	22,014	Kotnak Bhim Rao	TDP	13,512	8,502	
Adilabad	244	Asifabad (SC)	Gunda Mallesh	CPI	27,862	Dasari Narsaiah	INC	23,814	4,048	
Adilabad	245	Luxettipet	G. V. Sudhaker Rao	INC	43,140	C Krupakar	TDP	27,921	15,219	
Adilabad	246	Sirpur	K.V. Narayana Rao	TDP	34,619	B.Janaka Prasad	INC	26,354	8,265	
Adilabad	247	Chennur (SC)	Boda Janardhan	TDP	38,757	K.Devaki Devi	INC	20,086	18,671	
Karimnagar	248	Manthani	D. Sripada Rao	INC	34,448	Bellamkonda Narsinga Rao	TDP	27,046	7,402	
Karimnagar	249	Peddapalle	Kalva Ramachandra Reddy	TDP	38,863	Geetla Mukunda Reddy	INC	34,474	4,389	
Karimnagar	250	Mydaram (SC)	Mallesham Malem	TDP	45,957	Gummadi Narsaish	INC	17,626	28,331	
Karimnagar	251	Huzurabad	Duggirala Venkatarao	TDP	54,768	J.Bhaskar Reddy	INC	17,876	36,892	
Karimnagar	252	Kamalapur	Muddasani Damodar Reddy	TDP	35,485	Madadi Ramachandra Reddy	INC	20,367	15,118	
Karimnagar	253	Indurthi	Chinna Mallaiah Deshini	CPI	41,025	Ittireddy Jaganmohan Reddy	INC	26,095	14,930	
Karimnagar	254	Karimnagar	C Anand Rao	TDP	37,717	Velichala Jagapathi Rao	INC	30,010	7,707	
Karimnagar	255	Choppadandi	Nyalakonda Ramkishan Rao	TDP	55,141	Bandari Ramaswamy	INC	13,704	41,437	
Karimnagar	256	Jagtial	G. Rajesham Goud	TDP	43,530	T. Jeevan Reddy	INC	28,408	15,122	
Karimnagar	257	Buggaram	Shikari Vishwanatham	TDP	55,736	Kadakuntla Gangaram	INC	15,844	39,892	
Karimnagar	258	Metpalli	Chennamaneni Vidyasagar Rao	BJP	14,986	Komireddi Ramulu	Independent	14,614	372	
Karimnagar	259	Sircilla	Chennamaneni Rajeshwar Rao	CPI	43,664	Rudra Shankaraiah	INC	20,101	23,563	
Karimnagar	260	Narella (SC)	Uppari Sambiah	JP	27,902	Pati Rajam	INC	24,216	3,686	
Warangal	261	Cheriyal	Nimma Raja Reddy	TDP	43,175	N. Rajalingam	INC	13,564	29,611	
Warangal	262	Jangaon	Asireddy Narasimha Reddy	CPI(M)	45,929	Ponnala Lakshmaiah	INC	23,712	22,217	
Warangal	263	Chennur	Nemarugommula Yethi Raja Rao	TDP	47,622	Kunduru Venkatrama Reddy	INC	38,858	8,764	
Warangal	264	Dornakal	Surendra Reddy	INC	44,387	Jannareddy Jitender Reddy	TDP	29,104	15,283	
Warangal	265	Mahbubabad	Jannareddy Janardhan Reddy	INC	38,690	Ravuri Peda Verrayya	TDP	31,006	7,684	
Warangal	266	Narsampet	Omkar Maddikayala	Independent	53,263	Mandva Upender Rao	INC	31,865	21,398	
Warangal	267	Waradhanapet	Vannala Sreeramulu	BJP	39,097	Errabelli Varada Rajeshwar Rao	INC	25,571	13,526	
Warangal	268	Ghanpur Station (SC)	Bojappaly Rajaiah	TDP	37,449	Banala Anandam	INC	18,236	19,213	
Warangal	269	Warangal	Bandaru Nagabhushan Rao	TDP	30,273	Abdul Khader Mohammed	INC	22,385	7,888	
Warangal	270	Hanamkonda	V Venkateswar Rao	TDP	31,263	P. V. Ranga Rao	INC	23,404	7,859	
Warangal	271	Shyampet	Madadi Narasimha Reddy	INC	24,967	Manda Allaiah	BJP	19,539	5,428	
Warangal	272	Parkal (SC)	V Jaypal	BJP	34,926	Bochu Sammaiah	INC	17,794	17,132	
Warangal	273	Mulug (ST)	Azmeera Chandulal	TDP	36,719	Porika Jagan Naik	INC	29,087	7,632	
Khammam	274	Bhadrachalam (ST)	Kunja Bojji	CPI(M)	30,337	Sode Bhadraiah	INC	23,634	6,703	
Khammam	275	Burgampahad (ST)	Chanda Lingaiah	INC	37,132	Vooke Abbaiah	CPI	34,719	2,228	
Khammam	276	Kothagudem	Koneru Nageswara Rao	TDP	45,286	Ponguleti Sudhakar Reddy	INC	35,120	10,166	
Khammam	277	Sathupalli	Thummala Nageswara Rao	TDP	49,990	Lakkeneni Joga Rao	INC	46,172	3,818	
Khammam	278	Madhira	Bodepudi Venkateswara Rao	CPI(M)	51,104	Seelam Sidda Reddy	INC	42,036	9,068	
Khammam	279	Palair (SC)	Baji Hanumanthu	CPI(M)	40,217	Sambhani Chandra Sekhar	INC	39,249	968	
Khammam	280	Khammam	Manchikanti Rama Kishan Rao	CPI(M)	38,963	Mohammad Muzaffaruddin	INC	36,198	2,765	
Khammam	281	Shujatnagar	Mohammad Rajab Ali	CPI	37,080	Ramreddy Venkatareddy	INC	32,263	4,817	
Khammam	282	Yellandu (ST)	Gummadi Narsaiah	CPI(ML)L	29,276	Payam Muthiah	CPI	23,480	5,796	
Nalgonda	283	Thungathurthi	Ramreddy Damodar Reddy	INC	45,085	Mallu Swarajyam	CPI(M)	32,990	12,095	
Nalgonda	284	Suryapet (SC)	Daida Sundaraiah	TDP	45,005	Anumulapuri Parandhamulu	INC	24,282	20,723	
Nalgonda	285	Kodad	Venepalli Chendar Rao	TDP	55,202	Chintha Chandra Reddy	INC	43,175	12,027	
Nalgonda	286	Miryalguda	Aribandi Laxminarayana	CPI(M)	62,812	G.Cheleenamma	INC	32,415	30,397	
Nalgonda	287	Chalakurthi	Kunduru Jana Reddy	TDP	59,113	Dheeravath Raghya Naik	INC	30,245	28,868	
Nalgonda	288	Nakrekal	Narra Raghava Reddy	CPI(M)	53,144	Deshaboina China Venkatramulu	INC	23,444	29,700	
Nalgonda	289	Nalgonda	N.T.Rama Rao	TDP	49,788	Mandadi Ramachandra Reddy	Independent	18,201	31,587	
Nalgonda	290	Ramannapet	Gurram Yadagiri Reddy	CPI	47,467	Tummala Surender Reddy	Independent	14,992	32,475	
Nalgonda	291	Alair (SC)	Motkupalli Narasimhulu	TDP	49,068	Chettupalli Kennedy	INC	12,922	36,146	
Nalgonda	292	Bhongir	Alimineti Madhava Reddy	TDP	59,841	Varakantham Surender Reddy	INC	25,557	34,284	
Nalgonda	293	Mungode	Vujjini Narayana Rao	CPI	44,733	Munagala Narayan Rao	INC	23,950	20,783	
Nalgonda	294	Devarakonda (ST)	Moodu Badhu Chowhan	CPI	46,525	B.Vijaya Laxmi	INC	21,404	25,121	
