= Kuchinapudi Assembly constituency =

Constituency of the Andhra Pradesh legislative assembly, India

Coordinates: 16.79°N 80.94°E

Kuchinapudi
- Former constituency No. 92 for the Andhra Pradesh Legislative Assembly

Constituency details
- Country: India
- Region: South India
- State: Andhra Pradesh
- District: Guntur
- Lok Sabha constituency: Bapatla
- Established: 1955
- Abolished: 2008
- Total electors: 114,305
- Reservation: None

Kuchinapudi Assembly constituency was a constituency of the Andhra Pradesh Legislative Assembly, India in Guntur district. It was abolished by the 2008 delimitation.

== History of the constituency ==
After the passing of the Delimitation of Parliamentary and Assembly Constituencies Act, 1952, the Kuchinapudi constituency was first created for the Andhra state Legislative Assembly in 1955. Its extent was Repalle taluk (excluding Repalle and Cherukupalli firkas). After the passing of the States Reorganisation Act, 1956, it became a part of the new Andhra Pradesh Legislative Assembly. There is no change in the extent of constituency according to the Delimitation of Parliamentary and Assembly Constituencies Act, 1962. After the passing of the Delimitation of Parliamentary and Assembly Constituencies Act, 1976, its extent was the Kuchinapudi firka (excluding any area included in Repalle municipality) and Chodayapalem, Pedamatlapudi and Dhulipudi firkas in Repalle taluk.

It was not present in the Delimitation of Parliamentary and Assembly Constituencies Order, 2008 and hence was defunct as of the 2009 Andhra Pradesh Legislative Assembly election.

== Overview ==
It was a part of Bapatla Lok Sabha constituency along with another six Andhra Pradesh Legislative Assembly segments, namely, Ponnur, Bapatla, Chirala, Parchur, Martur and Addanki.

== Members of the Legislative Assembly ==
Year	Member	Political party
1955	Angani Bhagavantha Rao	Krishikar Lok Party
1962	Evuru Subbarao	Independent
1967	Angani Bhagavantha Rao	Indian National Congress
1972	Anagani Bhagavanta Rao	Indian National Congress
1978	Evuru Subba Rao	Janata Party
1983	Mopidevi Nagabhushanam	Telugu Desam Party
1985	Seetharamamma Evuru	Telugu Desam Party
1989	Seetharamamma Evuru	Telugu Desam Party
1994	Seetharamamma Evuru	Telugu Desam Party
1999	Mopidevi Venkata Ramana Rao	Indian National Congress
2004	Mopidevi Venkata Ramana Rao	Indian National Congress

== Election results ==
=== 2004 ===
2004 Andhra Pradesh Legislative Assembly election: Kuchinapudi
Party	Candidate	Votes	%	±%
INC	Mopidevi Venkata Ramana Rao	46,311	53.44	
TDP	Kesana Sankara Rao	37,770	43.58	
BSP	Jangam Samelu	1,884	2.17	
Majority		8,541	9.86	
Turnout		86,665	75.81	
Registered electors		1,14,305		
INC hold		Swing		

== See also ==
- List of constituencies of Andhra Pradesh Legislative Assembly
