= Gottipati Ravi Kumar =

Indian politician

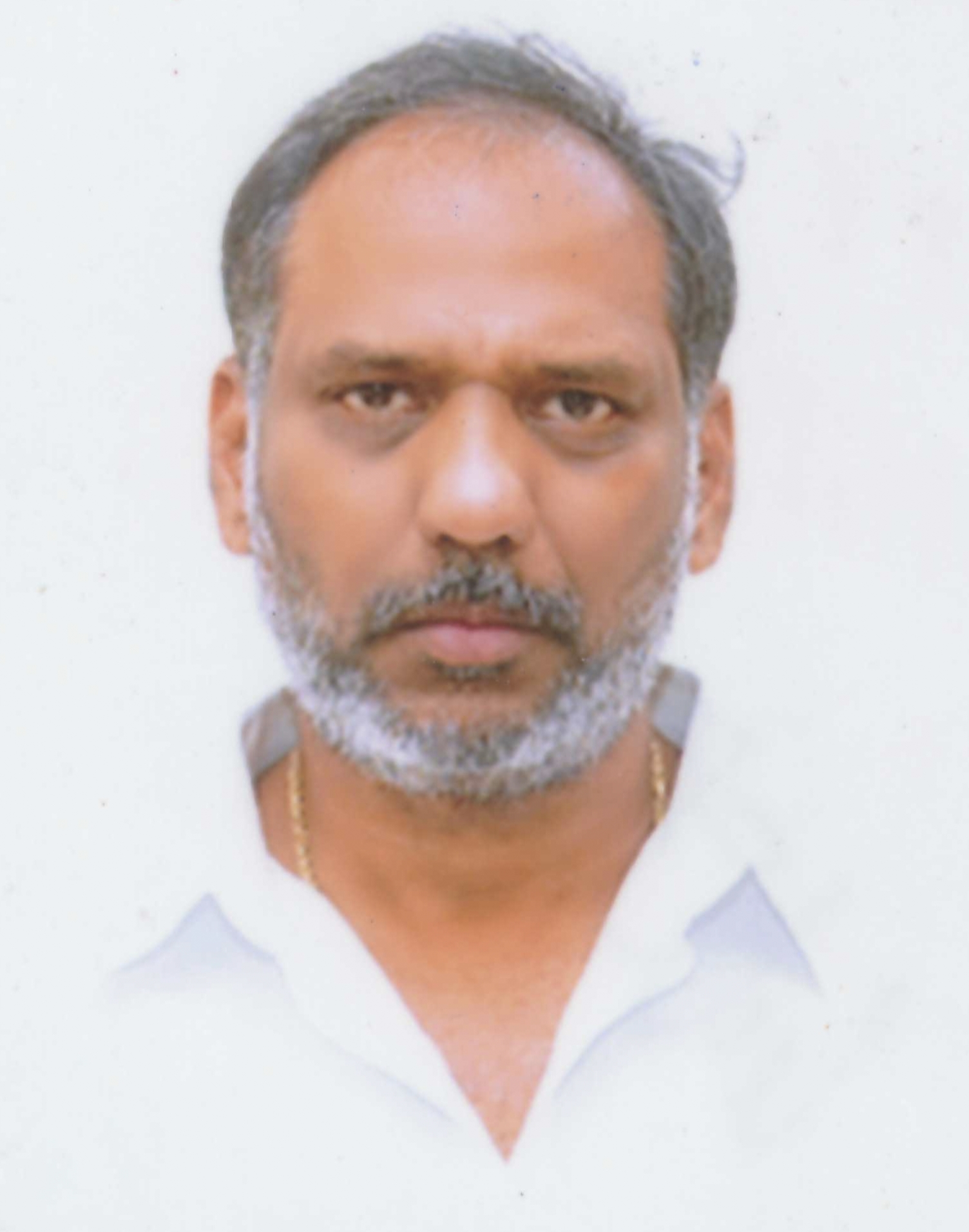

Minister of Energy Government of Andhra Pradesh
- Incumbent
- Assumed office 12 June 2024
- Governor: S. Abdul Nazeer
- Chief Minister: N. Chandrababu Naidu
- Preceded by: Peddireddy Ramachandra Reddy

Member of the Andhra Pradesh Legislative Assembly
- Incumbent
- Assumed office 2009
- Preceded by: Karanam Balarama Krishna Murthy
- Constituency: Addanki
- In office 2004–2009
- Preceded by: Gottipati Narasaiah
- Succeeded by: Constituency abolished
- Constituency: Martur

Personal details
- Born: 9 November 1974 (age 51) Pothurajugandi
- Party: Telugu Desam Party
- Other political affiliations: YSR Congress Party; Indian National Congress
- Spouse: Gottipati Jhansi
- Children: Gottipati Harsha vardhan
- Parent: Gottipati Seshagiri Rao (father)
- Education: Bapuji Institute of Engineering & Technology (1997)
- Occupation: Industrialist; Politician
- Nickname: Bujji

Gottipati Ravi Kumar (born 9 November 1974), commonly known as Bujji, is an Indian politician currently serving as an Member of the Legislative Assembly (MLA) and cabinet minister in Andhra Pradesh. He has been elected to the Andhra Pradesh Legislative Assembly five times, with four terms representing the Addanki Assembly constituency and one term for Martur Assembly constituency.

Ravi Kumar is the Minister for Energy in the current Fourth N. Chandrababu Naidu ministry and has won elections in 2004, 2009, 2014, 2019, and 2024, representing three different political parties. He is currently the member of Telugu Desam Party.

== Early life and education ==
Kumar was born in 1976 to Seshagiri Rao. He completed his intermediate studies at Vidwan Junior College in Guntur and graduated from B.I.E.T. College in Davangere, Karnataka in 1993. He is from a farming family, and also runs his own business.

== Political career ==
Kumar began his political career with the Indian National Congress (INC), contesting in the 2004 Andhra Pradesh Legislative Assembly election from the Martur Assembly constituency. He won, defeating Gottipati Narasimha Rao of the Telugu Desam Party (TDP) by a margin of 13,806 votes. In 2009 Andhra Pradesh Legislative Assembly election, he was re-elected to the Andhra Pradesh Legislative Assembly as an INC candidate, this time representing the Addanki Assembly constituency, where he defeated Karanam Balaram Krishna Murthy of TDP by a margin of 15,764 votes.

He later joined the YSR Congress Party (YSRCP) and in the 2014 Andhra Pradesh Legislative Assembly election, he won from Addanki, defeating Karanam Venkatesh of TDP by a margin of 4,235 votes. On 27 April 2016, Kumar left YSRCP and joined TDP in the presence of Andhra Pradesh Chief Minister N. Chandrababu Naidu. In the 2019 Andhra Pradesh Legislative Assembly election, he was re-elected from Addanki as a TDP candidate, defeating Bachina Chenchu Garataiah of the YSRCP by a margin of 12,991 votes.

Kumar was notably the only candidate from among the 23 YSRCP MLAs who defected to the TDP after the 2014 elections to secure a victory in 2019. In the 2024 Andhra Pradesh Legislative Assembly election, he continued his winning streak from the Addanki constituency, breaking his previous record by achieving a victory margin of 24,840 votes, setting a new personal and constituency record. In 2024, he was inducted into the Andhra Pradesh cabinet as the Minister of Energy in the Fourth N. Chandrababu Naidu ministry.

== Election history ==
Election results
Year	Office	Constituency	Party	Votes	%	Opponent	Party	Votes	%	Result	Ref
2004	MLA	Martur	Indian National Congress	64,983	55.31	Gottipati Narasaih	Telugu Desam Party	51,177	43.56	Won	
2009	MLA	Addanki	Indian National Congress	86,035	49.59	Karanam Balarama Krishna Murthy	Telugu Desam Party	70,271	40.50	Won	
2014	MLA	Addanki	YSR Congress Party	99,537	50.03	Karanam Venkatesh	Telugu Desam Party	95,302	47.90	Won	
2019	MLA	Addanki	Telugu Desam Party	105,545	50.86	Chenchu Garataiah Bachina	YSR Congress Party	92,554	44.60	Won	
2024	MLA	Addanki	Telugu Desam Party	116,418	54.02	Panem Chinna Hanimi Reddy	YSR Congress Party	91,528	42.47	Won	
