= List of ministers of energy of Andhra Pradesh =

Minister of Energy
- Vidyut Śākha Mantrī
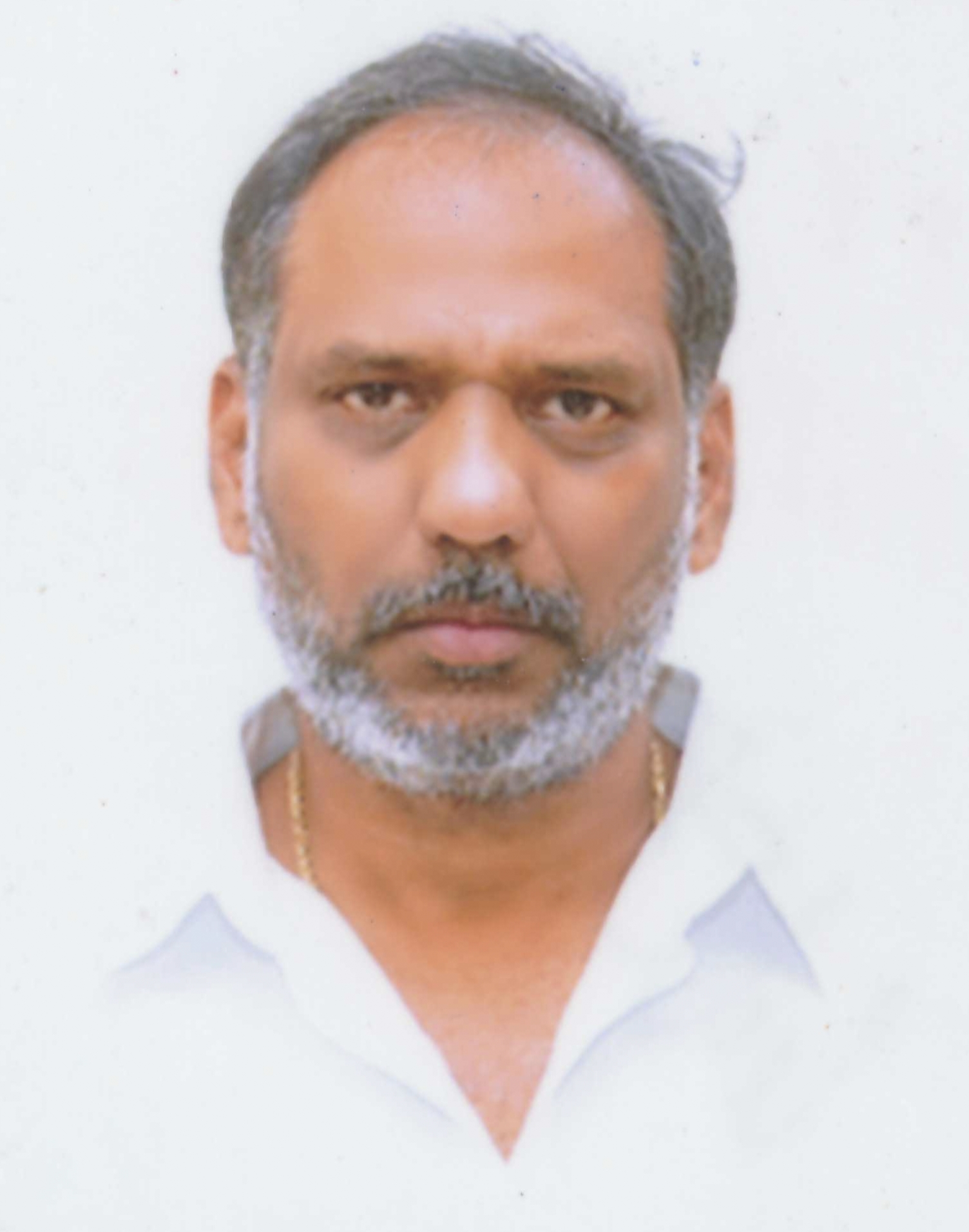
- Incumbent; Gottipati Ravi Kumar since 12 June 2024
- Department of Energy
- Member of: Andha Pradesh Cabinet
- Reports to: Governor of Andhra Pradesh; Chief Minister of Andhra Pradesh; Andhra Pradesh Legislature
- Appointer: Governor of Andhra Pradesh on the advice of the chief minister of Andhra Pradesh
- Inaugural holder: N. Chandrababu Naidu
- Formation: 8 June 2014
- Website: Official website

The Minister of Energy is the head of the Department of Energy of the Government of Andhra Pradesh.

The incumbent Minister of Energy is Gottipati Ravi Kumar from the Telugu Desam Party.

== List of ministers ==
#	Portrait	Minister (Lifespan) Constituency	Term of office			Election (Term)	Party	Ministry	Chief Minister	Ref.
#	Portrait	Minister (Lifespan) Constituency	Term start	Term end	Duration	Election (Term)	Party	Ministry	Chief Minister	Ref.
–		N. Chandrababu Naidu (born 1950); MLA for Kuppam (Chief Minister)	8 June 2014	1 April 2017	2 years, 297 days	2014 (14th)	Telugu Desam Party	Naidu III	N. Chandrababu Naidu	
1		Kimidi Kalavenkata Rao (born 1952); MLA for Etcherla	2 April 2017	29 May 2019	2 years, 57 days	2014 (14th)	Telugu Desam Party	Naidu III	N. Chandrababu Naidu	
2		Balineni Srinivasa Reddy (born 1964); MLA for Ongole	30 May 2019	7 April 2022	2 years, 312 days	2019 (15th)	YSR Congress Party	Jagan	Y. S. Jagan Mohan Reddy	
3		Peddireddy Ramachandra Reddy (born 1952); MLA for Punganur	11 April 2022	11 June 2024	2 years, 61 days	2019 (15th)	YSR Congress Party	Jagan	Y. S. Jagan Mohan Reddy	
4		Gottipati Ravi Kumar (born 1969); MLA for Addanki	12 June 2024	Incumbent	2 years, 87 days	2024 (16th)	Telugu Desam Party	Naidu IV	N. Chandrababu Naidu	
