= Visakhapatnam Assembly constituency =

Constituency of the Andhra Pradesh Legislative Assembly

Coordinates: 17.69°N 83.21°E

Visakhapatnam
- Former constituency for the Andhra Pradesh Legislative Assembly

Constituency details
- Country: India
- Region: South India
- State: Andhra Pradesh
- District: Visakhapatnam
- Lok Sabha constituency: Visakhapatnam
- Established: 1951
- Abolished: 1963
- Reservation: None

Visakhapatnam Assembly constituency was one of constituencies to Andhra Pradesh Legislative Assembly. It was part of Visakhapatnam Lok Sabha constituency. It existed from the 1951 delimitation to 1963.

Before 1 October 1953, it was part of Madras State and its member represented in the Madras Legislative Assembly. From then until 1 November 1956, it was part of Andhra State. From 1 November 1956, it was part of Andhra Pradesh until its abolition.

== Members of the Legislative Assembly ==
=== Madras State ===
Year	Con. No.	Res.	Member	Party
1952	19	ST	Tenneti Viswanadham	Kisan Mazdoor Praja Party

=== Andhra State ===
Year	Con. No.	Res.	Member	Party
1955	23	None	Ankitham Venkata Bhanoji Rao	Indian National Congress

=== Andhra Pradesh ===
Year	Con. No.	Res.	Member	Party
1962	27	None	Ankitham Venkata Bhanoji Rao	Indian National Congress

== Election results ==
=== 1962 ===
1962 Andhra Pradesh Legislative Assembly election: Visakhapatnam
Party	Candidate	Votes	%	±%
INC	Ankitham Venkata Bhanoji Rao	21,221	48.10	
Independent	Tenneti Viswanatham	17,394	39.42	
ABJS	K. S. Appala Narasimha Raju	3,391	7.69	
Independent	Nakkana Appa Rao	2,114	4.79	
Margin of victory		3,827	8.67	
Total valid votes		44,120		
Rejected ballots		1,670	3.65	
Turnout		45,790	63.78	
Registered electors		71,794		
INC hold		Swing		

=== 1955 ===
1955 Andhra State Legislative Assembly election: Visakhapatnam
Party	Candidate	Votes	%	±%
INC	Ankitham Venkata Bhanoji Rao	15,457	58.52	
Independent	Maddi Pattabhiramareddi	6,955	26.33	
CPI	Yellamanchili Vijayakumar	3,250	12.31	
Independent	Singavarapu Surya Rao	749	2.84	
Margin of victory		8,502	32.19	
Total valid votes		26,411		
Rejected ballots		0		
Turnout		26,411	45.43	
Registered electors		58,132		
INC gain from KMPP		Swing		

=== 1952 ===
1952 Madras Legislative Assembly election: Visakhapatnam
Party	Candidate	Votes	%	±%
KMPP	Tenneti Viswanadham	11,290	38.06	
Independent	S. Appala Nayudu	5,988	20.19	
Independent	C. Moses	4,249	14.33	
Socialist Party (India)	B. Mullikarjuna Rao	4,208	14.19	
INC	K. K. Sarveswarasastry	3,926	13.24	
Margin of victory		5,302	17.88	
Total valid votes		29,661		
Rejected ballots		0		
Turnout		29,661	43.44	
Registered electors		68,284		
KMPP win (new seat)				

== See also ==
- List of constituencies of the Andhra Pradesh Legislative Assembly
- Visakhapatnam-I Assembly constituency
- Visakhapatnam-II Assembly constituency
