= Karanam Balaram Krishna Murthy =

Indian politician (born 1946)

Member of Legislative Council Andhra Pradesh
- In office 6 March 2017 – 23 May 2019
- Constituency: Ongole

Member of Parliament, Lok Sabha
- In office 6 October 1999 – 13 May 2004
- Preceded by: Magunta Sreenivasulu Reddy
- Succeeded by: Magunta Sreenivasulu Reddy

Member of Legislative Assembly Andhra Pradesh
- In office 2019–2024
- Preceded by: Amanchi Krishna Mohan
- Constituency: Chirala
- In office 2004–2009
- Preceded by: Chenchu Garataiah Bachina
- Succeeded by: Gottipati Ravi Kumar
- Constituency: Addanki
- In office 1985–1994
- Preceded by: Gottipati Hanumath Rao
- Succeeded by: Gottipati Hanumanth Rao
- Constituency: Martur
- In office 1978–1983
- Preceded by: Dasari Prakasam
- Succeeded by: Chenchu Garataiah Bachina
- Constituency: Addanki

Personal details
- Born: 31 October 1946 (age 79) Thimmasamudram, Prakasam district, Andhra Pradesh
- Other political affiliations: YSR Congress Party; Indian National Congress (1978–1983)
- Spouse: Karanam Saraswathi
- Children: 3

Karanam Balaram Krishna Murthy (Karaṇaṁ Balarām Kr̥ṣṇa Mūrti), (born 31 October 1946) is an Indian politician in the state of Andhra Pradesh. He was born in Thimmasamudram village of Prakasam district in Andhra Pradesh. He was elected as MLC under MLA quota on 6 March 2017. In 2019 General elections he won as MLA from Chirala constituency with a majority of 17,912 votes.

== Politics ==
A long-timer in the Indian National Congress, he became known for rescuing the then AICC chief Indira Gandhi from a public attack, when she was touring the area in 1977 after a split in the Congress. She called him as her third son. Indira Gandhi fielded him from Addanki as Congress nominee in the 1978 elections, which was his electoral debut. When he was held in lockup on some of the charges, the police was surprised to see the turnout of people visiting him. N. T. Rama Rao who was a politician by then promised the people of Thimmasamudram that he will look into it.

== Positions held ==
- 1978–83, 1985–94 & 2004–09, 2019–incumbent – Member, Andhra Pradesh Legislative Assembly (5 terms)
- 1999 – Elected to 13th Lok Sabha
- 1999–2000 – Member, Committee on Communications, Lok Sabha
- 2017 – 2019 – Member, Andhra Pradesh Legislative Council

== Controversies ==
Apart from being the accused in several cases from unlawful assembly, murder etc., he was suspended from the Andhra Pradesh Legislative Assembly for 6 months on charges of making ‘objectionable’ remarks against the then Assembly Speaker K. R. Suresh Reddy. The Committee on Privileges of the Assembly was chaired by his former rival Gade Venkat Reddy of the then ruling Congress party. Garataiah was allegedly upset over being denied the Addanki assembly ticket in the 2009 elections. On July 9, 2019, Amanchi Krishna Mohan filed a petition in the High Court seeking the disqualification of Karanam Balaram's victory in 2019 Assembly Election. Amanchi further alleged that Karanam Balaram has given false information regarding his personal life in the election affidavit.

== See also ==
- 13th Lok Sabha
- Prakasam district
- Ongole
