= Peddireddy Dwarakanatha Reddy =

Indian politician

Member of Legislative Assembly Andhra Pradesh
- Incumbent
- Assumed office 23 May 2019
- Preceded by: G. Shankar
- Constituency: Thamballapalle

Personal details
- Party: YSR Congress Party
- Relatives: Peddireddy Ramachandra Reddy (Brother); P. V. Midhun Reddy (Nephew)

Peddireddy Dwarakanatha Reddy (born 1970) is an Indian politician from Andhra Pradesh. He is an MLA from Thamballapalle Assembly constituency in the erstwhile Chittoor district which is presently renamed as Annamayya district. He won the 2019 Andhra Pradesh Legislative Assembly election representing YSR Congress Party. He has been nominated again by YSRCP to contest the 2024 Assembly election.

== Early life and education ==
Reddy was born in Yerrathivaripalle village, Sodam mandal. His father Peddi Reddy Lakshmana Reddy was a farmer. He completed his schooling from ZP High School Sadum. Basically, he hails from an agricultural family in Punganur.

== Career ==
Reddy started his political career with YSR Congress Party and won the 2019 Andhra Pradesh Legislative Assembly election from Thamballapalle Assembly constituency defeating G. Shankar of Telugu Desam Party by a margin of 46,938 votes.
