= Tenneti Viswanadham =

Indian political figure (1895-1979)

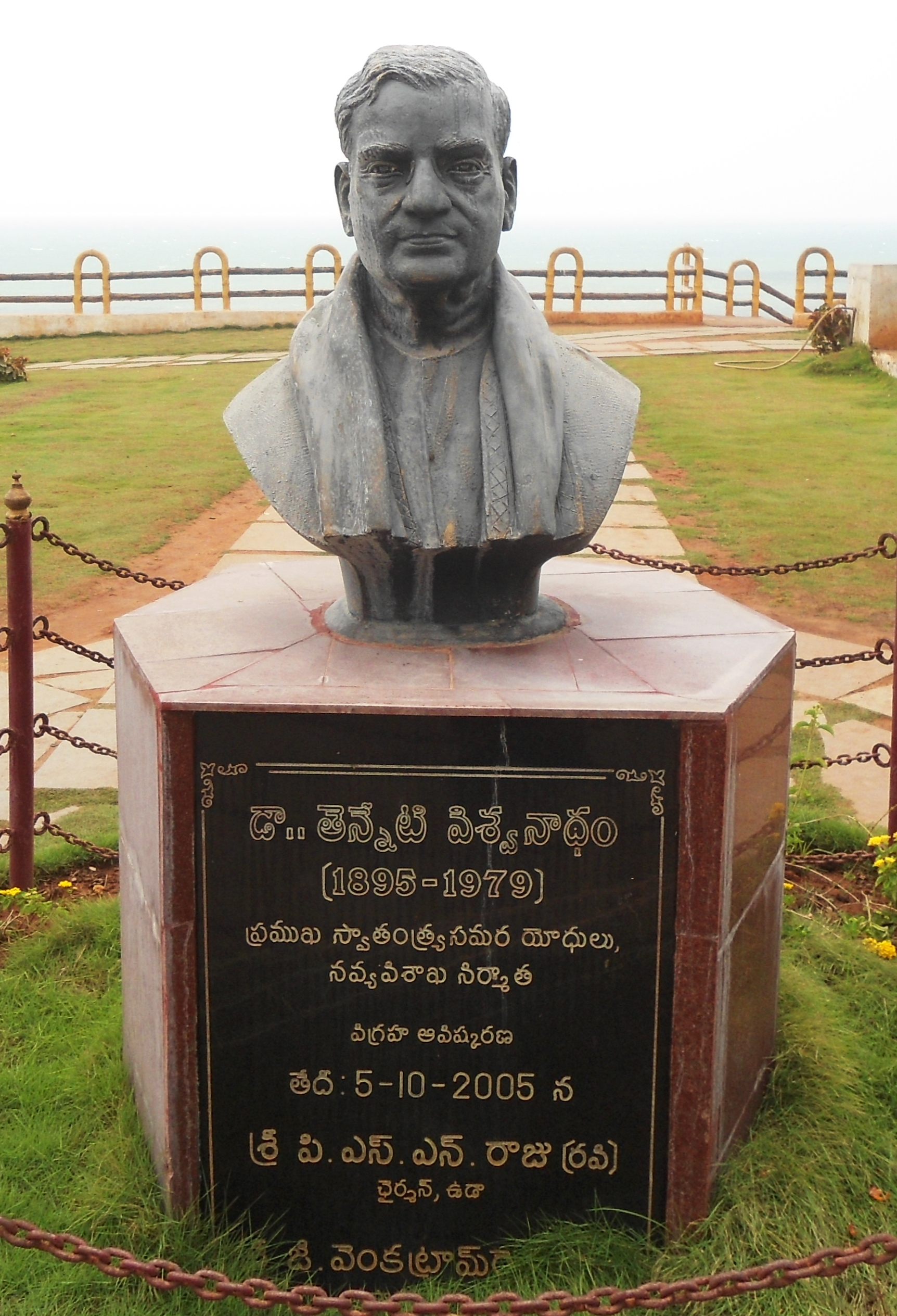
- Tenneti Vishwanatham statue at Tenneti Park

Member of Parliament, Lok Sabha
- In office 1967–1971
- Preceded by: Maharajkumar of Vizianagram
- Succeeded by: P. V. G. Raju
- Constituency: Visakhapatnam

Member of Legislative Assembly, Andhra Pradesh
- In office 1967–1967
- Preceded by: Constituency established
- Succeeded by: M. R. Deen
- Constituency: Visakhapatnam-I
- In office 1962–1967
- Preceded by: Donda Sreerama Murty
- Succeeded by: R. K. Devi
- Constituency: Madugula

Member of Legislative Assembly, Madras
- In office 1952–1955
- Preceded by: Constituency established
- Succeeded by: Ankitam Venkata Bhanojirao
- Constituency: Visakhapatnam

Personal details
- Born: 1895 Lakkavaram, Madras Presidency, British India
- Died: 1979 (aged 83–84) Visakhapatnam Andhra Pradesh, India
- Party: Indian National Congress
- Other political affiliations: Kisan Mazdoor Praja Party

Tenneti Viswanadham (1895–1979) was an Indian political figure from Visakhapatnam. He took an active part in India's struggle for independence. He is remembered now for his role in the establishment of a modern shore-based steel plant at Visakhapatnam.

== Recognitions ==
A five rupee stamp in his name was released on 10 November 2004 by Department of Posts, India.
