= Peddireddy Ramachandra Reddy =

Indian politician of Andhra Pradesh state

Minister of Mines and Geology Government of Andhra Pradesh
- In office 30 May 2019 – 11 June 2024
- Governor: E. S. L. Narasimhan; Biswabhusan Harichandan; S. Abdul Nazeer
- Chief Minister: Y. S. Jagan Mohan Reddy
- Preceded by: R. V. Sujay Krishna Ranga Rao
- Succeeded by: Kollu Ravindra

Minister of Environment, Forest, Science and Technology; Energy Government of Andhra Pradesh
- In office 11 April 2022 – 4 June 2024
- Governor: Biswabhusan Harichandan; S. Abdul Nazeer
- Chief Minister: Y. S. Jagan Mohan Reddy
- Preceded by: Balineni Srinivasa Reddy
- Succeeded by: Pawan Kalyan (as Minister of Environment, Forest, Science and Technology); Gottipati Ravi Kumar (as Minister of Energy)

Minister of Panchayat Raj and Rural Development Government of Andhra Pradesh
- In office 30 May 2019 – 7 April 2022
- Governor: E. S. L. Narasimhan; Biswabhusan Harichandan
- Chief Minister: Y. S. Jagan Mohan Reddy
- Preceded by: Nara Lokesh
- Succeeded by: Budi Mutyala Naidu

Member of the Andhra Pradesh Legislative Assembly
- Incumbent
- Assumed office 2009
- Preceded by: N. Amarnath Reddy
- Constituency: Punganur
- In office 1999–2009
- Preceded by: G. V. Sreenath Reddy
- Succeeded by: Nallari Kiran Kumar Reddy
- Constituency: Pileru
- In office 1989–1994
- Preceded by: Challa Prabhakar Reddy
- Succeeded by: G. V. Sreenath Reddy
- Constituency: Pileru

Personal details
- Born: 1 July 1952 (age 73) Errativaripalle, Sodam Mandalam, Chittor district, Andhra Pradesh
- Party: YSR Congress Party (since 2013)
- Other political affiliations: Indian National Congress (1985–2013)
- Spouse: Swarna Latha
- Children: P. V. Midhun Reddy
- Parent: Peddireddy Laxma Reddy (father)
- Relatives: Peddireddy Dwarakanatha Reddy (Brother)
- Education: PhD in sociology
- Alma mater: Sri Venkateswara University

Peddireddy Ramachandra Reddy is an Indian politician from the state of Andhra Pradesh. He formerly served as Minister of Energy, Forest, Environment, Science and Technology, Mines and Geology in the Andhra Pradesh government since April 2022. Earlier he served as the Panchayat Raj and Rural Development and Mines and Geology Minister during 2019–2022. Reddy was elected to the Andhra Pradesh Legislative Assembly from Indian National Congress from Pileru Assembly constituency till 2009 And Punganur Assembly constituency till 2014, Later From YSR Congress Party for the Punganur Assembly constituency till now. He won the 2009 elections from Punganur Assembly constituency and was appointed the Forest Minister in Y. S. Rajasekhara Reddy ministry. Post the death of Y. S. Rajasekhara Reddy, he quit the ministerial post citing differences with Kiran Kumar Reddy, the later Chief minister of Andhra Pradesh. In 2013, he joined YSR Congress Party. He later won 2014 elections and 2019 elections.

== Childhood and education ==
His education went on in his own district. He completed his PhD in sociology from Sri Venkateswara University in 1975. He was unanimously elected as the president of the Students Union during his college days at SV University.

== Early life ==
After completing his education, he entered the business sector. He first entered the construction sector and later expanded his business into irrigation and real estate sectors. He has built a reputation as a good businessman in a short span of time by undertaking the construction of various projects across the country.

== Political career ==
In 1974, he was selected as president of the student union in Sri Venkateswara University, Tirupati. In 1978, he contested as MLA on a BJP ticket from the Pileru Assembly constituency but he lost. He joined the Indian National Congress (INC) party and he again lost in 1985, AP assembly elections from the Congress party. He was elected thrice as Member of Legislative Assembly (MLA) from the Pileru constituency from the Congress party. From 1995, he worked as district president for 9 years from the Congress party. In 2008, he was appointed vice president of the PCC. From 2009-2010, he served as minister of forest in Y.S Rajashekar Reddy, Roshaiah’s Cabinet.

In 2009, in Andhra Pradesh legislative elections, he won the position of Member of Legislative Assembly (MLA) from Punganur Assembly constituency of the Congress party. He joined the YSR Congress Party (YSRCP). From 2015, he worked as state chief secretary from the YSRCP party.

He was a senior leader of the YSRCP party. In 2014 Andhra Pradesh Legislative election, he was elected as Member of Legislative Assembly (MLA) with the highest majority of 1,04,587 votes from the YSRCP party. In 2019, he won the post of Member of Legislative Assembly (MLA) with the highest majority of 1,07,431 votes from the YSRCP party. In 2019, he was appointed Minister for Panchayat Raj & Rural Development. In 2024 Andhra Pradesh Legislative Assembly election, he won by slight margin of nearly 6,000 votes.

== Election statistics ==
	Year	Contested For	Party	Constituency	Opponent	Votes	Majority	Result
1	1978	MLA	Janata Party	Pileru	Mogal Sufulla Baig (INC)	22,203 - 36,476	-14,273	Lost
2	1985	MLA	Indian National Congress	Pileru	Challa Prabhakara Reddy (INC)	37,938 - 42,187	-4,249	Lost
3	1989	MLA	Indian National Congress	Pileru	Challa Ramachandhra Reddy (TDP)	61,191 - 36,555	+24,636	Won
4	1994	MLA	Indian National Congress	Pileru	G. V. Srinath Reddy (TDP)	47,505 - 57,160	-9,655	Lost
5	1999	MLA	Indian National Congress	Pileru	G. V. Srinath Reddy (TDP)	62,562 - 49,129	+13,433	Won
6	2004	MLA	Indian National Congress	Pileru	G. V. Srinath Reddy (TDP)	67,328 - 45,740	+21,588	Won
7	2009	MLA	Indian National Congress	Punganur	M. Venkata Ramana Raju (TDP)	84,083 - 43,356	+40,727	Won
8	2014	MLA	YSR Congress Party	Punganur	M. Venkata Ramana Raju (TDP)	1,04,587 - 72,856	+31,731	Won
9	2019	MLA	YSR Congress Party	Punganur	N. Anesha Reddy (TDP)	1,07,876	+43,555	Won
10	2024	MLA	YSR Congress Party	Punganur	Challa Ramachandhra Reddy (TDP)	1,00,793- 94,698	+6,538	Won
