= Tenneti Park =

Park in Visakhapatnam, India

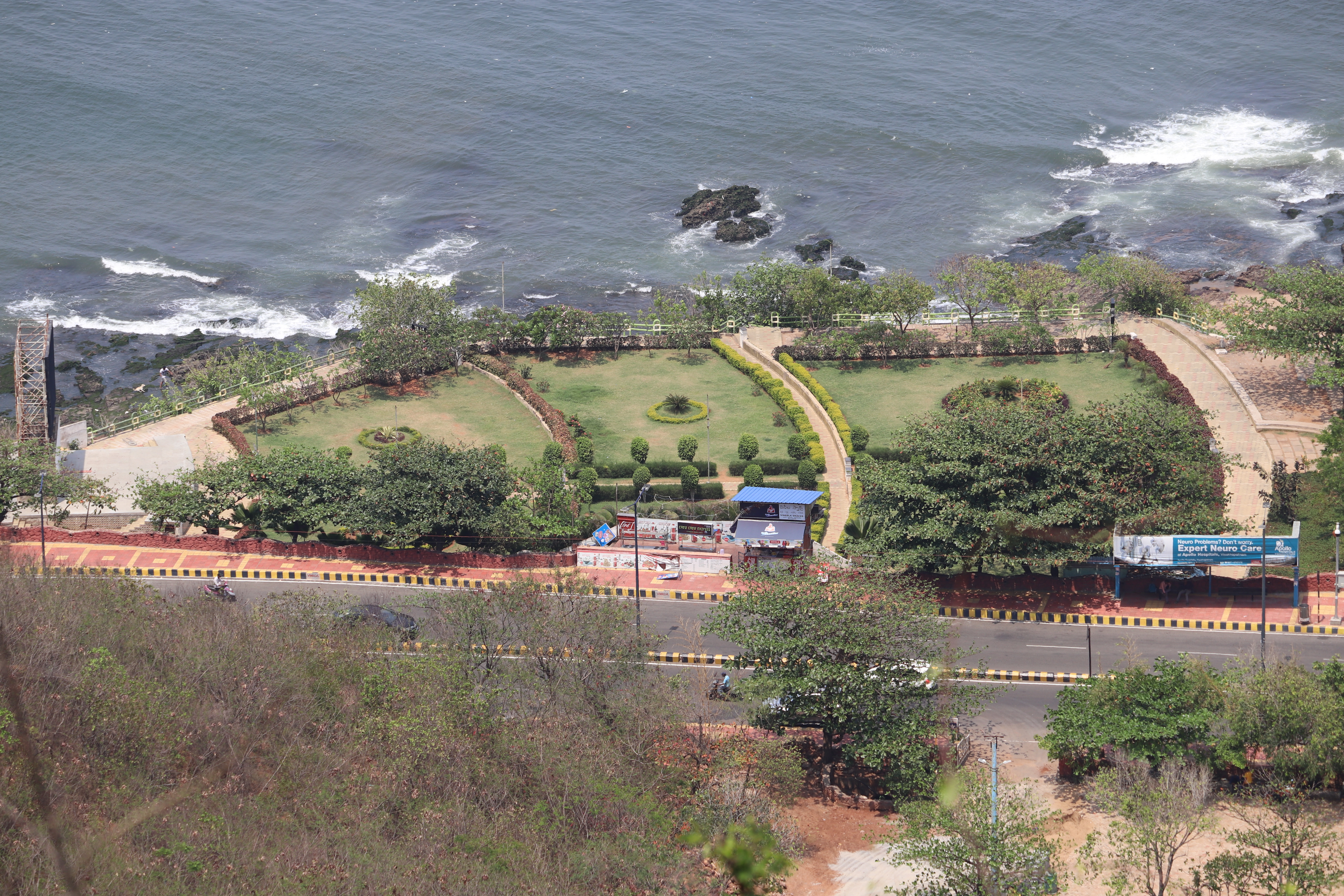
- Park view from the Kailasagiri
- Interactive map of Tenneti Park
- Type: Urban park
- Location: Beach road, Visakhapatnam
- Nearest city: Visakhapatnam, India
- Coordinates: 17°44′53″N 83°21′00″E
- Created: 10 January 1991; 35 years ago

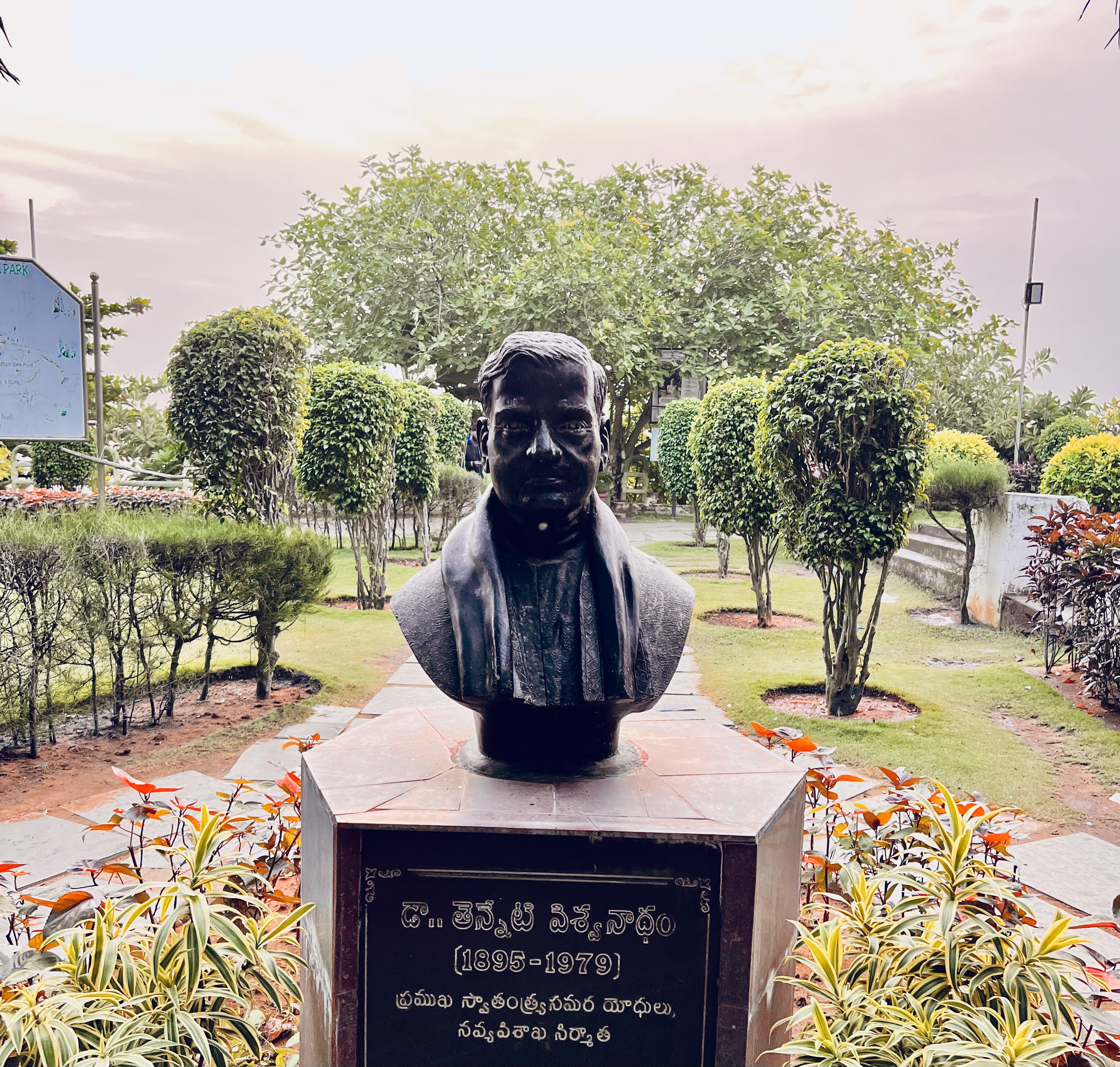
Tenneti Viswanatham’s statue

Tenneti Park also known as (Vuda Tenneti Park) is an urban park in the city of Visakhapatnam. It is a coastal park in the city known for its scenery and recreational amenities. Overlooking the Bay of Bengal, the park has views of the sea with surrounding coastline and the cityscape. Named after Mr. Tenneti Viswanadham, a freedom fighter and social reformer, the park features greenery, gardens and walking paths. Additionally, Tenneti Park is a destination for outdoor activities such as picnics, family outings, and photography, attracting both locals and tourists alike. Over the years, Tenneti Park has been featured in several films across different genres. Post Cyclone Hudhud, an alumni group from GITAM university came forward and donated money for the face-lift of the park.

== MV Maa ==
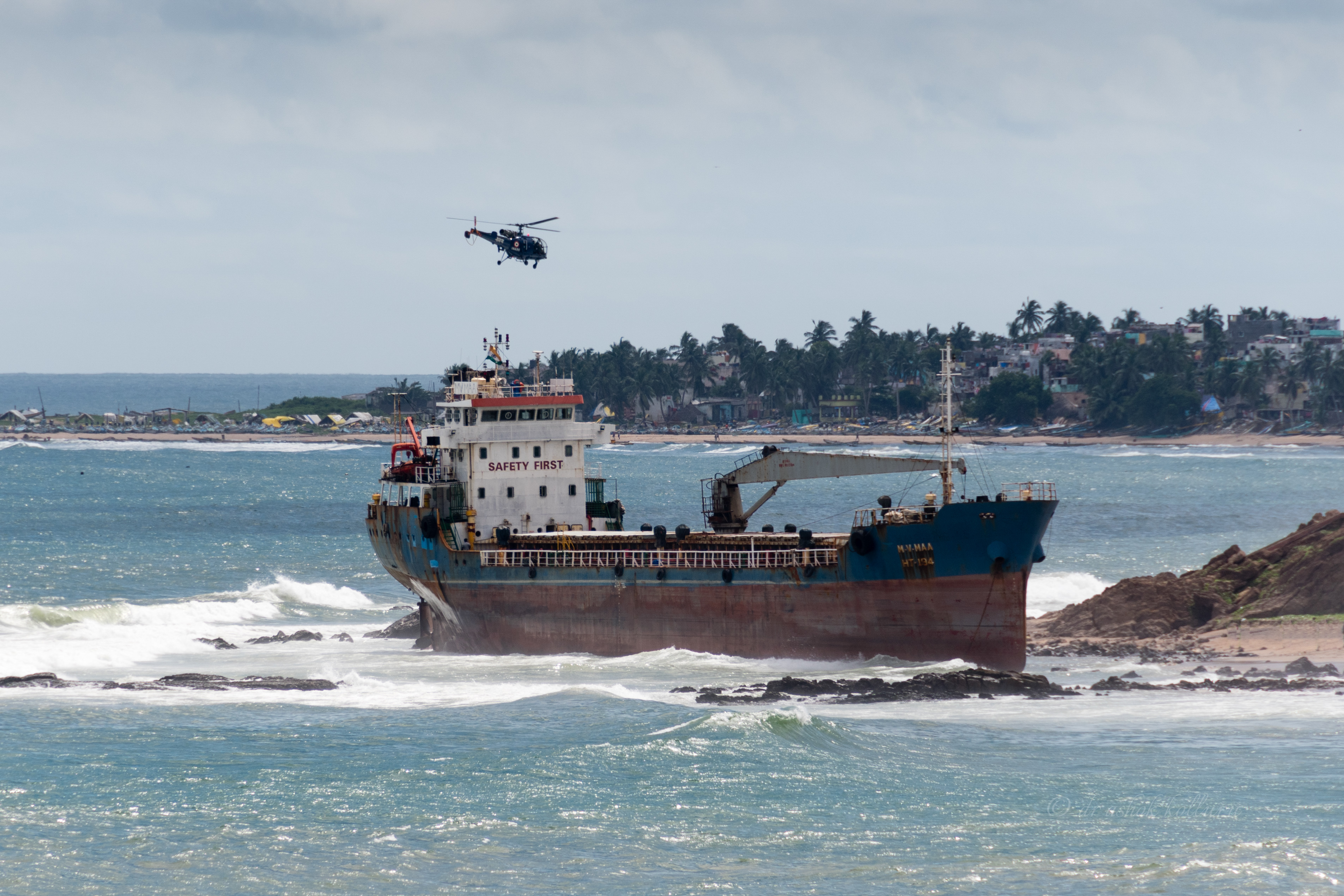
Helicopter hovers above the ship stranded on the beach

A maritime event involving the Bangladeshi merchant vessel MV Maa, which ran aground at Tenneti Park beach. The incident occurred during Cyclone Nivar in October 2020, causing the vessel to become stranded on the shore. MV Maa, measuring 80 meters in length, faced challenges in refloating, prompting various stakeholders to undertake salvage operations and assess the situation. Following the grounding, efforts were made to assess the vessel's condition and devise a plan to refloat the ship again. However, despite these efforts, the ship remained stranded till date.

In December 2021, the then Tourism Minister announced plans to convert the ship into a floating restaurant. However, it was delayed due to the COVID-19 pandemic and lack of permissions from concerned departments have temporarily halted the project. According to the Regional Director of the Tourism Department, essential infrastructure such as an approach road from the temple at Tenneti Park to the ship, supporting structures for the vessel, and basic amenities including washrooms and change rooms on the beach are required. Given proximity to the coast, they planned it to be eco-friendly. Plans also include the use of battery-operated vehicles to transport visitors, particularly elderly persons, senior citizens, and children, from the beach area to the ship. The ship's open deck may serve as a venue for celebrations, while the interior can house the restaurant. MV Maa has become an attraction for visitors, including pre-marriage photoshoots, social media influencers, and filmmakers.
