= G. Shankar Yadav =

Indian politician

Gullolla Shankar Yadav (born 1967) is an Indian politician from Andhra Pradesh. He was a former member of the Andhra Pradesh Legislative Assembly from the Thamballapalle Assembly constituency representing the Telugu Desam Party, in the erstwhile Chittoor district, which is presently in the new Annamayya district. In 2026, he was named as Thamballapalle constituency incharge of TDP.

== Early life ==
Yadav is from T. Sadum village, Peddathippasamudram Mandal, Chittoor district, Andhra Pradesh. He is the son of the late G Venkataramana. He completed his BA in 1985 at the Municipal First Grade College, Chintamani, which is affiliated with the Bangalore University. He is into real estate business and declared assets worth Rs.28 crore in 2014 and Rs.39 crore in 2019 in his affidavits to the Election Commission of India.

== Career ==
Yadav made his electoral debut contesting the 2009 Andhra Pradesh Legislative Assembly election on a Congress ticket but lost. In the next election he shifted and won from Thamballapalle Assembly constituency in the 2014 Andhra Pradesh Legislative Assembly election representing the Telugu Desam Party. He polled 82,090 votes and defeated his nearest rival, A. V. Praveen Kumar Reddy of the YSR Congress party, by a margin of 9,190 votes. He lost the 2019 Andhra Pradesh Legislative Assembly election to his nearest opponent Peddireddy Dwarkanath Reddy of the YSR Congress Party, who secured 1,05,444 votes. He polled 58,506 votes and lost by a margin of 46,938 votes.

In 2024, he was denied a ticket to contest the Thamballepalle seat by the Telugu Desam Party.
