= Martur Assembly constituency =

Defunct Legislative Assembly constituency in Andhra Pradesh, India

Coordinates: 15.99°N 80.10°E

Martur
- Former constituency for the Andhra Pradesh Legislative Assembly

Constituency details
- Country: India
- Region: South India
- State: Andhra Pradesh
- District: Prakasam
- Lok Sabha constituency: Bapatla
- Established: 1978
- Abolished: 2008
- Total electors: 142,411 (2004)
- Reservation: None

Martur was one of the 294 Legislative Assembly constituencies of Andhra Pradesh in India. It was in Prakasam district, and was dissolved before the 2009 elections. Most of its area is now in Parchur Assembly constituency and Addanki Assembly constituency.

== History of the constituency ==
Martur Assembly Constituency was first created for the 1955 Andhra State Assembly elections and existed until 1967, abolished in the Delimitation Act 1961. It was again reformed in the 1978 Assembly elections and existed until the 2008 delimitation. After passing of the Delimitation of Parliamentary and Assembly Constituencies Order, 1976, its extent was the Martur and Kommalapadu firkas in Addanki taluk, Marella firka, Tammalur, Sankarapuram, Avisanavaripalem, Polavaram, Pedaravipad, Vempadu, Mundlamur, Malkapuram villages in Tallur firka of Darsi taluk. It was abolished due to the Delimitation of Parliamentary and Assembly Constituencies Order, 2008 and hence was defunct as of the 2009 Andhra Pradesh Legislative Assembly election.

== Members of the Legislative Assembly ==
Year	Member	Political party
1955	Bandlamudi Venkata Sivayya	Krishikar Lok Party
1962	Nooti Venkateswarlu	Indian National Congress
1978	Jagarlamudi Chandramouli	Janata Party
1983	Gottipati Hanumantha Rao	Telugu Desam Party
1983^	Daggubati Venkateswara Rao	Telugu Desam Party
1985	Karanam Balarama Krishna Murthy	Telugu Desam Party
1989	Karanam Balarama Krishna Murthy	Telugu Desam Party
1994	Gottipati Hanumantha Rao	Independent
1999	Gottipati Narasaiah	Telugu Desam Party
2004	Gottipati Ravi Kumar	Indian National Congress

== Election results ==
=== 2004 ===
2004 Andhra Pradesh Legislative Assembly election: Martur
Party	Candidate	Votes	%	±%
INC	Gottipati Ravi Kumar	64,983	55.31%	
TDP	Gottipati Narsaiah	51,177	43.56%	
Margin of victory		13,806	11.75%	
Turnout		117,492	82.48%	
Registered electors		142,477		
INC gain from TDP		Swing		

=== 1999 ===
1999 Andhra Pradesh Legislative Assembly election: Martur
Party	Candidate	Votes	%	±%
TDP	Gottipati Narsaiah	73,422	67.35%	
INC	Narra Seshagiri Rao	33,763	30.97%	
Margin of victory		39,659	36.38%	
Turnout		111,021	69.54%	
Registered electors		161,988		
TDP gain from Independent		Swing		

=== 1994 ===
1994 Andhra Pradesh Legislative Assembly election: Martur
Party	Candidate	Votes	%	±%
Independent	Gottipati Hanumnatha Rao	55,482	51.36%	
INC	Karanam Balarama Krishna Murthy	46,349	42.91%	
Margin of victory		9,133	8.45%	
Turnout		109,473	79.97%	
Registered electors		136,889		
Independent gain from TDP		Swing		

=== 1989 ===
1989 Andhra Pradesh Legislative Assembly election: Martur
Party	Candidate	Votes	%	±%
TDP	Karanam Balarama Krishna Murthy	60,226	54.13%	
INC	Gottipati Hanumantha Rao	50,101	45.03%	
Margin of victory		10,125	9.10%	
Turnout		114,778	75.87%	
Registered electors		151,283		
TDP hold		Swing		

=== 1985 ===
1985 Andhra Pradesh Legislative Assembly election: Martur
Party	Candidate	Votes	%	±%
TDP	Karanam Balarama Krishna Murthy	51,138	56.83%	
INC	Kandimalla Subba Rao	37,840	42.06%	
Margin of victory		13,298	14.78%	
Turnout		91,261	71.63%	
Registered electors		127,404		
TDP hold		Swing		

=== 1983 ===
1983 Andhra Pradesh Legislative Assembly election: Martur
Party	Candidate	Votes	%	±%
TDP	Gottipati Hanumantha Rao	41,846	54.91%	
INC	Kandimalla Butchaiah	33,352	43.76%	
Margin of victory		8,494	11.14%	
Turnout		77,476	73.40%	
Registered electors		105,558		
TDP gain from JP		Swing		

=== 1978 ===
1978 Andhra Pradesh Legislative Assembly election: Martur
Party	Candidate	Votes	%	±%
JP	Jagarlamudi Chandramouli	39,067	51.36%	
INC(I)	Kandimalla Butchaiah	27,963	36.76%	
INC	Kavuri Venkateswarlu	8,203	10.78%	
Margin of victory		11,104	14.60%	
Turnout		77,644	77.40%	
Registered electors		100,314		
JP win (new seat)				

=== 1962 ===
1962 Andhra Pradesh Legislative Assembly election: Martur
Party	Candidate	Votes	%	±%
INC	Nooti Venkateswarlu	17,974	40.04%	
	Kandimalla Butchaiah	16,141	35.95%	
Margin of victory		1,833	4.08%	
Turnout		46,787	63.72%	
Registered electors		73,428		
INC gain from KLP		Swing		

=== 1955 ===
1955 Andhra Pradesh Legislative Assembly election: Martur
Party	Candidate	Votes	%	±%
KLP	Bandlamudi Venkatasivayya	24,419	60.53%	
CPI	Pedavalli Sriramulu	15,926	39.47%	
Margin of victory		8,493	21.05%	
Turnout		40,345	62.58%	
Registered electors		64,469		
KLP win (new seat)				
