= Thamballapalle Assembly constituency =

Indian constituency

Coordinates: 13.82°N 78.45°E

Thamballapalle
- Constituency No. 162 for the Andhra Pradesh Legislative Assembly
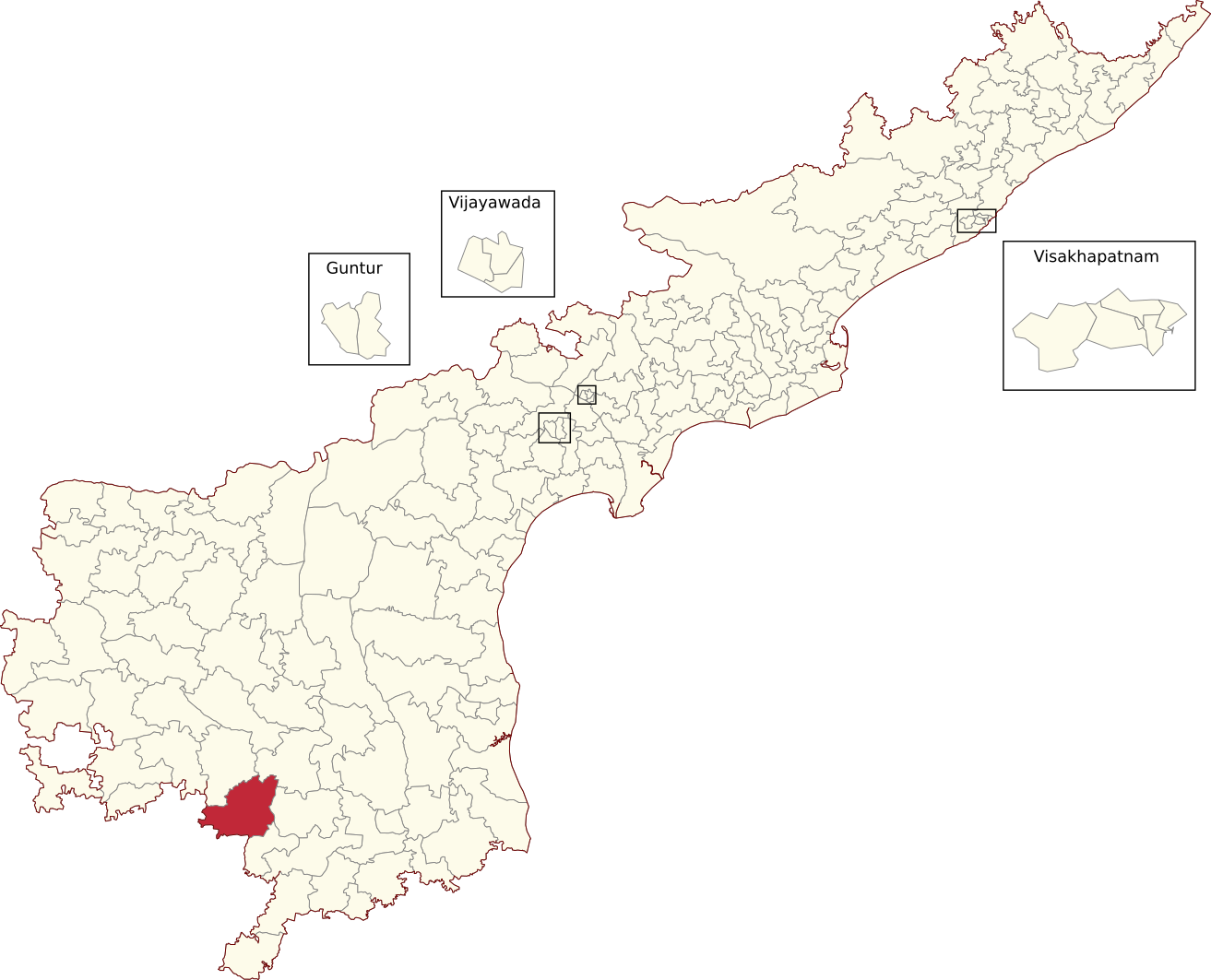
- Location of Thamballapalle Assembly constituency within Andhra Pradesh

Constituency details
- Country: India
- Region: South India
- State: Andhra Pradesh
- District: Annamayya
- Lok Sabha constituency: Rajampet
- Established: 1955
- Total electors: 209,834
- Reservation: None

Member of Legislative Assembly
- 16th Andhra Pradesh Legislative Assembly
- Incumbent Peddireddy Dwarakanatha Reddy
- Party: YSR Congress Party
- Elected year: 2019

Thamballapalle Assembly constituency is a constituency in Annamayya district of Andhra Pradesh that elects representatives to the Andhra Pradesh Legislative Assembly in India. It is one of the seven assembly segments of Rajampet Lok Sabha constituency.

Peddireddy Dwarakanatha Reddy is the current MLA of the constituency, having won the 2019 Andhra Pradesh Legislative Assembly election from YSR Congress Party. As of 25 March 2019, there are a total of 209,834 electors in the constituency. The constituency was established in 1955, as per the Delimitation Orders (1955).

== Mandals ==
Thamballapalle Assembly constituency consists of six Mandals.

Mandals
Thambalapalle
Mulakalacheru
Peddamandyam
Kurabalakota
B.Kothakota
Peddathippasamudram

== Members of the Legislative Assembly ==
Year	Member	Political party
Andhra State
1955	T. N. Venkatasubba Reddy	Indian National Congress
United Andhra
1962	Kadapa Narasimha Reddy	Swatantra Party
1967	T. N. Anasuyamma	Indian National Congress
1972	T. N. Anasuyamma	Indian National Congress
1978	Avula Mohana Reddy	Indian National Congress
1983	T. N. Srinivasa Reddy	Independent
1985	Anipireddi Venkata Lakshmi Devamma	Telugu Desam Party
1989	Kalicherla Prabakar Reddy	Independent
1994	Anipireddi Venkata Lakshmi Devamma	Telugu Desam Party
1999	Kalicherla Prabakar Reddy	Indian National Congress
2004	Kalicherla Prabakar Reddy	Indian National Congress
2009	Anipireddy Venkata Praveen Kumar Reddy	Telugu Desam Party
Andhra
2014	G. Shankar Yadav	Telugu Desam Party
2019	Peddireddy Dwarkanath Reddy	YSR Congress Party
2024	Peddireddy Dwarkanath Reddy	YSR Congress Party

== Election results ==
=== 2024 ===
2024 Andhra Pradesh Legislative Assembly election: Thamballapalle
Party	Candidate	Votes	%	±%
YSRCP	Peddireddy Dwarakanatha Reddy	94,136	50.11	
TDP	D.Jayachandra Reddy	84,033	44.73	
INC	MN Chandra Sekhar Reddy	3,444	1.83	
NOTA	None Of The Above	2,384	1.27	
Majority		10,103	5.37	
Turnout		1,87,866		
YSRCP hold		Swing		

=== 2019 ===
2019 Andhra Pradesh Legislative Assembly election: Thamballapalle
Party	Candidate	Votes	%	±%
YSRCP	Peddireddy Dwarkanath Reddy	105,444	59.48	
TDP	G. Shankar Yadav	58,506	33.00	
Majority		46,938	26.47	
Turnout		1,77,269	84.77	
YSRCP gain from TDP		Swing		

=== 2014 ===
2014 Andhra Pradesh Legislative Assembly election: Thamballapalle
Party	Candidate	Votes	%	±%
TDP	G. Shankar Yadav	82,090	50.4	
YSRCP	Anipireddy Venkata Praveen Kumar Reddy	72,900	44.76	
Majority		9,190	5.64	
Turnout		1,62,876	5.64	
TDP gain from YSRCP		Swing		

=== 2009 ===
2009 Andhra Pradesh Legislative Assembly election: Thamballapalle
Party	Candidate	Votes	%	±%
TDP	Anipireddy Venkata Praveen Kumar Reddy	46,653	32.02	
INC	G. Shankar Yadav	43,695	29.99	
PRP	Kadapa Prabhakar Reddy	30,109	20.67	
Majority		2,958	26.47	
Turnout		1,45,692	83.30	
TDP gain from INC		Swing		

== See also ==
- List of constituencies of Andhra Pradesh Vidhan Sabha
