= Thimmasamudram, Prakasam district =

Thimmasamudram
- village
- Interactive map of Thimmasamudram
- Location in Andhra Pradesh, India
- Coordinates: 15°47′0″N 80°14′0″E
- Country: India
- State: Andhra Pradesh
- District: Prakasam

Population
  - Total: 70,000

Languages
  - Official: Telugu
- Time zone: UTC+5:30 (IST)
- PIN: 523185
- Telephone code: 08593
- Vehicle registration: AP-
- Nearest city: Chirala
- Andhra Assembly constituency: ONGOLE

Thimmasamudram is a village located in Naguluppala Padu Mandal of Prakasam district, Andhra Pradesh, India.
