= Chenchu Garataiah Bachina =

Indian politician (born 1948)

Member of Legislative Assembly Andhra Pradesh
- In office 1994–2004
- Preceded by: Raghav Rao Jagarlamudi
- Succeeded by: Karanam Balaram Krishna Murthy
- Constituency: Addanki
- In office 1983–1989
- Preceded by: Karanam Balaram Krishna Murthy
- Succeeded by: Raghav Rao Jagarlamudi
- Constituency: Addanki

Personal details
- Born: 1 March 1948 (age 78) Panguluru Mandal, Prakasam district, Andhra Pradesh, India
- Party: Telugu Desam party
- Spouse: Ratna Kumari
- Children: 3

He is in Telugu Desam party now

Chenchu Garataiah Bachina (born 1 March 1948), or Bachina Chenchu Garataiah, is an Indian politician of Telugu Desam Party.

== Personal life ==
Chenchu Garataiah Bachina was born and brought up in Panguluru Mandal of Prakasam District of Andhra Pradesh. His father was Bachina Veera Raghavaiah and his mother was Lakshmi Kanthamma.

He and his wife, Ratna Kumari, have three children. He pursued SSC, PUC and acquired M.B.B.S. Degree from Jawaharlal Nehru Medical College, Belgaum, Karnataka in the year 1972. Chenchu Garataiah worked as a house surgeon in Gandhi Medical College, Secunderabad during 1972 to 1973 and in 1974 he worked as a house surgeon in Ongole.

== Political career ==
In 1973, as a house surgeon, he learned of the problems faced by his patients, the farmers in his native village, Panguluru. He formed a Co-operative Society for Panguluru with 200 members with an amount of Rs.20,000. From 1974 onward, he started to focus on problems in areas like transportation, electricity, communication and irrigation, which motivated him to enter politics.
