= Addanki Assembly constituency =

Constituency of the Andhra Pradesh Legislative Assembly, India

Coordinates: 15.81°N 79.97°E

Addanki
- Constituency No. 105 for the Andhra Pradesh Legislative Assembly
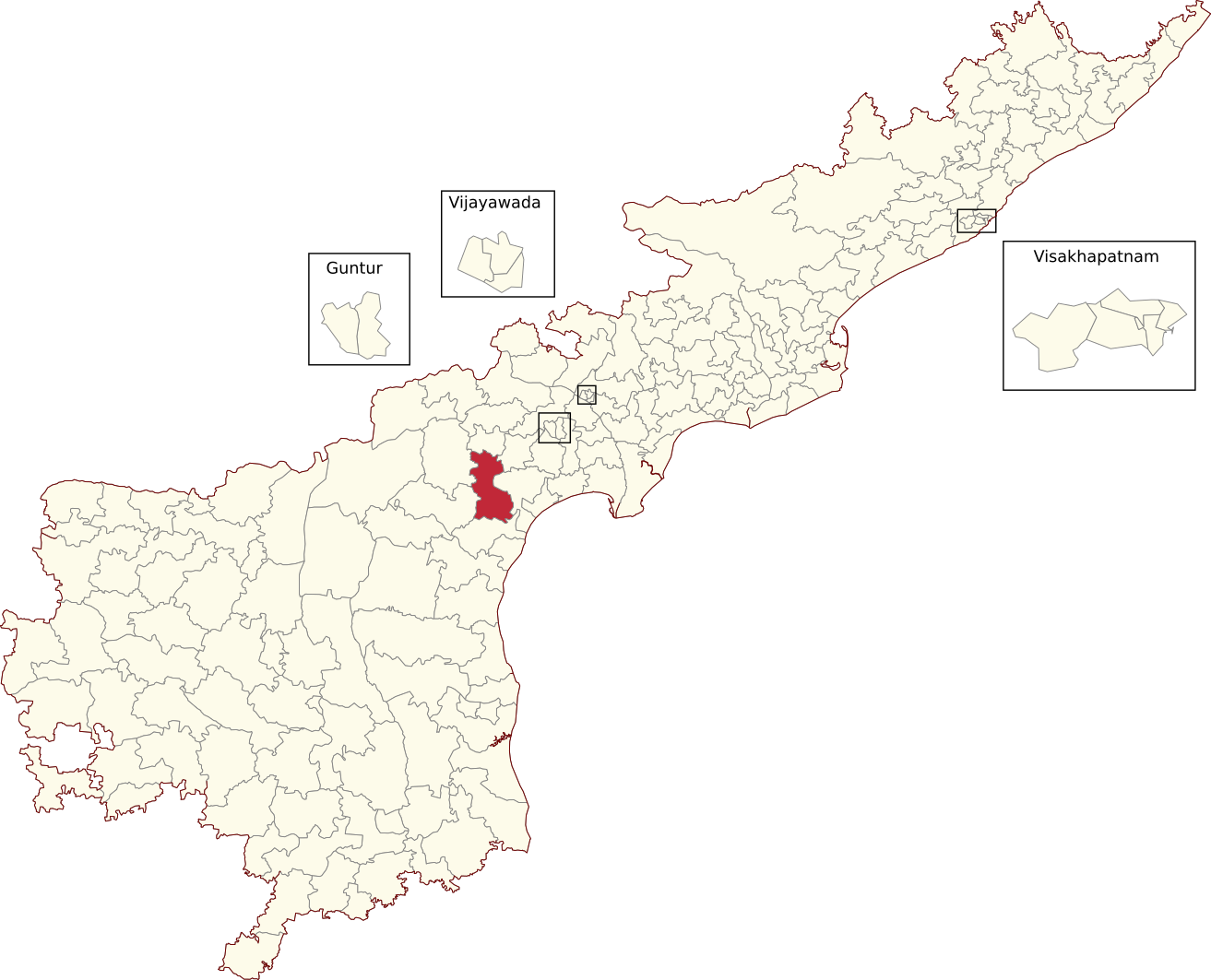
- Location of Addanki Assembly constituency within Andhra Pradesh

Constituency details
- Country: India
- Region: South India
- State: Andhra Pradesh
- District: Prakasam
- Lok Sabha constituency: Bapatla
- Established: 1955
- Total electors: 231,843
- Reservation: None

Member of Legislative Assembly
- 16th Andhra Pradesh Legislative Assembly
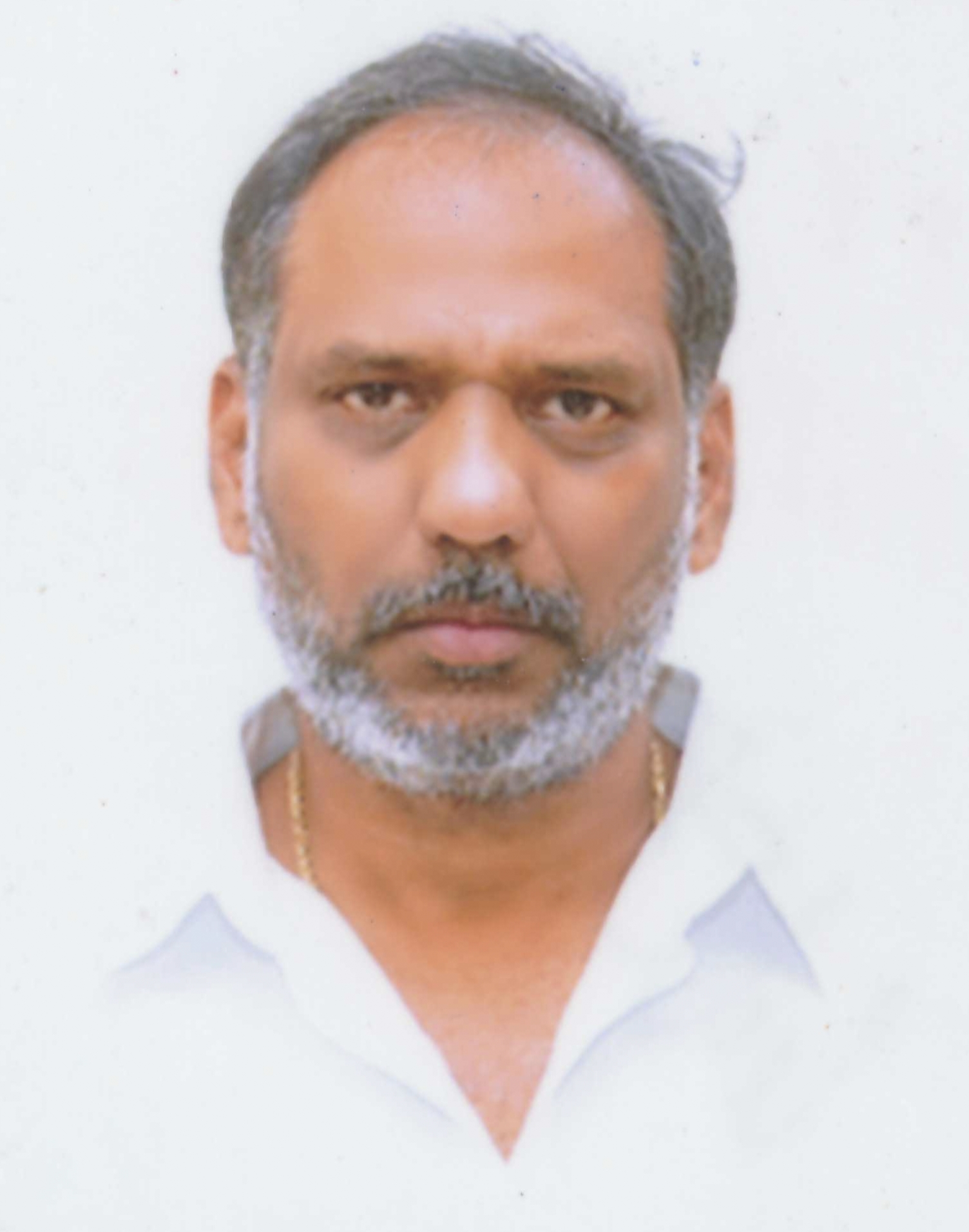
- Incumbent Gottipati Ravi Kumar
- Party: TDP
- Alliance: NDA
- Elected year: 2024

Addanki Assembly constituency is a constituency in Prakasam district of Andhra Pradesh that elects representatives to the Andhra Pradesh Legislative Assembly in India. It is one of the seven assembly segments of Bapatla Lok Sabha constituency.

Gottipati Ravi Kumar (Bujji) is the current MLA of the constituency, having won the 2024 Andhra Pradesh Legislative Assembly election from Telugu Desam Party. As of 2019, there are a total of 231,843 electors in the constituency. The constituency was established in 1955, as per the Delimitation Orders (1955).

== Mandals ==
Mandal
Janakavaram Panguluru
Addanki
Santhamaguluru
Ballikurava
Korsipadu

== Members of the Legislative Assembly ==
Year	Member	Political party
1955	Nagineni Venkaiah	Krishikar Lok Party
1962	Patibandla Ranganayakulu	Communist Party of India
1967	Dasari Prakasam	Indian National Congress
1972	Dasari Prakasam	Indian National Congress
1978	Karanam Balarama Krishna Murthy	Indian National Congress (I)
1983	Chenchu Garataiah Bachina	Telugu Desam Party
1985	Chenchu Garataiah Bachina	Telugu Desam Party
1989	Jagarlamudi Raghav Rao	Indian National Congress
1994	Chenchu Garataiah Bachina	Independent politician
1999	Chenchu Garataiah Bachina	Telugu Desam Party
2004	Karanam Balarama Krishna Murthy	Telugu Desam Party
2009	Gottipati Ravi Kumar (Bujji)	Indian National Congress
2014	Gottipati Ravi Kumar (Bujji)	YSR Congress Party
2019	Gottipati Ravi Kumar (Bujji)	Telugu Desam Party
2024	Gottipati Ravi Kumar (Bujji)	Telugu Desam Party

== Election results ==
=== 1955 ===
1955 Andhra Pradesh Legislative Assembly election: Addanki
Party	Candidate	Votes	%	±%
KLP	Nagineni Venkaiah	21,870	59.25	
CPI	Patibandla Ranganayakulu	15,042	40.75	
Majority		6,828	18.50	
Turnout		36,912	68.47	
KLP gain from		Swing		

=== 1962 ===
1962 Andhra Pradesh Legislative Assembly election: Addanki
Party	Candidate	Votes	%	±%
CPI	Patibandla Ranganayakulu	18,356	42.72	
INC	Pachina Apparao	14,584	33.94	
Majority		3,772	8.78	
Turnout		44,945	64.82	
CPI gain from KLP		Swing		

=== 1967 ===
1967 Andhra Pradesh Legislative Assembly election: Addanki
Party	Candidate	Votes	%	±%
INC	Dasari Prakasam	27,517	45.95	
SWA	Venkaiah Nagineni	25,449	42.49	
Majority		2,068	3.45	
Turnout		63,476	73.92	
INC gain from CPI		Swing		

=== 1972 ===
1972 Andhra Pradesh Legislative Assembly election: Addanki
Party	Candidate	Votes	%	±%
INC	Dasari Prakasam	28,914	48.26	
Independent	Narra Subba Rao	19,832	33.10	
Majority		9,082	15.16	
Turnout		61,306	61.98	
INC hold		Swing		

=== 1978 ===
1978 Andhra Pradesh Legislative Assembly election: Addanki
Party	Candidate	Votes	%	±%
INC(I)	Karanam Balarama Krishna Murthy	36,312	44.65	
JP	Chenchu Garataiah Bachina	31,162	38.31	
Majority		5,150	6.33	
Turnout		83,261	78.77	
INC(I) gain from INC		Swing		

=== 1983 ===
1983 Andhra Pradesh Legislative Assembly election: Addanki
Party	Candidate	Votes	%	±%
TDP	Chenchu Garataiah Bachina	41,068	50.36	
INC	Karanam Balarama Krishna Murthy	37,674	46.20	
Majority		3,394	4.16	
Turnout		83,460	72.24	
TDP gain from INC(I)		Swing		

=== 1985 ===
1985 Andhra Pradesh Legislative Assembly election: Addanki
Party	Candidate	Votes	%	±%
TDP	Chenchu Garataiah Bachina	47,813	52.59	
INC	Jagarlamudi Hanumaiah	42,253	46.48	
Majority		5,560	6.12	
Turnout		92,123	70.36	
TDP hold		Swing		

=== 1989 ===
1989 Andhra Pradesh Legislative Assembly election: Addanki
Party	Candidate	Votes	%	±%
INC	Jagarlamudi Raghava Rao	54,521	52.99	
TDP	Chenchu Garataiah Bachina	47,439	46.11	
Majority		7,082	6.88	
Turnout		107766	69.60	
INC gain from TDP		Swing		

=== 1994 ===
1994 Andhra Pradesh Legislative Assembly election: Addanki
Party	Candidate	Votes	%	±%
Independent	Chenchu Garataiah Bachina	50,757	51.62	
INC	Jagarlamudi Raghava Rao	43,708	44.45	
Majority		7,049	7.17	
Turnout		99630	73.73	
Independent gain from INC		Swing		

=== 1999 ===
1999 Andhra Pradesh Legislative Assembly election: Addanki
Party	Candidate	Votes	%	±%
TDP	Chenchu Garataiah Bachina	53,670	48.83	
INC	Jagarlamudi Raghava Rao	53,421	48.60	
Majority		249	0.23	
Turnout		112,100	67.99	
TDP hold		Swing		

=== 2004 ===
2004 Andhra Pradesh Legislative Assembly election: Addanki
Party	Candidate	Votes	%	±%
TDP	Karanam Balarama Krishna Murthy	56,356	50.74	+1.91
INC	Jagarlamudi Raghava Rao	53,566	48.23	−0.37
Majority		2,790	2.51	
Turnout		111,006	80.09	+13.42
TDP hold		Swing		

=== 2009 ===
2009 Andhra Pradesh Legislative Assembly election: Addanki
Party	Candidate	Votes	%	±%
INC	Gottipati Ravi Kumar	86,035	49.59	+1.36
TDP	Karanam Balarama Krishna Murthy	70,271	40.50	−10.24
PRP	Kotapothula Jwala Rao	11,236	6.48	
Majority		15,764	9.09	
Turnout		173,491	84.73	+4.64
INC gain from TDP		Swing		

=== 2014 ===
2014 Andhra Pradesh Legislative Assembly election: Addanki
Party	Candidate	Votes	%	±%
YSRCP	Gottipati Ravi Kumar	99,537	50.03	
TDP	Venkatesh Karanam	95,302	47.90	
Majority		4,235	2.13	
Turnout		198,944	90.25	+5.52
YSRCP gain from INC		Swing		

=== 2019 ===
2019 Andhra Pradesh Legislative Assembly election: Addanki
Party	Candidate	Votes	%	±%
TDP	Gottipati Ravi Kumar (Bujji)	105,545	50.86	
YSRCP	Chenchu Garataiah Bachina	92,554	44.6	
JSP	Sri Krishna Kancharla	4375	2.11	2.11
Majority		12,991	6.26	
Turnout		207501		
TDP gain from YSRCP		Swing		

=== 2024 ===
2024 Andhra Pradesh Legislative Assembly election: Addanki
Party	Candidate	Votes	%	±%
TDP	Gottipati Ravi Kumar(Bujji)	116,418	54.02	
YSRCP	Panem Chinna Hanimi Reddy	91528	42.47	
INC	Adusumalli Kishore Babu	4072	1.89	
NOTA	None Of The Above	1600	0.74	
Majority		24890	11.548	
Turnout		215518		
		Swing		

== See also ==
- List of constituencies of Andhra Pradesh Legislative Assembly
