= 2012 Andhra Pradesh Legislative Assembly by-election =

- 10 March, 18 March and 12 June 2012

Vacant 25 seats in the Andhra Pradesh Legislative Assembly
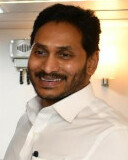

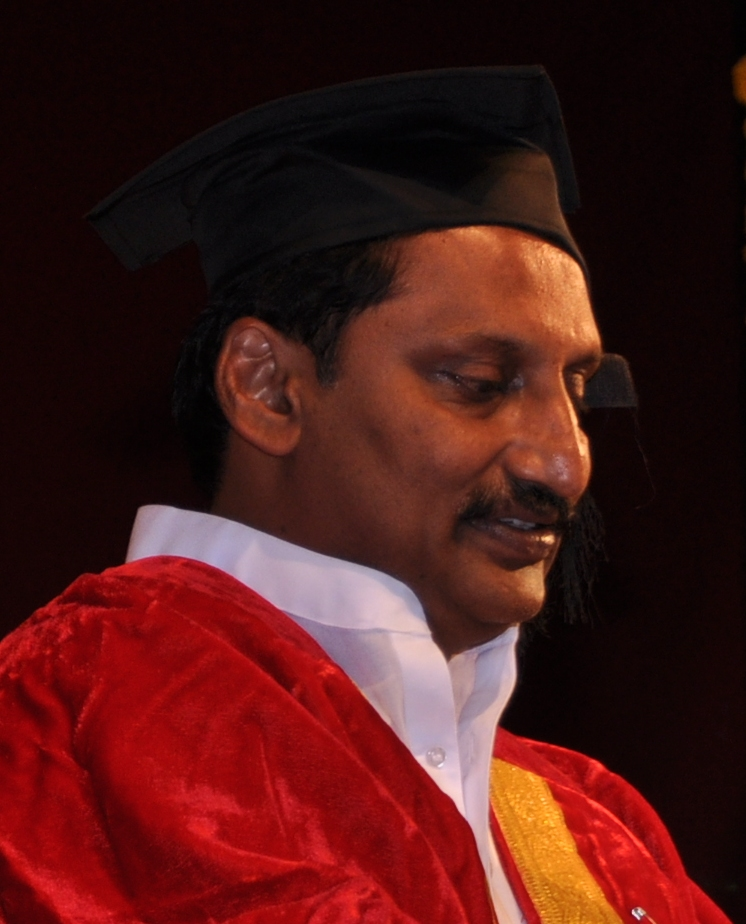

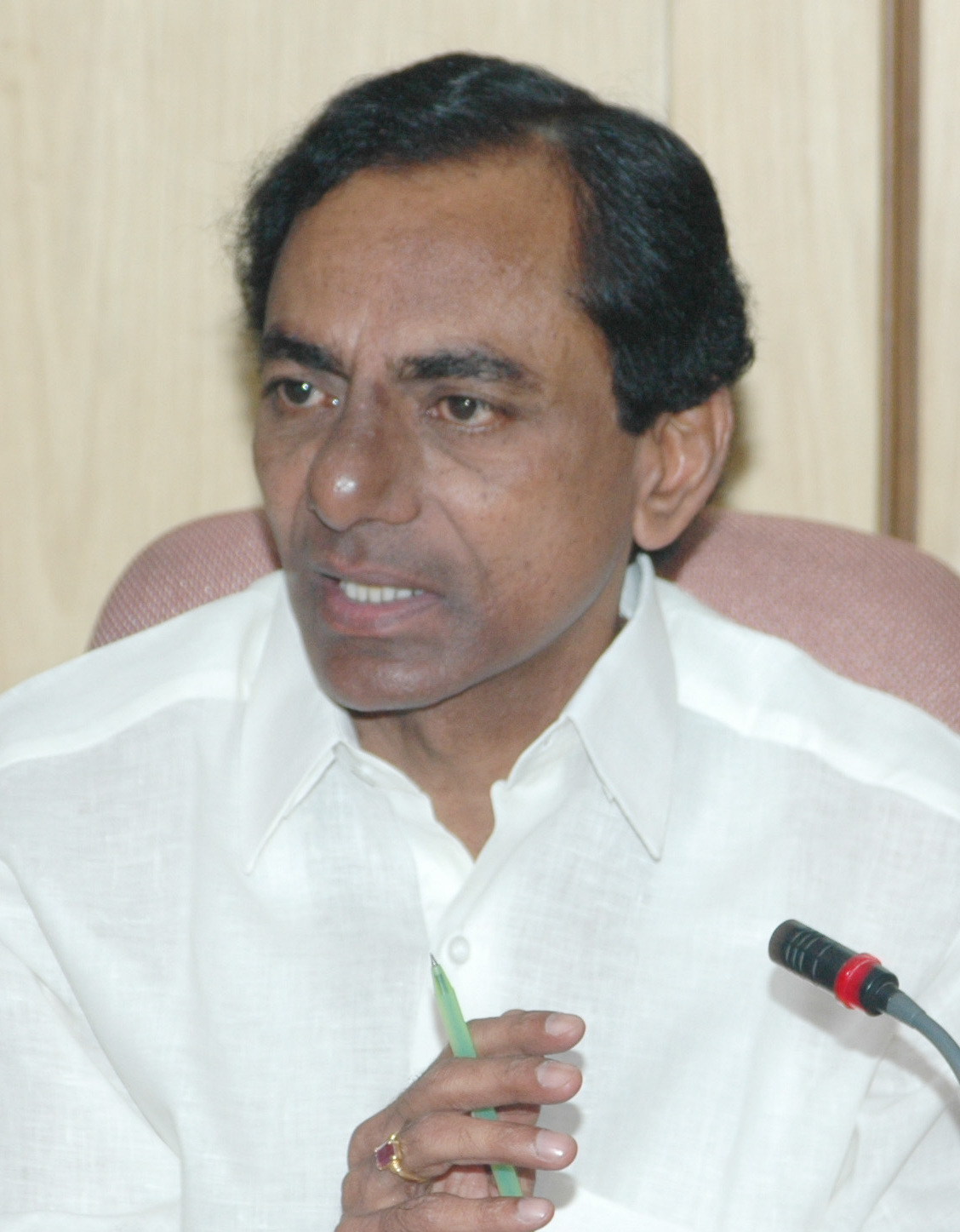

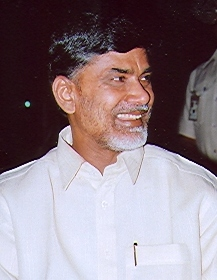
	Majority party	Minority party
Leader	Y. S. Jaganmohan Reddy	N. Kiran Kumar Reddy
Party	YSRCP	INC
Leader since	2011	2010
Leader's seat	Did not contest (Note: Incumbent member of the Lok Sabha from the Kadapa Lok Sabha constituency.)	Did not contest (Note: Incumbent member of the Andhra Pradesh Legislative Assembly from the Pileru Assembly constituency.)
Seats before	0	20 (Note: Including two seats form the Praja Rajyam Party, which merged into the Indian National Congress in 2011.)
Seats won	16	2
Seat change	▲16	▼18
	Third party	Fourth party
Leader	K. Chandrashekhar Rao	N. Chandrababu Naidu
Party	TRS	TDP
Leader since	2001	1995
Leader's seat	Did not contest (Note: Incumbent member of the Lok Sabha from the Mahabubnagar Lok Sabha constituency.)	Did not contest (Note: Incumbent member of the Andhra Pradesh Legislative Assembly from the Kuppam Assembly constituency.)
Seats before	0	4
Seats won	5	0
Seat change	▲5	▼4
Chief Minister before election
N. Kiran Kumar Reddy
INC
Chief Minister after election
N. Kiran Kumar Reddy
INC

The 2012 Andhra Pradesh Legislative Assembly by-election was held from March to June 2012 in three phases to fill vacancies to the 25 seats in the Andhra Pradesh Legislative Assembly, following the death, resignation and disqualification of the incumbent members.

== Background ==
Following the 2009 Andhra Pradesh Legislative Assembly election, Y. S. Rajasekhara Reddy was sworn in as Chief Minister of Andhra Pradesh but died shortly thereafter in a helicopter crash. His death, along with the intensifying Telangana movement, contributed to a period of political instability in the state. His son, Y. S. Jagan Mohan Reddy later fell out with the Indian National Congress (INC) and formed the YSR Congress Party (YSRCP). Many MLAs in the Andhra region left the INC to join YSRCP, while in the Telangana region, several MLAs joined the Telangana Rashtra Samithi in demand for a separate state. These mass defections led to disqualifications, leaving assembly seats vacant and necessitating by-elections, which were held on 10 March 2012 for 1 seat, on 18 March 2012 for 6 seats and on 12 June 2012 for 18 seats.

== Campaign ==
The enforcement authorities seized approximately Rs. 32 crores in cash and gold valued around Rs. 9 crore, taking the total to Rs. 41 crore. Nearly 1.74 lakh litres of liquor were confiscated during the campaign period. The reported total exceeded the amount seized during the 2009 Andhra Pradesh Legislative Assembly election.

On 27 May 2012, the Central Bureau of Investigation (CBI) arrested Y. S. Jagan Mohan Reddy in connection with alleged disproportionate assets and corruption charges. The CBI alleged that Jagan had received investments from various companies in return for granting undue favours during the tenure of his father, Y. S. Rajashekhara Reddy as Chief Minister of the state from 2004 to 2009. Following his arrest, Jagan was remanded to judicial custody and lodged in Chanchalguda Central Jail, Hyderabad. His bail petitions were rejected multiple times.

With Jagan in judicial custody, the party's campaign was led by his mother Y. S. Vijayamma and his sister Y. S. Sharmila. Sharmila addressed multiple public meetings across constituencies, appealing to voters on grounds of perceived injustice and continuity of her father's welfare activities.

Public sentiment during the by-election varied regionally, with voters in the Telangana region focused on the demand for a separate state, while in the Andhra region, the arrest of Y. S. Jagan Mohan Reddy was an electoral factor.

== Results ==
The result for the first and second phase of the by-election was declared on 21 March 2012. For the first time, 3G technology was used to upload polling and counting data to the internet more quickly, with the counting process recorded using the web cameras. The TRS won 4 seats, while the Bharatiya Janata Party, the YSRCP and an independent candidate won one seat each.

The third phase result was declared on 15 June 2012, the YSRCP emerged as the largest winner, winning 15 of the 18 contested seats. The INC won 2 seats, increasing its majority to 154 seats in the 294 member Andhra Pradesh Legislative Assembly. The TRS won one seat and the Telugu Desam Party drew blank. Notably, all the incumbent members who had resigned and re-contested were re-elected in both phases.

Following the declaration of the results, Y. S. Sharmila stated that her brother Y. S. Jagan Mohan Reddy, who was then in judicial custody in connection with corruption charges, should become the Chief Minister in 2014. Chief Minister N. Kiran Kumar Reddy subsequently held meetings with party leaders and legislators to review the results.

=== Results by constituency ===
District	Constituency		Reason	Winner				Runner Up				Margin
District	No.	Name	Reason	Candidate	Party	Votes	%	Candidate	Party	Votes	%	Margin
Adilabad	7	Adilabad	(Note: Resignation of the incumbent member Jogu Ramanna from Telugu Desam Party as MLA.)	Jogu Ramanna	TRS	59,452	49.34	C. Ram Chandra Reddy	INC	28,056	23.28	31,396
Nizamabad	16	Kamareddy	(Note: Resignation of the incumbent member Gampa Govardhan from Telugu Desam Party as MLA.)	Gampa Govardhan	TRS	75,699	55.23	Adla Raja Reddy	INC	31,234	22.79	44,465
Mahbubnagar	74	Mahbubnagar	(Note: Death of the incumbent member N. Rajeshwar Reddy, an independent, on 30 October 2011.)	Yennam Srinivas Reddy	BJP	39,385	31.51	Ibrahim Syed	TRS	37,506	30.01	1,879
Mahbubnagar	81	Nagarkurnool	(Note: Resignation of the incumbent member Nagam Janardhan Reddy from Telugu Desam Party as MLA.)	Nagam Janardhan Reddy	IND	71,001	50.55	Kuchakulla Damoder Reddy	INC	43,676	31.09	27,325
Mahbubnagar	85	Kollapur	(Note: Resignation of the incumbent member Jupally Krishna Rao from Indian National Congress as MLA.)	Jupally Krishna Rao	TRS	58,107	38.47	Mamillapally Vishnuvardhan Reddy	INC	43,083	28.53	15,024
Warangal	99	Ghanpur Station (SC)	(Note: Resignation of the incumbent member T. Rajaiah from Indian National Congress as MLA.)	T. Rajaiah	TRS	81,279	47.84	Kadiyam Srihari	TDP	48,641	28.63	32,638
Nellore	235	Kovur	(Note: Resignation of the incumbent member Nallapareddy Prasanna Kumar Reddy from Telugu Desam Party as MLA.)	Nallapareddy Prasanna Kumar Reddy	YSRCP	73,876	42.00	Somireddy Chandra Mohan Reddy	TDP	50,382	28.64	23,494
Warangal	104	Parkal	(Note: Resignation of the incumbent member Konda Surekha from Indian National Congress as MLA.)	M. Bikshpathi	TRS	51,936	33.05	Konda Surekha	YSRCP	50,374	32.05	1,562
Srikakulam	127	Narasannapeta	(Note: Resignation of the incumbent member Dharmana Krishna Das from Indian National Congress as MLA.)	Dharmana Krishna Das	YSRCP	54,454	38.96	Dharmana Rama Das	INC	47,412	33.73	7,312
Visakhapatnam	152	Payakaraopet (SC)	(Note: Resignation of the incumbent member Golla Babu Rao from Indian National Congress as MLA.)	Golla Babu Rao	YSRCP	71,963	41.88	Changala Venkata Rao	TDP	57,601	33.53	14,362
East Godavari	161	Ramachandrapuram	(Note: Resignation of the incumbent member Pilli Subhash Chandra Bose from Indian National Congress as MLA.)	Thota Trimurthulu	INC	77,292	49.93	Pilli Subhash Chandra Bose	YSRCP	65,373	42.23	11,919
West Godavari	177	Narasapuram	(Note: Resignation of the incumbent member Mudunuri Prasada Raju from Indian National Congress as MLA.)	Kothapalli Subbarayudu	INC	58,368	46.96	Mudunuri Prasada Raju	YSRCP	53,896	43.36	4,472
West Godavari	186	Polavaram (ST)	(Note: Resignation of the incumbent member Tellam Balaraju from Indian National Congress as MLA.)	Tellam Balaraju	YSRCP	80,790	53.87	B. S. Rao	TDP	45,023	30.02	35,767
Guntur	212	Prathipadu (Guntur) (SC)	(Note: Resignation of the incumbent member Mekathoti Sucharitha from Indian National Congress as MLA.)	Mekathoti Sucharitha	YSRCP	87,742	48.84	Kandukuri Veeraiah	TDP	70,961	39.50	16,781
Guntur	220	Macherla	(Note: Resignation of the incumbent member Pinnelli Ramakrishna Reddy from Indian National Congress as MLA.)	Pinnelli Ramakrishna Reddy	YSRCP	79,751	46.67	Chirumamilla Madhu Babu	TDP	64,272	37.61	15,479
Prakasam	227	Ongole	(Note: Resignation of the incumbent member Balineni Srinivasa Reddy from Indian National Congress as MLA.)	Balineni Srinivasa Reddy	YSRCP	77,222	48.80	Damacharla Janardhana Rao	TDP	49,819	31.48	27,403
Nellore	242	Udayagiri	(Note: Resignation of the incumbent member Mekapati Chandrasekhar Reddy from Indian National Congress as MLA.)	Mekapati Chandrasekhar Reddy	YSRCP	75,103	46.82	Bollineni Venkata Ramarao	TDP	44,505	27.74	30,598
Kadapa	244	Rajampet	(Note: Resignation of the incumbent member Akepati Amarnath Reddy from Indian National Congress as MLA.)	Akepati Amarnath Reddy	YSRCP	76,951	52.49	Meda Venkata Mallikarjuna Reddy	INC	38,732	26.42	38,219
Kadapa	246	Kodur (SC)	(Note: Resignation of the incumbent member Koramutla Sreenivasulu from Indian National Congress as MLA.)	Koramutla Sreenivasulu	YSRCP	66,456	53.80	E. Kanuparthi	INC	34,465	27.90	31,991
Kadapa	247	Rayachoty	(Note: Resignation of the incumbent member Gadikota Srikanth Reddy from Indian National Congress as MLA.)	Gadikota Srikanth Reddy	YSRCP	90,978	57.15	Sugavasi Subramanyam	TDP	34,087	21.41	56,891
Kurnool	253	Allagadda	(Note: Resignation of the incumbent member Bhuma Shobha Nagi Reddy from Praja Rajyam Party, upon merger with the Indian National Congress as MLA.)	Bhuma Shobha Nagi Reddy	YSRCP	88,697	52.68	G. Prathap Reddy	INC	51,902	30.83	36,795
Kurnool	263	Yemmiganur	(Note: Resignation of the incumbent member K. Chennakesava Reddy from Indian National Congress as MLA.)	K. Chennakesava Reddy	YSRCP	64,155	42.07	B. V. Mohan Reddy	TDP	44,052	28.89	20,103
Anantapur	267	Rayadurg	(Note: Resignation of the incumbent member Kapu Ramachandra Reddy from Indian National Congress as MLA.)	Kapu Ramachandra Reddy	YSRCP	79,171	46.34	D. R. Gunapati	TDP	46,695	27.33	32,476
Anantapur	272	Anantapur Urban	(Note: Resignation of the incumbent member Bodimalla Gurunatha Reddy from Indian National Congress as MLA.)	Bodimalla Gurunatha Reddy	YSRCP	65,719	52.90	M. Sreenivasulu	TDP	40,980	32.98	24,739
Chittoor	286	Tirupati	(Note: Resignation of the incumbent member Konidela Chiranjeevi from Praja Rajyam Party, upon merger with the Indian National Congress as MLA.)	Bhumana Karunakar Reddy	YSRCP	59,195	43.29	M. Venkararamana	INC	41,220	30.14	17,975

== Analysis ==
The Hindu read this as possibly predictive of the 2014 general election. It also said that while the YSRCP was the favourite, there was a keen eye on who would finish second between the INC and the TDP. Rediff headlined the result as the "fledgling YSR Congress party...has swept the by-elections in Andhra Pradesh, denting the last bastion of Congress in south." It also pointed out that the loss of Tirupati was significant as it was the home district of the INC Chief Minister N. Kiran Kumar Reddy and had previously been won by Chiranjeevi before his resignation to seek a Rajya Sabha seat. The Economic Times referred to the YSRCP's successful result as "riding on the sympathy wave in the wake of its leader Y.S. Jaganmohan Reddy's arrest", and the Hindustan Times had a similar assessment.
