= Sugavasi Palakondrayudu =

Indian politician (1946–2025)

Member of Parliament, Lok Sabha
- In office 1984–1989
- Preceded by: Pothuraju Parthasarthy
- Succeeded by: Sai Prathap Annayyagari
- Constituency: Rajampet

Member of the Andhra Pradesh Legislative Assembly for Rayachoti
- In office 1999–2009
- Preceded by: M. Narayana Reddy
- Succeeded by: Gadikota Srikanth Reddy
- In office 1978–1985
- Preceded by: Habibullah Mahal
- Succeeded by: Mandipalle Nagi Reddy

Personal details
- Born: 3 July 1946 Rayachoti, Madras Province, British India
- Died: 6 May 2025 (aged 78) Bengaluru, Karnataka, India
- Party: Telugu Desam (1999–2009)
- Other political affiliations: Janata Party (1978–1983)
- Children: 3

Sugavasi Palakondrayudu (3 July 1946 – 6 May 2025) was an Indian politician.

== Background ==
Palakondrayudu was born in Rayachoti village, now in Cuddapah district, Andhra Pradesh, on 3 July 1946. He passed matriculation at Z.P. High School, Rayachoty.

He married on 2 December 1968, and had two sons and one daughter. Palakondrayudu died while undergoing treatment for illness at a Bengaluru hospital, on 6 May 2025. He was 78.

== Career ==
Palakondrayudu was a candidate of Janata Party and won in Andhra Pradesh state legislative assembly from Rayachoti assembly constituency in Kadapa district in 1978. He won a second time as an independent candidate from Rayachoti assembly constituency in 1983. He joined the Telugu Desam Party and won Lok Sabha Membership from Rajampet Lok Sabha constituency in Andhra Pradesh in 1984. He won in Rayachoti assembly constituency in 1999 and 2004 from the Telugu Desam Party.
