= Adinarayana =

Adinarayana is an Indian name and it may refer to

- C. Adinarayana Reddy, Indian politician
- P. Adinarayana Rao, Music director
- S. V. Adinarayana Rao, Orthopaedic surgeon
- Y. Adinarayana Reddy, Indian politician and freedom fighter
- Adinarayana Hosahalli, Village in Karnataka
