= Meda Venkata Mallikarjuna Reddy =

Indian politician

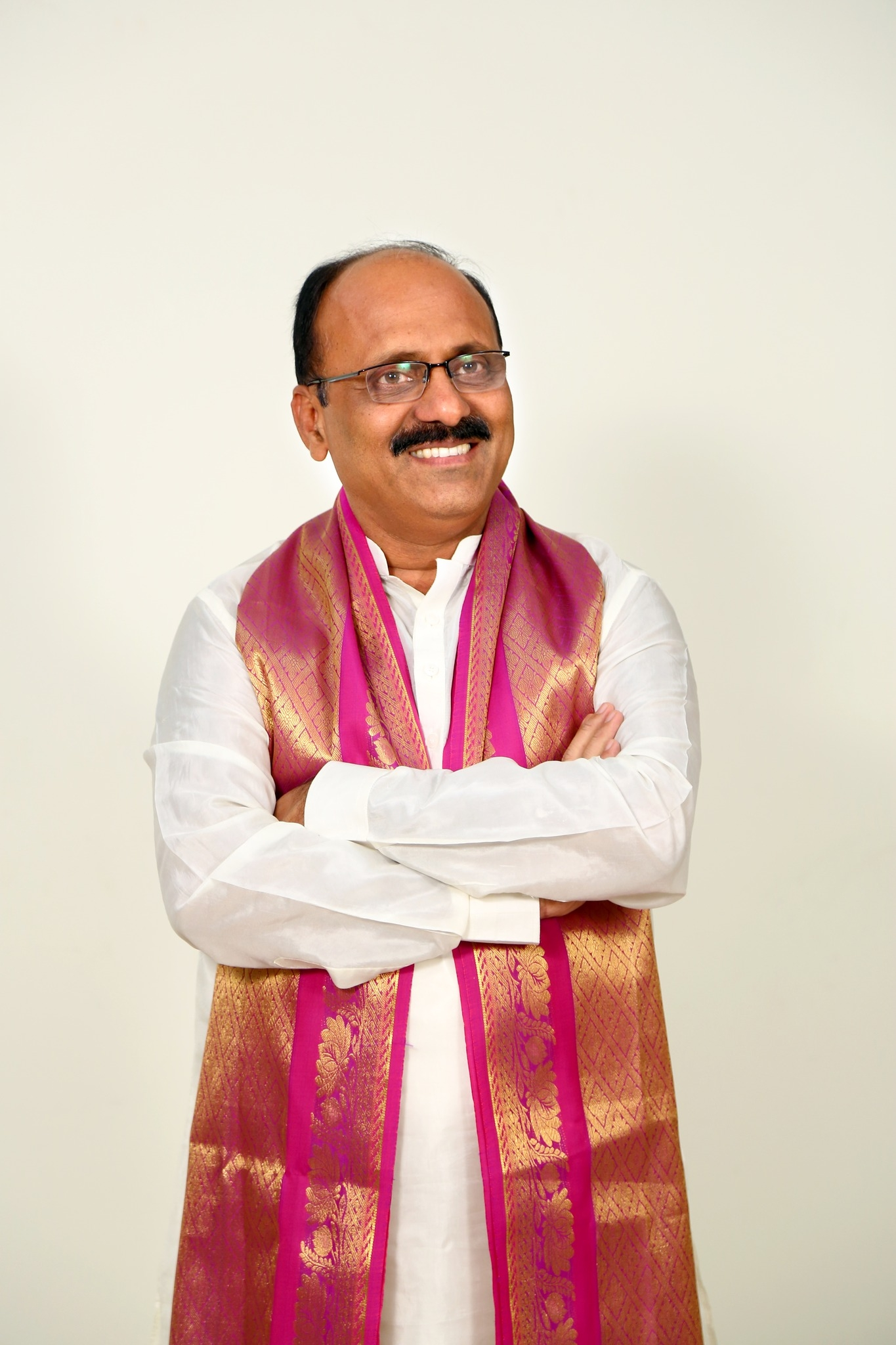

Member of the Andhra Pradesh Legislative Assembly
- In office 2014–2024
- Preceded by: Akepati Amarnath Reddy
- Succeeded by: Akepati Amarnath Reddy
- Constituency: Rajampet

Personal details
- Born: 1964 (age 61–62) Rajampet, Andhra Pradesh, India
- Party: YSR Congress Party
- Other political affiliations: Telugu Desam Party; Indian National Congress
- Spouse: Sucharitha
- Parent: Meda Ramakrishna Reddy (father)
- Education: Government Degree College, Rajampet
- Occupation: Politician, real estate businessman

Meda Venkata Mallikarjuna Reddy (born 1964) is an Indian politician from Andhra Pradesh. He was an MLA of YSR Congress Party from Rajampet Assembly constituency in Kadapa district. He won the 2019 Andhra Pradesh Legislative Assembly election.

== Early life and education ==
Reddy hails from Rajampet, Kadapa district. His father's name is Ramakrishna Reddy. His Brother Name is Meda Raghunath Reddy. He completed his B.Sc. degree from Government Degree College, Rajampet in 1984. He married Sucharitha. He runs his own real estate business, Meda Constructions private limited.

== Career ==
Reddy started his political career with Indian National Congress. He lost the 2012 by-elections on Congress ticket. Later, he joined Telugu Desam Party and won the 2014 Andhra Pradesh Legislative Assembly election defeating Akepati Amarnath Reddy of YSR Congress Party by a margin of 11,617 votes. Later, he shifted to YSRCP and won the 2019 Andhra Pradesh Legislative Assembly election beating Bathyala Changal Rayudu of Telugu Desam Party by a margin of 35,272 votes.
