= P. V. Midhun Reddy =

Indian politician

P.V. Midhun Reddy

Member of Parliament, Lok Sabha
- Incumbent
- Assumed office 16 May 2014
- Preceded by: Sai Prathap Annayyagari
- Constituency: Rajampeta

Personal details
- Born: P.V. Midhun Reddy; 29 August 1977 (age 48) Pileru, Andhra Pradesh
- Party: YSR Congress Party
- Parent: Peddireddy Ramachandra Reddy
- Education: B.E. (Mechanical), MBA (International Business) Educated at Madras University and Schiller International University, London

Peddireddy Venkata Midhun Reddy, commonly known as P. V. Midhun Reddy, is an Indian politician who is the current Member of Parliament in the 16th Lok Sabha and 17th Lok Sabha from Rajampet constituency. He acts as the panel speaker of Lok Sabha representing the YSR Congress Party and Lok Sabha floor leader.

== Electoral performance ==
He won the 2014 Indian general election on former Union Minister Daggubati Purandeswari of BJP being a YSR Congress Party candidate. In 2019, P. V. Mithun Reddy contested the 2019 Indian general elections from the Rajampet Lok Sabha constituency on YSR Congress Party ticket and won with a thumping majority of 268,284 votes against his closest rival D. K. Satya Prabha of the Telugu Desam Party. He won re-election in 2024 against former Andhra Pradesh Chief Minister Kiran Kumar Reddy of the Bharatiya Janata Party by a margin of 76,000 votes.

== First term 2014–2018 ==
He began his first term as a Member of Parliament on 18 May 2014, and term ended at 20 June 2018. His individual attendance at the Parliament was 53%.

== Second term 2019–2024 ==
He began second term as a Member of Parliament from May 2019.

== Personal details ==
He is the son of a former minister of United Andhra Pradesh, Peddireddy Ramachandra Reddy, who is now serving as a Member of Legislative Assembly of Punganur and has taken oath as the cabinet minister for Panchayati Raj & Rural Development, Mining & Geology on 8 June 2019 of Andhra Pradesh. His paternal uncle P. Dwarakanath Reddy was elected to Andhra Pradesh Legislative Assembly from Thamballapalle in 2019 with highest majority in the Chittoor district. His total assets are ₹ 665.1 million as per his asset's declaration in Election Affidavit 2019.

== Cases & disputes ==
=== 2015 Airport issue ===
On 26 November 2015, he allegedly slapped or assaulted a Station Manager S. Rajasekhar of Air India at Tirupati Airport and a criminal case registered against him on his arrival from Bangkok around 01:30 pm on issuing boarding passes. The Official did not complain immediately but after pursuit by Senior Civil Aviation Officials. Air India Staffer sustained fractures in the Rib cage and spine and was shifted to a private Hospital in Hyderabad. Immigration Officials detained him in Chennai and handed over to AP Police. He along with Co-accused Srikalahasti YSR Congress Party Co-incharge Biyyapu Madhusudhan Reddy was brought from Chennai to Srikalahasti Police Station. The two were produced before a First-class Judicial magistrate, who remanded them in custody for 14 days. Then they moved him to Nellore Sub-Jail. Andhra police had earlier registered a case against him and 19 others including the Chandragiri MLA asked to appear for enquiry. The Police issued arrest warrant and sounded red alert in all Airports in India if he did not turn up for questioning.

=== Cases ===
There were several criminal cases on him under IPC Sections 333, 324, 448, 427, 34, 149, 188, 341, 323.

1. 1 charge related to Voluntarily causing grievous hurt to deter public servant from his duty (IPC Section-333)
2. 1 charge related to Voluntarily causing hurt by dangerous weapons or means (IPC Section-324)
3. 2 charges related to house-trespass (IPC Section-448)
4. 2 charges related to Mischief causing damage to the amount of fifty rupees (IPC Section-427
5. 2 charges related to Acts done by several persons in furtherance of common intention (IPC Section-34
6. 1 charge related to Every member of unlawful assembly guilty of offence committed in prosecution of common object (IPC Section-149)
7. 1 charge related to Disobedience to order duly promulgated by public servant (IPC Section-188)
8. 1 charge related to wrongful restraint (IPC Section-341)
9. 1 charge related to voluntarily causing hurt (IPC Section-323)
