= Rajampet Lok Sabha constituency =

Lok Sabha Constituency in Andhra Pradesh

Coordinates: 17.1°N 81.7°E

Rajampet AP-24
- Lok Sabha constituency
- Interactive Map Outlining Rajampet Lok Sabha constituency

Constituency details
- Country: India
- Region: South India
- State: Andhra Pradesh
- Assembly constituencies: Rajampet; Kodur; Rayachoti; Thamballapalle; Pileru; Madanapalle; Punganur
- Established: 1957
- Total electors: 16,65,702 (2024)
- Reservation: None

Member of Parliament
- 18th Lok Sabha
- Incumbent P. V. Midhun Reddy
- Party: YSRCP
- Alliance: None
- Elected year: 2024

Rajampet Lok Sabha constituency is one of the twenty-five lok sabha constituencies of Andhra Pradesh in India. It comprises 4 assembly segments From Annamayya district and Rajampet, Vontimitta & Siddavatam mandals of Kadapa district,1 assembly from Tirupati district and 1 assembly from Chittoor district .

Most Successful parties from Rajampet Lok Sabha
1. INC (11 Times) (64.7%)
2. YSRCP (3 Times) (17.6%)
3. TDP (2 Times) (11.7%)
4. Swatantra Party (1 time) (6.00%)

== Assembly segments ==
Rajampet Lok Sabha constituency presently comprises the following Legislative Assembly segments:

#	Name	District	Members	Party
125	Rajampeta	YSR Kadapa	Akepati Amarnath Reddy	YSRCP
127	Koduru(SC)	Tirupati	Arava Sreedhar	JSP
128	Rayachoti	Annamayya	Mandipalli Ramprasad Reddy	TDP
162	Thamballapalle	Annamayya	Peddireddy Dwarakanatha Reddy	YSRCP
163	Pileru	Annamayya	Nallari Kishore Kumar Reddy	TDP
164	Madanapalle	Annamayya	Shahjahan Basha	TDP
165	Punganur	Annamayya (partial) Chittoor (partial)	Peddireddy Ramachandra Reddy	YSRCP

125-Rajampet Assembly Constituency

127-Koduru Assembly Constituency

128-Rayachoti Assembly Constituency

162-Thamballapalle Assembly Constituency

163-Pileru Assembly Constituency

164-Madanapalle Assembly Constituency

165-Punganur Assembly Constituency

== Members of Parliament ==
Year	Member	Party
1957	T. N. Viswanatha Reddy	Indian National Congress
1962	C. L. Narasimha Reddy	Swatantra Party
1967	Pothuraju Parthasarthy	Indian National Congress
1971	Pothuraju Parthasarthy	Indian National Congress
1977	Pothuraju Parthasarthy	Indian National Congress
1980	Pothuraju Parthasarthy	Indian National Congress
1984	Palakondrayudu Sugavasi	Telugu Desam Party
1989	Sai Prathap Annayyagari	Indian National Congress
1991	Sai Prathap Annayyagari	Indian National Congress
1996	Sai Prathap Annayyagari	Indian National Congress
1998	Sai Prathap Annayyagari	Indian National Congress
1999	Gunipati Ramaiah	Telugu Desam Party
2004	Sai Prathap Annayyagari	Indian National Congress
2009	Sai Prathap Annayyagari	Indian National Congress
2014	P. V. Midhun Reddy	YSR Congress Party
2019	P. V. Midhun Reddy	YSR Congress Party
2024	P. V. Midhun Reddy	YSR Congress Party

== Election results ==
=== General election 2024 ===
2024 Indian general elections: Rajampet
Party	Candidate	Votes	%	±%
YSRCP	P. V. Midhun Reddy	644,844	48.93	
BJP	Nallari Kiran Kumar Reddy	568,773	42.67	
INC	S. K. Basheed	53,300	4.19	
NOTA	None of the above	11,400	0.86	
Majority		76,071	5.77	
Turnout		13,37,920	80.24	
YSRCP hold		Swing		

=== General election 2019 ===
General Election, 2019: Rajampet
Party	Candidate	Votes	%	±%
YSRCP	P. V. Midhun Reddy	702,211	57.27	
TDP	D A Satya Prabha	433,927	35.39	
JSP	Syed Mukarram	33,986	2.77	
NOTA	None of the above	21,339	1.74	
Majority		268,284		
Turnout		12,24,354	79.15	
Registered electors		15,46,938		
YSRCP hold		Swing		

=== General election 2014 ===
General Election, 2014: Rajampet
Party	Candidate	Votes	%	±%
YSRCP	P. V. Midhun Reddy	601,752	51.95	
BJP	Daggubati Purandeswari	426,990	36.86	
JSP	G. Mujeeb Hussain	59,000	8.16	
INC	Sai Prathap Annayyagari	29,332	2.53	−42.05
NOTA	None of the Above	7,116	0.61	
Majority		174,762	15.09	
Turnout		1,158,317	77.87	+1.95
YSRCP gain from INC		Swing		

=== General election 2009 ===
General Election, 2009: Rajampet
Party	Candidate	Votes	%	±%
INC	Sai Prathap Annayyagari	423,910	42.58	−10.91
TDP	Ramesh Kumar Reddy Reddappagari	313,533	31.49	−10.71
PRP	D. A. Srinivas	180,537	18.13	
Majority		110,377	11.09	
Turnout		995,648	75.92	+6.42
INC hold		Swing		

=== General election 2004 ===
General Election, 2004: Rajampet
Party	Candidate	Votes	%	±%
INC	Sai Prathap Annayyagari	369,797	53.49	+8.84
TDP	Gunipati Ramaiah	291,712	42.20	−6.56
Independent	Md Azam Shaik Haji	11,919	1.72	
TRS	Ashoka Rao Peechara	11,247	1.63	
JP	Mukka Narasimha Reddy	6,654	0.96	
Majority		78,085	11.29	
Turnout		691,329	69.50	−0.30
INC gain from TDP		Swing		

=== General election 1999 ===
General Election, 1999: Rajampet
Party	Candidate	Votes	%	±%
TDP	Gunipati Ramaiah	322,107	48.76	+11.31
INC	Sai Prathap Annayyagari	294,937	44.65	−0.70
Majority		27,170	4.11	
Turnout		660,558	69.80	+6.44
TDP gain from INC		Swing		

=== General election 1998 ===
General Election, 1998: Rajampet
Party	Candidate	Votes	%	±%
INC	Sai Prathap Annayyagari	274,889	45.35	−3.07
TDP	Gunipati Ramaiah	226,993	37.45	−2.27
BJP	Harinath Reddy	94,311	15.56	
Majority		47,896	7.90	
Turnout		606,110	63.36	+4.50
INC hold		Swing		

=== General election 1996 ===
General Election, 1996: Rajampet
Party	Candidate	Votes	%	±%
INC	Sai Prathap Annayyagari	280,557	48.42	−9.52
TDP	Pothuraju Prathap	230,165	39.72	+10.70
Majority		50,392	8.70	
Turnout		579,437	58.86	−0.37
INC hold		Swing		

=== General election 1991 ===
General Election, 1991: Rajampet
Party	Candidate	Votes	%	±%
INC	Sai Prathap Annayyagari	325,107	57.94	+6.01
TDP	Palakondrayudu Sugavasi	162,813	29.02	−17.05
Majority		162,294	28.92	
Turnout		561,068	59.23	−10.17
INC hold		Swing		

=== General election 1989 ===
General Election, 1989: Rajampet
Party	Candidate	Votes	%	±%
INC	Sai Prathap Annayyagari	340,796	51.93	+15.29
TDP	C Ramachandraiah	302,373	46.07	−14.30
Majority		38,423	5.86	
Turnout		656,285	69.40	+5.84
INC gain from TDP		Swing		

=== 1984 ===
1984 Indian general election in Andhra Pradesh: Rajampet
Party	Candidate	Votes	%	±%
TDP	Palakondrayudu Sugavasi	298,060	60.37	
INC	A. Sai Prathap	180,913	36.64	
Majority		117,147	23.73	
Turnout		502,894	64.74	
TDP gain from INC		Swing		

=== 1980 ===
1980 Indian general election in Andhra Pradesh: Rajampet
Party	Candidate	Votes	%	±%
INC(I)	P. Parthasarathy	189,311	52.51	
INC(U)	Rathnasabapathy Bandaru	147,910	41.02	
Majority		41,401	11.49	
Turnout		367,287	51.69	
INC(I) gain from INC		Swing		

=== 1977 ===
1977 Indian general election in Andhra Pradesh: Rajampet
Party	Candidate	Votes	%	±%
INC	Pothuraju Parthasarathi	233,844	54.58	
JP	P. Thimma Reddy	179,293	41.85	
IND	Sangaraju Seshagiri Rao	10,034	2.34	
IND	Devallappalli Venkata Subba Reddy	5,272	1.23	
Majority		54,551	12.73	
Turnout		442,481	66.36	
INC hold		Swing		

=== 1971 ===
1971 Indian general election in Andhra Pradesh: Rajampet
Party	Candidate	Votes	%	±%
INC	Parthasarathi Pothuraju	243,603	72.97	
INC(O)	Yesoda Reddy	65,735	19.69	
IND	Nageseshagiri Rao	12,467	3.73	
IND	Chinthala Krishnappa	12,028	3.60	
Majority		177,868	53.28	
Turnout		342,401	62.35	
INC hold		Swing		

=== 1967 ===
1967 Indian general election in Andhra Pradesh: Rajampet
Party	Candidate	Votes	%	±%
INC	P. Parthasarathy	189,874	52.62	
SWA	C. L. N. Reddy	123,325	34.18	
IND	S. Subbanna	29,753	8.25	
IND	S. S. Peer	17,889	4.96	
Majority		66,549	18.44	
Turnout		374,210	72.11	
INC gain from SWA		Swing		

=== 1962 ===
1962 Indian general election in Andhra Pradesh: Rajampet
Party	Candidate	Votes	%	±%
SWA	C. L. Narasimha Reddy	155,017	52.95	
INC	T. N. Viswanatha Reddy	137,752	47.05	
Majority		17,265	5.90	
Turnout		301,705	68.17	
SWA gain from INC		Swing		

== See also ==
- Chittoor district
- Bobbili Lok Sabha constituency
- List of constituencies of the Lok Sabha
