= List of ministers of youth and sports of Andhra Pradesh =

Head of the Ministry of Youth & Sports of the Government of Andhra Pradesh

Minister of Youth and Sports
- Yuvajana mariyu Krīḍala Śākha Mantrī
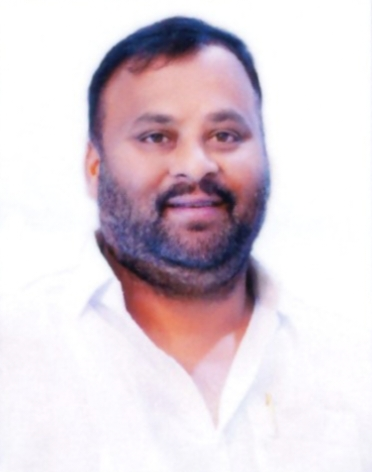
- Incumbent; Mandipalli Ramprasad Reddy since 12 June 2024
- Department of Youth and Sports
- Member of: Andha Pradesh Cabinet
- Reports to: Governor of Andhra Pradesh; Chief Minister of Andhra Pradesh; Andhra Pradesh Legislature
- Appointer: Governor of Andhra Pradesh on the advice of the chief minister of Andhra Pradesh
- Inaugural holder: Kinjarapu Atchannaidu
- Formation: 8 June 2014
- Website: Official website

The minister for youth and sports (or minister of youth advancement) is the head of the Department of Youth & Sports in the Government of Andhra Pradesh.

The incumbent minister for youth & sports is Mandipalli Ramprasad Reddy from the Telugu Desam Party.

== List of ministers ==
#	Portrait	Minister (Lifespan) Constituency	Term of office			Election (Term)	Party	Ministry	Chief Minister	Ref.
#	Portrait	Minister (Lifespan) Constituency	Term start	Term end	Duration	Election (Term)	Party	Ministry	Chief Minister	Ref.
1		Kinjarapu Atchannaidu (born 1969); MLA for Tekkali	8 June 2014	1 April 2017	2 years, 297 days	2014 (14th)	Telugu Desam Party	Naidu III	N. Chandrababu Naidu	
2		Kollu Ravindra (born 1973); MLA for Machilipatnam	2 April 2017	29 May 2019	2 years, 57 days	2014 (14th)	Telugu Desam Party	Naidu III	N. Chandrababu Naidu	
3		Muttamsetti Srinivasa Rao (born 1967); MLA for Bheemili	30 May 2019	7 April 2022	2 years, 312 days	2019 (15th)	YSR Congress Party	Jagan	Y. S. Jagan Mohan Reddy	
4		R. K. Roja (born 1972); MLA for Nagari	11 April 2022	11 June 2024	2 years, 61 days	2019 (15th)	YSR Congress Party	Jagan	Y. S. Jagan Mohan Reddy	
5		Mandipalli Ramprasad Reddy (born 1982); MLA for Rayachoti	12 June 2024	Incumbent	2 years, 87 days	2024 (16th)	Telugu Desam Party	Naidu IV	N. Chandrababu Naidu	
