= RYK =

Ryk (born 1989) is a German singer-songwriter.

RYK or Ryk may refer to:

== Places ==
- Rahim Yar Khan, Punjab, Pakistan
  - Shaikh Zayed International Airport (IATA:RYK)

== Other uses ==
- Rajiv Yuva Kiranalu, an Indian employment programme
- Related to receptor tyrosine kinase, a mammalian gene and protein
- Ryk, cognate of the German word reich in Afrikaans and Frisian

== People with the surname Ryk ==
- Kiera Van Ryk (born 1999), Canadian volleyball player

== People with the given name Ryk ==
- Ryk E. Spoor, American science fiction author
- Ryk Neethling (born 1977), South African swimmer
- Ryk Tulbagh (1699–1771), governor of the Dutch Cape Colony
- Ryk van Schoor (1921–2009), South African rugby player
