= Bandaru Ratnasabhapathi =

Indian former politician

Member of the Andhra Pradesh Legislative Assembly
- In office 1967–1978
- Preceded by: Kondur Marareddi
- Succeeded by: Konduru Prabhavatamma
- Constituency: Rajampet
- In office 1985–1989
- Preceded by: Konduru Prabhavatamma
- Succeeded by: Kasireddi Madan Mohan Reddy

Personal details
- Party: Independent (1967–1972; 1978–1985); Swatantra Party (1972–1978); Telugu Desam Party (after 1985)

Bandaru Ratnasabhapathi was an Indian politician who represented the Rajampet Assembly constituency in the Andhra Pradesh Legislative Assembly. He was first elected in the 1967 Andhra Pradesh Legislative Assembly election as an independent candidate and in 1972 as a candidate for the Swatantra Party. He lost in the 1978 Andhra Pradesh Legislative Assembly election, again running as an independent, to Konduru Prabhavatamma, and again in 1983. Ratnasabhapathu returned as an MLA after the 1985 Andhra Pradesh Legislative Assembly election as a member of the Telugu Desam Party.
