= Arava Sreedhar =

Indian politician (born 1997)

Member of Legislative Assembly Andhra Pradesh
- Incumbent
- Assumed office 4 June 2024
- Preceded by: Koramutla Srinivasulu
- Succeeded by: Vacant
- Constituency: Kodur

Personal details
- Party: Janasena Party

Arava Sreedhar (born 1997) is an Indian politician from Andhra Pradesh. He is an MLA from Kodur Assembly constituency in Tirupati district from 4 June 2024 . He represents Jana Sena Party. He won the 2024 Andhra Pradesh Legislative Assembly election where JSP was part of an alliance with TDP and BJP.

== Early life and education ==
Sreedhar is from Kodur, in the present Tirupati district. His father Arava Venkataiah is a farmer. He completed his B.Tech. at Rajiv Gandhi Memorial College of Engineering, Nandyal.

== Political career ==
Sreedhar won the 2024 Andhra Pradesh Legislative Assembly election from Kodur Assembly constituency representing Jana Sena Party. He polled 78,594 votes and defeated three time MLA Koramutla Srinivasulu of YSR Congress Party by a margin of 11,101. He joined Jana Sena Party only a few days before his nomination was announced by party chief Pawan Kalyan on 4 April 2024 but he kept the confidence of his leader and won the seat and later on 12 November 2024 was appointed whip.

In May 2026, Sreedhar resigned from the post of government whip after meeting Jana Sena Party chief Pawan Kalyan.
