= Rajampet Assembly constituency =

Constituency of the Andhra Pradesh Legislative Assembly, India

Coordinates: 14.19°N 79.16°E

Rajampet
- Constituency No. 125 for the Andhra Pradesh Legislative Assembly
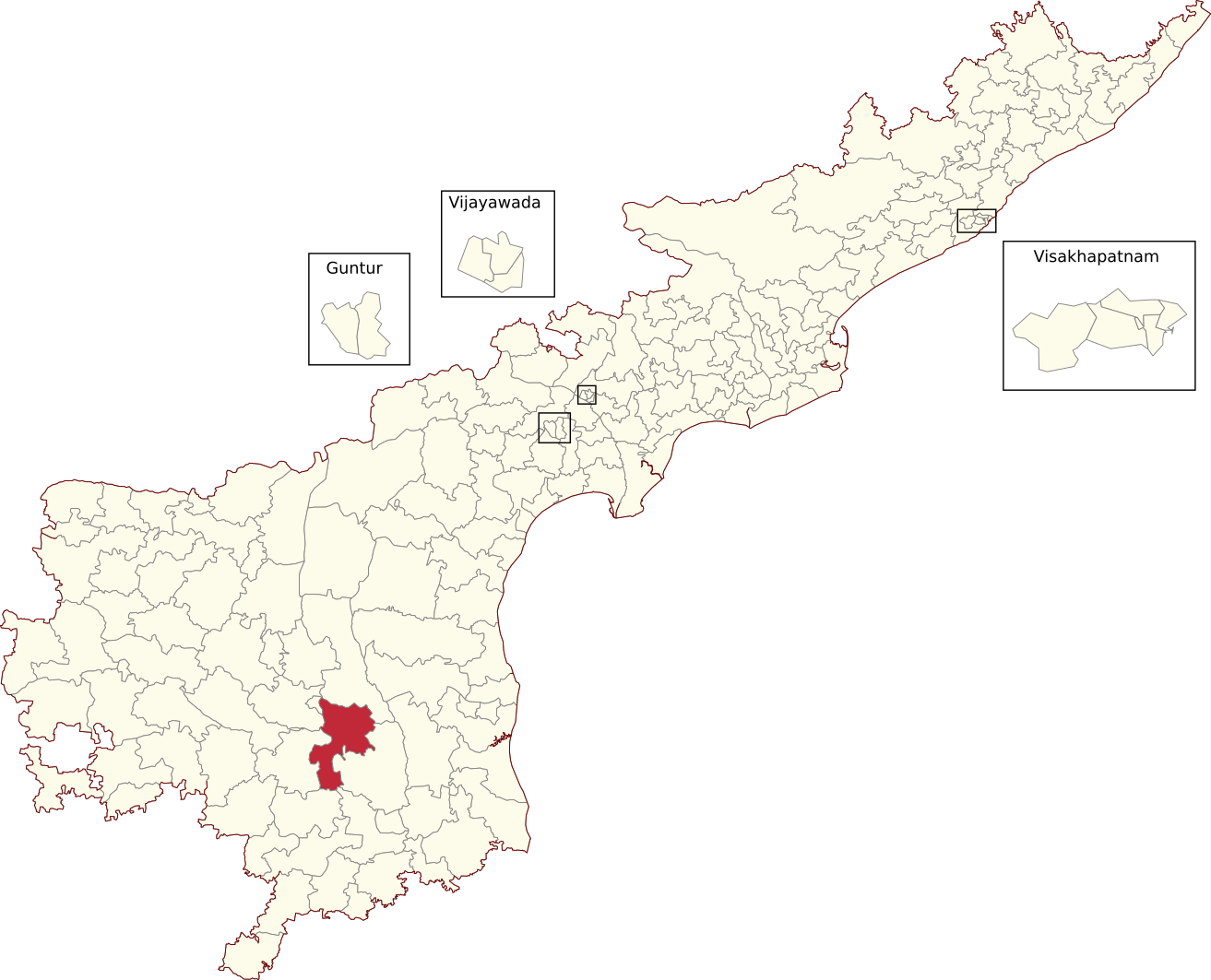
- Location of Rajampet Assembly constituency within Andhra Pradesh

Constituency details
- Country: India
- Region: South India
- State: Andhra Pradesh
- District: Kadapa
- Lok Sabha constituency: Rajampet
- Established: 1951
- Total electors: 222,274
- Reservation: None

Member of Legislative Assembly
- 16th Andhra Pradesh Legislative Assembly
- Incumbent Akepati Amarnath Reddy
- Party: YSRCP
- Elected year: 2024

Rajampet Assembly constituency is a constituency in Kadapa district of Andhra Pradesh that elects representatives to the Andhra Pradesh Legislative Assembly in India. It is one of the seven assembly segments in Rajampet Lok Sabha constituency.

Akepati Amarnath Reddy is the current MLA of the constituency, having won the 2024 Andhra Pradesh Legislative Assembly Elections from YSR Congress Party. As of 25 March 2019, there are a total of 222,274 electors in the constituency. The constituency was established in 1951, as per the Delimitation Orders (1951).

== Mandals ==
Mandal
Siddavatam
Vontimitta
Nandalur
Rajampet
Veeraballe
T Sundupalli

== Members of the Legislative Assembly ==
Year	Member	Political party
1952	Panjam Narasimha Reddy	Communist Party of India
1955	Pothuraju Parthasarathi	Indian National Congress
1962	Kondur Marareddi	Swatantra Party
1967	Bandaru Ratnasabhapathi	Independent
1972	Bandaru Ratnasabhapathi	Swatantra Party
1978	Konduru Prabhavatamma	Indian National Congress
1983	Konduru Prabhavatamma	Indian National Congress
1985	Bandaru Ratnasabhapathi	Telugu Desam Party
1989	Kasireddi Madhan Mohan Reddy	Indian National Congress
1994	Brahmaiah Pasupuleti	Telugu Desam Party
1999	Brahmaiah Pasupuleti	Telugu Desam Party
2004	Konduru Prabhavatamma	Indian National Congress
2009	Akepati Amarnath Reddy	Indian National Congress
2012	Akepati Amarnath Reddy	YSR Congress Party
2014	Meda Venkata Mallikarjuna Reddy	Telugu Desam Party
2019	Meda Venkata Mallikarjuna Reddy	YSR Congress Party
2024	Akepati Amarnath Reddy	YSR Congress Party

== Election results ==
=== 2024 ===
2024 Andhra Pradesh Legislative Assembly election: Rajampet
Party	Candidate	Votes	%	±%
YSRCP	Akepati Amarnath Reddy	92,609	50.17	▼7.62
TDP	Sugavasi Subrahmanyam	85,593	46.38	▲9.99
CPI	Bhukya Viswanatha Naik	1,009	0.54	
NOTA	None Of The Above	1,617	0.87	▲0.00
Majority		7,016	3.80	
Turnout		184,557	76.05	▲1.94
YSRCP hold		Swing		

=== 2019 ===
2019 Andhra Pradesh Legislative Assembly election: Rajampet
Party	Candidate	Votes	%	±%
YSRCP	Meda Venkata Mallikarjuna Reddy	95,266	57.79	▲14.08
TDP	Bathyala Changal Rayudu	59,994	36.39	▼14.35
INC	Poola Bhaskar	3,081	1.87	
JSP	Pathipati Kusuma Kumari	2,376	1.44	new
NOTA	None Of The Above	1,448	0.87	
Majority		35,272	15.93	
Turnout		164,846	74.11	▼4.75
YSRCP gain from TDP		Swing		

=== 2014 ===
2014 Andhra Pradesh Legislative Assembly election: Rajampet
Party	Candidate	Votes	%	±%
TDP	Meda Venkata Mallikarjuna Reddy	83,884	50.74	
YSRCP	Akepati Amarnath Reddy	72,267	43.71	
Majority		11,617	7.03	
Turnout		209,909	78.76	+4.19
TDP gain from YSRCP		Swing		

=== 2012 ===
2012 Andhra Pradesh Legislative Assembly by-election: Rajampet
Party	Candidate	Votes	%	±%
YSRCP	Akepati Amarnath Reddy	76,951	52.49	
INC	Meda Venkata Mallikarjuna Reddy	38,732	26.42	
TDP	Pasupuleti Brahmaiah	21,417	14.61	
Majority		38,219	26.17	
Turnout		146,615		
YSRCP gain from INC		Swing		

=== 2009 ===
2009 Andhra Pradesh Legislative Assembly election: Rajampet
Party	Candidate	Votes	%	±%
INC	Akepati Amarnath Reddy	60,397	43.67	▼17.15
TDP	Kasireddy Madan Mohan Reddy	48,055	34.74	▼0.09
PRP	Gunipati Ramaiah	21,499	15.54	new
Majority		12,342	8.93	
Turnout		138,314	74.57	▲4.31
INC hold		Swing		

=== 2004 ===
2004 Andhra Pradesh Legislative Assembly election: Rajampet
Party	Candidate	Votes	%	±%
INC	Konduru Prabhavatamma	54,246	61.82	▲26.69
TDP	Brahmaiah Pasupuleti	30,579	34.85	▼1.16
Majority		23,667	26.97	
Turnout		87,747	70.26	▲3.16
INC gain from TDP		Swing		

=== 1999 ===
1999 Andhra Pradesh Legislative Assembly election: Rajampet
Party	Candidate	Votes	%	±%
TDP	Brahmaiah Pasupuleti	28,184	36.00	▼25.31
INC	Konduru Prabhavatamma	27,495	35.12	▲0.11
Independent	Kasireddy Madan Mohan Reddy	21,461	27.41	
Majority		689	0.88	
Turnout		78,277	67.1	▼2.2
TDP hold		Swing		

=== 1994 ===
1994 Andhra Pradesh Legislative Assembly election: Rajampet
Party	Candidate	Votes	%	±%
TDP	Brahmaiah Pasupuleti	54,438	61.31	▲17.49
INC	Kasireddy Madan Mohan Reddy	31,085	35.01	▼20.19
Majority		23,353	26.30	
Turnout		88,791	69.3	▲0.8
TDP gain from INC		Swing		

=== 1989 ===
1989 Andhra Pradesh Legislative Assembly election: Rajampet
Party	Candidate	Votes	%	±%
INC	Kasireddy Madan Mohan Reddy	50,969	55.20	▲8.99
TDP	Konduru Prabhavatamma	40,459	43.82	▼8.37
Majority		10,510	11.4	
Turnout		92,322	68.5	▼5.1
INC gain from TDP		Swing		

=== 1985 ===
1985 Andhra Pradesh Legislative Assembly election: Rajampet
Party	Candidate	Votes	%	±%
TDP	Bandaru Ratnasabhapathi	46,568	52.19	▲3.77
INC	Kasireddy Madan Mohan Reddy	41,234	46.21	▼2.78
Majority		5,331	6.0	
Turnout		89,226	73.6	▼2.5
TDP gain from INC		Swing		

=== 1983 ===
1983 Andhra Pradesh Legislative Assembly election: Rajampet
Party	Candidate	Votes	%	±%
INC	Konduru Prabhavatamma	41,466	48.99	▲4.71
TDP	Bandaru Ratnasabhapathi	40,963	48.42	new
Majority		503	0.62	
Turnout		84,590	76.1	▼2.9
INC hold		Swing		

=== 1978 ===
1978 Andhra Pradesh Legislative Assembly election: Rajampet
Party	Candidate	Votes	%	±%
INC	Konduru Prabhavatamma	36,854	44.28	
Independent	Bandaru Ratnasabhapathi	27,032	32.48	
INC(I)	Sriram Venkata Subramanyan	11,192	13.45	
JP	Syed Moosa	7,573	9.1	new
Majority		9,822	11.8	
Turnout		83,211	79.0	
INC gain from SWA		Swing		

=== 1952 ===
1952 Madras State Legislative Assembly election: Rajampet
Party	Candidate	Votes	%	±%
CPI	Panjam Narasimha Reddy	21,125	18.98%	
Socialist Party (India)	Bandam Ratnasabapathi Setti	17,572	15.79%	
INC	P. Parthasarathi	16,519	14.84%	
KLP	V. Hanumantha Naidu	16,148	14.51%	
INC	Pala Venkatasubbayya	15,618	14.03%	
Independent	Meda Ramachandra Reddy	8,489	7.63%	
Independent	Beri Pitchaiah	7,256	6.52%	
Independent	Venkatachala Gangi Reddy	4,515	4.06%	
RPI	Y. Penchaliah	4,060	3.65%	
Margin of victory		3,553	3.19%	
Turnout		1,11,302	85.08%	
Registered electors		1,30,828		
CPI win (new seat)				

== See also ==
- List of constituencies of Andhra Pradesh Vidhan Sabha
