= Valmikipuram =

Perapuram pusapatirega
- VZM
- Interactive map of Perapuram
- Location in Andhra Pradesh, India
- Coordinates: 13.6500°N 78.6333°E
- Country: India
- State: Andhra Pradesh
- District: Annamayya
- Mandal: Valmikipuram

Population (2011)
  - Total: 17,535

Languages
  - Official: Telugu
- Time zone: UTC+5:30 (IST)
- Postal code: 517299
- Nearest Cities: Madanapalle, Pileru
- Assembly Constituency: Pileru
- Lok Sabha Constituency: Rajampeta

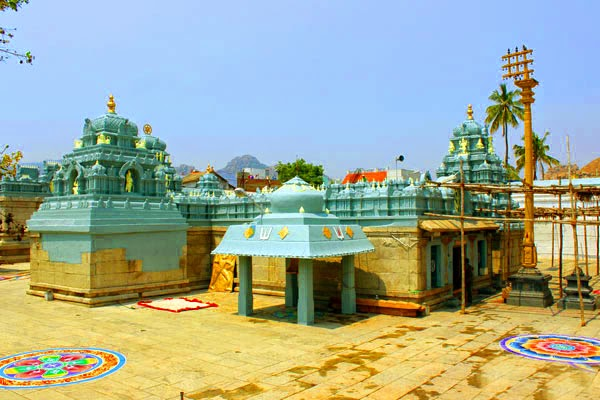
Image

Valmikipuram (also known as Vayalpadu and Vayalpad) is a census Town in Annamayya district of the Indian state of Andhra Pradesh. It is the mandal headquarters. The town is known for the "Sri Pattabhi Rama temple", built by lord Jambavantha in Treta Yuga. Valmiki, the author of great epic Ramayana 'taposthan'(did tapas here). Kodanda Ramaylam was built by Lord Jambavantha in Treta Yuga as a mark of his respect towards Lord Sri Rama. Uniqueness of this temple is that here Lord Sri Rama will be seen in the coronation ceremony posture as presiding deity flanked by His beloved Goddess Sita Devi and also by his brothers Laxmana, Bharatha, Shatrughna, and Lord Anjaneya. Here SriRama also called as ‘Pratapa Raama’ as he is holding sword. There is also a hill here called 'Veeranna Konda' with the shrine of Veerabhadra. It is said that the sage Valmiki sat on this hill while writing The Ramayana. Another uniqueness of this Temple Idol in this Temple is facing North and Locals says that it is the only Temple in Andhra Pradesh with North facing. Tallapaka Ananmacharya penned as many as 21 ‘sankeertanas’ in praise of the Pattabhirama Swamy deity here. Kodanda Rama Swamy Temple is holding 500 years of history, this temple well managed in Krishna Deva Raya's period and Chola's period. In 1997, TTD (Tirumala tirupati Devasthanams) adopted and from then temple has seen drastic growth.

== Geography ==
Vayalpad is located at 13.6500°N 78.6333°E. It has an average elevation of 611 meters (2007 feet). Amaravati is the state capital for Valmikipuram Town. It is located around 418.7 kilometers away from Valmikipuram. The other nearest state capital from Valmikipuram is Bangalore and its distance is 149 km. The other surrounding state capitals are Bangalore 149 km., Chennai 227 km., Pondicherry 279 km Valmikipuram Sun rise time Valmikipuram Town is located in the UTC 5.30 time zone and it follows Indian standard time (IST). Valmikipuram sun rise time varies 13 minutes from IST. The vehicle driving side in Valmikipuram is left, all vehicles should take left side during driving. Valmikipuram people are using its national currency which is Indian Rupee and its international currency code is INR. Valmikipuram phones and mobiles can be accessed by adding the India country dialing code +91 from abroad.

Vayalpad is located at 13.55°N 78.50°E.

Climate data for Vayalpad
Month	Jan	Feb	Mar	Apr	May	Jun	Jul	Aug	Sep	Oct	Nov	Dec	Year
Mean daily maximum °C (°F)	27.3 (81.1)	30.2 (86.4)	33.4 (92.1)	34.9 (94.8)	35 (95)	32.1 (89.8)	30.2 (86.4)	30.1 (86.2)	29.9 (85.8)	28.6 (83.5)	26.8 (80.2)	25.7 (78.3)	30.4 (86.6)
Mean daily minimum °C (°F)	16.5 (61.7)	17.4 (63.3)	19.4 (66.9)	22.2 (72.0)	23.6 (74.5)	22.8 (73.0)	21.8 (71.2)	21.8 (71.2)	21.2 (70.2)	20.2 (68.4)	17.8 (64.0)	15.6 (60.1)	20.0 (68.0)
Average precipitation mm (inches)	4 (0.2)	2 (0.1)	3 (0.1)	28 (1.1)	61 (2.4)	51 (2.0)	81 (3.2)	73 (2.9)	111 (4.4)	143 (5.6)	54 (2.1)	32 (1.3)	643 (25.4)

Source : Climate

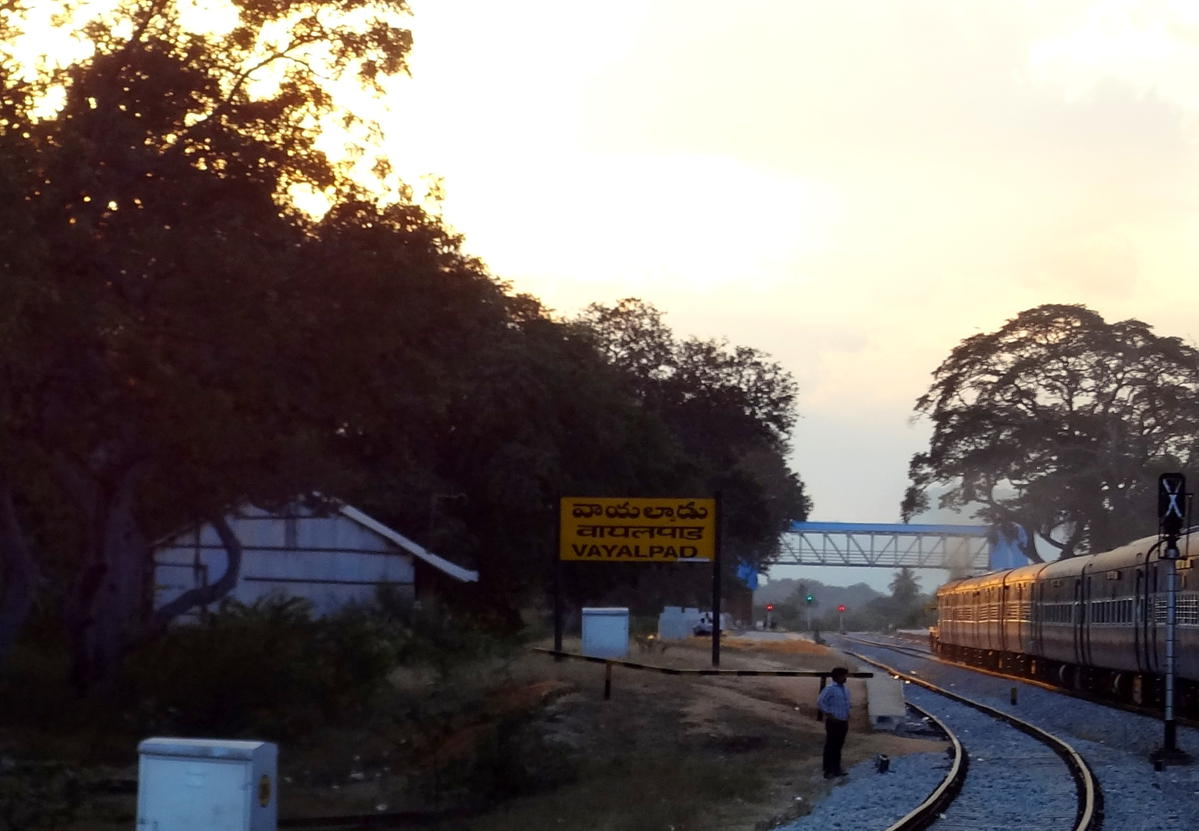
