= Y. Adinarayana Reddy =

Indian politician and philanthropist

Yerrapureddy Adinarayana Reddy

Member of Parliament, Rajya Sabha
- In office 1964-1970
- Constituency: Andhra Pradesh
- In office 1982-1988
- Constituency: Andhra Pradesh

Member of the Legislative Assembly Andhra Pradesh
- In office 1952–1954
- Constituency: Madras Legislative Assembly
- In office 1955–1962
- Constituency: Rayachoti, Andhra Pradesh

Andhra Pradesh Legislative Council
- In office 1974–1980
- Constituency: Andhra Pradesh

Personal details
- Born: 15 October 1916 T.Sundupalle, Kadapa district, Madras Presidency, British India
- Died: 8 June 2002 Hyderabad
- Party: Indian National Congress
- Spouse: Y. Basamma
- Children: 4 sons and 3 daughters

Yerrapureddy Adinarayana Reddy (15 October 1916 – 8 June 2002) was an Indian freedom fighter and politician. He organized the Individual Satyagraha Movement 1940 in the District and suffered three months in the Vellore Central Jail. During the Quit India Movement, he worked underground and later he was arrested and detained from 1942 to 1944 in the Vellore and Thanjavur Jails. He was a two term Member of Parliament, representing Andhra Pradesh in the Rajya Sabha the upper house of India's Parliament as a member of the Indian National Congress. He even served as Member of the Legislative Assembly of the earlier Madras Legislative Assembly and Andhra Pradesh Legislative Assembly from Rayachoti. He was also elected as MLC by Andhra Pradesh Legislative Council.

== Personal life ==
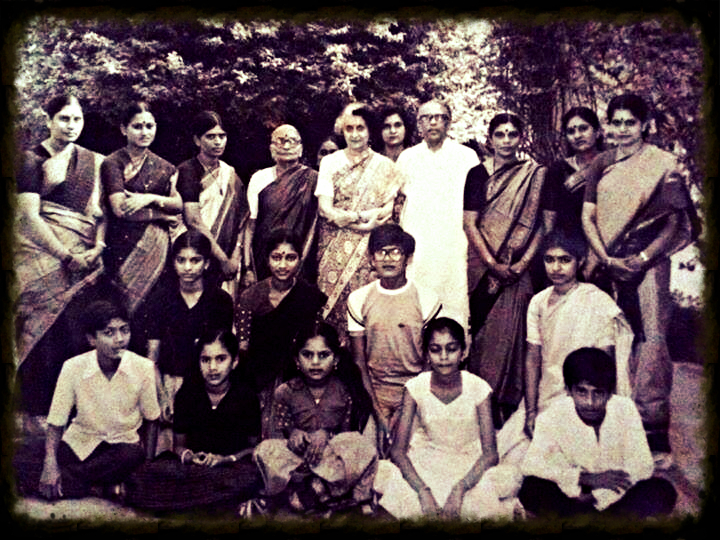
Adinarayana Reddy with Prime Minister Indira Gandhi and his Family Members

Yerrapureddy Adinarayana Reddy was born on 15 October 1916 in T.Sundupalle in the Kadapa district of Andhra Pradesh. He completed his B.A. from Madras University and was an Agriculturist. Being born into a Hindu family as eldest son of Y Nagi Reddy, Adinarayana Reddy was married to Y. Basamma. They had 4 sons and 3 daughters - Y. Ravindra Reddy (Ex-Chairman APGENCO), Shivaram Reddy, Dr Yerukala Reddy, Anand Reddy, Arundhati, Savithri Allapureddy and Sridevi. He is related to many political personalities in the State. Then Chief Minister of Andhra Pradesh Kasu Brahmananda Reddy is his brother-in-law. Prestigious Pincha Project Dam on Penna River tributary is his brain child. Later in 2004 then Chief Minister of Andhra Pradesh State Y S Rajashekar Reddy renamed it as Adinarayana Reddy Pincha Project as a tribute.

== Freedom struggle ==
Adinarayana Reddy organized the Individual Satyagraha Movement from 1940 - 41 in the District as the D.C.C. President; he was fined Rs. 500/- and suffered three months S.I. from May 1941 in the Vellore Central Jail. He exhorted the people throughout the District to organize and fight the British by any means at their disposal during the Quit India Movement, as per the famous Andhra P.C.C. circular of 1942. He worked underground before he was arrested and detained from December 1942 to December 1944 in the Vellore and Thanjavur Jails. He played a major role in formation of Andhra Pradesh State from Madras State. He was Editor of a Telugu weekly at Cuddapah ‘Azad Hind’. He was awarded the Tamrapatra in 1974, an award for outstanding contribution to Indian Freedom Struggle by The President of India Shankar Dayal Sharma.

== Political life ==
He worked as District Congress Committee President, Kadapa district from 1940-49. When the Food Crisis struck in 1952, he invited Prime Minister Jawaharlal Nehru and C. Rajagopalachari to Rayachoti to explain the plight of the people during the drought and see to it that relief programs were put in place. He had close ties with many Indian National Congress leaders, including the then Prime Minister Jawaharlal Nehru, Lal Bahadur Shastri, Indira Gandhi and Sarvepalli Radhakrishnan. Later In 1969, he was selected as a Member of AICC. He was considered a part of the power center in the Andhra Pradesh Congress party due to his proximity to the then Prime Minister, Indira Gandhi.

During 1965-69 he worked as President of District Co-operative Central Bank, Andhra Pradesh. He served as Director of Andhra Pradesh State Cooperative Bank and Andhra Pradesh State Cooperative Marketing Federation for three years. He was elected as Member of the Legislative Assembly from Rayachoti in erstwhile Madras State from 1952 to 1954 and again in 1954 to 1962 from Rayachoti, Andhra Pradesh. He was elected twice as a Member of Parliament, Rajya Sabha from Andhra Pradesh in 1964 and 1982. In June 1974, he was elected as a member of the Andhra Pradesh Legislative Council.

In 1986 he represented as a member from India in the United Nations General Assembly held in United States of America.

== Death & Honours ==
On June 8, 2002, he had taken his last breath at his residence in Hyderabad.

On 13th Oct. 2021, as part of the Azadi Ka Amrut Mahotsav Department of Posts released a Special Cover/Stamp on Shri Y Adinarayana Reddy - Unsung hero of our freedom movement. The Special Cover was released by Shri Dharmendra Pradhan, Minister of Education, Skill Development & Entrepreneurship and Shri Ashwini Vaishnaw, Minister of Communications, Railways, and IT. They recollected the struggle of Shri Adinarayana Reddy and reminded the present generation of their duties to upkeep the values and path shown by these eminent personalities.
