= Amma Hastham =

Amman Hastham is a welfare program by the Government of Andhra Pradesh that provides nine essential 9 food commodities every month at a subsidised rate of Rs. 185. It benefits 22.5 million people in the state.

== History ==
The scheme was started on Ugadi day in April 2013 by the Chief Minister of Andhra Pradesh, Kiran Kumar Reddy at Visakhapatnam at Apannapalem village.

The scheme costs Rs. 6.60 billion per year.
