= Bangaru Thalli (scheme) =

Bangaru Thalli (lit. 'Golden girl child') is a welfare scheme aimed at supporting girl children, launched by the Government of Andhra Pradesh, India. This initiative seeks to provide financial assistance to families, starting from the birth of a girl until her graduation, with a specific focus on economically disadvantaged households. The scheme is available to families holding a Below Poverty Line (BPL) white ration card.

== History ==
The scheme was introduced on 1 May 2013 by the then Chief Minister of Andhra Pradesh, Kiran Kumar Reddy. Following its launch, the Andhra Pradesh Legislative Assembly passed the AP Bangaru Thalli Girl Child Promotion and Empowerment Act, 2013 on 19 June 2013.

== Scheme details ==
Bangaru Thalli offers a range of financial benefits that support both mothers and daughters at various stages of life. From the moment a woman becomes pregnant, she is entitled to receive ₹1,000 each month until she delivers her baby. Upon the birth of a girl, the family receives ₹2,500 as an immediate financial benefit.

During early childhood, the scheme continues to provide assistance, ensuring that families receive ₹1,500 annually through Anganwadi centers until the child turns five. Once the girl begins her formal education, she is entitled to ₹1,000 upon school admission. Further financial support is provided throughout her schooling years, with annual payments of ₹2,000 from the first to the fifth standard, ₹2,500 from the sixth to the eighth standard, and ₹3,000 for the ninth and tenth standards.

As the girl progresses into higher education, the scheme offers ₹3,500 each year for Intermediate studies, and ₹3,000 per year during her graduation.

== Objectives ==
The overarching goal of the Bangaru Thalli scheme is to foster the holistic development and empowerment of girl children. The scheme seeks to address the societal perception of girls as a burden, thereby promoting gender equality and improving the social status of women. By providing financial incentives at various educational milestones, the scheme aims to encourage families to invest in the education and growth of their daughters. This, in turn, is expected to reduce gender discrimination, contribute to the achievement of the Millennium Development Goals, and harness the potential of women for nation-building.

In addition, the scheme seeks to ensure its continuity through well-defined responsibilities for stakeholders, helping to institutionalize support for girl children and creating a sustainable model for their welfare.

== Scope and entitlements ==
The Bangaru Thalli scheme is designed to benefit all girl children born into economically disadvantaged families, provided they were born on or after 1 May 2013 and possess a White Ration Card. The entitlements include access to public health facilities for safe institutional deliveries, along with pre- and post-natal healthcare and immunization services for mothers and their children.

Furthermore, the scheme guarantees three years of pre-school education through Anganwadi centers, followed by eight years of primary education. Girls are also supported through two years of high school education and two additional years beyond the 10th standard. Upon completing their school education, they are provided with three to four years of college education, and skill training is also offered to equip them for suitable employment.

== Incentives ==
The scheme offers financial incentives as a way to encourage families to ensure their daughters meet educational milestones. For instance, if a girl completes her Intermediate education but discontinues her studies, she is eligible for a payout of ₹50,000. If she completes a degree, the payout increases to ₹1 lakh. These financial incentives are deposited directly into the beneficiary's bank account through electronic transfers, ensuring transparency and minimizing the need for intermediaries. Aadhaar-based biometric authentication is used to verify the identity of beneficiaries and streamline the disbursement process.

== Implementation structure ==
The implementation of Bangaru Thalli is overseen by a State Council chaired by the Chief Minister, with participation from relevant ministers and departmental secretaries. The Women and Child Welfare Department serves as the nodal authority for the scheme. In rural areas, the Society for Elimination of Rural Poverty (SERP) is responsible for implementation, while in urban areas, this task falls to the Mission for Elimination of Poverty in Municipal Areas (MEPMA).

An IT-driven process underpins the administration of the scheme, with a central electronic registry that maintains an online database of beneficiaries. Local authorities, such as Auxiliary Nurse Midwives (ANMs) and Anganwadi Workers (AWWs), play crucial roles in registering pregnant women and reporting the birth of children. Village Organizations (VOs) monitor the progress of each child throughout her schooling, and educational institutions upload beneficiary information to the central database.

== Social audit and budgetary requirements ==
To ensure transparency, all data related to the Bangaru Thalli scheme is made publicly accessible, allowing for social audits that hold the program accountable. The financial aspects of the scheme are also subject to audit, ensuring that the allocated resources are used effectively.

The program is designed to grow in scale over time. In its first year, the budget required to support approximately 8 lakh girls is estimated to be ₹200 crore. As the number of beneficiaries increases, the financial outlay is expected to rise, reaching ₹6,618 crore by the end of the 2034–2035 period.

Through its comprehensive structure, long-term planning, and focus on empowering girls, the Bangaru Thalli scheme aims to create lasting social change by promoting gender equality and improving the lives of women across Andhra Pradesh.

== Sources ==
- https://web.archive.org/web/20140816055822/http://www.allapplicationforms.com/AP-bangarutalli-scheme.html
