= Rayachoty Assembly constituency =

Constituency of the Andhra Pradesh Legislative Assembly, India

Coordinates: 14.05°N 78.75°E

Rayachoty
- Constituency No. 128 for the Andhra Pradesh Legislative Assembly
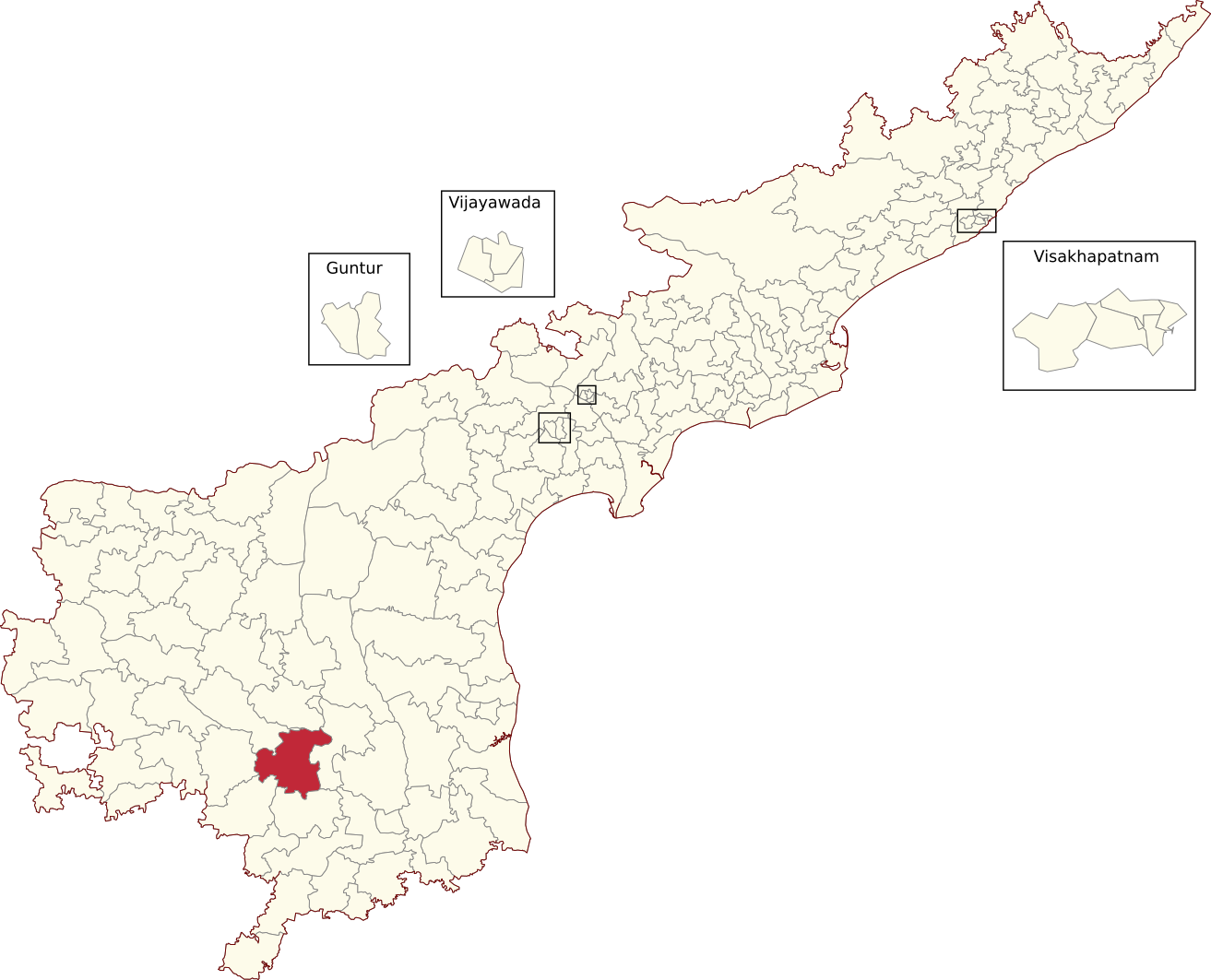
- Location of Rayachoty Assembly constituency within Andhra Pradesh

Constituency details
- Country: India
- Region: South India
- State: Andhra Pradesh
- District: Annamayya
- Lok Sabha constituency: Rajampet
- Established: 1951
- Total electors: 231,637
- Reservation: None

Member of Legislative Assembly
- 16th Andhra Pradesh Legislative Assembly
- Incumbent Mandipalli Ramprasad Reddy
- Party: TDP
- Alliance: NDA
- Elected year: 2024

Rayachoty Assembly constituency is a constituency in Annamayya district of Andhra Pradesh that elects representatives to the Andhra Pradesh Legislative Assembly in India. It is one of the seven assembly segments of Rajampet Lok Sabha constituency.

Mandipalli Ramprasad Reddy is the current MLA of the constituency, having won the 2024 Andhra Pradesh Legislative Assembly election from Telugu Desam Party. As of 25 March 2019, there are a total of 231,637 electors in the constituency. The constituency was established in 1951, as per the Delimitation Orders (1951).

== Mandals ==
The constituency is formed with Six Mandals.

Mandals
Sambepalli
Chinnamandem
Rayachoty
Galiveedu
Lakkireddipalli
Ramapuram

== Members of the Legislative Assembly ==
Year	Member	Political party
1952	Y. Adinarayana Reddy	Kisan Mazdoor Praja Party
1955	Y. Adinarayana Reddy	Indian National Congress
1962	Rachamalla Narayana Reddy	Swatantra Party
1967	M. K. Reddy	Indian National Congress
1972	Habibullah Mahal	Indian National Congress
1978	Palakondrayudu Sugavasi	Janata Party
1983	Palakondrayudu Sugavasi	Independent
1985	Mandipalli Nagi Reddy	Indian National Congress
1989	Mandipalli Nagi Reddy	Indian National Congress
1994	M. Narayana Reddy	Indian National Congress
1999	Sugavasi Palakondrayudu	Telugu Desam Party
2004	Sugavasi Palakondrayudu	Telugu Desam Party
2009	Gadikota Srikanth Reddy	Indian National Congress
2012	Gadikota Srikanth Reddy	YSR Congress Party
2014	Gadikota Srikanth Reddy	YSR Congress Party
2019	Gadikota Srikanth Reddy	YSR Congress Party
2024	Mandipalli Ramprasad Reddy	Telugu Desam Party

== Election results ==
=== 1952 ===
1952 Madras Legislative Assembly election: Rayachoty
Party	Candidate	Votes	%	±%
KMPP	Y. Adinarayana Reddy	24,568	46.52%	
Socialist Party (India)	Gurjala Reddayya Naidu	12,959	24.54%	
INC	Abdul Biram Saheb	7,444	14.09%	14.09%
Independent	Gundlur Mohammad Sayeed	6,418	12.15%	
Independent	Narasupalli Nagireddi	1,426	2.70%	
Margin of victory		11,609	21.98%	
Turnout		52,815	62.23%	
Registered electors		84,877		
KMPP win (new seat)				

=== 2004 ===
2004 Andhra Pradesh Legislative Assembly election: Rayachoty
Party	Candidate	Votes	%	±%
TDP	Palakondrayudu Sugavasi	51,026	50.5	
INC	Sreelatha Minnamreddy	47,782	47.29	
Majority		3,244	3.21	
Turnout		1,01,029	68.06	
Registered electors		1,48,435		
TDP hold		Swing		

=== 2009 ===
2009 Andhra Pradesh Legislative Assembly election: Rayachoty
Party	Candidate	Votes	%	±%
INC	Gadikota Srikanth Reddy	71,901	50.21	
TDP	Palakondrayudu Sugavasi	57,069	39.85	
PRP	Mahaboob Basha Shaik	6,469	4.52	
Majority		14,832	10.36	
Turnout		1,43,194	76.74	
Registered electors		1,86,579		
INC gain from TDP		Swing		

=== By-election 2012 ===
2012 Andhra Pradesh by-elections: Rayachoty
Party	Candidate	Votes	%	±%
YSRCP	Gadikota Srikanth Reddy	90,978	57.15	
TDP	Subramanyam Sugavasi	34,087	21.41	
INC	Mandipalli Ramprasad Reddy	25,344	15.92	
Majority		56,891	35.74	
Turnout		1,59,206	79.51	
Registered electors		2,00,226		
YSRCP gain from INC		Swing		

=== 2014 ===
2014 Andhra Pradesh Legislative Assembly election: Rayachoty
Party	Candidate	Votes	%	±%
YSRCP	Gadikota Srikanth Reddy	96,891	56.39	
TDP	Reddeppagari Ramesh Kumar Reddy	62,109	36.15	
JSP	Mandipalli Ramprasad Reddy	3,272	1.90	
Majority		34,782	20.24	
Turnout		1,71,819	76.23	
Registered electors		2,25,388		
YSRCP hold		Swing		

=== 2019 ===
2019 Andhra Pradesh Legislative Assembly election: Rayachoty
Party	Candidate	Votes	%	±%
YSRCP	Gadikota Srikanth Reddy	98,990	56.94	
TDP	Reddappagari Ramesh Kumar Reddy	66,128	38.04	
INC	Shaik Allabakash	2,615	1.5	
NOTA	None of the above	2,226	1.28	
JSP	S. Hasan Basha	1,480	0.85	
Majority		32,862	18.90	
Turnout		1,73,843	74.98	
Registered electors		2,31,856		
YSRCP hold		Swing		

=== 2024 ===
2024 Andhra Pradesh Legislative Assembly election: Rayachoty
Party	Candidate	Votes	%	±%
TDP	Mandipalli Ramprasad Reddy	95,925	47.99	
YSRCP	Gadikota Srikanth Reddy	93,430	46.74	
INC	Shaik Allabakash	5,571	2.79	
NOTA	None of the above	1,592	0.8	
Majority		2,495	1.25	
Turnout		1,99,901	77.39	
TDP gain from YSRCP		Swing		

== See also ==
- List of constituencies of the Andhra Pradesh Legislative Assembly
- Kadapa district
