= Annayyagari Sai Prathap =

Indian politician

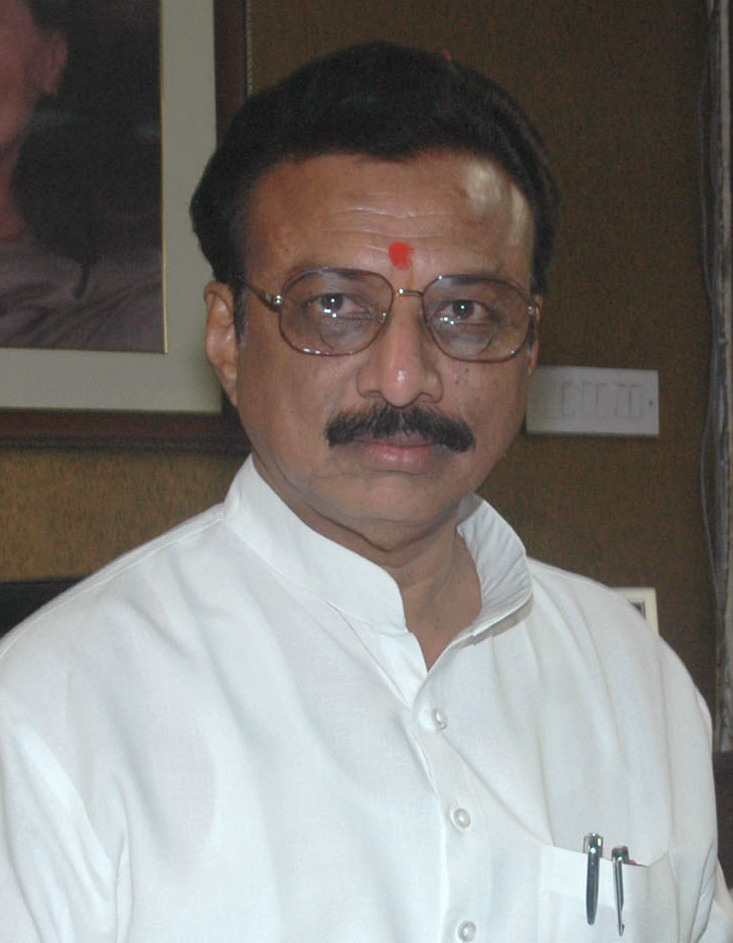
- Shri A. Sai Prathap after being sworn in as the Minister of State for Steel, in New Delhi on June 03, 2009

Minister of State for Heavy Industries & Public Enterprises Government of India
- In office 19 January 2011 - 12 July 2011
- Prime Minister: Manmohan Singh
- Minister: Praful Patel
- Preceded by: Pon Radhakrishnan
- Succeeded by: Vacant

Minister of State for Steel Government of India
- In office 3 June 2009 - 19 January 2011
- Prime Minister: Manmohan Singh
- Minister: Virbhadra Singh
- Preceded by: Jitin Prasada
- Succeeded by: Vacant

Member of Parliament, Lok Sabha
- In office 13 May 2004 — 16 May 2014
- Preceded by: Gunipati Ramaiah
- Succeeded by: P V Midhun Reddy
- Constituency: Rajampet
- In office 27 November 1989 — 6 October 1999
- Preceded by: Palakondrayudu Sugavasi
- Succeeded by: Gunipati Ramaiah
- Constituency: Rajampet

Personal details
- Born: 20 September 1944 (age 82) Kolar, Karnataka
- Party: Indian National Congress
- Other political affiliations: Telugu Desam Party
- Spouse: A. Krishnaveni Sai Prathap
- Children: 1 daughter
- As of 12 May 2006

Annayyagari Sai Prathap (born 20 September 1944) is an Indian politician from Andhra Pradesh. He represented Rajampet in the Lok Sabha from 1989 until 1999 and again from 2004 until 2014. During his last term, he served as Minister of State for Steel for almost two years and Minister of State for Heavy Industries and Public Enterprises for six months in the second Manmohan Singh ministry.

== Early life ==
Sai Prathap was born on 20 September 1944 to Thimmayya in Bellambari, Kolar. He belongs to Balija caste.

== Personal life ==
Sai Prathap married Krishnaveni in 1972 and the couple has one daughter.

== Political career ==
He opposed the Telangana movement, and submitted his resignation as a member of parliament in October 2013 after the government approved the creation of the new state. However, the resignation was rejected on the grounds that it was given under duress.

He was a member of the Indian National Congress throughout his political career until he joined the Telugu Desam Party in March 2016. However, he resigned and rejoined the Congress in May 2019.

Preceded by Palakondrayudu Sugavasi	Member of Parliament from Rajampet; 1989 – 1999	Succeeded by Gunipati Ramaiah
Preceded by Gunipati Ramaiah	Member of Parliament from Rajampet; 2004 – 2014	Succeeded by P. V. Midhun Reddy
