= Mana Biyyam =

Mana Biyyam (transl. Our [uncooked] rice) is a food welfare Programme by the Government of Andhra Pradesh where rice is supplied at 1 Rupee (about US$0.01618) per kilogram. It benefits some 2.25 crore (22.5 million) people. The government subsidy burden is Rs. 9,600,000,000 (about US$155.347 million) per year. The rice supplied is procured only from Andhra Pradesh at Rs.25.50 and sold at one rupee. The commodities along with rice are red gram, pamoleine oil, flour, wheat, salt, sugar, chilli powder, tamarind and turmeric powder (100 gm).The cost of the basket would be Rs 185 against the market price of Rs 292.

== History ==
The welfare scheme was launched on 16 January 2013 by the Chief Minister of Andhra Pradesh, Kiran Kumar Reddy. The plan by the opposition party was to give this all for free but due to economic inviability and ration-shop owner demands, a price was given.

== The Scheme ==
The scheme provides people living below poverty line, fine rice at one rupee a kilo with a ceiling of 20 kilos per family. Compared with other systems, this one packages and gives a certain variety of rice in an appeasing manner so as to attract locals instead of scaring them from poor-quality.
