= Nagaripalle =

Village in Andhra Pradesh, India

Nagiripalle is a small village near Kalikiri in Kalikiri mandal Annamayya district of Andhra Pradesh, India. The family of 16th chief minister of Andhra Pradesh Nallari Kiran Kumar Reddy hails from Nagiripalli.
