= Kodur Assembly constituency =

Constituency of the Andhra Pradesh Legislative Assembly, India

Coordinates: 13.96°N 79.35°E

Kodur
- Constituency No. 127 for the Andhra Pradesh Legislative Assembly
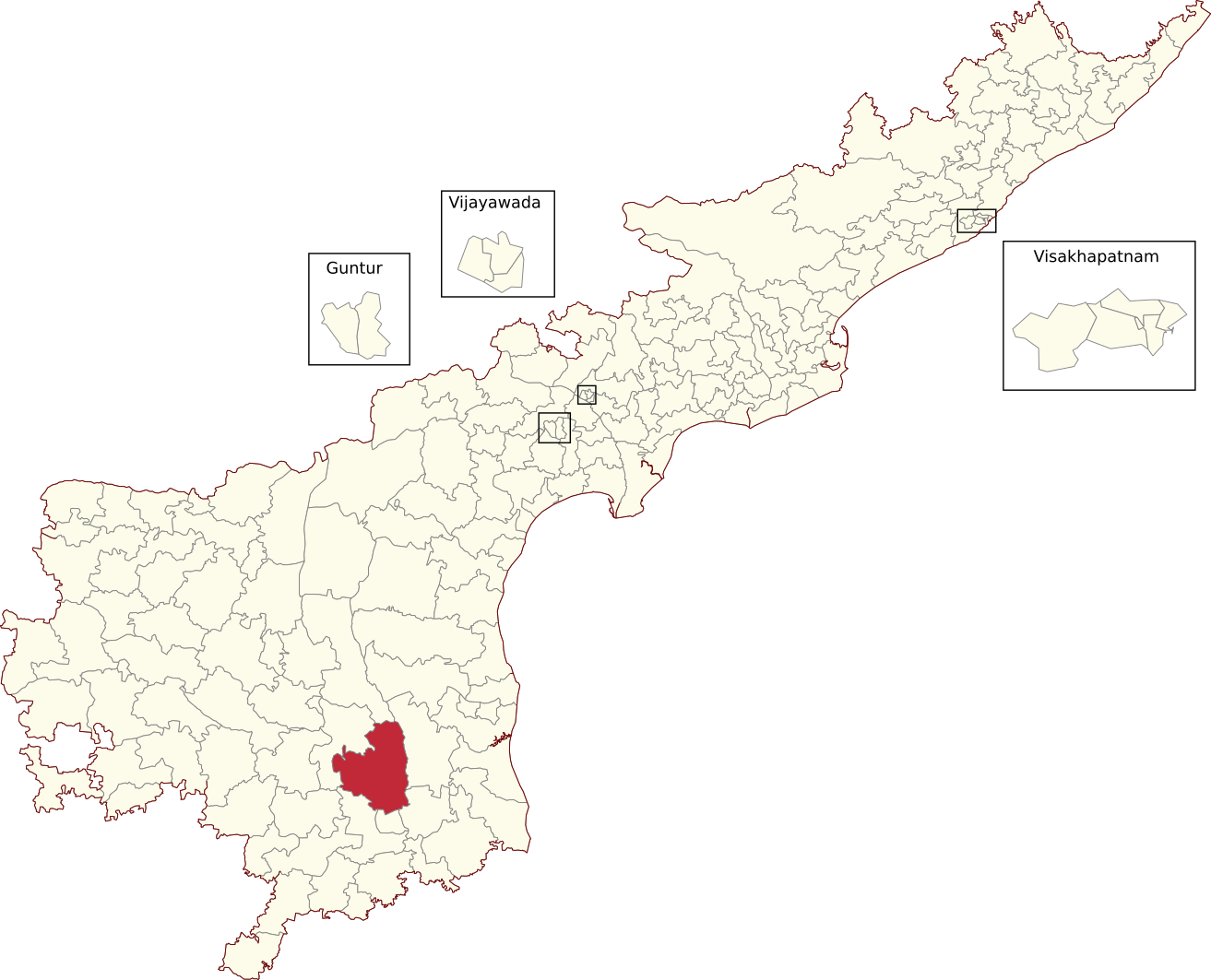
- Location of Kodur Assembly constituency within Andhra Pradesh

Constituency details
- Country: India
- Region: South India
- State: Andhra Pradesh
- District: Tirupati
- Lok Sabha constituency: Rajampet
- Established: 1962
- Total electors: 204,491
- Reservation: SC

Member of Legislative Assembly
- 16th Andhra Pradesh Legislative Assembly
- Incumbent Arava Sreedhar
- Party: JSP
- Alliance: NDA
- Elected year: 2024

Kodur is a Scheduled Caste reserved constituency in Tirupati district of Andhra Pradesh that elects representatives to the Andhra Pradesh Legislative Assembly in India. It is one of the seven assembly segments of Rajampet Lok Sabha constituency.

Arava Sreedhar is the current MLA of the constituency, having won the 2024 Andhra Pradesh Legislative Assembly election from Janasena Party. As of 2024, there are a total of 204,491 electors in the constituency. The constituency was established in 1962, as per the Delimitation Orders (1962).

== Mandals ==
Mandal
Penagalur
Chitvel
Pullampeta
Obulavaripalle
Railway Koduru

== Members of the Legislative Assembly ==
Year	Member	Political party
United Andhra
1962	N. Penchalaiah	Swatantra Party
1967	N. Penchalaiah	Swatantra Party
1972	Sriramulu Gunti	Indian National Congress
1978	Nidiganti Venkatasubbaiah	Janata Party
1983	Srinivasulu Settipalli	Telugu Desam Party
1985	Thoomati Penchalaiah	Telugu Desam Party
1989	Thoomati Penchalaiah	Telugu Desam Party
1994	Chennaiah Vaddi	Telugu Desam Party
1999	Somineni Saraswati	Telugu Desam Party
2004	Gunti Venkateswara Prasad	Indian National Congress
2009	Koramutla Srinivasulu	Indian National Congress
2012	Koramutla Srinivasulu	YSR Congress Party
Andhra
2014	Koramutla Srinivasulu	YSR Congress Party
2019	Koramutla Srinivasulu	YSR Congress Party
2024	Arava Sreedhar	Janasena Party

== Election results ==
=== 1978 ===
1978 Andhra Pradesh Legislative Assembly election: Kodur
Party	Candidate	Votes	%	±%
JP	Nidiganti Venkatasubbaiah	19,079	30.78	new
Independent	Yerrathota Venkatasubbaiah	17,391	28.05	
INC(I)	Penubala Peachalaiah	15,610	25.18	
INC	Gunti Sreeramulu	9,205	14.85	
Majority		1,688	2.73	
Turnout		61,980	64.7	
JP gain from INC		Swing		

=== 1983 ===
1983 Andhra Pradesh Legislative Assembly election: Kodur
Party	Candidate	Votes	%	±%
TDP	Srinivasulu Settipalli	45,889	63.98	new
INC	Sriramulu Gunti	21,650	30.18	▲15.33
CPI	Karnati Subbanna	3,130	4.36	
Majority		24,239	33.8	
Turnout		71,723	69	▲4.3
TDP gain from JP		Swing		

=== 1985 ===
1985 Andhra Pradesh Legislative Assembly election: Kodur
Party	Candidate	Votes	%	±%
TDP	Thoomati Penchalaiah	40,311	60.55	▼3.43
INC	Nediganti Venkatasubbaiah	24,806	37.26	▲7.08
Majority		15,505	23.3	
Turnout		66,566	59.7	▼9.3
TDP hold		Swing		

=== 1989 ===
1989 Andhra Pradesh Legislative Assembly election: Kodur
Party	Candidate	Votes	%	±%
TDP	Thoomati Penchalaiah	50,239	50.06	▼10.49
INC	Kotapati Dhananjaya	49,173	49.0	▲11.74
Majority		1,066	1.06	
Turnout		100,338	70.7	▲11.0
TDP hold		Swing		

=== 1994 ===
1994 Andhra Pradesh Legislative Assembly election: Kodur
Party	Candidate	Votes	%	±%
TDP	Chennaiah Vaddi	52,335	56.52	▲6.46
INC	Kotapati Dhanunjaya	37,573	40.58	▼8.42
Majority		14,762	15.54	
Turnout		92,582	69.3	▼1.4
TDP hold		Swing		

=== 1999 ===
1999 Andhra Pradesh Legislative Assembly election: Kodur
Party	Candidate	Votes	%	±%
TDP	Somineni Saraswathi	38,228	44.47	▼12.05
INC	Dr. Gunti Venkateswara Prasad	27,986	32.56	▼8.02
Independent	Eswaraiah Kanuparthi	16,336	19.0	
Majority		10,242	11.91	
Turnout		85,948	70.2	▲0.9
TDP hold		Swing		

=== 2004 ===
2004 Andhra Pradesh Legislative Assembly election: Kodur
Party	Candidate	Votes	%	±%
INC	Dr. Gunti Venkateswara Prasad	55,135	57.73	▲25.17
TDP	Smt. Jayamma Yerrathota	38,713	40.54	▼3.93
Majority		16,422	17.10	
Turnout		95,503	71.92	▲4.19
INC gain from TDP		Swing		

=== 2009 ===
2009 Andhra Pradesh Legislative Assembly election: Kodur
Party	Candidate	Votes	%	±%
INC	Koramutla Srinivasulu	51,747	43.98	▼13.75
TDP	Ajay Babu Nandavaram Benjimin	39,359	33.45	▼7.09
PRP	Samineni Saraswathi	22,122	18.80	new
Majority		12,388	10.53	
Turnout		117,663	74.40	▲2.48
INC hold		Swing		

=== 2012 by-election ===
2012 Andhra Pradesh Legislative Assembly by-election: Kodur
Party	Candidate	Votes	%	±%
YSRCP	Koramutla Srinivasulu	66,456	53.80	
INC	E. Kanuparthi	34,465	27.90	
TDP	Ajay Babu Nandavaram Benjimin	17,594	14.24	
Majority		31,991	25.89	
Turnout		123,530		
YSRCP gain from INC		Swing		

=== 2014 ===
2014 Andhra Pradesh Legislative Assembly election: Kodur
Party	Candidate	Votes	%	±%
YSRCP	Koramutla Srinivasulu	66,820	48.72	
TDP	Obili Subbaramaiah	64,848	47.29	▲13.84
Majority		1,972	1.43	
Turnout		137,138	77.67	▲3.27
YSRCP hold		Swing		

=== 2019 ===
2019 Andhra Pradesh Legislative Assembly election: Kodur
Party	Candidate	Votes	%	±%
YSRCP	Koramutla Srinivasulu	78,312	57.26	▲8.54
TDP	Panthagani Narasimha Prasad	43,433	31.76	▼15.53
JSP	Bonasi Venkata Subbaiah	9,964	7.29	new
NOTA	None Of The Above	1,570	1.14	
Majority		34,879	25.5	
Turnout		136,770	75.29	▼2.38
YSRCP hold		Swing		

=== 2024 ===
2024 Andhra Pradesh Legislative Assembly election: Kodur
Party	Candidate	Votes	%	±%
JSP	Arava Sreedhar	78,594	51.58	▲44.29
YSRCP	Koramutla Srinivasulu	67,493	44.29	▼12.97
INC	Gosala Devi	2,132	1.39	▲0.42
NOTA	None Of The Above	1,112	0.72	▼0.42
Majority		11,101	7.28	
Turnout		1,52,366	74.51	▼0.78
JSP gain from YSRCP		Swing		

== See also ==
- List of constituencies of Andhra Pradesh Vidhan Sabha
