= Adinarayana Hosahalli =

- village
- Adinarayana Hosahalli is in Bengaluru North district
- Nickname: A N Hosahalli
- Interactive map of Adinarayana Hosahalli
- Coordinates: 13.28°N 77.60°E
- Country: India
- State: Karnataka
- District: Bengaluru North
- Talukas: Doddaballapur

Government
  - Body: Bashettahalli Village Panchayat

Population (2011)As per census 2011
  - Total: 270

Languages
  - Official: Kannada
- Time zone: UTC+5:30 (IST)
- Postal code: 561203
- Nearest city: Bengaluru
- Civic agency: Village Panchayat

Adinarayana Hosahalli, commonly known by its nickname as A N Hosahalli, is a village located in the Doddaballapur taluk of Bengaluru North district, in the southern state of Karnataka, India. The village is nearly 5 km from Doddaballapura.

As per the 2011 census, the village had 72 families and its population was roughly around 270 people. A N Hosahalli shares its border with Nagadenahalli to the North-West, Alur Duddanahalli to the North-East, Moparahalli to the West, and Obadenahalli to the South-East.

Major Cast: Vokkaliga, Dhobi, SC (Adhi Karnataka).

Occupation: Agriculture is the main occupation, while animal husbandry is the main source of economy of the people. The Karnataka Industrial Area Development Board (KIADB) Phase I, II and III coming up near the village will be a boon for the village's youth.

== See also ==
- Bengaluru North district
- Districts of Karnataka
