= Kiran Kumar Reddy =

Indian politician (born 1959)

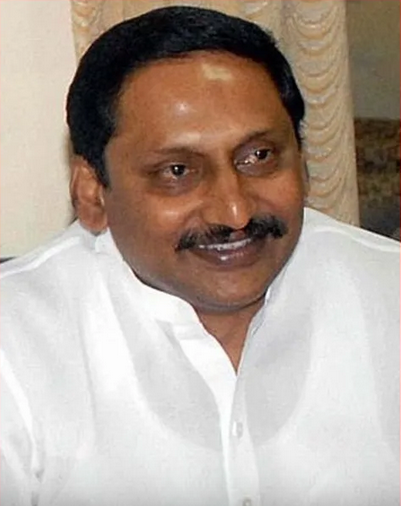
- Reddy in 2013

16th Chief Minister of Andhra Pradesh
- In office 25 November 2010 – 1 March 2014
- Governor: E. S. L. Narasimhan
- Deputy Chief Minister: Damodar Raja Narasimha (2011-2014)
- Preceded by: K. Rosaiah
- Succeeded by: N. Chandrababu Naidu (Andhra Pradesh); K. Chandrashekar Rao (Telangana)

Minister for Home Affairs Government of Andhra Pradesh
- In office 27 May 2013 – 1 March 2014
- Governor: E. S. L. Narasimhan
- Chief Minister: Himself
- Preceded by: Sabitha Indra Reddy
- Succeeded by: Nimmakayala Chinarajappa (Andhra Pradesh); Nayani Narasimha Reddy (Telangana)

17th Speaker of the Andhra Pradesh Legislative Assembly
- In office 4 June 2009 – 24 November 2010
- Leader of the House: Y. S. Rajasekhara Reddy; Konijeti Rosaiah
- Deputy Speaker: Nadendla Manohar
- Preceded by: K. R. Suresh Reddy
- Succeeded by: Nadendla Manohar

Member of Andhra Pradesh Legislative Assembly
- In office 16 May 2009 – 16 May 2014
- Preceded by: P. Ramachandra Reddy
- Succeeded by: Chintala Ramachandra Reddy
- Constituency: Pileru
- In office 6 October 1999 – 16 May 2009
- Preceded by: Chintala Ramachandra Reddy
- Succeeded by: constituency abolished
- Constituency: Vayalpad
- In office 29 November 1989 – 11 December 1994
- Preceded by: Nallari Amaranath Reddy
- Succeeded by: Chintala Ramachandra Reddy
- Constituency: Vayalpad

Personal details
- Born: Nallari Kiran Kumar Reddy; 13 September 1960 (age 66) Hyderabad, Andhra Pradesh (Present Day Telangana), India
- Party: Bharatiya Janata Party (2023 - present)
- Other political affiliations: Indian National Congress (until March 2014 & 2018 - 2023); Jai Samaikyandhra Party (2014 – 2018)

Nallari Kiran Kumar Reddy (born 13 September 1960) is an Indian politician who served as the 16th Chief Minister of Andhra Pradesh between 25 November 2010 and 1 March 2014. He was the last Chief Minister of the United Andhra Pradesh.

Reddy was sworn in as the 16th Chief Minister of Andhra Pradesh on 25 November 2010. A four-time Member of the Legislative Assembly in Andhra Pradesh, he was a leader of the Indian National Congress party before resigning from it in February 2014 over the creation of Telangana state. Concurrently Reddy also submitted his resignation from the chief ministership to Governor E. S. L. Narasimhan; the latter accepted the resignation but asked Reddy to continue as caretaker chief minister. President's Rule was imposed in the state on 1 March 2014. On 10 March 2014 he floated his new political outfit called Jai Samaikyandhra Party. In elections the party failed to win a single seat and lost deposits in numerous seats. The party dissolved on 13 July 2018 and Reddy re-joined the Indian National Congress.

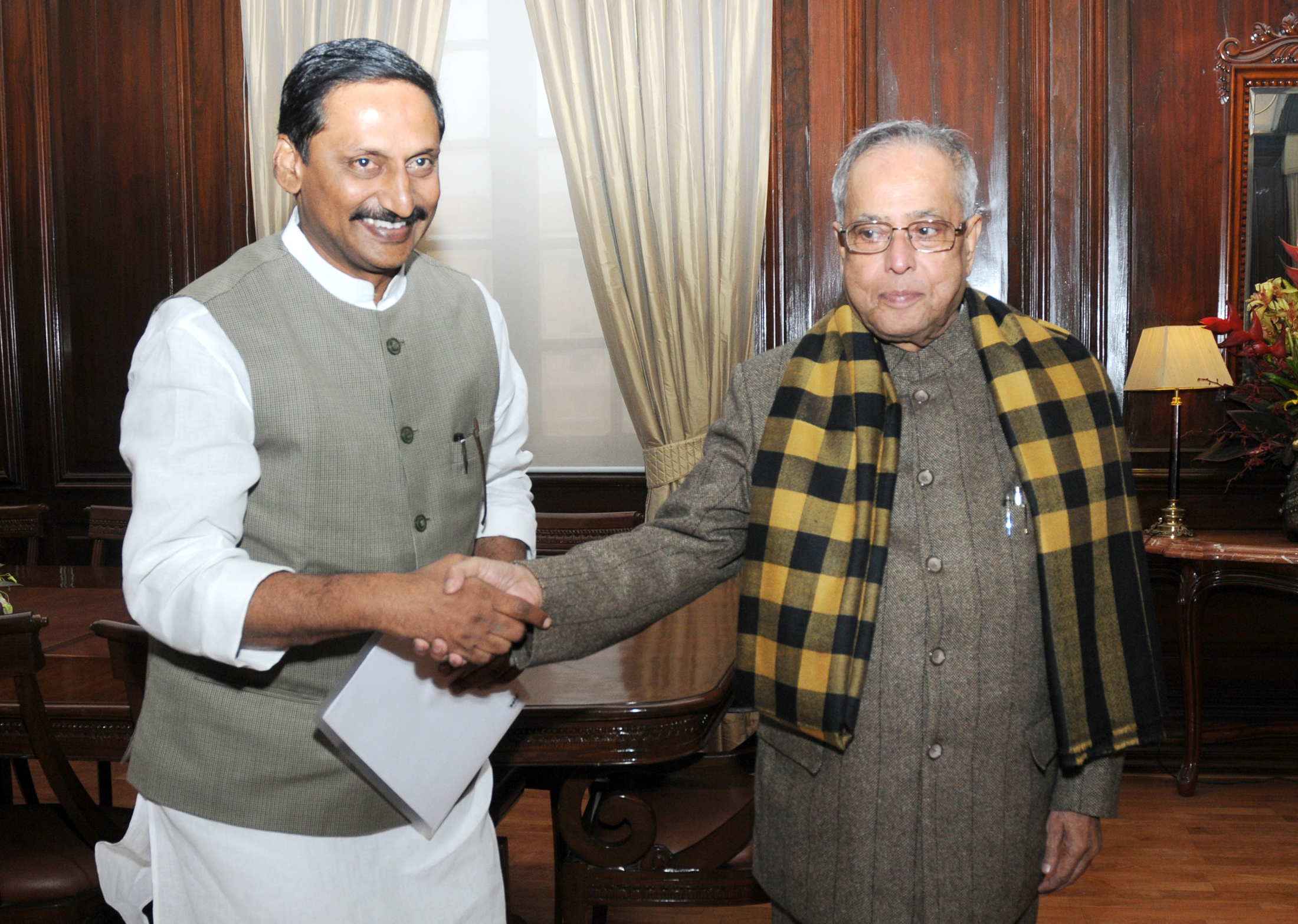
Reddy with the then President, Pranab Mukherjee

In April 2023, Reddy joined Bharatiya Janata Party in New Delhi in presence of Union Minister Pralhad Joshi.

== Early life ==
Kiran Kumar Reddy was a member of the Indian National Congress party and his father, Amaranath Reddy, was a minister in P. V. Narasimha Rao's cabinet. His family hails from Nagaripalle, near Kalikiri, Annamayya district (erstwhile Chittoor) . He did his schooling from Hyderabad Public School and intermediate from St. Joseph's Junior College, Hyderabad. He did his B.Com. from Nizam College and LL.B. from University College of Law, Osmania University. He was an avid cricketer in college. He was batch mates with Nandamuri Balakrishna and former Indian Cricket team captain, Mohammad Azharuddin, who also represented Hyderabad in the Ranji trophy. He also captained the Hyderabad under-22, South Zone Universities and Osmania University cricket teams. He also attended Besant Theosophical High School in Chennai for some years.

== Political career ==
Reddy was elected to Andhra Pradesh Legislative Assembly in 1989 after his father's death. He served as member of the Public Undertakings Committee and Assurance Committee. He was elected to the state assembly from Native Vayalpadu (Valmikipuram) in 1989, 1999 and 2004. He lost in 1994 when Congress was routed in Chittoor district. He won from Pileru in 2009 after Valmikipuram got merged into Pileru constituency under delimitation. A known YSR loyalist, he was the Congress government chief whip for five years from 2004, before he was made the speaker. On 10 March 2014 he announced the formation of Jai Samaikyandhra Party with Chundru Srihari Rao as its Founder-President.

He re-joined the Congress party in July 2018 in the presence of Congress president Rahul Gandhi. In April 2023, he joined Bharatiya Janata Party.

=== As Speaker ===
Reddy was unanimously elected as Speaker of the 13th Andhra Pradesh Assembly in June 2009. His name for the speaker's post was proposed by erstwhile chief minister YS Rajasekhara Reddy, AIMIM floor leader Akbaruddin Owaisi, Agriculture minister N. Raghuveera Reddy and two other independents.

=== As Chief Minister ===
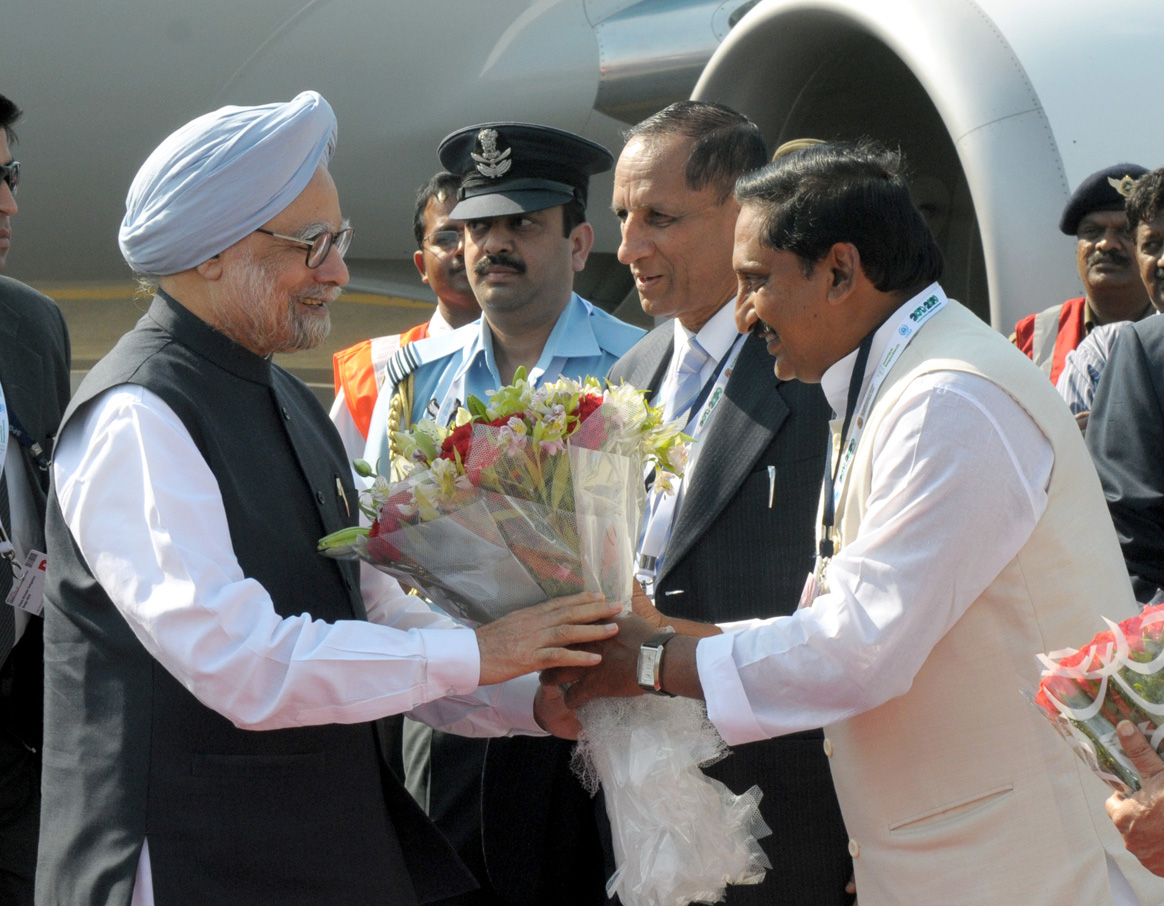
The then Prime Minister, Manmohan Singh being received by Reddy and the then Governor of Andhra Pradesh, E. S. L. Narasimhan, on his arrival, at Rajiv Gandhi International Airport, in Hyderabad

Reddy was made to be the new Chief Minister of Andhra Pradesh after incumbent Konijeti Rosaiah resigned citing personal reasons, by the Congress Legislature Party and authorised party in 2011. On 19 February 2014, he resigned from the post of Chief Minister, as MLA (legislator) and also from the Congress party, after the Telangana bill was passed in Lok Sabha. He was also the last chief minister for united Andhra Pradesh from Indian National Congress.

==== Welfare programmes ====
Reddy is credited with launching schemes such as Mee Seva, Rajiv Yuva Kiranalu, SC/ST Sub-Plan, Bangaru Thalli, Mana Biyyam, Amma Hastham, and the Chittor water scheme.

=== Jai Samaikyandhra Party ===
On 11 March 2014, Reddy wanted to launch a new political party in order to survive in the state and named as Jai Samaikyandhra Party, by opposing the centre's decision on bifurcation of the Andhra Pradesh state. He formally launched the party in Rajahmundry on 12 March 2014. Finally, Reddy dissolved it and re-joined INC on 13 July 2018.

=== Bharatiya Janata Party ===
Reddy left the Congress Party to join the Bharatiya Janata Party in April 2023.

In the 2024 Lok Sabha elections, Kiran Kumar Reddy contested from Rajampet Lok Sabha constituency as the Bharatiya Janata Party candidate representing the TDP–BJP–JSP alliance.

He secured 5,68,773 votes (42.67%) but lost by 76,071 votes to P. V. Midhun Reddy of the YSR Congress Party, who received 6,44,844 votes (48.93%).

== See also ==
- List of chief ministers of Andhra Pradesh

Preceded by Konijeti Rosaiah	Chief Minister of Andhra Pradesh; 25 June 2011 – 19 February 2014	Succeeded by N. Chandrababu Naidu
Preceded by K R Suresh Reddy	Speaker of Andhra Pradesh State Assembly; 2009–2011	Succeeded by Nadendla Manohar
