= Rayachoty =

- Town
- Rayachoty
- Location in Andhra Pradesh, India
- Coordinates: 14°03′30″N 78°45′06″E
- Country: India
- State: Andhra Pradesh
- Region: Rayalaseema
- District: Annamayya
- Electorate: 2,31,637 – Rayachoty

Government
  - Type: Chairman-council government
  - Body: Rayachoty Municipality
  - MLA: Mandipalli Ramprasad Reddy

Area
  - Total: 39.78 km^{2} (15.36 sq mi)

Population (2021)
  - Total: 125,000
  - Density: 3,140/km^{2} (8,140/sq mi)
- Demonym(s): Raachaveeteenu (రాచవీటీను), Rachaveedoru (రాచవీడోరు), Rayachoteenu (రాయచోటీను), Rayachotoru (రాయచోటోరు), Rachaveeduvanru (రాచవీడువాన్ఱు), Rayachotivanru(రాయచోటివాన్ఱు)

Languages
  - Official: Telugu
- Time zone: UTC+5:30 (IST)
- PIN: 516269
- Telephone code: 08561
- Vehicle registration: AP04 and AP39
- Website: rayachoty.com

Rayachoty is one of the oldest towns in Andhra Pradesh, India. Up to the end of 2025, it served as district headquarters to Annamayya district which is formed after Rajampet (Lok Sabha constituency) of the Indian state of Andhra Pradesh. Rayachoty remains the headquarters to its own revenue division.

== Demographics ==
Religions in Rayachoty
Religion	Percent
Hindu	50.32%
Muslim	49.09%
Others†	0.59%
†Includes Sikhs, Jains, Christians

Languages in Rayachoty
Language	Percent
Telugu	52.99%
Urdu	46.18%
Others	0.83%

As of the 2011 Indian census, Rayachoty is classified as a municipal city in the district of YSR, Andhra Pradesh. The city of Rayachoty is divided into 34 wards, and city elections are held every 5 years. The Rayachoty Municipality has a population of 91,234 of which 46,517 are males and 44,717 are females.

The population of children aged 0–6 is 11,446, comprising 12.55% of the total population of Rayachoty. In Rayachoty Municipality, the female sex ratio is 961, lower than the state average of 993. The child sex ratio in Rayachoty is also lower, around 898 compared to an Andhra Pradesh state average of 939. The literacy rate of Rayachoty City is 73.58%, higher than the state average of 67.02%. In Rayachoty, Male literacy is around 82.07% while the female literacy rate is 64.84%.

Rayachoty Municipality has total administration over 20,452 houses to which it supplies basic amenities like water and sewerage. It is also authorized to build roads within Municipality limits and impose taxes on properties coming under its jurisdiction. It is a 3rd largest town by population, education, financial and economic after the Kadapa and Proddutur.

=== Rayachoty administrative change ===
On 31 December 2025, Rayachoty ceased to be the administrative headquarters of the Annamayya district following a state cabinet decision to reorganise district boundaries. The headquarters was officially shifted to Madanapalle. While Rayachoty remains the headquarters of its own revenue division and a major urban centre, the district collectorate and SP offices were relocated as part of a broader administrative restructuring that increased the total number of districts in Andhra Pradesh to 28. The move was met with local protests and demonstrations by the Joint Action Committee (JAC) and various political groups.

== History ==
Rayachoty was historically governed by a wide array of kingdoms, sultanates and empires. It used to be known as 'Rachouty' or 'Rachoutee'.

List of nations governing Rayachoty:

- Mysore (1557–1616)
- Bijapur Sultanate (1616–1693)
- Mughal Empire (1693–1710)
- Nawab of Carnatic (Arcot State) (1710–1770)
- Mysore Dominions (1770–1799)
- Ceded Districts (1799)
- Madras Presidency and Madras State until State Reorganisation in 1955

== Villages in Rayachoty Mandal ==
S.No	Village Name	Area (in Sq. km)
1	Abbavaram (Rural)	10.59
2	Indukurupalle	3.40
3	Sibyala	40.61
4	Chennamukkapalle	3.05
5	Peddakalvapalle	0.88
6	Pemmadapalle	6.94
7	Syamalavaripalle	0.75
8	Dullavaripalle	2.48
9	Madhavaram	39.5
10	THURPUPALLI	7 KLM
	Total	68.70

== Historical Members of the Legislative Assembly ==
- 1955 – Y. Audinarayana Reddy – Indian National Congress
- 1962 – Rachamalla Narayana Reddy – Swatantra Party
- 1967 – M. K. Reddy – Indian National Congress
- 1972 – Habibullah Mahal – Indian National Congress
- 1978 – Sugavasi Palakondrayudu – Janata Party
- 1983 – Sugavasi Palakondrayudu – Independent politician
- 1985 – Mandipalle Nagi Reddy – Indian National Congress
- 1989 – Mandipalle Nagi Reddy – Indian National Congress
- 1994 – M. Narayana Reddy – Indian National Congress
- 1999 – Sugavasi Palakondrayudu – Telugu Desam Party
- 2004 – Sugavasi Palakondrayudu – Telugu Desam Party
- 2009 – Gadikota Srikanth Reddy – Indian National Congress
- 2012-Gadikota Srikanth Reddy -YSR Congress Party-bypoll
- 2014 –Gadikota Srikanth Reddy - YSR Congress Party
- 2019 – Gadikota Srikanth Reddy – YSR Congress Party
- 2024 - Mandipalli Ramprasad Reddy - Telugu Desam Party

== Transport ==
Rayachoty is well connected by road, rail (in construction) and air (45 km to Kadapa Airport). There are 9 main roads within the town. Three National highways pass through the town.

- National Highway 40, Kurnool–Piler-Chittoor–Ranipet passes through the town. NH40 is also called the Rayalaseema Express highway.
- National Highway 340 connects the town with the Kurabalakunta road of (Bangalore–Madanapalli–Rayachoty–Kadapa) Andhra Pradesh.
- Proposed NH 370 Nellore to Anathapuram (Nellore–Rapur–Rajampet–Rayachoty–Kadiri–Anathapuram) is currently under planning.

The Andhra Pradesh State Road Transport Corporation operates bus services from the Rayachoty bus Depot.

There is a railway station under construction in Rayachoty under the Kadapa-Bangalore railway project.

== Education ==
Primary and secondary school education is provided by both government-aided and private schools under the state's School Education Department. The languages of instruction followed by different schools include English, Telugu and Urdu. Rayachoty has a literacy rate of 61.6%; male literacy is 73% and female literacy is 51%. Most adolescents leave the region upon graduation due to lack of employment opportunities.

The town has one of the oldest Teacher Training Institutes (DIET) in the region, dating back to the British occupation. There is an engineering college and a government polytechnic college in Rayachoty town. The government allocated 55 acres of land for the establishment of Yogi Vemana University PG extension in the year 2023 to support local students. There were some rumours spreading over in this region some premier institutions like Central Agricultural University or Medical institute will buit over this region to compensate the loss of district headquarters.

== Notable locations ==
Rayachoty is known for its thousand-year old temple dedicated to Lord Sri Veerabhadra Swamy (also called Dakshina Kaasi). The temple is located on the bank of Mandavya river. This temple is unique in that Daksha Prajapati appears to be in the worshipping form of the Lord Veerabhadra Swamy.
