= Rajiv Yuva Kiranalu =

Government of Andhra Pradesh
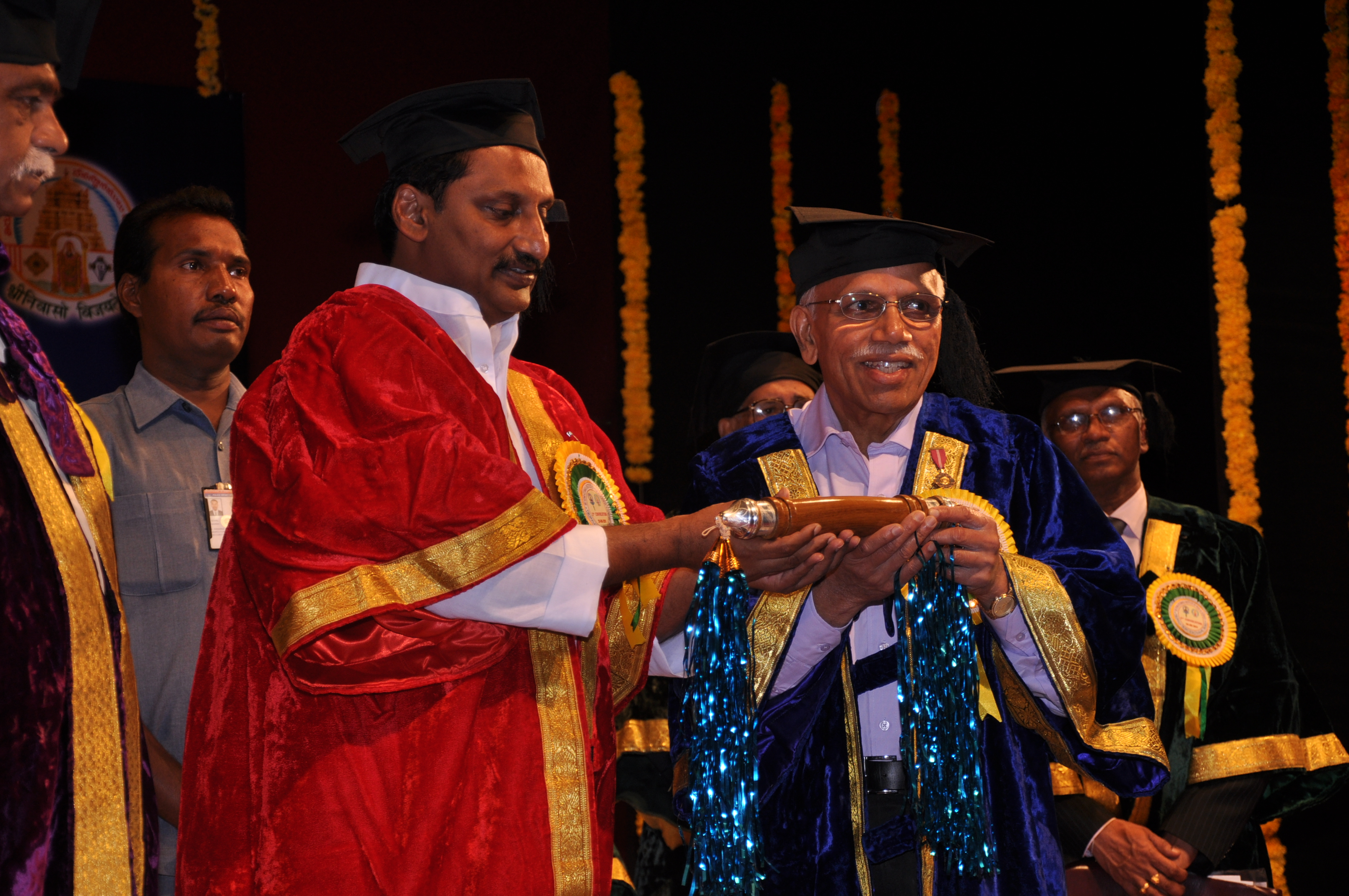
- B M Hegde with Kiran Kumar Reddy

Overview
- Meeting place: Hyderabad
- Website: www.aponline.gov.in
- Governor: Ekkadu Srinivasan Lakshmi Narasimhan
- Chief Minister: Kiran Kumar Reddy

Rajiv Yuva Kiranalu is an employment and skill development programme launched by the Government of Andhra Pradesh. It aims to employ 15 lakh youth in the private sector by 2014. Rajiv Yuva Kiranalu (RYK) is an initiative by the Government of Andhra Pradesh with the idea of providing skills to the youth of Andhra Pradesh between the ages of 18 and 35. RYK was started with the aim of training the youth in the rural and urban areas thereby imparting skills to them and helping them in getting employment opportunities in the private sector. The major stakeholders of the program are the Government, Industry, training centres, unemployed youth and placement institutions.

== History ==
The Programme was launched on 20 August 2011 by the chief minister of Andhra Pradesh, Kiran Kumar Reddy.

== Vision ==
The vision of this program is to train a large number of uneducated, unemployed, and unskilled youth by providing them technical knowledge in a variety of courses like Welding, Accounts, Typing, Data entry, Multimedia, Tally, Supply chain management and customer relations etc. as well as grooming them by providing Personality development classes. Thus the program aims at converting the uneducated, unskilled and unemployed youth into skilled, productive individuals, by providing them job specific skills, hence promoting overall inclusive growth.

== Mission ==
The mission of RYK is to place 15 lakh youth in productive employment areas in the Private sector by 2014, thereby promoting Inclusive growth.

== Objectives ==
The Government of Andhra Pradesh has constituted two bodies, Rajiv Education and Employment Mission in Andhra Pradesh (REEMAP) and Rajiv Education and Employment Council of Andhra Pradesh (REECAP). The primary objective of REEMAP and REECAP is to identify the areas of employment opportunities for the Youth. These bodies also play the role of supervising the submissions and ensuring active collaboration between the public private sectors.

== REECAP ==
Rajiv Education and Employment Council of Andhra Pradesh (REECAP) was set up under the chairmanship of the Chief Minister along with nine cabinet ministers, Principle Secretaries and ten representatives of the Industry and academia. This body was created to bring together the Government, Industry and Academia to maximize Employment opportunities for the youth.

== REEMAP ==
Rajiv Education and Employment Mission in Andhra Pradesh (REEMAP)- This is a state level body that was formulated to co-ordinate all the seven submissions of RYK. It is a registered body that acts as an umbrella for all the seven submissions. These submissions are listed below:

- Employment Generation and Marketing Mission (EGMM)- This submission was set up by the Department of Rural Development of the Andhra Pradesh, DRDA. EGMM focuses specifically on training the rural unemployed youth. At present 2,26,909 youth have been trained by EGMM training centres and 75% of them have been placed the private sector in entry-level jobs. Out of the total number of youth placed 45% are girls and 37% are SCs/ STs. EGMM training centres provide training in the retail sector (Big Bazaar, Reliance Fresh, ITC Choupal etc.), sales (Vodafone, Airtel), BPO's (HDFC Bank).
- Employment and Training - This submission focuses on training the youth of urban areas. This submission is headed by the Commissioner, Employment and Training.
- Mission for elimination of poverty in municipal areas (MEPMA)- This submission focuses on the unemployed youth of urban slum areas. Its mission is to enable them to have a good quality of life.
- Sub-Mission for placements for polytechnic (pass/fail) - This submission aims at training youth passing out from technical institutions who are unable to receive jobs.
- Sub- Mission for Differently abled - Disabled Welfare
- Minorities Welfare Greater Hyderabad Municipal Corporation (GHMC)- This submission aims at training the unemployed youth of Hyderabad city.

== Eligibility Criteria ==
Any school/college drop outs, unemployed youth, employed individuals seeking skills or funding for self-employment and individuals with technical or non technical background looking for employment are eligible for RYK training. Any candidate interested in joining a training centre under RYK should have a Ration Card number, SSC marks memo number (for those who have passed class 10th) and mobile number.

== The Programme ==
Rajiv Yuva Kiranalu is the flagship program of the Government of Andhra Pradesh. RYK is tapping funds from various Government of India programmes. To meet additional requirements for funds Government of Andhra Pradesh has set up a skill development fund. This fund will be used to fund all the sub-missions, spreading awareness for the program, conducting post placement tracking and implementing an IT based monitoring system. Apart from training of the unemployed youth providing self-employment skills is also a part of the program. The core strategy of RYK includes pre-identification of jobs in the private sector, conducting the required training for the youth and offering placements.

The target for placements and the actual number of placements achieved for each year from 2011 to 2013 are given in the following table:

Year	Target (lakhs)	Achieved (lakhs)
2011-12	2.5	1.6
2012-13	3.4	1.6
2013-14	3.2	1.65

There are some non negotiables in the programme which include:

- A call letter generation from the employers should be done within 3 months of registration.
- There should be a minimum of 40% of SC/ST candidates in the training centres as part of the training and placement procedure.
- 40% of the candidates involved in training and placements should be women.
- Post placement support shall be given to all candidates employed under RYK.
- Placement details shall be disclosed to the trainees before the beginning of the training.

The training provided to the students are free of cost, also no fee is charged for placements. Before training a counselling session is held in which all the details about the salary, job, working conditions, perks, shifts etc. are told. RYK provides placements only in the private sector and no government jobs are offered after the training. Apart from training and placements, direct placements and job melas are also conducted as part of the placement services. The students are allowed to attend the training only once. They will not be given any stipend during the training period. the candidates will also be provided post placement support services. Such services would include:

- accommodation/hostel facility,
- opening of salary account,
- insurance,
- access to health services
- counseling services

To monitor the attendance of the candidates in a more effective manner, the Government of Andhra Pradesh introduced the biometric system of attendance.

=== Implementation ===
A web portal has also been established for implementation and monitoring of the programme. The first step is to identify the demand in the industries and potential of growth in these industries. The next step involves mobilization of the unemployed youth by the ground staff which includes the APM (assistant project manager), JRP (Job Resource Person), CF (Community Facilitator), CO (Community Organizers) and RP (Resource Persons). Mobilization is also done through SHG's. RYK targets the bottom most level of the pyramid, hence villages and slum areas are also covered in the mobilization process. After the youth has been mobilized successfully, an electronic registration of candidates interested in taking up the training is done. The next step involves mapping the job opportunities available. The youth are trained in training centres working with RYK, where they are given industry specific skills. Finally, the gap between demand and supply is bridged by conducting placements. A post-placement follow up is also done to check the retention rate of candidates, address their grievances.

=== IT System ===
- Registration of the Candidate: The candidate's details are validated by checking the ration card or the SSC number. His/Her preference for training is also taken into account.
- Mobilization: Call letters are issued to selected candidates. Photo of candidate is uploaded while reporting for the training.
- Course Master: Duration of the course and fee structure should be standardized.
- Training Centre Registration: All centres are registered and their infrastructure details are recorded.
- Batch Mapping: Candidates are mapped to the batch once they reach the centre.

=== Training Centres ===
Training centres run by professional training partners have been partnered with to undertake training for youth registered under RYK. These training centres are selected through a two-stage bidding process. These are private training centres managed by the Government. The training centres have the responsibility of taking up training of unemployed youth and their placement. The training centres offer a variety of courses ranging from Finance to Sales. These courses are usually of 30 days to 90 days period.

=== Training and Placement Models ===
1. Government of India Partnership models
2. Self Employment
3. Job Melas
4. Industry based training centres
5. Placement with professional training partners
6. Job melas

== See also ==
- Government of Andhra Pradesh
- Politics of Andhra Pradesh
- Kiran Kumar Reddy
