= Konduru Prabhavatamma =

Indian politician

Konduru Prabhavatamma is an Indian politician from Andhra Pradesh. She is a three time member of the Andhra Pradesh Legislative Assembly from Rajampet Assembly constituency.

Prabhavatamma is from Paturu village in Nandaluru mandalam, Kadapa district.

== Career ==
In 1978, Prabhavatamma first became an MLA winning the Rajampet Assembly constituency representing the Indian National Congress and retained the seat for Congress even as the new party, Telugu Desam, swept the polls in 1983. Again after a gap of 21 years, she was re-elected in 2004 Andhra Pradesh Legislative Assembly election. In 2004, she polled 54,246 votes and defeated her nearest rival, Brahmaiah Pasupuleti of the Telugu Desam Party, by a margin of 23,667 votes.
