= Gadikota Srikanth Reddy =

Indian politician

Government Chief Whip Andhra Pradesh Legislative Assembly
- In office 6 June 2019 – 4 June 2024
- Speaker: Tammineni Sitaram
- Preceded by: Palle Raghunatha Reddy

Member of Legislative Assembly, Andhra Pradesh
- In office 2009–2024
- Preceded by: Palakondrayudu Sugavasi
- Succeeded by: Mandipalli Ramprasad Reddy
- Constituency: Rayachoti

Personal details
- Born: 15 June 1973 (age 53) Ramapuram
- Party: YSR Congress Party
- Other political affiliations: Indian National Congress (2009–2012)
- Spouse: Siva Lalitha Polu
- Children: Rithvik Reddy, Chahana Reddy
- Occupation: Politics

Gadikota Srikanth Reddy is a former Member of the Legislative Assembly (Ex-MLA) of Andhra Pradesh, a state in southern India. He was elected in the 2009 general assembly elections, when he defeated the sitting MLA. Reddy is a supporter of Y. S. Jagan Mohan Reddy, president of Yuvajana Sramika Rythu Congress Party. Gadikota Srikanth Reddy was the Chief Whip in Andhra Pradesh State Legislative Assembly from 2019 to 2024.

His father, Gadikota Mohan Reddy, served as a MLA from the Lakkireddipalle constituency between 1999 and 2009.

In 2012, he resigned his membership in the Indian National Congress party and his membership in the Andhra Pradesh Legislative Assembly as a loyal gesture to popular leader, Y.S. Raja Shekara Reddy. He was re-elected to the Assembly on Yuvajana Sramika Rythu Congress Party ticket. He got a record majority of over 50,000 votes. Mr. Reddy represented Rayachoti as an MLA for four successive terms starting from 2009 to 2019.

On 1 April 2017, Reddy demanded that Tirupati be made the second capital of Andhra Pradesh. Gadikota Srikanth Reddy was appointed the chief whip of the Yuvajana Sramika Rythu Congress party led state government in Andhra Pradesh and now appointed district president of Annamayya.

== Positions held ==
SL.NO	From	To	Position	Party	Margin
1.	2009	2012	MLA (1st term) from Rayachoti	Indian National Congress	14,832
2.	2012	2014	MLA (2nd term) from Rayachoti	YSRCP	56,891
3.	2014	2019	MLA (3rd term) from Rayachoti	YSRCP	34,782
4.	2019	2024	MLA (4th term) from Rayachoti	YSRCP	32,862

=== First term (2009–2012) ===
Gadikota won on the Congress ticket from Rayachoti in 2009 elections, through his Congress party. He defeated his nearest rival Sugavasi Palakondrayudu by a margin of over 10,000 votes.

=== Second term (2012–2014) ===
Gadikota resigned as INC MLA as he was suspended by the party for supporting Y.S. Jagan Mohan Reddy and won with YSRCP with a staggering 50000+ majority.

=== Third term (2014–2019) ===
Despite a huge TDP wave Gadikota still managed to get a majority of over 30000+ but his party YSRCP failed to form Government.

=== Fourth term (2019–2024) ===
Gadikota Srikanth Reddy emerged victorious in Rayachoti again with a majority over 30000 and he also secured himself as Chief Whip of Andhra Pradesh Government as well as District President of Annamayya.

== Family history ==
Gadikota family maintained strong political dominance in Ramapuram mandal, consistently securing majority support and holding influence in local and assembly-level politics from the 1970s onward. Beginning with the rise of Gadikota Ramasubba Reddy and later carried forward by Gadikota Dwarakanath Reddy, Gadikota Mohan Reddy, and Srikanth Reddy himself, the family established a lasting political presence in the region. Representing Rayachoti for multiple consecutive terms, Srikanth Reddy and his father strengthened this legacy through his victories in 1999, 2004, 2009, 2012, 2014, and 2019. Known for his role as Government Chief Whip and his influence within the YSR Congress Party, he became a central figure in regional politics while carrying forward a political tradition that had dominated Ramapuram mandal since 1972.

== Post-2024 Political Career ==
Gadikota Srikanth Reddy, after the 2024 election setback, was appointed as the party General Secretary of the YSR Congress Party. Following his electoral loss, he transitioned into a key organizational role within the party, continuing to hold significant influence in internal strategy and leadership coordination.

== Personal life ==
Gadikota Srikanth Reddy was born in 1973 in Tirupati to Gadikota Mohan Reddy and Krishnamma. He pursued his education up to the intermediate level in Kadapa. Later, he transitioned to Bangalore for his university studies. Subsequently, he relocated to the United States, where he dedicated 11 years to the IT sector. In 2001, he entered into matrimony with Lalitha and promptly returned to India, demonstrating a pronounced inclination towards the realm of politics. Gadikota Srikanth Reddy served as the Congress Youth President under the leadership of Y.S. Rajasekhara Reddy. He has two children, one son and one daughter.
