= Pothuraju Parthasarthy =

Indian politician (born 1916)

Member of Parliament, Lok Sabha
- In office 1967–1984
- Preceded by: C. L. Narasimha Reddy
- Succeeded by: Palakondrayudu Sugavasi
- Constituency: Rajampet

Pothuraju Parthasarthy (born 1 July 1916) was an Indian politician who was a member of 4th Lok Sabha from Rajampet (Lok Sabha constituency) in Andhra Pradesh State, India. He was born in Kodur, Cuddapah District.

Parthasarthy was elected to 5th, 6th and 7th Lok Sabha from Rajampet.
