= Akepati Amarnath Reddy =

Indian politician (born 1962)

Member of Legislative Assembly Andhra Pradesh
- Incumbent
- Assumed office 2024
- Preceded by: Meda Venkata Mallikarjuna Reddy
- Constituency: Rajampet

Personal details
- Born: 1962 (age 63–64)
- Party: YSR Congress Party

Akepati Amarnath Reddy (born 1962) is an Indian politician from Andhra Pradesh. He is an MLA from Rajampet Assembly constituency in the erstwhile Kadapa district which is now in the carved out Annamayya district. He represents YSR Congress Party. He won the 2024 Andhra Pradesh Legislative Assembly election. He is a three time MLA from Rajampet.

== Early life and education ==
Amarnath is from Rajampet. His father's name is Akepati Narayanareddy Reddy. His brother name is Akepati Anil Reddy. He completed his B.Sc. in 1982.

== Political career ==
Amarnath won for the first time as an MLA from Rajampet Assembly constituency in the 2009 Andhra Pradesh Legislative Assembly election representing Indian National Congress. He defeated Kasireddy Madan Mohan Reddy of Telugu Desam Party by a margin of 12,342 votes.

He shifted to YSR Congress Party and retained the seat in 2012 Andhra Pradesh by-election contesting on YSRCP ticket. He defeated Meda Venkata Mallikarjuna Reddy of Indian National Congress by a margin of 38,219 votes. He lost to Mallikarjuna Reddy, who contested on TDP ticket, in the 2014 Assembly election by a margin of 11,617 votes. He regained the Rajampet seat for YSR Congress Party in the 2024 Andhra Pradesh Legislative Assembly election despite an anti-incumbent wave. He polled 92,609 votes and defeated Bala Subramanyam Sugavasi of Telugu Desam Party by a margin of 7,016 votes. He is one of the 11 YSRCP MLAs who won the 2024 Assembly election.
