= Bathyala Changal Rayudu =

Indian politician

Member of Legislative Council Andhra Pradesh
- In office 2011-2017
- Constituency: Assembly Constituency

Personal details
- Party: Telugu Desam Party
- Other political affiliations: Indian National Congress

Bathyala Changal Rayudu S/o Subbaiah Rayudu (born in 1956) is an Andhra Pradesh politician, Telugu Desam Party leader.

== Career ==
- Rayudu represented as Member of Legislative Council in Andhra Pradesh from Indian National Congress Party during 2011–2017. He contested from Rajampet (Assembly constituency) in 2019 from Telugu Desam Party. He is associated with Telugu Desam Party now.
