= Mandipalli Ramprasad Reddy =

Indian politician

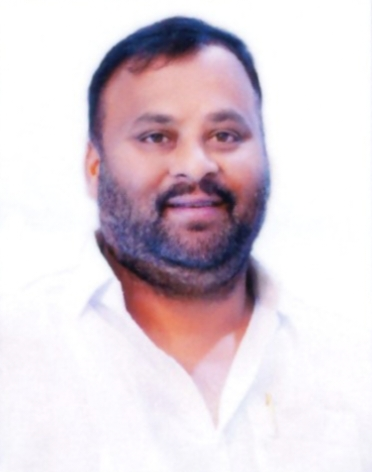
- Official portrait, 2024

Minister of Transport Government of Andhra Pradesh
- Incumbent
- Assumed office 12 June 2024
- Governor: S. Abdul Nazeer
- Chief Minister: N. Chandrababu Naidu
- Preceded by: Pinipe Viswarup

Minister of Youth and Sports Government of Andhra Pradesh
- Incumbent
- Assumed office 12 June 2024
- Governor: S. Abdul Nazeer
- Chief Minister: N. Chandrababu Naidu
- Preceded by: R. K. Roja

Member of the Andhra Pradesh Legislative Assembly
- Incumbent
- Assumed office 4 June 2024
- Preceded by: Gadikota Srikanth Reddy
- Constituency: Rayachoti

Personal details
- Party: Telugu Desam Party
- Other political affiliations: Indian National Congress; Jai Samaikyandhra Party

Mandipalli Ramprasad Reddy is an Indian politician from Andhra Pradesh. He has been a member of the Telugu Desam Party since 2021. He won the 2024 Andhra Pradesh Legislative Assembly election from Rayachoti Assembly Constituency. He is currently a cabinet minister in the Government of Andhra Pradesh.
