= Koramutla Sreenivasulu =

Indian politician

Koramutla Srinivasulu (born 6 July 1971) is an Indian politician from Andhra Pradesh. He is an MLA of YSR Congress Party from Kodur Assembly constituency which is reserved for SC community in the erstwhile Kadapa district that is renamed as Annamayya district in 2022. He won the 2019 Andhra Pradesh Legislative Assembly election. However, he lost the 2024 Andhra Pradesh Legislative Assembly election on YSR Congress Party ticket.

== Early life and education ==
Srinivasulu was born in Reddivaripalli, Kodur mandal, Annamayya district. His father's name is Koramutla Gangaiah. He is an advocate. He completed his post graduation in Master of Law in 2000 and later did his MA from Sri Venkateswara University in 2002.

== Career ==
Srinivasulu began his political career with Indian National Congress. He won the 2014 Andhra Pradesh Legislative Assembly election representing YSRCP from Kodur Assembly constituency defeating Obili Subbaramaiah of Telugu Desam Party by a narrow margin of 1,972 votes. He won the 2019 Andhra Pradesh Legislative Assembly election defeating Panthagani Narasimha Prasad of Telugu Desam Party by a margin of 34,879 votes. He also served as the government whip of YSR Congress Party. In the 2024 Andhra Pradesh Legislative Assembly election, he lost to Jana Sena Party candidate Arava Sreedhar by a margin of 11,101 votes.
