= Punganur =

Punganur Punganuru
- Town
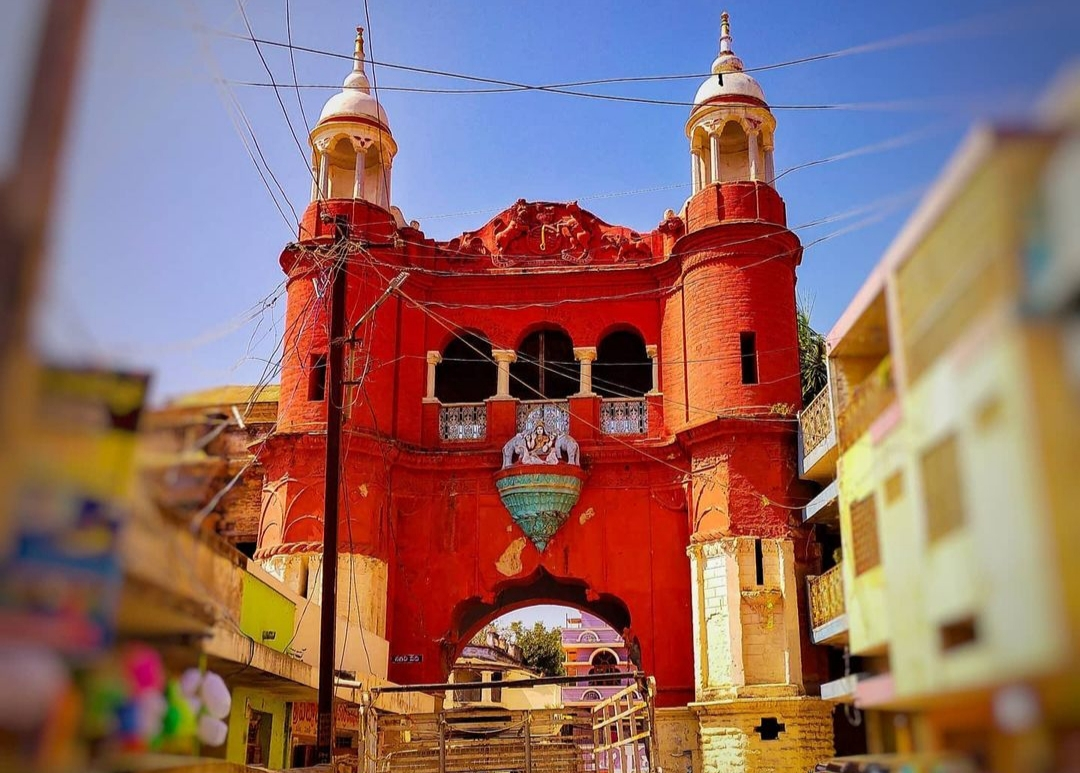
- Nicknames: Pungapuri, Pulinaadu
- Location in Andhra Pradesh, India
- Coordinates: 13.3667°N 78.5833°E
- Country: India
- State: Andhra Pradesh
- District: Annamayya
- Mandal: Punganur

Government
  - Type: Municipality
  - Body: Punganur Municipality

Area
  - Total: 32.28 km^{2} (12.46 sq mi)
- Elevation: 764 m (2,507 ft)

Population (2011)
  - Total: 54,746
  - Density: 1,696/km^{2} (4,393/sq mi)

Languages
  - Official: Telugu
- Time zone: UTC+5:30 (IST)
- PIN: 517 247
- Telephone code: +91–8581
- Vehicle registration: AP 03 AP 39
- Assembly Constituency: Punganur
- Lok Sabha Constituency: Rajampeta
- Website: Punganur Municipality

Punganur or Punganuru, is a Municipality in Annamayya district of the Indian state of Andhra Pradesh. It is the mandal headquarters of Punganur mandal in Madanapalle revenue division.

== Geography ==
Punganur is located at 13.3667°N 78.5833°E. It has an average elevation of 764 meters (2509 feet).

== Demographics ==
As of the 2011 India census, Punganur had a population of 54,746, with males constituting 49.7%(27,235) and females 50.3% (27,511). the town has an average literacy rate of 78.68%, which is higher than the state average of 67.02% : male literacy stands at 85.07% and female literacy is 72.40%. Children under 6 years of age make up 11.43% of the population. Due to the postponement of the official 2021 census of India, the population in 2026 is estimated to have grown to approximately 81,000.

== Governance ==
=== Civic administration ===
Punganur panchayat was upgraded to 3rd Grade Municipality on 19 January 1985, Punganur Municipality was upgraded from a 3rd Grade to a 2nd Grade municipality with 31 election wards on August 11, 2023. This change was made official through a government order (G.O. 95), recognizing the growth and development of the area, particularly in terms of population and infrastructure improvements.

=== Politics ===
Punganur Assembly constituency is a constituency of Andhra Pradesh Legislative Assembly and the constituency number is 165 in Rajampet Lok Sabha constituency. It is one of 7 Assembly constituencies in Annamayya district.

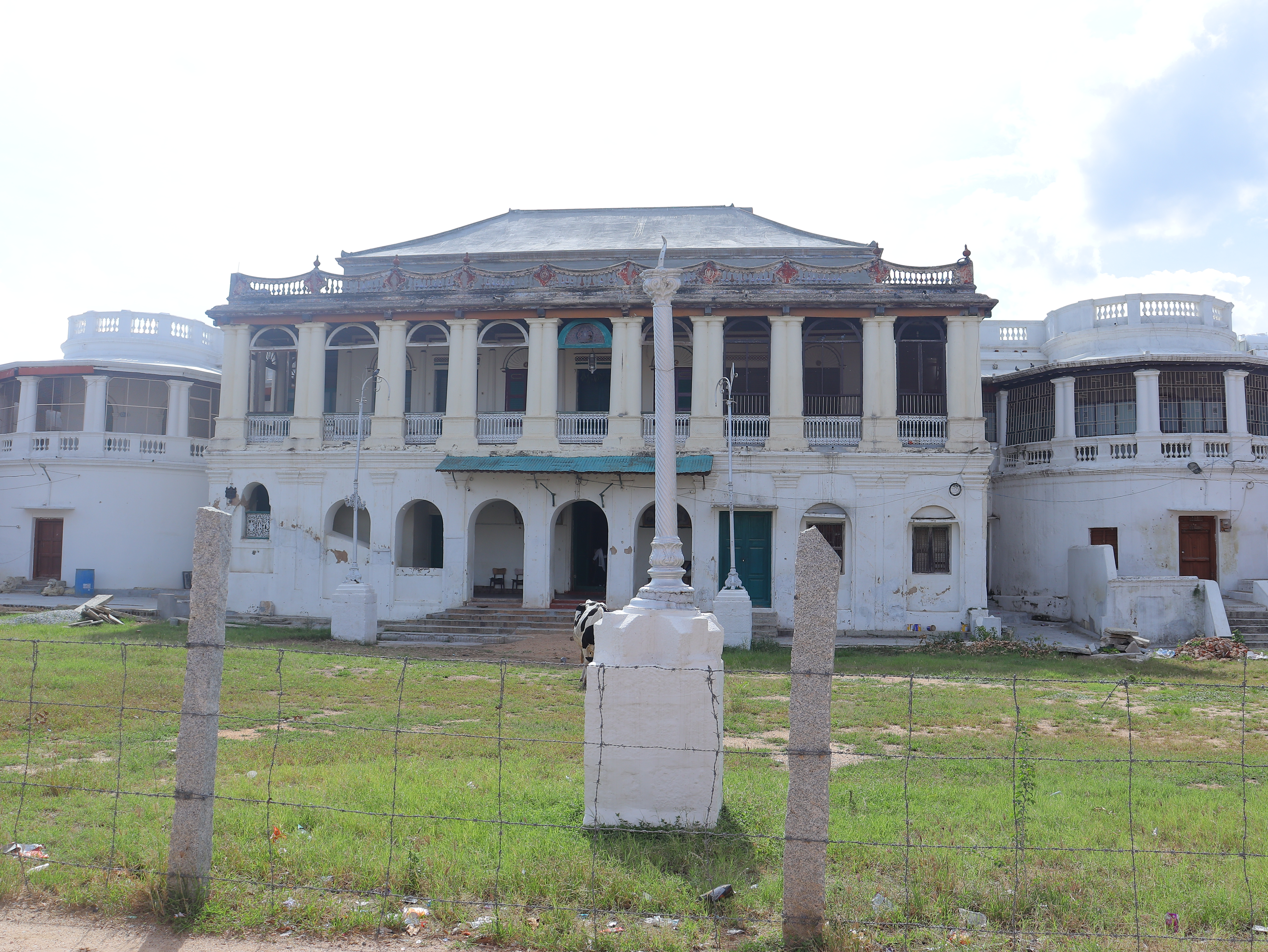
Punganur Zamindari Palace

== The Punganur cow ==
Punganuru githa

The Punganur cow is a distinct breed, named after the town of its origin. White and light grey in colour with a broad forehead and short horns, its average height is 70–90 cm and its weight is 115–200 kg. The cow has an average milk yield of 3 to 5 litres per day (with a fat content of 8%, whereas the normal milk has a fat content of 3.5%). Its daily feed intake of 5 kg. It is highly drought resistant, and able to survive exclusively on dry fodder. It is now on the verge of extinction.

== Temples ==
Sri Someswara Temple (situated within the precincts of the Zamindar Palace, once the centre of the Punganur Estate), also called Kukkudechuram or Kukkutasuram, is one of the Thevara Vaipputh Thalangal of the Shaivite holy places mentioned in his literature by Tamil Nayanar Appar, the saint-poet of the 7th century A.D. Together with Sambandhar and Sundara, Appar is one of the three most prominent of the 63 Nayanars. This temple was constructed by the Cholas.

Another notable temple is the Pundeswara Temple in Mugavadi near Punganur.

== Transport ==
Roadways

Punganur is well connected to major cities through National and State Highways. The National Highway through Punganur is, National Highway 42 (India) connecting Punganur with Madanapalle and Anantapur on North and connecting Krishnagiri on South. State Highway 65 (Andhra Pradesh) connecting Punganur with Chowdepalle, Somala, Sadum, Kallur, Pulicherla, and Rompicherla Mandals on East and the major junctions in this State Highway are National Highway 40 (India) at Kallur, and National Highway 71 (India) near Rompicherla.

NH 42 - Joladarashi (Karnataka) to Krishnagiri (Tamilnadu)

SH 65 - Punganur to Rompicharla

Public transport

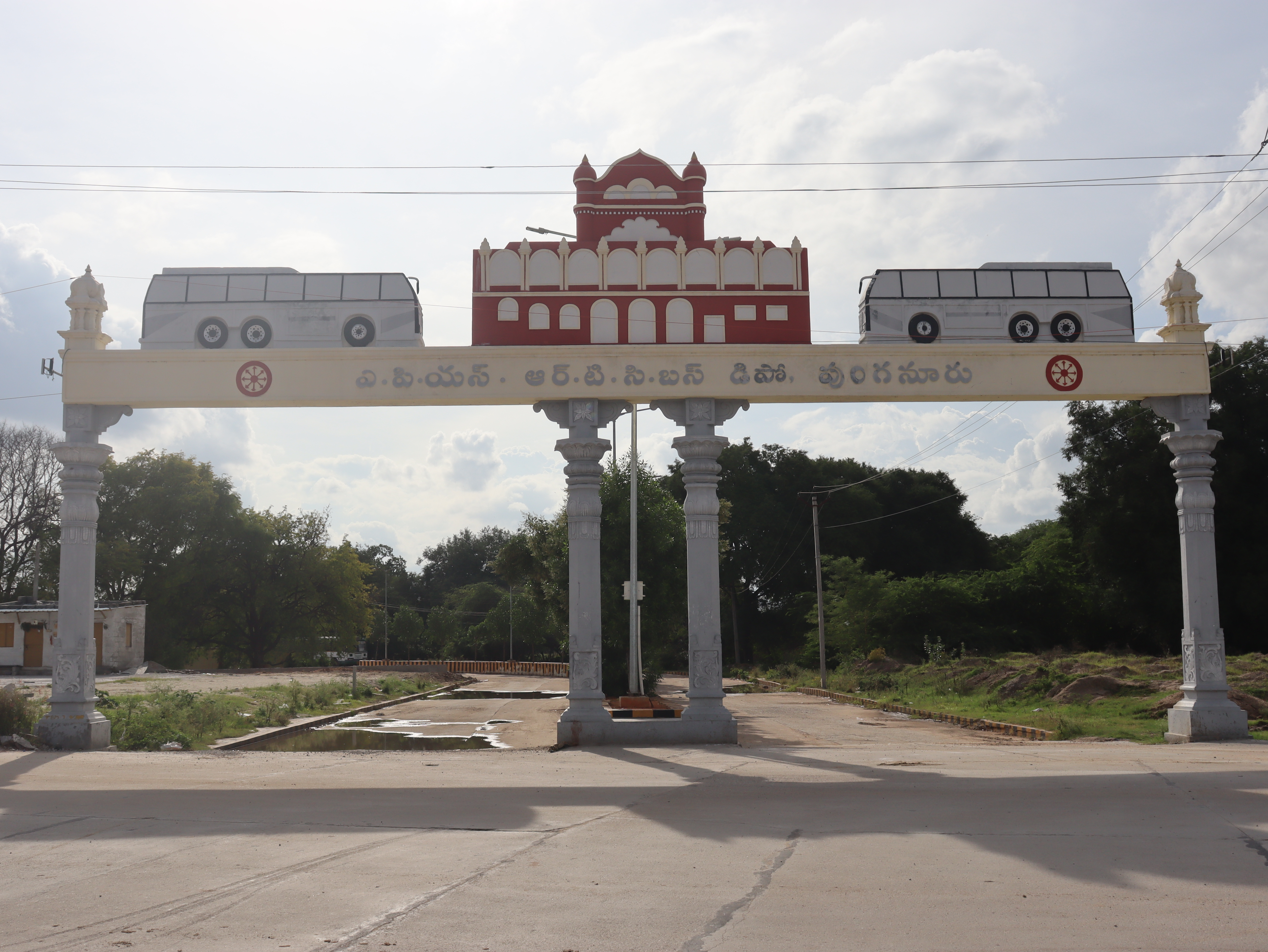
APS RTC Bus Depot Punganur

There are two bus terminals in Punganur. State owned Andhra Pradesh State Road Transport Corporation operates bus services from Punganur bus station to different parts of the district, state and interstate. Bus services are operated to Gaanugachinta, Challampalli, Pedda upparapalli, Baireddipalli, Vengamvaripalli, Chokkandlapalli, Kummaragunta, Naakerepalli, Gosuvaripalli, Naaganapalli, Metimandha, A.Kothakota, Dhoddipalli, Ramasamudram, Chowdepalle, Naayana Pakala, Pakala, Tirupati, Tirumala, Madanapalle, Kadiri, Palamaner, Chittoor, Kalikiri, Rayachoti, Piler, Kadapa, Nellore, Anantapur, Vijayawada, Hyderabad, Chennai, Bangalore, and also to the other major towns and cities in the Andhra Pradesh, Tamilnadu, Karnataka, and Telangana states.

Railways

Under the Kadapa-Bangalore railway project a railway line passes through Kudavuru, which is a town in Punganur mandal at an distance of 8 km (5.0 mi) from Punganur. After completion of this railway line Punganur will get railway station at Kudavuru. At present the nearest railway station is Madanapalle Road railway station in Chinna Tippa Samudram (CTM) village, which is located 36 km (22 mi) from Punganur.

Airports

The nearest airports are:

1) Kempegowda International Airport. IATA:BLR at Bangalore is about 123 Kms West.

2) Tirupati Airport at Renigunta in Tirupati, Andhra Pradesh, is about 132 kms East. IATA:TIR is at par with other major cities, but flights are operated in a limited fashion.

3) Chennai International Airport. IATA:MAA at Chennai is about 213 kms South-East.

== Education ==
The primary and secondary school education is delivered by government, aided and private schools, under the School Education Department of the state. The languages of instruction followed by different schools are Telugu, Urdu, Hindi and English.

Degree colleges:

- Subharam Government Degree College
- MCV Degree College
- RR Degree College
- Srinivasa Degree College
- SV Degree College
- HM Degree College

Polytechnic colleges:

- A.N.G.R.A.U:(Acharya N.G Ranga Agricultural University) Agricultural Polytechnic College

ITI Colleges:

- Government Minorities ITI College
- Mokshagundam Visweswaraiah Private ITI College

== Notable people ==
- Sapthagiri - Actor
- Vakkantham Vamsi - Screenwriter and Director
