= Pileru mandal =

Mandal in Annamayya district, Andhra Pradesh, India

Pileru Mandal
- Mandal
- Interactive Map Outlining mandal
- Location Of Pileru Mandal Headquarters
- Coordinates: 13.6549°N 78.9471°E
- Country: India
- State: Andhra Pradesh
- District: Annamayya
- Revenue division: Pileru
- Headquarters: Pileru
- Time zone: UTC+05:30 (IST)
- PIN: 5172XX

Pileru mandal is one of the 25 mandals in Annamayya district of the Indian state of Andhra Pradesh. It is administered under the Pileru revenue division, with its headquarters located at Pileru. The mandal is bounded by Pulicherla and Rompicherla mandals of Chittoor district, Yerravaripalem mandal of Tirupati district, and Kalikiri, and K. V. Palle, Sodam mandals of Annamayya district. Pileru mandal was formerly part of Chittoor district and became part of the newly formed Annamayya district on 4 April 2022, following the district reorganisation undertaken by the Government of Andhra Pradesh. The mandal continues to be administered under the Pileru revenue division, which was formed on 31 December 2025 as part of the district consolidation and administrative reorganisation carried out by the Government of Andhra Pradesh.

== Towns and villages ==
The settlements in the mandal are listed below:

1. Agraharam
2. Avuvaripalle
3. Bodumalluvaripalle
4. Doddipalle
5. Gudarevupalle
6. Jandla
7. Kavalapalle
8. Maddelacheruvu
9. Mellacheruvu
10. Mudupulavemula
11. Pileru
12. Regullu
13. Talupula
14. Vepulabylu
15. Yerraguntlapalle
