= Sodam (village) =

- Village
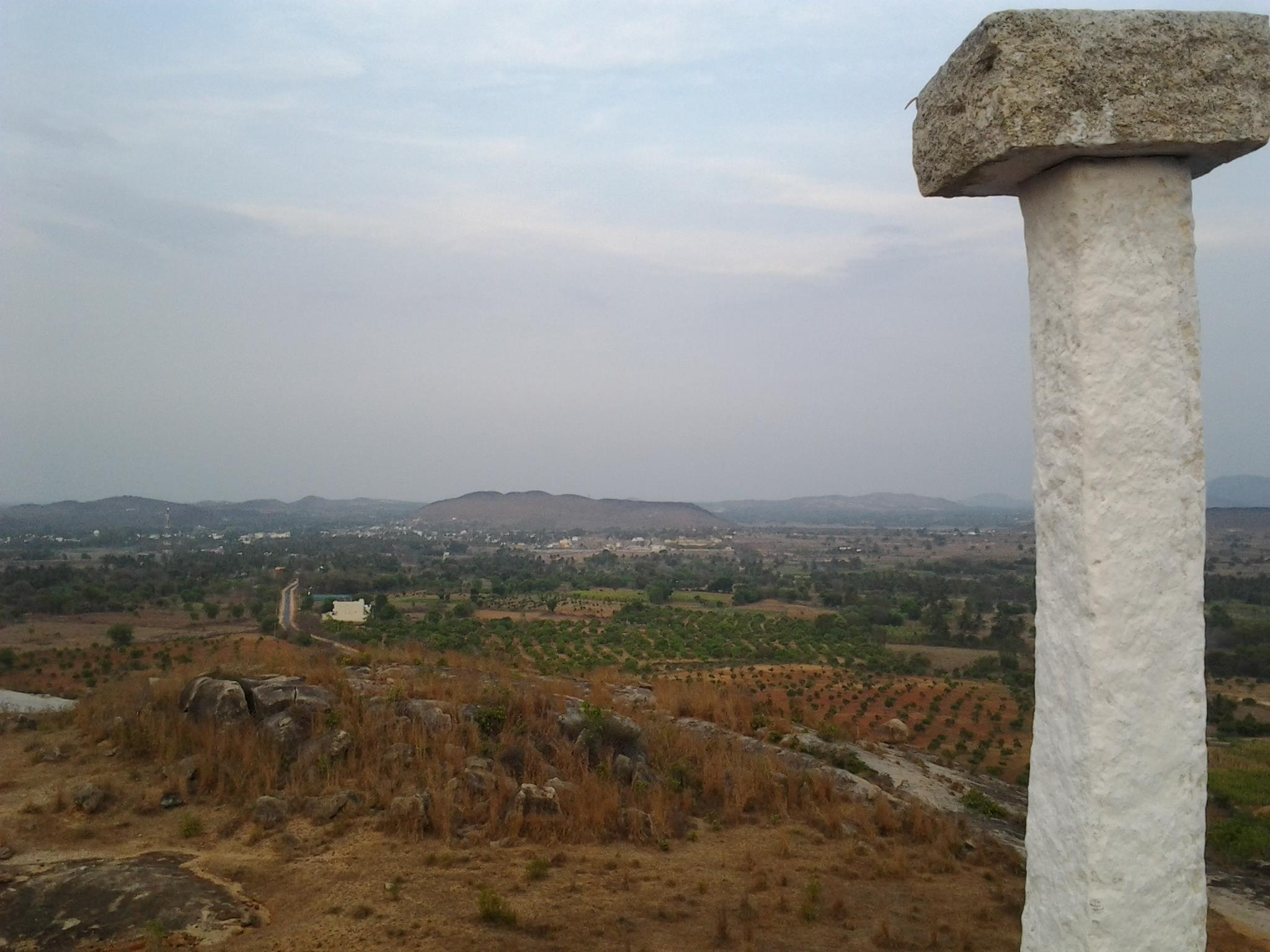
- Aerial view of Sodam seen from Seethamma Gutta.
- Interactive map of Sodam
- Location in Andhra Pradesh, India
- Coordinates: 13°32′51″N 78°54′27″E
- Country: India
- State: Andhra Pradesh
- District: Annamayya
- Mandal: Sodam

Government
  - Type: Panchayath
  - Body: Sarpanch

Area
  - Total: 3.04 km^{2} (1.17 sq mi)

Population (2011)
  - Total: 6,995
  - Density: 2,300/km^{2} (5,960/sq mi)

Languages
  - Official: Telugu
- Time zone: UTC+5:30 (IST)
- PIN: 517123
- Vehicle registration: AP03, AP39
- Educational institutions: ZP High school, Vinayaka Degree College
- Nearest city: Pileru
- Vidhan Sabha Constituency: Pileru
- Lok Sabha Constituency: Rajampeta
- RTO: AP403-Piler MVI Office

Sodam is a village in Sodam mandal of Annamayya district in the southern Indian state of Andhra Pradesh.
