= Galiveedu =

- Village
- Interactive map of Galiveedu
- Location in Andhra Pradesh, India
- Coordinates: 14.0333°N 78.5000°E
- Country: India
- State: Andhra Pradesh
- District: Annamayya
- Talukas: Galiveedu
- Elevation: 403 m (1,322 ft)

Languages
  - Official: Telugu
- Time zone: UTC+5:30 (IST)
- Postal code: 516267
- Vehicle registration: AP

Galiveedu is a village in Annamayya district of the Indian state of Andhra Pradesh. It is located in Galiveedu mandal of Rayachoti revenue division.

== Geography ==
Galiveedu is located at 14.0333°N 78.5000°E. It has an average elevation of 403 meters (1325 feet).
