= Chinnamandem =

- Small town
- Interactive map of Chinnamandem
- Location in Andhra Pradesh, India
- Coordinates: 13°56′31″N 78°40′53″E
- Country: India
- State: Andhra Pradesh
- District: Annamayya
- Mandal: Chinnamandyam

Languages
  - Official: Telugu
- Time zone: UTC+5:30 (IST)
- PIN: 516214
- Telephone code: 08561
- Vehicle registration: AP

Chinnamandem is a village in the Annamayya district of the Indian state of Andhra Pradesh. It is located in Chinnamandyam mandal of the Rayachoti revenue division.

== Geography ==
Chinnamandem has an elevation of 445m and lies on the Deccan Plateau.

== Transport ==
The National Highway 340 passes through the village, which connects Rayachoti and Madanapalli road of Andhra Pradesh.
