= Lakkireddipalle =

- Village
- Interactive map of Lakkireddipalle
- Location in Andhra Pradesh, India
- Coordinates: 14°11′05″N 78°42′00″E
- Country: India
- State: Andhra Pradesh
- District: Annamayya
- Talukas: Lakkireddipalle
- Elevation: 356 m (1,168 ft)

Languages
  - Official: Telugu
- Time zone: UTC+5:30 (IST)
- Vehicle registration: AP

Lakkireddipalle is a village in Annamayya district of the Indian state of Andhra Pradesh. It is located in Lakkireddypalli mandal of Rayachoti revenue division.

== Geography ==
Lakkireddipalle is located at 14.1667°N 78.7000°E. It has an average altitude of 356 meters (1,168 feet).
