= Ammagari Palle =

- Village
- Interactive map of Ammagari Palle
- Location in Andhra Pradesh, India
- Coordinates: 13°32′38″N 78°53′48″E
- Country: India
- State: Andhra Pradesh
- District: Annamayya

Languages
  - Official: Telugu
- Time zone: UTC+5:30 (IST)
- PIN: 517123

Ammagari Palle is a village located at a distance of around 1.5 kilometers from Sodam, Annamayya district, Andhra Pradesh. The village comes under Punganur constituency.As per the 2011 Census of India, Ammagari Palle has a total population of 3,247 residing in 819 households. The population consists of 1,626 males and 1,621 females, giving the village a sex ratio of 997 females per 1,000 males, which is higher than the state average.The village has a literacy rate of 70.36%, which is higher than the state average of 67.02%. Male literacy stands at 81.39%, while female literacy is 59.45%. The local economy is primarily agrarian, with a total workforce of 1,675 people, out of which the majority are engaged as agricultural cultivators and farm labourers.Primary education in Ammagari Palle is served by local Mandal Parishad Primary Schools (MPPS), while secondary education and higher schooling are accessible in the nearby mandal headquarters at Sodam, which houses government high schools and private institutions including Sri Vidyamandir High School.Ammagari Palle experiences a tropical wet and dry climate characteristic of the Rayalaseema region, with warm summers lasting from March to May and monsoon rains arriving between June and October from the South-West and South-East monsoons. Winters from November to February bring milder, pleasant temperatures ranging between 18 °C and 28 °C.Local entertainment and social life in the village revolve around traditional community festivals, rural sports, and agricultural celebrations such as Sankranti and local temple jataras, with residents traveling to larger nearby towns like Punganur and Madanapalle for cinema theatres and commercial shopping centers.Local entertainment and social life in the village revolve around traditional community festivals, rural sports, and agricultural celebrations such as Sankranti and local temple jataras, with residents traveling to larger nearby towns like Punganur and Madanapalle for cinema theatres and commercial shopping centers.[8]
