= Pileru revenue division =

Revenue division in Annamayya district, Andhra Pradesh, India

- Revenue division in Annamayya district
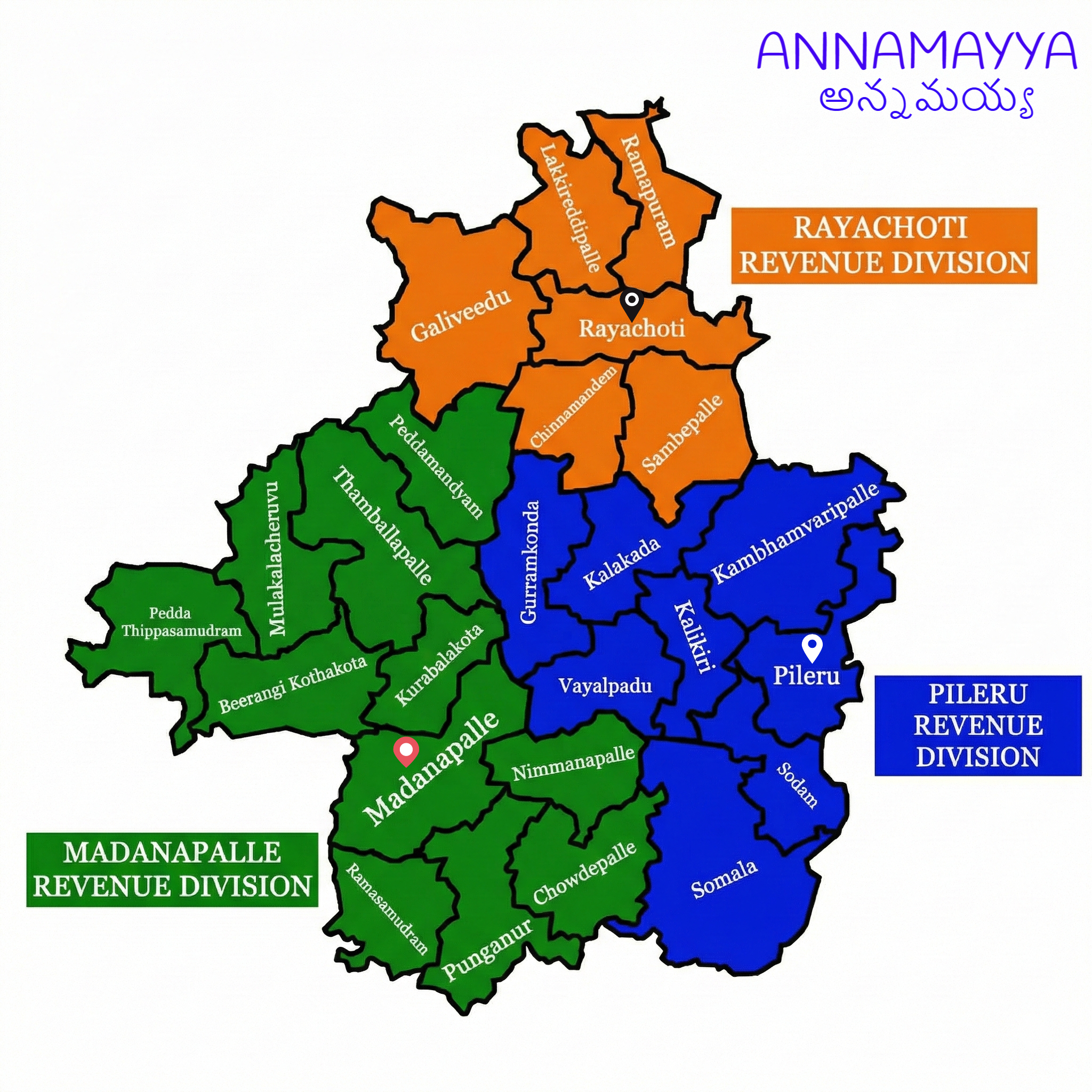
- Revenue divisions in Annamayya district
- Country: India
- State: Andhra Pradesh
- District: Annamayya
- Formed: 31 December 2025
- Headquarters: Pileru
- Time zone: UTC+05:30 (IST)

Pileru revenue division is an administrative division in the Annamayya district of the Indian state of Andhra Pradesh. It is one of the three revenue divisions in the district and comprises eight mandals. The division was formed on 31 December 2025 as part of the district consolidation and administrative reorganisation undertaken by the Government of Andhra Pradesh during the 2025 restructuring of districts.

== Mandals ==
Map showing mandals in Pileru revenue division.

== Administration ==
The revenue division comprises eight mandals:

1. Gurramkonda
2. Kalakada
3. Kalikiri
4. Kambhamvaripalle
5. Pileru
6. Sodam
7. Somala
8. Vayalpad

== See also ==
- List of revenue divisions in Andhra Pradesh
- List of mandals in Andhra Pradesh
- Madanapalle revenue division
- Rayachoti revenue division
