= Marripadu, Annamayya district =

Marripadu
- Village
- Interactive map of Marripadu
- Location in Andhra Pradesh, India
- Coordinates: 13.65°N 78.72°E
- Country: India
- State: Andhra Pradesh
- District: Annamayya
- Mandal: Gurramkonda

Population (2011)
  - Total: 3,416

Languages
  - Official: Telugu & Urdu
- Time zone: UTC+5:30 (IST)

Marripadu is a village in Annamayya district of the Indian state of Andhra Pradesh. It is located in Gurramkonda mandal.

== Demographics ==
Telugu is the Local Language here. Total population of Marripadu is 3416. There are 1,747 men and 1,669 women living in 762 houses. Total area of Marripadu is 1331 hectares.

== Geography ==
13.652°N 78.7161°E.
