= Kosuvaripalle =

- Village
- Interactive map of Kosuvaripalle
- Location in Andhra Pradesh, India
- Coordinates: 13°45′40″N 78°25′30″E
- Country: India
- State: Andhra Pradesh
- District: Annamaya
- Mandal: Thamballapalle
- Panchayathi: Kosuvaripalle

Population (2011)
  - Total: 6,271

Languages
  - Official: Telugu
- Time zone: UTC+5:30 (IST)

Kosuvaripalle is a village in the Annamaya district of the Indian state of Andhra Pradesh. It is located in the Thamballapalle mandal.

== Administration ==
Kosuvaripalle is administered by a gram panchayat.

== Demographics ==
As of 2011 Census of India, the village had a population of 6,271. The total population village, 3,080 males, 3,191 females. Total house holders in the village are 1,471. The average literacy rate stands at 64%.

== Economy ==
The economy is based on agriculture and main products include tomato, mango, groundnut, tamarind and silk. Tomatoes and other agriculture products from here are supplied to the Madanapalle Market. Kosuvari Palle is also famous for custard apple, which come from surrounding hills and agricultural fields.

== Education ==
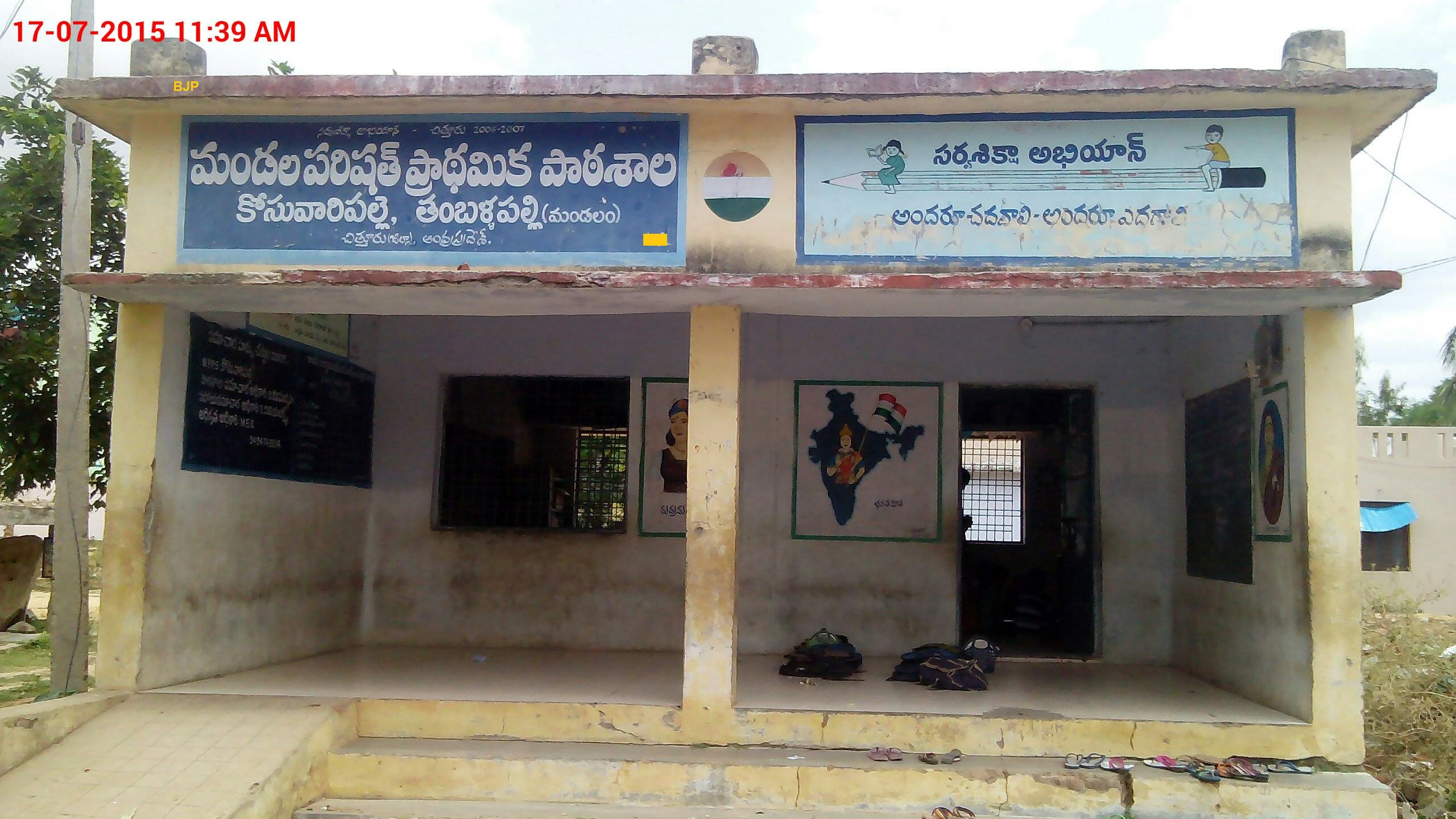
MPP School, Kosuvari Palle

ZPH School is the oldest educational institute, it was founded in earlier 60's. There are many MPP Schools in Kosuvaripalle surrounding villages.
