= Turupupalli =

- village
- Interactive map of Turupupalli
- Location in Andhra Pradesh, India Turupupalli (India)
- Coordinates: 13°37′14.54″N 78°41′56.73″E
- Country: India
- State: Andhra Pradesh
- District: Annamayya
- Mandal: Kambhamvaripalle

Languages
  - Official: Telugu
- Time zone: UTC+5:30 (IST)
- Nearest city: Vayalpadu

Turupupalli is a village located on the banks of the river Bahuda in Kambhamvaripalle mandal, Annamayya district in the state of Andhra Pradesh, India.

It is served by Vadlakunta B.O of India Post."Pin code".
