= Somala =

- village
- Interactive map of Somala
- Location in Andhra Pradesh, India Somala (India)
- Coordinates: 13.4667°N 78.8167°E
- Country: India
- State: Andhra Pradesh
- District: Annamayya
- Mandal: Somala

Languages
  - Official: Telugu
- Time zone: UTC+5:30 (IST)
- PIN: 517257
- Telephone code: +91–8583
- Vehicle registration: AP 03, AP 39
- Nearest Cities: Pileru, Punganur
- Assembly Constituency: Punganur
- Lok Sabha Constituency: Rajampeta

Somala is a village in Annamayya district of the Indian state of Andhra Pradesh. It is the mandal headquarters of Somala mandal.

== Geography ==
Somala is located at 13.4667°N 78.8167°E. It has an average elevation of 610 meters (2004 feet).

Per 2011 Census, Somala mandal has 13 major villages in it. 1 Avulapalle 2 Irikipenta 3 Kamireddivaripalle 4 Kandur 5 Mittapalle 6 Nanjampeta 7 Nellimanda 8 Peddauppara Palle 9 S. Nadim Palle 10 Somala Village (Harijanawada) 11 Thamminayanipalle 12 Upparapalle 13 Valligatla

Somala is located on the state route between Tirupati and Punganur.
