= Pottemvari palli =

- Village
- Interactive map of Pottemvari palli
- Location in Andhra Pradesh, India Pottemvari palli (India)
- Coordinates: 13°31′06″N 78°52′55″E
- Country: India
- State: Andhra Pradesh
- District: Annamayya

Population (2011)
  - Total: near to 1,000

Languages
  - Official: Telugu
- Time zone: UTC+5:30 (IST)
- PIN: 517123

Pottem Vari Palli is a village in the Sodam Mandal in Annamayya district of the state of Andhra Pradesh.
