= Manchuru =

Manchuru Manchur
- Village
- Interactive map of Manchuru
- Country: India
- State: Andhra Pradesh
- District: Annamayya
- Mandal: Vayalpadu

Government
  - Body: Gram panchayat

Area
  - Total: 15.73 km^{2} (6.07 sq mi)

Population
  - Total: 2,447
  - Density: 173/km^{2} (450/sq mi)

Manchuru is a village in Vayalpadu mandal, Annamayya district of Andhra Pradesh state, located in India. It is administered by a village panchayat. In the 2011 Census it had a population of 2,245.

== Traditions ==
The temples of Ananthapuramma with Her image in human form, Anjaneya, Someswara Swamy and Sri Rama are the places of worship in the village. Ananthapuramma Dhinnemeeda Tirunala is celebrated for two days on Phalguna Suddha Sapthami and Ashtami (February - March). Animals are sacrificed to the deity. Devotees liquidate their vows. For the past 10 years it is being celebrated and is limited to this village. Kamma community patronize the festival. All local communities participate.

== History ==
The village was historically a feudal fiefdom, and, was a Zamindari Estate during the rule of the British Raj. The village was ruled by Reddy chieftains from the Kalikiri-Reddy Clan. The head of the ruling family bore the hereditary title of Raja. The last ruling Raja of Manchuru (styled title) was Venkataswamy Kalikiri-Reddy.
