= Rompicherla =

Rompicherla may refer to:

- Rompicherla, Chittoor district, a village in the Chittoor district, Andhra Pradesh, India
- Rompicherla, Guntur district, a village in the Guntur district, Andhra Pradesh, India
