= Gudarevu Palli =

- village
- Interactive map of Gudarevu Palli
- Location in Andhra Pradesh, India Gudarevu Palli (India)
- Coordinates: 13.6642885°N 78.9712451°E
- Country: India
- State: Andhra Pradesh
- District: Annamayya

Languages
  - Official: Telugu
- Time zone: UTC+5:30 (IST)
- Vehicle registration: AP

Gudarevu Palli is a small village in Pileru Mandal, Andhra Pradesh, India.
