= Chowdepalle =

- Village
- Interactive map of Chowdepalle
- Location in Andhra Pradesh, India Chowdepalle (India)
- Coordinates: 13°26′03″N 78°41′29″E
- Country: India
- State: Andhra Pradesh
- District: Annamayya
- Mandal: ChowdepalleChowdepalle

Population (2011)
  - Total: 6,911

Languages
  - Official: Telugu
- Time zone: UTC+5:30 (IST)
- PIN: 517257
- Telephone code: +91–8581
- Vehicle registration: AP
- Sex ratio: 0.993 ♂/♀ Nearest Cities
- Assembly Constituency: Punganur, Madanapalle
- Lok Sabha Constituency: Punganur

Chowdepalle is a village in Chowdepalli mandal, Annamayya district of the Indian state of Andhra Pradesh. It is the mandal headquarters of Chowdepalli mandal.

== Demographics ==
As per 2011 census, there are 1542 households with a total population of 6911 in the village of Chowdepalle. Out of this 3467 are females and 3444 are males.
