= Marripadu =

Marripadu may refer to:

- Marripadu, Chittoor district village
- Marripadu, Nellore district village
