= Samakotavari palle =

- village
- Country: India
- State: Andhra Pradesh
- State: Annamayya
- Mandal: Nimmanapalle

Languages
  - Official: Telugu
- Time zone: UTC+5:30 (IST)
- Vehicle registration: AP

Samakotavaripalle is a hamlet within the Agraharam, Nimmanapalli mandal village in the Nimmanapalli mandal in Annamayya district (Andhra Pradesh, India. In the 2011 census it had 109 households.
