= K. V. Palle mandal =

Mandal in Annamayya district, Andhra Pradesh, India

Kambhamvaripalle mandal K. V. Palle mandal
- Mandal
- Interactive map of Kambhamvaripalle mandal
- Country: India
- State: Andhra Pradesh
- District: Annamayya
- Revenue division: Pileru
- Time zone: UTC+05:30 (IST)

Kambhamvaripalle mandal, commonly known as K. V. Palle mandal, is one of the 30 mandals in Annamayya district in the Indian state of Andhra Pradesh. It is a part of Pileru revenue division. The mandal used to be a part of Chittoor district and was made part of the newly formed Annamayya district on 4 April 2022.
