= Kambhamvaripalle =

Kambhamvaripalle K. V. Palle
- Village
- Interactive map of Kambhamvaripalle
- Location in Andhra Pradesh, India
- Coordinates: 13°48′27″N 78°54′12″E
- Country: India
- State: Andhra Pradesh
- District: Annamayya
- Mandal: Kambhamvaripalle

Languages
  - Official: Telugu
- Time zone: UTC+5:30 (IST)
- PIN: 517213
- Vehicle registration: AP 03, AP 39
- Nearest City: Pileru
- Assembly Constituency: Pileru
- Lok Sabha Constituency: Rajampeta

Kambhamvaripalle is a village in the Annamayya district of the Indian state of Andhra Pradesh.
