= Chintaparthi =

Chinthaparthi
- Interactive map of Chinthaparthi
- Location in Andhra Pradesh, India
- Coordinates: 13.643922°N 78.706323°E
- Country: India
- State: Andhra Pradesh
- District: Annamayya

Languages
  - Official: Telugu and Urdu
- Time zone: UTC+5:30 (IST)
- PIN: 517277
- Vehicle registration: ap03
- Nearest city: Madanapalli
- Vidhan Sabha constituency: Pileru
- Website: www.chintaparthi.tk

Chintaparthi is a major Panchayathi in Valmikipuram Mandal (previously Vayalpadu Mandal) on the Madanapalle-Tirupathi Highway in Annamayya district of the Indian state of Andhra Pradesh.

In the 2011 census it had a population of 7468 in 1951 households.
