= Jai Samaikyandhra Party =

Defunct Indian political party

- Abbreviation: JSP
- Founder: N. Kiran Kumar Reddy
- Founded: 11 March 2014 (12 years ago)
- Dissolved: 13 July 2018 (8 years ago)
- Split from: Indian National Congress
- Merged into: Indian National Congress
- Headquarters: Hyderabad, Telangana, India
- Ideology: Populism; Regionalism
- Colours: Green
- ECI status: Dissolved

Election symbol
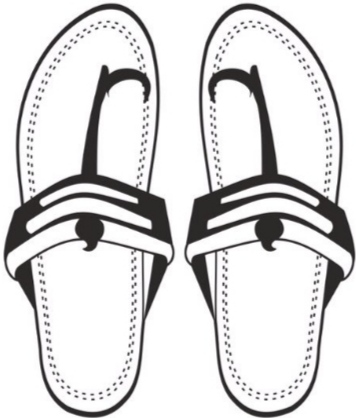
- A Pair of Slipper

Jai Samaikyandhra Party (abbr. JSP; transl. Victory to United Andhra Party) was a regional political party in the Indian state of Andhra Pradesh. It was founded by N. Kiran Kumar Reddy, former and last Chief Minister of the undivided Andhra Pradesh, after breaking away from the Indian National Congress (INC) on 12 March 2014. The party was formed in protest against the Andhra Pradesh Reorganisation Bill, which led to the formation of the state of Telangana, and advocated the rollback of the bifurcation. In the subsequent election, the party failed to make any electoral impact, winning no seats. The party was dissolved on 13 July 2018, with Reddy himself re-joining the INC.

== History ==
Following the passage of the Andhra Pradesh Reorganisation Bill, which led to the formation of the state of Telangana, N. Kiran Kumar Reddy resigned as Chief Minister and from the INC in protest against the bifurcation of Andhra Pradesh. On 7 March 2014, he announced his intention to form a new political party. The party was formally launched on 11 March 2014, with its first public meeting in Rajahmundry, which stated the objective of opposing the division of the state and supporting the Samaikyandhra Movement, advocating for its re-unification. Prior to the formation of the party, Reddy had publicly expressed his opposition to bifurcation through press conferences while still serving as the Chief Minister. Several former INC leaders, including Sabbam Hari, Vundavalli Aruna Kumar, G. V. Harsha Kumar, Pithani Satyanarayana and Sake Sailajanath, joined the party at the time of its formation and were appointed to leadership positions.

The party contested the 2014 Andhra Pradesh Legislative Assembly election but failed to create any impact, winning no seats. Reddy himself did not contest the polls, instead fielding his brother N. Kishore Kumar Reddy from the Pileru Assembly constituency. After the elections, the party's activity gradually declined. On 13 July 2018, Reddy re-joined the INC, leading to the merger and dissolution of the party.

== Electoral performance ==
Lok Sabha elections
Year	Lok Sabha	Party leader	Seats contested	Seats won	Change in seats	(%) of votes	Vote swing	Popular vote	Outcome
2014	16th	N. Kiran Kumar Reddy	27	0 / 543	new	0.31	new	204,260	Lost

Andhra Pradesh Legislative Assembly elections
Year	Assembly	Party leader	Seats contested	Seats won	Change in seats	(%) of votes	Vote swing	Popular vote	Outcome
2014	14th	N. Kiran Kumar Reddy	167	0 / 294	new	0.46	new	220,734	Lost

== See also ==
- Politics of India
- Elections in India
- Politics of Andhra Pradesh
- Elections in Andhra Pradesh
- List of political parties in India
