= Pulicherla mandal =

- Mandal
- Interactive Map Outlining mandal
- Location in Andhra Pradesh, India
- Coordinates: 13°24′16″N 78°57′31″E
- Country: India
- State: Andhra Pradesh
- District: Chittoor
- Headquarters: Reddivaripalle

Government
  - Body: Mandal Parishad
  - MPP: Desireddysurendranathreddy (YSRCP)

Population (2011)
  - Total: 37,108

Languages
  - Official: Telugu
- Time zone: UTC+5:30 (IST)
- Nearest City: Pileru
- Assembly Constituency: Punganur
- Lok Sabha Constituency: Rajampeta

Pulicherla mandal is one of the 66 mandals in Chittoor district of the Indian state of Andhra Pradesh.

== Geography ==
The mandal headquarters are located at Reddivaripalle. The mandal is bounded by Chinnagottigallu, Chandragiri, Rompicherla, Pakala, Pileru, Sodam and Irala mandals. Pulichelra is located between Kalluru and Rompicherla road.

== Infrastructure ==
Village has a railway station. The train route connects Dharmavaram and Tirupati. The only Bank available in the village is an Indian bank with an ATM facility and One SBI ATM also available. Pulicherla had a nutrine chocolate factory, it was closed long back.

== Demographics ==
The 2011 census shows that the mandal had a population of 37,108. The total population consists of 18,742 males and 18,366 females —a sex ratio of 978 females per 1000 males. 3,598 children are in the age group of 0–6 years, of which 1,857 are boys and 1,741 are girls. The average literacy rate stands at 67.49% with 22,617 literates.

== Towns and villages ==
As of 2011 census, the mandal has 24 villages.

The settlements in the mandal are listed below:

- Ayyavandlapalle
- Bandaruvaripalle
- Bodireddigaripalle
- Devalampet
- E.Ramireddigari Palle
- Gaddamvaripalle
- Muppireddigaripalle
- Kallur
- Kavetigaripalle
- Mangalampeta
- Ramireddigaripalle
- Rayavaripalle
- Reddivaripalle †
- Vallivetivaripalle
- Venkatadasari Palle
- Yellankivaripallle
- Vagallavaripalli
- Desireddigaripalli
- Balireddigaripalli
- Kammapalli
- Kokkuvaripalli
- Palem
- Vankayalapativaripalli
- Bestapalli

† – Mandal Headquarters

== See also ==
- List of mandals in Andhra Pradesh
