= Punganur Assembly constituency =

Constituency of the Andhra Pradesh Legislative Assembly, India

Coordinates: 13.37°N 78.57°E

Punganur
- Constituency No. 165 for the Andhra Pradesh Legislative Assembly
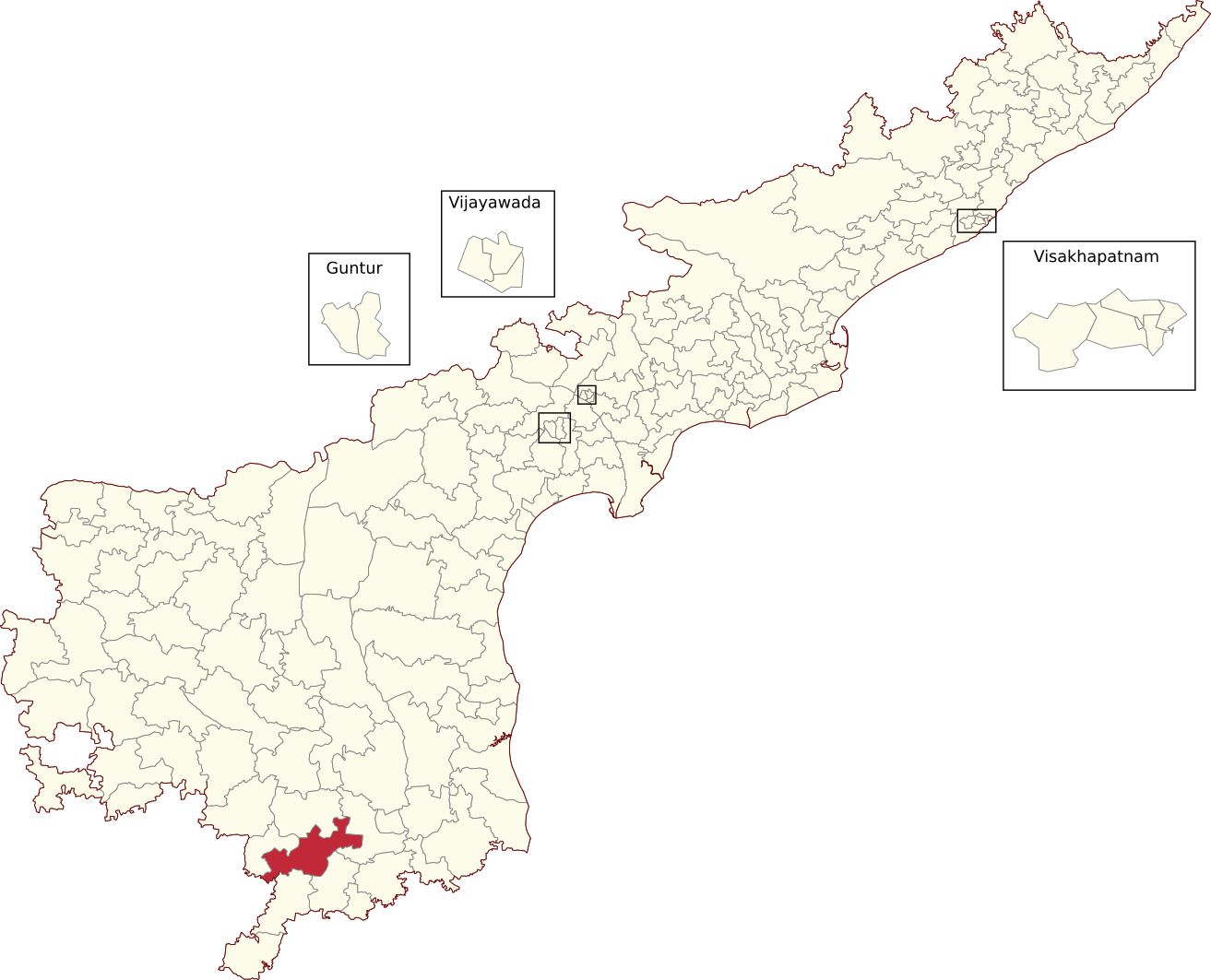
- Location of Punganur Assembly constituency within Andhra Pradesh

Constituency details
- Country: India
- Region: South India
- State: Andhra Pradesh
- District: Annamayya; Chittoor
- Lok Sabha constituency: Rajampet
- Established: 1951
- Total electors: 229,261
- Reservation: None

Member of Legislative Assembly
- 16th Andhra Pradesh Legislative Assembly
- Incumbent Peddireddy Ramachandra Reddy
- Party: YSRCP
- Alliance: None
- Elected year: 2024

Punganur Assembly constituency is a constituency in Annamayya district and Chittoor district of Andhra Pradesh that elects represtatives to the Andhra Pradesh Legislative Assembly in India. It is one of seven assembly segments of Rajampet Lok Sabha constituency.

Peddireddy Ramachandra Reddy is the current MLA, having won the 2019 Andhra Pradesh Legislative Assembly election from YSR Congress Party. As of 25 March 2019, there are a total of 229,261 electors in the constituency. The constituency was established in 1951, as per Delimination Orders (1951).

== Mandals ==
Mandal	District
Sodam	Annamayya
Somala	Annamayya
Chowdepalle	Annamayya
Punganur	Annamayya
Pulicherla	Chittoor
Rompicherla	Chittoor

== Members of the Legislative Assembly ==
Year	Member	Political party
1952	B. Krishnamurthy rao	Indian National Congress
1955	Y.B.V. Chikarayalu	Independent
1962	V. Ramaswami Reddy	Indian National Congress
1967	V. Ramaswami Reddy	Indian National Congress
1970 by-election	B. Rani Sundarmani	Indian National Congress
1972	B. Rani Sundarmani	Indian National Congress
1978	K. V. Pati	Indian National Congress (I)
1983	Baggidi Gopal	Telugu Desam Party
1985	Nuthanakalva Ramakrishna Reddy	Telugu Desam Party
1989	Nuthanakalva Ramakrishna Reddy	Telugu Desam Party
1994	Nuthanakalva Ramakrishna Reddy	Telugu Desam Party
1996 by-election	N. Amarnath Reddy	Telugu Desam Party
1999	N. Sreedhar Reddy	Indian National Congress
2004	N. Amarnath Reddy	Telugu Desam Party
2009	Peddireddy Ramachandra Reddy	Indian National Congress
2014	Peddireddy Ramachandra Reddy	YSR Congress Party
2019	Peddireddy Ramachandra Reddy	YSR Congress Party
2024	Peddireddy Ramachandra Reddy	YSR Congress Party

== Election results ==
=== 1952 ===
1952 Madras Legislative Assembly election: Punganur
Party	Candidate	Votes	%	±%
INC	B. Krishnamoorthy Rao	21,059	45.19%	
Independent	Varanasi Raghunatha Reddi	19,737	42.35%	
KMPP	Peddivari Vankata Reddi	5,807	12.46%	
Margin of victory		1,322	2.84%	
Turnout		46,603	62.41%	
Registered electors		74,675		
INC win (new seat)				

=== 2009 ===
2009 Andhra Pradesh Legislative Assembly election: Punganur
Party	Candidate	Votes	%	±%
INC	Peddireddy Ramachandra Reddy	84,083	51.64	−1.58
TDP	M Venkatramana Raju	43,356	26.63	−7.73
PRP	Vantela Khadar Bhasha	25,891	15.9	
Majority		40,727	25.01	
Turnout		1,61,127	83.39	
INC gain from TDP		Swing		

=== 2014 ===
2014 Andhra Pradesh Legislative Assembly election: Punganur
Party	Candidate	Votes	%	±%
YSRCP	Peddireddy Ramachandra Reddy	104,587	56.47	▲6.55
TDP	M. Venkataramana Raju	72,856	39.34	▼4.7
Majority		31,731	17.13	
Turnout		1,85,213	84.10	
YSRCP gain from INC		Swing		

=== 2019 ===
2019 Andhra Pradesh Legislative Assembly election: Punganur
Party	Candidate	Votes	%	±%
YSRCP	Peddireddy Ramachandra Reddy	107,000	54.85	▼1.58
TDP	N. Anesha Reddy	63,876	32.61	▼7.73
JSP	Bode Ramachandra Yadav	16,452	8.4	
Majority		42,710	22.24	
Turnout		1,95,868	87	
YSRCP hold		Swing		

=== 2024 ===
2024 Andhra Pradesh Legislative Assembly election: Punganur
Party	Candidate	Votes	%	±%
YSRCP	Peddireddy Ramachandra Reddy	99,774	48.07	▼
TDP	Challa Ramachandra Reddy (Babu)	93,155	45.16	▲
Bharata Chaitanya Yuvajana Party	Bode Ramachandra Yadav	4423	2.17	
INC	Dr. G Murali Mohan Yadav	3546	1.7	
NOTA	None Of The Above	2884	1.39	
Majority		6619	3.19	
Turnout		206911		
YSRCP hold		Swing		

== See also ==
- List of constituencies of Andhra Pradesh Vidhan Sabha
