= Punganur Estate =

Zamindari in Andhra Pradesh, India

Punganur
- Zamindari of British India
- c.1300–1952
- Capital: Punganur
- History
  - Established: 12 March
  - Disestablished: 1952
Succeeded by
Republic of India
- Today part of: Andhra Pradesh, India

Punganur (also known as Poonganur, Punuguru and Punganuru) was a prominent Zamindari estate in the town of the same name, Andhra Pradesh, India. It was established by the Morasu Vokkaliga chieftain Timme Gowda.

== Palace ==
The estate's namesake palace is a landmark of Punganur. It was constructed in the year 1866 and served as the housing for the ruling family.

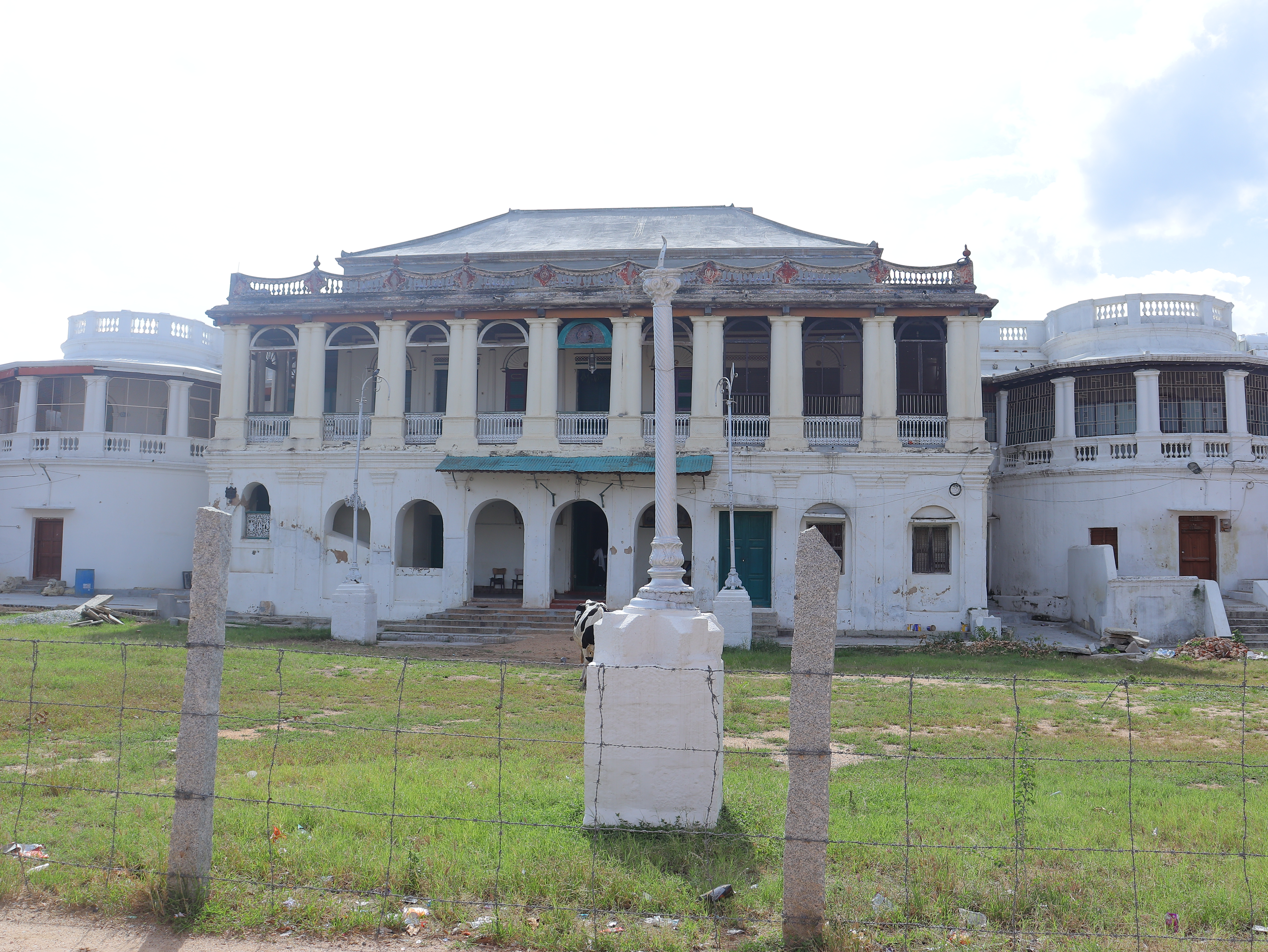
Punganur Palace

== History ==
Historians believe that the region of Punganur had trading links with the Mediterranean empires during the times of Emperor Ashoka.

The Punganur zamindari was established by a Morasu Vokkaliga polygar Timme Gowda. In the early 16th century, when the Penukonda region came under the attack of the invaders, the local rulers of Punganur were said to have assisted emperor Sri Krishnadevaraya to fight against it. As a gesture, the Vijayanagara emperor gave the Kolar and Suguturu regions to the Punganur rulers, which eventually led to the birth of the zamindari pattern of administration.

== Rulers ==
The estate's rulers bore the title of Raja (the female counterpart being Rani).

=== List of rulers ===
- Thimmaraya II
- Chikkathimmaraya
- Veerabasava Chikarayala Yaswanta Bahadur
- Chikkabasavaraya III

== Etymology ==
The estate and town are named after a local deity Punganuru or Pungamma, who is believed to have saved the town from huge floods. To this day the four reservoirs round the town are named after her, her sisters Subbamma and Rangamma and her brother Royappa, who are said to have dug and built them. They are the principal means of maintaining a stable groundwater level around the town.
