= Pileru Assembly constituency =

Constituency of the Andhra Pradesh Legislative Assembly, India

Coordinates: 13.67°N 78.94°E

Pileru
- Constituency No. 163 for the Andhra Pradesh Legislative Assembly
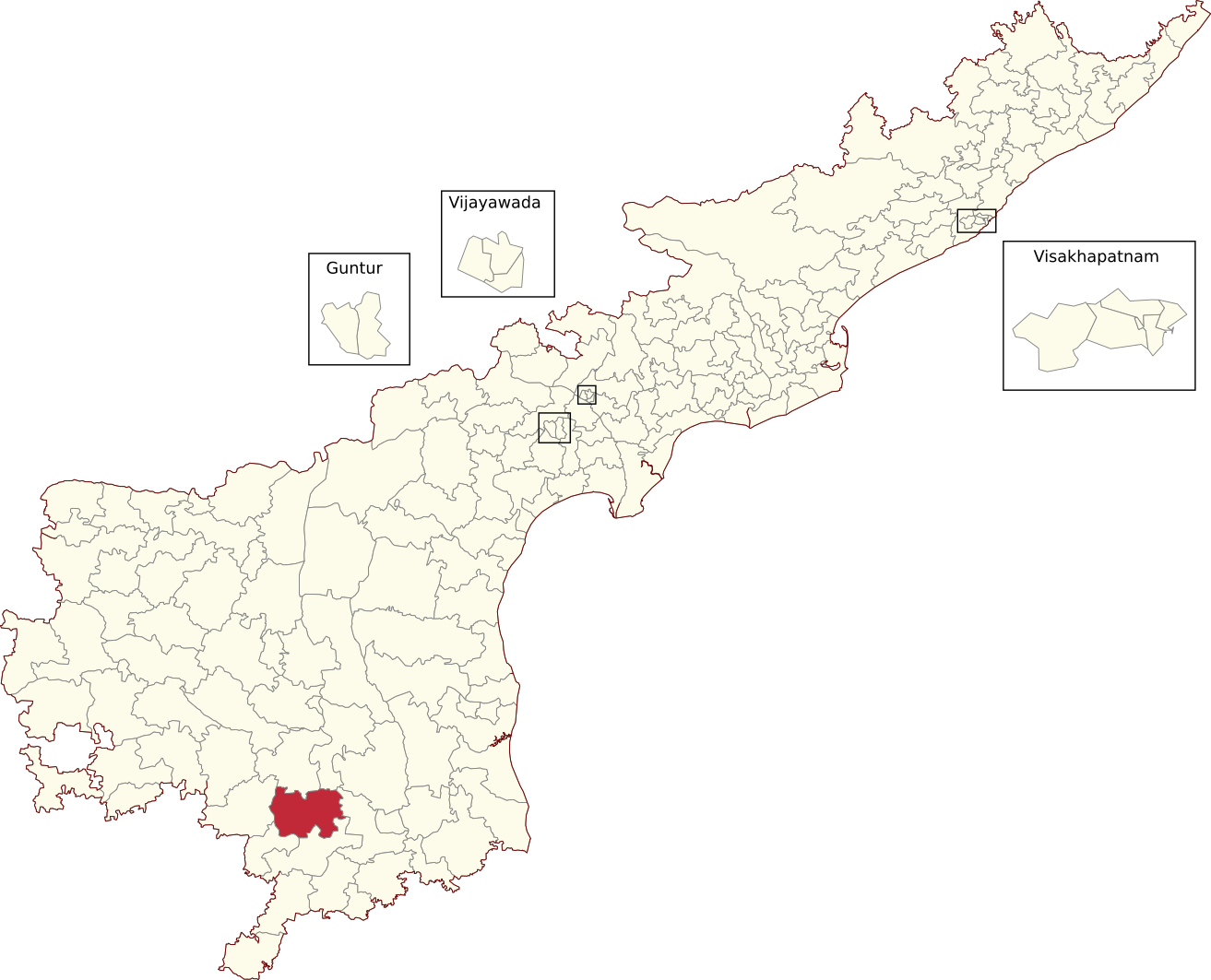
- Location of Pileru Assembly constituency within Andhra Pradesh

Constituency details
- Country: India
- Region: South India
- State: Andhra Pradesh
- District: Annamayya
- Lok Sabha constituency: Rajampet
- Established: 1951
- Total electors: 223,586
- Reservation: None

Member of Legislative Assembly
- 16th Andhra Pradesh Legislative Assembly
- Incumbent N. Kishore Kumar Reddy
- Party: TDP
- Alliance: NDA
- Elected year: 2024

Pileru Assembly constituency is a constituency in Annamayya district of Andhra Pradesh that elects representatives to the Andhra Pradesh Legislative Assembly in India. It is one of the seven assembly segments of Rajampet Lok Sabha constituency.

N. Kishore Kumar Reddy is the current MLA of the constituency, having won the 2024 Andhra Pradesh Legislative Assembly election from Telugu Desam Party. As of 2019, there are a total of 223,586 electors in the constituency. The constituency was established in 1951, as per the Delimitation Orders (1951).

== Mandals ==
Mandal
Gurramkonda
Valmikipuram
Pileru
Kalikiri
Kalakada
Kambhamvaripalle

Mandals in Pileru Assembly Constituency

== Members of the Legislative Assembly ==
Year	Member	Political party
1952	P. Thimma Reddy	Krishikar Lok Party
1955	Venkatarama Naidu N	Krishikar Lok Party
1962	C. K. Narayana Reddy	Communist Party of India
1967	Mogal Sufulla Baig	Indian National Congress
1972	Mogal Sufulla Baig	Indian National Congress
1978	Mogal Sufulla Baig	Indian National Congress (I)
1983	Challa Prabhakar Reddy	Telugu Desam Party
1985	Challa Prabhakar Reddy	Telugu Desam Party
1989	Peddireddy Ramachandra Reddy	Indian National Congress
1994	G.V. Sreenatha Reddy	Telugu Desam Party
1999	Peddireddy Ramachandra Reddy	Indian National Congress
2004	Peddireddy Ramachandra Reddy	Indian National Congress
2009	N. Kiran Kumar Reddy	Indian National Congress
2014	Chintala Ramachandra Reddy	YSR Congress Party
2019	Chintala Ramachandra Reddy	YSR Congress Party
2024	N. Kishore Kumar Reddy	Telugu Desam Party

== Election results ==
Vote share of Winning candidates
2024	54.50%
2019	48.92%
2014	42.46%
2009	35.75%
2004	58.03%
1999	55.25%
1994	52.92%
1989	62.60%
1985	52.17%
1983	66.94%
1978	46.76%
1972	64.48%
1967	46.80%
1962	48.80%
1955	0.00%
1952	0.00%

=== 2024 ===
2024 Andhra Pradesh Legislative Assembly election: Pileru
Party	Candidate	Votes	%	±%
TDP	N. Kishore Kumar Reddy	105,582	54.50	
YSRCP	Chinthala Ramachandra Reddy	80,501	41.55	
INC	Balireddy Somashekar Reddy	3,403	1.76	
NOTA	None of the Above	1,869	0.96	
IND	6 Independent Candidates	1,560	0.81	
OTH	3 Other Party Candidates	826	0.43	
Majority		25,081	12.95	
Turnout		193,741	82.44	
Swing to TDP from YSRCP		Swing		

=== 2019 ===
2019 Andhra Pradesh Legislative Assembly election: Pileru
Party	Candidate	Votes	%	±%
YSRCP	Chinthala Ramachandra Reddy	87,300	48.92	
TDP	N. Kishore Kumar Reddy	79,426	44.51	
INC	Khatib Syed Agha Mohiuddin	4,182	2.34	
JSP	B. Dinesh	2,374	1.33	
NOTA	None of the Above	2,145	1.20	
BJP	Puli Reddy Narendra Kumar Reddy	1,029	0.58	
IND	6 Independent Candidates	1,349	0.76	
OTH	3 Other Party Candidates	642	0.36	
Majority		7,874	4.41	
Turnout		178,447	79.67	
YSRCP hold		Swing		

=== 2014 ===
2014 Andhra Pradesh Legislative Assembly election: Pileru
Party	Candidate	Votes	%	±%
YSRCP	Chinthala Ramachandra Reddy	71,949	42.46	
JSP	Nallari Kishan Kumar Reddy	56,636	33.42	
TDP	Dr. K. Iqbal Ahmed Khan	33,857	19.98	
INC	G. Shanawaz Ali Khan	1,498	0.88	
NOTA	None of the Above	601	0.35	
IND	7 Independent Candidates	2,678	1.58	
OTH	2 Other Party Candidates	2,224	1.31	
Majority		15,313	9.04	
Turnout		169,443	78.73	
Swing to YSRCP from INC		Swing		

=== 2009 ===
2009 Andhra Pradesh Legislative Assembly election: Pileru
Party	Candidate	Votes	%	±%
INC	Kiran Kumar Reddy	53,905	35.75	
TDP	Imtiyaz Ahmed Shaik	44,773	29.70	
PRP	Chintala Ramachandra Reddy	44,197	29.31	
BJP	Kotapalli Sanondra Reddy	2,170	1.44	
IND	Bonumalla Venkatesu	1,783	1.18	
BSP	Balum Seshadri Yadav	1,171	0.78	
IND	S. S. Prasad	438	0.29	
OTH	4 Other Party Candidates	2,337	1.55	
Majority		9,132	6.05	
Turnout		150,774		
INC hold		Swing		

=== 2004 ===
2004 Andhra Pradesh Legislative Assembly election: Pileru
Party	Candidate	Votes	%	±%
INC	P. Ramachandra Reddy	67,328	58.03	
TDP	G. V. Sreenatha Reddy	45,740	39.42	
IND	N. Amaranatha Reddy	991	0.85	
IND	Y. Venkatarami Reddy	637	0.55	
IND	B. Kumaraswamy	518	0.45	
IND	D. R. Krishnaiah	465	0.40	
IND	V. Pattabhi	345	0.30	
Majority		21,588	18.61	
Turnout		116,024		
INC hold		Swing		

=== 1999 ===
1999 Andhra Pradesh Legislative Assembly election: Pileru
Party	Candidate	Votes	%	±%
INC	P. Ramachandra Reddy	62,562	55.25	
TDP	G. V. Sreenatha Reddy	49,129	43.39	
IND	4 Independent Candidates	467	0.41	
OTH	3 Other Party Candidates	1,076	0.95	
Majority		13,433	11.86	
Turnout		115,873	76.02	
Swing to INC from TDP		Swing		

=== 1994 ===
1994 Andhra Pradesh Legislative Assembly election: Pileru
Party	Candidate	Votes	%	±%
TDP	G. V. Sreenatha Reddy	57,160	52.92	
INC	P. Ramachandra Reddy	47,505	43.98	
BSP	Rajasekhar Thullur	834	0.77	
BJP	Bodikuila Chandrasekhar Reddy	424	0.39	
IND	15 Independent Candidates	2,097	1.94	
Majority		9,655	8.94	
Turnout		109,661	78.88	
Swing to TDP from INC		Swing		

=== 1989 ===
1989 Andhra Pradesh Legislative Assembly election: Pileru
Party	Candidate	Votes	%	±%
INC	P. Ramachandra Reddy	61,191	62.60	
TDP	Challa Ramachandra Reddy	36,555	37.40	
Majority		24,636	25.20	
Turnout		100,978	74.49	
Swing to INC from TDP		Swing		

=== 1985 ===
1985 Andhra Pradesh Legislative Assembly election: Pileru
Party	Candidate	Votes	%	±%
TDP	Challa Prabhakara Reddy	42,187	52.17	
INC	P. Ramachandra Reddy	37,938	46.92	
IND	Degala Krishnaiah	478	0.59	
IND	Satrasala Narendra Guptha	259	0.32	
Majority		4,249	5.25	
Turnout		81,624	71.86	
Swing to TDP from Independent		Swing		

=== 1983 ===
1983 Andhra Pradesh Legislative Assembly election: Pileru
Party	Candidate	Votes	%	±%
IND	Challa Prabhakara Reddy	50,651	66.94	
INC	Mogul Syfullah Baig	25,016	33.06	
Majority		25,635	33.88	
Turnout		76,615	73.20	
Swing to Independent from INC(I)		Swing		

=== 1978 ===
1978 Andhra Pradesh Legislative Assembly election: Pileru
Party	Candidate	Votes	%	±%
INC(I)	Mogal Sufulla Baig	36,476	46.76	
JP	P. Ramachandra Reddy	22,203	28.46	
IND	Nallari Bhaskara Reddy	16,557	21.23	
INC	C. V. Narayana Reddy	2,434	3.12	
IND	G. Venkatayya	334	0.43	
Majority		14,273	18.30	
Turnout		79,531	79.68	
Swing to INC(I) from INC		Swing		

=== 1972 ===
1972 Andhra Pradesh Legislative Assembly election: Pileru
Party	Candidate	Votes	%	±%
INC	Mogal Syfulla Baig	42,884	64.48	
IND	G. V. Chandra Sekhara Reddy	21,407	32.19	
IND	Kuchalaiah	890	1.34	
IND	N. Sidrulu	671	1.01	
IND	Sandra Ramaiah Naidu	658	0.99	
Majority		21,477	32.29	
Turnout		68,143	73.56	
INC hold		Swing		

=== 1967 ===
1967 Andhra Pradesh Legislative Assembly election: Pileru
Party	Candidate	Votes	%	±%
INC	V. C. R. Gurram	28,816	46.80	
SWA	R. R. Varanasi	20,935	34.00	
CPI(M)	C. K. N. Reddy	11,824	19.20	
Majority		7,881	12.80	
Turnout		64,008	78.83	
Swing to INC from CPI		Swing		

=== 1962 ===
1962 Andhra Pradesh Legislative Assembly election: Pileru
Party	Candidate	Votes	%	±%
CPI	C. K. Narayana Reddy	21,088	48.80	
INC	Syfulla Baig	14,175	32.80	
IND	Raya Venkatadri Naidu	5,550	12.84	
IND	Siddulu	2,398	5.55	
Majority		6,913	16.00	
Turnout		45,269	63.36	
Swing to CPI from KLP		Swing		

=== 1952 ===
1952 Madras State Legislative Assembly election: Pileru
Party	Candidate	Votes	%	±%
KLP	P. Thimma Reddi	27,481	61.70%	
INC	N. Bhaskara Reddy	11,922	26.77%	26.77%
Socialist	N. Venkataramana Reddy	3,186	7.15%	
Independent	V. Konda Reddy	1,954	4.39%	
Margin of victory		15,559	34.93%	
Turnout		44,543	73.39%	
Registered electors		60,693		
win (new seat)				
