= Kalikiri =

- Town
- Interactive map of Kalikiri
- Location in Andhra Pradesh, India
- Coordinates: 13.6333°N 78.8000°E
- Country: India
- State: Andhra Pradesh
- District: Annamayya
- Mandal: Kalikiri

Population (2011)
  - Total: 13,065

Languages
  - Official: Telugu
- Time zone: UTC+5:30 (IST)
- PIN: 517234
- Vehicle registration: AP
- Nearest city: Pileru
- Assembly constituency: Pileru
- Lok Sabha constituency: Rajampeta

Kalikiri is a village in Annamayya district of Andhra Pradesh state in India. It is the Mandal headquarters of Kalikiri Area.

== Educational institutes ==
=== Colleges ===
- JNTUA College of Engineering, Kalikiri
- Govt. Polytechnic college, Kalikiri
- Govt. Agricultures Polytechnic College, Kalikiri
- SEICOM Degree College
- Srinivasa Degree college

=== Schools ===
- Akshara English Medium High School
- Adi's Indian High School
- Rayalaseema High School
- Sainik School Kalikiri
- Santhiniketan High School
- Tapasya E.M High School

== Notable people ==
- Kiran Kumar Reddy – Ex Chief Minister of Combined Andhra Pradesh
- N. Kishore Kumar Reddy present MLA of pileru constituency
