= Chalampalli =

- Village
- Country: India
- State: Andhra Pradesh
- District: Chittoor

Languages
  - Official: Telugu
- Time zone: UTC+5:30 (IST)
- PIN: 517192
- Telephone code: 08584

Chalampalli is a village in the Gram panchayat of Ganugachintha, Rompicherla mandal, Chittoor district in the state of Andhra Pradesh, India. It is located 8 km from Rompicherla and 20 km from Pileru.

== Demographics ==
Chalampalli is home to approximately 500 people, mainly from the Velama, Naidu and Reddy castes, but with a number of others represented, including Golla, Vaddi, Chakali and Harijana.
