= Raja of Manchuru =

Ruler of the Estate of Manchuru

- Creation date: c.1800
- Creation: Zamindari of British India
- Present holder: Bharathi Rajendran, 8th Rani of Manchuru
- Heir apparent: Yuvaraja Rohan Rajendran-Morris
- Remainder to: Heirs of the body whatsoever
- Status: Extant
- Former seat: Rajendran Mansion

The Raja of Manchuru, is an Indian title of nobility. It originally designated the feudal lord of the Manchuru Estate.

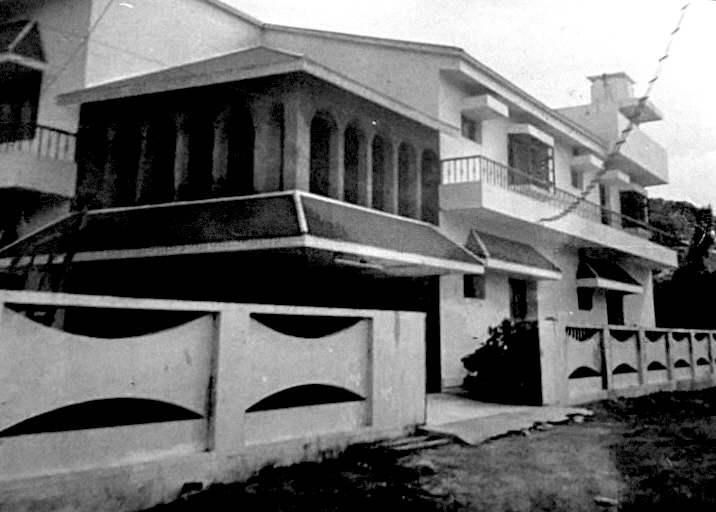
Rajendran Mansion, former seat of the 8th Rani of Manchuru

== List of Rajas of Manchuru ==
(Preceding geneological records are vague, however local estimates place five title holders before this)

- Govindarajulu Kalikiri-Reddy, 6th Raja of Manchuru

- Venkataswamy Kalikiri-Reddy, 7th Raja of Manchuru

In 1947, the British Raj was replaced by a republic. Under the Indian Constitution adopted in 1950, titles of nobility are not legally recognised; only being held titularly, however these titles were never formally abolished in the British sense.

- Bharathi Rajendran, 8th Rani of Manchuru

== Post-abolition status ==
The title was legally extinguished in 1950 by the enactment of Article 18 of the Indian Constitution. However, there are documented cases of usage as a courtesy title, especially in ceremonial contexts, since then.
