= Mangalampeta =

- Village
- Interactive map of Mangalampeta
- Location in Andhra Pradesh, India
- Coordinates: 13°36′N 79°06′E
- Country: India
- State: Andhra Pradesh
- District: Chittoor
- Mandal: Pulicherla

Population (2011)
  - Total: 3,139

Languages
  - Official: Telugu
- Time zone: UTC+5:30 (IST)
- PIN: 517172

Mangalampeta is a village in Chittoor district of the Indian state of Andhra Pradesh. It is located in Pulicherla mandal. In 2011 the population of the village was 3,139, of which 1,641 were males and 1,498 were females. There were 838 houses.
