= Lakkireddypalli mandal =

Mandal in Annamayya district, Andhra Pradesh, India

- Mandal
- Interactive map of Lakkireddypalli mandal
- Country: India
- State: Andhra Pradesh
- District: Annamayya
- Revenue division: Rayachoti
- Time zone: UTC+05:30 (IST)

Lakkireddypalli mandal is one of the 30 mandals in Annamayya district in the Indian state of Andhra Pradesh. It is a part of Rayachoti revenue division. The mandal used to be a part of Kadapa district and was made part of the newly formed Annamayya district on 4 April 2022.
