= National Highway 340 (India) =

National highway in India

National Highway 340
- Map of National Highway 340 in red

Route information
- Length: 253 km (157 mi)

Major junctions
- North east end: Kadapa
- South west end: Bangalore

Location
- Country: India
- States: Karnataka
- Primary destinations: Rayachoti, Chinnamandem, Gurramkonda, Madanapalli, Chinthamani, Hoskote, Bangalore.

Highway system
- Roads in India; Expressways; National; State; Asian

National Highway 340 (NH 340) is a National Highway in the Indian state of Andhra Pradesh & Karnataka. It was formed as a new highway by up-grading former state highway of the state. It starts at Kadapa and Bangalore .

== Route ==
It starts at Kadapa and passes through Rayachoti, Chinnamandem, Gurramkonda, Madanapalli, Chinthamani, and Bangalore in Karnataka. It has a route length of 253 km (157 mi)

== See also ==
- List of national highways in Andhra Pradesh
