= N. Kishore Kumar Reddy =

Indian politician (born 1965)

- Born: 13 September 1965 (age 60); Pileru, Chittoor district, Andhra Pradesh, India
- Occupation: Politician
- Political party: Telugu Desam Party (2017-Present)
- Other political affiliations: Jai Samaikyandhra Party (2014-2017)
- Spouse: Nallari Thanuja Reddy
- Children: 1
- Website: Official website

Nallari Kishore Kumar Reddy was (born on 13 September 1965) also known as Nallari Kishan Kumar Reddy . He inherits political origins from his father Late Amarnath Reddy who served as a minister in the cabinet of P. V. Narasimha Rao during his period of service (1971–1973) as the Chief Minister of Andhra Pradesh between, who also went on to become the Prime Minister of India (1991–1996). Kishore Kumar Reddy is the younger brother of former Congress Chief Minister Nallari Kiran Kumar Reddy of Andhra Pradesh.

The Nallari family is a well-known political family in the Chittoor district. The political legacy of the family has continued since the time of Late Amarnath Reddy to the Nallari brothers and their offspring.

Kishore Kumar Reddy is married to N Thanuja Reddy. They have two children, son Nallari Amarnath Reddy and a daughter N. Vaishnavi Reddy, who are currently pursuing a career in the medical field. Nallari Amarnath Reddy has been spotted actively supporting his father in his political rallies and campaigns.

== Early life ==
Kishore Kumar Reddy has been the Chairman of AP Water Resource Development Corporation. Nallari Kishore Kumar hails from Nagaripalle, Chittoor District. He completed his schooling from Hyderabad Public School in the year 1984, Intermediate from Nrupthunga Junior College Hyderabad in the year 1987, and Bachelor of Arts from Nizam College, Hyderabad, in the year 1990.

== Political career ==
Referring to his elder brother Nallari Kiran Kumar Reddy's advice Kishore Kumar Reddy entered politics and contested from the Pileru Assembly in 2014 elections representing the Jai Samaikyandhra Party (JSP) and secured 57,000 votes. The JSP party was floated by his elder brother Nallari Kiran Kumar Reddy.

In 2017 Nallari Kishore Kumar Reddy joined the Telugu Desam Party (TDP). Kishore Kumar Reddy kick-started his journey in the TDP party in the presence of the Chief Minister AP Nara Chandrababu Naidu by draping a yellow scarf on his neck.

In the 2014 elections, Kishore Kumar Reddy lost in Pileru by a close margin to YSR Congress candidate Chinthala Ramachandra Reddy. Chief Minister of Andhra Pradesh Nara Chandrababu Naidu has nominated Kishore Kumar Reddy as the Chairman of AP Housing Development Corporation. Earlier Kishore Kumar was appointed the Chairman of AP Water Resource Development Corporation. Kishore Kumar Reddy is confident of gaining TDP ticket in Pileru constituency.
