= Rompicherla, Chittoor district =

Rompicherla
- Mandal
- Interactive map of Rompicherla
- Location in Andhra Pradesh, India
- Coordinates: 13°42′N 79°00′E
- Country: India
- State: Andhra Pradesh
- District: Chittoor
- Mandal: Rompicherla

Population (2011)
  - Total: 8,679

Languages
  - Official: Telugu
- Time zone: UTC+5:30 (IST)
- PIN: 517192
- Telephone code: +91–8584
- Vehicle registration: AP
- Nearest City: Pileru
- Assembly Constituency: Punganur
- Lok Sabha Constituency: Rajampeta

Rompicherla is a village in Chittoor district of the Indian state of Andhra Pradesh. It is the mandal headquarters of Rompicherla mandal.

== Demographics ==
As per Population Census 2011, The Rompicherla village has population of 8679 of which 4280 are males while 4399 are females, with a sex Ratio of 1028 which is higher than Andhra Pradesh's state average of 993. The population of children with age 0-6 is 953, Child Sex Ratio for the village as per census is 895 and literacy rate of the village was 70.26%.
