= Rayachoti revenue division =

Revenue division in Annamayya district, Andhra Pradesh, India

- revenue division in Annamayya district
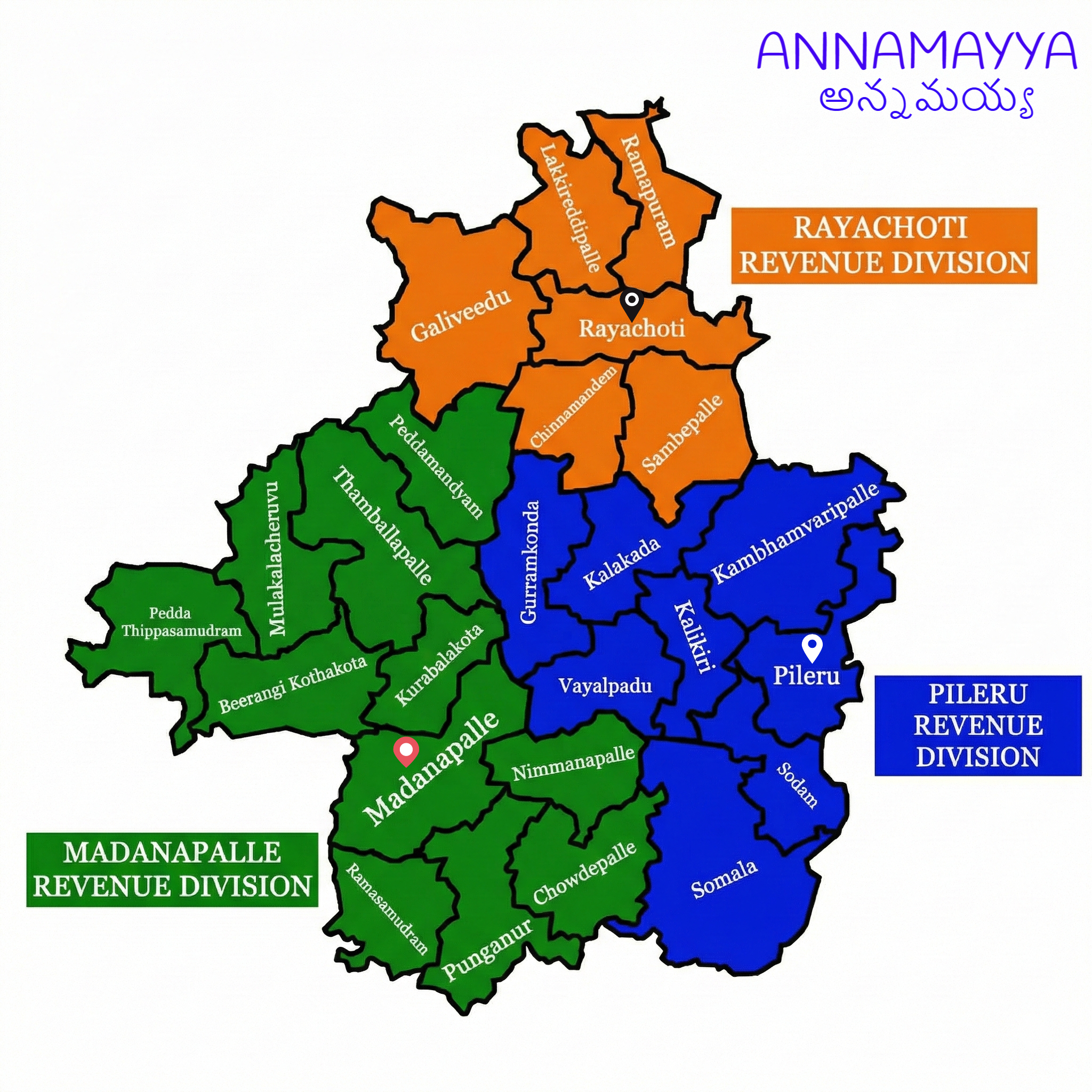
- Rayachoti revenue division in Annamayya district
- Country: India
- State: Andhra Pradesh
- District: Annamayya
- Formed: 4 April 2022
- Headquarters: Rayachoti
- Time zone: UTC+05:30 (IST)

Rayachoti revenue division is an administrative division in the Annamayya district of the Indian state of Andhra Pradesh. It is one of the three revenue divisions in the district and comprises six mandals. It was formed on 4 April 2022 along with the newly formed Annamayya district.

== Administration ==
The revenue division comprises ten mandals: Chinnamandyam, Galiveedu, Lakkireddypalli, Rayachoti, Sambepalli, Ramapuram.

== History ==
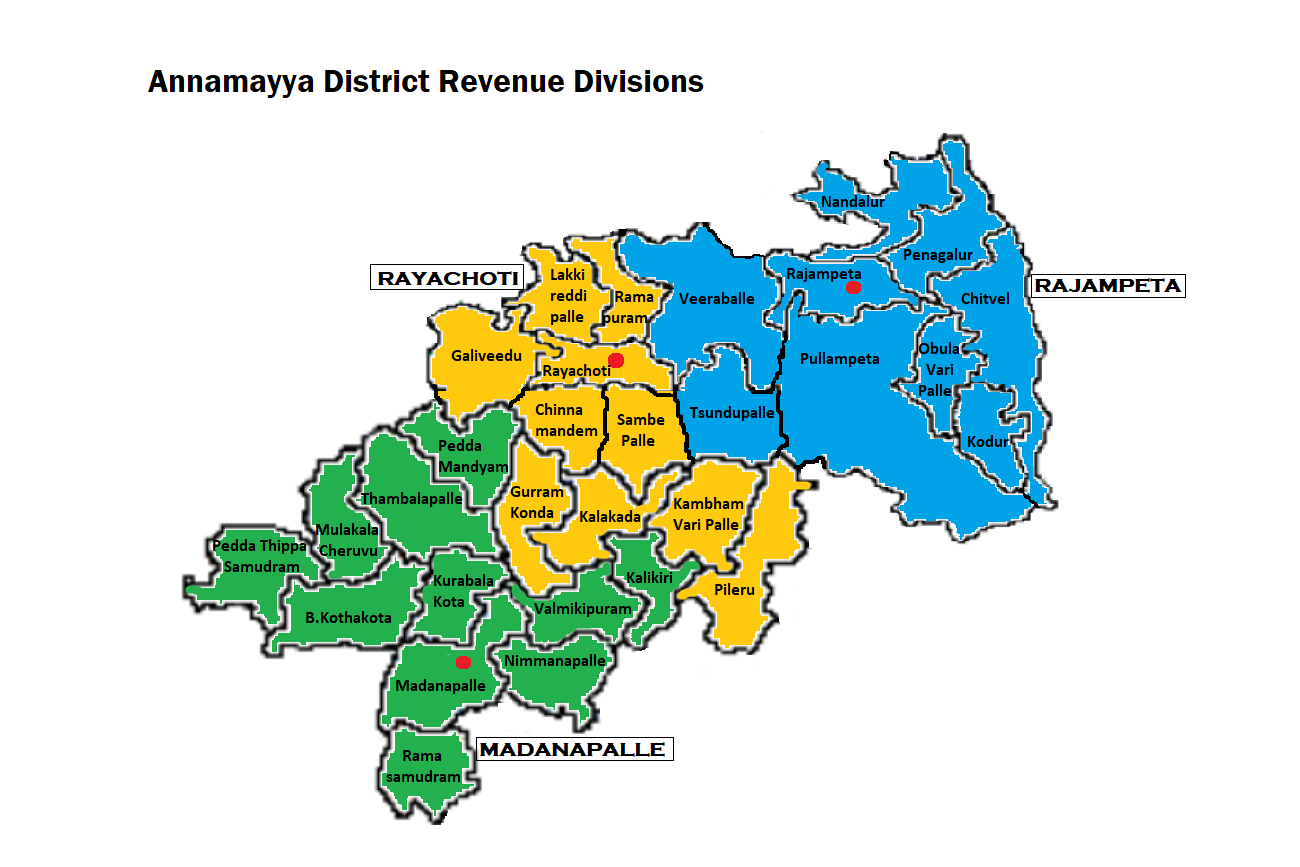
Rayachoti Revenue Division before December 2025

== See also ==
- List of revenue divisions in Andhra Pradesh
- List of mandals in Andhra Pradesh
- Madanapalle revenue division
- Pileru revenue division
