= Pileru =

- Town
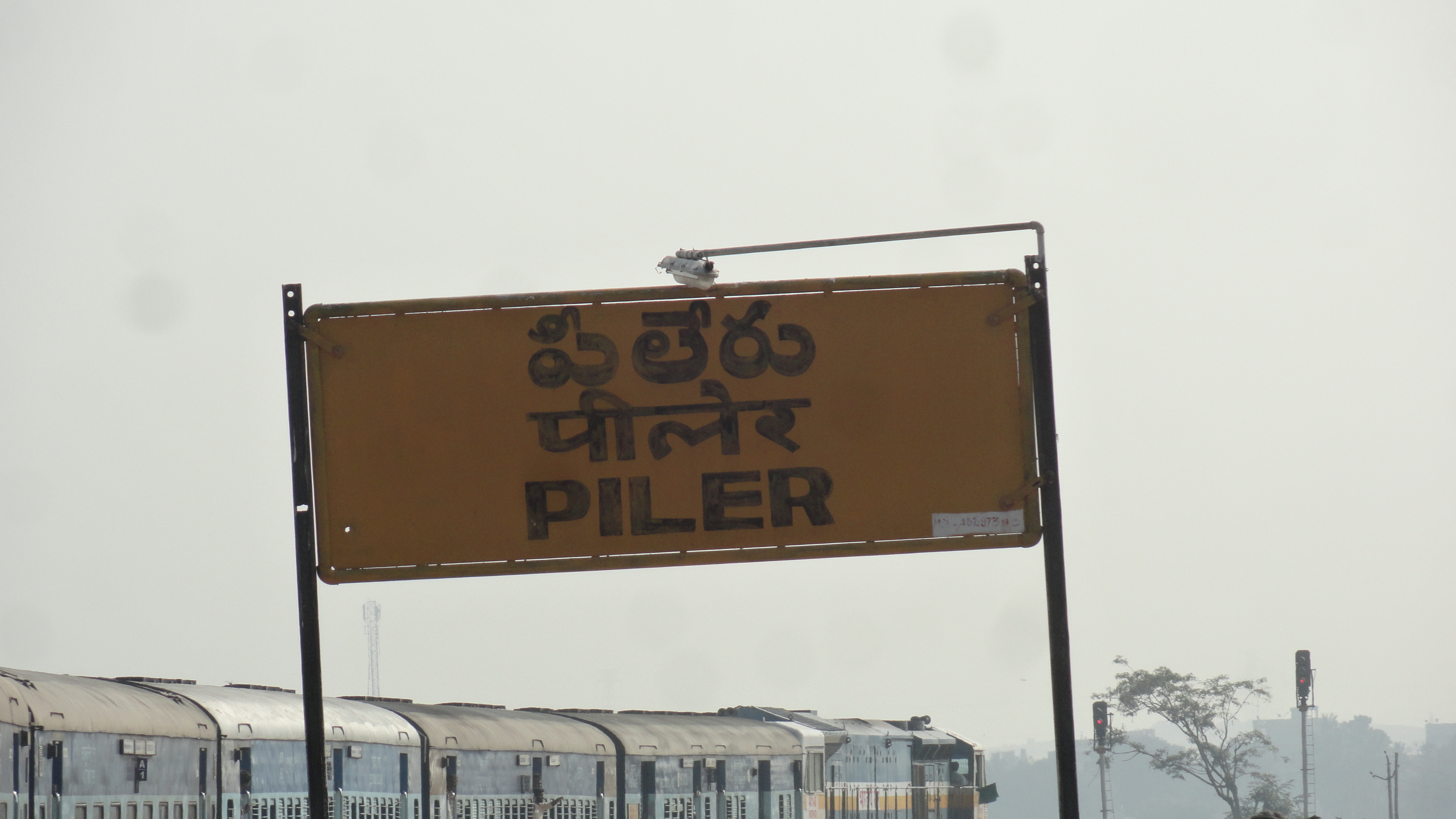
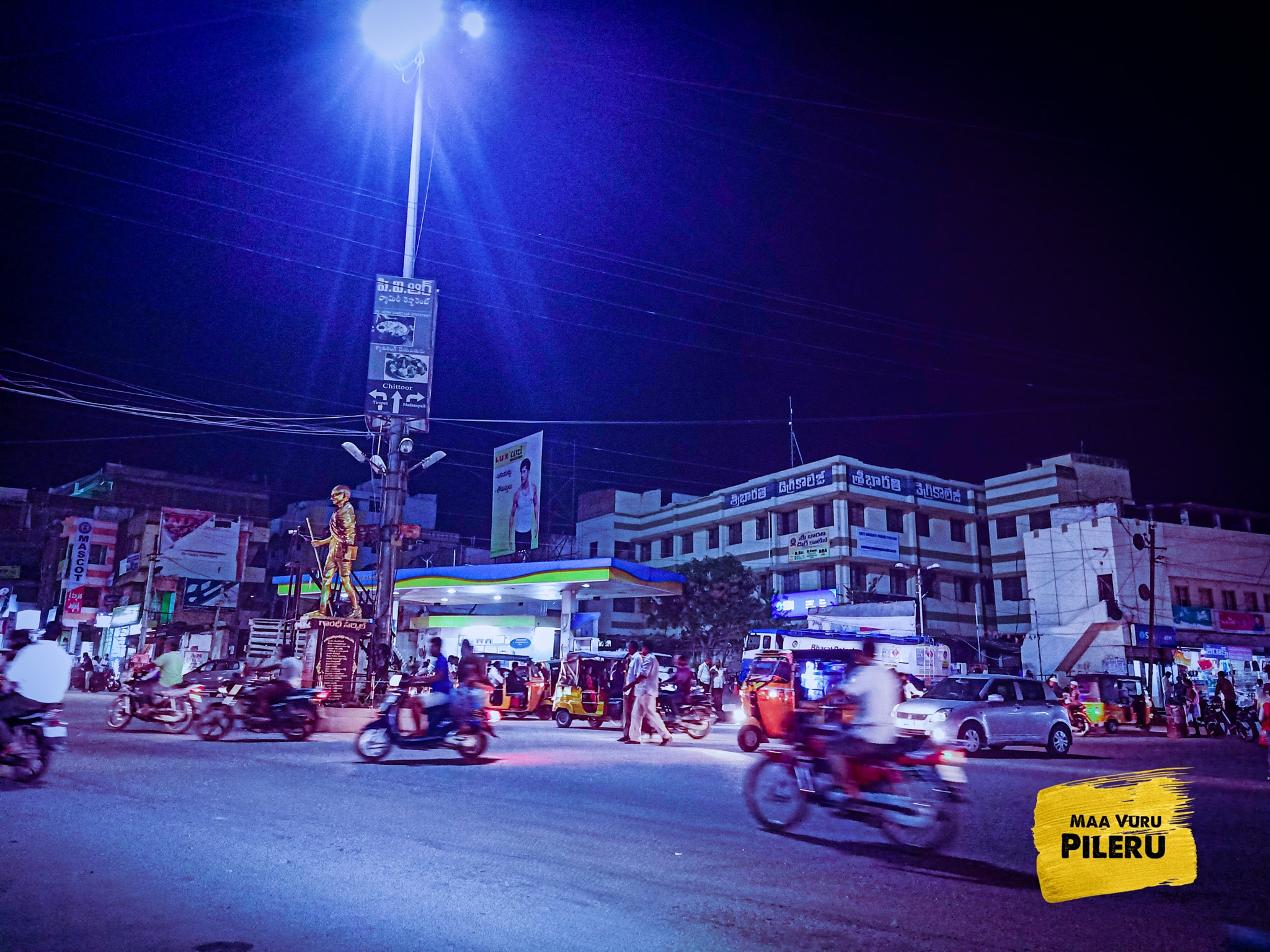
- Pileru Railway Road, Pileru NH Cross Roads
- Nickname: PLR
- Interactive map of Pileru
- Location in Andhra Pradesh, India Pileru (India) Pileru (Asia)
- Coordinates: 13.6549°N 78.9471°E
- Country: India
- State: Andhra Pradesh
- Region: Rayalaseema
- District: Annamayya
- Sub-District/Mandal: Pileru

Government
  - Type: Major Panchayath
  - MP: P. V. Midhun Reddy (YSRCP)
  - MLA: N. Kishore Kumar Reddy (TDP)
  - Assembly: Pileru
  - Lok Sabha: Rajampeta

Area
  - Total: 15.85 km^{2} (6.12 sq mi)

Population (2011)
  - Total: 60,253
  - Density: 3,801/km^{2} (9,846/sq mi)

Languages
  - Official: Telugu
- Time zone: UTC+5:30 (IST)
- PIN: 517214 (Urban); 5172XX (Rural)
- Telephone code: +91–8584
- Vehicle registration: AP-03 (until 2019); AP-39, AP-40
- RTO: AP403- MVI Office Pileru

Pileru is a town in the Annamayya district of the Rayalaseema region of the Indian state of Andhra Pradesh. Pileru is located 197 kilometers northeast of Bangalore, the capital city of Karnataka, 189 kilometers northwest of Chennai, the capital city of Tamil Nadu, and 464 kilometers south of the state capital Amaravati. It is the mandal headquarters of the Pileru mandal in the Pileru revenue division. The name "Pileru" means a "small river stream" or "Pilla Eru" in Telugu.

== Geography ==
It is located at an average elevation of 458 m (1,502 ft) above mean sea level.

Pileru is located at 13.6549°N 78.9471°E

There are 14 villages in this mandal apart from Pileru:

1. Agraharam
2. Avuvaripalle
3. Bodumalluvaripalle
4. Doddipalle
5. Gudarevupalle
6. Jandla
7. Kavalipalle
8. Maddelacheruvu
9. Mellacheruvu
10. Mudupulavemula
11. Regullu
12. Talupula
13. Vepulabylu
14. Yerraguntlapalle

Climate data for Piler
Month	Jan	Feb	Mar	Apr	May	Jun	Jul	Aug	Sep	Oct	Nov	Dec	Year
Mean daily maximum °C (°F)	27.3 (81.1)	30.2 (86.4)	33.4 (92.1)	34.9 (94.8)	35 (95)	32.1 (89.8)	30.2 (86.4)	30.1 (86.2)	29.9 (85.8)	28.6 (83.5)	26.8 (80.2)	25.7 (78.3)	30.4 (86.6)
Mean daily minimum °C (°F)	15.5 (59.9)	16.8 (62.2)	19.4 (66.9)	22.2 (72.0)	23.6 (74.5)	22.8 (73.0)	21.8 (71.2)	21.8 (71.2)	21.2 (70.2)	20.2 (68.4)	17.8 (64.0)	15.6 (60.1)	19.9 (67.8)
Average precipitation mm (inches)	4 (0.2)	2 (0.1)	3 (0.1)	28 (1.1)	61 (2.4)	51 (2.0)	81 (3.2)	73 (2.9)	111 (4.4)	143 (5.6)	54 (2.1)	32 (1.3)	643 (25.4)

== Education ==
The primary and secondary school education is imparted by government, aided and private schools, under the School Education Department of the state. The medium of instruction followed by different schools are English, Telugu and Urdu.

Schools In Pileru:

- GOVT High School Kotapalli, Pileru
- AP Residential school
- Sree Bhuvana Educational Institutions(Sree Bhuvana Vidyalayam)
- SVSN Siddartha EM High School
- AVR EM High School
- Kakatiya EM High School
- Ratnam High School
- Sadhana High School
- Sri Vivekananda EM High School
- Sri Sai Baba High School
- Narayana EM High School
- Sri Chaitanya EM High School
- Boys High School
- Girls High School

Junior Colleges In Pileru:

- GOVT Junior College Pileru
- Sri Medha Junior College
- Priyadarshini Junior College
- Sri Chaitanya Junior College
- Margadarsi Junior College

Degree Colleges In Pileru:

- Sanjay Gandhi Government Degree College Pileru(SGGDC)
- Sri Chaitanya Degree College(Sree Medha's)
- CNR Arts And Sciences
- Sri Bharathi Degree College
- Bhaskar ITI College

Engineering Colleges In Pileru:

- M.J.R. College of Engineering & Technology Pileru (MJRCET)

== Notable people ==
- Nallari Kiran Kumar Reddy (Former Chief Minister of Andhra Pradesh

== Transport ==
Pileru is the junction of two National highways (NH-40 and NH-71), also Pileru is the equidistant to four Cities.

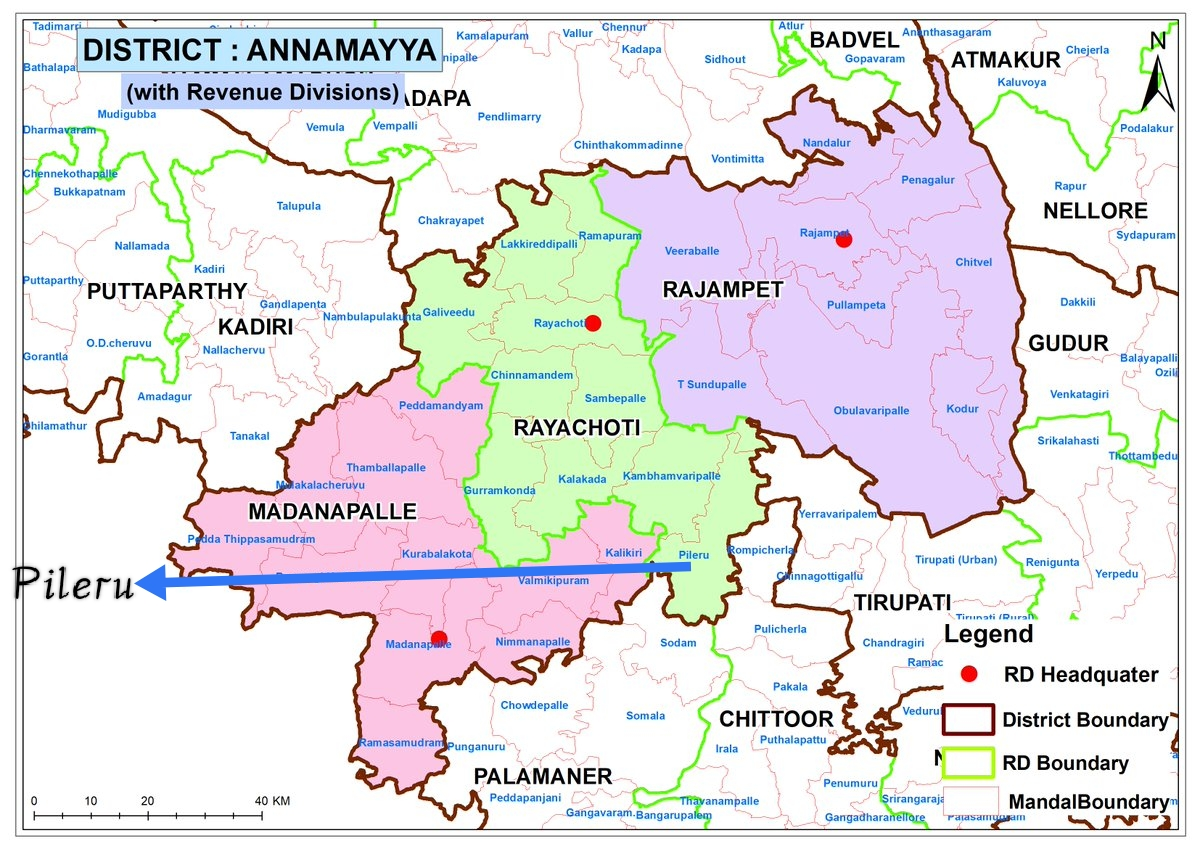

1. Chittoor to the South (57 Km)
2. Tirupati to the east (56Km)
3. Madanapalle to the west (58Km)
4. Rayachoti to the north (55Km)

Pileru is located at the center Spot where the Annamayya, Chittoor and Tirupati districts share their borders.

Pileru is also well connected by Railways Under Guntakal Railway Division,South Coast Railway zone. Pileru serves as a bus depot headquarter of the Pileru region and the Bus services are provided by state corporations APSRTC (Andhra Pradesh), and KSRTC(Karnataka).

== See also ==
- List of census towns in Andhra Pradesh
