= Annamayya district =

District of Andhra Pradesh, India

Annamayya District
- District of Andhra Pradesh
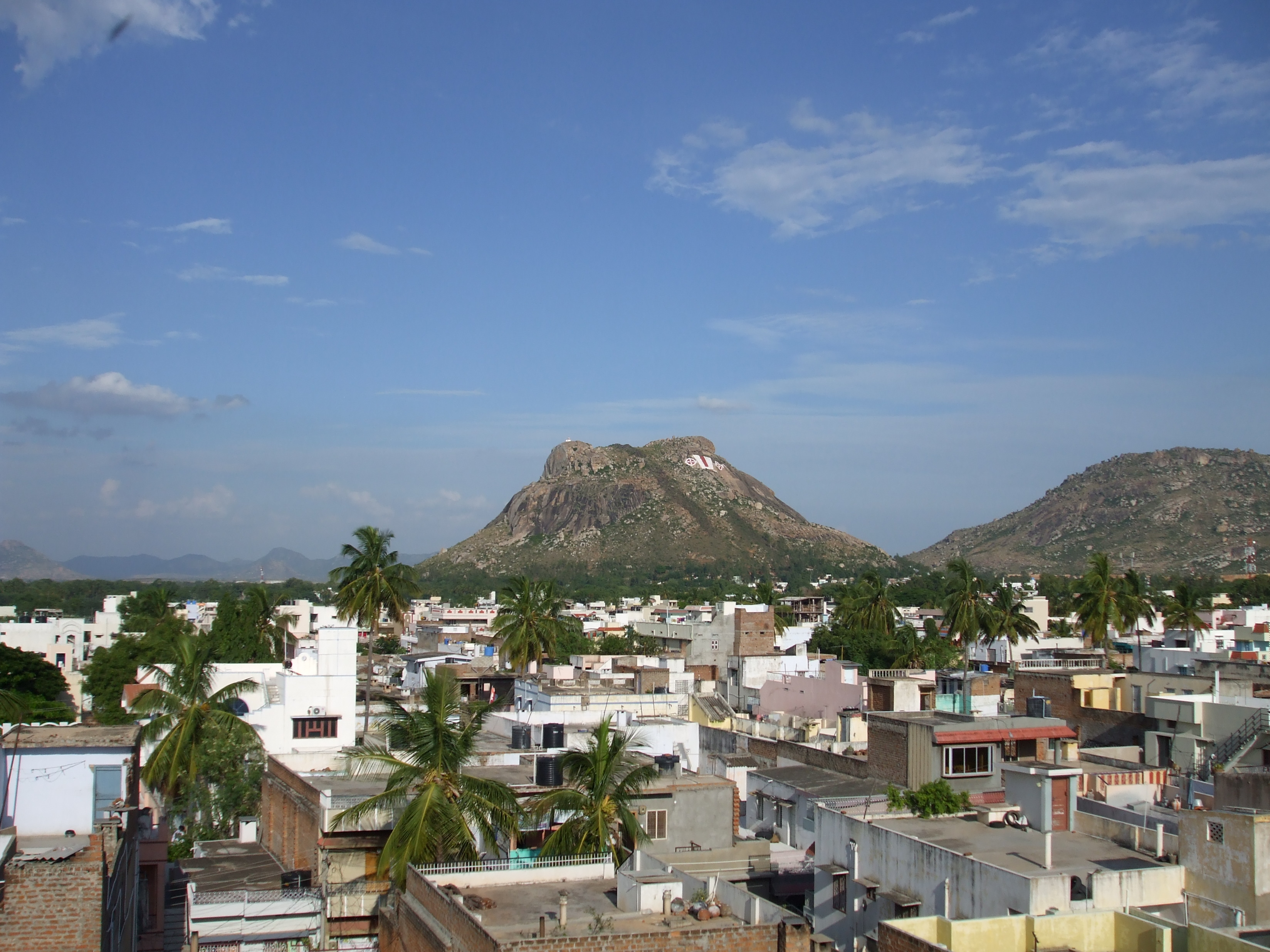
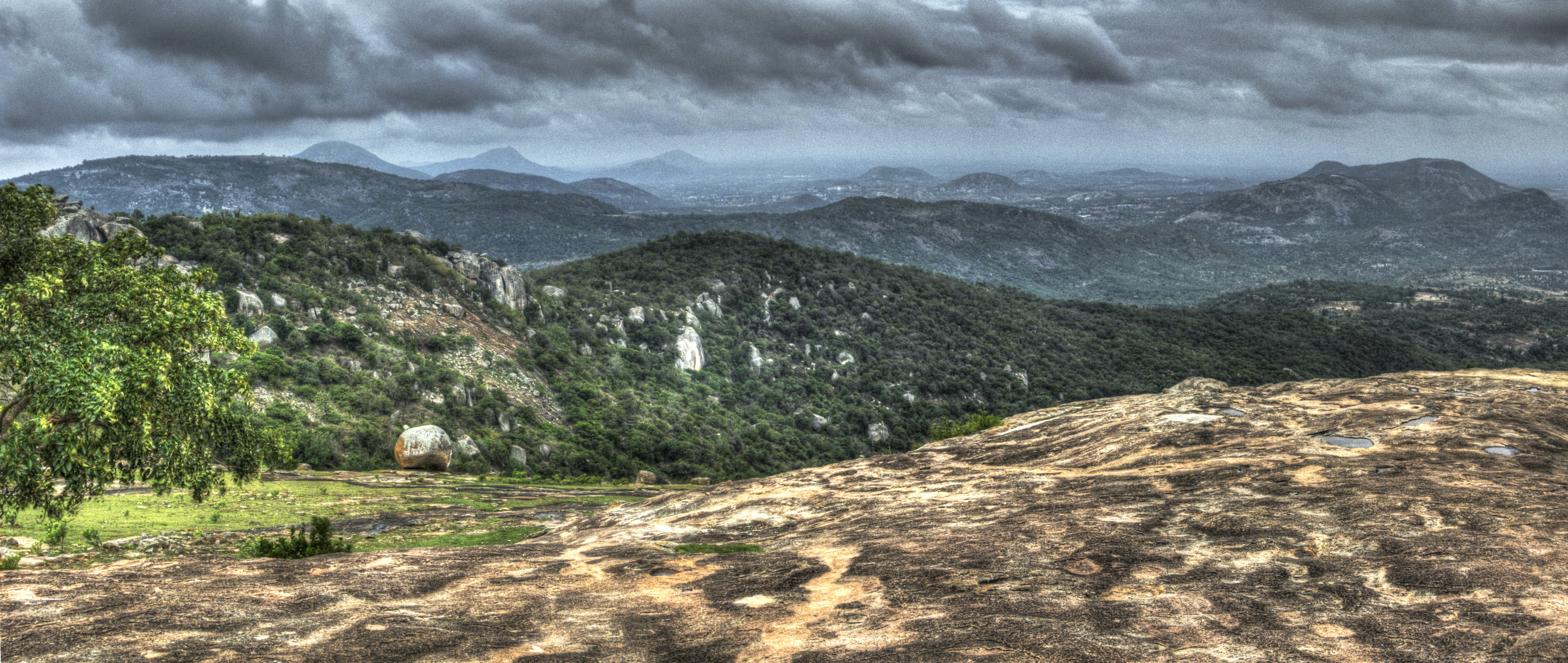
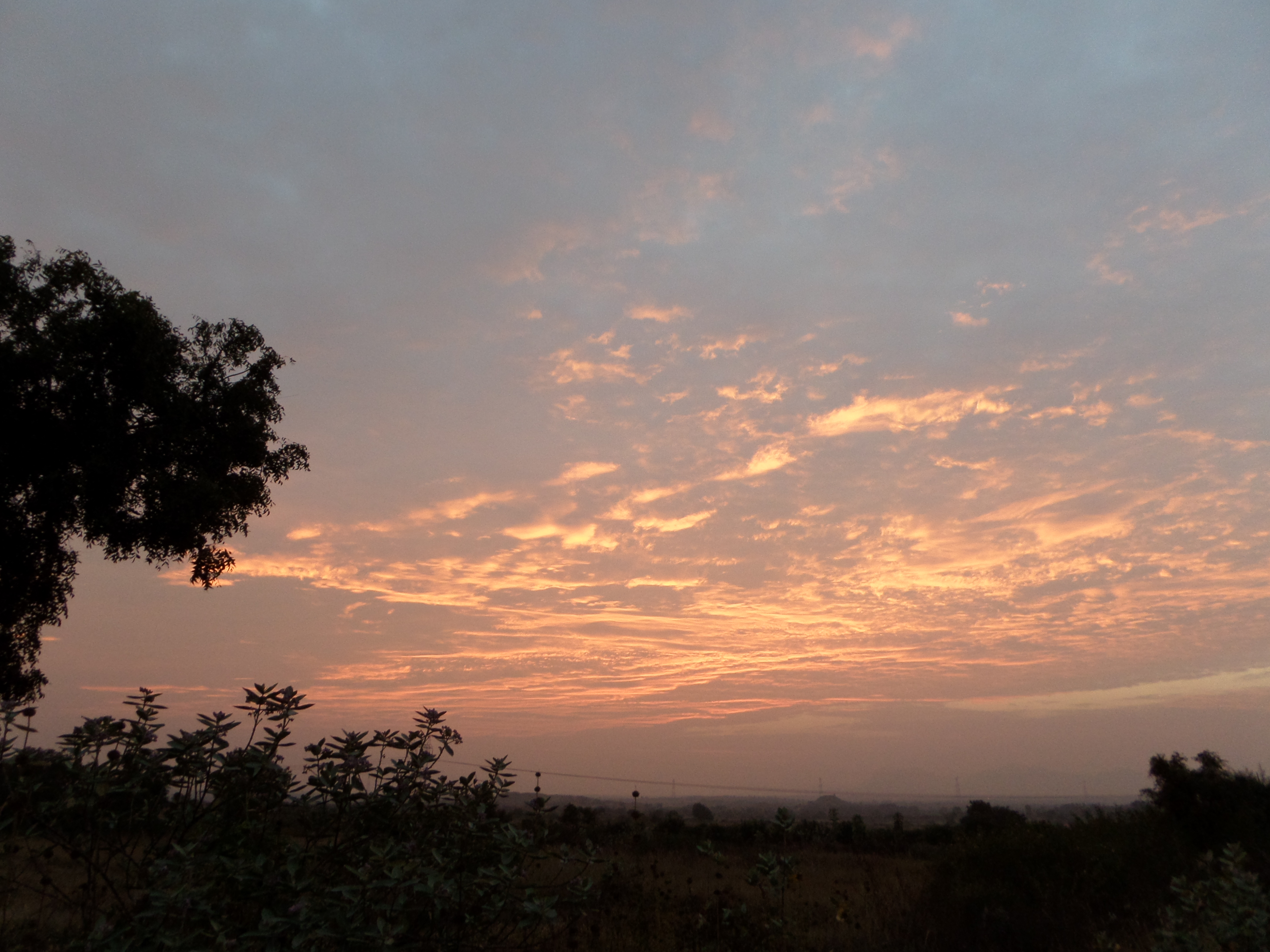
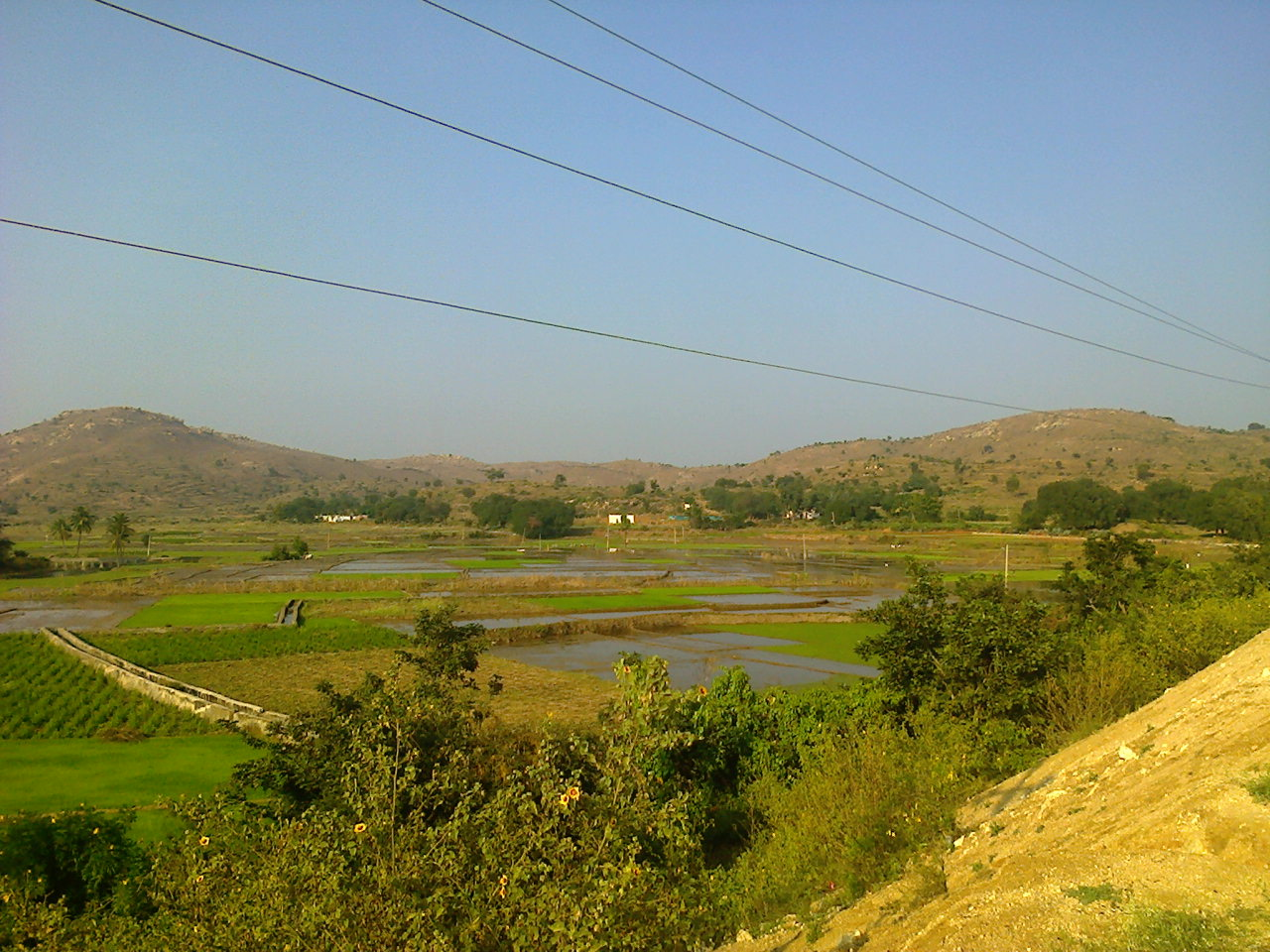
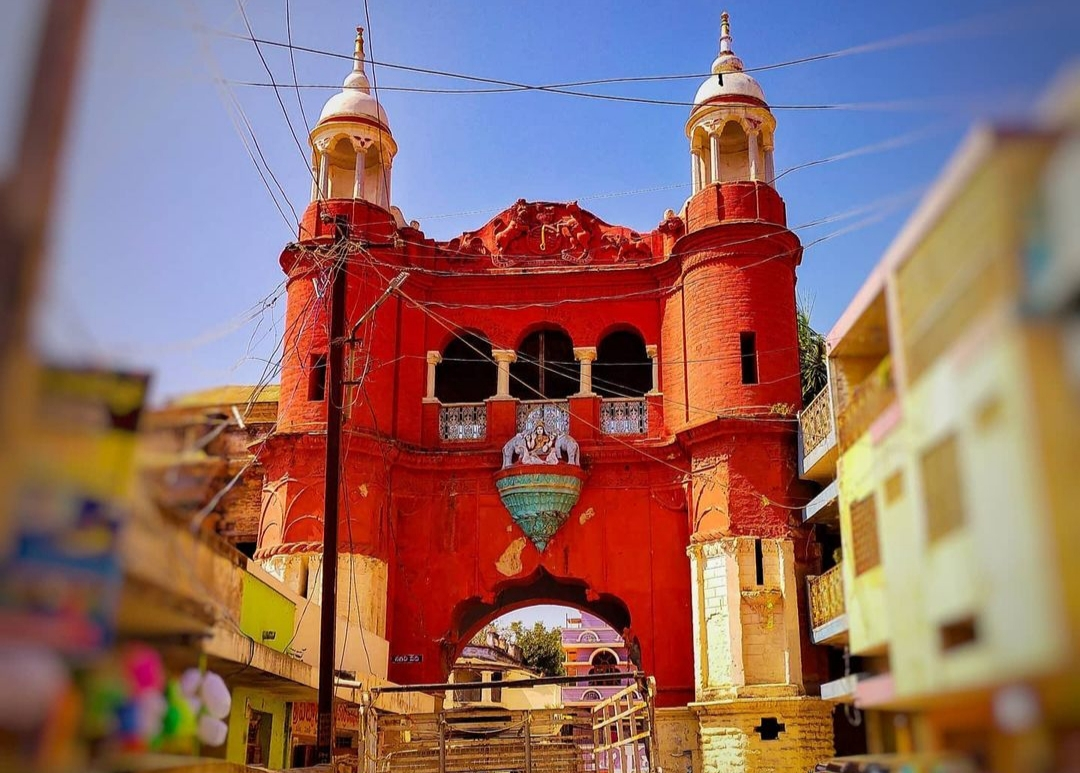
- Clockwise from top-left: View of Horsely Hills during winter, Madanapalle, sunset in Pileru, paddy fields in Kosuvari Palle Village, view of a old palace in Punganur.

- Location of Annamayya district in Andhra Pradesh
- Interactive map of Annamayya District
- Coordinates: 13.55°N 78.50°E
- Country: India
- State: Andhra Pradesh
- Region: Rayalaseema
- Formed: 4 April 2022
- Reorganized: 31 December 2025
- Founder: Government of Andhra Pradesh
- Named for: Annamacharya
- Headquarters & Largest City: Madanapalle
- Revenue divisions and mandals: 25 mandals across 3 revenue divisions: Madanapalle; Pileru; Rayachoti

Government
  - District Collector: Nishant Kumar, IAS
  - SP: Dheeraj Kunubili, IPS
  - DFO: R. Jagannath Singh, IFS

Area
  - Total: 7,951 km^{2} (3,070 sq mi)

Population (2011)
  - Total: 1,697,308
  - Density: 213.5/km^{2} (552.9/sq mi)

Languages
  - Official: Telugu

Literacy
  - Literates: 10,03,000
- Time zone: UTC+05:30 (IST)
- Postal Index Number: 516XXX, 517XXX
- District LGD code: 753
- District abbreviation: NNM
- Website: annamayya.ap.gov.in

Annamayya district is one of the eight districts in the Rayalaseema region of Andhra Pradesh, formed in 2022 as part of the state's administrative reorganisation. Madanapalle serves as the district's administrative headquarters. Other major urban centres in the district include Pileru, Punganur, and Rayachoti, which function as other important hubs for administration, commerce, education, and regional connectivity.

== Etymology ==
The district is named after Rajampet Lok Sabha constituency & Annamacharya, a 15th-century Hindu saint from Tallapaka, Kadapa district, and the earliest known Indian musician to compose songs called sankirtanas in praise of the Hindu deity Venkateswara.

== History ==
Annamayya district was formed on 4 April 2022 from parts of the former Chittoor and YSR Kadapa districts as part of the reorganisation of districts in Andhra Pradesh, with parliamentary constituencies serving as the basis for the new boundaries. The district was initially formed based on the Rajampet Lok Sabha constituency.

In 2025, the district boundaries were reorganised and consolidated. As part of this reorganisation, the Rajampet area was merged back into Kadapa district, Kodur was transferred to Tirupati district, and Punganur from Chittoor district was added to Annamayya district.

== Geography ==
Annamayya district is located in the extreme southwestern part of Andhra Pradesh. It forms part of the Rayalaseema region. The district is bounded by Tirupati district to the east, Sri Sathya Sai to the west, Kadapa district to the north, and Chittoor district to the south. It also shares its south-western boundary with the Chikballapur and Kolar districts of Karnataka.

=== Natural resources ===
The district is characterised by undulating terrain and hill ranges forming part of the Eastern Ghats. The district includes plateau regions, fertile valleys, and rugged hills. The Madanapalle region consists of gently undulating plateaus with black and red soils, supporting extensive agriculture and patches of scrub and forest, which are home to birds such as grey partridge (kamju in Telugu) and quail. The Pileru region, lying close to the Seshachalam Hills, features rugged hills, narrow valleys, and dry deciduous forests that support wildlife including bonnet macaques (Macaca radiata), grey langurs, and occasional leopards. This region is also notable for the endangered red sandalwood (Pterocarpus santalinus), which is found in the eastern forested slopes of Pileru. The Rayachoty region is a transitional zone with rocky terrain, scattered hillocks, and fertile valleys, where mineral resources such as limestone and barytes are found. The Punganur region, on the south-western plateau, consists of open plains interspersed with low hills, with black soil dominating agricultural lands and forest patches providing habitat for small mammals and birds. Seasonal streams originating from the hills drain the district and support local irrigation, and the average annual rainfall is about 743.7 mm, generally increasing from the north-western parts towards the south-east.

== Demographics ==
Religions in Annamayya district based on the 2011 census
| Religion | Percent |
| Hinduism | 79.80% |
| Islam | 19.44% |
| Christianity | 0.47% |
| Other or not stated | 0.29% |

According to the 2011 census, Annamayya District had a population of 1422605, of which 374714 (26.34%) lived in urban areas. The district has a sex ratio of 990 females for every 1,000 males. Scheduled Castes and Scheduled Tribes account for 166,664 (11.72%) and 43,181 (3.04%) of the population, respectively.

Languages of Annamayya district based on the 2011 census
1. Telugu (79.35%)
2. Urdu (18.50%)
3. Lambadi (1.23%)
4. Others (0.92%)

According to the 2011 census, 79.35% of the population spoke Telugu, 18.50% spoke Urdu, and 1.23% spoke Lambadi as their first language.

== Administrative divisions ==
=== Mandals ===
The district is divided into three revenue divisions: Madanapalle, Pileru, and Rayachoti. These divisions are further subdivided into a total of 25 mandals and are administered by either a Sub-Collector or a Revenue Divisional Officer (RDO), depending on the division. The mandals are:

1. Madanapalle revenue division
  1. Beerangi Kothakota
  2. Chowdepalle
  3. Kurabalakota
  4. Madanapalle
  5. Mulakalacheruvu
  6. Nimmanapalle
  7. Peddamandyam
  8. Peddathippasamudram
  9. Punganur
  10. Ramasamudram
  11. Thamballapalle
2. Pileru revenue division
  1. Gurramkonda
  2. Kalakada
  3. Kalikiri
  4. Kambhamvaripalle
  5. Pileru
  6. Sodam
  7. Somala
  8. Vayalpad
3. Rayachoti revenue division
  1. Chinnamandyam
  2. Galiveedu
  3. Lakkireddipalli
  4. Ramapuram
  5. Rayachoti
  6. Sambepalli

== Politics ==
There is one Lok Sabha constituency named Rajampet, along with six assembly constituencies in the district.

The assembly constituencies are given below.

| Constituency number | Name | Reserved for (SC/ST/None) | Parliamentary constituency |
|---|---|---|---|
| 128 | Rayachoti | None | Rajampet |
| 162 | Thamballapalle | None | Rajampet |
| 163 | Pileru | None | Rajampet |
| 164 | Madanapalle | None | Rajampet |
| 165 | Punganur (partial) | None | Rajampet |

== Cities and towns ==
There are three municipalities and one nagar panchayat in the district.

Municipal Bodies in Annamayya District
| Ciy/Town | Civil status | Revenue Division | Population(2011) |
|---|---|---|---|
| Madanapalle | Municipality | Madanapalle | 180,180 |
| Rayachoti | Municipality | Rayachoti | 98,299 |
| Pileru | Major Panchayath | Pileru | 60,253 |
| Punganur | Municipality | Madanapalle | 54,746 |

== Economy ==
Agriculture is the primary economic activity of the district. The major crops cultivated include paddy, groundnut, sunflower, cotton, and betel leaves. Horticulture also contributes significantly to the local economy, with mango, papaya, banana, lemon, and sweet orange being the principal horticultural crops. As of the 2019–20 fiscal year, the district recorded a gross cropped area of 171,617 hectares and a gross irrigated area of 66,281 hectares. Irrigation is mainly supported by the Pincha project, which are the major irrigation initiatives serving the district.

== Transport ==
=== Roadways ===
The road network of the region is supported by a well-distributed hierarchy of roads, ensuring connectivity between major towns and rural areas. It includes National Highways, State Highways, major district roads, and Panchayat Raj roads that together form the backbone of transportation. National Highways NH-71, NH-40, NH-42, and NH-340 pass through and around district providing direct inter-town connectivity. Pileru serves as a major junction connecting Madanapalle and Tirupati, while Rayachoty is linked through north–south corridors. In addition, several state highways and major district roads strengthen indirect connections between these towns.

1. National Highway 40 (India) – Runs from Kurnool to Ranipet (Tamil Nadu); passes through Rayachoty and Pileru in the district. NH 40 intersects with NH 71 at Pileru junction, making it a major connectivity point.

2. National Highway 71 (India) – Extends from Madanapalle to Naidupeta (Tirupati district); touches Pileru and Madanapalle. It crosses NH 40 at Pileru junction.

3. National Highway 42 (India) – Runs from Anantapur to Ranipet (Tamil Nadu); passes through Madanapalle and Punganur within the district.

4. National Highway 340 (India) – Connects Rayachoty with Madanapalle, serving as an important inter-district and regional route.

National Highway 370 (NH-370) is a proposed National Highway planned to run from Nellore to Anantapuram via Rapur, Chitvel, Rajampet, Rayachoty, and Kadiri. The highway is intended to strengthen east–west connectivity between coastal Andhra and the Rayalaseema region, with Rayachoty clearly included in the proposed alignment.

In addition, there is a sanctioned road corridor from the Karnataka border through Punganur to Rompicherla, aimed at improving inter-state and regional connectivity. This route is not yet declared a National Highway and is currently planned as a State Highway or Major District Road, but it holds official sanction for development.

=== APSRTC ===
Road-based public transport in the Annamayya region is operated by the Andhra Pradesh State Road Transport Corporation (APSRTC). Major towns in the region are served by APSRTC bus stations and depots, which manage fleet operations and provide regular passenger services to nearby districts, state capitals, and rural mandals.

In addition to APSRTC, the Karnataka State Road Transport Corporation (KSRTC) operates inter-state bus services in the region. KSRTC runs services to Tirupati via Madanapalle and Pileru, providing an important inter-state and pilgrimage travel link.

Madanapalle and Punganur, located close to the Andhra Pradesh–Karnataka border, function as key inter-state transport points. Both towns are served by APSRTC and KSRTC buses, offering regular connectivity to various destinations in Karnataka, in addition to services within Andhra Pradesh.

The prominent APSRTC bus stations and depots in the Annamayya region include:

Madanapalle-I (MPL-1)

Madanapalle-II (MPL-2)

Pileru (PLR)

Punganur (PGNR)

Rayachoty (RCT)

=== Railways ===
The district is served by a 111 km long broad-gauge railway network with 09 railway stations, all falling under the Guntakal railway division of the South Coastal Railway Zone. Madanapalle Road railway station, located about 12 km from Madanapalle, lies on the Guntakal–Pakala–Tirupati line and serves as the major railhead for the Madanapalle region. Piler railway station is another important station on the same line, acting as a key halt for nearby mandals.

The stations between Piler and Tanakallu form part of the continuous 'Guntakal–Pakala–Tirupati line. Listed from east to west (Pakala side to Guntakal side), the stations are :

- Piler (PIL)
- Kalikiri (KCI)
- Vayalpad (VLD)
- Madanapalle Road (MPL)
- Kurabalakota (KBA)
- Tummanamgutta (TAT)
- Battulapuram (BTM)
- Mulakalacheruvu (MCU)
- Tanakallu (TKU)

In addition, a proposed railway line between Kadapa and Bangalore has been planned. The alignment is proposed to pass through Kadapa, a new station at Rayachoty, Vayalpad, and Madanapalle, before entering Karnataka, which would significantly enhance regional and inter-state rail connectivity once completed.

=== Airways ===
The nearest airports are Kempegowda International Airport, Bengaluru, which is 114 kilometres (71 mi), Tirupati International Airport, which is 128 kilometres (80 mi) & Kadapa Airport which is 131 kilometres (81 mi), located from Madanapalle.

== Education ==
The region is home to several nationally and internationally recognised educational institutions. Rishi Valley School, founded by Jiddu Krishnamurti, is well known for pioneering the multi-grade teaching methodology and is internationally regarded for its alternative education model. Besant Theosophical College, established by Annie Besant, is another prominent institution located in Madanapalle with historical importance in higher education.

The district has a growing presence of technical, professional, and medical institutions.Madanapalle Institute of Technology and Science (MITS) has attained university status, marking a significant milestone in higher education in the region. Major engineering institutions include Viswam Engineering College Madanapalle, Sri Sai Institute of Science and Technology (SSITS) Rayachoti, and MJR College of Engineering and Technology (MJRCET) Pileru.

Medical education in the district is provided by the Government Medical College Madanapalle, which serves as the principal government medical institution in the Annamayya region. The college plays a key role in training medical professionals and strengthening healthcare services for the surrounding districts.

== Tourism ==
Horsley Hills is a major hill station in the region in this district located near Madanapalle.

== Indian hub of tomato ==
Madanapalle is widely recognised as a major centre for tomato cultivation and trade and is often referred to as an Asian hub of tomato production. The region benefits from favourable climatic conditions, fertile soils, and assured irrigation, enabling year-round cultivation. Large tomato markets, extensive cold storage facilities, and efficient transport networks support the movement of produce to major markets across Andhra Pradesh, Karnataka, Tamil Nadu, and other parts of India. Tomato cultivation and trading form a key component of Madanapalle's economy, providing livelihoods to farmers, traders, and allied sectors.

== Notable people ==
1. Jiddu Krishnamurthy – Indian philosopher
2. Pattipati Ramaiah Naidu – Indian Physicist and Father of Medical Physics
3. Nallari Kiran Kumar Reddy – Former Chief Minister of United Andhra Pradesh
4. P. V. Midhun Reddy (Member Of Parliament Rajampeta (AP) & Former Panel Speaker Of Lok Sabha)
5. Bindu Madhavi - Indian actress who has appeared in Tamil and Telugu films
6. Kiran Abbavaram – Tollywood actor
7. Harishankar Reddy – Cricketer, played for Chennai Super Kings in the Indian Premier League
