= Madanapalle revenue division =

- Revenue division in Annamayya district
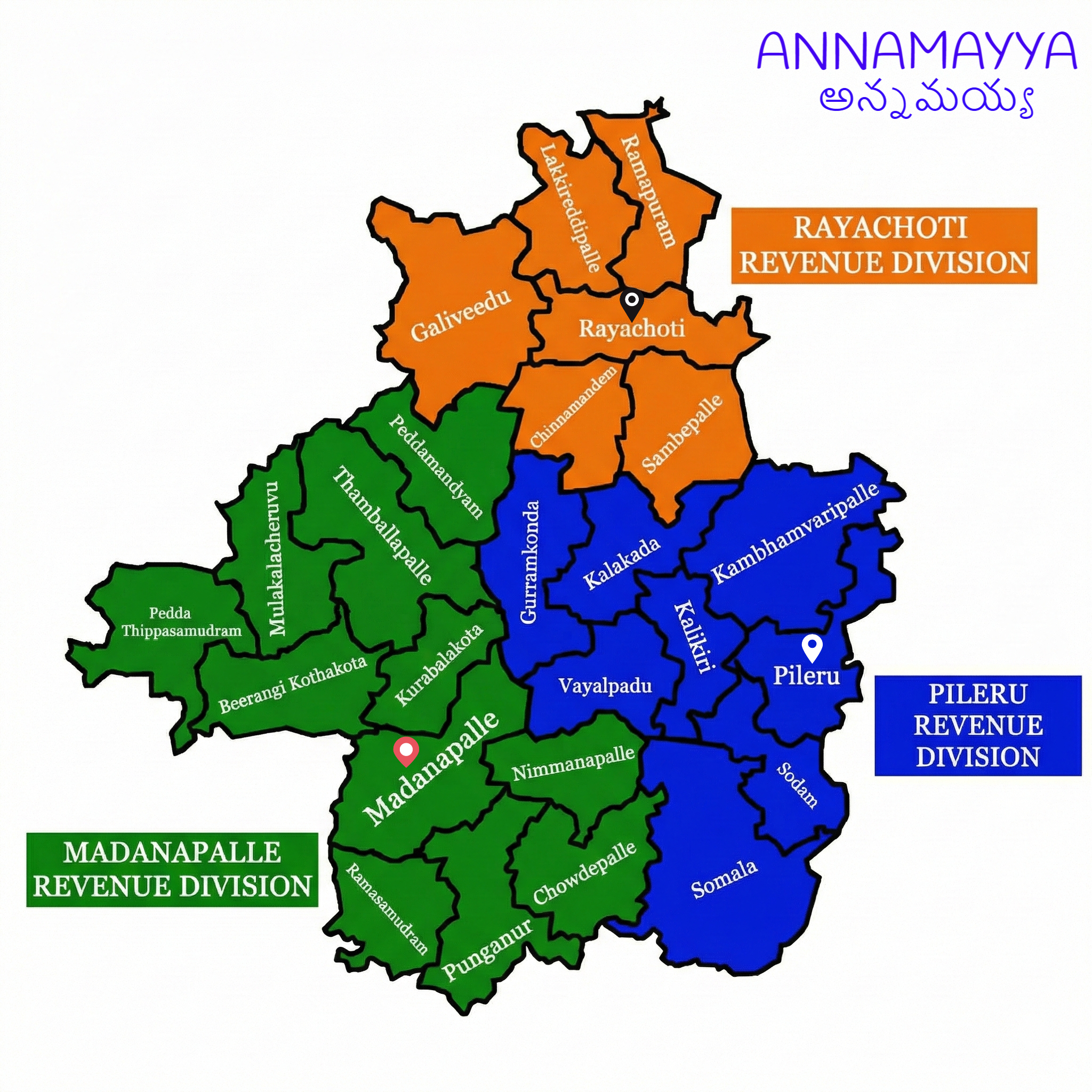
- Madanapalle revenue division in Annamayya district
- Country: India
- State: Andhra Pradesh
- District: Annamayya
- Headquarters: Madanapalle
- Time zone: UTC+05:30 (IST)

Madanapalle revenue division is an administrative division in the Annamayya district of the Indian state of Andhra Pradesh. It is the largest and one of the 3 revenue divisions in the district with 11 mandals under its administration. Madanapalle serves as the headquarters of the Annamayya district and this division. The division has only three Municipalities they are Madanapalle,B.Kothakota,Punganur.

== Administration ==
The details of the mandals and urban settlements in the division are:

Mandals	B.Kothakota, Chowdepalle, Kurabalakota, Madanapalle, Mulakalacheruvu, Nimmanapalle, Peddamandyam, Peddathippasamudram, Punganur, Ramasamudram, Thamballapalle
Municipality	Madanapalle, B.Kothakota,Punganur

== History ==
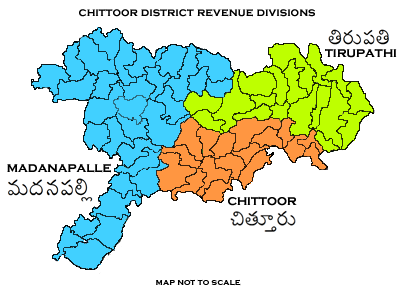
Madanapalle Revenue Division before April 2022

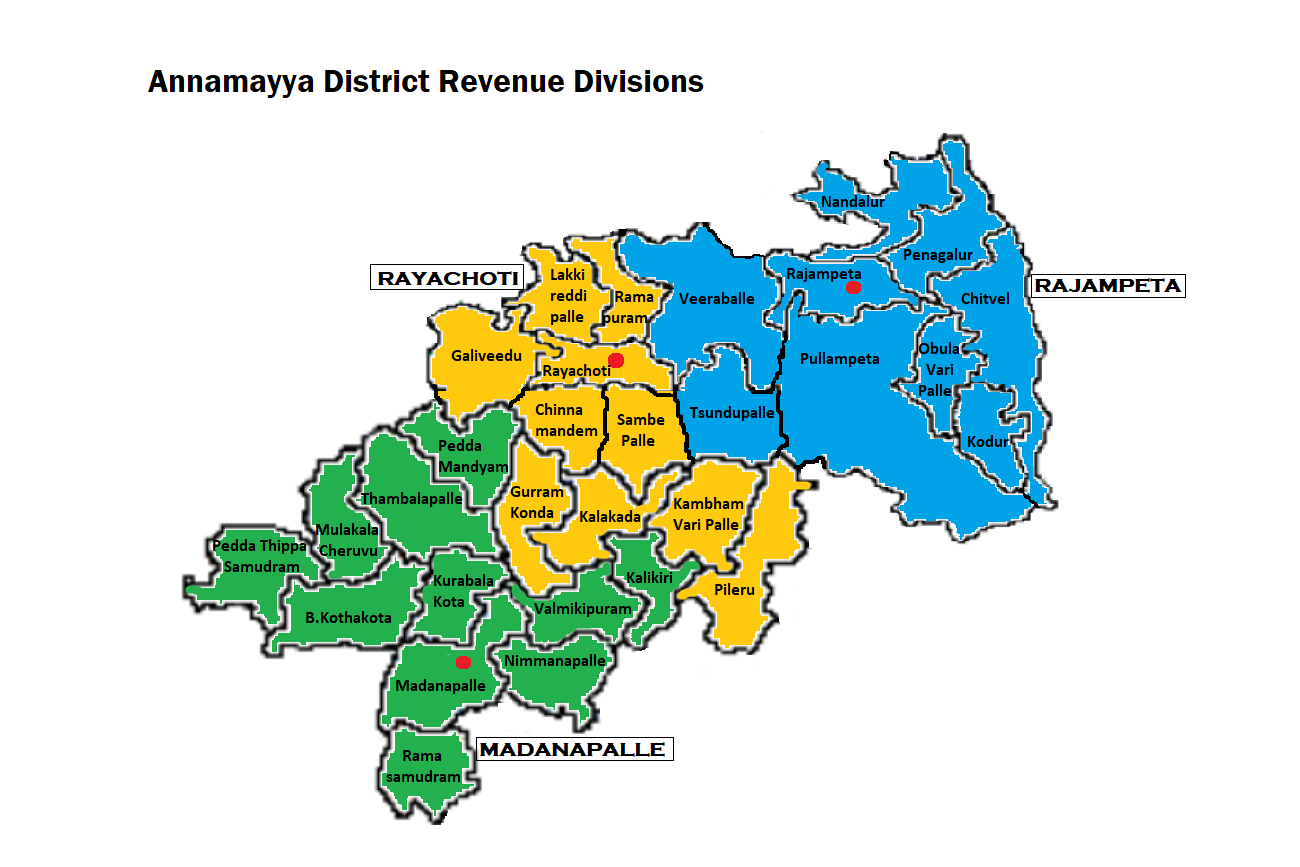
Madanapalle Revenue Division before December 2025

The revenue division was originally a part of Chittoor district and was made part of the newly formed Annamayya district on 4 April 2022.

== See also ==
- List of revenue divisions in Andhra Pradesh
- List of mandals in Andhra Pradesh
- Pileru revenue division
- Rayachoti revenue division
