= Mohammed Shahjahan Basha =

Indian politician

Member of Legislative Assembly Andhra Pradesh
- Incumbent
- Assumed office 2024
- Preceded by: Mohammed Nawaz Basha
- Constituency: Madanapalle
- In office 2009–2014
- Preceded by: Dommalapati Ramesh
- Succeeded by: Dr. M. S. Desai Thippa Reddy
- Constituency: Madanapalle

Personal details
- Born: 1971 (age 54–55)
- Party: Telugu Desam Party (10 March 2023 – present)
- Other political affiliations: Indian National Congress (before 10 March 2023)

Mohammed Shahjahan Basha (born 1971) is an Indian politician from Andhra Pradesh. He is an MLA from Madanapalle Assembly constituency in Annamayya district. He represents Telugu Desam Party. He won the 2024 Andhra Pradesh Legislative Assembly election where TDP had an alliance with BJP and Jana Sena Party.

== Early life and education ==
Basha is from Madanapalle. He completed his SSC from Arogyavaram English Medium High School, Arogyavaram in 1985.

== Political career ==
Basha won the 2024 Andhra Pradesh Legislative Assembly election from Madanapalle Assembly constituency representing Telugu Desam Party. He polled 97,980 votes and defeated his nearest rival, Nissar Ahmed, of YSR Congress Party by a margin of 5,509 votes. In 2019, Basha contested the 2019 Indian general election in Andhra Pradesh from Rajampet on Indian National Congress ticket but lost the election.
