= Valasapalle =

- Village
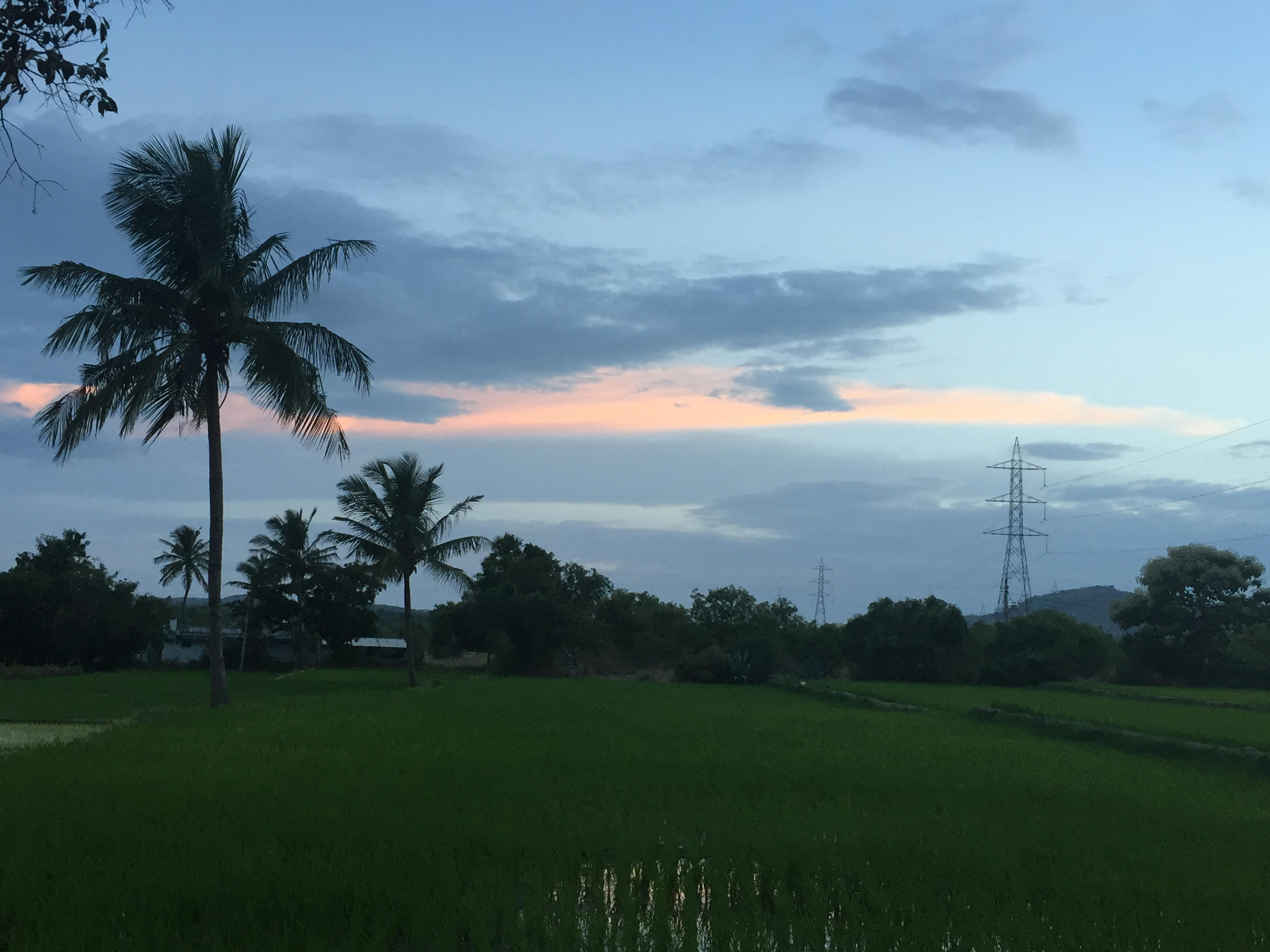
- Interactive map of Valasapalle
- Location in Andhra Pradesh, India Valasapalle (India)
- Coordinates: 13°30′27″N 78°32′57″E
- Country: India
- State: Andhra Pradesh
- District: Annamayya
- Mandal: Madanapalle

Languages
  - Official: Telugu
- Time zone: UTC+5:30 (IST)
- PIN: 517325
- Vehicle registration: AP-03

Valasapalle (lit/eng term. 'Migration Village') is a village in Madanapalle mandal, Annamayya district of the Indian state of Andhra Pradesh. The village is also a major exporter of farmed goods for the Madanapalle revenue division. The village has vast farmlands that are used to produce many crops; with rural settlements still being present. It is located 8 km (5.0 mi) away from the city of Madanapalle. During certain times of the year, the village attracts visitors due to it being located in relatively close proximity to the prominent Boyakonda Gangamma pilgrimage site.

== Demographics ==
According to the 2011 census, Valasapalle has a population of 4,171. The overall literacy rate for the village was 68.86%, of which 76.41% Males and 60.70% females were literate.

=== Languages ===
The main dialect of the village is Telugu, with some of the population speaking Hindi; along with English

=== Religion ===
The main religion of the area is Hinduism, followed by Islam and Christianity.

== Governance and politics ==
Valasapalle is a Gram Panchayat village and is governed by a sarpanch whom is elected by a cabinet of panch's, these cabinet members serve for a period of 5 years.

== Transport ==
=== Roads ===
The villages main road is its namesake Valasapalli Rd.

=== Bus ===
The village has a local bus stop (Nadigadda Bus Stop).

=== Rail ===
The closest railway station is Madanapalle Railway Station, which is located 13 km (8.1 mi) away.

== Climate ==
Climate data for Valasapalle (Madanapalle)
Month	Jan	Feb	Mar	Apr	May	Jun	Jul	Aug	Sep	Oct	Nov	Dec	Year
Mean daily maximum °C (°F)	27.3 (81.1)	30.2 (86.4)	33.4 (92.1)	34.9 (94.8)	35 (95)	32.1 (89.8)	30.2 (86.4)	30.1 (86.2)	29.9 (85.8)	28.6 (83.5)	26.8 (80.2)	25.7 (78.3)	30.4 (86.6)
Mean daily minimum °C (°F)	15.5 (59.9)	16.8 (62.2)	19.4 (66.9)	22.2 (72.0)	23.6 (74.5)	22.8 (73.0)	21.8 (71.2)	21.8 (71.2)	21.2 (70.2)	20.2 (68.4)	17.8 (64.0)	15.6 (60.1)	19.9 (67.8)
Average precipitation mm (inches)	4 (0.2)	2 (0.1)	3 (0.1)	28 (1.1)	61 (2.4)	51 (2.0)	81 (3.2)	73 (2.9)	111 (4.4)	143 (5.6)	54 (2.1)	32 (1.3)	643 (25.4)

Source : Climate
