= Madanapalle Assembly constituency =

Constituency of the Andhra Pradesh Legislative Assembly, India

Coordinates: 13.56°N 78.50°E

Madanapalle
- Constituency No. 164 for the Andhra Pradesh Legislative Assembly
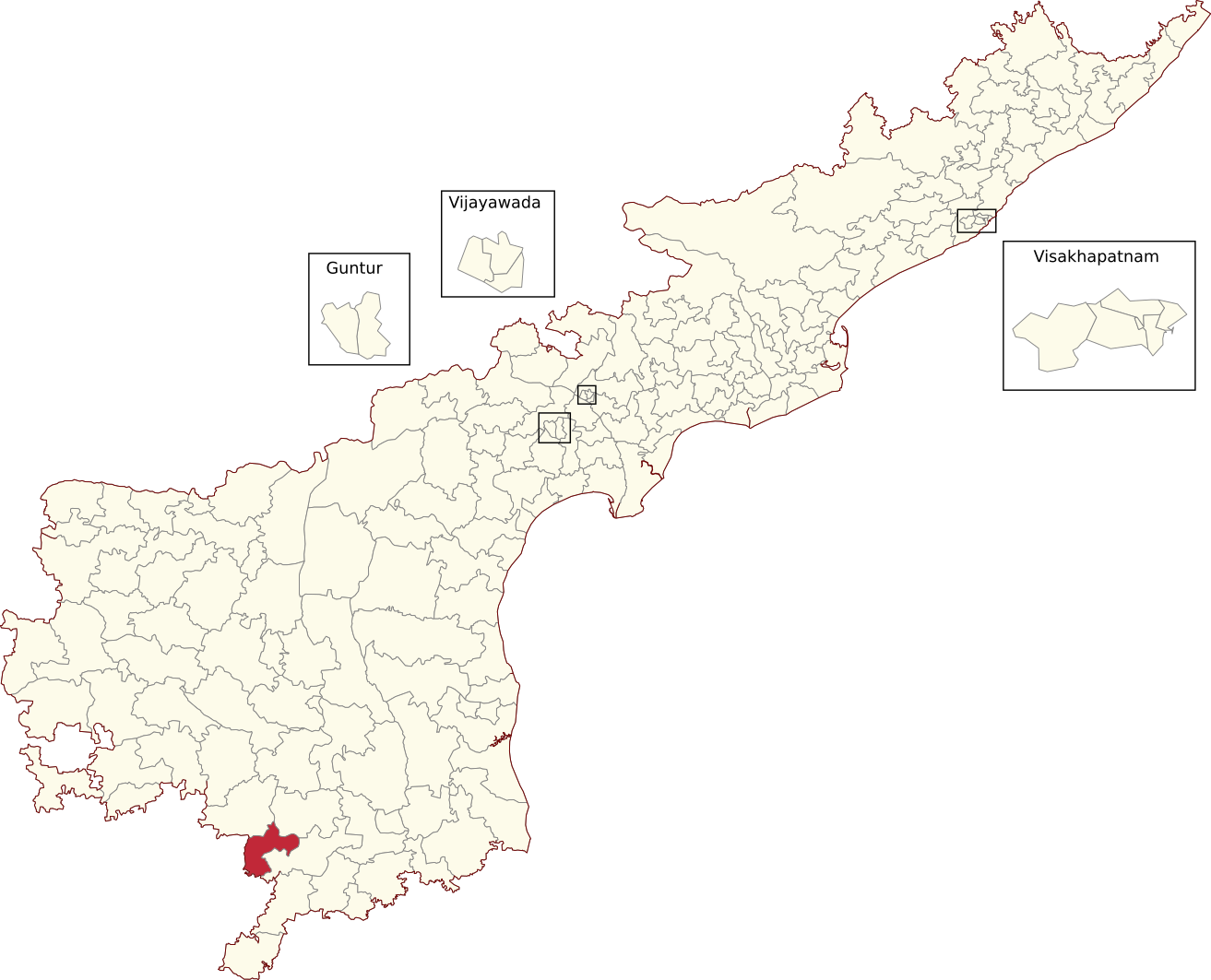
- Location of Madanapalle Assembly constituency within Andhra Pradesh

Constituency details
- Country: India
- Region: South India
- State: Andhra Pradesh
- District: Annamayya
- Lok Sabha constituency: Rajampet
- Established: 1951
- Total electors: 246,132
- Reservation: None

Member of Legislative Assembly
- 16th Andhra Pradesh Legislative Assembly
- Incumbent Mohammed Shahjahan Basha
- Party: TDP
- Alliance: NDA
- Elected year: 2024

Madanapalle Assembly constituency is a constituency in Annamayya district of Andhra Pradesh that elects representatives to the Andhra Pradesh Legislative Assembly in India. It is one the seven assembly segments of Rajampet Lok Sabha constituency.

Mohammed Shahjahan Basha is the current MLA of the constituency, having won the 2024 Andhra Pradesh Legislative Assembly election. As of 2019, there are a total of 246,132 electors in the constituency. The constituency was established in 1951, as per the Delimitation Orders (1951).

== Mandals ==
Mandal
Ramasamudram
Madanapalle
Nimmanapalli

== Members of the Legislative Assembly ==
Year	Member	Political party
1952	Dodda Seetharamiah	Communist Party of India
1955	T. Gopalakrishnayya Gupta	Indian National Congress
1962	Dodda Seetharamiah	Communist Party of India
1967	Alluri Narasinga Rao	Indian National Congress
1972	Alluri Narasinga Rao	Indian National Congress
1978	Gangarapu Venkata Narayana Reddy	Indian National Congress
1983	Ratakonda Narayana Reddy	Telugu Desam Party
1985	Ratakonda Narayana Reddy	Telugu Desam Party
1989	Avula Mohan Reddy	Indian National Congress
1994	Ratakonda Krishna Sagar	Telugu Desam Party
1999	Ratakonda Shoba	Telugu Desam Party
2004	Dommalapati Ramesh	Telugu Desam Party
2009	Mohammed Shahjahan Basha	Indian National Congress
2014	Dr. M. S. Desai Thippa Reddy	YSR Congress Party
2019	M. Nawaz Basha	YSR Congress Party
2024	Mohammed Shahjahan Basha	Telugu Desam Party

== Election results ==
=== 1952 ===
1952 Madras Legislative Assembly election: Madanapalle
Party	Candidate	Votes	%	±%
CPI	Dodda Seetharamiah	9,760	23.92%	
Independent	Gudreddigari Srinivasareddy	8,842	21.67%	
INC	Tangatuni Gopalakrishnayya Gupta	5,712	14.00%	14.00%
Independent	Pagaka Lakshmipathy	4,946	12.12%	
Independent	Chintala Ramanarayanareddy	4,116	10.09%	
Independent	Khaji Muhammad Sultan	3,476	8.52%	
KMPP	Chintala Rami Reddi	3,032	7.43%	
Independent	Pulagiri Isiah Dawson	924	2.26%	
Margin of victory		918	2.25%	
Turnout		40,808	62.14%	
Registered electors		65,668		
CPI win (new seat)				

=== 2009 ===
2009 Andhra Pradesh Legislative Assembly election: Madanapalle
Party	Candidate	Votes	%	±%
INC	M. Shahjahan Basha	53,456	38.81	
TDP	R. Krishna Sagar Reddy	42,584	30.92	
PRP	C. Vasudeva Reddy	33,167	24.08	
Majority		46,938	26.47	
Turnout		1,37,738		
INC gain from TDP		Swing		

=== 2014 ===
2014 Andhra Pradesh Legislative Assembly election: Madanapalle
Party	Candidate	Votes	%	±%
YSRCP	Desai Thippa Reddy	81,252	48.08	
BJP	Challapalle Narasimha Reddy	64,663	38.27	
Majority		16,589	15.97	
Turnout		168,993	9.82	
YSRCP gain from INC		Swing		

=== 2019 ===
2019 Andhra Pradesh Legislative Assembly election: Madanapalle
Party	Candidate	Votes	%	±%
YSRCP	Mohammed Nawaz Basha	92,066	51.20	
TDP	Dommalapati Ramesh	62,418	34.71	
JSP	Swathi Gangarapu	14,601	8.12	
INC	D Mohana Rami Reddy	2693	1.50	
Majority		27,403	15.97	
Turnout		171,604		
YSRCP hold		Swing		

=== 2024 ===
2024 Andhra Pradesh Legislative Assembly election: Madanapalle
Party	Candidate	Votes	%	±%
TDP	Mohammed Shahjahan Basha	97,980	48.3	
YSRCP	Nisar Ahmed	92471	45.58	
INC	Pawan Kumar Reddy	6051	2.98	
NOTA	None Of The Above	1759	0.87	
Majority		5509	2.71	
Turnout		202871		
TDP gain from YSRCP		Swing		

== See also ==
- List of constituencies of Andhra Pradesh Vidhan Sabha
