= Kolusu Parthasarathy =

Indian politician

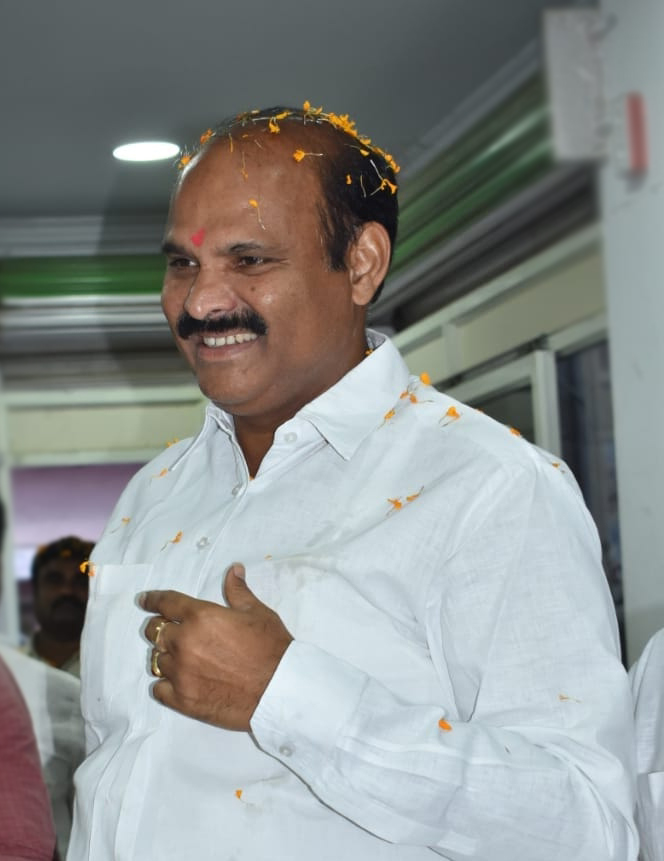

Minister of Housing Government of Andhra Pradesh
- Incumbent
- Assumed office 12 June 2024
- Governor: S. Abdul Nazeer
- Chief Minister: N. Chandrababu Naidu
- Preceded by: Jogi Ramesh

Minister of Information & Public Relations Government of Andhra Pradesh
- Incumbent
- Assumed office 12 June 2024
- Governor: S. Abdul Nazeer
- Chief Minister: N. Chandrababu Naidu
- Preceded by: Chelluboyina Venugopala Krishna

Minister of Secondary Education Government of Andhra Pradesh
- In office 25 November 2010 – 21 February 2014
- Governor: E. S. L. Narasimhan
- Chief Minister: Nallari Kiran Kumar Reddy
- Preceded by: Mopidevi Venkataramana
- Succeeded by: President's Rule

Minister of Animal Husbandry, Fisheries and Dairy Development Government of Andhra Pradesh
- In office 25 May 2009 – 24 November 2010
- Governor: N. D. Tiwari; E. S. L. Narasimhan
- Chief Minister: Y. S. Rajasekhara Reddy; Konijeti Rosaiah
- Preceded by: Mandali Buddha Prasad
- Succeeded by: Thota Narasimham

Member of Legislative Assembly Andhra Pradesh
- Incumbent
- Assumed office 2024
- Preceded by: Meka Venkata Pratap Apparao
- Constituency: Nuzvidu
- In office 2019–2024
- Preceded by: Bode Prasad
- Succeeded by: Bode Prasad
- Constituency: Penamaluru
- In office 2009–2014
- Preceded by: Constituency Established
- Succeeded by: Bode Prasad
- Constituency: Penamaluru
- In office 2004–2009
- Preceded by: Anna Babu Rao
- Succeeded by: Constituency Dissolved
- Constituency: Vuyyuru

Personal details
- Born: Kolusu Parthasarathy 18 April 1965 (age 61) Karakampadu, Andhra Pradesh, India
- Party: Telugu Desam Party (2024-present)
- Other political affiliations: YSR Congress Party (2014-2024); Indian National Congress (2004-2014)
- Spouse: K. Kamala Lakshmi
- Children: 1
- Parent: Kolusu PedareddaiahYadav (father)

Kolusu Parthasarathy Yadav (born 18 April 1965) is an Indian politician. He is currently serving as the cabinet minister in the Government of Andhra Pradesh. He represents the Telugu Desam Party from Nuzvid Assembly Constituency, Krishna District of Andhra Pradesh. He was elected to the Andhra Pradesh Legislative Assembly for four terms, in 2004, 2009, 2019 and 2024. Elected first in 2004 from the Vuyyur Constituency, and then in 2009 and 2019 elected from the Penamaluru Constituency. Parthasarathy joined Telugu Desam Party prior to 2024 Andhra Pradesh Legislative Assembly election.

He served as Minister for Animal Husbandry, Dairy Development, Fisheries and Veterinary University in the cabinet of Y.S. Rajasekhar Reddy. Pardha Saradhy was allotted the portfolio of Secondary Education, Govt.Examinations, and Intermediate Education. He was the last Minister for Secondary Education for united Andhra Pradesh.

== Early life ==
Parthasarathy was born on 18 April 1965 at Karakampadu, Krishna district, Andhra Pradesh, in a political family. His father, Kolusu Peda Reddaiah, is a politician and in 1991 and 1996 was elected as Member of Machilipatnam Lok Sabha Constituency. His mother was a housewife.

== Political career ==
As a member of the Indian National Congress (INC) party, he was elected as an MLA for the first time in 2004 elections from Vuyyur Assembly Constituency. He is the last MLA from Vuyyur Assembly Constituency. He served as Minister for Animal Husbandry, Dairy Development, Fisheries and Veterinary University in the cabinet of Y. S. Rajasekhar Reddy and continued with the same ministry in K. Rosaiah's team. Parthasarathy was elected to Assembly from Penamaluru Constituency for the second term in the 2009 elections, after reorganisation of the constituencies. In the re-formation of the cabinet by N. Kiran Kumar Reddy, Saradhy was allotted the portfolio of Secondary Education, Govt. Examinations, A. P. Residential Educational Institutions Society, Hyderabad Public School and Intermediate Education. He was the last Minister for Secondary Education for united Andhra Pradesh. When INC divided AP into Andhra Pradesh and Telangana he resigned from the INC and played a major role in Samaikyandhra movement in Krishan District leaders.

In 2014 Parthasarathy joined YSR Congress Party. He left Penamaluru and he lost the race for the Machilipatnam Constituency in 2014. He is the working president of YSR Congress Party for Krishna District. Sarathy was fighting for Special Status for A.P. He brought all parties leaders of Krishna District onto one platform on the issue of Special Status. In the 2019 general election he contested as Member of the Andhra Pradesh Legislative Assembly for Penamaluru and he won with majority of 11,317 over the incumbent Bode Prasad.

== Achievements ==
- He was elected as an MLA for the first time in 2004 elections from Vuyyur Assembly Constituency, he is the last MLA for Vuyyur.
- He served as Minister for Animal Husbandry for the combined state of Andhra Pradesh.
- He is the last Minister for Secondary Education for the combined state of Andhra Pradesh.
- He won every time when he contested as Member of Legislative Assembly.
