= M. Nawaz Basha =

Indian politician

Mohammed Nawaz Basha (born 2 October 1973) is an Indian politician from Andhra Pradesh. He is an MLA of YSR Congress Party from Madanapalle Assembly Constituency in Chittoor District. He won the 2019 Andhra Pradesh Legislative Assembly Election. He was denied the ticket by YSRCP for the 2024 Andhra Pradesh Legislative Assembly Election.

== Early life and education ==
Basha is born in Madanapalle to M. Akbar Saheb and Rameeza Bee. He studied up to Class 9 at UMTS English medium high school, Arogyavaram, Madanapalle.

== Career ==
Basha started his political career with Indian National Congress. Later, he moved to YSR Congress Party. He won the 2019 Andhra Pradesh Legislative Assembly Election defeating Dommalapati Ramesh of Telugu Desam Party by a margin of 29,648 votes.
