= K. Koti Reddi =

Indian barrister and politician

K. Koti Reddy
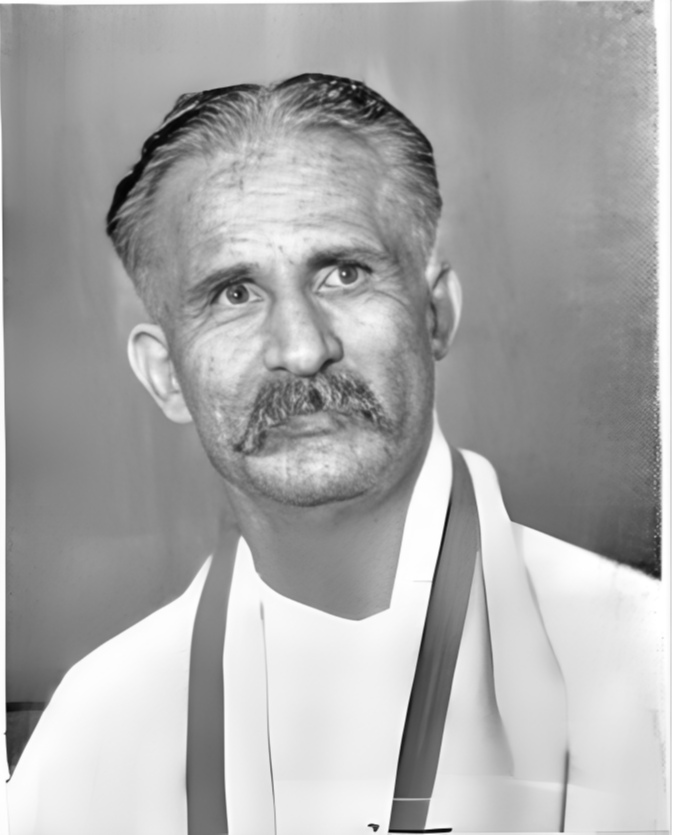

Minister of Hindu Religious Endowments, Revenue (other than Land revenue)
- In office 1 May 1946 – 23 March 1947

Personal details
- Born: October 1887 Kotireddigaripalle, Madanapalle, Andhra Pradesh
- Died: 27 th January 1981
- Party: Indian National Congress
- Education: Oxford, London
- Occupation: Barrister-at-Law, Politician

Kadapa Kotireddy (October 1887 – 1981) was an Indian barrister and politician. He was born in Kotireddigaripalle, Madanapalle and pursued his education, obtaining a B.A. degree from Madras, a B.C.L. degree from Oxford, and an L.L.B. from London. He became a Barrister-at-Law and enrolled as a High Court Advocate in 1914. He established his practice in Kadapa in 1918.

During his political career, Reddy was the Deputy Leader of the Swaraj Party in the Madras Legislative Council from 1926 to 1930. He served as the Chairman of the Rayalaseema Famine Relief Committee in 1935 and presided over various conferences of the Reddy, Bue, and Andhra Maha Sabha. He was a Member of the Senate of the Madras University and the Syndicate of Andhra University.

Reddy was elected to the Madras Legislative Assembly from the Kadapa General Rural Constituency. He served as a minister in the Prakasam cabinet, responsible for Hindu Religious Endowments, and Revenue (other than Land revenue), from 1 May 1946 to 23 March 1947. He played a prominent role in the Quit India Movement and was imprisoned for his participation.

K. Kotireddy's contributions extended beyond politics. He was actively involved in various social and nationalist movements. He accompanied Mahatma Gandhi during his Rayalaseema tour in 1919-20 and participated in the individual satyagraha movement. He was imprisoned multiple times for his activism.

Kotireddy continued his involvement in politics and served as a Member of the Legislative Assembly until 1962. He was later nominated to the Andhra Pradesh Legislative Council in 1964 and remained a member until 30 June 1970.
