= Sri Santhana Venugopala Swamy Temple, Thettu =

Temple in Andhra Pradesh

Sri Santhana Venugopala Swamy Temple
- Location within Andhra Pradesh

Religion
- Affiliation: Hinduism
- District: Annamayya district
- Deity: Lord Krishna

Location
- Location: Thettu, Near Kurabalakota
- State: Andhra Pradesh
- Country: India
- Interactive map of Sri Santhana Venugopala Swamy Temple
- Coordinates: 14.0198°N 78.7384°E

Architecture
- Type: Dravidan

Sri Santhana Venugopala Swamy is an ancient Hindu temple in Thettu Village, Kurabalakota mandal, Annamayya district, Andhra Pradesh. The Lord Venugopala Swamy Temple and Goddess Paleti Gangamma Temple are the places of worship in the village of Thettu. This deity is also known as Bala Gopala, Hucchu Gopala, or Sri Santana Venugopala.

Every year in March or April, there is an annual Srivari Brahmotsavam (chariot festival) of the deity Sri Santhana Venugopala Swamy. . The chariot festival lasts for 12 days and is attended by over 100,000 people at the vessel of Vishnu. During the special occasion on the day of Garuda Vahanam, people celebrate the great bird Garuda. A ritual known as Aradhana is performed. On Mukkoti Ekadasi, i.e., Pushya Suddha Ekadasi (December–January) fasting, vigils and bathing in the river are observed by devotees. Harikathas (listening to the stories of the Lord) are arranged. These observances have been followed for the last two centuries.

Thettu is near the 162nd milestone of Madras-Bombay (17 kilometres (11 mi) from Madanapalle) on the Grand North Trunk road in the Horsley valley 3 miles (4.8 km) from the highway, 4 miles (6.4 km) from Kurabalakota Railway Station and 17 kilometres (11 mi) from Madanapalle.

== Origin of the Temple ==
Sri Santhana Venugopala Swamy Temple is believed to have been constructed around 1800 years ago during the reign of the Cholas and Gangas. A stick (known as dandā in Hindi) in the temple is said to belong to the pre-Buddhist Saint Koundinya Maharshi. There is a Koneru (a stone-faced tank with steps) near the temple named Bahuda Koneru.

Legend has it that Lord Krishna appeared in the dreams of the Kinga Gangarasaru and revealed his whereabouts. The King, while on his way back after victory in war, got his chariot wheel stuck at the same place mentioned by Lord Krishna. King Gangarosa unearthed an idol (or statute) and took it to the Sage Koundinya Ashram. Sage Koundinya installed the idol and offered prayers. Later, this temple was renovated by the Hoysala King Veeraballava. King Veeraballava donated lands to meet temple needs in the year 1298 AD.
