= Desai Thippa Reddy =

Indian politician

M. S. Desai Thippa Reddy (born 1964) is an Indian politician from Andhra Pradesh. He was a former member of the Andhra Pradesh Legislative Assembly from Madanapalle Assembly constituency in the then Chittoor district representing the YSR Congress Party.

== Early life ==
Reddy is from Madanapalle, Chittoor district, Andhra Pradesh. He is the son of the late Desai Venkat Sidda Reddy. He completed his Master of Surgery at University of Mysore, Karnataka in 1991. His wife is also a doctor. He declared assets worth Rs.19 crore in his affidavit to the Election Commission of India.

== Career ==
Reddy won from Madanapalle Assembly constituency in the 2014 Andhra Pradesh Legislative Assembly election representing the YSR Congress. He polled 81,252 votes and defeated his nearest rival, C. Narasimha Reddy of the Bharatiya Janata Party, by a margin of 16,589 votes.
