= Sri M =

Indian spiritual leader

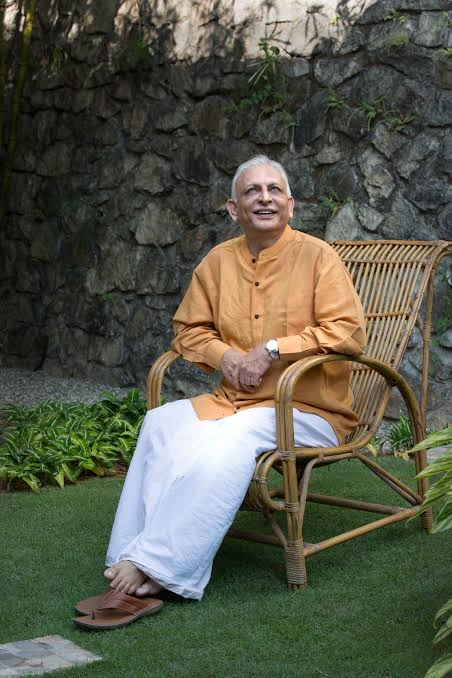
- Born: Mumtaz Ali Khan; 6 November 1948 (age 77); Trivandrum, Travancore–Cochin, Dominion of India
- Other name: Sri Madhukar Nath
- Organization: The Satsang Foundation
- Spouse: Sunanda Ali (Sunanda Sanadi)
- Children: 2
- Honors: Padma Bhushan (2020)
- Website: satsang-foundation.org

Sri M (born Mumtaz Ali Khan, 6 November 1948), also known as Sri Madhukar Nath, is an Indian yogi, spiritual guide, orator, and educationist. He belongs to the Nath tradition of Hinduism and is the disciple of Sri Maheshwarnath Babaji, who was a disciple of Sri Guru Babaji (Mahavatar Babaji). Sri M lives in Madanapalle, Andhra Pradesh, India. He received the Padma Bhushan, India's third-highest civilian award, in 2020.

== Early life ==
Mumtaz Ali Khan was born on 6 November 1948 to an affluent Muslim family in Trivandrum, Travancore (now in Kerala). In his autobiography, Apprenticed to a Himalayan Master, Sri M describes meeting his guru Sri Maheshwarnath Babaji in the backyard of his home in Trivandrum: a distinguished, youthful-looking stranger with matted hair, standing near a jackfruit tree. After a brief conversation, the stranger disappeared. This was a turning point in nine-year old Sri M's life, and he later said about the meeting:

After the jackfruit tree incident, although outwardly I looked like any other boy of that age, my personality had undergone a profound change. A secret life went on within, side by side with the ordinary activities of day-to-day existence. The inner journey had begun and the first sign of this was that I began to meditate without even knowing the word meditation.

After this, Sri M made contact with a number of South Indian saints who included Bhagawan Nityananda of Ganeshpuri, Yogi Gopala Saami, Kaladi Mastan, Swami Abhedananda, Chempazhanti Swami, Swami Tapasyananda and Mai Ma.

== Quest for self-realisation ==
According to his autobiography, Sri M left his home at age nineteen to find his master in the Himalayas. Exhausted by the search, he met Sri Maheshwarnath Babaji—the same person he had met when he was nine—at the Vyasa Gufa (cave) near Badrinath. Sri M lived with Maheshwarnath Babaji for three-and-a-half years and learned many things. Initiated into the Nath tradition. Sri M and Sri Maheshwarnath Babaji traveled to a mutt in Tholing, Tibet. His desire to meet Grand Master Sri Guru Babaji (Mahavatar Babaji) was fulfilled on Nilkantha Hill with the help of Maheshwarnath Babaji. Sri M claimed that Sri Babaji was his master in a previous life, and Maheshwarnath Babaji reportedly had the power to materialize and de-materialize in any form on earth or beyond.

== Later years ==
After spending three years in the Himalayas as a wandering yogi with his master, Sri M said that he was asked by his master to go back and prepare for his life mission. He returned from the Himalayas and traveled throughout India, meeting gurus such as Neem Karoli Baba, Lakshman Joo and J. Krishnamurti. Sri M spent substantial time in the Ramakrishna Mission and the Krishnamurti Foundation. While associated with the foundation he met his future wife, Sunanda Sanadi; they have two adult children Roshan Ali and Aisha Ali.

Sri M heads the Satsang Foundation, which runs two schools in Andhra Pradesh: the Peepal Grove School and the Satsang Vidyalaya. The Peepal Grove School, a boarding school, was inaugurated by former President of India A. P. J. Abdul Kalam in 2006. Satsang Vidyalaya is a free school for children in the Madanapalle area, where Sri M lives. The foundation began Bharat Yoga Vidya Kendra, a training programme for yoga teachers, in 2020. He writes in "Speaking Tree", a spiritual forum run by The Times of India. A documentary film, The Modern Mystic: Sri M of Madnapalle, was directed by Raja Choudhury in 2011.

In 2015, Sri M undertook a "Walk of Hope": a 7,500-kilometre (4,700 mi) padayatra from Kanyakumari to Kashmir. The walk began on 12 January, the birth anniversary of Swami Vivekananda (who had undertaken a similar journey over a century earlier). With a group of fellow travelers, Sri M walked through 11 Indian states and considered the Walk of Hope an exercise to restore the country's spirituality. The padayatra ended in Srinagar, Kashmir, on 29 April 2016.

Sri M published The Journey Continues, the second part of his autobiography, in 2017. It exceeds the earlier book in apparently-miraculous incidents; in the introduction, he wrote that his readers might think that he "had finally gone bonkers". Sri M detailed a number of his previous lives over a period of 5,000 years, during which he (or she; in several lives, he was a woman) was associated with Indian saints.

In the year 2020, Sri M was conferred with the Padma Bhushan Award for the distinguished service of high order in the field of Spirituality.

== Books ==
- Jewel in the Lotus: Deeper Aspects of Hinduism. Sterling. 1998. ISBN 978-8120720466.
- Apprenticed to a Himalayan Master: A Yogi's Autobiography. Magenta Press. 2010. ISBN 978-81-910096-0-6.
- Sri M: The Journey Continues: a Sequel to Apprenticed to a Himalayan Master. Magenta Press. 2017. ISBN 978-9382585244.
- The Upanishads: Katha - Prashna – Mundaka. Magenta Press. 2017. ISBN 9789382585206.
- On Meditation: Finding Infinite Bliss and Power Within. Penguin Books India. 2019. ISBN 978-0143447511.
- The Homecoming and Other Stories. Penguin Books India. 2020. ISBN 978-0143447528.
- Wisdom of the Rishis: The Three Upanishads: Ishavasya, Keno, Mandukya. Magenta Press. 2021. ISBN 978-8191009637.
- The Friend: Mind, Body, Soul, Well-Being. Penguin Books India. 2022. ISBN 978-0143457169.
- The Little Guide to Greater Glory and a Happier Life. Magenta Press. 2022. ISBN 978-8195608980.
