= Penamaluru Assembly constituency =

Constituency of the Andhra Pradesh Legislative Assembly, India

Coordinates: 16.46°N 80.72°E

Penamaluru
- Constituency No. 78 for the Andhra Pradesh Legislative Assembly
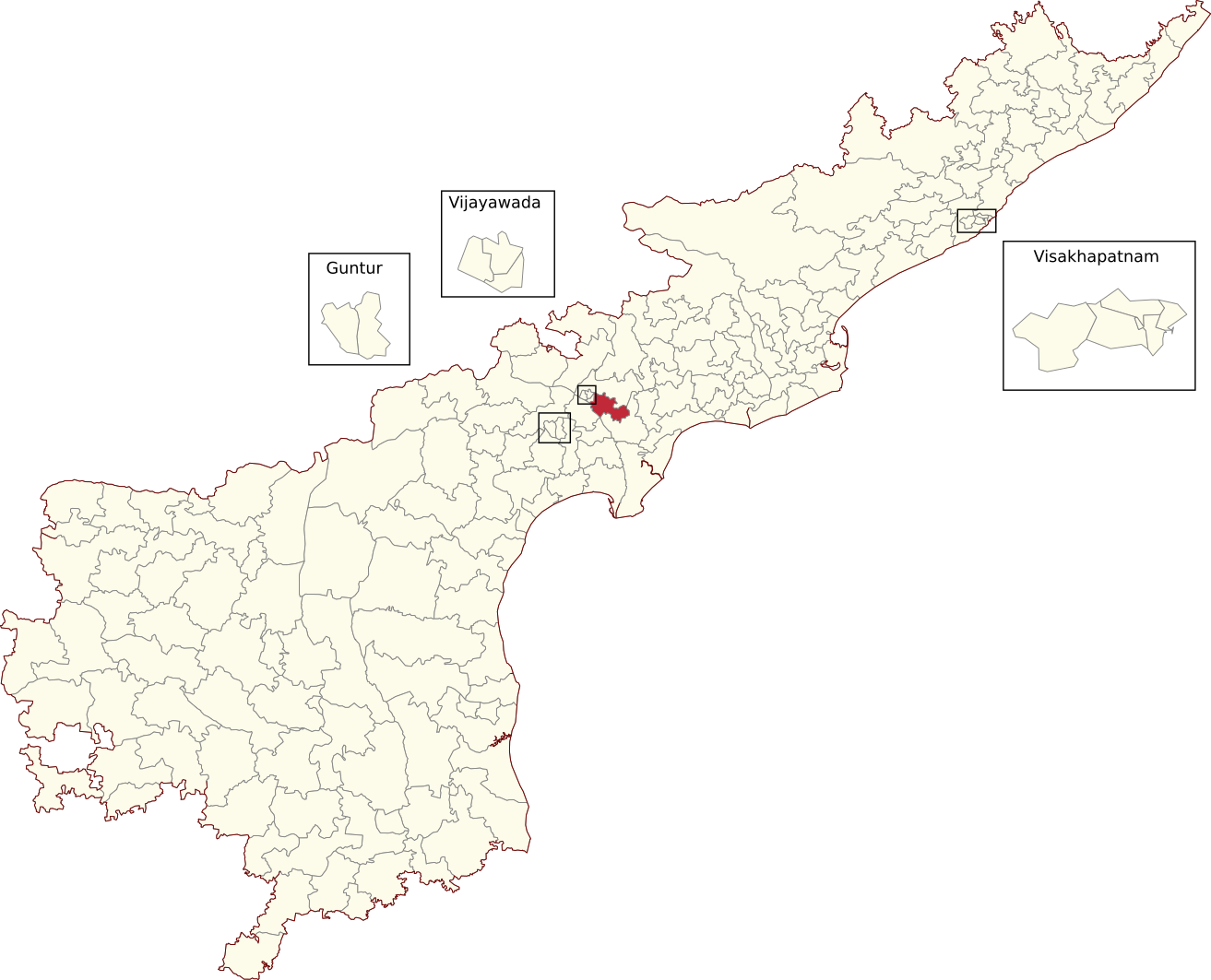
- Location of Penamaluru Assembly constituency within Andhra Pradesh

Constituency details
- Country: India
- Region: South India
- State: Andhra Pradesh
- District: Krishna
- Lok Sabha constituency: Machilipatnam
- Established: 2008
- Total electors: 267,751
- Reservation: None

Member of Legislative Assembly
- 16th Andhra Pradesh Legislative Assembly
- Incumbent Bode Prasad
- Party: TDP
- Alliance: NDA
- Elected year: 2024

Penamaluru Assembly constituency is a constituency in Krishna district of Andhra Pradesh that elects representatives to the Andhra Pradesh Legislative Assembly in India. It is one of the seven assembly segments of Machilipatnam Lok Sabha constituency.

Bode Prasad is the current MLA of the constituency, having won the 2024 Andhra Pradesh Legislative Assembly election from Bode Prasad. As of 2019, there are a total of 267,751 electors in the constituency. The constituency was established in 2008, as per the Delimitation Orders (2008).

== Mandals ==
The three mandals that form the assembly constituency are:

Mandal
Kankipadu
Vuyyuru
Penamaluru

== Members of the Legislative Assembly ==
Year	Member	Political party
2009	Kolusu Parthasarathy	Indian National Congress
2014	Bode Prasad	Telugu Desam Party
2019	Kolusu Parthasarathy	YSR Congress Party
2024	Bode Prasad	Telugu Desam Party

== Election results ==
=== 2024 ===
2024 Andhra Pradesh Legislative Assembly election: Penamaluru
Party	Candidate	Votes	%	±%
TDP	Bode Prasad	144,912	61.26	
YSRCP	Jogi Ramesh	84,997	35.93	
INC	Elisala Subramanyam	2,596	1.1	
NOTA	None of the above	1,510	0.64	
Majority		59,915	25.33	
Turnout		2,36,539		
TDP gain from YSRCP		Swing		

=== 2019 ===
2019 Andhra Pradesh Legislative Assembly election: Penamaluru
Party	Candidate	Votes	%	±%
YSRCP	Kolusu Parthasarathy	101,485	47.43	+9.35
TDP	Bode Prasad	90,168	42.14	−12.83
BSP	L.Karunakar Das	15,388	7.19	
Majority		11,317	5.29	
Turnout		2,13,929		
YSRCP gain from TDP		Swing		

=== 2014 ===
2014 Andhra Pradesh Legislative Assembly election: Penamaluru
Party	Candidate	Votes	%	±%
TDP	Bode Prasad	102,330	54.97	
YSRCP	V R Vidyasagar Kukkala	70,882	38.08	
INC	Nerella Sobhan Babu	3,336	1.79	
Majority		31,448	16.90	
Turnout		186,128	80.19	−0.52
TDP gain from INC		Swing		

=== 2009 ===
2009 Andhra Pradesh Legislative Assembly election: Penamaluru
Party	Candidate	Votes	%	±%
INC	Kolusu Parthasarathy	61,346	37.44	
TDP	Chalasani Venkateswara Rao	61,169	37.33	
PRP	Dhanekula Murali Mohana Rao	31,930	19.49	
Majority		177	0.11	
Turnout		163,851	80.19	
INC win (new seat)				

== See also ==
- List of constituencies of the Andhra Pradesh Legislative Assembly
