= Madanapalle Institute of Technology and Science =

Indian college

Coordinates: 13.6296°N 78.4785°E

MITS Deemed to be University
- Other name: MITS Madanapalle
- Motto: Shraddhavan Labhate Gnanam (Reverent Attains Wisdom)
- Type: Deemed university
- Established: 1998
- Chancellor: N. Vijaya Bhaskar Choudary
- Vice-Chancellor: C. Yuvaraj (acting)
- Dean: Sremmant Basu
- Location: Madanapalle, Andhra Pradesh, India
- Campus: Suburban
- Website: www.mits.ac.in

MITS Deemed to be University (MITS) is a Deemed to be university established in 1998 in Madanapalle, Andhra Pradesh India. MITS was an affiliate of JNTUA and is approved by AICTE, New Delhi. It became a deemed to be university in 2025.

== History ==
MITS Deemed to be University was established in 1998 in Madanapalle, Chittoor district of Andhra Pradesh, India. It is located on a 30 acres (12 ha) campus near Angallu, about 10 km (6.2 mi) away from Madanapalle.

MITS originated under the auspices of Ratakonda Ranga Reddy Educational Academy and is now under the supervision of Dr. N. Vijaya Bhaskar Choudary, PhD.

== Accomplishments ==
- 59 Funded research projects worth of Rs. 550.06 Lakhs
- The “GOLD” rated by AICTE - CII Survey of Industry - Linked Technical Institutes – 2017
- Graded as ‘AAA’ by Careers 360 for the year 2016
- World Bank (TEQIP-II) funded Institute
- MoU with IIT Hyderabad for Academic Collaboration
- State of the art Learning Management System through Moodle and MOOCs
- 100% of the faculty has a Ph.D. qualification and the faculty student ratio is 1:12
- Foreign Language Training by experts in Japanese, German, French and Spanish
- Siemens “Technical Skill Development Institution” sanctioned by Govt. of AP

== Courses ==
=== Undergraduate ===
==== Engineering ====
- B.Tech - Computer Science & Engineering (Artificial Intelligence)
- B.Tech - Electronics & Communication Engineering
- B.Tech - Civil Engineering
- B.Tech - Computer Science & Engineering
- B.Tech - Computer Science & Engineering (Cyber Security)
- B.Tech - Computer Science & Engineering (Data Science)
- B.Tech - Computer Science & Technology
- B.Tech - Computer Science & Engineering (Artificial Intelligence and Machine Learning)
- B.Tech - Electrical & Electronics Engineering
- B.Tech - Mechanical Engineering

=== Post-graduate ===
==== Engineering ====
M.Tech. - Advanced Manufacturing Systems

M.Tech. - Computer Science & Engineering

M.Tech. - Digital Electronics & Communication Systems

M.Tech. - Electrical Power Systems

M.Tech. - Structural Engineering

==== Management studies ====
- Master of Business Administration (Specialization-HR, Finance, Marketing, Systems) [Eligibility: 10+2+3/4]

==== Computer applications ====
- Master of Computer Applications[Eligibility: 10+2+3]

=== Doctoral programs ===
==== Engineering ====
- Computer Science & Engineering
- Electronics & Communication Engineering
- Mechanical Engineering
- Electrical & Electronics Engineering

==== Basic sciences and humanities ====
- Chemistry
- English
- Mathematics
- Physics

==== Management ====
- Management Sciences

== MoU ==
Madanapalle Institute of Technology & Science has MoUs with the following Institutions in different countries. : • BRNO University of Technology - Czech Republic • Innopolis University - Russia

• Maharishi Vedic University - Holland

Taiwan Universities

• Providence University • Ming Chuan University • Ming Chi University • Asia University • National United University • National Pingtung University of Science & Technology • National Yunlin University of Science & Technology • I-Shou University

South Korea Universities

• Kookmin University • Chungnam National University - Korea

Germany Universities

• European Education and Research Council (GEMS) / Indo-Euro Synchronization • Steinbeis Institute for Sustainable Resource Usage & Energy Management Tuebingen, Germany.

Fruitful discussions are going on with the following Universities in Japan for B.Tech. Internship & M S Programme. Japan Universities

• Osaka Institute of Technology • Nagoya Institute of Technology • Iwate University • Kansai University • Kwansei Gakuin University

== Associations ==
- Indian Society for Technical Education (ISTE)
- Institute of Electrical and Electronics Engineers, Inc., (IEEE)
- Industry-Institute Interaction Cell (IIIC)
- Entrepreneurship Development Cell (ED)
- Computer Society of India (CSI)
- National Service Scheme (NSS)
- National Cadet Corps (NCC)
- The Confederation of Indian Industry (CII)
- IUCEE – Indo Universal Collaboration for Engineering Education

== Affiliations ==
- Recognized by AICTE, New Delhi & Deemed to be University
- Permanent Affiliated from JNTUA, Anantapuramu
- Approved by UGC under section 2(f) & 12(B)
- NBA Accreditation to UG (ECE, EEE, CSE, MECH, Civil) & PG (MBA & MCA) Programmes
- Accredited by NAAC
- An ISO 9001 : 2015 Certified institution
- DSIR/DST Recognition for Scientific & Industrial Research
- Govt. of Andhra Pradesh conferred ‘A’ Grade status
- Recognized Research Center for Engineering, Management & Basic Sciences and Humanities under JNTUA, Anantapuramu
- NSS & NCC Programs
