= Kagitha Krishna Prasad =

Indian politician

Member of the Andhra Pradesh Legislative Assembly
- Incumbent
- Assumed office 4 June 2024
- Preceded by: Jogi Ramesh
- Constituency: Pedana

Personal details
- Born: 26 June 1982 (age 44)
- Party: Telugu Desam Party
- Spouse: Sirisha Kagitha (M 2008)
- Children: 1 - Kagitha Venkat Lalith Chandra (2011)
- Education: B Tech
- Occupation: Politician

Kagitha Krishna Prasad is an Indian politician currently serving as the MLA from Pedana constituency Andhra Pradesh. He is a member of Telugu Desam Party. He is also the spokes person of the Telugu Desam Party (TDP).

In the 2019 Andhra Pradesh Legislative Assembly election, Krishna Prasad unsuccessfully contested as a Member of the Legislative Assembly (MLA) for the Pedana Assembly constituency. In the 2024 Andhra Pradesh Legislative Assembly election, he was elected as an MLA for Pedana.

== Political career ==
He was elected as the Member of the Legislative Assembly representing the Pedana Assembly constituency in 2024 Andhra Pradesh Legislative Assembly elections.

== Early life and education ==
Krishna Prasad born in a Telugu family to kagita Venkat Rao (Former MLA Since 1985 - 2019 ) and Manikyam.He completed B.Tech from BVC Engineering.

== Electoral performance ==
2024 Andhra Pradesh Legislative Assembly election: Pedana
Party	Candidate	Votes	%	±%
TDP	Kagitha Krishna Prasad	91,394	60.95	
YSRCP	Uppala Ramesh (Ramu)	53,271	35.52	
INC	Sonti Nagaraju	1394	0.9	
NOTA	None Of The Above	1349	0.9	
Majority		38,123	25.43	
Turnout		1,49,961	90.34	
TDP hold		Swing		
