= Pedana Assembly constituency =

Constituency of the Andhra Pradesh Legislative Assembly, India

Coordinates: 16.26°N 81.14°E

Pedana
- Constituency No. 74 for the Andhra Pradesh Legislative Assembly
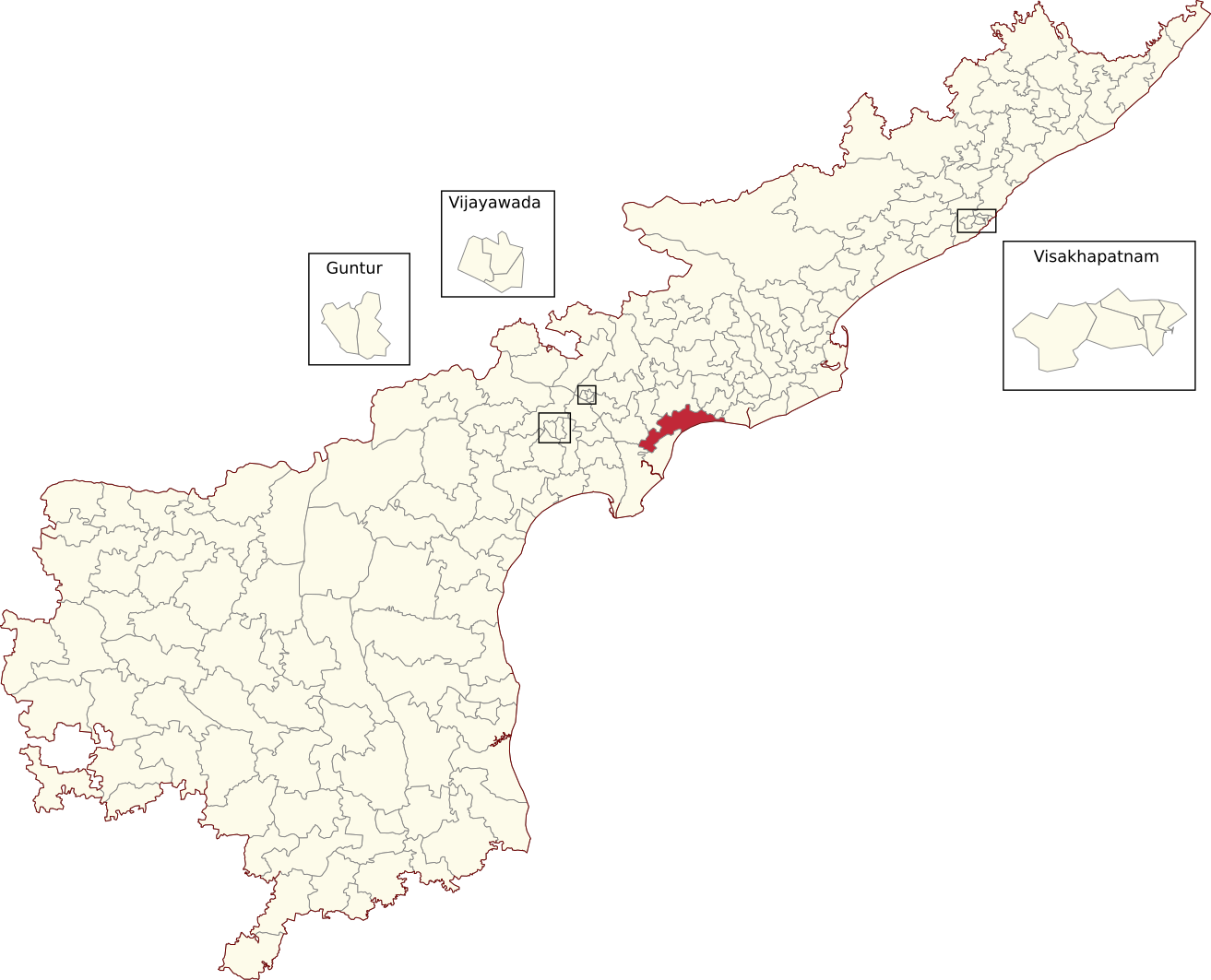
- Location of Pedana Assembly constituency within Andhra Pradesh

Constituency details
- Country: India
- Region: South India
- State: Andhra Pradesh
- District: Krishna
- Lok Sabha constituency: Machilipatnam
- Established: 2008
- Total electors: 1,65,987
- Reservation: None

Member of Legislative Assembly
- 16th Andhra Pradesh Legislative Assembly
- Incumbent Kagitha Krishna Prasad
- Party: TDP
- Alliance: NDA
- Elected year: 2024

Pedana Assembly constituency is a constituency in Krishna district of Andhra Pradesh that elects representatives to the Andhra Pradesh Legislative Assembly in India. It is one of the seven assembly segments of Machilipatnam Lok Sabha constituency.

Kagitha Krishna Prasad is the current MLA of the constituency, having won the 2024 Andhra Pradesh Legislative Assembly election from Telugu Desam Party. As of 2019, there are a total of 1,65,987 electors in the constituency. The constituency was established in 2008, as per the Delimitation Orders (2008).

== Mandals ==
The four mandals that form the assembly constituency are:

Mandal
Gudur
Pedana
Bantumilli
Kruthivennu

== Members of the Legislative Assembly ==
Year	Member	Political party
2009	Jogi Ramesh	Indian National Congress
2014	Kagitha Venkata Rao	Telugu Desam Party
2019	Jogi Ramesh	YSR Congress Party
2024	Kagitha Krishna Prasad	Telugu Desam Party

== Election results ==
=== 2024 ===
2024 Andhra Pradesh Legislative Assembly election: Pedana
Party	Candidate	Votes	%	±%
TDP	Kagitha Krishna Prasad	91,394	60.95	
YSRCP	Uppala Ramesh (Ramu)	53,271	35.52	
INC	Sonti Nagaraju	1394	0.9	
NOTA	None Of The Above	1349	0.9	
Majority		38,123	25.43	
Turnout		1,49,961	90.34	
TDP hold		Swing		

=== 2019 ===
2019 Andhra Pradesh Legislative Assembly election: Pedana
Party	Candidate	Votes	%	±%
YSRCP	Jogi Ramesh	61,920	42.46%	
TDP	Kagitha Krishnaprasad	54,081	37.08%	
JSP	Ankem Lakshmi Srinivas	25,733	17.64%	
Majority		7,839	5.38%	
Turnout		145848	87.76	
YSRCP gain from TDP		Swing		

=== 2014 ===
2014 Andhra Pradesh Legislative Assembly election: Pedana
Party	Candidate	Votes	%	±%
TDP	Kagitha Venkata Rao	71,779	53.00	
YSRCP	Buragadda Vedavyas	58,085	42.89	
Majority		13,694	10.11	
Turnout		135,442	88.50	+2.52
TDP gain from INC		Swing		

=== 2009 ===
2009 Andhra Pradesh Legislative Assembly election: Pedana
Party	Candidate	Votes	%	±%
INC	Jogi Ramesh	44,480	35.17	
TDP	Kagitha Venkata Rao	43,045	34.22	
PRP	Myla Veeraju	29,172	23.06	
Majority		1,192	0.95	
Turnout		126,484	85.98	
INC win (new seat)				

== See also ==
- List of constituencies of the Andhra Pradesh Legislative Assembly
