= Nuzvid Assembly constituency =

Constituency of the Andhra Pradesh Legislative Assembly, India

Coordinates: 16.78°N 80.85°E

Nuzvid
- Constituency No. 70 for the Andhra Pradesh Legislative Assembly
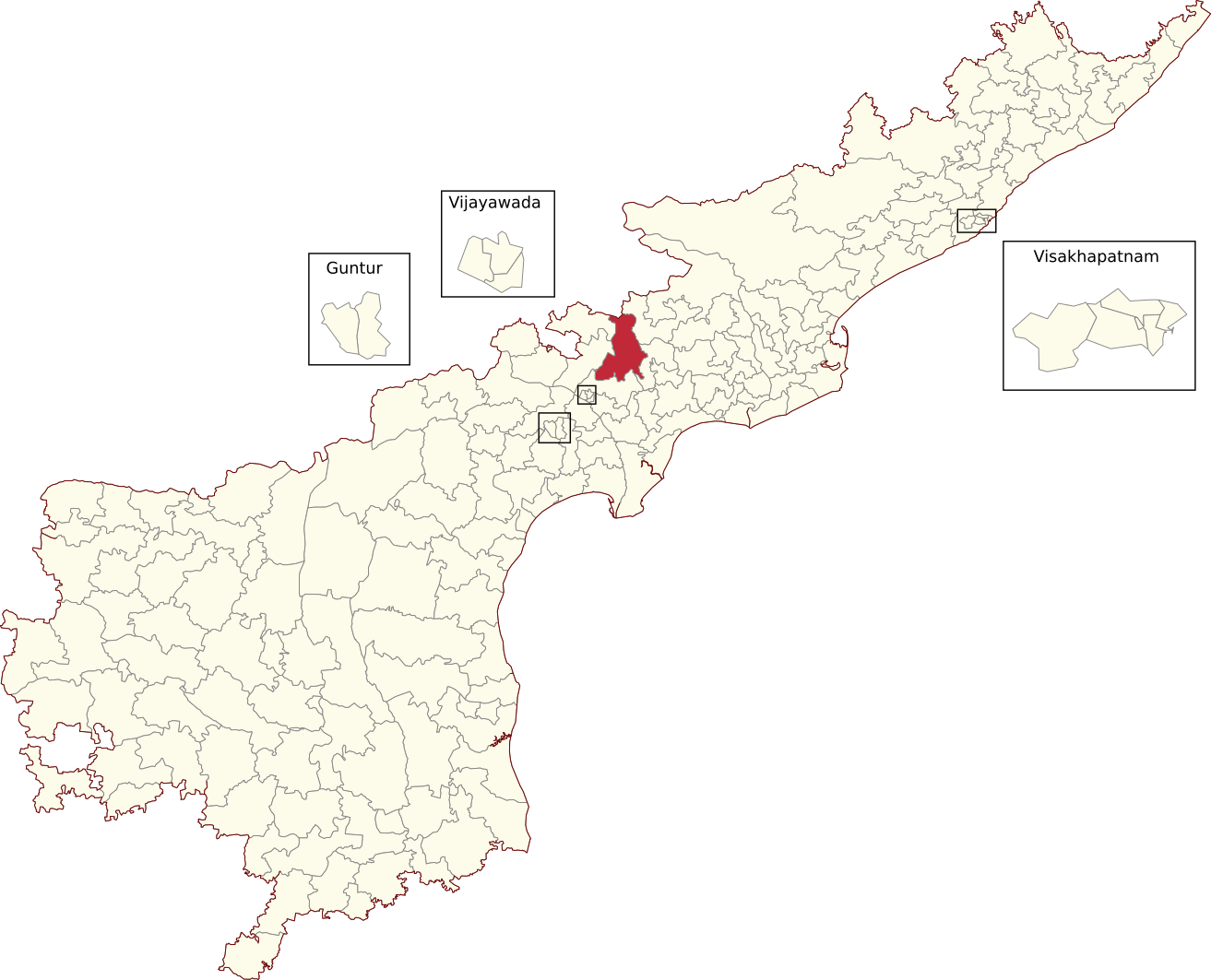
- Location of Nuzvid Assembly constituency within Andhra Pradesh

Constituency details
- Country: India
- Region: South India
- State: Andhra Pradesh
- District: Eluru
- Lok Sabha constituency: Eluru
- Established: 1951
- Total electors: 230,650
- Reservation: None

Member of Legislative Assembly
- 16th Andhra Pradesh Legislative Assembly
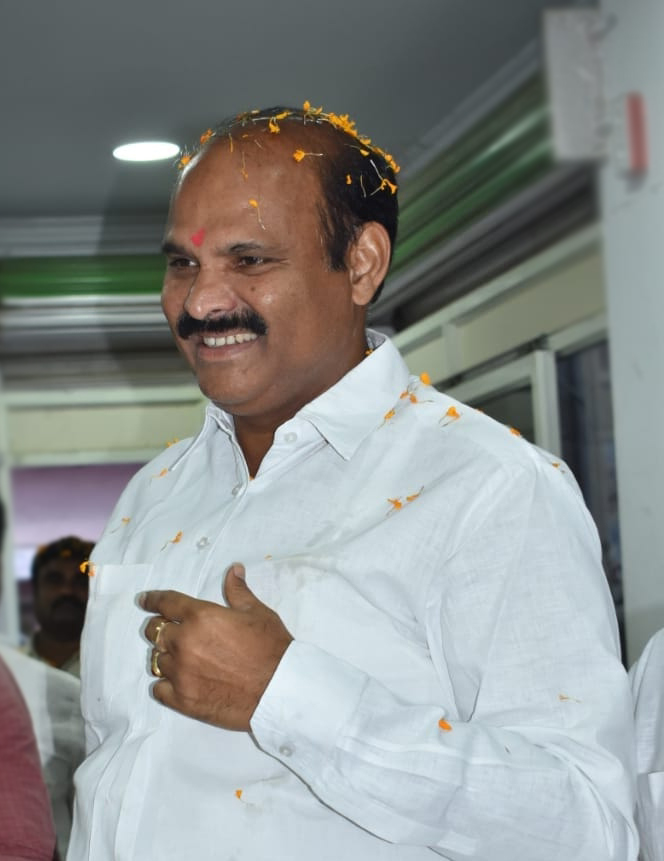
- Incumbent Kolusu Parthasarathy
- Party: TDP
- Alliance: NDA
- Elected year: 2024

Nuzvid Assembly constituency is a constituency in Eluru district of Andhra Pradesh that elects representatives to the Andhra Pradesh Legislative Assembly in India. It is one of the seven assembly segments of Eluru Lok Sabha constituency.

Kolusu Parthasarathy is the current MLA of the constituency, having won the 2024 Andhra Pradesh Legislative Assembly election from Telugu Desam Party. As of 2019, there are a total of 230,650 electors in the constituency. The constituency was established in 1951, as per the Delimitation Orders (1951).

== Mandals ==
The four mandals that form the assembly constituency are:

Mandal
Agiripalli
Chatrai
Musunuru
Nuzvid

== Members of the Legislative Assembly ==
Year	Member	Political party
1952	Meka Rangaiah Appa Rao	Indian National Congress
1955	Meka Rangaiah Appa Rao	Indian National Congress
1962	Meka Rangaiah Appa Rao	Indian National Congress
1967	Meka Rangaiah Appa Rao	Indian National Congress
1972	Meka Rangaiah Appa Rao	Indian National Congress
1978	Paladugu Venkata Rao	Indian National Congress (I)
1983	Kotagiri Hanumantha Rao	Independent
1985	Kotagiri Hanumantha Rao	Telugu Desam Party
1989	Paladugu Venkata Rao	Indian National Congress
1994	Kotagiri Hanumantha Rao	Telugu Desam Party
1999	Kotagiri Hanumantha Rao	Telugu Desam Party
2004	Meka Venkata Pratap Apparao	Indian National Congress
2009	Chinnam Rama Kotaiah	Telugu Desam Party
2014	Meka Venkata Pratap Apparao	YSR Congress Party
2019	Meka Venkata Pratap Apparao	YSR Congress Party
2024	Kolusu Parthasarathy	Telugu Desam Party

== Election results ==
=== 2024 ===
2024 Andhra Pradesh Legislative Assembly election: Nuzvid
Party	Candidate	Votes	%	±%
TDP	Kolusu Parthasarathy	108,229	51.12	
YSRCP	Meka Venkata Pratap Apparao	95,851	45.27	
INC	Krishna Mareedu	2,405	1.14	
NOTA	None of the above	2,771	1.31	
Majority		12,378	5.85	
Turnout		2,11,717		
TDP gain from YSRCP		Swing		

=== 2019 ===
2019 Andhra Pradesh Legislative Assembly election: Nuzvid
Party	Candidate	Votes	%	±%
YSRCP	Meka Venkata Pratap Apparao	101,950	50.84%	
TDP	Muddaraboina Venkateswara Rao	85,740	42.75%	
JSP	Vikunta Baskara Rao Basava	5,464		
Majority		16,210		
Turnout		188,586	87.84%	
YSRCP hold		Swing		

=== 2014 ===
2014 Andhra Pradesh Legislative Assembly election: Nuzvid
Party	Candidate	Votes	%	±%
YSRCP	Meka Venkata Pratap Apparao	95,565	50.67	
TDP	Muddaraboina Venkateswara Rao	84500	45.16	
Majority		10,397	5.51	
Turnout		188,586	87.85	−0.80
YSRCP gain from TDP		Swing		

=== 2009 ===
2009 Andhra Pradesh Legislative Assembly election: Nuzvid
Party	Candidate	Votes	%	±%
TDP	Chinnam Rama Kotaiah	70,206	41.32	−1.08
INC	Meka Venkata Pratap Apparao	65,063	38.30	−17.34
PRP	Muttamsetti Vijaya Nirmala	24,786	14.59	
Majority		5,143	3.02	
Turnout		169,896	88.65	+10.75
TDP gain from INC		Swing		

=== 2004 ===
2004 Andhra Pradesh Legislative Assembly election: Nuzvid
Party	Candidate	Votes	%	±%
INC	Meka Venkata Pratap Apparao	80,706	55.64	+21.77
TDP	Hanumantha Rao Kotagiri	61,498	42.40	+7.53
Majority		19,208	13.24	
Turnout		145,050	77.90	+3.90
INC gain from TDP		Swing		

=== 1952 ===
1952 Madras State Legislative Assembly election: Nuzvid
Party	Candidate	Votes	%	±%
INC	Meka Rangaiah Appa Rao	30,671	55.49%	55.49%
Independent	P. V. Raghavayya	24,607	44.51%	
Margin of victory		6,064	10.97%	
Turnout		55,278	78.98%	
Registered electors		69,991		
INC win (new seat)				

== See also ==
- List of constituencies of the Andhra Pradesh Legislative Assembly
