= Kagitha Venkata Rao =

Indian politician

Kagitha Venkat Rao (1951 – 30 April 2021) was an Indian politician from Andhra Pradesh. He was a former four time member of the Andhra Pradesh Legislative Assembly from Krishna district representing the Telugu Desam Party. He won from erstwhile Malleswaram Assembly constituency in 1985, 1994 and 1999, and became a four time MLA in 2014 from Pedana Assembly constituency.

== Early life ==
Rao was from Nageswararao Peta village, Bantumalli mandal, Krishna district, Andhra Pradesh. He is the son of Subba Rao. His son Kagitha Krishna Prasad later became an MLA from Pedana in 2024. He studied till Class 10 at ZP High School, Pedana, and passed PUC in 1969 from Hindu College, Machilipatnam.

== Career ==
Rao won the Pedana Assembly constituency in the 2014 Andhra Pradesh Legislative Assembly election representing the Telugu Desam Party. He polled 71,779 votes and defeated his nearest rival, Buragadda Veda Vyas of the YSR Congress Party, by a margin of 13,694 votes. He first became an MLA from the erstwhile Malleswaram constituency in 1985. Later, he won the 1994 Andhra Pradesh Legislative Assembly election where he garnered 50,791 votes and defeated his rival Buragadda Veda Vyas of the Congress by a margin of 8.111 votes. He retained the Malleswaram seat for the third time in the 1999 Andhra Pradesh Legislative Assembly election, also on TDP ticket. In 1999, he polled 49,310 and beat his closest opponent, Buragadda Veda Vyas of the Indian National Congress, by a margin of 669 votes.

He also served as the chairperson of the Tirupati Thirumala Devasthanam Trust.

=== Death ===
Rao died of post operation complications at a private hospital in Vijayawada, after a bypass surgery on 30 April 2021.
