= Bode Prasad =

Indian politician

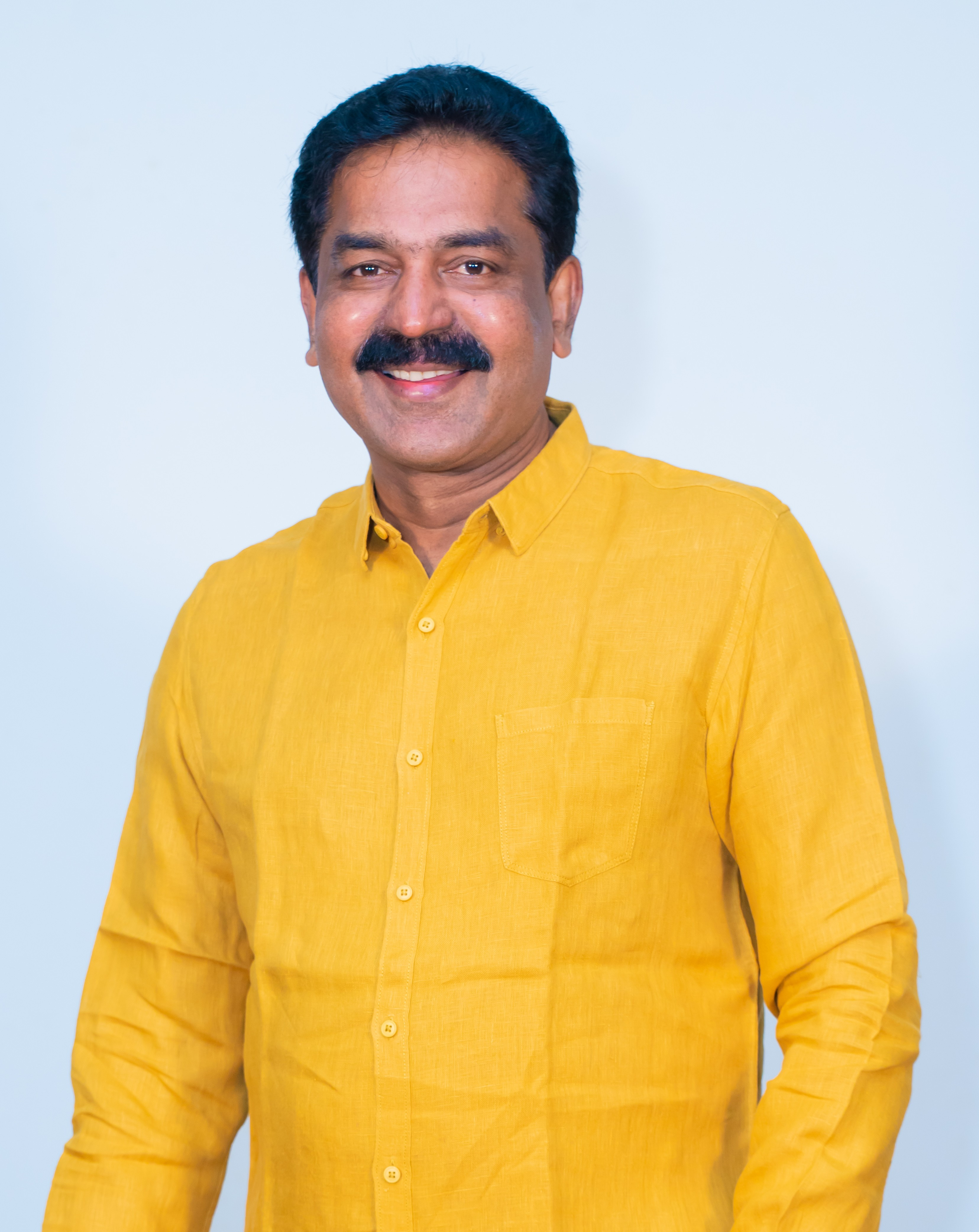

Member of Andhra Pradesh Legislative Assembly
- Incumbent
- Assumed office 4 June 2024
- Preceded by: Kolusu Parthasarathy
- Constituency: Penamaluru
- In office 2014–2019
- Preceded by: Kolusu Parthasarathy
- Succeeded by: Kolusu Parthasarathy
- Constituency: Penamaluru

Personal details
- Born: 18 June 1967 (age 59) Bezawada, Andhra Pradesh, India
- Party: Telugu Desam Party
- Spouse: Bode Hema
- Children: Vaishnavi; Venkatram
- Occupation: Politician; Businessman
- Website: http://www.bodeprasad.com

Bode Prasad is an Indian politician and member of the Andhra Pradesh Legislative Assembly for Penamaluru Assembly constituency. He is appointed TDP Machilipatnam Lok Sabha constituency General Secretary.

== Biography ==
=== Personal life ===
Bode is married to Hema.

=== Political ===
In the 2014 assembly election, Bode contested from Penamaluru constituency and won with a majority of 31,448 votes.

For nearly a decade, Bode has earnestly devoted himself to the Telugu Desam Party, He engaged in numerous constructive initiatives focused on alleviating poverty within specific demographics, providing assistance to those in need, and raising awareness about social, political, economic, and legal matters. He also played an active role in rescue and rehabilitation efforts.

Bode won the 2024 Indian general election from Penamaluru constituency representing Telugu Desam Party. He defeated Jogi Ramesh of YSR Congress Party by a margin of 59,915 votes.

== Positions held ==
- Machilipatnam Lok Sabha constituency General Secretary - Telugu Desam Party

Legislative Assembly

- 2014 : Elected from Penamaluru Assembly constituency
- 2024 : Elected from Penamaluru Assembly constituency

== Election statistics ==
Year	Contested For	Party	Constituency	Opponent	Votes	Majority	Result
2014	MLA	TDP	Penamaluru	Kukkala Vidyasagar (YSRCP)	1,02,330 - 70,882	31,448	Won
2024	MLA	TDP	Penamaluru	Jogi Ramesh (YSRCP)	1,44,912 - 84,997	59,915	Won
