= Arogyavaram =

- Locality
- Interactive map of Arogyavaram
- Location within Andhra Pradesh
- Coordinates: 13.6021362°N 78.5328225°E
- Country: India
- State: Andhra Pradesh
- District: Annamayya district
- Mandal: Madanapalle
- Time zone: UTC+05:30 (IST)
- Pincode: 517326

Arogyavaram is a locality in Madanapalle town in the district of Annamayya district, Andhra Pradesh, India. It is popularly known as the place for TB hospital which was started in 1912.

== Climate ==
Climate data for Arogyavaram (1991–2020, extremes 1946–2010)
Month	Jan	Feb	Mar	Apr	May	Jun	Jul	Aug	Sep	Oct	Nov	Dec	Year
Record high °C (°F)	34.0 (93.2)	37.1 (98.8)	39.0 (102.2)	40.4 (104.7)	40.5 (104.9)	40.6 (105.1)	37.3 (99.1)	35.0 (95.0)	36.8 (98.2)	34.0 (93.2)	32.6 (90.7)	31.8 (89.2)	40.6 (105.1)
Mean daily maximum °C (°F)	28.7 (83.7)	31.5 (88.7)	34.8 (94.6)	36.5 (97.7)	36.2 (97.2)	32.8 (91.0)	31.3 (88.3)	30.5 (86.9)	30.5 (86.9)	29.4 (84.9)	27.6 (81.7)	26.6 (79.9)	31.4 (88.5)
Mean daily minimum °C (°F)	14.8 (58.6)	16.5 (61.7)	19.4 (66.9)	22.1 (71.8)	23.6 (74.5)	22.4 (72.3)	21.8 (71.2)	21.6 (70.9)	21.2 (70.2)	19.9 (67.8)	17.9 (64.2)	15.6 (60.1)	19.8 (67.6)
Record low °C (°F)	8.0 (46.4)	10.0 (50.0)	10.0 (50.0)	14.0 (57.2)	15.6 (60.1)	17.0 (62.6)	16.7 (62.1)	16.5 (61.7)	16.0 (60.8)	13.5 (56.3)	7.0 (44.6)	8.0 (46.4)	7.0 (44.6)
Average rainfall mm (inches)	3.0 (0.12)	8.5 (0.33)	12.0 (0.47)	23.8 (0.94)	68.6 (2.70)	88.5 (3.48)	85.5 (3.37)	117.6 (4.63)	124 (4.9)	168.1 (6.62)	83.3 (3.28)	33.6 (1.32)	816.6 (32.15)
Average rainy days	0.2	0.5	0.9	1.8	4.3	5.1	5.8	5.9	7.0	8.3	5.5	2.4	47.7
Average relative humidity (%) (at 17:30 IST)	48	39	31	35	40	51	56	57	60	66	68	62	51
Source: India Meteorological Department

== Health ==
The town is known for its sanatorium (now a general hospital), established in 1912, for the treatment of tuberculosis.
