= Peddamandyam =

- Village
- Interactive map of Peddamandyam
- Location in Andhra Pradesh, India
- Coordinates: 13°51′15″N 78°32′52″E
- Country: India
- State: Andhra Pradesh
- District: Annamayya
- Mandal: Peddamandyam
- Talukas: Thamballa Palle

Languages
  - Official: Telugu
- Time zone: UTC+5:30 (IST)

Peddamandyam is a village in Annamayya district of the Indian state of Andhra Pradesh. It is the mandal headquarters of Peddamandyam mandal.

== Demographics ==
Total (2011). 34,502 - males. 17,278 - females 17,224 literacy (2011) - Total 50.12% - males. 63.47% - females. 36.77%

== Villages in the mandal ==
- Kalicherla
