= Meka Venkata Pratap Apparao =

Indian politician

Member of Legislative Assembly, Andhra Pradesh
- In office 2014–2024
- Preceded by: Chinnam Rama Kotaiah
- Succeeded by: Kolusu Parthasarathy
- Constituency: Nuzvid
- In office 2004–2009
- Preceded by: Kotagiri Hanumantha Rao
- Succeeded by: Chinnam Rama Kotaiah
- Constituency: Nuzvid

Personal details
- Born: October 11, 1950 (age 75) Nuzvid, Krishna district, Andhra Pradesh, India
- Party: YSR Congress Party
- Other political affiliations: Indian National Congress
- Spouse: Sujatha Devi
- Relatives: Meka Rangaiah Appa Rao (grandfather)
- Education: B.Com, DAR College, Nuzvid
- Occupation: Politician, Businessperson

Meka Venkata Pratap Apparao (born 11 October 1950) is an Indian politician from Andhra Pradesh. He is a three-time MLA from Nuzvid Assembly constituency in Krishna district. He won for the third time in 2019. He is a member of the YSR Congress Party.

== Early life and education ==
Pratap is from Nuzvid in Krishna district of Andhra Pradesh. He is the son of Meka Venkata Swetha Chalapathi Venu Gopala Apparao of Meka family, which has ruled the Nuzvid seat for over half a century. He is the grandson of Meka Rangaiah Apparao, former vice chancellor of Andhra University. He is a businessman. He did his graduation in commerce from DAR College, Nuzvid in 1971. He married Sujatha Devi.

== Career ==
Pratap was elected as the Member of Legislative Assembly from Nuzvid for the first time in 2004 from the Indian National Congress. He joined YSR Congress Party (YSRCP) in 2014 and contested again from the Nuzvid and won the 2014 Andhra Pradesh Legislative Assembly election defeating Muddaraboina Venkateswara Rao by a margin of 10,397 votes. He was re-elected for the third time from YSRCP, defeating Rao again by a margin of 16,210 votes in the 2019 Andhra Pradesh Legislative Assembly election.
