= Meka Rangaiah Appa Rao =

Indian politician, academic (1915–2003)

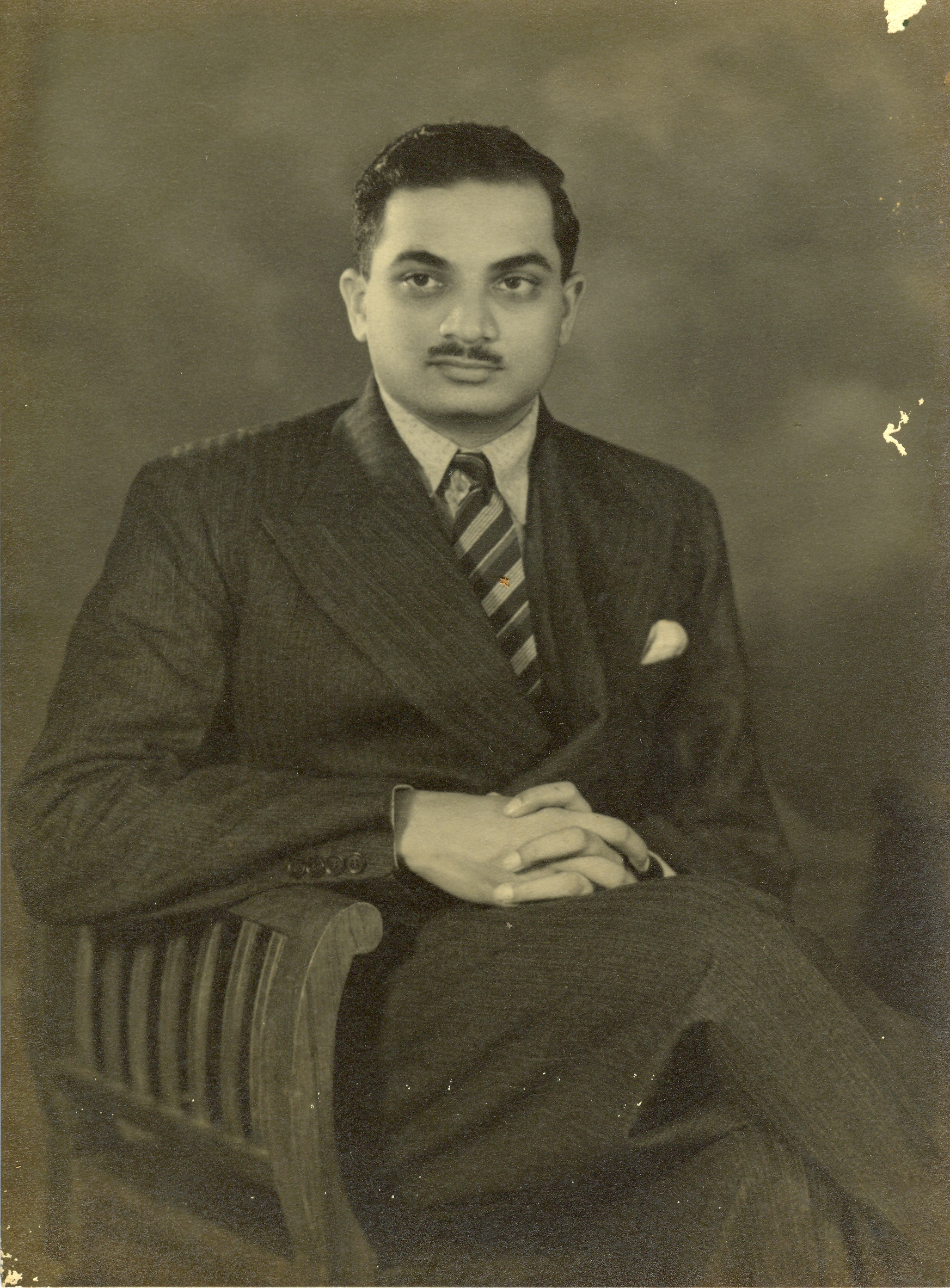

Member of Parliament, Rajya Sabha
- In office 20 March 1981 - 2 April 1982
- Constituency: Andhra Pradesh

Member of Legislative Assembly Andhra Pradesh
- In office 1956 - 1978
- Preceded by: Andhra Pradesh Assembly Created
- Succeeded by: Paladugu Venkata Rao
- Constituency: Nuzvid

Member of Legislative Assembly Andhra state
- In office 1953 - 1956
- Preceded by: Andhra State Assembly Created
- Succeeded by: Andhra Pradesh Assembly Created
- Constituency: Nuzvid

Member of Legislative Assembly Madras State
- In office 1952 - 1953
- Preceded by: First Election
- Succeeded by: Andhra State Assembly Created
- Constituency: Nuzvid

Personal details
- Born: 21 March 1915 Nuzvid, Krishna district
- Died: 31 January 2003 (aged 87)
- Party: Indian National Congress
- Spouse(s): Princess Sita Devi of Pithapuram (m. 1935 - div. 1943)
- Relatives: Meka Venkata Pratap Apparao (grandson)

Meka Rangaiah Appa Rao shortly M. R. Appa Rao (21 March 1915 – 31 January 2003) was Vice Chancellor of Andhra University, Member of Andhra Pradesh Legislative Assembly, Minister in Government of Andhra Pradesh, Member of Rajya Sabha.

== Early life ==
He was the son of Meka Venkatadri Appa Rao, a Zamindar (landlord), and was born in a Velama family in Nuzvid, Krishna district. His father was the Raja of Vuyyur, Nuzvid and an Indian freedom activist having held thousands of acres of land under his control. He married Sita Devi, Princess of Pithapuram. He was sometimes referred to as the Zamindar of Vuyyuru, as he stayed in the Vuyyuru estates in Nuzvid Zamindari.

== Career ==
=== Academic ===
Rao was Chairman of Andhra Mahasabha in 1943 and translated and published the "Gita Govinda" in Telugu language.

He held the position of Vice Chancellor of Andhra University for two terms between 13 December 1974 and 12 December 1980.

He has written Prajaswamika Socialism Pranalikalu (1980) and Bharateeya Chitrakala (1987) in Telugu language and Land Development Banks in Andhra Pradesh (1981) and Round the World (1981) in English.

=== Political ===
Rao has entered politics and was elected to the Madras Legislative Assembly in 1952 Madras State legislative assembly election from Nuzvid constituency. He was elected to the Andhra Pradesh Legislative Assembly from Nuzvid constituency in 1955 (then Andhra State), 1962, 1967 and 1972 as a member of Indian National Congress. He held the portfolio of Minister of Cultural Affairs in the Government of Andhra Pradesh.

He was member of Rajya Sabha in Indian Parliament from 20 March 1981 to 2 April 1982.

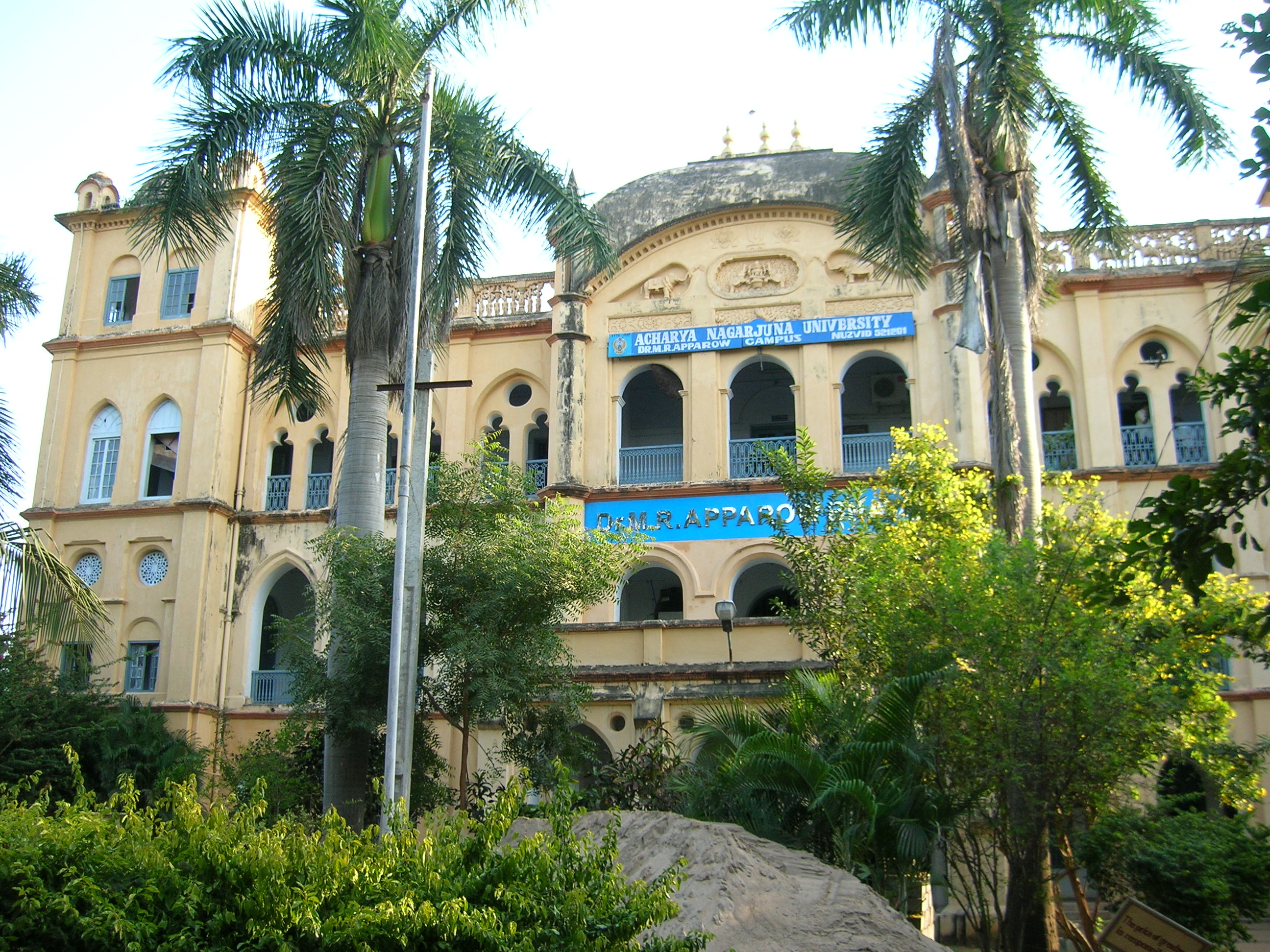

== Death and honours ==
He died on 31 January 2003.

The University college of Acharya Nagarjuna University at Nuzvid was named after him as Dr. M. R. Appa Row Campus.

== Awards ==
He was recipient of "Kala Prapoorna" from Andhra University in 1953.
