= Palamaner Kuppam Madanapalle Urban Development Authority =

- పలమనేరు కుప్పం మదనపల్లి నగర అభివృద్ధి సంస్థ

Agency overview
- Formed: 12 February 2019
- Type: Urban Planning Agency
- Jurisdiction: Government of Andhra Pradesh in Annamayya&Chittoor districts
- Headquarters: Madanapalle, Andhra Pradesh

The Palamaner Kuppam Madanapalle Urban Development Authority (PKM-UDA) is an urban planning agency in Chittoor district and Annamayya districts of the Indian state of Andhra Pradesh. It was constituted on 12 February 2019, under Andhra Pradesh Metropolitan Region and Urban Development Authorities Act, 2016 with the headquarters located at Madanapalle.

== Jurisdiction ==
The jurisdictional area of PKMUDA is spread over an area of 2,435.50 km^{2} (940.35 sq mi) and has a population of 10.17 lakhs. It covers 376 villages in 12 mandals of Annamayya and Chittoor districts. The below table lists the urban areas of PKMUDA.

Jurisdiction
Settlement Type	Name	Total
Municipalities	Palamaner, Kuppam, Madanapalle	3
