= Mudunuri Prasada Raju =

Indian politician

Mudunuri Naga Raja Vara Prasada Raju (born 1975) is an Indian politician from Andhra Pradesh. He is an MLA of YSR Congress Party from Narasapuram Assembly Constituency in West Godavari District. He is nominated by YSRCP to contest the Narasapuram Constituency again for the 2024 Assembly Election.

== Early life and education ==
Raju is born in Madhavaya Palem to Satyanarayana Raj. He completed his schooling from Lenin Municipal High School, Narasapuram in 1988. Later, he did his intermediate, the pre-university course, from Sri Y. N. College, Narsapuram, West Godavari District. His daughter Sindhu is a doctor. Chief Minister Y. S. Jagan Mohan Reddy attended his daughter's wedding.

== Career ==
Raju started his political journey with Indian National Congress party. He won the 2009 Andhra Pradesh Legislative Assembly Election representing Congress from Narasapuram Assembly Constituency defeating Kothapalli Subbarayudu of Jana Sena Party by 17,325 votes. Later, he joined YSR Congress Party. In 2019 he won the Narasapuram seat representing YSRCP defeating Bommidi Nayaker of Jana Sena Party by a margin of 6,436 votes. In 2014, he lost from Achanta Assembly constituency to Pithani Sathyanarayana of Telugu Desam Party. He also served as Government Whip.
