= Kurabalakota =

- Village
- Interactive map of Kurabalakota
- Location in Andhra Pradesh, India
- Coordinates: 13.6500°N 78.4833°E
- Country: India
- State: Andhra Pradesh
- District: Annamayya
- Mandal: Kurabalakota
- Elevation: 764 m (2,507 ft)

Languages
  - Official: Telugu
- Time zone: UTC+5:30 (IST)
- PIN: 517350
- Vehicle registration: AP

Kurabalakota is a census town in Annamayya district of the Indian state of Andhra Pradesh. It is a mandal headquarters of Thamballapalle Constituency in Madanapalle Revenue division

== Geography ==
Kurabalakota is located at 13.6500°N 78.4833°E. It has an average elevation of 764 meters (2211 feet). Latitude 13.6522 Longitude 78.4817 Lat (DMS) 13° 39' 8N Long (DMS) 78° 28' 54E

== Transport ==
It is near Madanapalle & Horsley Hills. The National Highway 340, which connects Hyderabad–Tokapalle road, bypasses the village.

Sri Santhana Venugopala Swamy Temple, Thettu is located within 7 km.
