= Andhra Pradesh special status protests =

2017 political protests in India

AP Protests for Special Status
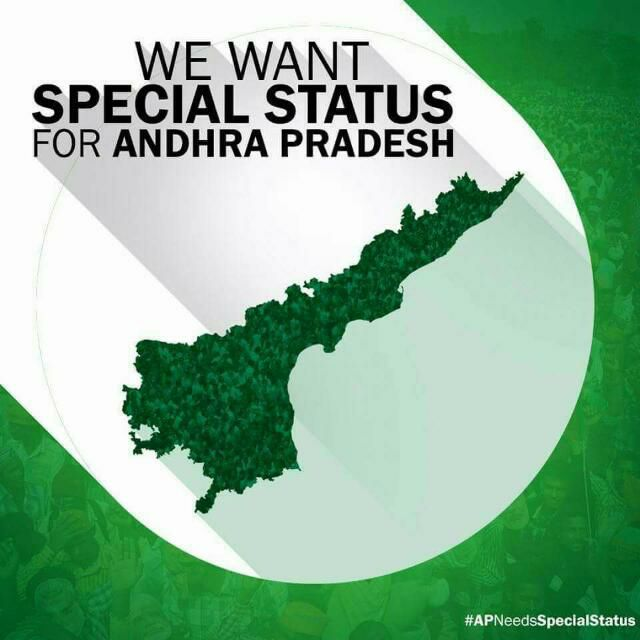
- One of the posters widely circulated in social media to gather people for protest
- Date: 26 January 2017 – present
- Location: Andhra Pradesh, India
- Caused by: Not fulfilling the Promise made during AP State Bifurcation
- Goals: Special Category Status for AP
- Methods: Picketing, Sloganeering, Human chain, Silent protest, Demonstration, Internet activism
- Result: Yet to be Announced

Number
| > 5000 | |

On 26 January 2017, protests started throughout Andhra Pradesh, with a demand that 'Special Category Status' (SCS) be applied to the state, which was promised by the Congress Government during the state bifurcation.

Five YSR Congress Party MPs submitted their resignations from Parliament on the 6th of April to protest against the Central government's refusal to accord Special Category Status to Andhra Pradesh. Their resignations were accepted on 22 June 2018.

== Overview ==
=== Demand ===
Special Category Status for Andhra Pradesh as per the promise made by Lawmakers in the parliament during State Bifurcation(to divide into two parts).

=== Basis ===
Following the bifurcation of the united state of Andhra Pradesh the residual state lost a large part of its revenue due to Hyderabad remaining as the capital of Telangana. In a debate in the Rajya Sabha on the Andhra Pradesh Reorganisation Act on 20 February 2014, then Prime Minister Manmohan Singh had said that SCS would be "extended to the successor State of Andhra Pradesh for a period of five years." This oral submission by the then PM has been the basis for A.P.'s claim to the status.

== Time Line ==
Protests Demanding Special Category Status for Andhra Pradesh was inspired by the 2017 pro-jallikattu protests in the neighboring state of Tamil Nadu.

Chief Minister of Andhra Pradesh spoke against the protests, and said that there was no need for it as the state can be benefitted with Special Package instead of Special Category.

DGP of Andhra Pradesh, N Sambasiva Rao told reporters that no permission was granted for protests at RK Beach on 26 Jan.

Hours before the proposed protest on 26 January for demanding Special Status Category to Andhra Pradesh, AP police had clamped down on the gathering of five more persons by issuing prohibitory orders under Section 144 in Vizag, Tirupati, and other proposed protest Locations.

Despite prohibitory orders scores of youth tried to reach RK beach in Vizag. Police quickly detained More than a 100 people.

Jana Sena Party chief Pawan Kalyan, YSRCP Leader Jagan Mohan Reddy, and others expressed their distress on police action over a proposed peaceful protests.

== Supporters ==
The protests that gathered momentum on social media among students and youth just like Jallikattu Protests soon saw supporters from all quarters.

== Protests ==
On 26 January 2017, activists staged silent protests in Visakhapatnam, Vijayawada, Guntur, Tirupati, Nellore, Anantapur, Kakinada, Rajamundry and other places across the state. Mainly youths and students participated in the protests. Prior to the day of protest, the AP Government has issued prohibitory orders. Police arrested a large number of protesters across the state for violating the order.
