= Peddathippasamudram =

Peddathippasamudram P T M
- Village
- Interactive map of Peddathippasamudram
- Location in Andhra Pradesh, India
- Coordinates: 13.7167°N 78.2000°E
- Country: India
- State: Andhra Pradesh
- District: Annamayya
- Mandal: Peddathippasamudram
- Established: School on 1960

Languages
  - Official: Telugu
- Time zone: UTC+5:30 (IST)
- Vehicle registration: AP

Peddathippasamudram (P.T.M.) is a village in Annamayya district of the Indian state of Andhra Pradesh. It is the mandal headquarters of Peddathippasamudram mandal.
