= Jogi Ramesh =

Indian politician

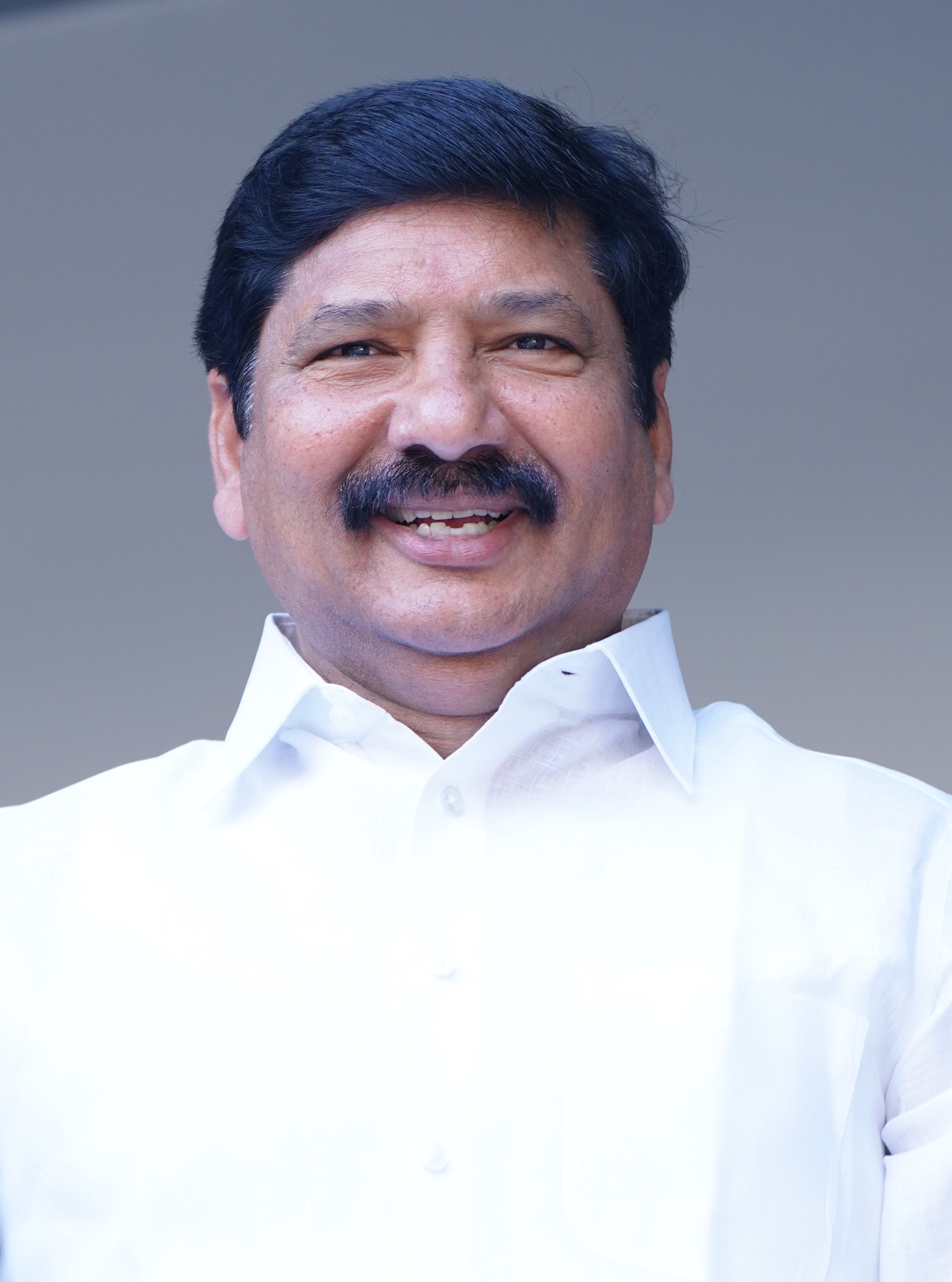

Minister of Housing Government of Andhra Pradesh
- In office 11 April 2022 – 4 June 2024
- Governor: Biswabhusan Harichandan; S. Abdul Nazeer
- Chief Minister: Y. S. Jagan Mohan Reddy
- Preceded by: Cherukuvada Sri Ranganadha Raju

Member of Legislative Assembly Andhra Pradesh
- In office 2019–2024
- Preceded by: Kagitha Venkata Rao
- Succeeded by: Kagitha Krishna Prasad
- Constituency: Pedana
- In office 2009–2014
- Preceded by: Constituency Established
- Succeeded by: Kagitha Venkata Rao
- Constituency: Pedana

Personal details
- Born: 1970 (age 55–56)
- Party: YSR Congress Party (since 2013)
- Other political affiliations: Indian National Congress (until 2012)
- Children: Rajeev, Rohit Kumar, Reshma Priyanka
- Parents: Jogi Mohan Rao (father); Pushpavathi (mother)
- Occupation: Politician

Jogi Ramesh is an Indian politician from the state of Andhra Pradesh. He is a former Member of the Legislative Assembly (MLA). He represented Pedana Constituency from 2019 to 2024 and on 11 April 2022 sworn in as the Minister in the Andhra Pradesh cabinet.

== Early life ==
Jogi Ramesh was born in 1970 in Ibrahimpatnam, Krishna district (now NTR district) to Jogi Mohan Rao and Pushpavati. He has completed BSc from National College, Acharya Nagarjuna University in 1989. Jogi Ramesh is a member of the Goud but converted to Christianity.

== Political career ==
Jogi Ramesh was active in politics in the Youth Congress wing from college days. He served as the President of Krishna district Youth Congress, Railway Board member, Satavahana RTC Regional Zonal Chairman. Jogi Ramesh contested as a Congress candidate from Pedana in 2009 Andhra Pradesh Assembly elections and won against the Telugu Desam Party candidate Kagitha Venkat Rao for the first time as an MLA with a majority of 1,192 votes. He later joined the YSR Congress Party in 2013, and served as the State Spokesperson for the Party. He contested 2014 Assembly Elections from Mylavaram from YSRCP and lost to Telugu Desam Party candidate Devineni Uma Maheswara Rao. In 2019 Assembly Elections he contested again from Pedana as YSRCP candidate and defeated TDP candidate Kagitha Krishna Prasad by a majority of 7,839 votes. Jogi Ramesh was inducted into Y.S. Jagan Mohan Reddy's Cabinet on 11 April 2022.

Ramesh contested 2024 Indian general election from Penamaluru Assembly constituency representing YSR Congress Party. He was defeated by Bode Prasad with a margin of 59,915 votes.

In 2024, Ramesh was questioned by the police as part of the investigation into the 2021 attack on N. Chandrababu Naidu's residence.

He was arrested in 2025 by Excise and Prohibition department at Ibrahimpatnam for his alleged involvement in the spurious liquor case.
