= Mulakalacheruvu =

- town
- Interactive map of Mulakalacheruvu
- Location in Andhra Pradesh, India
- Coordinates: 13°50′27″N 78°18′20″E
- Country: India
- State: Andhra Pradesh
- District: Annamayya
- Mandal: Mulakalacheruvu

Languages
  - Official: Telugu
- Time zone: UTC+5:30 (IST)
- PIN: 517390
- Telephone code: +91–8582 (code)
- Vehicle registration: AP

Mulakalacheruvu is a town in Annamayya district of the Indian state of Andhra Pradesh. It is the mandal headquarters of Mulakalacheruvu mandal.
