= Thamballapalle =

- village
- Interactive map of Thamballapalle
- Location in Andhra Pradesh, India
- Coordinates: 13°53′58″N 78°25′13″E
- Country: India
- State: Andhra Pradesh
- District: Annamayya
- Talukas: Thamballapalle

Population (2011)
  - Total: 8,416

Languages
  - Official: Telugu
- Time zone: UTC+5:30 (IST)
- Vehicle registration: AP

Thamballapalle is a village and Mandal headquarters in Annamayya district of the Indian state of Andhra Pradesh. Horsey Hills is a famous hill station which is located in this mandal. The Famous Indian Boarding School "Rishi Valley School" located in this mandal. Famous Hindu Shiva temples like "Mallayya Konda" is located in Thamballapalle. During shiva Rathri lakh's of devotees visit this temple.

Thamballapalle Constituency is a constituency of Andhra Pradesh Legislative Assembly, India. It is one of the constituencies in Annamayya district. It has great political history, which constitutes many significant leaders involve.

== History ==
As the Tambalas, the pujaris of Lord Mallikarjuna Swamy were residing here in the beginning, this village goes by the name Tamballapalle. Lord Mallikharjuna Swamy temple (on the Mallayyakonda alias Indra Keeladri Parvatham) with His image in the form of Sivalingam, Lord Kodanda Rama Swamy temple and Goddess Gangamma's temple are the places of worship in this place. Lord Mallikharjuna Swamy Sivarathrostavam is celebrated for ten days from Magha Bahula Triodasi (January-February). The next day after Sivaratri childless women worship the Lord for children. After begetting children they fulfill their vows by performing the tonsure of the child - puttu vendrukalu at the temple and 'chevulu kuttuta' (ear boring). Fasting, jaagaram and feasts are observed during Sivaratri and on all Mondays in Karthikam (October, November). This is being celebrated since the origin of the temple and is extended Mysore and Tamil Nadu states also. The villagers patronize the festival. Many devotees from distant parts of this State, Karnataka and Tamil Nadu states congregate. Only Hindus participate in this festival.

A cattle fair is held in an area of 10 acres. Taxes are collected. Many people take part in it.

== Demographics ==
As of 2011 Census of India, the Village had a population of 8,416 and 4,100 males, 4,316 females and 841 children, in the age group of 0–6 years. The average literacy rate stands at 67.16% with 5652 literates.
