= Kalicherla =

- Village
- Interactive map of Kalicherla
- Location in Andhra Pradesh, India
- Coordinates: 13°53′N 78°32′E
- Country: India
- State: Andhra Pradesh
- District: Annamayya

Languages
  - Official: Telugu Tamil kannada and Urdu
- Time zone: UTC+5:30 (IST)
- PIN: 517297
- Telephone code: 08571

Kalicherla is a village in Annamayya district of the Indian state of Andhra Pradesh. It is located in Peddamandyam mandal.
