= Madanapalle mandal =

- Mandal
- Interactive map of Madanapalle mandal
- Location in Andhra Pradesh, India
- Coordinates: 13.55°N 78.50°E
- Country: India
- State: Andhra Pradesh
- District: Annamayya district
- Headquarters: Madanapalle

Government
  - Body: Mandal Parishad

Area
  - Total: 240.47 km^{2} (92.85 sq mi)

Population (2011)
  - Total: 96,768
  - Density: 402.41/km^{2} (1,042.2/sq mi)

Languages
  - Official: Telugu
- Time zone: UTC+5:30 (IST)

Madanapalle mandal is one of the 25 mandals in Annamayya district of the Indian state of Andhra Pradesh. It is under the administration of Madanapalle revenue division and the headquarters are located at Madanapalle. The mandal is bounded by Kurabalakota, GurramKonda, Valmikipuram, Nimmanapalle, B. Kothakota, Punganur, Ramasamudram and the State of Karnataka.

== Towns and villages ==
As of 2011 census, the mandal has 23 villages.

The settlements in the mandal are listed below:

1. Basinikonda
2. Chinnathippasamudram
3. Kasiraopeta
4. Kollabylu
5. Kothavaripalle
6. Madanapalle Rural (part)
7. Malepadu
8. Molakaladinne
9. Penchupadu
10. Ponnetipalem (part)
11. Pothapalu
12. Theneegalavaripalle
13. Valasapalle
14. Vempalle

Note: M-Municipality

== See also ==
- List of mandals in Andhra Pradesh
