= Nimmanapalle =

- village
- Interactive map of Nimmanapalle
- Location in Andhra Pradesh, India
- Coordinates: 13.58919°N 78.67559°E
- Country: India
- State: Andhra Pradesh
- District: Annamayya

Languages
  - Official: Telugu & Urdu
- Time zone: UTC+5:30 (IST)
- PIN: 517280
- Vehicle registration: AP

Nimmanapalle is a village in Annamayya district of the Indian state of Andhra Pradesh. It is the mandal headquarters of Nimmanapalle mandal.
