= Ramasamudram =

- Village
- Interactive map of Ramasamudram
- Location in Andhra Pradesh, India
- Coordinates: 13.3667°N 78.4333°E
- Country: India
- State: Andhra Pradesh
- District: Annamayya
- Mandal: Ramasamudram
- Elevation: 796 m (2,612 ft)
- Demonym: 50000

Languages
  - Official: Telugu
- Time zone: UTC+5:30 (IST)
- PIN: 517417
- Vehicle registration: AP

Ramasamudram is a village in Annamayya district of the Indian state of Andhra Pradesh. It is the mandal headquarters of Ramasamudram mandal.

== Geography ==
Ramasamudram is located at 13.3667°N 78.4333°E. It has an average elevation of 787 metres (2,582 ft).
