= Madanapalle =

Madanapalle Maryada Ramanna Puram
- City
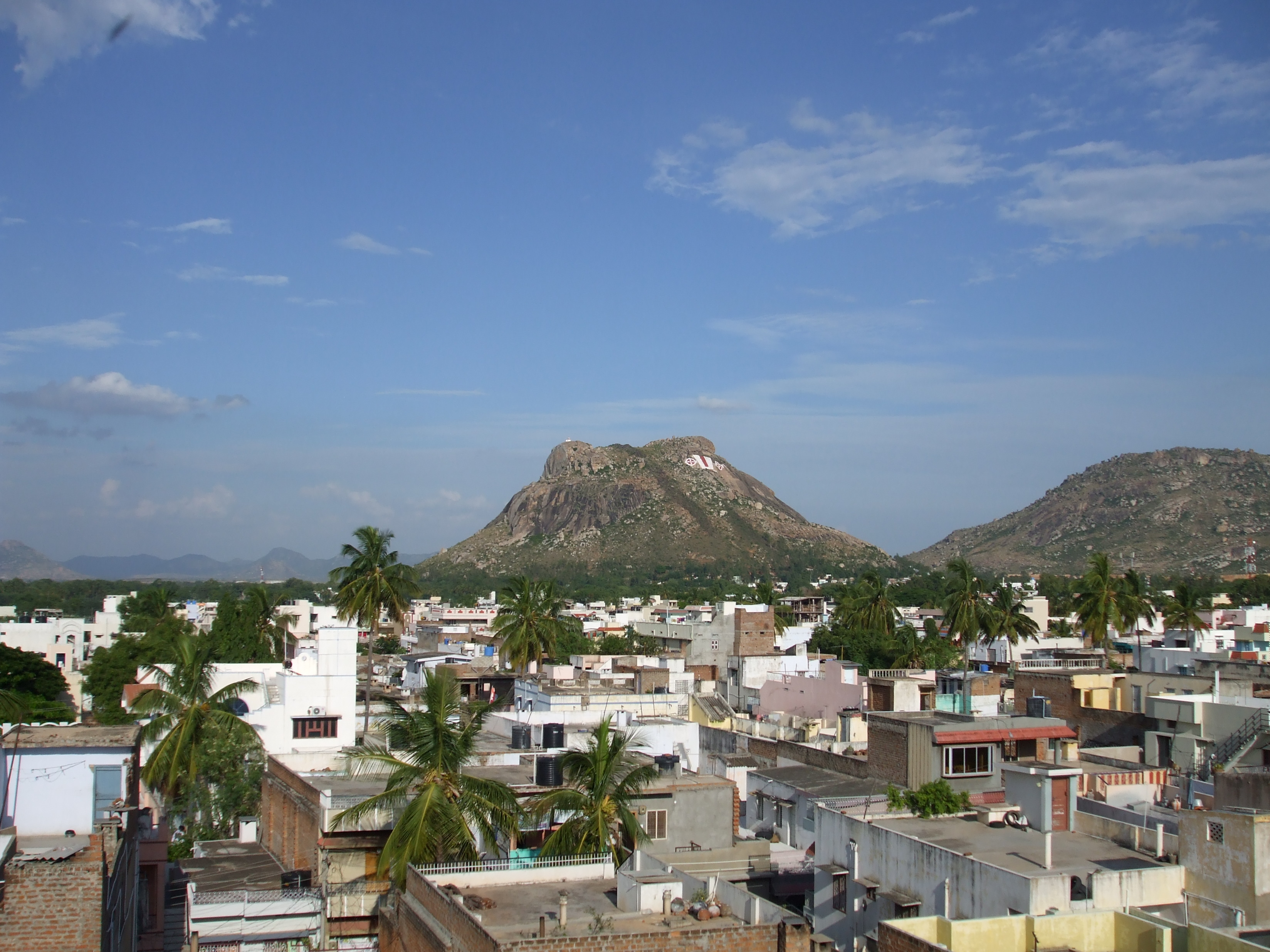
- Madanapalle city view
- Nicknames: Tomato Hub of Andhra Pradesh, Andhra ooty
- Location within Andhra Pradesh Location within India
- Coordinates: 13.55°N 78.50°E
- Country: India
- State: Andhra Pradesh
- District: Annamayya
- Established: 1618 AD
- Founder: Yalagiri Ahobila Naidu

Government
  - Type: Municipal Council
  - Body: Madanapalle Municipality, PKMUDA

Area
  - Total: 56.3 km^{2} (21.7 sq mi)
- Elevation: 695 m (2,280 ft)

Population (2011)
  - Total: 180,180
  - Density: 3,200/km^{2} (8,290/sq mi)

Languages
  - Official: Telugu
- Time zone: UTC+5:30 (IST)
- PIN: 517 325,517326,517319
- Telephone code: +91– 8571
- Vehicle registration: AP39, AP40
- Website: madanapalle.cdma.ap.gov.in/en

Madanapalle is a city and district headquarters of Annamayya district of the Indian state of Andhra Pradesh. Madanapalle is headquarters of Madanapalle Mandal, Madanapalle revenue division and PKM Urban Development Authority.

== History ==
Madanapalle was founded by Sri Yalagiri Ahobila Naidu in 1618 AD. Kammas were said to be the first inhabitants of the town.

During the early British administration, Sir Thomas Munro, the first Collector of Cuddapah, played a significant role in the development of the town. He constructed a small thatched house at the present-day location of the Collector's bungalow and visited Madanapalle every summer. Munro's connection with the town is well documented, as he facilitated British control in the region during the early 19th century. Madanapalle and its surrounding areas were formally integrated into the British administration when the region came under their rule in 1800.

In 1850, Madanapalle was developed as a subdivision under British India, with F.B. Manoly appointed as its first Sub-Collector. Over the years, the town faced several natural calamities, including floods, famines, and epidemics, which shaped its social and economic development.

Madanapalle is also linked to a significant moment in India's national history. In 1919, Rabindranath Tagore visited the town and stayed at the Besant Theosophical College, where he translated the Indian national anthem, Jana Gana Mana, from Bengali to English. Tagore also set it to western musical notations while in Madanapalle. Jana Gana Mana was originally written in 1911 and first sung at the Indian National Congress session in Calcutta on 27 December 1911.

== Geography ==
It is located at an average elevation of 695 m (2,280 ft) above mean sea level.

Madanapalle is located at 13.55°N 78.50°E.

Climate data for Madanapalle
Month	Jan	Feb	Mar	Apr	May	Jun	Jul	Aug	Sep	Oct	Nov	Dec	Year
Mean daily maximum °C (°F)	27.3 (81.1)	30.2 (86.4)	33.4 (92.1)	34.9 (94.8)	35 (95)	32.1 (89.8)	30.2 (86.4)	30.1 (86.2)	29.9 (85.8)	28.6 (83.5)	26.8 (80.2)	25.7 (78.3)	30.4 (86.6)
Mean daily minimum °C (°F)	15.5 (59.9)	16.8 (62.2)	19.4 (66.9)	22.2 (72.0)	23.6 (74.5)	22.8 (73.0)	21.8 (71.2)	21.8 (71.2)	21.2 (70.2)	20.2 (68.4)	17.8 (64.0)	15.6 (60.1)	19.9 (67.8)
Average precipitation mm (inches)	4 (0.2)	2 (0.1)	3 (0.1)	28 (1.1)	61 (2.4)	51 (2.0)	81 (3.2)	73 (2.9)	111 (4.4)	143 (5.6)	54 (2.1)	32 (1.3)	643 (25.4)

Source : Climate

Madanapalle has mild to warm summers with average high temperatures of 30 to 35 °C (86 to 95 °F). Temperatures do not exceed 40 °C (104 °F) and winters are cold with temperatures between 7 and 15 °C (45 and 59 °F). Usually summer lasts from March to June, with the advent of rainy season in June, followed by winter which lasts till the end of February.

== Demographics ==
As of 2011 Census of India, the town had a population of 180,180. The total population constitute, 90,700 males, 89,480 females and 13,448 children, in the age group of 0–6 years. The average literacy rate stands at 81.40% with 99,486 literates, significantly higher than the national average of 73.00%. According to the 2011 Census of India, Hinduism is the majority religion in Madanapalle at 77.52%, followed by Islam at 20.33% and Christianity at 1.73%. Telugu is the official and most widely spoken language in Madanapalle, while Urdu is spoken by a significant minority and Tamil is present due to proximity to the Tamil Nadu border. According to official census statistics, approximately 16.58% of the town's population (29,866 individuals) lived in designated slum areas across 7,354 households. Between 2001 and 2011, the population of Madanapalle grew by over 30%, driven primarily by rural-to-urban migration, expanding educational institutions, and its development as a major regional agricultural trading hub. In 2011, Madanapalle comprised 42,488 households, with an average family size of around 4.2 members per household, reflecting a trend toward nuclear family setups compared to rural Chittoor district. In addition to its major religious demographics, the town is home to small religious minorities, including Sikhs (0.08%), Jains (0.06%), and Buddhists (0.02%). Among the total 126,929 literate residents across the urban agglomeration, male literates numbered 68,678 (an 84.80% literacy rate among males), while female literates numbered 58,251 (a 72.41% literacy rate among females). Economic participation figures show that 62,398 individuals in the urban agglomeration were classified as active workers, with the vast majority engaged in trade, services, and non-agricultural urban labor. In terms of social stratification, Scheduled Castes (SC) constituted approximately 8.2% of the town's total population, while Scheduled Tribes (ST) accounted for 1.6%. Among the 0–6 child demographic, the child sex ratio stood at 930 females per 1,000 males, which was slightly lower than the overall urban sex ratio. Additionally, non-working dependents (including students, homemakers, and retirees) made up approximately 65.4% (117,782 individuals) of the total population.

== Governance ==
=== Civic administration ===
The municipality was formed on 1 April 1961 and is spread over an area of 14.20 km^{2} (5.48 mi^{2}). There are 35 election wards each represented by an elected member of the municipal council. Madanapalle urban agglomeration is spread over an area of 23.44 km^{2} (9.05 sq mi). Its constituents include the municipality of Madanapalle, the out growths of Angallu, Eedigapalle, Ankisettipalle, Chippili, Pamaiahgaripalle, Papireddipalle, Venkappakota, Basinikonda, Kollabylu, Ponnetipalem and Madanapalle (rural).

=== Politics ===
Madanapalle is an Assembly constituency in Andhra Pradesh and the constituency number is 164 in Rajampet Lok Sabha constituency.

Members of the Legislative Assembly for Madanapalle
S.No	Year	Party name	Name	Ref
1	1952	Communist Party of India (CPI)	Dodda Seetharamaiah	
2	1955	Indian National Congress (INC)	T. G. K. Gupta	
3	1962	Communist Party of India (CPI)	Dodda Seetharamaiah	
4	1967	Indian National Congress (INC)	A. Narasingarao	
5	1972	Indian National Congress (INC)	A. Narasingarao	
6	1978	Indian National Congress (INC)	G. V. Narayana Reddy	
7	1983	Telugu Desam Party (TDP)	R. Narayana Reddy	
8	1985	Telugu Desam Party (TDP)	R. Narayana Reddy	
9	1989	Indian National Congress (INC)	A. Mohan Reddy	
10	1994	Telugu Desam Party (TDP)	R. Sagar Reddy	
11	1999	Telugu Desam Party (TDP)	R. Shobha rani	
12	2004	Telugu Desam Party (TDP)	Dommalapati Ramesh	
13	2009	Indian National Congress (INC)	Mohammed Shahjahan Basha	
14	2014	YSRCP	Thippa Reddy	
15	2019	YSRCP	Nawaj Bhasha	
16	2024	Telugu Desam Party (TDP)	Mohammed Shahjahan Basha	

== Economy ==
The economy is based on agriculture and main products include tomato, mango, groundnut, tamarind. Madanapalle is the biggest tomato market in Asia. The tomatoes from here are supplied to most of the southern states & some of the northern states of India.Apart from tomatoes, Madanapalle serves as a primary regional trading center for horticulture produce, including mangoes, tamarind, groundnut, and custard apples, with the local Agriculture Market Committee (AMC) handling millions of metric tonnes of agricultural commodities annually for distribution across South India.

It is also famous for silk and silk products like saris and other casualsThe handloom and silk industry is heavily concentrated in neighborhoods such as Neerugattupalle, where hundreds of weaving families specialize in producing high-quality Madanapalle double-weave silk sarees using traditional looms and Jacquard weaving techniques, supplying wholesale markets across Bangalore, Kanchipuram, and Dharmavaram.

The region surrounding Madanapalle and nearby Bhasinikonda is rich in mineral deposits, driving a substantial local granite processing and stone-quarrying sector that exports raw and polished granite blocks.Small-scale industrial manufacturing and food-processing activities in the town are facilitated through the APIIC (Andhra Pradesh Industrial Infrastructure Corporation) Industrial Estate located near the urban limits, which supports agro-based industries, cold storage plants, and garment manufacturing units.

== Transport ==
Madanapalle is very well connected by road and rail. There are three Bus terminals in Madanapalle. State owned APSRTC buses run to different parts of the district, state and interstate – Bengaluru (KA), Kolar (KA), Chintamani (KA) and Chennai (TN), Vellore (TN).

Madanapalle Road Railway Station (MPL) is situated on Dharmavarm - Pakala Branch line and all trains stop here. Trains are available here to travel to Guntakal, Tirupati, Vijayawada. Daily trains are available from and to Guntakal & Tirupati. Other nearest Railway Station is Kurabalakota Railway Station where only Passenger trains stop. New Kadapa to Kolar via Madanapalle Railway line is under construction it Kadapa–Bangalore section.In this project planned to Upgrade Madanapalle Road Railway station as Junction and one New Railway station to Madanapalle Town.

Three National Highways and One Major State Highway passes through Madanapalle.

NH 71 - Madanapalle to Naidupeta Via Pileru

NH 42 - Uravakonda to Krishnagiri Via Kuppam

NH 340 - Kadapa to Bangalore.

=== Airways ===
The nearest airports are Kempegowda International Airport , Bengaluru, which is 114 kilometres (71 mi), Tirupati International Airport, which is 128 kilometres (80 mi) & Kadapa Airport which is 131 kilometres (81 mi) .

== Education ==
Primary and secondary education is provided by government schools, aided schools and private schools, under the School Education Department of the state. The languages of instruction are English and Telugu.

Schools:

- Rishi Valley School is a boarding school, founded by the philosopher Jiddu Krishnamurti and operated by the Krishnamurti Foundation India.
- Zilla Parishad High School, Madanapalle, was a district high school (ZPHS) founded in 1924.

It also has several post-secondary institutions:

- Besant Theosophical College
- Madanapalle Institute of Technology and Science (Deemed-To-Be-University)
- Aditya College of Engineering
- Gnanambhika degree college
- Golden Valley Integrated Campus
- Government Girls College, Madanapalle
- Govt degree college
- Indian School of Agriculture (ISA)
- Krishna Reddy Siddhartha Junior College
- Siddartha degree college
- Sri Srinivasa degree college
- Venkata Reddy Siddhartha Junior College
- Viswahita degree college
- Viswam Engineering College
- Viswam Group of Institutions
- Vivekanandha degree college

The government of Andhra Pradesh is planning to establish the Government Medical College near Madanapalle and land acquisition has started.

== Entertainment ==
There were many cinema theatres. At this moment, theatres Sai Chitra, Ravi, Sunil, A.S.R, Sree Krishna, Siddartha, Mini Siddartha only operating. Madhusudhana, Pancharatna, Avanthi, Usha, Jyothi, Mallikarjuna, Mini Mallikarjuna, Sesh Mahal, Bhavani, M.S.R.(Tarakarama) theatres closed or converted for other business purpose now. While traditional single-screen theatres like Madhusudhana, Pancharatna, and Sesh Mahal closed down or converted into commercial complexes, the surviving venues like Sai Chitra and Siddartha upgraded to digital projection systems (including 4K laser projection and Dolby Atmos sound) to cater to modern cinemagoers.For outdoor entertainment and tourism, residents and visitors frequently utilize Horsley Hills (Yenugulla Mallamma Konda), a hill station located about 27 km from Madanapalle, which serves as the primary regional retreat for natural recreation, adventure sports, and scenic viewpoints.Cultural programs, drama performances, and community celebrations in Madanapalle are hosted across local auditoriums and town halls, including public venues on BT College Road and municipal gathering spaces utilized during annual festivals like Sankranti and Vinayaka Chavithi.Due to its surrounding picturesque landscapes and historical heritage buildings like Besant Theosophical College, Madanapalle and its nearby rural stretches have occasionally served as backdrop locations for Telugu cinema film shoots and regional arts events.The town's central commercial activity is concentrated along major thoroughfares such as C.T.M. Road, Kadiri Road, and Nehru Bazaar, which house dense clusters of retail hubs, textile markets, and traditional bazaars.In addition to traditional street markets, modern retail in Madanapalle includes multi-storey commercial complexes and departmental chains such as Dhanalakshmi Shopping Mall, Metro Complex, and Vishal Mega Mart, which serve as popular destinations for everyday shopping and leisure.Madanapalle is also recognized for its vibrant handloom and silk saree retail sector, with dedicated textile markets and saree hubs operating in regions like Neerugattupalle.Recreational sports and community athletic events in Madanapalle are largely centered around historical grounds such as the BT College Ground and CSI Mission Compound Ground, alongside modern private turf facilities that cater to box cricket, football, and youth sports tournaments.Local entertainment and community life heavily feature traditional folk festivals, most notably the annual Gangamma Jatara celebrations, during which street fairs, cultural processions, and folk dance performances take place across the town's major streets and temple compounds.The town's leisure culture includes a growing restaurant and street food sector, ranging from traditional Rayalaseema culinary eateries to highway dhabas and family dining restaurants along National Highway 42 (NH 42) and C.T.M. Road.Public green spaces like TVR Nagar Park and municipal gardens serve as key neighborhood spots for family recreation, morning walks, and outdoor children's play areas within the urban limits.

== Notable people ==
- Annie Besant – British theosophist, women's rights activist, and Indian home-rule campaigner who established the famous Besant Theosophical College in Madanapalle in 1915.
- Margaret Cousins – Irish-Indian suffragist and musician who set the musical tune and notation for India's national anthem alongside Rabindranath Tagore while residing in Madanapalle.
- Jiddu Krishnamurti - philosopher
- Bindu Madhavi - Tamil film actress
- Sri Madhukarnath - Yogi and spiritual teacher
- Pattipati Ramaiah Naidu - Indian Physicist and Father of Medical Physics
- Rabindranath Tagore – Nobel laureate poet who stayed at Besant Theosophical College in Madanapalle in 1919, where he translated India's national anthem "Jana Gana Mana" from Bengali into English as "Morning Song of India".

== See also ==
- List of cities in Andhra Pradesh by population
- List of municipalities in Andhra Pradesh
