= Karimnagar (disambiguation) =

Karimnagar is a city and headquarters of the Karimnagar district in the state of Telangana.

Karimnagar may also refer to:

- Karimnagar district, a district in the state of Telangana
- Karimnagar (Assembly constituency), constituency of Telangana Legislative Assembly, India
- Karimnagar (Lok Sabha constituency), one of the 17 Lok Sabha constituencies in Telangana

== See also ==
- Karimnagar railway station, Telangana, India
