= 1971 Indian general election in Andhra Pradesh =

- November 1971

41 seats
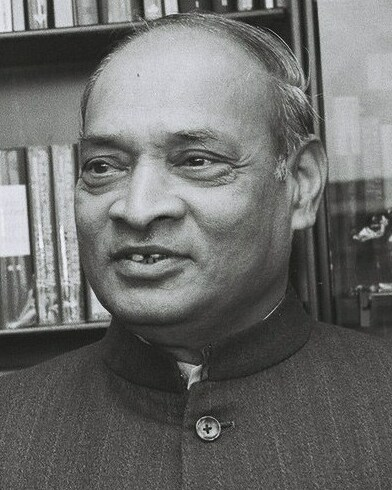

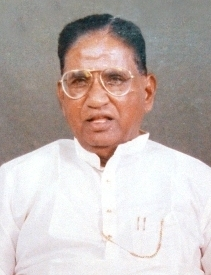
	First party	Second party
Leader	P. V. Narasimha Rao	Marri Chenna Reddy
Party	INC(R)	TPS
Alliance	Congress alliance	Nonpartisan
Leader's seat	None	None
Last election	35	new party
Seats won	28	10
Seat change	▼7	▲10
Popular vote	7,286,069	1,873,589
Percentage	55.73%	14.33%
Swing	▲8.91%	▲14.33%
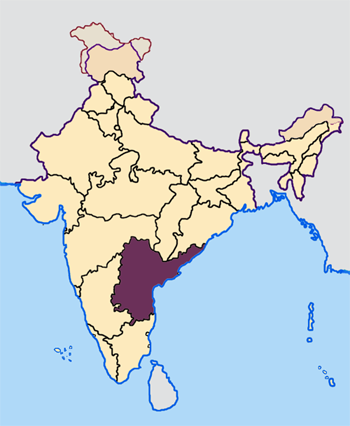
- Andhra Pradesh
Prime Minister before election
Indira Gandhi
INC
Prime Minister after election
Indira Gandhi
INC(R)

The 1971 Indian general election in Andhra Pradesh were held for 42 seats in the state. The result was a victory for the Indian National Congress which won 28 out of 42 seats. This election also saw introduction of Telangana Praja Samithi which won 10 out of the 14 seats it contested, mostly in the Telangana region.

== Voting and results ==
=== Results by Party ===
Party Name	Popular vote			Seats		
Party Name	Votes	%	±pp	Contested	Won	+/−
INC	72,86,069	55.73	▲8.91	37	28	▼7
TPS	18,73,589	14.33	New	14	10	▲10
CPI	7,76,019	5.94	▼6.68	11	1	Steady
INC(O)	7,25,996	5.55	New	12	0	Steady
SWA	5,97,777	4.57	▼9.18	9	0	▼3
CPI(M)	3,68,713	2.82	▼3.38	5	1	Steady
BJS	2,05,556	1.57	▲0.57	5	0	Steady
Others	1,66,972	1.27	Steady	21	0	Steady
IND	10,72,692	8.21	▼10.31	93	1	▼1
Total	1,30,73,383	100%	-	207	41	-

== Detailed Results ==
Constituency			Winner				Runner Up				Margin	%
#	Name	Poll %	Candidate	Party	Votes	%	Candidate	Party	Votes	%	Margin	%
1	Srikakulam	67.84%	B. Rajagopala Rao	INC	2,33,171	69.48	N. G. Ranga	SWA	95,710	28.52	1,37,461	40.96
2	Paravathipuram (ST)	51.77%	B. Satyanarayana	INC	1,90,975	73.82	Narasimharo Viswasarai	SWA	38,847	15.02	1,52,128	58.80
3	Bobbili	53.82%	K. Narayana Rao	INC	2,23,043	84.51	R. Chandrasekhara Rao	SWA	40,874	15.49	1,82,169	69.02
4	Visakhapatnam	58.87%	P. V. G. Raju	IND	1,84,464	57.63	T. Viswanadham	IND	1,17,276	36.64	67,188	20.99
5	Bhadrachalam (ST)	40.95%	B. Radhabai Rao	INC	1,15,367	58.54	Nupa Bojji	CPI	47,319	24.01	68,048	34.53
6	Anakapalli	57.99%	S. R. A. S. Appala Naidu	INC	2,15,209	69.06	V. V. Ramana	SWA	69,115	22.18	1,46,094	46.88
7	Kakinada	64.62%	M. S. Sanjeevi Rao	INC	3,13,060	87.47	P. V. N. Raju	ABJS	20,134	5.63	2,92,926	81.84
8	Rajahmundry	68.54%	Pattabhirama Rao	INC	2,50,124	64.59	Prabhakara Ch. Chitturi	CPI	53,642	13.85	1,96,482	50.74
9	Amalapuram (SC)	66.74%	B. S. Murthy	INC	3,01,405	82.13	Penumala Gopalakrishna	NCO	43,846	11.95	2,57,559	70.18
10	Narasapur	65.49%	M. T. Raju	INC	2,85,356	72.60	Uddaraju Raman	CPM	92,601	23.56	1,92,755	49.04
11	Eluru	64.15%	Kommareddi Suryanarayana	INC	2,35,933	66.31	V. V. G. Tilak	CPI	60,878	17.11	1,75,055	49.20
12	Gudivada	68.97%	Ankinedu Maganti	INC	2,79,225	70.90	H. R. Sayoji Ra	SWA	68,791	17.47	2,10,434	53.43
13	Vijayawada	64.78%	K. L. Rao	INC	2,51,917	69.88	D. Nagabhushana Rao	CPI	95,913	26.61	1,56,004	43.27
14	Machilipatnam	68.53%	Meduri Nageswarrao	INC	2,78,514	75.39	Venkataswamy Mandala	SWA	73,640	19.93	2,04,874	55.46
15	Ongole	68.48%	P. Ankineedu Prasada Rao	INC	2,84,597	70.89	Gogineni Bharati Devi	SWA	1,04,703	26.08	1,79,894	44.81
16	Guntur	67.33%	Kotha Raghuramaiah	INC	2,60,086	62.45	Jupudi Yagna Narayana	ABJS	69,068	16.59	1,91,018	45.86
17	Narasaraopet	59.23%	Maddi Sudarsanam	INC	2,37,264	64.84	Yeeram C. Narasimharao	IND	1,06,413	29.08	1,30,851	35.76
18	Kavali	56.15%	Puli Venkata Reddy	INC	1,96,492	59.80	Rebala D. Rama Reddy	NCO	65,378	19.90	1,31,114	39.90
19	Nellore (SC)	61.04%	Doddav Arapukamakshiah	INC	2,35,658	66.18	Bangapulakshman	ABJS	61,724	17.33	1,73,934	48.85
20	Tirupathi (SC)	54.88%	Balakrishnaiah Thamburu	INC	2,31,262	75.08	C. V. Siddaiahmurthy	SWA	76,753	24.92	1,54,509	50.16
21	Chittoor	69.07%	P. Narasimha Reddy	INC	2,45,052	67.81	K. P. Chengalraya Naidu	NCO	1,16,313	32.19	1,28,739	35.62
22	Rajampet	62.35%	Parthasarathi Pothuraju	INC	2,43,603	72.97	Yesoda Reddy	NCO	65,735	19.69	1,77,868	53.28
23	Cuddapah	58.78%	Yieswara Reddy	CPI	2,00,713	60.26	Vutukuru Rami Reddy	NCO	1,07,099	32.16	93,614	28.10
24	Hindupur	54.89%	P. Bayapa Reddy	INC	1,98,127	69.65	P. Ravindra Reddy	NCO	74,117	26.05	1,24,010	43.60
25	Anantapur	59.87%	Antony Reddi Ponnapati	INC	2,00,701	62.68	Neelam Sanjeeva Reddy	NCO	1,11,644	34.87	89,057	27.81
26	Kurnool	58.68%	Kodanda Rami Reddy	INC	2,70,697	87.15	Y. Gadiingana Gowdu	SWA	29,344	9.45	2,41,353	77.70
27	Nandyal	59.05%	P. Venkatasubbaiah	INC	2,25,740	66.18	Kanala Anki Reddy	NCO	95,284	27.94	1,30,456	38.24
28	Nagarkurnool (SC)	52.59%	M. Bheeshmadev	TPS	1,49,781	56.51	P. Mahendranath	INC	1,04,381	39.38	45,400	17.13
29	Mahbubnagar	49.06%	J. Rameshwar Rao	TPS	1,27,949	48.35	D. K. Satya Reddy	INC	1,10,459	41.74	17,490	6.61
30	Hyderabad	49.43%	G. S. Melkote	TPS	1,34,941	57.27	Badr-Ud-Dintyabji	IND	85,529	36.30	49,412	20.97
31	Secunderabad	43.23%	M. M. Hashim	TPS	98,620	45.49	K. L. Narayan	INC	74,977	34.58	23,643	10.91
32	Siddipet (SC)	52.46%	G. Venkat Swamy	TPS	1,69,436	65.08	A. R. Devraj	CPI	79,851	30.67	89,585	34.41
33	Medak	50.19%	Mallikarjun	TPS	1,52,975	58.62	Narsimha Reddy	INC	99,544	38.14	53,431	20.48
34	Nizamabad	56.33%	Ram Gopal Reddy M.	INC	1,55,323	51.73	Ananth Reddy K.	TPS	95,586	31.83	59,737	19.90
35	Adilabad	58.90%	P. Ganga Reddy	INC	1,51,482	52.60	K. V. Kishan Rao	TPS	1,36,532	47.40	14,950	5.20
36	Peddapalli (SC)	48.33%	V. Tulasiram	TPS	1,65,054	66.45	M. R. Krishna	INC	56,323	22.68	1,08,731	43.77
37	Karimnagar	47.97%	M. Satyanarayan Rao	TPS	1,19,869	47.19	V. Jalapathi Rao	INC	1,09,848	43.25	10,021	3.94
38	Warangal	60.99%	S. B. Giri	TPS	1,82,258	55.62	K. Sudarsana Reddy	INC	88,618	27.04	93,640	28.58
39	Khammam	70.14%	T. Lakshmi Kantamma	INC	1,37,830	36.94	Chekuri Kasaiah	TPS	1,21,369	32.53	16,461	4.41
40	Nalgonda	59.36%	K. Ram Krishna Reddy	TPS	1,11,704	35.53	Vedire Narsimha Reddy	INC	1,06,306	33.81	5,398	1.72
41	Miryalguda	63.53%	Bhimreddy Reddy	CPM	1,15,199	34.78	Keesara Jithender Reddy	TPS	1,07,515	32.46	7,684	2.32

== See also ==
- Elections in Andhra Pradesh
