= Rajalingampet =

- Village
- Location in Telangana, India Rajalingampet (India)
- Coordinates: 18.665385°N 78.759664°E
- Country: India
- State: Telangana
- District: Jagtial

Government
  - Member of Parliament: Vinod Kumar Boianapalli

Languages
  - Official: Telugu
- Time zone: UTC+5:30 (IST)
- Postal Code: 505306

Rajalingampet is a village in Jagtial district of the Indian state of Telangana.

== Geography ==
Rajalingampet is located at 18.665385°N 78.759664°E
