= Elections in Andhra Pradesh =

Andhra Pradesh in India

Elections in Andhra Pradesh are conducted in accordance with the Constitution of India. The Assembly of Andhra Pradesh creates laws regarding the conduct of local body elections unilaterally while any changes by the state legislature to the conduct of state level elections need to be approved by the Parliament of India. In addition, the state legislature may be dismissed by the Parliament according to Article 356 of the Indian Constitution and President's rule may be imposed.

== Electoral system ==
In 2014, Andhra Pradesh (Total 294 seats) was bifurcated into Andhra Pradesh (175 seats) and Telangana (119 seats) states.

=== National level ===
==== Lok Sabha ====
Andhra Pradesh is represented by a total of 25 MP's in the Lok Sabha. From the total of 25 seats, 20 belong to the general category candidates and the other 5 are reserved for the SC/ST category. In the 2024 Andhra Pradesh Legislative Assembly election, out of 25 seats, National Democratic Alliance won 21 seats, while Yuvajana Sramika Rythu Congress Party managed to win 4 seats.

==== Rajya Sabha ====
Both houses of the state legislature jointly nominate Members to the Rajya Sabha.

=== State level ===
==== Legislative Assembly ====
The Andhra Pradesh legislature assembly has 175 seats. For the election of its members, the state is divided into 175 Assembly Constituencies in which the candidate securing the largest number of votes is declared elected.

==== Legislative Council ====
The Upper House known as the Legislative Council has lesser powers than the Assembly and several of its members are nominated by the Assembly; others are elected from various sections of society, such as Graduates and Teachers. Currently the Legislative Council consists of 58 members.

== Electoral history ==
The first general elections were conducted in Andhra state in 1955, for 196 constituencies representing 11 Districts. In 1956, the United Andhra Pradesh State Legislative Assembly had 294 seats representing 23 districts. From 1956 to 1958 the United Andhra Pradesh Legislature was Unicameral. In 1958, the Legislative Council was formed, making the legislature Bicameral. The council was later abolished, and the legislature became Unicameral again until March 2007 when it was re-established and elections were held for its seats as per The Andhra Pradesh Legislative Council Bill, 2004. From 2014 there are 175 constituencies in Andhra Legislative Assembly and 58 constituencies Andhra Legislative Council.

1957 Legislative Assembly election result

1962 Legislative Assembly election result

1967 Legislative Assembly election result

1972 Legislative Assembly election result

1978 Legislative Assembly election result

1983 Legislative Assembly election result

1985 Legislative Assembly election result

1989 Legislative Assembly election result

1994 Legislative Assembly election result

1999 Legislative Assembly election result

2004 Legislative Assembly election result

2009 Legislative Assembly election result

2014 Legislative Assembly election result

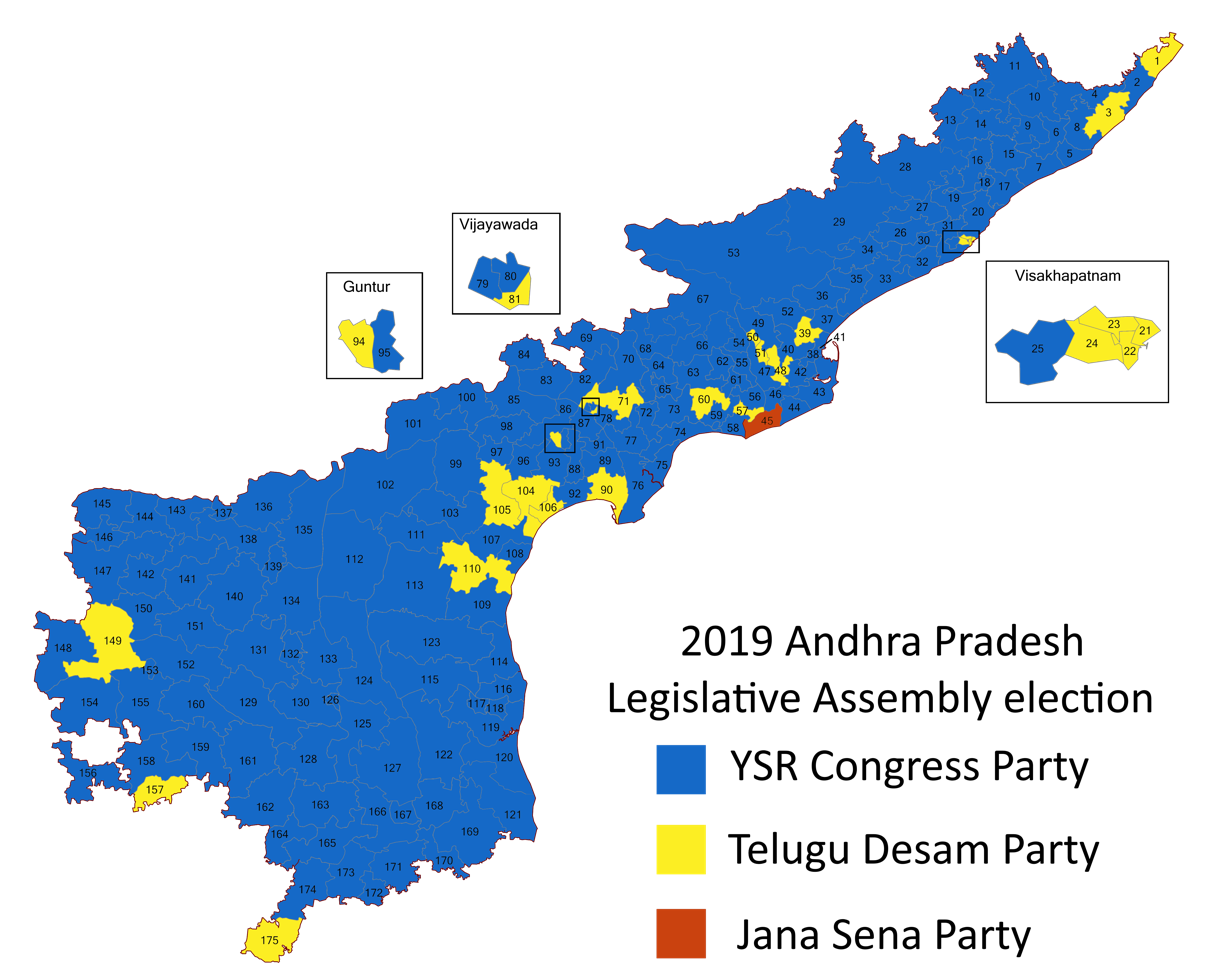
2019 Legislative Assembly election result

2024 Legislative Assembly election result

=== Main political parties ===
Telugu Desam Party (TDP), Jana Sena Party (JSP), YSR Congress Party (YSRCP), Bharatiya Janata Party (BJP), Indian National Congress (INC), Communist Party of India (CPI), Communist Party of India (Marxist) (CPIM).

== General (Lok Sabha) elections ==
| Lok Sabha (Election) | Total seats | 1st party | | | | 2nd party | | | | 3rd party | | | | | | | | Other party | |
| Lok Sabha (Election) | Total seats | Party | Seats | Party | Seats | Party | Seats | Party | Seats | Party | Seats | Party | Seats | Party | Seats | Party | Seats | Party | Seats |
|---|---|---|---|---|---|---|---|---|---|---|---|---|---|---|---|---|---|---|---|
| 1st (Note: 1st general election was conducted in 1952 for the Madras State and the Andhra majority area was still part of it with 28 seats until the formation of Andhra State in the year 1953) (1951) | 28 | Indian National Congress | 6 | Communist Party of India | 6 | Kisan Mazdoor Praja Party | 2 | Socialist Party | 2 | IND 12 | 12 | | | | | | | | |
| 2nd (1957) | 43 | Indian National Congress | 37 | | | | | | | | | | | | | | | | |
| 3rd (1962) | 43 | Indian National Congress | 34 | | | Communist Party of India | 7 | | | Swatantra Party | 1 | IND 1 | 1 | – | | | | | |
| 4th (1967) | 41 | Indian National Congress | 35 | | | Swatantra Party | 3 | | | IND 2 | 2 | – | | | | | | Communist Party of India | 1 |
| 5th (1971) | 41 | Indian National Congress | 28 | | | Telangana Praja Samithi | 10 | | | Communist Party of India | 1 | Communist Party of India (Marxist) | 1 | IND 1 | 1 | – | | | |
| 6th (1977) | 42 | Indian National Congress (R) | 41 | | | | 1 | | | – | | | | | | | | | |
| 7th (1980) | 42 | Indian National Congress (R) | 42 | | | – | | | | | | | | | | | | | |
| 8th (1984) | 42 | Telugu Desam Party | 31 | | | Indian National Congress | 6 | | | | | | | | | | | | |
| 9th (1989) | 42 | Indian National Congress | 39 | | | Telugu Desam Party | 2 | | | All India Majlis-e-Ittehadul Muslimeen | 1 | – | | | | | | | |
| 10th (1991) | 42 | Indian National Congress | 25 | | | Telugu Desam Party | 13 | | | Communist Party of India | 1 | Communist Party of India (Marxist) | 1 | Bharatiya Janata Party | 1 | All India Majlis-e-Ittehadul Muslimeen | 1 | – | |
| 11th (1996) | 42 | Indian National Congress | 22 | | | Telugu Desam Party | 16 | | | Communist Party of India | 2 | – | | | | | | CPI(M) 1 | 1 |
| 12th (1998) | 42 | Indian National Congress | 22 | | | Telugu Desam Party | 12 | | | Bharatiya Janata Party | 4 | – | | | | | | Communist Party of India | 2 |
| 13th (1999) | 42 | Telugu Desam Party | 29 | | | Bharatiya Janata Party | 7 | | | Indian National Congress | 5 | – | | | | | | All India Majlis-e-Ittehadul Muslimeen | 1 |
| 14th (2004) | 42 | Indian National Congress | 29 | | | Telugu Desam Party | 5 | Telangana Rashtra Samithi | 2 | Communist Party of India | 1 | Communist Party of India (Marxist) | 1 | All India Majlis-e-Ittehadul Muslimeen | 1 | – | | | |
| 15th (2009) | 42 | Indian National Congress | 33 | | | Telugu Desam Party | 6 | | | Telangana Rashtra Samithi | 2 | – | | | | | | All India Majlis-e-Ittehadul Muslimeen | 1 |
| 16th (2014) | 25 | Telugu Desam Party | 15 | | | YSR Congress Party | 8 | | | Bharatiya Janata Party | 2 | – | | | | | | | |
| 17th (2019) | 25 | YSR Congress Party | 22 | | | Telugu Desam Party | 3 | | | – | | | | | | | | | |
| 18th (2024) | 25 | Telugu Desam Party | 16 | Bharatiya Janata Party | 3 | Jana Sena Party | 2 | | | YSR Congress Party | 4 | – | | | | | | | |

== Assembly elections ==
=== Andhra State (1953–1956) ===
| Year | Election | Chief Minister | Party | Party-wise seats details | Opposition Leader |
|---|---|---|---|---|---|
| 1955 | First Assembly | Bezawada Gopala Reddy | (Congress) | Total: 196. Congress: 119; CPI: 15, Independents: 8 | Puchalapalli Sundarayya |

=== Andhra Pradesh (1956–present) ===
| Year | Election | Chief Minister | Party | Party-wise seats details | Opposition Leader |
|---|---|---|---|---|---|
| 1957 | First Assembly | Neelam Sanjiva Reddy Damodaram Sanjivayya | (Congress) | INC 68; PDF 22; Independent 12; Total 105 | Puchalapalli Sundarayya |
| 1962 | Second Assembly | Neelam Sanjiva Reddy; Kasu Brahmananda Reddy | (Congress) | Total: 300. Congress: 177; CPI: 51, Swatantra Party: 19, Independents: 51 | Puchalapalli Sundarayya |
| 1967 | Third Assembly | Kasu Brahmananda Reddy; P.V. Narasimha Rao | (Congress) | Total: 287. Congress: 165; Swatantra Party: 29, CPM: 9, CPI: 11, BJS : 3, RPI: 1, SSP: 1, Independents: 68 | T. Nagi Reddy |
| 1972 | Fourth Assembly | P.V. Narasimha Rao; Jalagam Vengala Rao | (Congress) | Congress: 219/287, Independents: 57. | Vacant |
| 1978 | Fifth Assembly | Marri Chenna Reddy; T. Anjaiah; Bhavanam Venkatarami Reddy; Kotla Vijaya Bhaskara Reddy | Congress(Indira) | Total: 294. INC(I)+Congress: 205, Janata Party: 60, Ind: 15. | Gouthu Latchanna |
| 1983 | Sixth Assembly | Nandamuri Taraka Rama Rao; Nadendla Bhaskara Rao | (Telugu Desam) (Rebel TDP Group) | Total: 294. Telugu Desam: Approx 205. Congress: 60, BJP: 3, CPI: 4, CPM: 5. | Mogaligundla Baga Reddy |
| 1985 | Seventh Assembly | Nandamuri Taraka Rama Rao (2) | Telugu Desam Party | Total: 294. TDP: 202, Congress: 50; BJP: 8, Janata Party: 3, CPI: 11, CPM: 11 | Mogaligundla Baga Reddy |
| 1989 | Eighth Assembly | M Chenna Reddy (2); Nedurumalli Janardhana Reddy; Kotla Vijaya Bhaskara Reddy (2) | Congress | Total: 294. Congress: 181, TDP: 74. | N T Rama Rao |
| 1994 | Ninth Assembly | Nandamuri Taraka Rama Rao (3); Nara Chandrababu Naidu | Telugu Desam Party | Total: 294. TDP: 216, Congress: 26, CPI: 19, CPM: 15, BJP: 3 | P. Janardhan Reddy |
| 1999 | Tenth Assembly | Nara Chandrababu Naidu (2) | (Telugu Desam Party) | Total: 294. TDP+BJP: 180+10 = 190, Congress: 91 | Y. S. Rajasekhara Reddy |
| 2004 | Eleventh Assembly | Y. S. Rajasekhara Reddy | Congress | Total: 294. Congress: 185, TDP: 47, TRS: 26, CPM:9, CPI:6, MIM:4, BJP:2, BSP:1 | Nara Chandrababu Naidu |
| 2009 | Twelfth Assembly | Y. S. Rajasekhara Reddy (2); Konijeti Rosaiah; Kiran Kumar Reddy | Congress | Total: 294. Congress: 156. TDP: 92, Praja Rajyam Party: 18, TRS: 10. | Nara Chandrababu Naidu |
| 2014 | Thirteenth Assembly | Nara Chandrababu Naidu(3) | TDP | Total: 175. TDP: 102. BJP:4; YSR Congress: 67 | Y S Jagan Mohan Reddy |
| 2019 | Fourteenth Assembly | Y S Jagan Mohan Reddy | YSRCP | Total: 175. YSR Congress:151, TDP: 23, JSP:1. | Nara Chandrababu Naidu |
| 2024 | Fifteenth Assembly | Nara Chandrababu Naidu(4) | TDP | Total: 175. TDP: 135, JSP:21, BJP:8, YSR Congress:11. | vacant |

=== Performance of Political Parties ===
| 9 | 6 | 1 |
| INC | TDP | YSRCP |

Andhra Pradesh Legislative Assembly
| Political Party | 1955 | 1957 | 1962 | 1967 | 1972 | 1978 | 1983 | 1985 | 1989 | 1994 | 1999 | 2004 | 2009 | 2014 | 2019 | 2024 |
|---|---|---|---|---|---|---|---|---|---|---|---|---|---|---|---|---|
| INC | 119 | 68 | 177 | 165 | 219 | 30 | 60 | 50 | 181 | 26 | 91 | 185 | 156 | 0 | 0 | 0 |
| JP | NCP | NCP | NCP | NCP | NCP | 60 | 1 | 3 | 0 | 0 | 0 | 0 | 0 | M/D | NCP | NCP |
| BJP | NCP | NCP | NCP | NCP | NCP | NCP | 3 | 8 | 5 | 3 | 12 | 2 | 2 | 4 | 0 | 8 |
| CPI | 15 | 0 | 51 | 11 | 7 | 6 | 6 | 11 | 8 | 19 | 0 | 6 | 4 | 0 | 0 | 0 |
| CPI(M) | NCP | NCP | CPI | 9 | 1 | 8 | 5 | 11 | 6 | 15 | 2 | 9 | 1 | 0 | 0 | 0 |
| TDP | NCP | NCP | NCP | NCP | NCP | NCP | 201 | 202 | 74 | 216 | 180 | 47 | 92 | 102 | 23 | 135 |
| TRS | NCP | NCP | NCP | NCP | NCP | NCP | NCP | NCP | NCP | NCP | TDP | 26 | 10 | NCP | NCP | NCP |
| AIMIM | NCP | NCP | NCP | NCP | NCP | NCP | NCP | NCP | 4 | 1 | 4 | 4 | 7 | NCP | NCP | NCP |
| PRP | NCP | NCP | NCP | NCP | NCP | NCP | NCP | NCP | NCP | NCP | NCP | NCP | 18 | INC | NCP | NCP |
| LSP | NCP | NCP | NCP | NCP | NCP | NCP | NCP | NCP | NCP | NCP | NCP | NCP | 1 | NC (Note: Party is functioning but not into active Politics) | NC | NC |
| YSRCP | NCP | NCP | NCP | NCP | NCP | NCP | NCP | NCP | NCP | NCP | NCP | NCP | INC | 67 (Note: Due to its contesting in By-elections earlier this is not treated as Debut) | 151 | 11 |
| JSP | NCP | NCP | NCP | NCP | NCP | NCP | NCP | NCP | NCP | NCP | NCP | NCP | NCP | NC (Note: Outside support to NDA which included TDP and BJP) | 0 | 21 |
| Independents (Note: Independents and Others may differ due to lack of differentiation) | 22 | 13 | 51 | 68 | 57 | 15 | 0 | 0 | 15 | 0 | 5 | 0 | 3 | 1 | 0 | 0 |
| Others | 40 | 24 | 21 | 34 | 3 | 175 (Note: All these 175 seats were secured by the INC faction INC(R)) | 20 | 9 | 1 | 2 | 0 | 15 | 0 | 1 | 0 | 0 |
| Total | 196 | 105 | 300 | 287 | 287 | 294 | 294 | 294 | 294 | 294 | 294 | 294 | 294 | 175 | 175 | 175 |

Legend
| Particular | Representation |
|---|---|
| Did not exist/Did not contest previously | NCP |
| Merger/Dissolved | M/D |
| Split | |
| Debut | |
| Did not contest | NC |

== History of political parties ==
The Indian National Congress (INC) won a majority of seats at the state level continuously from the formation of the state until 1983 when the Telugu Desam Party (TDP) was formed by Actor N.T.Rama Rao, the first non-Congress government in the state. From 1984 to 2004, the politics of the state was essentially a two party system. The INC regained the state from 1989 to 1994.

The TDP formed the state government from 1994 to 2004. In 2004, the INC formed the government again. This government also completed its second term having won the Assembly elections in 2009. The Praja Rajyam Party (PRP) was formed in 2008 by Telugu Film Actor Chiranjeevi; that party won the third largest number of seats in the 2009 state assembly elections and then merged into congress. After the death of the chief minister Y. S. Rajashekar Reddy his son Y. S. Jagan Mohan Reddy came into the lime light. He has resigned from congress after disputes with congress leadership at center.

The state had an ongoing sub-regionalist Telangana movement with the Telangana Rashtra Samithi (TRS) being formed in 2001 on this platform. And under the leadership of K Chandrashekar Rao separate state of Telangana was carved out of Andhra Pradesh. Then during next elections TDP had emerged with highest number of seats after fighting the elections with BJP and Pawan Kalyan who was entering politics during that time. Y. S. Jagan Mohan Reddy has formed a new party after resigning from congress named Y. S. R Congress party which was the main opposition from 2014–2019. During this period JanaSena the party of Pawan Kalyan cut ties with TDP due to conflict on special status of Andhra Pradesh which was one of the commitments during the states bifurcation in 2014. Also TDP cut ties with BJP in 2019 for the same reason.

During 2019 Assembly and Lok Sabha elections YSR congress party won with a landslide victory in both elections. TDP was in opposition in the state assembly. JanaSena getting third highest percentage of votes and both BJP and Congress became small parties in Andhra Pradesh.

During 2024 Assembly and Lok Sabha elections (total 175) TDP won (135) with a landslide historic victory in both elections. Currently there is no actual opposition in the state assembly since the opposition YSRCP did not secure enough seats (required 18, won 11). JanaSena getting second highest no. of seats (21) and BJP (8) in Andhra Pradesh.

== Election Commission ==
Elections in Andhra Pradesh are conducted by the Election Commission of India whose state level head is the Chief Election Commissioner of Andhra Pradesh, the authority created under the Constitution. It is a well established convention that once the election process commences, no courts intervene until the results are declared by the election commission. During the elections, vast powers are assigned to the election commission to the extent that it can function as a civil court, if needed.

== Electoral process ==
The latest election in Andhra Pradesh were conducted in two phases. All citizens of India above 18 years of age are eligible to enrol as voters in the electoral rolls. It is the responsibility of the eligible voters to enrol. Normally, voter registrations are allowed at latest one week prior to the last date for nomination of candidates.

=== Pre elections ===
The Election Commission's Model Code of Conduct enters into force as soon as the notification for polls is issued. This places restrictions on the campaigning by political parties as well as prohibits certain government actions that would unduly influence the election.

=== Voting day ===
The electoral process is the same as in the rest of India with Electronic Voting Machines being used for all Lok Sabha and State Assembly elections.

=== Post elections ===
After the election day, the EVMs are stood stored in a strong room under heavy security. After the different phases of the elections are complete, a day is set to count the votes. The votes are tallied and typically, the verdict is known within hours. The candidate who has mustered the most votes is declared the winner of the constituency.

The party or coalition that has won the most seats is invited by the Governor to form the new government. The coalition or party must prove its majority in the floor of the house (Legislative Assembly) in a vote of confidence by obtaining a simple majority (minimum 50%) of the votes in the House.

== Absentee voting ==
As of now, India does not have an absentee ballot system. Section 19 of The Representation of the People Act (RPA)-1950 allows people to register to vote who are above 18 years of age and an 'ordinary resident' of the residing constituency i.e. living at the current address for 6 months or longer. Section 20 of the above Act disqualifies non-resident Indians (NRI) from getting their name registered in the electoral rolls. Consequently, it also prevents an NRI from casting a vote in elections to the Parliament and to the State Legislatures.

The Representation of the People (Amendment) 2006 Bill was introduced in the Parliament by Shri Hanraj Bharadwaj, Minister of Law and Justice during February 2006 with an objective to amend Section 20 of the RPA-1950 to enable NRIs to vote. Despite the report submitted by the Parliamentary Standing Committee two years ago, the Government has so far failed to act on the recommendations. The Bill was reintroduced in the 2008 budget session of the Parliament to the Lok Sabha. But no action taken once again.

Several civic society organisations have urged the government to amend the RPA act to allow NRI's and people on the move to cast their vote through absentee ballot system.

== See also ==
- Elections in India
