= 1977 Indian general election in Andhra Pradesh =

- 16–20 March 1977

42 seats

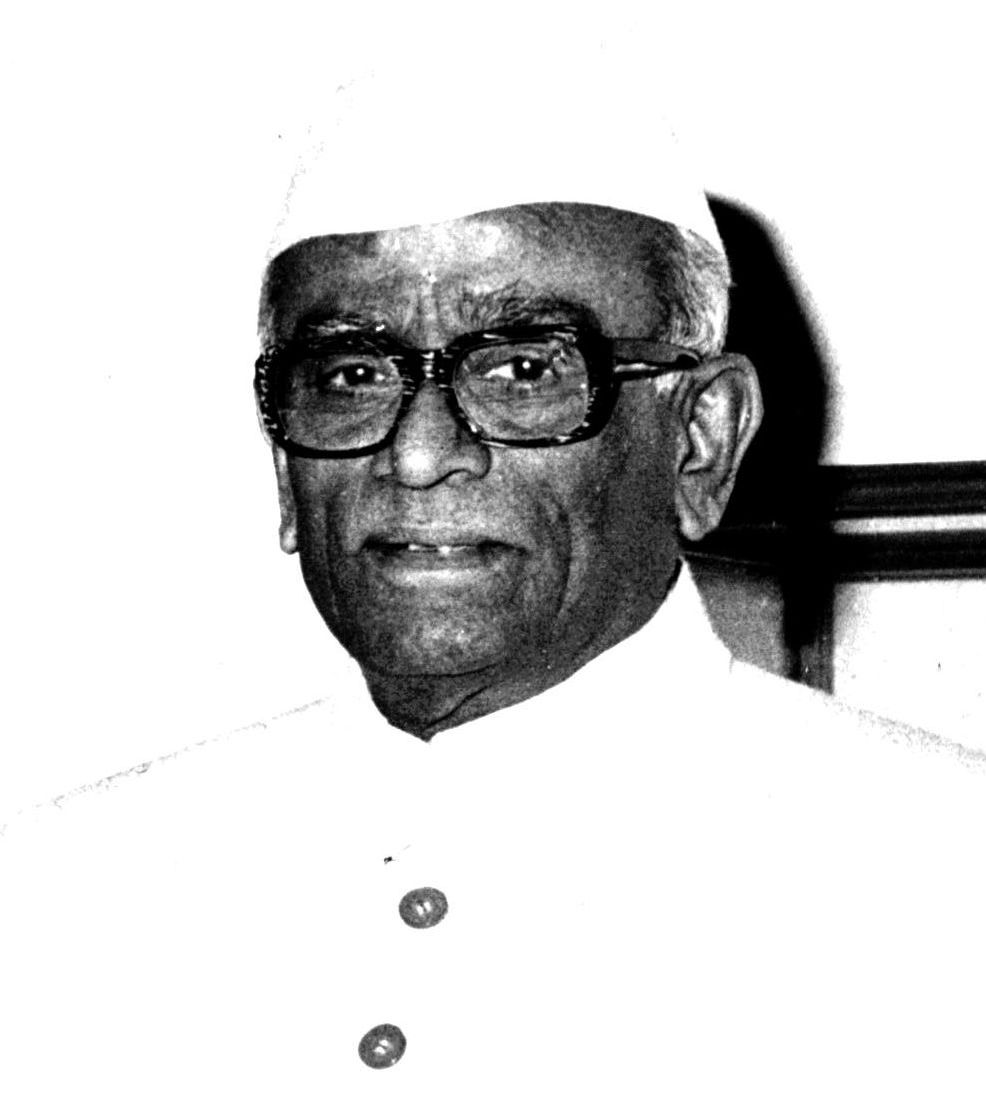
| | First party | Second party |
|---|---|---|
| Leader | Jalagam Vengala Rao | Neelam Sanjiva Reddy |
| Party | INC(R) | JP |
| Alliance | Congress alliance | Janata alliance |
| Leader's seat | Did not contest | Nandyala |
| Last election | 28 | New |
| Seats won | 41 | 1 |
| Seat change | ▲13 | New |
| Popular vote | 9,582,708 | 5,400,643 |
| Percentage | 57.36% | 32.33% |
| Swing | ▲1.63% | New |
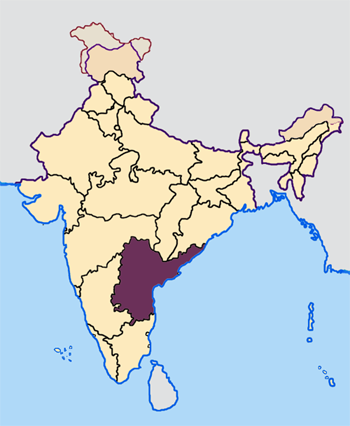
- Andhra Pradesh
Prime Minister before election
Indira Gandhi
INC
Prime Minister after election
Morarji Desai
JP

The 1977 Indian general election in Andhra Pradesh were held for 42 seats in the state. The result was a landslide victory for the Indian National Congress (R) which won 41 out of 42 seats.

The 1977 Lok Sabha election was held after the Emergency, a period of internal crackdown imposed by Prime Minister Indira Gandhi. The election resulted in a heavy defeat for the Indian National Congress (R), with Indira Gandhi herself losing her seat in Rae Bareli and her son Sanjay Gandhi losing in Amethi. Morarji Desai of the Janata Party took office as the first non Congress Prime Minister on 24 March 1977.

In North India, the Congress (R) was virtually wiped out, while in stark contrast, it won almost all seats in the South, particularly in Andhra Pradesh. The newly formed Bharatiya Lok Dal – later renamed the Janata Party – managed to win only a single seat in Nandyal, where former Chief Minister Neelam Sanjiva Reddy emerged victorious, though the party finished as runner-up in all other constituencies.

Following the election, Neelam Sanjiva Reddy was elected Speaker of the Lok Sabha on 26 March 1977. However, he resigned from the post within a short time – on 13 July 1977 – and went on to become the President of India, serving from 25 July 1977 to 25 July 1982.

== List of Candidates ==
| Constituency | | | | | |
| Constituency | | BLD+ | | INC | |
| 1 | Srikakulam | BLD | Gouthu Latchanna | INC | Rajgopalarao Boddepalli |
| 2 | Parvathipuram (ST) | BLD | Satya Prasad Thatraj Veeravara Thodarmal | INC | Vyrichearla Kishore Chandra Suryanarayana Deo |
| 3 | Bobbili | BLD | Peesapati Pundarikaksha Chari | INC | Pusapati Vijayrama Gajapathi Raju |
| 4 | Visakhapatnam | BLD | Tenneti Viswanathan | INC | Dronamraju Satyanarayana |
| 5 | Bhadrachalam (ST) | BLD | P. Vani Ramanarao | INC | Radha Bai Ananda Rao |
| 6 | Anakapalli | BLD | Chalapathi Rao P. V. | INC | Appalanaidu S. R. A. S. |
| 7 | Kakinada | BLD | Vaddi Mutyalaro | INC | Sanjeevi Rao M. S. |
| 8 | Rajahmundry | BLD | Manthena Venkata Surya Subbaraju | INC | Pattabhirama Rao S. B. P. |
| 9 | Amalapuram (SC) | BLD | B. V. Ramanayya | INC | Kusuma Krishna Murty |
| 10 | Narasapur | CPI(M) | Uddaraju Ramam | INC | Alluri Subhash Chandra Bose |
| 11 | Eluru | BLD | Krishna Murthy Garapati | INC | Kommareddy Suryanarayana |
| 12 | Machilipatnam | BLD | Vadde Sobhanadreswara Rao | INC | Ankineedu Maganti |
| 13 | Vijayawada | BLD | Gottipati Murali Mohan | INC | Godey Murahari |
| 14 | Tenali | CPI(M) | Gunturu Bapanaiah | INC | Meduri Nageswara Rao |
| 15 | Guntur | BLD | Kasaraneini Sadasiva Rao | INC | Kotha Raghuramaiah |
| 16 | Bapatla | BLD | Jagarlamudi Chandramouli | INC | Ankineedu Prasada Rao Pamulapati |
| 17 | Narasaraopet | BLD | Illuri Kotireddy | INC | Brahmananda Reddy Kasu |
| 18 | Ongole | BLD | Muppavarapu Venkaiah (Venkaiah Naidu) | INC | Puli Venkata Reddy |
| 19 | Nellore (SC) | CPI(M) | Prappancha Bhanuraju Thummalagunta | INC | Kamakshaiah Doddavarapu |
| 20 | Tirupati (SC) | BLD | Allam Krishnaiah | INC | Balakrishnaiah Tambura |
| 21 | Chittoor | BLD | N. P. Changalraya Naidu | INC | P. Rajagopal Naidu |
| 22 | Rajampet | BLD | P. Thimma Reddy | INC | Pothuraju Parthasarathi |
| 23 | Cuddapah | BLD | Vutukuru Rami Reddy | INC | Kandala Obul Reddy |
| 24 | Hindupur | BLD | K. Ramachandra Reddy | INC | P. Bayapa Reddy |
| 25 | Anantapur | BLD | D. Narayanaswamy | INC | Darur Pullaiah |
| 26 | Kurnool | BLD | Somappa | INC | K. Vijaya Bhaskara Reddy |
| 27 | Nandyal | BLD | Neelam Sanjeeva Reddy | INC | Pendakanti Venkata Subbaiah |
| 28 | Nagarkurnool (SC) | BLD | Puttapaga Padhakrishna | INC | Mailala Bheeshma Dev |
| 29 | Mahabubnagar | BLD | D. K. Satya Reddy | INC | J. Rameshwara Rao |
| 30 | Hyderabad | BLD | Mir Ahmed Ali Khan | INC | K. S. Narayana |
| 31 | Secunderabad | BLD | T. Laxmi Kantamma | INC | M. M. Hashim |
| 32 | Siddipet (SC) | BLD | T. N. Sadalakshmi | INC | G. Venkataswamy |
| 33 | Medak | BLD | Narasimba Reddy | INC | Mallikarjun |
| 34 | Nizamabad | BLD | Gangareddy | INC | Mudaganti Ram Gopal Reddy |
| 35 | Adilabad | BLD | Gopidi Ganga Reddy | INC | G. Narsimha Reddy |
| 36 | Peddapalli (SC) | BLD | Bangaru Lakshman | INC | V. Tulsiram |
| 37 | Karimnagar | BLD | Juvvadi Gautama Rao | INC | M. Satyanarayan Rao |
| 38 | Hanamkonda | BLD | P. Janardhan Reddy | INC | P. V. Narasimha Rao |
| 39 | Warangal | BLD | Jangareddy Chandabatla | INC | S. B. Giri |
| 40 | Khammam | CPI(M) | Yalamanchili Radha Krushna Murthy | INC | Jalagam Kondala Rao |
| 41 | Nalgonda | BLD | Marepalli Jagan Mohan Reddy | INC | Mohd. Abdul Lateef |
| 42 | Miryalguda | CPI(M) | Bhimireddi Narasimha Reddy | INC | G. S. Reddy |

== Voting and results ==
=== Results by Party ===
| Party Name | Popular vote | | | Seats | | |
| Party Name | Votes | % | ±pp | Contested | Won | +/− |
|---|---|---|---|---|---|---|
| INC | 95,82,708 | 57.36 | ▲1.63 | 42 | 41 | ▲13 |
| BLD | 54,00,643 | 32.33 | New | 37 | 1 | ▲1 |
| CPI(M) | 7,86,719 | 4.71 | ▲1.89 | 6 | 0 | ▼1 |
| CPI | 4,46,044 | 2.67 | ▼3.27 | 10 | 0 | ▼1 |
| Others | 18,991 | 0.11 | Steady | 3 | 0 | Steady |
| IND | 4,70,018 | 2.81 | ▼5.40 | 67 | 0 | ▼1 |
| Total | 1,67,05,123 | 100% | - | 165 | 42 | - |

== List of MPs won ==
| Constituency | | Winner | | | | Runner Up | | | | Margin | % |
| # | Name | Candidate | Party | Votes | % | Candidate | Party | Votes | % | Margin | % |
|---|---|---|---|---|---|---|---|---|---|---|---|
| 1 | Srikakulam | Rajgopalarao Boddepalli | INC | 187,125 | 49.12 | Gouthu Latchanna | BLD | 178,391 | 46.83 | 8,734 | 2.29 |
| 2 | Parvathipuram (ST) | Kishore Chandra Deo | INC | 174,454 | 55.00 | Satya Prasad Thatraj | BLD | 142,710 | 45.00 | 31,744 | 10.00 |
| 3 | Bobbili | Pusapati Vijayarama Gajapathi Raju | INC | 171,095 | 51.75 | Peesapati Pundarikaksha Chari | BLD | 119,507 | 36.15 | 51,588 | 15.60 |
| 4 | Visakhapatnam | Dronamraju Satyanarayana | INC | 171,657 | 51.00 | Tenneti Viswanathan | BLD | 128,828 | 38.28 | 42,829 | 12.72 |
| 5 | Bhadrachalam (ST) | Radha Bai Ananda Rao | INC | 155,198 | 59.91 | P. Vani Ramanarao | BLD | 59,230 | 22.86 | 95,968 | 37.05 |
| 6 | Anakapalli | Appalanaidu S. R. A. S. | INC | 199,228 | 54.30 | Chalapathi Rao P. V. | BLD | 163,292 | 44.51 | 35,936 | 9.79 |
| 7 | Kakinada | Sanjeevirao M. S. | INC | 269,017 | 61.89 | Vaddi Mutyalarao | BLD | 145,749 | 33.53 | 123,268 | 28.36 |
| 8 | Rajahmundry | Pattabhirama Rao S. B. P. | INC | 292,323 | 61.07 | Manthena Venkata Surya | BLD | 175,564 | 36.68 | 116,759 | 24.39 |
| 9 | Amalapuram (SC) | Kusuma Krishna Murty | INC | 271,982 | 64.68 | B. V. Ramanayya | BLD | 135,993 | 32.34 | 135,989 | 32.34 |
| 10 | Narasapur | Alluri Subhash Chandra Bose | INC | 256,519 | 55.65 | Uddaraju Ramam | CPI(M) | 142,162 | 30.84 | 114,357 | 24.81 |
| 11 | Eluru | Kommareddy Suryanarayana | INC | 290,410 | 63.62 | Krishna Murthy Garapati | BLD | 156,377 | 34.25 | 134,033 | 29.37 |
| 12 | Machilipatnam | Ankineedu Maganti | INC | 262,551 | 57.48 | Vadde Sobhanadreswara Rao | BLD | 185,622 | 40.64 | 76,929 | 16.84 |
| 13 | Vijayawada | Godey Murahari | INC | 239,733 | 52.78 | Gottipati Murali Mohan | BLD | 119,696 | 26.35 | 120,037 | 26.43 |
| 14 | Tenali | Meduri Nageswara Rao | INC | 244,928 | 55.76 | Gunturu Bapanaiah | CPI(M) | 187,191 | 42.62 | 57,737 | 13.14 |
| 15 | Guntur | Kotha Raghuramaiah | INC | 290,914 | 57.43 | Kasaraneini Sadasiva Rao | BLD | 205,385 | 40.54 | 85,529 | 16.89 |
| 16 | Bapatla | Ankineedu Prasada Rao Pamulapati | INC | 253,438 | 53.84 | Jagarlamudi Chandramouli | BLD | 210,492 | 44.72 | 42,946 | 9.12 |
| 17 | Narasaraopet | Brahmananda Reddy Kasu | INC | 246,146 | 58.10 | Illuri Kotireddy | BLD | 158,075 | 37.31 | 88,071 | 20.79 |
| 18 | Ongole | Puli Venkata Reddy | INC | 252,206 | 55.97 | Venkaiah Naidu | BLD | 162,881 | 36.14 | 89,325 | 19.83 |
| 19 | Nellore (SC) | Kamakshaiah Doddavarapu | INC | 272,184 | 66.14 | Prappancha Bhanuraju | CPI(M) | 129,404 | 31.44 | 142,780 | 34.70 |
| 20 | Tirupathi (SC) | Balakrishnaiah Tambura | INC | 240,394 | 54.56 | Allam Krishnaiah | BLD | 200,214 | 45.44 | 40,180 | 9.12 |
| 21 | Chittoor | P. Rajagopal Naidu | INC | 229,252 | 49.98 | N. P. Changalraya Naidu | BLD | 218,805 | 47.70 | 10,447 | 2.28 |
| 22 | Rajampet | Pothuraju Parthasarathi | INC | 233,844 | 54.58 | P. Thimma Reddy | BLD | 179,293 | 41.85 | 54,551 | 12.73 |
| 23 | Cuddapah | Kandala Obul Reddy | INC | 232,351 | 48.84 | Vutukuru Rami Reddy | BLD | 224,789 | 47.25 | 7,562 | 1.59 |
| 24 | Hindupur | P. Bayapa Reddy | INC | 236,797 | 60.76 | K. Ramachandra Reddy | BLD | 146,764 | 37.66 | 90,033 | 23.10 |
| 25 | Anantapur | Darur Pullaiah | INC | 215,279 | 55.43 | D. Narayanaswamy | BLD | 173,071 | 44.57 | 42,208 | 10.86 |
| 26 | Kurnool | Kotla Vijaya Bhaskara Reddy | INC | 270,741 | 75.69 | Somappa | BLD | 71,385 | 19.96 | 199,356 | 55.73 |
| 27 | Nandyal | Neelam Sanjeeva Reddy | BLD | 258,147 | 53.19 | Pendakanti Venkata Subbaiah | INC | 222,404 | 45.83 | 35,743 | 7.36 |
| 28 | Nagarkurnool (SC) | Mailala Bheeshma Dev | INC | 238,388 | 67.34 | Puttapaga Padhakrishna | BLD | 115,625 | 32.66 | 122,763 | 34.68 |
| 29 | Mahbubnagar | J. Rameshwara Rao | INC | 216,455 | 62.98 | D. K. Satya Reddy | BLD | 121,966 | 35.49 | 94,489 | 27.49 |
| 30 | Hyderabad | K. S. Narayana | INC | 156,295 | 46.00 | Sultan Salahuddin Owaisi | IND | 91,227 | 26.85 | 65,068 | 19.15 |
| 31 | Secunderabad | M. M. Hashim | INC | 160,230 | 48.62 | T. Laxmi Kantamma | BLD | 156,383 | 47.46 | 3,847 | 1.16 |
| 32 | Siddipet (SC) | G. Venkataswamy | INC | 232,377 | 64.21 | T. N. Sadalakshmi | BLD | 129,507 | 35.79 | 102,870 | 28.42 |
| 33 | Medak | Mallikarjun | INC | 239,813 | 67.00 | Narasimba Reddy | BLD | 96,303 | 26.91 | 143,510 | 40.09 |
| 34 | Nizamabad | Mudaganti Ram Gopal Reddy | INC | 252,291 | 70.66 | Gangareddy | BLD | 92,898 | 26.02 | 159,393 | 44.64 |
| 35 | Adilabad | G. Narsimha Reddy | INC | 167,410 | 57.47 | Gopidi Ganga Reddy | BLD | 96,244 | 33.04 | 71,166 | 24.43 |
| 36 | Peddapalli (SC) | V. Tulsiram | INC | 209,187 | 65.40 | Bangaru Lakshman | BLD | 104,110 | 32.55 | 105,077 | 32.85 |
| 37 | Karimnagar | M. Satyanarayana Rao | INC | 210,349 | 58.83 | Juvvadi Gautma Rao | BLD | 96,301 | 26.93 | 114,048 | 31.90 |
| 38 | Hanamkonda | P. V. Narasimha Rao | INC | 231,593 | 59.32 | P. Janardhan Reddy | BLD | 153,910 | 39.43 | 77,683 | 19.89 |
| 39 | Warangal | S. B. Giri | INC | 251,211 | 65.49 | Jangareddy Chandabatla | BLD | 128,589 | 33.52 | 122,622 | 31.97 |
| 40 | Khammam | Jalagam Kondala Rao | INC | 208,617 | 51.30 | Yalamanchili Radha Krushna Murthy | CPI(M) | 122,628 | 30.16 | 85,989 | 21.14 |
| 41 | Nalgonda | Mohd. Abdul Lateef | INC | 208,892 | 53.37 | Marepalli Jagan Mohan Reddy | BLD | 101,858 | 26.03 | 107,034 | 27.34 |
| 42 | Miryalguda | G. S. Reddy | INC | 217,430 | 49.40 | Bhimireddi Narasimha Reddy | CPI(M) | 167,751 | 38.11 | 49,679 | 11.29 |

== See also ==
- Elections in Andhra Pradesh
