= 1967 Indian general election in Andhra Pradesh =

1967 Indian general elections in Andhra Pradesh

- November 1967

41 seats
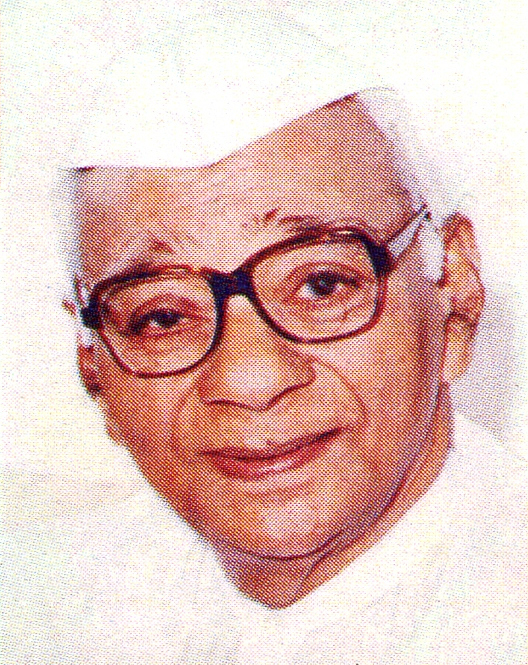

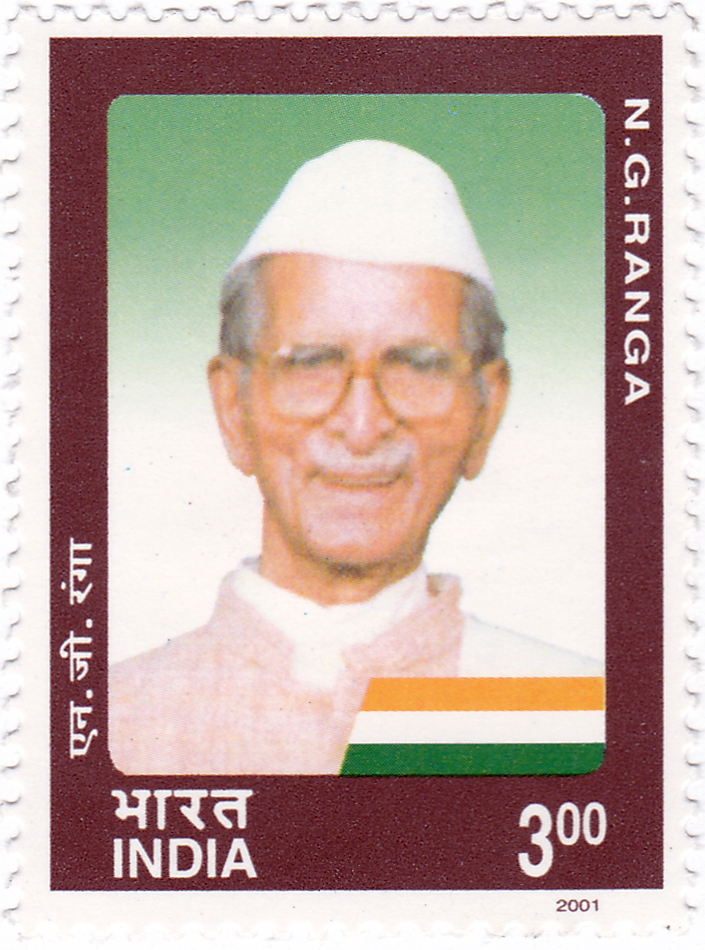
	First party	Second party
Leader	Kasu Brahmananda Reddy	N.G.Ranga
Party	INC	SWA
Alliance	Congress alliance	Nonpartisan
Leader's seat	None	Srikakulam
Last election	34	1
Seats won	35	3
Seat change	▲1	▲2
Popular vote	6,354,959	1,865,892
Percentage	46.82%	13.75%
Swing	▼1.14%
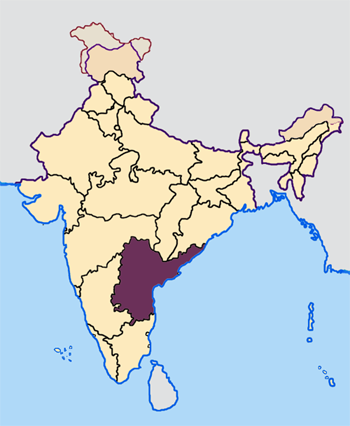
- Andhra Pradesh
Prime Minister before election
Indira Gandhi
INC
Prime Minister after election
Indira Gandhi
INC

The 1967 Indian general election in Andhra Pradesh were held for 41 seats in the state. The result was a victory for the Indian National Congress which won 35 out of 41 seats.

== Voting and results ==
Party Name	Popular vote			Seats		
Party Name	Votes	%	±pp	Contested	Won	+/−
INC	63,54,959	46.82	▼1.14	41	35	▲1
SWP	18,65,892	13.75	▼1.16	19	3	▲2
CPI	17,13,585	12.62	▼8.42	22	1	▼6
CPI(M)	8,41,123	6.20	Steady	9	0	Steady
BJS	1,35,615	1.00	▼0.17	4	0	Steady
RPI	68,456	0.50	▼0.46	2	0	Steady
SSP	56,896	0.42	Steady	3	0	Steady
PSP	23,046	0.17	▲0.10	1	0	Steady
IND	25,14,433	18.52	▲4.63	63	2	▲1
Total	1,35,74,005	100%	-	164	41	-

== Members elected ==
Constituency		Winner				Runner Up				Margin	%
#	Name	Candidate	Party	Votes	%	Candidate	Party	Votes	%	Margin	%
1	Srikakulam	G. Latchanna	SWA	189,771	56.37	B. Rajagopalrao	INC	129,413	38.44	60,358	17.93
2	Parvathipuram (ST)	V. N. Rao	SWA	161,009	56.21	B. Satyanarayana	INC	125,429	43.79	35,580	12.42
3	Bobbili	K. N. Rao	INC	146,553	44.29	S. Subbinaidu	IND	71,356	21.57	75,197	22.72
4	Visakhapatnam	T. Viswanatham	IND	136,766	42.04	P. Venkatrao	INC	102,693	31.57	34,073	10.47
5	Bhadrachalam (ST)	B. K. Radhabai	INC	121,630	51.96	K. P. Santharaju	CPI(M)	54,395	23.24	67,235	28.72
6	Anakapalli	M. Suryanarayanamurthy	INC	165,121	45.25	V. V. Ramana	SWA	162,097	44.42	3,024	0.83
7	Kakinada	T. R. Mosaliganti	INC	168,647	44.35	P. S. Sarma	CPI	138,647	36.46	30,000	7.89
8	Rajahmundry	D. S. Raju	INC	227,154	57.32	N. R. Motha	IND	92,241	23.28	134,913	34.04
9	Amalapuram (SC)	S. Bayya	INC	141,722	41.26	D. Eda	CPI	78,456	22.84	63,266	18.42
10	Narasapur	D. Balaramarajau	INC	185,274	44.55	U. Raman	CPI(M)	148,721	35.76	36,553	8.79
11	Eluru	K. Suryanarayan	INC	163,360	41.83	V. Vimaludevi	CPI	161,407	41.33	1,953	0.50
12	Gudivada	M. Ankineedu	INC	139,238	35.41	Y. Nagabhushanam	CPI(M)	99,040	25.19	40,198	10.22
14	Machilipatnam	Y. A. Arasad	INC	199,885	52.06	M. H. Rao	CPI(M)	122,293	31.85	77,592	20.21
15	Ongole	K. Jaggaiah	INC	212,071	53.93	M. Narayanaswamy	CPI(M)	131,613	33.47	80,458	20.46
16	Guntur	Kotha Raghuramaiah	INC	237,225	59.29	N. V. Laxminarasimharao	IND	120,193	30.04	117,032	29.25
17	Narasaraopet	M. Sudarsanam	INC	185,963	46.60	T. K. Chowdary	SWA	121,532	30.45	64,431	16.15
18	Kavali	R. D. Reddy	INC	208,098	53.85	D. K. Choudary	SWA	159,944	41.39	48,154	12.46
19	Nellore (SC)	B. Anjanappa	INC	130,981	32.96	E. V. Chinnaiah	IND	113,998	28.69	16,983	4.27
20	Tirupathi (SC)	C. Dass	INC	146,238	38.56	C. V. S. Moorthy	SWA	139,469	36.77	6,769	1.79
21	Chittoor	N. P. C. Naidu	INC	186,594	54.00	N. G. Ranga	SWA	158,931	46.00	27,663	8.00
22	Rajampet	P. Parthasarathy	INC	189,874	52.62	C. L. N. Reddy	SWA	123,325	34.18	66,549	18.44
23	Cuddapah	Y. E. Reddy	CPI	191,736	49.25	K. Ramasubbamma	INC	154,017	39.56	37,719	9.69
24	Hindupur	S. R. Neelam	INC	144,438	47.13	K. V. S. Reedy	SWA	102,202	33.35	42,236	13.78
25	Anantapur	P. A. Reddy	INC	135,685	40.59	I. Sadasivan	CPI	73,071	21.86	62,614	18.73
26	Kurnool	Y. G. Linganagowda	SWA	160,080	48.82	D. Sanjeevayya	INC	149,297	45.53	10,783	3.29
27	Nandyal	P. V. Subbaiah	INC	262,256	66.22	S. Reddy	CPI	93,431	23.59	168,825	42.63
28	Nagarkurnool (SC)	J. B. M. Rao	INC	129,636	47.42	Y. Danayya	IND	89,977	32.91	39,659	14.51
29	Mahbubnagar	J. R. Rao	INC	177,320	58.92	M. Kistayya	IND	87,503	29.08	89,817	29.84
30	Hyderabad	G. S. Melkote	INC	115,709	45.23	V. R. Rao	IND	70,124	27.41	45,585	17.82
31	Secunderabad	B. A. Mirza	INC	119,346	50.83	A. Lakshminarayana	IND	36,814	15.68	82,532	35.15
32	Siddipet (SC)	G. Venkatswamy	INC	161,273	52.05	A. R. Devraj	CPI	63,443	20.48	97,830	31.57
33	Medak	S. L. Bai	INC	127,917	45.12	K. Ramiah	IND	43,252	15.26	84,665	29.86
34	Nizamabad	M. N. Reddy	IND	149,632	53.43	H. C. Heda	INC	79,387	28.35	70,245	25.08
35	Adilabad	P. G. Reddy	INC	160,494	59.52	D. S. Rao	CPI	86,244	31.98	74,250	27.54
36	Peddapalli (SC)	M. R. Krishna	INC	155,550	51.66	Palanivelu	IND	83,355	27.68	72,195	23.98
37	Karimnagar	J. R. Rao	INC	87,933	32.14	V. Iswaraiah	IND	85,757	31.35	2,176	0.79
38	Warangal	R. S. Reddy	INC	146,715	42.67	L. S. Raju	BJS	76,770	22.33	69,945	20.34
39	Khammam	T. Lakshmikantamma	INC	200,534	53.12	M. K. Rao	CPI(M)	89,206	23.63	111,328	29.49
40	Nalgonda	M. Y. Salim	INC	169,953	54.44	B. D. Hiksham	CPI	77,675	24.88	92,278	29.56
41	Miryalguda	G. S. Reddy	INC	164,336	45.67	D. V. Rao	CPI	122,292	33.99	42,044	11.68

- Constituency 13 (Vijayawada) is excluded from this list because it indicates the winner K.L. Rao was returned uncontested or with 0 votes recorded for a contest, and no runner-up is listed

== See also ==
- Elections in Andhra Pradesh
