= Bandi Sanjay Kumar =

Indian politician (born 1971)

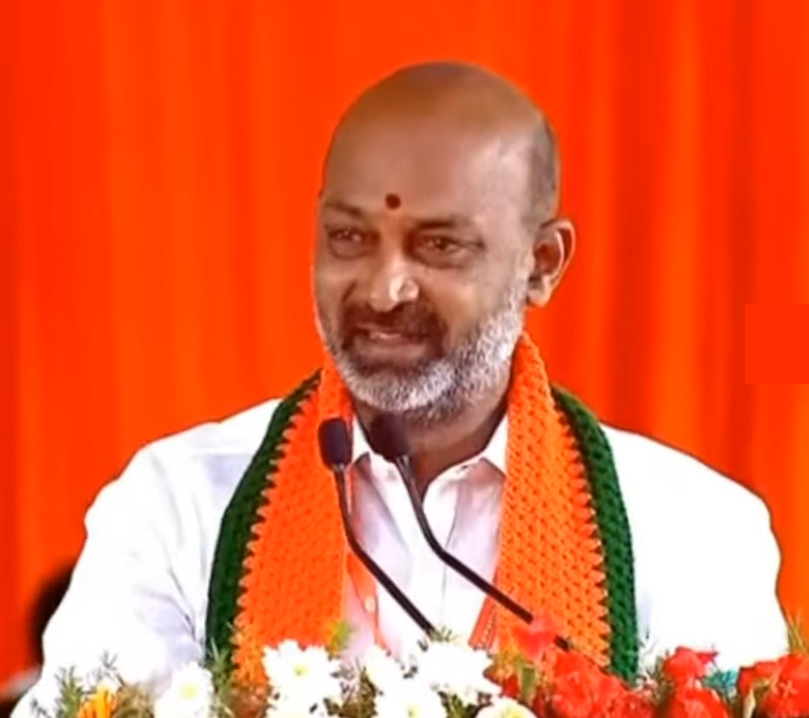
- Sanjay Kumar at a public meeting in 2022

Minister of State for Home Affairs
- Incumbent
- Assumed office 9 June 2024
- Prime Minister: Narendra Modi
- Minister: Amit Shah
- Preceded by: Nisith Pramanik

3rd President of Bharatiya Janata Party Telangana
- In office 11 March 2020 – 4 July 2023
- Preceded by: K. Laxman
- Succeeded by: G. Kishan Reddy

Member of Parliament, Lok Sabha
- Incumbent
- Assumed office 23 May 2019
- Preceded by: B. Vinod Kumar
- Constituency: Karimnagar

National General Secretary of Bharatiya Janata Party
- Incumbent
- Assumed office 29 July 2023
- President: Jagat Prakash Nadda; Nitin Nabin

Personal details
- Born: 11 July 1971 (age 54) Karimnagar, Andhra Pradesh (Present-day Telangana), India
- Party: Bharatiya Janata Party
- Spouse: Aparna
- Education: MA (public admn) - (discontinued)
- Alma mater: Madurai Kamaraj University
- Profession: Business
- Website: bandisanjaybjp.in

Bandi Sanjay Kumar (born 11 July 1971) is an Indian politician who is appointed Minister of State for Home Affairs. He is a Member of the Lok Sabha, the lower house of the Parliament of India, representing the Karimnagar constituency since 2019. He is the former state president of the Bharatiya Janata Party in Telangana from 11 March 2020 to 4 July 2023. He is All India Institute of Medical Sciences, Bibinagar board member. He was named as National General Secretary on 29 July 2023 by the BJP National President.

== Early life and education ==
Bandi Sanjay Kumar was born on 11 July 1971 to B. Narsayya and B. Sakuntala. He completed his secondary schooling at Sri Saraswathi Shishumandir Unnata paathashaala, in Karimnagar, in 1986. He was also active in the Rashtriya Swayamsevak Sangh as a youth, joining the organization at the age of twelve.

== Political career ==
Kumar was involved with the Akhil Bharatiya Vidyarthi Parishad, eventually became town president and a state executive member of the organization. He also occupied leadership positions in this organization, becoming "town secretary, town president, national secretary of Kerala and incharge of Tamil Nadu." In 1996, during BJP leader LK Advani's Surat Rath Yatra, he campaigned across India for 35 days.

Kumar was elected a municipal corporator for Karimnagar's 48th division in 2005, and served in this role until his resignation in 2019, when he was elected to the Lok Sabha. He was also fielded by the BJP in 2014 and 2018 as its candidate for the state assembly elections; he contested the Karimnagar seat both times. He was, however, unsuccessful in both elections, and lost to the Bharat Rashtra Samiti's Gangula Kamalakar.

In the 2019 Indian general election, Kumar was fielded by the BJP from the Karimnagar Lok Sabha constituency. He contested against the incumbent Member of Parliament, the Bharat Rashtra Samiti's B. Vinod Kumar, and the Indian National Congress' Ponnam Prabhakar. He was elected by a margin of 89,508 votes. His election was considered something of a surprise due to the BJP's prior lack of significant strength in Telangana, as well as the fact that both his major opponents were politically well-established. With his election to the Lok Sabha, Bandi became one of four Bharatiya Janata Party MPs from Telangana, a historic first for the party.

On 4 July 2023, Kumar stepped down as Telangana party president, and on 21 July he was replaced by G. Kishan Reddy.

On July 30, 2023, Kumar was announced as National General Secretary for BJP, and on 4 August 2023 he took up the post.

He was appointed Minister of State in the Ministry of Home Affairs on 9 June 2024.

In August 2025, five farmers were trapped in the middle of the Maneru stream near Gambhiraopet in Rajanna Sircilla district while grazing cattle. Kumar contacted Defence Minister Rajnath Singh and requested immediate assistance. Following his intervention, two Indian Air Force helicopters were deployed, and the farmers were successfully airlifted to safety. The families of the rescued individuals expressed relief and gratitude.

=== Exam paper leak case ===
In April 2023, Kumar and three others were arrested on charges of being involved in the question paper leak case of Telangana State Board's class ten examinations.

On the day of his arrest, the police shared a few of the WhatsApp chats shared between accused 1 (Kumar) and accused 2 (Prashant), in the case. The Warangal Police Commissioner said : "Bandi Sanjay's phone is missing but we will retrieve WhatsApp messages and conversations very soon. They have deleted a few messages, call logs/call data, we will retrieve all those details."

On 7 April, Kumar was released on bail. In a statement on his release, he accused the police of incompetence, and demanded a judicial probe into the paper leak.

BJP national president J. P. Nadda and national general secretary Tarun Chugh said that Kumar's arrest was part of a conspiracy to defame the BJP for the SSC paper leak.

On 21 November 2025 the Telangana High Court quashed the FIR against him, saying Kumar had no direct links to the paper leak.

== Family ==
In January 2023 Kumar's son Bandi Bhageerath had multiple charges registered against him for beating up a fellow student in his college. In March 2023, the Telangana High Court issued a stay of Bandi Bhageerath's suspension from college, and the student whom he had attacked said that he had forgiven Kumar's son over the incident. He has a pending criminal case related to a crime against women.

== See also ==
- Third Modi ministry
