= 1962 Indian general election in Andhra Pradesh =

- November 1962

43 seats
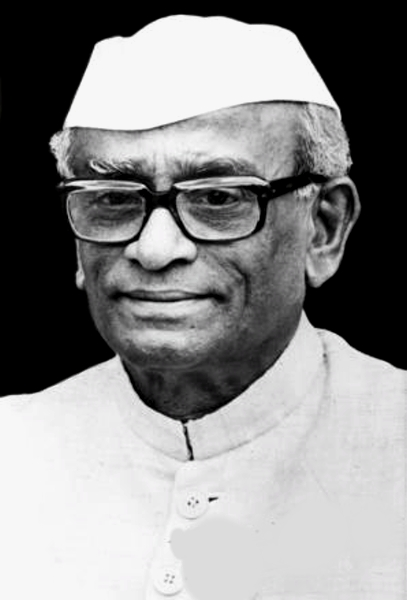

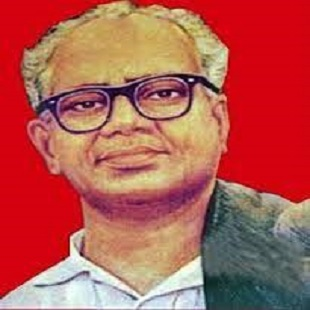
	First party	Second party
Leader	Neelam Sanjiva Reddy	Puchalapalli Sundarayya
Party	INC	CPI
Leader's seat	None	None
Last election	37	2
Seats won	34	7
Seat change	▼3	▲5
Popular vote	5,711,263	2,505,619
Percentage	47.96%	21.04%
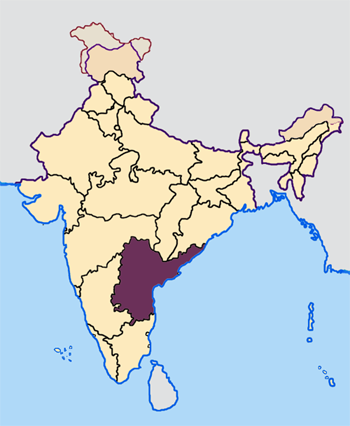
- Andhra Pradesh
Prime Minister before election
Jawaharlal Nehru
INC
Prime Minister after election
Jawaharlal Nehru
INC

The 1962 Indian general election in Andhra Pradesh were held for 43 seats in the state. The result was a victory for the Indian National Congress which won 34 out of 43 seats.

== Voting and results ==
=== Results by Party ===
Party Name	Popular vote			Seats		
Party Name	Votes	%	±pp	Contested	Won	+/−
INC	57,11,263	47.96		43	34	
CPI	25,05,619	21.04		20	7	
SWP	17,75,495	14.91		28	1	
BJS	1,39,049	1.17		8	0	
REP	1,14,872	0.96		3	0	
PSP	8,287	0.07		1	0	
IND	16,53,436	13.89		44	1	Steady
Total	1,19,08,021	100%	-	147	43	-

== Members elected ==
Constituency		Winner				Runner-up				Margin	
Constituency		Candidate	Party	Votes	%	Candidate	Party	Votes	%	Votes	%
1	Srikakulam	Boddipalli Rajagopala Row	INC	112,172	42.60	Suggu Srinivasa Reddy	SWA	80,357	30.51	31,815	12.09
2	Parvathipuram (ST)	Biddika Satyanarayana	INC	131,625	58.79	Viswasarayai Narsimha Rao	SWA	92,253	41.21	39,372	17.58
3	Cheepurupalli	Ravu Venkata Gopalakrishna Ranga Rao	INC	135,315	52.02	Kerri Narayanarao	SWA	110,351	42.43	24,964	9.59
4	Visakhapatnam	Vijaya Ananada	INC	159,423	70.01	Maddi Pattabhirama Reddy	SWA	68,281	29.99	91,142	40.02
5	Anakapalli	Missula Suryanarayanamurthy	INC	96,895	37.95	Villuri Venkataramana	SWA	80,885	31.68	16,010	6.27
6	Narsipatnam (ST)	Matcharasa Matcharaju	INC	73,518	38.09	Karam Bapanna Dora	SWA	72,171	37.40	1,347	0.69
7	Rajahmundry (ST)	Datla Satyanarayana Raju	INC	175,602	55.14	Nalla Reddi Naidu	IND	52,228	16.40	123,374	38.74
8	Kakinada	Mosalikanti Thirumala Rao	INC	143,575	45.39	Chelikani Venkata Rama Rao	CPI	124,891	39.49	18,684	5.90
9	Amalapuram (SC)	Bayya Suryanarayana Murthy	INC	151,439	46.49	Keneti Mohana Rao	CPI	138,869	42.63	12,570	3.86
10	Narasapur	Datla Balaramaraju	INC	181,878	50.04	Uddarraju Ramam	CPI	167,209	46.00	14,669	4.04
11	Eluru	Viramachaneni Vimaladevi	CPI	159,379	47.44	Kumari Mothey Vedakumari	INC	157,910	47.00	1,469	0.44
12	Gudivada	Manganti Ankineedu	INC	186,452	48.96	Yarlagadda Venkatakrishnarao	CPI	169,718	44.57	16,734	4.39
13	Vijayawada	K. L. Rao	INC	177,794	50.97	Nanduri Durga Mallikharjuna Prasada Rao	CPI	154,811	44.38	22,983	6.59
14	Machilipatnam	Mandali Venkataswamy	IND	153,720	44.13	Mandali Venkata Krishnarao	INC	149,508	42.92	4,212	1.21
15	Tenali	Kolla Venkaiah	CPI	143,396	40.33	Nadimpalli Venkatalakshmi Narasimha Rao	INC	119,469	33.60	23,927	6.73
16	Guntur	Kotha Raghuramaiah	INC	204,533	57.52	Sastla Venkata Lakshminarasimham	IND	104,591	29.42	99,942	28.10
17	Ongole	Madala Narayanaswamy	CPI	127,120	39.69	T. S. Paulus	INC	124,777	38.95	2,343	0.74
18	Markapur	Gujjula Yellamanda Reddy	CPI	146,909	49.03	Chegireddy Balireddy	INC	120,082	40.08	26,827	8.95
19	Kavali	Bezwada Gopala Reddy	INC	167,031	51.95	Bezwada Ramachandra Reddy	SWA	139,068	43.26	27,963	8.69
20	Nellore (SC)	B. Anjanappa	INC	165,206	49.16	Meriga Ramakrishnaiah	SWA	93,301	27.76	71,905	21.40
21	Tirupathi (SC)	C. Dass	INC	119,539	53.84	C. V. Siddaiah Murthy	SWA	102,491	46.16	17,048	7.68
22	Chittoor	Madabhusi Ananthasayanam Ayyangar	INC	130,026	45.27	C. V. L. Narayan	SWA	106,062	36.93	23,964	8.34
23	Rajampet	C. L. Narasimha Reddy	SWA	155,017	52.95	T. N. Viswanatha Reddy	INC	137,752	47.05	17,265	5.90
24	Cuddapah	Yeddula Eswara Reddy	CPI	158,877	44.02	Vuntukuru Rami Reddy	INC	138,010	38.23	20,867	5.79
25	Anantapur	Osman Ali Khan	INC	120,826	41.61	I. Sadasivan	CPI	95,958	33.04	24,868	8.57
26	Hindupur	K. V. Ramakrishna Reddy	INC	89,521	35.67	Erukalappa	IND	60,479	24.10	29,042	11.57
27	Adoni	Pendekanti Venkatasubbaiah	INC	136,513	56.88	Nayakanti Sankara Reddy	SWA	103,491	43.12	33,022	13.76
28	Kurnool	Yasoda Reddy	INC	121,999	42.66	Mukkamala Venkatasubba Reddy	IND	85,085	29.75	36,914	12.91
29	Gadwal	Janumpally Rameshwar Rao	INC	116,150	44.76	D. K. Satya Reddy	IND	100,316	38.66	15,834	6.10
30	Mahbubnagar (SC)	J. B. Mutyal Rao	INC	117,573	61.55	K. R. Veeraswamy	IND	51,253	26.83	66,320	34.72
31	Hyderabad	Gopal S. Melkote	INC	96,447	56.19	Abdul Wahed Owasi	IND	53,378	31.10	43,069	25.09
32	Secunderabad	Ahmed Mohiuddin	INC	92,459	48.16	V. Ramachandra Rao	IND	67,889	35.36	24,570	12.80
33	Vicarabad	Sangam Lakshimi Bai	INC	123,193	59.20	Ramuloo	SWA	44,093	21.19	79,100	38.01
34	Medak	P. Hanumantha Rao	INC	88,098	45.21	Molgu Jagannathreddy	IND	68,966	35.39	19,132	9.82
35	Nizamabad	H. C. Heda	INC	106,570	45.54	M. Narayana Reddy	IND	79,550	33.99	27,020	11.55
36	Adilabad	G. Narayan Reddy	INC	129,068	61.45	V. G. Dora Sami	IND	39,983	19.04	89,085	42.41
37	Karimnagar	Juvvadi Ramapathi Rao	INC	120,472	50.74	Gurram Madhava Reddy	IND	53,069	22.35	67,403	28.39
38	Peddapalli (SC)	M. R. Krishna	INC	149,561	69.53	Palanivelu	CPI	65,540	30.47	84,021	39.06
39	Warangal	Bakar Ali Mirza	INC	113,308	46.54	S. Ramanatham	CPI	112,572	46.24	736	0.30
40	Mahbubabad	Etikala Madhusudhan Rao	INC	126,100	45.36	Teegala Satyanarayana Rao	CPI	112,524	40.48	13,576	4.88
41	Khammam	T. Lakshikantamma	INC	163,806	49.78	T. B. Vittal Rao	CPI	151,746	46.11	12,060	3.67
42	Nalgonda	Ravi Narayana Reddy	CPI	159,145	55.86	Kanchinepalli Pedda Venkatarama Rao	INC	125,749	44.14	33,396	11.72
43	Miryalguda (SC)	Laxmi Dass	CPI	140,884	50.53	Vaddapalli Kasiram	INC	114,319	41.00	26,565	9.53

== See also ==
- Elections in Andhra Pradesh
