= Meneni Satyanarayana Rao =

Indian politician (1933–2021)

Personal details
- Born: 23 September 1933
- Died: 26 April 2021 (aged 87)

Meneni Satyanarayana Rao (23 September 1933 – 26 April 2021) was an Indian politician from Andhra Pradesh. He was a former member of the Andhra Pradesh Legislative Assembly from the Karimnagar Assembly constieuncy in 2014 and was a three time Member of the Parliament from the Karimnagar Lok Sabha constituency in 1971, 1977 and 1980. He served as the general secretary of the All India Congress Committee and as a minister in the YS Rajasekhar Reddy government.

== Early life ==
Rao was born on 23 September 1933 in Vedhira village, Ramagundam mandal, Karimnagar district, Andhra Pradesh. He had two daughters and two sons. He actively took part in the Telangana movement from 1969 to 1971.

== Career ==
Rao was first elected as a Member of the Parliament from the Karimnagar Lok Sabha constituency in the 1971 Indian General election in Andhra Pradesh representing the Telangana Praja Samithi (TPS). He polled 1,19,869 votes and defeated his nearest rival, Vedire Narsimha Reddy of the Indian National Congress by 5,398 votes. He retained the seat for the next two terms in 1977 and 1980 elections winning on a Congress ticket. In the 1977 Indian general election in Andhra Pradesh he polled, 2,10,349 votes and defeated his nearest rival, Juvvadi Gautma Rao of Bharatiya Lok Dal, by 1,14,048 votes. He was elected for a third consecutive term winning the 1980 Indian general election in Andhra Pradesh representing the Indian National Congress. In 1980, he garnered 2,01,777 votes and beat his closest opponent, Chennamaneni Vidya Sagar Rao of the Janata Party (JNP), by 1,56,328 votes.

=== Death ===
Rao died on 26 April 2021 due to COVID-19 related complications at NIMS Hospital, Hyderabad.
