= Ponnam Prabhakar =

Indian politician

Ponnam Prabhakar Goud
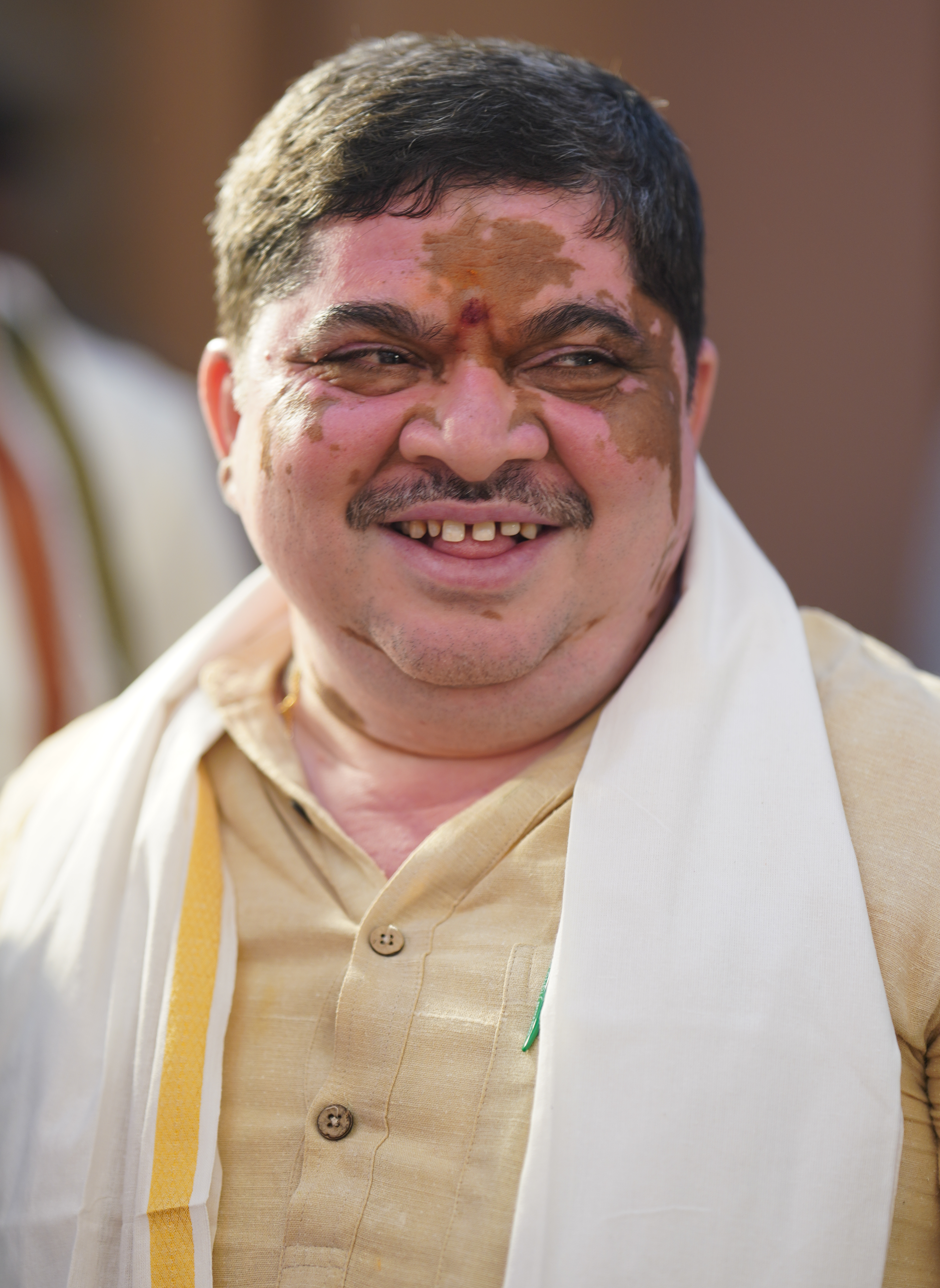

Minister for Transport & BC Welfare Government of Telangana
- Incumbent
- Assumed office 7 December 2023
- Governor: Tamilisai Soundararajan (2023-2024); C.P. Radhakrishnan (Additional charge) (2024); Jishnu Dev Varma (2024-2026); Shiv Pratap Shukla (2026–present)
- Chief Minister: Revanth Reddy
- Department and ministry: Transport; B.C Welfare
- Preceded by: Gangula Kamalakar (B.C Welfare); Puvvada Ajay Kumar (Transport)

Member of Telangana Legislative Assembly
- Incumbent
- Assumed office 3 December 2023
- Preceded by: Vodithela Sathish Kumar
- Constituency: Husnabad

Member of Parliament, Lok Sabha
- In office 16 May 2009 – 17 May 2014
- Preceded by: K. Chandra Shakher Rao
- Succeeded by: B. Vinod Kumar
- Constituency: Karimnagar

Personal details
- Born: 8 May 1967 (age 59) Karimnagar, Telangana
- Party: INC
- Spouse: Manjula (m.21 April 2000)
- Children: Two children, Pruthvi, Pranav
- Parent(s): Sathaiah Goud, Mallamma

Ponnam Prabhakar Goud (born 8 May 1967) is an Indian politician and Currently Serving as Minister of Transport and BC Welfare in Telangana. Earlier he was a member of 15th Lok Sabha and worked Working President of the Telangana Pradesh Congress Committee. He belongs to the Indian National Congress and represented the Karimnagar constituency of Andhra Pradesh. He was the youngest Member of Parliament who represented Karimnagar constituency between 2009 and 2014.

Ponnam Prabhakar is also known for his activism at the time of Telangana movement and as parliamentarian who faced fierce hostility from fellow Parliamentarians in the form of ‘pepper spray’. His followers affectionately call him as ‘Ponnam Anna’.

== Political career ==
A student leader from his college days, he became Union President of SRR Government Degree and PG College during 1987–1988. He served as district general secretary of the National Students' Union of India (NSUI) from 1987 to 1989. He was also the convenor of the District Colleges of Karimnagar from 1987 to 1988. He held the position of NSUI State Secretary from 1989 to 1991 and was followed by District President of NSUI from 1992 to 1998. He later was elected again as NSUI State President from 1999 to 2002.

He worked as General Secretary of State Youth Congress from 2002 to 2003 and then, worked as Pradesh Congress Committee Media Cell Coordinator from 2002 to 2004. He was made DCMS President and later worked as Chairman of State Markfed from 2005 to 2009. He was elected from Karimnagar as member of parliament to enter 15th Lok Sabha in 2009 on Indian National Congress (INC) ticket. He was a member of Committee on Welfare of Other Backward Classes (OBCs), Ministry of Power Consultative Committee, Ministry of Railways Consultative Committee, Committee on Provision of Computers to MPs of Lok Sabha, Committee on Chemicals and Fertilizers in parliament. He was one of the active participants in Telangana Movement and earned his reputation in the Parliament by speaking out for a separate Telangana.

After the formation of Telangana state in 2014, Ponnam Prabhakar contested the Karimnagar Lok Sabha seat and lost to BRS candidate B. Vinod Kumar. In 2018, he contested the Karimnagar Assembly seat and was defeated by TRS Candidate Gangula Kamalakar. In the 2019 he contested from Karimnagar Lok Sabha and lost to BJP candidate Bandi Sanjay Kumar.

Ponnam Prabhakar served as Telangana Pradesh Congress Committee (TPCC) working President from 2018 to 2023.

In 2023 Assembly Elections he contested from Husnabad constituency and won with a majority of 19,344 votes against BRS candidate Vodithela Sathish Kumar. Ponnam Prabhakar took oath as minister at L B Stadium in Hyderabad on 7 December 2024 and later he was assigned Transport and BC Welfare ministry on 9 December 2024 and taken charge in his office on 18 December 2024.

Ponnam Prabhakar was appointed as Hyderabad in-charge Minister on 24 December 2023.

He was appointed as State Legislative Assembly Select Committee Chairman on 6 July 2026.

== Elections Contested ==
=== Lok Sabha ===
Year	Constituency	Party	Votes	%	Opponent	Opponent Party	Opponent Votes	%	Result	Margin	%
2019	Karimnagar	INC	179,258	15.62	Bandi Sanjay Kumar	BJP	498,276	43.42	Lost	-319,018	-27.80
2014	Karimnagar	INC	300,706	26.71	Boianapalli Vinod Kumar	TRS	505,783	44.93	Lost	-205,077	-18.22
2009	Karimnagar	INC	317,927	32.14	Boianapalli Vinod Kumar	TRS	267,684	27.06	Won	50,243	5.08

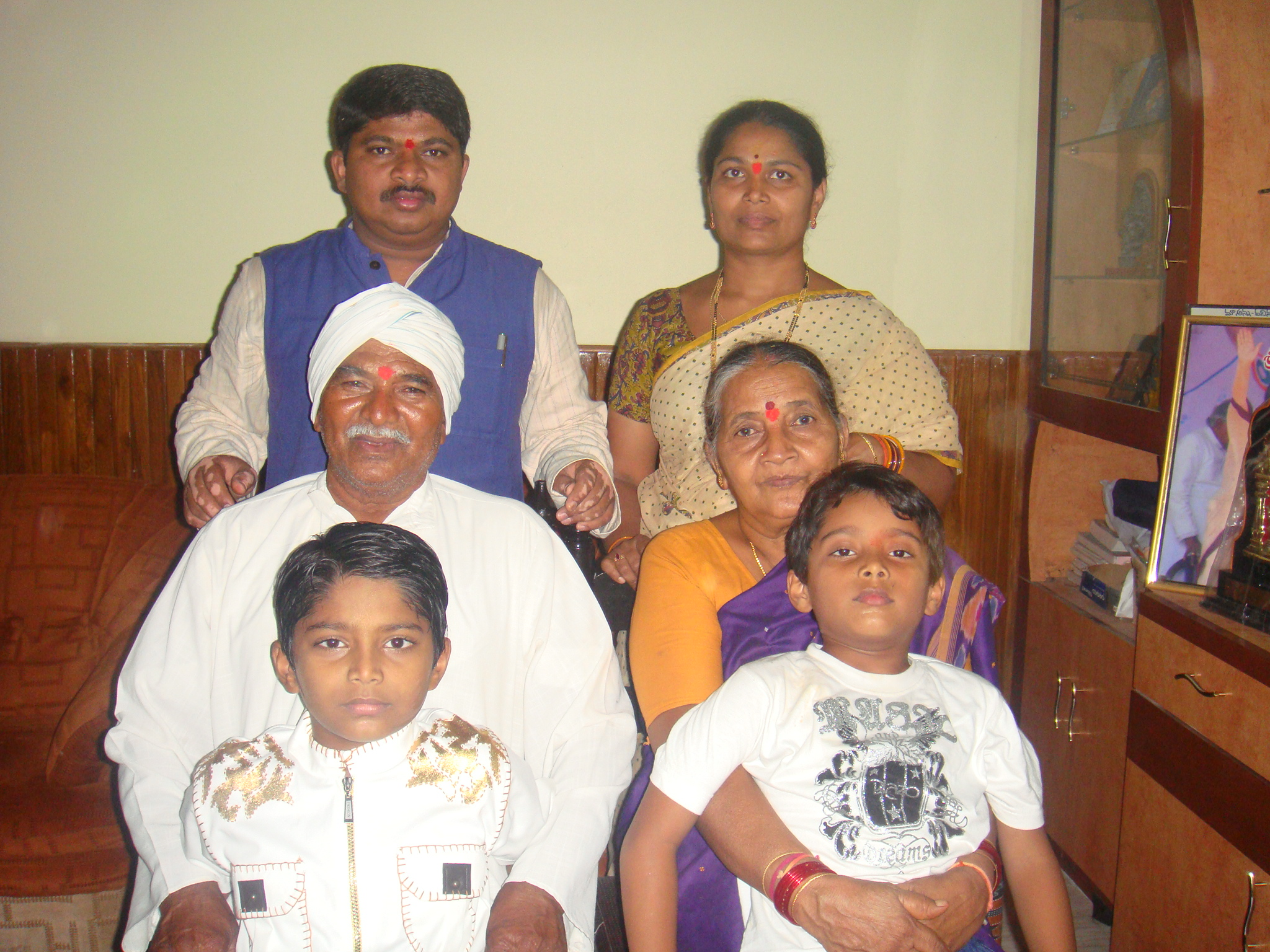
Ponnam Parbhakar with his Parents and Family in 2008

=== Telangana Legislative Assembly ===
Year	Constituency	Party	Votes	%	Opponent	Opponent Party	Opponent Votes	%	Result	Margin	%
2023	Husnabad	INC	100,955	48.84	Vodithela Sathish Kumar	BRS	81,611	39.48	Won	19,344	9.36
2018	Karimnagar	INC	39,500	19.86	Gangula Kamalakar	TRS	80,983	40.71	Lost	-41,483	-20.85

Preceded by K. Chandra Shakher Rao	Member of Parliament from Karimnagar; 2009 – 2014
