= B. Vinod Kumar =

Indian politician

Boianapalli Vinod Kumar
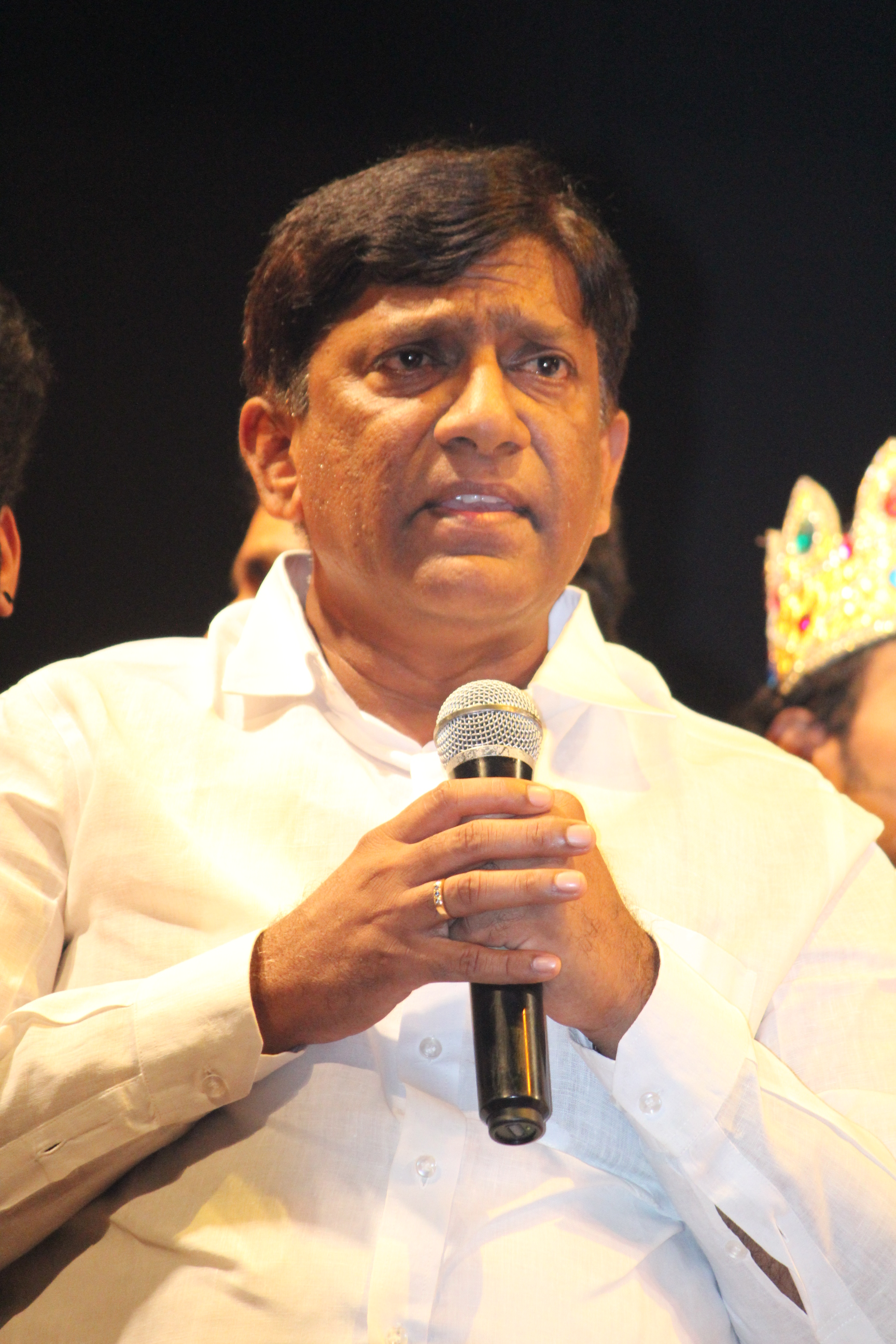

Member of Parliament, Lok Sabha
- In office 16 May 2014 – 23 May 2019
- Preceded by: Ponnam Prabhakar
- Succeeded by: Bandi Sanjay Kumar
- Constituency: Karimnagar
- In office 13 May 2004 — 16 May 2009
- Preceded by: Chada Suresh Reddy
- Succeeded by: Constituency Abolished
- Constituency: Hanmakonda

Personal details
- Born: 22 July 1959 (age 67) Karimnagar,
- Party: Telangana Rashtra Samithi
- Spouse(s): Dr B Madhavi (Obstetrics&Gynecologist)
- Children: Dr B Prateek B Pranay
- Parent(s): B. Muralidher Rao (father) & B. Sugunadevi (mother)
- Education: Kakatiya University
- Profession: Advocate, Politician and Social Worker
- Committees: Standing Committee on Water Resources; Consultative Committee, Ministry of Health and Family Welfare; Joint Committee on the Right to Fair Compensation and Transparency in Land Acquisition, Rehabilitation and Resettlement (Second Amendment) Bill, 2015
- Designation: Deputy Floor Leader for TRS in Lok Sabha and Member, TRS Politburo

Boianapalli Vinod Kumar (born 22 July 1959) is an Indian politician and former Member of Parliament, he served as Vice-chairman of Telangana State Planning Board (2019-2023). He represented the Karimnagar constituency of Telangana State in the 16th Lok Sabha (2014-2019) and Hanamkonda constituency in the 14th Lok Sabha (2004-2009). He is one of the founding members of the Telangana Rashtra Samithi (TRS) party and is presently a politburo member and served as party's deputy Floor Leader in the 16th Lok Sabha.

== Early life ==
Vinod Kumar Boianapalli was born in Karimnagar, Telangana on 22 July 1959. He has a younger brother and a younger sister. His parents are B. Muralidhar Rao and B. Sugunadevi. His father was a state government employee in the revenue department in Warangal district. His paternal family is an agricultural family from Enugal village, Warangal. His maternal family is politically prominent and hails from Nagaram village, Karimnagar. Chennamaneni Rajeshwar Rao, freedom fighter and Communist party leader; Chennamaneni Hanumantha Rao, former Planning Commission member and former Chancellor of University of Hyderabad; Chennameneni Venkateshwar Rao, social worker; and Chennamaneni Vidyasagar Rao, former Governor of Maharashtra are his maternal uncles.

== Education and student politics ==
Vinod Kumar Boianapalli did his schooling from Nehru Memorial School, Desaipet village, Warangal. He completed his intermediate education from Government Junior College, Hanamakonda. He did his Bachelor's in Science in Government Kakatiya Degree College and LL.B. at the University College of Law, Kakatiya University.

Vinod Kumar joined politics at the young age of 14 when he came into contact with the left-wing All India Students Federation (AISF), which was the student wing of the Communist Party of India (CPI). He became deeply involved in student politics and rose to become a student leader. He held various office bearer posts in the AISF state and national committees and also in the university students union. During his student days he participated in various public movements and agitations in Warangal.

== Advocate profession ==
Vinod Kumar enrolled as an advocate in the year 1984. He practiced as a lawyer in Warangal district until 1998. Later, he started his practice in the Andhra Pradesh High Court at Hyderabad. He is a member of Telangana Bar Council (erstwhile Andhra Pradesh Bar Council).

== Political career ==
Vinod Kumar enrolled as a member of the Communist Party of India (CPI) in the late 1970s and held various organizational posts in the party. He was the district assistant secretary in Warangal and went on to become a member of the state council. Apart from his political activism he also participated in various people's movements, national and international seminars on world peace and was an active member of the Indo-Soviet cultural society, and All Inda Peace and Solidarity Organisation (AIPSO).

== TRS party and Telangana Movement ==
When the Telangana Movement was renewed in the late 1990s, Vinod Kumar was at the forefront. He participated in many debates, seminars and round table meetings on the backwardness of the Telangana region vis-a-vis Coastal Andhra. Together with Prof. Jayashanker and Prof. Biyyala Janardhan Rao, Kumar was instrumental in presenting a resolution in AP State CPI conference at Warangal for the development and special package to Telangana. Upon the call of K.Chandrasekhar Rao in 2000 for a separate Telangana, he along with KCR developed the roadmap for creation of a political outfit to fight for creation of Telangana. Along with KCR, he is a founding member of the Telangana Rashtra Samithi (TRS) party which was launched on 27 April 2001 with the sole agenda of forming a separate Telangana state with Hyderabad as capital. Since then he began playing a key role in the TRS party and the Telangana movement.

== Electoral History ==
=== Lok Sabha ===
Year	Constituency	Party	Votes	%	Opponent	Party	Votes	%	Result	Margin	%
2004	Hanamkonda	TRS	496,048	59.63	Chada Suresh Reddy	TDP	278,981	33.53	Won	+217,067	+26.10
2009	Karimnagar	TRS	267,684	27.06	Ponnam Prabhakar	INC	317,927	32.14	Lost	−50,243	−5.08
2014	Karimnagar	TRS	505,358	44.83	Ponnam Prabhakar	INC	300,706	26.68	Won	+204,652	+18.15
2019	Karimnagar	TRS	408,768	35.60	Bandi Sanjay Kumar	BJP	498,276	43.40	Lost	−89,508	−7.80
2024	Karimnagar	BRS	282,163	21.46	Bandi Sanjay Kumar	BJP	585,116	44.51	Lost	−302,953	−23.05

== Member of Parliament ==
=== First term (2004–2009) ===
==== Mobilising support for Telangana ====
In the 2004 Lok Sabha elections he contested from Hanamkonda in Warangal and won it with the highest percentage of votes in Andhra Pradesh. As a Member of Parliament he played an important role along with TRS party chief K. Chandrashekar Rao in convincing 32 political parties on the issue of Telangana statehood. At the outset there was virtually no national-level support and the movement was dismissed as a ploy by politicians to grab power. However, through persistent dialogue, parties were brought on-board and eventually letters of support were taken and submitted to the Pranab Mukherjee sub-committee which was set up to examine the statehood demand. He protested against the UPA for not keeping its promise of delivering Telangana by resigning from his Lok Sabha seat in March 2008. However the seat was regained by him in the subsequent by-election. As a people's representative, he undertook many developmental activities for his constituency.

==== Bhupalapally power plant ====
Through his efforts, a power project was set up at Bhupalapally coal belt in Warangal district, in partnership with the Government of Andhra Pradesh and the Rural Electrification Corporation at a total cost of Rs. 2000 crore.

==== Expansion of NH 163/202 ====
National Highway 163 (former NH 202) connecting Hyderabad-Bhupalpatnam, passes through Warangal and is frequently accident prone. A major accident that claimed the lives of 10 people and injured 45 on Independence Day 2005 prompted Kumar to raise and pursue the widening of NH 202. His persistent intervention in Parliament resulted in widening of the highway as well as construction of a high level bridge over Godavari river near Etunagaram village to cross the border into Bhupalapatnam in Chhattisgarh.

==== Restoration of Thousand Pillar temple ====
The kalyanamandapam of the iconic thousand pillar temple of Hanamkonda was dilapidated and its restoration work was pending for many years. After becoming an MP Kumar raised the issue in 2007 with the then Chief Minister of Andhra Pradesh Y. S. Rajasekhara Reddy, the Centre as well as the Archaeological Survey of India. The Centre released funds of Rs. 3 crores after his persistent intervention. The subsequent pace of restoration picked up and is now close to completion.

==== Drinking water supply and heritage city status for Warangal ====
The city of Warangal suffered from shortages of drinking water supply. Vinod took up the issue and tried to get the city included within the eligibility list for the Jawaharlal Nehru National Urban Renewal Mission (JNNURM). However, Warangal could not be included in the mission as the then population of the city was less than10 lakh. Nevertheless, his efforts resulted in Warangal municipal corporation being given Rs. 178 crore in 2007 for implementing a drinking water project. This project aimed at improving the drinking water system for the city and included plans for increasing the storage capacity of the Dharmasagar and Bhadrakali tanks, connecting them through pipelines to existing filter beds and constructing new filter beds. The plan was successfully executed and met the drinking water needs of the city.

Vinod also held discussions with the then Chief Minister YSR to grant heritage city status to Warangal, owing to its historic identity as the capital of the Kakatiya dynasty. The demand was not acceded to immediately but was finally considered in 2015 by the NDA Government which granted heritage city status to Warangal under the HRIDAYscheme.

==== Tourism development for Laknavaram lake ====
As Member of Parliament, Vinod facilitated the state Department of Tourism's plans to develop Laknavaram lake in Warangal district as a tourist spot. A wooden suspension bridge was constructed at a cost of Rs. 40 lakh to connect an island in the middle of the lake with the river bank. Haritha hotel was also constructed in Hanamkonda.

==== Kanthanapally irrigation project ====
The Kanthanapally mega irrigation project in Warangal district was launched as a result of a movement by the TRS. It was aimed at storing 100 TMC of water of which 30 TMC could be supplied to nearby Warangal, Nalgonda and Hyderabad districts for drinking water purposes. The Detailed Project Report (DPR) project was conceptualised by Telangana engineers and the ideas were put into practice through the political activism of the TRS.

==== Babli project ====
Vinod filed a petition in the Supreme Court on the controversial Babli project. This resulted in the apex court directing the Central government to appoint a high-level technical committee on Godavari river water sharing.

=== Telangana Movement (2009–2014) ===
Due to the reorganisation of constituencies for the 2009 Lok Sabha elections, Hanamkonda was declared an SC reserved constituency. Vinod Kumar had to contest from Karimnagar instead of Warangal, and lost the election. Despite the loss, he continued to work at the ground level on various public issues. He threw himself completely into the Telangana movement and started playing an even more vital role in the TRS party. As the Karimnagar district-in-charge of TRS party, he actively toured the district during the Telangana agitation. As one of the key aids of KCR, he was at the forefront in taking many important decisions during the turbulent phase of 2009–14.

==== Legal issues regarding bifurcation ====
As a practicing advocate, he brought his legal acumen to several of the legislative debates on bifurcation. He argued that article 371D of the Constitution of India would not be a hurdle to the creation of Telangana. He also provided clarity on the necessary constitutional amendments required to facilitate smooth bifurcation, whether two-thirds majority of the House was necessary for the passage of the Andhra Pradesh Reorganisation Act, 2014 and the role of Section 8 of the Act which dealt with law and order. Vinod also took an active role in fighting cases filed by political leaders from Andhra Pradesh in the Supreme Court to try and prevent the bifurcation of the state. Such activities provided intellectual firepower to the Telangana agitators and built their confidence.

==== Steel plant in Khammam ====
In April 2013 the Bayyaram iron ore mines in Khammam and Warangal districts were allocated by a Government Order (GO) to Visakhapatnam Steel Plant. This was severely opposed by TRS leaders including Kumar who alleged that this was a continuation of the loot of natural resources from Telangana by Seemandhra rulers. They demanded that a steel plant be set up in the Telangana region itself so as to provide employment to the locals who were far more deprived than their Seemandhra counterparts. Vinod coined the popular slogan ‘Bayyaramu ukku Telangana hakku’ (Bayyaram's ore is Telangana's right) which became a rallying cry for the agitation.

==== Medical seats to Telangana ====
Vinod actively pursued the issue of non- allocation of additional seats for three prestigious medical colleges—Gandhi, Osmania and Kakatiya—in the Telangana region. He questioned the disparity between differential allocation for Seemandhra and Telangana colleges and demanded that the then chief minister KKR camp at Delhi and build pressure on the Prime Minister's office to get 150 additional medical seats (50 each) to the three colleges. He also met the Medical Council of India (MCI) secretary Professor Sanjai Srivastava and discussed the issue with him.

=== Second term (2014–2019) ===
Performance statistics for Vinod Kumar Boianapalli from 1 June 2014 to 13 May 2015

In 2014 he contested in the general elections for the Lok Sabha from Karimnagar constituency and won with a huge margin of 2.04 lakhs. The state of Telangana was created the next month on 2 June 2014, bringing the 60-year-old movement to a close. As a senior leader of the TRS and one of the foremost leaders of the Telangana movement Vinod was appointed as the deputy floor leader of the TRS party in the Lok Sabha. This position is being used to ensure that all issues relevant to Telangana are raised in Parliament and that the TRS MPs get equal opportunities to speak on issues.

==== Merger of 7 Mandals in AP ====
On 29 May 2014 the NDA Government issued an ordinance transferring 136 villages, 211 hamlets and seven mandals from Khammam district in Telangana to East Godavari district in Andhra Pradesh for the sake of the Polavaram Project. This was vehemently opposed by the TRS which argued that it would lead to the displacement of 3 lakh tribals. The BJD opposed the increase in the height of the dam, arguing that it was an arbitrary increase that would lead to the inundation of 307 villages in Odisha and Chhattisgarh.

Vinod Kumar fought against the move inside and outside the Parliament. He filed two petitions in the Supreme Court, challenging both the ordinance and the design of the dam. When the Andhra Pradesh Reorganisation (Amendment) Bill, 2014 was introduced in Parliament to replace the ordinance, he moved a statutory resolution under article 123 (1) (a) of the constitution against the House taking up the Bill. He also raised a point of order in Parliament during the debate, arguing that the ordinance was unconstitutional as it had been issued when the separate Telangana State had already been formed. The President before issuing the ordinance had not elicited the views of the legislative assemblies of Telangana and Andhra Pradesh, as was needed for altering boundaries of the two states. Therefore, the bill was not valid under Article 3 of the Constitution. Nevertheless, as the NDA had superior numbers in the Lok Sabha the Bill was passed.

==== Manoharabad-Kothapalli railway line ====
Karimnagar town is the only district headquarters in Telangana that is not connected to the state headquarters via rail. The 146 km Manoharabad-Kothapalli railway line passes through Vemulawada, also known as Dakshina Kashi, which houses the famous Sri Raja Rajeshwara Swamy Temple. It then goes via Sircilla and Siddipet towns and aims to connect Karimnagar to Secunderabad. The line was first proposed by the current Telangana Chief Minister K. Chandrashekhar Rao when he was the MP for Karimnagar during 2004-09 and was subsequently pursued by Vinod Kumar. The Centre agreed to the proposal on the condition that the State government share one-third cost of construction of the railway project, provide land free of cost and also bear annuity for the first five years after commissioning of the project. The State government agreed to the conditions and Kumar's efforts were fruitful when Rs. 20 crore was sanctioned in the union rail budget 2015–16 for the line. The Government of Telangana has also released funds for acquiring land for the railway.

==== Bifurcation of AP High Court ====
Section 31 and 32 of the Andhra Pradesh Reorganisation Act provide for the bifurcation of the Andhra Pradesh High Court. However delay in the process of bifurcation led TRS leaders to protest against the Government stating that no action was taken even after nine months. Vinod frequently brought up the issue in Parliament and alleged that the issue was being stalled on some pretext or the other. He argued that only six out of the total 29 judges were from Telangana and this led to discrimination in the handling of cases. He even demanded the Prime Minister’s intervention as the discussions with the Law Minister did not yield results. It was Vinod's Lok Sabha question that led to an increase in the strength of judges in the High Court of Telangana from 24 to 42.

==== Increase in seats in Legislative Assemblies ====
Section 26 (1) of the AP Reorganisation Act states that the number of legislative assemblies in Telangana be increased from 119 to 153. However this has been held up by the Ministry of Home Affairs which has stated that the provisions of the section are subject to article 170 of the Constitution which prevents assembly seat increases from taking place till the year 2026. Vinod has been pursuing the issue in Parliament and has even asked for the Prime Minister’s intervention, arguing that there is no justification for the inclusion of article 170 in Section 26 and the words ‘notwithstanding’ should have been used instead of ‘subject to’. He has also introduced a private member's bill seeking to amendment the Act to this effect.

==== General Budget 2014–15 ====
Some of the points made by Vinod on the general budget were:

- Government should have kept its promise of giving income tax relief up to Rs. 5 lakh income as promised in the manifesto.
- Finance Minister should ensure that Committee of Finance Ministry, SMSE Ministry and RBI on MSMEs completes its work within the specific timeframe.
- Mahabubnagar district should be considered for Ultra Mega Solar Power Project.
- Finance Minister should sanction one IIM, one Medical College and AIIMS to Telangana state as the higher education has been neglected in Telangana State during the combined Andhra Pradesh State.
- Finance Minister should allocate more funds in Revised Estimates.
- Government should allocate some funds for opening up of Jan Aushadhis across the country so that the poor can purchase generic drugs in those pharmacies.

==== Railway Budget 2015–16 ====
The demands made on the rail budget were as follows:

- Completion of Peddapalle-Nizamabad project.
- Declaration of railway division in Kazipet.
- Renaming of AP-Express as Telangana Express.
- Initiation of more rail projects in Telangana as rail line coverage in the state is less than the national average.
- Govt should bring out a white paper stating by when they would complete all the pending projects.
- As 88% of freight is carried on road, railways should encourage more freight to go onto it.
- Bullet trains should also be initiated to connect all the metros of the country.

==== Contributions to legislative debates ====
In addition to raising the issues of his state, Vinod Kumar has actively participated in debates surrounding national issues as well. He is a member of the standing committee on water resources and a member of the consultative committee on health and family welfare. He is also currently a member of the Joint Select Committee (JSC) that is examining the Right to Fair Compensation and Transparency in Land Acquisition, Rehabilitation and Resettlement (Amendment) Bill, 2015.

==== Land acquisition ====
Vinod represented the TRS party view on the Right to Fair Compensation and Transparency in Land Acquisition, Rehabilitation and Resettlement (Amendment) Bill, 2015, popularly known as the Land Acquisition Act, 2013.

The points raised by him were as follows:

- Government should say which States are facing trouble in implementing the Act as implementation had not even begun.
- Consent and Social Impact Assessment provisions should be included in the main Bill and TRS party to oppose the amendment if this demand is not met.
- Telangana State framed Rules under section 112 of the Act which stated that implementation officials had to prepare a database of wastelands in the state. Suggestion accepted by Central Govt and brought in as an amendment.
- Land acquisition powers were historically misused for land grab and diversion to real estate.

==== National Judicial Appointments Commission ====
Vinod Kumar represented the TRS party view on the contentious NJAC and wholeheartedly supported the Bill. He stated that the regulations of the Act should be framed at the earliest as they would contain details of how judicial appointments would be made. Given the importance of this procedure, the Parliament should be kept informed by the Government. He also called for the creation of a dedicated all-India judicial service.

==== Goods and Services Tax ====
The following points were made by Vinod on the Constitution (122nd Amendment) (GST) Bill, 2014:

- Supported the Bill with reservations.
- Welcome Central move to create a fund and make compensation claims a legal right.
- States should be given freedom to levy local taxes if the situation warrants.
- Clarity required on unclear how current exemptions including area-based exemptions such as SEZs and Export Oriented Units (EOUs) will be treated with regard to levy of GST.
- Clarity required on the place of supply will have to be clearly defined to avoid disputes among states in the case of inter-state transactions.
- Timeline for transition must be commercially feasible and realistically acceptable for businesses to avoid transfer to price rise to consumers.
- Adequate training should be provided to relevant professionals such as tax administrators and tax professionals.
- IT infrastructure should be given focus as it is the backbone for implementation.

==== Black Money Bill ====
The following points were made on the Undisclosed Foreign Income and Assets (Imposition of Tax) Bill, popularly known as the Black Money Bill:

- Supported the Bill with reservations.
- Limited efforts taken so far in bringing back black money.
- Certain provisions of the Act regarding foreign assets are unrealistic and can be used to harass NRIs who want to invest in India.
- Certain provisions of the Act can lead to double taxation of income and should be corrected.
- Act does not contain provision for stay of recovery of the tax and penalty, even though one may have filed an appeal against an incorrect demand raised by tax authorities. This will definitely encourage corruption by tax authorities.
- Move towards an amnesty known as a ‘one-time settlement’ is questionable given the failure of previous such efforts in the past.
- Government should recognise countries like Singapore, Hong Kong, Mauritius, Switzerland, Cayman Islands, etc. as tax havens.
- Participatory Notes should be abolished immediately.
- Tax administration should be reformed and strengthened.
- Government should create/amend laws that put a limit to how much cash an individual can carry.

==== Juvenile Justice Bill, 2014 ====
The following points were made on the Juvenile Justice (Care and Protection of Children) Bill, 2014:

- Opposed the Bill.
- Highlighted the fact that most juveniles have become like that because of a lifetime of poverty, violence, abuse and neglect and these are the main causes responsible.
- Opposed the trial of juveniles as adults under the provisions of the Bill and asked for more emphasis on rehabilitation and reform.

==== Constituency development (2014–) ====
Vinod Kumar has taken several measures for the development of his birthplace and constituency of Karimnagar. Some of them are:

Adopted backward and tribal Veernapalli village under Pradhan Mantri Sansad Adarsh Gram Yojana. Many developmental activities have been started:

1. Opened Telangana Grameen Bank branch.
2. Requested and got 3G Telecom services for the village.
3. Requested and obtained sanction from Petroleum Minister for one LPG Outlet and one retail outlet at Veernapalli village.
4. Took initiatives to increase ground water level.
5. Organised mega awareness camp for adolescent girls along with Rainbow NGO and district officials.
6. Health camp and animal health camp.
7. Weekly cleanliness drive conducted.
8. Improving service delivery in anganwadi, schools and PDS.
9. Tree planting drive with 100+ trees planted already.
10. Rozgar Divas conducted every Tuesday for giving work orders and payment slips.
- Facilitated supply of water from Lower Manair Dam to Vemulawada and Husnabad towns of Karimnagar parliamentary constituency.
- Obtained sanctions from Human Resource Development Minister Smt Smriti Irani for construction of 3,575 toilets in 1922 schools of Karimnagar Parliamentary Constituency. This is under Swacha Vidyala programme through Sarva Siksha Abhiyaan in association with NTPC, Rotary International and Syndicate Bank.
- Through intervention got the Central Govt to open a Kendriya Vidyalaya (KV) in Sircilla. Due to no allotment of land it was ready to be shifted to some other location, but through intervention land allotment and temporary accommodation were provided. Admissions have started for this academic year 2015–16.
- Asked UPSC Chairman to sanction two more Civil Services Exam centres in Mahabubnagar and Karimangar districts.
- Got a Cricket Stadium with seating capacity of 25-30 thousand spectators sanctioned. Hyderabad Cricket Association in association with BCCI is to build it.
- Efforts are on to start a regional extension centre of Maulana Azad National Urdu University in Karimnagar for the benefit of minorities.
