= Karimnagar Assembly constituency =

Constituency of the Telangana legislative assembly in India

Coordinates: 18.44°N 79.13°E

Karimnagar
- Constituency No. 26 for the Telangana Legislative Assembly
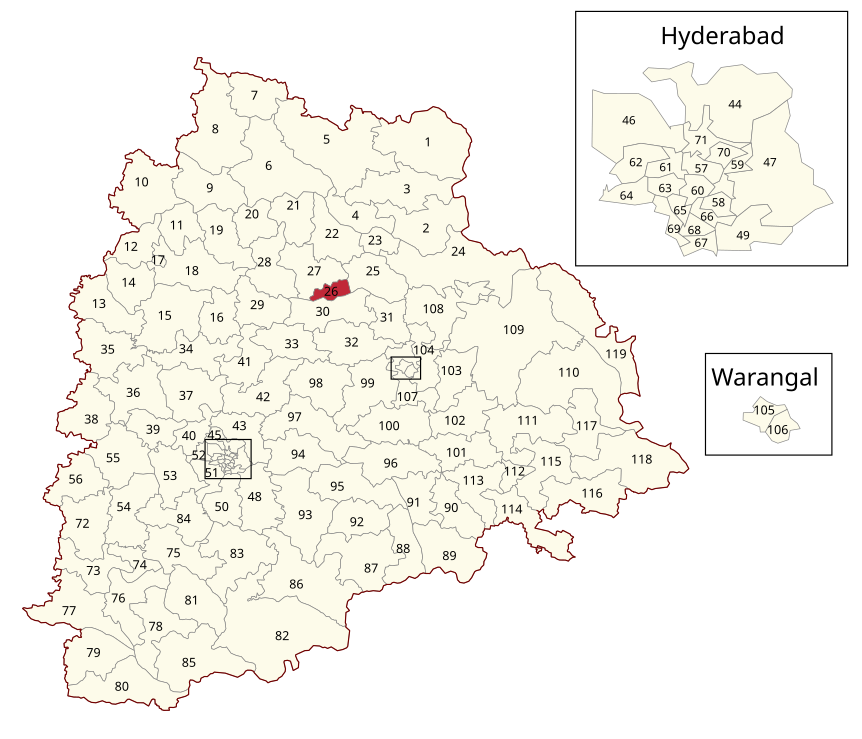
- Location of Karimnagar Assembly constituency within Telangana

Constituency details
- Country: India
- Region: South India
- State: Telangana
- District: Karimnagar
- Lok Sabha constituency: Karimnagar
- Established: 1951
- Total electors: 1,99,331
- Reservation: None

Member of Legislative Assembly
- 3rd Telangana Legislative Assembly
- Incumbent Gangula Kamalakar
- Party: Telangana Rashtra Samithi

Karimnagar Assembly constituency is a constituency of the Telangana Legislative Assembly, India. It is one of the three constituencies in Karimnagar district. It includes the city of Karimnagar. It is part of Karimnagar Lok Sabha constituency.

Gangula Kamalakar, the Ex-Civil Supplies Minister of Telangana, emerged as the winner with a majority of 3,163 votes and is representing the constituency.

== Extent of the constituency ==
The assembly constituency presently comprises the following mandals:

Mandal
Karimnagar City
Karimnagar Rural
Kothapally

== Members of the Legislative Assembly ==
Election	Name	Party
Andhra Pradesh
1972	Juvvadi Chokka Rao	Indian National Congress
1978	Kondal rao	Indian National Congress
1983	K Muthyap rao	Telugu Desam Party
1985	C Anand Rao	Telugu Desam Party
1989	Velichala Jagapathi Rao	Independent
1994	Juvvadi Chandra Sekhar Rao	Telugu Desam Party
1999	Devender Rao Katari	Telugu Desam Party
2004	Meneni Satyanarayana Rao	Indian National Congress
2009	Gangula Kamalakar	Telugu Desam Party
Telangana
2014	Gangula Kamalakar	Telangana Rashtra Samithi
2018	Gangula Kamalakar	Telangana Rashtra Samithi
2023	Gangula Kamalakar	Bharat Rashtra Samithi

== Election results ==
=== Telangana Legislative Assembly election, 2023 ===
Telangana Assembly Elections, 2023: Karimnagar (Assembly constituency)
Party	Candidate	Votes	%	±%
BRS	Gangula Kamalakar	92,179	40.12	
BJP	Bandi Sanjay Kumar	89,016	38.74	
INC	Purumalla Srinivas	40,057	17.43	
BSP	Nallala Srinivas	1,546	0.67	
NOTA	None of the Above	1,269	0.55	
Majority		3,163	1.38	
Turnout		2,29,774		
BRS hold		Swing		

=== Telangana Legislative Assembly election, 2018 ===
Telangana Assembly Elections, 2018: Karimnagar
Party	Candidate	Votes	%	±%
TRS	Gangula Kamalakar	80,983	40.71	
BJP	Bandi Sanjay Kumar	66,009	33.18	
INC	Ponnam Prabhakar	39,500	19.86	
NOTA	None of the Above	982	0.49	
Majority		14,974	7.53	
Turnout		1,98,926	69.29	
TRS hold		Swing		

=== Telangana Legislative Assembly election, 2014 ===
Telangana Assembly Elections, 2014: Karimnagar
Party	Candidate	Votes	%	±%
TRS	Gangula Kamalakar	77,209	40.92	
BJP	Bandi Sanjay Kumar	52,455	27.80	
INC	Chalimeda Laxmi Narasimha Rao	51,339	27.21	
NOTA	None of the Above	750	0.40	
Majority		24,754	13.12	
Turnout		1,88,673	58.49	
TRS gain from TDP		Swing		

2009 Andhra Pradesh Legislative Assembly election: Karimnagar
Party	Candidate	Votes	%	±%
TDP	Gangula Kamalakar	68,738	49.06	
INC	Chalimeda Lakshminarasimha Rao	38,604	27.55	
PRP	Devender Rao Katari	17,794	12.70	
BJP	P. Sugunakar Rao	5,222	3.73	
LSP	Lenkala Raji Reddy	2,714	1.94	
Independent	Md. Jameeluddin	2,141	1.53	
BSP	Amaragoni Parusharam	729	0.52	
Pyramid Party of India	Angarika Rukmini	581	0.41	
Independent	D. Mallaiah	564	0.40	
Independent	Chinthala Laxmi	535	0.38	
Independent	Dr. Sayyed Arif Hussain	510	0.36	
Independent	Pusala Sampath	461	0.33	
Independent	Sriramula Venkateshwarlu	455	0.32	
Independent	Varala Narayana	363	0.26	
Telangana Praja Party	Kavvampalli Mallaiah	320	0.23	
Independent	Madari Srinivas	208	0.15	
Independent	Janga Chandra Reddy	184	0.13	
Majority		30,134	21.51	
Turnout		140,119		

=== 2004 Assembly election results ===
2004 Andhra Pradesh Legislative Assembly election: Karimnagar
Party	Candidate	Votes	%	±%
INC	Meneni Satyanarayana Rao	61,148	40.08	
TDP	Smt. Gandra Nalini	44,571	29.21	
Independent	Ponnam Prabhakar Goud	23,012	15.08	
TRS	Katakam Mruthyunjayam	17,536	11.49	
Independent	Narahari Jagga Reddy	1,714	1.12	
BSP	Kadapala Vijay Kumar	1,517	0.99	
Independent	Polu Arjun	853	0.56	
Independent	Komire Raghavulu	796	0.52	
Independent	Yegurla Mahender Rav King	737	0.48	
Independent	Pakala Ram Reddy	684	0.45	
Majority		16,577	10.87	
Turnout		152,568		

== See also ==
- List of constituencies of Telangana Legislative Assembly
