= Gangula Kamalakar =

Indian politician (born 1968)

Minister of BC Welfare, Food & Civil Supplies, and Consumer Affairs; Government of Telangana
- In office 9 September 2019 – 6 December 2023
- Governor: T. Soundararajan
- Chief Minister: K. Chandrasekhar Rao
- Preceded by: Jogu Ramanna (BC Welfare); Etela Rajender (Food and Civil Supplies & Consumer Affairs)
- Succeeded by: Ponnam Prabhakar

Member of Telangana Legislative Assembly
- Incumbent
- Assumed office 2 June 2014
- Preceded by: Telangana Legislative Assembly – Created
- Constituency: Karimnagar

Member of Andhra Pradesh Legislative Assembly
- In office 2009–2014
- Preceded by: Meneni Satyanarayana
- Succeeded by: Karimnagar Constituency Transferred to Telangana Legislative Assembly
- Constituency: Karimnagar

Personal details
- Born: 8 May 1968 (age 58) Karimnagar, Andhra Pradesh, India
- Party: Bharat Rashtra Samithi; (2013–present)
- Other political affiliations: Telugu Desam Party; (2009–2013)
- Spouse: Rajitha
- Children: 2
- Education: Intermediate (now Higher Secondary Certificate); B.Eng Civil (Discontinued)
- Occupation: Politician

Gangula Kamalakar (born 8 May 1968) is an Indian politician who served as the Minister of BC Welfare, Food and Civil Supplies, and Consumer Affairs of Telangana state. He represents Karimnagar constituency as an MLA in the Telangana Legislative Assembly from the Bharat Rashtra Samithi.

== Early life ==
Kamalakar was born on 8 May 1968 in Karimnagar of present-day Telangana (then part of Andhra Pradesh) to Mallaiah and Laxmi Narasamma. He has educated up to Intermediate. He enrolled at KITS, Ramtek, Nagpur dist in BE (Civil engineering) 1986 batch, unfortunately never been able to go beyond second year due to backlogs. Eventually dropped out. He is married to Rajitha and the couple has a son and a daughter.

== Career ==
Kamalakar started his political career in 2000 when he was elected as a corporator in the Karimnagar Municipality. In 2009, he was elected as an MLA from Karimnagar constituency on a Telugu Desam Party (TDP) ticket. In 2013, he joined the Telangana Rashtra Samithi in the onset of Telangana movement and was re-elected in 2014 and 2018 election from the same constituency. Karimnagar was traditionally considered a stronghold of the Velama caste, however, Kamalakar who hails from the Other Backward Class (OBC) community, managed to get elected in three consecutive terms.

In September 2019, Kamalakar was included in the Second K. Chandrashekar Rao ministry, and was allotted the portfolio of B.C. Welfare, Food & Civil Supplies & Consumer Affairs. Kamalakar is a close aide of minister K. T. Rama Rao who fondly calls him "Karimnagar Bheemudu" and "Kamalakar Anna."
