= Karimnagar Lok Sabha constituency =

Lok Sabha Constituency in Telangana, India

Coordinates: 18.4°N 79.1°E

TG-3
- Indian electoral constituency
- Karimnagar Lok Sabha constituency in Telangana

Constituency details
- Country: India
- Region: South India
- State: Telangana
- Assembly constituencies: Karimnagar; Choppadandi; Vemulawada; Sircilla; Manakondur; Huzurabad; Husnabad
- Established: 1952
- Total electors: 1,147,697
- Reservation: None

Member of Parliament
- 18th Lok Sabha
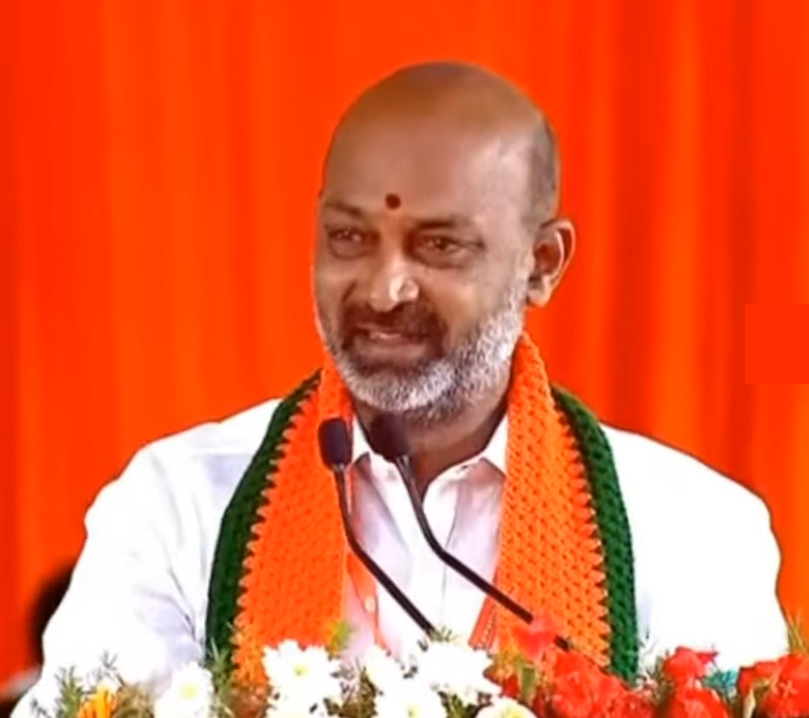
- Incumbent Bandi Sanjay Kumar; Minister of State for Home Affairs
- Party: BJP
- Alliance: NDA
- Elected year: 2024
- Preceded by: B. Vinod Kumar; BRS

Karimnagar Lok Sabha constituency is one of the 17 Lok Sabha (Lower House of the Parliament) constituencies in Telangana state in southern India.

Bandi Sanjay of Bharatiya Janata Party is currently representing the constituency.

== History ==
Since its inception in 1952 Karimnagar seat is a Congress stronghold, various political outfits like the Telangana Praja Samithi, Bharatiya Janata Party and the Telugu Desam Party have won it during different general elections.

After the formation of Telangana Rashtra Samithi the seat has been won by Kalvakuntla Chandrashekar Rao, the founder of TRS during the Telangana Agitation he won thrice from the constituency with huge margin.

== Assembly segments ==
Karimnagar Lok Sabha constituency presently comprises the following Legislative Assembly segments:

No	Name	District	Member	Party	Leading (in 2024)
26	Karimnagar	Karimnagar	Gangula Kamalakar	BRS	BJP
27	Choppadandi (SC)	Karimnagar	Medipally Sathyam	INC	BJP
28	Vemulawada	Rajanna Sircilla	Aadi Srinivas	INC	BJP
29	Sircilla	Rajanna Sircilla	K. T. Rama Rao	BRS	BJP
30	Manakondur (SC)	Karimnagar	Dr. Kavvampally Satyanarayana	INC	BJP
31	Huzurabad	Karimnagar	Padi Kaushik Reddy	BRS	BJP
32	Husnabad	Siddipet	Ponnam Prabhakar	INC	INC

== Members of Parliament ==
Year	Member	Party
Hyderabad State
1952	M. R. Krishna Rao	Scheduled Castes Federation
1952	Juvvadi Ram Mohan Rao	People's Democratic Front
Andhra Pradesh
1957	M. R. Krishna Rao	Indian National Congress
1957	M. Sri Ranga Rao	Indian National Congress
1962	Juvvadi Ramapathy Rao	Indian National Congress
1967	Juvvadi Ramapathy Rao	Indian National Congress
1971	Meneni Satyanarayana Rao	Telangana Praja Samithi
1977	Meneni Satyanarayana Rao	Indian National Congress
1980	Meneni Satyanarayana Rao	Indian National Congress
1984	Juvvadi Chokka Rao	Indian National Congress
1989	Juvvadi Chokka Rao	Indian National Congress
1991	Juvvadi Chokka Rao	Indian National Congress
1996	L. Ramana	Telugu Desam Party
1998	C. Vidyasagar Rao	Bharatiya Janata Party
1999	C. Vidyasagar Rao	Bharatiya Janata Party
2004	K. Chandrashekar Rao	Bharat Rashtra Samithi
2006^	K. Chandrashekar Rao	Bharat Rashtra Samithi
2008^	K. Chandrashekar Rao	Bharat Rashtra Samithi
2009	Ponnam Prabhakar	Indian National Congress
Telangana
2014	B. Vinod Kumar	Bharat Rashtra Samithi
2019	Bandi Sanjay Kumar	Bharatiya Janata Party
2024	Bandi Sanjay Kumar	Bharatiya Janata Party

== Election results ==
Vote share of Winning candidates
2024	44.57%
2019	43.42%
2014	44.93%
2009	32.14%
2008 (by-poll)	36.66%
2006 (by-poll)	47.61%
2004	51.60%
1999	49.73%
1998	42.83%
1996	34.64%
1991	43.42%
1989	44.95%
1984	50.46%
1980	56.12%
1977	58.83%
1971	47.19%
1967	32.14%
1962	50.74%
1957	21.67%
1957	19.33%
1951	27.55%
1951	24.52%

=== 2024 ===
2024 Indian general election: Karimnagar
Party	Candidate	Votes	%	±%
BJP	Bandi Sanjay Kumar	585,116	44.57	▲1.15
INC	Velichala Rajender Rao	359,907	27.41	▲5.79
BRS	B. Vinod Kumar	282,163	21.49	▼14.13
NOTA	None of the above	5,438	0.41	▼0.29
Majority		225,209	17.16	▲9.36
Turnout		1,312,852	72.54	▲3.02
BJP hold		Swing		

=== 2019 ===
2019 Indian general elections: Karimnagar
Party	Candidate	Votes	%	±%
BJP	Bandi Sanjay Kumar	498,276	43.42	▲24.34
TRS	Boianapalli Vinod Kumar	4,08,768	35.62	▼9.31
INC	Ponnam Prabhakar	1,79,258	15.62	▼11.09
NOTA	None of the Above	7,979	0.70	▲0.19
Majority		89,508	7.80	
Turnout		10,94,551	69.52	
BJP gain from TRS		Swing	▲16.83	

=== 2014 ===
2014 Indian general elections: Karimnagar
Party	Candidate	Votes	%	±%
TRS	Boianapalli Vinod Kumar	505,783	44.93	▲17.87
INC	Ponnam Prabhakar	3,00,706	26.71	▼5.43
BJP	Chennamaneni Vidyasagar Rao	2,14,828	19.08	▲6.71
WPOI	Shaik Mahmood	39,308	3.49	
BSP	B. Laxman	11,328	1.00	
RPI(A)	Reddi Malla Srinivas	8,034	0.71	
Majority		2,05,007	18.22	
Turnout		11,25,691	74.71	
TRS gain from INC		Swing		

=== 2009 ===
2009 Indian general elections: Karimnagar
Party	Candidate	Votes	%	±%
INC	Ponnam Prabhakar	317,927	32.14	▲9.91
TRS	Boianapalli Vinod Kumar	2,67,684	27.06	▼20.55
PRP	Velichala Rajender Rao	1,75,370	17.79	New
BJP	Chandupatla Janga Reddy	1,22,337	12.37	▲9.77
Majority		52000	5.08	
Turnout		9,89,301	66.12	
INC gain from TRS		Swing		

=== 2008 by-election ===
2008 Karimnagar Lok Sabha by-election
Party	Candidate	Votes	%	±%
TRS	K. Chandrashekar Rao	269,452	36.66	
INC	T. Jeevan Reddy	253,687	34.51	
TDP	L. Ramana	173,400	23.59	
IND	Kadem Prabhakar	13,746	1.87	
IND	K. Maruthi Prasad	13,558	1.84	
IND	Keshav Rao Jadav	5,858	0.79	
IND	Gaddam Raji Reddy	5,285	0.71	
Majority		15,765	2.15	
TRS hold		Swing		

=== 2006 by-election ===
2006 Karimnagar Lok Sabha by-election
Party	Candidate	Votes	%	±%
TRS	K. Chandrashekar Rao	378,030	47.61	
INC	T. Jeevan Reddy	176,448	22.23	
TDP	L. Ramana	170,268	21.44	
BJP	C. Vidyasagar Rao	21,144	2.66	
IND	Mazhar Mohiuddin	11,184	1.41	
IND	B. Ravindra Prasad Yadav	9,155	1.16	
BSP	K. S. Menayya	8,578	1.06	
IND	Yasala Lingam	5,264	0.66	
IND	Kadem Prabhakar	5,202	0.67	
IND	Kadakuntla Dasaratham	3,544	0.45	
IND	Bolusani Krishnaiah	1,931	0.24	
IND	Bommeravana David Mudiraj	1,712	0.22	
IND	Taher Kamalkhundmiri	1,472	0.19	
Majority		201,582	25.38	
TRS hold		Swing		

=== 2004 ===
2004 Indian general election: Karimnagar
Party	Candidate	Votes	%	±%
TRS	K. Chandrashekar Rao	451,199	51.60	
BJP	C. Vidyasagar Rao	320,031	36.60	
IND	Mamidipalli Gangarajam	59,686	6.83	
BSP	Kothapalli Sandri Menayya	43,582	4.98	
Majority		131,168	15.00	
Turnout		874,498		
Swing to TRS from BJP		Swing		

=== 1999 ===
1999 Indian general election: Karimnagar
Party	Candidate	Votes	%	±%
BJP	C. Vidyasagar Rao	398,437	49.73	
INC	Anand Rao Chelimeda	379,067	47.31	
ATDP (Note: Anna Telugu Desam Party)	Smt. Sankepalli Suma	11,222	1.40	
NTRTDP(LP)	Gajabheemkar Vittal	8,827	1.10	
IND	Dr. B. Achyutha Raju	3,720	0.46	
Majority		19,370	2.42	
Turnout		840,556	66.76	
BJP hold		Swing		

=== 1998 ===
1998 Indian general election: Karimnagar
Party	Candidate	Votes	%	±%
BJP	C. Vidyasagar Rao	329,030	42.83	
TDP	L. Ramana	233,033	30.33	
INC	Meneni Satyanarayana Rao	186,807	24.32	
BSP	Purella Ramulu	9,457	1.23	
IND	Gunti Ramesh	6,484	0.84	
IND	Achyutha Raju, B.	3,406	0.44	
Majority		95,997	12.50	
Turnout		784,303	62.84	
Swing to BJP from TDP		Swing		

=== 1996 ===
1996 Indian general election: Karimnagar
Party	Candidate	Votes	%	±%
TDP	Lgandula Ramana	235,343	34.64	
INC	Chokka Rao J.	183,582	27.02	
NTRTDP(LP)	Gaddam Vinod Reddy	107,263	15.79	
BJP	Edavalli Jagga Reddy	53,733	7.91	
IND	Jagapathi Rao V.	45,969	6.77	
IND	M. Vimala	20,569	3.03	
IND	15 Independent Candidates	31,469	4.64	
LKP (Note: Lok Party)	Pulkem Narasaiah	1,432	0.21	
Majority		51,761	7.62	
Turnout				
Swing to TDP from INC		Swing		

=== 1991 ===
1991 Indian general election: Karimnagar
Party	Candidate	Votes	%	±%
INC	Chokka Rao Juvvadi	223,914	43.42	
IND	N. V. Krishnaiah	106,378	20.63	
BJP	Edavalli Jagga Reddy	99,991	19.39	
JD	G. Mohana Rao	45,375	8.80	
IND	Gurram Rajeswar Reddy	9,730	1.89	
JP	Challuru Ramesh Sagar	7,133	1.38	
IND	Kandula Mallesham	5,808	1.13	
IND	Ragula Hanmandlu	3,088	0.60	
BSP	Asad Khan	3,032	0.59	
IND	M. Gopal	2,849	0.55	
IND	Ramapalli Kistayya	2,460	0.48	
IND	V. Srihari	1,543	0.30	
IND	K. Nagesh	1,366	0.26	
LKP	Mamindla Chinna Bhodmaiah	1,252	0.24	
IND	B. Rajesham	1,077	0.21	
IND	Sagi Rajgopal Rao	682	0.13	
Majority		117,536	22.79	
Turnout		534,428	49.60	
INC hold		Swing		

=== 1989 ===
1989 Indian general election: Karimnagar
Party	Candidate	Votes	%	±%
INC	Chokka Rao Juvvadi	284,200	44.95	
TDP	Anand Rao Chalimeda	249,008	39.38	
IND	Alugubelli Venkta Narsimha Reddy	24,415	3.86	
IND	Asad Khan	18,924	2.99	
IND	Gurram Rajeshwar Reddy	18,460	2.92	
JP	Vempat Madhusudhan	10,032	1.59	
BSP	Korvi Venugopal	10,027	1.59	
LKD(B) (Note: Lok Dal (Bahuguna))	Anjaneyulu Deveraju	4,660	0.74	
LKP	Mamindla Chinna Bhoomalah	3,942	0.62	
IND	N. Balachander	3,684	0.58	
IND	Gottimukkula Easwara Chari	3,446	0.55	
IND	Shabbir	1,487	0.24	
Majority		35,192	5.57	
Turnout		669,734	62.26	
INC hold		Swing		

=== 1984 ===
1984 Indian general election: Karimnagar
Party	Candidate	Votes	%	±%
INC	Juvvadi Chokkarao	243,357	50.46	
IND	M. Chenna Reddy	164,750	34.16	
IND	Komati Reddy Anantha Reddy	18,190	3.77	
IND	Gajangi Anandam	14,794	3.07	
IND	Gurram Rajeshwar Reddy	11,592	2.40	
IND	Baddem Lachi Reddy	9,311	1.93	
IND	Gajula Gopal Reddy	6,668	1.38	
IND	Baddam Ravinder Reddy	4,533	0.94	
IND	Vasam Gangadhari	3,437	0.71	
IND	Katla Venkatesham	2,004	0.42	
IND	Siripuram Balaiah	1,865	0.39	
IND	Javvaji Madan Mohan Rao	1,811	0.38	
Majority		78,607	16.30	
Turnout		496,088	59.31	
Swing to INC from INC(I)		Swing		

=== 1980 ===
1980 Indian general election: Karimnagar
Party	Candidate	Votes	%	±%
INC(I)	M. Satyanarayana Rao	201,777	56.12	
JP	C. Vidyasagar Rao	45,449	12.64	
JP(S)	Gurram Madhava Reddy	39,733	11.05	
IND	Karnati Yadagiri	26,903	7.48	
IND	Badaruddeen Mohammed	17,901	4.98	
IND	Golipelli Venkataiah	17,651	4.91	
IND	Gurram Rajeshwar Reddy	10,119	2.81	
Majority		156,328	43.48	
Turnout		371,428	50.02	
Swing to INC(I) from INC		Swing		

=== 1977 ===
1977 Indian general election: Karimnagar
Party	Candidate	Votes	%	±%
INC	Meneni Satyanarayana Rao	210,349	58.83	
JP	Juvvadi Gautma Rao	96,301	26.93	
CPI	Chennamaneni Rajeswara Rao	44,055	12.32	
IND	Aleti Raja Prabhakar Reddy	6,827	1.91	
Majority		114,048	31.90	
Turnout		370,915	57.02	
Swing to INC from TPS		Swing		

=== 1971 ===
1971 Indian general election: Karimnagar
Party	Candidate	Votes	%	±%
TPS	Meneni Satyanarayana Rao	119,869	47.19	
INC	V. Jalapathi Rao	109,848	43.25	
IND	A. Raja Prabhakar Reddy	17,341	6.83	
BCM (Note: Backward Classes Mahasabha)	Govardhan Yadav	6,929	2.73	
Majority		10,021	3.94	
Turnout		263,288	47.97	
Swing to TPS from INC		Swing		

=== 1967 ===
1967 Indian general election: Karimnagar
Party	Candidate	Votes	%	±%
INC	J. R. Rao	87,933	32.14	
IND	V. Iswaraiah	85,757	31.35	
CPI	J. A. Rao	57,681	21.09	
IND	A. L. Shukla	24,165	8.83	
IND	A. B. Faruqui	18,016	6.59	
Majority		2,176	0.79	
Turnout		287,041	55.92	
INC hold		Swing		

=== 1962 ===
1962 Indian general election: Karimnagar
Party	Candidate	Votes	%	±%
INC	Juvvadi Ramapathi Rao	120,472	50.74	
IND	Gurram Madhava Reddy	53,069	22.35	
CPI	Channamaneni Rajeswararao	51,247	21.58	
IND	Sangayya	12,633	5.32	
Majority		67,403	28.39	
Turnout		248,500	56.74	
INC win (new seat)				

=== 1957 ===
1957 Indian general election: Karimnagar (Two-member constituency)
Party	Candidate	Votes	%	±%
INC	M. R. Krishna	158,820	21.67	
INC	M. Sri Ranga Rao	141,680	19.33	
PDF	Baddam Yella Reddy	131,553	17.95	
PDF	P. Laxmi Das	120,481	16.44	
IND	Gopal Rao	71,841	9.80	
IND	Pathi Sai Reddy	56,225	7.67	
IND	Samba Murthy	52,363	7.14	
Majority		17,140	2.34	
Turnout		732,963	48.98	

=== 1951 ===
1951–52 Indian general election: Karimnagar (Two-member constituency)
Party	Candidate	Votes	%	±%
PDF	Badan Yella Reddy	197,234	27.55	
SCF	M. R. Krishnan	175,527	24.52	
Socialist	Juvvadi Youtam Rao	154,982	21.65	
INC	Pamulaparti Venkata Narasimha Rao	120,491	16.83	
INC	T. N. Sadalakshmi	67,639	9.45	
Majority		21,707	3.03	
Turnout		715,873	47.67	

== Trivia ==
- C. Vidyasagar Rao, former Governor of Maharashtra represented the constituency in 12th Lok Sabha and 13th Lok Sabha respectively.
- K. Chandrashekar Rao, former Chief Minister of Telangana represented the constituency in 14th Lok Sabha .

== See also ==
- Karimnagar district
- List of constituencies of the Lok Sabha
