= Telangana Praja Samithi =

Indian political party (1969)

- Leader: Pratap Kishore
- President: Neera Kishore
- Secretary: Sanaullah
- Founder: ananthula madan mohan founded initially, then headed by Marri Chenna Reddy
- Founded: 1969
- Headquarters: Hyderabad, Telangana State
- Ideology: Social justice with economic development

Telangana Praja Samithi or Telangana Peoples Convention was an Indian political party which fought for statehood for the Telangana region.

== History ==
TPS was founded in 1969. The founding president of the party was Ananthula Madan Mohan, but was later taken over by Marri Chenna Reddy who spearheaded the Telangana agitation and eventually won 10 Lok Sabha seats in the 1971 elections. Telangana Praja Samithi's support was not crucial as Indira Gandhi got complete superiority in that election. Chenna Reddy dissolved the Telangana Praja Samiti a few days after the resignation of Kasu Brahmananda Reddy on September 24, 1971. Later the members merged into the Congress party.

The party was revived again in 1983 with Vande Mataram Ramchander Rao, as the President, and Pratap Kishore as the General Secretary. After the death of Vandemataram Ram Chander Rao, Gandhian Bhoopati Krishnamurthi (Telangana Gandhi) was elected president and led the party for nearly two decades up to his death in January 2015. After Bhoopati Krishnamoorthi Neera Kishore, was elected as President of Telangana Praja Samithi.

== Movement ==
TPS organized a series of strikes and demonstrations throughout the Telangana region to push their demand for a separate state. In June 1969 general strikes in Hyderabad organized by the TPS led to widespread violence as TPS supporters clashed with supporters of a unified Andhra state and with police.

== Elections ==
In the 1971 Lok Sabha elections, TPS won 10 out of 11 seats in Telangana. However, in September 1971 TPS merged with Congress, and the Telangana agitations temporarily disappeared and P V Narsimha Rao was made the Chief Minister of Andhra Pradesh.

== See also ==
- Indian National Congress breakaway parties
