= 1996 Indian general election in Andhra Pradesh =

- April–May 1996

42 seats
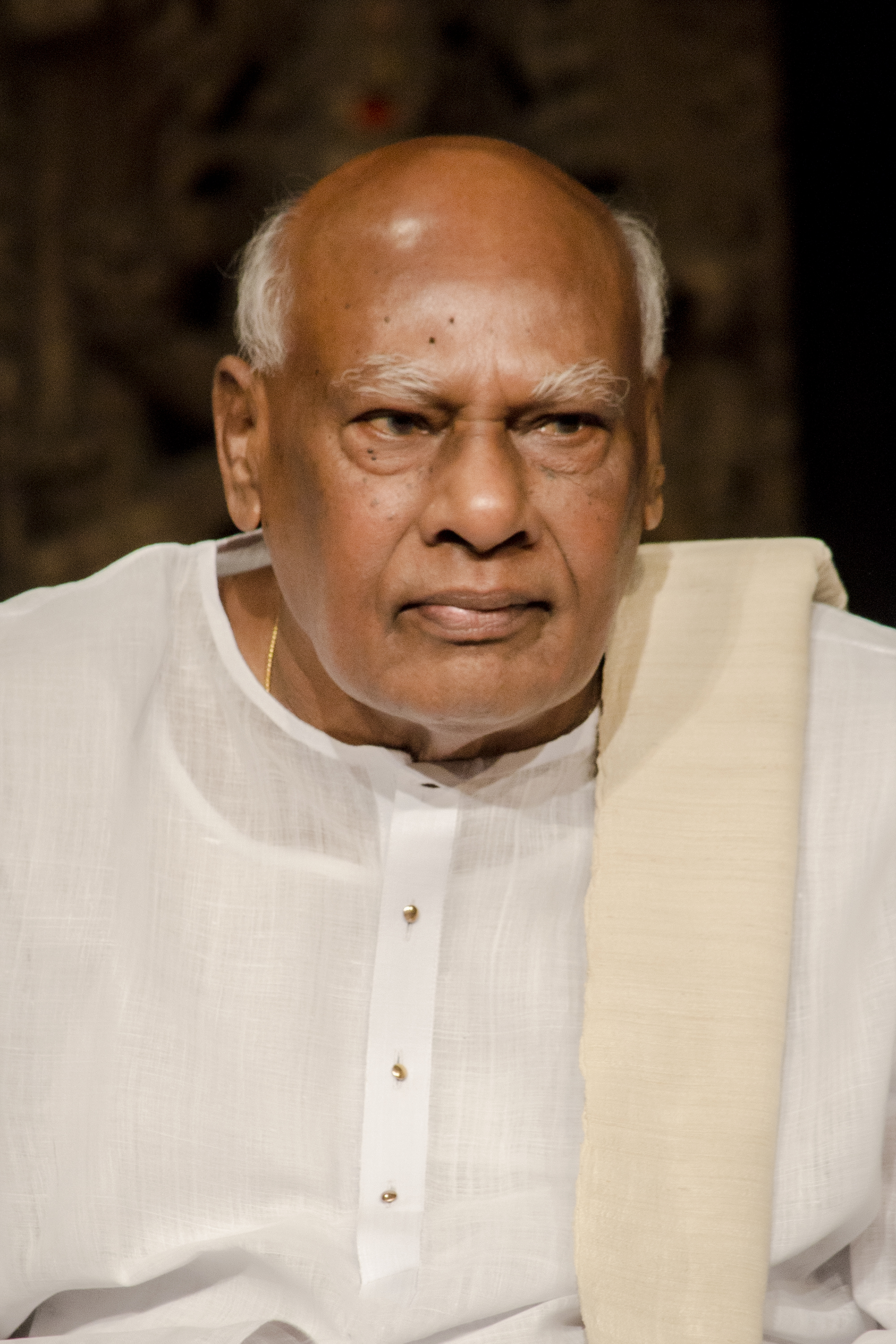

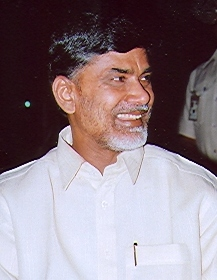

	First party	Second party	Third party
Leader	Konijeti Rosaiah	Chandrababu Naidu	Lakshmi Parvathi
Party	INC	TDP	NTRTDP(LP)
Alliance	Congress alliance	United Front	Nonpartisan
Leader's seat	None	None	None
Last election	25	13	new party
Seats won	22	16	0
Seat change	▼3	▲3	–
Popular vote	12,087,596	11,548,398	3,249,267
Percentage	39.66%	37.89%	10.66%
Swing	–	▲1.33	▲10.66%
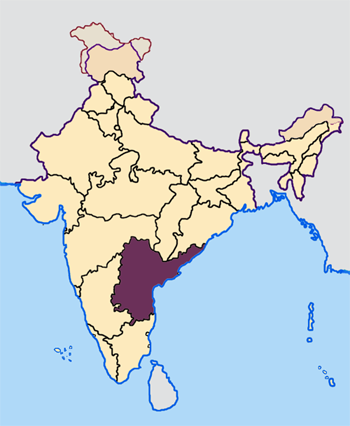
- Andhra Pradesh
Prime Minister before election
P. V. Narasimha Rao
INC
Prime Minister after election
Atal Bihari Vajpayee
BJP

The 1996 Indian general election in Andhra Pradesh were held for 42 seats in the state. The result was a victory for the Indian National Congress which won 22 out of 42 seats. This was the first election contested by the TDP since its leader Chandrababu Naidu ousted the party founder N. T. Rama Rao in a palace coup in August 1995 and the latter's untimely death a few months later.

== Background ==
In August 1995, Nara Chandrababu Naidu overthrew the Government of Andhra Pradesh formed by the actor-turned-politician N. T. Rama Rao (NTR) in a coup d'état. With the support of 178–190 MLAs (Note: Scholars presented varied numbers between 178 and 190.) and NTR's family, Naidu forced NTR to resign and formed his own government. This led to a division in the Telugu Desam Party, founded by NTR, splitting in two camps – Telugu Desam Party (NTR) (TDP (NTR)) and Telugu Desam Party (Naidu) (TDPN) – the former headed by NTR and the later by Chandrababu Naidu, who is also the son-in-law to NTR.

== Parties and alliances ==
Alliance/Party		Flag	Symbol	Leader	Seats contested	
United Front	Telugu Desam Party			N. Chandrababu Naidu	36	42
United Front	Communist Party of India (Marxist)			Harkishan Singh Surjeet	3	42
United Front	Communist Party of India			Sudhakar Reddy	3	42
Indian National Congress				Y. S. Rajasekhara Reddy	42	
NTR Telugu Desam Party (LP)				Lakshmi Parvathi	42	
Bharatiya Janata Party				V. Rama Rao	39	
All India Majlis-e-Ittehadul Muslimeen				Sultan Salahuddin Owaisi	1	

Scholars view three groups to be dominating contestants in the majority of the constituencies – the Congress, Naidu's TDP faction and its allies, and Parvathi's TDP faction and its allies.

=== Congress (I) ===
The Indian National Congress maintained a monopoly in the power structure in the state since its inception in 1956 until 1983 when NTR-led TDP won the 1983 Assembly elections. The sudden death of NTR followed by the split in TDP into TDPN and TDPLP significantly increased the opportunities for the Indian National Congress (I). The party's strategy to retain power at the national level relied on securing a considerable proportion of seats from the state. Congress sustained a reliable support in the state, in the form of one-third voters being its supporters, during the NTR-era since 1983 led to confidence buildup among its leadership of victory in the elections that the party made little effort to reconcile its internal differences. The then Prime Minister P. V. Narasimha Rao hailed from the state and thus raised the stakes of the political future for the party in the state.

=== Telugu Desam Party (Naidu) ===
Nara Chandrababu Naidu saw this election as an opportunity to cement his credibility and legitimacy as the political successor to NTR. It also marked the first time Naidu leading his party into an election and had high stakes for the party's future. The Election Commission of India acknowledged his faction as the authentic Telugu Desam Party and assigned the bicycle symbol that the original TDP used. The left parties – Communist Party of India (CPI) and Communist Party of India (Marxist) (CPIM) – which were allies with TDP since 1984, allied with TDPN.

=== Telugu Desam Party (Lakshmi Parvathi) ===
Following NTR's death on 18 January 1996, the TDP (NTR) fell into the hands of his second-wife, Lakshmi Parvathi. The party was renamed Telugu Desam Party (Lakshmi Parvathi) (TDPLP). Janata Dal, a member of the National Front coalition, supported her campaign largely as a sign of commemorating NTR, who headed the coalition.

=== Others ===
Other political parties had no significant extent in the state. The Bharatiya Janata Party (BJP) and the Majlis-e-Ittehadul Muslimeen (MIM) were restricted to the twin cities of Hyderabad–Secunderabad. The BJP, despite contesting in 40 constituencies in the 1991 general elections, was able to win only in Secunderabad. However, it received a considerable amount of vote share in the state, particularly in the Telangana region. The Janata Dal was deteriorated of its support base.

== Candidates ==
Caste formed one of the fundamental criteria in the selection of the candidates. Out of 42 seats, 34 are in the general category with the rest being reserved. The Congress nominated 12 candidates, in the general category, belonging to the Reddys. The TDPLP nominated 12 Kammas and 10 Reddys and was thus perceived as an upper caste party. The TDPN, apart from nominating several Reddys and Kammas, followed the NTR's strategy of enticing the Other Backward Class (OBC), who accounted for 44 percent in the state's population, and nominated 9 OBC candidates.

The Congress and the TDP considered caste considerations in nominations while the TDPLP chose to nominate the wealthy and influential candidates of the forward castes in constituencies where they are not dominant, even though the OBCs were considered to play a key role in the battle between the two TDP factions. Scholars argue that the TDPLP lacked any political strategy and sought candidates who held more sway in their respective constituencies.

=== List of Candidates ===
Constituency		INC		TDP+		NTR-TDP(LP)		BJP	
#	Name	Party	Candidate	Party	Candidate	Party	Candidate	Party	Candidate
1	Srikakulam	INC	Kanithi Viswanatham	TDP	Kinjarapu Yerran Naidu	NTDP	Mandamuri Jaya Krishna	BJP	Krishna Chandra Rao Namballa
2	Parvathipuram (ST)	INC	Pradeep Kumar Dev Vyricherla	TDP	Viswasarai Narasimha Rao	NTDP	Satrucharla Vijaya Rama Raju	BJP	Chukka Mahalaxmi
3	Bobbili	INC	Botcha Satyanarayana	TDP	Kondapalli Pydithalli Naidu	NTDP	Gadde Baburao	BJP	Reddi Satarao
4	Visakhapatnam	INC	T. Subbarami Reddi	TDP	Pusapati Ananda Gajapati Raju	NTDP	M. Venkata Rao	BJP	Alwardas Sunkari
5	Bhadrachalam (ST)	INC	Kamala Kumari Karredula	CPI	Sode Ramaiah	NTDP	Setty Laxmanudu	BJP	Kurusa Bojjaiah
6	Anakapalli	INC	Konathala Ramakrishna	TDP	Chintakayala Ayyanna Patrudu	NTDP	Malla Sambasivarao	BJP	Gottumukkala Srihariraju
7	Kakinada	INC	Thota Subba Rao	TDP	Thota Gopala Krishna	NTDP	Chikkala Ramachandrarao	BJP	B. S. R. Krishna
8	Rajahmundry	INC	Chitturi Ravindra	TDP	Chundru Srihari Rao	NTDP	Gorantla Butchaiah Chowdary	BJP	Kantipudi Sarvarayudu
9	Amalapuram (SC)	INC	K. S. R. Murthy	TDP	G. M. C. Balayogi	NTDP	Palli Babu Mohan	BJP	Ayyaji Vema Manepalli
10	Narasapur	INC	Kanumuri Bapi Raju	TDP	Kothapalli Subbarayudu	NTDP	Kalidindi Krishnam Raju (Suchitra)	BJP	Venkata Satyanarayana Paka
11	Eluru	INC	Maganti Venkateswara Rao	TDP	Bolla Buli Ramaiah	NTDP	Pentapati Pullarao	Did not contest	
12	Machilipatnam	INC	Kolusu Peda Reddaiah	TDP	Kaikala Satyanarayana	NTDP	Boppana Gangadhara Chowdary	BJP	R. S. K. Nageswara Rao
13	Vijayawada	INC	P. Upendra	TDP	Vadde Sobhanadreeswara Rao	NTDP	Devineni Nehru	BJP	M. D. Rama Rao
14	Tenali	INC	Singam Basavapunaiah	TDP	Sarada Tadiparthi	NTDP	Ambati Brahmanaiah	BJP	Raghunadh Babu Yedlapati
15	Guntur	INC	Rayapati Sambasiva Rao	TDP	S. M. Laljan Basha	NTDP	Makineni Peda Rathaiah	BJP	Hanumantha Rao Muddana
16	Bapatla	INC	Vijaya Prad Arya	TDP	Ummareddy Venkateswarlu	NTDP	Laavu Rathaiah	BJP	Vemula Mohana Rao
17	Narasaraopet	INC	K. V. Krishna Reddy	TDP	Saidaiah Kota	NTDP	K. Peda Peri Reddy	BJP	Srihari Rao Muvvala
18	Ongole	INC	Magunta Parvathamma	TDP	Mekapati Rajamohan Reddy	NTDP	Gutta Venkata Subbaiah	BJP	A. Samuel George
19	Nellore (SC)	INC	Panabaka Lakshmi	CPI(M)	Tummallagunta Prapancha Bhanu Raju	NTDP	Pasam Sunil Kumar	BJP	Gaddam Lakshmi Narayana
20	Tirupathi (SC)	INC	Nelavala Subrahmanyam	TDP	Gali Rajasree	NTDP	M. Murugaiah	BJP	Kadiveti Pattabhi
21	Chittoor	INC	D. K. Adikesavulu Naidu	TDP	N. Ramakrishna Reddy	NTDP	Gali Muddu Krishnama Naidu	BJP	A. Surendra Babu
22	Rajampet	INC	Annayyagari Sai Prathap	TDP	Pothuraju Prathap	NTDP	Sunku Balaram	BJP	Syed Hussain Shakeel
23	Cuddapah	INC	Y. S. Rajasekhara Reddy	TDP	Kandula Raja Mohana Reddy	NTDP	Ahmed Hussain	BJP	M. Lakshmi Narasaiah
24	Hindupur	INC	S. Gangadhar	TDP	S. Ramachandra Reddy	NTDP	G. Nagireddy	BJP	G. N. Seshagiri Rao
25	Anantapur	INC	Anantha Venkatarami Reddy	CPI	R. Rangappa	NTDP	V. Prabhakar Chowdary	BJP	Veluri Kesava Chowdari
26	Kurnool	INC	Kotla Vijaya Bhaskara Reddy	TDP	S. V. Subba Reddy	NTDP	D. Vishnuvardhan Reddy	BJP	Panchagnula Mallikharjuna Sastry
27	Nandyal	INC	P. V. Narasimha Rao	TDP	Bhuma Nagi Reddy	NTDP	Byreddy Seshasayana Reddy	Did not contest	
28	Nagarkurnool (SC)	INC	Mallu Ravi	TDP	M. Jagannath	NTDP	Indira	BJP	P. Dharam Pal
29	Mahabubnagar	INC	Mallikarjun Goud	TDP	D. K. Aruna	NTDP	A. P. Jithender Reddy	BJP	R. Ravindranath Reddy
30	Hyderabad	INC	P. Sudhakar Reddy	TDP	T. Krishna Reddy	NTDP	P. Mahender Reddy	BJP	M. Venkaiah Naidu
31	Secunderabad	INC	P. V. Rajeshwar Rao	TDP	M. Ramchander Rao	NTDP	N. Prakash Rao	BJP	Bandaru Dattatreya
32	Siddipet (SC)	INC	Nandi Yellaiah	TDP	G. Vijaya Ramarao	NTDP	Sarve Satyanarayana	BJP	Balaram Puli
33	Medak	INC	Mogaligundla Baga Reddy	TDP	Patlolla Manik Reddy	NTDP	G. Laxmi Narsinga Rao	BJP	Ale Narendra
34	Nizamabad	INC	Atmacharan Reddy	TDP	Mandava Venkateshwara Rao	NTDP	Vemula Surender Reddy	BJP	P. Hambhant Reddy
35	Adilabad	INC	Allola Indrakaran Reddy	TDP	Samudrala Venugopal Chary	NTDP	Gona Venkat Amshuman Rao	BJP	Koripelli Narayan Reddy
36	Peddapalli (SC)	INC	Gaddam Venkatswamy	TDP	Suddala Devaiah	NTDP	Mathangi Narsaiah	Did not contest	
37	Karimnagar	INC	J. Chokka Rao	TDP	L. Ramana	NTDP	Gaddam Vinod Reddy	BJP	Edavalli Jagga Reddy
38	Hanamkonda	INC	Kamaluddin Ahmed	TDP	Baswa Reddy Adaboina	NTDP	Chada Suresh Reddy	BJP	Jayapal Vonteru
39	Warangal	INC	Surendra Reddy	TDP	Azmeera Chandulal	NTDP	M. A. Rawoof (Jameel)	BJP	Chandupatla Janga Reddy
40	Khammam	INC	P. V. Rangayya Naidu	CPI(M)	Tammineni Veerabhadram	NTDP	Nageswara Rao Koneru	BJP	Jayachandra Reddy Reddyvari
41	Nalgonda	INC	Gangadhar Tirunagaruu	CPI	Dharma Bhiksham	NTDP	Venreddy Narender Reddy	BJP	N. Indrasena Reddy
42	Miryalguda	INC	Baddam Narsimha Reddy	CPI(M)	Mallu Swarajyam	NTDP	Gattu Madhusudhan Rao	BJP	Ramineni Prabhakar

== Campaign ==
=== Congress' campaign ===
The Congress party displayed clear signs of complacency. The party did not announce any new initiatives and suffered from the lack of any captivating leader. It was constantly hampered by internal divisions and the rivalry between them which at times led to suspensions of several high-ranking members. Scholars studying the election and the proceedings surrounding it argue that the party was merely anticipating to reap the benefits arising out of the conflict between the two TDP divisions – TDPLP and TDPN; they inferred that projections in India Today of winning 40 seats if the party was able to sustain its support base from the previous general election held in 1991 in the state, further fuelled its overconfidence.

=== Chandrababu Naidu's campaign ===
Naidu's strategy involved thorough planning and its execution. He spared no effort to showcase his association with NTR and his policies. Rhetoric involving NTR's pictures was widely deployed as a tool to appeal to the voter-base. NTR's speeches in which he praised Naidu were cherrypicked and played throughout the campaign. One such recordings was from 1984, when NTR was re-instated as the chief minister after the coup, and lauded Naidu for his immense efforts made to reinstate him, was the most often used.

Naidu fell short of Parvathi in terms of diction and crowd-pulling capabilities. To counter this, he used the medium of satellite television networks and thus expanded his reach into the far-flung communities. He directed the MLAs of his party into active campaigning supervision in their respective constituencies. He made all efforts to portray to the public that he was maintaining the populist welfare policies that NTR put into action.

=== Lakshmi Parvathi's campaign ===
Akin to NTR's political journey, she started her campaign in Tirupati aboard "Taraka Rama Chaitanya Ratham", a campaign vehicle resembling the popular "Chaitanya Ratham" used by NTR, and toured around the state. Her oratorial skills drawing huge crowds to her campaign despite a lack of charisma that NTR commanded. She portrayed the coup as an injustice to NTR and called upon the electorate to defeat the "back-stabbers" in the polls. She used the metaphor "Naraasura Samhaaram" (transl. killing of demon named Nara), referring to Nara Chandrababu Naidu. The emotional appeal of playing a voice recording of NTR, in which he refers to Naidu and the MLAs who backed him during the coup as "traitors", was often employed.

She presented herself as "anti-Naidu" but never as "anti-Congress", one of the main ideologies of NTR. This led to speculations that she would support Congress after the elections. Observing the response to her campaign and the sympathy she had gained among the populace following NTR's death, political analysts predicted her decisive victory in the elections. As time progressed, her party witnessed a significant exodus of politicians who played a major role in facilitating NTR's politics down at the local level. There were also hardly any competent leaders at the mid-level in the party.

== List of elected members ==
Constituency		Winner				Runner Up				Margin	%
#	Name	Candidate	Party	Votes	%	Candidate	Party	Votes	%	Margin	%
1	Srikakulam	Kinjarapu Yerran Naidu	TDP	234,278	36.82	Jaya Krishna Mandamuri	NTDP	199,700	31.38	34,578	5.44
2	Parvathipuram (ST)	Pradeep Kumar Dev Vyricherla	INC	231,188	39.95	Viswasarai Narasimha Rao	TDP	222,900	38.52	8,288	1.43
3	Bobbili	Kondapalli Pydithalli Naidu	TDP	276,298	44.16	Botsa Satyanarayana	INC	255,331	40.81	20,967	3.35
4	Visakhapatnam	T. Subbarami Reddy	INC	365,700	43.91	Pusapati Ananda Gajapati Raju	TDP	358,241	43.01	7,459	0.90
5	Bhadrachalam (ST)	Sode Ramaiah	CPI	245,214	37.69	Kamala Kumari Karredula	INC	217,806	33.48	27,408	4.21
6	Anakapalli	Chintakayala Ayyanna Patrudu	TDP	327,290	48.04	Konathala Ramakrishna	INC	277,118	40.67	50,172	7.37
7	Kakinada	Thota Gopala Krishna	TDP	308,480	42.37	Thota Subba Rao	INC	269,981	37.09	38,499	5.28
8	Rajahmundry	Chitturi Ravindra	INC	353,861	46.78	Chundru Srihari Rao	TDP	258,695	34.20	95,166	12.58
9	Amalapuram (SC)	K. S. R. Murthy	INC	245,477	39.51	G. M. C. Balayogi	TDP	216,346	34.82	29,131	4.69
10	Narasapur	Kothapalli Subbarayudu	TDP	304,536	42.91	Kanumuri Bapi Raju	INC	286,910	40.43	17,626	2.48
11	Eluru	Bolla Bulli Ramaiah	TDP	333,167	42.75	Maganti Venkateswara Rao	INC	331,532	42.54	1,635	0.21
12	Machilipatnam	Kaikala Satyanarayana	TDP	275,713	39.57	Kolusu Peda Reddaiah	INC	194,206	27.87	81,507	11.70
13	Vijayawada	P. Upendra	INC	397,709	45.16	Vadde Sobhanadreeswara Rao	TDP	283,435	32.18	114,274	12.98
14	Tenali	Sarada Tadiparthi	TDP	274,244	44.19	Singam Basavapunaiah	INC	237,756	38.31	36,488	5.88
15	Guntur	Rayapati Sambasiva Rao	INC	343,252	46.82	S. M. Laljan Basha	TDP	274,753	37.47	68,499	9.35
16	Bapatla	Ummareddy Venkateswarlu	TDP	276,064	41.51	Vijaya Prad Arya	INC	267,802	40.27	8,262	1.24
17	Narasaraopet	Saidaiah Kota	TDP	316,360	44.28	K. V. Krishna Reddy	INC	297,402	41.63	18,958	2.65
18	Ongole	Magunta Parvathamma	INC	381,475	50.42	Mekapati Rajamohan Reddy	TDP	331,415	43.80	50,060	6.62
19	Nellore (SC)	Panabaka Lakshmi	INC	269,498	39.62	Tummallagunta Prapancha Bhanu Raju	CPI(M)	201,313	29.59	68,185	10.03
20	Tirupati (SC)	Nelavala Subrahmanyam	INC	344,738	46.38	Gali Rajasree	TDP	292,406	39.34	52,332	7.04
21	Chittoor	Nuthanakalva Ramakrishna Reddy	TDP	405,052	50.80	D. K. Adikesavulu Naidu	INC	343,702	43.10	61,350	7.70
22	Rajampet	Sai Prathap Annayyagari	INC	280,557	48.42	Pothuraju Prathap	TDP	230,165	39.72	50,392	8.70
23	Cuddapah	Y. S. Rajasekhara Reddy	INC	368,611	48.75	Kandula Raja Mohana Reddy	TDP	363,166	48.03	5,445	0.72
24	Hindupur	S. Ramachandra Reddy	TDP	353,880	51.10	S. Gangadhar	INC	181,458	26.20	172,422	24.90
25	Anantapur	Anantha Venkatarami Reddy	INC	284,845	44.60	R. Rangappa	CPI	205,986	32.25	78,859	12.35
26	Kurnool	Kotla Vijaya Bhaskara Reddy	INC	323,208	46.43	S. V. Subba Reddy	TDP	290,389	41.72	32,819	4.71
27	Nandyal	P. V. Narasimha Rao	INC	366,431	50.42	Bhuma Nagi Reddy	TDP	267,901	36.86	98,530	13.56
28	Nagarkurnool (SC)	Manda Jagannath	TDP	368,134	48.68	Mallu Ravi	INC	291,759	38.58	76,375	10.10
29	Mahabubnagar	Mallikarjun Goud	INC	259,875	35.79	D. K. Aruna	TDP	254,377	35.03	5,498	0.76
30	Hyderabad	Sultan Salahuddin Owaisi	AIMIM	321,045	34.57	M. Venkaiah Naidu	BJP	247,772	26.68	73,273	7.89
31	Secunderabad	P. V. Rajeshwar Rao	INC	420,660	48.78	Bandaru Dattatreya	BJP	206,302	23.92	214,358	24.86
32	Siddipet (SC)	Nandi Yellaiah	INC	416,733	46.13	G. Vijaya Ramarao	TDP	328,766	36.39	87,967	9.74
33	Medak	Mogaligundla Baga Reddy	INC	286,278	37.42	Patlolla Manik Reddy	TDP	258,789	33.83	27,489	3.59
34	Nizamabad	Atmacharan Reddy	INC	293,244	43.28	Mandava Venkateshwara Rao	TDP	249,645	36.84	43,599	6.44
35	Adilabad	Samudrala Venugopal Chary	TDP	286,477	43.05	Allola Indrakaran Reddy	INC	249,117	37.44	37,360	5.61
36	Peddapalli (SC)	Gaddam Venkatswamy	INC	313,498	44.84	Suddala Devaiah	TDP	248,033	35.48	65,465	9.36
37	Karimnagar	L. Ramana	TDP	235,343	34.64	J. Chokka Rao	INC	183,582	27.02	51,761	7.62
38	Hanamkonda	Kamaluddin Ahmed	INC	218,256	38.66	Baswa Reddy Adaboina	TDP	142,686	25.28	75,570	13.38
39	Warangal	Azmeera Chandulal	TDP	292,887	39.85	Surendra Reddy	INC	275,447	37.47	17,440	2.38
40	Khammam	Tammineni Veerabhadram	CPI(M)	374,675	42.82	P. V. Rangayya Naidu	INC	311,384	35.59	63,291	7.23
41	Nalgonda	Dharma Bhiksham	CPI	277,336	33.22	N. Indrasena Reddy	BJP	205,579	24.62	71,757	8.60
42	Miryalguda	Baddam Narsimha Reddy	INC	355,924	43.21	Mallu Swarajyam	CPI(M)	312,048	37.88	43,876	5.33

== By-Elections Held ==
Constituency			Winner				Runner Up				Margin
No.	Name	Date	Candidate	Party	Votes	%	Candidate	Party	Votes	%	Margin
26	Nandyal	1996	Bhuma Nagi Reddy	TDP	567,042	80.94	P. V. Rangayya Naidu	INC	126,892	18.11	440,150
26	Nandyal	1996	The 1996 Nandyal Lok Sabha by-election saw the Telugu Desam Party gain the seat from the Indian National Congress								

== Voting and results ==
=== Results by alliance ===
Alliance/ Party		Popular vote			Seats		
Alliance/ Party		Votes	%	±pp	Contested	Won	+/−
INC		1,20,87,596	39.66	▼5.89	42	22	▼3
TDP+	TDP	99,31,826	32.59	▲0.33	36	16	▲3
TDP+	CPI(M)	8,88,036	2.91	▲0.48	3	1	Steady
TDP+	CPI	7,28,536	2.39	▲0.52	3	2	▲1
TDP+	Total	1,15,48,398	37.89	Steady	42	19	Steady
NTR-TDP(LP)		32,49,267	10.66	Steady	42	0	Steady
BJP		17,20,850	5.65	▼3.89	39	0	▼1
AIMIM		3,40,070	1.12	▼0.66	2	1	Steady
Others		3,69,940	1.22	Steady	70	0	Steady
IND		11,58,741	3.80	▼0.30	1225	0	Steady
Total		3,04,74,862	100%	-	1462	42	-

== Post-election Union Council of Ministers from Andhra Pradesh ==
#	Name	Constituency	Designation	Department	From	To	Party
1	Kinjarapu Yerran Naidu	Srikakulam	Cabinet Minister	Rural Areas and Employment	1 June 1996	21 April 1997	TDP
1	Kinjarapu Yerran Naidu	Srikakulam	Cabinet Minister	Rural Areas and Employment	21 April 1997	19 March 1998	TDP
2	Bolla Bulli Ramaiah	Eluru	MoS(I/C)	Commerce	29 June 1996	21 April 1997	TDP
2	Bolla Bulli Ramaiah	Eluru	MoS(I/C)	Commerce	21 April 1997	19 March 1998	TDP
2	Bolla Bulli Ramaiah	Eluru	MoS(I/C)	Textiles	21 January 1998	19 March 1998	TDP
3	Ummareddy Venkateswarlu	Bapatla	MoS	Parliamentary Affairs	1 June 1996	21 April 1997	TDP
3	Ummareddy Venkateswarlu	Bapatla	MoS	Agriculture	1 June 1996	29 June 1996	TDP
3	Ummareddy Venkateswarlu	Bapatla	MoS	Urban Affairs and Employment	29 June 1996	21 April 1997	TDP
3	Ummareddy Venkateswarlu	Bapatla	MoS	Parliamentary Affairs	21 April 1997	9 June 1997	TDP
3	Ummareddy Venkateswarlu	Bapatla	MoS	Urban Affairs and Employment	21 April 1997	9 June 1997	TDP
3	Ummareddy Venkateswarlu	Bapatla	MoS(I/C)	Urban Affairs and Employment	2 July 1997	19 March 1998	TDP
4	Samudrala Venugopal Chary	Adilabad	MoS	Non-Conventional; Energy Sources	29 June 1996	21 Feb 1997	TDP
4	Samudrala Venugopal Chary	Adilabad	MoS	Power	21 April 1997	9 June 1997	TDP
4	Samudrala Venugopal Chary	Adilabad	MoS	Agriculture	9 June 1997	19 March 1998	TDP
5	S. Jaipal Reddy	Rajya Sabha (Andhra Pradesh)	Cabinet Minister	Information and Broadcasting	1 May 1997	19 March 1998	JD
5	S. Jaipal Reddy	Rajya Sabha (Andhra Pradesh)	Cabinet Minister	Food Processing; Industries	25 Dec 1997	19 March 1998	JD
6	Renuka Chowdhury	Rajya Sabha (Andhra Pradesh)	MoS	Health and Family Welfare	9 June 1997	19 March 1998	TDP

== Analysis ==
=== Party-wise analysis ===
The election, which marked the first to be held after NTR's death, served as the battle ground between Naidu-led and Parvathi-led TDP factions to seize NTR's remnant political influence. Naidu's decision to sustain prohibition and subsidised rice scheme, both of which being NTR's populist welfare policies, paid off leading him to the victory over the Parvathi's faction in the election. The TDPN and its allies, CPI and CPI(M), secured 37.9 percent of the votes totalling 19 seats (16 TDP, 2 CPI, 1 CPI(M)) and managed to assert its dominance over TDPLP which secured 10.6 percent of vote share albeit winning no seats.

Securing 39.7 percent of the vote share with 22 seats, the Congress party performed remarkably well given its rather poor performance across the country. Scholars attribute this phenomenon to the voters of the state reacting historically divergent from national politics; the state's electoral politics had been so distinct compared to other parts in the country that the strategies and forecasts had to be mended to suit such needs. The pre-poll forecasts put Congress to have a clean sweep in the state given that it won 31 of the 42 seats in the 1991 general election and thus winning only 22 seats was seen inadequate. Had the TDP not split and contested in conjunction, scholars argue, it would have won 43.2 percent vote share (32.6 TDPN, 10.6 TDPLP), a figure almost equal to what the it secured (43.3 percent) in 1994 Legislative Assembly election. This would have ended Congress with only 6 seats. Thus, scholars argue the Congress party is the principal gainer of the clash between the two TDP factions.

MIM held the contentious constituency of Hyderabad, the state's capital. BJP lost its only seat to Congress. Analysis of the voting patterns in the Hyderabad region indicated that MIM had a robust support base in the urban area of the city and BJP held sway in the rural region often on the account of the TDP split.

=== Region-wise analysis ===
In the Coastal Andhra region which is constituted of 21 constituencies, the TDPN won 11 constituencies exceeding the analysts' expectations; the Congress won the remaining 10 constituencies. The Congress party saw a degraded performance in the region as it was only able to secure 41.1 percent of the votes polled compared to the 47.1 percent in 1991 general elections. However, it saw a higher vote share when compared to the 37.1 percent in the 1994 Legislative Assembly election. The TDPN-alliance secured 39.4 percent of the votes, thus witnessing a minimal loss compared to 42.9 percent in 1991 general election.

In the Telangana region constituting 15 constituencies, the Congress won 8 while the TDPN-alliance won 6 and the MIM 1 constituency. The Congress party saw a consistent performance in the region with 37.5 percent of the votes in 1991 general election compared to the 37.3 percent in this election. However, the party took significant gains from the 27.6 percent vote share in the 1994 Assembly election. The TDPN-alliance saw an improvement with 33.2 percent vote share compared to the 29.1 percent in 1991 general election.

In the Rayalaseema region comprising 6 constituencies, Congress won 4 while TDPN won the remaining 2 constituencies. The Congress party saw a detrimental performance in the region compared to the 1991 general election when it was able to win all the 6 constituencies. The votes polled for the party also saw a drop, from 59.7 percent in 1991 election to 43.1 percent in this election. However, it was able to gain compared to the 37.4 percent of the votes in the 1994 Legislative Assembly election. The TDPN-alliance saw an increase in its vote share from 33.2 percent in 1991 general election to 44.8 percent in this election.

== See also ==
- Elections in Andhra Pradesh
