= 1991 Indian general election in Andhra Pradesh =

- May–June 1991

42 seats
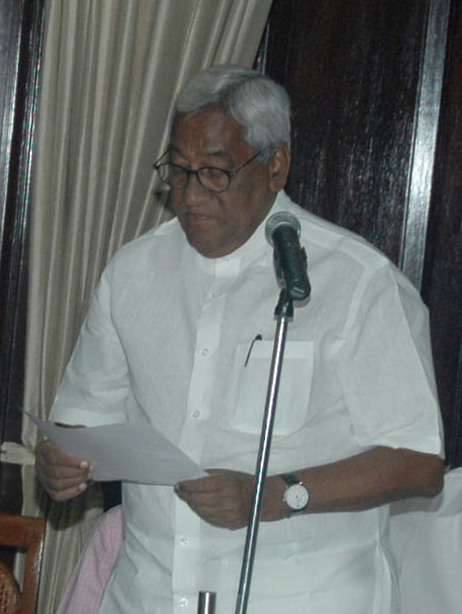

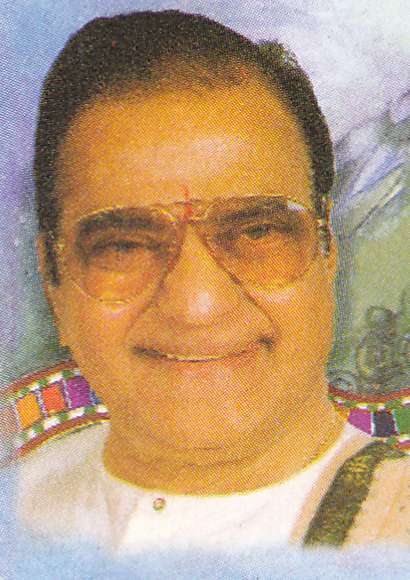
	First party	Second party
Leader	Nedurumalli Janardhana Reddy	N. T. Rama Rao
Party	INC	TDP
Alliance	Congress alliance	National Front
Leader's seat	None	None
Last election	39	2
Seats won	25	13
Seat change	▼14	▲11
Popular vote	12,087,596	9,320,477
Percentage	39.66%	36.56%
Swing	▼11.35%	▼5.46%
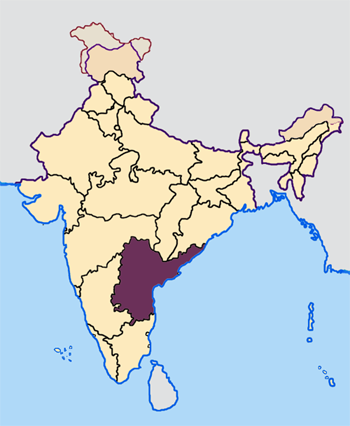
- Andhra Pradesh
Prime Minister before election
Chandra Sekhar
SJP(R)
Prime Minister after election
P. V. Narasimha Rao
INC

The 1991 Indian general election in Andhra Pradesh were held for 42 seats in the state. The result was a victory for the Indian National Congress which won 25 out of 42 seats.

== Parties and alliances ==
=== Indian National Congress ===
Party	Flag	Symbol	Leader	Seats contested
Indian National Congress			N. Janardhana Reddy	42

=== Telugu Desam Party led Alliance ===
Party	Flag	Symbol	Leader	Seats contested
Telugu Desam Party			N. T. Rama Rao	35
Janata Dal			V. P. Singh	2
Communist Party of India			Chandra Rajeswara Rao	2
Communist Party of India (Marxist)			E. M. S. Namboodiripad	2
Indian Congress (Socialist) – Sarat Chandra Sinha			Kishore Chandra Deo	1
Total				42

=== Bharatiya Janata Party ===
Party	Flag	Symbol	Leader	Seats contested
Bharatiya Janata Party			L. K. Advani	41

=== All India Majlis-e-Ittehadul Muslimeen ===
Party	Flag	Symbol	Leader	Seats contested
All India Majlis-e-Ittehadul Muslimeen			Sultan Salahuddin Owaisi	1

=== Other Parties and Independents ===
Party	Flag	Symbol	Seats contested
Other Parties			80
Independents			403

== List of Candidates ==
Constituency		INC		TDP+		BJP	
#	Name	Party	Candidate	Party	Candidate	Party	Candidate
1	Srikakulam	INC	Kanithi Viswanatham	TDP	Appayyadora Hanumanthli	BJP	Attada Appalanaidu
2	Parvathipuram (ST)	INC	Satrucharla Vijaya Rama Raju	IC(S)	Kishore Chandra Deo	Did not contest	
3	Bobbili	INC	Pusapati Ananda Gajapati Raju	TDP	Kemburi Ramamohan Rao	BJP	Paka Raja Rao
4	Visakhapatnam	INC	Uma Gajapathi Raju	TDP	M. V. V. S. Murthi	BJP	P. V. Chalapathi Rao
5	Bhadrachalam (ST)	INC	Kamala Kumari Karredula	CPI	Sode Ramaiah	BJP	Gorle Dhanunjaya Raju
6	Anakapalli	INC	Konathala Ramakrishna	TDP	Pethakamsetti Appala Narasimham	BJP	Veesam Sanyasinaidu
7	Kakinada	INC	M. M. Pallam Raju	TDP	Thota Subbarao	BJP	Rao Venkata Maheepati Rama Ratna Rao
8	Rajahmundry	INC	Jamuna	TDP	K. V. R. Chowdary	BJP	Kantipudi Sarvarayudu
9	Amalapuram (SC)	INC	Kusuma Murthy	TDP	G. M. C. Balayogi	BJP	Janga Ramadasu
10	Narasapur	INC	Krishnam Raju	TDP	Bhupathiraju Vijayakumar Raju	BJP	Kurella Rangayya Naidu (Chiranjeevi)
11	Eluru	INC	Ghattamaneni Krishna	TDP	Bolla Bulli Ramaiah	BJP	Narsimha Rao Korada
12	Machilipatnam	INC	Kavuri Samba Siva Rao	TDP	Kolusu Peda Reddaiah	BJP	Kollipara Dhana Lakshmi
13	Vijayawada	INC	Chennupati Vidya	TDP	Vadde Sobhanadreeswara Rao	BJP	Velagapudi Siva Prasad
14	Tenali	INC	Basavapunnaiah Singam	TDP	Ummareddy Venkateswarlu	BJP	Alla Nauroji Reddy
15	Guntur	INC	N. G. Ranga	TDP	S. M. Laljan Basha	BJP	Hanumantha Rao Muddana
16	Bapatla	INC	Salagala Benjamin	TDP	Daggubati Venkateswara Rao	BJP	Chandra Sekhara Rao Nasana
17	Narasaraopet	INC	Kasu Krishna Reddy	TDP	Anisetty Padmavathi	BJP	Gutha Subbarao
18	Ongole	INC	Magunta Subbarama Reddy	TDP	Dega Narasimha Reddy	BJP	Bathina Narasima Rao
19	Nellore (SC)	INC	Padmashree Kudumula	TDP	M. Nagabhushanamma	BJP	Gaddam Laxmi Narayana
20	Tirupathi (SC)	INC	Chinta Mohan	TDP	P. Subbaiah	BJP	P. Jayamma
21	Chittoor	INC	M. Gnanendra Reddy	TDP	Gurram V. Sreenatha Reddy	BJP	N. P. Jhansi Lakshmi
22	Rajampet	INC	Annayyagari Sai Prathap	TDP	Sugavasi Palakondrayudu	BJP	Challapalli Narasimha Reddy
23	Cuddapah	INC	Y. S. Rajasekhara Reddy	TDP	C. Ramachandraiah	BJP	Gouru Pulla Reddy
24	Hindupur	INC	S. Gangadhar	TDP	K. Ramachandra Reddy	BJP	Seelam Krishna Reddy
25	Anantapur	INC	Anantha Venkatarami Reddy	TDP	B. T. L. N. Chowdary	BJP	Venkataswamy Muthuluru
26	Kurnool	INC	Kotla Vijaya Bhaskara Reddy	TDP	S. V. Subba Reddy	BJP	Kurnool Kapileswaraiah
27	Nandyal	INC	G. Prathap Reddy	TDP	Challa Rama Krishna Reddy	BJP	S. P. Y. Reddy
28	Nagarkurnool (SC)	INC	Mallu Ravi	TDP	P. Mahendranath	BJP	K. Laxman
29	Mahabubnagar	INC	Mallikarjun Goud	TDP	Dyapa Gopal Reddy	BJP	Subba Reddy
30	Hyderabad	INC	M. Shivashankar	TDP	P. Indra Reddy	BJP	Baddam Bal Reddy
31	Secunderabad	INC	T. Manemma	JD	K. Pratap Reddy	BJP	Bandaru Dattatreya
32	Siddipet (SC)	INC	Nandi Yellaiah	TDP	G. Vijaya Rama Rao	BJP	Balaram Puli
33	Medak	INC	Mogaligundla Baga Reddy	TDP	D. Rama Krishna	BJP	Allani Kishan Rao
34	Nizamabad	INC	Tadur Bala Goud	TDP	Gaddam Ganga Reddy	BJP	Loka Bhupathi Reddy
35	Adilabad	INC	P. Narsa Reddy	TDP	Allola Indrakaran Reddy	BJP	Thumala Narayana Reddy
36	Peddapalli (SC)	INC	Gaddam Venkatswamy	TDP	Suddala Devaiah	BJP	Chintha Samba Murthy
37	Karimnagar	INC	J. Chokka Rao	JD	Garikapati Mohan Rao	BJP	Edavalli Jagga Reddy
38	Hanamkonda	INC	Kamaluddin Ahmed	TDP	Vanga Sundershan Reddy	BJP	Chandupatla Janga Reddy
39	Warangal	INC	Surendra Reddy	TDP	Nemarugommula Yethiraja Rao	BJP	Kola Janardhan
40	Khammam	INC	P. V. Rangayya Naidu	CPI(M)	Tammineni Veerabhadram	BJP	Ali Khadar Sayyad
41	Nalgonda	INC	Chakilam Srinivasa Rao	CPI	Dharma Bhiksham	BJP	N. Indrasena Reddy
42	Miryalguda	INC	Baddam Narsimha Reddy	CPI(M)	Bhimreddy Narasimha Reddy	BJP	Oruganti Ramulu

== List of MPs won ==
Constituency		Winner				Runner Up				Margin	%
#	Name	Candidate	Party	Votes	%	Candidate	Party	Votes	%	Margin	%
1	Srikakulam	Kanithi Viswanatham	INC	235,641	42.60	Appayyadora Hanumanthli	TDP	208,977	37.78	26,664	4.82
2	Parvathipuram (ST)	Satrucharla Vijaya Rama Raju	INC	279,415	53.01	Kishore Chandra Deo	IC(S)	229,903	43.61	49,512	9.40
3	Bobbili	Pusapati Ananda Gajapati Raju	INC	280,335	49.59	Kemburi Ramamohan Rao	TDP	252,211	44.62	28,124	4.97
4	Visakhapatnam	M. V. V. S. Murthi	TDP	289,793	45.82	Uma Gajapathi Raju	INC	284,655	45.00	5,138	0.82
5	Bhadrachalam (ST)	Kamala Kumari Karredula	INC	238,956	48.23	Sode Ramaiah	CPI	194,785	39.31	44,171	8.92
6	Anakapalli	Konathala Ramakrishna	INC	261,311	44.67	Pethakamsetti Appala Narasimham	TDP	250,153	42.76	11,158	1.91
7	Kakinada	Thota Subbarao	TDP	287,357	48.85	M. M. Pallam Raju	INC	252,040	42.85	35,317	6.00
8	Rajahmundry	K. V. R. Chowdary	TDP	315,556	51.54	Jamuna	INC	253,547	41.41	62,009	10.13
9	Amalapuram (SC)	G. M. C. Balayogi	TDP	273,490	53.19	Kusuma Murthy	INC	186,003	36.18	87,487	17.01
10	Narasapur	Bhupathiraju Vijayakumar Raju	TDP	317,703	51.93	Krishnam Raju	INC	259,154	42.36	58,549	9.57
11	Eluru	Bolla Bulli Ramaiah	TDP	360,312	52.45	Krishna	INC	312,657	45.51	47,655	6.94
12	Machilipatnam	Kolusu Peda Reddaiah	TDP	298,348	49.02	Sambasiva Rao Kavuri	INC	271,026	44.53	27,322	4.49
13	Vijayawada	Vadde Sobhanadreeswara Rao	TDP	326,890	48.89	Chennupati Vidya	INC	290,669	43.47	36,221	5.42
14	Tenali	Ummareddy Venkateswarlu	TDP	252,900	47.74	Basavapunnaiah Singam	INC	242,729	45.82	10,171	1.92
15	Guntur	S. M. Laljan Basha	TDP	307,073	47.55	N. G. Ranga	INC	292,329	45.27	14,744	2.28
16	Bapatla	Daggubati Venkateswara Rao	TDP	285,778	46.82	Salagala Benjamin	INC	284,681	46.64	1,097	0.18
17	Narasaraopet	Kasu Krishna Reddy	INC	349,041	52.14	Anisetty Padmavathi	TDP	286,425	42.79	62,616	9.35
18	Ongole	Magunta Subbarama Reddy	INC	329,913	49.67	Dega Narasimha Reddy	TDP	290,583	43.75	39,330	5.92
19	Nellore (SC)	Padmashree Kudumula	INC	268,626	45.68	M. Nagabhushanamma	TDP	223,769	38.05	44,857	7.63
20	Tirupathi (SC)	Chinta Mohan	INC	391,534	61.98	P. Subbaiah	TDP	205,345	32.51	186,189	29.47
21	Chittoor	M. Gnanendra Reddy	INC	373,631	56.02	Gurram V. Sreenatha Reddy	TDP	263,649	39.53	109,982	16.49
22	Rajampet	Annayyagari Sai Prathap	INC	325,107	57.94	Palakondrayudu Sugavasi	TDP	162,813	29.02	162,294	28.92
23	Cuddapah	Y. S. Rajasekhara Reddy	INC	583,953	75.29	C. Ramachandraiah	TDP	165,028	21.28	418,925	54.01
24	Hindupur	S. Gangadhar	INC	317,078	53.14	K. Ramachandra Reddy	TDP	217,965	36.53	99,113	16.61
25	Anantapur	Anantha Venkata Reddy	INC	362,676	59.14	B. T. L. N. Chowdary	TDP	200,392	32.67	162,284	26.47
26	Kurnool	Kotla Vijaya Bhaskara Reddy	INC	302,352	51.92	S. V. Subba Reddy	TDP	249,885	42.91	52,467	9.01
27	Nandyal	G. Prathap Reddy	INC	377,556	60.10	Challa Rama Krishna Reddy	TDP	190,790	30.37	186,766	29.73
28	Nagarkurnool (SC)	Mallu Ravi	INC	259,128	44.74	Mahendranath P.	TDP	208,888	36.06	50,240	8.68
29	Mahabubnagar	Mallikarjun Goud	INC	217,072	36.98	Dyapa Gopal Reddy	TDP	184,910	31.50	32,162	5.48
30	Hyderabad	Sultan Salahuddin Owaisi	AIMIM	454,823	46.18	Baddam Bal Reddy	BJP	415,299	42.17	39,524	4.01
31	Secunderabad	Bandaru Dattatraya	BJP	253,924	48.19	T. Manemma Anjaiah	INC	168,861	32.05	85,063	16.14
32	Siddipet (SC)	Nandi Yellaiah	INC	300,629	48.60	G. Vijaya Rama Rao	TDP	185,367	29.96	115,262	18.64
33	Medak	Mogaligundla Baga Reddy	INC	313,740	50.67	D. Rama Krishna	TDP	173,590	28.04	140,150	22.63
34	Nizamabad	Gaddam Ganga Reddy	TDP	257,297	44.41	T. Aduri Bala Goud	INC	188,949	32.62	68,348	11.79
35	Adilabad	Allola Indrakaran Reddy	TDP	208,792	40.96	P. Narasa Reddy	INC	168,816	33.12	39,976	7.84
36	Peddapalli (SC)	Gaddam Venkatswamy	INC	251,019	49.92	Suddala Devaiah	TDP	141,054	28.05	109,965	21.87
37	Karimnagar	J. Chokka Rao	INC	223,914	43.42	N. V. Krishnaiah	IND	106,378	20.63	117,536	22.79
38	Hanamkonda	Kamaluddin Ahmed	INC	188,278	49.28	Vanga Sundershan Reddy	TDP	123,815	32.41	64,463	16.87
39	Warangal	Surendra Reddy	INC	258,733	44.92	Nemarugommula Yethiraja Rao	TDP	206,860	35.91	51,873	9.01
40	Khammam	P. V. Rangayya Naidu	INC	316,186	44.20	Tammineni Veerabhadram	CPI(M)	310,268	43.37	5,918	0.83
41	Nalgonda	Dharma Bhiksham	CPI	282,904	42.30	Chakilam Srinivasa Rao	INC	214,327	32.05	68,577	10.25
42	Miryalguda	Bhimreddy Narasimha Reddy	CPI(M)	309,249	43.52	B. N. Reddy	INC	300,986	42.36	8,263	1.16

== By-Elections Held ==
Constituency			Winner				Runner Up				Margin
No.	Name	Year	Candidate	Party	Votes	%	Candidate	Party	Votes	%	Margin
27	Nandyal	1991	P. V. Narasimha Rao	INC	626,241	89.48	Bangaru Laxman	BJP	45,944	6.56	580,297
27	Nandyal	1991	The 1991 Nandyal Lok Sabha by-election was held after the incumbent MP resigned to allow the Prime Minister-elect to contest the seat and subsequently assume office as Prime Minister.								
26	Kurnool	1991	K. J. P. Reddy	INC	293,922		S.V.S. Reddy	TDP	274,276		19,646
26	Kurnool	1991	Kotla Vijaya Bhaskara Reddy vacated the seat after his appointment as Chief Minister and his son became MP								

== Voting and results ==
=== Results by Alliance ===
Alliance/ Party		Popular vote			Seats		
Alliance/ Party		Votes	%	±pp	Contested	Won	+/−
INC		1,16,10,772	45.55	▼5.46	42	25	▼14
TDP+	TDP	82,23,274	32.26	▼2.19	35	13	▲11
TDP+	CPI(M)	6,19,517	2.43	▲0.03	2	1	▲1
TDP+	CPI	4,77,689	1.87	▼0.09	2	1	▲1
TDP+	JD	1,38,875	0.54	▼1.08	2	0	Steady
TDP+	ICS-SC	2,29,903	0.90	▲0.06	1	0	Steady
TDP+	Total	96,89,258	38.00	Steady	42	15	Steady
BJP		24,54,665	9.63	▲7.66	41	1	▲1
AIMIM		4,54,823	1.78	▼0.32	1	1	Steady
Others		2,35,120	0.94	Steady	483	0	Steady
IND		10,44,005	4.10	▲1.45	403	0	Steady
Total		2,54,88,643	100%	-	609	42	-

== Post-election Union Council of Ministers from Andhra Pradesh ==
#	Name	Constituency	Designation	Department	From	To	Party
1	P. V. Narasimha Rao	Nandyal (Lok Sabha By-election)	Prime Minister	Personnel; Public Grievances and Pensions; Science and Technology; Atomic Energy; Electronics; Ocean Development; Space; All portfolios not allotted to other ministers	21 June 1991	16 May 1996	INC
2	Kotla Vijaya Bhaskara Reddy	Kurnool (Lok Sabha)	Cabinet Minister	Law, Justice and Company Affairs	21 June 1991	9 October 1992	INC
3	Gaddam Venkatswamy	Peddapalli (SC) (Lok Sabha)	Minister of State	Rural Development	21 June 1991	2 July 1992	INC
3	Gaddam Venkatswamy	Peddapalli (SC) (Lok Sabha)	Minister of State	Rural Development	2 July 1992	18 January 1993	INC
3	Gaddam Venkatswamy	Peddapalli (SC) (Lok Sabha)	MoS(I/C)	Textiles	18 January 1993	10 February 1995	INC
3	Gaddam Venkatswamy	Peddapalli (SC) (Lok Sabha)	Cabinet Minister	Textiles	10 February 1995	15 September 1995	INC
3	Gaddam Venkatswamy	Peddapalli (SC) (Lok Sabha)	Cabinet Minister	Labour	15 September 1995	16 May 1996	INC
3	Gaddam Venkatswamy	Peddapalli (SC) (Lok Sabha)	Cabinet Minister	Textiles	20 February 1996	16 May 1996	INC
4	Chinta Mohan	Tirupathi (SC) (Lok Sabha)	Minister of State	Chemicals and Fertilizers	26 June 1991	17 January 1993	INC
5	Kamaluddin Ahmed	Hanamkonda (Lok Sabha)	Minister of State	Civil Supplies; Consumer Affairs; Public Distribution	21 June 1991	29 September 1994	INC
5	Kamaluddin Ahmed	Hanamkonda (Lok Sabha)	Minister of State	Commerce	19 January 1993	29 September 1994	INC
6	P. V. Rangayya Naidu	Khammam (Lok Sabha)	Deputy Minister	Communications	21 June 1991	18 January 1993	INC
6	P. V. Rangayya Naidu	Khammam (Lok Sabha)	Minister of State	Power	18 January 1993	10 February 1995	INC
6	P. V. Rangayya Naidu	Khammam (Lok Sabha)	Minister of State	Water Resources	10 February 1995	16 May 1995	INC
7	Mallikarjun Goud	Mahabubnagar (Lok Sabha)	Minister of State	Railways	21 June 1991	18 January 1993	INC
7	Mallikarjun Goud	Mahabubnagar (Lok Sabha)	Minister of State	Defence	18 January 1993	19 January 1995	INC
7	Mallikarjun Goud	Mahabubnagar (Lok Sabha)	Minister of State	Parliamentary Affairs	17 April 1994	16 May 1996	INC
7	Mallikarjun Goud	Mahabubnagar (Lok Sabha)	Minister of State	Railways	21 August 1995	19 September 1995	INC
7	Mallikarjun Goud	Mahabubnagar (Lok Sabha)	Minister of State	Defence	19 September 1995	16 May 1996	INC
7	Mallikarjun Goud	Mahabubnagar (Lok Sabha)	Minister of State	Defence (Defence Research and Development)	30 September 1995	16 May 1996	INC
8	R. K. Dhawan	Andhra Pradesh (Rajya Sabha)	MoS(I/C)	Urban Affairs and Employment (Urban Development)	15 September 1995	21 February 1996	INC

== See also ==
- Elections in Andhra Pradesh
