= 1989 Indian general election in Andhra Pradesh =

- November 1989

42 seats
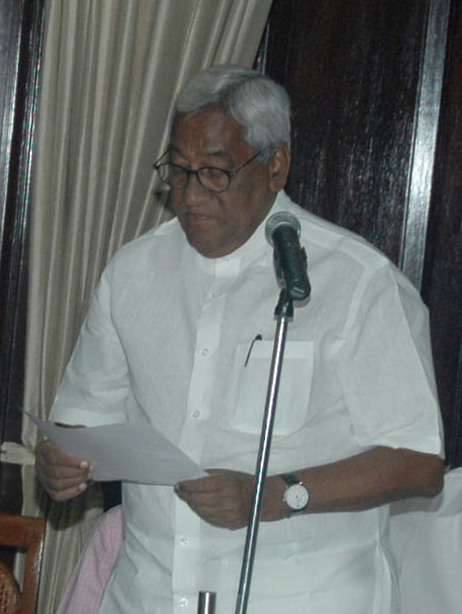

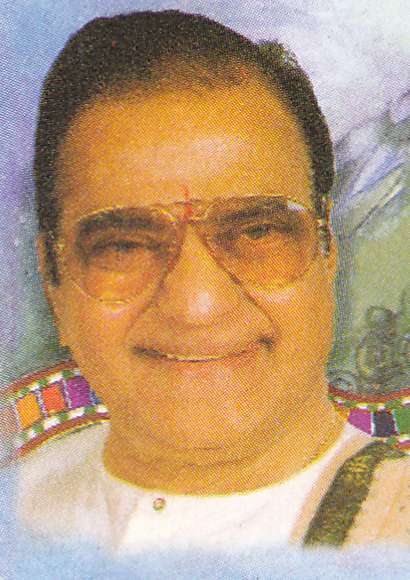
	First party	Second party
Leader	Nedurumalli Janardhana Reddy	N. T. Rama Rao
Party	INC(I)	TDP
Alliance	Congress alliance	National Front
Leader's seat	None	None
Last election	6	30
Seats won	39	2
Seat change	▲33	▼28
Popular vote	14,671,782	9,09,728
Percentage	51.01%	42.40%
Swing	▲9.2%	▼2.42%
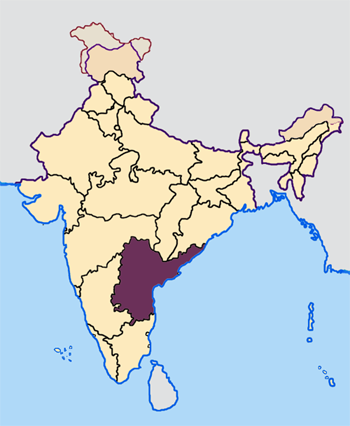
- Andhra Pradesh
Prime Minister before election
Rajiv Gandhi
INC
Prime Minister after election
V. P. Singh
JD

The 1989 Indian general election in Andhra Pradesh were held for 42 seats in the state. The result was a landslide victory for the Indian National Congress which won 39 out of 42 seats.

== Parties and alliances ==
=== Indian National Congress ===
Party	Flag	Symbol	Leader	Seats contested
Indian National Congress			N. Janardhana Reddy	42

=== Telugu Desam Party led Alliance ===
Party	Flag	Symbol	Leader	Seats contested
Telugu Desam Party			N. T. Rama Rao	33
Janata Dal			V. P. Singh	2
Communist Party of India			Chandra Rajeswara Rao	2
Communist Party of India (Marxist)			E. M. S. Namboodiripad	2
Bharatiya Janata Party			L. K. Advani	2
Indian Congress (Socialist) – Sarat Chandra Sinha			Kishore Chandra Deo	1
Total				42

=== All India Majlis-e-Ittehadul Muslimeen ===
Party	Flag	Symbol	Leader	Seats contested
All India Majlis-e-Ittehadul Muslimeen			Sultan Salahuddin Owaisi	5

== List of Candidates ==
Constituency		INC		TDP+		AIMIM	
No.	Name	Party	Candidate	Party	Candidate	Party	Candidate
1	Srikakulam	INC	Kanithi Viswanatham	TDP	Appayyadora Hanumanthu	Did not contest	
2	Parvathipuram (ST)	INC	Satrucharla Vijaya Rama Raju	ICS(S)	Kishore Chandra Deo	Did not contest	
3	Bobbili	INC	Pusapati Ananda Gajapati Raju	TDP	Kemburi Ramamohan Rao	Did not contest	
4	Visakhapatnam	INC	Uma Gajapathi Raju	TDP	M. V. V. S. Murthi	Did not contest	
5	Bhadrachalam (ST)	INC	Kamala Kumari Karredula	CPI	Sode Ramaiah	Did not contest	
6	Anakapalli	INC	Konathala Ramakrishna	TDP	Pethakamsetti Appala Narasimham	Did not contest	
7	Kakinada	INC	M. M. Pallam Raju	TDP	Thota Gopala Krishna	Did not contest	
8	Rajahmundry	INC	Jamuna	TDP	Chundru Srihari	Did not contest	
9	Amalapuram (SC)	INC	Kusuma Murthy	TDP	Aithabathula Jogeswara; Venkata Butchi; Maheswara Rao	Did not contest	
10	Narasapur	INC	Nachu Seshagiri Rao	TDP	Bhupathiraju Vijayakumar Raju	Did not contest	
11	Eluru	INC	Ghattamaneni Krishna	TDP	Bolla Bulli Ramaiah	Did not contest	
12	Machilipatnam	INC	Kavuri Samba Siva Rao	TDP	Boppana Gangadhara Chaudry	Did not contest	
13	Vijayawada	INC	Chennupati Vidya	TDP	Vadde Sobhanadreeswara Rao	Did not contest	
14	Tenali	INC	Basavapannayya Singam	TDP	Ummareddy Venkateswarlu	Did not contest	
15	Guntur	INC	N. G. Ranga	TDP	M. S. S. Koteswararao	Did not contest	
16	Bapatla	INC	Salagala Benjamin	BJP	Venkaiah Naidu	Did not contest	
17	Narasaraopet	INC	Kasu Krishna Reddy	TDP	Pidatala Renga Reddy	Did not contest	
18	Ongole	INC	Mekapati Rajamohan Reddy	TDP	Narayanaswamy Katuri	Did not contest	
19	Nellore (SC)	INC	Puchalapalli Penchalaiah	TDP	M. Nagabhushanamma	Did not contest	
20	Tirupathi (SC)	INC	Chinta Mohan	TDP	M. Muragaiah	Did not contest	
21	Chittoor	INC	M. Gnanendra Reddy	TDP	N. Rangaswamy	Did not contest	
22	Rajampet	INC	Annayyagari Sai Prathap	TDP	C. Ramachandraiah	Did not contest	
23	Cuddapah	INC	Y. S. Rajasekhara Reddy	TDP	M.V. Ramana Reddy	Did not contest	
24	Hindupur	INC	S. Gangadhar	TDP	K. Rameschandra Reddy	Did not contest	
25	Anantapur	INC	Anantha Venkatarami Reddy	TDP	G. Ramanna Chowdary	Did not contest	
26	Kurnool	INC	Kotla Vijaya Bhaskara Reddy	TDP	Erasu Ayyapu Reddy	Did not contest	
27	Nandyal	INC	Bojja Venkata Reddy	TDP	Maddur Subba Reddy	Did not contest	
28	Nagarkurnool (SC)	INC	A. R. Mallu	TDP	V. Tulassi Ram	Did not contest	
29	Mahabubnagar	INC	Mallikarjun Goud	JD	Jaipal Reddy	AIMIM	Aliuddin Ahmed
30	Hyderabad	INC	Lakshman Reddy	TDP	Teegala Krishna Reddy	AIMIM	Sultan Salahuddin Owaisi
31	Secunderabad	INC	T. Manemma	JD	P. Babul Reddy	AIMIM	Mohd. Nazeeruddin
32	Siddipet (SC)	INC	Nandi Yellaiah	TDP	G. Vijaya Rama Rao	Did not contest	
33	Medak	INC	Mogaligundla Baga Reddy	TDP	P. Manik Reddy	Did not contest	
34	Nizamabad	INC	Tadur Bala Goud	TDP	P. Srinivas Reddy	AIMIM	Ahsanulla Khan
35	Adilabad	INC	P. Narsa Reddy	TDP	C. Madhava Reddy	Did not contest	
36	Peddapalli (SC)	INC	Gaddam Venkatswamy	TDP	Gotte Bhoopathy	Did not contest	
37	Karimnagar	INC	J. Chokka Rao	TDP	Anand Rao Chalimeda	Did not contest	
38	Hanamkonda	INC	Kamaluddin Ahmed	BJP	Chandupatla Janga Reddy	Did not contest	
39	Warangal	INC	Surendra Reddy	TDP	T. Kalpana Devi	Did not contest	
40	Khammam	INC	Jalagam Vengala Rao	CPI(M)	Yalamanchili Radhakrishna Murthy	Did not contest	
41	Nalgonda	INC	Chakilam Srinivasa Rao	CPI	Rama Sharma Boddupally	AIMIM	Khaja Pasha
42	Miryalguda	INC	Baddam Narsimha Reddy	CPI(M)	Bhimreddy Narasimha Reddy	Did not contest	

== Voting and results ==
=== Results by Alliance ===
Alliance/ Party		Popular vote			Seats		
Alliance/ Party		Votes	%	±pp	Contested	Won	+/−
TDP+	TDP	99,09,728	34.45	▼10.37	33	2	▼28
TDP+	JD	4,66,874	1.62	New	2	0	New
TDP+	CPI(M)	6,90,829	2.40	▲0.62	2	0	▼1
TDP+	CPI	5,62,545	1.96	▲0.11	2	0	▼1
TDP+	BJP	5,67,124	1.97	▼0.25	2	0	▼1
TDP+	ICS(S)	2,41,587	0.84	▼0.19	1	0	▼1
TDP+	Total	1,24,38,687	43.27	▼8.43	42	2	▼32
INC		1,46,71,782	51.01	▲9.20	42	39	▲33
AIMIM		6,02,895	2.10	New	5	1	Steady
Others		2,89,485	1.01	Steady	38	0	Steady
IND		7,62,070	2.65	▼2.63	140	0	Steady
Total		2,87,64,919	100%	-	267	42	-

== List of MPs won ==
Constituency		Winner				Runner-up				Margin	
Constituency		Candidate	Party	Votes	%	Candidate	Party	Votes	%	Votes	%
1	Srikakulam	Viswanatham Kanithi	INC	288,263	47.70	Appayyadora Hanumanthu	TDP	238,149	39.41	50,114	8.29
2	Parvathipuram (ST)	Vijayaramaraju Satruchala	INC	284,228	51.55	Kishore Chandra Deo	ICS(S)	241,587	43.81	42,641	7.74
3	Bobbili	Komburi Ram Mohan Rao	TDP	325,809	53.27	Anand Gajapathi Raju Poosapati	INC	285,865	46.73	39,944	6.54
4	Visakhapatnam	Uma Gajapathi Raju Poosapati	INC	352,326	50.31	M. V. V. S. Murthy	TDP	326,593	46.63	25,733	3.68
5	Bhadrachalam (ST)	Kariyeddula Kamala Kumari	INC	270,648	48.58	Ramaith Sode	CPI	246,662	44.28	23,986	4.30
6	Anakapalli	Konathala Ramakrishna	INC	299,109	47.21	Appalanarasimham	TDP	299,100	47.21	9	0.00
7	Kakinada	Mallipudi Mangapathi Pallamraju	INC	383,681	54.45	Thota Gopala Krishna	TDP	300,698	42.67	82,983	11.78
8	Rajahmundry	Jamuna	INC	386,314	53.63	Chundru Srihari	TDP	327,992	45.53	58,322	8.10
9	Amalapuram (SC)	Kusuma Krishna Murty	INC	339,419	53.68	Venkata Butchi Maheswara Rao	TDP	284,638	45.02	54,781	8.66
10	Narasapur	Bhupatiraju Vijaya Kumar Raju	TDP	334,215	50.31	Nachu Seshagiri Rao	INC	320,413	48.23	13,802	2.08
11	Eluru	Krishana	INC	410,708	54.36	Bolla Bulli Ramalah	TDP	339,301	44.91	71,407	9.45
12	Machilipatnam	Sambasivarao Kavuri	INC	354,533	52.06	Boppana Gangadhara Chaudry	TDP	311,044	45.67	43,489	6.39
13	Vijayawada	Chennupati Vidya	INC	423,867	52.69	Vadde Sobhanadreeswarrarao	TDP	365,663	45.46	58,204	7.23
14	Tenali	Basavapannayya Singam	INC	345,150	54.60	Ummareddy Venkateswarlu	TDP	280,962	44.44	64,188	10.16
15	Guntur	N. G. Ranga	INC	404,558	53.95	Koteswararao M.S.S	TDP	339,545	45.28	65,013	8.67
16	Bapatla	Salagala Benjamin	INC	364,008	52.15	Muppavarapu Venkaiah Naidu	BJP	320,388	45.90	43,620	6.25
17	Narasaraopet	Kasu Venkata Krishna Reddy	INC	402,289	53.26	Pidatala Renga Reddy	TDP	336,583	44.56	65,706	8.70
18	Ongole	Rajamohana Reddy Mekapati	INC	396,282	56.07	Narayanaswamy Katuri	TDP	298,912	42.29	97,370	13.78
19	Nellore (SC)	Putchalapalli Penchalaiah	INC	377,602	52.83	M. Nagabhushanamma	TDP	305,763	42.78	71,839	10.05
20	Tirupathi (SC)	Chinta Mohan	INC	406,057	54.36	M. Muragaiah	TDP	333,557	44.66	72,500	9.70
21	Chittoor	Gnanendra Reddy	INC	390,786	54.83	N. Rangaswamy	TDP	308,278	43.25	82,508	11.58
22	Rajampet	Annaiahgari Sai Prathap	INC	340,796	51.93	Ramachandraiah C.	TDP	302,373	46.07	38,423	5.86
23	Cuddapah	Y. S. Rajasekhar Reddy	INC	480,524	60.16	M. V. Ramana Reddy	TDP	313,772	39.28	166,752	20.88
24	Hindupur	S. Gangadhara	INC	327,512	50.17	K. Rameschandra Reddy	TDP	325,344	49.83	2,168	0.34
25	Anantapur	Anantha Venkata Reddy	INC	349,685	53.85	G. Ramanna Chowdary	TDP	290,203	44.69	59,482	9.16
26	Kurnool	Kotla Vijay Bhaskara Reddy	INC	363,955	57.89	Erasu Ayyapu Reddy	TDP	253,537	40.32	110,418	17.57
27	Nandyal	Bojja Venkata Reddy	INC	370,097	53.63	Madduru Subba Reddy	TDP	313,835	45.48	56,262	8.15
28	Nagarkurnool (SC)	Anatha Ramulu Mullu	INC	363,026	53.95	V. Tulassi Ram	TDP	291,852	43.37	71,174	10.58
29	Mahabubnagar	Mallikarjun	INC	335,762	51.99	Jayapal Reddy	JD	265,984	41.19	69,778	10.80
30	Hyderabad	Sultan Salahuddin Owaisi	AIMIM	403,625	45.91	Teegala Krishana Reddy	TDP	270,547	30.77	133,078	15.14
31	Secunderabad	T. Manemma	INC	348,491	53.88	P. Babul Reddy	JD	200,890	31.06	147,601	22.82
32	Siddipet (SC)	Yellaiah Nandi	INC	378,172	52.45	G. Vijaya Rama Rao	TDP	291,335	40.41	86,837	12.04
33	Medak	Bagareddy M.	INC	383,586	54.42	P. Manik Reddy	TDP	287,490	40.79	96,096	13.63
34	Nizamabad	Taduri Bala Goud	INC	294,340	45.42	P. Srinivas Reddy	TDP	270,241	41.70	24,099	3.72
35	Adilabad	P. Narasa Reddy	INC	290,072	52.52	C. Madhava Reddy	TDP	245,707	44.49	44,365	8.03
36	Peddapalli (SC)	G. Venkat Swamy	INC	320,628	50.05	Gotte Bhoopathy	TDP	289,993	45.27	30,635	4.78
37	Karimnagar	Chokka Rao Juvvadi	INC	284,200	44.95	Anand Rao Chalimeda	TDP	249,008	39.38	35,192	5.57
38	Hanamkonda	Kamaluddin Ahmed	INC	310,079	50.66	Janga Reddy Chanduptla	BJP	246,736	40.31	63,343	10.35
39	Warangal	Surender Reddy Ramasahayam	INC	311,810	45.81	Kalpana Devi Tourtreddy	TDP	257,689	37.86	54,121	7.95
40	Khammam	Jalagam Vengal Rao	INC	388,461	49.68	Radhakrishna Murthy Yelamanchili	CPI(M)	329,209	42.10	59,252	7.58
41	Nalgonda	Chalilam Srinivasa Rao	INC	357,733	47.99	Rama Sharma Boddupally	CPI	315,883	42.37	41,850	5.62
42	Miryalguda	B. N. Reddy	INC	396,615	50.37	Narsimha Reddy Bheemireddy	CPI(M)	361,620	45.92	34,995	4.45

== See also ==
- Elections in Andhra Pradesh
