= Sunkam Achalu =

Indian politician

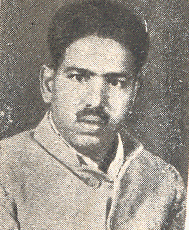
Sunkam Achalu, 1952

Sunkam Achalu (3 March 1924 – 9 August 1983) was an Indian politician. He represented Nalgonda in the Lok Sabha (lower house of the Parliament of India) 1952–1957.

== Youth ==
Son of Kasayya, Sunkam Achalu was born in Nalgonda on 3 March 1924. He didn't get a formal education, and worked as a farmer. At home he managed to learn how to read and write in Urdu, Telugu, and obtained basic English skills. In 1946 he married Ligamma. He lived in Battuguda in Nalgonda town.

== Social work and political struggles ==
Sunkam Achalu led a long struggle for the upliftment of Scheduled Castes. He became a worker of the Indian National Congress at a young age. He left the Congress Party and became a leader of the Scheduled Castes Federation. Between 1948 and 1950 he served as the President of the Nalgonda District branch of the Scheduled Castes Federation. He was also a member of the Working Committee of the Hyderabad Scheduled Castes Federation.

== 1952 election ==
However, ahead of the 1952 Indian general election he was denied a SCF ticket to run for the Lok Sabha. Instead he ran as a candidate for People's Democratic Front for the Scheduled Castes-reserved seat of Nalgonda constituency. He was the running mate of Ravi Narayana Reddy. Sunkam Achalu won the seat, with the highest margin recorded throughout the country. He obtained 282,117 votes. His SCF opponent forfeited his deposit. Aged 27, Sunkam Achalu was one of the youngest Members of Parliament at the time.

Whilst not a party member, Sunkam Achalu sat in the Communist Party of India parliamentary group in the Lok Sabha. He sought to influence the party to prioritize upliftment of Scheduled Castes.

== Death ==
Sunkam Achalu died in Nalgonda on 9 August 1983.
