= 10th Lok Sabha =

Lower House members elected in 1991

| ← | 9th | 11th | → |
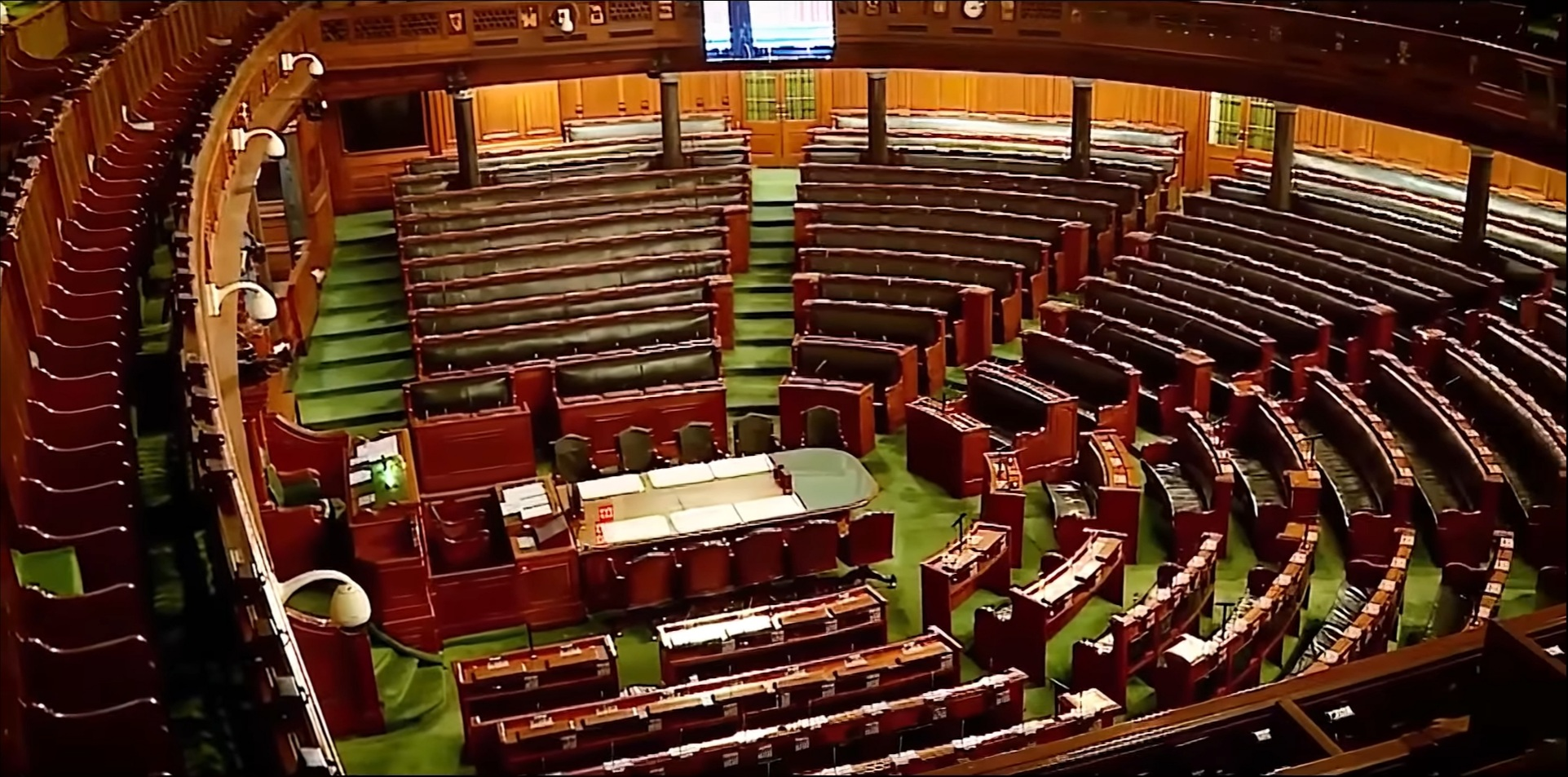
- View of Lok Sabha chamber in the Old Parliament House, New Delhi

Overview
- Legislative body: Indian Parliament
- Election: 1991 Indian general election

The 10th Lok Sabha (20 June 1991 – 10 May 1996) was elected during the 1991 Indian general election held during May–June 1991. The Lok Sabha (House of the People) is the lower house in the Parliament of India, four sitting members from Rajya Sabha, the Upper House of Indian Parliament, were elected to 10th Lok Sabha after the Indian general election, 1991.

P V Narasimha Rao of Indian National Congress became the Prime Minister of India from 21 June 1991 till 16 May 1996, after INC won 244 seats, 47 more than previous 9th Lok Sabha.

The next 11th Lok Sabha was constituted on 15 May 1996, after 1996 Indian general election.

== Important members ==
- Speaker:
  - Shivraj Patil from 10 July 1991 to 22 May 1996
- Deputy Speaker:
  - S. Mallikarjunaiah from 13 August 1991 to 10 May 1996
- Secretary General:
  - K. C. Rastogi from 20 June 1991 to 31 December 1991
  - C K Jain from 1 January 1992 to 31 May 1994
  - R.C. Bhardwaj from 31 May 1994 to 31 December 1995
  - S.N. Mishra from 1 January 1996 to 10 May 1996

== List of members by political party ==
Members of the political party in the 10th Lok Sabha are given below:

| S.No. | Party name | Number of MPs |
|---|---|---|
| 1 | Indian National Congress (INC) | 252 |
| 2 | Bharatiya Janata Party (BJP) | 121 |
| 3 | Janata Dal (JD) | 63 |
| 4 | Communist Party of India (Marxist) (CPI(M) | 36 |
| 5 | Communist Party of India (CPI) | 14 |
| 6 | All India Anna Dravida Munnetra Kazhagam (AIADMK) | 12 |
| 7 | Jharkhand Mukti Morcha (JMM) | 7 |
| 8 | Telugu Desam Party (TDP) | 7 |
| 9 | Telugu Desam (V) (TD(V)) | 6 |
| 10 | Revolutionary Socialist Party (India) (RSP) | 5 |
| 11 | Janata Party(Janata Party) | 4 |
| 12 | Shiv Sena (SS) | 4 |
| 13 | Bahujan Samaj Party(BSP) | 3 |
| 14 | Forward Bloc (Marxist) (FB(M)) | 3 |
| 15 | Nominated (NM) | 3 |
| 16 | Indian Union Muslim League (IUML) | 2 |
| 17 | All India Forward Bloc (AIFB) | 1 |
| 18 | All India Majlis-e-Ittehadul Muslimeen (AIMIM) | 1 |
| 19 | Asom Gana Parishad (AGP) | 1 |
| 20 | Communist Party of India (Marxist-Leninist) Liberation (CPI(ML)L) | 1 |
| 21 | Indian Congress (Socialist) (Congress (S)) | 1 |
| 22 | Indian National Congress (Congress) | 1 |
| 23 | Haryana Vikas Party (HVP) | 1 |
| 24 | Independent (Ind.) | 1 |
| 25 | Kerala Congress (KC) | 1 |
| 26 | Manipur People's Party (MPP) | 1 |
| 27 | N.P.C. (N.P.C.) | 1 |
| 28 | Samata Party (SAP) | 1 |
| 29 | Sikkim Sangram Parishad (SSP) | 1 |

== List of Members by state ==
=== Andhra Pradesh ===
Keys: INC (27) TDP (13) CPI (1) AIMIM (1) BJP (1) CPI(M) (1)

| No. | Constituency | Type | Name of Elected M.P. | Party affiliation |
|---|---|---|---|---|
| 1 | Srikakulam | GEN | Dr.Kanithi Viswanatham | Indian National Congress |
| 2 | Parvathipuram | ST | Vijayarama Raju Satrucharla | Indian National Congress |
| 3 | Bobbili | GEN | Poosapati Ananda Gajapathi Raju | Indian National Congress |
| 4 | Visakhapatnam | GEN | Dr. M.V.V.S Murthi | Telugu Desam Party |
| 5 | Bhadrachalam | ST | Kamala Kumari Karriydula | Indian National Congress |
| 6 | Anakapalli | GEN | Rama Krishna Konathala | Indian National Congress |
| 7 | Kakinada | GEN | Thota Subbarao | Telugu Desam Party |
| 8 | Rajahmundry | GEN | Dr. K.V.R.Choudhary | Telugu Desam Party |
| 9 | Amalapuram | SC | Ganti Mohana Chandra Balayogi | Telugu Desam Party |
| 10 | Narasapur | GEN | Vijaya Kumar Raju Bhupathiraju | Telugu Desam Party |
| 11 | Eluru | GEN | Bolla Bulli Ramaiah | Telugu Desam Party |
| 12 | Machilipatnam | GEN | Kolusu Peda Reddaiah Yadav | Telugu Desam Party |
| 13 | Vijayawada | GEN | Sobhanadreeswara Rao Vadde | Telugu Desam Party |
| 14 | Tenali | GEN | Prof. Ummareddy Venkateswarlu | Telugu Desam Party |
| 15 | Guntur | GEN | Lal Jan Basha S.M. | Telugu Desam Party |
| 16 | Bapatla | GEN | Venkateswara Daggubati Rao | Telugu Desam Party |
| 17 | Narasaraopet | GEN | Kasu Venkata Krishna Reddy | Indian National Congress |
| 18 | Ongole | GEN | Magunta Subbarama Reddy | Indian National Congress |
| 19 | Nellore | SC | Kumari Padmashree Kudumula | Indian National Congress |
| 20 | Tirupathi | SC | Dr.Chinta Mohan | Indian National Congress |
| 21 | Chittoor | GEN | M. Gnanendra Reddy | Indian National Congress |
| 22 | Rajampet | GEN | Annaiahgari Sai Pratap | Indian National Congress |
| 23 | Cuddapah | GEN | Y. S. Rajasekhar Reddy | Indian National Congress |
| 24 | Hindupur | GEN | S.Gangadhar | Indian National Congress |
| 25 | Anantapur | GEN | Anantha Venkatarami Reddy | Indian National Congress |
| 26 | Kurnool | GEN | Kotla Jaya Prakash Reddy | Indian National Congress |
| 27 | Nandyal | GEN | Gangula Prathap Reddy | Indian National Congress |
| 28 | Nagarkurnool | SC | Ravi Mallu | Indian National Congress |
| 29 | Mahabubnagar | GEN | Mallikarjun | Indian National Congress |
| 30 | Hyderabad | GEN | Sultan Salahuddin Owaisi | All India Majlis-E-Ittehadul Muslimeen |
| 31 | Secunderabad | GEN | Bandaru Dattatreya | Bhartiya Janata Party |
| 32 | Siddipet | SC | Nandi Yellaiah | Indian National Congress |
| 33 | Medak | GEN | M.Baga Reddy | Indian National Congress |
| 34 | Nizamabad | GEN | Gaddam Ganga Reddy | Telugu Desam Party |
| 35 | Adilabad | GEN | Allola Indrakaran Reddy | Telugu Desam Party |
| 36 | Peddapalli | SC | G. Venkat Swamy | Indian National Congress |
| 37 | Karimnagar | GEN | Juvvadi Chokka Rao | Indian National Congress |
| 38 | Hanamkonda | GEN | Kamaluddin Ahmed | Indian National Congress |
| 39 | Warangal | GEN | Surendra Reddy | Indian National Congress |
| 40 | Khammam | GEN | Palacholla Venkata Rangayya Naidu | Indian National Congress |
| 41 | Nalgonda | GEN | Bommagani Dharma Bhiksham | Communist Party of India |
| 42 | Miryalguda | GEN | Bhim Narsinha Reddy | Communist Party of India(M) |

=== Arunachal Pradesh ===
Keys: INC (2)

| No. | Constituency | Type | Name of Elected M.P. | Party affiliation |
|---|---|---|---|---|
| 1 | Arunachal West | GEN | Laeta Umbrey | Indian National Congress |
| 2 | Arunachal East | GEN | Prem Khandu Thungon | Indian National Congress |

=== Assam ===
Keys: INC (8) BJP (2) CPI(M) (2) AGP (1) Independent (1)

| No. | Constituency | Type | Name of Elected M.P. | Party affiliation |
|---|---|---|---|---|
| 1 | Karimganj | SC | Dwaraka Nath Das | Bharatiya Janta Party |
| 2 | Silchar | GEN | Kabindra Purkayastha | Bharatiya Janata Party |
| 3 | Autonomous District | ST | Dr. Jayanta Rongpi | Autonomous State Demand Committee |
| 4 | Dhubri | GEN | Nurul Islam | Indian National Congress |
| 5 | Kokrajhar | ST | Satyendra Nath Brohmo Chaudhury | Independent |
| 6 | Barpeta | GEN | Uddabh Berman | CPI(M) |
| 7 | Gauhati | GEN | Kirip Chaliha | Indian National Congress |
| 8 | Mangaldoi | GEN | Probin Deka | Indian National Congress |
| 9 | Tezpur | GEN | Swarup Upadhyay | Indian National Congress |
| 10 | Nowgong | GEN | Muhi Ram Saikia | Asom Gana Parishad |
| 11 | Kaliabor | GEN | Tarun Gogoi | Indian National Congress |
| 12 | Jorhat | GEN | Bijoy Krishna Handique | Indian National Congress |
| 13 | Dibrugarh | GEN | Paban Singh Ghatowar | Indian National Congress |
| 14 | Lakhimpur | GEN | Balin Kuli | Indian National Congress |

=== Bihar ===
| No. | Constituency | Type | Name of Elected M.P. | Party affiliation |
|---|---|---|---|---|
| 1 | Bagaha | SC | Mahendra Baitha | Janata Dal |
| 2 | Bettiah | GEN | Faiyazul Azam | Janata Dal |
| 3 | Motihari | GEN | Kamla Mishra Madhukar | Communist Party of India |
| 4 | Gopalganj | GEN | Abdul Ghafoor | Janata Dal |
| 5 | Siwan | GEN | Brishin Patel | Janata Dal |
| 6 | Maharajganj | GEN | Girija Devi | Janata Dal |
| 7 | Chapra | GEN | Lal Babu Rai | Janata Dal |
| 8 | Hajipur | SC | Ram Sunder Das | Janata Dal |
| 9 | Vaishali | GEN | Shiva Sharan Singh | Janata Dal |
| 9 | Vaishali | GEN | Lovely Anand (By poll) | Samata Party |
| 10 | Muzaffarpur | GEN | George Fernandes | Janata Dal |
| 11 | Sitamarhi | GEN | Nawal Kishore Rai | Janata Dal |
| 12 | Sheohar | GEN | Hari Kishore Singh | Janata Dal |
| 13 | Madhubani | GEN | Bhogendra Jha | Communist Party of India |
| 14 | Jhanjharpur | GEN | Devendra Prasad Yadav | Janata Dal |
| 15 | Darbhanga | GEN | Mohammad Ali Ashraf Fatmi | Janata Dal |
| 16 | Rosera | SC | Ram Vilas Paswan | Janata Dal |
| 17 | Samastipur | GEN | Manjay Lal | Janata Dal |
| 18 | Barh | GEN | Nitish Kumar | Janata Dal |
| 19 | Balia | GEN | Surya Narayan Singh | Communist Party of India |
| 20 | Saharsa | GEN | Surya Narayan Yadav | Janata Dal |
| 21 | Madhepura | GEN | Sharad Yadav | Janata Dal |
| 22 | Araria | SC | Sukdeo Paswan | Janata Dal |
| 23 | Kishanganj | GEN | Syed Shahabuddin | Janata Dal |
| 24 | Purnea | GEN | Pappu Yadav | Independent politician |
| 25 | Katihar | GEN | Yunus Saleem | Janata Dal |
| 26 | Rajmahal | ST | Simon Marandi | Jharkhand Mukti Morcha |
| 27 | Dumka | ST | Shibu Soren | Jharkhand Mukti Morcha |
| 28 | Godda | GEN | Suraj Mandal | Jharkhand Mukti Morcha |
| 29 | Banka | GEN | Pratap Singh | Janata Dal |
| 30 | Bhagalpur | GEN | Chunchun Prasad Yadav | Janata Dal |
| 31 | Khagaria | GEN | Ram Sharan Yadav | Janata Dal |
| 32 | Monghyr | GEN | Brahmanand Mandal | Communist Party of India |
| 33 | Begusarai | GEN | Krishna Sahi | Indian National Congress |
| 34 | Nalanda | GEN | Vijay Kumar Yadav | Communist Party of India |
| 35 | Patna | GEN | Ram Kripal Yadav (1993) | Janata Dal |
| 36 | Arrah | GEN | Ram Lakhan Singh Yadav | Janata Dal |
| 37 | Buxar | GEN | Tej Narayan Singh | Communist Party of India |
| 38 | Sasaram | SC | Chhedi Paswan | Janata Dal |
| 39 | Bikramganj | GEN | Ram Prasad Singh | Janata Dal |
| 40 | Aurangabad | GEN | Ram Naresh Singh | Janata Dal |
| 41 | Jahanabad | GEN | Ramashray Prasad Singh | Communist Party of India |
| 42 | Nawada | SC | Prem Chand Ram | Communist Party of India |
| 43 | Gaya | SC | Rajesh Kumar | Janata Dal |
| 44 | Chatra | GEN | Upendra Nath Verma | Janata Dal |
| 45 | Kodarma | GEN | Mumtaz Ansari | Janata Dal |
| 46 | Giridih | GEN | Binod Bihari Mahato | Jharkhand Mukti Morcha |
| 47 | Dhanbad | GEN | Rita Verma | Bhartiya Janata Party |
| 48 | Hazaribagh | GEN | Bhubneshwar Prasad Mehta | Communist Party of India |
| 49 | Ranchi | GEN | Ram Tahal Choudhary | Bhartiya Janata Party |
| 50 | Jamshedpur | GEN | Shailendra Mahato | Jharkhand Mukti Morcha |
| 51 | Singhbhum | ST | Krishna Marandi | Jharkhand Mukti Morcha |
| 52 | Khunti | ST | Kariya Munda | Bhartiya Janata Party |
| 53 | Lohardaga | ST | Lalit Oraon | Bhartiya Janata Party |
| 54 | Palamau | SC | Ram Deo Ram | Bhartiya Janata Party |

=== Karnataka ===
Keys: INC

| No. | Constituency | Name of Elected M.P. | Party affiliation |
|---|---|---|---|
| 1 | Narasimharaja | Aziz Sait | Indian National Congress |

Keys: JD

| No. | Constituency | Name of Elected M.P. | Party affiliation |
|---|---|---|---|
| 2 | Chikkaballapur | Harish C | Janata Dal |

=== Maharashtra ===
(Plain Text Format)

Ahmednagar	GEN	Gadakh Yeshawantrao	M	INC
Akola	GEN	Fundkar Pandurang Pundlik	M	BJP
Amravati	GEN	Pratibha Devisingh Patil (W)	F	INC
Aurangabad	GEN	Moreshwar Save	M	SHS
Baramati	GEN	Ajit Pawar	M	INC
Beed	GEN	Kshirsagar Kesharbai Sonajirao Alias Kaku (W)	F	INC
Bhandara	GEN	Praful Patel	M	INC
Buldhana	(SC)	Wasnik Mukul Balkrishna	M	INC
Chandrapur	GEN	Potdukhe Shantaram	M	INC
Chimur	GEN	Muttemwar Vilas Baburao	M	INC
Dahanu	(ST)	Damu Barku Shingda	M	INC
Dhule	(ST)	Chaure Bapu Hari	M	INC
Erandol	GEN	Patil Vijay Naval	M	INC
Hingoli	GEN	Gundewar Vilasrao Nagnathrao	M	SHS
Ichalkaranji	GEN	Mane Balaso Alias Rajaram Shankarrao	M	INC
Jalgaon	GEN	Gunavant Rambhau Saroda	M	BJP
Jalna	GEN	Ankushrao Tope	M	INC
Karad	GEN	Chavan Prithviraj Dajishaheb	M	INC
Khed	GEN	Navale Vidura Vithoba	M	INC
Kolaba	GEN	A. R. Antulay	M	INC
Kolhapur	GEN	Gaikwad Udaysingrao Nanasaheb	M	INC
Kopargaon	GEN	Kale Shankarrao Deoram	M	INC
Latur	GEN	Patil Shivraj Vishwanath	M	INC
Mgaon	(ST)	Kahandole Zamru Manglu	M	INC
Mumbai-North	GEN	Ram Naik	M	BJP
Mumbai-North-Central	GEN	Dighe Sharad Shankar	M	INC
Mumbai-North-East	GEN	Gurudas Kamat	M	INC
Mumbai-North-West	GEN	Sunil Dutt	M	INC
Mumbai-South	GEN	Deora Murli	M	INC
Mumbai-South-Central	GEN	Mohan Rawale	M	SHS
Nagpur	GEN	Meghe Dattaji Raghobaji	M	INC
Nanded	GEN	Suryakants Patil (W)	F	INC
Nandurbar	(ST)	Gavit Manikrao Hodalya	M	INC
Nashik	GEN	Pawar Vasant Niwrutti	M	INC
Osmanabad	(SC)	Kamble Arvind Tulshiram	M	INC
Pandharpur	(SC)	Thorat Sandipan Bhagwan	M	INC
Parbhani	GEN	Deshmukh Ashokrao Anandrao	M	SHS
Pune	GEN	Anna Joshi	M	BJP
Rajapur	GEN	Sudhir Sawant	M	INC
Ramtek	GEN	Bhonsle Tejsingharao Laxmanrao	M	INC
Ratnagiri	GEN	Govindram Nikam	M	INC
Sangli	GEN	Patil Prakashbapu Vasantrao	M	INC
Satara	GEN	Bhosale Prataprao Baburao	M	INC
Solapur	GEN	Sadul Dharmanna Mondayya	M	INC
Thane	GEN	Kapse Ramchandra Ganesh	M	BJP
Wardha	GEN	Ghangare Ramchandra Marotrao	M	CPM
Washim	GEN	Anantrao Vitthalrao Deshmukh	M	INC
Yavatmal	GEN	Uttamrao Deorao Patil	M	INC
