= Dharma Bhiksham =

Indian politician

Bommagani Dharma Bhiksham
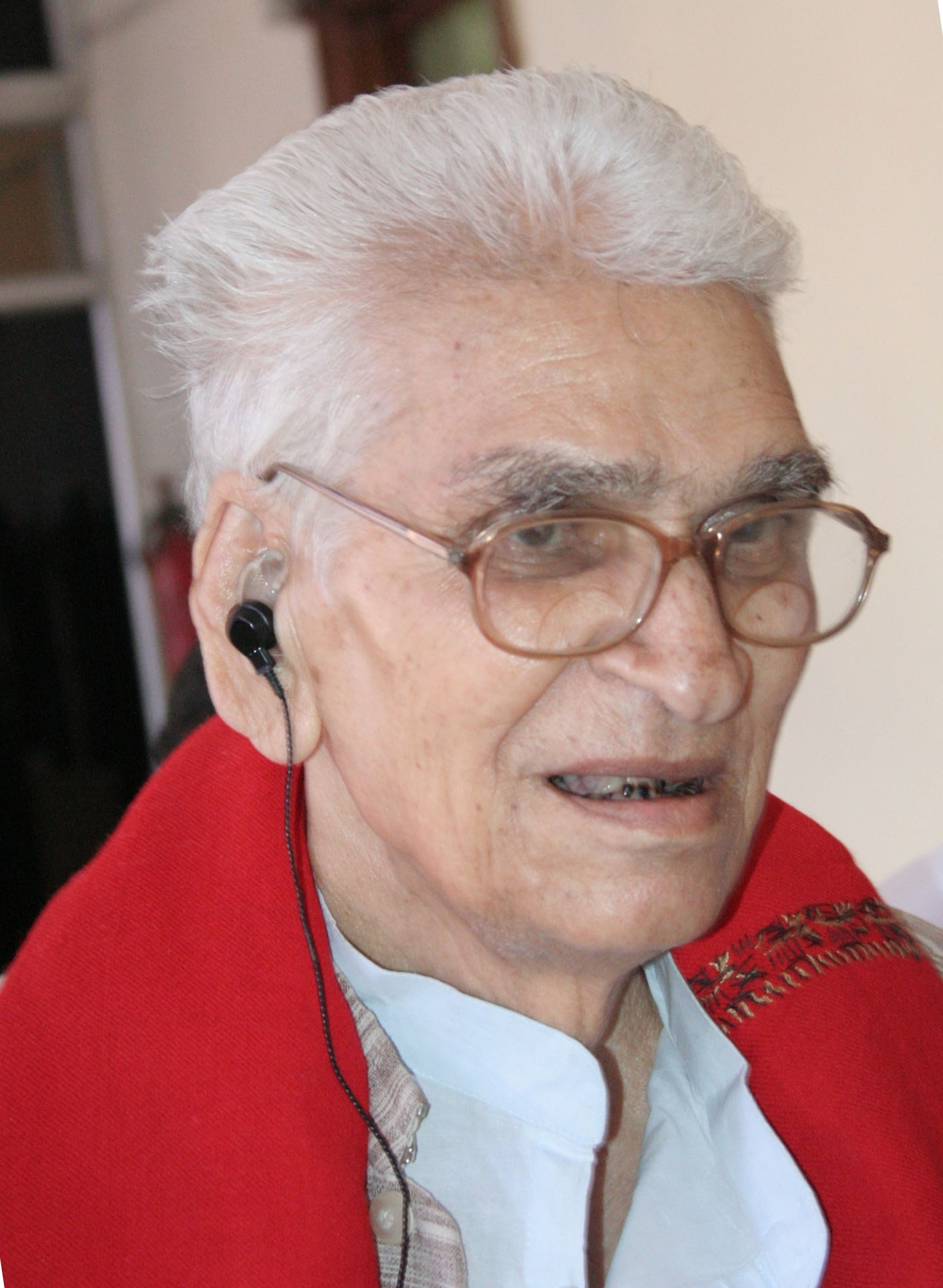

Member of the Lok Sabha
- In office 1991–1998
- Preceded by: Chakilam Srinivasa Rao
- Succeeded by: Suravaram Sudhakar Reddy
- Constituency: Nalgonda

Personal details
- Born: 15 February 1922 Suryapet, Hyderabad State, British India (now in Telangana, India)
- Died: 26 March 2011 (aged 89)
- Party: Communist Party of India
- Children: Bommagani Prabhakar (Adopted Son)
- Parent(s): Muthilingam (Father); Gopamma (Mother)
- Relatives: Venkataiah (Brother)
- Occupation: Freedom Fighter, Communist, Ex-M.P., Ex-MLA

Bommagani Dharma Bhiksham (15 February 1922 – 26 March 2011), a veteran leader of the Communist Party of India, was a member of the 10th Lok Sabha, and 11th Lok Sabha of India. Also, he was elected to Assembly three times. He represented the Nalgonda constituency of Andhra Pradesh both in the Parliament of India and Legislative Assembly of Andhra Pradesh from Communist Party of India (CPI) political party. He also represented Hyderabad State Assembly from Suryapet constituency. He was the renowned freedom fighter during Telangana peasantry armed struggle at the time of Nizam regime. He was well known trade unionist and President of All India Toddy Tappers and workers Federation. Government of India honoured him by awarding the Thamra patra. His brother Venkataiah is also a freedom fighter.

Dharma Bhiksham died on 26 March 2011 due to cardiac arrest in Kamineni Hospital at Hyderabad. He had been admitted in the hospital on 7 February 2011 with right leg fractured and later on contracted infection to the lungs, which subsequently led to his death.

== Personal details ==
Dharma Bhiksham was born in Suryapet, Nalgonda district, Hyderabad State on 15 February 1922 to a toddy tapping couple, Gopamma and Muthilingam. He was a good orator in Telugu, Urdu, English and Hindi. He also worked as journalist during freedom struggle contributing to Meezan, Rayyat, Golconda newspapers. In student days, he was hockey team captain. He was living with his adopted son Bommagani Prabhakar, Andhra Pradesh High court advocate.

== Political career ==
Dharma Bhiksham, having got attracted to the Communist party ideology during his school days, joined Communist Party of India in 1942. Earlier, as a student leader he boycotted the silver jubilee celebrations of the then Nizam's coronation imposed by school headmaster. Even as a student, he ran a students hostel in Suryapet, which was a training centre for students to inculcate patriotism and also to fight against the social evils of those days. Former Minister V. Purushotham Reddy, CPI(M) leader Mallu Venkata Narsimha Reddy, film actor Prabhakar Reddy and several others were the products of his hostel. After India attained independence in 1947, the Communist Party of India party led armed struggles against a series of local monarchs that were reluctant to give up their power particularly in Telangana, Tripura, and Kerala. Dharma Biksham was an active member in rebellion that took place in Telangana, against the Nizam of Hyderabad for which he was imprisoned for more than five years. As an active member of Andhra Mahasabha, he led several processions on behalf of farmers from Nalgonda district on foot. At that time he ran an Arjun pustaka bhandar, a secret library, promoting and distributing prohibited revolutionary literature.

Earlier, he was an Arya Samaj activist for some time, opposing forcible conversion of the then ruler and his followers. Later he joined in Andhra Maha sabha. He organised rebellion against Nizam and razakars rule and was subsequently arrested and imprisoned for more than five years. He was named as most dangerous political prisoner and was held at various jails like Nalgonda, Chenchalguda, Aurangabad, Jalna etc.; at that time he was imprisoned alone in dark cell. He was the convenor of the jail inmates and organised strikes in prisons demanding rights for prisoners.

His victories in the elections are historical. In 1952, first general elections to Hyderabad State Assembly, he got the highest majority. In 1957, he was elected from Nakrekal constituency and in 1962, elected from Nalgonda to Andhra Pradesh Assembly. Dharma Bhiksham achieved a rare feat of hat trick of victories from three different constituencies consecutively. Also, he is one of the very few, who got elected to two state assemblies, i.e., Hyderabad State (1952), Andhra Pradesh (1957 & 1962). He was elected as a member of Parliament of India (MP) twice, in 1991 and 1996, to represent Nalgonda parliamentary constituency in the 10th and 11th Lok Sabha.

In 1991, he was the only M.P. representing CPI from South India. In 1996 he won the election by defeating 480 contestants with a margin well above 76,000 votes. This huge number of contestants in the fray were not against Bhiksham, but contested by the call given by Jala Sadhana Samithi to draw the attention of nation on the neglectful attitude of the Government towards Nalgonda district, which was suffering from heavy fluoride. This election brought the change in the election system in India by enhancing the nomination deposit amount drastically to avoid number of non-serious contestants. Dharma Bhiksham was the only M.P. who got elected twice consecutively from Nalgonda parliamentary constituency.

Dharma Bhiksham was a trade unionist. During the construction of Nagarjuna Sagar project, he organised workers and labour hailing from different areas involved and organised historical strike with one lakh workers for their better livelihood. He also organised trade unions for several unorganised workers such as hotel workers etc.; he is well known for upliftment of toddy tappers community. He organised toddy tappers under A.P. Geetha Panivarala sangam, which is a premier and first union for toddy tappers with more than 50 years of history. He advocated for upgrading the toddy tapping profession scientifically and also to develop it as a rural industry by making sugar, jaggery, chocolates, and cool drinks etc. from toddy. He was instrumental in achieving ex-gratia for the toddy tappers, who fell from toddy palm trees while tapping. He helped in the formation of co-operative societies for toddy tappers. For this he was specially felicitated on the occasion of hundred years of Co-operative movement by the then chief minister Y.S.Rajasekhar Reddy.
