= Suravaram Sudhakar Reddy =

Indian politician (1942–2025)

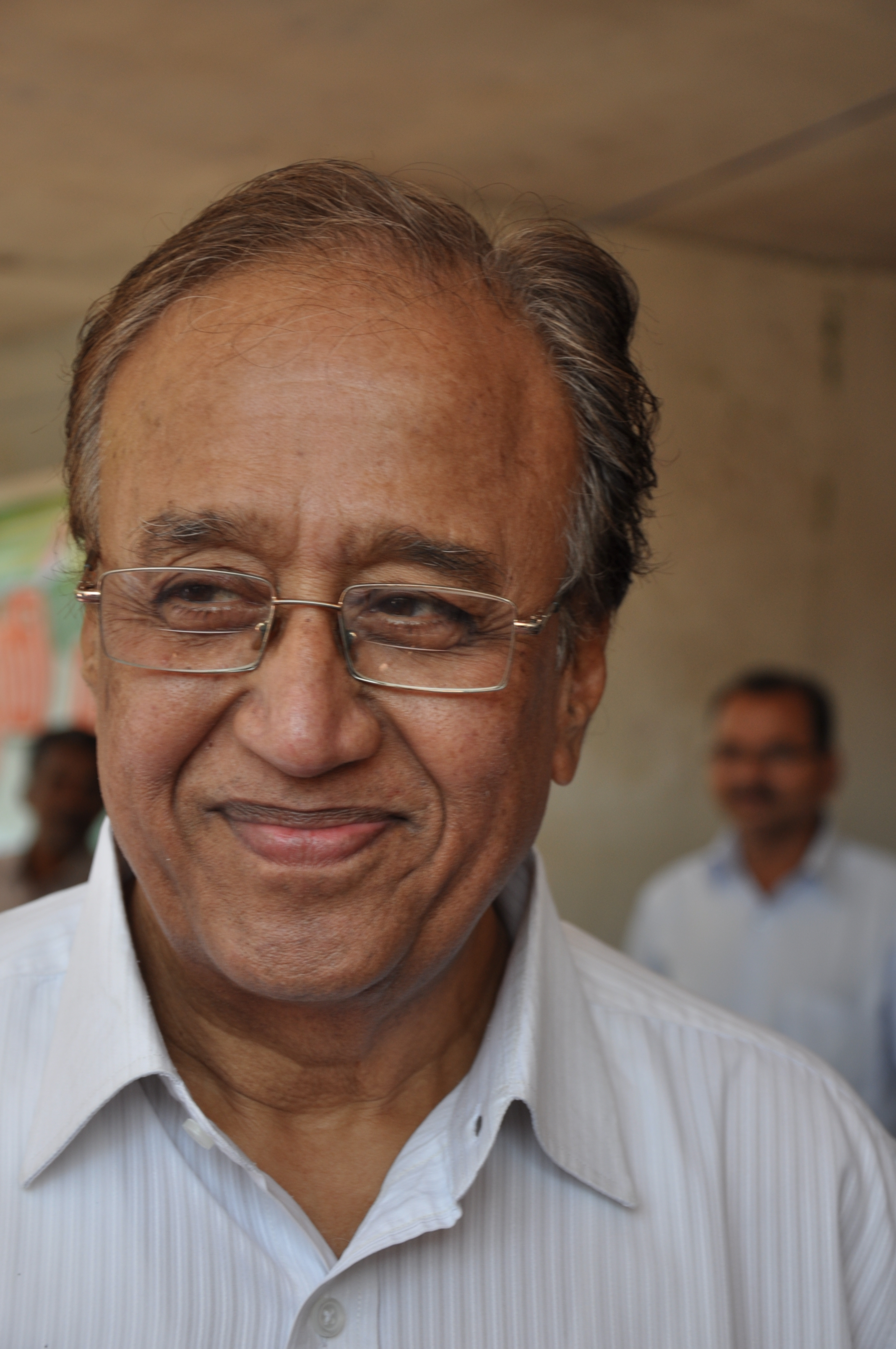

General Secretary of the Communist Party of India
- In office 31 March 2012 – 21 July 2019
- Preceded by: Ardhendu Bhushan Bardhan
- Succeeded by: D. Raja

Member of Parliament
- In office 16 May 2004 – 16 May 2009
- Preceded by: Gutha Sukender Reddy
- Succeeded by: Gutha Sukender Reddy
- Constituency: Nalgonda
- In office 28 February 1998 – 6 October 1999
- Preceded by: Bommagani Dharma Bhiksham
- Succeeded by: Gutha Sukender Reddy
- Constituency: Nalgonda

Personal details
- Born: 25 March 1942 Kondravpally, Kodair mandal, Mahbubnagar, Hyderabad State, India (now Telangana, India)
- Died: 22 August 2025 (aged 83) Hyderabad, Telangana, India
- Party: CPI
- Spouse: Dr. B.V. Vijaya Lakshmi
- Children: 2 sons
- Parent: S. Venkatrami Reddy (father)
- Relatives: Suravaram Pratap Reddy (Uncle)
- Education: Osmania University
- Website: http://suravaram.com/
- As of 26 September, 2006 Source: []

Suravaram Sudhakar Reddy (25 March 1942 – 22 August 2025) was an Indian politician, who was the General Secretary of the Communist Party of India (CPI) from 2012 to 2019. He was a member of the 12th and 14th Lok Sabha of India. He represented the Nalgonda constituency of Telangana.

== Early life ==
Sudhakar Reddy was born on 25 March 1942 in Kondravpally, Mahbubnagar, he was educated in the Municipal High School and Coles Memorial High School in Kurnool.

He did his BA in History from Osmania College, Kurnool, in 1964 and LLB from Osmania University Law College in Hyderabad in the year 1967.

== Political career ==
Sudhakar Reddy began his political career by joining in the All India Students’ Federation (AISF) in 1960, the student wing of the CPI, and became its all-India president in 1970. He was elected to the national council in 1971. He unsuccessfully contested the Assembly elections twice from Kollapur constituency in 1985, 1990 and once from Dhone constituency in 1994 where he was defeated by Kotla Vijaya Bhaskara Reddy.

When he was 15, he became a crucial figure in an agitation seeking blackboards, chalk and books for his school in Kurnool, Andhra Pradesh. The movement spread and schools across Kurnool started raising similar demands. Reddy was later elected twice from the Nalgonda parliamentary constituency to 12th and 14th Lok Sabha. Leader of several mass struggles, and widely admired within the party and outside.

He was elected to serve as General Secretary of Communist Party of India (CPI), on 31 March 2012 in the 21st Party Congress. He had previously served as the Chairman of Parliamentary Standing Committee on Labour, while being a member of the parliament.

== Death ==
Sudhakar Reddy died in Hyderabad on 22 August 2025, at the age of 83. He was survived by wife Vijayalakshmi and two sons Nikhil and Kapil.

As per his wishes, his body will be donated to Gandhi Medical College for medical research and eyes were donated to the LV Prasad Eye Hospital.

== Electoral History ==
=== Lok Sabha ===
| Year | Constituency | Party | Votes | % | Opponent | Party | Votes | % | Result | Margin | % |
|---|---|---|---|---|---|---|---|---|---|---|---|
| 1998 | Nalgonda | CPI | 314,983 | 35.18 | Hanumanthrao.V | INC | 290,528 | 32.44 | Won | +24,455 | +2.73 |
| 1999 | Nalgonda | CPI | 169,097 | 17.79 | Gutha Sukender Reddy | TDP | 427,505 | 44.97 | Lost | −258,408 | −27.18 |
| 2004 | Nalgonda | CPI | 479,511 | 45.76 | Nallu Indrasena Reddy | BJP | 423,360 | 40.40 | Won | +56,151 | +5.36 |
| 2009 | Nalgonda | CPI | 340,867 | 31.60 | Gutha Sukender Reddy | INC | 493,849 | 45.78 | Lost | −152,982 | −14.18 |
