= Uma Gajapathi Raju =

Indian politician

Member of Parliament
- Preceded by: Bhattam Srirama Murthy
- Succeeded by: M. V. V. S. Murthi
- Constituency: Visakhapatnam

Personal details
- Born: 17 November 1953 (age 72) Palghat, Kerala
- Party: Indian National Congress
- Spouse: Pusapati Ananda Gajapathi Raju(divorced) now married to Ramesh Sharma
- Children: 2 daughters (inc. Sanchaita Gajapathi Raju)

Uma Gajapathi Raju is an Indian politician and a former member of the Indian Parliament.

== Personal life ==
Raju was born at Palghat, Kerala on 17 November 1953. She was educated at Madras University. She married Pusapati Ananda Gajapathi Raju on 18 August 1971. They had 2 daughters. They divorced in 1989, and she married filmmaker Ramesh Sharma in 1991. Anand Ganapathi Raju died in 2016.

== Career ==
She is a political and social worker. She was joint secretary of the Andhra Pradesh Congress Committee for one year. Anand Gajapathi Raju, Uma's then husband, was a minister in N. T. Rama Rao's ministry in AP. But in 1989, he resigned from TDP to join Congress before Uma successfully contested the Lok Sabha election the same year. She was elected to the 9th Lok Sabha, in 1989, from Visakhapatnam (Lok Sabha constituency) as a member of the Indian National Congress. She was a member of the Consultative Committee, Ministry of Information and Broadcasting in 1990. In the 1991 Lok Sabha polls, she came second in Visakhapattanam to the TDP candidate.

She was vice-president of the All India Women's Hockey Federation; vice-chairperson, Organising Committee, Freedom Run and Marathon; member, Nehru Cricket Club; vice-president, National Institute of Social Action and National Red Cross Society;

She is interested in flood and drought relief work, promotion of orphanage activities, environmental protection, and malaria eradication programmes.

She was director of the Trade Fair Authority of India; member of the Film Festival Selection Committee for the International Film Festival, 1989; member of the Cultural Sub-Committee, Nehru Implementation Committee. She joined the board of Moving Picture Co. India Ltd. in 1989 and resigned from the board in 2010. She has been the anchor for 8 years of the prime-time news program on Doordarshan called India This Week. She has been the executive producer of many award-winning documentaries, including the Emmy-nominated film The Journalist and the Jihadi—The Murder of Daniel Pearl, directed by her husband Ramesh Sharma.

Her daughter, Sanchaita Gajapathi Raju, was appointed spokesperson of the Delhi unit of BJP in 2018. Sanchaita was also the former chairman of the Simhachalam temple trust board and MANSAS (2020–21)
