= N. Indrasena Reddy =

20th Governor of Tripura (born 1949)

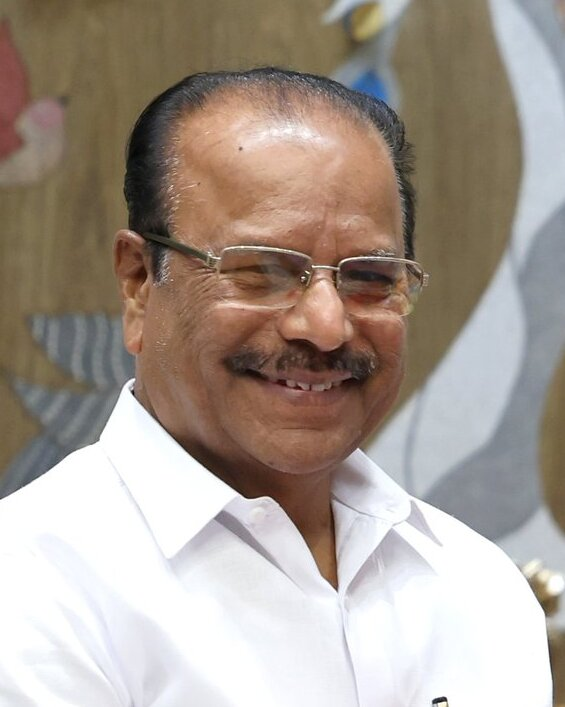
- Reddy in 2024

Governor of Tripura
- Incumbent
- Assumed office 26 October 2023
- Chief Minister: Manik Saha
- Preceded by: Satyadev Narayan Arya

Governor of Mizoram (acting)
- In office 30 Sep 2024 – 9 Oct 2024
- Chief Minister: Lalduhoma
- Preceded by: Kambhampati Hari Babu
- Succeeded by: Kambhampati Hari Babu

8th President of Bharatiya Janata Party, Andhra Pradesh
- In office 2003–2007
- National President: Venkaiah Naidu; L.K. Advani; Rajnath Singh
- Preceded by: C. Ramachandra Reddy
- Succeeded by: Bandaru Dattatreya

Member of Andhra Pradesh Legislative Assembly
- In office 1999–2004
- Preceded by: Malreddy Ranga Reddy
- Succeeded by: Malreddy Ranga Reddy
- Constituency: Malakpet
- In office 1983–1989
- Preceded by: Kandala Prabhakar Reddy
- Succeeded by: P. Sudhir Kumar
- Constituency: Malakpet

Personal details
- Born: Nallu Indrasena Reddy; 1 January 1953 (age 73) Rangareddy, Hyderabad State, India (present-day Telangana)
- Party: Bharatiya Janata Party

Nallu Indrasena Reddy is an Indian politician from Telangana. He is the 20th Governor of Tripura from 2023. He is an ex national secretary of the Bharatiya Janata Party. He was earlier president of the United state unit of the party. Indrasena Reddy was elected as MLA 3 times first in 1983 at the age of 30, in 1985 from Malakpet in Hyderabad and he was elected again in 1999.

Indra Sena Reddy has been appointed Tripura governor on 18 October 2023. He was sworn in as the 20th Governor of Tripura at Raj Bhawan on 26 October 2023.

== Political career ==
- 1983: Member of Legislative Assembly.
- 1985: Member of Legislative Assembly.
- 1999: Member of Legislative Assembly.
- 1999: BJP Floor Leader.
- 2003: BJP Andhra Pradesh President.
- 2014: National secretary for BJP
- 2020: Special Invitee for National Committee.

== Electoral History ==
=== Lok Sabha ===
| Year | Constituency | Party | Votes | % | Opponent | Party | Votes | % | Result | Margin | % |
|---|---|---|---|---|---|---|---|---|---|---|---|
| 1980 | Nalgonda | JP | 42,335 | 9.19 | T. Damodar Reddy | INC(I) | 2,20,952 | 47.99 | Lost | -1,78,617 | -38.80 |
| 1991 | Nalgonda | BJP | 1,52,727 | 22.84 | Bommagani Dharma Biksham | CPI | 2,82,904 | 42.30 | Lost | -1,30,177 | -19.46 |
| 1996 | Nalgonda | BJP | 2,05,579 | 24.62 | Bommagani Dharma Bixam | CPI | 2,77,336 | 33.22 | Lost | -71,757 | -8.60 |
| 1998 | Nalgonda | BJP | 2,74,174 | 30.62 | Suravaram Sudhakar Reddy | CPI | 3,14,983 | 35.18 | Lost | -40,809 | -4.56 |
| 2004 | Nalgonda | BJP | 4,23,360 | 40.40 | Suravaram Sudhakar Reddy | CPI | 4,79,511 | 45.76 | Lost | -56,151 | -5.36 |
| 2009 | Malkajgiri | BJP | 1,30,206 | 10.80 | Sarvey Sathyanarayana | INC | 3,88,368 | 32.21 | Lost | -2,58,162 | -21.41 |
| 2014 | Bhongir | BJP | 1,83,249 | 15.11 | Dr. Boora Narsaiah Goud | TRS | 4,48,164 | 36.95 | Lost | -2,64,915 | -21.84 |

Political offices
| Preceded by Satyadev Narayan Arya | Governor of Tripura; 26 October 2023 – Present | Incumbent |
