= Kolusu Peda Reddaiah =

Indian politician, engineer and industrialist

Kolusu Pedda Reddaiah

Member of Parliament, Lok Sabha
- In office 1991–1996
- Preceded by: Kavuri Samba Siva Rao
- Succeeded by: Kaikala Satyanarayana
- Constituency: Machilipatnam

Member of Legislative Assembly Andhra Pradesh
- In office 1983–1985
- Preceded by: Vadde Sobhanadreeswara Rao
- Succeeded by: Anne Babu Rao
- Constituency: Vuyyuru (constituency delimited, 2008)

Kolusu Peda Reddaiah Yadav(d. 2023) was an Indian politician from Andhra Pradesh. He served as a member of 10th Lok Sabha representing Machilipatnam Lok Sabha constituency as a nominee of Telugu Desam Party. He also served as a member of Andhra Pradesh Legislative Assembly in 1983 - 1985 and again from 1985 - 89 representing Indian National Congress. He last contested in the 2009 Indian general election from Eluru Lok Sabha constituency as a nominee of Praja Rajyam Party and lost.

== Family ==
His son Kolusu Parthasarathy is the current MLA from Nuzvid Assembly constituency and is a minister in the Fourth N. Chandrababu Naidu ministry.
