= Bhimreddy Narasimha Reddy =

Indian freedom fighter and leader of the Telangana Rebellion

Comrade Bheemireddy Narasimha Reddy was a freedom fighter and a leader of the Telangana Rebellion. He is considered as the Telangana Che Guevara, given his rebellion against Rajakars. He belonged to Suryapet district of present-day Telangana.

B. N. Reddy, as he was known, fought the Razakars during the Nizam's rule for six years by being underground. He escaped 10 attempts on his life, prominent among them being an attack against him, his wife and infant son by the Razakars near Mahbubabad in Warangal district. Narasimha Reddy broke the army cordon while exchanging fire and escaped. He also carried out struggles against feudal oppression and bonded labour.

== Career ==
He was a member of the Communist Party of India which led the peasant struggle that is famous as the Telangana Rebellion. The rebellion was led under the banner of Andhra Mahasabha by the Communist Party of India. He was elected thrice to the Lok Sabha from Miryalguda and twice to the Assembly from Suryapet and Tungaturthy in Nalgonda district on the CPI (M) ticket. He, however, quit the CPI (M) in 1998 following differences and floated his own Marxist outfit that was later merged with the Marxist Communist Party of India (MCPI). His long political career spanned six decades.

== Death ==
He died on 9 May 2008.
