= Surendra Reddy =

Indian politician

Member of Parliament, Lok Sabha
- In office 1965–1967
- Preceded by: Etikala Madhusudan Rao
- Constituency: Mahabubabad
- In office 1967–1971
- Preceded by: Bakar Ali Mirza
- Succeeded by: S.B. Giri
- Constituency: Warangal
- In office 1989–1996
- Preceded by: T. Kalpana Devi
- Succeeded by: Azmeera Chandulal
- Constituency: Warangal

Member of the Legislative Assembly
- In office 1978–1989
- Preceded by: N. Ramchandra Reddy
- Succeeded by: Dharamsoth Redya NaikDharamsoth Redya Naik
- Constituency: Dornakal

President of Hyderabad Race Club
- In office 1976–1977
- In office 1983–present

Personal details
- Born: Ramasahayam Surender Reddy; 10 October 1931 (age 94) Maripeda, Mahabubabad (now in Telangana, India)
- Party: Indian National Congress
- Spouse: Jayamala Reddy (m. 1956)
- Children: 3

Ramasahayam Surender Reddy (born 10 October 1931) is a former Indian Member of Parliament and Member of Legislative Assembly who represented Mahabubabad of Andhra State in the 3rd Lok Sabha and Warangal in the 4th, 9th and 10th Lok Sabha.

== Personal life ==
Surender Reddy married Jayamala Reddy on 28 November 1956. They have one son, Ramasahayam Raghuram Reddy, and two daughters. His grandson, Ramasahayam Vinayak Reddy, is married to Aashritha Daggubati, the eldest daughter of actor Daggubati Venkatesh.

== Career ==
=== Political career ===
Surender Reddy joined the Indian National Congress and was elected to the Lok Sabha in 1962 from the Mahabubabad constituency in Andhra State. He was re-elected in 1967 from the Warangal constituency.

In 1978, he was elected to Andhra Pradesh Legislative Assembly from Dornakal and re-elected in 1983, 1985 from same constituency.

He was presented the Rajiv Gandhi Sadbhavana award by All India Congress Committee secretary Rohit Choudhury and V. Hanumantha Rao during Congress leader Rahul Gandhi's 2022 Bharat Jodo Yatra in Hyderabad.

=== Hyderabad Race Club ===
Surender Reddy was elected as Committee Member of Hyderabad Race Club (HRC) in 1974 and elected Chairman in 1976. He was re-elected as chairman in 1983 and has been the longest serving chairman in Indian racing.

=== Other appointments ===
Mr. Reddy has also served as the chairman of the Andhra Pradesh State Finance Corporation and the Director of Andhra Bank, president of the Hyderabad Cricket Association and the Hyderabad Golf Association.
