= J. Chokka Rao =

Indian politician

Member of Parliament, Lok Sabha
- In office 31 December 1984 – 10 May 1996
- Preceded by: Satyanarayana Rao
- Succeeded by: L. Ramana
- Constituency: Karimnagar

Personal details
- Born: 19 July 1923 Karimnagar, Hyderabad State (now in Telangana State), India
- Died: 28 May 1999 (aged 75) Hyderabad, United Andhra Pradesh (now in Telangana State), India
- Party: Indian National Congress
- Education: Osmania University (B.A.)
- Occupation: Politician, Agriculturist

Juvvadi Chokka Rao (19 July 1923 – 28 May 1999) was a political leader of Indian National Congress from Telangana. He served as member of the Lok Sabha representing Karimnagar (Lok Sabha constituency). He was elected to 8th Lok Sabha, 9th Lok Sabha and 10th Lok Sabha.

== Life ==
Chokka Rao was born in Karimnagar district, Hyderabad state (now in Telangana). His political career first started with the cooperative movement in Andhra Pradesh and fighting for the freedom of Hyderabad State.

His tenure in the Lok Sabha was characterized by advocacy for rural and agricultural communities. Prior to his time serving as a Member of Parliament, he served in the Andhra Pradesh Legislative Assembly and held several ministerships, including Minister for Industries, in the Andhra Pradesh government. In foreign policy, Chokka Rao advocated for Tibet and its autonomy during his time in the Lok Sabha.

In honor of his service, the lift irrigation project, J. Chokka Rao Devadula lift irrigation sceheme, was named in his memory.
