= Nalgonda Lok Sabha constituency =

Lok Sabha Constituency in Telangana, India

Coordinates: 17.1°N 79.3°E

Nalgonda TG-13
- Lok Sabha constituency
- Nalgonda Lok Sabha constituency in Telangana

Constituency details
- Country: India
- Region: South India
- State: Telangana
- Assembly constituencies: Devarakonda; Nagarjuna Sagar; Miryalaguda; Huzurnagar; Kodad; Suryapet; Nalgonda
- Established: 1952
- Total electors: 1,495,580
- Reservation: None

Member of Parliament
- 18th Lok Sabha
- Incumbent Raghuveer Reddy Kunduru
- Party: Indian National Congress
- Elected year: 2024

Nalgonda Lok Sabha constituency is one of the 17 Lok Sabha (Lower House of the Parliament) constituencies in Telangana state in southern India.

== Assembly segments ==
The Nalgonda Lok Sabha constituency presently comprises the following Legislative Assembly segments:

No	Name	District	Member	Party	Leading (in 2024)
86	Devarakonda (ST)	Nalgonda	Nenavath Balu Naik	INC	INC
87	Nagarjuna Sagar	Nalgonda	Kunduru Jayaveer Reddy	INC	INC
88	Miryalaguda	Nalgonda	Bathula Laxma Reddy	INC	INC
89	Huzurnagar	Suryapet	Nalamada Uttam Kumar Reddy	INC	INC
90	Kodad	Suryapet	Nalamada Padmavathi Reddy	INC	INC
91	Suryapet	Suryapet	Guntakandla Jagadish Reddy	BRS	INC
92	Nalgonda	Nalgonda	Komatireddy Venkat Reddy	INC	INC

== Members of Parliament ==
Year	Member	Party
Hyderabad State
1952	Sunkam Achalu	People's Democratic Front
1952	Ravi Narayana Reddy	Communist Party of India
Andhra Pradesh
1957	Devulapalli Venkateswar Rao	Communist Party of India
1962	Ravi Narayana Reddy	Communist Party of India
1967	Mohammad Yunus Saleem	Indian National Congress
1971	K. Ramkrishna Reddy	Telangana Praja Samithi
1977	Abdul Lateef	Indian National Congress
1980	T. Damodar Reddy	Indian National Congress
1984	M. Raghuma Reddy	Telugu Desam Party
1989	Chakilam Srinivasa Rao	Indian National Congress
1991	Dharma Bhiksham	Communist Party of India
1996	Dharma Bhiksham	Communist Party of India
1998	Suravaram Sudhakar Reddy	Communist Party of India
1999	Gutha Sukender Reddy	Telugu Desam Party
2004	Suravaram Sudhakar Reddy	Communist Party of India
2009	Gutha Sukender Reddy	Indian National Congress
Telangana
2014	Gutha Sukender Reddy	Indian National Congress
2019	N. Uttam Kumar Reddy	Indian National Congress
2024	Raghuveer Reddy Kunduru	Indian National Congress

== Election results ==
=== 2024 ===
2024 Indian general elections: Nalgonda
Party	Candidate	Votes	%	±%
INC	Kunduru Raghuveer	784,337	60.50	▲15.76
BJP	Saidireddy Shanampudi	224,432	17.31	▲12.83
BRS	Kancharla Krishna Reddy	218,417	16.85	▼25.71
NOTA	None of the above	6,086	0.47	Steady
Majority		559,905	43.19	▲41.01
Turnout		1,296,324	74.02	▼0.13
INC hold		Swing	▲15.76	

=== 2019 ===
2019 Indian general elections: Nalgonda
Party	Candidate	Votes	%	±%
INC	Nalamada Uttam Kumar Reddy	526,028	44.74	+5.05
TRS	Vemireddy Narasimha Reddy	5,00,346	42.56	
BJP	Garlapati Jithendra Kumar	52,709	4.48	
CPI(M)	Mallu Laxmi Nagarjuna Reddy	29,089	2.46	
JSP	Mekala Satheesh Reddy	11,288	0.96	
NOTA	None of the above	5,560	0.47	
Majority		25,682	2.18	
Turnout		11,79,984	74.15	
INC hold		Swing		

=== 2014 ===
2014 Indian general elections: Nalgonda
Party	Candidate	Votes	%	±%
INC	Gutha Sukender Reddy	472,093	39.69	
TDP	Tera Chinnapa Reddy	2,78,937	23.45	
TRS	Dr.Palla Rajeswar Reddy	2,60,677	21.92	
IND.	Marri Nehemiah	56,259	4.72	
CPI(M)	Nandyala Narsimha Reddy	54,423	4.57	
YSRCP	Gunnam Nagi Reddy	39,385	3.31	
Majority		1,93,156	16.24	
Turnout		11,89,399	81.42	+7.28
INC hold		Swing		

=== 2009 ===
General Election, 2009: Nalgonda
Party	Candidate	Votes	%	±%
INC	Gutha Sukender Reddy	493,849	45.78	
CPI	Suravaram Sudhakar Reddy	3,40,867	31.60	
PRP	Paduri Karuna	1,50,275	13.93	
Majority		1,52,983	14.18	
Turnout		10,78,698	74.14	+9.90
INC gain from CPI		Swing		

=== 2004 ===
General Election, 2004: Nalgonda
Party	Candidate	Votes	%	±%
CPI	Suravaram Sudhakar Reddy	479,511	45.76	+27.97
BJP	Indrasena Reddy	4,23,360	40.40	
TRS	Vattipally Srinivas Goud	86,426	8.25	
Majority		56,151	5.36	+32.54
Turnout		10,47,800	65.30	+3.90
CPI gain from TDP		Swing	+29.97	

=== 1999 ===
General Election, 1999: Nalgonda
Party	Candidate	Votes	%	±%
TDP	Gutha Sukender Reddy	427,505	43.6%	
INC	Kanukula Janardhan Reddy	347,770	35.5%	
CPI	Suravaram Sudhakar Reddy	169,097	17.2%	
Majority		79,735	8.1%	
Turnout		980,671	69.2%	
TDP gain from CPI		Swing		

=== 1998 ===
General Election, 1998: Nalgonda
Party	Candidate	Votes	%	±%
CPI	Suravaram Sudhakar Reddy	314,983	34.6%	
INC	V. Hanumantha Rao	290,528	31.9%	
BJP	Indrasena Reddy	274,174	30.1%	
Majority		24,455	2.7%	
Turnout		910,685	65.3%	
CPI hold		Swing		

=== 1996 ===
General Election, 1996: Nalgonda
Party	Candidate	Votes	%	±%
CPI	Dharma Bhiksham	277,336	32.6%	
BJP	Indrasena Reddy	205,579	24.2%	
INC	Gangadhar Tirunagaruu	199,282	23.4%	
Majority		71,757	8.4%	
Turnout		851,118	59.6%	
CPI hold		Swing		

=== 1991 ===
General Election, 1991: Nalgonda
Party	Candidate	Votes	%	±%
CPI	Dharma Bhiksham	282,904	41.1%	
INC	Chakilam Srinivasa Rao	214,327	31.1%	
BJP	Indrasena Reddy	152,727	22.2%	
Majority		68,577	10.0%	
Turnout		688,552	59.6%	
CPI gain from INC		Swing		

=== 1989 ===
1989 Indian general election: Nalgonda
Party	Candidate	Votes	%	±%
INC	Chalilam Srinivasa Rao	357,733	47.99	
CPI	Rama Sharma Bodddupally	3,15,883	42.37	
AIMIM	Khaja Pasha	40,574	5.44	
BSP	Kongari Laxminarayana	17,642	2.37	
Independent	Narsimha Reddy	8,165	1.10	
Independent	Anjaiah Mittapally	3,418	0.46	
Independent	Ravu Venkata Narsimha Rao	2,056	0.28	
Majority		41,850	5.62	
Turnout		7,84,463	68.56	
Swing to INC from TDP		Swing		

=== 1984 ===
1984 Indian general election: Nalgonda
Party	Candidate	Votes	%	±%
TDP	Mallareddy Raguma Reddy	324,973	59.21	
INC	Damodar Reddy Tummalpally	2,10,563	38.37	
Independent	M. Manohar Reddy	5,597	1.02	
Independent	Koneri Yadagiri	3,333	0.61	
Independent	Moosuf Ali Mohammad	1,903	0.35	
Independent	G. Venkateshwar Rao	1,592	0.29	
Independent	Ahmed Mahmood Ali	842	0.15	
Majority		1,14,410	20.84	
Turnout		5,62,575	67.40	
Swing to TDP from INC		Swing		

=== 1980 ===
1980 Indian general election: Nalgonda
Party	Candidate	Votes	%	±%
INC(I)	T. Damodar Reddy	220,952	47.99	
CPI	B. Dharma Bhiksham	1,67,283	36.33	
JP	Indrasena Reddy Nallu	42,335	9.19	
Independent	Mirza Ahmed Baig	17,986	3.91	
Independent	Oruganti Ramulu	10,290	2.23	
Independent	Ramachandaru Rao Palem	1,612	0.35	
Majority		53,669	11.66	
Turnout		4,74,746	64.20	
Swing to INC(I) from INC		Swing		

=== 1977 ===
1977 Indian general election: Nalgonda
Party	Candidate	Votes	%	±%
INC	Mohd. Abdul Lateef	208,892	53.37	
JP	Marepalli Jagan Mohan Reddy	1,01,858	26.03	
CPI	Dharma Bhiksham Bommagani	80,632	20.60	
Majority		1,07,034	27.34	
Turnout		4,03,761	63.98	
Swing to INC from TPS		Swing		

=== 1971 ===
1971 Indian general election: Nalgonda
Party	Candidate	Votes	%	±%
TPS	Kancherla Ram Krishna Reddy	111,704	35.53	
INC	Vedire Narsimha Reddy	1,06,306	33.81	
CPI	B. Dharma Biksham	78,047	24.82	
Independent	Uppunoothula Mallesham	7,795	2.48	
Telangana Congress	Cheera Benkateshwar Rao Yadav	6,861	2.18	
Independent	Sayini Sreesailam	3,687	1.17	
Majority		5,398	1.72	
Turnout		3,23,022	59.36	
Swing to TPS from INC		Swing		

=== 1967 ===
1967 Indian general election: Nalgonda
Party	Candidate	Votes	%	±%
INC	M. Y. Salim	169,953	54.44	
CPI	B. Dharma Bhiksham	77,675	24.88	
CPI	M. V. N. Reddy	40,070	12.84	
ABJS	P. P. Rao	24,465	7.84	
Majority		92,278	29.56	
Turnout		3,24,498	64.04	
Swing to INC from CPI		Swing		

=== 1962 ===
1962 Indian general election: Nalgonda
Party	Candidate	Votes	%	±%
CPI	Ravi Narayana Reddy	159,145	55.86	
INC	Kanchinepalli Pedda Venkatarama Rao	1,25,749	44.14	
Majority		33,396	11.72	
Turnout		2,93,918	65.81	
Swing to CPI from PDF		Swing		

=== 1957 ===
1957 Indian general election: Nalgonda
Party	Candidate	Votes	%	±%
PDF	D. Venkateswar Rao	241,512	28.10	
INC	D. Rajiah	2,12,035	24.67	
INC	Gopu Shouri Reddy	1,87,998	21.87	
PDF	Sunkam Achayya	1,72,247	20.04	
Independent	Kotta Ram Reddy	45,647	5.31	
Majority		29,477	3.43	
Turnout		8,59,439	54.03	
PDF hold		Swing		

=== 1951 ===
1951 Indian general election: Nalgonda
Party	Candidate	Votes	%	±%
PDF	Ravi Narayan Reddy	309,162	38.31	
PDF	Sukam Atchalu	2,82,117	34.96	
INC	P. Mahendranath	96,837	12.00	
INC	V. Bhaskar Rao	86,882	10.77	
RPI	V. Madhava Reddy	32,035	3.97	
Majority		27,045	3.35	
Turnout		8,07,033	55.31	
PDF win (new seat)				

== See also ==
- Nalgonda district
- List of constituencies of the Lok Sabha
