= Chakilam Srinivasa Rao =

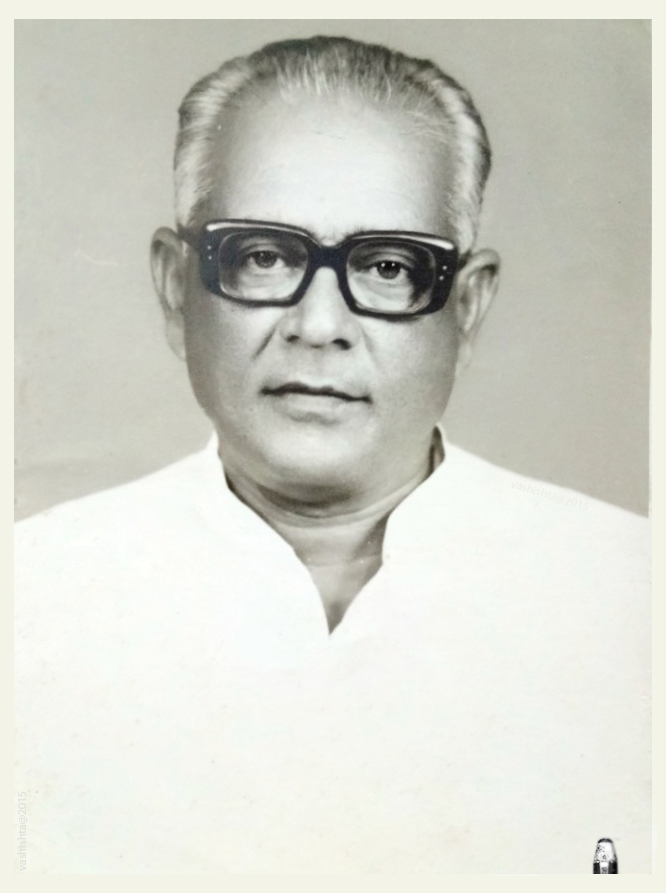
Sardar Chakilam, after a tremendous victory in assembly elections during 1980's

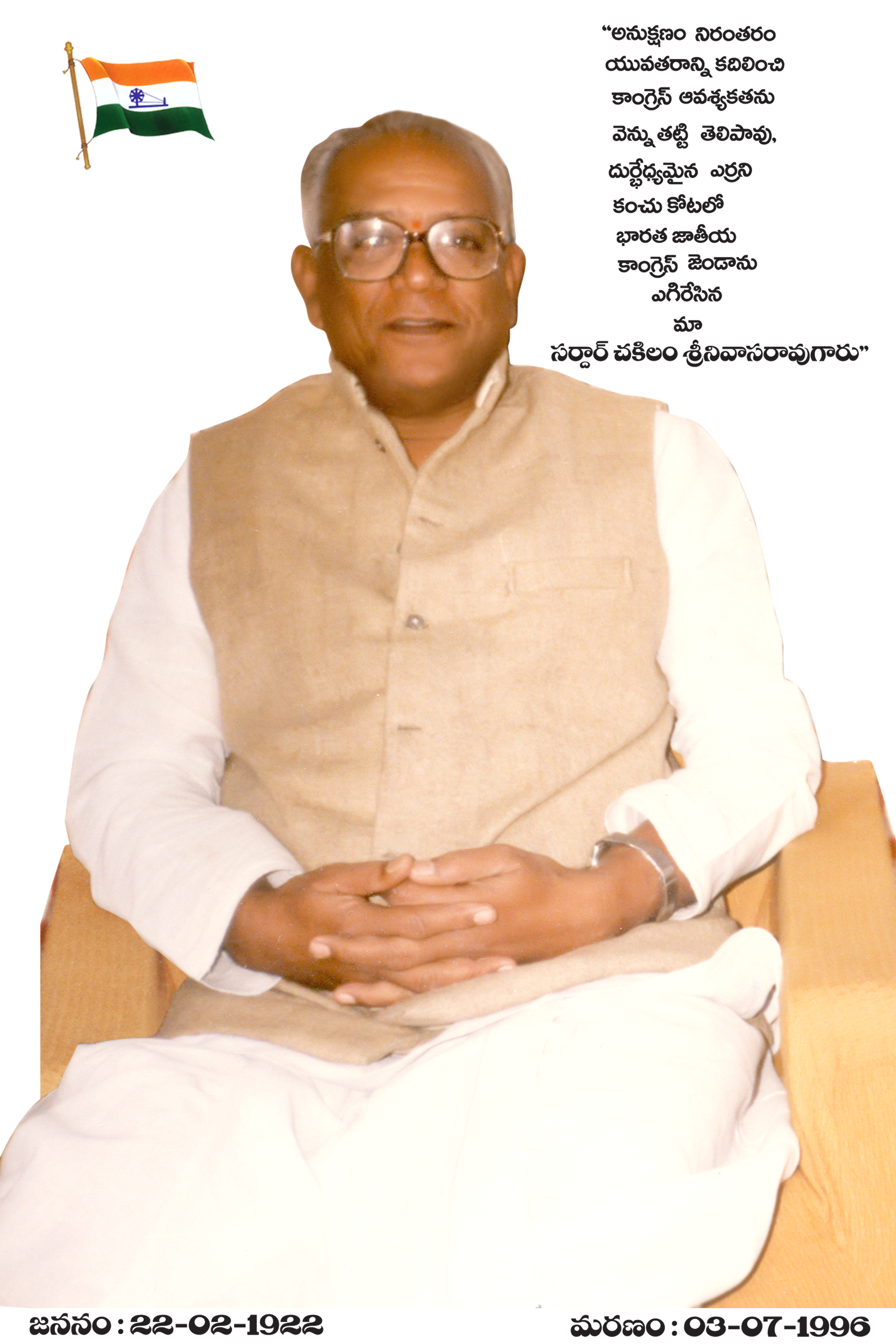
Sardar at Parliament Sessions

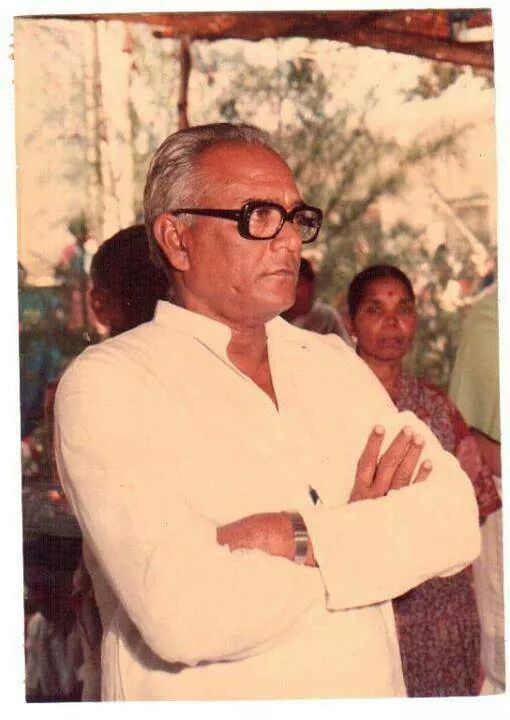
Sardar was conveying thanks to the people, on the eve of the victory of the candidate Sri Pantanghi Vidya Sagar Rao, whom he had supported for Market Committee Chairman Elections During the period 1990's, at Chityala Mandal of Nalgonda Dist, Telangana, India.

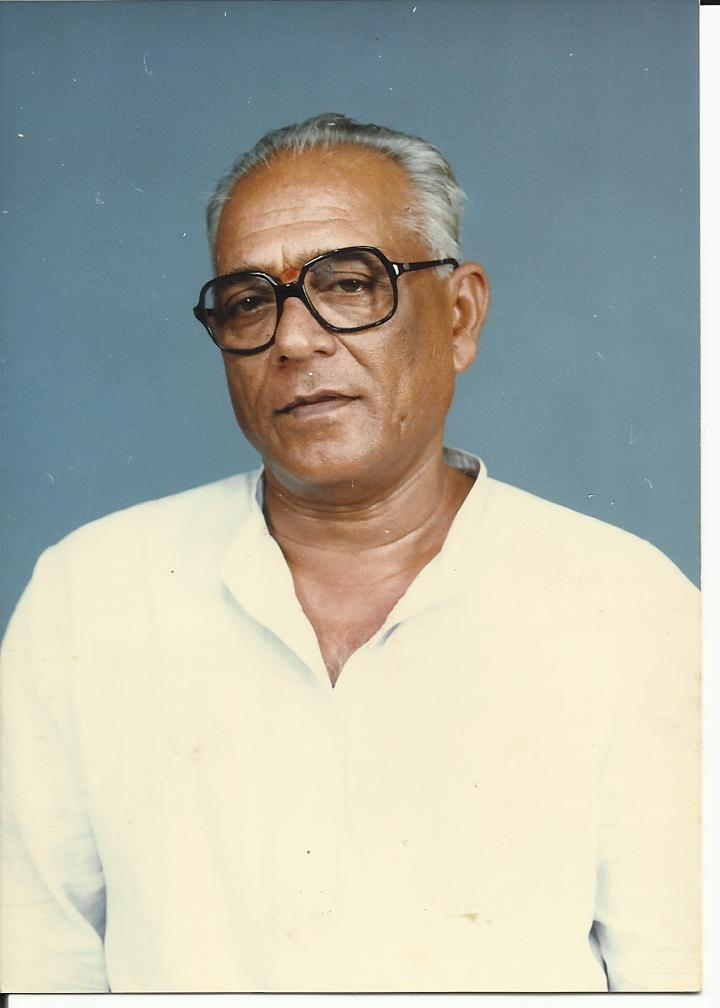
Sardar Chakilam Srinivas Rao. 20 February 1922 – 3 July 1996

Chakilam Srinivasa Rao, also titled as "Sardar" (20 February 1922 – 3 July 1996) was an Indian politician from Andhra Pradesh. He was a three time former member of the Andhra Pradesh Legislative Assembly representing the Indian National Congress from Nalgonda district.

== Early life ==
Rao was born in an orthodox Niyogi Brahmin family, to Chakilam Rama Rao and Chakilam Venkatamma at Vemulapalli village in Nalgonda District on 22 February 1922. He was an eminent social and political personality of 20th century in Nalgonda District of Andhra Pradesh, India. His son Chakilam Anil Kumar is in Nalgonda.

== Career ==
Rao was elected thrice, twice to the state's Legislative Assembly and had also served as Member of Parliament winning from Nalgonda Lok Sabha constituency in 1989. He was elected from the Nalgonda Assembly constituency representing the Indian National Congress Party in the 1967 and 1972 Andhra Pradesh Legislative Assembly election. He was said to be close to the then Prime Minister Indira Gandhi, Rajiv Gandhi and former prime minister PV Narasimha Rao.

He is renowned for breaking the domination of the communists in Nalgonda district when he was first elected. His leadership saw the growth of Congress party in a Communist den. Several attempts were made on his life in early 1960s and 70s. It is said that he was given the title 'Sardar' by people of Nalgonda. He is also lovingly called "Panthulu garu" (pandit ji .

He was a rationalist and a strong believer in self-determination and dignity of labour. His home in Nalgonda was always open to the people.

His anniversary is celebrated by the BRS party in 2021 in Nalgonda. In Nalgonda, the people continue to remember him on his anniversary every year.
