= Amalapuram Lok Sabha constituency =

Lok Sabha Constituency in Andhra Pradesh

Coordinates: 16.6°N 82.0°E

Amalapuram
- Lok Sabha constituency
- Interactive Map Outlining Amalapuram Lok Sabha constituency

Constituency details
- Country: India
- Region: South India
- State: Andhra Pradesh
- Assembly constituencies: Ramachandrapuram; Mummidivaram; Amalapuram; Razole; Gannavaram; Kothapeta; Mandapeta
- Established: 1952
- Reservation: SC

Member of Parliament
- 18th Lok Sabha
- Incumbent Ganti Harish Madhur
- Party: TDP
- Alliance: NDA
- Elected year: 2024
- Preceded by: Chinta Anuradha

Amalapuram is one of the twenty-five lok sabha constituencies of Andhra Pradesh in India. It comprises seven assembly segments in this, six belongs to Konaseema district and one belongs to East Godavari district.

== Assembly segments ==
As per the Delimitation of Parliamentary and Assembly constituencies order (2008), the constituency covers seven assembly segments:

#	Name	District	Member	Party	Leading (in 2024)
42	Ramachandrapuram	Konaseema	Vasamsetti Subhash	TDP	TDP
43	Mummidivaram	Konaseema	Datla Subbaraju	TDP	TDP
44	Amalapuram(SC)	Konaseema	Aithabathula Anandarao	TDP	TDP
45	Razole(SC)	Konaseema	Deva Varaprasad	JSP	TDP
46	Gannavaram(SC)	Konaseema	Giddi Satyanarayana	JSP	TDP
47	Kothapeta	Konaseema	Bandaru Satyananda Rao	TDP	TDP
48	Mandapeta	East Godavari	V. Jogeswara Rao	TDP	TDP

== Members of Parliament ==
^ indicates by-election

Year	Winner	Party
1957	Kaneti Mohana Rao	Communist Party of India
1962	Bayya Suryanarayana Murthy	Indian National Congress
1967	Bayya Suryanarayana Murthy	Indian National Congress
1971	Bayya Suryanarayana Murthy	Indian National Congress
1977	Kusuma Krishna Murthy	Indian National Congress
1980	Kusuma Krishna Murthy	Indian National Congress
1984	A. J. Venkata Butchi Maheshwara Rao	Telugu Desam Party
1989	Kusuma Krishna Murthy	Indian National Congress
1991	G. M. C. Balayogi	Telugu Desam Party
1996	K. S. R. Murthy	Indian National Congress
1998	G. M. C. Balayogi	Telugu Desam Party
1999	G. M. C. Balayogi	Telugu Desam Party
^2002	Ganti Vijaya Kumari	Telugu Desam Party
2004	G. V. Harsha Kumar	Indian National Congress
2009	G. V. Harsha Kumar	Indian National Congress
2014	Pandula Ravindra Babu	Telugu Desam Party
2019	Chintha Anuradha	YSR Congress Party
2024	Ganti Harish Madhur	Telugu Desam Party

== Election results ==
=== General Election 1989 ===
1989 General Election: Amalapuram
Party	Candidate	Votes	%	±%
INC	Kusuma Krishna Murthy	339,419	53.68	▲15.53
TDP	Aithabathula Jogeswara Venkata Butchi	284,638	45.02	▼16.22
Majority		54,781	8.66	
Turnout		632,287	75.66	▲1.04
INC gain from TDP		Swing		

=== General Election 1991 ===
1991 General Election: Amalapuram
Party	Candidate	Votes	%	±%
TDP	G. M. C. Balayogi	273,490	53.19	▲8.17
INC	Kusuma Krishna Murthy	186,003	36.18	▼17.50
Majority		87,487	17.01	
Turnout		514,144	61.48	▼14.18
TDP gain from INC		Swing		

=== General Election 1996 ===
1996 General Election: Amalapuram
Party	Candidate	Votes	%	±%
INC	K. S. R. Murthy	245,477	39.51	+3.33
TDP	G. M. C. Balayogi	216,346	34.82	−18.37
NTRTDP(LP)	Babu Mohan Palli	143,718	23.13	
Majority		29,131	4.69	
Turnout		621,325	68.39	+6.91
INC gain from TDP		Swing		

=== General Election 1998 ===
1998 General Election: Amalapuram
Party	Candidate	Votes	%	±%
TDP	G. M. C. Balayogi	286,953	43.57	+8.75
INC	K. S. R. Murthy	196,713	29.87	−9.64
BJP	Umamaheswara Rao Kommabathula	172,301	26.16	
Majority		90,240	13.70	
Turnout		658,569	73.39	+5.00
TDP gain from INC		Swing		

=== General Election 1999 ===
1999 General Election: Amalapuram
Party	Candidate	Votes	%	±%
TDP	G. M. C. Balayogi	368,476	55.56	+11.99
INC	Gollapalli Suryarao	249,597	37.63	+7.76
Majority		118,879	17.93	
Turnout		663,249	73.02	−0.37
TDP hold		Swing		

=== By-election 2002 ===
2002 by-election : Amalapuram
Party	Candidate	Votes	%	±%
TDP	Vijaya Kumari Ganti	341,923	90.82	
BSP	J. B. Raju	28,263	7.50	
Independent	P. Vijaya Chakravarthi	6,271	1.66	
Majority		3,13,660	83.32	
Turnout		3,76,457	37.73	
Registered electors		9,97,557		
TDP hold		Swing		

=== General Election 2004 ===
2004 General Election: Amalapuram
Party	Candidate	Votes	%	±%
INC	G. V. Harsha Kumar	350,346	49.75	▲12.12
TDP	Janardhana Rao Dunna	308,861	43.86	▼11.70
Independent	Bhupati Muneeswara Rao	26,699	3.79	N/A
Independent	Ramesh Yalangi	9,550	1.36	N/A
BSP	D. Muralikrishna	8,768	1.25	N/A
Majority		41,485	5.89	▼12.04
Turnout		704,224	74.59	▼0.85
INC gain from TDP		Swing		

=== General Election 2009 ===
2009 General Election: Amalapuram
Party	Candidate	Votes	%	±%
INC	G. V. Harsha Kumar	368,501	35.99	▼13.76
PRP	Pothula Prameela Devi	328,496	32.09	New
TDP	Gedela Varalakshmi	264,524	25.84	▼18.02
Majority		40,005	3.90	▼1.99
Turnout		1,023,765	80.28	▲2.20
INC hold		Swing	▼13.76	

=== General Election 2014 ===
2014 General Election: Amalapuram
Party	Candidate	Votes	%	±%
TDP	Pandula Ravindra Babu	594,547	53.04	▲27.20
YSRCP	Pinipe Viswarupu	473,971	42.28	New
INC	A. J. V. Butchi Maheswara Rao	12,182	1.09	▼34.90
JSP	G. V. Harsha Kumar	9,931	0.89	New
BSP	Geddam Sampada Rao	7,219	0.64	N/A
NOTA	None of the Above	6,141	0.55	N/A
Majority		120,576	10.76	▲6.86
Turnout		1,120,927	82.55	▲2.27
TDP gain from INC		Swing		

=== 2019 ===
2019 Indian general elections: Amalapuram
Party	Candidate	Votes	%	±%
YSRCP	Chinta Anuradha	485,313	39.43	▼2.85
TDP	Ganti Harish Madhur	4,45,347	36.18	▼16.86
JSP	D. M. R. Sekhar	2,54,848	20.70	N/A
BJP	Ayyaji Vema Manepalli	11,516	0.94	N/A
Majority		39,966	3.24	▼7.52
Turnout		12,35,368	84.64	▼2.09
Registered electors		14,59,556		
YSRCP gain from TDP		Swing		

=== 2024 ===
2024 Indian general elections: Amalapuram
Party	Candidate	Votes	%	±%
TDP	Ganti Harish Madhur	796,981	61.25	+25.07
YSRCP	Rapaka Vara Prasada Rao	454,785	34.95	−4.48
INC	Janga Goutham	15,082	1.16	
NOTA	None Of The Above	13,518	1.04	
Majority		3,42,196		
Turnout		13,01,934	84.97	
TDP gain from YSRCP		Swing		

== See also ==
- List of constituencies of the Andhra Pradesh Legislative Assembly
