= Mummidivaram Assembly constituency =

Constituency of the Andhra Pradesh Legislative Assembly, India

Coordinates: 16.64°N 82.10°E

Mummidivaram
- Constituency No. 43 for the Andhra Pradesh Legislative Assembly
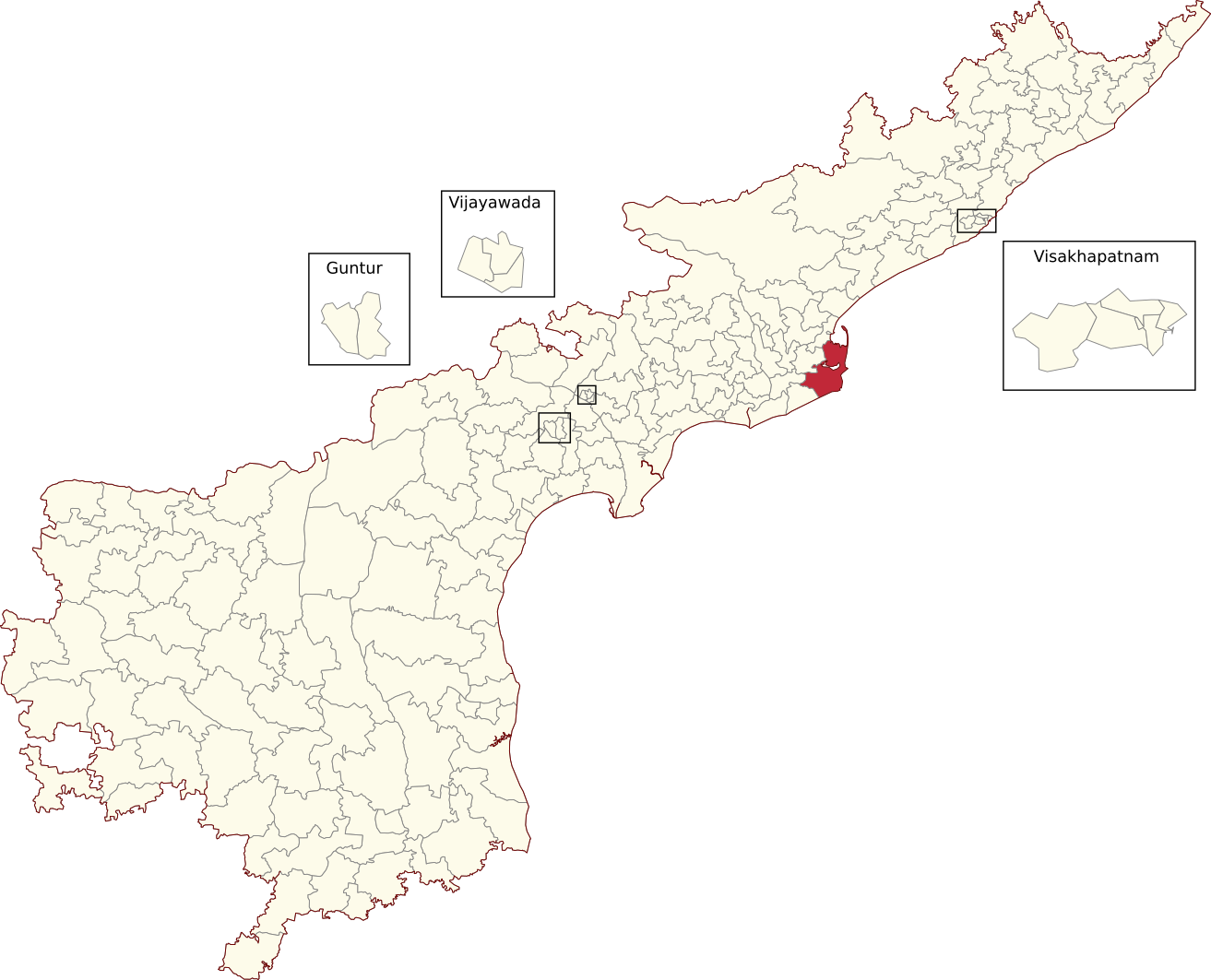
- Location of Mummidivaram Assembly constituency within Andhra Pradesh

Constituency details
- Country: India
- Region: South India
- State: Andhra Pradesh
- District: Konaseema
- Lok Sabha constituency: Amalapuram
- Established: 1978
- Total electors: 229,431
- Reservation: None

Member of Legislative Assembly
- 16th Andhra Pradesh Legislative Assembly
- Incumbent Datla Subba Raju (Buchi Babu)
- Party: TDP
- Alliance: NDA
- Elected year: 2024

Mummidivaram Assembly constituency is a constituency in Konaseema district of Andhra Pradesh that elects representatives to the Andhra Pradesh Legislative Assembly in India. It is one of the seven assembly segments of Amalapuram Lok Sabha constituency.

Ponnada Venkata Satish Kumar is the current MLA of the constituency, having won the 2019 Andhra Pradesh Legislative Assembly election from YSR Congress Party. As of 2019, there are a total of 229,431 electors in the constituency. The constituency was established in 1951, as per the Delimitation Orders (1978).

== Mandals ==
The four mandals that form the assembly constituency are:

Mandal
Island Polavaram
Mummidivaram
Thallarevu
Katrenikona

== Members of the Legislative Assembly ==
Year	Member	Political party
1978	Moka Sri Vishnu Prasada Rao	Indian National Congress (I)
1983	Valtati Rajaskkubai	Telugu Desam Party
1985	Pandu Krishna Murty	Telugu Desam Party
1989	Battina Subbarao	Indian National Congress
1994	Battina Subbarao	Indian National Congress
1996 by-election	G. M. C. Balayogi	Telugu Desam Party
1998 by-election	Chelli Vivekananda	Telugu Desam Party
1999	Chelli Vivekananda	Telugu Desam Party
2004	Pinipe Viswarup	Indian National Congress
2009	Ponnada Venkata Satish Kumar	Indian National Congress
2014	Datla Subbaraju (Buchi Babu)	Telugu Desam Party
2019	Ponnada Venkata Satish Kumar	YSR Congress Party
2024	Datla Subbaraju (Buchi Babu)	Telugu Desam Party

== Election results ==
=== 2024 ===
2024 Andhra Pradesh Legislative Assembly election: Mummidivaram
Party	Candidate	Votes	%	±%
TDP	Datla Subbaraju	118,687	57.25	
YSRCP	Ponnada Venkata Satish Kumar	79,951	38.56	
Majority		38,736	18.68	
Turnout		2,07,321		
TDP gain from YSRCP		Swing		

=== 2019 ===
2019 Andhra Pradesh Legislative Assembly election: Mummidivaram
Party	Candidate	Votes	%	±%
YSRCP	Ponnada Venkata Satish Kumar	78,522	40.89	+1.24
TDP	Datla Subba Raju (Bucchi raju)	72,975	38.00	−15.12
JSP	Pithani Balakrishna	33,334	17.36	
Majority		5,547	2.89	
Turnout		1,92,043		
YSRCP gain from TDP		Swing		

=== 2014 ===
2014 Andhra Pradesh Legislative Assembly election: Mummidivaram
Party	Candidate	Votes	%	±%
TDP	Datla Subba Raju (Buchi babu)	99,274	56.68	
YSRCP	Guthula Venkata Sai Srinivasa Rao	68,736	39.65	
Majority		29,538	17.03	
Turnout		173,378	83.28	+3.54
TDP gain from INC		Swing		

=== 2009 ===
2009 Andhra Pradesh state assembly elections: Mummidivaram
Party	Candidate	Votes	%	±%
INC	Ponnada Venkata Satish Kumar	51,087	33.33	−20.82
TDP	Srinivasa Raju Nadimpalli]	49,162	32.08	−6.60
PRP	Suryanarayana Kudupudi	31,400	20.49	
Majority		1,925	1.25	
Turnout		153,269	79.74	+6.18
INC hold		Swing		

=== 2004 ===
2004 Andhra Pradesh Legislative Assembly election: Mummidivaram
Party	Candidate	Votes	%	±%
INC	Pinipe Viswarup	53,759	54.15	+11.00
TDP	Chelli Seshakumari	38,402	38.68	−15.65
Majority		15,357	15.47	
Turnout		99,282	73.56	+2.39
INC gain from TDP		Swing		

=== 1999 ===
1999 Andhra Pradesh state assembly elections: Mummidivaram
Party	Candidate	Votes	%	±%
TDP	Chelli Vivekananda	52,215	54.3	▼6.43
INC	Viswarupu Penipe]	41,473	43.2	▲4.13
Independent	Pedapudi Rao	1,050	1.1	
Anna Telugu Desam Party	Bandili Raju	725	0.8	
Ajeya Bharat Party	Savarapu Krupanandam	595	0.6	
Independent	Bhyravamurthy Yelepe	51	0.1	
Majority		10,742	10.9	▼10.76
Turnout		98,373	72.9	▲11.5
TDP hold		Swing		

=== 1998 by-election ===
1998 Andhra Pradesh state assembly 1998 by-election: Mummidivaram
Party	Candidate	Votes	%	±%
TDP	Chelli Vivekananda	49,852	60.73	▲14.25
INC	Viswarupu Pinipe]	32,074	39.07	▲7.06
Independent	M. M. Ananda Sagar	168	0.2	
Majority		17,778	21.66	▲7.19
Turnout		82,805	61.4	▼12.9
TDP hold		Swing		

=== 1996 by-election ===
1996 Andhra Pradesh state assembly by-election: Mummidivaram
Party	Candidate	Votes	%	±%
TDP	G. M. C. Balayogi	46,562	46.48	▲4.48
INC	Gollapallil Rao]	32,066	32.01	▲20.19
NTRTDP(LP)	Babumohan Palli	15,309	15.28	
Independent	Ratnam Lanka	5,316	5.31	
BSP	Pulagala Rao	656	0.65	▼1.05
Independent	P V Chakravarthi	274	0.27	
Majority		14,496	14.47	▲4.47
Turnout		101,674	74.3	▲0.2
TDP gain from INC		Swing		

=== 1994 ===
1994 Andhra Pradesh state assembly elections: Mummidivaram
Party	Candidate	Votes	%	±%
INC	Battina Subbarao	49,090	52.2	▲0.3
TDP	Anand Sagar Moka	39,525	42	▼2.6
Independent	N.M. Rushi	2,503	2.7	
BSP	T. Kamala	1,567	1.7	
BJP	Revu Prasad	1,035	1.1	
Independent	Kannedi Rao	196	0.2	
Independent	Gurrala Veeraraghavalu	170	0.2	▼0.8
Majority		9,565	10.0	▲2.9
Turnout		95,975	74.1	▲0.9
INC hold		Swing		

=== 1989 ===
1989 Andhra Pradesh state assembly elections: Mummidivaram
Party	Candidate	Votes	%	±%
INC	Battina Subbarao	47,989	51.9	▲33.3
TDP	Pandu Krishnamurty (incumbent)	41,240	44.6	▼19.2
Independent	Neelam Apparao	2,345	2.5	
Independent	Gurrala Veerraghavulu	936	1.0	
Majority		6,749	7.1	▼37.5
Turnout		95,640	73.2	▲6.7
INC gain from TDP		Swing		

=== 1985 ===
1985 Andhra Pradesh state assembly elections: Mummidivaram
Party	Candidate	Votes	%	±%
TDP	Pandu Krishna Murty	46,779	63.8	▼5
INC	Kurm Geddam]	13,655	18.6	▼1.7
Independent	N. M. Rushi	9,855	13.4	
Independent	Yarlagedda Ratnam	2,528	3.5	
Independent	Badugu William	505	0.7	
Majority		33,124	44.6	▼3.1
Turnout		74,225	66.5	▼4
TDP hold		Swing		

=== 1983 ===
1983 Andhra Pradesh state assembly elections: Mummidivaram
Party	Candidate	Votes	%	±%
TDP	Valtati Rajaskkubai	51,366	68.8	
INC	Sri Moka	15,167	20.3	▼31.7
Independent	Giddi Vankataratanma	5,183	6.9	
Independent	Pedapuri Rao	1,924	2.6	
INC(J)	Kamidi Satyam	626	0.8	
Independent	Narasimha Komki	431	0.6	
Majority		36,199	47.7	▲29.9
Turnout		75,818	70.5	▼0.4
TDP gain from INC(I)		Swing		

=== 1978 ===
1978 Andhra Pradesh Legislative Assembly election: Mummidivaram
Party	Candidate	Votes	%	±%
INC(I)	Moka Rao	37,919	52	
JP	Appalaswamy Bojja]	24,691	33.9	
INC	Kasi Rao	7,788	10.7	
Independent	Kasi Sumangali	1,635	2.2	
Independent	Chuttugulla Swami	908	1.2	
Majority		13,228	17.8	
Turnout		74,221	70.9	
INC(I) win (new seat)				

== See also ==
- List of constituencies of the Andhra Pradesh Legislative Assembly
