= Polavaram =

Polavaram may refer to:

- Polavaram district, a district in Andhra Pradesh
- Polavaram, Eluru district, a village in Andhra Pradesh
- Palavaram, Eluru district, a village in Andhra Pradesh
- I. Polavaram, East Godavari district, a village in Andhra Pradesh
- I. Polavaram mandal, the mandal containing I. Polavaram village
- Polavaram Assembly constituency, a constituency of the Andhra Pradesh Legislative Assembly
- Polavaram mandal, the mandal containing the village of Polavaram, Eluru district
- Polavaram Estate, a Zamindari estate in the Godavari district of the Madras Presidency
- Polavaram Project, a multipurpose irrigation project
