= Gollapalli Surya Rao =

Indian politician (born 1950)

Gollapalli Surya Rao (born 1950) is an Indian politician from Andhra Pradesh. He was a former member of the Andhra Pradesh Legislative Assembly from Razole Assembly constituency, which was reserved for Scheduled Caste community in East Godavari district. He won the 2014 election representing the Telugu Desam Party.

== Early life ==
Rao is from Kothapeta, East Godavari district, Andhra Pradesh. He is the son of the late Appa Rao. He completed his MA at Acharya Nagarjuna University and then did his LLB at Rajiv Gandhi Institute of Law, Andhra University in 2012. he is an advocate and his wife is a teacher. He declared assets worth Rs. 68 lakhs in 2014, in his affidavit to the Election Commission of India.

== Career ==
Rao was first elected as an MLA winning the Allavaram constituency which was reserved for SC community in the 1985 Andhra Pradesh Legislative Assembly election representing the Telugu Desam Party. In 1985, he polled 28,358 votes and defeated his closest rival, Yelamanchill Satyanarayana of the Indian National Congress, by a margin of 3,529 votes. Later, he left TDP and was elected as an MLA on an Indian National Congress ticket in the 2004 Andhra Pradesh Legislative Assembly election from the then Allavaram constituency. In 2004, he polled 45,948 votes and defeated his nearest rival, Pandu Swarupa Rani of the Telugu Desam Party, by a margin of 6,490 votes. He served as a minister in the NTR cabinet as a TDP legislator and then in the YSR cabinet as a Congress legislator. Later, he joined the Telugu Desam Party after the bifurcation of Andhra Pradesh in 2014.

He won from Razole Assembly constituency in the 2014 Andhra Pradesh Legislative Assembly election representing the Telugu Desam Party. He polled 66,960 votes and defeated his nearest rival, Bonthu Rajeswara Rao of the YSR Congress Party, by a margin of 4,683 votes. In the 2019 Assembly election, he contested again on the Telugu Desam Party ticket but finished third behind winner Rapaka Prabhakara Rao of Jana Sena party and Bonthu Rajeswara Rao of the YSR Congress Party, who came second. Later in February 2024, he shifted to the YSR Congress party but lost the 2024 election on YSRCP ticket to Deva Varaprasad of Jana Sena Party.
