= G. M. Harish Balayogi =

Indian politician

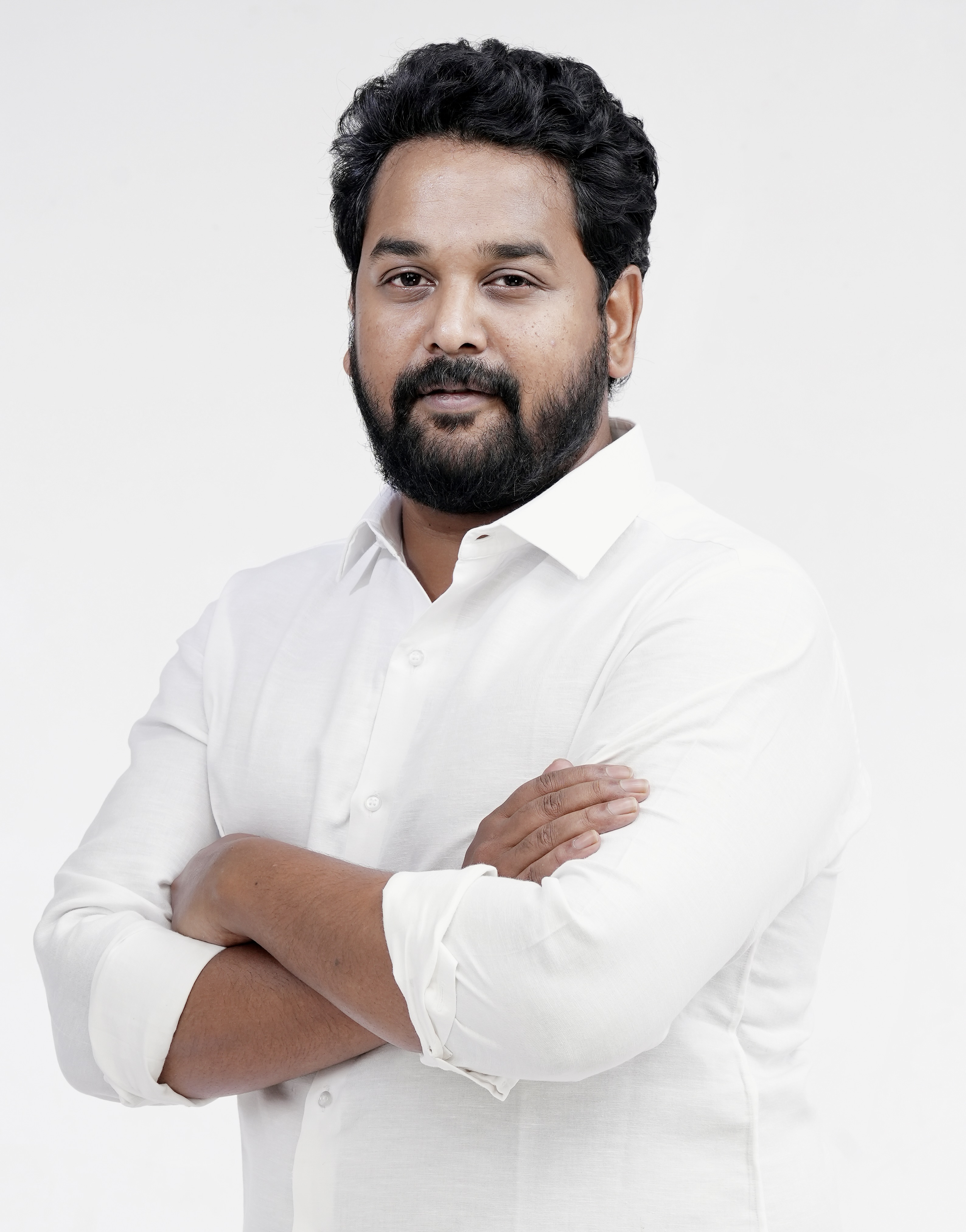
- Harish in 2024

Member of Parliament, Lok Sabha
- Incumbent
- Assumed office 4 June 2024
- Constituency: Amalapuram
- Preceded by: Chinta Anuradha

Personal details
- Born: March 22, 1991 (age 35) Kakinada, Andhra Pradesh, India
- Party: Telugu Desam Party
- Parents: G. M. C. Balayogi (father); Ganti Vijaya Kumari (mother)
- Education: Bachelor of Business Management, GITAM University, Visakhapatnam
- Occupation: Politician

G. M. Harish Balayogi is an Indian politician from Andhra Pradesh. He is a Member of Parliament in the 18th Lok Sabha, representing the Amalapuram Lok Sabha constituency. He also serves as a party whip in the Lok Sabha.

He is the son of G. M. C. Balayogi, who served as the speaker of the 12th Lok Sabha until his untimely death in a helicopter crash. Both his father and mother have represented the Amalapuram Lok Sabha constituency as Members of Parliament. He is currently a member of the Telugu Desam Party.

== Early life and education ==
G. M. Harish Balayogi was born on 22 March 1991 in Kakinada, Andhra Pradesh. He completed his schooling at Vishakha Valley School, Visakhapatnam, and obtained a Bachelor of Business Management degree from GITAM University, Visakhapatnam.

Before entering politics, he worked in the private sector as a technical associate at Goldstone Technologies from 2012 to 2015 and Nfinity from 2015 to 2017.

== Politics ==
G. M. Harish Balayogi started his political career with the Telugu Desam Party (TDP) in 2017. He contested the 2019 Indian general election from the Amalapuram Lok Sabha constituency as a TDP candidate and lost to Chinta Anuradha of the YSR Congress Party (YSRCP) by a margin of 39,966 votes. In the 2024 Indian general election, he again contested from the same constituency and won by a margin of 342,196 votes, defeating Rapaka Vara Prasada Rao of YSRCP. In June 2024, he was appointed as the Telugu Desam Parliamentary Party whip.

As a first-term MP, Harish has been an active participant in parliamentary proceedings. He has participated in 16 debates and has raised 107 questions in the 18th Lok Sabha. He is also a member of the following committees :

- Member, Joint Committee on the Constitution (One Hundred and Twenty-Ninth Amendment) Bill, 2024 and the Union Territories Laws (Amendment) Bill, 2024
- Member, Standing Committee on Labour, Textiles and Skill Development

Harish has spoken on issues ranging from agriculture and aquaculture to infrastructure development, sports, and constitutional matters. A full list of his debates is below:

Date	Debate title/Bill name
18.08.2025	Regarding the establishment of a second campus of the National Institute of Water Sports in Konaseema district, Andhra Pradesh
04.08.2025	Regarding the need to consider Konaseema district in Andhra Pradesh as a regular centre for entrance and recruitment examinations
29.07.2025	Regarding the need to operationalise and promote the Coconut Farmer Producer Organisations in Konaseema and other districts of Andhra Pradesh
21.03.2025	Discussion on the Demands for Grants Nos. 1 and 2 under the control of the Ministry of Agriculture and Farmers Welfare
19.03.2025	Regarding the need to undertake extensive awareness campaigns and training programmes to promote sustainable aquaculture in Andhra Pradesh
19.03.2025	Discussion on the Demands for Grants Nos. 62 and 63 under the control of the Ministry of Jal Shakti
17.03.2025	Discussion on the Demands for Grants No. 85 under the control of the Ministry of Railways
04.02.2025	Motion of Thanks on the President's Address
17.12.2024	Regarding the need to promote Education for All in Andhra Pradesh
14.12.2024	Discussion on the glorious journey of 75 years of the Constitution of India
04.12.2024	Regarding comprehensive execution of Pradhan Mantri Matsya Sampada Yojana in Konaseema region of Andhra Pradesh
04.12.2024	The Railways (Amendment) Bill, 2024
08.08.2024	Submission on the introduction of The Waqf (Amendment) Bill, 2024
08.08.2024	Regarding the need to set up a National Coir Training and Design Centre in Dr. B.R. Ambedkar Konaseema district of Andhra Pradesh
24.07.2024	Urge upon the minister to allocate the necessary funds for the completion of the railway line between Kotipalli and Kakinada
22.07.2024	Discussion on India's preparedness for the upcoming Olympic Games

In May 2025, he was part of an all-party parliamentary delegation headed by Shashi Tharoor that travelled to the United States, Panama, Guyana, Brazil and Colombia to brief the respective heads of state and important dignitaries on the 2025 Pahalgam attack and subsequent Operation Sindoor.

== Public Image and Media ==
G. M. Harish Balayogi has written opinion pieces in national media pertaining to technology and MSME, namely "Making India For The World: Boosting MSME Exports via E-Commerce" and "Strengthening India's Tax Sovereignty in the Age of Crypto: The Case for Swift CARF Implementation."

== Electoral history ==
Election results
Year	Office	Constituency	Party	Votes	%	Opponent	Party	Votes	%	Result	Ref
2019	MP	Amalapuram	Telugu Desam Party	445,347	36.18	Chinta Anuradha	YSR Congress Party	485,313	39.43	Lost	
2024	MP	Amalapuram	Telugu Desam Party	796,981	61.25	Rapaka Vara Prasada Rao	YSR Congress Party	454,785	34.95	Won	
