= Pinipe Viswarup =

Indian politician

Minister of Transport Government of Andhra Pradesh
- In office 11 April 2022 – 4 June 2024
- Governor: Biswabhusan Harichandan; S. Abdul Nazeer
- Chief Minister: Y. S. Jagan Mohan Reddy
- Preceded by: Perni Nani

Minister for Social Welfare Government of Andhra Pradesh
- In office 30 May 2019 – 7 April 2022
- Governor: E. S. L. Narasimhan; Biswabhusan Harichandan
- Chief Minister: Y. S. Jagan Mohan Reddy
- Preceded by: Nakka Anand Babu
- Succeeded by: Merugu Nagarjuna

Minister for Animal Husbandry, Dairy development, Fisheries & Veterinary University Government of Andhra Pradesh
- In office 25 November 2010 – 28 September 2013
- Governor: E. S. L. Narasimhan
- Chief Minister: Nallari Kiran Kumar Reddy
- Preceded by: Kolusu Parthasarathy
- Succeeded by: Thota Narasimham

Minister of Rural Water Supply Government of Andhra Pradesh
- In office 25 May 2009 – 24 November 2010
- Governor: N. D. Tiwari; E. S. L. Narasimhan
- Chief Minister: Y. S. Rajasekhara Reddy; Konijeti Rosaiah
- Preceded by: Pinnamaneni Venkateswar Rao
- Succeeded by: Mandali Buddha Prasad

Member of Legislative Assembly Andhra Pradesh
- In office 23 May 2019 – 4 June 2024
- Preceded by: Aithabathula Anandarao
- Succeeded by: Aithabathula Anandarao
- Constituency: Amalapuram
- In office 2009–2014
- Preceded by: Chittabbai Kudupudi
- Succeeded by: Aithabathula Anandarao
- Constituency: Amalapuram
- In office 2004–2009
- Preceded by: Chelli Vivekananda
- Succeeded by: Ponnada Venkata Satish Kumar
- Constituency: Mummidivaram

Personal details
- Born: 2 October 1962 (age 63) Nadavapalli
- Party: YSR Congress Party
- Other political affiliations: Indian National Congress

Pinipe Viswarup (born on 2 October 1962) is an Indian politician from Andhra Pradesh. He worked as a Minister in the cabinets of three chief ministers, YS Rajasekhara Reddy, Rosaiah and Kiran Kumar Reddy. He is an active member of YSR Congress Party and was a supporter of Samaikyandhra movement.

== Early life and education ==
Viswarup was born in Nadavapalli village of East Godavari district to Reddy Panthulu and Seethamma. He did his schooling in Eluru and completed B.Sc., B.Ed. in Bombay. He was active in student politics during his college life and later entered into mainstream politics. He married Meenakshi.

== Career ==
Viswarup was active in college politics and worked for the development of Mummidivaram. He started his political journey with Indian National Congress. In 2004, YS Rajasekhara Reddy nominated him to contest from Mummidivaram constituency and he won. In 2009, he won from Amalapuram constituency and served as Rural Water Supply Minister from 2010 and continued as Minister in Rossaiah's cabinet after the death of YS Rajasekhara Reddy. In 2011, he became Animal Husbandry & Fisheries Minister in Kiran Kumar Reddy's cabinet. He resigned as a Minister and from Indian National Congress Party after the Telangana bill was passed. Later in 2011, he joined YSR Congress Party and was elected again as MLA from Amalapuram on YSRCP ticket in 2019 and became the Social Welfare Minister. In 2022, he became Transport minister.

In May 2022, his house was attacked and set on fire by a mob which opposed the new name of the district. He and his family members were evacuated by the police and were safe.
