= Chinta Anuradha =

Indian politician

Member of the India Parliament
- In office 23 May 2019 – 04 June 2024
- Preceded by: Pandula Ravindra Babu
- Succeeded by: Ganti Harish Madhur
- Constituency: Amalapuram

Personal details
- Born: 18 October 1972 (age 53) Marteru, West Godavari district, Andhra Pradesh, India
- Party: YSR Congress Party
- Spouse: Shri Talla Satyanarayana (m. 1991)
- Parent: Chinta Krishnamurthy (father)
- Occupation: Politician; Feminist; Activist
- Website: chintaanuradha.com

Chinta Anuradha is an Indian politician from Andhra Pradesh. She represented Amalapuram Lok Sabha constituency on YSR Congress ticket from 2019 to 2024. She is also parliament coordinator for the YSR Congress Party (YSRCP).

== Early life and education ==
Anuradha was born in Maruteru Village, West Godavari district, Andhra Pradesh to Chinta Krishnamurthy and Vijaya Bharathi. She married Talla Satyanarayana in 1991. They have two daughters and a son. She did her schooling in St. Ann's high school.

== Career ==
Anuradha became a member of the 17th Lok Sabha representing YSR Congress Party winning the 2019 Indian General Election in Andhra Pradesh defeating her nearest rival Ganti Harish Madhur of Telugu Desam Party by 39,966 votes. Earlier she started campaigning but officially received her party's nomination only on 16 March 2019.

In April 2019, rumours spread that she had dropped out of the race. She denied them and accused members of Jana Sena and the Telugu Desam Party for spreading misinformation against her.
