= Yedurulanka =

- village
- Interactive map of Yedurulanka
- Location in Andhra Pradesh, India
- Coordinates: 16°38′38″N 82°14′26″E
- Country: India
- State: Andhra Pradesh
- District: Konaseema

Government
  - Type: Panchayat raj
  - Body: Gram panchayat

Population (2001)
  - Total: 3,020

Languages
  - Official: Telugu
- Time zone: UTC+5:30 (IST)
- Telephone code: 08856
- Vehicle registration: AP 05
- Nearest city: Yanam, Amalapuram, Kakinada, Rajamahendravaram
- Lok Sabha constituency: Amalapuram
- Vidhan Sabha constituency: Mumidivaram

Yedurulanka is a village in I. Polavaram Mandal of Konaseema district, Andhra Pradesh, India.

Former Lok Sabha Speaker Ganti Mohana Chandra Balayogi, shortly G. M. C. Balayogi was born in this village.

== Demographics ==
According to Indian census, 2001, the demographic details of this village is as follows:

- Total Population: 3,020 in 783 Households.
- Male Population: 1,490 and Female Population: 1,530
- Children Under 6-years: 347 (Boys - 168 and Girls - 179)
- Total Literates: 1,971
