= Koppigunta =

- Village
- Interactive map of Koppigunta
- Location in Andhra Pradesh, India Koppigunta (India)
- Coordinates: 16.589105°N 82.178881°E
- Country: India
- State: Andhra Pradesh
- Region: Konaseema
- District: Konaseema district
- Mandal: Katrenikona

Languages
  - Official: Telugu
- Time zone: UTC+5:30 (IST)
- PIN: 533212

Koppigunta is a village in Katrenikona Mandal, Konaseema district, Andhra Pradesh state, India.
