= Dontikurru =

- Village
- Interactive map of Dontikurru
- Location in Andhra Pradesh, India Dontikurru (India)
- Coordinates: 16.5849748°N 82.191076°E
- Country: India
- State: Andhra Pradesh
- District: Dr. B.R. Ambedkar Konaseema
- Talukas: Amalapuram

Population (2011)
  - Total: 3,918

Languages
  - Official: Telugu
- Time zone: UTC+5:30 (IST)
- PIN: 533212

Dontikurru is a village in Katrenikona Mandal, located in Dr. B.R. Ambedkar Konaseema district of the Indian state of Andhra Pradesh.

The main occupation of the villagers is farming. Most of the places in the village are filled with paddy fields. Also, there is a certain amount of Aquaculture going on. The main source of employment in this village is to work as farm labourers.
