= Pulaparty Narayana Murty =

Indian politician (1949–2022)

Member of the Andhra Pradesh Legislative Assembly
- In office 2014–2019
- Constituency: Gannavaram, Konaseema Assembly constituency

Personal details
- Born: 1949 Gannavaram, East Godavari district, Andhra Pradesh, India
- Died: 8 July 2022 (aged 72–73) Amalapuram, Andhra Pradesh, India
- Party: Telugu Desam Party
- Spouse: Venkatalakshmi
- Children: 5
- Occupation: Politician

Pulaparty Narayana Murty (1949 – 8 July 2022) was an Indian politician from Andhra Pradesh. He served as a member of the Andhra Pradesh Legislative Assembly from the Gannavaram Assembly constituency from 2014 to 2019, representing the Telugu Desam Party. The constituency was reserved for candidates belonging to Scheduled Castes at the time.

Murty was from Gannavaram in East Godavari district, Andhra Pradesh. He was the son of Mutyalu. He married Venkatalakshmi, and they had five children: one son and four daughters. He died in Amalapuram, Andhra Pradesh, on 8 July 2022.

== Career ==
Murty won from Gannavaram, Konaseema Assembly constituency in the 2014 Andhra Pradesh Legislative Assembly election representing the Telugu Desam Party. He polled 74,967 votes and defeated his nearest rival, Kondeti Chittibabu of the YSR Congress Party, by a margin of 13,505 votes. He first became an MLA in 1996 by election from Nagaram Assembly constituency which became P. Gannavaram constituency in 2008.

He suffered a heart attack and died on 8 July 2022 at a hospital in Amalapuram. He was survived by his wife Venkatalakshmi, son Ravikumar and four daughters.
