= Kothapeta =

Kothapeta may refer to:

- Kothapet, Hyderabad, a locality in Hyderabad
- Kothapeta, Konaseema, a village in Dr. B.R. Ambedkar Konaseema district, Andhra Pradesh, India
  - Kothapeta (Assembly constituency), a constituency in the Andhra Pradesh Legislative Assembly
- Kothapeta, Telangana, a village in Warangal District
