= Amalapuram Assembly constituency =

Constituency of the Andhra Pradesh Legislative Assembly, India

Coordinates: 16.58°N 82.00°E

Amalapuram
- Constituency No. 44 for the Andhra Pradesh Legislative Assembly
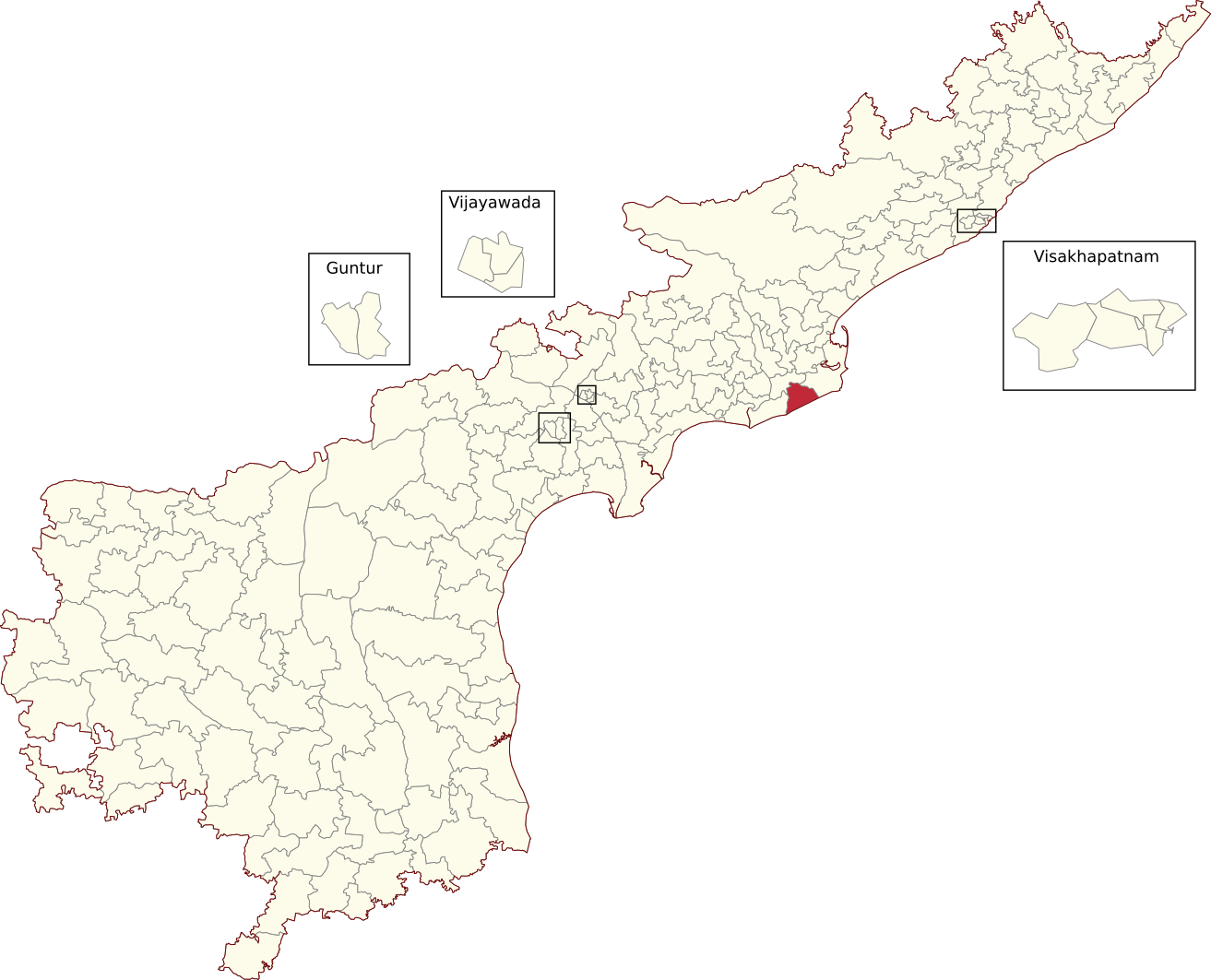
- Location of Amalapuram Assembly constituency within Andhra Pradesh

Constituency details
- Country: India
- Region: South India
- State: Andhra Pradesh
- District: Konaseema
- Lok Sabha constituency: Amalapuram
- Established: 1951
- Reservation: SC

Member of Legislative Assembly
- 16th Andhra Pradesh Legislative Assembly
- Incumbent Aithabathula Ananda Rao
- Party: TDP
- Alliance: NDA
- Elected year: 2024

Amalapuram is a Scheduled Caste reserved constituency in Konaseema district of Andhra Pradesh that elects representatives to the Andhra Pradesh Legislative Assembly in India. It is one of the seven assembly segments of Amalapuram Lok Sabha constituency.

Aithabathula Ananda Rao is the current MLA of the constituency, having won the 2024 Andhra Pradesh Legislative Assembly election from Telugu Desam Party. As of 2019, there are a total of 229,431 electors in the constituency. The constituency was established in 1951, as per the Delimitation Orders (1951).

== Mandals ==
The three mandals that form the assembly constituency are:

Mandal
Uppalaguptam
Allavaram
Amalapuram

== Members of Legislative Assembly ==
Year	Member	Political party
Madras Presidency (until 1953)
1937	Kala Venkata Rao	Indian National Congress
1946	Kala Venkata Rao	Indian National Congress
1952	Nadimpalli Ramabhadra Raju	Kisan Mazdoor Praja Party
Andhra State (1953–1956)
1955	Golakoti Narasimha Murthy (Note: The members of the first assembly of Andhra Pradesh who were elected from the 1955 election in the Andhra state were allowed a seven-year term. That is to say in 1957, elections were conducted in the newly added region of Telangana alone and then in 1962 general elections were held for the state as a whole.)	Independent politician
Andhra Pradesh (1956–2014)
1962	Kudupudi Satyanarayana	Independent politician
1965	Nadimpalli Ramabhadra Raju	Indian National Congress
1967	Kudupudi Prabhakara Rao	Independent politician
1972	Kudupudi Prabhakara Rao	Indian National Congress
1978	Palacholla Venkata Sri Rama Rao	Janata Party
1983	Metla Satyanarayana Rao	Independent politician (Note: Contested on behalf of Telugu Desam Party)
1985	Kudupudi Prabhakara Rao	Indian National Congress
1989	Kudupudi Prabhakara Rao	Indian National Congress
1994	Metla Satyanarayana Rao	Telugu Desam Party
1999	Metla Satyanarayana Rao	Telugu Desam Party
2004	Chittabbai Kudupudi	Independent politician
2009	Pinipe Viswarup	Indian National Congress
Andhra Pradesh (2014-present)
2014	Aithabathula Ananda Rao	Telugu Desam Party
2019	Pinipe Viswarup	YSR Congress Party
2024	Aithabathula Ananda Rao	Telugu Desam Party

== Election results ==
=== 1952 ===
1952 Madras Legislative Assembly election: Amalapuram
Party	Candidate	Votes	%	±%
KMPP	Nadimpalli Ramabhadra Raju	80,180	36.52	
SCF	Bojja Appalaswami	66,742	30.40	
INC	Kala Venkata Rao	27,218	12.40	
INC	Pandu Lakshmanaswami	23,847	10.86	
Socialist Party (India)	Aramate Paideswara Rao	21,592	9.83	
Margin of victory		13,438	6.12	
Turnout		2,19,579	133.71	
Registered electors		1,64,215		
KMPP win (new seat)				

=== 1955 ===
(Two seats: One reserved for general and other one for SC.)

1955 Andhra Pradesh Legislative Assembly election: Amalapuram
Party	Candidate	Votes	%	±%
Independent	Golakoti Narasimha Murthy	30,858		
CPI(M)	Guttula Narayandas	26,165		
KSP	Kudupudi Satyanarayana	25,856		
Independent	Bojja Appala Swamy	22,657		
CPI(M)	Sarella Rama Rao	19,575		
Independent	Chikile Gangisetti	17,266		
Independent gain from KMPP		Swing		

=== 1962 ===
1962 Andhra Pradesh Legislative Assembly election: Amalapuram
Party	Candidate	Votes	%	±%
Independent	Kudupudi Suryanarayana	23,581		
INC	Nadimpalli Venkatapathi	20,820		
Independent gain from INC		Swing		

=== 1965 by-election ===
1965 Andhra Pradesh Legislative Assembly by-election: Amalapuram
Party	Candidate	Votes	%	±%
INC	N.R.Raju	25,166		
Independent	K.Venkataratnam	20,235		
INC gain from Independent		Swing		

=== 1967 ===
1967 Andhra Pradesh Legislative Assembly election: Amalapuram
Party	Candidate	Votes	%	±%
Independent	K. P. Rao	25,383		
INC	N. R. Raju	22,091		
Independent gain from INC		Swing		

=== 1972 ===
1972 Andhra Pradesh Legislative Assembly election: Amalapuram
Party	Candidate	Votes	%	±%
INC	Kudupudi Prabhakara Rao	35,048		
Independent	Ravanam Ramachendra Rao	25,398		
INC gain from Independent		Swing		

1978 : Venkata sri Rama rao Palacholla

=== 1983 ===
1983 Andhra Pradesh Legislative Assembly election: Amalapuram
Party	Candidate	Votes	%	±%
Independent	Satyanarayana Rao	41,283		
INC	Prabhakarrao Kudupudi	32,354		
Independent gain from INC		Swing		

=== 1985 ===
1985 Andhra Pradesh Legislative Assembly election: Amalapuram
Party	Candidate	Votes	%	±%
INC	Kudupudi Prabhakara Rao	41,296		
TDP	Ravanam Ramachandra Rao	33,826		
INC gain from TDP		Swing		

=== 1989 ===
1989 Andhra Pradesh Legislative Assembly election: Amalapuram
Party	Candidate	Votes	%	±%
INC	Kudupudi Prabhakara Rao	45,863		
TDP	Metla Satyanarayana Rao	41,590		
INC gain from TDP		Swing		

=== 1994 ===
1994 Andhra Pradesh Legislative Assembly election: Amalapuram
Party	Candidate	Votes	%	±%
TDP	Dr. Metla Satyanarayana Rao	52,926		
INC	Kudupudi Prabhakararao	36,112		
TDP gain from INC		Swing		

=== 1999 ===
1999 Andhra Pradesh Legislative Assembly election: Amalapuram
Party	Candidate	Votes	%	±%
TDP	Metla Satyanarayana Rao	53,246		
INC	Kudupudi Prabhakara Rao	34,466		
TDP hold		Swing		

=== 2004 ===
2004 Andhra Pradesh Legislative Assembly election: Amalapuram
Party	Candidate	Votes	%	±%
Independent	Chittabbai Kudupudi	31,858	33.35	+11.00
TDP	Metla Satyanarayana Rao	27,818	29.12	−28.98
INC	Tadi Tatarao	24,777	25.93	−11.68
Majority		4,040	4.23	
Turnout		95,535	77.54	+3.62
Independent gain from TDP		Swing		

=== 2009 ===
2009 Andhra Pradesh Legislative Assembly election: Amalapuram
Party	Candidate	Votes	%	±%
INC	Pinipe Viswarup	57,922	41.96	+16.03
PRP	Chinta Krishnamurthy	51,649	37.41	
TDP	Aithabathula Anandarao	23,185	16.79	−12.33
Majority		6,273	4.55	
Turnout		138,056	79.71	+2.17
INC gain from Independent		Swing		

=== 2014 ===
2014 Andhra Pradesh Legislative Assembly election: Amalapuram
Party	Candidate	Votes	%	±%
TDP	Aithabathula Ananda Rao	76,444	50.99	
YSRCP	Babu Rao Golla	64,031	42.71	
Majority		12,413	8.28	
Turnout		149,928	78.32	−1.39
TDP gain from INC		Swing		

=== 2019 ===
2019 Andhra Pradesh Legislative Assembly election: Amalapuram
Party	Candidate	Votes	%	±%
YSRCP	Pinipe Viswarup	72,003	42.51%	
TDP	Aithabathula Ananda Rao	46,349	27.36%	
JSP	Shetty Battula Rajababu	45,200	26.69%	
Majority		25,654	15.15%	
Turnout		169,382		
YSRCP gain from TDP		Swing		

=== 2024 ===
2024 Andhra Pradesh Legislative Assembly election: Amalapuram
Party	Candidate	Votes	%	±%
TDP	Aithabathula Ananda Rao	104,022	58.56	
YSRCP	Pinipe Viswarup	65,394	36.81	
INC	Aithabathula Subhashini	1357	0.76	
Independent	Dantuluri Rohit Varma (Yesuchristu , seeluvarakshakudu)	11	0.1	
Majority		38628	21.74	
Turnout		177636		
TDP gain from YSRCP		Swing		

== See also ==
- List of constituencies of the Andhra Pradesh Legislative Assembly
