= Cheyyeru =

- Village
- Interactive map of Cheyyeru
- Location in Andhra Pradesh, India Cheyyeru (India)
- Coordinates: 16.602771°N 82.100624°E
- Country: India
- State: Andhra Pradesh
- District: Dr. B.R. Ambedkar Konaseema
- Talukas: Katrenikona

Languages
  - Official: Telugu
- Time zone: UTC+5:30 (IST)
- PIN: 533222

Cheyyeru is a village in Katrenikona Mandal, located in Dr. B.R. Ambedkar Konaseema district of the Indian state of Andhra Pradesh.
