= Pamula Rajeswari Devi =

Indian politician

Pamula Rajeswari Devi (born 1963) is an Indian politician from Andhra Pradesh. She is a former member of the Andhra Pradesh Legislative Assembly from Gannavaram, Konaseema Assembly constituency, which is reserved for Scheduled Caste community, in the then West Godavari district. She was last elected in the 2009 Andhra Pradesh Legislative Assembly election representing the Indian National Congress.

== Early life and education ==
Devi is from Razole, Konaseema district, Andhra Pradesh. She married Vijaya Rangarao. She studied Class 10 at S.S.C Zilla Parishad High School, Pedapatnam Lanka and passed the examinations in 1978.

== Career ==
Devi was elected as an MLA in the Gannavaram, Konaseema Assembly constituency representing the Indian National Congress in the 2009 Andhra Pradesh Legislative Assembly election. She polled 44.756 votes and defeated her nearest rival, Pulaparthy Narayana Murthy of the Telugu Desam Party, by a margin of 3,105 votes. The erstwhile Nagaram seat has become P. Gannavaram in 2008 and is reserved for Scheduled Caste community. She was first elected as an MLA from Nagaram Assembly constituency in 2004 Andhra Pradesh Legislative Assembly election. In 2004, she polled 36,325 votes and defeated her nearest rival, Ayyaji Vema Manepalli of the Bharatiya Janata Party, by a margin of 9,281 votes. In the 2019 Andhra Pradesh Legislative Assembly election, she contested the same seat on the Janasena Party ticket but could only finish third behind winner, Kondeti Chittibabu of the YSR Congress Party and Nelapudi Stalin Babu of the Telugu Desam, who finished second. Devi polled 36,259 votes.

She resigned from Congress and joined YSRCP in April 2017, before switching to Janasena Party, and when she was denied a ticket for the assembly elections, she joined YSR Congress Party in April 2024.
