= Billakurru =

- Village
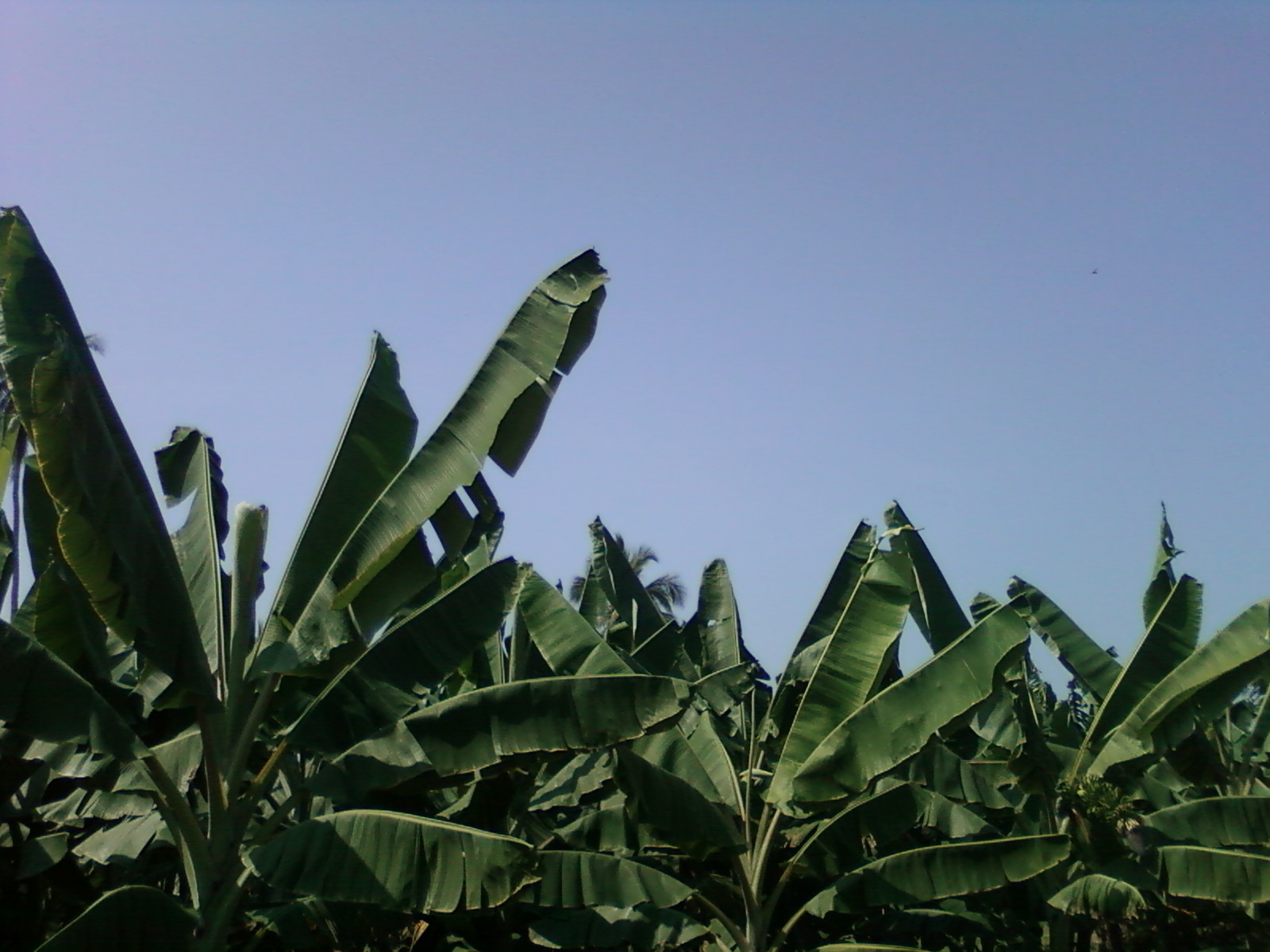
- Banana Plantations near Billakurru
- Interactive map of Billakurru
- Location in Andhra Pradesh, India
- Coordinates: 16.9167°N 81.8333°E
- Country: India
- State: Andhra Pradesh
- District: Konaseema
- Mandal: Kothapeta
- Talukas: Kothapeta

Government
  - Body: Billakurru Village Panchayat
- Elevation: 8 m (26 ft)

Languages
  - Official: Telugu
- Time zone: UTC+5:30 (IST)
- PIN: 533228
- Telephone code: 8855
- Vehicle registration: AP 5
- Nearest city: Amalapuram
- Lok Sabha constituency: Amalapuram
- Vidhan Sabha constituency: Amalapuram
- Civic agency: Billakurru Village Panchayat
- Website: www.eastgodavari.nic.in
- [one of the oldest village in India]

Billakurru is a village in Kothapeta mandal, Konaseema district of Andhra Pradesh, India.

== Geography ==
Billakurru is located at 16.9167°N 81.8333°E. It has an average elevation of 8 meters (29 feet).
