= Ponnada Venkata Satish Kumar =

Indian politician (born 1974)

- Born: 1974 (age 51–52); Mummidivaram Nagar
- Occupation: Politician
- Political party: Indian National Congress

Ponnada Venkata Satish Kumar (born 1974) is an Indian politician from Andhra Pradesh. He was a former member of the Andhra Pradesh Legislative Assembly representing the YSR Congress Party from Mummidivaram Assembly constituency in the erstwhile East Godavari District. He was elected in the 2019 Andhra Pradesh Legislative Assembly election from Mummidivaram in the present Konaseema District.

== Early life and education ==
Kumar was born in Mummidivaram Nagar, Konaseema district, Andhra Pradesh. He is the son of Satya Rao. He studied intermediate (plus two) from SKBR college, Amalapuram. He runs his own business.

== Career ==
Kumar started his political journey with the Indian National Congress. He was elected in the 2009 Andhra Pradesh Legislative Assembly election representing the Indian National Congress from Mummidivaram Assembly constituency in Konaseema district. Later, he joined YSR Congress Party and won the 2019 Andhra Pradesh Legislative Assembly election from the same seat. However, he lost the 2024 Andhra Pradesh Legislative Assembly election to Datla Subbaraju of the Telugu Desam Party by a margin of 38,736 votes.

He was nominated to the Tirumala Tirupati Devasthanams Trust Board in September 2023.

=== Riots ===
In May 2022, protesters burned his house and Minister Pinipe Viswarup's house in protest against renaming of the Konaseema district. Later, Andhra Pradesh government withdrew all cases related to the riots.
