= Amalapuram railway station =

Railway station in Andhra Pradesh, India

Amalapuram

General information
- Location: Amalapuram, Andhra Pradesh, India
- Coordinates: 16.5852°N 82.0167°E
- System: Indian Railways station
- Owner: Indian Railways
- Operator: South Central Railway Zone
- Line: Under construction

Other information
- Status: Under Construction
- Station code: AMLPR
- Zone(s): South Central
- Division(s): Vijayawada
- Website: http://www.indianrailways.gov.in

History
- Electrified: Ongoing
Location
- Location within Andhra Pradesh

Amalapuram railway station is a railway station currently under construction located in Amalapuram, Dr. B.R. Ambedkar Konaseema district, Andhra Pradesh, India. It will serve as a vital link connecting the cities and villages between Narasapuram and Kakinada once completed and it is owned by Indian Railways.

== History ==
The project was sanctioned in the year 2000–2001 for a distance of 57 kilometers. The proposed alignment traverses through the towns and villages of the Konaseema region. The new railway line will connect Magam, Amalapuram, Peruru, Pasarlapudi, Jaggannapeta, and Razole towns.

The detailed project report was sanctioned at an estimated cost of Rs. 2,120 crores. From 2014–19 until now, an expenditure of Rs. 323 crores has been incurred on this project. The financial year-wise expenditure incurred on this project is as follows: Rs. 1.33 crore in 2014 –15, Rs. 3.39 crore in 2015 –16, Rs. 184.64 crore in 2016 –17, Rs. 60.51 crore in 2017–18, and Rs. 73.39 crore until December 2018–19.

== Further plans ==
The completion of the Kakinada-Kotipalli Railway line, undertaken at a cost of Rs 111 crore, was facilitated by the former Lok Sabha Speaker G.M.C. Balayogi. It provides an alternative route to alleviate congestion on the Grand Trunk route, catering to increased goods and passenger traffic. The existing main railway line faces challenges in meeting the demands of cargo transportation due to heavy passenger traffic. By linking the main railway line with Kakinada through Pithapuram, the Kakinada-Narasapuram railway line will play a vital role in carrying cargo from ports and other trades, effectively reducing pressure on the main line.

The Kakinada-Kotipalli railway line, which extends from Narasapuram in West Godavari district through Amalapuram in the Konaseema area, serves as a significant alternative cargo corridor for South Central Railway and East Coast Railway. This railway line connects four ports: Visakhapatnam, Gangavaram, Kakinada, and Machilipatnam, with plans for further extension to Chennai via Krishnapatnam.
