= G. V. Harsha Kumar =

Indian politician (born 1960)

Geddam Vijaya Harsha Kumar

Member of Parliament, Lok Sabha
- In office 2004 - 2014
- Preceded by: Vijaya Kumari Ganti
- Succeeded by: Pandula Ravindra Babu
- Constituency: Amalapuram

Personal details
- Born: 23 October 1960 (age 65) Rajahmundry, Andhra Pradesh
- Party: Indian National Congress
- Spouse: Kolli Sarala Kumari (m.1987)
- Children: G.V. Sri Raj, G.V.Sunder
- Education: M.Sc. Marine Geology, Andhra University
- As of 8 Dec, 2015

Geddam Vijaya Harsha Kumar (born 23 October 1960) is a member of the 14th and 15th Lok Sabha of India. He represented the Amalapuram constituency of Andhra Pradesh from 2004 to 2014, and is a member of the Indian National Congress. He rejoined Indian National Congress (INC) on 23 November 2020 at Rajahmundry.

== Early life and career ==
Kumar started working for the congress organisation since his student days. He served as vice president in Government Junior College, Rajahmundry from 1976 to 1978, then moved on to become the Joint Secretary in Govt. College Rajahmundry from 1979 to 1980. He was elected as the President of National Students' Union of India (N.S.U.I.) Rajahmundry. Later he served to be the State Organisation Secretary for Andhra Pradesh N.S.U.I. and served as the General Secretary for the state N.S.U.I.

In 1984 he contested the president post for Andhra University, became the chairman for Joint Admission Council for all the university students and fought for students' community rights.

In 1985 he contested as an M.L.A. candidate from the Payakaraopeta constituency for the Indian National Congress Party and lost.

In 1987 he was elected as the Vice President of N.S.U.I in Andhra Pradesh State, and from 1991 onwards he served as the State General Secretary for the Youth Congress in Andhra Pradesh. In 1996 he became the Vice President for A.P.Y.C. and in 1999 he served as the Andhra Pradesh Congress Committee Secretary.

In 2004 he contested as the mayoral candidate for the Rajahmundry Municipal Elections and lost by a narrow margin of 653 votes. He served as the Member of Parliament (India) for the Indian National Congress from 2004 to 2014. Again he joined Indian Congress Party (INC) on 23 November 2020 at Rajahmundry.
