= Datla Subbaraju =

Indian politicians from Andhra Pradesh

Member of the Andhra Pradesh Legislative Assembly
- Incumbent
- Assumed office 2024
- Preceded by: Ponnada Venkata Satish Kumar
- Constituency: Mummidivaram

Personal details
- Party: Telugu Desam Party

Datla Subbaraju is an Indian politician from Andhra Pradesh. He is a member of the Telugu Desam Party. He has been elected as the Member of the Legislative Assembly from Mummidivaram Assembly constituency in 2014, 2024 Andhra Pradesh Legislative Assembly elections and appointed whip in Assembly on 12 November 2024.
