= Guttenadeevi =

- Village
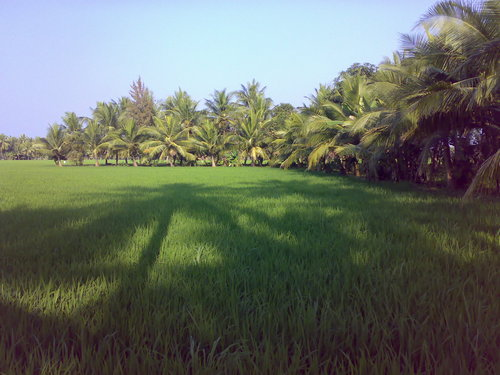
- Interactive map of Guttenadeevi
- Country: India
- State: Andhra Pradesh
- District: Dr. B.R. Ambedkar Konaseema

Area
  - Total: 36.44 km^{2} (14.07 sq mi)

Population (2011)
  - Total: 9,225
  - Density: 253.2/km^{2} (655.7/sq mi)

Languages
  - Official: Telugu
- Time zone: UTC+5:30 (IST)
- Nearest city: kakinada
- Lok Sabha constituency: Amalapuram
- Vidhan Sabha constituency: Mummidivaram

Guttenadeevi is a village in Dr. B.R. Ambedkar Konaseema district of the Indian state of Andhra Pradesh. It is located in I. Polavaram Mandal of Amalapuram revenue division.
