= Pallamkurru =

- Village
- Interactive map of Pallamkurru
- Location in Andhra Pradesh, India Pallamkurru (India)
- Coordinates: 16.600538°N 82.198869°E
- Country: India
- State: Andhra Pradesh
- District: Konaseema
- Mandal: Katrenikona

Languages
  - Official: Telugu
- Time zone: UTC+5:30 (IST)
- PIN: 533212

Pallamkurru is a village in Katrenikona Mandal, Konaseema district, Andhra Pradesh state, India.
