= Pandula Ravindra Babu =

Indian politician

Member of Legislative Council Andhra Pradesh
- In office 28 July 2020 – 27 July 2026
- Constituency: Nominated by Governor

Member of Parliament, Lok Sabha
- In office 16 May 2014 – 22 May 2019
- Preceded by: G. V. Harsha Kumar
- Succeeded by: Chinta Anuradha
- Constituency: Amalapuram

Personal details
- Born: 8 November 1955 (age 70) Kovvali, West Godavari district, Andhra Pradesh
- Party: YSR Congress Party
- Spouse: Smt. Suneetha Ravindra Babu
- Children: 2 daughters

Pandula Ravindra Babu (born 8 November 1955) is an Indian politician and a former Member of Parliament from Amalapuram Lok Sabha constituency, Andhra Pradesh. He won the 2014 Indian general election being a Telugu Desam Party candidate. He was elected as Officer of Indian Revenue Service till early 2014, when he resigned to contest Lok Sabha elections. He is a prolific speaker and takes a special interest in debating social issues.

== Personal life ==
Dr Ravindra Babu married Smt. Suneetha Ravindra Babu on 12 Jun 1985. He has two daughters. He worked as IRS officer before entering into politics. His elder daughter was a pilot and married to IAS officer of Orissa cadre .

== Political career ==
Dr Ravindra Babu elected to 16th Lok Sabha. At the Lok Sabha he was a member of the Committee on the Welfare of Scheduled Castes and Scheduled Tribes, Standing Committee on Petroleum and Natural Gas, Consultative Committee, Ministry of Petroleum and Natural Gas. He joined YSR Congress Party on 18 February 2019. YSR congress Party selected him for MLC under Governor quota in July 2020.

== Controversies ==
MP Ravindrababu allegedly said that "people are joining the armed forces for free liquor, free meat and for free holidaying with family members." His remarks kicked up a row nation-wide. In fact, AP CM N. Chandrababu Naidu sought an explanation from the MP. "I had earlier extended medical services to the Army personnel. I was misquoted. Mr Naidu was misinformed about my remarks," he said. Later MP has offered to tender an apology to the Indian Armed Forces personnel, if they felt slighted by his controversial remarks.
