= Kothapeta, Konaseema district =

Kothapeta
- Village
- Interactive map of Kothapeta
- Location in Andhra Pradesh, India
- Coordinates: 16.7162°N 81.8967°E
- Country: India
- State: Andhra Pradesh
- District: Dr. B. R. Ambedkar Konaseema
- Talukas: Kothapeta

Government
  - MLA: Bandaru Satyananda Rao

Area
  - Total: 13.99 km^{2} (5.40 sq mi)

Population (2011)
  - Total: 24,539
  - Density: 1,754/km^{2} (4,543/sq mi)

Languages
  - Official: Telugu
- Time zone: UTC+5:30 (IST)
- PIN: 533 223
- Vehicle Registration: AP05 (Former); AP39 (from 30 January 2019)

Kothapeta is a village in Kothapeta mandal of Dr. B. R. Ambedkar Konaseema district of the Indian state of Andhra Pradesh.

== Transport ==
Kothapeta is located on SH 40 (Rajamahendravaram-Amalapuram road). The nearest major railway stations to Kothapeta are Rajahmundry railway station and Tanuku railway station. The nearest airport to Kothapeta is Rajahmundry Airport which is 50 km away.
