= Katrenikona mandal =

Katrnikona Mandal
- Mandal
- Interactive map of Katrnikona Mandal
- Country: India
- State: Andhra Pradesh
- District: Dr. B.R. Ambedkar Konaseema district
- Population according to 2011 Census: 74,819
- Number of Villages: 14
- Area in Sq Km: 138.16
- Time zone: UTC+5:30 (IST)

Katrnikona Mandal is one of the 22 mandals in Dr. B.R. Ambedkar Konaseema district of Andhra Pradesh. As per census 2011, there are 14 villages in this Mandal.

== Demographics ==
Katrnikona Mandal has total population of 74,819 as per the Census 2011 out of which 37,764 are males while 37,055 are females. The average Sex Ratio of Katrnikona Mandal is 981. The total literacy rate of Katrnikona Mandal is 68%.

== Towns and villages ==
=== Villages ===
1. Bantumilli
2. Brahmasamedyam
3. Cheyyeru
4. Chirrayanam
5. Dontikurru
6. Geddanapalle
7. Kandikuppa
8. Katrenikona
9. Kundaleswaram
10. Lakshmiwada
11. Nadavapalle
12. Pallamkurru
13. Penuwalla
14. Uppudi
15. Pallam

== See also ==
- List of mandals in Andhra Pradesh
