= K. S. R. Murthy =

Indian politician

MP
- Preceded by: G.M.C.Balayogi (1991-1996)
- Constituency: Amalapuram(11th Lok Sabha 1996-1998)

Personal details
- Party: INC

K. S. R. Murthy was a member of the 11th Lok Sabha of India. He represented the Amalapuram constituency of Andhra Pradesh and was a member of the Indian National Congress. He was in Prajarajyam party for some time and later resigned from the Party to join congress again. Prior to entering politics he served in Indian Administrative Service and rose to the level of secretary to Government of India.

Lives in Hyderabad, Andhra Pradesh. He has three children (Srikanth, Sumedha and Sanjay) with his late Wife Smt Anasuya Devi Murthy. His son K Sanjay Murthy is a retired IAS officer and currently serving as the 15th Comptroller and Auditor General of India since November 2024.
