= Gannavaram, Konaseema Assembly constituency =

Constituency of the Andhra Pradesh Legislative Assembly, India

Coordinates: 16.61°N 81.89°E

Gannavaram
- Constituency No. 46 for the Andhra Pradesh Legislative Assembly
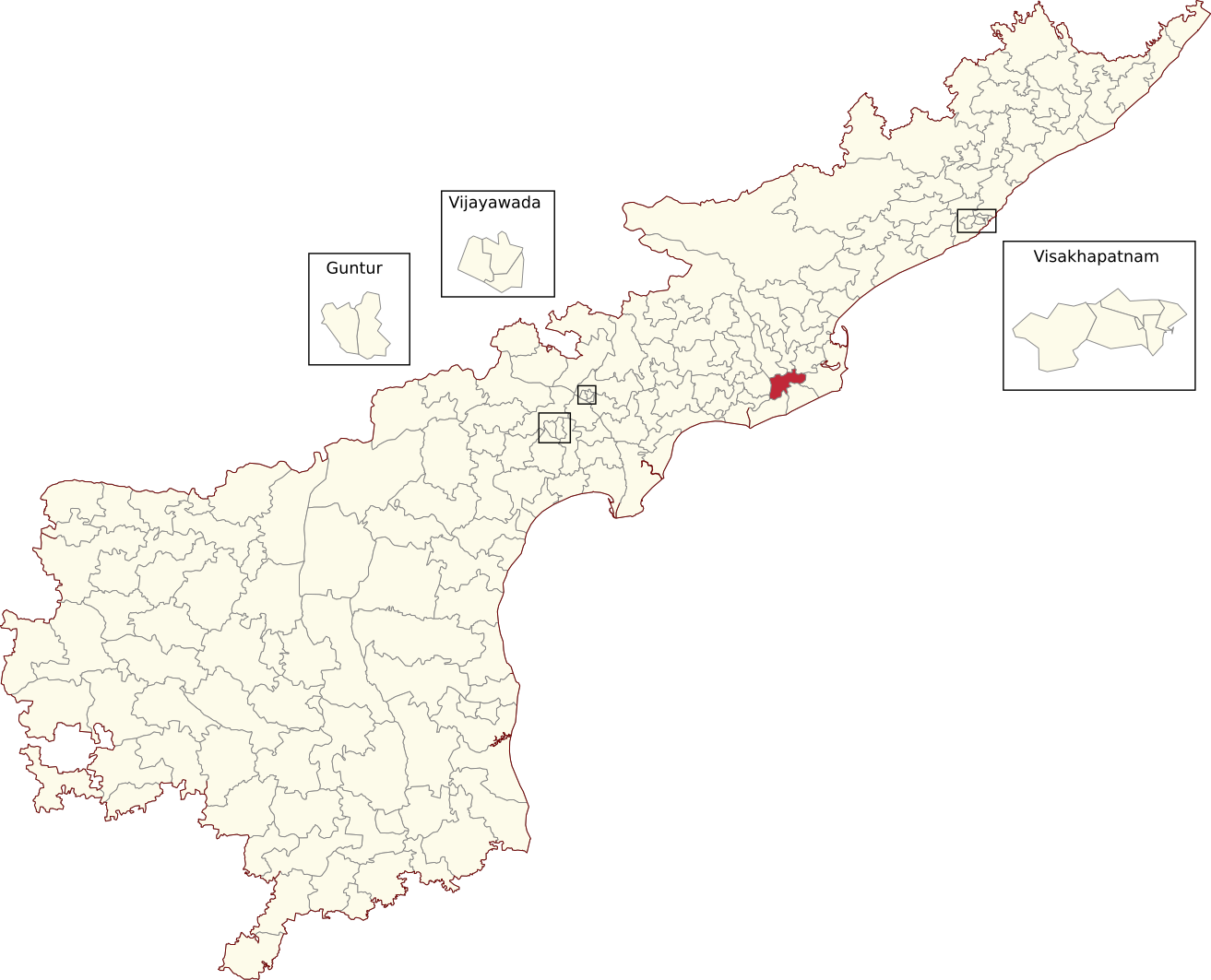
- Location of Gannavaram Assembly constituency within Andhra Pradesh

Constituency details
- Country: India
- Region: South India
- State: Andhra Pradesh
- District: Konaseema
- Lok Sabha constituency: Amalapuram
- Established: 2008
- Total electors: 189,258
- Reservation: SC

Member of Legislative Assembly
- 16th Andhra Pradesh Legislative Assembly
- Incumbent Giddi Satyanarayana
- Party: JSP
- Alliance: NDA
- Elected year: 2024

Gannavaram Assembly Constituency is a Scheduled Caste reserved constituency in Konaseema district of Andhra Pradesh that elects representatives to the Andhra Pradesh Legislative Assembly in India. It is one of the seven assembly segments of Amalapuram Lok Sabha constituency.

Giddi Satyanarayana is the current MLA of the constituency, having won the 2024 Andhra Pradesh Legislative Assembly election from Jana Sena Party. As of 2019, there are a total of 189,258 electors in the constituency. The constituency was established in 2008, as per the Delimitation Orders (2008).

== Mandals ==
The four mandals that form the assembly constituency are:

Mandal
P.Gannavaram
Ambajipeta
Ainavilli
Mamidikuduru (Part)

The villages within the Mamidikuduru Mandal falling in this constituency are Pedapatnam, Appanapalle, Botlakurru Doddavaram, Pasarlapudi, Nagaram, Mogalikuduru, Makanapalem, Lutukurru, Pasarlapudilanka and Adurru. The other part of this mandal comes under Razole assembly constituency.

== Members of the Legislative Assembly ==
Year	Name	Party
2009	Pamula Rajeswari Devi	Indian National Congress
2014	Pulaparty Narayana Murty	Telugu Desam Party
2019	Kondeti Chittibabu	YSR Congress Party
2024	Giddi Satyanarayana	Janasena Party

== Election results ==
Vote share of Winning candidates
2024	57.14%
2019	43.13%
2014	52.49%
2009	33.26%

=== 2024 ===
2024 Andhra Pradesh Legislative Assembly election: Gannavaram
Party	Candidate	Votes	%	±%
JSP	Giddi Satyanarayana	96,108	57.14	▲33.93
YSRCP	Vipparthi Venugopalarao	62,741	37.30	▼5.83
BSP	Kollabathula Satyanarayana	1,819	1.08	
NOTA	None of the Above	1,751	1.04	▼0.54
INC	Kondeti Chittibabu	1,583	0.94	▲0.29
IND	4 Independent Candidates	1,165	0.69	
OTH	6 Other Party Candidates	3,035	1.80	
Majority		33,367	19.84	▲5.62
Turnout		168,202	84.63	▲2.15
Swing to JSP from YSRCP		Swing		

=== 2019 ===
2019 Andhra Pradesh Legislative Assembly election: Gannavaram
Party	Candidate	Votes	%	±%
YSRCP	Kondeti Chittibabu	67,373	43.13	▲0.09
TDP	Nelapudi Stalin Babu	45,166	28.91	▼23.58
JSP	Pamula Rajeswari Devi	36,259	23.21	
NOTA	None of the Above	2,470	1.58	▲1.03
BJP	Kolli Surya Rao	1,385	0.89	
IND	Chinnam Ramesh Babu	1,059	0.68	
INC	Mulaparthi Mohana Rao	1,010	0.65	▼0.04
IND	Makey Davy Prasad	483	0.31	
IND	Ravi Kumar Beera	438	0.28	
OTH	2 Other Party Candidates	569	0.36	
Majority		22,207	14.22	▲4.77
Turnout		156,212	82.48	▲4.48
Swing to YSRCP from TDP		Swing		

=== 2014 ===
2014 Andhra Pradesh Legislative Assembly election: Gannavaram
Party	Candidate	Votes	%	±%
TDP	Pulaparty Narayana Murty	74,967	52.49	▲21.53
YSRCP	Kondeti Chittibabu	61,462	43.04	
BSP	Kusume Satyanarayana	1,351	0.95	▲0.16
INC	Pamula Rajeswari Devi	991	0.69	▼32.57
NOTA	None of the Above	791	0.55	
JSP	G. V. Sri Raj	759	0.53	
IND	4 Independent Candidates	1,085	0.76	
OTH	3 Other Party Candidates	1,409	0.99	
Majority		13,505	9.45	▲7.15
Turnout		142,815	78.00	
Swing to TDP from INC		Swing		

=== 2009 ===
2009 Andhra Pradesh Legislative Assembly election: Gannavaram (SC)
Party	Candidate	Votes	%	±%
INC	Pamula Rajeswari Devi	44,756	33.26	
TDP	Kondeti Prabhakara Reddy	41,651	30.96	
PRP	Janga Goutham	41,359	30.74	
BJP	Kolli Suryarao	3,140	2.33	
IND	Yellamelli Arjunudu	1,628	1.21	
BSP	Kusume Satyanarayana	1,059	0.79	
IND	Makey Davy Prasad	482	0.36	
IND	Kondeti Prabhakara Reddy	476	0.35	
Majority		3,105	2.30	
Turnout		134,551		
INC win (new seat)				

== See also ==
- List of constituencies of the Andhra Pradesh Legislative Assembly
