= Razole Assembly constituency =

Constituency of the Andhra Pradesh Legislative Assembly, India

Coordinates: 16.47°N 81.84°E

Razole
- Constituency No. 45 for the Andhra Pradesh Legislative Assembly
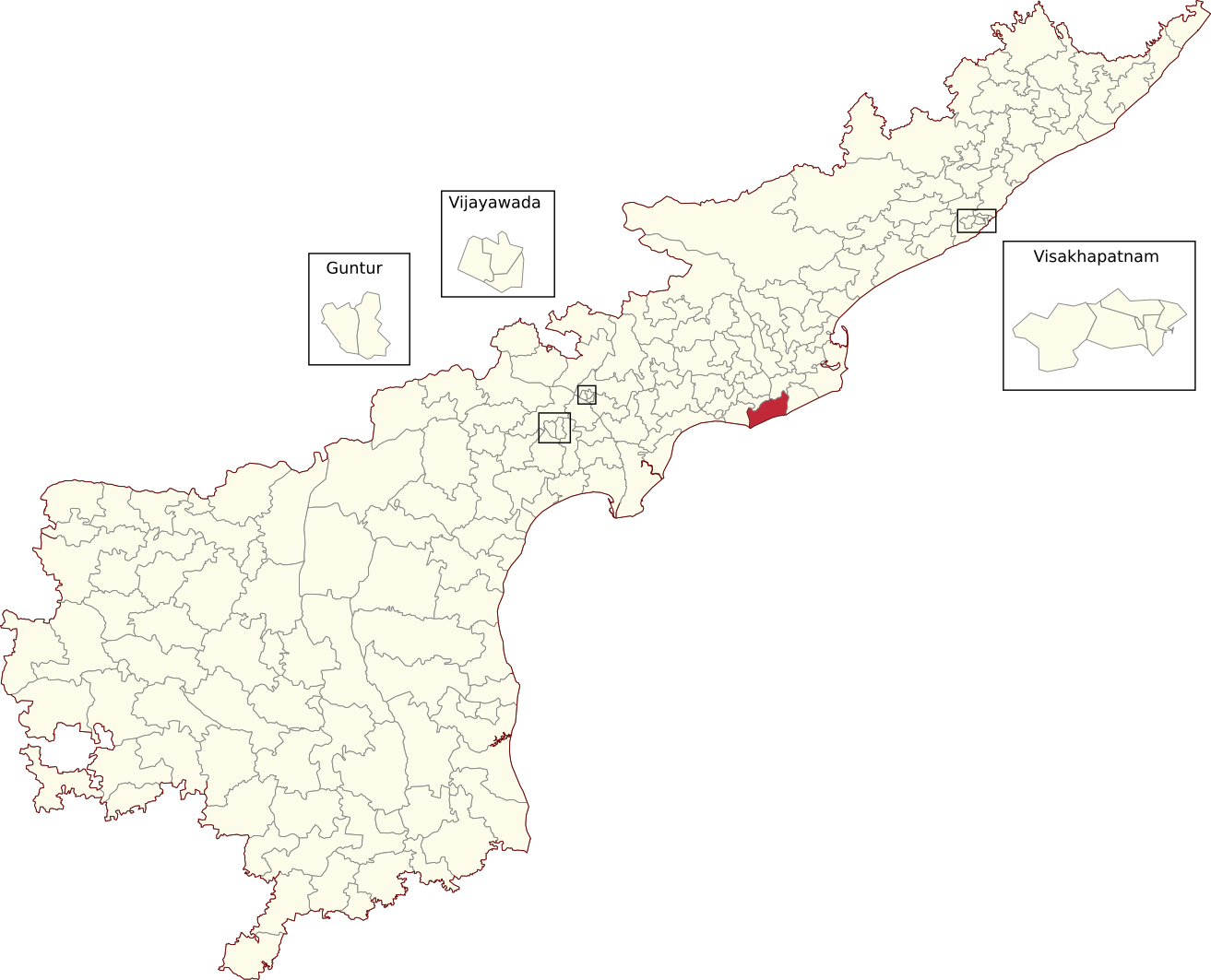
- Location of Razole Assembly constituency within Andhra Pradesh

Constituency details
- Country: India
- Region: South India
- State: Andhra Pradesh
- District: Konaseema
- Lok Sabha constituency: Amalapuram
- Established: 1951
- Total electors: 186,819
- Reservation: SC

Member of Legislative Assembly
- 16th Andhra Pradesh Legislative Assembly
- Incumbent Deva Varaprasad
- Party: JSP
- Alliance: NDA
- Elected year: 2024

Razole is a Scheduled Caste reserved constituency in Konaseema district of Andhra Pradesh that elects representatives to the Andhra Pradesh Legislative Assembly in India. It is one of the seven assembly segments of Amalapuram Lok Sabha constituency.

Deva Varaprasad is the current MLA of the constituency, having won the 2024 Andhra Pradesh Legislative Assembly election from Janasena Party. As of 2019, there are a total of 186,819 electors in the constituency. The constituency was established in 1951, as per the Delimitation Orders (1951).

== Mandals ==
The four mandals that form the assembly constituency are:

Mandal
Razole
Malikipuram
Sakhinetipalle
Mamidikuduru (Part)

The villages of Mamidikuduru Mandal that are covered by the constituency are Mamidikuduru, Geddada, Edarada, Komarada, Magatapalle and Gogannamatham. The other part of this mandal is a part of Gannavaram Assembly constituency.

== Members of the Legislative Assembly ==
Year	Member	Political party
1952	Alluri Venkataramaraju	Communist Party of India
1955	Alluri Venkataramaraju	Communist Party of India
1962	Gaddem Mahalakshmi	Indian National Congress
1967	G. R. Nayinala	Indian National Congress
1972	Bikkina Gopalakrishnarao	Independent
1978	Rudraraju Ramalingaraju	Indian National Congress
1983	Alluri Venkata Suryanarayana Raju	Telugu Desam Party
1985	Alluri Venkata Suryanarayana Raju	Telugu Desam Party
1989	Mangena Gangaiah	Indian National Congress
1994	Alluri Venkata Suryanarayana Raju	Telugu Desam Party
1999	Alluri Venkata Suryanarayana Raju	Telugu Desam Party
2004	Alluri Krishnam Raju	Indian National Congress
2009	Rapaka Vara Prasada Rao	Indian National Congress
2014	Gollapalli Surya Rao	Telugu Desam Party
2019	Rapaka Vara Prasada Rao	Janasena Party
2024	Deva Varaprasad	Janasena Party

== Election results ==
=== 2024 ===
2024 Andhra Pradesh Legislative Assembly election: Razole
Party	Candidate	Votes	%	±%
JSP	Deva Varaprasad	95,514	60.13	
YSRCP	Gollapalli Surya Rao	56,503	35.57	
NOTA	None of the Above	1,628	1.02	
INC	Sarella Prasanna Kumar	1,435	0.90	
BSP	Pulapakura Lilini Asha Rani	1,095	0.69	
IND	4 Independent Candidates	1,594	1.00	
OTH	2 Other Party Candidates	1,071	0.67	
Majority		39,011	24.56	
Turnout		158,840	80.22	
JSP hold		Swing		

=== 2019 ===
2019 Andhra Pradesh Legislative Assembly election: Razole
Party	Candidate	Votes	%	±%
JSP	Rapaka Vara Prasada Rao	50,053	33.46	
YSRCP	Rajeswara Rao Bonthu	49,239	32.91	
TDP	Gollapalli Surya Rao	45,592	30.47	
NOTA	None of the Above	1,413	0.94	
BJP	Bathula Lakshmi Kumari	1,000	0.67	
INC	Kasi Lakshman Swammy	818	0.55	
IND	Pothumudi Alivelu Manga Tayaru	342	0.23	
OTH	4 Other Party Candidates	1,148	0.77	
Majority		814	0.55	
Turnout		149,605	80.04	
Swing to JSP from TDP		Swing		

=== 2014 ===
2014 Andhra Pradesh Legislative Assembly election: Razole
Party	Candidate	Votes	%	±%
TDP	Gollapalli Surya Rao	66,960	49.52	
YSRCP	Bonthu Rajeswara Rao	62,277	46.05	
BSP	Chittinayana Medidi	1,894	1.40	
INC	Vijaya Prasad Sarella	1,119	0.83	
JSP	Mathi Jaya Prakash	881	0.65	
NOTA	None of the Above	856	0.63	
IND	3 Independent Candidates	737	0.54	
OTH	2 Other Party Candidates	506	0.37	
Majority		4,683	3.47	
Turnout		135,230	77.68	
Swing to TDP from INC		Swing		

=== 2009 ===
2009 Andhra Pradesh Legislative Assembly election: Razole
Party	Candidate	Votes	%	±%
INC	Rapaka Vara Prasada Rao	52,319	39.76	−22.43
PRP	Nalli Venkata Krishna Mallik	46,450	35.30	
TDP	Bathula Ramu	25,286	19.21	−17.39
Majority		5,869	4.46	
Turnout		131,598	79.50	−4.45
INC hold		Swing		

=== 2004 ===
2004 Andhra Pradesh Legislative Assembly election: Razole
Party	Candidate	Votes	%	±%
INC	Alluri Krishnam Raju	68,104	62.19	+13.10
TDP	Alluri Venkata Suryanarayana Raju	40,086	36.60	−13.07
Majority		28,018	25.59	
Turnout		109,517	83.95	+6.76
INC gain from TDP		Swing		

=== 1999 ===
1999 Andhra Pradesh Legislative Assembly election: Razole
Party	Candidate	Votes	%	±%
TDP	Alluri Venkata Suryanarayana Raju	49,204	49.7	▼0.1
INC	Alluri Krishnamraju	48,626	49.1	▲6.8
Anna Telugu Desam Party	Pemmadi Rao	584	0.6	
Independent	Pratthi Rao	473	0.5	
Ajeya Bharat Party	Satyanarayana Chiranjeevi	176	0.2	
Majority		578	0.6	▼6.8
Turnout		100,972	78.7	▼0.8
TDP hold		Swing		

=== 1994 ===
1994 Andhra Pradesh Legislative Assembly election: Razole
Party	Candidate	Votes	%	±%
TDP	Alluri Venkata Suryanarayana Raju	48,505	49.8	▲0.4
INC	Gangayya Mangena	41,231	42.3	▼7.7
BSP	Kudupudi Rao	7,063	7.3	
BJP	Petchetti Rao	400	0.4	
Independent	Chinta Subhash	164	0.2	
Independent	R. Bhai	111	0.1	
Majority		7,274	7.4	▲6.8
Turnout		98,594	79.5	▼1.1
TDP gain from INC		Swing		

=== 1989 ===
1989 Andhra Pradesh Legislative Assembly election: Razole
Party	Candidate	Votes	%	±%
INC	Gangaiah Mangena	46,413	50	▲17.5
TDP	Alluri Venkata Suryanarayana Raju	45,802	49.4	▼14.1
Independent	Alluru Surya Narayana Raju	570	0.6	
Majority		611	0.6	▼30.1
Turnout		94,868	80.6	▲3.8
INC hold		Swing		

=== 1985 ===
1985 Andhra Pradesh Legislative Assembly election: Razole
Party	Candidate	Votes	%	±%
TDP	Alluri Venkata Suryanarayana Raju	47,230	63.5	▲11.8
INC	Ponnada Rao	24,167	32.5	▲0.7
Independent	Kollu Venkanna	2,055	2.8	
Independent	Katt Prasad	614	0.8	
Independent	Gollamandala Babu	277	0.4	
Majority		23,063	30.7	▲11
Turnout		75,009	76.8	▼0.9
TDP hold		Swing		

=== 1983 ===
1983 Andhra Pradesh Legislative Assembly election: Razole
Party	Candidate	Votes	%	±%
TDP	Alluri Venkata Suryanarayana Raju	36,674	51.7	
INC	Rudraraju Bhimaraju	22,567	31.8	▲7.8
Independent	Yenumala Raju	7,308	10.3	
CPI	Alluri Raju	4,350	6.1	
Majority		14,107	19.7	▼7.6
Turnout		71,757	77.7	▼3.6
TDP gain from INC		Swing		

=== 1978 ===
1978 Andhra Pradesh Legislative Assembly election: Razole
Party	Candidate	Votes	%	±%
INC	Rudraraju Ramalingaraju	37,992	51.7	▲8.4
INC(I)	Sayyaparaju Gandhiraju	17,652	24	
JP	Balla Sreeramulu	17,135	23.3	
Independent	Kanety Rao	700	1.0	
Majority		20,340	27.3	▲13.9
Turnout		74,505	81.3	▲0.77
INC gain from Independent		Swing		

=== 1972 ===
1972 Andhra Pradesh Legislative Assembly election: Razole
Party	Candidate	Votes	%	±%
Independent	Bikkina Gopalakrishnarao	37,921	56.70	+13.10
INC	Rudraraju Ramalingaraju	28,959	43.30	−13.07
Majority		8,962	13.40	▲5.87
Turnout		66,880	80.53	▲1.40
Independent gain from INC		Swing		

=== 1967 ===
1967 Andhra Pradesh Legislative Assembly election: Razole
Party	Candidate	Votes	%	±%
INC	G. R. Nayinala	17,825	32.39	▼25.30
Independent	S. Balla	13,680	24.86	
CPI	R. Kanumuru	9,224	16.76	▼25.44
Independent	B. Akula	9,173	16.67	
Independent	V. Geddada	5,122	9.31	
Majority		4,145	7.53	▼8.06
Turnout		55,024	79.13	
INC hold		Swing		

=== 1962 ===
1962 Andhra Pradesh Legislative Assembly election: Razole
Party	Candidate	Votes	%	±%
INC	Gaddem Mahalakshmi	30,460	57.79	
CPI	Bhupathi Narayanamurty	22,244	42.20	▼2.82
Majority		8,216	15.59	▼6.94
Turnout		52,704		
INC gain from CPI		Swing		

=== 1955 ===
1955 Andhra State Legislative Assembly election: Razole
Party	Candidate	Votes	%	±%
CPI	Alluri Venkararamaraju	41,515	24.18	▲4.10
KMPP	Akula Buliswamy	38,599	22.49	▲4.59
CPI	Ganji Nageswararao	35,779	20.84	▲4.19
Independent	Pamula Prakasarao	27,589	16.07	▲2.93
Independent	Alluru Raju	20,132	11.73	
Independent	Neethipudi Rao	5,156	3	
Independent	Undru Rao	2,891	1.68	
Majority		38,695	22.53	▲20.35
Turnout		171,661	138.22	
CPI hold		Swing		

=== 1952 ===
1952 Madras State Legislative Assembly election: Razole
Party	Candidate	Votes	%	±%
CPI	Alluri Venkataramaraju	41,847	20.08%	
KMPP	Akula Buliswami	37,307	17.90%	
CPI	Ganji Nagaswara Rao	34,688	16.65%	
KMPP	Pamula Venkataratnam	27,386	13.14%	
INC	Boyi Bhimanna	27,311	13.11%	13.11%
INC	Mupparti Venkataratnam	23,118	11.10%	11.10%
RPI	Pamula Prakass Rao	12,653	6.07%	
Independent	Kanteti Narasimharaju	4,051	1.94%	
Margin of victory		4,540	2.18%	
Turnout		2,08,361	128.80%	
Registered electors		1,61,776		
CPI win (new seat)				

== See also ==
- List of constituencies of the Andhra Pradesh Legislative Assembly
