= Ganti Vijaya Kumari =

Indian politician

Member of Parliament, Lok Sabha
- In office 2002–2004
- Preceded by: G. M. C. Balayogi
- Succeeded by: G. V. Harsha Kumar
- Constituency: Amalapuram

Personal details
- Party: Telugu Desam Party
- Spouse: G. M. C. Balayogi
- Children: G. M. Harish Balayogi (son)

Ganti Vijaya Kumari is an Indian politician from the state of Andhra Pradesh. She served as a Member of Parliament in the 13th Lok Sabha, representing the Amalapuram constituency. She was elected in a 2002 by-election following the death of her husband, G. M. C. Balayogi, who was then the Speaker of the Lok Sabha.

== Career ==
The sudden death of Amalapuram MP and Lok Sabha Speaker Ganti Mohana Chandra Balayogi necessitated a by-election for the reserved constituency. Before fielding Balayogi's widow Ganti for the seat, senior members of the Telugu Desam Party (TDP) were considering her nomination to the Rajya Sabha. Ganti herself, being in a state of shock, was reluctant to contest the election and Balyogi's family wanted his sister to succeed him.

The Indian National Congress (INC) didn't contest the by-election and TDP had thought Ganti would win unopposed. Even a legislator of Bharatiya Janata Party was present when she filed her nomination. Only Bahujan Samaj Party and Republican Party of India placed their candidates against her and both forfeited their security deposit. She won by a margin of 3,13,660 votes.

Ganti took her oath of office on the first day of the 2002 monsoon session of the Lok Sabha. For the next general election TDP made Dunna Janardhana Rao its official candidate instead of her.

The spouses of the speakers of Lok Sabha are provided a house in New Delhi. Ganti, however, faced trouble in getting a house allocated.

== Personal life ==
Vijaya Kumari married G.M.C. Balayogi on 16 April 1982. Together they had one son and three daughters. Balayogi died in a helicopter accident on 3 March 2002.
