= Marteru =

Maruteru
- village
- Interactive map of Maruteru
- Location in Andhra Pradesh, India
- Country: India
- State: Andhra Pradesh
- District: West Godavari
- Mandal: Penumantra

Languages
  - Official: Telugu
- Time zone: UTC+5:30 (IST)
- PIN: 534122
- Telephone code: 08819
- Vehicle registration: AP
- Nearest city: Palakollu
- Lok Sabha constituency: Narasapur
- Vidhan Sabha constituency: Achanta

Marteru is a village in Penumantra mandal, West Godavari district, Andhra Pradesh, India. The village is famous for rice research center, established by the Government of India to conduct research on paddy crops. The center developed many new varieties of rice seeds. The nearest railway station is Chinta Parru Halt (CTPR) located at a distance of 10.51 km.

== Demographics ==
As of 2011 Census of India, Marteru had a population of 7527. The total population constitute, 3710 males and 3817 females with a sex ratio of 1029 females per 1000 males. 650 children are in the age group of 0–6 years, with sex ratio of 879. The average literacy rate stands at 86.77%.
