= Rapaka Vara Prasada Rao =

Indian politician

Member of Legislative Assembly Andhra Pradesh
- In office 23 May 2019 – 04 June 2024
- Preceded by: Gollapalli Surya Rao
- Succeeded by: Deva Varaprasad
- Constituency: Razole
- In office 2009–2014
- Preceded by: Alluri Krishnam Raju
- Succeeded by: Gollapalli Surya Rao
- Constituency: Razole

Personal details
- Born: Rapaka Vara Prasada Rao
- Party: YSR Congress Party
- Other political affiliations: Indian National Congress, Jana Sena Party
- Occupation: Politician

Rapaka Vara Prasada Rao is an Indian politician. He was elected to the Andhra Pradesh Legislative Assembly from Razole in the 2019 Andhra Pradesh Legislative Assembly election as a member of the Jana Sena Party and in the 2009 Andhra Pradesh Legislative Assembly election as a member of the Indian National Congress. He was the only member elected from the Jana Sena Party in 2019 Andhra Pradesh Assembly election.
