= Nadavapalli =

- Village
- Interactive map of Nadavapalli
- Location in Andhra Pradesh, India Nadavapalli (India)
- Coordinates: 16.596323°N 82.16932°E
- Country: India
- State: Andhra Pradesh
- Region: Konaseema
- District: Konaseema district

Languages
  - Official: Telugu
- Time zone: UTC+5:30 (IST)
- PIN: 533212

Nadavapalli is a village, located in Konaseema district in Katrenikona, in Andhra Pradesh state.
