= Giddi Satyanarayana =

Indian politician

Member of the Andhra Pradesh Legislative Assembly
- Incumbent
- Assumed office 2024
- Preceded by: Kondeti Chittibabu
- Constituency: Gannavaram, Konaseema

Personal details
- Party: Jana Sena Party

Giddi Satyanarayana is an Indian politician from Andhra Pradesh. He is a member of Jana Sena Party. He has been elected as the Member of the Legislative Assembly representing the Gannavaram, Konaseema Assembly constituency in 2024 Andhra Pradesh Legislative Assembly elections.
