= Bayya Suryanarayana Murthy =

Indian politician

MP
- Succeeded by: Kusuma Krishna Murthy
- Constituency: Eluru, Kakinada

Personal details
- Born: 29 October 1906 Nagaram, Razole, Madras Presidency, British Raj (now Nagaram, Andhra Pradesh, India)
- Died: 22 May 1979 (aged 72) New Delhi, India
- Party: Indian National Congress
- Spouse: Adilaxmi
- Children: 5
- Website: http://164.100.47.132/LssNew/biodata_1_12/876.htm

Bayya Suryanarayana Murthy, a.k.a. B. S. Murthy (29 October 1906 – 22 May 1979), was a journalist, poet, short story writer, essayist, and a six-term Parliamentarian He was born in 1906 to B. Nagaiah at Nagaram in Razole taluk, in East Godavari district, Andhra Pradesh.

He was awarded B.A, and BEd degrees from Government Arts College at Rajahmundry, Christian college and Law college in Madras. His proficiency in English earned him gold medals and several trophies for inter-collegiate debates and elocutions. He also served as the vice-president of the Andhra Provincial Journalists Association.

In the year 1937 he was elected as the Member of Parliament of Madras Legislative Assembly under the then affiliate party Indian National Congress. He then became the Minister for Industries and Labour of Madras Government in 1937 to 1939 and again in 1946 to 1947.

He was involved in the Indian freedom movement and took part in an individual satyagraha. During the years 1940-1942, he took active part in the Quit India Movement and was imprisoned for a period of about two years. In 1952, after India attained independence, he contested from Eluru constituency and was elected to the 1st Lok Sabha. In 1957 he contested for the Kakinada seat as an Indian National Congress candidate and won the election.

In the years 1962, 1967 and 1972, he was elected to the Lok Sabha. Between 1962-1967 he served as Minister for Health and Family Welfare in the Union Cabinet. He also served as the Member of Parliamentary Delegation to China in the year 1956, Parliamentary Secretary in the Ministry of Community development and Cooperation in March 1958, and in March 1959 to January 1966 served as the Minister for Community Development and Cooperation. In 1962 he led a delegation to Rio de Janeiro for the social service world conference.

In May 1970 he served as the leader of the Indian Delegation at the 23rd world health assembly in Geneva. Due to his services in the Indian system of medicine. he was awarded the Ayurveda Bandhu.

He had deep interests in youth movements and in the welfare of the weaker sections. He led the Satyagraha at Tirumala Venkateswara temple demanding the entry of the underprivileged in 1947 and was successful in this campaign. To honour Perunthalaivar M. C. Rajah works, Bayya Suryanarayana Murthy founded the M.C. Rajah Memorial Hostel for the college students of the underprivileged in 1944 at Saidapet in Madras.

He was an eminent author and was the editor of the Telugu weekly magazine Navjivan. He introduced essay prizes on the theme on social justice at both Osmania University and the Andhra University. He was also invited for a three-month lecture tour at Harvard University, in the United States of America. He has travelled extensively to countries like Europe, Burma, China, U.K, Thailand, Geneva, Uganda, Zurich, Frankfurt, Berne, U.S.S.R and West Berlin.

Murthy had three siblings. In 1927 he married Adilaxmi and they had five children; three sons, Late, Shri Bayya Nageshwara Rao, Late Shri Bayya Prakash Rao, Dr. Bayya Kishore and two daughters, Bayya Swarajyalakshmi and Kadevari Vijayalakshmi.

He was Hindu by religion. He had an excellent command over the English language and had written several short stories, essays and poems during his lifetime. Some the books which he authored include Revolt of Six Cores, Depressed and Oppressed: Forever in Agony, The Glimmer in Darkness, Always at the Helm of Service, Thou, the Curse (which was an under-print) and Andhra Virakumar (written in Telugu).

He died in 1979 and was succeeded by Kusuma Krishna Murthy. He is remembered today as a prominent leader and a parliamentarian in India. He had a very active political career and made achievements which earned him recognition for his exemplary contributions to the people of India. now the year 2026 oct 29th is the 120 birth anneversery.
