= Kondeti Chittibabu =

Indian politician (born 1954)

Member of Legislative Assembly, Andhra Pradesh
- In office 2019–2024
- Preceded by: Pulaparty Narayana Murty
- Succeeded by: Giddi Satyanarayana
- Constituency: Gannavaram

Personal details
- Party: Indian National Congress
- Other political affiliations: YSR Congress Party

Kondeti Chittibabu (born 1954) is an Indian politician from Andhra Pradesh. He won the 2019 Andhra Pradesh Legislative Assembly election from P. Gannavaram Constituency in East Godavari district on YSRCP ticket. In April 2024, he quit YSRCP.

== Early life and education ==
Babu was born in Nagaram village, Mamidikuduru Mandal, East Godavari district. His father Nageswara Rao hails from an agricultural family. He married Lakshmi and has three children, Vikas Babu, Stalin Babu and Devi Priyanka. He completed his schooling at SGG Parishad High School and his intermediate from Govt Junior College, both from Mamidikuduru village. Then, he did his Bachelor of Arts degree at Government Degree College, Razole and his post-graduation at VSM College, Ramachandrapuram, which is affiliated with Andhra University in 1992.

== Career ==
He started his political career as an independent in 1994 but lost the MLA seat from Nagaram to Undru Krishna Rao of TDP. He joined YSR Congress Party and contested the 2014 Andhra Pradesh Legislative Assembly Election from P. Gannavaram Constituency but lost to Pulaparthy Narayana Murthy of TDP by 13,505 votes. In the next election in 2019, he defeated Nelapudi Stalinbabu of TDP by a margin of 22,207 votes from the same seat. After he was dropped by YSRCP for the 2024 Assembly Election, he joined the Indian National Congress Party in April 2024.
