= Aithabathula Ananda Rao =

Indian politician

Member of the Andhra Pradesh Legislative Assembly
- Incumbent
- Assumed office 2024
- Preceded by: Pinipe Viswarup
- Constituency: Amalapuram

Personal details
- Party: Telugu Desam Party

Aithabathula Ananda Rao is an Indian politician from Andhra Pradesh. He is a member of Telugu Desam Party. He has been elected as the Member of the Legislative Assembly representing the Amalapuram Assembly constituency in 2024 Andhra Pradesh Legislative Assembly elections.
