= I. Polavaram, Konaseema district =

Island Polavaram
- Village
- Interactive map of Island Polavaram
- Location in Andhra Pradesh, India Island Polavaram (India)
- Coordinates: 16°38′39″N 82°14′26″E
- Country: India
- State: Andhra Pradesh
- District: Dr. B.R. Ambedkar Konaseema
- constituency: Mummidivaram (Assembly constituency)
- Talukas: I.Polavaram

Population (2011)
  - Total: 6,759

Languages
  - Official: Telugu తెలుగు
- Time zone: UTC+5:30 (IST)
- Postal Code: 533220
- Vehicle registration: AP05

I. Polavaram or Island Polavaram is a village in I. Polavaram Mandal, located in Dr. B.R. Ambedkar Konaseema district of the Indian state of Andhra Pradesh.
