= G. M. C. Balayogi =

Indian lawyer and politician (1951–2002)

Ganti Mohana Chandra Balayogi
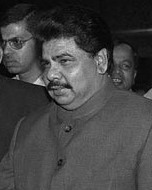
- Balayogi in 2001

12th Speaker of the Lok Sabha
- In office 24 March 1998 – 3 March 2002
- President: K. R. Narayanan
- Deputy: P. M. Sayeed
- Preceded by: Purno Agitok Sangma
- Succeeded by: Manohar Joshi

Member of Parliament, Lok Sabha
- In office 10 March 1998 – 3 March 2002
- Preceded by: K. S. R. Murthy
- Succeeded by: Vijaya Kumari Ganti
- Constituency: Amalapuram, Andhra Pradesh
- In office 20 June 1991 – 10 May 1996
- Preceded by: Kusuma Murthy
- Succeeded by: K. S. R. Murthy
- Constituency: Amalapuram, Andhra Pradesh

Personal details
- Born: 1 October 1951 Yedurulanka, Andhra Pradesh, India
- Died: 3 March 2002 (aged 50) Kaikalur, Andhra Pradesh, India
- Party: Telugu Desam Party
- Spouse: Ganti Vijaya Kumari
- Children: 4; including G. M. Harish Balayogi

Ganti Mohana Chandra Balayogi (1 October 1951 – 3 March 2002) was an Indian lawyer and politician. Balayogi served as the 12th Speaker of the Lok Sabha from 1998 until his death in a helicopter crash in March 2002. He was the youngest speaker of the Lok Sabha and the first Dalit to hold the post.

== Early career ==
Growing up in a small Village, Balayogi had to travel to G.Vemavaram village for his primary education. He received his Post Graduate in Kakinada and a law degree from Andhra University, Visakhapatnam.

Balayogi began practicing law in 1980 in Kakinada under the guidance of Gopalaswamy Shetty, and in 1985, was selected as a First Class Magistrate. He then resigned from this post and returned to the bar to resume legal practice. In 1986, he took over as the vice-chairman of the Cooperative Town Bank of Kakinada, and in 1987, was elected as the Chairman of the East Godavari Zilla Praja Parishad. He was the First Dalit speaker in Loksabha.

== Politics ==
In 1991, Balayogi was elected to the 10th Lok Sabha under the Telugu Desam Party ticket. He lost this seat in the 1996 general elections, but continued political work in his community and was soon elected to the Andhra Pradesh Legislative Assembly in a by-election from the Mummidivaram Assembly constituency. Subsequently, he was appointed the Minister of Higher Education in the Government of Andhra Pradesh.

In 1998, Balayogi was elected into parliament; he became the 12th Speaker of Lok Sabha (24 March 1998) and again for the 13th Lok Sabha (22 October 1999). As the Speaker, he chaired the Business Advisory Committee, Rules Committee, General Purposes Committee and Standing Committee of the Conference of Presiding Officers of Legislative Bodies in India, and he presided over the Indian Parliamentary Group, National Group of Inter-Parliamentary Union and India Branch of the Commonwealth Parliamentary Association. Along with these duties, Balayogi headed many Indian Parliamentary Delegations to foreign countries, while hosting visiting countries as well.

== Electoral History ==
=== Lok Sabha ===
Year	Constituency	Party	Votes	%	Opponent	Party	Votes	%	Result	Margin	%
1991	Amalapuram	TDP	2,73,490	53.19	Kusuma Krishna Murthy	INC	1,86,003	36.18	Won	+87,487	+17.01
1996	Amalapuram	TDP	2,16,346	34.82	K. S. R. Murthy	INC	2,45,477	39.51	Lost	-29,131	-4.69
1998	Amalapuram	TDP	2,86,953	43.57	K. S. R. Murthy	INC	1,96,713	29.87	Won	+90,240	+13.70
1999	Amalapuram	TDP	3,68,476	55.56	Gollapalli Suryarao	INC	2,49,597	37.63	Won	+1,18,879	+17.93

== Death ==
On 3 March 2002, Balayogi died in crash of a Bell 206 helicopter in Kaikalur, Krishna District, Andhra Pradesh. The chopper, it began to lose height after returning from Bhimavaram. The rotor hit the crown of one of the many coconut palms in the area at Kovvadalanka village in Mandavalli mandal, 100 km from Vijayawada. The Speaker, his security officer D. Satya Raju and pilot Capt.G. V. Menon died instantly.

== Legacy ==
G. M. C. Balayogi Athletic Stadium was named in his memory.

Political offices
Preceded by P.A. Sangma	Speaker of Lok Sabha; 1998–2002	Succeeded by Manohar Joshi
