= Kusuma Murthy =

Indian politician

Member of Parliament, Lok Sabha
- In office 1989–1991
- Constituency: Amalapuram
- In office 1980–1984
- Constituency: Amalapuram
- In office 1977–1979
- Constituency: Amalapuram

Personal details
- Party: Indian National Congress
- Education: MA
- Alma mater: Nagpur University

Kusuma Krishna Murthy was an Indian politician and member of parliament who represented Amalapuram parliamentary constituency in the sixth, seventh and ninth Lok Sabha. He was associated with the Indian National Congress.

== Biography ==
He was born on 11 September 1940 in East Godavari district, Andhra Pradesh. He received his education from Sree Konaseema Bhanoji Ramars College and later attended Andhra and Nagpur University.

He served at various posts during his political career, including convenor of Joint Select Committee, Committee on Welfare of Scheduled Castes and Scheduled Tribes from 1980-82. He also served in the Ministry of Petroleum & Chemicals in 1990, in addition to serving as joint secretary of the All India Congress Committee from November 1983 to January 1985.
