= Mummidivaram =

Mummidivaram munivaram
- Town
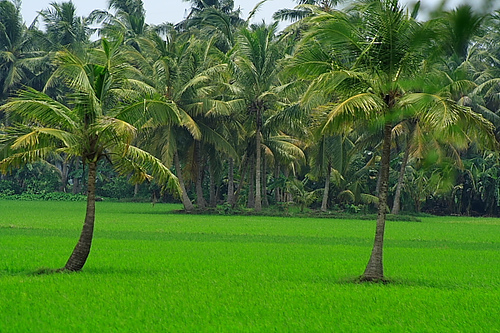
- krapa chintalapudi

- Location in Andhra Pradesh, India
- Coordinates: 16.6500°N 82.1167°E
- Country: India
- State: Andhra Pradesh
- District: Dr. B.R. Ambedkar Konaseema
- tehsil: Mummidivaram

Government
  - MLA: Dattla Bujji babu

Area
  - Total: 27.30 km^{2} (10.54 sq mi)
- Elevation: 0 m (0 ft)

Population (2011)
  - Total: 23,732
  - Density: 869.3/km^{2} (2,251/sq mi)

Languages
  - Official: Telugu
- Time zone: UTC+5:30 (IST)
- PIN: 533216
- Telephone code: 08856
- Vehicle Registration: AP05 (Former); AP39 (from 30 January 2019)

Mummidivaram is a town in Dr. B.R. Ambedkar Konaseema district of Andhra Pradesh, India. The Mummidivaram revenue block was formed out of the Amalapuram tehsil in July 1969. It is the second largest town in Konaseema district.

== Geography ==
Mummidivaram is located at 16.6500°N 82.1167°E. It has an average elevation of 0 meters (0 feet).

== Governance ==
The town was upgraded from Gram panchayat to Nagar panchayat on 23 June 2011.

=== Politics ===
Mummidivaram is an assembly constituency in Andhra Pradesh. There are 1,89,229 registered voters as on 10.01.2012 in Mummidivaram constituency (2nd largest in East Godavari district).

List of Elected Members:

- 1978 - Moka Sri Vishnu Prasada Rao
- 1983 - Valtati Raja sakkubai
- 1985 - Pandu Krishna Murti
- 1989 and 1994 - Battina Subba Rao
- 1999 - GMC Balayogi and Chelli Vivekananda
- 2004 - Pinipe Viswarupu
- 2019 - Ponnada Satish
- 2014 - Datla Subba Raju(Bucchi Babu)
- 2024 - Datla Subba Raju (Buchibabu)

Late GMC Balayogi also served as Member of Parliament for Amalapuram and was a Loksabha speaker. During his tenure the Konaseema area saw major developments and he played a key role in the construction of various bridges across the Godavari river. The people of Konaseema revere him as their hero and his statues were worshiped across the Konaseema area.

== Transport ==
Mummidivaram is located on NH216 . The nearest major railway stations to the town are Kakinada Town railway station, Palakollu railway station, Narasapur railway station and Rajahmundry railway station which 45km, 50km, 55km, 60km from Mummidivaram. The nearest airport to Mummidivaram is Rajahmundry Airport which is 75km away.
