= I. Polavaram mandal =

- Mandal
- Interactive map of I. Polavaram mandal
- Country: India
- State: Andhra Pradesh
- District: Dr. B.R. Ambedkar Konaseema district
- Population according to 2011 Census: 67,434
- Number of Villages: 11
- Area in Sq Km: 129.42
- Time zone: UTC+5:30 (IST)
- Vehicle Registration: AP05 (Former); AP39 (from 30 January 2019)

The I. Polavaram mandal is one of the 22 mandals in Dr. B.R. Ambedkar Konaseema district of Andhra Pradesh. As per census 2011, there are 11 villages in this mandal.

== Demographics ==
The I. Polavaram mandal has a total population of 67,434 as per the Census 2011, out of which 33,977 are males and 33,457 are females. The average sex ratio is 985. The total literacy rate is 69%.

== Towns and villages ==
=== Villages ===
1. Bhairavapalem
2. G.Moolapolam
3. G Vemavaram
4. Guttenadeevi
5. Gogullanka
6. I. Polavaram
7. Kesanakurru
8. Komaragiri
9. Muramalla
10. Pasuvullanka
11. Patha Injaram
12. T. Kothapalle
13. Thillakkuppa
14. Yedurulanka

== See also ==
- List of mandals of Andhra Pradesh
