= Deva Varaprasad =

Indian politician

Member of Legislative Assembly Andhra Pradesh
- Incumbent
- Assumed office 2024
- Preceded by: Rapaka Vara Prasada Rao
- Constituency: Razole

Personal details
- Party: Janasena Party

Deva Varaprasad is an Indian politician from Andhra Pradesh. He is a member of Janasena Party. He has been elected as the Member of the Legislative Assembly representing the Razole Assembly constituency in 2024 Andhra Pradesh Legislative Assembly elections.
