= Kothapeta mandal =

- Mandal
- Interactive map of Kothapeta mandal
- Country: India
- State: Andhra Pradesh
- District: Dr. B.R. Ambedkar Konaseema
- Population according to 2011 Census: 77,859
- Number of Villages: 10
- Area in Sq Km: 79.57
- Time zone: UTC+5:30 (IST)

Kothapeta mandal is one of the 22 mandals in Dr. B.R. Ambedkar Konaseema district of Andhra Pradesh. The headquarters of the mandal is located in Kothapeta village. As per census 2011, there are 10 villages in this mandal.

== Demographics ==
Kothapeta mandal has total population of 77,859 as per the Census 2011 out of which 39,053 are males while 38,806 are females. The average Sex Ratio of Kothapeta Mandal is 994. The total literacy rate of Kothapeta Mandal is 79%.

== Towns and villages ==
=== Villages ===
1. Avidi
2. Billa Kurru
3. Ganti
4. Khandrika
5. Kothapeta
6. Mandapalle
7. Modekurru
8. Palivela
9. Vadapalem
10. Vanapalle

== See also ==
- List of mandals in Andhra Pradesh
