= Katrenikona =

- Village
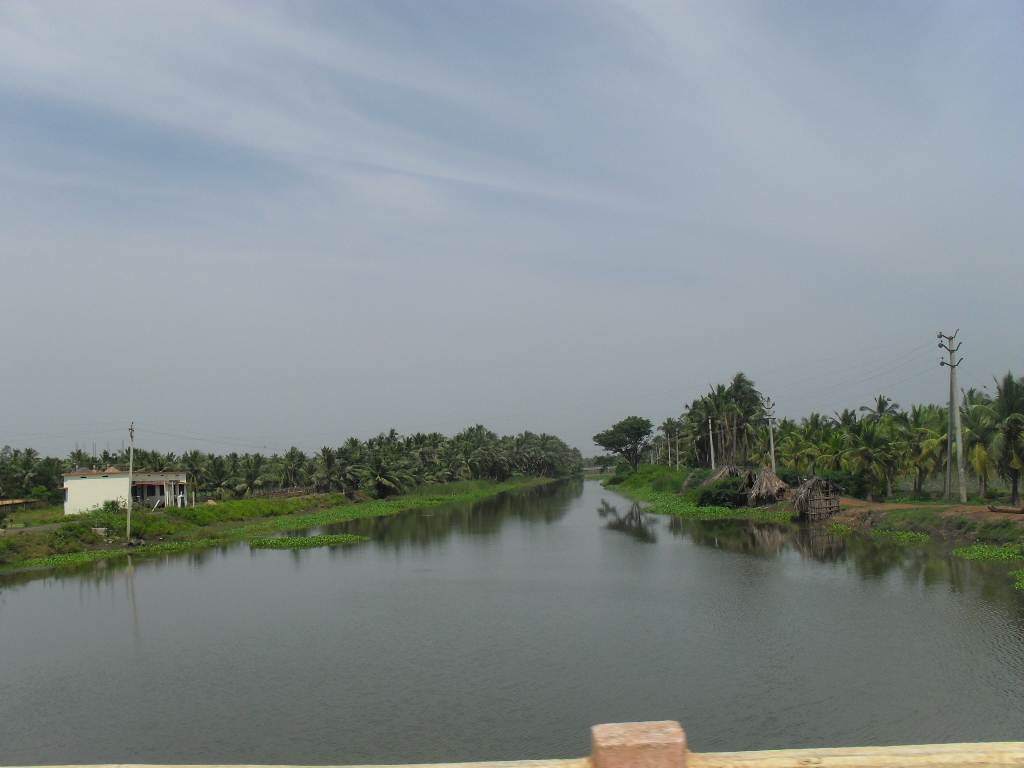
- Godavari canal near Katrenikona
- Interactive map of Katrenikona
- Location in Andhra Pradesh, India Katrenikona (India)
- Coordinates: 16.5818377°N 82.153793°E
- Country: India
- State: Andhra Pradesh
- District: Dr. B.R. Ambedkar Konaseema

Area
  - Total: 28.47 km^{2} (10.99 sq mi)

Population (2011)
  - Total: 13,678
  - Density: 480.4/km^{2} (1,244/sq mi)

Languages
  - Official: Telugu
- Time zone: UTC+5:30 (IST)
- PIN: 533212
- Telephone code: 91-
- Vehicle Registration: AP05 (Former); AP39 (from 30 January 2019)

Katrenikona is a village in Dr. B.R. Ambedkar Konaseema district of the Indian state of Andhra Pradesh. It is located in Katrenikona Mandal of Amalapuram revenue division of the district.

== See also ==
- Koppigunta
