= Amalapuram =

- District Headquarter; Municipal Town
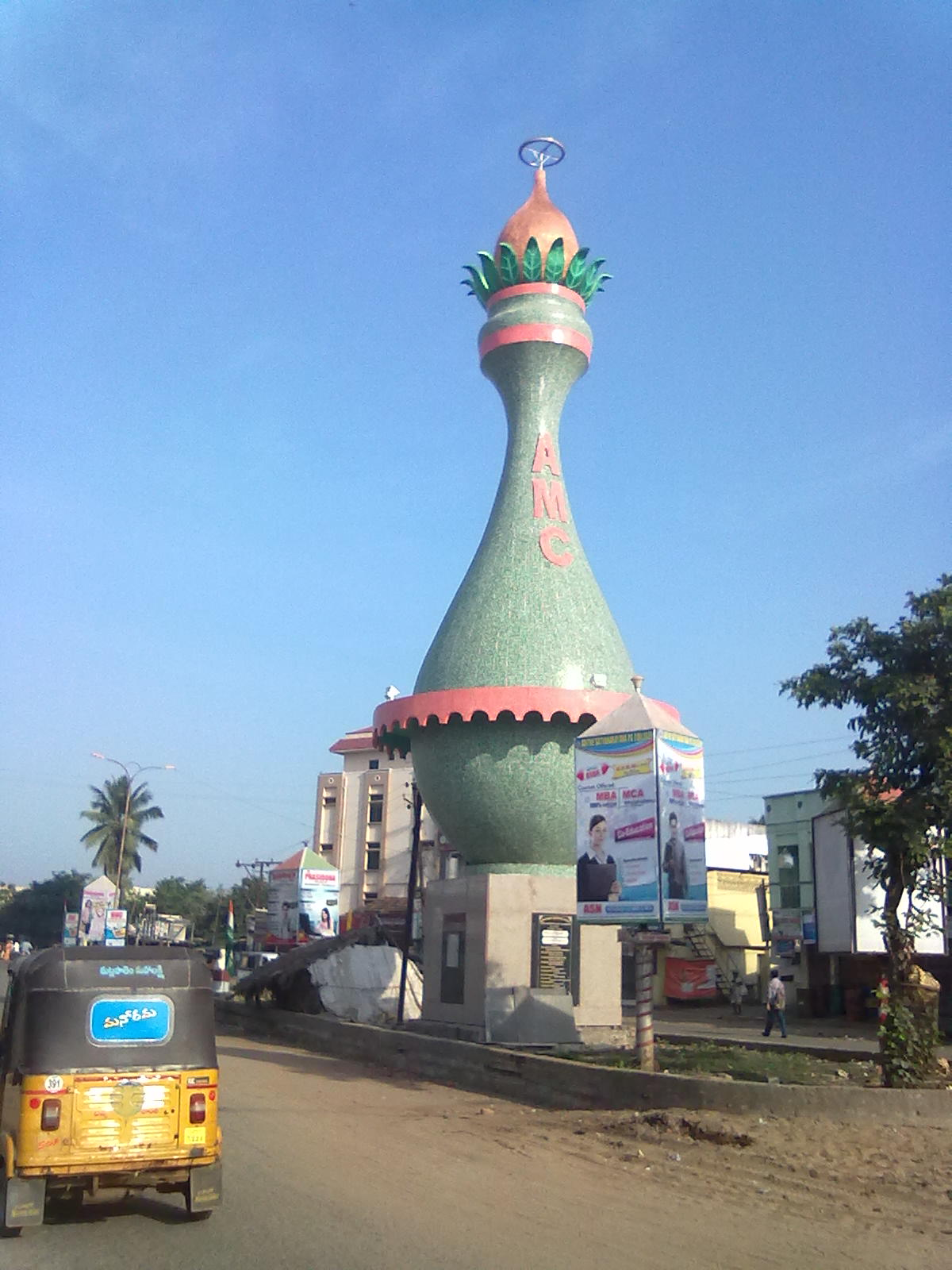
- Poornakumbham sculpture in Amalapauram
- Interactive map of Amalapuram
- Location in Andhra Pradesh, India Amalapuram (India)
- Coordinates: 16.5787°N 82.0061°E
- Country: India
- State: Andhra Pradesh
- District: Dr. B. R. Ambedkar Konaseema

Government
  - Type: Municipality
  - Body: Amalapuram Municipal Council
  - MLA: Aithabathula Anandarao

Area
  - Total: 7.20 km^{2} (2.78 sq mi)
- Elevation: 3 m (9.8 ft)

Population (2011)
  - Total: 53,231
  - Density: 7,390/km^{2} (19,100/sq mi)

Languages
  - Official: Telugu
- Time zone: UTC+5:30 (IST)
- PIN: 533201
- Telephone code: 08856
- Vehicle Registration: AP05 (Former); AP39 (from 30 January 2019)

Amalapuram is a town in the Indian state of Andhra Pradesh. It is the district headquarters and largest town of Dr. B. R. Ambedkar Konaseema district. It is the mandal and divisional headquarters of Amalapuram mandal and Amalapuram revenue division respectively. The town is situated in the delta of Konaseema.

== History ==
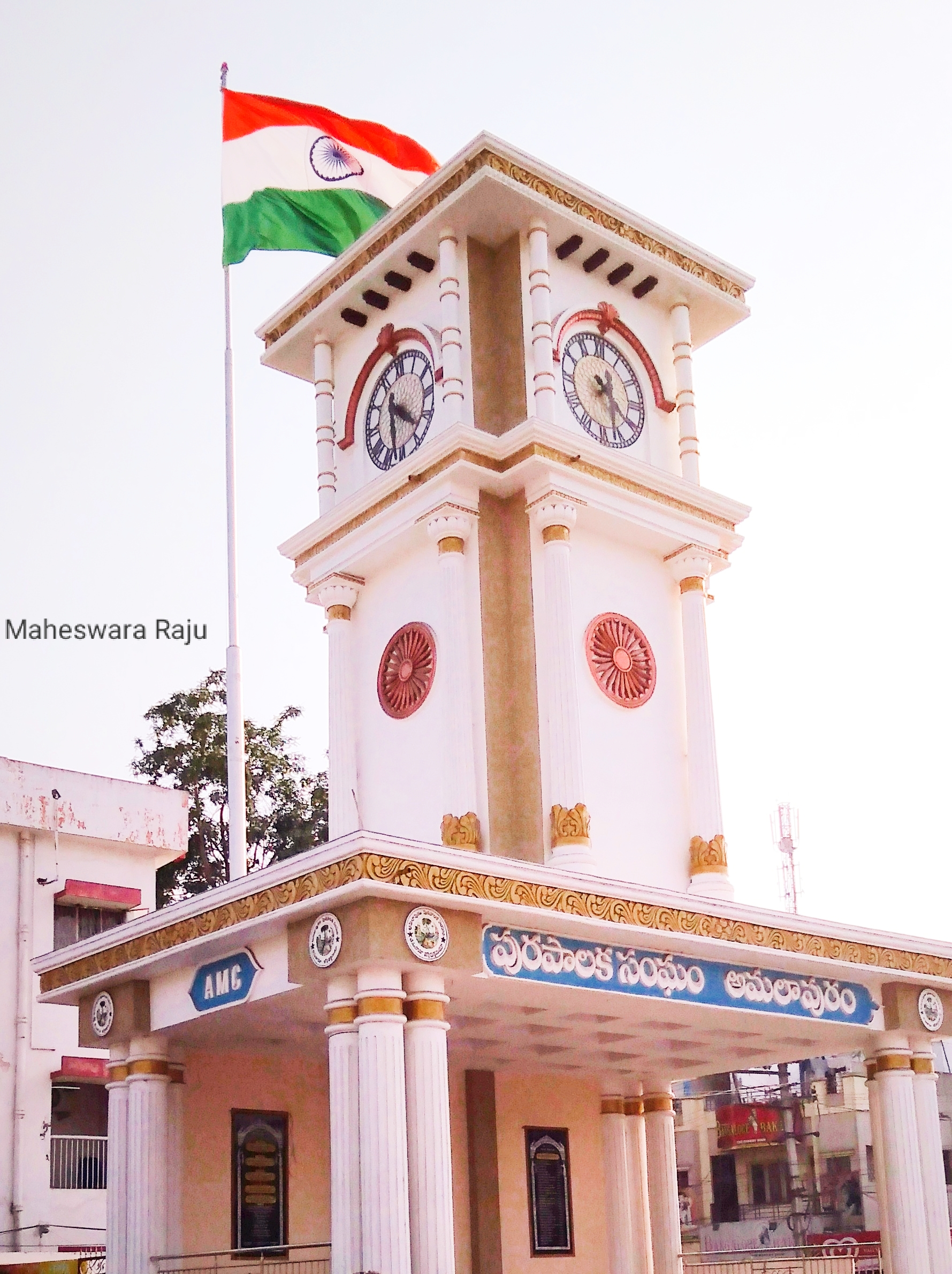
Clock Tower

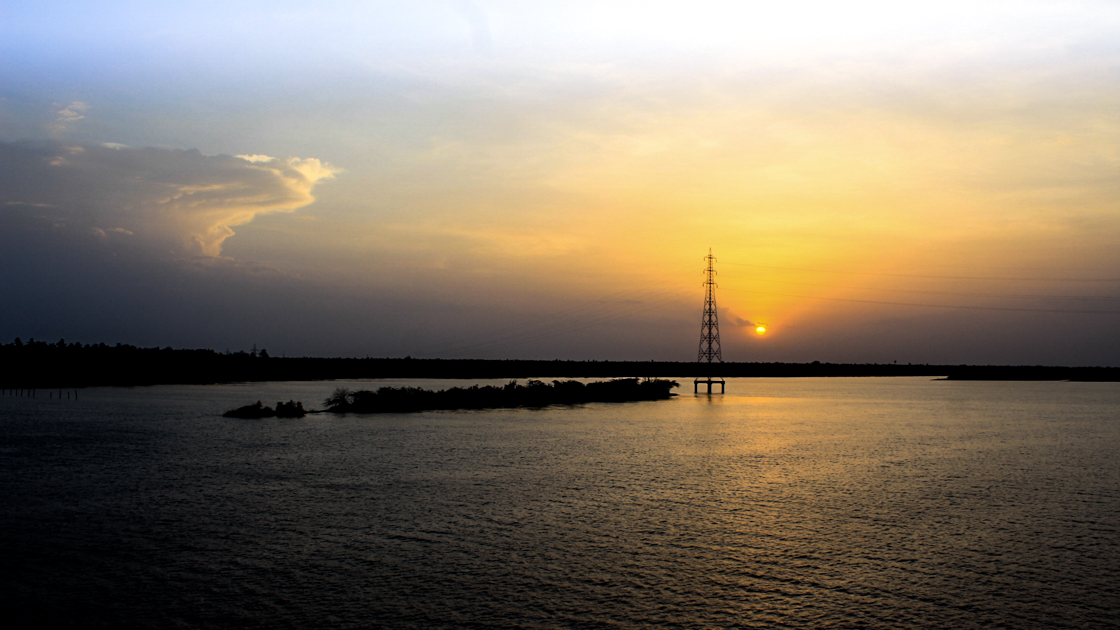
Godavari River in Pasarlapudi village near Amalapuram

Amalapuram was originally named Amlipuri. Some of its temples are dedicated to Amaleswarudu.

Amalapuram is also known Panchalingapuram as it is the location of five temples to Shiva as Amaleswarudu, Sidheswarudu, Ramalingeswarudu, Chandramouleeswarudu and Chennamalleeswarudu. Amalapuram is the most advanced town in Konaseema district. It is center of the district for education and financial institutes. There are approximately 65 schools and colleges, six engineering colleges and one medical college in the area. It is one among few parliament constituencies in India which do not have a railway connectivity.

== Geography ==
Amalapuram is spread over an area of 7.20 km^{2} (2.78 mi^{2}). It is located at 16.5787°N 82.0061°E. It has an average elevation of 2 m (6 ft 7 in). It is the largest town of Konaseema district.

== Demographics ==
According to the 2011 Census of India, Amalapuram Municipality had a population of 53,231, with 26,485 males and 26,746 females, resulting in a sex ratio of 1,010 females per 1,000 males. The population of children aged 0–6 years was 4,635.

The average literacy rate of Amalapuram was 89.80%, with male literacy at 93.24% and female literacy at 86.39%. Scheduled Castes (SC) constituted 13.23% of the population, and Scheduled Tribes (ST) made up 1.48%.

The total area of the municipality is 7.20 km^{2}, resulting in a population density of approximately 7,393 persons per square kilometre.

Source: Census of India 2011, CensusIndia.gov.in

== Amalapuram Mandal ==
Amalapuram is also the headquarters of the Amalapuram mandal, which includes the town and 16 surrounding villages. According to the 2011 Census, the mandal had a total population of 141,693 — comprising 70,973 males and 70,720 females — with a sex ratio of 996 females per 1,000 males.

The mandal spans an area of approximately 80.06 km^{2}. The population density of the mandal is around 1,770 persons per square kilometre.

Children in the 0–6 age group numbered 13,365, and the average literacy rate in the mandal was 84.22%, with male literacy at 88.35% and female literacy at 80.09%.

Source: Census of India 2011, CensusIndia.gov.in

== Governance ==
=== Politics ===
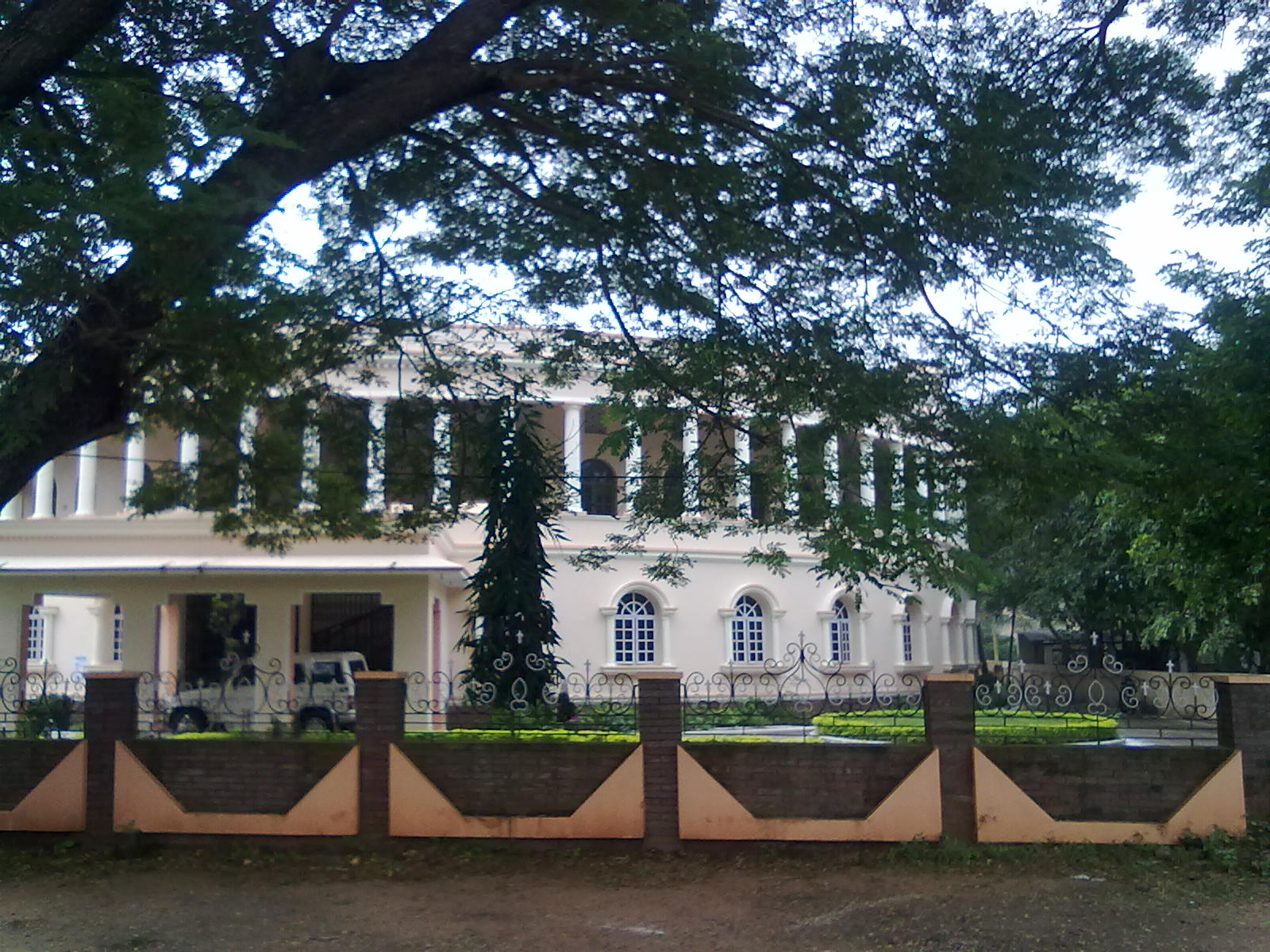
Government Office in Amalapuram

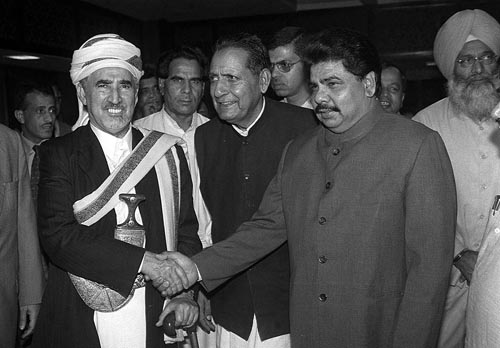
GMC Balayogi (To the right), Former Speaker of Parliament

Amalapuram is one of the 25 Lok Sabha constituencies in Andhra Pradesh.

== Transport ==
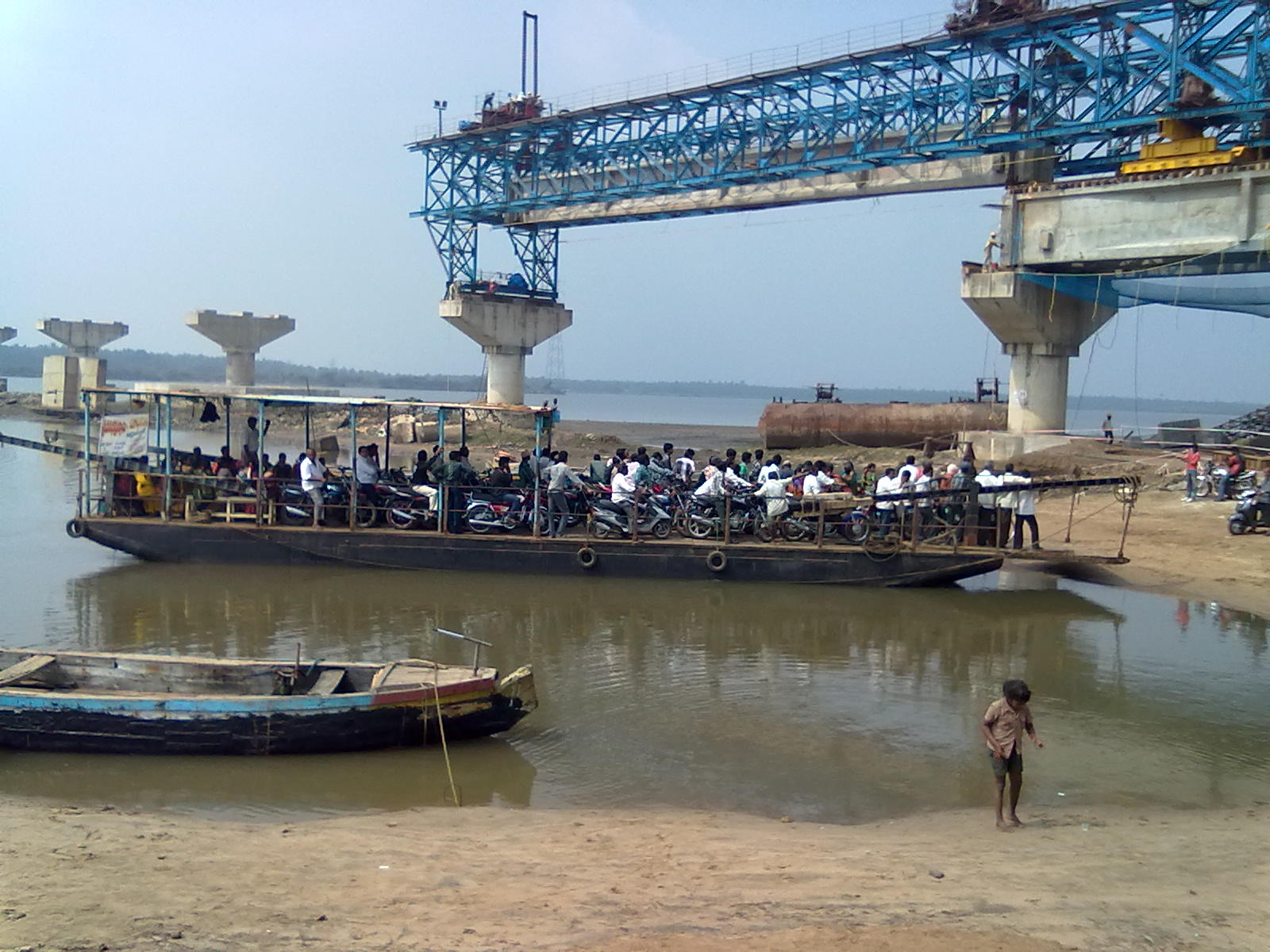
A Ferry in Godavari river

The Andhra Pradesh State Road Transport Corporation operates bus services from Amalapuram bus station. Regular buses between Rajahmundry, Kakinada non-stop, hourly based Vizag and Vijayawada from evening buses to Hyderabad available.

A railway station currently under construction (in 2023).

== Education ==
Amalapuram is home to Sree Konaseema Bhanoji Ramars College (SKBR College), established in 1951, the oldest college in the Konaseema region and among the earlier higher education institutions in Andhra Pradesh. The town houses the Konaseema Institute of Medical Sciences (KIMS), a reputed medical college and hospital serving the region.

Amalapuram has the Government Junior College for Girls, a public institution offering intermediate education for female students in Amalapuram.

Amalapuram also hosts multiple engineering colleges affiliated with JNTU Kakinada and approved by AICTE: Srinivasa Institute of Engineering and Technology (SIET), offers diploma and B.Tech programs in areas such as AI/ML, Electronics & Communications, and Electrical & Electronics Engineering. Amalapuram Institute of Management Sciences & College of Engineering, provides B.E./B.Tech and M.Tech programs, along with diploma courses. BVC Institute of Technology & Science (BVCITS), a private AICTE‑accredited institution established in 2002, offering engineering (B.Tech/M.Tech), management (MBA), computer applications (MCA), and diploma courses.

== Notable people ==
- G. M. C. Balayogi, former Lok Sabha Speaker
- Kudupudi Prabhakar Rao, former Minister
- Pradeep Machiraju, anchor and actor
- Ram Madhav, General Secretary, Bharatiya Janata Party
- Bayya Suryanarayana Murthy, former MP of Rajya Sabha, journalist, essayist, short-story writer
- Devi Sri Prasad, Tollywood music composer and singer
- Kala Venkata Rao, former Minister
- Satwiksairaj Rankireddy, badminton player
