= Outline of Andhra Pradesh =

State of India, located on its SE coast

Locator map of Andhra Pradesh in India

The following outline is provided as an overview of and topical guide to Andhra Pradesh:

Andhra Pradesh is one of the 28 states of India, situated on the southeastern coast of the country. It is the seventh-largest state with an area of 162,970 km^{2} (62,920 sq mi) and the tenth-most-populous state with 49,577,103 inhabitants as per 2011 census of India. On 2 June 2014, the north-western portion of the state was bifurcated to form a new state of Telangana. In accordance with the Andhra Pradesh Reorganisation Act, 2014. Amaravati serves as the capital of the state with the largest city being Visakhapatnam. Telugu, used by majority of people and is the official language along with English.

== General reference ==
=== Names ===
- Common name: Andhra Pradesh
- Pronunciation: /ˌɑːndrə prəˈdɛʃ/
- Native name = ఆంధ్రప్రదేశ్
- Official name: Andhra Pradesh
- Nicknames
  - "Sunrise State"
- Adjectivals
  - Telugu
- Demonyms
  - Telugu
- Abbreviations and name codes
  - ISO 3166-2 code: IN-AP
  - Vehicle registration code: AP

=== Rankings (amongst India's states) ===
- by population (2011 census): 10th
- by area: 7th
- by crime rate (2015): 12th
- by gross domestic product (GDP) (2014): 11th
- by Human Development Index (HDI): 15th
- by life expectancy at birth: 13th
- by literacy rate: 25

== Geography of Andhra Pradesh ==
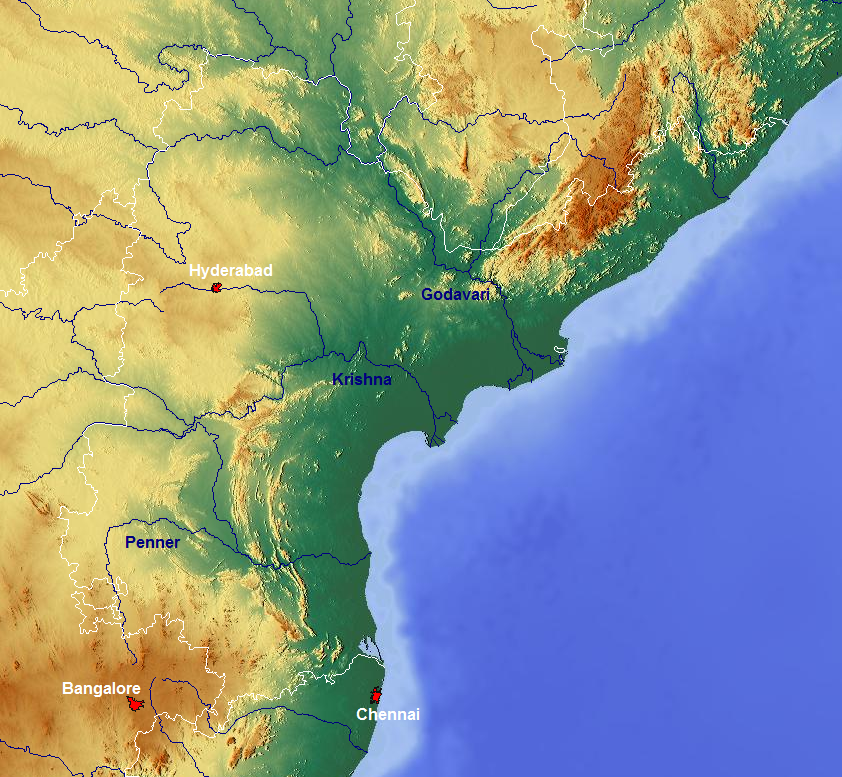
Topographic map of Andhra Pradesh

Geography of Andhra Pradesh

- Andhra Pradesh is: an Indian state, a state of the Republic of India.

=== Location of Andhra Pradesh ===
- Location:
  - Northern Hemisphere
  - Eastern Hemisphere
    - Eurasia
      - Asia
        - South Asia
          - Indian subcontinent
            - India
              - South India
  - Time zone: Indian Standard Time (UTC+05:30)

=== Places in Andhra Pradesh ===
Places in Andhra Pradesh

- Highest point: Arma Konda
- Monuments in Andhra Pradesh
  - List of state protected Monuments in Andhra Pradesh
  - List of Monuments of National Importance in Andhra Pradesh

=== Environment of Andhra Pradesh ===
- Climate of Andhra Pradesh
  - Monsoon
- Natural vegetation and wildlife of Andhra Pradesh
  - Fauna of Andhra Pradesh
    - List of birds of Andhra Pradesh

==== Geographic features of Andhra Pradesh ====
- Beaches of Andhra Pradesh
- Coastline of Andhra Pradesh
- Rivers in Andhra Pradesh
- Mountains of Andhra Pradesh
  - Eastern Ghats jindagad is the highest peak in AP.

=== Protected areas of Andhra Pradesh ===
- Wildlife sanctuaries – Andhra Pradesh has six Wildlife Sanctuaries:
  1. Kambalakonda Wildlife Sanctuary
  2. Papikonda Wildlife Sanctuary
  3. Coringa Wildlife Sanctuary
  4. Krishna Wildlife Sanctuary
  5. Rollapadu Wildlife Sanctuary
  6. Sri Penusila Narasimha Wildlife Sanctuary
- National parks of Andhra Pradesh
  1. Sri Venkateswara National Park
  2. Indira Gandhi Zoological Park

=== Regions of Andhra Pradesh ===
- Coastal Andhra
- Rayalaseema

==== Administrative divisions ====
- Andhra Pradesh Capital Region
  - Andhra Pradesh Capital Region Development Authority
- List of revenue divisions in Andhra Pradesh

===== Districts of Andhra Pradesh =====
Andhra Pradesh political map

Districts of Andhra Pradesh – Andhra Pradesh is subdivided into 28 districts

- Alluri Sitharama Raju district
- Anakapalli district
- Anantapur district
- Annamayya district
- Bapatla district
- Chittoor district
- East Godavari district
- Eluru district
- Guntur district
- Kadapa district
- Kakinada district
- Konaseema district
- Krishna district
- Kurnool district
- Markapuram district
- NTR district
- Nandyal district
- Nellore district
- Palnadu district
- Parvathipuram Manyam district
- Polavaram district
- Prakasam district
- Sri Sathya Sai district
- Srikakulam district
- Tirupati district
- Visakhapatnam district
- Vizianagaram district
- West Godavari district

===== Mandals of Andhra Pradesh =====
- Mandals in Andhra Pradesh

===== Municipalities of Andhra Pradesh =====
- Municipalities in Andhra Pradesh
  - Urban agglomerations in Andhra Pradesh
  - Cities in Andhra Pradesh by area
  - Cities in Andhra Pradesh by population
  - Major cities in Andhra Pradesh
    - Visakhapatnam
    - Vijayawada
    - Guntur
    - Tirupati
  - Revenue divisions in Andhra Pradesh

=== Demographics of Andhra Pradesh ===
Demographics of Andhra Pradesh

== Government and politics of Andhra Pradesh ==
Politics of Andhra Pradesh

- Political families of Andhra Pradesh
- Political parties
  - Telugu Desam Party
  - YSR Congress Party

=== Elections in Andhra Pradesh ===
Elections in Andhra Pradesh

- Andhra Pradesh State Election Commission
- 1955 Andhra Pradesh Legislative Assembly election
- 1983 Andhra Pradesh Legislative Assembly election
- 1985 Andhra Pradesh Legislative Assembly election
- 1989 Andhra Pradesh Legislative Assembly election
- 1994 Andhra Pradesh Legislative Assembly election
- 1999 Andhra Pradesh Legislative Assembly election
- 2004 Andhra Pradesh Legislative Assembly election
- 2009 Andhra Pradesh Legislative Assembly election
- 2014 Andhra Pradesh Legislative Assembly election
- 2012 Andhra Pradesh by-election
- 2019 Andhra Pradesh Legislative Assembly election

=== Union government in Andhra Pradesh ===
- Rajya Sabha members from Andhra Pradesh
- Andhra Pradesh Congress Committee
- Indian general election, 1962 (Andhra Pradesh)
- Indian general election, 1967 (Andhra Pradesh)
- Indian general election, 1971 (Andhra Pradesh)
- Indian general election, 1977 (Andhra Pradesh)
- Indian general election, 1980 (Andhra Pradesh)
- Indian general election, 1984 (Andhra Pradesh)
- Indian general election, 1989 (Andhra Pradesh)
- Indian general election, 1991 (Andhra Pradesh)
- Indian general election, 1996 (Andhra Pradesh)
- Indian general election, 1998 (Andhra Pradesh)
- Indian general election, 1999 (Andhra Pradesh)
- Indian general election, 2004 (Andhra Pradesh)
- Indian general election, 2009 (Andhra Pradesh)
- Indian general election, 2014 (Andhra Pradesh)
- Indian general election, 2019 (Andhra Pradesh)

=== Branches of the government of Andhra Pradesh ===
Government of Andhra Pradesh

==== Executive branch ====
- Governors
- Chief Ministers
- List of cabinet ministers of Andhra Pradesh
- Andhra Pradesh Secretariat

==== Legislative branch ====
Andhra Pradesh Legislature

- Legislative Assembly
  - List of constituencies of Andhra Pradesh Legislative Assembly
- Andhra Pradesh Legislative Council

==== Judicial branch ====
- Andhra Pradesh High Court

=== Law and order in Andhra Pradesh ===
- Andhra Pradesh and Madras Alteration of Boundaries Act
- Andhra Pradesh Reorganisation Act, 2014
- Law enforcement in Andhra Pradesh
  - Anti-Corruption Bureau, Andhra Pradesh
  - Andhra Pradesh Police
  - Andhra Pradesh Police Academy

== History of Andhra Pradesh ==
History of Andhra Pradesh

== Culture of Andhra Pradesh ==
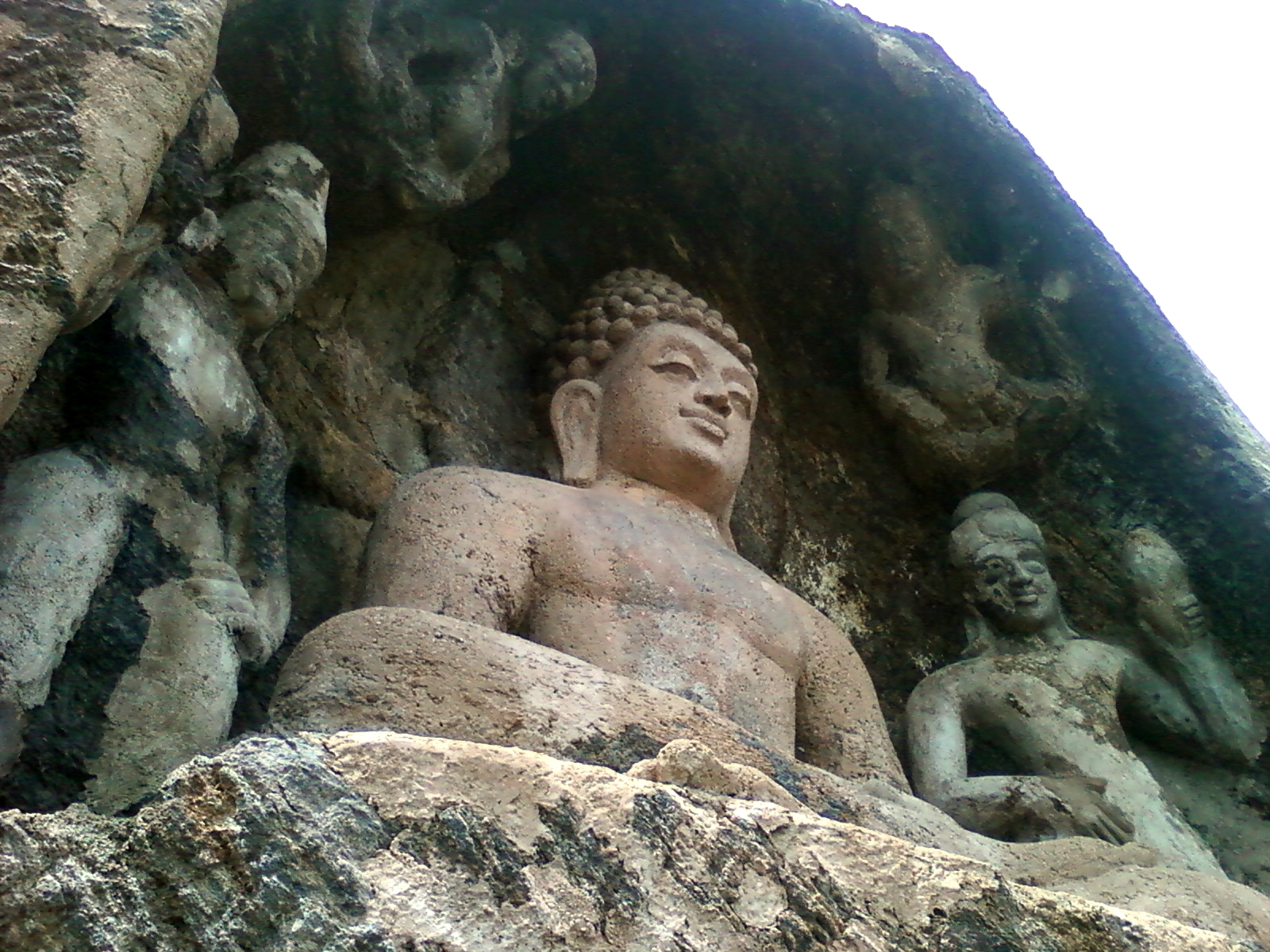
Rock cut Buddha Statue at Bojjanakonda

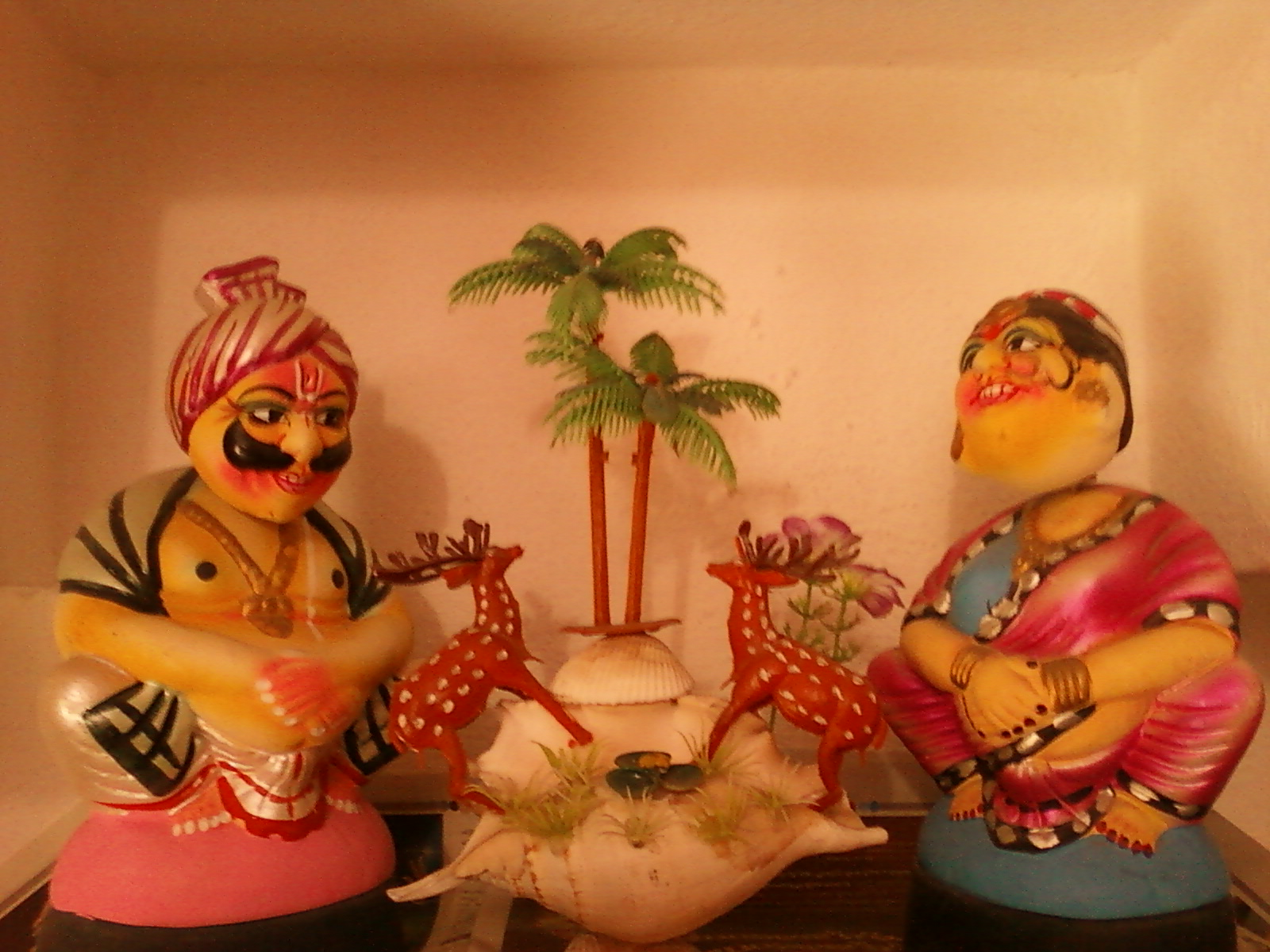
Kondapalli toys at a house in Vijayawada

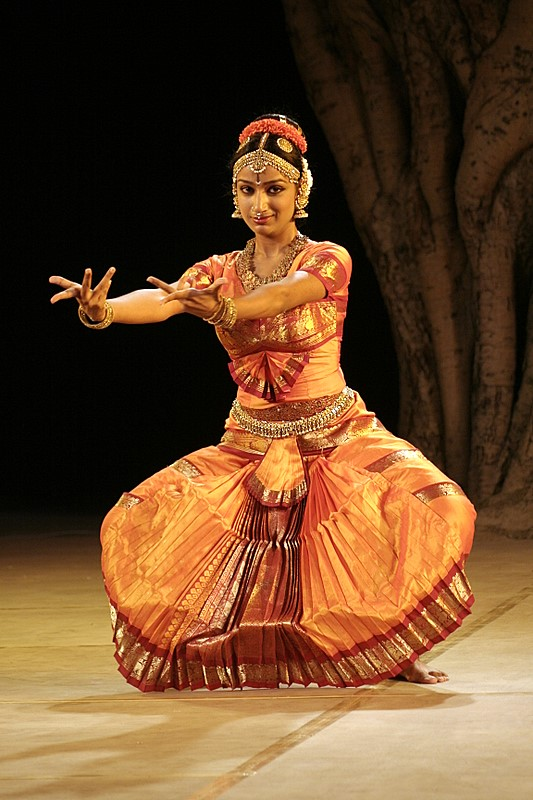
A Kuchipudi performance

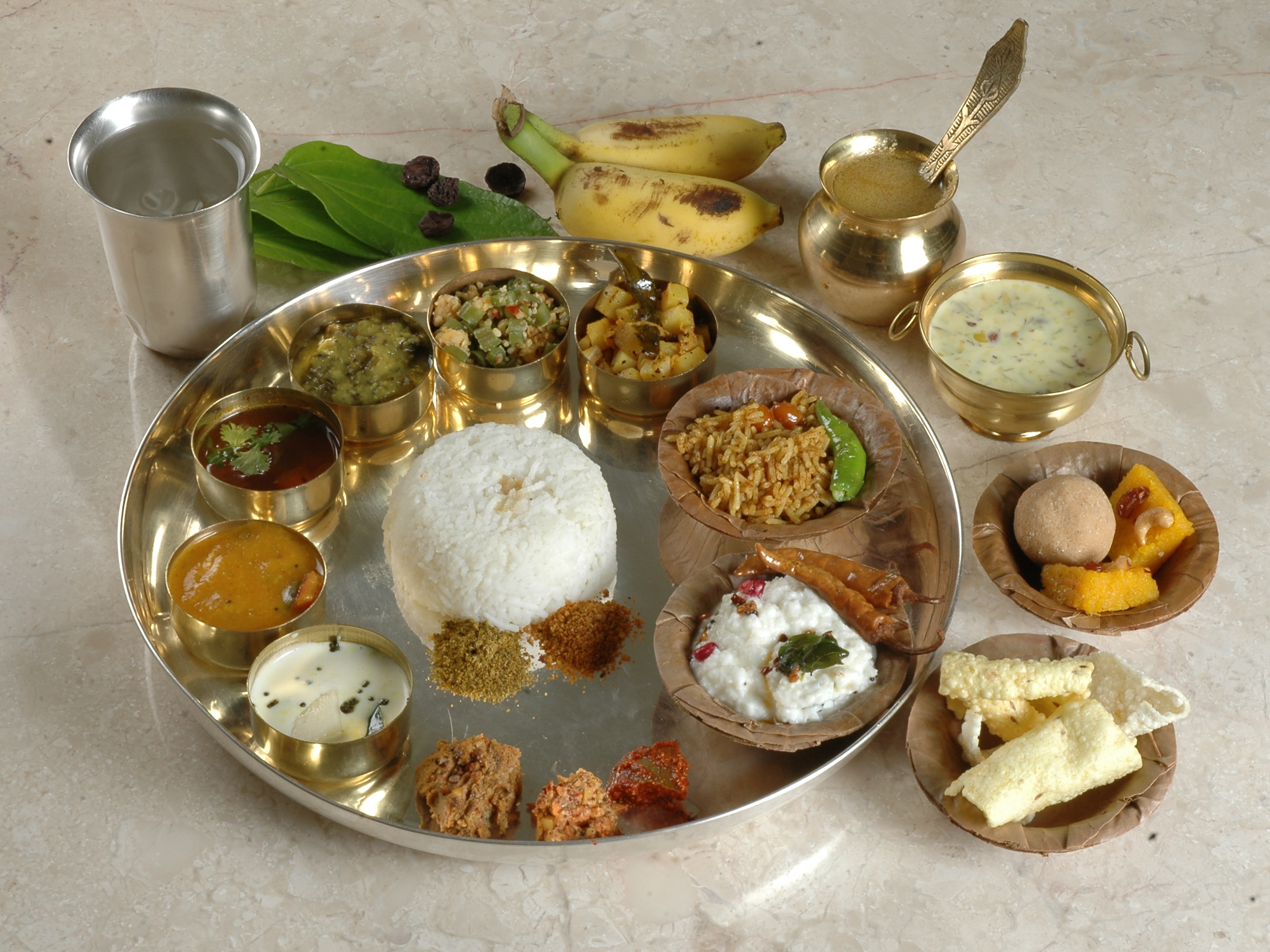
A Vegetarian Andhra Meal platter

Culture of Andhra Pradesh

- Games and toys of Andhra Pradesh
  - Traditional games of Andhra Pradesh
  - Kondapalli Toys
- Telugu language
- Tourism in Andhra Pradesh

=== The arts in Andhra Pradesh ===
- Telugu cinema
- Telugu theatre
  - Shadow puppets of Andhra Pradesh

==== Architecture in Andhra Pradesh ====
- Temples of Andhra Pradesh

==== Dance in Andhra Pradesh ====
- Kuchipudi
- Andhra Natyam
- Bhamakalapam
- Veeranatyam
- Vilasini Natyam

==== Literature of Andhra Pradesh ====
Telugu literature

- Nannayya
- Tikkana
- Yerrapragada
- Kandukuri Veeresalingam

==== Music of Andhra Pradesh ====
Music of Andhra Pradesh

- Annamacharya
- Tyagaraja
- Kshetrayya
- Bhadrachala Ramadas
- Ghantasala
- Burra katha

=== Cuisine of Andhra Pradesh ===
Cuisine of Andhra Pradesh

- Telugu cuisine
  - Pickles
  - Gongura
  - Avakaya
  - Pootharekulu

=== Festivals in Andhra Pradesh ===
- Ugadi (Telgu New Year)
- Sankranthi
- Dasara
- Vinayaka Chathurthi
- Eid ul-Fitr
- Easter
- Bakrid
- Deepavali

=== People of Andhra Pradesh ===
- Telugu people
- Ethnic groups of Andhra Pradesh
- List of people from Andhra Pradesh

=== Religion in Andhra Pradesh ===
Religion in Andhra Pradesh (2011)
1. Hinduism (90.9%)
2. Islam (7.30%)
3. Christianity (1.38%)
4. Jainism (0.05%)
5. Sikhism (0.02%)
6. Buddhism (0.01%)
7. Other (0.01%)
8. Not Stated (0.34%)

Religion in Andhra Pradesh

- Christianity in Andhra Pradesh
  - Lutheran Churches in Andhra Pradesh
- Hinduism in Andhra Pradesh
  - Temples of Andhra Pradesh

=== Sports in Andhra Pradesh ===
Sports in Andhra Pradesh

- Swarnandhra Pradesh Sports Complex
- Cricket in Andhra Pradesh
  - Andhra Pradesh cricket team
  - List of Andhra Pradesh cricketers
  - Cricket grounds in Andhra Pradesh
  - Andhra Pradesh Cricket Association
- Football in Andhra Pradesh
  - Andhra Pradesh football team
- Motor sports in Andhra Pradesh
  - Andhra Pradesh Motor Sports Club

=== Symbols of Andhra Pradesh ===
Symbols of Andhra Pradesh

- Animal: Blackbuck
- Bird: Indian roller
- Dance: Kuchipudi
- Emblem of Andhra Pradesh
- Flower: Water lily
- Fruit: Mango
- Song: "Maa Telugu Thalliki"
- Sport: Kabaddi
- Tree: Neem

== Economy and infrastructure of Andhra Pradesh ==
Economy of Andhra Pradesh

- Agriculture in Andhra Pradesh
  - Andhra Pradesh Forest Department
- Economic development in Andhra Pradesh
  - Andhra Pradesh Capital Region Development Authority
  - The Federation of Andhra Pradesh Chambers of Commerce and Industry
  - Andhra Pradesh Industrial Infrastructure Corporation
- Energy in Andhra Pradesh
  - Power sector of Andhra Pradesh
  - Transmission Corporation of Andhra Pradesh (electricity)
  - Andhra Pradesh Power Generation Corporation
  - Andhra Pradesh Central Power Distribution Company
  - Free electricity to farmers (Andhra Pradesh)
- Tourism in Andhra Pradesh
  - Andhra Pradesh Tourism Development Corporation
- Transport in Andhra Pradesh
  - List of airports in Andhra Pradesh
  - Rail transport in Andhra Pradesh
    - Andhra Pradesh Express
    - Andhra Pradesh Sampark Kranti Express
  - Road system of Andhra Pradesh
    - Andhra Pradesh State Road Transport Corporation
    - List of state highways in Andhra Pradesh
      - State Highway 2 (Andhra Pradesh)
      - State Highway 188 (Andhra Pradesh)
  - Ports and harbours of Andhra Pradesh
- Water supply and sanitation in Andhra Pradesh
  - List of dams and reservoirs in Andhra Pradesh

== Education in Andhra Pradesh ==
Education in Andhra Pradesh

- Andhra Pradesh Library Association
- Andhra Pradesh United Teachers Federation
- Primary education in Andhra Pradesh
  - Andhra Pradesh Residential School, Kodigenahalli
  - Andhra Pradesh Residential School, Sarvail
- Andhra Pradesh Board of Intermediate Education
- Andhra Pradesh Board of Secondary Education
  - List of institutions of higher education in Andhra Pradesh
  - Andhra Pradesh Residential Degree College
  - Andhra Pradesh Open University

== Health and safety in Andhra Pradesh ==
- Andhra Pradesh Pollution Control Board
- Andhra Pradesh State Disaster Response and Fire Services Department

== See also ==
- Outline of India
- Telugu language
- Telugu people
- Telugu script
- 1977 Andhra Pradesh cyclone
- 1990 Andhra Pradesh cyclone
- 2009 Andhra Pradesh Chief Minister helicopter crash
- Andhra Pradesh (magazine)
- Andhra Pradesh Congress Committee
- Andhra Pradesh Housing Board
- Andhra Pradesh Mica Mine Workers Union
- Andhra Pradesh Public Service Commission
- Andhra Pradesh Randomized Evaluation Studies (APRESt)
- Andhra Pradesh State Handloom Weavers Cooperative Society
- Andhra Pradesh State Wakf Board
- Andhra Pradesh Vaidya Vidhana Parishad
- Fee Reimbursement Scheme (Andhra Pradesh)
- SC, ST Sub-Plan (Andhra Pradesh)
- Snake Cell Andhra Pradesh
- The Andhra Pradesh State Christian (Minorities) Finance Corporation
