= Arma Konda =

Mountain peak in the Eastern Ghats, India

- Sitamma Konda
- Location within Andhra Pradesh

Highest point
- Elevation: 1,680 m (5,510 ft)
- Prominence: 1,290 m (4,230 ft)
- Isolation: 907 km (564 mi)
- Listing: List of Indian states and territories by highest point
- Coordinates: 18°13′41″N 82°43′23″E

Geography
- Location: Alluri Sitharama Raju district, Andhra Pradesh, India
- Parent range: Eastern Ghats

Arma Konda is a mountain peak in the northern part of the Eastern Ghats and located in Godavari basin. It is located in the Madugula Konda sub-range north of Paderu village in Alluri Sitharama Raju district in Andhra Pradesh. The peak is named as Sitamma Konda in the Survey of India maps.

At 1,680 m (5,510 ft), it is the highest peak in Andhra Pradesh. The peak has a topographic isolation of 907 km (564 mi), second only to Anamudi in India.

== See also ==
- Geography of Andhra Pradesh
- List of mountains in India
- List of mountains by elevation
