= Education in Andhra Pradesh =

Education in Indian state

As per the 2011 census of India, Andhra Pradesh (post reorganisation) has an overall literacy rate of 67.35% (males 74.77%, females 59.96%), significantly lower than the overall national average of 74.04%. Among the Indian states and union territories, it stands at 32nd position. There were a total of 29,859,982 literates: 16,549,514 males and 13,310,468 females. In terms of district-wise literates, united East Godavari has the most with 3,348,077 and united Vizianagaram has the least with 1,238,388. The government also implements fee reimbursement scheme for the economically backward sections of the state.

== Primary and secondary education ==
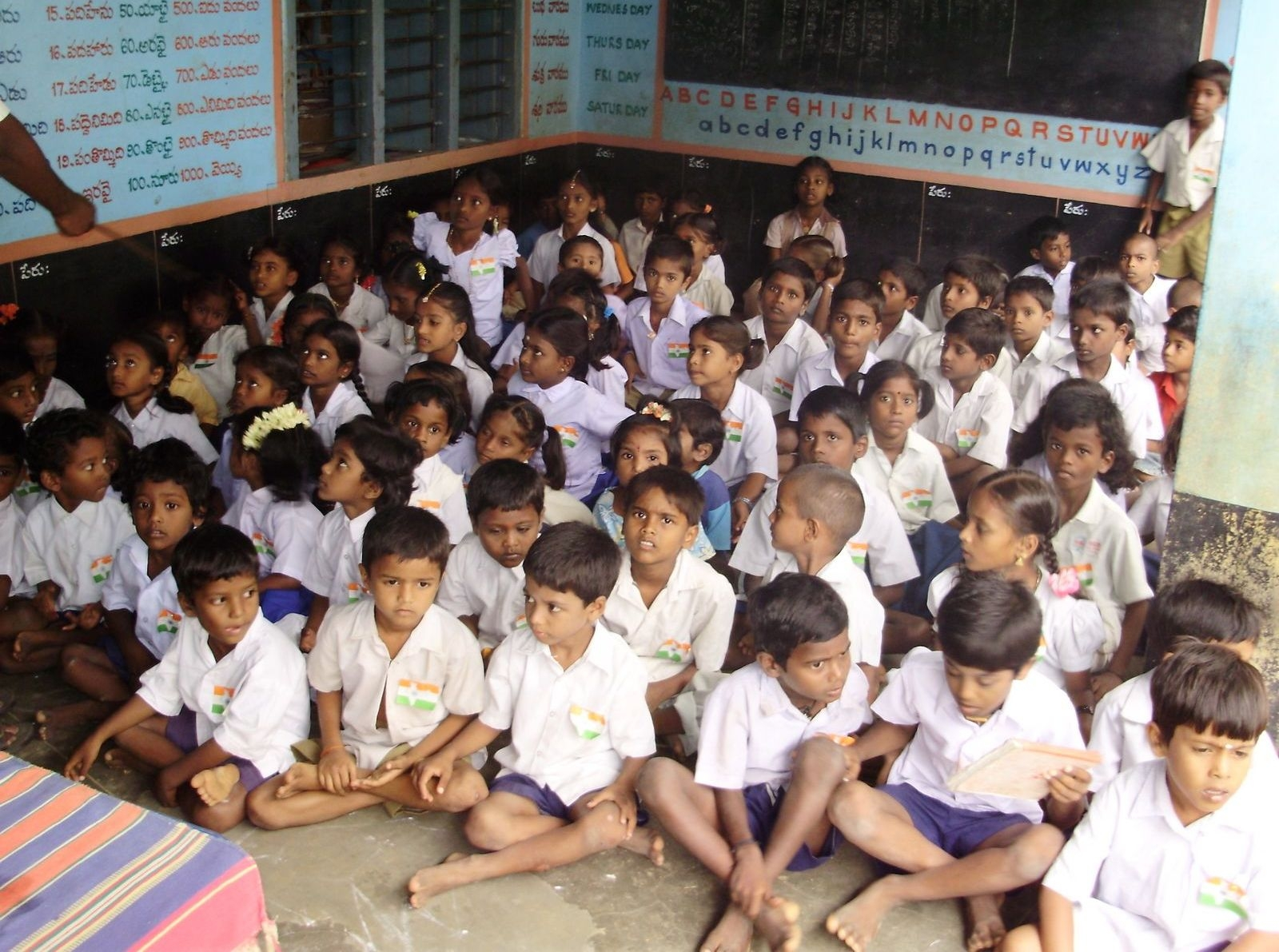
An elementary school at Chittoor

The School Education Department of Andhra Pradesh, the largest department of the state, manages and regulates schools in various districts of the state. The primary and secondary school education is imparted by government, aided and private schools. These schools are categorized as urban, rural and residential schools. As per the child info and school information report (2018–19), there were a total of 7,041,568 students, enrolled in 62,063 schools respectively. As per the students appeared for the Secondary School Certificate exam (2005), a majority of the students preferred Telugu and English as the medium of instruction. While, Urdu, Odia, Tamil, Kannada and Hindi were opted by a few.

The Andhra Pradesh Board of Secondary Education (Directorate of Government Examinations) administers the Secondary School Certificate (SSC) examination. For the 2019 SSC exam, more than 6 lakh students have appeared and recorded an overall pass percentage of 94.88%, a little increase from 94.48% of the previous year. In terms of district-wise pass percentage, East Godavari stood at the top with 98.19% and Nellore at the bottom with 83.19%. Schools which recorded a 100% pass percentage were 5,464, out of 11,000. By 2024, the pass percentage had risen to 86.69%, with girls outperforming boys (89.17% vs. 84.32%). The pass rate fell to 81.14% in 2025.

The state initiated education reforms in 2020 by creating six types of schools namely satellite foundation school (pre primary), foundational schools (pre primary - class II), foundational school plus (pre primary - class V) and pre High school (class III - class VII/VIII) and high school (class III - Class X) and high school plus (class III - Class XII). Transition to English medium education in all government schools started in the academic year 2020-2021 is expected to reach completion by 2024-25. 1000 government schools are affiliated to CBSE in the year 2022-23 as an initial step and the bilingual text books was adopted to ease the transition. The state government is going ahead with English medium based on the parents survey despite protests and courtcases. The state initiative is being funded in part by loan from World Bank to the tune of 250M$ over 2021-2026 through "Supporting Andhra's Learning Transformation" (SALT) project to improve the learning outcomes of children upto class II level. Following a change of state government after the 2024 elections, the transition of schools to Central Board of Secondary Education (CBSE) examinations was deferred: in September 2024, students at the 1,000 schools that had shifted to CBSE affiliation were directed to continue writing state board (BSEAP) examinations for the 2024–25 academic year, after internal assessments showed a high failure rate among students tested on the CBSE pattern.

== Technical education ==
Technical education under the state control consists of Polytechnic and ITI for which admissions are centralised and conducted online. There are 85 government and aided, 175 private polytechnics in the state.

== Higher education ==
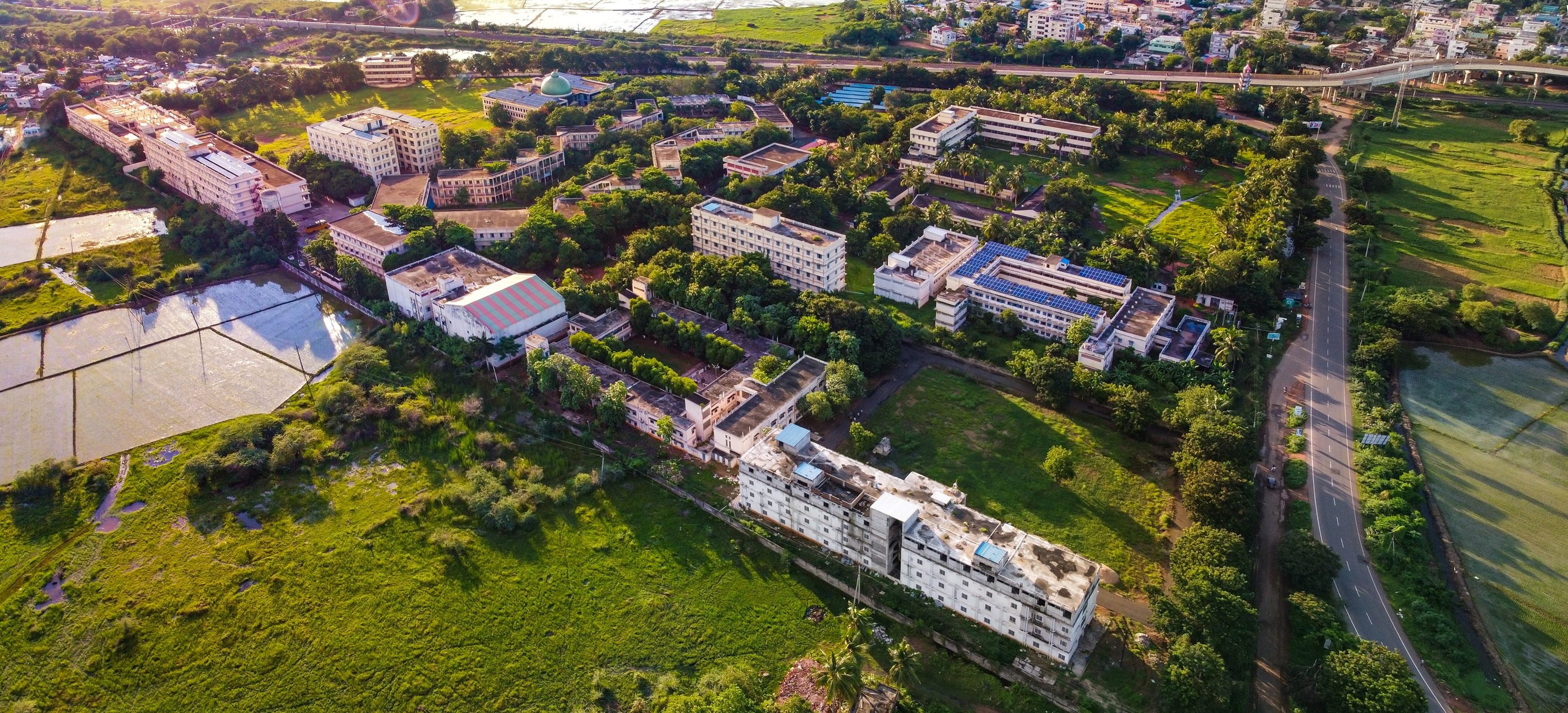
C.R.Reddy Educational Institutions, Eluru

There are 169 government degree colleges and 55 private aided degree colleges in the state. 66 government colleges and 48 private aided colleges have valid NAAC grades. State has achieved 35.1% gross enrollment ratio, gender parity index of 0.84 as per AISHE 2019-20. AP state council of higher education organises various entrance tests for different streams and conducts counselling for admissions.

== See also ==
- Telugu language policy
