= Beaches of Andhra Pradesh =

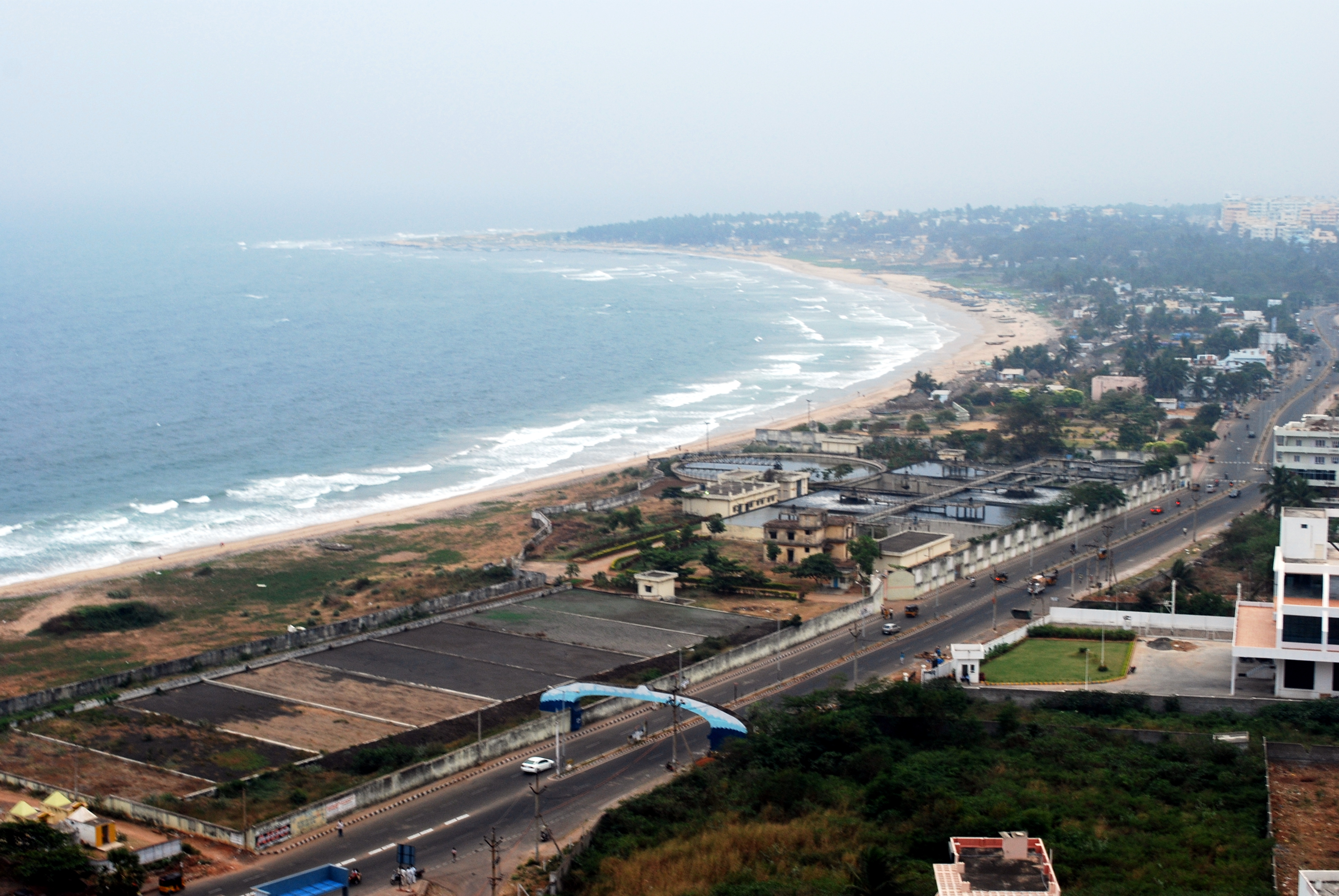
Aerial view of beach and coastline of Visakhapatnam

The state of Andhra Pradesh in India has a coastline of 970 km^{2} (370 sq mi) and hence, there exist many beaches. The seacoast extends along the Bay of Bengal from Srikakulam district to Nellore district.

The state tourism board APTDC promotes tourism and develops infrastructure in tourist destinations. APTDC maintains certain water sports facilities. The tourism board maintains Haritha Beach Resort at most of the beaches for promoting tourism.

== Beaches ==
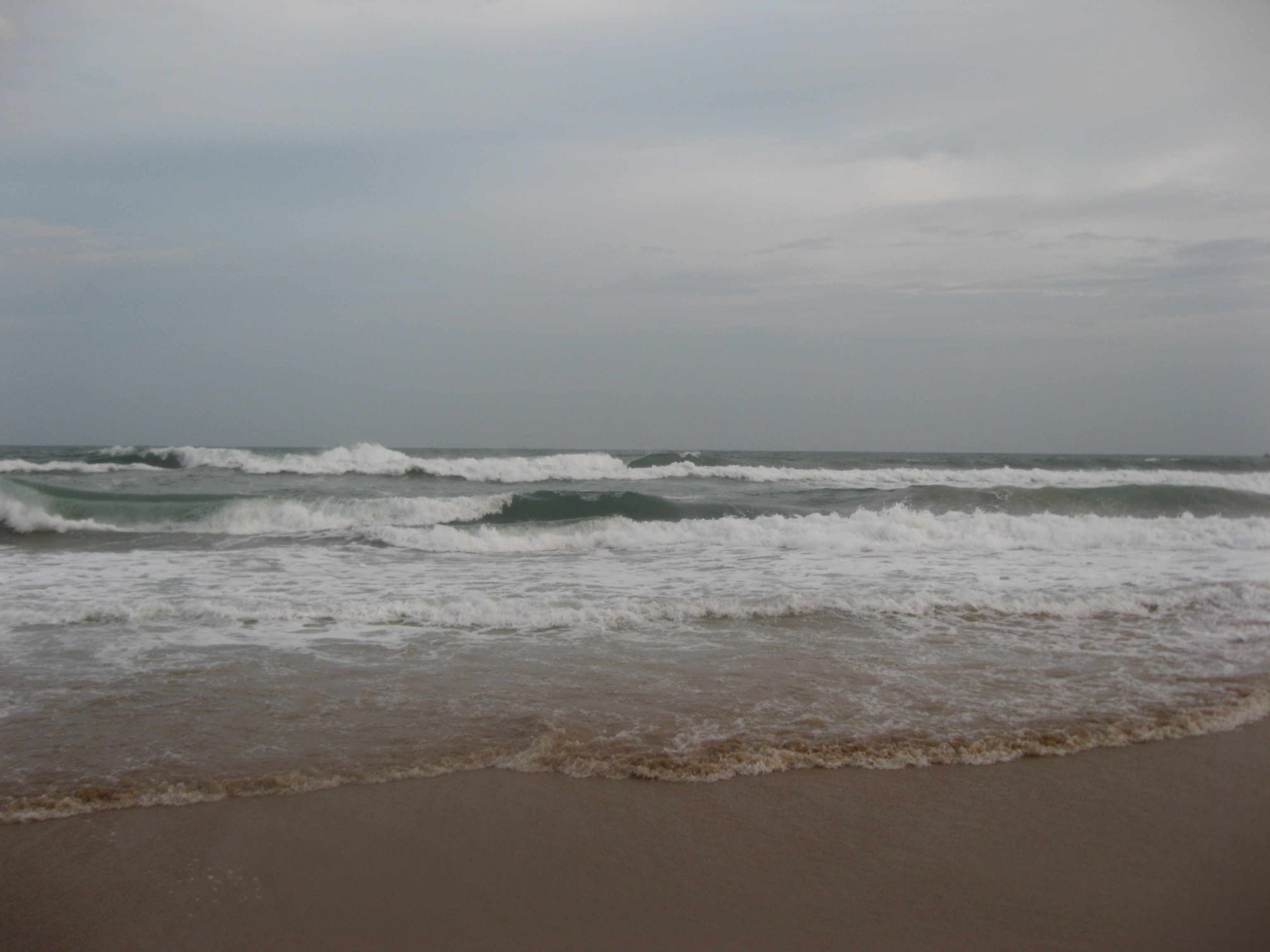
RK Beach, Visakhapatnam

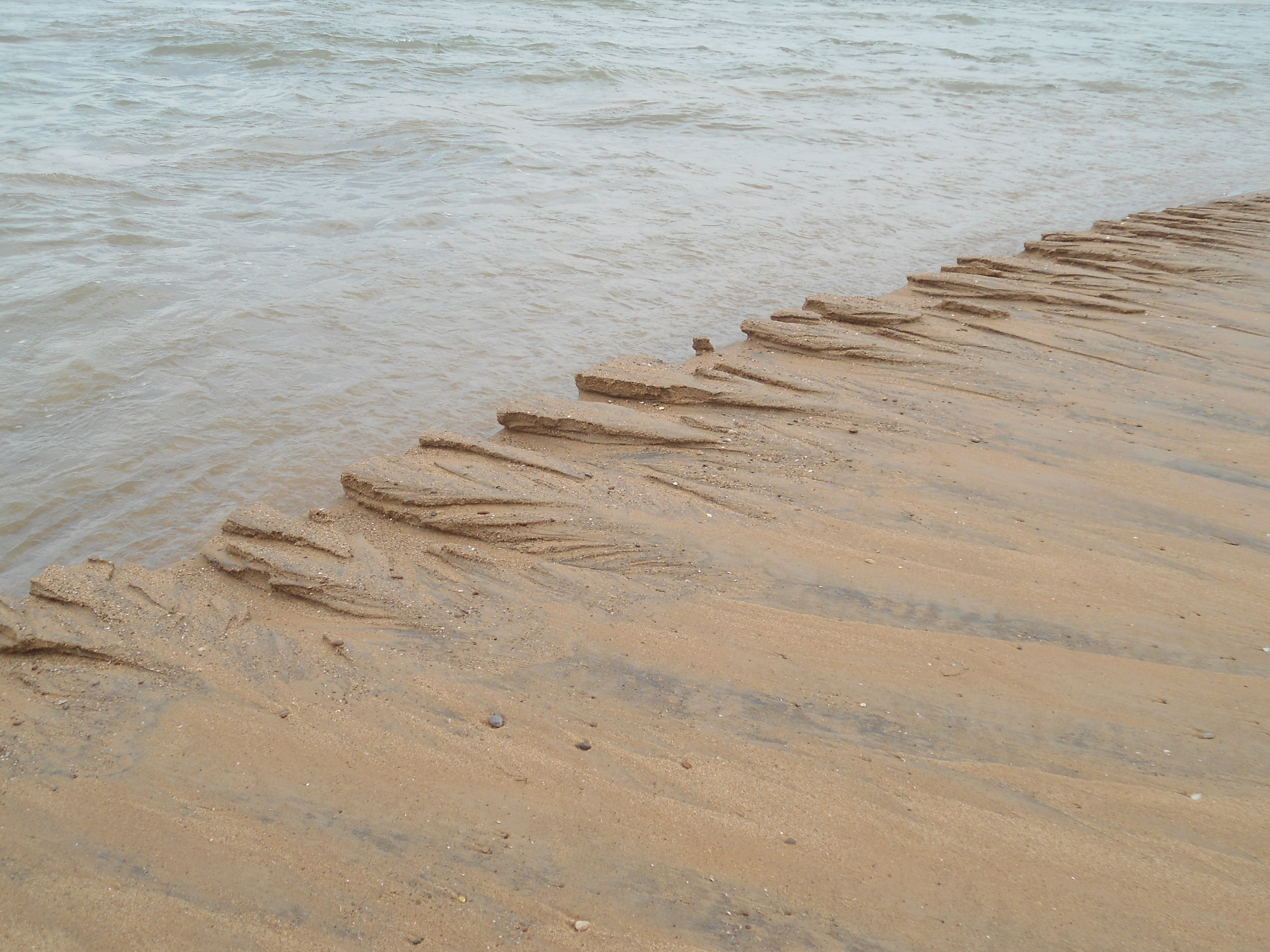
Erosion at Bheemunipatnam

See: List of beaches in Andhra Pradesh

Among the beaches present in the state, there are beaches in almost every district, with Visakhapatnam district having many. Rushikonda Beach is 8 km from the port city of Visakhapatnam. RK Beach, Lawson's Bay, Tenneti, Sagarnagar beaches etc., attracts many tourists to the city of Visakhapatnam. The beaches are a popular location to celebrate Holi. The beach of Bheemunipatnam has relics of the Dutch rulers with many dilapidated forts and monuments and has divine presence. It lies at the opening of the Gosthani River.

Uppada Beach, located 5 km from Kakinada has a wide and shallow beach. Vodarevu Beach is near Chirala town in Bapatla district. Nellore district, which is more famous for its port, has Krishnapatnam Beach and Mypadu Beach. Motupalle Beach is in Prakasam district.

Kalingapatnam Beach, which has a Buddhist Stupa and a light house, is located in Kalingapatnam of Srikakulam district and Baruva Beach in Srikakulam district an oldest beach in Andhra Pradesh . The State Government is promoting the development of this area as a tourist destination. The roads end in the bed of the sea shore and hence, the beach is also referred as the Open Road Sea.

Other beaches are Perupalem Beach (Narasapuram) in West Godavari district, Manginapudi Beach (Machilipatnam) in Krishna district, Suryalanka Beach in Bapatla district, Mypadu Beach, Koduru beach in Nellore district.and surasaniyanam beach in dr br ambedkar konaseema district (AMALAPURAM)uppalaguptam mandal.
