= Andhra Pradesh Randomized Evaluation Studies =

The Andhra Pradesh Randomized Evaluation Studies (APRESt) are a series of large-scale randomized evaluations aimed at understanding how to improve educational outcomes of students in rural India. APRESt is made up of three main projects: 1) Incentives & Inputs 2). AP School Choice and 3). School Health. Each project aims to rigorously evaluate education initiatives in India. The Azim Premji Foundation is the lead executor of each project in APRESt.

== Background ==
APRESt was initiated by Karthik Muralidharan, an assistant professor of economics at the University of California, San Diego and Venkatesh Sundararaman, a senior economist at the World Bank, in partnership with the Azim Premji Foundation and the Government of Andhra Pradesh. In 2004, APRESt began with the Incentives & Inputs study, which seeks to understand how to improve educational outcomes of students using performance pay and educational inputs such as providing extra teachers and grants for schools to purchase classroom materials. In 2007, APRESt expanded with the launch of a project about school choice, which seeks to understand how providing equal access to education affects learning outcomes. In the summer of 2009, APRESt initiated another project, which focuses on the impact of children’s health on test scores and attendance.

Each of the randomized evaluations of APRESt are large scale studies that cover thousands of students, schools, and households. Over the past five years of APRESt, almost 150,000 students have taken an exam designed by Educational Initiatives and administered by APRESt.

== Projects ==
Incentives & Inputs: This project aims to understand how performance pay and inputs into rural government schools impact the educational outcomes of students. Initially, the Incentives & Inputs study randomly selected 400 schools and provided one of the following to groups of 100 schools:

- Bonuses based on the gains of students' test scores of each teacher individually.
- Bonuses based on the gains of all students' test scores in the school.
- Provision of a contract teacher to assist teaching students in schools
- Provision of a block grant that allows the school to provide classroom materials for students.

Another 100 schools were selected as a control group. In these 100 control schools, the schools received none of the aforementioned treatments, but were administered the same exam as the treatment schools.

Several studies have been based on data collected from the Incentives & Inputs study including a recent paper on performance pay for teachers.

AP School Choice (APSC): The APSC project was implemented to understand the growing explosion of private schools in rural India. A paper by Karthik Muralidharan of University of California, San Diego and Michael Kremer of Harvard University shows that private schools in rural India appear to perform better than government schools across several measures. However, little rigorous evidence has been amassed to show whether private schools actually do improve the academic outcomes of students better than government schools. The APSC Project initiated a scholarship program to provide interested households the opportunity to send their child to the school of their choice. Since the scholarship program received more applicants than number of scholarship available, applicants were randomly allocated the scholarship. Over the course of five years, all students in the villages where the scholarship program took place will be administered a test each year to observe whether the private schools actually improve the test scores of students.

School Health: This project aims to investigate how improving the nutrition and health of students in rural India impacts academic outcomes. This project is currently being piloted and will be scaled up in early 2010.
