= Andhra Pradesh Vaidya Vidhana Parishad =

Government division in Andhra Pradesh, India

Agency overview
- Formed: 1 March 1987
- Jurisdiction: Government of Andhra Pradesh
- Headquarters: Amaravathi, Andhra Pradesh
- Minister responsible: Ministry of Health and Family Welfare
- Agency executive: Commissioner of Health & Family Welfare
- Website: http://apvvp.ap.nic.in/

Andhra Pradesh Vaidya Vidhana Parishad (APVVP) is one of the divisions of Health, Medical and Family Welfare Department of Andhra Pradesh Government, India. In 2014, CHC, AREA and District Hospitals in Telangana region came under Telangana State Vaidya Vidhana Parishad.

It was established by an act of legislation in 1986. It exclusively deals with the middle level hospitals of bed strengths ranging from 30 to 350. Primary Health Centres and Medical College Hospitals does not come under its jurisdiction.

There are 1,965 doctors, 4,219 nurses and 2,510 paramedical staff presently working under this organization.

There are 228 hospitals under its control in Andhra Pradesh with total bed strength of 15,208. They include 20 District Hospitals, 56 Area Hospitals, 117 Community Health Centres, 10 Speciality Hospitals and 25 Civil Dispensaries.

The District Hospital has ten service specialties i.e. General Medicine, General Surgery, Obstetrics and Gynecology, Pediatrics, Ophthalmology, Orthopedics, ENT, Dental, Radiology and Anesthesiology. It has 11 Civil Surgeon Specialists along with 18-20 Civil Assistant Surgeons. There are Paramedical staff members comprising 48 to 78 Staff Nurses, 3 Laboratory Technicians, 3 Radiographers and other staff. The district hospital have all the major equipments such as 500 mA X-ray unit, Ultrasound Scanner, Endoscopes, Boyle's Apparatus, ECG machine, Defibrillator and Cardiac Monitor.

The Area Hospital which is in general a 100-bed facility caters to four specialties i.e. General Medicine, General Surgery, Obstetrics and Gynecology and Pediatrics. There are 4 Civil Surgeon Specialists and 10-12 Civil Assistant Surgeons. There are 24 Staff Nurses, 3 Laboratory Technicians, 1 Radiographer and other technical staff and supportive medical staff. The Area Hospital have 300 mA X-ray units, Ultra Sound Scanner, Boyle's Apparatus, ECG machine and basic theatre equipment.

The Community Health Center provides only general services without involvement of any specialties. There is a provision for 4-5 Civil Assistant Surgeons and in many places one Deputy Civil Surgeon/Civil Surgeon. The equipment is more basic and comprises 60 mA X-ray along with basic surgical equipment.

District and Area hospitals are headed by Medical Superintendent with a rank of civil surgeon.
