= The Andhra Pradesh State Christian (Minorities) Finance Corporation =

The Andhra Pradesh State Christian (Minorities) Finance Corporation is a state agency of the Government of Andhra Pradesh. It was set up in 2008 with objective to assist the Christian community in their socio-economic development. It is funded by the Government of Andhra Pradesh. The Andhra Pradesh Government has appointed Shri Maddirala Joseph Emmanuel (Mannie) as the chairman of the Andhra Pradesh State Christian Minorities Finance Corporation on 8 January 2019.

== The schemes ==
- Christian mass marriages
- Pre Matric scholarships
- Post Matric scholarships
- Tuition fee reimbursement
- Merit-cum-means scholarships
- Training, employment and placement
- Free coaching for competitive examinations
- Subsidy for bank-linked income generation schemes
- Christian pilgrimage to Jerusalem
- Financial assistance for construction, renovation, and repairs to churches
- Financial assistance to Christian hospitals, schools, orphanages, old age homes, community halls-cum-youth and resource centers, and youth awareness programmes and promotion of Christian culture
