= Andhra Pradesh (magazine) =

Official Indian state magazine

Andhra Pradesh is an official monthly magazine brought by the Department of Information and Public Relations of Government of Andhra Pradesh. The magazine was started in 1952. It is published in English, Telugu and Urdu languages from Hyderabad. The magazine provides information regarding developmental activities undertaken by the Government of Andhra Pradesh. It also features interesting articles of personality development, humor, career counselling, entertainment, short stories and poetry. There is an online edition of the magazine.
