= List of adjectives and demonyms for states and territories of India =

Where an adjective is a link, the link is to the language or dialect of the same name. (Reference: Ethnologue, Languages of the World)

State or territory	Adjective	Demonym	
State or territory	Adjective		colloquial
Andaman and Nicobar Islands	Andamanese; Nicobarese	Andamanese; Nicobarese	
Andhra Pradesh	Andhrulu	Andhraites, Andhrites, Andhra Pradeshis, Andhrulu	Teluguvaaru
Arunachal Pradesh	Arunachali	Arunachalis	
Assam	Assamese	Assamese	
Bihar	Bihari	Biharis	
Chandigarh	Chandigarhi	Chandigarhis	
Chhattisgarh	Chhattisgarhi	Chhattisgarhis	
Dadra and Nagar Haveli and Daman and Diu	Dadran; Nagar Havelian; Damanese; Diuese	Dadran; Nagar Havelian; Damanese; Diuese	
Delhi	Delhiite, Delhian	Delhiites, Delhians	
Goa	Goan,	Goans, Goenkars	
Gujarat	Gujarati	Gujaratis	
Haryana	Haryanvi	Haryanvis	–
Himachal Pradesh	Himachali	Himachalis	
Jammu and Kashmir	Jammu; Kashmiri	Jammuite; Kashmiris	–
Jharkhand	Jharkhandi	Jharkhandis	
Karnataka	Karnatakan, Canarese	Karnatakans, Canarese, Kannadiga	Kannadiga
Kerala	Keralite	Keralites, Malayalis	Malayali
Ladakh	Ladakhi	Ladakhi	
Lakshadweep (Laccadives)	Laccadivian	Laccadivians	
Madhya Pradesh	Madhya Pradeshi	Madhya Pradeshis	
Maharashtra	Maharashtrian	Maharashtrians	Marathi
Manipur	Manipuri	Manipuris	Meiteis
Meghalaya	Meghalayan	Meghalayans	
Mizoram	Mizo	Mizos	
Nagaland	Naga, Nagalandese	Nagas, Nagalanders	
Odisha	Odia (Odia) [of the people] Odishan (Orissan) [of the state] Odissi (Orissi)	Odias (Odias); Odishans (Orissans)	–
Puducherry (formerly Pondicherry)	Pondicherrian	Pondicherrians	–
Punjab	Punjabi	Punjabis	
Rajasthan	Rajasthani	Rajasthanis	
Sikkim	Sikkimese	Sikkimese	
Tamil Nadu	Tamil, Tamilian	Tamils, Tamilians	Tamizhan
Telangana	Telanganite	Telanganites	Teluguvaaru
Tripura	Tripuri, Tripuran	Tripuris, Tripurans	
Uttar Pradesh	Uttar Pradeshi	Uttar Pradeshis	
Uttarakhand	Uttarakhandi	Uttarakhandis	
West Bengal	(West) Bengali, (West) Bengalese (archaic)	(West) Bengalis	
