= Ethnic groups in Andhra Pradesh =

Andhra Pradesh is a state in the southern part of India. It was created on 2 June 2014, with the passing of the Andhra Pradesh Reorganisation Act. Andhra Pradesh is bordered by the Bay of Bengal to the east, Karnataka to the west, Telangana to the north-west Odisha and Chhattisgarh are to the north and Tamil Nadu to the south. The state covers an area of 162,975 km2 (62,925 sq mi), or 5.83% of the total geographical area of India. It comprises 26 districts. Telugu is the primary official language of Andhra Pradesh and spoken as a native language by about 89.21% of the people. Other ethnic minorities in the state as of 2001 are Urdu people (6.55%), Tamil people (1.04%).

== Telugu people ==
The Telugu people form the dominant ethnic group in Andhra Pradesh, making up to 83.88% (as per 2001 census) of the total population of the state. They are the native speakers of the Telugu language. Telugu is one of the official languages of India and the official and administrative language of the state of Andhra Pradesh.

== Urdu ==
Urdu is spoken by 6.55% of the total population, majority of whom are Muslims. People who speak Urdu as their mother tongue mostly hail from the districts of Kurnool, Nandyal, Sri Sathya Sai district, Ananthapur, Prakasam districts of Andhra Pradesh, which were part of the erstwhile Hyderabad state.

== Tamil people ==
According to the 2001 census, speakers of Tamil language formed the third largest ethnic group in Andhra Pradesh (1.04% of the total population). The 2011 census indicates that there were 1113,848 Tamils living in Andhra Pradesh. The speakers of Tamil language form the native ethnic group of Tamil Nadu, the neighbouring state of Andhra Pradesh.

The taluk of Tirutani and Pallipattu sub-taluk of Chittoor district (large Tamil speaking community) of Andhra Pradesh were transferred to Madras State in exchange for territories from the Chingelput (Chengalpattu) and Salem Districts on 1 April 1961 as per the Andhra Pradesh and Madras Alteration of Boundaries Act 1959.

== Odia people ==
Speakers of Odia language make up 0.44% of the total population of Andhra Pradesh. They are concentrated in the districts of Srikakulam, Visakhapatnam and Vizianagaram.
