= Dhimsa =

Type of dance

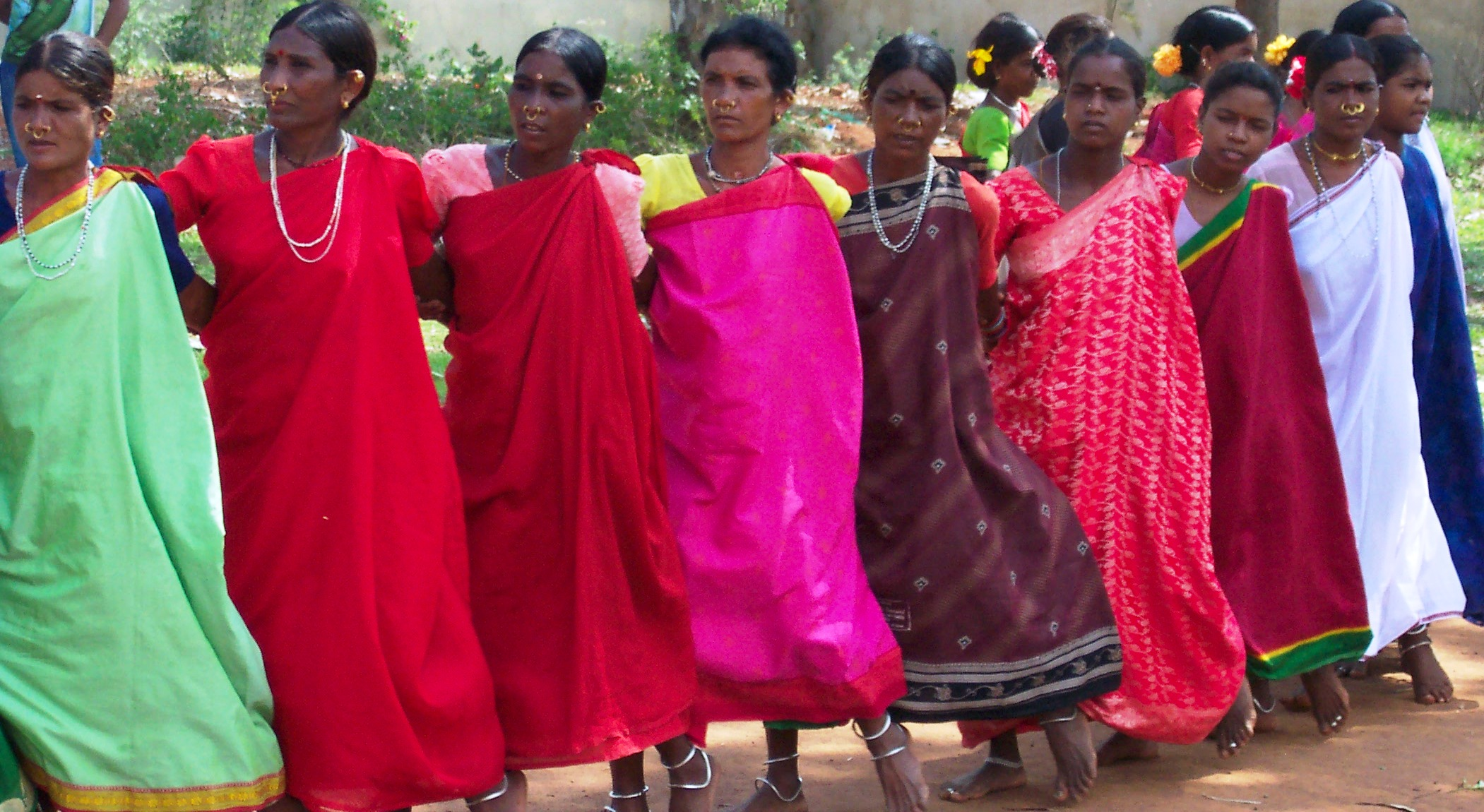
Tribal women participating in Dhimsa dance in the Araku Valley of Andhra Pradesh

Dhimsa is a tribal dance form that is performed primarily by people of Koraput, a town and a Municipality in Koraput district in the Indian state of Odisha.

== Origin ==
Dhimsa originated in Koraput district in the Odisha State. Dhimsa means "sound of the foot steps". Dhimsa is in the groove with the culture of this region, especially with places near Araku Valley and Borra Caves. Earlier unmarried youth used to dance. There is no discrimination as to who gets to join in the dance. It is generally played as a relief time during their working hours. Each dance movement resembles their daily activity like picking leaves or plants, farming activities, traditional culture during matrimonial alliances, protecting them from wildlife etc.

== Style of dance ==
This expressive dance is dominated by the movements of feet and hands of the group performing the dance in a circle. Though this dance can be performed by men and women, young and old, typically around 15-20 women form a chain and move their feet according to the rhythm and make formations of smaller to larger circles. There are several variations in this dance. The popular twelve variations are: 1) Bhag Dhimisa 2. Natikari Dhimsa 3. Kunda Dhimisa 4. Pathartola Dhimisa 5. Pedda Dhimisa 6. Sambor Nisani Dhimisa 7. Bayya Dhimisa 8. Mouli Dhimisa 8.Choti Dhimisa 9. Boda Dhimsa (Involves worship of their ritual goodness or god in villages.) 10. Goddi Beta Dimsa (Dancer moves both backward and forward with the swinging of body.)

== Instruments ==
The members play Dappu (drum with a short stick), Tudumu, Mori, Kiridi and Jodukommulu. The performers dance to the drum beats and usually the music is played by men.

== Costume ==
The attire is bright and colorful with earthy tones of green, red and yellow. The dancers wear sarees that fall just below the knee. Their necks are adorned with tribal ornaments.
