= Geography of Andhra Pradesh =

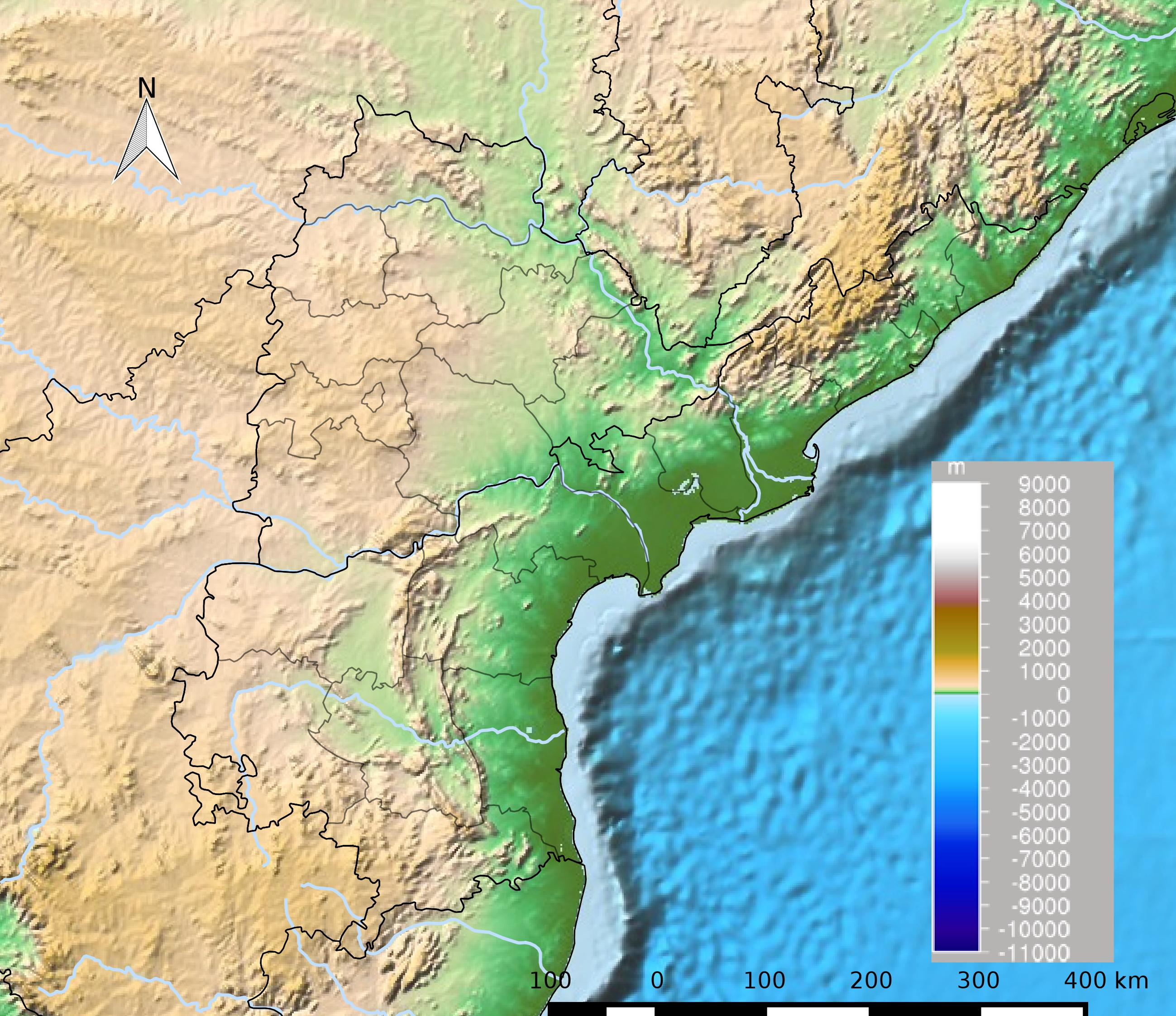
Topography of Andhra Pradesh and surrounding area

Andhra Pradesh lies between 12°41' and 19.07°N latitude and 77° and 84°40'E longitude, and is bordered by Telangana to the north and west, Chhattisgarh to the north-west, Odisha to the north, the Bay of Bengal to the east, Tamil Nadu to the south and Karnataka to the southwest and west. Andhra Pradesh has a coastline of around 974 km, which gives it the second longest coastline in the nation. Two major rivers, the Godavari and the Krishna run across the state. A small enclave 12 sq mi (30 km²), the Yanam district of Puducherry, lies in the Godavari Delta in the north east of the state. The state includes the eastern part of Deccan plateau as well as a considerable part of the Eastern Ghats.

Historically the region comprising the state was known as Andhraapatha, Andhradesa, Andhraavani, and Andhra vishaya.

== Climate ==
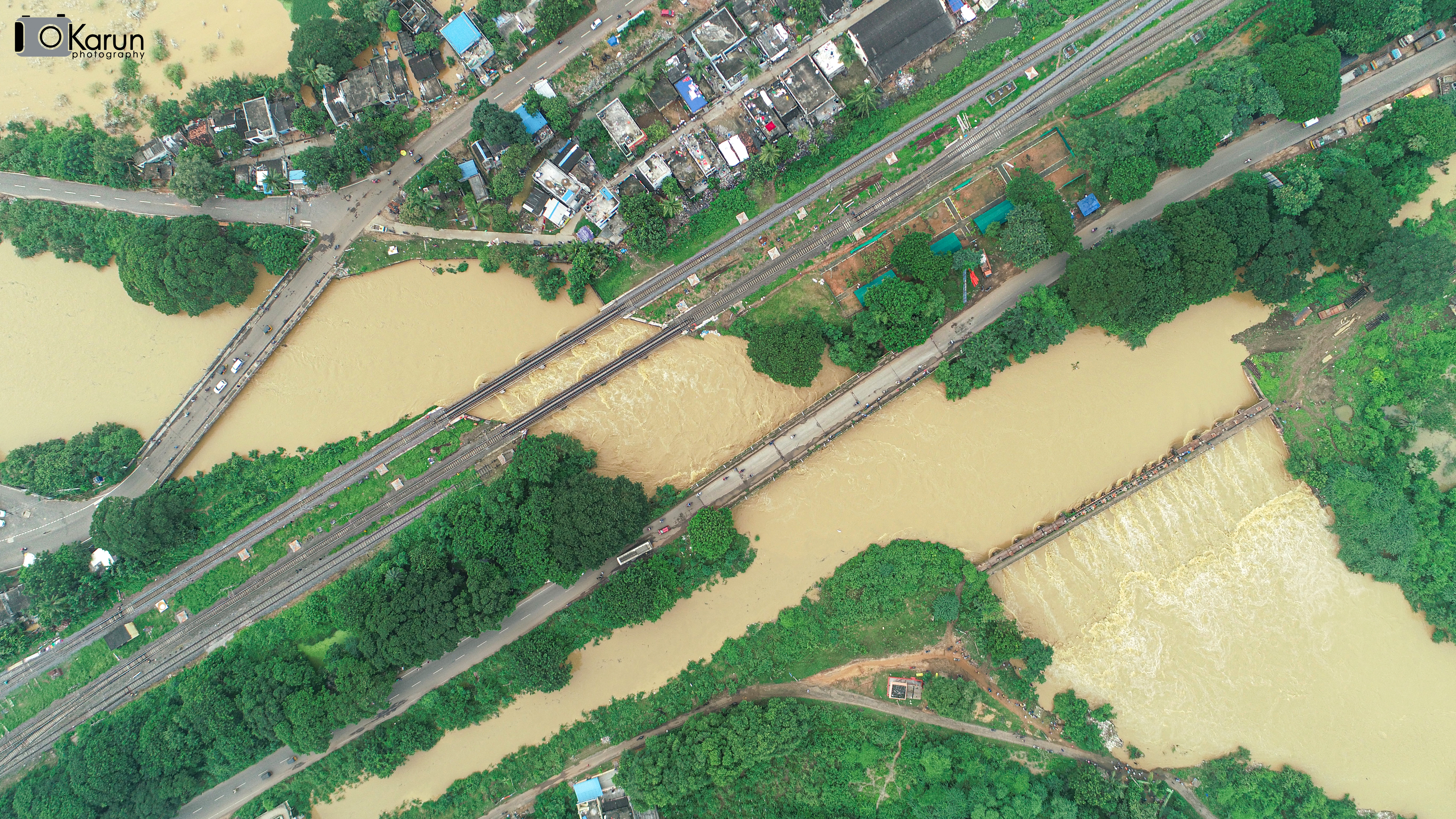
Tammileru river at Eluru flooded during 2020 North-East Monsoons

The climate of Andhra Pradesh is generally hot and humid in the lowland coastal regions, while it is mostly semi-arid in parts of Anantapur district, Sri Sathya Sai district, Kurnool district and Kadapa district. These areas fall under the rainshadow region of the Western Ghats. The summer season in this state generally extends from March to May or June. During these months the moisture level is relatively higher than in winters, and it is generally higher in the coastal lowlands.

The summer is followed by the monsoon season, which starts in May or June and continues till October. This is the season for heavy tropical rains in Andhra Pradesh. The major role in determining the climate of the state is played by southwest monsoon. About one third of the total rainfall in Andhra Pradesh is brought by the northeast monsoons around the month of October. The lowest rainfall occurs in Anantapur district, at 311 mm per year, while the highest occurs in Alluri Sitharama Raju district at 738 mm.

The winters in Andhra Pradesh are cooler, and this is when the state attracts most of its tourists. October to February are the winter months in Andhra Pradesh. Since the state has quite a long coastline, the winters are comparatively mild. The temperature in winter ranges from around 13 °C to 30 °C in coastal areas and from about 15 °C to 36 °C in the rainshadow. There is a long mountain pass in the Eastern Ghats between the dry deciduous forests of the Seshachalam hills as far north as the Nallamala Hills, spanning a distance of over 300 kilometres. The mountain pass consists of major towns, including Venkatagiri, Badvel, Porumamilla, Giddalur and Markapur. It is only about 15 kilometres wide, and divides the Deccan Plateau from the lowlands.

== Political geography ==
Map of the districts of Andhra Pradesh.

Andhra Pradesh is divided into three regions, namely Coastal Andhra, Uttarandhra and Rayalaseema.

Andhra Pradesh has 28 districts: Anantapur, Annamayya, Anakapalli, Alluri Sitharama Raju, Bapatla, Chittoor, East Godavari, Eluru, Guntur, NTR, Kakinada, Konaseema, Krishna, Kurnool, Markapuram, Nandyal, Sri Potti Sreeramulu Nellore, Palnadu,Parvathipuram Manyam, Polavaram, Prakasam, Srikakulam, Sri Sathya Sai, Tirupati, Visakhapatnam, Vizianagaram, West Godavari and Kadapa

Kadapa is the largest district of the state Andhra Pradesh with an area of 12,507 km^{2}.

Each district is divided into multiple mandals, and each mandal has many villages.

Visakhapatnam is the largest city in the state followed by Vijayawada, Guntur, Tirupati. Other important cities and towns are Kakinada, Rajahmundry, Nellore, Ongole, Kurnool,Kadapa,Proddatur and Eluru.

== See also ==
- List of Rivers in Andhra Pradesh
- Coastline of Andhra Pradesh
