= Fee Reimbursement Scheme =

Indian student education sponsorship programme

The Fee Reimbursement Scheme (also known as the Post-matric Scholarship Scheme) is a student education sponsorship programme of the Government of Andhra Pradesh. It supports students from lower economic strata in the state.

Congress Party made poll promise to provide college fees for underprivileged people. The fee reimbursement programme to all sections of people with 100% in private engineering colleges was brought by Congress Party Government on 2007.

In 2012–13, more than 600,000 students in professional colleges were covered under the scheme, including around 150,000 students in engineering colleges. From 2013 to 2014, the government made the possession of an Aadhaar card a mandatory requirement for fee reimbursement procedures for the beneficiaries.

In year 2008 R. Krishnaiah, president of BC Welfare Association, demanded the government to provide full 100% fee reimbursement to BC students as well inline with the SC/ST students. The government issued a committee on Krishniah's demands, but it did not approve the demands. R. Krishnaiah announced a fast if the demands were not fulfilled. Responding to this demands congress government, led by AP Government cissued GO.Ms.No 18 Dated 27 June 2008 to provide scholarship on saturation basis for BC Students as well. In July 2009, the proposal was made to introduce fees reimbursement for Economically Backward Class students and Ms No. 102 Higher Education Dept. dated 29 July 2009 was issued by the government which provided guidelines for implementation of the scheme. Later G.O.Ms.No. 2 BACKWARD CLASSES WELFARE (B2) was issued by congress government led by chief minister Konijeti Rosaiah transferring EBC scholarships to Backward Class Welfare Department and providing the administrative sanction for the Fees Reimbursement for EBC students. The government spent ₹ 2000 crores in 2008–09; this rose to ₹ 5000 crores in 2012–13. This was because only first years who took admit in the year 2008 got full fee reimbursement but later on the scheme was implemented to other years. Due to this increase in the budget allocation, the government decided to provide full fees reimbursement for only students who got rank below 10000 in EAMCET, and a maximum of Rs.35000 for ranks above 10000.

== Programmes covered ==
The scheme covers professional programmes, including Bachelor's in engineering, medicine, education, etc. and Master's in business administration, computer applications, etc.

== Controversies ==
The scheme has faced criticism due to the misuse of the policy by some institutions. The government reduced the scholarship amount to Rs.35,000 in 2013–14. After the separation of Telangana from Andhra Pradesh, the fee reimbursement became a bone of contention between the two states. The Telangana government introduced a new clause affecting the eligibility of around 39,000 Andhra-origin students who have completed their high school and college in Telangana.
