= Veeranatyam =

Type of dance

Veeranatyam or Dance of the brave (veera means brave; natyam means dance) is an ancient form of dance from the state of Andhra Pradesh, with associated religious significance.

Veeranatyam started as a ritual that was performed in Shiva (shaivite) temples in honour of Shiva. The followers of Veerabhadra are best known for performing this style of dance, in particular the Veeramusti community in the state of Andhra Pradesh.

Natyam or Veerabhadra Natyam is performed by men in East and West Godavari, Kurnool, Anantapur and Khammam.

The first stage is the holding of "Veerabhadra Pallem" a huge plate carried from the palms to the elbows bearing a camphor fire. The dance goes on vigorously to the tempo of several percussion instruments until the fire is extinguished. Part of this ceremony consists of the ‘Khadgalu’ recital, where a pujari brandishes a long sword representing that of Veerabhadra.

The second stage lies in holding a long consecrated pole, marked with Vibhuti (sacred ash) representing the ‘Dhwaja Sthamba’ of the Lord with bells tied to the top.

In the third stage the performers dance with spears and tridents pierced into their ankles, hands and tongue. This is called ‘Narasam’. The dancers are dressed in colorful knee-length dhotis secured by waist-sashes smeared with vibhuti all over their body. The main percussion instrument is the ‘Veeranam’ or ‘war-drum’.
