= 1994 Andhra Pradesh Legislative Assembly election =

- 1 December 1994

All 294 seats in the Andhra Pradesh Legislative Assembly 148 seats needed for a majority
- Registered: 44,725,091
- Turnout: 31,763,466 (71.02%) ▲0.58%
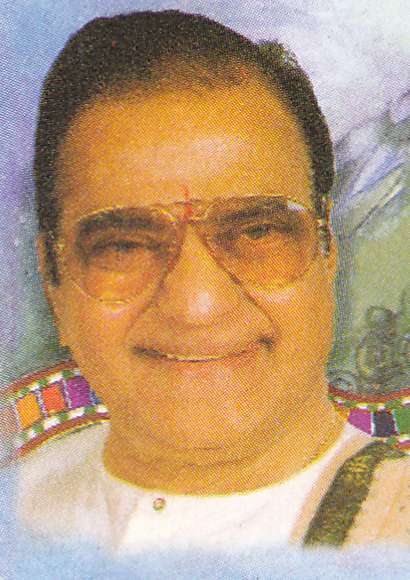

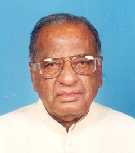
	Majority party	Minority party
Leader	N. T. Rama Rao	Kotla Vijaya Bhaskara Reddy
Party	TDP	INC(I)
Alliance	NF	-
Leader since	1982	1982
Leader's seat	Hindupur (won; retained), Tekkali (won; vacated)	Dhone (won)
Last election	74 seats, 36.54%	181 seats, 47.09%
Seats won	216	26
Seat change	▲142	▼155
Popular vote	13,743,842	10,540,182
Percentage	44.14%	33.85%
Swing	▲7.60%	▼13.24%
- 1994 Andhra Pradesh Legislative Assembly election results
Chief minister before election
Kotla Vijaya Bhaskara Reddy
INC(I)
Chief minister after election
N. T. Rama Rao
TDP

The 1994 Andhra Pradesh Legislative Assembly election took place in December 1994 in 294 constituencies in Andhra Pradesh, India. The elections were conducted to elect the government in the state of Andhra Pradesh for the next five years. The TDP secured a huge majority winning 216 seats. The Indian National Congress won only 26 seats. NTR was sworn his 3rd term as Chief Minister of the state.

In Andhra Pradesh, the Sasana Sabha, or Legislative Assembly, has 294 constituencies. 39 constituencies are reserved for the Scheduled Castes candidates and 15 constituencies are reserved for the Scheduled tribes candidates.

== Parties and alliances ==
Alliance/Party		Flag	Symbol	Leader	Seats contested	
National Front	Telugu Desam Party			N. T. Rama Rao	251	289
National Front	Communist Party of India			Chilumula Vittal Reddy (Note: this is the Floor Leader of the party)	21	289
National Front	Communist Party of India (Marxist)			Narra Raghava Reddy	16	289
National Front	Janata Dal			V. P. Singh	1	289
Indian National Congress				Majji Tulasi Das	294	
Bharatiya Janata Party				V. Rama Rao	280	
Majlis Bachao Tehreek				Amanullah Khan	9	
All India Majlis-e-Ittehadul Muslimeen				Sultan Salahuddin Owaisi	20	

== List of Candidates ==
District	Constituency		TDP+		INC	
District	#	Name	Party	Candidate	Party	Candidate
Srikakulam	1	Ichapuram	TDP	Dakkata Achuta Ramayya	INC	Trinadha Reddy Buddhala
Srikakulam	2	Sompeta	TDP	Goutu Syama Sundara	INC	Majji Sarada
Srikakulam	3	Tekkali	TDP	N. T. Rama Rao	INC	Babu Rao Vajja
Srikakulam	4	Harishchandra	TDP	K. Yerran Naidu	INC	Raghavarao Sampathirao
Srikakulam	5	Narasannapeta	TDP	Baggu Lakshmanarao	INC	Dharmana Prasada Rao
Srikakulam	6	Patapatnam	TDP	Kalamata Mohan Rao	INC	Dharmana Narayana Rao
Srikakulam	7	Kothuru (ST)	TDP	Nimmaka Gopala Rao	INC	Viswasarai Narasimharao
Vizianagaram	8	Naguru (ST)	TDP	Nimmaka Jaya Raju	INC	S. Chandra Sekhara Raju
Vizianagaram	9	Parvathipuram	TDP	Yarra Krishna Murty	INC	Mariserla Sivunnaidu
Vizianagaram	10	Salur (ST)	TDP	Rajendra Pratap Deo	INC	Vikrama Chandra Sanyasi
Vizianagaram	11	Bobbili	TDP	S. V. Ch. Appalanaidu	INC	P. Jagan Mohan Rao
Vizianagaram	12	Therlam	TDP	Tentu Jayaprakash	INC	V. Varada Rama Rao
Srikakulam	13	Vunukuru	TDP	Kimidi Kalavenkata Rao	INC	Palavalasa Rajasekharam
Srikakulam	14	Palakonda (SC)	TDP	Bhyadrayya Tale	INC	P. J. Amruthakumari
Srikakulam	15	Amadalavalasa	TDP	Thammineni Seetharam	INC	Chittibabu Boddepalli
Srikakulam	16	Srikakulam	TDP	G. Appalasuryanarayana	INC	A. Varaha Narasimham
Srikakulam	17	Etcherla (SC)	TDP	K. Prathibha Bharathi	INC	Jampu Latchayya
Vizianagaram	18	Cheepurupalli	TDP	Gadde Babu Rao	INC	Kemburi Ramamohan Rao
Vizianagaram	19	Gajapathinagaram	TDP	Padala Aruna	INC	Taddi Sanyasi Naidu
Vizianagaram	20	Vizianagaram	TDP	Ashok Gajapathi Raju	INC	K. Veerabhadra Swamy
Vizianagaram	21	Sathivada	TDP	Surya Narayana Potnuru	INC	P. Sambasiva Raju
Vizianagaram	22	Bhogapuram	TDP	Pathivada N. Naidu	INC	Kommuru Sanjeevarao
Visakhapatnam	23	Bheemunipatnam	TDP	R. S. D. P. A. N. Raju	INC	Korada Sankar Rao
Visakhapatnam	24	Visakhapatnam-I	TDP	Sheku Abdul Rehman	INC	G. Gurunadha Rao
Visakhapatnam	25	Visakhapatnam-II	TDP	Palla Simhachalam	INC	Mariyadas Yandrapu
Visakhapatnam	26	Pendurthi	CPI	M. Anjaneyulu	INC	Dronamraju Sreenivasarao
Vizianagaram	27	Uttarapalli	TDP	Appalanaidu Kolla	INC	Kalavathi Boddu
Vizianagaram	28	Srungavarapukota (ST)	TDP	Dukku Labudu Bariki	INC	Gangadhara Swamy Setti
Visakhapatnam	29	Paderu (ST)	TDP	Kottagulli Chitti Naidu	INC	Balaraju Matsyarasa
Visakhapatnam	30	Madugula	TDP	Reddi Satyanarayana	INC	Kilaparti Suri Apparao
Visakhapatnam	31	Chodavaram	TDP	Gunuru Yerrunaidu	INC	Balireddi Satyarao
Visakhapatnam	32	Anakapalli	TDP	Dadi Veerabhadrarao	INC	Venkata Jaggarao Peela
Visakhapatnam	33	Paravada	TDP	Bandaru S. Murthy	INC	Eati Vijayalaxmi
Visakhapatnam	34	Elamanchili	TDP	Pappala Chalapathirao	INC	Nagireddi Prabhakararao
Visakhapatnam	35	Payakaraopeta (SC)	TDP	Kakara Nookaraju	INC	Gantela Sumana
Visakhapatnam	36	Narsipatnam	TDP	C. Ayyanna Patrudu	INC	Krishnamurty Sagi
Visakhapatnam	37	Chintapalli (ST)	CPI	Demudu Goddeti	INC	Balaraju Pasupuleti
East Godavari	38	Yellavaram (ST)	TDP	Seetam Setti Venkateswara	INC	T. Ratna Bai
East Godavari	39	Burugupudi	TDP	Venkata Ramakrishna	INC	N. Rama Chandrarao
East Godavari	40	Rajahmundry	TDP	G. B. Chowdary	INC	Vundavalli Aruna Kumar
East Godavari	41	Kadiam	TDP	Dadi Veerabhadra Rao	INC	J. Rammohan Rao
East Godavari	42	Jaggampeta	TDP	Jyothula Nehru	INC	Thota Venkatachalam
East Godavari	43	Peddapuram	TDP	Boddu Bhaskara Ramarao	INC	Pantham Padmanabham
East Godavari	44	Prathipadu	TDP	Parvatha Subbarao	INC	M. Padmanabham
East Godavari	45	Tuni	TDP	Y. Rama Krishnudu	INC	Maddala Chalapathi Rao
East Godavari	46	Pithapuram	TDP	Venna Nageswararao	INC	Sangisetti Veerabhadra Rao
East Godavari	47	Sampara	TDP	T. Satyalinga Naicker	INC	Pantam Gandhi Mohan
East Godavari	48	Kakinada	TDP	Mootha Gopala Krishna	INC	Malladi Swamy
East Godavari	49	Tallarevu	TDP	Chikkala Ramachandra Rao	INC	Dommeti Venkateswarulu
East Godavari	50	Anaparthy	TDP	Nallamilli Moola Reddy	INC	Tetali Ramareddy
East Godavari	51	Ramachandrapuram	TDP	G. Suryanarayana Babu	INC	P. Subhash Bose
East Godavari	52	Alamuru	TDP	V. V. S. S. Chowdary	INC	Venkatareddy Sangita
East Godavari	53	Mummidivaram (SC)	TDP	Moka Anand Sagar	INC	Bathina Subbarao
East Godavari	54	Allavaram (SC)	TDP	A. Jogeswara Venkata	INC	P. Veera Raghavulu
East Godavari	55	Amalapuram	TDP	Metla Satyanarayana	INC	Kudupudi Prabhakararao
East Godavari	56	Kothapeta	TDP	Bandaru Satyananda	INC	Chirla Somasundarareddy
East Godavari	57	Nagaram (SC)	TDP	Undru Krishna Rao	INC	Neethipudi Ganapathi Rao
East Godavari	58	Razole	TDP	Alluru Suryanarayana	INC	Gangayya Mangena
West Godavari	59	Narasapur	TDP	K. Subbarayudu	INC	Prabhakar Parakala
West Godavari	60	Palacole	TDP	Allu Venkata	INC	Ch. V. Hararamajogaiah
West Godavari	61	Achanta (SC)	CPI(M)	Digupati Rajagopal	INC	Bunga Saradhi
West Godavari	62	Bhimavaram	TDP	P. Venkata Narasimha	INC	B. Kamala Kanta Kasturi
West Godavari	63	Undi	TDP	Kalidindi R. C. Raju	INC	Katari Prabhakara Rao
West Godavari	64	Penugonda	CPI	Satyanarayana Vanka	INC	Pithani Satyanarayana
West Godavari	65	Tanuku	TDP	Mullapudi Venkata Krishnarao	INC	Ch. Achutharama Prasad
West Godavari	66	Attili	TDP	Dandu Sivaramaraju	INC	Kanumuru Bapiraju
West Godavari	67	Tadepalligudem	TDP	P. Kanaka Sundararao	INC	Satyanarayana Kottu
West Godavari	68	Ungutur	TDP	Kondreddi Viswanatham	INC	Chava Ramakrishnarao
West Godavari	69	Dendulur	TDP	Garapati Sambasiva Rao	INC	Pathuri John Paul
West Godavari	70	Eluru	TDP	Maradani Rangarao	INC	Maganti Varalaxmi Devi
West Godavari	71	Gopalpuram (SC)	TDP	Babajirao Jonnakuti	INC	Vivekananda Karupati
West Godavari	72	Kovvur	TDP	P. Venkata Rao	INC	G. S. Rao
West Godavari	73	Polavaram (ST)	TDP	Singanna Dora Punem	INC	Badisa Durgarao
West Godavari	74	Chintalapudi	TDP	Vidyadhararao Kotagiri	INC	Mandalapu Satyanarayana
Krishna	75	Jaggayyapeta	TDP	Nettem Raghuram	INC	Mukkapati Venkateswara Rao
Krishna	76	Nandigama	TDP	Devineni Venkata Ramana	INC	Sree Gopala Krishna
Krishna	77	Vijayawada West	CPI	Kakarlapudi Subba Raju	INC	Baig M.K.
Krishna	78	Vijayawada East	TDP	B. S. Jayaraju	INC	Vangaveeti Ratna Kumari
Krishna	79	Kankipadu	TDP	Devineni Nehru	INC	Nageswara Rao Yalamachili
Krishna	80	Mylavaram	TDP	J. Ramesh Babu	INC	Ch. Venkatarao
Krishna	81	Tiruvuru (SC)	TDP	Swamydas Nallagatla	INC	Koneru Ranga Rao
Krishna	82	Nuzvid	TDP	Kotagiri Hanumantha Rao	INC	Venkatrao Paladugu
Krishna	83	Gannavaram	TDP	D. Venkata Balavardhana	INC	Ratna Bose Musunuru
Krishna	84	Vuyyur	TDP	Anne Babu Rao	INC	V. Sobhana Chalapati Rao
Krishna	85	Gudivada	TDP	Ravi Sobhanadri Chowdary	INC	Eswar Kumar Katari
Krishna	86	Mudinepalli	TDP	Sitadevi Yerneni	INC	Pinnamaneni V. Rao
Krishna	87	Kaikalur	TDP	Raja Ramchandra Yerneni	INC	Namburu Venkata Raju
Krishna	88	Malleswaram	TDP	Kagita Venkatarao	INC	Buragadda Vedavyas
Krishna	89	Bandar	TDP	Ambati Brahmanaiah	INC	Perni Krishna Murthy
Krishna	90	Nidumolu (SC)	CPI(M)	Paturu Ramaiah	INC	Koppula Pothu Raju
Krishna	91	Avanigadda	TDP	Simhadri S. Rao	INC	Mandali Budha Prasad
Guntur	92	Kuchinapudi	TDP	Seetharamamma Evuru	INC	M. Venkata Rao
Guntur	93	Repalle	TDP	M. Venkata Subbaiah	INC	Ambati Rambabu
Guntur	94	Vemur	TDP	Rajendraprasad Alapati	INC	Alapati Dharmarao
Guntur	95	Duggirala	TDP	Kotaru Koteswara Rao	INC	Gudibandi Venkatareddy
Guntur	96	Tenali	TDP	Ravi Ravindranadh	INC	Nadendla Bhaskararao
Guntur	97	Ponnur	TDP	Narendrakumar Dhulipalla	INC	T. Venkata Ramaiah
Guntur	98	Bapatla	TDP	Muppalaneni Seshagiri Rao	INC	Chukka Peter Paul
Guntur	99	Prathipad	TDP	Makineni Peda Rathaiah	INC	Hanumaiah Chebrolu
Guntur	100	Guntur-I	TDP	Zia Uddin Sm	INC	Mohammad Jani
Guntur	101	Guntur-II	TDP	Challa Venkata Reddy	INC	Jayarambabu Chadalavada
Guntur	102	Mangalagiri	CPI(M)	N. Rama Mohan Rao	INC	Damarla Uma Maheswara
Guntur	103	Tadikonda (SC)	CPI	G.M.N.V. Prasad	INC	T. Venkaiah
Guntur	104	Sattenapalli	CPI(M)	Puthumbaka Bharathi	INC	Rayapati Srinivas
Guntur	105	Peddakurapadu	TDP	Sambasiva Reddy Venna	INC	Kanna Lakshmi Narayana
Guntur	106	Gurzala	TDP	Y. Srinivasa Rao	INC	Kanakam Ramesh Chandra
Guntur	107	Macherla	TDP	Punna Reddy Kurri	INC	Sundararamireddy Pinnelli
Guntur	108	Vinukonda	Did not contest		INC	N. Rajakumari
Guntur	109	Narasaraopet	TDP	Kodela Sivaprasada Rao	INC	Balakotireddy Dodda
Guntur	110	Chilakaluripet	TDP	M. Venkata Narasimha	INC	Sambaiah Somepalli
Prakasam	111	Chirala	TDP	Paleti Rama Rao	INC	K. Rosaiah
Prakasam	112	Parchur	TDP	Battula Brahmananda	INC	Gade Venkata Reddy
Prakasam	113	Martur	Did not contest		INC	K. Balaram Murthy
Prakasam	114	Addanki	TDP	Anjaneyulu Ravi	INC	Raghavarao Jagarlamudi
Prakasam	115	Ongole	TDP	Edara Hari Babu	INC	Venkateswarlu Yedlapudi
Prakasam	116	Santhanuthalapadu (SC)	CPI(M)	Chenchaiah Thavanam	INC	Gurrala Venkata Seshu
Prakasam	117	Kandukur	TDP	Dr. Divi Sivaram	INC	Bhattarusetty Kondaiah
Prakasam	118	Kanigiri	TDP	Muku Kasi Reddy	INC	Trigineni Thirapathi Naidu
Prakasam	119	Kondepi	TDP	Damacharla Anjaneyulu	INC	Achyutakumar Gundapaneni
Prakasam	120	Cumbum	TDP	Chappidi Vengaiah	INC	Kandula Nagarjuna Reddy
Prakasam	121	Darsi	TDP	Narapasetty Sreeramulu	INC	Mohammed Ghouse Shaik
Prakasam	122	Markapur	CPI	Ande Nasaraia	INC	Kunduru Pedda Konda Reddy
Prakasam	123	Giddalur	TDP	P. Ramabhupala Reddy	INC	Yalluri Venkata Reddy
Nellore	124	Udayagiri	Did not contest		INC	Janakiram Madala
Nellore	125	Kavali	TDP	Vanteru Venugopala Reddy	INC	Kaliki Yanadi Reddy
Nellore	126	Allur	CPI(M)	Jakka Venkaiah	INC	K. Vishnuvardhan Reddy
Nellore	127	Kovur	TDP	N. Prasanna Kumar Reddy	INC	Chevuru Deva Reddy
Nellore	128	Atmakur	TDP	Kommi Lakshmaiah Naidu	INC	B. Sundararami Reddy
Nellore	129	Rapur	TDP	Y. Sreenivasulu Reddy	INC	A. Ramnarayana Reddy
Nellore	130	Nellore	TDP	T. Ramesh Reddy	INC	P. V. Prasanna Reddy
Nellore	131	Sarvepalli	TDP	Somireddy Chandra Mohan	INC	C. V. Seshareddy
Nellore	132	Gudur (SC)	TDP	Balli Durga Prasad Rao	INC	Patra Prakasa Rao
Nellore	133	Sulurpet (SC)	TDP	Parasa Venkata Ratnaiah	INC	Pasala Penchalaiah
Nellore	134	Venkatagiri	TDP	Yachendra Velugoti	INC	N. Janardhana Reddy
Chittoor	135	Sri Kalahasti	TDP	B. Gopala Reddy	INC	Chadalavada Krishnamoorthy
Chittoor	136	Satyavedu (SC)	TDP	Emsurajan	INC	Kalathuru Narayanaswamy
Chittoor	137	Nagari	TDP	V. Doraswamy Raju	INC	R. Chenga Reddy
Chittoor	138	Puttur	TDP	G. M. K. Naidu	INC	Reddyvari Rajesekara Reddy
Chittoor	139	Vepanjeri (SC)	TDP	R. Gandhi	INC	Netalam Sobha
Chittoor	140	Chittoor	TDP	A. S. Manohar	INC	C. K. Jayachandra Reddy
Chittoor	141	Palmaner (SC)	TDP	Patnam Subbaiah	INC	M. Thippeswamy
Chittoor	142	Kuppam	TDP	N. Chandrababu Naidu	INC	R. Gopinath
Chittoor	143	Punganur	TDP	N. Ramakrishna Reddy	INC	B. A. R. Mohammad Ali
Chittoor	144	Madanpalle	TDP	Ratakonda Krishna Sagar	INC	Alluri Subramanyam
Chittoor	145	Thamballapalle	TDP	A. Venkatalakshmi Devamma	INC	Kadapa Prabhakara Reddy
Chittoor	146	Vayalpad	TDP	Chinthala R. Reddy	INC	Kiran Kumar Reddy
Chittoor	147	Pileru	TDP	G. V. Sreenatha Reddy	INC	Peddireddy R. Reddy
Chittoor	148	Chandragiri	TDP	Nara Ramamurthy Naidu	INC	Galla Aruna Kumari
Chittoor	149	Tirupathi	TDP	A. Mohan	INC	Mabbu Rami Reddy
Kadapa	150	Kodur (SC)	TDP	Vaddi Chennaiah	INC	Kotapati Dhanunjaya
Kadapa	151	Rajampet	TDP	Pasupuleti Brahmaiah	INC	Kasireddi Madan Mohan
Kadapa	152	Rayachoty	TDP	S. Palakondrayudu	INC	M. Narayana Reddy
Kadapa	153	Lakkireddipalli	TDP	G. Dwarakanadha Reddy	INC	R. Rajagopal Reddy
Kadapa	154	Cuddapah	TDP	S. A. Kaleel Basha	INC	Kandula Sivananda Reddy
Kadapa	155	Badvel	TDP	B. Veera Reddy	INC	V. Siva Rama Krishna
Kadapa	156	Mydukur	TDP	S. Raghurami Reddy	INC	D. L. Ravindra Reddy
Kadapa	157	Proddatur	TDP	Kovvuru Ramasubbareddy	INC	N. Varada Rajulu Reddy
Kadapa	158	Jammalamadugu	TDP	P. Ramasubba Reddy	INC	C. Narayana Reddy
Kadapa	159	Kamalapuram	TDP	Gandluru Veera Siva Reddy	INC	M. V. Mysura Reddy
Kadapa	160	Pulivendla	TDP	Sirigireddy Ramamuni Reddy	INC	Y. S. Vivekananda Reddy
Anantapur	161	Kadiri	TDP	Suryanarayana	INC	Mohammad Shakeer
Anantapur	162	Nallamada	TDP	T. D. Nagaraja Reddy	INC	Agisam Veerappa
Anantapur	163	Gorantla	TDP	N. Kristappa	INC	L. Ramana Reddy
Anantapur	164	Hindupur	TDP	N. T. Rama Rao	INC	J. C. Prabhakar Reddy
Anantapur	165	Madakasira	TDP	Y. T. Prabhakara Reddy	INC	N. Raghuveera Reddy
Anantapur	166	Penukonda	TDP	Paritala Ravindra	INC	Sane Venkata Ramana Reddy
Anantapur	167	Kalyandrug (SC)	TDP	B. C. Govindappa	INC	M. Lakshmidevi
Anantapur	168	Rayadrug	TDP	Bandi Hulikuntappa	INC	Patil Venugopala Reddy
Anantapur	169	Uravakonda	TDP	Payyavula Keshav	INC	Pullaiah
Anantapur	170	Gooty	TDP	Gadhi Lingappa	INC	Arikera Jagadeesh
Anantapur	171	Singanamala (SC)	TDP	K. Jayaram	INC	P. Samanthakamani
Anantapur	172	Anantapur	CPI	K. Ramakrishna	INC	B. Narayana Reddy
Anantapur	173	Dharmavaram	TDP	Guta Venkata Naidu	INC	P. Govinda Chowdary
Anantapur	174	Tadpatri	TDP	Peram Nagi Reddy	INC	J. C. Diwakara Reddy
Kurnool	175	Alur (SC)	TDP	Masala Eranna	INC	Moolinti Mareppa
Kurnool	176	Adoni	TDP	K. Minakshi Naidu	INC	Raichooti Ramaiah
Kurnool	177	Yemmiganur	TDP	B. V. Mohan Reddy	INC	K. Kesava Reddy
Kurnool	178	Kodumur (SC)	TDP	Bangi Ananthaiah	INC	M. Sikhamani
Kurnool	179	Kurnool	CPI(M)	M. Abdul Gafoor	INC	K. E. Krishna Murthy
Kurnool	180	Pattikonda	TDP	S. V. Subba Reddy	INC	Patil Seshi Reddy
Kurnool	181	Dhone	CPI	Sudhakara Reddy	INC	K. V. Bhaskara Reddy
Kurnool	182	Koilkuntla	TDP	Karra Subba Reddy	INC	Challa Ramakrishna Reddy
Kurnool	183	Allagadda	TDP	Bhuma Nagi Reddy	INC	G. Prathap Reddy
Kurnool	184	Panyam	TDP	K. Chandra Sekhara Reddy	INC	K. Rambhupal Reddy
Kurnool	185	Nandikotkur	TDP	B. Rajasekhar Reddy	INC	M. Gidda Reddy
Kurnool	186	Nandyal	TDP	N. M. D. Farooq	INC	K. Maqbool Hussain
Kurnool	187	Atmakur	TDP	Budda Vengala Reddy	INC	Erasu Pratapa Reddy
Mahabubnagar	188	Achampet (SC)	TDP	Pothuganti Ramulu	INC	Devarapaga Kirankumar
Mahabubnagar	189	Nagarkurnool	TDP	Nagam Janardhan Reddy	INC	Mohan Goud Vanga
Mahabubnagar	190	Kalwakurthi	Did not contest		INC	J. Chittaranjan Das
Mahabubnagar	191	Shadnagar (SC)	TDP	Bakkani Narasimhulu	INC	P. Shanker Rao
Mahabubnagar	192	Jadcherla	TDP	Satyanarayana	INC	Pedda Narasappa
Mahabubnagar	193	Mahbubnagar	TDP	Chandra Sekar	INC	Puli Veeranna
Mahabubnagar	194	Wanaparthy	TDP	Chandra Sheker Reddy	INC	G. Chinna Reddy
Mahabubnagar	195	Kollapur	TDP	Katikeneni M. S. Rao	INC	Kotha Ramchander Rao
Mahabubnagar	196	Alampur	TDP	Kothakota Prakasha Reddy	INC	D. Vishnuvardhan Reddy
Mahabubnagar	197	Gadwal	Did not contest		INC	D. K. Samarasimha Reddy
Mahabubnagar	198	Amarchinta	TDP	Dayakaru Reddy	INC	Md. Obedulla Kothwal
Mahabubnagar	199	Makthal	TDP	Yella Reddy	INC	Chittam Narsi Reddy
Mahabubnagar	200	Kodangal	TDP	Nandaram Venkataiah	INC	Gurunath Reddy
Ranga Reddy	201	Tandur	TDP	P. Mahender Reddy	INC	M. Narayana Rao
Ranga Reddy	202	Vikarabad (SC)	TDP	A. Chandrasekhar	INC	V. B. Tirumalaiah
Ranga Reddy	203	Pargi	TDP	Koppula Harishwar Reddy	INC	Kamatam Ram Reddy
Ranga Reddy	204	Chevella	TDP	Indra Reddy Patlolla	INC	P. Pandu
Ranga Reddy	205	Ibrahimpatnam (SC)	CPI(M)	Kondigari Ramulu	INC	K. Satyanarayana
Hyderabad	206	Musheerabad	JD	N. Narsimha Reddy	INC	M. Kodanda Reddy
Hyderabad	207	Himayatnagar	TDP	C. Krishna Yadav	INC	B. Damodar
Hyderabad	208	Sanathnagar	TDP	Sripati Rajeshwar	INC	M. Shashidhar Reddy
Hyderabad	209	Secunderabad	TDP	Talasani Srinivas Yadav	INC	Mary Ravindranath
Hyderabad	210	Khairatabad	TDP	B. Vijaya Kumar	INC	P. Janardhana Reddy
Hyderabad	211	Secunderabad Cant. (SC)	TDP	G. Sayanna	INC	D. Narsing Rao
Hyderabad	212	Malakpet	TDP	M. Ranga Reddy	INC	P. Sudheer Kumar
Hyderabad	213	Asafnagar	TDP	Jaffer Javeed	INC	Danam Nagender
Hyderabad	214	Maharajgunj	TDP	Prem Singh Rathore	INC	K. Keshava Rao
Hyderabad	215	Karwan	TDP	M. Rajender	INC	Mir Iqbal Ali
Hyderabad	216	Yakutpura	TDP	Mohd. Ab. Salam Sharfan	INC	Sultana Jahan Begum
Hyderabad	217	Chandrayangutta	TDP	A. Bharath Prakash	INC	S. Pandu Ranga Rao
Hyderabad	218	Charminar	TDP	P. Babu Rao	INC	Syed Yousuf Hashmi
Ranga Reddy	219	Medchal	TDP	Devender Goud	INC	Singireddy Uma Devi
Medak	220	Siddipet	TDP	K. Chandrashekar Rao	INC	A. Madan Mohan
Medak	221	Dommat	TDP	Cheruku Muthyam Reddy	INC	Ahmed Farook Hussain
Medak	222	Gajwel (SC)	TDP	G. Vijaya Rama Rao	INC	Jetty Geetha
Medak	223	Narsapur	CPI	Chilumula Vittal Reddy	INC	Chavoti Jagannathrao
Medak	224	Sangareddy	TDP	K. Sadasiva Reddy	INC	P. Ramachandra Reddy
Medak	225	Zahirabad	TDP	C. Baganna	INC	P. Narsimha Reddy
Medak	226	Narayankhed	TDP	M. Vijaya Pal Reddy	INC	Shetkar Suresh Kumar
Medak	227	Medak	TDP	Karnam Ramchandra Rao	INC	P. Narayan Reddy
Medak	228	Ramayampet	TDP	Devra Vasudeva Rao	INC	Gari Vittal Anthi
Medak	229	Andole (SC)	TDP	Malyala Rajaiah	INC	Damodar Raja Narasimha
Nizamabad	230	Balkonda	TDP	Baddam Narsimha Reddy	INC	K. R. Suresh Reddy
Nizamabad	231	Armoor	TDP	Aleti Annapurna Devi	INC	Sanigaram Santosh Reddy
Nizamabad	232	Kamareddy	TDP	Gampa Govardhan	INC	Mohd. Ali Shabbir
Nizamabad	233	Yellareddy	TDP	Nerella Anjaneyulu	INC	Tadur Bala Goud
Nizamabad	234	Jukkal (SC)	TDP	B. Pandari	INC	Gangaram
Nizamabad	235	Banswada	TDP	Parige Srinivas Reddy	INC	Srimathi Beena Devi
Nizamabad	236	Bodhan	TDP	Bashiruddin Babukhan	INC	Taher Bin Hamdan
Nizamabad	237	Nizamabad	TDP	Satish Pawar	INC	Dharmapuri Srinivas
Nizamabad	238	Dichpalli	TDP	Mandava V. Rao	INC	Maheshwar Goud
Adilabad	239	Mudhole	TDP	Narayan Rao Patel	INC	G. Gaddenna
Adilabad	240	Nirmal	TDP	S. Venugopala Chary	INC	P. Narsa Reddy
Adilabad	241	Boath (ST)	TDP	G. Nagesh	INC	Kishan Chauhan
Adilabad	242	Adilabad	TDP	Chilkuri Waman Reddy	INC	Chilkuri Ramchandra Reddy
Adilabad	243	Khanapur (ST)	TDP	Ajmeera Govind Naik	INC	Kotnak Bhim Rao
Adilabad	244	Asifabad (SC)	CPI	Gunda Mallesh	INC	Dasari Narsaiah
Adilabad	245	Luxettipet	TDP	Gone Hanmantha Rao	INC	Gone Venkatasrinivasa Rao
Adilabad	246	Sirpur	TDP	K. V. Narayana Rao	INC	K. V. Keshavulu
Adilabad	247	Chinnur (SC)	TDP	Boda Janardhan	INC	Sothuku Sanjeeva Rao
Karimnagar	248	Manthani	TDP	Chandrupatla Ram Reddy	INC	D. Sripada Rao
Karimnagar	249	Peddapalli	TDP	Birudu Rajamallu	INC	Geetla Mukunda Reddy
Karimnagar	250	Mydaram (SC)	TDP	Koppula Eshwar	INC	Rajalingam Badikela
Karimnagar	251	Huzurabad	TDP	E. Peddi Reddy	INC	Bopparaju Laxmikantha Rao
Karimnagar	252	Kamalapur	TDP	Muddasani Damodar Reddy	INC	Kethiri Sai Reddy
Karimnagar	253	Indurthi	CPI	Deshini Chinna Mallaiah	INC	Bomma Venkateshwar
Karimnagar	254	Karimnagar	TDP	Juvvadi Chandra Sekhar Rao	INC	Velichala Jagapathi Rao
Karimnagar	255	Choppadandi	TDP	N. Ramkishan Rao	INC	Koduri Satyanarayana Goud
Karimnagar	256	Jagtial	TDP	L. Ramana	INC	T. Jeevan Reddy
Karimnagar	257	Buggaram	TDP	Shikari Vishwanatham	INC	Juvvadi Rathnakar Rao
Karimnagar	258	Metpalli	TDP	Laxmi Vaddepalli	INC	Ramlu Komireddi
Karimnagar	259	Sircilla	CPI	C. Rajeshwara Rao	INC	Puli Vittal
Karimnagar	260	Narella (SC)	TDP	Suddala Devaiah	INC	Gotte Dhoopathi
Warangal	261	Cheriyal	TDP	Nimma Raja Reddy	INC	Gorla Siddaiah
Warangal	262	Jangaon	CPI(M)	Charagonda Raji Reddy	INC	Ponnala Lakshmaiah
Warangal	263	Chennur	TDP	N. Yethi Raja Rao	INC	M. Jagannadham
Warangal	264	Dornakal	TDP	Vontikommu Ram Chandra	INC	Dharamsoth Redya Naik
Warangal	265	Mahbubabad	CPI	Bandi Pullaiah	INC	Janna Janardhan Reddy
Warangal	266	Narsampet	TDP	Revuri Prakash Reddy	INC	Baswaraj Saraiah
Warangal	267	Wardhannapet	TDP	Errabelli Dayakar Rao	INC	Errabelly Varada Rao
Warangal	268	Ghanpur (SC)	TDP	Kadiyam Srihari	INC	B. Arogyam
Warangal	269	Warangal	TDP	Donepudi Rameshbabu	INC	T. P. Rao
Warangal	270	Hanamkonda	TDP	Dasyam Pranay Bhasker	INC	P. V. Ranga Rao
Warangal	271	Shyampet	TDP	S. Madhusudhana Chary	INC	Madadi Narasimha Reddy
Warangal	272	Parkal (SC)	CPI	Potharaju Saraiah	INC	Sammaiah Bochu
Warangal	273	Mulug (ST)	TDP	Azmeera Chandulal	INC	Porika Jagan Naik
Khammam	274	Bhadrachalam (ST)	CPI(M)	Kunja Bojji	INC	Sode Bhadraiah
Khammam	275	Burgampahad (ST)	CPI	Kunja Biksham	INC	Chanda Lingaiah
Khammam	276	Kothagudem	TDP	Koneru Nageswara Rao	INC	Vanama Venkateswara Rao
Khammam	277	Sathupalli	TDP	Thummala Nageswara Rao	INC	Jalagam Prasada Rao
Khammam	278	Madhira	CPI(M)	Bodepudi Venkateswara Rao	INC	Seelam Sidda Reddy
Khammam	279	Palair (SC)	CPI(M)	Sandra Venkata Veeraiah	INC	Sambani Chandrashekar
Khammam	280	Khammam	CPI	Puvvada Nageswar Rao	INC	Mohammad Zaheer Ali
Khammam	281	Shujatnagar	CPI	Mohammed Rajab Ali	INC	Chekuri Kasaiah
Khammam	282	Yelland (ST)	CPI	Vooke Abbaiah	INC	Banoth Somla Naik
Nalgonda	283	Tungaturthi	CPI(M)	Vardelli Buchi Ramulu	INC	Janna Reddy Sudeer Reddy
Nalgonda	284	Suryapet (SC)	TDP	Sudarshan Akarapu	INC	Jannapala Yellaiah
Nalgonda	285	Kodad	TDP	Venepally Chander Rao	INC	N. Uttam Kumar Reddy
Nalgonda	286	Miryalguda	CPI(M)	Julakanti Ranga Reddy	INC	Tippana Vijaya Simhareddy
Nalgonda	287	Chalakurthi	TDP	G. Rama Murthy	INC	Kunduru Jana Reddy
Nalgonda	288	Nakrekal	CPI(M)	Narra Raghava Reddy	INC	Rapolu Ganesha
Nalgonda	289	Nalgonda	CPI(M)	Nandyala Narsimha Reddy	INC	Chakilam Srinivasa Rao
Nalgonda	290	Ramannapet	CPI	Gurram Yadagiri Reddy	INC	Kommu Papaiah
Nalgonda	291	Alair (SC)	TDP	Motkupalli Narasimhulu	INC	Kududula Nagesh
Nalgonda	292	Bhongir	TDP	Alimineti Madhava Reddy	INC	Narsa Reddy Madugula
Nalgonda	293	Mungode	CPI	Vujjini Narayan Rao	INC	Malreddy Raghumareddy
Nalgonda	294	Deverkonda (ST)	CPI	Badhu Chowhan Moodu	INC	Ramavath Shankar Naik

== Results ==
=== Vote share ===
Vote share by party
1. Telugu Desam Party (44.1%)
2. Indian National Congress (33.9%)
3. Bharatiya Janata Party (3.89%)
4. Communist Party of India (3.39%)
5. Communist Party of India (Marxist) (2.96%)
6. Others (11.8%)

=== Seat share ===
Seat share by party
1. Telugu Desam Party (73.5%)
2. Indian National Congress (8.84%)
3. Communist Party of India (6.46%)
4. Communist Party of India (Marxist) (5.10%)
5. Bharatiya Janata Party (1.02%)
6. Others (5.10%)

=== Results by party ===
Source: Election Commission of India
Alliance/Party		Popular vote			Seats		
Alliance/Party		Votes	%	±pp	Contested	Won	+/−
National Front	Telugu Desam Party	13,743,842	44.14	▲7.60	251	216	▲142
National Front	Communist Party of India	1,056,789	3.39	▲0.75	21	19	▲11
National Front	Communist Party of India (Marxist)	923,204	2.96	▲0.50	16	15	▲9
National Front	Janata Dal	27,928	0.09	▼0.28	1	0	▼1
National Front	Total	15,751,763	50.58	▲6.79	289	250	▲156
Indian National Congress		10,540,182	33.85	▼13.24	294	26	▼155
Bharatiya Janata Party		1,210,878	3.89	▲2.11	280	3	▼2
Other parties		937,868	3.02	N/A	115	3	N/A
Independents		2,696,143	8.66	▲2.08	1,953	12	▼3
Total		31,136,834	100.00	N/A	3,219	294	N/A
Vote statistics
Valid votes		31,136,834	98.03				
Invalid votes		624,386	1.97				
Votes cast/ turnout		31,763,466	71.02				
Abstentions		12,961,625	28.98				
Registered voters		44,725,091					

=== Results by district ===
District	Seats						
District	Seats	TDP	INC	CPI	CPM	BJP	OTH
Srikakulam	12	11	1	—N/a	—N/a	—N/a	—N/a
Vizianagaram	12	12	—N/a	—N/a	—N/a	—N/a	—N/a
Visakhapatnam	13	11	—N/a	2	—N/a	—N/a	—N/a
East Godavari	21	19	1	—N/a	—N/a	—N/a	1
West Godavari	16	13	1	1	1	—N/a	—N/a
Krishna	17	11	2	1	1	—N/a	1
Guntur	19	13	3	1	2	—N/a	—N/a
Prakasam	13	8	1	—N/a	1	—N/a	3
Nellore	11	8	1	—N/a	1	—N/a	1
Chittoor	15	14	1	—N/a	—N/a	—N/a	—N/a
Kadapa	11	7	4	—N/a	—N/a	—N/a	—N/a
Anantapur	14	12	1	1	—N/a	—N/a	—N/a
Kurnool	13	9	4	—N/a	1	—N/a	—N/a
Mahbubnagar	13	11	—N/a	—N/a	—N/a	—N/a	2
Ranga Reddy	6	5	—N/a	—N/a	1	—N/a	—N/a
Hyderabad	13	4	4	—N/a	—N/a	2	3
Medak	10	9	—N/a	1	—N/a	—N/a	—N/a
Nizamabad	9	8	1	—N/a	—N/a	—N/a	—N/a
Adilabad	9	7	—N/a	1	—N/a	—N/a	1
Karimnagar	13	9	—N/a	2	—N/a	1	1
Warangal	13	9	1	2	1	—N/a	—N/a
Khammam	9	2	—N/a	4	3	—N/a	—N/a
Nalgonda	12	5	—N/a	3	3	—N/a	1
Total	294	216	26	19	15	3	15

=== Results by constituency ===
District	Constituency		Winner			Runner Up			Margin	
District	No.	Name	Candidate	Party	Votes	Candidate	Party	Votes	Margin	
Srikakulam	1	Ichchapuram	Achuta Ramayya Dakkata	TDP	37,859	Trinadha Reddy Buddhala	INC	24,375	Margin	13,484
Srikakulam	2	Sompeta	Gouthu Syama Sunder Sivaji	TDP	52,894	Balakrishna Vadisa	IND	21,104	25,663	
Srikakulam	3	Tekkali	N. T. Rama Rao	TDP	66,200	Babu Rao Vajja	INC	25,310	40,890	
Srikakulam	4	Harishchandrapuram	Yerrannaidu Kinjarapu	TDP	63,212	Raghavarao Sampathirao	INC	35,992	27,220	
Srikakulam	5	Narasannapeta	Baggu Lakshmana Rao	TDP	48,286	Dharmana Prasada Rao	INC	42,558	7,971	
Srikakulam	6	Pathapatnam	Kalamata Mohanrao	TDP	48,425	Dharmana Narayana Rao	INC	36,889	11,536	
Srikakulam	7	Kothuru (ST)	Nimmaka Gopala Rao	TDP	50,895	Viswasarai Narasimha Rao	INC	38,328	17,208	
Vizianagaram	8	Naguru (ST)	Nimmaka Jayaraju	TDP	56,095	Satrucharla Vijaya Rama Raju	INC	23,824	32,271	
Vizianagaram	9	Parvathipuram	Yarra Krishna Murty	TDP	47,448	Mariserla Sivunnaidu	INC	37,468	9,980	
Vizianagaram	10	Salur (ST)	R. P. Bhanj Deo	TDP	54,702	Vikrama Chandra Sanyasi Raju	INC	33,547	25,332	
Vizianagaram	11	Bobbili	Appala Naidu Sambangi Venkata Chinna	TDP	38,725	Dr. Jagan Mohan Rao Peddinti	INC	32,638	6,087	
Vizianagaram	12	Therlam	Thentu Jayaprakash	TDP	50,250	Vasireddi Varada Rama Rao	INC	46,741	3,508	
Srikakulam	13	Vunukuru	Palavalasa Rajasekharam	INC	53,559	Kimidi Kalavenkata Rao	TDP	49,301	4,258	
Srikakulam	14	Palakonda (SC)	Bhyadrayya Tale	TDP	45,818	Amruthakumari P.J	INC	23,057	20,974	
Srikakulam	15	Amadalavalasa	Thammineni Seetharam	TDP	44,783	Chittibabu Boddepalli	INC	39,549	5,234	
Srikakulam	16	Srikakulam	Gunda Appala Suryanarayana	TDP	70,441	Andhavarapu Varaha Narasimham	INC	38,868	31,573	
Srikakulam	17	Etcherla (SC)	K. Pratibha Bharati	TDP	59,934	Jampu Latchayya	INC	29,179	30,775	
Vizianagaram	18	Cheepurupalli	Gadde Babu Rao	TDP	56,988	Kemburi Rama Mohan Rao	INC	39,923	17,065	
Vizianagaram	19	Gajapathinagaram	Padala Aruna	TDP	46,455	Taddi Sanyasinayudu	INC	39,636	6,819	
Vizianagaram	20	Vizianagaram	Ashok Gajapathi Raju	TDP	60,893	Kolagatla Veera Bhadra Swamy	INC	39,862	21,031	
Vizianagaram	21	Sathivada	Potnuru Suryanarayana	TDP	52,049	Penumatcha Samba Siva Raju	INC	47,515	4,534	
Vizianagaram	22	Bhogapuram	Pathivada Narayanaswamy Naidu	TDP	45,939	Kommuru Appala Swamy	INC	41,443	4,496	
Visakhapatnam	23	Bheemunipatnam	Rajasagi Devi Prasanna Appala Narasimha Raju	TDP	64,726	Korada Sankara Rao	INC	27,877	36,849	
Visakhapatnam	24	Visakhapatnam-I	Abdul Rehman Sheku	TDP	35,344	Gurunandha Rao Gudivada	INC	32,180	3,164	
Visakhapatnam	25	Visakhapatnam-II	Palla Simhachalam	TDP	82,784	Yandrapu Mariadas	INC	61,011	21,773	
Visakhapatnam	26	Pendurthi	Anjaneyulu M	CPI	95,408	Dronamraju Srinivasa Rao	INC	64,421	23,589	
Vizianagaram	27	Uttarapalli	Kolla Appalanaidu	TDP	53,754	Kalavathi Boddu	INC	24,307	29,447	
Vizianagaram	28	Srungavarapukota (ST)	Dukku Labudu Bariki	TDP	57,369	Setti Ganghadhara Swamy	INC	38,289	19,080	
Visakhapatnam	29	Paderu (ST)	Kottagulli Chitti Naidu	TDP	27,923	Balaraju Matsyarasa	INC	15,685	12,238	
Visakhapatnam	30	Madugula	Reddi Satyanarayana	TDP	51,230	Kilaparti Suri Apparao	INC	24,139	27,091	
Visakhapatnam	31	Chodavaram	Gunuru Yerrunaidu	TDP	61,741	Balireddi Satyarao	INC	42,665	19,076	
Visakhapatnam	32	Anakapalli	Dadi Veerabhadra Rao	TDP	45,577	Dantuluri Dilip Kumar	IND	43,966	1,611	
Visakhapatnam	33	Paravada	Bandaru Satyanarayana Murthy	TDP	66,403	Eti Vijaya Laxmi	INC	24,767	41,336	
Visakhapatnam	34	Elamanchili	Pappala Chalapathi Rao	TDP	57,793	Nagireddi Prabhakararao	INC	33,547	24,246	
Visakhapatnam	35	Payakaraopet (SC)	Kakara Nookaraju	TDP	39,666	Gantela Sumana	INC	35,657	4,009	
Visakhapatnam	36	Narsipatnam	Chintakayala Ayyanna Patrudu	TDP	62,385	Rajasagi Ramachandra Raju	INC	41,206	21,179	
Visakhapatnam	37	Chintapalle (ST)	Demudu Goddeti	CPI	35,257	Mottadam Veera Venkata Satyanarayana	IND	30,175	5,082	
East Godavari	38	Yellavaram (ST)	Seethamsety Venkateswara Rao	TDP	42,468	Ratnabhai Tadapatla	INC	22,877	19,591	
East Godavari	39	Burugupudi	Venkata Ramakrishna Korpu	TDP	54,224	Baddireddy Appanna Dora	INC	34,848	19,376	
East Godavari	40	Rajahmundry	Gorantla Butchaiah Chowdary	TDP	48,079	Vundavalli Arunakumar	INC	41,459	6,620	
East Godavari	41	Kadiam	Veerabhadra Rao Vaddi	TDP	84,098	Jakkampudi Ramamohana Rao	INC	58,897	25,201	
East Godavari	42	Jaggampeta	Jyothula Venkata Apparao (Nehru)	TDP	64,186	Thota Venkatachalam	INC	43,885	20,301	
East Godavari	43	Peddapuram	Boddu Bhaskara Rama Rao	TDP	55,148	Pantham Padmanabham	INC	42,690	12,458	
East Godavari	44	Prathipadu (East Godavari)	Parvatha Subbarao	TDP	68,066	Mudragada Padmanabham	INC	46,429	21,637	
East Godavari	45	Tuni	Yanamala Rama Krishnudu	TDP	59,250	Maddala Venkata Chalapathi Rao	INC	41,457	17,793	
East Godavari	46	Pithapuram	Venna Nageswararao	TDP	43,905	Sangisetti Veerabhadra Rao	INC	32,277	11,628	
East Godavari	47	Sampara	Tirumani Satyalinga Naicker	TDP	69,554	Pantham Gandhi Mohan	INC	46,164	23,390	
East Godavari	48	Kakinada	Mootha Gopala Krishna	TDP	56,057	Swamy Malladi	INC	35,373	20,684	
East Godavari	49	Tallarevu	Chikkala Ramachandra Rao	TDP	58,374	Dommeti Venkateswarlu	INC	39,306	19,068	
East Godavari	50	Anaparthy	Nallamilli Moola Reddy	TDP	48,281	Tetali Rama Reddy	INC	42,281	6,000	
East Godavari	51	Ramachandrapuram	Thota Thrimurtulu	IND	34,027	Guttula Sri Suryanarayana Babu	TDP	30,923	3,104	
East Godavari	52	Alamuru	V. V. S. S. Chowdary	TDP	67,844	Venkatareddy Sangita	INC	31,134	36,710	
East Godavari	53	Mummidivaram (SC)	Bathina Subbarao	INC	49,090	Anand Sagar Moka	TDP	41,473	9,565	
East Godavari	54	Allavaram (SC)	Aithabathula Jogeswara Venkata Buchi Maheswara Rao	TDP	42,950	Veera Raghavulu Paramata	INC	26,366	16,584	
East Godavari	55	Amalapuram	Metla Satyanarayana Rao	TDP	52,926	Kudupudi Prabhakara Rao	INC	36,112	16,814	
East Godavari	56	Kothapeta	Bandaru Satyananda Rao	TDP	55,117	Chirla Soma Sundara Reddi	INC	39,576	15,541	
East Godavari	57	Nagaram (SC)	Undru Krishna Rao	TDP	54,546	Ganapathi Rao Neethipudi	INC	26,490	28,056	
East Godavari	58	Razole	Alluri Venkata Surya Narayana Raju	TDP	48,505	Gangayya Mangena	INC	41,231	7,274	
West Godavari	59	Narasapuram	Kothapalli Subbarayudu	TDP	62,693	Prabhakar Parakala	INC	47,246	15,447	
West Godavari	60	Palacole	Allu Venkata Satyanarayana	TDP	50,750	Hararamajogaiah Ch. V	INC	36,350	14,400	
West Godavari	61	Achanta (SC)	Digupati Rajagopal	CPI(M)	53,510	Bunga Saradhi	INC	30,872	22,638	
West Godavari	62	Bhimavaram	Penmetsa Venkata Narasimha Raju	TDP	51,478	Kamala Kanta Kasturi Bhupathiraju	INC	44,823	6,655	
West Godavari	63	Undi	Kalidindi Ramachandra Raju	TDP	52,942	Katari Prabhakara Rao	INC	43,734	9,208	
West Godavari	64	Penugonda	Satyanarayana Vanka	CPI	49,194	Pithani Satyanarayana	INC	36,263	12,931	
West Godavari	65	Tanuku	Mullapudi Venkata Krishnarao	TDP	60,833	Ch. Achutharama Prasad	INC	38,277	22,556	
West Godavari	66	Attili	Kanumuru Bapiraju	INC	50,692	Dandu Sivaramaraju	TDP	44,272	6,420	
West Godavari	67	Tadepalligudem	Kanaka Sundararao Pasala	TDP	57,994	Kottu Satyanarayana	INC	50,175	7,933	
West Godavari	68	Ungutur	Kondreddy Viswanadham	TDP	69,667	Chava Ramakrishna Rao	INC	50,805	18,862	
West Godavari	69	Dendulur	Garapati Sambasiva Rao	TDP	65,916	Pathuri John Paul	INC	37,055	28,861	
West Godavari	70	Eluru	Maradani Rangarao	TDP	57,808	Maganti Varalaxmi Devi	INC	48,561	9,247	
West Godavari	71	Gopalpuram (SC)	Babajirao Jonnakuti	TDP	64,848	Vivekananda Karupati	INC	25,388	39,460	
West Godavari	72	Kovvur	Pendyala Venkata Krishna Rao	TDP	66,395	G S Rao	INC	50,153	16,242	
West Godavari	73	Polavaram (ST)	Singanna Dora Punem	TDP	64,644	Badisa Durga Rao	INC	32,446	32,198	
West Godavari	74	Chintalapudi	Kotagiri Vidyadhara Rao	TDP	68,504	Mandalapu Satyanarayana	INC	54,721	13,783	
Krishna	75	Jaggayyapet	Nettem Raghuram	TDP	60,893	Mukkapati Venkateswara Rao	INC	41,838	19,055	
Krishna	76	Nandigama	Devineni Venkata Ramana	TDP	57,854	Sree Gopala Krishna Sai Babbellapati	INC	47,603	10,251	
Krishna	77	Vijayawada West	Kakarlapudi Subba Raju	CPI	60,369	Baig M.K	INC	44,393	15,976	
Krishna	78	Vijayawada East	Vangaveeti Ratna Kumari	INC	44,783	Jayaraju B.S	TDP	28,599	16,184	
Krishna	79	Kankipadu	Raja Sekhar (Nehru) Devineni	TDP	91,347	Yalamanchili Nageswara Rao	INC	69,362	21,985	
Krishna	80	Mylavaram	J. Ramesh Babu	TDP	64,716	Komati Sudhakara Rao	INC	57,365	7,351	
Krishna	81	Tiruvuru (SC)	Nallagatla Swamy Das	TDP	64,035	Koneru Ranga Rao	INC	56,049	7,986	
Krishna	82	Nuzvid	Kotagiri Hanumantha Rao	TDP	63,202	Paladugu Venkata Rao	INC	50,377	12,825	
Krishna	83	Gannavaram	Gadde Rama Mohan	IND	45,824	Dasari Venkata Balavardhana Rao	TDP	35,121	10,703	
Krishna	84	Vuyyur	Anne Babu Rao	TDP	45,373	Vangaveeti Sobhana Chalapati Rao	INC	33,092	12,281	
Krishna	85	Gudivada	Ravi Sobhanadri Chowdary	TDP	59,022	Eswar Kumar Katari	INC	38,032	20,990	
Krishna	86	Mudinepalli	Yerneni Sita Devi	TDP	45,989	Pinnamaneni Venkateswara Rao	INC	41,160	4,829	
Krishna	87	Kaikalur	Namburu Venkata Rama Raju (RAMU)	INC	51,997	Raja Ramchandra Yerneni (RAJA BABU)	TDP	46,467	5,530	
Krishna	88	Malleswaram	Kagita Venkata Rao	TDP	50,791	Buragadda Veda Vyas	INC	42,680	8,111	
Krishna	89	Bandar	Ambati Brahmanaiah	TDP	53,301	Perni Krishna Murthy	INC	37,023	16,278	
Krishna	90	Nidumolu (SC)	Paturu Ramaiah	CPI(M)	45,052	Vinaya Babu Munipalli	IND	31,989	13,063	
Krishna	91	Avanigadda	Simhadri Satyanarayana Rao	TDP	45,507	Mandali Buddha Prasad	INC	40,130	5,377	
Guntur	92	Kuchinapudi	Seetharamamma Evuru	TDP	41,621	Mopidevi Venkata Ramana Rao	INC	39,117	2,504	
Guntur	93	Repalle	Mummaneni Venkata Subbaiah	TDP	50,095	Ambati Rambabu	INC	23,746	26,349	
Guntur	94	Vemuru	Alapati Rajendra Prasad	TDP	46,226	Alapati Dharma Rao	INC	36,032	10,194	
Guntur	95	Duggirala	Gudibandi Venkata Reddy	INC	41,930	Kotaru Koteswara Rao	TDP	39,696	2,234	
Guntur	96	Tenali	Ravi Ravindranadh	TDP	43,483	Nadendla Bhaskara Rao	INC	29,952	13,531	
Guntur	97	Ponnur	Dhulipalla Narendra Kumar	TDP	52,087	T. Venkata Ramaiah	INC	30,358	21,729	
Guntur	98	Bapatla	Muppalaneni Seshagiri Rao	TDP	63,001	Kathi Padma Rao	BSP	21,507	41,494	
Guntur	99	Prathipadu (Guntur)	Makineni Peda Rathaiah	TDP	50,765	Hanumaiah Chebrolu	INC	37,786	12,979	
Guntur	100	Guntur-I	S. M. Ziauddin	TDP	53,745	Mohammed Jani	INC	26,950	26,795	
Guntur	101	Guntur-II	Challa Venkata Krishna Reddy	TDP	51,322	Jayarambabu Chadalavada	INC	38,554	12,768	
Guntur	102	Mangalagiri	Nimmagadda Rama Mohan Rao	CPI(M)	41,447	Umamaheswara Rao Damarla	INC	29,690	14,889	
Guntur	103	Tadikonda (SC)	G.M.N.V. Prasad	CPI	53,069	T. Venkaiah	INC	38,068	15,001	
Guntur	104	Sattenapalli	Puthumbaka Bharathi	CPI(M)	54,465	Rayapati Srinivas	INC	52,128	2,337	
Guntur	105	Peddakurapadu	Kanna Lakshminarayana	INC	68,677	Sambasiva Reddy Venna	TDP	56,555	12,122	
Guntur	106	Gurzala	Yarapathineni Srinivasarao	TDP	62,943	Rameshchandra Dath Kanakam	INC	38,976	23,967	
Guntur	107	Macherla	Punna Reddy Kurri	TDP	53,108	Sundararamireddy Pinnelli	INC	46,634	6,474	
Guntur	108	Vinukonda	Veerapaneni Yallamanda Rao	IND	57,660	Nannapaneni Rajakumari	INC	54,356	3,304	
Guntur	109	Narasaraopet	Kodela Siva Prasada Rao	TDP	66,196	Balakotireddy Dodda	INC	56,896	9,300	
Guntur	110	Chilakaluripet	Somepalli Sambaiah	INC	52,650	Malempati Venkata Narasimha Rao	TDP	52,519	131	
Prakasam	111	Chirala	Paleti Rama Rao	TDP	54,039	K. Rosaiah	INC	50,433	3,606	
Prakasam	112	Parchur	Gade Venkata Reddy	INC	45,843	Brahmananda Reddy Battula	TDP	46,365	2,202	
Prakasam	113	Martur	Gottipati Hanumantharao	IND	55,482	Balaramakrishnamurthy Karanam	INC	33,763	9,133	
Prakasam	114	Addanki	Bachina Chenchu Garataiah	IND	50,757	Jagarlamudi Raghava Rao	INC	43,708	7,049	
Prakasam	115	Ongole	Edara Hari Babu	TDP	53,487	Venkateswarlu Yedlapudi	INC	33,608	19,879	
Prakasam	116	Santhanuthalapadu (SC)	Chenchaiah Thavanam	CPI(M)	56,120	Gurrala Venkata Seshu	INC	31,186	24,934	
Prakasam	117	Kandukur	Divi Sivaram	TDP	52,376	Manugunta Maheedhar Reddy	INC	46,351	6,025	
Prakasam	118	Kanigiri	Mukku Kasi Reddy	TDP	52,025	Erigineni Thirupathi Naidu	INC	37,288	14,737	
Prakasam	119	Kondepi	Damacharla Anjaneyulu	TDP	55,913	Achyutakumar Gundapaneni	INC	34,958	20,955	
Prakasam	120	Cumbum	Chappidi Vengaiah	TDP	44,294	Kandula Nagarjuna Reddy	INC	39,913	4,381	
Prakasam	121	Darsi	Narapasetty Sreeramulu	TDP	50,769	Mohammed Ghouse Shaik	INC	34,071	16,698	
Prakasam	122	Markapur	Janke Venkata Reddy	IND	60,328	Kunduru Pedda Konda Reddy	INC	56,504	20,841	
Prakasam	123	Giddalur	Pidathala Ramabhupala Reddy	TDP	29,496	Mudiam Peera Reddy	IND	20,035	9,461	
Nellore	124	Udayagiri	Kambham Vijayarami Reddy	IND	51,712	Janakiram Madala	INC	26,793	24,919	
Nellore	125	Kavali	Kaliki Yanadi Reddy	INC	42,968	Vanteru Venugopal Reddy	TDP	35,528	7,440	
Nellore	126	Allur	Jakka Venkaiah	CPI(M)	42,806	Katamreddy Vishnuvardhan Reddy	INC	40,906	1,900	
Nellore	127	Kovur	Nallapareddy Prasanna Kumar Reddy	TDP	60,442	Chevuru Deva Kumar Reddy	INC	25,860	34,582	
Nellore	128	Atmakur (Nellore)	Kommi Lakshmaiah Naidu	TDP	59,166	Dr. B. Sundararamireddy	INC	41,224	17,942	
Nellore	129	Rapur	Yellasiri Srinivasulu Reddy	TDP	52,180	Anam Ramanarayana Reddy	INC	43,791	8,389	
Nellore	130	Nellore	T. Ramesh Reddy	TDP	63,806	P.V. Prasanna Kumar Reddy	INC	53,824	9,982	
Nellore	131	Sarvepalli	Somireddy Chandra Mohan Reddy	TDP	68,855	Chittooru Venkata Sesha Reddy	INC	35,080	33,775	
Nellore	132	Gudur (SC)	Balli Durgaprasad Rao	TDP	64,736	Patra Prakasa Rao	INC	36,386	28,350	
Nellore	133	Sulurpet (SC)	Parasa Venkata Rathnaiah	TDP	63,219	Pasala Penchalaiah	INC	36,218	27,001	
Nellore	134	Venkatagiri	Raja Vvrk. Yachendra Velugoti	TDP	61,324	Nedurumalli Janardhana Reddy	INC	38,158	16,996	
Chittoor	135	Srikalahasti	Bojjala Gopala Krishna Reddy	TDP	59,827	Chadalavada Krishnamoorthy	INC	55,606	4,221	
Chittoor	136	Satyavedu (SC)	Emsurajan	TDP	62,618	Kalathur Narayana Swamy	INC	33,563	29,055	
Chittoor	137	Nagari	V. Doraswamy Raju	TDP	65,432	Reddyvari Chenga Reddy	INC;	52,327	13,105	
Chittoor	138	Puttur	Gali Muddukrishnama Naidu	TDP	56,673	Reddivari Rajasekhar Reddy	INC	46,040	10,633	
Chittoor	139	Vepanjeri (SC)	R.Gandhi	TDP	55,061	Gummadi Kuthuhalamma	INC	27,006	28,055	
Chittoor	140	Chittoor	C. K. Jayachandra Reddy	INC	46,709	A. S. Manohar	TDP	44,623	2,086	
Chittoor	141	Palmaner (SC)	Patnam Subbaiah	TDP	79,580	M. Thippeswamy	INC	34,982	44,598	
Chittoor	142	Kuppam	N. Chandrababu Naidu	TDP	81,210	R.Gopinath	INC	24,622	56,588	
Chittoor	143	Punganur	N. Ramakrishna Reddy	TDP	71,826	N. Sreedhar Reddy	INC	30,173	41,653	
Chittoor	144	Madanpalle	Ratakonda Krishna Sagar	TDP	49,981	Alluri Subramanyam	INC	30,490	19,491	
Chittoor	145	Thamballapalle	Anipireddi Venkatalakshmi Devamma	TDP	45,033	Kadapa Prabhakar Reddy	INC	37,658	7,375	
Chittoor	146	Vayalpad	Chintala Ramachandra Reddy	TDP	61,901	Kiran Kumar Reddy	INC	37,788	24,113	
Chittoor	147	Pileru	G. V. Sreenatha Reddy	TDP	57,160	Peddireddy Ramachandra Reddy	INC	47,505	9,655	
Chittoor	148	Chandragiri	Nara Ramamurthy Naidu	TDP	60,311	Galla Aruna Kumari	INC	43,959	16,352	
Chittoor	149	Tirupathi	A. Mohan	TDP	75,877	Mabbu Rami Reddy	INC	41,282	34,595	
Kadapa	150	Kodur (SC)	Chennaiah Vaddi	TDP	52,335	Kotapati Dhanunjaya	INC	37,573	14,762	
Kadapa	151	Rajampet	Pasupuleti Brahmaiah	TDP	54,438	Kasireddi Madan Mohan Reddy	INC	31,085	23,353	
Kadapa	152	Rayachoti	Mandipalli Narayana Reddy	INC	46,948	Sugavasi Palakondrayudu	TDP	45,542	1,406	
Kadapa	153	Lakkireddipalli	Gadikota Dwarakanadha Reddy	TDP	47,183	Reddappagari Rajagopal Reddy	INC	36,337	10,846	
Kadapa	154	Cuddapa	S. A. Khaleel Basha	TDP	60,363	Kandula Sivananda Reddy	INC	57,859	2,504	
Kadapa	155	Badvel	Bijivemula Veera Reddy	TDP	67,083	V. Sivarama Krishna Rao	INC	40,087	26,996	
Kadapa	156	Mydukur	D. L. Ravindra Reddy	INC	47,046	Settipalle Raghurami Reddy	TDP	47,018	28	
Kadapa	157	Proddatur	Nandyala Varadarajula Reddy	INC	45,738	Ramasubbareddy Kovvuru	TDP	38,131	7,607	
Kadapa	158	Jammalamadugu	Ponnapureddy Rama Subba Reddy	TDP	54,903	Chadipiralla Adinarayana Reddy	INC	43,397	11,506	
Kadapa	159	Kamalapuram	Gandluru Veera Siva Reddy	TDP	52,577	Mule Venkata Mysura Reddy	INC	46,414	6,163	
Kadapa	160	Pulivendla	Y. S. Vivekananda Reddy	INC	90,673	Sirigireddy Ramamuni Reddy	TDP	19,093	71,580	
Anantapur	161	Kadiri	Suryanarayana	TDP	83,328	Mohammad Shakeer	INC	28,097	55,231	
Anantapur	162	Nallamada	T.D. Nagaraja Reddy	TDP	67,432	Agisam Veerappa	INC	22,875	44,557	
Anantapur	163	Gorantla	Nimmala Kristappa	TDP	56,223	L Ramana Reddy	INC	30,781	25,442	
Anantapur	164	Hindupur	N. T. Rama Rao	TDP	88,058	J.C. Prabhakar Reddy	INC	28,008	60,050	
Anantapur	165	Madakasira	Y.T. Prabhakara Reddy	TDP	59,475	Raghu Veera Reddy	INC	53,076	6,399	
Anantapur	166	Penukonda	Paritala Ravindra	TDP	66,034	Sane Venkata Ramana Reddy	INC	37,987	28,047	
Anantapur	167	Kalyandrug (SC)	B.C. Govindappa	TDP	85,061	M. Lakshmidevi	INC	28,983	56,078	
Anantapur	168	Rayadrug	Bandi Hulikuntappa	TDP	62,716	P. Venugopala Reddy	INC	41,983	20,733	
Anantapur	169	Uravakonda	Payyavula Keshav	TDP	50,306	Yellareddy Gari Sivarama Reddy	IND	32,615	17,691	
Anantapur	170	Gooty	Gadhi Lingappa	TDP	41,275	R. Sainath Gowd	IND	30,447	10,828	
Anantapur	171	Singanamala (SC)	K. Jayaram	TDP	65,535	S. Sairam	INC	18,337	47,198	
Anantapur	172	Anantapur	K. Ramakrishna	CPI	68,294	B. Narayana Reddy	INC	45,930	22,364	
Anantapur	173	Dhamavaram	Venkata Naidu Guta	TDP	53,076	Kethireddy Surya Pratap Reddy	IND	52,030	1,070	
Anantapur	174	Tadpatri	J. C. Diwakar Reddy	INC	70,693	Peram Nagi Reddy	TDP	47,813	22,880	
Kurnool	175	Alur (SC)	Eranna Masala	TDP	38,058	Moolinti Mareppa	INC	32,793	5,265	
Kurnool	176	Adoni	Konka Meenakshi Naidu	TDP	56,192	Raichooti Ramaiah	INC	39,601	16,591	
Kurnool	177	Yemmiganur	B. V. Mohan Reddy	TDP	58,382	Kesava Reddy	INC	51,009	7,373	
Kurnool	178	Kodumur (SC)	M. Sikhamani	INC	55,493	Bangi Ananthaiayh	TDP	31,698	23,795	
Kurnool	179	Kurnool	Abdul Gafoor M	CPI(M)	59,121	K.E.Krishna Murthy	INC	50,298	8,823	
Kurnool	180	Pattikonda	S. V. Subba Reddy	TDP	56,049	Patil Seshi Reddy	INC	37,377	18,672	
Kurnool	181	Dhone	Kotla Vijaya Bhaskara Reddy	INC	67,685	Suravaram Sudhakar Reddy	CPI	29,590	38,095	
Kurnool	182	Koilkuntla	Karra Subba Reddy	TDP	51,226	Challa Ramakrishna Reddy	INC	49,524	1,702	
Kurnool	183	Allagadda	Bhuma Nagi Reddy	TDP	64,146	Gangula Prabhakar Reddy	INC	48,343	15,803	
Kurnool	184	Panyam	Katasani Rama Bhupal Reddy	INC	72,629	K. Chandra Sekhara Reddy	TDP	35,240	37,389	
Kurnool	185	Nandikotkur	Byreddy Rajasekhara Reddy	TDP	65,864	M. Gidda Reddy	INC	37,747	28,117	
Kurnool	186	Nandyal	N.M.D.Farooq	TDP	64,691	K. Maqbool Hussain	INC	24,878	39,813	
Kurnool	187	Atmakur (Kurnool)	Erasu Prathap Reddy	INC	48,332	Budda Vengala Reddy	TDP	42,303	6,029	
Mahabubnagar	188	Achampet (SC)	P. Ramulu	TDP	70,390	Devarapaga Kirankumar	INC	24,209	46,181	
Mahabubnagar	189	Nagarkurnool	Nagam Janardhan Reddy	TDP	70,624	Mohan Goud Vanga	INC	21,584	49,040	
Mahabubnagar	190	Kalwakurthy	Yadma Kista Reddy	IND	38,992	Gopal Reddy D	IND	37,733	1,259	
Mahabubnagar	191	Shadnagar (SC)	Bakkani Narsimulu	TDP	72,963	S. Balu	INC	27,141	45,822	
Mahabubnagar	192	Jadcherla	Satyanarayana	TDP	72,758	Pedda Narasappa	INC	18,979	53,779	
Mahabubnagar	193	Mahbubnagar	Chandra Sekhar	TDP	59,849	Puli Veeranna	INC	24,716	35,133	
Mahabubnagar	194	Wanaparthy	Ravula Chandra Sekar Reddy	TDP	62,789	G. Chinna Reddy	INC	40,807	21,982	
Mahabubnagar	195	Kollapur	K. Madhusudhan Rao	TDP	55,777	Kotha Ramchander Rao	INC	22,003	33,774	
Mahabubnagar	196	Alampur	Kothakota Prakasha Reddy	TDP	33,918	D. Vishnuvardhan Reddy	INC	31,954	1,964	
Mahabubnagar	197	Gadwal	Bharat Simha Reddy	IND	71,802	D. K. Samarasimha Reddy	IND	39,241	32,561	
Mahabubnagar	198	Amarchinta	K. Dayakar Reddy	TDP	70,470	K. Veera Reddy	INC	25,507	44,963	
Mahabubnagar	199	Makthal	Y. Yella Reddy	TDP	41,063	Nagu Rao	BJP	23,585	17,478	
Mahabubnagar	200	Kodangal	Nandaram Venkataiah	TDP	55,881	Gurunath Reddy	INC	39,438	16,443	
Ranga Reddy	201	Tandur	P. Mahender Reddy	TDP	41,135	M. Narayana Rao	INC	30,944	10,191	
Ranga Reddy	202	Vikarabad (SC)	A. Chandrasekhar	TDP	59,864	Begari Sanjeeva Rao	IND	31,971	27,893	
Ranga Reddy	203	Pargi	Koppula Harishwar Reddy	TDP	67,433	Kamatham Ram Reddy	INC	32,918	34,515	
Ranga Reddy	204	Chevella	P. Indra Reddy	TDP	85,437	P. Pandu	INC	20,834	64,603	
Ranga Reddy	205	Ibrahimpatnam (SC)	Kondigari Ramulu	CPI(M)	61,258	K. Satyanarayana	INC	31,358	29,900	
Hyderabad	206	Musheerabad	M. Kodanda Reddy	INC	32,859	Nayani Narasimha Reddy	JD	27,928	4,931	
Hyderabad	207	Himayatnagar	C. Krishna Yadav	TDP	27,778	Ale Narendra	BJP	27,711	67	
Hyderabad	208	Sanathnagar	Marri Shashidhar Reddy	INC	30,813	Sripati Rajeswar	TDP	24,651	6,162	
Hyderabad	209	Secunderabad	Talasani Srinivas Yadav	TDP	45,358	Mary Ravindranath	INC	24,897	20,461	
Hyderabad	210	Khairatabad	P. Janardhana Reddy	INC	99,695	B. Vijaya Kumar	TDP	69,682	30,013	
Hyderabad	211	Secunderabad Cantt. (SC)	G. Sayanna	TDP	47,603	D. B. Devender	INC	43,967	3,636	
Hyderabad	212	Malakpet	Malreddy Ranga Reddy	TDP	54,441	N. Indrasena Reddy	BJP	47,857	6,584	
Hyderabad	213	Asifnagar	Danam Nagender	INC	21,431	Mohammed Virasat Rasool Khan	AIMIM	19,465	1,966	
Hyderabad	214	Maharajgunj	P. Ramaswamy	BJP	14,206	M. Mukesh	INC	14,009	197	
Hyderabad	215	Karwan	Baddam Bal Reddy	BJP	60,958	Syed Sajjad	AIMIM	47,665	13,293	
Hyderabad	216	Yakutpura	Mumtaz Ahmed Khan	MBT	66,283	Syed Baqer Agha	AIMIM	39,575	8,657	
Hyderabad	217	Chandrayangutta	Md. Amanullah Khan	MBT	64,025	Yousuf Bin Abdul Khader	AIMIM	28,315	35,710	
Hyderabad	218	Charminar	Asaduddin Owaisi	AIMIM	62,714	Hussain Shaheed	MBT	22,170	40,544	
Ranga Reddy	219	Medchal	T. Devender Goud	TDP	118,743	Singireddy Uma Devi	INC	67,269	51,474	
Medak	220	Siddipet	K. Chandra Shakher Rao	TDP	64,645	Ananthula Madan Mohan	INC	37,538	27,107	
Medak	221	Dommat	Cheruku Muthyam Reddy	TDP	59,037	Ahmed Farook Hussain	INC	20,255	38,782	
Medak	222	Gajwel (SC)	G. Vijaya Rama Rao	TDP	52,234	J. Geetha	INC	32,942	19,292	
Medak	223	Narsapur	Chilumula Vittal Reddy	CPI	58,617	Chavoti Jagannathrao	INC	41,436	17,181	
Medak	224	Sangareddy	K. Sadasiva Reddy	TDP	93,271	P. Ramachandra Reddy	INC	35,721	57,550	
Medak	225	Zahirabad	C. Baganna	TDP	53,967	P. Narsimha Reddy	INC	18,997	34,970	
Medak	226	Narayankhed	M. Vijayapal Reddy	TDP	63,162	Patlola Kista Reddy	INC	33,829	21,818	
Medak	227	Medak	Karanam Ramachandra Rao	TDP	58,307	P. Narayan Reddy	INC	30,770	27,537	
Medak	228	Ramayampet	Devra Vasudeva Rao	TDP	57,749	Anthireddigari Vittal Reddy	INC	33,684	24,065	
Medak	229	Andole (SC)	Malyala Rajaiah	TDP	54,486	C. Damoder Rajanarsimha	INC	33,727	20,759	
Nizamabad	230	Balkonda	K. R. Suresh Reddy	INC	40,219	Baddam Narsa Reddy	TDP	34,356	5,863	
Nizamabad	231	Armur	Aleti Annapoorna	TDP	47,641	Bajireddy Goverdhan	IND	33,598	14,043	
Nizamabad	232	Kamareddy	Gampa Govardhan	TDP	73,123	Mohammed Ali Shabbeer	INC	32,086	41,037	
Nizamabad	233	Yellareddy	Neralla Anjaneyulu	TDP	45,302	Lingareddygari Kishan Reddy	IND	29,595	15,707	
Nizamabad	234	Jukkal (SC)	B. Pandari	TDP	54,435	S. Gangaram	INC	33,193	21,242	
Nizamabad	235	Banswada	Pocharam Srinivas Reddy	TDP	77,495	Srimathi Beena Devi	INC	20,023	57,472	
Nizamabad	236	Bodhan	Basheeruddin Babu Khan	TDP	50,666	T. Narsimha Reddy	INC	30,396	20,270	
Nizamabad	237	Nizamabad	Satish Pawar	TDP	53,639	D. Srinivas	INC	36,223	17,416	
Nizamabad	238	Dichpalli	Mandava Venkateshwara Rao	TDP	58,928	Maheshwar Goud	INC	28,972	29,956	
Adilabad	239	Mudhole	Bhosle Narayan Rao Patel	TDP	64,925	G. Gaddenna	INC	32,023	32,902	
Adilabad	240	Nirmal	Samudrala Venugopal Chary	TDP	58,526	P Narsa Reddy	INC	34,653	23,873	
Adilabad	241	Boath (ST)	Godam Nagesh	TDP	51,593	Kishan Chauhan	INC	10,520	41,073	
Adilabad	242	Adilabad	Chilkuri Waman Reddy	TDP	39,729	Padala Bhumanna	IND	34,455	5,274	
Adilabad	243	Khanapur (ST)	Ajmeera Govind Naik	TDP	56,400	Kotnak Bhim Rao	INC	24,031	32,369	
Adilabad	244	Asifabad (SC)	Gunda Mallesh	CPI	57,058	Dasari Narsaiah	INC	22,903	34,155	
Adilabad	245	Luxettipet	Gone Hanmanth Rao	TDP	78,572	Gone Venkatasrinivasa Rao	INC	45,261	33,311	
Adilabad	246	Sirpur	Palvai Purushotham Rao	IND	47,539	K.V. Narayana Rao	TDP	35,271	12,268	
Adilabad	247	Chennur (SC)	Boda Janardhan	TDP	72,520	Sothuku Sanjeeva Rao	INC	29,912	42,608	
Karimnagar	248	Manthani	Chandrupatla Ram Reddy	TDP	61,504	D Sripada Rao	INC	40,349	21,155	
Karimnagar	249	Peddapalle	Birudu Rajamallu	TDP	69,610	Geetla Mukunda Reddy	INC	29,933	39,677	
Karimnagar	250	Mydaram (SC)	Malem Mallesham	IND	82,940	Koppula Eshwar	TDP	54,012	15,319	
Karimnagar	251	Huzurabad	Enugala Peddi Reddy	TDP	57,727	Laxmikantha Rao Bopparaju	INC	38,436	19,291	
Karimnagar	252	Kamalapur	Muddasani Damodar Reddy	TDP	65,889	Kethiri Sai Reddy	INC	38,572	27,317	
Karimnagar	253	Indurthi	Chinna Mallaiah Deshini	CPI	34,268	Bomma Venkateshwar	INC	23,792	9,436	
Karimnagar	254	Karimnagar	Juvvadi Chandra Sekhar Rao	TDP	67,041	Velichala Jagapathi Rao	INC	44,476	22,565	
Karimnagar	255	Choppadandi	Nyalakonda Ramkishan Rao	TDP	56,287	Koduri Satyanarayana Goud	INC	30,600	25,687	
Karimnagar	256	Jagtial	L. Ramana	TDP	51,256	T. Jeevan Reddy	INC	45,610	5,646	
Karimnagar	257	Buggaram	Shikari Vishwanatham	TDP	51,599	Juvvadi Rathnakar Rao	INC	47,474	4,125	
Karimnagar	258	Metpalli	Chennamaneni Vidyasagar Rao	BJP	47,211	Komireddi Ramulu	INC	30,486	16,725	
Karimnagar	259	Sircilla	Chennamaneni Rajeshwar Rao	CPI	36,154	Regulapati Papa Rao	IND	31,637	4,517	
Karimnagar	260	Narella (SC)	Suddala Devaiah	TDP	65,201	Gotte Dhoopathi	INC	22,112	43,089	
Warangal	261	Cheriyal	Raja Reddy Nimma	TDP	44,606	Mandala Sree Ramulu	INC	31,650	12,956	
Warangal	262	Jangaon	Charagonda Raji Reddy	CPI(M)	60,140	Ponnala Lakshmaiah	INC	35,632	24,508	
Warangal	263	Chennur	Nemarugommula Yethi Raja Rao	TDP	77,024	M.Jagannadham	INC	31,655	45,369	
Warangal	264	Dornakal	Dharamsoth Redya Naik	INC	53,274	Nookala Naresh Reddy	IND	27,180	26,079	
Warangal	265	Mahbubabad	Bandi Pullaiah	CPI	58,797	Jannareddy Janardhan Reddy	INC	48,683	10,114	
Warangal	266	Narsampet	Revuri Prakasha Reddy	TDP	41,344	Omkar Maddikayala	IND	41,257	87	
Warangal	267	Waradhanapet	Errabelli Dayakar Rao	TDP	54,029	Errabelli Varada Rajeshwar Rao	INC	31,854	22,175	
Warangal	268	Ghanpur Station (SC)	Kadiyam Srihari	TDP	62,407	Arogyam B	INC	22,356	40,051	
Warangal	269	Warangal	Rameshbabu Donepudi	TDP	54,663	Donepudi Ramesh Babu	INC	38,224	16,439	
Warangal	270	Hanamkonda	Dasyam Pranay Bhasker	TDP	62,242	P. V. Ranga Rao	INC	46,551	15,691	
Warangal	271	Shyampet	Sirikonda Madusudhana Chary	TDP	36,924	Narasimha Reddy Madadi	INC	27,173	9,751	
Warangal	272	Parkal (SC)	Saraiah Potharaju	CPI	33,843	Sammaiah Bochu	INC	29,245	4,598	
Warangal	273	Mulug (ST)	Azmeera Chandulal	TDP	61,952	Jagan Naik Porika	INC	33,651	28,301	
Khammam	274	Bhadrachalam (ST)	Kunja Bojji	CPI(M)	71,768	Sode Bhadraiah	INC	32,503	39,265	
Khammam	275	Burgampahad (ST)	Kunja Biksham	CPI	56,946	Chanda Lingaiah	INC	37,132	19,814	
Khammam	276	Kothagudem	Koneru Nageswara Rao	TDP	67,104	Vanama Venkateswara Rao	INC	46,117	20,987	
Khammam	277	Sathupalli	Thummala Nageswara Rao	TDP	74,049	Prasada Rao Jalagam	INC	66,455	7,594	
Khammam	278	Madhira	Bodepudi Venkateswara Rao	CPI(M)	48,226	Seelam Sidda Reddy	INC	43,225	9,161	
Khammam	279	Palair (SC)	Sandra Venkata Veeraiah	CPI(M)	63,328	Sambhani Chandra Sekhar	INC	53,172	10,156	
Khammam	280	Khammam	Puvvada Nageswar Rao	CPI	68,744	Zaheer Ali Mohammad	INC	44,806	23,938	
Khammam	281	Shujatnagar	Mohammad Rajab Ali	CPI	50,735	Ramreddy Venkat Reddy	INC	48,952	1,783	
Khammam	282	Yellandu (ST)	Vooke Abbaiah	CPI	44,191	Gummadi Narsaiah	CPI(ML)L	38,116	6,075	
Nalgonda	283	Tungaturthi	Ramreddy Damoder Reddy	IND	31,477	Vardelli Buchi Ramulu	CPI(M)	30,449	1,028	
Nalgonda	284	Suryapet (SC)	Aakarapu Sudarshan	TDP	60,913	Jannapala Yellaiah	INC	35,815	25,098	
Nalgonda	285	Kodad	Venepalli Chendar Rao	TDP	71,648	N. Uttam Kumar Reddy	INC	62,499	9,149	
Nalgonda	286	Miryalguda	Julakanti Ranga Reddy	CPI(M)	92,300	Vijaya Simhareddy Tippana	INC	72,207	20,093	
Nalgonda	287	Chalakurthi	Gundeboina Rammurthy	TDP	64,851	Kunduru Jana Reddy	INC	62,230	2,621	
Nalgonda	288	Nakrekal	Narra Raghava Reddy	CPI(M)	59,216	Neti Vidyasagar	IND	23,110	36,106	
Nalgonda	289	Nalgonda	Nandyala Narasimha Reddy	CPI(M)	63,646	Chakilam Srinivas Rao	INC	34,483	29,163	
Nalgonda	290	Ramannapet	Gurram Yadagiri Reddy	CPI	45,750	Uppunuthula Purushotham Reddy	INC	44,759	991	
Nalgonda	291	Alair (SC)	Motkupalli Narasimhulu	TDP	69,172	Kududula Nagesh	INC	30,197	38,975	
Nalgonda	292	Bhongir	Alimineti Madhava Reddy	TDP	77,265	Madugula Narsa Reddy	INC	33,746	43,519	
Nalgonda	293	Mungode	Ujjini Narayana Rao	CPI	55,209	Palvai Govardhan Reddy	IND	23,655	31,554	
Nalgonda	294	Deverkonda (ST)	Moodu Badhu Chowhan	CPI	56,630	Dheeravath Raghya Naik	INC	33,557	23,073 '	

== Bypolls ==
S.No	Assembly Constituency		Winner			Runner-up			Margin
S.No	No.	Name	Candidate	Party	Votes	Candidate	Party	Votes	Margin
1	3	Tekkali	Hanumanthu Appayya Dora	Telugu Desam Party	48,050	Peerupalli V. Rao	Indian National Congress	25,853	22,197
2	4	Harishchandrapuram	Kinjarapu Atchannaidu	Telugu Desam Party	62,918	Sampathirao Raghav Rao	Indian National Congress	30,712	32,206
3	6	Pathapatnam	Lakshmi Parvathi	NTR Telugu Desam Party (Lakshmi Parvathi)	43,558	Kalamata Venemma	Telugu Desam Party	29,410	14,148
4	36	Narsipatnam	Vechalapu Sri Ramamurthy	Telugu Desam Party	61,740	Rajasagi Krishnamurthy Raju	Indian National Congress	49,413	12,057
5	53	Mummidivaram	Chelli Vivekananda	Telugu Desam Party	49,852	Pinipe Viswarup	Indian National Congress	32,074	17,778
6	53	Mummidivaram	G. M. C. Balayogi	Telugu Desam Party	46,562	Gollapalli Surya Rao	Indian National Congress	32,066	14,496
7	57	Nagaram	Pulaparty Narayana Murty	Telugu Desam Party	32,539	Bhathula Venkata Rao	Indian National Congress	22,058	10,481
8	59	Narasapuram	Kothapalli Janaki Ram	Telugu Desam Party	59,875	Parakala Prabhakar	Indian National Congress	54,198	5,677
9	62	Bhimavaram	Penumatsa Venkata Narasimha Raju	Telugu Desam Party	51,478	K.K.K. Bhupathiraju	Indian National Congress	44,823	6,655
10	66	Attili	Dandu Sivarama Raju	Telugu Desam Party	69,389	Addala Swamy Naidu	Indian National Congress	23,823	45,566
11	113	Martur	Gottipati Narasimha Rao (Narasaiah)	Telugu Desam Party	1,09,993	Nannapaneni Balamma	Indian National Congress	7,450	1,02,543
12	121	Darsi	Narapusetty Papa Rao	Telugu Desam Party	63,432	Sanikommu Pitchi Reddy	Indian National Congress	55,031	8,401
13	143	Punganur	N. Amarnath Reddy	Telugu Desam Party	69,820	M Kamal	Indian National Congress	39,786	30,034
14	164	Hindupur	Nandamuri Harikrishna	Telugu Desam Party	83,202	R Lakshminarayana Reddy	Indian National Congress	24,992	58,210
15	166	Penukonda	Paritala Ravindra	Telugu Desam Party	84,275	Sane Venkata Ramana Reddy	Indian National Congress	24,265	60,010
16	181	Dhone	K. E. Prabhakar	Telugu Desam Party	64,459	Kotla Hari Chakrapani Reddy	Indian National Congress	35,881	28,578
17	183	Allagadda	Bhuma Shobha Nagi Reddy	Telugu Desam Party	75,345	Erigela Ramapulla Reddy	Indian National Congress	28,184	47,161
18	192	Jadcherla	Marati Chandra Shekar	Telugu Desam Party	76,063	Gunna Sudhakar Reddy	Indian National Congress	28,328	47,735
19	200	Kodangal	Nandaram Nididoddi Suryanarayana	Telugu Desam Party	51,949	Gurunath Reddy	Indian National Congress	45,285	6,664
20	229	Andole	Babu Mohan	Telugu Desam Party	54,963	Damodar Raja Narasimha	Indian National Congress	44,409	10,554
21	240	Nirmal	Nalla Indrakaran Reddy	Telugu Desam Party	46,559	Argula Kamaladhar	Indian National Congress	34,632	11,927
22	256	Jagtial	T. Jeevan Reddy	Indian National Congress	83,291	Bandari Venugopal	Telugu Desam Party	29,381	53,910
22	258	Metpalli	Kommireddy Jyothi Devi	Indian National Congress	34,596	Thummala Venkata Ramana Reddy	Bharatiya Janata Party	30,711	3,885
24	270	Hanamkonda	P. V. Ranga Rao	Indian National Congress	46,060	Marthineni Dharma Rao	Bharatiya Janata Party	43,100	2,960
25	273	Mulug	Cherpa Bhojarao	Telugu Desam Party	43,865	Porika Jagan Naik	Indian National Congress	30,316	13,549
26	273	Madhira	Katta Venkatanarasaiah	Communist Party of India (Marxist)	48,914	Seelam Siddha Reddy	Indian National Congress	44,894	4,020'
27	281	Shujathnagar	Ramreddy Venkat Reddy	Indian National Congress	67,184	T.V. Chowdhary	Communist Party of India	48,117	19,067
