= Dasyam Vinay Bhasker =

Indian politician

Dasyam Vinay Bhaskar
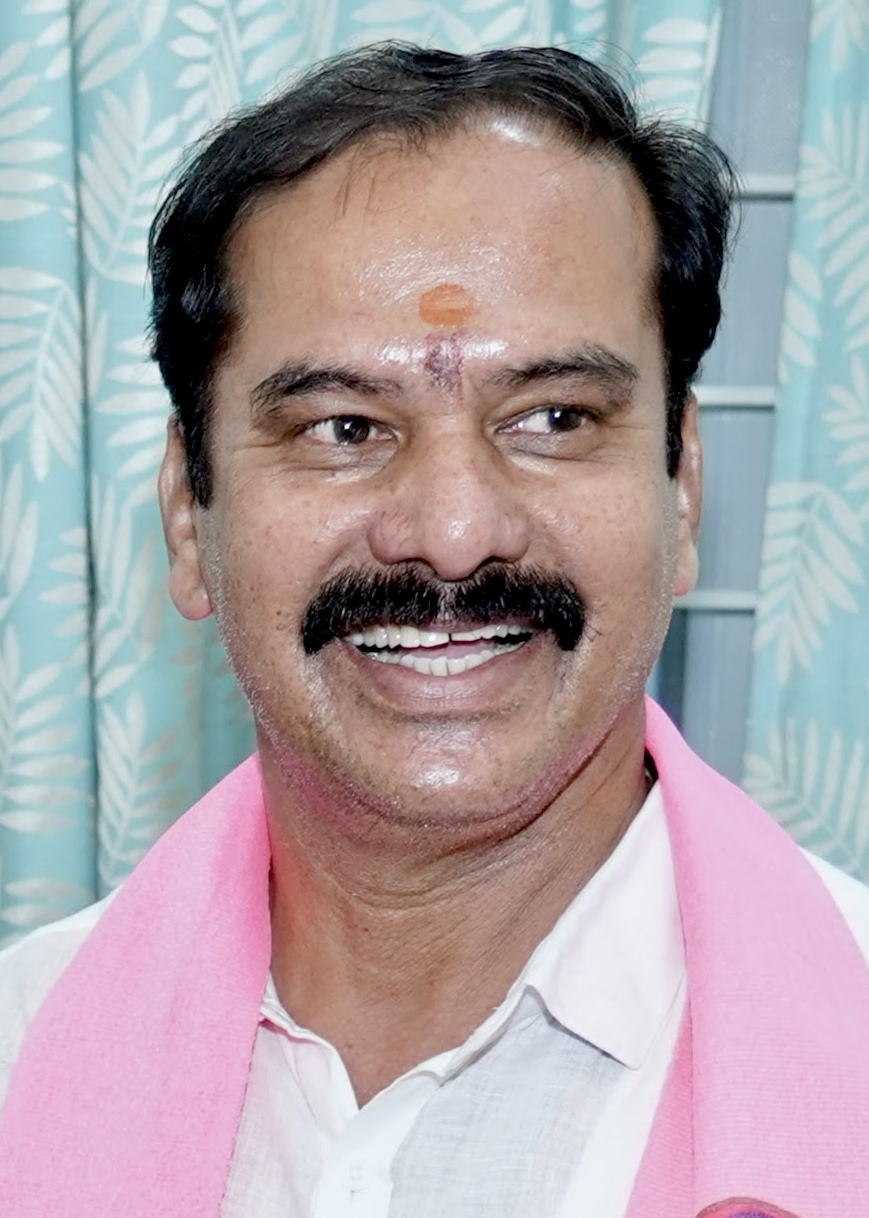

Member Of Legislative Assembly
- Constituency: Warangal West (Assembly constituency)

Government Chief Whip of Telangana State Legislative Assembly
- In office 8 September 2019 – Incumbent

Personal details
- Born: 22 November 1964 (age 61) Warangal, Telangana
- Party: Telangana Rashtra Samithi

Dasyam Vinay Bhaskar (Telugu: డి వినయ భాస్కేర్) (born 22 November 1964) is an Indian politician and Member of Legislative Assembly in Telangana representing Telangana Rashtra Samithi (T.R.S.) and Government Chief Whip of Telangana State Legislative Assembly. He represents the Warangal West assembly constituency. He was also the Parliamentary Secretary in-charge of Chief Minister's Office (CMO) for TRS party during 2015.

== Early life ==
Vinay Bhaskar was born in Warangal district, Andhra Pradesh (now Telangana), India. He is the younger brother of Dasyam Pranay Bhasker, who was a former cabinet minister in the TDP government of N. T. Rama Rao. After the passing of Pranay Bhasker, Vinay Bhaskar followed him into politics. His other brother, the late Uday Bhaskar, is the father of Telugu film director and actor Tharun Bhascker.

He completed his 12th from St. Joseph Jr. College, Hyderabad and graduated in Bachelor of Arts in political science from Dr. BR Ambedkar Open University, Hyderabad.

== Career ==
In 2004, Vinay Bhaskar contested as an Independent candidate from the Hanamkonda Assembly constituency and lost to Mandadi Satyanarayana Reddy of the then Telangana Rashtra Samithi (TRS) party after coming second. Later, he joined TRS on the invitation of the party president, KCR, and was elected as a corporator, which became the first elected representation for him. In 2009, Vinay Bhaskar was elected to Warangal West constituency in Warangal district representing TRS. He won the seat again in the 2011 by-election. He won the seat again in 2014 after Telangana was granted statehood. In 2018, Vinay Bhaskar won from Warangal West for the second time.

In January 2015, he was appointed the Parliamentary Secretary in-charge of Chief Minister's Office (CMO) by the Chief Minister of Telangana, KCR. On 8 September 2019, Vinay Bhaskar was appointed the Government Chief Whip for Telangana Legislative assembly.

== Elections contested ==
Duration	Constituency	Party	Result	Votes polled	Vote share %	Margin	Opposition Candidate	Opp.Party	Notes
1999	Hanamkonda	Ind	Lost	33,146	25.27%	-19,426	Dharma Rao Marthineni	TDP-BJP	Came as 2nd Runner, 1st Runner being Incumbent P. V. Ranga Rao of INC
2004	Hanamkonda	Ind	Lost	57,582	37.62%	-3009	Mandadi Satyanarayana Reddy	TRS	
2009-10	Warangal West	TRS	Won	45,807	39.64%	6,684	Kondapalli Dayasagar Rao	INC	Term cut short when TRS MLA's resigned for Telangana Statehood demand.
2010-14(By Polls)	Warangal West	TRS	Won	88,449	74.85%	67,524	Kondapalli Dayasagar Rao	INC	2010 By-polls held for vacant seats due to Telangana Statehood demand protests.
2014-2018	Warangal West	TRS	Won	82,496	59.31%	56,30,4	Swarna Errabelli	INC	
2018-2023	Warangal West	TRS	Won	81,006	56.78%	36,451	Revuri Prakash Reddy	TDP	
2023	Warangal West	TRS	Lost	57,318	34.32%	-15,331	Naini Rajender Reddy	INC	
