= Komarru =

Komarru pedda komarru
- Village
- Interactive map of Komarru
- Location in Andhra Pradesh, India Komarru (India)
- Coordinates: 16.7101°N 81.5939°E
- Country: India
- State: Andhra Pradesh
- District: Eluru

Languages
  - Official: Telugu
- Time zone: UTC+5:30 (IST)

Komarru is a small village in Mudinepalli mandal in the state of Andhra Pradesh in India. The main profession is agriculture and aquaculture.
