= Charminar Assembly constituency =

Constituency of the Telangana legislative assembly in India

Coordinates: 17.362°N 78.475°E

Charminar
- Constituency No. 66 for the Telangana Legislative Assembly
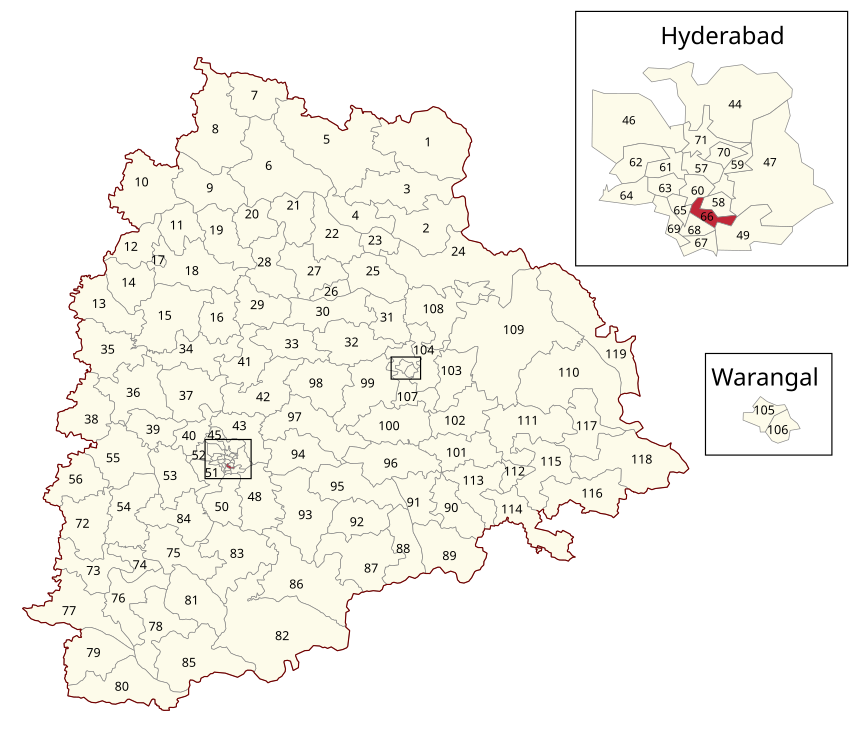
- Location of Charminar Assembly constituency within Telangana

Constituency details
- Country: India
- Region: South India
- State: Telangana
- District: Hyderabad
- Lok Sabha constituency: Hyderabad
- Established: 1967
- Total electors: 1,96,116
- Reservation: None

Member of Legislative Assembly
- 3rd Telangana Legislative Assembly
- Incumbent Mir Zulfeqar Ali
- Party: AIMIM
- Elected year: 2023

Charminar Assembly constituency is a constituency of Telangana Legislative Assembly, India. It is one of the 26 constituencies of CURE limits, a strategic zone created by Government of Telangana. It is part of Hyderabad Lok Sabha constituency.

Syed Pasha Quadri won the assembly election from Charminar in 2014.

== Extent of the constituency ==
The Assembly Constituency presently comprises the following neighbourhoods:

Neighbourhood
Charminar
Shah Ali Banda
Purana pul
Laad Bazaar
Moghalpura
Khilwat
Chaderghat (part)
Lal Darwaza (part)

== Members of Legislative Assembly ==
Election	Member	Political party
United Andhra Pradesh
1967	Sultan Salahuddin Owaisi	Independent
1972	Syed Hassan	Independent
1978	Sultan Salahuddin Owaisi	Independent
1983	Sultan Salahuddin Owaisi	Independent
1985	Mohd. Mukkarramuddin	Independent
1989	Vizarat Rasool Khan	All India Majlis-e-Ittehadul Muslimeen
1994	Asaduddin Owaisi	All India Majlis-e-Ittehadul Muslimeen
1999	Asaduddin Owaisi	All India Majlis-e-Ittehadul Muslimeen
2004	Syed Ahmed Pasha Quadri	All India Majlis-e-Ittehadul Muslimeen
2009	Syed Ahmed Pasha Quadri	All India Majlis-e-Ittehadul Muslimeen
Telangana
2014	Syed Ahmed Pasha Quadri	All India Majlis-e-Ittehadul Muslimeen
2018	Mumtaz Ahmed Khan	All India Majlis-e-Ittehadul Muslimeen
2023	Mir Zulfeqar Ali	All India Majlis-e-Ittehadul Muslimeen

== Election results ==
Vote share of Winning candidates
2023	50.05%
2018	53.36%
2014	57.11%
2009	48.61%
2004	73.53%
1999	66.15%
1994	48.99%
1989	75.37%
1985	69.01%
1983	64.05%
1978	51.98%
1972	42.49%
1967	50.30%

=== 2023 ===
2023 Telangana Legislative Assembly election: Charminar
Party	Candidate	Votes	%	±%
AIMIM	Mir Zulfeqar Ali	49,103	50.05	
BJP	Megha Rani Agarwal	26,250	26.76	
INC	Mohammed Mujeebullah Shareef	10,899	11.11	
BRS	Mohammed Salauddin Lodhi	8,874	9.05	
NOTA	None of the Above	837	0.85	
IND	4 Independent Candidates	529	0.54	
OTH	6 Other Party Candidates	1,611	1.64	
Majority		22,853	23.29	
Turnout				
AIMIM hold		Swing		

=== 2018 ===
2018 Telangana Legislative Assembly election: Charminar
Party	Candidate	Votes	%	±%
AIMIM	Mumtaz Ahmed Khan	53,808	53.36	
BJP	T. Uma Mahendra	21,222	21.04	
INC	Mohammed Ghouse	16,899	16.76	
TRS	Mohammed Salahuddin Lodhi	6,223	6.17	
NOTA	None of the Above	614	0.61	
IND	8 Independent Candidates	1,627	1.61	
OTH	4 Other Party Candidates	456	0.45	
Majority		32,586	32.32	
Turnout		100,849	50.32	
AIMIM hold		Swing		

=== 2014 ===
2014 Telangana Legislative Assembly election: Charminar
Party	Candidate	Votes	%	±%
AIMIM	Syed Ahmed Pasha Quadri	62,941	57.11	
TDP	M. A. Basith	26,326	23.89	
TRS	Mir Inayath Ali Baqri	8,275	7.51	
INC	K. Venkatesh	5,598	5.08	
MBT	Majid Ahmed Khan	2,244	2.04	
AAP	Mir Mohammed Ali	1,045	0.95	
NOTA	None of the Above	958	0.87	
YSRCP	T. Srinivasa Rao	681	0.62	
IND	3 Independent Candidates	1,257	1.14	
OTH	4 Other Party Candidates	887	0.80	
Majority		36,615	33.22	
Turnout		110,212	56.20	
AIMIM hold		Swing		

=== 2009 ===
2009 Andhra Pradesh Legislative Assembly election: Charminar
Party	Candidate	Votes	%	±%
AIMIM	Syed Ahmed Pasha Quadri	43,725	48.61	
TDP	Ali Bin Ibrahim Masqati	33,030	36.72	
INC	B. Buchi Das	5,697	6.33	
BJP	Shobha Rani	4,247	4.72	
PRP	Mir Yousuf Ali	1,662	1.85	
TPPP (Note: Trilinga Praja Pragati Party)	P. Gopal	514	0.57	
PPOI (Note: Pyramid Party of India)	S. Satyavathi	366	0.41	
IND	Subhash Chandra Pandey	292	0.32	
IND	A. Ganpath Rao	228	0.25	
IND	Mohd. Qadeer Ali	117	0.13	
IND	Mohd. Hashmath Ali	77	0.09	
Majority		10,695	11.89	
Turnout		89,955	53.89	
AIMIM hold		Swing		

=== 2004 ===
2004 Andhra Pradesh Legislative Assembly election: Charminar
Party	Candidate	Votes	%	±%
AIMIM	Syed Ahmed Pasha Quadri	130,879	73.53	
TDP	Tayyaba Tasleem	22,958	12.90	
INC	Y. Amarendhar Reddy	16,133	9.06	
MBT	Mohammed Adam Malik	4,639	2.61	
BSP	Vanamala Shiv Charan	1,277	0.72	
IND	M. Madhusudhan	1,123	0.63	
ABJS	Rajesh Sharma	999	0.56	
Majority		107,921	60.63	
Turnout		178,008		
AIMIM hold		Swing		

=== 1999 ===
1999 Andhra Pradesh Legislative Assembly election: Charminar
Party	Candidate	Votes	%	±%
AIMIM	Asaduddin Owaisi	126,844	66.15	
TDP	Syed Shah Noorul Haq Quadri	33,339	17.39	
MBT	Mushtaq Hussain	14,205	7.41	
INC	Manoj Pershad	13,343	6.96	
ATDP	M. Narsing Rao	2,283	1.19	
IND	Robert Raj	1,742	0.91	
Majority		93,505	48.76	
Turnout		191,758	65.72	
AIMIM hold		Swing		

=== 1994 ===
1994 Andhra Pradesh Legislative Assembly election: Charminar
Party	Candidate	Votes	%	±%
AIMIM	Asaduddin Owaisi	62,714	48.99	
MBT	Hussain Shaheed	22,170	17.32	
TDP	P. Babu Rao	19,765	15.44	
BJP	Hari Kishan Gupta	13,195	10.31	
INC	Syed Yousuf Hashmi	4,209	3.29	
APNPP (Note: Andhra Pradesh Navodaya Praja Party)	Mohd. Hameedul Rahiman	3,304	2.58	
BSP	Md. Nasser Khan	399	0.31	
JP	Ramchandra Agarwal	124	0.10	
IND	11 Independent Candidates	2,136	1.68	
Majority		40,544	31.67	
Turnout		130,455	58.18	
AIMIM hold		Swing		

=== 1989 ===
1989 Andhra Pradesh Legislative Assembly election: Charminar
Party	Candidate	Votes	%	±%
AIMIM	Virasat Rasool Khan	108,365	75.37	
INC	Manoj Pershad	22,884	15.92	
TDP	Mir Yousuf Ali	11,644	8.10	
IND	Mohd. Afzal Rasheed	402	0.28	
IND	Mirza Habeeb Baig	278	0.19	
IND	Mohd. Ghouse	139	0.10	
IND	Brij Mohan Vyas	62	0.04	
Majority		85,481	59.45	
Turnout		147,106	72.33	
Swing to AIMIM from Independent		Swing		

=== 1985 ===
1985 Andhra Pradesh Legislative Assembly election: Charminar
Party	Candidate	Votes	%	±%
IND	Mohd. Mukkarramuddin	62,676	69.01	
IND	Jagat Singh	17,024	18.74	
TDP	Mohd. Amanullah Khan	5,085	5.60	
INC	Mir Rahimuddin	3,301	3.63	
IND	Mir Mohd. Ali Khan	1,150	1.27	
IND	K. Sesha Chari	875	0.96	
IND	Mohd. Azam	251	0.28	
IND	Syed Mohd. Pasha Quadri	84	0.09	
IND	Briz Mohan Vyas	77	0.08	
IND	M. A. Basith	66	0.07	
IND	Babu Lal Gupta	66	0.07	
IND	Damodhar Reddy	57	0.06	
IND	A. Ramaswamy	57	0.06	
IND	Ved Swaroop Sharma	55	0.06	
Majority		45,652	50.27	
Turnout		91,769	65.48	
Independent hold		Swing		

=== 1983 ===
1983 Andhra Pradesh Legislative Assembly election: Charminar
Party	Candidate	Votes	%	±%
IND	Sultan Salahuddin Owaisi	50,724	64.05	
BJP	C. Ashok Kumar	18,218	23.01	
INC	Bala Pochaiah	6,704	8.47	
IND	Ahmed Abdul Waheed	3,131	3.95	
IND	Rajaram Sastry Pandit	164	0.21	
IND	Babulal Gupta	161	0.20	
IND	R. M. Manohar	89	0.11	
Majority		32,506	41.04	
Turnout		80,966	65.22	
Independent hold		Swing		

=== 1978 ===
1977 Indian general election: Charminar
Party	Candidate	Votes	%	±%
IND	Sultan Salahuddin Owaisi	30,328	51.98	
JP	Ahmed Hussain	10,546	18.07	
INC(I)	Md. Ahmed Ali	9,606	16.46	
INC	Banarsi Lal Gupta	5,160	8.84	
IND	Md. Osman Shahedd	1,956	3.35	
IND	Mohd. Osman	662	1.13	
IND	Ramchander Agarwal	93	0.16	
Majority		19,782	33.90	
Turnout		59,566	62.96	
Independent hold		Swing		

=== 1972 ===
1971 Indian general election: Charminar
Party	Candidate	Votes	%	±%
IND	Syed Hassan	15,341	42.49	
STS (Note: Sampurna Telangana Praja Samithi)	S. Raghuveer Rao	5,591	15.48	
INC	Nawah Tahar Ali Khan	5,368	14.87	
IND	Laik Ali Khan	5,169	14.32	
IND	B. Kishen	4,638	12.85	
Majority		9,750	27.00	
Turnout		37,009	52.41	
Independent hold		Swing		

=== 1967 ===
1967 Indian general election: Charminar
Party	Candidate	Votes	%	±%
IND	Sultan Salahuddin Owaisi	17,902	50.30	
ABJS	C. L. Meghraj	10,402	29.23	
INC	M. A. A. Khan	6,732	18.92	
SSP	O. P. Nirmal	333	0.94	
IND	S. A. M. Hussain	220	0.62	
Majority		7,500	21.07	
Turnout		36,775	58.40	
Independent win (new seat)				

== See also ==
- Charminar
- List of constituencies of Telangana Legislative Assembly
