= Chintala =

Chintala (Telugu: చింతల) or Chinthala is a Telugu surname. Notable people with the surname include:

- Chintala Ramachandra Reddy (born 1952), Indian politician
- Chintala Ramachandra Reddy (born 1964), Indian politician
- Chintala Venkat Reddy (born 1950), Indian organic farmer
