= Naini Rajender Reddy =

Indian politician

Naini Rajender Reddy (born 1969) is an Indian politician from Telangana state. He is an MLA from Warangal West Assembly constituency in Hanamkonda district. He represents Indian National Congress Party and won the 2023 Telangana Legislative Assembly election.

== Early life and education ==
Reddy is from Warangal. He is born to Naini Narender Reddy. He completed his Intermediate i 1987 at Government Junior College, Hanumakonda.

== Career ==
Reddy started as a NSUI District General secretary and president 1988- 1998. From 1998-2005 worked as youth Congress District president. Reddy was the best youth president twice and got award from former CM YS. Rajashekar Reddy in combined state Andhrapradesh . He worked as district library chairman from 2005-2016. District Congress Committee president in 2015. Reddy won from Warangal West Assembly constituency representing Indian National Congress in the 2023 Telangana Legislative Assembly election. He polled 72,649 votes, and defeated his nearest rival Dasyam Vinay Bhasker of Bharath Rashtra Samithi by a margin of 15,331 votes. Reddy is the most senior leader in Telangana Congress.

He was appointed as Telangana Pradesh Congress Committee (TPCC) Vice President on 9 June 2025.
