= Yerneni Sita Devi =

Indian politician (1950–2024)

Member of Legislative Assembly Andhra Pradesh
- In office 1985–1989, 1994–1999
- Preceded by: Pinnamaneni Koteswara Rao
- Succeeded by: Pinnamaneni Venkateswara Rao
- Constituency: Mudinepalli

Personal details
- Born: 1950 Koduru
- Died: 28 May 2024 (aged 74) Hyderabad
- Party: Telugu Desam Party
- Children: 3

Yerneni Sita Devi (1950 – 28 May 2024) was an Indian politician from Andhra Pradesh. She was a former two time member of the Andhra Pradesh Legislative Assembly from Mudinepalli Assembly constituency in Krishna district representing Telugu Desam Party. She served as a Minister for Education in the Telugu Desam government of NT Rama Rao in 1988.

Devi was born in Koduru village in Kaikaluru mandal in the erstwhile Krishna district, presently in Eluru district. Her husband was Nagendranath.

== Career ==
Devi entered politics after the call given late NT Rama Rao. She contested the 1983 election but lost. She became an MLA for the first time winning the 1985 Andhra Pradesh Legislative Assembly election from Mudinepalli Assembly constituency representing Telugu Desam Party. She regained the seat for Telugu Desam winning the 1994 Assembly election. Later, she lost the 1999 and 2004 elections.

Devi died of heart attack in Hyderabad on 28 May 2024. She was 74 and is survived by two sons and a daughter.
