= Hanamkonda Assembly constituency =

Former Assembly constituency in Andhra Pradesh, India

Coordinates: 18.01°N 79.55°E

Hanamkonda
- Former constituency No. 270 for the Andhra Pradesh Legislative Assembly

Constituency details
- Country: India
- Region: South India
- State: Andhra Pradesh
- District: Warangal
- Lok Sabha constituency: Warangal
- Established: First:1951; Second:1978
- Abolished: First:1956; Second:2008
- Reservation: None

Hanamkonda is a former assembly constituency of Andhra Pradesh Legislative Assembly in Telangana state of India, then part of United Andhra Pradesh. It was created for first time in 1951 and abbolished in 1956 delimitation.This constituency was created second time in 1978 originally from the earlier united Warangal Assembly constituency and existed between 1978 until the 2008 delimitation. During the 2008 delimitation exercise the constituency was bifurcated into Warangal West and Warangal East.

== Members of the Legislative Assembly ==
=== Hyderabad ===
Year	Con. No.	Member	Party
1952	123	Pendyal Raghava Rao	People's Democratic Front

=== Andhra Pradesh ===
Year	Member	Party
1978	T. Hayagriva Chary	Indian National Congress (Indira)
1983	Sangam Reddy Satyanarayana	Telugu Desam Party
1985	V. Venkateswar Rao	Telugu Desam Party
1989	P. V. Ranga Rao	Indian National Congress
1994	Dasyam Pranay Bhasker	Telugu Desam Party
1999	Dharma Rao Marthineni	Bharatiya Janata Party
2004	Mandadi Satyanarayana Reddy	Telangana Rashtra Samithi

== Election results ==
=== 2004 ===
2004 Andhra Pradesh Legislative Assembly election : Hanamkonda
Party	Candidate	Votes	%	±%
TRS	Mandadi Satyanarayana Reddy	60,730	39.77%	New
Independent	Dasyam Pranay Bhasker	57,582	37.71%	New
BJP	Dharma Rao Marthineni	27,820	18.22%	▼21.86
JP	Gade Inna Reddy	2,335	1.53%	New
Independent	Anjaneya Sastry Kompalli	1,625	1.06%	New
BSP	Prof. Chintha Suvartha	1,229	0.80%	New
Independent	Nanne Lakshman Meru	987	0.65%	New
Margin of victory		3,148	2.06%	▼8.68
Turnout		152,744	59.17%	▲0.16
Total valid votes		152,711		
Rejected ballots		33	0.02%	▼4.23
Registered electors		258,165		▲11.20
BRS gain from BJP		Swing	▼0.31	

=== 1999 ===
1999 Andhra Pradesh Legislative Assembly election : Hanamkonda
Party	Candidate	Votes	%	±%
BJP	Dharma Rao Marthineni	52,572	40.08%	▲35.97
INC	Dr. P. V. Ranga Rao	38,488	29.34%	▼10.87
Independent	Dasyam Pranay Bhasker	33,146	25.27%	New
Anna Telugu Desam Party	Gujjari Pratap	1,950	1.49%	New
Independent	Balaboina Upender	963	0.73%	New
Independent	Burra Ramulu	893	0.68%	New
Margin of victory		14,084	10.74%	▼2.81
Turnout		136,998	59.01%	
Total valid votes		131,174		
Rejected ballots		5,824	4.25%	▲2.52
Registered electors		232,163		▲16.30
BJP gain from TDP		Swing	▼13.69	

=== 1994 ===
1994 Andhra Pradesh Legislative Assembly election : Hanamkonda
Party	Candidate	Votes	%	±%
TDP	Dasyam Pranay Bhasker	62,242	53.77%	▲18.34
INC	Dr. P. V. Ranga Rao	46,551	40.21%	▼18.32
BJP	Dharma Rao Marthineni	4,754	4.11%	New
Margin of victory		15,691	13.55%	▼9.55
Turnout		117,801	59.01%	▼2.32
Total valid votes		115,759		
Rejected ballots		2,042	1.73%	▼2.78
Registered electors		199,628		▲15.69
TDP gain from INC		Swing	▼4.76	

=== 1989 ===
1989 Andhra Pradesh Legislative Assembly election : Hanamkonda
Party	Candidate	Votes	%	±%
INC	P. V. Ranga Rao	59,153	58.53%	▲24.37
TDP	Dasyam Pranay Bhasker	35,810	35.43%	▼10.19
Independent	Venkateshawar Rao Velegala	2,478	2.45%	New
Independent	Mohd. Khaleeluddin	1,984	1.96%	New
Independent	Dumpeti Laxman	670	0.66%	New
Margin of victory		23,343	23.10%	▲11.63
Turnout		105,831	61.33%	▲9.53
Total valid votes		101,059		
Rejected ballots		4,772	4.51%	▲2.75
Registered electors		172,560		▲28.15
INC gain from TDP		Swing	▲12.91	

=== 1985 ===
1985 Andhra Pradesh Legislative Assembly election : Hanamkonda
Party	Candidate	Votes	%	±%
TDP	Venkateswar Rao. V	31,263	45.62%	New
INC	Gandavarapu Prasad Rao	23,404	34.16%	▲1.92
Independent	Kasarla Veera Reddy	10,028	14.63%	New
Independent	Mattepelli Venkataiah	1,581	2.31%	New
Independent	Kandukuri Kanthaiah	1,326	1.94%	New
Margin of victory		7,859	11.47%	▼15.17
Turnout		69,748	51.80%	▼3.89
Total valid votes		68,522		
Rejected ballots		1,226	1.76%	▼0.79
Registered electors		134,656		▲10.01
TDP gain from Independent		Swing	▼13.26	

=== 1983 ===
1983 Andhra Pradesh Legislative Assembly election : Hanamkonda
Party	Candidate	Votes	%	±%
Independent	Sangam Reddy Satyanarayana	39,112	58.88%	New
INC	Tiruvarangam Haygrivachary	21,415	32.24%	▲28.30
BJP	Mohammed Yousufuddin	2,706	4.07%	New
Independent	Yakarapu Shantha Kumari	2,191	3.30%	New
LKD	Shankraiah Sayam	632	0.95%	New
Margin of victory		17,697	26.64%	▲7.63
Turnout		68,167	55.69%	▼12.62
Total valid votes		66,432		
Rejected ballots		1,735	2.55%	▼1.01
Registered electors		122,398		▲17.74
Independent gain from INC(I)		Swing	▲10.98	

=== 1978 ===
1978 Andhra Pradesh Legislative Assembly election : Hanamkonda
Party	Candidate	Votes	%	±%
INC(I)	T. Hayagriva Chary	32,806	47.90%	New
JP	P. Uma Reddy	19,786	28.89%	New
Independent	Gujjari Ved Prakash	7,008	10.23%	New
INC	P. Sunder Raj Naidu	2,697	3.94%	New
Independent	Mohd. Sajid Pasha	2,568	3.75%	New
Independent	L. Gandiah	939	1.37%	New
Independent	Narsimha Reddy Kesireddy	829	1.21%	New
Independent	Sheelam Rajalingam	766	1.12%	New
Independent	Moluguri Prabhakar Rao	603	0.88%	New
Margin of victory		13,020	19.01%	
Turnout		71,012	68.31%	
Total valid votes		68,483		
Rejected ballots		2,529	3.56%	
Registered electors		103,952		
INC(I) win (new seat)				

=== 1952 ===
1952 Hyderabad Legislative Assembly election : Hanamkonda
Party	Candidate	Votes	%	±%
PDF	Pendyal Raghava Rao	17,281	52.89	New
INC	Bethi Keshava Reddy	10,552	32.30	New
Independent	Parsi Eshwariah	4,839	14.81	New
Margin of victory		6,729	20.60	
Turnout		32,672	57.36	
Registered electors		56,964		
PDF win (new seat)				
