= Warangal West Assembly constituency =

Constituency of the Telangana legislative assembly in India

Coordinates: 17.99°N 79.57°E

Warangal West
- Constituency No. 105 for the Telangana Legislative Assembly
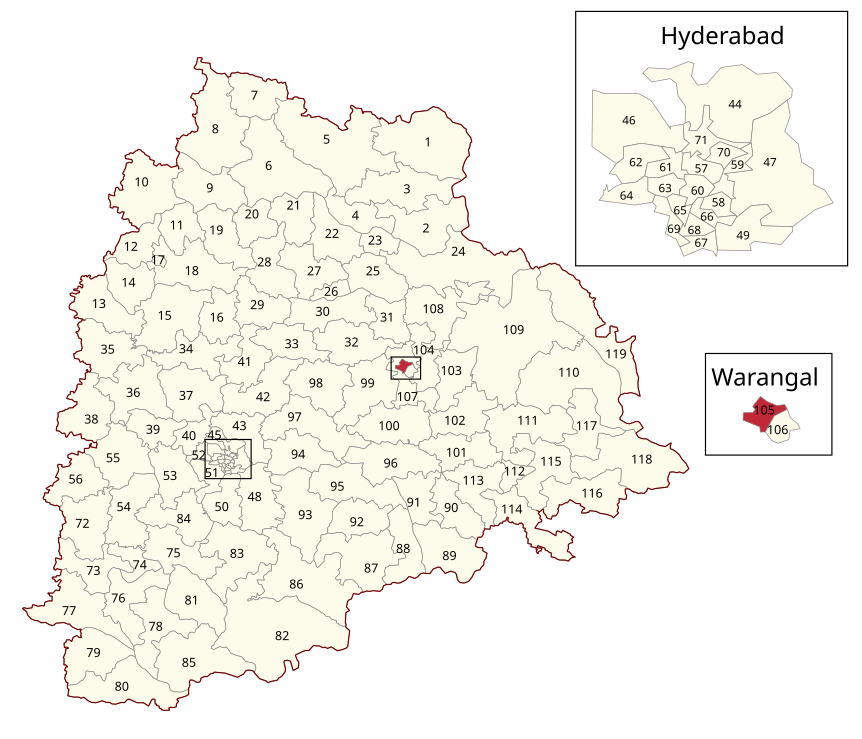
- Location of Warangal West Assembly constituency within Telangana

Constituency details
- Country: India
- Region: South India
- State: Telangana
- District: Warangal
- Lok Sabha constituency: Warangal
- Established: 2008
- Total electors: 2,33,905
- Reservation: None

Member of Legislative Assembly
- 3rd Telangana Legislative Assembly
- Incumbent Naini Rajender Reddy
- Party: INC

Warangal West Assembly constituency is a constituency of Telangana Legislative Assembly, India formed after the 2008 delimitation of the earlier Hanamkonda Assembly constituency. It is one of 12 constituencies in Warangal district. It is one of the two constituencies in the City of Warangal and part of Warangal Lok Sabha constituency

Naini Rajender Reddy of Indian National Congress is currently representing the constituency.

== Wards ==
The Assembly Constituency presently comprises the following Wards:

Ward Number
24 & 27, 30, 31,32, 36 to 52

== Members of Legislative Assembly ==
Duration	Member	Political party
Andhra Pradesh
2009-10	Dasyam Vinay Bhaskar	Telangana Rashtra Samithi
2010-14 (by-election)	Dasyam Vinay Bhaskar	Telangana Rashtra Samithi
Telangana
2014-18	Dasyam Vinay Bhaskar	Telangana Rashtra Samithi
2018-23	Dasyam Vinay Bhaskar	Telangana Rashtra Samithi
2023-	Naini Rajender Reddy	Indian National Congress

== Election results ==
=== Telangana Legislative Assembly election, 2023 ===
Telangana Assembly Elections, 2023: Warangal West
Party	Candidate	Votes	%	±%
INC	Naini Rajender Reddy	72,649	43.50	
BRS	Dasyam Vinay Bhaskar	57,318	34.32	
BJP	Rao Padma	30,826	18.46	
NOTA	None of the Above	2,426	1.45	
Majority		15,331	9.18	
Turnout		1,67,025		
INC gain from BRS		Swing		

=== Telangana Legislative Assembly election, 2018 ===
2018 Telangana Legislative Assembly election: Warangal West
Party	Candidate	Votes	%	±%
TRS	Dasyam Vinay Bhaskar	81,006	56.78	
TDP	Revuri Prakash Reddy	44,555	31.23	
BJP	Dharmarao Marthineni	5,979	4.19	
SFB	S. V. Ramana Rao	3,619	2.54	
NOTA	None of the Above	3,075	2.16	
Majority		36,451		
Turnout		1,42,664	59.21	
TRS hold		Swing		

=== Telangana Legislative Assembly election, 2014 ===
2014 Telangana Legislative Assembly election: Warangal West
Party	Candidate	Votes	%	±%
TRS	Dasyam Vinay Bhaskar	83,492	59.31	
INC	Swarna Errabelli	27,188	19.31	
BJP	Dharmarao Marthineni	18,584	13.2	
Majority		56,304		
Turnout		1,40,772	60.18	
TRS hold		Swing		

=== Andhra Pradesh Legislative Assembly By-election, 2010 ===
2010 Andhra Pradesh Legislative Assembly By-election: Warangal West
Party	Candidate	Votes	%	±%
TRS	Dasyam Vinay Bhaskar	88,449	74.85	
INC	K. D. Rao	20,925	17.71	
TDP	Vem Narender Reddy	5,762	4.88	
Majority		67,524		
Turnout		1,18,171	53.80	
TRS hold		Swing		

== See also ==
- Warangal East (Assembly constituency)
- List of constituencies of Telangana Legislative Assembly
