= Padala Aruna =

Indian politician

Padala Aruna (born 1957) is an Indian politician from Andhra Pradesh. She was a former three-time Member of the Legislative Assembly. She was an MLA from Gajapathinagaram representing the Telugu Desam Party from 1989 to 1999. She was a former Minister for Women and Child Welfare.

Aruna is from Vizianagaram. She was a graduate from a college affiliated with Andhra University. She married Ramunaidu.

== Career ==
Aruna started her political life in 1987 following the reservation for women by NT Rama Rao and became mandal chairperson in Bondapalli. She was first elected as an MLA winning the 1989 Andhra Pradesh Legislative Assembly election from Gajapathinagaram Assembly constituency representing the Telugu Desam Party. She retained the seat for Telugu Desam winning the 1994 Andhra Pradesh Legislative Assembly election. She regained the seat in 2004 for Telugu Desam, which lost the 1999 Assembly election. In January 2021, she quit the Telugu Desam Party.
