= Sangamreddy Satyanarayana =

Indian politician

Minister for Transport, Government of Andhra Pradesh
- In office 1983–1984

Member of Legislative Assembly, Andhra Pradesh
- In office 1983–1985
- Preceded by: V. Venkateshwara Rao
- Succeeded by: T. Hayagreevachari
- Constituency: Hanamkonda

Personal details
- Born: 21 January 1933 Muchcherla, Hyderabad State (present-day Telangana, India)
- Died: 10 October 2016 (aged 83) Hyderabad, Telangana, India
- Other political affiliations: Telugu Desam Party
- Children: 4

Sangamreddy Satyanarayana (21 January 1933 – 10 October 2016), popularly known as Muchcherla Satyanarayana, was an Indian politician, first-generation lyricist, and Telangana activist. He served as the Minister for Transport in the Government of Andhra Pradesh from 1983 to 1984. He was a Member of the Legislative Assembly from Hanamkonda Assembly constituency.

== Early life ==
Satyanarayana was born on 21 January 1933 in Muchcherla village of Hasanparthi mandal, Hanamkonda district in Telangana to Narsamma and Narsaiah. During his childhood he actively participated in plays such as Sri Krishna Tulabharam and Satya Harischandra. He was a contemporary of Prof. Jayashankar, who used to perform female roles in those plays.

== Political career ==
Following the introduction of the Panchayati Raj system in 1959, Satyanarayana began his political career as Sarpanch of Muchcherla village. He later served two terms as Samithi President and as President of Hanamkonda Panchayat. In 1983, Satyanarayana was elected to the Andhra Pradesh Legislative Assembly from Hanamkonda Assembly constituency as a candidate of the Telugu Desam Party, defeating T. Hayagreevachari of the Indian National Congress by a margin of 17,697 votes. He was inducted into the First N. T. Rama Rao ministry as the Minister for Transport in the Government of Andhra Pradesh.

=== Role in Telangana movement ===
Satyanarayana participated in the 1952 Mulkhi Agitation and 1969 Telangana Agitation. He founded the newspaper Jai Telangana and later established the Telangana Rakshana Samithi.

He was one of the founding members of Telangana Rashtra Samithi and contributed ideological guidance during the Telangana movement.

== Death and legacy ==
Satyanarayana died on 10 October 2016 in Hyderabad at the age of 83.

A biography on his life and struggles, Dhikkara Keratam, authored by P. Chand, was released on 9 November 2017 at Hanamkonda Public Garden.
