= Syed Ahmed Pasha Quadri =

Indian politician (1953–2026)

General Secretary of All India Majlis e Ittehadul Muslimeen
- In office 2008 – 3 February 2026
- Preceded by: Sultan Salahuddin Owaisi

Member of Telangana Legislative Assembly
- In office 2018–2023
- Preceded by: Mumtaz Ahmed Khan
- Constituency: Yakutpura (Assembly constituency)

Member of Andhra Pradesh Legislative Assembly
- In office 2004–2018
- Preceded by: Asaduddin Owaisi
- Constituency: Charminar Assembly constituency

Personal details
- Born: 1953
- Died: 3 February 2026 (aged 72–73) Kanchanbagh, Hyderabad, Telangana, India
- Party: All India Majlis-e-Ittehadul Muslimeen
- Parent: Syed Murtaza Pasha Quadri
- Occupation: Politician

Syed Ahmed Pasha Quadri (1953 – 3 February 2026) was an Indian politician. He was a member of the AIMIM party. Quadri was the trusted confidante and close friend of the late Sultan Salahuddin Owaisi. Quadri won from Charminar Assembly constituency in 2004 and was able to retain it in 2009, 2014 and 2018 assembly elections. He retired from the post of MLA candidate of AIMIM Yakutpura ahead of the 2023 Telangana Legislative Assembly. Quadri died from kidney disease on 3 February 2026, at the age of 72.
