= Dasyam Pranay Bhasker =

Indian politician

Minister of State for Sports, Youth Services, Youth Welfare, National Cadet Corps, Self Employment of Andhra Pradesh
- In office December 1994 – September 1995

Member of the Andhra Pradesh Legislative Assembly
- In office 1989–1999

Personal details
- Born: 6 July 1956 Parkal
- Died: 6 July 1999 (aged 43) Patancheru
- Party: Telugu Desam Party (1982–1996)
- Spouse: Dasyam Sabitha Bhasker
- Children: Dasyam Abhinavya Bhasker and Dasyam Apoorva Bhasker
- Education: Warangal

Dasyam Pranay Bhasker (born 6 July 1956) was an Indian politician, Minister and Member of Andhra Pradesh Legislative Assembly (MLA) for Hanamkonda (Assembly constituency), representing the Telugu Desam Party.

== Early life ==
Dasyam Pranay Bhasker was born on 6 July 1956 in Parkal, Warangal District.

== Political career ==
In 1989 AP Assembly elections Dasyam Pranay Bhasker contested from Hanamkonda Assembly representing TDP party and lost to P. V. Ranga Rao of INC, but 1994 Assembly elections re-contested in Hanamkonda Assembly Constituency and was elected defeating INC's P.V. Ranga Rao. and served as Minister of State for Sports, Youth Services, Youth Welfare, NCC Self Employment in N.T. Rama Rao cabinet.

== Telangana Movement ==
Dasyam Pranay Bhasker was very much active and part of the then separate Telangana Movement. After pro term Speaker K. Jana Reddy announced the unanimous election of Chary as the Speaker, leaders of all political parties conducted him to the Chair. Speaking first on the occasion, Chandrasekhar Rao reminded the House that in the late ’90s, the mere mention of Telangana by late Dasyam Pranay Bhaskar had been removed from the records and the member was chided by the then Speaker.
