= Chintala Ramachandra Reddy (born 1964) =

Indian politician

Chintala Ramachandra Reddy (born 1964) is an Indian politician from Andhra Pradesh. He is a four-time MLA. He won the 2019 Andhra Pradesh Legislative Assembly Election on YSRCP ticket from Pileru constituency in Chittoor district. He is nominated to contest the Pileru seat representing YSRCP for the 2024 Assembly elections.

== Early life and education ==
Reddy father Surendra Reddy is a farmer. He hails from Jarravaripalle, Vayalpadu mandal, Chittoor. He did his schooling from P. V. C. government high school, Vayalpadu finishing his SSLC in 1979. He completed his graduation in Arts from B. T. College, Madanapalle, affiliated to Sri Venkateswara University, Tirupati, in 1985. He married Nirajamma and has a son, Sai Krishna Reddy. Krishna Reddy developed an app for his father to keep in touch with the electorate and it became very useful to connect with the people during Covid pandemic.

== Career ==
He first won the 1987 the bye election to Vayalpadu constituency as a TDP candidate at the age of 25 defeating Congress Party candidate, Nallari Sarojamma, wife of sitting MLA Amarnath Reddy, whose death necessitated the bye poll. But he lost the 1989 polls. He won the 1994 Andhra Pradesh Legislative Assembly Election representing Telugu Desam Party from Vayalpadu constituency but lost the 1999 and 2009 elections on TDP and PRP tickets respectively. Later in 2014, he shifted to YSRCP and won the MLA seat from the neighboring Pileru constituency. In 2019, he was re-elected from Pileru representing YSRCP polling 87,300 votes.
