= Mumtaz Ahmed Khan (Telangana politician) =

Indian politician

Member of Andhra Pradesh Legislative Assembly
- In office 1994-99, 1999-04, 2004-09, 2009-14
- Preceded by: Ibrahim Bin Abdullah Masqati
- Succeeded by: Mumtaz Ahmed Khan
- Constituency: Yakutpura

Member of Telangana Legislative Assembly
- In office 2014-2018
- Preceded by: "Constituency Shift to Telangana"
- Succeeded by: Syed Ahmed Pasha Quadri
- Constituency: Yakutpura

Member of Telangana Legislative Assembly
- In office December 2018 – 2023
- Preceded by: Syed Ahmed Pasha Quadri
- Constituency: Charminar

2nd Pro-tem Speaker Telangana Legislative Assembly
- In office 11 December 2018 – 14 December 2018
- Governor: Dr. Tamilisai Soundararajan
- Chief Minister: K. Chandrashekar Rao
- Preceded by: Kunduru Jana Reddy
- Succeeded by: Akbaruddin Owaisi

Personal details
- Born: 1949 (age 76–77) Hyderabad
- Party: All India Majlis-e-Ittehadul Muslimeen
- Other political affiliations: Majlis Bachao Tehreek
- Children: 5
- Parent: Late Ghulam Ghouse Khan (father)

Mumtaz Ahmed Khan is a Member of Telangana Legislative Assembly elected in December 2018 from Charminar constituency. He is the honorable Speaker of Telangana Assembly. He was the five time M.L.A. from Yakutpura constituency in the State of Telangana, India. He also performs the duty of Panel Speaker in Telangana Legislative Assembly.

Khan won his sixth consecutive legislative assembly election from this area of the city of Hyderabad. He has represented Yakuthpura Assembly constituency from 1994 to 2018.

He is a member of the All India Majlis-e-Ittehadul Muslimeen party, which has traditionally controlled the politics in this capital city of Telangana.

AIMIM Charminar MLA Mumtaz Ahmed Khan was sworn in on Wednesday as Telangana pro-tem speaker.

== Positions held ==
Duration	Constituency	Political party
1994–99	Yakutpura	Majlis Bachao Tehreek
1999–04	Yakutpura	All India Majlis-e-Ittehadul Muslimeen
2004–09	Yakutpura	All India Majlis-e-Ittehadul Muslimeen
2009–14	Yakutpura	All India Majlis-e-Ittehadul Muslimeen
2014–18	Yakutpura	All India Majlis-e-Ittehadul Muslimeen
2018–23	Charminar	All India Majlis-e-Ittehadul Muslimeen
