= Karra Subba Reddy =

Indian politician

Karra Subba Reddy (died 2004) was a politician from the Rayalaseema region of Andhra Pradesh, India. He represented the Koilkuntla constituency for three consecutive terms to Andhra Pradesh State Assembly.

== Biography ==
Reddy was born in a remote village of Pedda Yemmanur in Uyyalawada mandal of Kurnool district. He was adopted by kin relatives at the nearby village of Kakarawada. After his primary education he graduated in Law and became one of the foremost people to study law in that area.

== Politics ==
While practicing law at Koilkuntla he was inclined to enter into active politics, though in the initial stages he did not succeed. In 1975, he contested as Samithi president and was defeated. The next year he contested to Koilkuntla assembly constituency as an independent candidate. Though he was defeated by M. V. Subbareddy he gained wide exposure to the people of the constituency. In the 1983 general elections, he and his close friend G. V. Kondareddy were offered the ticket of the newly formed Telugu Desam Party. But both of them did not show any interest due to local politics. TDP formed the government and its founder NTR became the Chief Minister. But 17 months later he was overthrown by his deputy Nandendla Bhaskar Rao, which was considered to be the most famous 'backstab' in the history of Indian democracy. In this politics, the sitting Koilkuntla MLA B. Narasimha Reddy stood with Nadendla. However NTR regained his post due to widespread disgust from the public. Soon after this incident, NTR sought for midterm polls to win the people's mandate again. This time both Karra and GVK tried for the TDP ticket. Both of them had a mutual agreement that whoever procured the ticket the other one should support. Karra was victorious in procuring the ticket and winning the polls as well. Later, he became one of a few politicians in Rayalaseema to have been elected 3 consecutive times, which is regarded as a 'hat trick.' He is a non controversial politician in A. P. and had friends in all other parties also. He was called Ajatashatru by the people simply because he was the only politician who could move without gunman's security in the 'faction infested' Rayalaseema. Opposition party leader Dr. Y. S. Raja Sekhar Reddy praised to this effect in the floor of assembly. In the 1999 general elections, he contested for the fourth time but was narrowly defeated. This election became controversial as Karra and his followers criticised the polls, claiming they were highly manipulated and rigging of the votes took place.

== Retired life ==
After being defeated in the elections, Karra almost spent a retired life. He was participating in several debates about the water resources of Andhra Pradesh and Rayalaseema in particular. The politics of TDP for the constituency was being looked after by his elder son Harshavardhan Reddy. In 2004 elections, Karra was denied the ticket. This created an uproar in the cadre. Hence he was forced to contest as an independent candidate. But this time 'money politics' became more popular that 'Karra's sort of politicians' could find no place. After the elections Karra completely retired from active politics, leaving his son Harsha as his heir. He died of a heart attack in 2004.

== Posts held ==
- served as chairman, public accounts committee of Govt. of A.P.
- served as member in estimates committee
