= Khilwat =

Khilwat clock tower
- Nickname: Khilwat Mubarak clock tower
- Interactive map of Khilwat clock tower
- Established: 17 September 1835

Khilwat Mubarak is a historically significant area in the midst of Old City, Hyderabad, India. The area is in the vicinity of the Chowmohalla Palace, which was developed by the Asaf Jahi dynasty. The area has many pre-historic buildings with intricate architecture which lends itself to a lavish lifestyle. Some of the wealthiest figures live in this part of Hyderabad. The Khilwat area is said to have many hidden treasures. This can be traced back to the olden days, when it was believed that there were no banks or government institutions holding valuable goods. Instead, rich people used to hide them in the earth so that they wouldn't be stolen. Only a few family members knew the exact location of these hidden treasures.
