= Ramlu Komireddi =

Ramlu Komireddi is a senior lawyer, journalist and a left-leaning liberal politician in India.

== Education ==
Komireddi attended City College, Hyderabad, and studied law at the Law College of Osmania University, and journalism (BCJ) at the same university, emerging as one of the foremost and most successful lawyers of his generation.

== Politics: 1970s — present ==
An active participant in student politics, Komireddi was elected the students' General Secretary of Osmania University, one of the most prestigious positions in Indian student politics, when he was studying law there. After leaving University, he moved to Delhi to join Ram Jethmalani, whose political campaigns and schedules he managed. Eventually, despite his active distaste for the Bharatiya Janata Party (B.J.P.) and its ideology, which he perceived as "divisive," he reluctantly joined the party at Jethmalani's behest. In 1978, in what was to be the first of many attempts, Komireddi ran for the Andhra Pradesh Legislative Assembly as a B.J.P. candidate and lost. Komireddi went ahead and contested the 1985 election from Metpalli as an independent, winning 22.31 percent of the vote to Vidyasagar Rao's 22.88 percent. It was a narrow victory for Rao, an outsider, and a second defeat for Komireddi, a native of Metpalli. Reacting to reports of malfeasance in the ballot-counting, Komireddi sought, and was promptly denied, a recount, and consequently, he took the matter to the Supreme Court of India, which upheld the election. Disillusioned by the entire saga, Komireddi returned to legal practice, soon establishing himself as one of the most successful lawyers in Andhra Pradesh. Eventually, he joined the Congress Party, within which he was promoted to various important, although not very powerful, positions at state-level.

In 1998, his wife, Jyoti Devi, was chosen by the Congress to contest the by-election in Metpalli, after the seat fell vacant following Vidyasagar Rao's election to the Lok Sabha the same year. Of the four by-elections held that year, Devi's was the only Congress victory. Devi soon established herself as a sedulous legislator and an astute politician, endearing herself to Sonia Gandhi and, resultantly, securing many positions of power within the Andhra Pradesh Congress Committee.

In 2004's general elections, Komireddi was denied Congress's endorsement, and when he declared that he would run as an independent, in defiance of Congress's alliance with a regional party, he was expelled from the party for six years. He ran as a Janata Party candidate, but used Sonia Gandhi's posters and the Congress's manifesto, claiming that, ideologically, he was inseparable from the Congress and, too, that Sonia Gandhi was the best hope for India. He was elected to the Andhra Pradesh Legislative Assembly with a majority of over five thousand votes. Within the House, he was elected to the Floor Leadership of the Janata Party; his expulsion from Congress was eventually annulled and he was in 2004 made an "associate member" of its legislative wing. Among the non-ministerial members, Komireddi's perhaps is the most enviable position within the House: he enjoys virtually all the benefits of being a Congress member, including invitations to the Congress Legislative Party's meetings where he is known to air his views volubly, while retaining the enviable independence of a Floor Leader. He has frequently used his bully pulpit to strongly defend the Chief Minister Y. S. Rajasekhara Reddy and attack the principal Opposition. He is seen as a trusted lieutenant of the Chief Minister.
