= Mudinepalli =

- Village
- Interactive map of Mudinepalli
- Location in Andhra Pradesh, India
- Coordinates: 16.4280°N 81.1150°E
- Country: India
- State: Andhra Pradesh
- District: Eluru
- Founder: Chaitanya Kumar B

Government
  - Type: TDP
- Elevation: 7 m (23 ft)

Population (2011)
  - Total: 6,463

Languages
  - Official: Telugu
- Time zone: UTC+5:30 (IST)
- PIN: 521 325
- Telephone code: +91–8674
- Vehicle registration: AP–40
- Literacy: 59%
- Lok Sabha constituency: Eluru
- Vidhan Sabha constituency: Kaikalur
- Website: http://mudinepalli.in

Mudinepalli is a village in the Eluru District (previously Krishna district) of the Indian state of Andhra Pradesh. Mudinepalli hosts nearly all species of Indian snakes, which can survive in this southern region of India.

== Demographics ==
As of 2019 (according to the Census of India), the town had a population of 7,463. The population consists of 4,280 males, 3,183 females and 543 children aged 0–6 years. The average literacy rate stands at 77.85% with 4,608 literates, significantly higher than the national average of 73%.

== Transport ==
Bus stand : According to the town had a Bus stand. Major buses coming from Gudivada depot. Good connectivity from all around to villages and major towns / cities like Vijayawada, Gudivada, Kaikaluru, Gudlavalleru, Bantumilli, Bhimavaram & Machilipatnam.

Railway Station : Gudivada Junction is the nearest Railway station, around 13km.

== Education ==
Major Schools & Colleges

== Etymology ==
Mudinepalli was formerly known as Mudi Naagula Palli. The village derives its name from the Sanskrit words mudi which means 'old', nāgá which means 'snake' (or 'cobra'), and palli which means 'village'. The name also relates to Nāgá Devatha, a Hindu deity. Mudinepalli was earlier known as Mudi Nagula Palli. The name of the village is derived from the Sanskrit words 'gramam' meaning 'snake' ('cobra') meaning 'old' and 'naga' meaning 'mudi'. The name is related to the Hindu deity Naga.

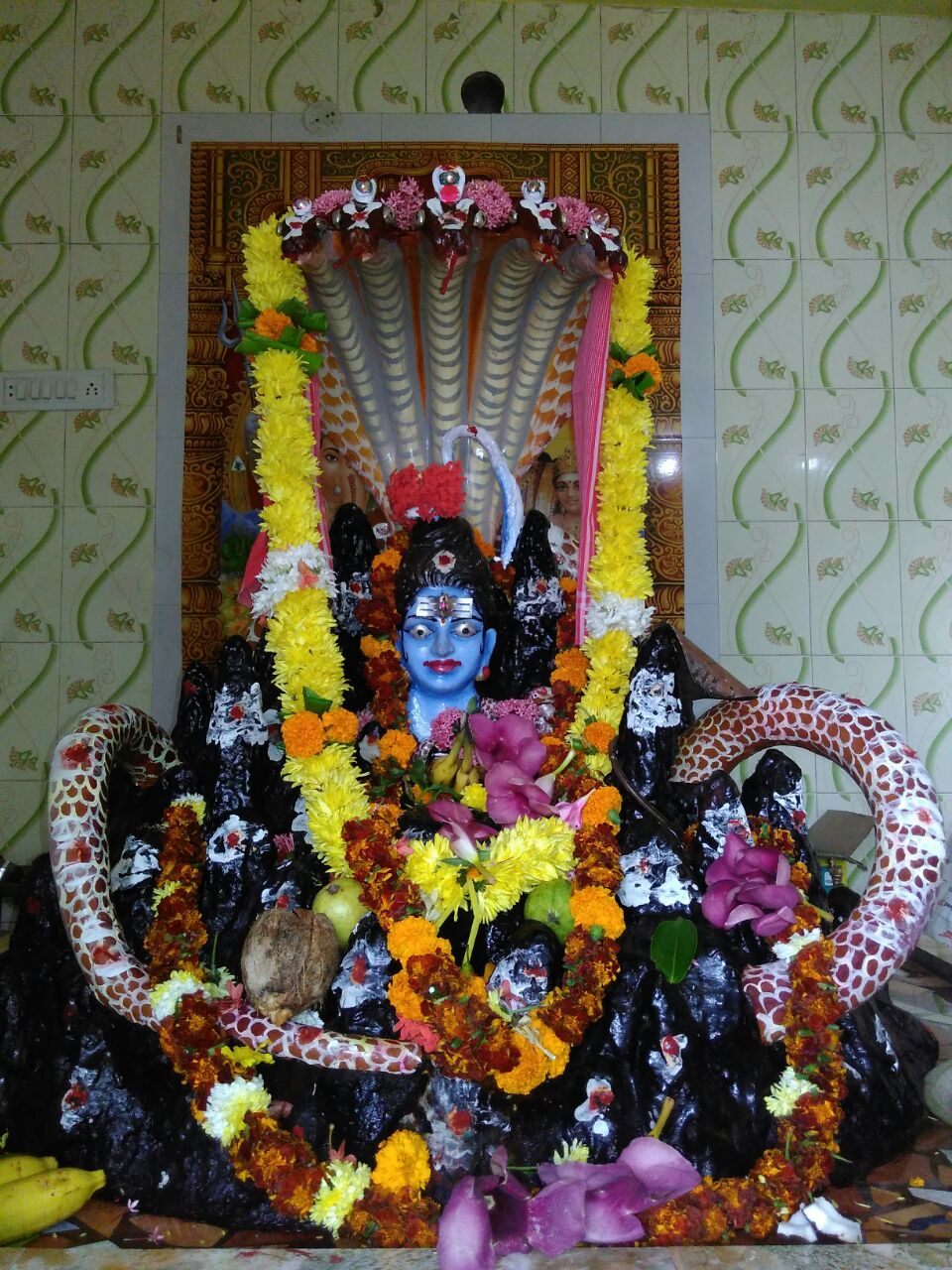
Pancha muka siva nagendra swamy, Mudinepalli

== See also ==
- Villages in Mudinepalli mandal
