= P. V. Ranga Rao =

Indian politician

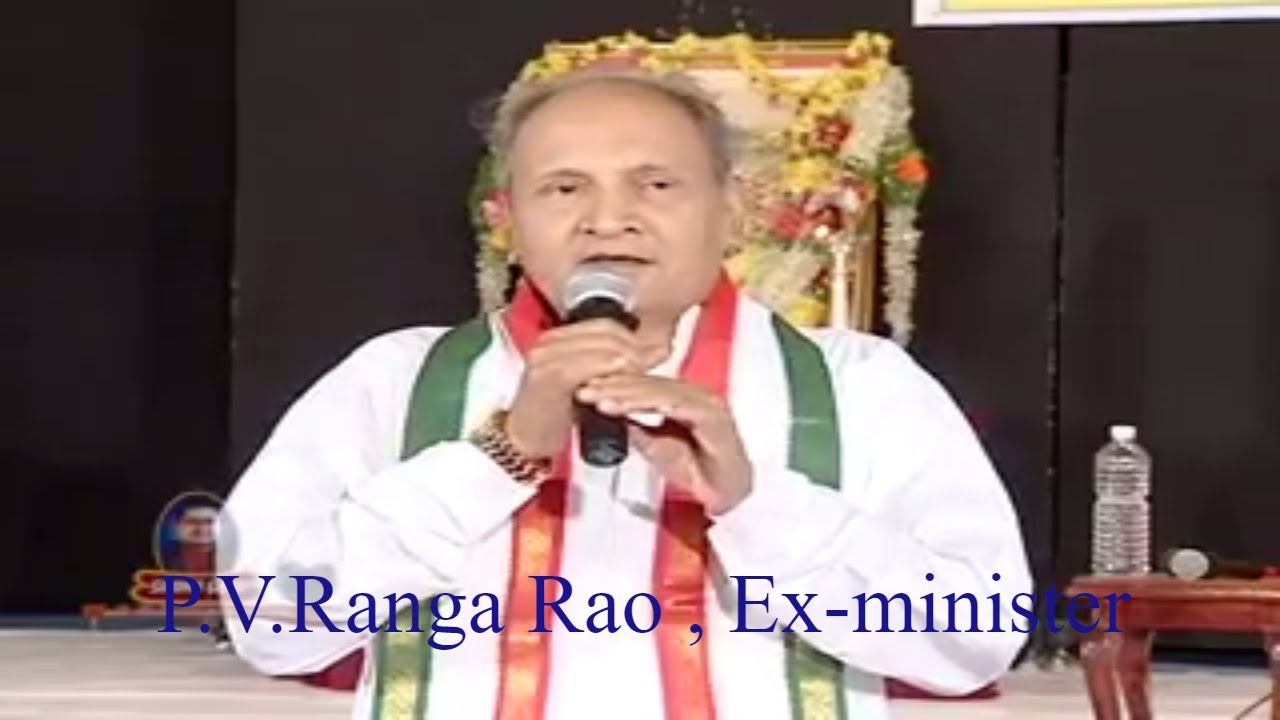

Pamulaparthi Venkata Ranga Rao (1940 – 1 August 2013) was an Indian politician who belonged to the Indian National Congress. He was the eldest son of former Prime Minister of India, P. V. Narasimha Rao.

== Early life ==
Rao was born in Vangara village in Karimnagar district, Hyderabad state to P. V. Narasimha Rao and his wife Satyamma. He received his bachelor's and master's degrees from Osmania University. He had two younger brothers, P. V. Rajeshwar Rao and P. V. Prabhakar Rao, and also had five sisters. He remained a bachelor throughout his life.

== Career ==
Rao was a two-time MLA from Hanamkonda in Warangal district and also a member of the Legislative Council. He served as Education Minister in the Kotla Vijaya Bhaskara Reddy cabinet. He died on 1 August 2013.
