= 1998 Indian general election in Andhra Pradesh =

- February 1998

42 seats
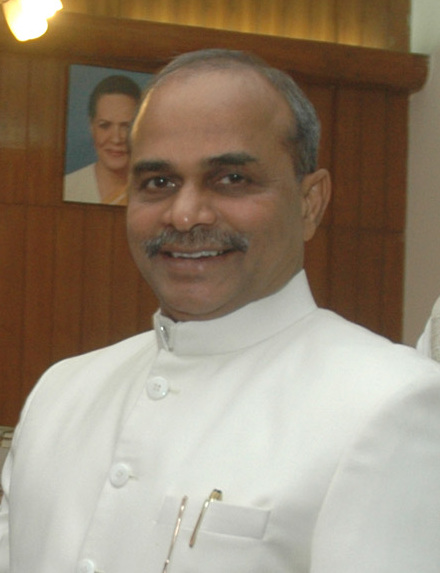

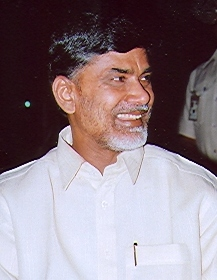
	First party	Second party
Leader	Y. S. Rajasekhara Reddy	N. Chandrababu Naidu
Party	INC	TDP
Alliance	INC +	None
Leader's seat	Kadapa	None
Last election	22	16
Seats won	22	12
Seat change	Steady	▼4
Popular vote	12,269,475	12,215,937
Percentage	38.46%	38.29%
Swing	▼0.40%	▲1.20%
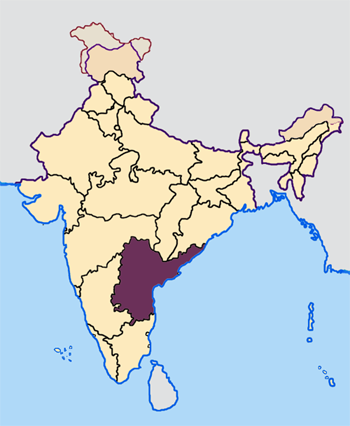
- Andhra Pradesh
Prime Minister before election
Inder Kumar Gujral
JD
Prime Minister after election
Atal Bihari Vajpayee
BJP

The 1998 Indian general election in Andhra Pradesh were held for 42 seats in the state. The result was a victory for the Indian National Congress, which won 22 out of 42 seats.

== Parties and alliances ==
Alliance/Party		Flag	Symbol	Leader	Seats contested	
United Front	Telugu Desam Party			N. Chandrababu Naidu	35	42
United Front	Communist Party of India (Marxist)			Harkishan Singh Surjeet	3	42
United Front	Communist Party of India			Sudhakar Reddy	3	42
United Front	Janata Dal			V. P. Singh	1	42
Indian National Congress				Y. S. Rajasekhara Reddy	42	
National Democratic Alliance	Bharatiya Janata Party			C. Vidyasagar Rao	38	
National Democratic Alliance	NTR Telugu Desam Party (LP)			Lakshmi Parvathi	5	
All India Majlis-e-Ittehadul Muslimeen				Sultan Salahuddin Owaisi	1	

== Candidates ==
Constituency		TDP+		INC		NDA	
#	Name	Party	Candidate	Party	Candidate	Party	Candidate
1	Srikakulam	TDP	Kinjarapu Yerran Naidu	INC	Dharmana Prasada Rao	NTDP	Appayya Dora Hanumanthu
2	Parvathipuram (ST)	TDP	S. Vijaya Rama Raju	INC	V. Pradeep Kumar Dev		
3	Bobbili	TDP	Kondapalli Pydithalli Naidu	INC	Botsa Satyanarayana	BJP	Vasireddy Varada Rama Rao
4	Visakhapatnam	TDP	P. Ananda Gajapati Raju	INC	T. Subbarami Reddy	BJP	D. V. Subba Rao
5	Bhadrachalam (ST)	CPI	Sode Ramaiah	INC	Kamala Kumari Karredula	NTDP	Setti Lakshmanudu
6	Anakapalli	TDP	C. Ayyanna Patrudu	INC	Gudivada Gurunadha Rao	BJP	P. V. Chalapathi Rao
7	Kakinada	TDP	Thota Gopala Krishna	INC	M. M. Pallam Raju	BJP	Krishnam Raju
8	Rajahmundry	TDP	M. V. V. S. Murthi	INC	T. V. Satyanarayana Reddy	BJP	Girajala Venkata Swamy Naidu
9	Amalapuram (SC)	TDP	G. M. C. Balayogi	INC	K. S. R. Murthy	BJP	Umamaheswara Rao K.
10	Narasapur	TDP	Kothapalli Subbarayudu	INC	Kanumuri Bapi Raju	BJP	Dr. Parakala Prabhakar
11	Eluru	TDP	Bolla Bulli Ramaiah	INC	Maganti Venkateswara Rao	BJP	Jayalakshmi Yalamarthi
12	Machilipatnam	TDP	Kaikala Satyanarayana	INC	Kavuri Samba Siva Rao	BJP	Nagarjuna Rao Vemuri
13	Vijayawada	TDP	Jai Ramesh Dasari	INC	P. Upendra	BJP	Vadde Ramakrishna Prasad
14	Tenali	TDP	Sarada Tadiparthi	INC	P. Shiv Shanker	BJP	Raghunadha Babu Yadlapati
15	Guntur	TDP	S. M. Laljan Basha	INC	Rayapati Sambasiva Rao	BJP	Avula Veerasekhararao
16	Bapatla	TDP	Ummareddy Venkateswarlu	INC	N. Janardhana Reddy	BJP	Ganesuni Rathaiah Chowdary
17	Narasaraopet	TDP	Saidaiah Kota	INC	Konijeti Rosaiah	BJP	Kabbireddy Medikonda
18	Ongole	TDP	Mekapati Rajamohan Reddy	INC	Magunta Sreenivasulu Reddy	BJP	Kondapalli Guravaiah Naidu
19	Nellore (SC)	CPM	Buduru Swarnalatha	INC	Panabaka Lakshmi	BJP	Karupothala Balakondaiah
20	Tirupati (SC)	TDP	Dr. N. Sivaprasad	INC	Chintha Mohan	BJP	N. Venkataswamy
21	Chittoor	TDP	N. Ramakrishna Reddy	INC	M. Gnanendra Reddy	BJP	N. P. Venkateswara Chowdary
22	Rajampet	TDP	Gunipati Ramaiah	INC	Annayyagari Sai Prathap	BJP	Dr. A. Harinath Reddy
23	Cuddapah	TDP	Kandula Rajamohana Reddy	INC	Y. S. Rajasekhara Reddy	BJP	Nagendra Prasad Kadiri
24	Hindupur	TDP	S. Ramachandra Reddy	INC	S. Gangadhar	BJP	Smt. Anjani Devi Pamudurthi
25	Anantapur	CPI	K. Ramakrishna	INC	Anantha Venkatarami Reddy	BJP	Veluri Kesava Chowdary
26	Kurnool	TDP	K. E. Krishna Murthy	INC	Kotla Vijaya Bhaskara Reddy	BJP	K. Venkataswamy
27	Nandyal	TDP	Bhuma Nagi Reddy	INC	G. Prathap Reddy	BJP	Syed Jaffar Ali Khan
28	Nagarkurnool (SC)	TDP	Manda Jagannath	INC	Mallu Ravi	BJP	S. Balu
29	Mahabubnagar	JD	Jaipal Reddy	INC	Mallikarjun Goud	BJP	A. P. Jithender Reddy
30	Hyderabad	TDP	K. S. Ratnam	INC	Kichannagari Laxma Reddy	BJP	Baddam Bal Reddy
31	Secunderabad	TDP	Alladi P. Rajkumar	INC	P. V. Rajeshwar Rao	BJP	Bandaru Dattatreya
32	Siddipet (SC)	TDP	Malyala Rajaiah	INC	Nandi Yellaiah	BJP	N. A. Krishna
33	Medak	TDP	Patlolla Manik Reddy	INC	Mogaligundla Baga Reddy	BJP	Ale Narendra
34	Nizamabad	TDP	Gaddam Ganga Reddy	INC	K. Keshava Rao	BJP	Atmacharan Reddy Gaddam
35	Adilabad	TDP	Samudrala Venugopal Chary	INC	Allola Indrakaran Reddy	BJP	Vishnu Prakash Bajaj
36	Peddapalli (SC)	TDP	Chellamalla Suguna Kumari	INC	Gaddam Venkatswamy	BJP	Lingaiah Kasipeta
37	Karimnagar	TDP	L. Ramana	INC	Meneni Satyanarayana Rao	BJP	C. Vidyasagar Rao
38	Hanamkonda	TDP	Chada Suresh Reddy	INC	Kamaluddin Ahmed	NTDP	S. Madhusudhana Chary
39	Warangal	TDP	Azmeera Chandulal	INC	T. Kalpana Devi	BJP	Chandupatla Janga Reddy
40	Khammam	CPM	Tammineni Veerabhadram	INC	N. Bhaskara Rao	BJP	Dharavath Ravinder Naik
41	Nalgonda	CPI	Suravaram Sudhakar Reddy	INC	V. Hanumantha Rao	BJP	N. Indrasena Reddy
42	Miryalguda	CPM	Cherupally Seetha Ramulu	INC	Baddam Narsimha Reddy	BJP	Juttukonda Satyanarayana

== Voting and results ==
Alliance/ Party		Popular vote			Seats		
Alliance/ Party		Votes	%	±pp	Contested	Won	+/−
INC		1,22,69,475	38.46	▼1.20	42	22	Steady
UF	TDP	1,01,99,463	31.97	▼0.62	35	12	▼4
UF	CPI(M)	9,21,972	2.89	▼0.02	3	0	▼1
UF	CPI	8,16,200	2.56	▲0.17	3	2	Steady
UF	JD	2,78,302	0.87	Steady	1	1	▲1
UF	Total	1,22,15,937	38.29	Steady	42	15	Steady
NDA	BJP	58,36,394	18.30	▲12.65	36 + 2	4	▲4
NDA	NTDP	3,84,211	1.20	▼9.46	3 + 2	0	Steady
NDA	Total	62,20,605	19.50	Steady	39 + 4	4	Steady
AIMIM		4,85,785	1.52	▲0.40	1	1	Steady
Others		1,69,531	0.54	Steady	55	0	Steady
IND		5,37,578	1.69	▼2.11	207	0	Steady
Total		3,18,98,911	100%	-	390	42	-

== List of elected members ==
Constituency			Winner				Runner Up				Margin	%
#	Name	Poll %	Candidate	Party	Votes	%	Candidate	Party	Votes	%	Margin	%
1	Srikakulam	43.14%	K. Yerran Naidu	TDP	2,86,582	42.57	Appayya Dora Hanumanthu	NTDP	2,00,217	29.74	86,365	12.83
2	Parvathipuram (ST)	50.55%	Vijaya R. Setrucharla	TDP	2,99,904	49.57	V. Pradeep Kumar Dev	INC	2,76,627	45.73	23,277	3.84
3	Bobbili	43.89%	K. Pydithalli Naidu	TDP	2,98,961	43.12	Botsa Satyanarayana	INC	2,72,053	39.24	26,908	3.88
4	Visakhapatnam	42.21%	T. Subbarami Reddy	INC	3,75,782	41.54	P. Ananda Gajapati Raju	TDP	3,14,265	34.74	61,517	6.80
5	Bhadrachalam (ST)	39.10%	Sode Ramaiah	CPI	2,63,141	38.02	Kamala K. Karredula	INC	2,03,701	29.43	59,440	8.59
6	Anakapalli	43.96%	G. Gurunadha Rao	INC	3,21,840	43.28	C. Ayyanna Patrudu	TDP	2,95,915	39.80	25,925	3.48
7	Kakinada	41.06%	Krishnam Raju	BJP	3,30,381	40.53	T. Gopala Krishna	TDP	2,62,582	32.21	67,799	8.32
8	Rajahmundry	36.57%	Girajala Venkata Swamy	BJP	2,85,741	36.15	M. V. V. S. Murthi	TDP	2,75,829	34.89	9,912	1.26
9	Amalapuram (SC)	43.57%	G. M. C. Balayogi	TDP	2,86,953	43.07	K. S. R. Murthy	INC	1,96,713	29.53	90,240	13.54
10	Narasapur	50.66%	Kanumuri Bapi Raju	INC	3,68,630	50.14	Kothapalli Subbarayudu	TDP	3,20,660	43.61	47,970	6.53
11	Eluru	47.68%	M. Venkateswara Rao	INC	3,85,412	47.04	Bolla Bulli Ramaiah	TDP	3,61,605	44.14	23,807	2.90
12	Machilipatnam	51.28%	Kavuri Samba Siva Rao	INC	3,55,030	50.70	Kaikala Satyanarayana	TDP	2,73,938	39.12	81,092	11.58
13	Vijayawada	45.02%	P. Upendra	INC	4,05,062	44.48	Jai Ramesh Dasari	TDP	3,74,995	41.18	30,067	3.30
14	Tenali	46.34%	P. Shiv Shankar	INC	2,90,014	45.83	Sarada	TDP	2,75,478	43.54	14,536	2.29
15	Guntur	47.79%	Rayapati Sambasiva Rao	INC	3,59,456	47.24	S. M. Laljan Basha	TDP	3,02,109	39.71	57,347	7.53
16	Bapatla	47.31%	N. Janardhana Reddy	INC	3,16,788	46.74	Ummareddy Venkateswarlu	TDP	2,76,300	40.77	40,488	5.97
17	Narasaraopet	50.22%	Konijeti Rosaiah	INC	3,75,815	49.58	Kota Saidaiah	TDP	3,27,996	43.27	47,819	6.31
18	Ongole	47.75%	M. Sreenivasulu Reddy	INC	3,51,390	47.13	M. Rajamohan Reddy	TDP	3,30,524	44.33	20,866	2.80
19	Nellore (SC)	40.06%	Panabaka Lakshmi	INC	2,96,731	39.41	Buduru Swarnalatha	CPM	2,50,204	33.23	46,527	6.18
20	Tirupathi (SC)	38.52%	Chinta Mohan	INC	2,88,904	38.02	N. Sivaprasad	TDP	2,79,558	36.79	9,346	1.23
21	Chittoor	45.13%	N. Ramakrishna Reddy	TDP	3,49,831	44.53	M. Gnanendra Reddy	INC	2,69,750	34.33	80,081	10.20
22	Rajampet	45.35%	A. Sai Prathap	INC	2,74,889	44.68	Gunipati Ramaiah	TDP	2,26,993	36.89	47,896	7.79
23	Cuddapah	50.69%	Y. S. Rajasekhara Reddy	INC	3,74,762	49.92	Kandula Rajamohana Reddy	TDP	3,20,881	42.74	53,881	7.18
24	Hindupur	43.16%	S. Gangadhar	INC	2,84,096	42.32	S. Ramachandra Reddy	TDP	2,57,958	38.43	26,138	3.89
25	Anantapur	47.65%	Anantha V. Reddy	INC	3,20,474	46.57	K. Ramakrishna	CPI	2,38,076	34.60	82,398	11.97
26	Kurnool	48.91%	K. Vijaya Bhaskara Reddy	INC	3,68,044	48.01	K. E. Krishna Murthy	TDP	3,55,208	46.34	12,836	1.67
27	Nandyal	48.47%	Bhuma Nagi Reddy	TDP	3,38,100	47.48	G. Prathap Reddy	INC	3,33,450	46.83	4,650	0.65
28	Nagarkurnool (SC)	42.82%	Mallu Ravi	INC	3,29,127	41.95	Manda Jagannath	TDP	3,09,452	39.45	19,675	2.50
29	Mahabubnagar	37.25%	Jaipal Reddy	JD	2,78,302	36.57	Mallikarjun Goud	INC	2,55,661	33.59	22,641	2.98
30	Hyderabad	44.65%	Sultan Salahuddin Owaisi	AIMIM	4,85,785	44.06	Baddam Bal Reddy	BJP	4,14,173	37.56	71,612	6.50
31	Secunderabad	49.02%	Bandaru Dattatreya	BJP	4,38,586	48.37	P. V. Rajeshwar Rao	INC	2,52,676	27.87	1,85,910	20.50
32	Siddipet (SC)	35.30%	Malyala Rajaiah	TDP	3,48,194	34.67	Nandi Yellaiah	INC	3,37,169	33.57	11,025	1.10
33	Medak	34.12%	M. Baga Reddy	INC	2,69,122	33.49	Ale Narendra	BJP	2,52,642	31.44	16,480	2.05
34	Nizamabad	38.48%	G. Ganga Reddy	TDP	2,81,851	37.81	Atmacharan Reddy Gaddam	BJP	2,49,095	33.41	32,756	4.40
35	Adilabad	39.49%	S. Venugopala Chary	TDP	2,91,168	38.68	Allola Indrakaran	INC	2,57,634	34.22	33,534	4.46
36	Peddapalli (SC)	39.71%	C. Suguna Kumari	TDP	3,22,801	38.80	G. Venkatswamy	INC	3,16,627	38.06	6,174	0.74
37	Karimnagar	42.83%	C. Vidyasagar Rao	BJP	3,29,030	41.95	L. Ramana	TDP	2,33,033	29.71	95,997	12.24
38	Hanamkonda	47.04%	C. Suresh Reddy	TDP	2,87,277	45.56	Kamaluddin Ahmed	INC	2,41,786	38.35	45,491	7.21
39	Warangal	41.43%	Azmeera Chandulal	TDP	3,23,093	40.71	T. Kalpana Devi	INC	2,98,292	37.59	24,801	3.12
40	Khammam	40.30%	N. Bhaskara Rao	INC	3,63,747	39.65	T. Veerabhadram	CPM	3,52,083	38.38	11,664	1.27
41	Nalgonda	35.18%	S. Sudhakar Reddy	CPI	3,14,983	34.59	V. Hanumantha Rao	INC	2,90,528	31.90	24,455	2.69
42	Miryalguda	39.07%	Baddam N. Reddy	INC	3,34,183	38.42	C. Seetha Ramulu	CPM	3,19,685	36.76	14,498	1.66

== See also ==
- Elections in Andhra Pradesh
