= 1999 Indian general election in Andhra Pradesh =

42 seats
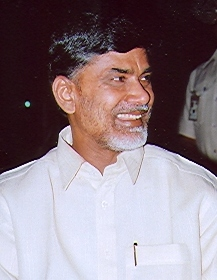

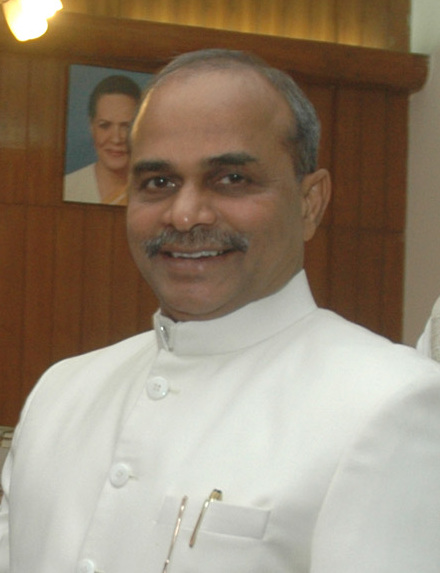
	First party	Second party
Leader	N. Chandrababu Naidu	Y.S. Rajasekhara Reddy
Party	TDP	INC
Alliance	NDA	INC +
Leader's seat	Did not contest	Did not contest
Last election	12	22
Seats won	29	5
Seat change	▲17	▼17
Percentage	42.80%	39.90%
Swing	▲4.51%	▲1.44%
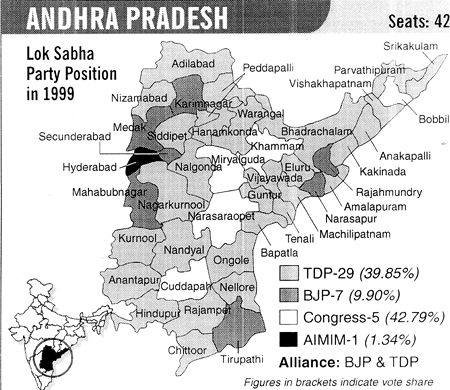
- Lok Sabha party position in 1999 (Andhra Pradesh)
Prime Minister before election
Atal Bihari Vajpayee
BJP
Prime Minister after election
Atal Bihari Vajpayee
BJP

The 1999 Indian general election in Andhra Pradesh were held for 42 seats in the state. The result was a landslide victory for the National Democratic Alliance and its ally Telugu Desam Party, which together won 36 out of 42 seats.

== Election schedule ==
The polling schedule for the 1999 General Elections was announced by the Chief Election Commissioner on 11 July 1999.

Poll event	Phase		
Poll event	I	II	III
Notification date	11 August 1999	17 August 1999	21 August 1999
Last date for filing nomination	18 August 1999	24 August 1999	28 August 1999
Scrutiny of nomination	19 August 1999	25 August 1999	30 August 1999
Last Date for withdrawal of nomination	21 August 1999	27 August 1999	1 September 1999
Date of poll	5 September 1999	11 September 1999	18 September 1999
Date of counting of votes/Result	6 October 1999		
No. of constituencies	13	15	14

== Parties and alliances ==
Alliance/Party		Flag	Symbol	Leader	Seats contested	
NDA	Telugu Desam Party			N. Chandrababu Naidu	34	42
NDA	Bharatiya Janata Party			Vidyasagar Rao	8	42
Indian National Congress				Y. S. Rajasekhara Reddy	42	
LF	Anna Telugu Desam Party			Nandamuri Harikrishna	20	33
LF	Communist Party of India (Marxist)			Babu Rao Mediyam	7	33
LF	Communist Party of India			Sudhakar Reddy	6	33
All India Majlis-e-Ittehadul Muslimeen				Sultan Salahuddin Owaisi	1	

== List of Candidates ==
Constituency		NDA		INC		CPI(M) + CPI	
#	Name	Party	Candidate	Party	Candidate	Party	Candidate
1	Srikakulam	TDP	Kinjarapu Yerran Naidu	INC	Kanithi Viswanatham		
2	Parvathipuram (ST)	TDP	D. V. G. Sankara Rao	INC	Kishore Chandra Deo		
3	Bobbili	TDP	Padala Aruna	INC	Botcha Satyanarayana		
4	Visakhapatnam	TDP	M. V. V. S. Murthi	INC	T. Subbarami Reddy	CPM	Ch. Narsinga Rao
5	Bhadrachalam (ST)	TDP	Dumpa Mary Vijayakumari	INC	T. Ratna Bai	CPI	Sode Ramaiah
6	Anakapalli	TDP	Ganta Srinivasa Rao	INC	G. Gurunadha Rao		
7	Kakinada	TDP	M. Padmanabha Reddy	INC	Thota Subbarao		
8	Rajahmundry	BJP	Satyanarayana Rao	INC	Chitturi Ravindra		
9	Amalapuram (SC)	TDP	G. M. C. Balayogi	INC	Gollapalli Suryarao		
10	Narasapur	BJP	Krishnam Raju	INC	Kanumuri Bapi Raju	CPM	R. Satyanarayana Raju
11	Eluru	TDP	Bolla Bulli Ramaiah	INC	M. Venkateswara Rao		
12	Machilipatnam	TDP	Ambati Brahmanaiah	INC	Kavuri Samba Siva Rao		
13	Vijayawada	TDP	Gadde Rama Mohan	INC	P. Upendra	CPI	Kolli Nageswara Rao
14	Tenali	TDP	Ummareddy Venkateswarlu	INC	P. Shiv Shankar	CPM	Parchuri Nageswara Rao
15	Guntur	TDP	Y. Venkateswara Rao	INC	R. Sambasiva Rao		
16	Bapatla	TDP	D. Ramanaidu	INC	Jesudasu Seelam		
17	Narasaraopet	TDP	S. M. Lal Janbasha	INC	N. Janardhana Reddy		
18	Ongole	TDP	Balaram Krishna Murthy	INC	M. Sreenivasulu Reddy		
19	Nellore (SC)	TDP	Vukkala Rajeswaramma	INC	Panabaka Lakshmi	CPM	T. Prapancha Bhanu Raju
20	Tirupati (SC)	BJP	Dr. N. Venkataswamy	INC	Chinta Mohan		
21	Chittoor	TDP	N. Ramakrishna Reddy	INC	R. Gopinath		
22	Rajampet	TDP	Gunipati Ramaiah	INC	Annayyagari Sai Prathap		
23	Cuddapah	TDP	Kandula Rajamohan Reddy	INC	Y. S. Vivekananda Reddy		
24	Hindupur	TDP	B. K. Parthasarathi	INC	S. Gangadhar		
25	Anantapur	TDP	Kalava Srinivasulu	INC	Venkatarami Reddy		
26	Kurnool	TDP	K. E. Krishna Murthy	INC	Vijaya Bhaskara Reddy		
27	Nandyal	TDP	Bhuma Nagi Reddy	INC	G. Prathap Reddy		
28	Nagarkurnool (SC)	TDP	Manda Jagannath	INC	Mallu Ravi		
29	Mahabubnagar	BJP	A. P. Jithender Reddy	INC	Dr. Mallikarjun		
30	Hyderabad	BJP	Baddam Bal Reddy	INC	Konda Lakshma Reddy		
31	Secunderabad	BJP	Bandaru Dattatreya	INC	N. Bhaskara Rao		
32	Siddipet (SC)	TDP	Malyala Rajaiah	INC	Nandi Yellaiah		
33	Medak	BJP	A. Narendra	INC	M. Baga Reddy		
34	Nizamabad	TDP	Gaddam Ganga Reddy	INC	S. Santosh Reddy		
35	Adilabad	TDP	Samudrala Venugopal Chary	INC	Mohd. Sultan Ahmad	CPI	C. Shanker Rao
36	Peddapalli (SC)	TDP	Chellamalla Suguna Kumari	INC	Gaddam Venkatswamy	CPI	Yerrala Gattaiah
37	Karimnagar	BJP	C. Vidyasagar Rao	INC	Anand Rao Chelimeda		
38	Hanamkonda	TDP	Chada Suresh Reddy	INC	M. Kamaluddin Ahmed	CPI	Kalidas Madatha
39	Warangal	TDP	Bodakunti Venkateshwarlu	INC	T. Kalpana Devi	CPM	Gollapelly Nagaiah
40	Khammam	TDP	M. Baby Swarna Kumari	INC	Renuka Chowdhury	CPM	Guguloth Dharma
41	Nalgonda	TDP	Gutha Sukender Reddy	INC	K. Janardhan Reddy	CPI	Sudhakar Reddy
42	Miryalguda	TDP	Yadevelli Rangasai Reddy	INC	Jaipal Reddy	CPM	Cherupalli Seetharamulu

== Voting and results ==
=== Results by alliance ===
Alliance/ Party		Popular vote			Seats		
Alliance/ Party		Votes	%	±pp	Contested	Won	+/−
NDA	TDP	1,32,97,370	39.85	▲7.88	34	29	▲17
NDA	BJP	33,03,772	9.90	▼8.40	8	7	▲3
NDA	Total	1,66,01,142	49.75	Steady	42	36	Steady
INC		1,42,78,099	42.79	▲4.33	42	5	▼17
CPI(M)		4,67,959	1.40	▼1.49	7	0	Steady
CPI		4,43,775	1.33	▼1.23	6	0	▼2
AIMIM		4,48,165	1.34	▼0.18	1	1	Steady
Others		6,55,149	1.98	Steady	85	0	Steady
IND		4,71,195	1.41	▼0.28	102	0	Steady
Total		3,33,65,484	100%	-	285	42	-

== List of elected members ==
Constituency		Winner				Runner Up				Margin	%
#	Name	Candidate	Party	Votes	%	Candidate	Party	Votes	%	Margin	%
1	Srikakulam	Kinjarapu Yerran Naidu	TDP	373,851	56.81	Kanithi Viswanatham	INC	276,969	42.09	96,882	14.72
2	Parvathipuram (ST)	D. V. G. Sankara Rao	TDP	304,000	49.54	Kishore Chandra Deo	INC	290,719	47.38	13,281	2.16
3	Bobbili	Botsa Satyanarayana	INC	339,768	48.95	Aruna Padala	TDP	335,947	48.40	3,821	0.55
4	Visakhapatnam	M. V. V. S. Murthi	TDP	442,036	49.96	T. Subbarami Reddy	INC	403,117	45.56	38,919	4.40
5	Bhadrachalam (ST)	Dumpa Vijayakumari	TDP	293,593	40.30	T. Ratna Bai	INC	256,490	35.21	37,103	5.09
6	Anakapalli	Ganta Srinivasa Rao	TDP	392,984	52.75	Gudivada Gurunadha Rao	INC	334,520	44.90	58,464	7.85
7	Kakinada	M. Padmanabha Reddy	TDP	435,811	53.64	Thota Subbarao	INC	314,376	38.69	121,435	14.95
8	Rajahmundry	Satyanarayana Rao	BJP	411,956	51.73	Chitturi Ravindra	INC	351,925	44.20	60,031	7.53
9	Amalapuram (SC)	G. M. C. Balayogi	TDP	368,476	55.56	Gollapalli Suryarao	INC	249,597	37.63	118,879	17.93
10	Narasapur	Krishnam Raju	BJP	421,099	59.78	Kanumuru Bapiraju	INC	255,151	36.22	165,948	23.56
11	Eluru	Bolla Bulli Ramaiah	TDP	435,884	52.23	Maganti V. Rao	INC	373,653	44.78	62,231	7.45
12	Machilipatnam	Ambati Brahmanaiah	TDP	387,533	54.44	Kavuri Samba Siva Rao	INC	304,537	42.78	82,996	11.66
13	Vijayawada	Gadde Rama Mohan	TDP	482,968	51.96	P. Upendra	INC	395,902	42.59	87,066	9.37
14	Tenali	Ummareddy Venkateswarlu	TDP	339,800	52.63	P. Shiv Shankar	INC	266,771	41.32	73,029	11.31
15	Guntur	Y. Venkateswara Rao	TDP	399,065	51.08	Rayapati Sambasiva Rao	INC	358,735	45.92	40,330	5.16
16	Bapatla	D. Ramanaidu	TDP	399,596	55.83	Jesudasu Seelam	INC	307,139	42.92	92,457	12.91
17	Narasaraopet	N. Janardhana Reddy	INC	432,266	50.27	S. M. Laljan Basha	TDP	418,384	48.66	13,882	1.61
18	Ongole	Karanam Murthy	TDP	392,840	50.58	Sreenivasulu Reddy	INC	370,892	47.76	21,948	2.82
19	Nellore (SC)	Vukkala Rajeswaramma	TDP	381,166	49.51	Panabaka Lakshmi	INC	340,713	44.26	40,453	5.25
20	Tirupathi (SC)	N. Venkataswamy	BJP	386,478	48.89	Chinta Mohan	INC	373,981	47.31	12,497	1.58
21	Chittoor	N. Ramakrishna Reddy	TDP	419,208	50.18	R. Gopinath	INC	400,570	47.95	18,638	2.23
22	Rajampet	Gunipati Ramaiah	TDP	322,107	48.76	Annayyagari Sai Prathap	INC	294,937	44.65	27,170	4.11
23	Cuddapah	Y. S. Vivekananda Reddy	INC	367,833	50.89	K. Rajamohan Reddy	TDP	341,236	47.21	26,597	3.68
24	Hindupur	B. K. Parthasarathi	TDP	432,575	56.25	S. Gangadhar	INC	297,939	38.74	134,636	17.51
25	Anantapur	Kalava Srinivasulu	TDP	378,488	50.27	Anantha Reddy	INC	357,386	47.47	21,102	2.8
26	Kurnool	Kambhalapati Murthy	TDP	385,688	51.27	Vijaya Bhaskara Reddy	INC	361,201	48.01	24,487	3.26
27	Nandyal	Bhuma Nagi Reddy	TDP	391,655	53.68	G. Prathap Reddy	INC	319,046	43.73	72,609	9.95
28	Nagarkurnool (SC)	Manda Jagannath	TDP	431,095	53.11	Mallu Ravi	INC	364,195	44.87	66,900	8.24
29	Mahabubnagar	A. P. Jithender Reddy	BJP	391,588	49.46	Dr. Mallikarjun	INC	340,693	43.03	50,895	6.43
30	Hyderabad	Sultan Salahuddin Owaisi	AIMIM	448,165	41.36	Baddam Bal Reddy	BJP	387,344	35.74	60,821	5.62
31	Secunderabad	Bandaru Dattatreya	BJP	506,626	52.19	N. Bhaskara Rao	INC	409,000	42.13	97,626	10.06
32	Siddipet (SC)	Malyala Rajaiah	TDP	583,346	55.95	Nandi Yellaiah	INC	429,625	41.21	153,721	14.74
33	Medak	Ale Narendra	BJP	400,244	48.20	Mogaligundla Reddy	INC	378,161	45.54	22,083	2.66
34	Nizamabad	Gaddam Ganga Reddy	TDP	373,260	49.51	S. Santosh Reddy	INC	369,824	49.05	3,436	0.46
35	Adilabad	Samudrala Venugopal Chary	TDP	390,308	52.49	Mohd. Sultan Ahmad	INC	280,585	37.73	109,723	14.76
36	Peddapalli (SC)	Chellamalla Suguna Kumari	TDP	406,529	47.24	Gaddam Venkatswamy	INC	390,640	45.39	15,889	1.85
37	Karimnagar	C. Vidyasagar Rao	BJP	398,437	49.73	Anand Rao Chelimeda	INC	379,067	47.31	19,370	2.42
38	Hanamkonda	Chada Suresh Reddy	TDP	375,285	51.56	Kamaluddin Ahmed	INC	289,504	39.78	85,781	11.78
39	Warangal	Bodakunti Venkateshwarlu	TDP	385,593	46.35	T. Kalpana Devi	INC	372,227	44.74	13,366	1.61
40	Khammam	Renuka Chowdhury	INC	328,596	35.85	Baby Swarna Maddineni	TDP	320,198	34.93	8,398	0.92
41	Nalgonda	Gutha Sukender Reddy	TDP	427,505	44.97	Janardhan Reddy	INC	347,770	36.58	79,735	8.39
42	Miryalguda	Jaipal Reddy	INC	401,437	44.12	Rangashai Yadevelli	TDP	349,360	38.40	52,077	5.72

== Post-election Union Council of Ministers from Andhra Pradesh ==
SI No.	Name	Constituency	Designation	Department	From	To	Party
1	C. Vidyasagar Rao	Karimnagar	Minister of State	Home Affairs	13 October 1999	29 January 2003	BJP
1	C. Vidyasagar Rao	Karimnagar	Minister of State	Commerce and Industry	29 January 2003	22 May 2004	BJP
2	Bandaru Dattatreya	Secunderabad	Minister of State	Urban Development	13 October 1999	14 June 2000	BJP
2	Bandaru Dattatreya	Secunderabad	Minister of State	Urban Development and Poverty Alleviation	14 June 2000	1 July 2002	BJP
2	Bandaru Dattatreya	Secunderabad	Minister of State	Railways	1 July 2002	8 September 2003	BJP
2	Bandaru Dattatreya	Secunderabad	Minister of State (Independent Charge)	Urban Development and Poverty Alleviation	8 September 2003	22 May 2004	BJP
3	S. B. P. B. K. Satyanarayana Rao	Rajahmundry	Minister of State	Agriculture	13 October 1999	29 September 2000	BJP
4	U. V. Krishnam Raju	Narasapur	Minister of State	External Affairs	30 September 2000	22 July 2001	BJP
4	U. V. Krishnam Raju	Narasapur	Minister of State	Defence	22 July 2001	1 July 2002	BJP
4	U. V. Krishnam Raju	Narasapur	Minister of State	Consumer Affairs, Food and Public Distribution	1 July 2002	29 September 2003	BJP
4	U. V. Krishnam Raju	Narasapur	Minister of State	Rural Development	29 January 2003	22 May 2004	BJP

== Assembly Segment wise lead ==
Party	Assembly segments	Position in Assembly (as of 1999 election)
Telugu Desam Party	162	180
Indian National Congress	88	91
Bharatiya Janata Party	37	12
All India Majlis-e-Ittehadul Muslimeen	4	4
Communist Party of India (Marxist)	1	2
Communist Party of India	1	0
Others	1	5
Total	294	
