= Anna Telugu Desam Party =

Defunct Indian political party

- Abbreviation: ATDP
- President: Nandamuri Harikrishna
- Founder: Nandamuri Harikrishna
- Founded: 27 January 1999 (27 years ago)
- Split from: Telugu Desam Party
- Colours: Lime
- ECI status: Delisted

Election symbol
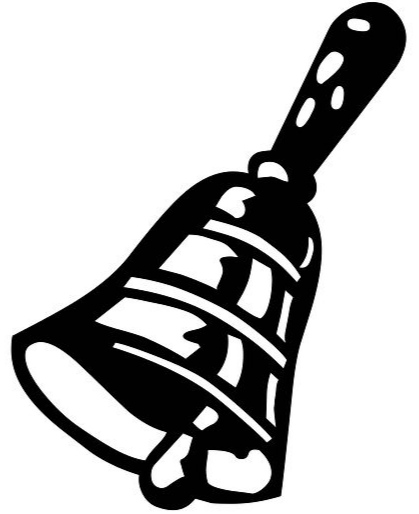
- Bell

The Anna Telugu Desam Party (abbr. ATDP) was a regional political party in the Indian state of Andhra Pradesh. It was founded by Nandamuri Harikrishna, the third son of the film star and Telugu Desam Party (TDP) founder N. T. Rama Rao (NTR) on 27 January 1999. The party was formed following internal differences within the TDP but struggled to make an electoral impact. Harikrishna eventually returned to the TDP in 2006, and ATDP was delisted by the Election Commission of India in 2016.

== History ==
Nandamuri Harikrishna established the Anna Telugu Desam Party (ATDP) on 27 January 1999 after a fallout with TDP leader N. Chandrababu Naidu. Harikrishna had previously sided with Naidu along with the majority of TDP legislators, during the 1995 internal coup within the TDP, which led to his father NTR's removal as party leader, triggered by dissatisfaction with the involvement of NTR's second wife, Lakshmi Parvathi in party and state affairs. Following the coup, Harikrishna was appointed as the Minister of Transport in the Government of Andhra Pradesh. However, dissatisfaction with Naidu's leadership led him to part ways and establish ATDP.

Shortly after its formation, Rajya Sabha MP Daggubati Venkateswara Rao left the Bharatiya Janata Party (BJP) to join ATDP on 28 January 1999. Another Rajya Sabha MP, Yarlagadda Lakshmi Prasad, also joined the party, giving the party two seats in the upper house of the Parliament of India. S. Madhusudhana Chary, who had earlier been a member of the NTR Telugu Desam Party (Lakshmi Parvathi), represented ATDP in the Andhra Pradesh Legislative Assembly.

In the lead-up to the 1999 Andhra Pradesh Legislative Assembly election, ATDP formed an alliance with the Communist Party of India and the Communist Party of India (Marxist), both of which had been former allies of the TDP. However, internal disagreements over ATDP's stance on banning foreign-born individuals, including Sonia Gandhi, from holding the Prime Minister's position created a rift within the alliance.

ATDP fielded 191 candidates in the 1999 election but failed to win any seats, securing only 371,718 votes, 1.12% of the total votes in the state. In the simultaneously conducted 1999 Indian general election, the party contested 20 constituencies but again failed to secure any seats, receiving only 244,045 votes, 0.73% of the total votes in the state.

The party's failure to make an electoral impact led to its decline. By 2006, Harikrishna returned to the TDP and was elected to the Rajya Sabha as a TDP member in 2008. Over the years, ATDP's relevance diminished, and in 2016, the party was officially delisted by the Election Commission of India.

== Electoral performance ==
Lok Sabha elections
Year	Lok Sabha	Party leader	Seats contested	Seats won	Change in seats	(%) of votes	Vote swing	Popular vote	Outcome
1999	13th	Nandamuri Harikrishna	20	0 / 543	new	0.73	new	244,045	Lost

Andhra Pradesh Legislative Assembly elections
Year	Assembly	Party leader	Seats contested	Seats won	Change in seats	(%) of votes	Vote swing	Popular vote	Outcome
1999	11th	Nandamuri Harikrishna	191	0 / 294	new	1.12	new	371,718	Lost

== See also ==
- Politics of India
- Elections in India
- Politics of Andhra Pradesh
- Elections in Andhra Pradesh
- List of political parties in India
