= Nimma Raja Reddy =

Indian politician

- Born: 9 March 1937; Warangal, Andhra Pradesh (now in Telangana)
- Died: 19 October 2009 (aged 72); Cherial, Warangal District, Andhra Pradesh, (Now in Telangana) India
- Resting place: Veldhanda, Cheriyal, Warangal
- Occupations: MLA, Former Minister, Politician
- Spouse: Nimma Rama Devi

Nimma Raja Reddy, also spelled in the media as Nimma Raji Reddy, (9 March 1937, Warangal, Andhra Pradesh – 19 October 2009, Cherial, Warangal Dist.), was an Indian politician and a MLA Member of the Andhra Pradesh Legislative Assembly for three decades from Cheriyal constituency. He also served as a Minister of Andhra Pradesh.

== Political roles ==
He entered politics in 1962 at the age of 25 as an independent without any political background.

- 1962–64 – For two years he was Sarpanch for Veldhanda, Cherial, Warangal
- 1964–1978 – For 14 years Panchayat Raj Samithi President, Narmetta, Cherial, Warangal
- 1978 – Contested in Assembly elections for the first time
- 1978–1982 – Bank Chairman, Cherial, Warangal
- 1982 – Joined N. T. Rama Rao's Telugu Desam Party (TDP)
- 1978–1999 – Served 21 years as an MLA Member of Andhra Pradesh Assembly, representing Telugu Desam Party, from Cherial constituency

== Political life ==
Nimma Raja Reddy, a lawyer by profession, from the age of 25 served his region for more than four decades in various roles. He first won as village sarpanch and later as Samithi president and then as a Bank Chairman. For the first time he contested Assembly elections in year 1978. After that he contested in 1983 and won consecutively on four occasions for the Telugu Desam Party. He served as MLA representing Cherial constituency, in Warangal district for two decades and also served as a minister for two portfolios, Finance Minister and Power and Handlooms Minister in the Government of Andhra Pradesh.

In 1999, after Chandrababu Naidu's coup on N. T. Rama Rao, Naidu declined an assembly ticket to Nimma Raja Reddy for not supporting the coup and for backing the founder of the party N. T. Rama Rao. From then on until the end of Cherial constituency merger with Jangaon constituency, no leader representing Telugu Desam Party won Cherial constituency.

Nimma Raja Reddy's opposition to Chandrababu Naidu proved very costly for the Telugu Desam Party in Cherial constituency. He also strongly supported the Telangana movement, and then also supported the Bharat Rashtra Samithi party after its foundation. In April 2004, Naidu expelled him from the party along with three other senior members, Dharoor Pullaiah and C. Lakshmi Narasimha Reddy. In the 2009 assembly elections, when Bharat Rashtra Samithi made an alliance with Telugu Desam Party, he opposed it and joined the Indian National Congress to show his hostility against Chandrababu Naidu. He played a very crucial role in helping Ponnala Laxmiah from Congress Party to win 2009 Assembly Elections in the New Jangaon Merger Cherial constituency.

== Death ==
Nimma Raja Reddy suffered a severe heart attack on 19 October 2009 in Cherial, Warangal Dist.
