= Amar Mitra =

Amar Mitra may refer to

- Amar Mitra Peddireddy, Indian politician
- Amar Mitra (writer), Bengali writer
