= Biddika Satyanarayana =

Indian politician

Member of Parliament, Lok Sabha
- In office 1962-1967
- Preceded by: Dippala Suri Dora
- Succeeded by: Viswasarai Narasimha Rao Dora
- In office 1971-1977
- Preceded by: Viswasarai Narasimha Rao Dora
- Succeeded by: Kishore Chandra Suryanarayana Deo Vyricherla
- Constituency: Parvathipuram

Personal details
- Party: Indian National Congress

Biddika Satyanarayana was an Indian politician. He was a Member of Parliament, representing Parvathipuram in the Lok Sabha, the lower house of India's Parliament, as a member of the Indian National Congress.
