= Politics of Andhra Pradesh =

Political system of Andhra Pradesh

The Politics of Andhra Pradesh take place in the context of a bicameral parliamentary system within the Constitutional framework of India. The main parties in the state are the Telugu Desam Party (TDP), Janasena Party (JSP), and YSR Congress Party (YSRCP). Other parties that have small presence in the state include the Bharatiya Janata Party (BJP), Indian National Congress (INC), and Left parties, including both Communist Party of India (Marxist) (CPI(M)) and Communist Party of India (CPI).

N. Chandrababu Naidu is the incumbent Chief Minister.

== United Andhra Pradesh ==
The States Reorganisation Commission was appointed to prepare for the creation of states on linguistic lines. Thus, merging the Telugu-speaking region of Hyderabad State (Telangana) with Telugu-speaking state of Andhra state, the Central Government, established a unified Andhra Pradesh on 1 November 1956.

=== 1953–1983 ===
The Indian National Congress party won all the state elections from the emergence of the state on 1 October 1953 till 1983. Projects like Nagarjuna Sagar and Srisailam Dams were constructed during this time. There were ten different Chief Ministers from the formation of the state in 1956 till 1983.

==== Telangana movement ====
Marri Chenna Reddy formed the Telangana Praja Samithi party to lead the Telangana movement. In November 1969, there was a major split in the party which eventually led to the downfall of the movement. He resigned his position to make room for a leader from Telangana to become the Chief Minister. On 30 September 1971, P. V. Narasimha Rao became the Chief Minister.

==== Jai Andhra movement ====
Jai Andhra movement is a 1972 political movement in support for the creation of Andhra state in the light of injustices felt by the people of the Coastal Andhra and Rayalaseema Regions. This was after the HC and SC upheld the Mulki rules in existence at the time. This disenfranchised a vast majority of the population of the state from obtaining jobs in their own state capital. In ensuing protests and police firing eight people were killed. Over 400 people sacrificed their lives for the movement. One of the main opinions expressed was "Development is seen only in and around Hyderabad and it is time the coastal districts also develop rapidly".

Removal of Mulkhi rules and all other demands were met and a six-point formula was put in place. After nine ministers from Seemandhra region in the P. V. Narasimha Rao cabinet resigned, he had to resign as Chief minister of Andhra Pradesh on 10 January 1973, and President's rule was imposed in the state.

=== 1983–1989 ===
In 1983, N. T. Rama Rao (NTR), a popular Telugu actor, established his Telugu Desam Party (Telugu Desam, meaning Land of Telugus) with the support of people's dissent arising out of frequent changes in chief ministers of Andhra Pradesh by Prime Minister Indira Gandhi. He ran on a platform of "Telugu Pride". Within nine months of its founding, Telugu Desam was voted to power and NTR became the first "Non-Congress" Chief Minister of Andhra Pradesh.

Nadendla Bhaskara Rao broke with the party and formed a state government with the help of the opposition Congress(I). However his government lasted only 31 days as he did not command a majority in the Assembly. NTR was reinstated to power on 16 September 1984.

=== 1989–1994 ===
The Congress returned to power when Marri Chenna Reddy was sworn in for his second term as Chief Minister on 3 December 1989.The Congress lasted in power until the elections of 1994.

=== 1994–2004 ===
In the elections of 1994, N. T. Rama Rao's Telugu Desam Party ran advocating prohibition of alcohol in response to a women's movement. He had then recently married his second wife Lakshmi Parvathi. NTR's campaign focused on the rural areas which won him a significant majority in the state elections of 1995.

When NTR became the Chief Minister in 1994, he appointed one of his sons-in-law Nara Chandrababu Naidu as the Revenue Minister. Soon after the formation of the government, Naidu took the MLAs of NTR Cabinet in Viceroy Hotel, Hyderabad and convinced them to support him in order to save the TDP. NTR was dethroned and the TDP's leadership passed on to Chandrababu Naidu faction. The new NTR TDP (LP) party was formed by Lakshmi Parvati after NTR's death on 18 January 1996 in order to challenge Naidu's TDP. Chandrababu Naidu's TDP won the next elections with a huge majority.

=== 2004–2009 ===
Under Y. S. Rajasekhara Reddy (YSR), the Indian National Congress party won the 2004 elections as part of a coalition with TRS. During the run-up to the 2004 elections, Y.S Rajasekhara Reddy was able to bring a common platform and mutual agreement within the Andhra Pradesh unit of the Congress. His campaign took form of a three-month-long "padhayatra" or journey on foot. The elections resulted in the defeat of the then-ruling Telugu Desam Party under the leadership of N. Chandrababu Naidu. The Congress also won the municipal elections in 2005, district local body elections in 2006, and Panchayat Elections in 2006.

=== 2009–2014 ===
In the 2009 Andhra Pradesh general election the Indian National Congress under the leadership of YSR won a simple majority by winning 156 of 294 assembly seats. Telugu Desam Party gained a few more assembly seats than the previous election. Praja Rajyam Party founded by Chiranjeevi won 16% of the votes. The TRS and the Left parties in combination won less than 7% of the votes. Lok Satta Party won its first Assembly seat and captured more than 1% vote share.

As Rajasekhara Reddy died on 2 September 2009 in a helicopter crash, K. Rosaiah of the Indian National Congress took charge as Chief Minister of Andhra Pradesh. However Rosaiah resigned as Chief Minister on health grounds on 24 November 2010. The next day, Chief Minister Nallari Kiran Kumar Reddy of Indian National Congress took charges as Chief Minister of Andhra Pradesh.

==== Telangana movement ====
Kalvakuntla Chandrashekar Rao(KCR) started Telangana Rashtra Samithi(TRS) party in 2001 to lead the second phase of the Telangana movement which reached its peak during the period 2009–2014. This resulted in carving of the Telangana state on 2 June 2014. There was unsuccessful counter agitation in Rayalaseema and Coastal Andhra regions to stop the partition of the state.

== Present day Andhra Pradesh ==
=== 2014–2019 ===
On 2 June 2014 the aftermath of 14th Assembly general election, Telugu Desam Party won 104 seats out of 175 Seats. Telugu Actor turned politician Pawan Kalyan supported Bharatiya Janata Party-Telugu Desam Party coalition and N. Chandrababu Naidu became the first Chief Minister of bifurcated Andhra Pradesh defeating Y. S. Jagan Mohan Reddy of YSR Congress Party.

=== 2019–2024 ===
In the 2019 Andhra Pradesh Legislative Assembly election, the Telugu Desam Party contested alone, without any alliance. The Indian National Congress was earlier split into the INC and YSR Congress Party led by Y. S. Jagan Mohan Reddy. Jana Sena Party led by Pawan Kalyan also participated with an alliance with the CPI, CPI(M) and BSP. The TDP won only 23 seats while the YSR Congress Party swept the elections with a majority of 151 seats. Its leader Y. S. Jagan Mohan Reddy became the Chief Minister of Andhra Pradesh on 30 May 2019. Jana Sena Party won only 1 seat with 5.43% vote share in the state.

=== 2024 to present ===
In the 2024 Andhra Pradesh Legislative Assembly election, the TDP formed an alliance with the JSP and BJP under the NDA alliance. The NDA secured a sweeping victory with a majority of 164 seats, while the incumbent YSRCP managed to win only 11 out of 175 seats, failing to secure the role of opposition in the state. N. Chandrababu Naidu, leader of the TDP and the three-time Chief Minister of Andhra Pradesh, assumed the office for the fourth time on 12 June 2024. The JSP, which won all the 21 seats they contested, got its leader Pawan Kalyan appointed as Deputy Chief Minister of Andhra Pradesh.

== See also ==
- Andhra Pradesh Reorganisation Act, 2014
- List of chief ministers of Andhra Pradesh
- Government of Andhra Pradesh
- Elections in Andhra Pradesh
