= B. Radhabai Ananda Rao =

Indian politician (1930–1991)

Member of Parliament
- In office 1967–1984
- Succeeded by: Sode Ramaiah
- Constituency: Bhadrachalam (Lok Sabha constituency)

Personal details
- Born: 2 February 1930 Venkatapuram, Andhra Pradesh
- Died: 17 April 1991 (aged 61)
- Party: Indian National Congress
- Spouse: B. K. Ananda Rao
- Children: 1 son and 2 daughters

B. Radhabai Ananda Rao (2 February 1930 – 17 April 1991) was an Indian politician who was a Member of Parliament from 1967 to 1984.

== Life and career ==
B. Radhabai Ananda Rao was born at Venkatapuram village in Khammam district on 2 February 1930. She was educated at Rajahmundry Tutorial College and Rajahmundry Teachers' Training School, Rajahmundry.

Rao was elected from Bhadrachalam (Lok Sabha constituency) as a member of Indian National Congress for the 4th Lok Sabha in 1967 and also the four successive times until 1985.

On 6 June 1952, she married B. K. Ananda Rao; they had a son and two daughters. She was an agriculturist and worked as family planning instructor in Singareni Collieries between 1957 and 1967. Rao was Member of Indian National Trade Union Congress, 1962–64 and Parents' Association, Zila Parishad High School, Ramavaram and Member, Panchayat Samiti, Kothagudem, 1957. She took active part in propagating Family Planning schemes in Singareni Collieries and other tribal areas and also worked for the welfare of the tribal people.

Rao was a member of the Committee on Government Assurances and intensively toured foreign countries in a parliamentary delegation.

B. Radhabai Ananda Rao died on 17 April 1991, at the age of 61.
