= Cherupally Seetha Ramulu =

Indian politician

Cherupally Seetha Ramulu is an Indian politician from Telangana. He served as a member of the Andhra Pradesh Legislative Council under the MLAs quota from 2 November 2007 to 29 March 2013. He was the floor leader of CPI(M) in the Legislative Council. He was a state secretariat member of the Communist Party of India (Marxist), Telangana, from 2014 till 28 January 2025. He was also a member of the Central Committee of the Communist Party of India (Marxist) from 19 April 2015 to 6 April 2025. He was the candidate from the Miryalguda Lok Sabha constituency in 1998 and 1999, and from the Bhongir Lok Sabha constituency in 2014 but didn't manage to win any.
