= Chandupatla Janga Reddy =

Indian politician (1935–2022)

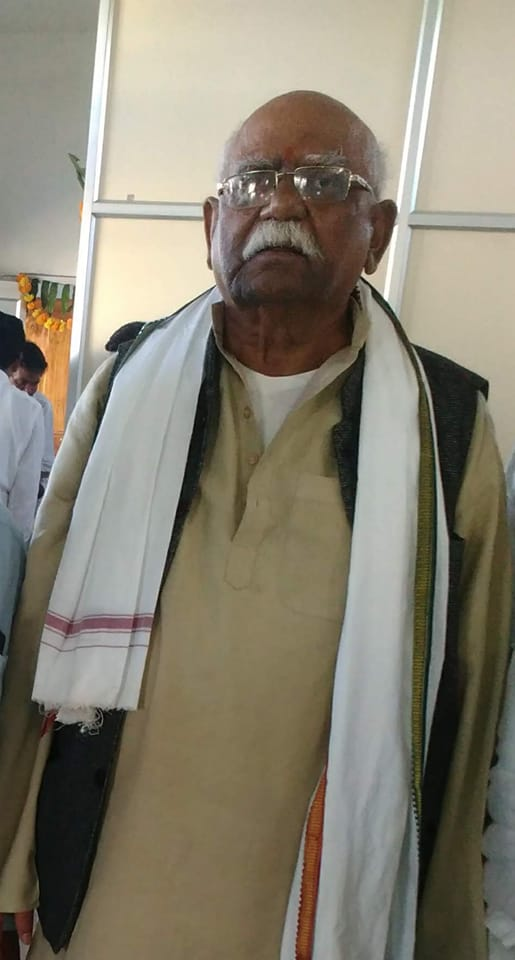

Member of Parliament, Lok Sabha
- In office 1984–1988
- Preceded by: P. V. Narasimha Rao
- Succeeded by: Kamaluddin Ahmed
- Constituency: Hanamkonda

Member of Andhra Pradesh Legislative Assembly
- In office 1978–1984
- Preceded by: constituency established
- Succeeded by: Namidi Narsimha Reddy
- Constituency: Shyampet
- In office 1967–1972
- Preceded by: Rauthu Narsimha Ramiah
- Succeeded by: Pingali Dharma Reddy
- Constituency: Parkal

Personal details
- Born: 18 November 1935 Parkala Village, Parkala Thaluk, Warangal District, Hyderabad state
- Died: 5 February 2022 (aged 86) Hyderabad, Telangana, India
- Party: Bharatiya Janata Party
- Spouse: C. Sudeshma
- Children: 3
- Education: B.A.
- Occupation: Chairman of Vaagdevi Group of Institutions

Chandupatla Janga Reddy (18 November 1935 – 5 February 2022) was an Indian politician and member of the Bharatiya Janata Party. He was elected to the 8th Lok Sabha, the lower house of the Parliament of India from Hanamkonda, Andhra Pradesh defeating the future Prime Minister P. V. Narasimha Rao in 1984. He helped many poor students with their education. He was the co-founder of Vaagdevi Group of Institutions.

== Early life ==
Reddy was born 18 November 1935. He worked as a teacher in Parkala Village, located in the Warangal District of Andhra Pradesh (now part of Telangana), for ten years ending in 1967.

== Political career ==
He was a member of the Bharatiya Janata Party. He was a member of the Andhra Pradesh Legislative Assembly in 1967–72 (from Parkal as Jana Sangh member), 1978–83 (from Shyampet as Janata Party member) and 1983–84 (from Shyampet as member of BJP). He was arrested in 1970 for leading a group in Delhi in support of the recognition of Bangladesh, and imprisoned under the Maintenance of Internal Security Act (MISA) from 14 November 1975 to 18 December 1976 during emergency period.

He is best known for his time as Member of Parliament in the 8th Lok Sabha in 1984. That year the Bharatiya Janata Party won just two of the 543 Parliament constituencies; one was won by Chendupatla Janga Reddy, representing Hanamkonda in the then undivided Andhra Pradesh, and the other by AK Patel, representing Mehsana, Gujarat. He took active part in the Telangana Satyagraha Movement and anti-Malappuram district agitation in Kerala. He participated in the satyagraha in Delhi against the deployment of the army to the Golden Temple in 1984.

He was an active member of Rashtriya Swayamsevak Sangh and held many offices in the Andhra Pradesh Student Union, including Executive Member. He resided in Hanamakonda, Warangal.

== Personal life and death ==
Reddy married C. Sudeshma in 1953, with whom he had two sons and one daughter. Reddy died in Hyderabad on 5 February 2022, at the age of 86.
