= Babu Rao Mediyam =

Indian politician

Member of Parliament Lok Sabha
- In office 2004–2009
- Preceded by: Dumpa Mary Vijayakumari
- Succeeded by: Constituency Abolished
- Constituency: Bhadrachalam

Personal details
- Born: 10 July 1951 (age 75) Pedanallilballi, Andhra Pradesh
- Party: Communist Party of India (Marxist)
- Spouse: Gowthami
- Children: 2 sons and 1 daughter

Babu Rao Mediyam (born 10 July 1951) is an Indian politician. He was a member of the 14th Lok Sabha. He represented the Bhadrachalam (Lok Sabha constituency) constituency of Andhra Pradesh and is a member of the Communist Party of India (Marxist). The Bhadrachalam (Lok Sabha constituency) has been reserved for scheduled tribes.
