= Lakkavaram =

- Village
- Interactive map of Lakkavaram
- Location in Andhra Pradesh, India
- Coordinates: 15.698285°N 79.794474°E
- Country: India
- State: Andhra Pradesh
- District: Prakasam district

Government
  - Type: democratic
  - Body: ap gov

Population (2011)
  - Total: 9,222
  - Density: 2,400/km^{2} (6,200/sq mi)

Languages
  - Official: Telugu
- Time zone: UTC+5:30 (IST)
- PIN: 523264
- Vehicle registration: AP05
- Sex ratio: 1:1 ♂/♀

Lakkavaram is a village in Talluru Mandal in the Prakasam district in the state of Andhra Pradesh, India.

== Notable people ==
Politician Karredula Kamala Kumari was born in Lakkavaram.
