= Kamineni Eswara Rao =

Indian weightlifter (1918–2007)

Personal information
- National team: India
- Born: 26 August 1918 Bhatlapenumarru, Krishna district, Madras Presidency, British India
- Died: 7 November 2007 (aged 89) Bhatlapenumarru, Krishna district, Andhra Pradesh, India

Sport
- Country: India
- Sport: Weightlifting
- Weight class: Men's middle heavyweight
- Coached by: Dandamudi Rajagopal
Medal record
Men's weightlifting
Representing India
Asian Games
Silver medal – second place	1951 New Delhi	90 kg

Kamineni Eswara Rao (26 August 1918 – 7 November 2007) was an Indian weightlifter from Andhra Pradesh. He was one of the early Olympians in the sport for India.

Rao was born to Kamineni Pitchaiah, a farmer, and Seethama in Bhatlapenamarru village in Krishna district, Andhra Pradesh on 26 August 1918. He studied only till Class 5. He had two daughters.

== Career ==
He competed at the 1952 Summer Olympics at Melbourne in the under-90 middle weight category and finished 11th. In the next edition of the 1956 Summer Olympics at Helsinki he took part in the same category.

He won the gold in the 1954 Senior Nationals in Delhi in the 90 kg category, the heaviest class and was declared as Strongman of India. In domestic circuit, he had 25 National records at that time. His first Nationals were in 1949 at the then Calcutta.

In the inaugural Asian Games, he won a silver medal and won the title 'Mr Universe' at London the same year.

== Awards ==
He won the Arjuna Award in 1963.
