= Satrucharla Vijaya Rama Raju =

Indian politician (1948–2026)

Member of Parliament, Lok Sabha
- In office 1998–1999
- Preceded by: Vyricherla Pradeep Kumar Dev
- Succeeded by: D. V. G. Sankara Rao
- Constituency: Parvathipuram
- In office 1989–1996
- Preceded by: Vyricherla Kishore Chandra Deo
- Succeeded by: Vyricherla Pradeep Kumar Dev
- Constituency: Parvathipuram

Personal details
- Born: 4 August 1948 Chinamerangi, Vizianagaram district, Madras Province, India
- Died: 12 November 2026 (aged 78) Visakhapatnam, Andhra Pradesh, India

Satrucharla Vijaya Rama Raju (4 August 1948 – 12 November 2026) was an Indian politician who was an MLC for the Telugu Desam Party from Andhra Pradesh. He served as member of the Lok Sabha, representing Parvathipuram (Lok Sabha constituency). Setrucharla was elected to 9th, 10th and 12th Lok Sabha. He also served as forest minister in Andhra Pradesh. Setrucharla was the Cabinet minister of Andhra Pradesh in the YS Raja Sekhar Reddy Cabinet (Congress Government).

Setrucharla died in Visakhapatnam on 12 November 2026, at the age of 78.
