= Bhadrachalam Lok Sabha constituency =

Defunct Lok Sabha constituency in Telangana, India

Coordinates: 17.7°N 80.9°E

Bhadrachalam
- Former Lok Sabha constituency

Constituency details
- Country: India
- Region: South India
- State: Andhra Pradesh
- Assembly constituencies: Paderu; Chintapalli; Yellavaram; Gopalapuram; Polavaram; Bhadrachalam; Burgampahad
- Established: 1967
- Abolished: 2008
- Reservation: ST

Bhadrachalam was a Lok Sabha constituency in the state of Andhra Pradesh in India till 2008.

== Members of Parliament ==
Year	Winner	Party
1967	B. Radhabai Ananda Rao	Indian National Congress
1971	B. Radhabai Ananda Rao	Indian National Congress
1977	B. Radhabai Ananda Rao	Indian National Congress
1980	B. Radhabai Ananda Rao	Indian National Congress
1984	Sode Ramaiah	Communist Party of India
1989	Kamala Kumari Karredula	Indian National Congress
1991	Kamala Kumari Karredula	Indian National Congress
1996	Sode Ramaiah	Communist Party of India
1998	Sode Ramaiah	Communist Party of India
1999	Dumpa Mary Vijayakumari	Telugu Desam Party
2004	Babu Rao Mediyam	Communist Party of India
Constituency made defunct in 2008 after Delimitation Commission of India Report.

== Election results ==
=== 2004 ===
2004 Indian general elections: Bhadrachalam
Party	Candidate	Votes	%	±%
CPI(M)	Babu Rao Mediyam	373,148	45.32	+45.32
TDP	K. P. R. K Phaneeswaramma	319,342	38.78	−1.52
BSP	Janni Appa Rao	71,978	8.74	
Independent	Ranga Reddi Ketchela	38,219	4.64	
MCPI(S)	Bheema Raju Madakam	20,728	2.52	
Majority		53,806	6.54	+45.32
Turnout		823,415	69.01	−0.99
CPI(M) gain from TDP		Swing		

=== General Election, 1999 ===
General Election, 1999: Bhadrachalam
Party	Candidate	Votes	%	±%
TDP	Dumpa Mary Vijayakumari	293,593	40.30	
INC	T. Ratna Bai	256,490	35.21	
CPI	Sode Ramaiah	122,496	16.81	
NTRTDP(LP)	Pangi Satyanarayana	24,425	3.35	
Independent	K. Ranga Reddy	16,893	2.32	
Independent	Kurasam Subba Rao	14,659	2.01	
Majority		37,103		
Turnout		759,883	70.00	
TDP gain from CPI		Swing		

=== General Election, 1998 ===
General Election, 1998: Bhadrachalam
Party	Candidate	Votes	%	±%
CPI	Sode Ramaiah	263,141	39.10	
INC	Kamala Kumari Karredula	203,701	30.27	
NTRTDP(LP)	Setti Lakshmanudu	121,615	18.07	
Independent	Kurasam Subba Rao	50,314	7.48	
Independent	Kechela Ranga Reddi	25,185	3.74	
Independent	Murla Yerrayya Reddy	5,252	0.78	
Independent	Gorle Vinod Chand	3,735	0.56	
Majority		59,440		
Turnout		692,097	63.31	
CPI hold		Swing		

=== General Election, 1996 ===
General Election, 1996: Bhadrachalam
Party	Candidate	Votes	%	±%
CPI	Sode Ramaiah	245,214	37.69	
INC	Kamala Kumari Karredula	217,806	33.48	
NTRTDP(LP)	Setty Laxmanudu	106,946	16.44	
BJP	Kurusa Bojjaiah	26,367	4.05	
Independent	Kechala Ranga Reddy	25,347	3.90	
Independent	Tolem Narasayya	12,485	1.92	
Independent	Bheera Laxmi	8,345	1.28	
AIIC(T)	B. A. Tilak	5,370	0.83	
Independent	Vaggela Srinivasa Rao	2,760	0.42	
Majority		27,408		
Turnout		676,585	61.39	
CPI gain from INC		Swing		

=== General Election, 1991 ===
General Election, 1991: Bhadrachalam
Party	Candidate	Votes	%	±%
INC	Kamala Kumari Karredula	238,956	48.23	
CPI	Sode Ramaiah	194,785	39.31	
BJP	Gorle Dhanunjaya Raju	19,428	3.92	
Independent	Bonku Prabhakara Rao	16,847	3.40	
Independent	Kursam Achaiah	9,122	1.84	
BSP	Bapanna Dora	6,731	1.36	
Independent	Bakuru Kondababu	3,812	0.77	
Independent	Janshi	3,185	0.64	
JP	P. Vani Ramana Rao	2,604	0.53	
Majority		44,171		
Turnout		519,063	54.87	
INC hold		Swing		

=== General Election, 1989 ===
General Election, 1989: Bhadrachalam
Party	Candidate	Votes	%	±%
INC	Kamala Kumari Karredula	270,648	48.58	
CPI	Sode Ramaiah	246,662	44.28	
Independent	K. P. Santi Raju	26,670	4.79	
Independent	Badavath Nehru Bapuji	13,133	2.36	
Majority		23,986		
Turnout		595,519	63.27	
INC gain from CPI		Swing		

=== General Election, 1984 ===
General Election, 1984: Bhadrachalam
Party	Candidate	Votes	%	±%
CPI	Sode Ramaiah	195,618	50.30	
INC	B. Radhabai Ananda Rao	170,978	43.97	
Independent	Bapanna Dora Karam	18,267	4.70	
Independent	Alam Lakshmayya	4,010	1.03	
Majority		24,640		
Turnout		402,058	54.63	
CPI gain from INC		Swing		

=== General Election, 1980 ===
General Election, 1980: Bhadrachalam
Party	Candidate	Votes	%	±%
INC	B. Radhabai Ananda Rao	147,534	53.35	
CPI	Karam Chandraiah	79,208	28.64	
JP	Ratnabai Tadapatla	26,760	9.68	
Independent	Karam Bappanna Dora	10,090	3.65	
Independent	K. P. Shanti Raju	7,212	2.61	
Independent	Alam Lakshmaiah	5,732	2.07	
Majority		68,326		
Turnout		286,010	42.73	
INC hold		Swing		

=== General Election, 1977 ===
General Election, 1977: Bhadrachalam
Party	Candidate	Votes	%	±%
INC(R)	B. Radhabai Ananda Rao	155,198	59.91	
BLD	P. Vani Ramanarao	59,230	22.86	
CPI	Sode Ramaiah	27,966	10.80	
Independent	Suraboina Suvarna Kumar	10,528	4.06	
Independent	Karam Baapanna Dora	3,999	1.54	
Independent	Tellam Sundara Rao	2,139	0.83	
Majority		95,968		
Turnout		270,495	45.16	
INC(R) hold		Swing		

=== General Election, 1971 ===
General Election, 1971: Bhadrachalam
Party	Candidate	Votes	%	±%
INC(R)	B. Radhabai Ananda Rao	115,367	58.54	
CPI	Nupa Bojji	47,319	24.01	
Independent	Pujari Balaraju	9,450	4.80	N/A
Independent	Mirtiwada Pedabbai	9,297	4.72	N/A
INC(O)	P. Vani Ramana Rao	8,544	4.34	New entry
Independent	Karam Bapanna Dora	7,089	3.60	N/A
Majority		68,048		
Turnout		205,533	40.95	
INC(R) hold		Swing		

=== General Election, 1967 ===
General Election, 1967: Bhadrachalam
Party	Candidate	Votes	%	±%
INC	B. Radhabai Ananda Rao	121,630	51.96	New entry
CPI(M)	K. P. Santharaju	54,395	23.24	New entry
CPI	C. Tammaih	32,424	13.85	New entry
Independent	S. S. Kumar	19,244	8.22	N/A
Independent	T. G. S. S. Rao	6,405	2.74	N/A
Majority		67,235	28.72	New entry
Turnout		246,715	53.04	New entry
INC win (new seat)				

== See also ==
- Bhadrachalam
- List of constituencies of the Lok Sabha
