= T. Kalpana Devi =

Indian politician and doctor

Member of the 8th Lok Sabha for Warangal
- In office 1984–1989
- Preceded by: Kamaluddin Ahmed
- Succeeded by: Surendra Reddy
- Majority: 8,456

Personal details
- Born: 13 July 1941; Bhatlapenumarru, Andhra Pradesh, India
- Died: 29 May 2016 (aged 74); Hyderabad, Andhra Pradesh, India
- Political party: Telugu Desam Party

T. Kalpana Devi (1941–2016) was a doctor and politician from Andhra Pradesh. She was a member of the 8th Lok Sabha.

== Early life ==
Kalpana Devi was born on 13 July 1941 at Bhatlapenumarru village of Krishna district to Chalasani Veera Raghavaiah. She did her MBBS from Kakatiya Medical College in Warangal.

== Career ==
Kalpana Devi was a medical practitioner at the private nursing home in Hanamkonda before joining the Telugu Desam Party (TDP). During the 1984 Indian general election for the 8th Lok Sabha, she contested from Warangal and defeated her nearest rival Kamaluddin Ahmed of the Indian National Congress by a margin of 8,456 votes. In the next general election however, she lost to INC's Rama Sahayam Surender Reddy.

Later, Devi left TDP for INC and contested the general elections held successively in 1998 and 1999. She secured 38.25% and 44.74% votes in these elections and lost to TDP's candidates Azmeera Chandulal and Bodakunti Venkateshwarlu respectively.

== Personal life ==
Devi married Dr. T. Narasimha Reddy on 10 July 1961. She had two sons from him. She died on 29 May 2016, at a hospital in Hyderabad. Her funeral rites were performed in Warangal.
