= Pingali Venkayya =

Indian freedom fighter (1876 - 1963)

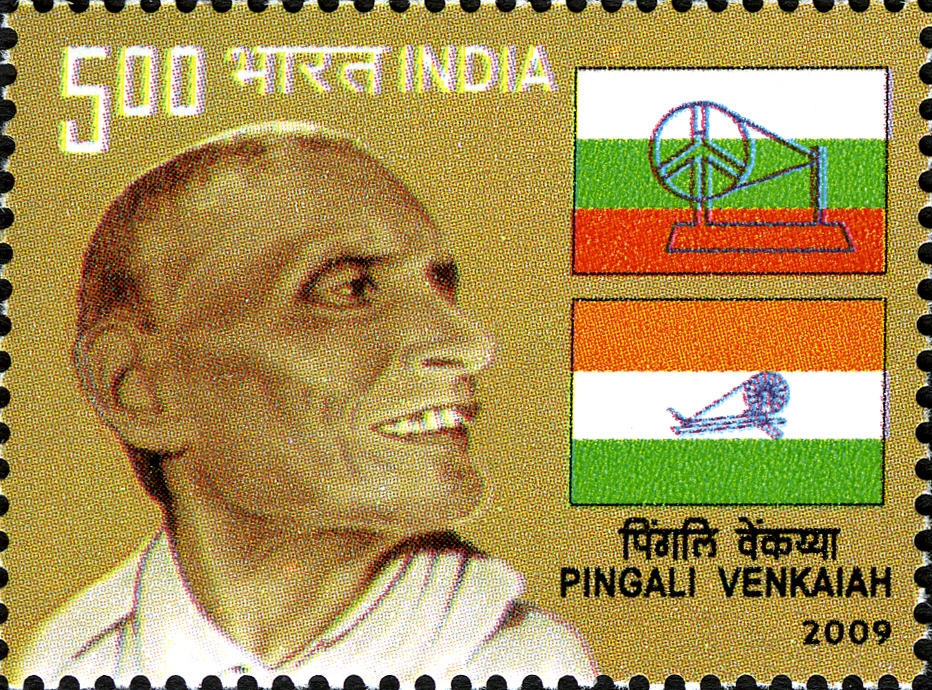
- Venkayya on a 2009 stamp of India
- Born: 2 August 1876/8; Bhatlapenumarru, Madras Presidency, British India (now in Andhra Pradesh, India)
- Died: 4 July 1963 (aged 84 or 86); India
- Other names: Diamond Venkayya; Patti Venkayya
- Known for: Design of Indian National Flag
- Spouse: Rukminamma

Pingali Venkayya (2 August 1876/8 – 4 July 1963) was an Indian freedom fighter, known for designing the initial version of the Indian National Flag. Apart from his role in the independence movement, Venkayya was a lecturer, author, geologist, educationalist, agriculturist, and a polyglot.

Venkayya joined the British Indian Army at age 19 and served in South Africa during the Second Boer War (1899–1902). During his service, he recognized the need for a national flag for India as Indian soldiers were required to salute the Union Jack, the British flag. Inspired by his experience and later by attending the 1906 AICC session in Calcutta, he developed a vision for a flag representing Indians, opposing the practice of hoisting the British flag at Congress meetings.

Venkayya presented his design for an Indian national flag to Mahatma Gandhi in 1921 during Gandhi's visit to Vijayawada. The flag initially consisted of red and green stripes representing Hindus and Muslims, respectively, and, on Gandhi's suggestion, a white stripe was added to represent other communities in India. This flag design was used informally at Congress meetings from 1921 and served as the foundation for the Indian national flag, which was officially adopted in its final form by the Constituent Assembly on 22 July 1947.

He retired from active politics in 1922. He was also an agriculturist, as well as an educationist who set up an educational institution in Machilipatnam. He died in 1963. In 2009, the Indian government issued a postage stamp in his honour, and in 2012, his name was recommended for a posthumous Bharat Ratna though no formal response was received from the central government.

== Early life ==
Pingali Venkayya was born on 2 August 1876 or 1878 at Bhatlapenumarru, near Machilipatnam, in what is now the Indian state of Andhra Pradesh. His parents were Hanumantha Rayudu and Venkata Ratnam. He studied at the Hindu High School in Machilipatnam, but also spent his childhood in various places in the Krishna district like Yarlagadda and Pedakallepalli. He married Rukminamma, the daughter of the Karanam of Pamarru village.

At the age of 19, he enrolled in the British Indian Army and was deployed to South Africa during the Second Boer War (1899–1902), where he met Gandhi for the first time. It was during the war when the soldiers had to salute the Union Jack, the national flag of Britain, that Venkayya realised the need for having a flag for Indians.

== Career ==
Venkayya earned a diploma in Geology from the Madras Presidency College. From 1911–1944, he worked as a lecturer at the Andhra National College in Machilipatnam. From 1924 to 1944, he researched mica in Nellore. He also authored a book titled 'Thalli Raayi' on geology.

Venkayya was also popularly nicknamed 'Diamond Venkayya', as he was an expert in diamond mining. He was also called 'Patti Venkayya' (Cotton Venkayya), because he dedicated most of his time to researching staple varieties of cotton and did a detailed study on a variety called Cambodia Cotton. He was a polyglot who was proficient in many languages including Japanese and Urdu. He delivered a full-length speech in Japanese at a school in Bapatla in 1913. From then, he also came to be referred to as 'Japan Venkayya'.

== Design of National Flag ==
Gandhi's Flag, designed by Venkayya, was introduced at the Congress meeting in 1921

When Venkayya attended the All India Congress Committee (AICC) session in 1906 in Calcutta under the leadership of Dadabhai Naoroji, he was inspired to design a flag for the Indian National Congress as he opposed the idea of hoisting the British flag at Congress meetings. Venkayya worked on potential designs that could be used as flags for the newly coined Swaraj movement to signify independence. There were over 25 drafts of the flags with different significance and relations with Indian culture, heritage and history. In 1916, he published a book titled Bharatha Desaniki Oka Jatiya Patakam (transl. A National Flag for India) with 30 potential designs for a flag. From 1918 to 1921, he proposed various ideas to the Congress leadership while also working at the Andhra National College in Machilipatnam.

In 1921, the AICC held its two-day crucial session in Bezawada (now Vijayawada) on March 31 and April 1. When Gandhi asked Venkayya to submit a design for the flag at the session, he did it within three hours. Venkayya had shown Gandhi a rudimentary design of a flag on a Khadi bunting. This first flag was coloured red and green — the red representing Hindus and the green representing Muslims in the country. On Gandhi's suggestion, Venkayya added a white stripe to represent all the other denominations and religions present in the country. While the flag was not officially adopted by the AICC, which reordered the stripes and changed the red to orange in 1931, it came to be used across the country. Since 1921, Venkayya's flag has been used informally at all Congress meetings. The flag was adopted in its present form during a meeting of the Constituent Assembly on 22 July 1947, twenty days before India's Independence.

== Death and legacy ==
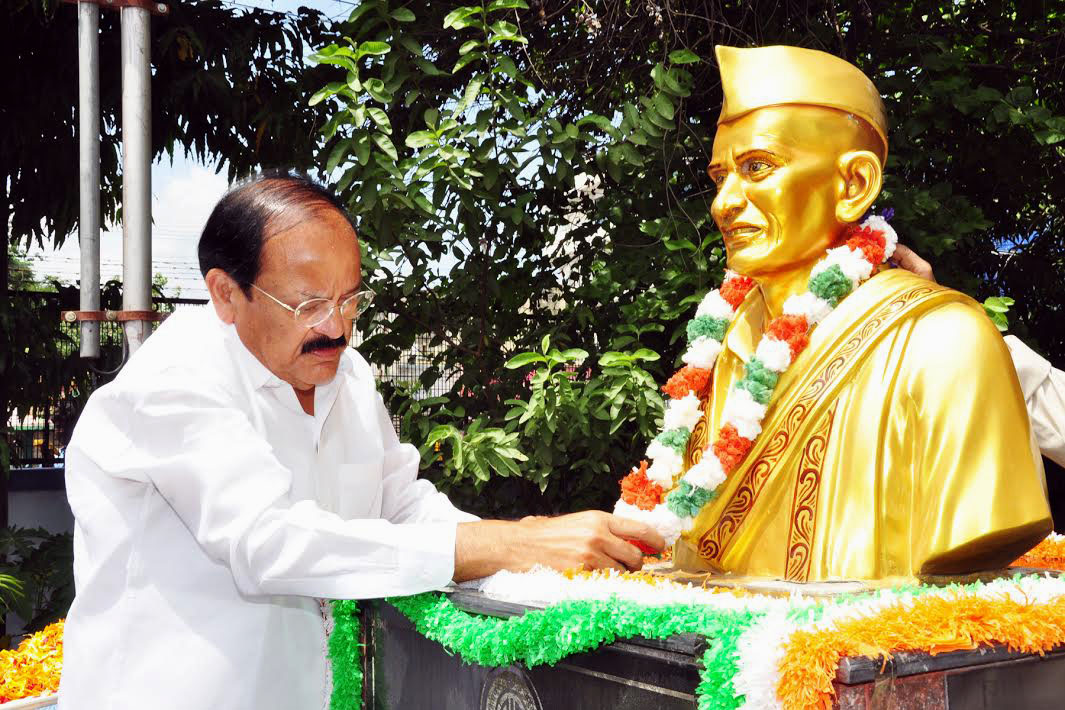
Venkaiah Naidu garlanding the statue of Pingali Venkayya at AIR Station in Vijayawada

Venkayya was honoured by his friends months before his passing. He lived humbly according to Gandhian ideologies and died in 1963. Venkayya's daughter Ghantasala Seetha Mahalakshmi died on 21 July 2022 at the age of 100.

A postage stamp to commemorate Venkayya and the first flag was issued in 2009. The Vijayawada station of All India Radio was named after him in 2014. In 2012, his name was proposed for a posthumous Bharat Ratna though there has been no response from the central government on the proposal.

In 1995, then Chief Minister of Andhra Pradesh N. T. Rama Rao commissioned a statue of Venkayya – one among the 31 state icons – at Tank Bund Road in Hyderabad. In January 2015, a statue of him was unveiled by the then Urban Development Minister Venkaiah Naidu, in the forelawns of the All India Radio building in Vijayawada. Several statues of Venkayya have been built all over Andhra Pradesh.

== Sources ==
- Roy, Srirupa (August 2006). "A Symbol of Freedom: The Indian Flag and the Transformations of Nationalism, 1906–". Journal of Asian Studies. 65 (3). ISSN 0021-9118. OCLC 37893507.
