= Kamala Kumari Karredula =

Indian politician

Kamala Kumari Kareddula

[Union Minister of India for Women, Child development, Social & Tribal welfare, Member of Parliament]]
- In office 1989–1996
- Preceded by: Sode Ramaiah
- Succeeded by: Sode Ramaiah
- Constituency: Bhadrachalam

Union Minister for Welfare, Govt of India
- In office 1991
- In office 2010–2014

Personal details
- Born: 8 August 1946 (age 80) Lakkavaram, Andhra Pradesh, India
- Died: July 17, 2014 (aged 67) Jangareddygudem, Andhra, India
- Party: Indian National Congress
- Spouse: Raja Rao
- Children: 2 sons, 3 daughtersAnil, Rajini, Kiran, Hema & Kalpana

Kamala Kumari Kareddula was an Indian politician. She was elected to the Lok Sabha, the lower house of the Parliament of India from the Bhadrachalam in Andhra Pradesh as a member of the Indian National Congress party. She was first elected to the 9th Lok Sabha as a Member of Parliament (MP) in 1989. She was selected by late Shree Rajeev Gandhi for the Parliamentary elections and initially elected to the 9th Lok Sabha as a Member of Parliament (MP) in 1989 from Bhadrachalam Lok Sabha constituency that consisted of Seven Legislative Assembly segments & Fifty three Mandals thus recognized as the seconds largest Parliamentary constituency in India. She was re-elected the second time to the 10th Lok Sabha as a Member of Parliament (MP) in 1991 and was then appointed as a Union Minister for Social Welfare, Tribal Welfare, Women & Child development Welfare, Govt of India in 1991 under the Prime Minister, P.V. Narasimha Rao. She was a Member of various Parliamentary Committees and had visited several countries like China, USA etc. as a Member of these Parliamentary Committees. She was a Member of All India Congress Committee as well as a senior Member of PCC Selection Committee that select MPs and MLAs. She was appointed as a Member, National Commission for Scheduled Tribes, Government of India, a Statutory Body with Civil Judiciary powers under the President of India in 2010. Her candidature was strongly proposed to the Prime Minister's Office by the Chief Minister, Late Shri Y.S Rajasekhar Reddy. She was re-appointed again for a three-year term in the same National Commission in 2013 and served the Indian Government till her last breath in 2014. She is survived by her two sons and three daughters who continue to serve the Community through Social Service.

She provided yeoman support for the Underprivileged and Tribal upliftment by donating her personal properties to build churches, schools, hostels, and by promoting simple inter-caste marriages. She always believed in Mrs Indira Gandhi's philosophy of working hard as there is always less competition Vs Taking Credit as there is immense competition. She also meticulously followed the adage, "Simple in Living and Saintly in Thinking". She proved to be a role model to the modern Society by demonstrating impeccable values like Loyalty and Integrity in her Thirty years of Political Career. She sacrificed attending her first Daughter's wedding based on her mentor- Shri Y.S Rajasekhar Reddy's advice and instead stood by the Congress party by voting at the No-Confidence motion for the Prime Minister in New Delhi. She depicted these values by being Corrupt-Free, Loyal to the party and leading a humble life.

She was member of Indian Nursing Councilsince 28 March 1990.
