= Amar Mitra Peddireddy =

- Born: Amar Mitra Peddireddy; 20 September 1986 (age 39); Rampachodavaram, India
- Website: Official website

Amar Mitra Peddireddy, is an activist, visual effects artist and cinematographer who came into light with his montage of visuals was used extensively during newsreels to cover the Bangalore Habba 2011.

He is the son of T Ratna Bai, a prominent politician from Indian National Congress party and Hon Member of the Parliament of India representing Andhra Pradesh in the Rajya Sabha, the Council of States, the upper house of the Indian Parliament. He holds a degree in Multimedia from Jawaharlal Nehru Technological University, Hyderabad. He belongs to Rampachodavaram, Andhra Pradesh, India

His work consisting of a montage of visuals from the Bangalore Queer Pride parade, November 2011, brought him to light on various blogs as the video went Viral on YouTube. Other notable work includes coverage an animated short film on the evolution of communication that was screened at the Hyderabad Short Film Festival, 2010. and coverage of the 17th International Children's Film Festival Hyderabad.

He currently lives in Chicago, where he pursues Digital cinema and extends voluntary support to various NGO's in India that work for Human Rights empowerment. He is known to have made various representations to the Parliament in the area of science and technology, tribal welfare., education and human rights with the help of his mother T Ratna Bai.
