= Cheriyal Assembly constituency =

Constituency of the Andhra Pradesh Legislative Assembly

Coordinates: 17.55°N 78.13°E

Cheriyal
- Former constituency for the State Legislative Assembly

Constituency details
- Country: India
- State: Andhra Pradesh
- District: Warangal
- Lok Sabha constituency: Hanamkonda
- Established: 1961
- Abolished: 2008

Cheriyal Assembly constituency (also spelled as Cherial Assembly constituency) was one of the constituencies of the Andhra Pradesh Legislative Assembly. It existed from 1961 to 2008.

== History ==
It was part of Warangal Lok Sabha constituency. The constituency number was 271. It consisted of Cherial and Raiparthi circles and Nirmitta circle (excluding Khileshapur, Yerrahgollapahad, Adivkeshapur, Inkrial, Hanumantapur, Malakpet villages), in Jangaon taluk according to Delimitation of Parliamentary and Assembly Constituencies Order, 1961.

It was part of Siddipet Lok Sabha constituency. The constituency number was 256, and reserved for SC. It consisted of Cheriyal and Reberthi circles and Narmetta circle (excluding Machupahad, Myakala Gutta, Adavikeshavapur, Venkriyal, Erragolla Pahad, Khileshapuram villages) in Jangaon taluk according to Delimitation of 1967.

It was part of Hanamkonda Lok Sabha constituency. The constituency number was 261. And consisted of Cheriyal, Rebarthi and Narmetta circles in Jangaon taluk according to Delimitation of Parliamentary and Assembly Constituencies Order, 1976.

== Members of the Legislative Assembly ==
Election	Member	Party
1962	Mohamed Kamaluddin Ahmed	Indian National Congress
1967	B. Abraham	Communist Party of India
1972	Pambala Katam Lingaiah	Indian National Congress
1978	G. Siddaiah	Indian National Congress
1983	Nimma Raja Reddy	Telugu Desam Party
1985	Nimma Raja Reddy	Telugu Desam Party
1989	Nimma Raja Reddy	Telugu Desam Party
1994	Nimma Raja Reddy	Telugu Desam Party
1999	Rajalingam Nagapuri	Indian National Congress
2004	Pratap Reddy Kommuri	Bharat Rashtra Samithi
2008 By-election	Pratap Reddy Kommuri	Bharat Rashtra Samithi

== Election results ==
=== Assembly By-election 2008 ===
2008 Andhra Pradesh Legislative Assembly by-election : Cheriyal
Party	Candidate	Votes	%	±%
BRS	Pratap Reddy Kommuri	45,288	47.11%	▼12.88
INC	Vaishali Ponnala	30,824	32.06%	New
CPI(M)	Amudala Malla Reddy	13,225	13.76%	New
Independent	Mustyala Manohar	3,859	4.01%	New
Independent	Maheshwar Pitla	1,751	1.82%	New
Independent	Md. Musheeruddin	1,186	1.23%	New
Margin of victory		14,464	15.05%	▼10.07
Turnout		96,173	64.33%	▼6.22
Total valid votes		96,133		
Registered electors		149,495		▲4.91
BRS hold		Swing	▼12.88	

=== Assembly Election 2004 ===
2004 Andhra Pradesh Legislative Assembly election : Cheriyal
Party	Candidate	Votes	%	±%
BRS	Pratap Reddy Kommuri	60,305	59.99%	New
TDP	Mandala Sriramlu	35,055	34.87%	▼12.00
Independent	Pakala Jacob	3,341	3.32%	New
JP	Nandi Nirmala	1,969	1.96%	New
Margin of victory		25,250	25.12%	▲23.29
Turnout		100,536	70.55%	▲2.64
Total valid votes		100,533		
Rejected ballots		3	0.00%	▼3.42
Registered electors		142,505		▲3.19
BRS gain from INC		Swing	▲11.29	

=== Assembly Election 1999 ===
1999 Andhra Pradesh Legislative Assembly election : Cheriyal
Party	Candidate	Votes	%	±%
INC	Rajalingam Nagapuri	44,107	48.70%	▲40.81
TDP	Mandala Sree Ramulu	42,447	46.87%	▼3.76
CPI	Challa Damodar Reddy	3,290	3.63%	New
Margin of victory		1,660	1.83%	▼12.88
Turnout		93,777	67.91%	▲0.89
Total valid votes		90,570		
Rejected ballots		3,207	3.42%	▲1.09
Registered electors		138,099		▲2.62
INC gain from TDP		Swing	▼1.93	

=== Assembly Election 1994 ===
1994 Andhra Pradesh Legislative Assembly election : Cheriyal
Party	Candidate	Votes	%	±%
TDP	Nimma Raja Reddy	44,606	50.63%	▼0.80
Independent	Rajalingam Nagapuri	31,650	35.93%	New
INC	Siddaiah Gorla	6,950	7.89%	▼38.11
BJP	Ananthula Ravinder	1,515	1.72%	New
BSP	Gandhi Banoth	1,442	1.64%	▲0.95
Independent	Purma Sudhaker Reddy	1,171	1.33%	New
Margin of victory		12,956	14.71%	▲9.28
Turnout		90,196	67.02%	▼0.41
Total valid votes		88,095		
Rejected ballots		2,101	2.33%	▼3.89
Registered electors		134,572		▲7.37
TDP hold		Swing	▼0.80	

=== Assembly Election 1989 ===
1989 Andhra Pradesh Legislative Assembly election : Cheriyal
Party	Candidate	Votes	%	±%
TDP	Nimma Raja Reddy	40,758	51.43%	▼15.82
INC	Rajalingam Nagapuri	36,455	46.00%	▲35.53
Independent	Lingam Vagalaboina	552	0.70%	New
BSP	Ramchandram. M	547	0.69%	New
Independent	Age Reddy Dasari	480	0.61%	New
Margin of victory		4,303	5.43%	▼40.69
Turnout		84,518	67.43%	▲3.05
Total valid votes		79,257		
Rejected ballots		5,261	6.22%	▲4.02
Registered electors		125,334		▲22.92
TDP hold		Swing	▼15.82	

=== Assembly Election 1985 ===
1985 Andhra Pradesh Legislative Assembly election : Cheriyal
Party	Candidate	Votes	%	±%
TDP	Nimma Raja Reddy	43,175	67.25%	New
Independent	N. Rajalingam	13,564	21.13%	New
INC	Venkat Ram Reddy	6,721	10.47%	▼23.41
Independent	Panla Komrelli	740	1.15%	New
Margin of victory		29,611	46.12%	▲32.98
Turnout		65,644	64.38%	▼1.34
Total valid votes		64,200		
Rejected ballots		1,444	2.20%	▼0.48
Registered electors		101,962		▲9.64
TDP gain from Independent		Swing	▲20.22	

=== Assembly Election 1983 ===
1983 Andhra Pradesh Legislative Assembly election : Cheriyal
Party	Candidate	Votes	%	±%
Independent	Nimma Raja Reddy	27,974	47.03%	New
INC	Siddaiah Gorla	20,155	33.88%	New
CPI	Malla Reddy Rondla	9,613	16.16%	▲1.71
Independent	Bikshapathi Pulugam	785	1.32%	New
JP	Jalli Siddaiah	694	1.17%	▼14.06
Margin of victory		7,819	13.14%	▲1.15
Turnout		61,119	65.72%	▼2.72
Total valid votes		59,483		
Rejected ballots		1,636	2.68%	▼0.58
Registered electors		93,000		▲4.66
Independent gain from INC(I)		Swing	▲15.51	

=== Assembly Election 1978 ===
1978 Andhra Pradesh Legislative Assembly election : Cheriyal
Party	Candidate	Votes	%	±%
INC(I)	G. Siddaiah	18,547	31.52%	New
Independent	Nimma Raja Reddy	11,491	19.53%	New
Independent	Age Reddy Dasari	9,475	16.10%	New
JP	Sultanuddin	8,958	15.23%	New
CPI	R. Malla Reddy	8,501	14.45%	▼5.80
Independent	Y. Chandramouli	624	1.06%	New
Independent	B. Chalma Reddy	472	0.80%	New
Independent	R. Uppalaiah	445	0.76%	New
Margin of victory		7,056	11.99%	▼24.73
Turnout		60,817	68.44%	▲13.47
Total valid votes		58,836		
Rejected ballots		1,981	3.26%	▲3.26
Registered electors		88,859		▲24.61
INC(I) gain from INC		Swing	▼25.45	

=== Assembly Election 1972 ===
1972 Andhra Pradesh Legislative Assembly election : Cheriyal
Party	Candidate	Votes	%	±%
INC	Pambala Katam Lingaiah	21,718	56.97%	▲20.77
CPI	Kompelly Venkataiah	7,719	20.25%	▼22.94
CPI(M)	Bantu Bhagawan Das	6,844	17.95%	New
TPS	Karrella Devadanam	1,839	4.82%	New
Margin of victory		13,999	36.72%	▲29.73
Turnout		39,200	54.97%	▼2.13
Total valid votes		38,120		
Registered electors		71,310		▲9.35
INC gain from CPI		Swing	▲13.78	

=== Assembly Election 1967 ===
1967 Andhra Pradesh Legislative Assembly election : Cheriyal
Party	Candidate	Votes	%	±%
CPI	B. Abraham	15,195	43.19%	▲5.33
INC	G. Ramalingam	12,735	36.20%	▼7.53
SWA	K. Devadanam	7,248	20.60%	New
Margin of victory		2,460	6.99%	▲1.12
Turnout		37,240	57.10%	▼4.19
Total valid votes		35,178		
Registered electors		65,215		▲5.97
CPI gain from INC		Swing	▼0.54	

=== Assembly Election 1962 ===
1962 Andhra Pradesh Legislative Assembly election : Cheriyal
Party	Candidate	Votes	%	±%
INC	Mohamed Kamaluddin Ahmed	15,721	43.73%	New
CPI	Gangasani Gopal Reddy	13,610	37.86%	New
Independent	Barre Hanuma Reddy	4,235	11.78%	New
ABJS	Mangu Srihari	2,382	6.63%	New
Margin of victory		2,111	5.87%	
Turnout		37,720	61.29%	
Total valid votes		35,948		
Registered electors		61,543		
INC win (new seat)				

== See also ==
- List of constituencies of the Telangana Legislative Assembly
