= Chada Suresh Reddy =

Indian politician

Member of Parliament, Lok Sabha
- In office 10 March 1998 — 22 May 2004
- Preceded by: Kamaluddin Ahmed
- Succeeded by: B. Vinod Kumar
- Constituency: Hanamkonda

Personal details
- Born: 1 November 1959 (age 66)
- Party: Bharatiya Janata Party
- Other political affiliations: Telugu Desam Party
- Spouse: Shylaja Reddy

Chada Suresh Reddy is an Indian politician. He was elected to the Lok Sabha, the lower house of the Parliament of India from Hanamkonda as a member of the Telugu Desam Party. He joined the Bharatiya Janata Party in 2019.
