= N. Bhaskara Rao =

Indian politician (1935–2026)

Nadendla Bhaskara Rao
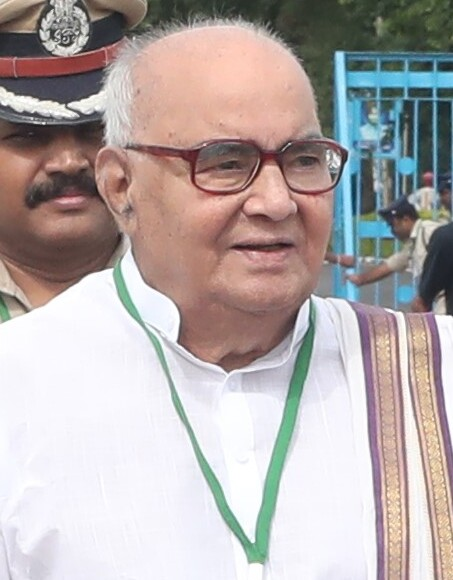
- Rao in 2023

Member of Parliament, Lok Sabha
- In office 10 March 1998 – 26 April 1999
- Preceded by: Tammineni Veerabhadram
- Succeeded by: Renuka Chowdhury
- Constituency: Khammam

11th Chief Minister of Andhra Pradesh
- In office 16 August 1984 – 16 September 1984
- Governor: Thakur Ram Lal; Shankar Dayal Sharma
- Preceded by: N.T. Rama Rao
- Succeeded by: N.T. Rama Rao

Member of Andhra Pradesh Legislative Assembly
- In office 1989–1994
- Preceded by: Annabatguni Sathyanarayana
- Succeeded by: Ravi Ravindranath
- Constituency: Tenali
- In office 1983–1985
- Preceded by: Yadlapati Venkata Rao
- Succeeded by: Veeraiah Kodali
- Constituency: Vemuru
- In office 1978–1983
- Preceded by: Dammalapati Rama Rao
- Succeeded by: Adusumalli Jai Prakasha Rao
- Constituency: Vijayawada East

Personal details
- Born: 23 June 1935 Guntur, Madras Presidency, British India
- Died: 22 April 2026 (aged 90) Hyderabad, Telangana, India
- Party: Bharatiya Janata Party (2019–2026)
- Other political affiliations: Indian National Congress (until 2019)
- Relatives: Nadendla Manohar (son)

Nadendla Bhaskara Rao (23 June 1935 – 22 April 2026) was an Indian politician who served as the 11th Chief minister of Andhra Pradesh for a brief period in 1984. His son Nadendla Manohar is the MLA from Tenali and a current minister in the Chandrababu Naidu ministry, Government of Andhra Pradesh.

== Early life ==
Rao was born on 25 June 1935. A lawyer by profession, he graduated from Osmania University, Hyderabad, he entered the AP state assembly in 1978. He served as a Minister of state in Chenna Reddy's cabinet.

== Career ==
Bhaskar Rao entered the Andhra Pradesh Legislative Assembly in 1978 and became a minister in Chenna Reddy's cabinet. He was one of the senior leaders who played a key role in the formation of Telugu Desam party in 1982. He was considered as co-founder of TDP and as the mentor of NT Rama Rao, who came to power and became the Chief Minister of the United Andhra Pradesh after TDP won assembly elections in 1983. Rao joined NTR cabinet as finance minister.

In August 1984, after one and a half years of the TDP's rule, Rao along with his supporters pulled a coup on the NTR government in August 1984 with the support of Congress (I) and a group within TDP when NTR was away in the US for treatment.

After his return from US, NTR started a nation wide 'save the democracy' protest that was supported by seventeen opposition parties. NTR wore black clothes, launched a statewide yathra, in the name of dharma yuddham. The central government, recalled the governor and reinstalled NTR as CM after Bhaskar Rao resigned. It was only instance in political history of India when a dismissed CM was reinstated. Later, Bhaskar Rao was expelled from TDP. Later, Bhaskara Rao joined Congress (I) along with his close supporter Amukurajah Rao.

=== Election to Lok Sabha ===
Bhaskara Rao was elected to the 12th Lok Sabha in 1998 from Khammam Lok Sabha constituency on Congress (i) ticket. He filed a defamation litigation on N.T.R: Mahanayakudu movie for portraying his character in a negative manner.

On 6 July 2019, after decades of political silence, he joined Bharatiya Janata Party in the presence of Union Home Minister and Bharatiya Janata Party president Amit Shah at a public meeting in Shamshabad, near Hyderabad.

== Electoral history ==
Year	Constituency	Party	Votes	Opponent		Result	Margin
1978	Vijayawada East	INC(I)	35,420	JNP	Adusumilli Aswardhada Narayana	Won	6,520
1983	Vemuru	TDP	38,120	INC	Y. S. R. Prasad	Won	12,450
1985	Vemuru	TDP	34,250	INC	Y. S. R. Prasad	Lost	-4,120
1989	Tenali	INC	57,828	TDP	Annabathuni Satyanarayana	Won	16,983
1994	Tenali	INC	46,230	TDP	Ravi Ravindranath	Lost	-15,480
1998	Khammam	INC	378,410	TDP	Tammineni Veerabhadram	Won	24,150
1999	Secunderabad	INC	409,000	BJP	Bandaru Dattatreya	Lost	-97,626

== Death ==
Bhaskara Rao was undergoing treatment for age-related ailments at Continental Hospitals in Hyderabad and died on 22 April 2026, at the age of 90.

== Autobiography ==
Bhaskar Rao's autobiography, Walking with destiny, was released in May 2012. TDP dismissed the book and alleged that it was a "bundle of lies". In an interview to a TV channel, Bhaskar Rao, criticised the late NT Rama Rao for alleged Mallela Babji and other incidents. He said that he desisted from going public with the facts so as not to hurt the sentiments of NTR fans.
