= Parvathipuram Lok Sabha constituency =

Former constituency of the Indian parliament in Andhra Pradesh

Coordinates: 18.8°N 83.4°E

Parvathipuram
- Former Lok Sabha constituency

Constituency details
- Country: India
- Region: South India
- State: Andhra Pradesh
- Established: 1952
- Abolished: 2008
- Reservation: ST

Parvathipuram was a Lok Sabha constituency in north-eastern Andhra Pradesh till 2008. The seat was reserved for the Scheduled Tribes.

== Members of Parliament ==
Year	Member	Party
1952	N. Ramaseshaiah	Independent
1957	Dippala Suri Dora	Indian National Congress
1962	Biddika Satyanarayana	Indian National Congress
1967	Viswasarai Narasimha Rao Dora	Swatantra Party
1971	Biddika Satyanarayana	Indian National Congress
1977	Kishore Chandra Deo	Indian National Congress
1980	Kishore Chandra Deo	Indian National Congress (U)
1984	Kishore Chandra Deo	Indian Congress (Socialist)
1989	Vijaya Ramaraju Setrucharla	Indian National Congress
1991	Vijaya Ramaraju Setrucharla	Indian National Congress
1996	Pradeep Kumar Dev Vyricherla	Indian National Congress
1998	Vijaya Ramaraju Setrucharla	Telugu Desam Party
1999	D. V. G. Sankara Rao	Telugu Desam Party
2004	Kishore Chandra Deo	Indian National Congress
Constituency Demolished in 2008 after Delimitation Commission of India Report.

== Election results ==
Vote share of Winning candidates
2004	48.69%
1999	49.54%
1998	50.55%
1996	39.95%
1991	53.01%
1989	51.55%
1984	54.49%
1980	49.03%
1977	55.00%
1971	73.82%
1967	56.21%
1962	58.79%
1957 (Seat-1)	25.65%
1957 (Seat-2)	25.20%
1951	33.87%

=== 2004 ===
2004 Andhra Pradesh Legislative Assembly election: Parvathipuram
Party	Candidate	Votes	%	±%
INC	Kishore Chandra Deo	321,788	48.69	▲1.31
TDP	D. V. G. Sankara Rao	3,14,370	47.57	▼1.97
IND	Uooyaka Mutyalu	13,896	2.10	
IND	Arika Gumpaswamy	10,869	1.64	
Majority		7,418	1.12	▼1.04
Turnout		6,60,923	73.74	▲3.86
INC gain from TDP		Swing		

=== 1999 ===
1999 Indian general election: Parvathipuram
Party	Candidate	Votes	%	±%
TDP	D. V. G. Sankara Rao	304,000	49.54	▼1.01
INC	Kishore Chandra Deo	2,90,719	47.38	▲0.75
IND	Arika Gumpa Swamy	9,750	1.59	
IND	Vooyaka Mutyalu	9,172	1.49	
Majority		13,281	2.16	▼1.76
Turnout		6,37,051	69.88	▲3.53
TDP hold		Swing		

=== 1998 ===
1998 Indian general election: Parvathipuram
Party	Candidate	Votes	%	±%
TDP	Vijaya Ramaraju Setrucharla	299,904	50.55	▲12.03
INC	Pradeep Kumar Dev Vyricherla	2,76,627	46.63	▲6.68
IND	Arika Gumpaswamy	8,771	1.48	
IND	Uyika Mutyalu	7,984	1.35	
Majority		23,277	3.92	▲2.49
Turnout		6,04,975	66.35	▲1.43
TDP gain from INC		Swing		

=== 1996 ===
1996 Indian general election: Parvathipuram
Party	Candidate	Votes	%	±%
INC	Pradeep Kumar Dev Vyricherla	231,188	39.95	▼13.06
TDP	Viswasarai Narasimha Rao	2,22,900	38.52	
NTDP	Satrucharla Vijaya Rama Raju	1,00,835	17.42	
BJP	Chukka Mahalaxmi	10,396	1.80	
IND	Vooyaka Mutyalu	7,006	1.21	
IND	Pakki Apparao	3,484	0.60	
IND	Arika Gumpaswamy	2,896	0.50	
Majority		8,288	1.43	▼7.97
Turnout		5,93,995	64.92	▼2.02
INC hold		Swing		

=== 1991 ===
1991 Indian general election: Parvathipuram
Party	Candidate	Votes	%	±%
INC	Satrucharla Vijaya Rama Raju	279,415	53.01	▲1.46
INS(SCS)	Kishore Chandra Deo	2,29,903	43.61	▼0.20
IND	Arika Gumpaswammy	12,702	2.41	
IND	Ayodhya Nimmaka	5,105	0.97	
Majority		49,512	9.40	▲1.66
Turnout		5,42,247	66.94	▼5.90
INC hold		Swing		

=== 1989 ===
1989 Indian general election: Parvathipuram
Party	Candidate	Votes	%	±%
INC	Satrucharla Vijaya Rama Raju	284,228	51.55	▲8.44
INS(SCS)	Kishore Chandra Deo	2,41,587	43.81	
IND	Nimmaka Ayodhya	17,122	3.11	
IND	Arika Gumpaswamy	8,479	1.54	
Majority		42,641	7.74	▼3.64
Turnout		5,89,546	72.84	▲7.20
INC gain from IC(S)		Swing		

=== 1984 ===
1984 Indian general election: Parvathipuram
Party	Candidate	Votes	%	±%
IC(S)	Kishore Chandra Deo	233,175	54.49	
INC	Narasimha Rao Viswasa Rayi	1,84,495	43.11	
IND	Nimmala Krishnamurty	5,474	1.28	
IND	Arika Gumpa Swamy	4,794	1.12	
Majority		48,680	11.38	▲7.19
Turnout		4,39,168	65.64	▲6.96
IC(S) gain from INC(U)		Swing		

=== 1980 ===
1980 Indian general election: Parvathipuram
Party	Candidate	Votes	%	±%
INC(U)	Kishore Chandra Deo	173,179	49.03	
INC(I)	Narsimha Rao Viswasrai	1,58,379	44.84	
IND	Arika Gumpaswamy	21,652	6.13	
Majority		14,800	4.19	▼5.81
Turnout		3,63,668	58.68	▲8.33
INC(U) gain from INC		Swing		

=== 1977 ===
1977 Indian general election: Parvathipuram
Party	Candidate	Votes	%	±%
INC	Kishore Chandra Deo	174,454	55.00	▼18.82
JP	Satya Prasad Thatraj	1,42,710	45.00	
Majority		31,744	10.00	▼48.80
Turnout		3,30,291	50.35	▼1.42
INC hold		Swing		

=== 1971 ===
1971 Indian general election: Parvathipuram
Party	Candidate	Votes	%	±%
INC	Biddika Satyannarayana	190,975	73.82	▲30.03
SWA	Narasimharo Viswasarai	38,847	15.02	▼41.19
CPI	Biddiki Lakshminarayana	28,877	11.16	
Majority		1,52,128	58.80	▲46.38
Turnout		2,67,804	51.77	▼9.77
INC gain from SWA		Swing		

=== 1967 ===
1967 Indian general election: Parvathipuram
Party	Candidate	Votes	%	±%
SWA	Viswasarayai Narsimha Rao	161,009	56.21	▲15.00
INC	Biddika Satyanarayana	1,25,429	43.79	▼15.00
Majority		35,580	12.42	▼5.16
Turnout		3,07,954	61.54	▲5.42
SWA gain from INC		Swing		

=== 1962 ===
1962 Indian general election: Parvathipuram
Party	Candidate	Votes	%	±%
INC	Biddika Satyanarayana	131,625	58.79	
SWA	Viswasarayai Narsimha Rao	92,253	41.21	
Majority		39,372	17.58	
Turnout		2,36,178	56.12	
INC win (new seat)				

=== 1957 ===
1957 Indian general election: Parvathipuram (2 seats)
Party	Candidate	Votes	%	±%
INC	B. Satyanarayana	126,792	25.65	
IND	Dippala Suri Dora	1,24,604	25.20	
INC	V. V. Giri	1,24,039	25.09	
IND	Vasireddy Krishnamurthy Naidu	1,18,968	24.06	
Majority		565	0.11	
Turnout		4,94,403	29.89	

=== 1951 ===
1951–52 Indian general election: Parvathipuram
Party	Candidate	Votes	%	±%
IND	N. Rama Seshiah	67,124	33.87	
IND	Senapathi Sitharama Patrudu	55,279	27.90	
INC	Gona Seetharama Swamy	39,540	19.95	
KMPP	Mallavajjala Venkataramamurthy	36,223	18.28	
Majority		11,845	5.97	
Turnout		1,98,166	53.79	
Independent win (new seat)				

== See also ==
- Parvathipuram, Andhra Pradesh
- List of constituencies of the Lok Sabha
