= Bhatlapenumarru =

- Village
- Interactive map of Bhatlapenumarru
- Location in Andhra Pradesh, India Bhatlapenumarru (India)
- Coordinates: 16.285396°N 80.907471°E
- Country: India
- State: Andhra Pradesh
- District: Krishna

Area
  - Total: 11.66 km^{2} (4.50 sq mi)

Population (2011)
  - Total: 3,016
  - Density: 258.7/km^{2} (669.9/sq mi)

Languages
  - Official: Telugu
- Time zone: UTC+5:30 (IST)
- PIN: 521138
- Nearest city: Vijayawada

Bhatlapenumarru is a village in the Krishna District of the Indian state of Andhra Pradesh. It is located in the Movva mandal of Machilipatnam revenue division.

== People ==
Indian freedom fighter and designer of the Indian National Flag, Pingali Venkayya (August 2, 1878 – July 4, 1963), was born in this village. In honor and remembrance of the man who designed the Indian National Flag, a statue was erected in the center of the village opposite the library.

Arjuna Award winner Kamineni Eswara Rao was also born in this village. He was adjudged "Strongest Man of India" in the 1954 Senior Nationals and was labelled by American coach Bob Hoffman as "Powerhouse". He represented India as weightlifter in 1956 Melbourne Olympics, 1960 Rome Olympics and the first Asian Games(1951). In 2009, a Gymnasium called "Sri Kamineni" was established in honor of Sri Kamineni Eswara Rao at Pedapudi, in the Kuchipudi Center.

== Geography ==
Bhatlapenumarru is located at 16.4500°N 80.7833°E. It is at an altitude of approximately 5m (19feet).
