= Hanamkonda Lok Sabha constituency =

Former constituency of the Indian parliament in Telangana

Coordinates: 18.01°N 79.54°E

Hanamkonda
- Former Lok Sabha constituency

Constituency details
- Country: India
- Region: South India
- State: Andhra Pradesh
- Assembly constituencies: Kamalapur; Cheriyal; Jangaon; Ghanpur Station; Hanamkonda; Shyampet; Parkal
- Established: 1977
- Abolished: 2008
- Reservation: None

Hanamkonda was a Lok Sabha (parliamentary) constituency in Telangana state (then Andhra Pradesh) in southern India until 2008. The former Prime Minister, P V Narasimha Rao, won two elections from here.

== Sasana Sabha segments ==
Hanamkonda Lok Sabha constituency comprised the following Legislative Assembly segments:

Constituency number	Name	Reserved for (SC/ST/None)	District
252	Kamalapur	None	Karimnagar
261	Cheriyal	None	Warangal
262	Jangaon	None	Warangal
268	Ghanpur	SC	Warangal
270	Hanamkonda	None	Warangal
271	Shyampet	None	Warangal
272	Parkal	SC	Warangal

== Members of Lok Sabha ==
Year	Member	Party
1977	P. V. Narasimha Rao	Indian National Congress
1980	P. V. Narasimha Rao	Indian National Congress
1984	Chendupatla Janga Reddy	Bharatiya Janata Party
1989	Kamaluddin Ahmed	Indian National Congress
1991	Kamaluddin Ahmed	Indian National Congress
1996	Kamaluddin Ahmed	Indian National Congress
1998	Chada Suresh Reddy	Telugu Desam Party
1999	Chada Suresh Reddy	Telugu Desam Party
2004	B. Vinod Kumar	Telangana Rashtra Samithi
Constituency Abolished in 2008 after Delimitation Commission of India Report. Most of the area was brought under Warangal Lok Sabha constituency from 2009.

== Election results ==
=== 1980 ===
- P. V. Narsimha Rao (Indira Congress) : 257,961 votes
- Janardhan Reddy (Congress-Urs) : 95,012

=== 1984 ===
General Election, 1984: Hanamkonda
Party	Candidate	Votes	%	±%
BJP	Chendupatla Janga Reddy	263,762	51.0	new
INC	P. V. Narasimha Rao	209,564	40.5	
Independent	Aagaiah Pogula	17,641	3.4	
Independent	Ringili Jayapal Reddy	6,538	1.3	
Independent	Karunakar Boddu	3,972	0.8	
Independent	C.R. Reddy	1,913	0.4	
Majority		54,198	10.5	
Turnout		5,17,559	67.7	
BJP gain from INC		Swing	+51.0	

=== 2004 ===
2004 Indian general elections: Hanamkonda
Party	Candidate	Votes	%	±%
TRS	Boianapalli Vinod Kumar	496,048	59.63	+59.63
TDP	Suresh Chada Reddy	278,981	33.54	−18.02
Independent	Pakala Devadanam	16,587	1.99	+1.67
BSP	Dr Kaitha Venkati	16,094	1.93	
JP	Polepally Narotham Reddy	12,582	1.51	
Independent	Dr Rajaram Sampath Dharampur Yadav	11,634	1.40	+0.87
Majority		217,067	26.09	+77.65
Turnout		831,926	68.92	+1.29
TRS gain from TDP		Swing	+59.63	

== See also ==
- Warangal district
- List of constituencies of the Lok Sabha
