= Baddam Bal Reddy =

Indian politician

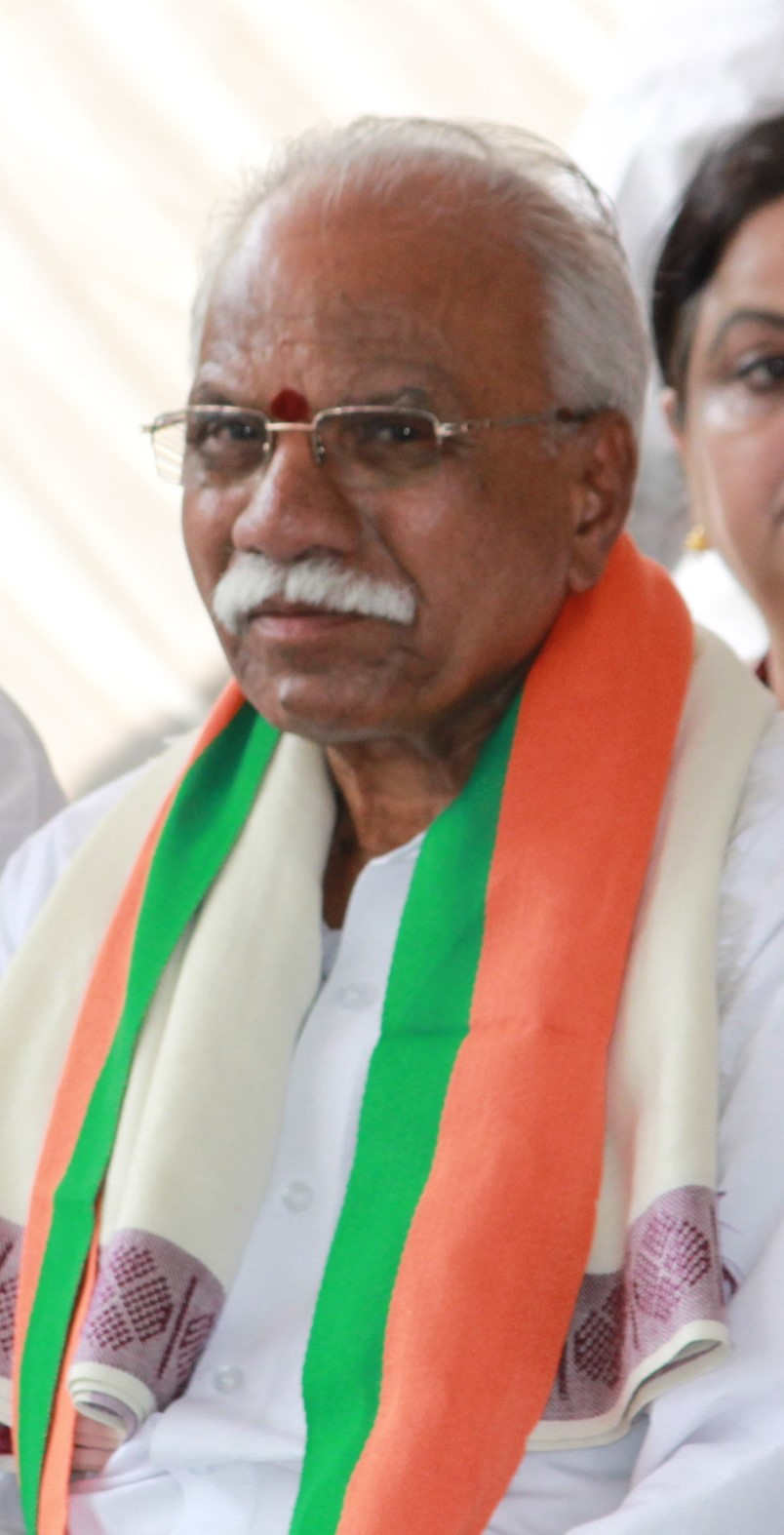

Member of Andhra Pradesh Legislative Assembly
- In office 1985–1999
- Constituency: Karwan

Personal details
- Party: Bharatiya Janata Party

Baddam Bal Reddy was a Bharatiya Janata Party activist from Telangana and three time MLA from Karwan (Assembly constituency) of Telangana Legislative Assembly. He won the seat in 1985, 1989, and 1994 assembly elections. In 2004 he was the target of an assassination attempt by members of a group trained by the ISI. One of the conspirators Syed Zakir Raheem was arrested in 2017 while the main accused, Farhat Ullah Ghori, is a fugitive.

== Electoral History ==
=== Legislative Assembly ===
Year	Constituency	Party	Votes	%	Opponent	Party	Votes	%	Result	Margin	%
1985	Karwan	BJP	46,597	50.79	Virasat Rasool Khan	IND	36,820	40.13	Won	+9,777	+10.66
1989	Karwan	BJP	72,558	45.25	Baqer Aga	AIMIM	69,522	43.36	Won	+3,036	+1.89
1994	Karwan	BJP	60,958	42.14	Syed Sajjad	AIMIM	47,665	32.95	Won	+13,293	+9.19
2004	Karwan	BJP	61,956	36.45	Md. Muqtada Khan	AIMIM	84,191	49.53	Lost	-22,235	-13.08
2014	Karwan	BJP	48,614	30.36	Kausar Moinuddin	AIMIM	86,391	53.95	Lost	-37,777	-23.59

=== Lok Sabha ===
Year	Constituency	Party	Votes	%	Opponent	Party	Votes	%	Result	Margin	%
1991	Hyderabad	BJP	4,15,299	42.17	Sultan Salahuddin Owaisi	AIMIM	4,54,823	46.18	Lost	-39,524	-4.01
1998	Hyderabad	BJP	4,14,173	38.07	Sultan Salahuddin Owaisi	AIMIM	4,85,785	44.65	Lost	-71,612	-6.58
1999	Hyderabad	BJP	3,87,344	35.74	Sultan Salahuddin Owaisi	AIMIM	4,48,165	41.36	Lost	-60,821	-5.62

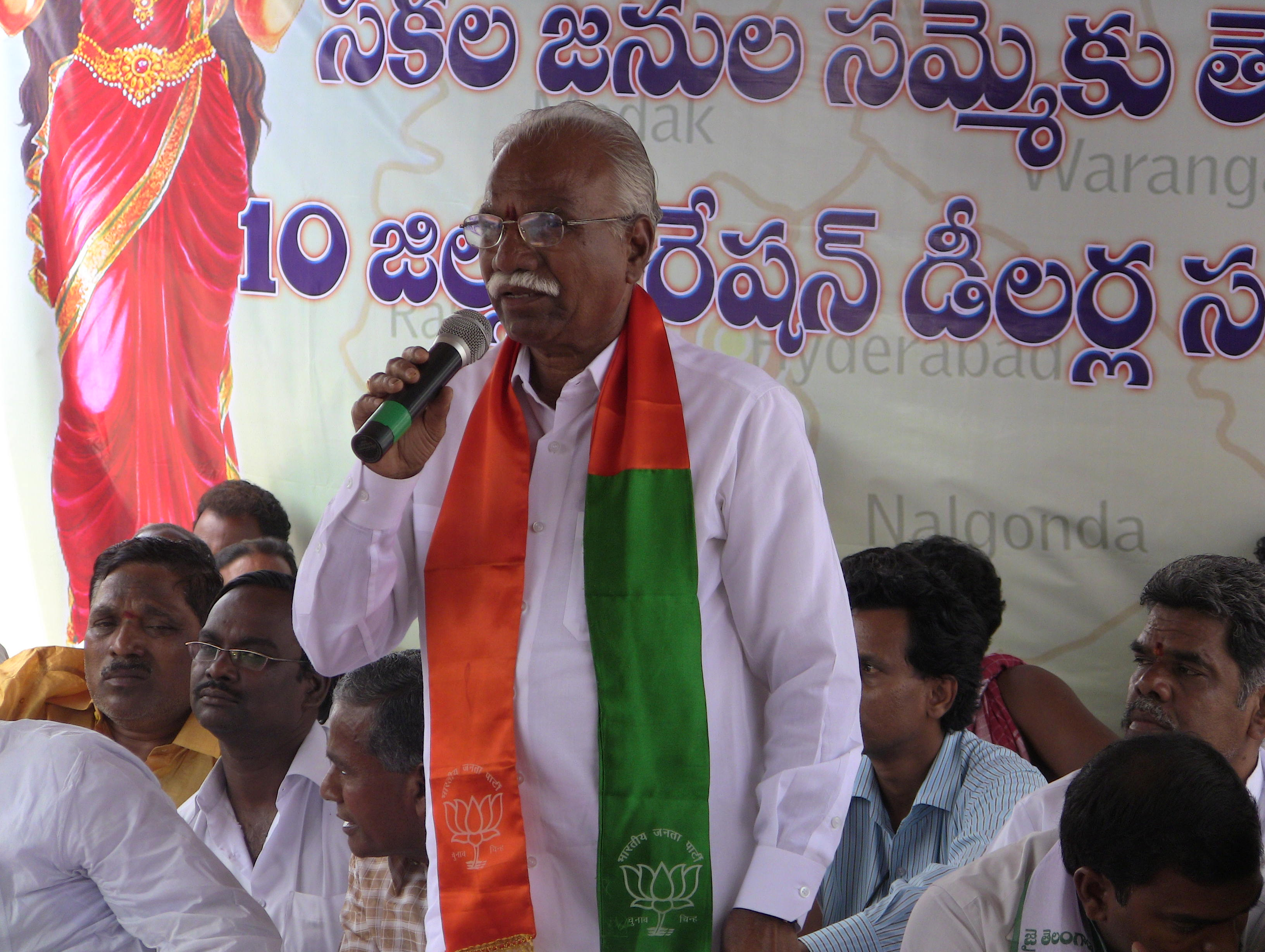
Baddam Bal Reddy addressing a public gathering during Telangana Agitation

== See also ==
- Darsgah-Jihad-O-Shahadat
