= Dumpa Mary Vijayakumari =

Indian politician

Member of parliament, Lok Sabha
- In office 6 October 1999 — 16 May 2004
- Constituency: Bhadrachalam

Personal details
- Born: 9 July 1952
- Party: Telugu Desam Party
- Spouse: Pothala Marideswara Rao
- Education: Andhra University
- Profession: Social worker, Politician

Dumpa Mary Vijayakumari (born 9 July 1952) is an Indian politician and a member of parliament elected from the Bhadrachalam-ST constituency in the Indian state of Andhra Pradesh being a Telugu Desam Party candidate.

== Early life and education ==
Vijayakumari was on born on 9 July 1952 in Sarugudu village in Visakhapatnam district in the Indian state of Andhra Pradesh. She is a graduate of Andhra University, Visakhapatnam in Master of Arts. She married Shri Maridaiah on 3 Jan 1975. She has three sons and one daughter.

== Career ==
In 1999, Vijayakumari was elected a Member of Parliament to 13th Lok Sabha. She served as a member of Committee on Communications from 1999 to 2001, Committee on Empowerment of Women from 2001 to 2002 and 2002–2004, as a member of Consultative Committee, Ministry of Environment and Forests. She has been involved in the upliftment of Scheduled Castes, Scheduled Tribes, Backward Classes, Women, Orphans and aged people.
