= D. V. G. Sankara Rao =

Indian anesthesiologist and politician

Dadichiluka Veera Gouri Sankara Rao

Member of Parliament, Lok Sabha
- In office 6 October 1999 — 16 May 2004
- Preceded by: Vyricherla Kishore Chandra Suryanarayana Deo
- Succeeded by: Vyricherla Kishore Chandra Suryanarayana Deo
- Constituency: Parvathipuram

Personal details
- Born: 30 April 1968 (age 58) Palika valasa, Vizianagaram(Dt.), Andhra Pradesh
- Party: Telugu Desam Party and YSR Congress Party
- Spouse: Swarnalatha
- Children: 2; 1 son and 1 daughter

Dadichiluka Veera Gouri Sankara Rao (born 30 April 1968), sometimes called D. Shankar Rao or D.V.G. Shankar Rao, is an Indian anesthesiologist and politician who served as a Telugu Desam Party member of the Andhra Pradesh Legislative Assembly and of the Lok Sabha.

== Background ==
Shankar Rao is an adivasi, and was born 30 April 1968 in Palika Valasu village. He earned his M.B.B.S and later specialised in anesthesiology both from Andhra Medical College, Visakhapatnam in earning his medical doctorate. He became active in the T.D.P. in his district, and was nominated to and served in the Andhra Pradesh L.A.

== Political life ==
=== Lok Sabha ===
In the 1999 general election Shankar Rao was elected as a member of the Lok Sabha from Parvathipuram constituency, a seat reserved for members of the scheduled tribes. He won with 304,000 votes (49.54%) to 290,719 (47.38%) for his Congress opponent, Vyricherla Kishore Chandra Suryanarayana Deo, and 18,952 for two minor opponents. He was appointed to the Lok Sabha Standing Committee on Labour and Welfare, and served until the 2004 election, when he sought unsuccessfully re-election.

=== State politics ===
He has joined YSR Congress Party in 2021 and held the position of Chairman of the Andhra Pradesh Commission for Scheduled Tribes.

== Personal life ==
He is married to Swarnalata. They have two children, one son and a daughter. He enjoys reading and writing poetry; a collection of his poetry in Telugu, Assa Geevulu, has been published. His Telugu poems are published entitled DVG Kavithalu in 2021.
