= Kishore Chandra Deo =

Indian politician (born 1947)

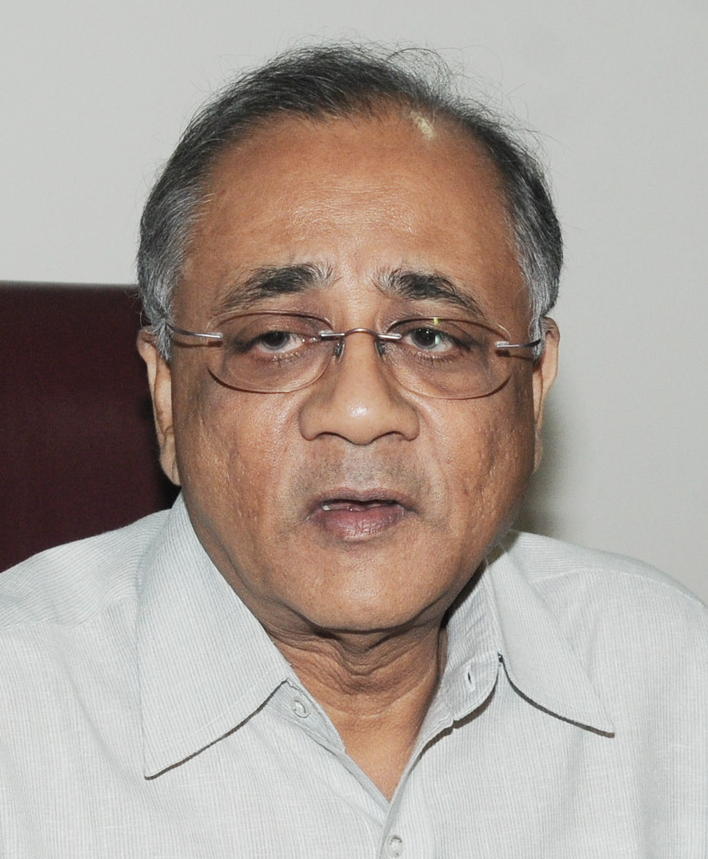
- Deo in 2012

Minister of Tribal Affairs
- In office 12 July 2011 – 26 May 2014
- Prime Minister: Manmohan Singh
- Preceded by: Kantilal Bhuria
- Succeeded by: Jual Oram

Minister of Panchayati Raj
- In office 12 July 2011 – 26 May 2014
- Prime Minister: Manmohan Singh
- Preceded by: Vilasrao Deshmukh
- Succeeded by: Gopinath Munde

Member of Parliament, Lok Sabha
- In office 16 May 2009 – 16 May 2014
- Preceded by: constituency created
- Succeeded by: Kothapalli Geetha
- Constituency: Araku
- In office 16 May 2004 – 16 May 2009
- Preceded by: Dadichiluka Veera Gouri Sankara Rao
- Succeeded by: constituency demolished
- Constituency: Parvathipuram
- In office 1977–1989
- Preceded by: Biddika Satyanarayana
- Succeeded by: Vijaya Ramaraju Setrucharla
- Constituency: Parvathipuram

Personal details
- Born: 15 February 1947 (age 79) Kurupam, Vizianagaram district, Madras Presidency, British India (Now Andhra Pradesh, India)
- Party: Telugu Desam Party (From Feb 2019 Till Feb 2024)
- Other political affiliations: Indian National Congress (Till 2019)
- Spouse: V. Preeti Deo
- Children: 1 son and 1 daughter
- Education: Madras Christian College
- As of 8 April, 2010

Vyricherla Kishore Chandra Suryanarayana Deo (born 15 February 1947) is an Indian politician and a former member of the Telugu Desam Party political party. He has been elected to the Lok Sabha for five times and has also held one term in the Rajya Sabha. From July 2011 to May 2014, he was the Union Cabinet Minister for Tribal Affairs and Panchayati Raj.

== Early life ==
Kishore Chandra Deo was born in Kurupam to Raja V. Durgaprasad Deo of Kurupam and Rani (now, Late Rajmata) Sobhalata Devi. He is the present Zamindar of Kurupam, Vizianagram District, Andhra Pradesh. He belongs to the bogus Konda Dora scheduled tribe community, and is from a family of tribal hill chiefs. He was educated in Madras, he holds an M.A. degree in Political Science and a B.A. degree in Economics from Madras Christian College, Madras (now Chennai).

== Political career ==
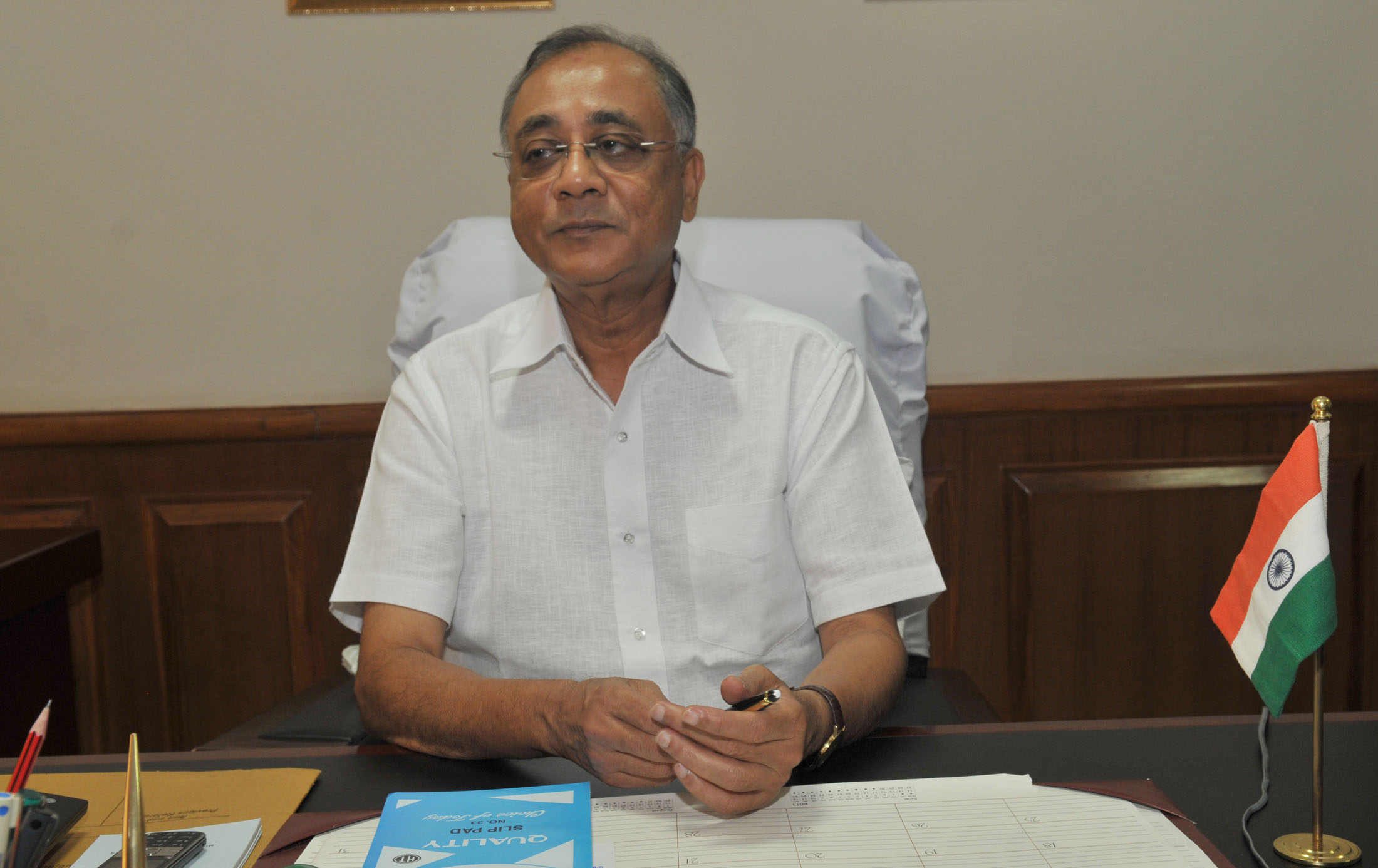
Deo in 2011

Deo was a member of the Lok Sabha representing the Araku (ST) constituency (for 2009-2014) in the southern state of Andhra Pradesh. He has been a member of the Congress Working Committee (CWC) which is the highest decision-making body of the party. He was first elected to parliament in 1977 and has been elected to the Lok Sabha five times, and has also held one term in the Rajya Sabha (upper house of Parliament). On 12 July 2011 he was sworn in as a Cabinet Minister in the Union Cabinet, holding the portfolios of Tribal Affairs and Panchayati Raj.

He was also a Minister of State for Steel, Mines and Coal in the Central Cabinet in 1979-80. He has served on numerous parliamentary committees, and has been the chairperson of several key parliamentary committees, including the Joint Parliamentary Committee on the Scheduled Tribes and Other Traditional Forest Dwellers (Recognition of Forest Rights) Bill that led to the Forest Rights Act. He was also the Chairperson of the Parliamentary Committee on Public Undertakings (CoPU).

He headed the parliamentary investigation into the 2008 cash-for-votes scandal.

Deo is the author of the book Changing India's Political Mould, published in 1993. The book is on electoral and federal reforms in India.

== Positions held ==
- Cabinet Minister - Tribal and Panchayati Raj Affairs - July 2011 – May 2014
- Minister of State for Steel, Mines and Coal in the Central Cabinet - 1979-80

== Electoral History ==
=== Lok Sabha ===
Year	Constituency	Party	Votes	%	Opponent	Party	Votes	%	Result	Margin	%
1977	Parvathipuram	INC	174,454	55.00	S. P. T. Veeravara Thodarmal	BLD	142,710	45.00	Won	+31,744	+10.00
1980	Parvathipuram	INC(U)	173,179	49.03	Narsimha Rao Viswasrai	INC(I)	158,379	44.84	Won	+14,800	+4.19
1984	Parvathipuram	IC(S)	233,175	54.49	Narasimha Rao Viswasa Rayi	INC	184,495	43.11	Won	+48,680	+11.38
1989	Parvathipuram	INS(SCS)	241,587	43.81	Vijayaramaraju Satrucharla	INC	284,228	51.55	Lost	−42,641	−7.74
1991	Parvathipuram	INS(SCS)	229,903	43.61	Vijayaramaraju Satrucharla	INC	279,415	53.01	Lost	−49,512	−9.40
1999	Parvathipuram	INC	290,719	47.38	Dadichiluka Veera Gouri Sankara Rao	TDP	304,000	49.54	Lost	−13,281	−2.16
2004	Parvathipuram	INC	321,788	48.69	Dadichiluka Veera Gouri Sankara Rao	TDP	314,370	47.57	Won	+7,418	+1.12
2009	Aruku	INC	360,458	45.49	Midiyam Babu Rao	CPI(M)	168,014	21.20	Won	+192,444	+24.29
2014	Aruku	INC	52,884	5.79	Kothapalli Geetha	YSRCP	413,191	45.21	Lost	−360,307	−39.42
2019	Aruku	TDP	338,101	31.36	Goddeti. Madhavi	YSRCP	562,190	52.14	Lost	−224,089	−20.78
