= T. Ratna Bai =

Indian politician (born 1946)

Member of the Parliament
- In office 15 April 2008 – 14 April 2014
- Constituency: Andhra Pradesh (Rajya Sabha)

Member of Legislative Assembly
- In office 1972–1978
- Preceded by: Chodi Mallikharjuna
- Succeeded by: Gorla Prakasa Rao
- Constituency: Rampachodavaram, Andhra Pradesh, India

GCC Chairperson
- In office 2005–2007

Personal details
- Born: Ratna Bai Tadapatla; 31 December 1946 (age 79) Rampachodavaram, Andhra Pradesh, India
- Party: Indian National Congress
- Spouse: Satyanarayana Peddireddy
- Children: Amar Mitra; Arun Mitra
- Profession: Politician, Social Service
- Website: Official website

== About ==
Tadapatla Ratna Bai, a politician from Indian National Congress party is a Member of the Parliament of India representing Andhra Pradesh in the Rajya Sabha, the Council of States, the upper house of the Indian Parliament. She has been an active member since her election into the house rising concerns ranging from dowry deaths to Science and Technology.

While she served as the Chairperson of the Girijan Co-Operative Corporation from 2005 to 2007, she was instrumental in reviving the almost obsolete corporation to an operative status. She succeeded in persuading the then Chief Minister of Andhra Pradesh, Dr. Y. S. Rajasekhara Reddy to permit GCC to be exempted from VAT, benefiting 4.5 million Girijan families. She is also Founder President of Rajiv Gandhi Sankshema Sangam, Rampachodavaram, a non-profit organization aimed at tribal welfare.

She served as a Member of the Andhra Pradesh Legislative Assembly from Yellavaram constituency from 1972 to 1978.

== Offices held ==
- April 2008: Nominated to Rajya Sabha
- August 2008 – May 2009: Member, Committee on Rural Development
- August 2008 – May 2009; September 2009 - June 2010: Member, Consultative Committee for the Ministry of Tribal Affairs
- August 2009 onwards: Member, Committee on Food, Consumer Affairs and Public Distribution March
- 2010 onwards: Member, Marine Products Export Development Authority (MPEDA)
- 1972–78: Member, Andhra Pradesh Legislative Assembly
- 2014 - 2020: Member of Legislative Council

== Notes ==
Rajya Sabha
Preceded by -	Member for Andhra Pradesh; 2008 – present	Incumbent
