= Gaddam Ganga Reddy =

Indian politician (1933–2017)

Gaddam Ganga Reddy (12 July 1933 – 2017) was an Indian politician from Telangana. He represented Telugu Desam Party and Indian National Congress from combined Andhra Pradesh in the Lok Sabha for three terms.

Reddy was born on 12 July 1933, in Kesapalli village, Jakranpalli mandal, Nizamabad district. His father Gaddam Raji Reddy was a farmer.

He served as member of the Lok Sabha representing Nizamabad (Lok Sabha constituency). From 1991, he was elected to 10th, 12th and 13th Lok Sabha three times. In 1998 and 2004, he was elected on Indian National Congress ticket.

Reddy died on 21 March 2017 after a brief illness at his residence in Hyderabad, at the age of 84 years old. He is survived by two sons and three daughters.
