= Lakshmi Parvathi =

Indian politician (born 1955)

Member of Andhra Pradesh Legislative Assembly
- In office 10 May 1996 – 6 October 1999
- Preceded by: Kalamata Mohana Rao
- Succeeded by: Kalamata Mohana Rao
- Constituency: Pathapatnam

Personal details
- Born: Lakshmi Parvathi; 14 September 1955 (age 71) Gudivada, Andhra State, India
- Party: Yeduguri Sandinti Rajasekhara Congress Party (2011 - present)
- Other political affiliations: Telugu Desam Party (1982 - 1995); NTR Telugu Desam Party (Lakshmi Parvathi) (1996 - 2010); Indian National Congress (1980 - 1982)
- Spouse(s): Veeragrandham Venkata Subba Rao N. T. Rama Rao (m. 1993; died 1995)
- Occupation: Politician; Writer

Lakshmi Parvathi (born 14 September 1955) is an Indian politician from the state of Andhra Pradesh and widow of N. T. Rama Rao. She was previously married to a harikatha artist Veeragandham Venkata Subba Rao. Later, she separated from him and started living together with Rama Rao who officially married her in 1993.

== Education ==
Lakshmi Parvathi completed her education in Telugu Literature from Telugu University of Telangana in the year 2000.

== Political career ==
Lakshmi Parvathi became active in politics after her marriage to NTR in 1993. Following NTR's death, she established the NTR Telugu Desam Party (Lakshmi Parvathi) (NTRTDP (LP). She successfully contested from the Pathapatnam Assembly constituency as an MLA representing NTRTDP (LP) with the support of the Bharatiya Janata Party. In 1996 Indian general election in Andhra Pradesh, the party fielded candidates in 42 Lok Sabha constituencies from Andhra Pradesh, securing 3,249,267 votes in the elections but failing to win any seats. In the 1999 Andhra Pradesh Legislative Assembly election, Parvathi contested from the Sompeta Assembly constituency and Eluru Assembly constituency. However, she lost in both constituencies, securing only 1,500 votes in Eluru.

Subsequently, Parvathi resigned as the president of NTRTDP (LP) and joined the YSR Congress Party in 2011. She was appointed as Telugu Academy President during YCP regime.

== Later life ==
Parvathi has been the incumbent chair of Telugu and Sanskrit Academy since her appointment on 6 November 2019. She made her acting debut in the 2021 film Radhakrishna, which was about the traditional handicraft of Koyya dolls.
