= Sode Ramaiah =

Indian politician

Member of the Lok Sabha
- In office 1996–1999
- In office 1984–1989
- Constituency: Bhadrachalam

Personal details
- Born: 23 July 1943 (age 83) Kondrajupeta, Khammam district, Andhra Pradesh
- Party: Communist Party of India

Sode Ramaiah (born 23 July 1943) is a leader of the Communist Party of India from Andhra Pradesh. He served as a member of the Lok Sabha representing Bhadrachalam. He was elected to the 8th, 11th, and 12th Lok Sabha.
