= NTR Telugu Desam Party (Lakshmi Parvathi) =

Defunct Indian political party

- Abbreviation: NTRTDP-LP
- President: Lakshmi Parvathi
- Founder: Lakshmi Parvathi
- Founded: 1996 (30 years ago)
- Split from: Telugu Desam Party
- Colours: Turquoise
- ECI status: Delisted
- Alliance: National Democratic Alliance (1998)

Election symbol
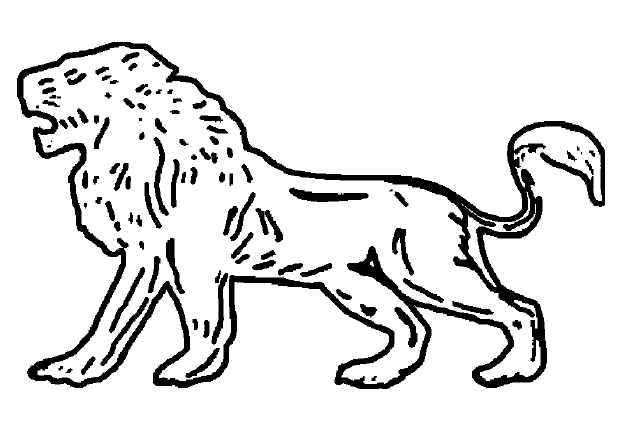
- Lion

The NTR Telugu Desam Party (Lakshmi Parvathi) (abbr. NTRTDP-LP) was a regional political party in the Indian state of Andhra Pradesh. It was founded by Lakshmi Parvathi, the second wife of the film star and Telugu Desam Party (TDP) founder N. T. Rama Rao (NTR) in 1996. The party was formed after NTR's death to counter the TDP but failed to make any significant electoral impact. In 2014, Parvathi joined the YSR Congress Party and NTRTDP-LP was delisted by the Election Commission of India in 2016.

== History ==
The NTR Telugu Desam Party (Lakshmi Parvathi) (NTRTDP-LP) was founded in 1996 by Lakshmi Parvathi, the second wife of NTR, following his death and an internal coup within the TDP in 1995. The coup was triggered by widespread dissatisfaction among party members and legislators over Lakshmi Parvathi's interference in party and state affairs after her marriage to NTR in 1993. With the majority of TDP legislators supporting N. Chandrababu Naidu, this ultimately led to NTR’s removal as the party leader. The NTRTDP-LP was formed as a counter to the TDP under Naidu's leadership.

In the 1996 Indian general election, it contested all 42 constituencies in Andhra Pradesh and polled 10.66% of the vote share in the state, but it failed to win a single seat. In the 1998 Indian general election, the party allied with the Bharatiya Janata Party (BJP), but the alliance did not yield significant results. The party’s candidates collectively secured only 1.2% of the vote share in Andhra Pradesh.

After the 1998 election, the party began to decline as several leaders left, and the BJP allied with Naidu's TDP. In 1999, the party fielded candidates in the 1999 Indian general election and 1999 Andhra Pradesh Legislative Assembly election but performed poorly, with negligible vote share.

By the 2004 Andhra Pradesh Legislative Assembly election, the party’s influence had diminished significantly, fielding only a single Lok Sabha candidate and 18 state assembly candidates, none of whom were successful. Lakshmi Parvathi herself secured only 946 votes in the Atmakur Assembly constituency.

The party failed to recover politically and Lakshmi Parvathi herself joined the YSR Congress Party in 2014. It was delisted by the Election Commission of India in 2016.

== Electoral performance ==
Lok Sabha elections
Year	Lok Sabha	Party leader	Seats contested	Seats won	Change in seats	(%) of votes	Vote swing	Popular vote	Outcome
1996	11th	Lakshmi Parvathi	42	0 / 543	new	0.97	new	3,249,267	Lost
1998	12th	Lakshmi Parvathi	5	0 / 543	Steady	0.10	▼0.87	384,211	Lost
1999	13th	Lakshmi Parvathi	13	0 / 543	Steady	0.18	▲0.08	61,635	Lost
2004	14th	Lakshmi Parvathi	1	0 / 543	Steady	0.00	▼0.18	759	Lost

Andhra Pradesh Legislative Assembly elections
Year	Assembly	Party leader	Seats contested	Seats won	Change in seats	(%) of votes	Vote swing	Popular vote	Outcome
1999	11th	Lakshmi Parvathi	71	0 / 294	new	0.16	new	53,259	Lost
2004	12th	Lakshmi Parvathi	18	0 / 294	Steady	0.02	▼0.14	7,857	Lost

== See also ==
- Politics of India
- Elections in India
- Politics of Andhra Pradesh
- Elections in Andhra Pradesh
- List of political parties in India
