= Kamaluddin Ahmed (politician) =

Indian politician (1930–2018)

- Born: 15 August 1930; Warangal, Hyderabad State, British India
- Died: 1 September 2018 (aged 88); Hyderabad, Telangana, India
- Education: Osmania University

Member of Parliament, Lok Sabha
- In office 1989–1998
- Constituency: Hanamkonda

Ambassador of India to Saudi Arabia
- In office July 2003 – September 2004
- Preceded by: Talmiz Ahmad
- Succeeded by: M. O. H. Farook

Kamaluddin Ahmed (15 August 1930 – 1 September 2018) was an Indian politician. He was a leader of the Indian National Congress political party till 2000, when he left the party and joined the Bharatiya Janata Party. He was the union minister of state, civil supplies and public distribution and Minister of State, Commerce in Government of India from June 1991 to September 1994.

Born in Warangal in 1930, Ahmed studied at Osmania University. He was first elected to Lok Sabha in 1980 from Warangal constituency in Andhra Pradesh state. He was re-elected to the 9th, 10th and 11th Lok Sabha from Hanamkonda in Andhra Pradesh. He died on 1 September 2018 due to natural causes.
