= 2014 Indian general election in Andhra Pradesh =

- 30 April 2014 & 7 May 2014 (phases 7 & 8)

All 25 Andhra Pradesh and 17 Telangana seats in the Lok Sabha
- Turnout: 74.64% (▲1.94%)
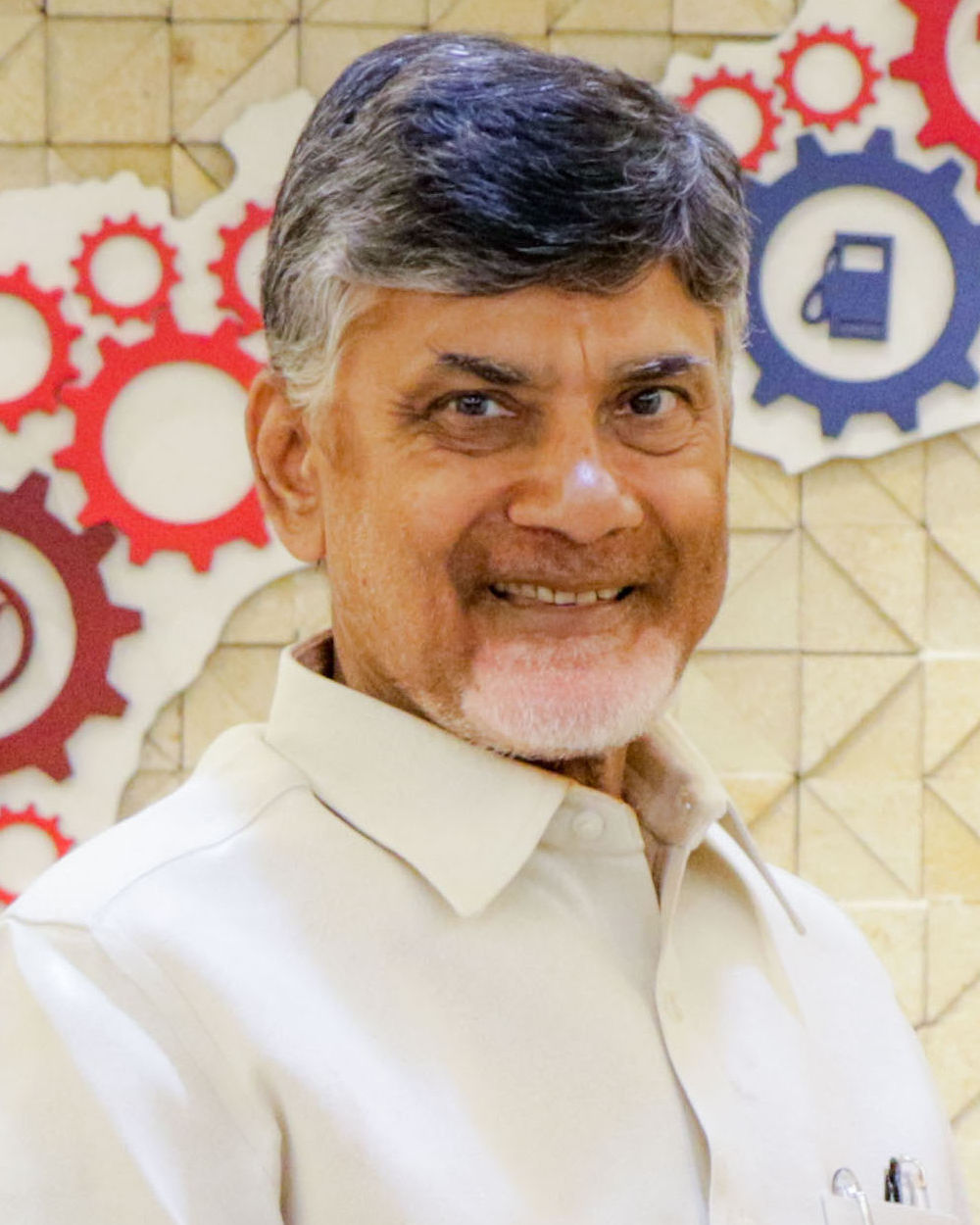

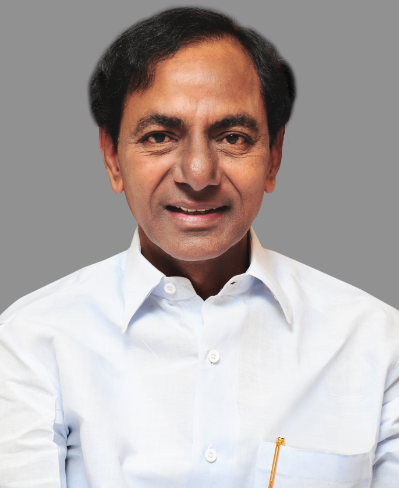

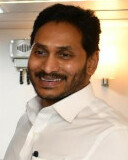

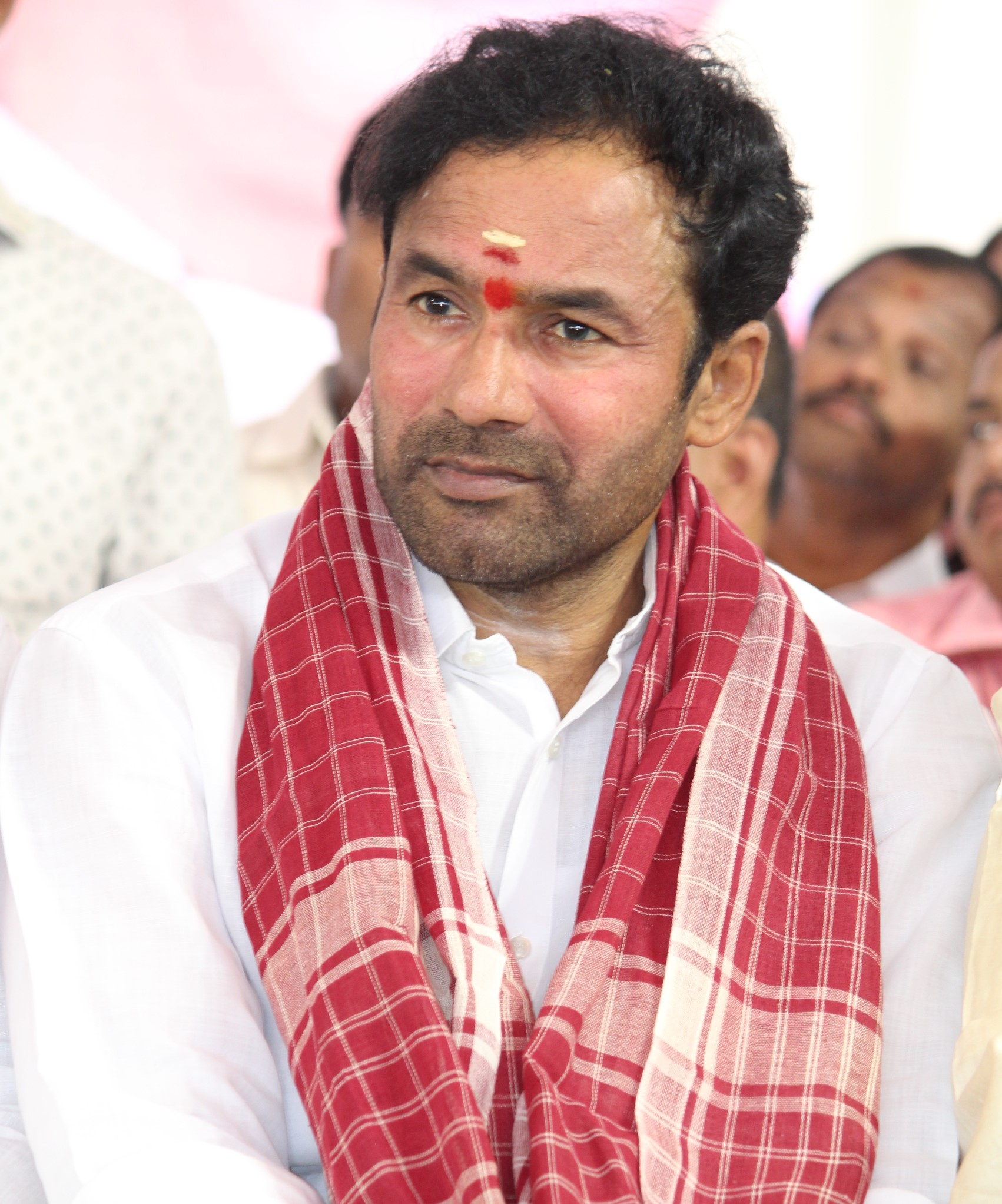

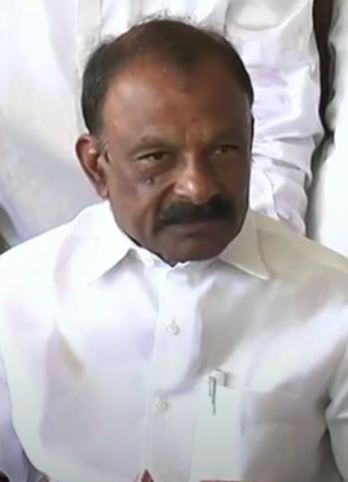

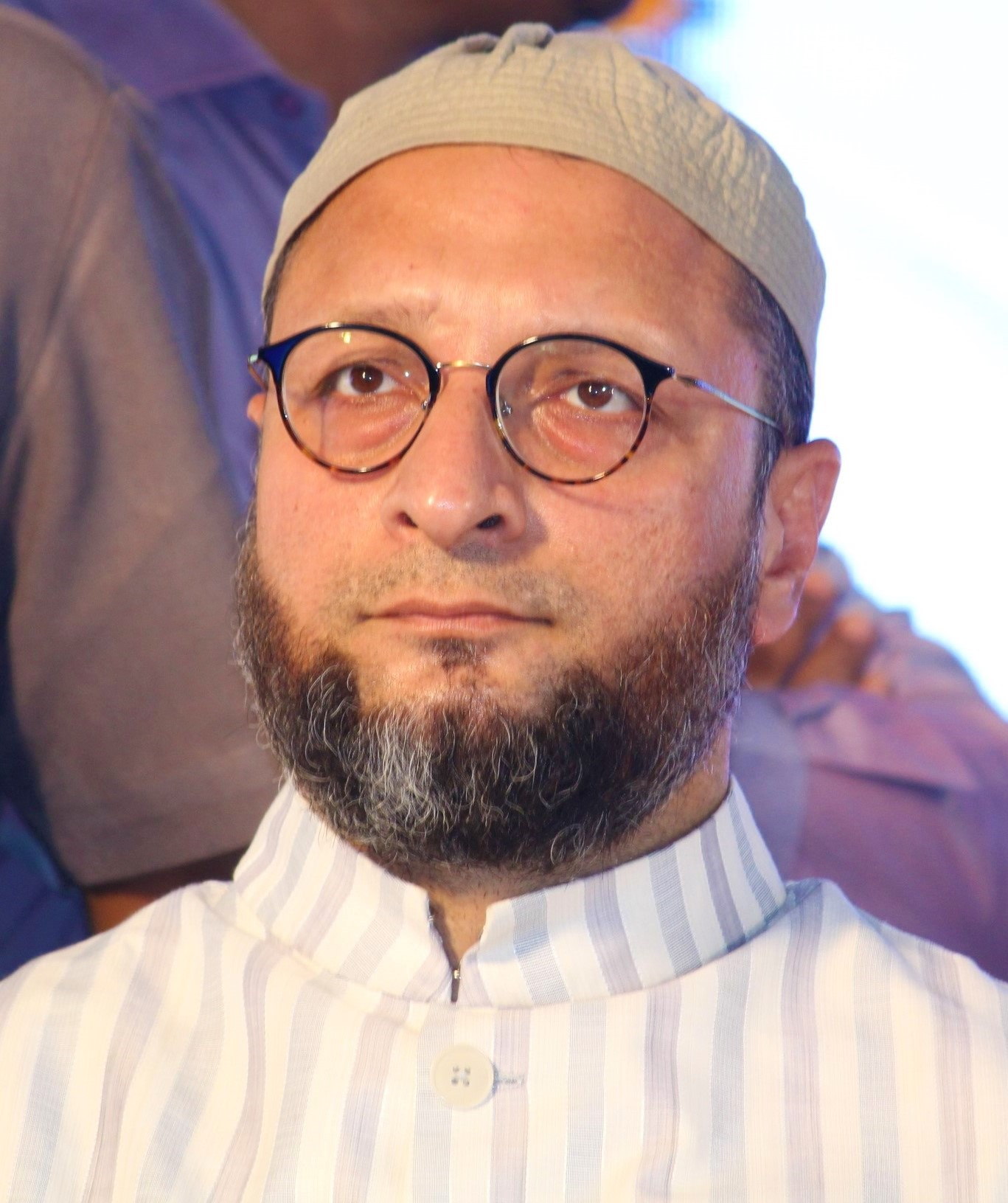
	First party	Second party	Third party
Leader	N. Chandrababu Naidu	K. Chandrashekar Rao	Y. S. Jagan Mohan Reddy
Party	TDP	TRS	YSRCP
Alliance	NDA	-	-
Leader's seat	Did not stand (Note: Member of the Andhra Pradesh Legislative Assembly for Kuppam (re-elected))	Medak	Did not stand (Note: Represents Pulivendla in the Andhra Pradesh Legislative Assembly)
Last election	Party did not contest (Note: Being in INC)	2	Did not exist
Seats won	16	11	9
Seat change	▼10	▲9	▲7
Popular vote	14,099,230	6,736,270	13,995,435
Percentage	29.36%	14.03%	29.14%
Swing			New
	Fourth party	Fifth party	Sixth party
Leader	G. Kishan Reddy	Raghu Veera Reddy	Asaduddin Owaisi
Party	BJP	INC	AIMIM
Alliance	NDA	UPA	-
Leader's seat	Did not stand (Note: Represents Amberpet in the Andhra Pradesh Legislative Assembly)	Did not stand (Note: Represented Kalyandurg in the Andhra Pradesh legislative assembly)	Hyderabad
Last election	0	33	1
Seats won	3	2	1
Seat change	▲3	▼31	Steady
Popular vote	4,091,908	5,578,329	685,730
Percentage	8.52%	11.62%	1.43%
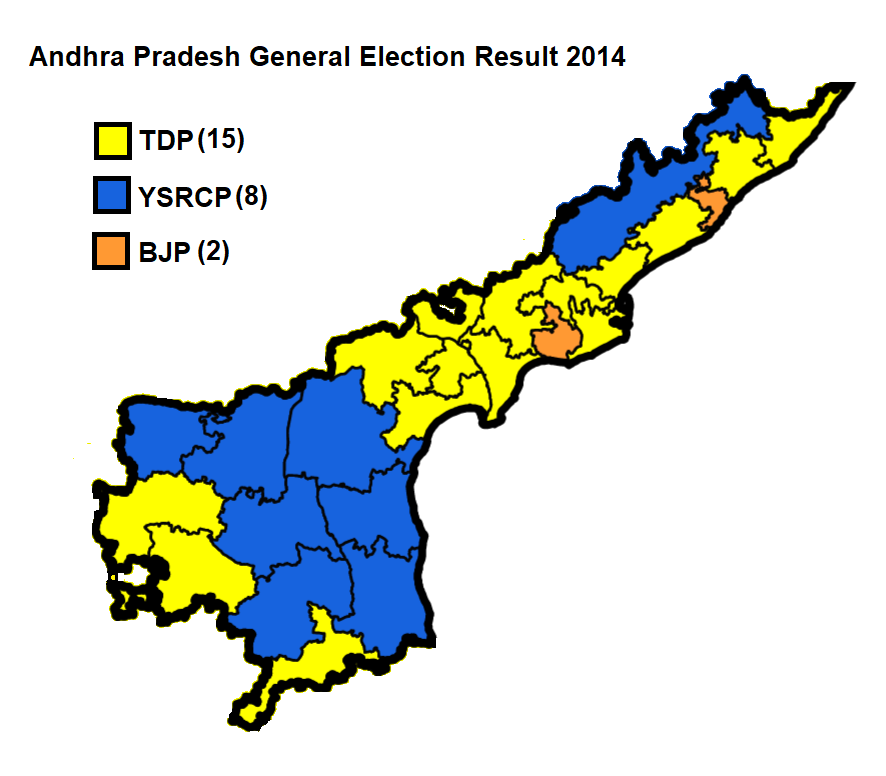
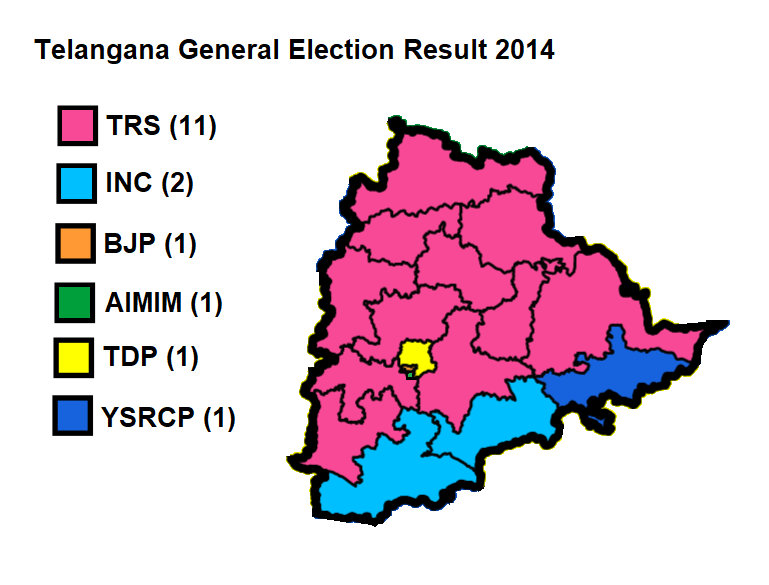
Prime Minister before election
Manmohan Singh
INC
Prime Minister after election
Narendra Modi
BJP

The 2014 Indian general election in Andhra Pradesh were held on 30 April 2014 and 7 May 2014. In Andhra Pradesh there are 25 Lok sabha constituencies and were scheduled to go for voting on 7 May 2014 and results are announced on 16 May 2014, and the new state of Telangana was carved out from Andhra Pradesh on 2 June 2014.

== Parties and alliances ==
Alliance/Party		Flag	Symbol	Leader	Seats contested	
NDA	Telugu Desam Party			N. Chandrababu Naidu	30	42
NDA	Bharatiya Janata Party			G. Kishan Reddy	12	42
UPA	Indian National Congress			Raghu Veera Reddy	41	42
UPA	Communist Party of India			K. Narayana	1	42
YSR Congress Party				Y. S. Jagan Mohan Reddy	38	
Telangana Rashtra Samithi				K. Chandrasekhar Rao	17	
All India Majlis-e-Ittehadul Muslimeen				Asaduddin Owaisi	4	
Bahujan Samaj Party				Mayawati	40	
Jai Samaikyandhra Party				Kiran Kumar Reddy	27	
Communist Party of India (Marxist)				B. V. Raghavulu	4	
Lok Satta Party				Jaya Prakash Narayana	1	

== List of Candidates ==
=== Telangana ===
Constituency		TRS		UPA		NDA		YSRCP	
#	Name	Party	Candidate	Party	Candidate	Party	Candidate	Party	Candidate
1	Adilabad (ST)	TRS	Godam Nagesh	INC	Dr. Naresh Jadhav	TDP	Ramesh Rathod	Did not contest	
2	Peddapalli (SC)	TRS	Balka Suman	INC	Gaddam Vivekanand	TDP	Dr. Janapati Sarat Babu	Did not contest	
3	Karimnagar	TRS	B. Vinod Kumar	INC	Ponnam Prabhakar	BJP	C. Vidyasagar Rao	YCP	Meesala Raji Reddy
4	Nizamabad	TRS	K. Kavitha	INC	Madhu Goud Yaskhi	BJP	Endela Lakshminarayana	YCP	Singareddy R. Reddy
5	Zahirabad	TRS	B. B. Patil	INC	Shetkar Suresh Kumar	TDP	K. Madan Mohan Rao	YCP	Mahmood Mohiuddin
6	Medak	TRS	K. Chandrashekar Rao	INC	P. Shravan Kumar Reddy	BJP	Chaganla Narendra Nath	YCP	Prabhugoud Pullaiahgari
7	Malkajgiri	TRS	M. Hanumanth Rao	INC	Sarve Satyanarayana	TDP	Chamakura Malla Reddy	YCP	V. Dinesh Reddy
8	Secunderabad	TRS	T. Bheemsen	INC	Anjan Kumar Yadav	BJP	Bandaru Dattatreya	YCP	Syed Sajid Ali
9	Hyderabad	TRS	Rashid Shareef	INC	S. Krishna Reddy	BJP	Bhagavanth Rao	YCP	Boddu Sainath Reddy
10	Chevella	TRS	Konda Reddy	INC	Patlolla Kartik Reddy	TDP	Tulla Veerender Goud	YCP	Konda Raghava Reddy
11	Mahabubnagar	TRS	A. P. Jithender Reddy	INC	Jaipal Reddy	BJP	Nagam Janardhan Reddy	YCP	H. A. Rahman
12	Nagarkurnool (SC)	TRS	Manda Jagannath	INC	Nandi Yellaiah	TDP	Bakkani Narsimlu	YCP	Maredu Gopal
13	Nalgonda	TRS	Palla Rajeshwar Reddy	INC	Gutha Sukender Reddy	TDP	Tera Chinnapa Reddy	YCP	Gunnam Nagi Reddy
14	Bhongir	TRS	Boora Narsaiah Goud	INC	Komatireddy Reddy	BJP	N. Indrasena Reddy	Did not contest	
15	Warangal (SC)	TRS	Pasunuri Dayakar	INC	Siricilla Rajaiah	BJP	Pagidipati Devaiah	Did not contest	
16	Mahabubabad (ST)	TRS	Sitaram Naik	INC	Balram Naik	TDP	Banoth Mohanlal	YCP	Tellam Venkata Rao
17	Khammam	TRS	Budan Baig Shaik	CPI	Kankanala Narayana	TDP	Nama Nageswara Rao	YCP	Ponguleti S. Reddy

=== Andhra Pradesh ===
Constituency		YSRCP		NDA		UPA	
#	Name	Party	Candidate	Party	Candidate	Party	Candidate
18	Araku (ST)	YSRCP	Kothapalli Geetha	TDP	Gummadi Sandhya Rani	INC	Kishore Chandra Deo
19	Srikakulam	YSRCP	Reddy Shanthi	TDP	K. Ram Mohan Naidu	INC	Killi Krupa Rani
20	Vizianagaram	YSRCP	Bellana Chandra Sekhar	TDP	Ashok Gajapathi Raju	INC	Yedla Adiraju
21	Visakhapatnam	YSRCP	Y. S. Vijayamma	BJP	Kambhampati Hari Babu	INC	Bolisetti Satyanarayana
22	Anakapalle	YSRCP	Gudivada Amarnadh	TDP	Muttamsetti Srinivasa Rao	INC	Vijaya Lakshmi Thota
23	Kakinada	YSRCP	Chalamalasetti Sunil	TDP	Thota Narasimham	INC	M. M. Pallam Raju
24	Amalapuram (SC)	YSRCP	Pinipe Viswarupu	TDP	Pandula Ravindra Babu	INC	A. J. V. Butchi M. Rao
25	Rajahmundry	YSRCP	Margani Bharat	TDP	Maganti Roopa	INC	Nalluri Vijaya Srinivasa
26	Narasapuram	YSRCP	Vanka Ravindranath	BJP	Gokaraju Ganga Raju	INC	Kanumuri Bapi Raju
27	Eluru	YSRCP	Thota Chandra Sekhar	TDP	Maganti Venkateswara Rao	INC	Musunuri Nageswara Rao
28	Machilipatnam	YSRCP	Kolusu Parthasarathy	TDP	Konakalla Narayana Rao	INC	Sistla Ramesh
29	Vijayawada	YSRCP	Koneru Rajendra Prasad	TDP	Kesineni Nani	INC	Avinash Devineni
30	Guntur	YSRCP	Vallabhaneni Balashowry	TDP	Galla Jayadev	INC	Abdul Waheed Shaik
31	Narasaraopet	YSRCP	Alla Ayodhya Rami Reddy	TDP	Rayapati Sambasiva Rao	INC	Kondapalli Venkateswarlu
32	Bapatla (SC)	YSRCP	Varikuti Amruthapani	TDP	Malyadri Sriram	INC	Panabaka Lakshmi
33	Ongole	YSRCP	Y. V. Subba Reddy	TDP	Magunta S. Reddy	INC	Darisi Pavana Kumar
34	Nandyal	YSRCP	S. P. Y. Reddy	TDP	N. Md. Farooq	INC	B. Y. Ramaiah
35	Kurnool	YSRCP	Butta Renuka	TDP	B. T. Naidu	INC	Kotla Jayasurya Prakasha
36	Anantapur	YSRCP	Anantha V. Reddy	TDP	J. C. Diwakar Reddy	INC	P. Anil Chowdary
37	Hindupur	YSRCP	D. Sreedhar Reddy	TDP	Kristappa Nimmala	INC	G. C. Venkataramudu
38	Kadapa	YSRCP	Y. S. Avinash Reddy	TDP	Srinivasa R. Reddy	INC	Ajay Kumar Veena
39	Nellore	YSRCP	Mekapati R. Reddy	TDP	Adala Prabhakara Reddy	INC	Narayana Reddy Vakati
40	Tirupati (SC)	YSRCP	Velagapalli Rao	BJP	Karumanchi Jayaram	INC	Chinta Mohan
41	Rajampet	YSRCP	P. V. Midhun Reddy	BJP	Daggubati Purandeswari	INC	Sai Prathap Annayyagari
42	Chittoor (SC)	YSRCP	G. Samanyakiran	TDP	Naramalli Sivaprasad	INC	B. Rajagopal

== Opinion polls ==
Conducted in Month(s)	Ref	Polling Organisation/Agency	Sample size					
Conducted in Month(s)	Ref	Polling Organisation/Agency	Sample size	INC	BJP	TDP	YSR Congress	TRS – AIMIM
Aug–Oct 2013		Times Now-India TV-CVoter	24,284	7	–	8	13	13
Dec 2013 – Jan 2014		India Today-CVoter	21,792	7	–	8	13	13
Jan–Feb 2014		Times Now-India TV-CVoter	14,000	6	2	10	13	10
March 2014		NDTV- Hansa Research	46,571	6	9		15	11
March–April 2014		CNN-IBN-Lokniti-CSDS	1308	4–8	13–19		9–15	4–8
April 2014		NDTV- Hansa Research	24,000	6	18		9	8
4–12 April 2014		India Today-Cicero	1358	4–6	17–21		7–11	6–10

== Polling ==
Elections were held in 2 phases i.e. 7th and 8th phases of General election 2014 on 30 April, and 7 May 2014.

=== Phase 1 ===
Polling passed off peacefully with more than 72 percent of more than 28.1 a million voters exercising their franchise in the 10 districts in the region. Chief Electoral Officer Bhanwarlal said the polling could touch 75 percent. In 2009, the percentage was 67.71 in the region

=== Phase 2 ===
Chief Electoral Officer Bhanwar Lal said around 76.80 percent of the 36.8 a million voters exercised their franchise across 175 Assembly and 25 Lok Sabha constituencies in the region and the voting percentage is likely to touch 80. The highest turnout of 82.97 percent was recorded in Guntur district and the lowest of 70 percent in Visakhapatnam district.

== Results by Party/Alliance ==
=== United Andhra Pradesh ===
Alliance/ Party		Popular vote			Seats		
Alliance/ Party		Votes	%	±pp	Contested	Won	+/−
NDA	TDP	1,40,99,230	29.15	▲4.22	30	16	▲10
NDA	BJP	40,91,908	8.46	▲4.71	12	3	▲3
NDA	Total	1,81,91,138	37.61	Steady	42	19	Steady
UPA	INC	55,78,329	11.53	▼27.42	41	2	▼31
UPA	CPI	1,87,702	0.39	▼1.19	1	0	Steady
UPA	Total	57,66,031	11.92	Steady	42	2	Steady
TRS		67,36,270	13.93	▲7.79	17	11	▲9
YSRCP		1,39,95,435	28.94	New entry	38	9	New entry
AIMIM		6,85,730	1.42	▲0.69	5	1	
BSP		3,97,567	0.82		40	0	
JaSaPa		2,04,260	0.42	New entry	27	0	New entry
CPI(M)		1,58,524	0.33	▼0.93	4	0	Steady
LSP		1,58,248	0.33		1	0	
AAP		1,02,487	0.21	New entry	21	0	New entry
Others		6,81,278	1.41	Steady	128	0	Steady
IND		9,49,666	1.96		233	0	Steady
NOTA		3,40,554	0.70				
Total		4,83,67,188	100%	-	598	42	-

=== Total by state after the split ===
Party	Andhra Pradesh			Telangana		
Party	Votes	%	Seats	Votes	%	Seats
Telugu Desam Party	11,729,219	40.80	15	2,370,011	12.30	1
YSR Congress Party	13,131,029	45.67	8	864,406	4.49	1
Telangana Rashtra Samithi				6,736,270	34.94	11
Indian National Congress	822,614	2.86	0	4,755,715	24.68	2
Bharatiya Janata Party	2,077,079	7.22	2	2,014,829	10.46	1
All India Majlis-e-Ittehadul Muslimeen	5,598	0.02	0	680,132	3.53	1
Other parties	902,947	3.14	0	1,172,681	6.08	0
Independent politician	266,507	0.93	0	683,159	3.55	0
Total (valid votes)	28,749,431	100.0	25	19,277,203	100.0	17
None of the above	185,562	0.65	–	154,992	0.80	–
Registered voters / turnout	36,760,884	78.21	–	28,173,254	68.42	–

== Detailed results ==
Constituency		Poll%	Winner				Runner Up				Margin	%
#	Name	Poll%	Candidate	Party	Votes	%	Candidate	Party	Votes	%	Margin	%
1	Adilabad	76.15	G. Nagesh	TRS	430,847	40.82	Dr. Naresh Jadhav	INC	259,557	24.59	171,290	16.38
2	Peddapalli	71.93	Balka Suman	TRS	565,496	56.82	G. Vivekanand	INC	274,338	27.57	291,158	28.48
3	Karimnagar	74.71	B. Vinod Kumar	TRS	505,783	44.93	Ponnam Prabhakar	INC	300,706	26.71	205,007	18.22
4	Nizamabad	69.10	Kalvakuntla Kavitha	TRS	439,307	42.49	Madhu Goud Yaskhi	INC	272,123	26.32	167,184	16.17
5	Zahirabad	77.28	B. B. Patil	TRS	508,661	46.46	Shetkar Suresh Kumar	INC	364,030	33.25	144,631	13.21
6	Medak	77.70	K. Chandrashekar Rao	TRS	657,492	55.20	Shravan Reddy	INC	260,463	21.87	397,029	33.33
7	Malkajgiri	50.90	Malla Reddy	TDP	523,336	32.30	M. Hanumanth Rao	TRS	494,965	30.54	28,371	1.76
8	Secunderabad	53.01	Bandaru Dattatreya	BJP	438,271	43.66	Anjan Kumar Yadav	INC	183,536	18.28	254,735	25.35
9	Hyderabad	53.30	Asaduddin Owaisi	AIMIM	513,868	52.94	Bhagavanth Rao	BJP	311,414	32.05	202,454	20.83
10	Chevella	60.51	K. Vishweshwar Reddy	TRS	435,077	33.06	P. Kartik Reddy	INC	362,054	27.51	73,023	5.55
11	Mahabubnagar	72.94	A. P. Jithender Reddy	TRS	334,228	32.94	Jaipal Reddy	INC	331,638	32.68	2,590	0.26
12	Nagarkurnool	75.55	Nandi Yellaiah	INC	420,075	37.88	Manda Jagannath	TRS	403,399	36.38	16,676	1.50
13	Nalgonda	81.42	Gutha Sukender Reddy	INC	472,093	39.63	Tera Chinnapa Reddy	TDP	278,937	23.45	193,156	16.24
14	Bhongir	81.27	Boora Narsaiah Goud	TRS	448,245	36.99	K. Raj Gopal Reddy	INC	417,751	34.47	30,494	2.52
15	Warangal	76.52	Kadiyam Srihari	TRS	661,639	56.33	Siricilla Rajaiah	INC	269,065	22.91	392,574	33.42
16	Mahabubabad	81.21	Sitaram Naik	TRS	320,569	28.51	Balram Naik	INC	285,577	25.40	34,992	3.11
17	Khammam	82.13	P. Srinivasa Reddy	YCP	421,957	35.67	Nama Nageswara Rao	TDP	409,983	34.66	11,974	1.01
18	Araku	72.92	Kothapalli Geetha	YCP	413,191	45.42	Gummadi Sandhya Rani	TDP	259,557	24.59	171,290	16.38
19	Srikakulam	74.36	Ram Mohan Naidu Kinjarapu	TDP	556,163	52.90	Reddy Shanthi	YCP	428,591	40.76	127,572	12.14
20	Vizianagaram	79.79	Ashok Gajapathi Raju	TDP	536,549	47.89	Ravu Venkata Swetha	YCP	429,638	38.35	106,911	9.54
21	Visakhapatnam	67.54	Kambhampati Hari Babu	BJP	566,832	48.71	Y. S. Vijayamma	YCP	476,344	40.94	90,488	7.78
22	Anakapalle	81.92	Muttamsetti Srinivasa Rao	TDP	568,463	49.51	Gudivada Amarnath	YCP	520,531	45.34	47,932	4.17
23	Kakinada	77.68	Thota Narasimham	TDP	514,402	46.76	Chalamalasetti Sunil	YCP	510,971	46.45	3,431	0.31
24	Amalapuram	82.55	Pandula Ravindra Babu	TDP	594,547	53.04	Pinipe Viswarupu	YCP	473,971	42.28	120,576	10.76
25	Rajahmundry	81.22	Murali Mohan	TDP	630,573	54.62	Boddu Chowdary	YCP	463,139	40.12	167,434	14.50
26	Narasapuram	82.19	Gokaraju Ganga Raju	BJP	540,306	49.61	Vanka Ravindranath	YCP	454,955	41.77	85,351	7.84
27	Eluru	84.17	Maganti Venkateswara Rao	TDP	623,471	51.88	Thota Chandra Sekhar	YCP	521,545	43.40	101,926	8.48
28	Machilipatnam	83.33	Konakalla Narayana Rao	TDP	587,280	51.47	Kolusu Parthasarathy	YCP	506,223	44.36	81,057	7.11
29	Vijayawada	76.39	Kesineni Srinivas (Nani)	TDP	592,696	49.59	Koneru Rajendra Prasad	YCP	517,834	43.72	74,862	6.26
30	Guntur	79.20	Galla Jayadev	TDP	618,417	49.67	Vallabhaneni Balashowry	YCP	549,306	44.12	69,111	5.55
31	Narasaraopet	84.63	Rayapati Sambasiva Rao	TDP	632,464	49.33	Alla Ayodhya Rami Reddy	YCP	597,184	46.58	35,280	2.75
32	Bapatla	85.04	Malyadri Sriram	TDP	578,145	48.80	Varikuti Amruthapani	YCP	545,391	46.04	32,754	2.76
33	Ongole	82.17	Y. V. Subba Reddy	YCP	589,960	48.83	Magunta Sreenivasulu Reddy	TDP	574,302	47.53	15,658	1.30
34	Nandyal	76.71	S. P. Y. Reddy	YCP	622,411	51.65	N. M. D. Farooq	TDP	516,645	42.88	105,766	9.13
35	Kurnool	71.92	Butta Renuka	YCP	472,782	44.36	B. T. Naidu	TDP	428,651	40.22	44,131	4.14
36	Anantapur	78.41	J. C. Diwakar Reddy	TDP	606,509	50.33	Anantha Venkatarami Reddy	YCP	545,240	45.25	61,269	5.08
37	Hindupur	81.39	Kristappa Nimmala	TDP	604,291	51.33	Duddukunta Sreedhar Reddy	YCP	506,966	43.06	97,325	8.27
38	Kadapa	77.45	Y. S. Avinash Reddy	YCP	671,983	55.95	Reddeppagari S. Reddy	TDP	481,660	40.10	190,323	15.85
39	Nellore	74.02	Mekapati Rajamohan Reddy	YCP	576,396	48.53	Adala Prabhakara Reddy	TDP	562,918	47.40	13,478	1.13
40	Tirupati	77.04	Varaprasad Rao Velagapalli	YCP	580,376	47.84	Karumanchi Jayaram	BJP	542,915	44.76	37,425	3.08
41	Rajampet	77.87	P. V. Midhun Reddy	YCP	601,752	51.95	Daggubati Purandeswari	BJP	426,990	36.86	174,762	15.09
42	Chittoor	82.59	Naramalli Sivaprasad	TDP	594,862	49.62	G. Samanyakiran	YCP	550,724	45.94	44,138	3.68

== Post-election Union Council of Ministers from Andhra Pradesh ==
#	Name	Constituency	Designation	Department	From	To	Party
1	Ashok Gajapathi Raju	Vizianagaram	Cabinet Minister	Civil Aviation	27 May 2014	9 March 2018	TDP
2	Y. S. Chowdary	Rajya Sabha (Andhra Pradesh)	MoS	Science and Technology; Earth Sciences	9 November 2014	9 March 2018	TDP
3	Nirmala Sitharaman (Note: Nirmala Sitharaman represented Andhra Pradesh in the Rajya Sabha until 1 July 2016, after which she represented Karnataka.)	Rajya Sabha (Andhra Pradesh)	MoS (I/C)	Commerce and Industry	27 May 2014	3 September 2017	BJP
3	Nirmala Sitharaman	Rajya Sabha (Andhra Pradesh)	MoS	Finance; Corporate Affairs	27 May 2014	9 November 2014	BJP
4	Suresh Prabhu (Note: Suresh Prabhu represented Haryana in the Rajya Sabha until 22 June 2016, after which he represented Andhra Pradesh for the remainder of the term.)	Rajya Sabha (Andhra Pradesh)	Cabinet Minister	Railways	9 November 2014	3 September 2017	BJP
4	Suresh Prabhu	Rajya Sabha (Andhra Pradesh)	Cabinet Minister	Commerce and Industry	3 September 2017	30 May 2019	BJP
4	Suresh Prabhu	Rajya Sabha (Andhra Pradesh)	Cabinet Minister	Civil Aviation	10 March 2018	30 May 2019	BJP
5	Bandaru Dattatreya	Secunderabad	MoS(I/C)	Labour & Employment	9 Nov 2014	3 Sept 2017	BJP

== Assembly Segment wise lead ==
=== Andhra Pradesh ===
Party	Assembly segments	Position in Assembly (as of 2014 election)
Telugu Desam Party	96	102
Y. S. R. Congress Party	65	67
Bharatiya Janata Party	14	4
Others	0	2
Total	175	

=== Telangana ===
Party	Assembly segments	Position in Assembly (as of 2014 election)
Telangana Rashtra Samithi	67	63
Indian National Congress	18	21
Telugu Desam Party	8	15
Bharatiya Janata Party	12	5
All India Majlis-e-Ittehadul Muslimeen	7	7
Y. S. R. Congress Party	7	3
Others	0	5
Total	119	

== By-Election ==
Date	Constituency	MP before election	Party before election	Reason	Elected MP	Party after election
2014	Medak	K. Chandrashekar Rao	Telangana Rashtra Samithi	(Note: KCR won both the Medak Lok Sabha seat and the Gajwel Assembly seat in 2014. After becoming Telangana's first Chief Minister, he chose to keep the Gajwel seat and vacated Medak, which led to a by-election. The by-poll was won by TRS candidate Kotha Kotha Prabhakar Reddy with a massive margin of over 3.6 lakh votes.)	Kotha Prabhakar Reddy	Telangana Rashtra Samithi
2015	Warangal	Kadiyam Srihari	Telangana Rashtra Samithi	(Note: The 2015 Warangal Lok Sabha by-election was held because the sitting MP, Kadiyam Srihari, resigned after being appointed as Telangana's Deputy Chief Minister. This created a vacancy that required a by-poll. The election was won by Pasunuri Dayakar of the TRS.)	Pasunuri Dayakar	Telangana Rashtra Samithi
