= 2004 Indian general election in Andhra Pradesh =

Indian general election in United Andhra Pradesh, 2004
- April–May 2004

42 seats
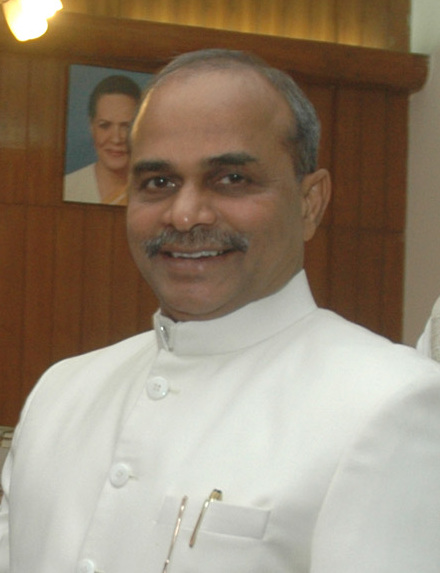

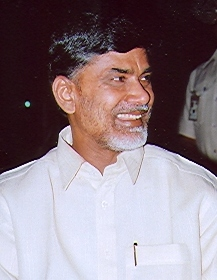

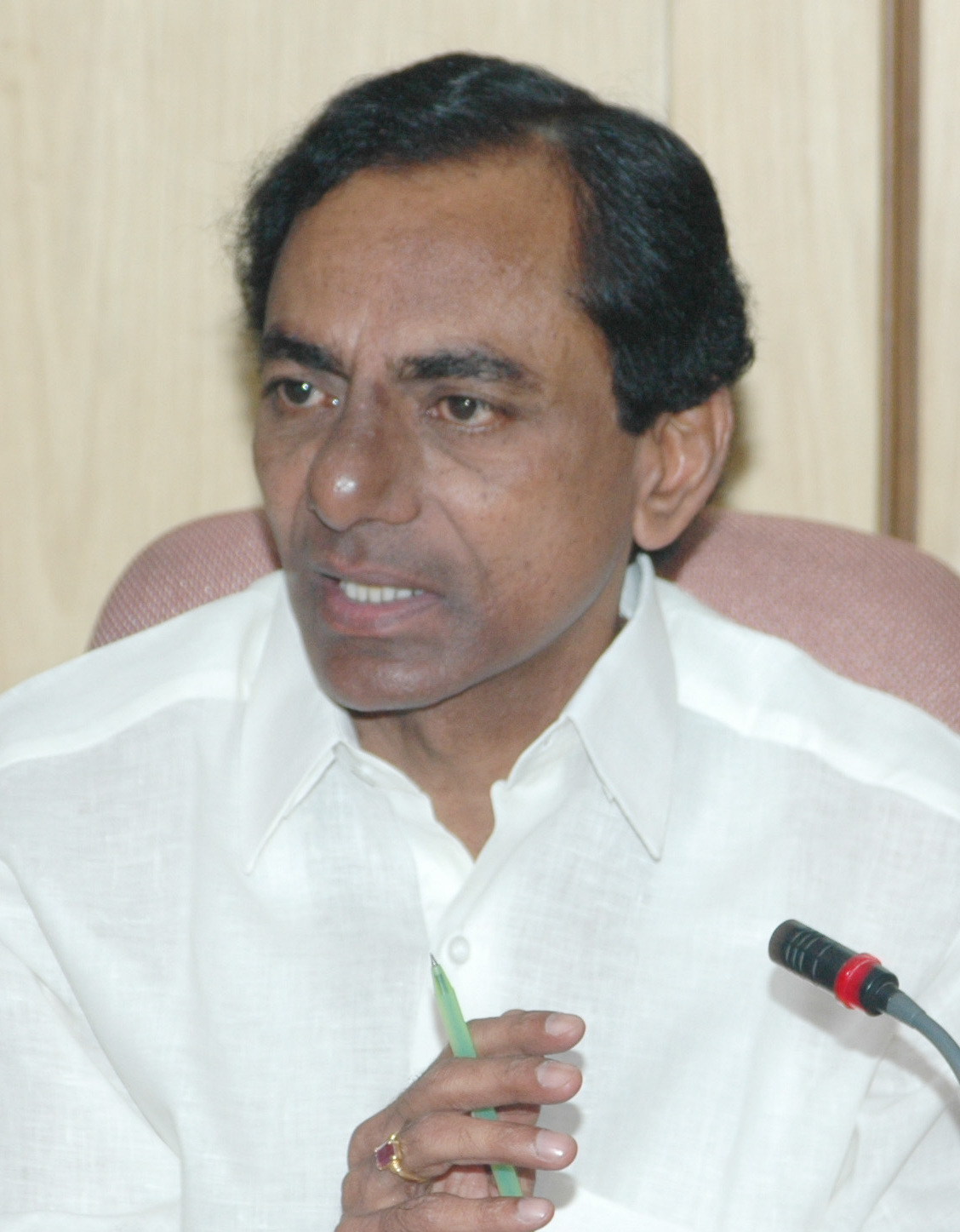
	First party	Second party	Third party
Leader	Y.S. Rajasekhara Reddy	N. Chandrababu Naidu	K. Chandrasekhar Rao
Party	INC	TDP	TRS
Alliance	INC+ (post poll UPA)	NDA	INC+ (post poll UPA)
Leader's seat	None	None	Karimnagar
Last election	5	29	new party
Seats won	29	5	5
Seat change	▲24	▼24	▲5
Popular vote	17,303,389	14,850,829	2,441,405
Percentage	48.4	41.5	6.83%
Swing	▲8.5%	▼1.3%	▲6.83%
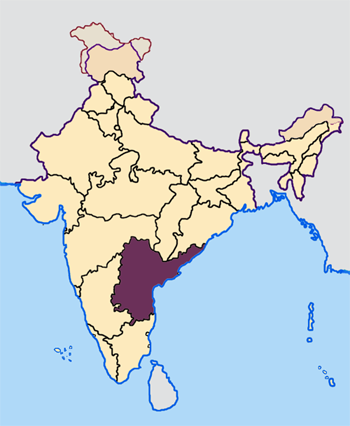
- United Andhra Pradesh
Prime Minister before election
A. B. Vajpayee
BJP
Prime Minister after election
Manmohan Singh
INC

In United Andhra Pradesh, the general elections and state assembly elections were held simultaneously. In both, the ruling Telugu Desam Party-Bharatiya Janata Party (TDP-BJP) combine was routed. BJP could not win a single seat. The result was a landslide victory for the United Progressive Alliance which won 34 out of 42 seats, which reflects the state elections that occurred before the general elections, where National Democratic Alliance (NDA) member, TDP, was defeated soundly by Y.S. Rajasekhara Reddy and the Indian National Congress. Alliance with CPM and CPI helped the Congress party. Congress had contested in alliance with the communist parties and the TRS.

== Election schedule ==
The election commission had appointed its total of 126 observers in the state in view of the preparations.

The filing of nomination along with voting was carried by the Election Commission in three days as:

Poll event	Phase	
Poll event	I	II
Notification date	24 March 2004	31 March 2004
Last date for filing the nomination	31 March 2004	7 April 2004
Date of Scrutiny	2 April 2004	8 April 2004
Last date for withdrawal of nomination	5 April 2004	10 April 2004
Date of poll	20 April 2004	26 April 2004
Date of counting	13 May 2004	

Voting Phases
I (21 seats)	II (21 seats)
Srikakulam; Parvathipuram; Bobbili; Visakhapatnam; Bhadrachalam; Anakapalli; Nagarkurnool; Mahabubnagar; Hyderabad; Secunderabad; Siddipet; Medak; Nizamabad; Adilabad; Peddapalli; Karimnagar; Hanamkonda; Warangal; Khammam; Nalgonda; Miryalguda	Kakinada; Rajahmundry; Amalapuram; Narasapur; Eluru; Machilipatnam; Vijayawada; Tenali; Guntur; Bapatla; Narasaraopet; Ongole; Nellore; Tirupathi; Chittoor; Rajampet; Cuddapah; Hindupur; Anantapur; Kurnool; Nandyal

== Parties and alliances ==
Alliance/Party		Flag	Symbol	Leader	Seats contested	
NDA	Telugu Desam Party			N. Chandrababu Naidu	33	42
NDA	Bharatiya Janata Party			Vidyasagar Rao	9	42
UPA	Indian National Congress			Y. S. Rajasekhara Reddy	34	41
UPA	Telangana Rashtra Samithi			K. Chandrasekhar Rao	5	41
UPA	Communist Party of India (Marxist)			Babu Rao Mediyam	1	41
UPA	Communist Party of India			Sudhakar Reddy	1	41
All India Majlis-e-Ittehadul Muslimeen				Asaduddin Owaisi	1	

== Candidates ==
Constituency		UPA (Note: There were friendly contests between INC and TRS in the following parliamentary constituencies: 3 Bobilli, 11 Eluru, 12 Machilipatnam, 13 Vijayawada, 14 Tenali, 15 Guntur, 16 Bapatla, 17 Narasaraopet, 20 Tirupathi (SC), 21 Chittoor, 22 Rajampet, 23 Cuddapah, 24 Hindupur, 25 Anantapur, 26 Kurnool, and 27 Nandyal.)		NDA	
#	Name	Party	Candidate	Party	Candidate
1	Srikakulam	INC	Killi Kruparani	TDP	Yerrannaidu Kinjarapu
2	Parvathipuram	INC	Kishore Chandra Deo	TDP	D. V. G. Sankara Rao
3	Bobbili	INC	Jhansi Botcha	TDP	Kondapalli Pydithalli Naidu
4	Visakhapatnam	INC	N. Janardhana Reddy	TDP	M. V. V. S. Murthi
5	Bhadrachalam	CPM	Babu Rao Mediyam	TDP	K. P. R. K Phaneeswaramma
6	Anakapalli	INC	Nanda Gopal Gandham	TDP	Pappala Chalapathirao
7	Kakinada	INC	M. M. Pallam Raju	TDP	Mudragada Padmanabham
8	Rajahmundry	INC	Aruna Kumar Vundavalli	BJP	Kantipudi Sarvarayudu
9	Amalapuram	INC	G. V. Harsha Kumar	TDP	Janardhana Rao Dunna
10	Narasapur	INC	C. Harirama Jogaiah	BJP	Krishnam Raju
11	Eluru	INC	Kavuri Samba Siva Rao	TDP	Bolla Bulli Ramaiah
12	Machilipatnam	INC	Badiga Ramakrishna	TDP	Ambati Brahmanaiah
13	Vijayawada	INC	Lagadapati Rajagopal	TDP	C. Aswini Dutt
14	Tenali	INC	Vallabhaneni Balashowry	TDP	Ummareddy Venkateswarlu
15	Guntur	INC	Rayapati Sambasiva Rao	TDP	Yadlapati Venkata Rao
16	Bapatla	INC	Daggubati Purandeswari	TDP	D. Ramanaidu
17	Narasaraopet	INC	M. Rajamohan Reddy	TDP	Maddi Lakshmaiah
18	Ongole	INC	M. Sreenivasulu Reddy	TDP	Bathula Vijaya Bharathi
19	Nellore	INC	Panabaka Lakshmi	BJP	Karupotala Balakondaiah
20	Tirupathi	INC	Chinta Mohan	BJP	Dr N Venkata Swamy
21	Chittoor	INC	Ravuri Venkata Swamy	TDP	D. K. Adikesavulu Naidu
22	Rajampet	INC	Annayyagari Sai Prathap	TDP	Gunipati Ramaiah
23	Cuddapah	INC	Y. S. Vivekananda Reddy	TDP	M. V. Mysura Reddy
24	Hindupur	INC	G. Nizamuddin	TDP	B. K. Parthasarathi
25	Anantapur	INC	A. Venkatarami Reddy	TDP	Kalava Srinivasulu
26	Kurnool	INC	Jayasurya Prakasha Reddy	TDP	K. E. Krishna Murthy
27	Nandyal	INC	S. P. Y. Reddy	TDP	Bhuma Nagi Reddy
28	Nagarkurnool	(Note: There was no candidate from the UPA (INC, TRS, CPI and CPI(M)) in Constituency 28 Nagarkurnool.)		TDP	Manda Jagannath
29	Mahabubnagar	INC	Devarakonda Vittal Rao	TDP	Yelkoti Yella Reddy
30	Hyderabad	INC	Konda Lakshma Reddy	BJP	G Subhash Chanderji
31	Secunderabad	INC	Anjan Kumar Yadav	BJP	Bandaru Dattatreya
32	Siddipet	INC	Sarve Satyanarayana	TDP	Dr K Lingaiah
33	Medak	TRS	A. Narendra	BJP	P Ramchandra Reddy
34	Nizamabad	INC	Madhu Goud Yaskhi	TDP	Syed Yusuf Ali
35	Adilabad	TRS	Madhusudhan Reddy	TDP	Dr S Venugopala Chary
36	Peddapalli	INC	G. Venkat Swamy	TDP	Dr Mt C Suguna
37	Karimnagar	TRS	K. Chandrashekar Rao	BJP	V. Chennamaneni Rao
38	Hanamkonda	TRS	B. Vinod Kumar	TDP	Suresh Chada Reddy
39	Warangal	TRS	Dharavath Ravinder Naik	TDP	Bodakunti Venkateshwarlu
40	Khammam	INC	Renuka Chowdhury	TDP	Nama Nageswara Rao
41	Nalgonda	CPI	S. Sudhakar Reddy (Note: Friendly contest between TRS and CPI in constituency 41 Nalgonda, which is not listed.)	BJP	N. Indrasena Reddy
42	Miryalguda	INC	Jaipal Reddy	TDP	Swamy Vangala Goud

== Voting and results ==
=== Results by Alliance ===
Alliance/ Party		Popular vote			Seats		
Alliance/ Party		Votes	%	±pp	Contested	Won	+/−
UPA	INC	1,48,61,984	41.56	▼1.23	34	29	▲24
UPA	TRS	24,41,405	6.83	New	5 + 17	5	▲5
UPA	CPI	4,79,511	1.34	▲0.01	1	1	▲1
UPA	CPI(M)	3,73,148	1.04	▼0.36	1	1	▲1
UPA	Total	1,81,56,048	50.77	Steady	41	36	Steady
NDA	TDP	1,18,44,811	33.12	▼6.73	33	5	▼24
NDA	BJP	30,06,018	8.41	▼1.49	9	0	▼7
NDA	Total	1,48,50,829	41.53	▼8.22	42	5	▼31
AIMIM		4,17,248	1.17	▼0.17	2	1	Steady
Others		8,55,130	2.39	Steady	63	0	Steady
IND		14,83,415	4.15	▲2.74	114	0	Steady
Total		3,57,62,670	100%	-	279	42	-

== Results by constituency ==
Constituency		Winner				Runner Up				Margin	%
#	Name	Candidate	Party	Votes	%	Candidate	Party	Votes	%	Margin	%
1	Srikakulam	Kinjarapu Yerran Naidu	TDP	361,906	50.00	Killi Krupa Rani	INC	330,027	45.60	31,879	4.40
2	Parvathipuram (ST)	Kishore Chandra Deo	INC	321,788	48.69	D. V. G. Sankara Rao	TDP	314,370	47.57	7,418	1.12
3	Bobbili	Kondapalli Pydithalli Naidu	TDP	373,922	50.07	Botsa Jhansi Lakshmi	INC	342,574	45.88	31,348	4.20
4	Visakhapatnam	N. Janardhana Reddy	INC	524,122	54.27	M. V. V. S. Murthi	TDP	393,551	40.75	130,571	13.52
5	Bhadrachalam (ST)	Babu Rao Mediyam	CPI(M)	373,148	45.32	Smt. K. P. R. K Phaneeswaramma	TDP	319,342	38.78	53,806	6.53
6	Anakapalli	Pappala Chalapathirao	TDP	385,406	49.28	Nanda Gopal Gandham	INC	369,992	47.31	15,414	1.97
7	Kakinada	M. M. Pallam Raju	INC	410,982	49.38	Mudragada Padmanabha Reddy	TDP	353,730	42.50	57,252	6.88
8	Rajahmundry	Vundavalli Aruna Kumar	INC	413,927	50.72	Kantipudi Sarvarayudu	BJP	265,107	32.48	148,820	18.23
9	Amalapuram (SC)	G. V. Harsha Kumar	INC	350,346	49.75	Dunna Janardhana Rao	TDP	308,861	43.86	41,485	5.89
10	Narasapur	Chegondi Harirama Jogaiah	INC	402,761	52.41	Krishnam Raju	BJP	338,349	44.03	64,412	8.38
11	Eluru	Kavuri Samba Siva Rao	INC	499,191	55.65	Bolla Bulli Ramaiah	TDP	375,900	41.91	123,291	13.75
12	Machilipatnam	Badiga Ramakrishna	INC	387,127	51.25	Ambati Brahmanaiah	TDP	336,786	44.59	50,341	6.66
13	Vijayawada	Rajagopal Lagadapati	INC	519,624	54.95	C. Aswini Dutt	TDP	405,037	42.84	114,587	12.12
14	Tenali	Vallabhaneni Balashowry	INC	366,843	54.47	Ummareddy Venkateswarlu	TDP	288,287	42.81	78,556	11.66
15	Guntur	Rayapati Sambasiva Rao	INC	466,221	56.75	Yemparala Venkateswara Rao	TDP	336,429	40.95	129,792	15.80
16	Bapatla	Daggubati Purandeswari	INC	411,099	55.90	D. Ramanaidu	TDP	317,017	43.10	94,082	12.79
17	Narasaraopet	Mekapati Rajamohan Reddy	INC	481,310	53.49	Maddi Lakshmaiah	TDP	395,055	43.91	86,255	9.59
18	Ongole	Magunta Sreenivasulu Reddy	INC	446,584	55.89	Bathula Vijaya Bharathi	TDP	340,563	42.62	106,021	13.27
19	Nellore (SC)	Panabaka Lakshmi	INC	450,129	53.81	Balakondaiah Karupotala	BJP	321,905	38.48	128,224	15.33
20	Tirupathi (SC)	Chinta Mohan	INC	510,961	60.06	Dr. N. Venkata Swamy	BJP	311,633	36.63	199,328	23.43
21	Chittoor	D. K. Adikesavulu Naidu	TDP	454,128	51.84	Dr. Ravuri Venkata Swamy	INC	391,990	44.75	62,138	7.09
22	Rajampet	Annayyagari Sai Prathap	INC	369,797	53.49	Gunipati Ramaiah	TDP	291,712	42.20	78,085	11.29
23	Cuddapah	Y. S. Vivekananda Reddy	INC	461,431	56.33	M. V. Mysura Reddy	TDP	329,757	40.25	131,674	16.07
24	Hindupur	G. Nizamuddin	INC	419,744	48.35	B. K. Parthasarathi	TDP	417,904	48.14	1,840	0.21
25	Anantapur	Anantha Venkatarami Reddy	INC	458,925	52.44	Kalava Srinivasulu	TDP	385,521	44.05	73,404	8.39
26	Kurnool	Kotla Jayasurya Prakasha Reddy	INC	433,529	52.95	K. E. Krishna Murthy	TDP	332,431	40.60	101,098	12.35
27	Nandyal	S. P. Y. Reddy	INC	458,526	55.25	Bhuma Shobha Nagi Reddy	TDP	346,847	41.79	111,679	13.46
28	Nagarkurnool (SC)	Manda Jagannath	TDP	405,046	45.85	K. S. Ratnam	IND	305,396	34.57	99,650	11.28
29	Mahabubnagar	Devarakonda Vittal Rao	INC	428,764	49.48	Yeloti Yella Reddy	TDP	380,857	43.95	47,907	5.53
30	Hyderabad	Asaduddin Owaisi	AIMIM	378,854	38.39	G. Subash Chanderji	BJP	278,709	28.25	100,145	10.15
31	Secunderabad	Anjan Kumar Yadav	INC	485,710	49.90	Bandaru Dattatraya	BJP	416,952	42.84	68,758	7.06
32	Siddipet (SC)	Sarve Satyanarayana	INC	593,879	53.03	Dr. K. Lingaih	TDP	454,907	40.62	138,972	12.41
33	Medak	Ale Narendra	TRS	453,738	50.36	P. Ramachandra Reddy	BJP	329,972	36.62	123,766	13.74
34	Nizamabad	Madhu Goud Yaskhi	INC	442,142	56.51	Syed Yousuf Ali	TDP	304,271	38.89	137,871	17.62
35	Adilabad	Madhusudhan Reddy Takkala	TRS	415,429	49.97	Samudrala Venugopal Chary	TDP	374,455	45.04	40,974	4.93
36	Peddapalli (SC)	Gaddam Venkatswamy	INC	572,207	60.91	Dr. Mt. C. Suguna	TDP	309,072	32.90	263,135	28.01
37	Karimnagar	K. Chandrashekar Rao	TRS	451,199	51.60	C. Vidyasagar Rao	BJP	320,031	36.60	131,168	15.00
38	Hanamkonda	B. Vinod Kumar	TRS	496,048	59.63	Chada Suresh Reddy	TDP	278,981	33.53	217,067	26.09
39	Warangal	Dharavath Ravinder Naik	TRS	427,601	46.38	Bodakunti Venkateshwarlu	TDP	408,339	44.29	19,262	2.09
40	Khammam	Renuka Chowdhury	INC	518,047	50.63	Nama Nageswara Rao	TDP	409,159	39.99	108,888	10.64
41	Nalgonda	Suravaram Sudhakar Reddy	CPI	479,511	45.76	N. Indrasena Reddy	BJP	423,360	40.40	56,151	5.36
42	Miryalguda	Jaipal Reddy	INC	572,169	59.44	Vangala Swamy Goud	TDP	355,262	36.91	216,907	22.53

== By-elections (2004-09) ==
#	Year	Constituency	MP before election	Party before election	Elected MP	Party after election
1	2006	Karimnagar	K. Chandrashekar Rao	Telangana Rashtra Samithi	K. Chandrashekar Rao	Telangana Rashtra Samithi
2	2006	Bobbili	Kondapalli Pydithalli Naidu	Telugu Desam Party	Botsa Jhansi Lakshmi	Indian National Congress
3	2008	Karimnagar	K. Chandrashekar Rao	Telangana Rashtra Samithi	K. Chandrashekar Rao	Telangana Rashtra Samithi
4	2008	Adilabad	Madhusudhan Reddy Takkala	Telangana Rashtra Samithi	Allola Indrakaran Reddy	Indian National Congress
5	2008	Hanamkonda	B. Vinod Kumar	Telangana Rashtra Samithi	B. Vinod Kumar	Telangana Rashtra Samithi
6	2008	Warangal	Dharavath Ravinder Naik	Telangana Rashtra Samithi	Errabelli Dayakar Rao	Telugu Desam Party

== Post-election Union Council of Ministers from Andhra Pradesh ==
#	Name	Constituency	Designation	Department	From	To	Party
1	Jaipal Reddy	Miryalguda	Cabinet Minister	Information and Broadcasting	23 May 2004	18 Nov 2005	INC
1	Jaipal Reddy	Miryalguda	Cabinet Minister	Culture	23 May 2004	29 Jan 2006	INC
1	Jaipal Reddy	Miryalguda	Cabinet Minister	Urban Development	18 Nov 2005	22 May 2009	INC
2	K. Chandrashekhar Rao	Karimnagar	Cabinet Minister	Shipping	23 May 2004	25 May 2004	TRS
2	K. Chandrashekhar Rao	Karimnagar	Cabinet Minister	Minister without portfolio	25 May 2004	27 Nov 2004	TRS
2	K. Chandrashekhar Rao	Karimnagar	Cabinet Minister	Labour and Employment	27 Nov 2004	24 Aug 2006	TRS
3	Renuka Chowdhury	Khammam	MoS(I/C)	Tourism	23 May 2004	29 Jan 2006	INC
3	Renuka Chowdhury	Khammam	MoS(I/C)	Women and Child Development	29 Jan 2006	22 May 2009	INC
4	Panabaka Lakshmi	Nellore (SC)	MoS	Health and Family Welfare	23 May 2004	29 March 2009	INC
4	Panabaka Lakshmi	Nellore (SC)	MoS(I/C)	Health and Family Welfare	29 March 2009	22 May 2009	INC
5	Ale Narendra	Medak	MoS	Rural Development	23 May 2004	24 Aug 2006	TRS
6	M. M. Pallam Raju	Kakinada	MoS	Defence	29 Jan 2006	22 May 2009	INC
7	Daggubati Purandeswari	Bapatla	MoS	Human Resource Development	29 Jan 2006	22 May 2009	INC

== Assembly Segment wise lead ==
Party	Assembly segments	Position in Assembly (as of 2004 election)
Indian National Congress	190	185
Telugu Desam Party	51	47
Telangana Rashtra Samithi	29	26
Bharatiya Janata Party	8	2
Communist Party of India (Marxist)	5	9
Communist Party of India	5	6
All India Majlis-e-Ittehadul Muslimeen	4	4
Others	2	15
Total	294	
