= Wardhanapet Assembly constituency =

Constituency of the Telangana legislative assembly in India

Coordinates: 17.77°N 79.57°E

Wardhannapet
- Constituency No. 107 for the Telangana Legislative Assembly
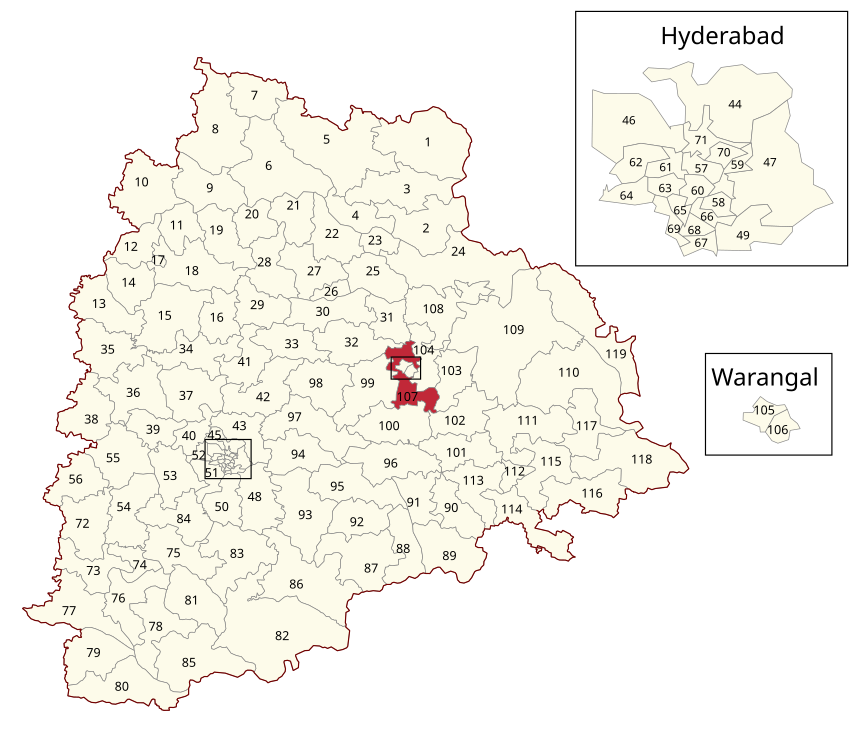
- Location of Waradhanapet Assembly constituency within Telangana

Constituency details
- Country: India
- Region: South India
- State: Telangana
- District: Warangal (2 Mandals) and Hanamkonda (2 Mandals)
- Lok Sabha constituency: Warangal
- Established: 1951
- Total electors: 224,760
- Reservation: SC

Member of Legislative Assembly
- 3rd Telangana Legislative Assembly
- Incumbent K. R. Naga Raju
- Party: INC
- Elected year: 2023

Wardhanapet Assembly constituency is a Scheduled Caste reserved constituency in Warangal district and Hanamkonda district of Telangana that elects representatives to the Telangana Legislative Assembly in India. It is one of the seven assembly segments of Warangal Lok Sabha constituency.

K. R. Nagaraj is the current MLA of the constituency, having won the 2023 Telangana Legislative Assembly election from Indian National Congress.

== Mandals ==
The Assembly Constituency presently comprises the following Mandals:

Mandal	Districts
Wardhannapet	Warangal
Hanamakonda	Hanamkonda
Parvathagiri	Warangal
Hasanparthy	Hanamkonda

== Members of Legislative Assembly ==
Year	Member	Political party
Hyderabad State
1952	Pendyala Raghava Rao	People's Democratic Front
Andhra Pradesh
1957	E. Venkataramnarsaiah	Indian National Congress
1962	Kundour Lakshminarasimha Reddy	Independent
1967	T. Purushotham Rao	Independent
1972	T. Purushotham Rao	Independent
1978	Macherla Jagannadham	Janata Party
1983	Macherla Jagannadham	Indian National Congress
1985	Vannala Sreeramulu	Bharatiya Janata Party
1989	Takkallapalli Rajeshwar Rao	Bharatiya Janata Party
1994	Errabelli Dayakar Rao	Telugu Desam Party
1999	Errabelli Dayakar Rao	Telugu Desam Party
2004	Errabelli Dayakar Rao	Telugu Desam Party
2009	Kondeti Sridhar	Indian National Congress
Telangana
2014	Aroori Ramesh	Telangana Rashtra Samithi
2018	Aroori Ramesh	Telangana Rashtra Samithi
2023	K. R. Nagaraj	Indian National Congress

== Election results ==
=== 2023 ===
2023 Telangana Legislative Assembly election: Waradhanapet (SC)
Party	Candidate	Votes	%	±%
INC	K. R. Nagaraj	106,696	48.77	
BRS	Aroori Ramesh	87,238	39.88	
BJP	Kondeti Shridhar	12,275	5.61	
NOTA	None of the Above	3,612	1.65	
Majority		19,458	8.89	
Turnout		218,776	81.22	
INC gain from BRS		Swing		

=== 2018 ===
2018 Telangana Legislative Assembly election: Wardhanapet (SC)
Party	Candidate	Votes	%	±%
TRS	Aroori Ramesh	131,252	69.35	
TJS	Devaiah Pagidipati	32,012	16.91	
CPI(ML)L	Chilumulla Lenin	6,367	3.36	
BJP	Kotha Saranga Rao	6,114	3.23	
NOTA	None of the Above	5,864	3.10	
Majority		99,240	52.44	
Turnout		189,269	83.92	
TRS hold		Swing		

=== 2014 ===
2014 Telangana Legislative Assembly election: Wardhanapet (SC)
Party	Candidate	Votes	%	±%
TRS	Aroori Ramesh	117,708	66.15	
INC	Kondeti Sridhar	30,825	17.32	
MASP	Manda Krishna Madiga	20,425	11.48	
NOTA	None of the Above	2,244	1.26	
Majority		86,883	48.83	
Turnout		177,938	77.93	
TRS gain from INC		Swing		

=== 2009 ===
2009 Andhra Pradesh Legislative Assembly election: Wardhanapet (SC)
Party	Candidate	Votes	%	±%
INC	Kondeti Sridhar	57,871	38.83	
TRS	Dr. Gunde Vijaya Rama Rao	51,287	34.41	
PRP	Jannu Jakharaiah	20,692	13.88	
BJP	Dubashi Vasudev	4,503	3.02	
LSP	Jetti Ravikumar	2,800	1.88	
Majority		6,584	4.42	
Turnout		149,048	69.35	
INC gain from TDP		Swing		

=== 2004 ===
2004 Andhra Pradesh Legislative Assembly election: Wardhannapet
Party	Candidate	Votes	%	±%
TDP	Errabelli Dayakar Rao	73,022	56.43	
JP	Muthireddy Yadagiri Reddy	47,928	37.03	
IND	Sambireddy Anumula	4,880	3.77	
Majority		25,094	19.39	
Turnout		129,415		
TDP hold		Swing		

=== 1999 ===
1999 Andhra Pradesh Legislative Assembly election: Wardhannapet
Party	Candidate	Votes	%	±%
TDP	Errabelli Dayakar Rao	62,581	53.30	
INC	Smt. Swarna Errabelli	50,998	43.43	
MCPI(S)	Gugulothu Nanu	1,822	1.55	
Majority		11,583	9.87	
Turnout		117,413	80.59	
TDP hold		Swing		

=== 1994 ===
1994 Andhra Pradesh Legislative Assembly election: Wardhannapet
Party	Candidate	Votes	%	±%
TDP	Errabelly Dayakar Rao	54,029	49.24	
INC	Errabelly Varada Rajeshwar Rao	31,854	29.03	
BJP	Takkallapally Rajeshwar Rao	19,672	17.93	
MCPI	Ghousе Mohammad	3,381	3.08	
Majority		22,175	20.21	
Turnout		109,716	79.06	
TDP gain from BJP		Swing		

=== 1989 ===
1989 Andhra Pradesh Legislative Assembly election: Wardhannapet
Party	Candidate	Votes	%	±%
BJP	Takkallapalli Rajeshwar Rao	39,118	43.71	
INC	Varada Rajeshwar Rao Yerrabelli	29,052	32.47	
IND	Jagannadham Macherla	10,432	11.66	
MCPI	Gousu Abdul	8,786	9.82	
Majority		10,066	11.24	
Turnout		89,485	74.85	
BJP hold		Swing		

=== 1985 ===
1985 Andhra Pradesh Legislative Assembly election: Wardhannapet
Party	Candidate	Votes	%	±%
BJP	Vannala Sreeramulu	39,097	52.59	
INC	Errabelli Varada Rajeshwar Rao	25,571	34.40	
IND	Lingala Venkat Narasimha Reddy	7,540	10.14	
IND	V. Sudhir Reddy	1,318	1.77	
Majority		13,526	18.19	
Turnout		74,342	70.09	
BJP gain from INC		Swing		

=== 1983 ===
1983 Andhra Pradesh Legislative Assembly election: Wardhannapet
Party	Candidate	Votes	%	±%
INC	Jagannadham Macherla	27,232	39.37	
BJP	Vannala Sreramulu	20,960	30.30	
IND	Yerrabelli Dayakar Rao	13,773	19.91	
CPI	Mohan Rao Nellutla	6,598	9.54	
Majority		6,272	9.07	
Turnout		69,175	75.24	
INC gain from JP		Swing		

=== 1978 ===
1978 Andhra Pradesh Legislative Assembly election: Wardhannapet
Party	Candidate	Votes	%	±%
JP	Jagannadham Macherla	24,113	37.08	
INC	Purushotham Rao Takkallapally	20,118	30.94	
INC(I)	Erra Komuriah	17,295	26.60	
IND	Kundour Lakshmi Narasimha Reddy	3,505	5.39	
Majority		3,995	6.14	
Turnout		65,031	77.32	
JP gain from INC		Swing		

== See also ==
- Warangal West (Assembly constituency)
- Warangal East (Assembly constituency)
- List of constituencies of Telangana Legislative Assembly
