= Panthini =

- village
- Location in Telangana, India Panthini (India)
- Coordinates: 17.84532°N 79.6039°E
- Country: India
- State: Telangana
- District: Hanamkonda

Population (2011)
  - Total: 4,165

Languages
- Time zone: UTC+5:30 (IST)

Panthini (Village code 578306) is a village in Inavole mandal, Hanamkonda district in the state of Telangana in India. It is located to the south of the city of Warangal, and north of the village of Wardhannapet, alongside Warangal-Khammam Road.
