= Ghanpur Station Assembly constituency =

Constituency of the Telangana legislative assembly in India

Coordinates: 17.85°N 79.37°E

Ghanpur (Station)
- Constituency No. 99 for the Telangana Legislative Assembly
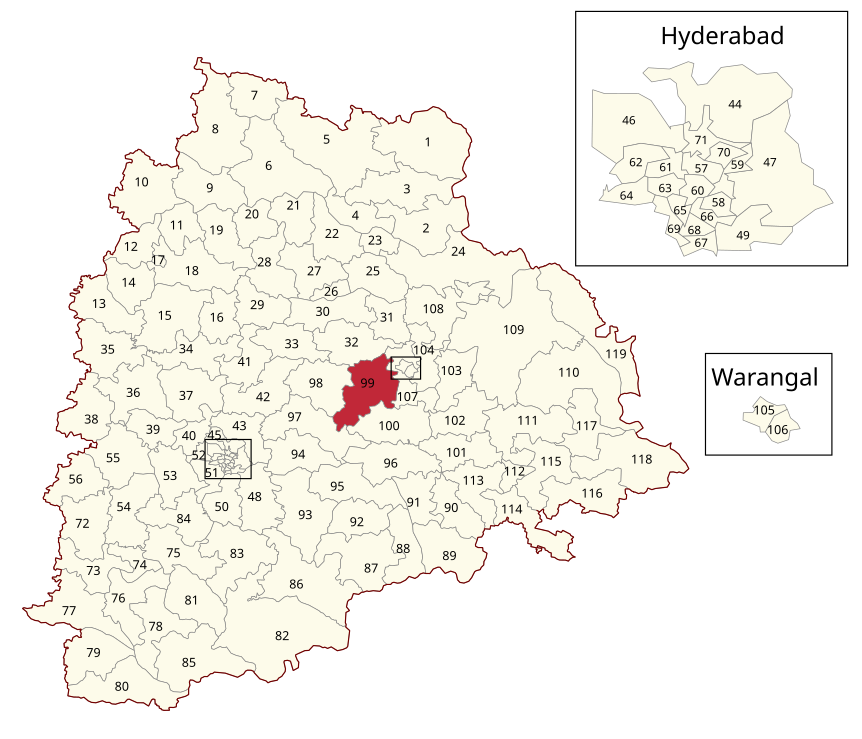
- Location of Ghanpur (Station) Assembly constituency within Telangana

Constituency details
- Country: India
- Region: South India
- State: Telangana
- District: Jangaon
- Lok Sabha constituency: Warangal
- Total electors: 2,17,756
- Reservation: SC

Member of Legislative Assembly
- 3rd Telangana Legislative Assembly
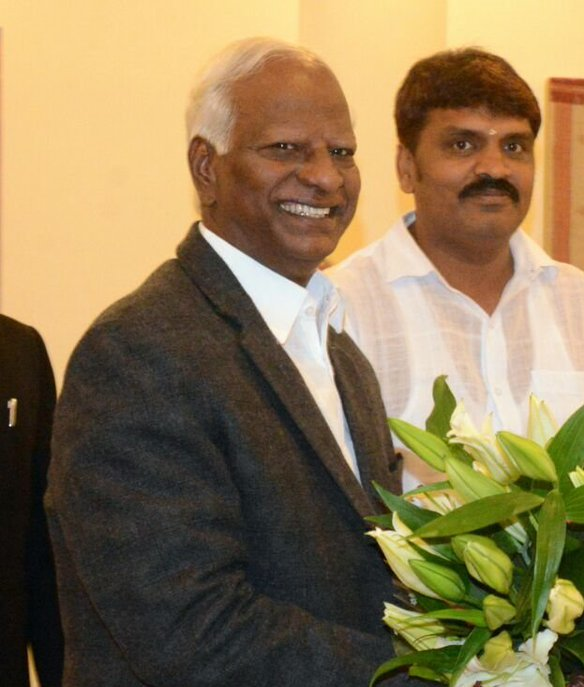
- Incumbent Kadiyam Srihari
- Party: Indian National Congress
- Elected year: 2023

Ghanpur (Station) Assembly constituency, also known as Station Ghanpur, is a scheduled caste reserved constituency of Telangana Legislative Assembly. It is one of the three constituencies in Jangaon district. It is part of Warangal Lok Sabha constituency.

Kadiyam Srihari, who served as the Deputy Chief Minister of Telangana, is representing this constituency since December 2023.

== Mandals ==
Mandal	Districts
Ghanpur (Station)	Jangaon
Raghunathpalle	Jangaon
Zaffergadh	Jangaon
Chilpur	Jangaon
Lingalaghanpur	Jangaon
Dharmasagar	Hanamkonda
Velair	Hanamkonda

== Members of Legislative Assembly ==
Duration	Member	Political party
1957	B. Keshav Reddy	Indian National Congress
1962	Nellutla Pushpasenam Vurap Mohan Rao	Communist Party of India
1967	T. L. Reddy	Independent politician
1972	T. Hayagriva Chary	Indian National Congress
1978	Goka Ramaswamy	Indian National Congress
1983	Goka Ramaswamy	Indian National Congress
1985	Bojappaly Rajaiah	Telugu Desam Party
1989	Bohnagiri Arogyam	Indian National Congress
1994	Kadiyam Srihari	Telugu Desam Party
1999	Kadiyam Srihari	Telugu Desam Party
2004	Gunde Vijaya Rama Rao	Telangana Rashtra Samithi
2008	Kadiyam Srihari	Telugu Desam Party
2009	T. Rajaiah	Indian National Congress
2012	T. Rajaiah	Telangana Rashtra Samithi
2014	T. Rajaiah	Telangana Rashtra Samithi
2018	T. Rajaiah	Telangana Rashtra Samithi
2023	Kadiyam Srihari	Bharat Rashtra Samithi

== Election results ==
=== 2023 ===
2023 Telangana Legislative Assembly election: Ghanpur (Station) (SC)
Party	Candidate	Votes	%	±%
BRS	Kadiyam Srihari	101,696	47.13	
INC	Indira Singapuram	93,917	43.53	
BJP	Gunde Vijaya Rama Rao	4,984	2.31	
IND	Baskula Nagaraju	2,466	1.14	
IND	Shaga Raju	2,417	1.12	
NOTA	None of the Above	1,153	0.53	
Majority		7,779	3.61	
Turnout		215,755	86.54	
BRS hold		Swing		

=== 2018 ===
2018 Telangana Legislative Assembly election: Ghanpur (Station) (SC)
Party	Candidate	Votes	%	±%
TRS	T. Rajaiah	98,612	49.57	
INC	Indira Singapuram	62,822	31.58	
BSP	Prathap Rajarapu	22,774	11.45	
IND	Madasi Venkatesham	4,890	2.46	
NOTA	None of the Above	3,540	1.78	
BJP	Perumandla Venkateshwarlu	2,370	1.19	
Majority		35,790	17.99	
Turnout		198,943	88.14	
TRS hold		Swing		

=== 2014 ===
2014 Telangana Legislative Assembly election: Ghanpur (Station) (SC)
Party	Candidate	Votes	%	±%
TRS	T. Rajaiah	103,662	57.83	
INC	Gunde Vijaya Rama Rao	44,833	25.01	
TDP	Dommati Sambaiah	20,430	11.40	
NOTA	None of the Above	3,224	1.80	
RPI(A)	Marapaka Ramesh	2,487	1.39	
YSRCP	Munigala William	1,155	0.64	
Majority		58,829	32.82	
Turnout		179,265	80.53	
TRS hold		Swing		

=== 2012 by-election ===
2012 Andhra Pradesh Legislative Assembly by-election : Station Ghanpur
Party	Candidate	Votes	%	±%
TRS	T. Rajaiah	81,279	47.84%	
TDP	Kadiyam Srihari	48,641	28.63%	
INC	Rajarapu Prathap	22,774	13.41%	
CPI(M)	Ilishan Daida	1,832	1.08%	
Majority		32,638	19.21%	{{{change}}}
Turnout		169,908		{{{change}}}

=== 2009 ===
2009 Andhra Pradesh Legislative Assembly election: Ghanpur (Station) (SC)
Party	Candidate	Votes	%	±%
INC	T. Rajaiah	68,162	39.71	
TDP	Kadiyam Srihari	56,952	33.18	
PRP	Aroori Ramesh	26,075	15.19	
PPOI	Kongara Anil Kumar	4,982	2.90	
CPI(M)	Ratnamala Naliganti	4,664	2.72	
IND	Perumandla Venkateshwarlu	3,587	2.09	
BSP	Chintha Suvartha	2,191	1.28	
BJP	Chiluka Vijaya Rao	1,910	1.11	
Majority		11,210	6.53	
Turnout		171,646		
INC gain from TRS		Swing		

=== 2008 (by-election) ===
2008 Andhra Pradesh Legislative by-election: Ghanpur (Station) (SC)
Party	Candidate	Votes	%	±%
TDP	Kadiyam Srihari	39,663	35.76	
INC	T. Rajaiah	35,545	32.05	
TRS	Gunde Vijaya Rama Rao	31,897	28.76	
IND	Laxminarayana Kotha	1,856	1.67	
IND	Gangarapu Raju	1,113	1.00	
IND	Perumanola Venkateshwarlu	820	0.73	
Majority		4,118	3.71	
Turnout		110,894		
TDP gain from TRS		Swing		

=== 2004 ===
2004 Andhra Pradesh Legislative Assembly election: Ghanpur (SC)
Party	Candidate	Votes	%	±%
TRS	Gunde Vijaya Rama Rao	63,221	55.78	
TDP	Kadiyam Srihari	43,501	38.38	
BSP	Dubasi Narsing	3,110	2.74	
IND	Kotte Rajaiah	1,897	1.67	
IND	T. Rajaiah	1,620	1.43	
Majority		19,720	17.40	
Turnout		113,349		
TRS gain from TDP		Swing		

=== 1999 ===
1999 Andhra Pradesh Legislative Assembly election: Ghanpur (SC)
Party	Candidate	Votes	%	±%
TDP	Kadiyam Srihari	50,080	50.12	
INC	T. Rajaiah	45,520	45.55	
CPI	Boddu Karunakar	2,726	2.73	
Majority		4,560	4.56	
Turnout		99,930	70.91	
TDP hold		Swing		

=== 1994 ===
1994 Andhra Pradesh Legislative Assembly election: Ghanpur (SC)
Party	Candidate	Votes	%	±%
TDP	Kadiyam Srihari	62,407	68.57	
INC	Arogyam B.	22,356	24.56	
BJP	Immadi Prabhaker	1,898	2.09	
Majority		40,051	44.01	
Turnout		91,008	68.72	
TDP hold		Swing		

== See also ==
- List of constituencies of Telangana Legislative Assembly
