= Sarve Satyanarayana =

Indian politician

Sarvey Sathyanarayana
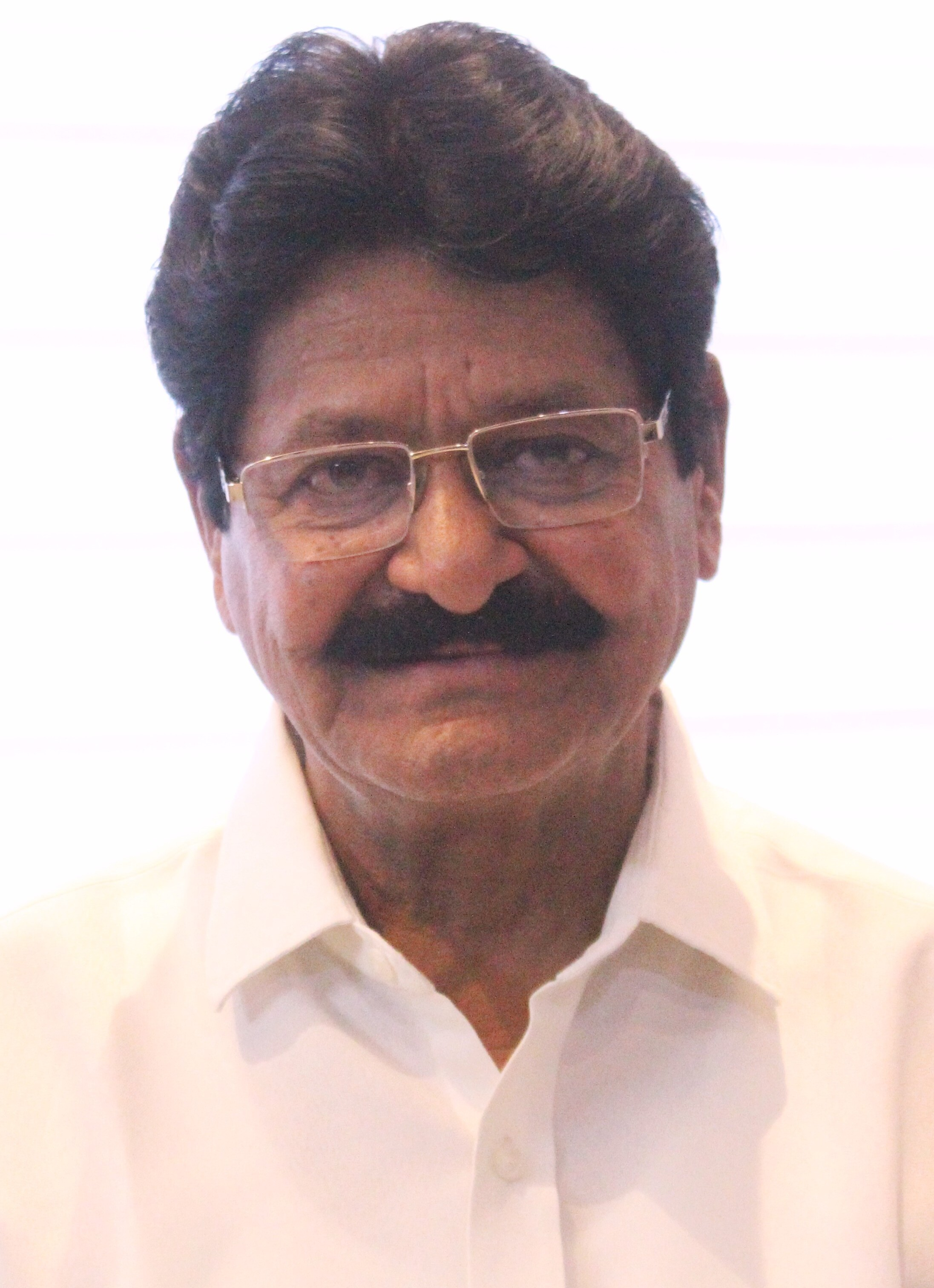

Member of Parliament Lok Sabha
- In office 2009–2014
- Constituency: Malkajgiri
- In office 2004–2009
- Constituency: Siddipet

Union Minister of State For Transport
- In office 2012–2014

Personal details
- Born: 4 April 1954 (age 72) Hyderabad, Telangana, India
- Party: Indian National Congress (1985-2020)
- Spouse: Sunita (m.22 June 1981)
- Children: 1 Son, 2 Daughters (Sangeetha, Suhasini)
- Parent(s): Sarve Laxmaiah, Sarve Mallamma
- Education: B.A, LL.B, LL.M. (Osmania University)
- Profession: Advocate politician social worker businessman

Sarvey Sathyanarayana (born 4 April 1954) is an Indian politician. He is a former member of the Parliament of India who represented Malkajgiri constituency between 2009 and 2014, and Siddipet constituency between 2004 and 2009. He was inducted into Manmohan Singh's cabinet as Union minister of state for Transport in October 2012 until 2014.

== Electoral history ==
Year	Constituency	Party	Votes	Opponent		Result	Margin
1985	Secunderabad Cantt	TDP	35,427	INC	B. Machender Rao	Won	6,906
1996	Siddipet	NTRTDP(LP)	45,941	INC	Nandi Yellaiah	Lost	-370,792
2004	Siddipet	INC	593,879	TDP	K. Lingaiah	Won	138,972
2009	Malkajgiri	INC	388,368	TDP	Bheemsen T.	Won	93,326
2014	Malkajgiri	INC	233,530	TDP	Ch. Malla Reddy	Lost	-289,826
2015 (By-election)	Warangal	INC	156,315	TRS	Pasunoori Dayakar	Lost	-459,088
2018	Secunderabad Cantt	INC	28,234	TRS	G. Sayanna	Lost	-37,563

== Early life ==
Sarve Satyanarayana was born in Hyderabad to Laxmaiah and Mallamma. He gained his B.A. and LL.B. from Osmania University. He was a student union leader.

=== Career ===
He rendered about 13 years of Govt. service in SBH Compilation from 1972 to 1977; HMT, Hyderabad, from 1972 to 1978; and SAIL, Hyderabad, 1978–1985. He was a trade union leader for about 10,000 employees in SAIL, spread over 42 branches all over the country.

== Political career ==
Sarve Satyanarayana was elected to Andhra Pradesh Legislative Assembly from 1985 to 1989, elected to the Lok Sabha from Siddipet (Lok Sabha Constituency) in 2004 and from Malkajgiri constituency in 2009.

=== Political career ===
He was the national spokesman of the Congress party. He is an Ex-Member of Parliament in the Lok Sabha.

He was appointed as MoS, Road Transport & Highways on 28 October 2012.

== Electoral History ==
=== Lok Sabha ===
Year	Constituency	Party	Votes	%	Opponent	Party	Votes	%	Result	Margin	%
1996	Siddipet	NTDP	45,941	5.09	Yellaiah Nandi	INC	4,16,733	46.13	Lost	-3,70,792	-41.04
2004	Siddipet	INC	5,93,879	53.03	Dr. K. Lingaiah	TDP	4,54,907	40.62	Won	+1,38,972	+12.41
2009	Malkajgiri	INC	3,88,368	32.21	Bheemsen T.	TDP	2,95,042	24.47	Won	+93,326	+7.74
2014	Malkajgiri	INC	2,33,530	14.37	Ch. Malla Reddy	TDP	5,23,356	32.21	Lost	-2,89,826	-17.84
