= Sadath Ali Khan =

Indian politician

Ambassador of India to Turkey
- In office March 1966 – February 1967

Ambassador of India to Iraq
- In office 1962–1965

Member of Parliament, Lok Sabha
- In office 1952–1957
- Constituency: Ibrahimpatnam
- In office 1957–1962
- Preceded by: Pendyal Raghava Rao
- Succeeded by: Bakar Ali Mirza
- Constituency: Warangal

Personal details
- Born: 16 September 1919 Hyderabad, India
- Party: Indian National Congress
- Spouse: Sakina Begum
- Education: University of Oxford

Sadath Ali Khan was an Indian political and member of first and second Lok Sabha. He represented Warangal parliamentary constituency from 1952 to 1962. A member of the Indian National Congress, he also served as a secretary to the government of India from 1953 to 57.

He later served as the Indian Ambassador to Iraq (1962-1965) and Turkey (1966-1967). He died during his tenure in Turkey.

== Biography ==
He was born to Nawab Zain Yar Jung and Begum Ruqqaiya on 16 September 1916 in Hyderabad, India. He studied at Nizam College, Hyderabad and later at Oxford University. As a writer and journalist, he wrote poems in Urdu and English, and translated some uncertain literary works of English into Urdu. He wrote his memoirs, Brief Thanksgiving, in 1959.

He was married to Sakina Begum, with whom he had a son, Shujaat, and a daughter, Suroor.
