= Rajaiah =

Rajaiah may refer to

- Sunnam Rajaiah - Indian politician
- T. Rajaiah - MLA
- Siricilla Rajaiah - Member of Parliament
