= Kadiyam Srihari =

Indian politician

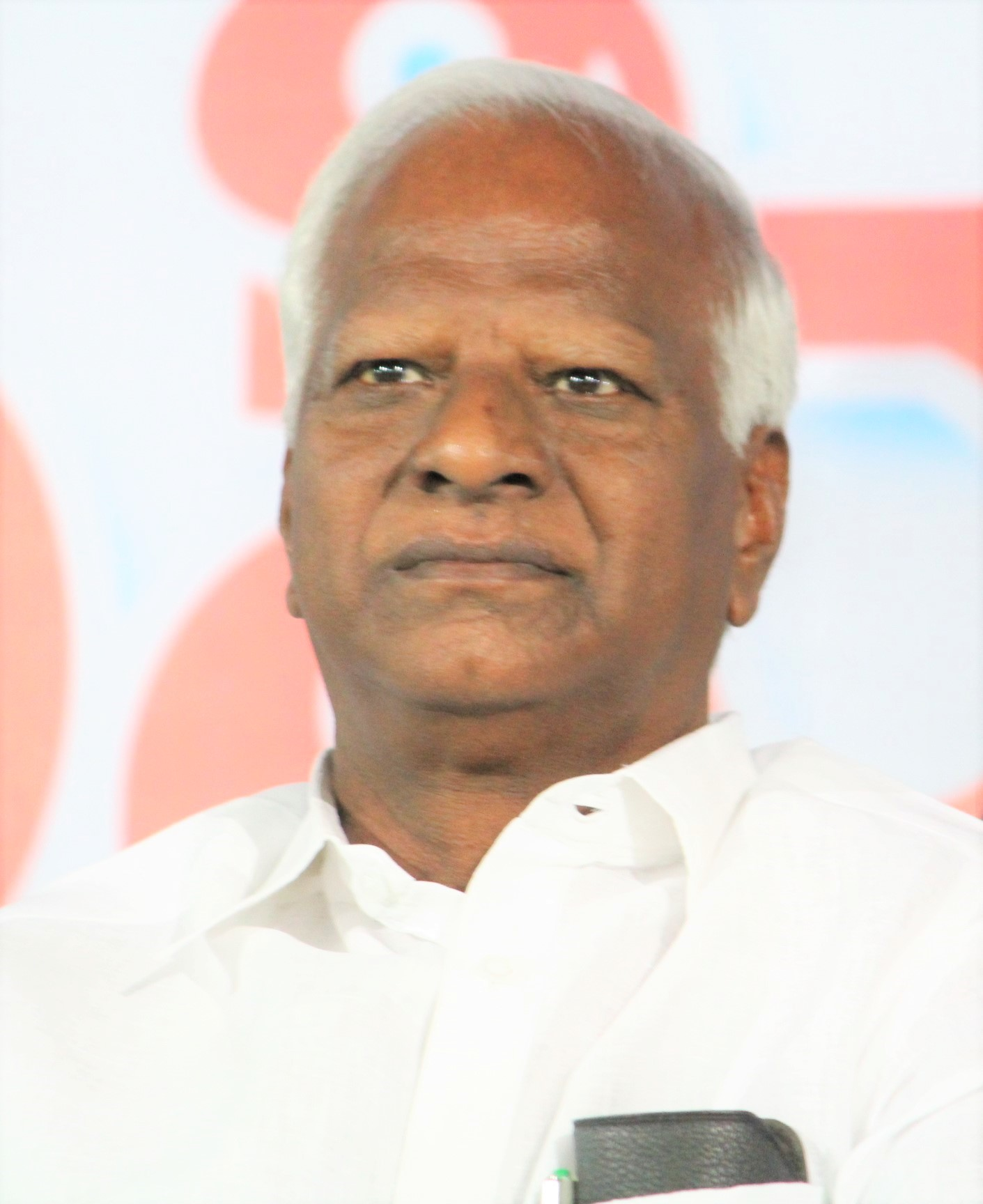
- Kadiyam in 2023

Member of Legislative Assembly, Telangana
- Incumbent
- Assumed office 2023
- Preceded by: T. Rajaiah
- Constituency: Station Ghanpur

Minister of Education Government of Telangana
- In office 25 January 2015 – 12 December 2018
- Governor: E. S. L. Narasimhan
- Chief Minister: K. Chandrashekar Rao
- Preceded by: Guntakandla Jagadish Reddy
- Succeeded by: Patlolla Sabitha Indra Reddy

3rd Deputy Chief Minister of Telangana
- In office 25 January 2015 – 12 December 2018
- Governor: E. S. L. Narasimhan
- Chief Minister: K. Chandrashekar Rao
- Preceded by: Thatikonda Rajaiah
- Succeeded by: Mallu Bhatti Vikramarka

Member of Legislative Council, Telangana
- In office 2015–2023
- Constituency: Elected by Members of the Legislative Assembly

Member of Parliament, Lok Sabha
- In office 2014–2015
- Preceded by: Siricilla Rajaiah
- Succeeded by: Pusunoori Dayakar
- Constituency: Warangal

Minister of Marketing, Social Welfare, Education and Irrigation Government of Andhra Pradesh
- In office 1 September 1995 – 13 May 2004
- Chief Minister: N. Chandrababu Naidu

Minister of Marketing and Warehousing Government of Andhra Pradesh
- In office 12 December 1994 – 1 September 1995
- Chief Minister: N. T. Rama Rao

Member of Legislative Assembly Andhra Pradesh
- In office 2008–2009
- Preceded by: Gunde Vijaya Rama Rao
- Succeeded by: T. Rajaiah
- Constituency: Ghanpur Station
- In office 1994–2004
- Preceded by: Bhonagiri Arogyam
- Succeeded by: Gunde Vijaya Rama Rao
- Constituency: Ghanpur Station

Personal details
- Born: 8 July 1952 (age 74) Parvathagiri, Warangal district, Hyderabad State, (present-day Telangana) India
- Party: Indian National Congress (since 2024)
- Other political affiliations: Bharat Rashtra Samithi (2013–2024); Telugu Desam Party (until 2013)
- Spouse: K. Vinaya Rani
- Children: 3 including Kadiyam Kavya

Kadiyam Srihari (born 8 July 1952) is an Indian politician is currently the MLA from the Ghanpur Station Assembly constituency. He also served as the Deputy Chief Minister of Telangana and Minister for Education of Telangana from 2014 to 2018. He was also an MLC in the Telangana Legislative Council. He was a member of the Lok Sabha, representing the Warangal constituency from 2014-2015.

In the 2023 Telangana Legislative Assembly elections, Kadiyam contested as a member of the BRS party, from the Ghanpur Station Assembly Constituency and won the seat. He later joined the Congress party on 31 March 2024.

== Personal life ==
Kadiyam Srihari was born in Parvathagiri, a village in the Warangal district. He attended Zilla Parishad High School in Warangal and, then was awarded a B.Sc. from the Arts and Science College in the same city. In 1975, he got a M.Sc. from Osmania University, Hyderabad.

He is married to K. Vinaya Rani, and has 3 daughters with her. One of his daughters, Kadiyam Kavya is a member of 18th Lok Sabha.

He was a manager for Syndicate Bank in Nizamabad, where he worked from 1975 until 1977. He then became a teacher, working as a junior lecturer between 1977 and 1987. During this period, he served as the District President for the Government Junior Lecturers Association in Warangal and also as the State Secretary for the same body in Andhra Pradesh.

== Political career ==
Kadiyam entered politics in February 1987 when he was asked by N. T. Rama Rao to join the Telugu Desam Party and contest for the position of mayor of Warangal Municipal Corporation. He served as chairman for the Kakatiya Urban Development Authority, Warangal in 1988. He was the district president for TDP in Warangal from 1987 to 1994.

Kadiyam won a seat as a MLA from Station Ghanpur constituency in 1994. He served as a minister in the cabinet of Nandamuri Taraka Rama Rao, handling at various times the portfolios of Marketing, Social Welfare, Education and Irrigation in the Cabinets of both Nandamuri Taraka Rama Rao and Nara Chandrababu Naidu.

In 2004, Kadiyam lost the general election contest in Station Ghanpur to TRS floor leader Dr. G. Vijayrama Rao of the Telangana Rashtra Samithi. He won a by-election from the same constituency in 2008.

He played a crucial role in getting the pro-Telangana letter from the TDP party and also represented TDP in an all-party meeting held in New Delhi.

Kadiyam announced his resignation from the TDP at Warangal on 11 May 2013, expressing displeasure over the party's ambivalent stand on the Telangana statehood issue. He formally joined the TRS, which supported statehood for the Telangana region, on 15 May 2013. He served as the Member of Parliament from Warangal Parliamentary Constituency and later took oath as a cabinet minister in Telangana government on 25 January 2015 as a deputy chief minister and education minister.

He is a politburo member in the TRS state committee and also chairman of training classes programmer for Telangana cadre. He is the chairman of TRS manifesto committee and played a crucial role in representing the aspirations of various sectors of people.

He was chosen as deputy chief minister and education minister of the state of Telangana on 25 January 2015. He served until 12 December 2018.

On 11 June 2015, he resigned as a Lok Sabha MP as he was elected as a member of the legislative council (MLC) and as a minister in Telangana government. He served in the position from 2015 until 2023.

In the 2023 Telangana Legislative Assembly elections, he defeated Indira Singapuram of INC by 7779 votes, to become the MLA for the Ghanpur (Station) Assembly Constituency. He switched parties and joined the Indian National Congress on 31 March 2024, in the presence of Chief Minister A Revanth Reddy and AICC in-charge Deepa Dasmunshi.

== Positions held ==
- Minister for Irrigation, United Andhra Pradesh
- Minister for Social Welfare, United Andhra Pradesh
- Minister for Education, Telangana and United Andhra Pradesh
- Minister for Marketing, United Andhra Pradesh (1995-2004)
- Deputy CM of Telangana

== Political statistics ==
	Year	Contested for	Party	Constituency	Opponent	Votes	Majority	Result
1	1994	MLA	TDP	Ghanpur (Station)	B.AROGYAM (INC)	62407 - 22356	40051	Won
2	1999	MLA	TDP	Ghanpur (Station)	Dr. T. Rajaiah (INC)	50080 - 45520	4560	Won
3	2004	MLA	TDP	Ghanpur (Station)	GUNDE VIJAYA RAMA RAO (TRS)	43501- 63221	-19720	Lost
4	2008 - ByPoll	MLA	TDP	Ghanpur (Station)	GUNDE VIJAYA RAMA RAO (TRS)			Won
5	2009	MLA	TDP	Ghanpur (Station)	Dr. T. Rajaiah (INC)	56952 - 68162	-11210	Lost
6	2012 - ByPoll	MLA	TDP	Ghanpur (Station)	Dr. T. Rajaiah (TRS)	81279 - 48641	-32638	Lost
7	2014	MP	TRS	Warangal	Rajaiah Siricilla (INC)	6,61,639 - 2,69,065	3,92,574	Won
8	2015	MLC	TRS	Assembly Constituency				Won
9	2023	MLA	TRS	Ghanpur (Station)	Singapuram Indira (INC)		7779	Won
