= Wardhannapet =

- town
- Location in Telangana, India Wardhannapet (India)
- Coordinates: 17°46′25″N 79°34′30″E
- Country: India
- State: Telangana
- District: Warangal district
- Named for: agriculture
- Talukas: Wardhannapet

Government
  - Type: Municipal Council
  - Body: Wardhannapeta Municipality

Population (2011)
  - Total: 13,715

Languages
  - Official: Telugu
- Time zone: UTC+5:30 (IST)
- PIN: 506313
- Vehicle registration: TS 03
- Lok Sabha constituency: Warangal Lok Sabha constituency
- Vidhan Sabha constituency: Waradhanapet Assembly constituency
- Website: telangana.gov.in

Wardhannapet is a census town and a municipality in Warangal district in the state of Telangana in India.
