= Kadiyam Kavya =

Indian politician

Member of Parliament, Lok Sabha
- Incumbent
- Assumed office 2024
- Preceded by: Pasunoori Dayakar
- Constituency: Warangal

Personal details
- Born: 10 April 1983 (age 43) Warangal
- Party: INC
- Other political affiliations: BRS
- Spouse: Dr. Md. Nazeerulla Shaik (m.26 August 2007)
- Children: 2 Daughters
- Parent(s): Kadiyam Srihari, Kadiyam Vinayarani
- Education: Osmania Medical College, Hyderabad

Kadiyam Kavya is an Indian politician and the elected candidate for Lok Sabha from Warangal Lok Sabha constituency. She is the daughter of senior politician Kadiyam Srihari

== Political career ==
Kavya was inspired by her father Kadiyam Srihari's political legacy and she was active in public life for years through her charitable organisation Kadiyam Foundation. The BRS had nominated Kavya to contest from Warangal Lok Sabha seat, replacing the sitting MP Pasunuri Dayakar in 2024 Lok Sabha polls. After announcing her candidature she has decided to withdraw from the contest. Kadiyam Kavya later joined the Congress party on March 31 in the presence of Chief Minister Revanth Reddy and AICC in-charge Deepa Dasmunshi.

The AICC's Central Election Committee (CEC) announced the candidature of Kadiyam Kavya on 1 April. In the 2024 general elections, Kavya of the Congress secured a decisive victory with 5,81,294 votes (45.85%), followed by Aroori Ramesh of the BJP with 3,60,955 votes (28.47%), and Dr. Marapally Sudheer Kumar of the Bharat Rashtra Samithi with 2,32,033 votes (18.3%). Kadiyam Kavya won Warangal Parliamentary (SC) seat with a huge majority of 2,20,339 by defeating her nearest rival BJP's Aroori Ramesh.

== See also ==
- 18th Lok Sabha
