= K. R. Nagaraj =

Indian politician

Member of the Telangana Legislative Assembly
- Incumbent
- Assumed office December 2023
- Preceded by: Aroori Ramesh

Personal details
- Party: Indian National Congress

K. R. Nagaraj (born 1963) is an Indian politician from Telangana state. He is an MLA from Waradhanapeta Assembly constituency which is reserved for SC community Warangal district. He represents Indian National Congress Party and won the 2023 Telangana Legislative Assembly election.

== Early life and education ==
Nagaraj is from Warangal. His father's name is K. Karpan. He completed his graduation in 1988 at a college in Hanumakonda, affiliated with Kakatiya University. He was an IPS officer and worked as Nizamabad Police Commissioner.

== Career ==
Nagaraj won the Waradhanapeta Assembly constituency representing Indian National Congress in the 2023 Telangana Legislative Assembly election. He polled 106,696 votes, and defeated his nearest rival Aroori Ramesh of Bharat Rashtra Samithi by a margin of 19,458 votes.
