= Aroori Ramesh =

Indian politician

Member of the Telangana Legislative Assembly
- In office 12 December 2018 – 3 December 2023
- Constituency: Wardhannapet

Member of the Telangana Legislative Assembly
- In office 2014 – 11 December 2018
- Constituency: Wardhannapet

Aroori Ramesh is an Indian politician who served as Member of the Telangana Legislative Assembly. He was elected for the first time in 2014 and again in the 2018 elections.

== Early life and education ==
He was born on 4 April 1967 in Uppugal to parents Aroori Gattumallu and Aroori Venkatamma. He graduated with MA and LLB degrees.

== Personal life ==
He is married to Aroori Kavitha Kumari.

In 2024, Aroori Ramesh resigned from Bharat Rashtra Samithi. He joined the Bharatiya Janata Party during the 2024 Lok Sabha elections. He rejoined the Bharat Rashtra Samithi on 28 January 2026.

=== Candidate of 2024 general Lok Sabha election ===
Aroori Ramesh was a candidate of Warangal Lok Sabha constituency in the 2024 Indian Lok Sabha elections.

=== Lok Sabha election result ===
He gained 360,955 votes and lost the election to Congress candidate Kadiyam Kavya.

== Tenure as Member of Legislative Assembly ==
He laid foundation stone for development projects in his Wardhannapet assembly constituency. He said that he would ensure development of the 43rd division of Greater Warangal Municipal Corporation.

== Electoral performance ==
Year	Party	Votes	Vote %	Result
2014	Telangana Rashtra Samithi	117,254	66.9	Won
2018	Telangana Rashtra Samithi	131,252	71.6	Won
2023	Bharat Rashtra Samithi	87,238	39.9	Lost
