= Pendyala Raghava Rao =

Indian politician

Member of Parliament
- In office 1952–1957
- Constituency: Warangal

Personal details
- Born: 15 March 1917 Chinna Pendyal, Warangal district
- Died: 10 September 1987 (aged 70)
- Party: Peoples Democratic Front (Hyderabad)
- Spouse(s): Venkatamma, later Kausalya devi
- Children: 2 sons from Venkatamma, 2 sons and 2 daughters from Kausalya devi

Pendyala Raghava Rao (15 March 1917 – 10 September 1987) was an Indian politician.

He was the son of Shri Pendyal Ramchander Rao and was born in Chinna Pendyal of the Warangal district in March 1917. He was educated at Warangal High School and married Shrimati Venkatamma in 1934. The couple had 2 sons. After the death of his wife, he married Shrimati Kausalya devi and had 2 sons and 2 daughters from this marriage.

He resisted the Conversion Movement in 1935–36, joined Congress Satyagraha in 1938, and was sentenced to imprisonment with fine of Rs. 300. He later joined Andhra Mahasabha and went underground in 1946 when it was banned. He resisted the Razakar movement and was a member of the Peoples Democratic Front, elected to the 1st Lok Sabha from Hyderabad constituency in 1952. He defeated the famous poet Kaloji Narayan Rao of Indian National Congress, by almost 4000 votes in this election.

His biography with his articles called "Naa Prajaa Jeevitham" was authored by his daughter, K. Neeharini. Raghava Rao died in September 1987 at the age of 70.

In 2026, Manu Nellutla, author of the Janya Bharata series, published The Forgotten Maverick, a biographical novel based on Raghava Rao's unfinished newspaper columns, his widow's memoir, and the recollections of his family and comrades. ISBN 979-8-162-61639-9.
