= Dharavath Ravinder Naik =

Indian politician

Ravinder Naik Dharavath
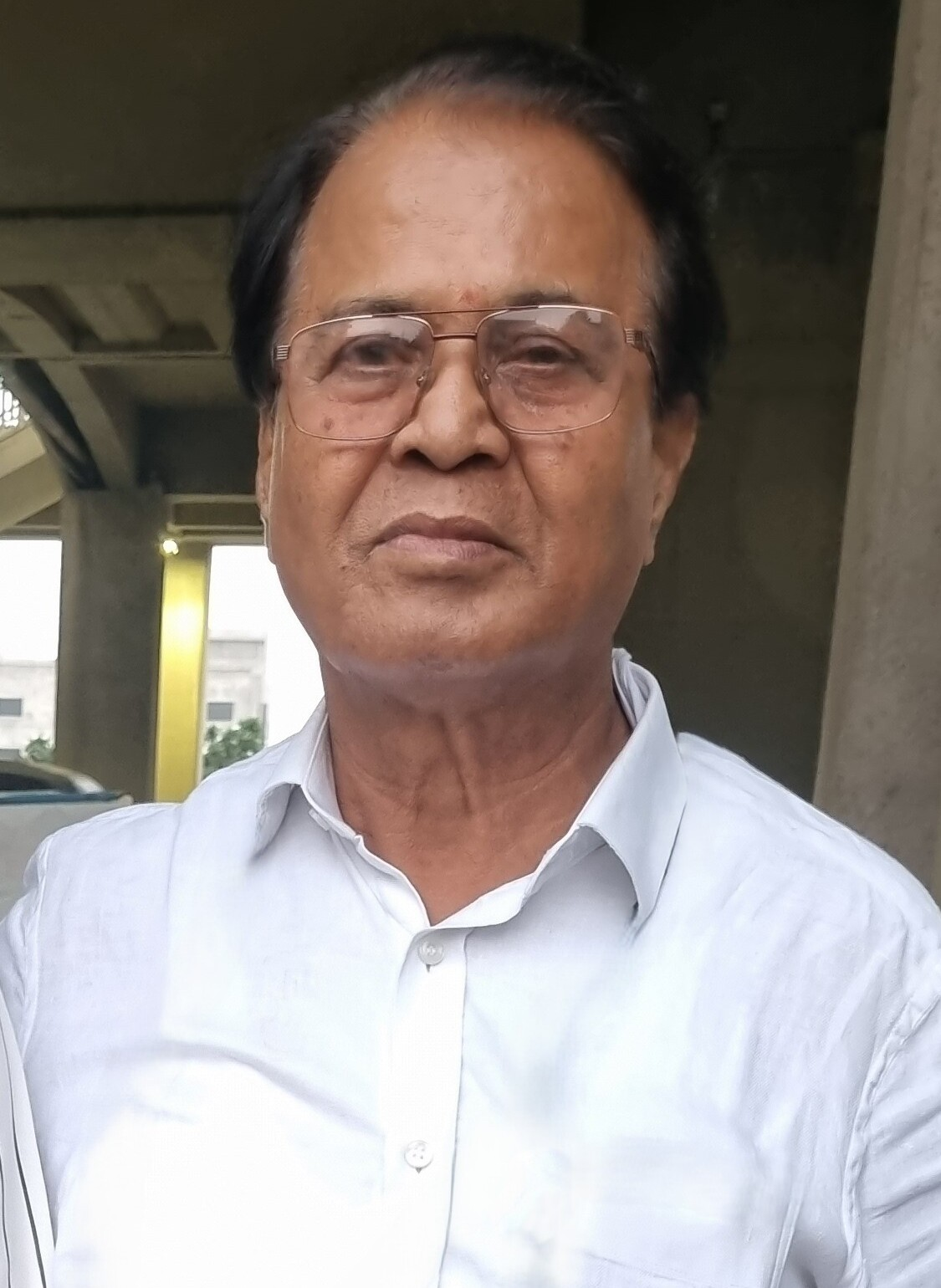

MP
- Constituency: Warangal

Personal details
- Born: 15 August 1952 (age 73) Warangal, Andhra Pradesh
- Party: Indian National Congress (2024-Present) (2013-2019) Bharatiya Janata Party (2019-2024) Telangana Rashtra Samithi (2004-2013)
- Spouse: Nanda Naik
- Children: 2 daughters
- As of 26 September, 2006

Ravinder Naik Dharavath (born 15 August 1952) is a member of the 14th Lok Sabha of India. He represents the Warangal constituency of Andhra Pradesh and was a member of the Bharatiya Janata Party (BJP) political party.

== Electoral History ==
=== Lok Sabha ===
| Year | Constituency | Party | Votes | % | Opponent | Party | Votes | % | Result | Margin | % |
|---|---|---|---|---|---|---|---|---|---|---|---|
| 1998 | Khammam | BJP | 117,926 | 13.07 | Nadendla Bhaskar Rao | INC | 363,747 | 40.30 | Lost | −245,821 | −27.23 |
| 2004 | Warangal | TRS | 427,601 | 46.38 | Bodakunti Venkateshwarlu | TDP | 408,339 | 44.29 | Won | +19,262 | +2.09 |
