= Siddipet Lok Sabha constituency =

Former constituency of the Indian parliament in Andhra Pradesh

Coordinates: 18.1°N 78.8°E

Siddipet
- Former Lok Sabha constituency

Constituency details
- Country: India
- Region: South India
- State: Andhra Pradesh
- Assembly constituencies: Secunderabad Cantt; Medchal; Siddipet; Dommat; Gajwel; Narsapur; Ramayampet
- Established: 1967
- Abolished: 2008
- Reservation: SC

Siddipet was one of the 42 Lok Sabha (parliamentary) constituencies in Andhra Pradesh till 2008.

== Members of Parliament ==
| Year | Winner | Party |
|---|---|---|
| 1967 | Gaddam Venkatswamy | Indian National Congress |
| 1971 | Gaddam Venkatswamy | Telangana Praja Samithi |
| 1977 | Nandi Yellaiah | Indian National Congress |
| 1980 | Nandi Yellaiah | Indian National Congress |
| 1984 | G. Vijaya Rama Rao | Telugu Desam Party |
| 1989 | Nandi Yellaiah | Indian National Congress |
| 1991 | Nandi Yellaiah | Indian National Congress |
| 1996 | Nandi Yellaiah | Indian National Congress |
| 1998 | Malyala Rajaiah | Telugu Desam Party |
| 1999 | Malyala Rajaiah | Telugu Desam Party |
| 2004 | Sarvey Sathyanarayana | Indian National Congress |
Constituency Demolished in 2008 after Delimitation Commission of India Report.

== Election results ==
=== 2004 ===
2004 Indian general elections: Siddipet
| Party | Candidate | Votes | % | ±% |
|---|---|---|---|---|
| INC | Sarvey Sathyanarayana | 593,879 | 53.03 | +11.82 |
| TDP | Dr K Lingaiah | 454,907 | 40.62 | −15.33 |
| BSP | Paladugu Gouramma | 31,949 | 2.85 | |
| Independent | B O V Rao | 25,069 | 2.24 | |
| Independent | Y Samaiah | 14,010 | 1.25 | +1.08 |
| Majority | | 138,978 | 12.41 | +27.15 |
| Turnout | | 1,119,814 | 64.84 | −1.46 |
| INC hold | | Swing | +11.82 | |

== See also ==
- Medak district
- List of constituencies of the Lok Sabha
