= Pasunuri Dayakar =

Indian politician

Pasunoori Dayakar

Member of Parliament, Lok Sabha
- In office 2015–2024
- Preceded by: Kadiyam Srihari
- Succeeded by: Kadiyam Kavya
- Constituency: Warangal

Personal details
- Born: 2 August 1967 (age 59) Bollikunta, Warangal
- Party: Indian National Congress
- Other political affiliations: Bharat Rashtra Samithi
- Spouse: Jayavani
- Children: 2

Pasunoori Dayakar( 2 August 1967) is an Indian Politician. He was elected to the Lok Sabha the lower house of Indian Parliament from Warangal constituency in Telangana in a bye election in 2015 as a member of the Bharat Rashtra Samithi.

The 2015 Loksabha bypoll for Warangal was necessitated following the resignation of Kadiyam Srihari after he was made Deputy Chief Minister. Pasunoori Dayakar who won the Warangal Lok Sabha seat by winning with a margin of 4,59,092 votes.
