= Siricilla Rajaiah =

Indian politician

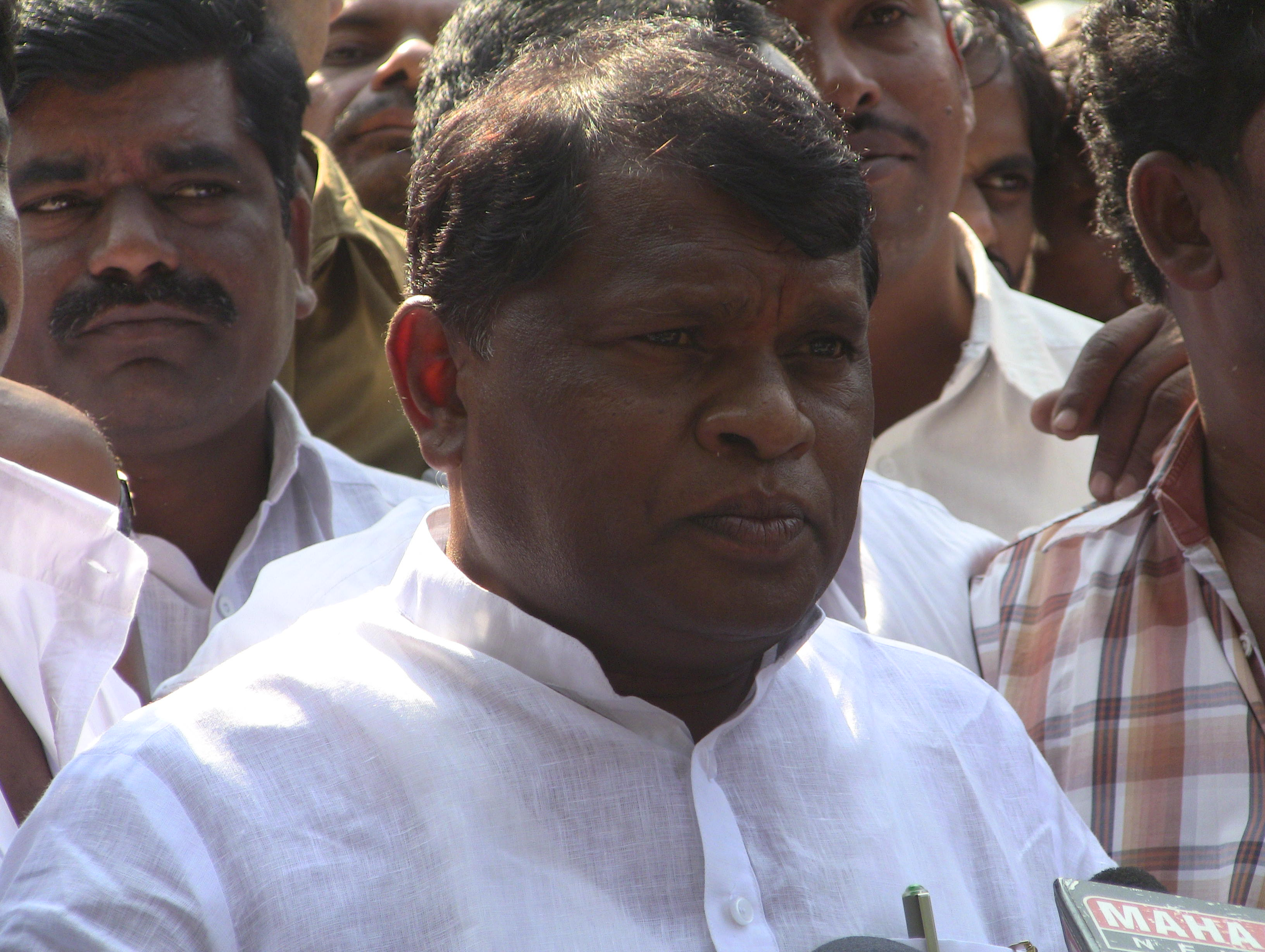

Telangana State Finance Commission Chairman
- In office 16 February 2024
- Preceded by: V. Bhoopal Reddy

Member of Parliament, Lok Sabha
- In office May 2009 - May 2014
- Succeeded by: Kadiyam Srihari

Personal details
- Born: 9 August 1954 (age 72)
- Party: Indian National Congress
- Spouse: Madhavi
- Children: Anil

Siricilla Rajaiah (born 9 Aug 1954) is an Indian politician and a former member of Lok Sabha, Lower House of the Parliament of India.

Siricilla Rajaiah has been appointed as the Chairman of the State Finance Commission for a period of two years on 16 February 2024.

== Early life ==
Rajaiah was born in Lingapur village Manakondur Mandal in Karimnagar district to Bakkaiah and Shanthamma. He did his B.Sc.(Agriculture) from N.G.Ranga Agricultural University.

== Career ==
Siricilla Rajaiah is an Indian National Congress party politician and represented Warangal parliamentary constituency during 2009–2014. He lost his MP seat in 2014 General elections to Kadiyam Srihari. After Kadiyam Srihari resigned, Sircilla Rajaiah was selected by the Congress to contest in the by-elections. Rajaiah did not contest after the death of his grand children and daughter in law.

== Personal life ==
Rajaiah is married to Madhavi. They have a son and a daughter.

== Controversies ==
Rajaiah's daughter-in-law and three grandchildren died in a suicidal fire accident in his residence. Rajaiah's son Anil had an extramarital affair which was supported by Rajaiah & his wife. As per the emails and letters revealed after the death of Sarika, it was confirmed that her husband and in-laws harassed her to the core which is widely believed to be the cause of the fire suicide. Congress party suspended Rajaiah immediately. As per the sources, Rajaiah & Sarika had a very big fight the night when the incident happened, which provoked Sarika to take this extreme step. Sarika had earlier filed a harassment case against her husband which was in pending. Rajaiah along with his wife and son were arrested by the police in connection with the case....

== Electoral History ==
=== Lok Sabha ===
Year	Constituency	Party	Votes	%	Opponent	Party	Votes	%	Result	Margin	%
2009	Warangal	INC	396,568	38.48	Ramagalla Parameshwar	TRS	271,907	26.39	Won	+124,661	+12.09
2014	Warangal	INC	269,065	22.87	Kadiyam Srihari	TRS	661,639	56.23	Lost	−392,574	−33.36
