= Warangal Lok Sabha constituency =

Lok Sabha Constituency in Telangana, India

Coordinates: 18.0°N 79.6°E

Warangal TG-15
- Lok Sabha constituency
- Boundary of Warangal Constituency in Telangana

Constituency details
- Country: India
- Region: South India
- State: Telangana
- Assembly constituencies: Ghanpur (Station); Palakurthi; Parkal; Warangal West; Warangal East; Waradhanapet; Bhupalpalle
- Established: 1952
- Total electors: 1,537,781
- Reservation: SC

Member of Parliament
- 18th Lok Sabha
- Incumbent Kadiyam Kavya
- Party: INC
- Elected year: 2024

Warangal Lok Sabha constituency is one of the 17 Lok Sabha (Lower House of the Parliament) constituencies in Telangana state in southern India. This constituency is reserved for the candidates belonging to the Scheduled castes

Kadiyam Kavya of Indian National Congress is currently representing the constituency for the first time.

== Overview ==
Since its inception in 1952 the seat was won by many political parties with Congress winning 8 times out of 16 whereas other outfits like Telangana Praja Samithi and the Telugu Desam Party have won it during different general elections.

Telangana Rashtra Samithi emerged victorious on three occasions including the 2015 Bye election where its candidate Pasunuri Dayakar registered the biggest victory margin compared to any leader in the history of the Telangana

== Assembly segments ==
Warangal Lok Sabha constituency comprises the following Legislative Assembly segments:

No	Name	District	Member	Party	Leading (in 2024)
99	Ghanpur Station (SC)	Jangaon	Kadiyam Srihari	BRS	INC
100	Palakurthi	Jangaon	Mamidala Yashaswini Reddy	INC	INC
104	Parkal	Hanmakonda	Revuri Prakash Reddy	INC	INC
105	Warangal West	Hanmakonda	Naini Rajender Reddy	INC	INC
106	Warangal East	Hanmakonda	Konda Surekha	INC	BJP
107	Waradhanapet (SC)	Warangal	K. R. Naga Raju	INC	INC
108	Bhupalpalle	Jayashankar Bhupalpally	Gandra Satyanarayana Rao	INC	INC

== Members of Parliament ==
Year	Member	Party
Hyderabad State
1952	Pendyal Raghava Rao	People's Democratic Front (Hyderabad)
Andhra Pradesh
1957	Sadath Ali Khan	Indian National Congress
1962	Bakar Ali Mirza	Indian National Congress
1967	Surendra Reddy	Indian National Congress
1971	S. B. Giri	Telangana Praja Samithi
1977	G. Mallikarjuna Rao	Indian National Congress
1980	Kamaluddin Ahmed	Indian National Congress
1984	T. Kalpana Devi	Telugu Desam Party
1989	Surendra Reddy	Indian National Congress
1991	Surendra Reddy	Indian National Congress
1996	Azmeera Chandulal	Telugu Desam Party
1998	Azmeera Chandulal	Telugu Desam Party
1999	Bodakunti Venkateshwarlu	Telugu Desam Party
2004	Dharavath Ravinder Naik	Telangana Rashtra Samithi
2008^	Errabelli Dayakararao	Telugu Desam Party
2009	Siricilla Rajaiah	Indian National Congress
Telangana
2014	Kadiyam Srihari	Telangana Rashtra Samithi
2015^	Pasunuri Dayakar	Telangana Rashtra Samithi
2019	Pasunuri Dayakar	Telangana Rashtra Samithi
2024	Kadiyam Kavya	Indian National Congress

^By-Poll

== Election results ==
=== 2024 ===
2024 Indian general election: Warangal (Note: Detailed Results at: https://results.eci.gov.in/PcResultGenJune2024/ConstituencywiseS2915.htm)
Party	Candidate	Votes	%	±%
INC	Kadiyam Kavya	581,294	45.85	
BJP	Aroori Ramesh	360,955	28.47	
BRS	M. Sudheer Kumar	232,033	18.30	
BSP	Kalpana Panja	9,327	0.74	
NOTA	None of the Above	8,380	0.66	
IND	27 Independent Candidates	40,787	3.22	
OTH	11 Other Party Candidates	35,170	2.77	
Majority		220,339	17.38	
Turnout		1,267,946	68.86	
INC gain from TRS		Swing		

=== General election, 2019 ===
2019 Indian general elections: Warangal
Party	Candidate	Votes	%	±%
TRS	Pasunoori Dayakar	612,498	57.69	−1.81
INC	Dommati Sambaiah	2,62,200	24.70	+9.59
BJP	Chintha Sambamurthy	83,777	7.89	−4.68
ANP	Bunga Jyothi Ramana	29,183	2.75	
NOTA	None of the Above	18,801	1.77	
Majority		3,50,298	32.99	
Turnout		10,61,672	63.70	2.59
TRS hold		Swing		

=== By-election, 2015 ===
Bye-election, 2015: Warangal
Party	Candidate	Votes	%	±%
TRS	Pasunoori Dayakar	6,15,403	59.50	+3.17
INC	Sarvey Sathyanarayana	1,56,315	15.11	−7.80
BJP	Pagidipati Devaiah	1,29,868	12.57	
SJP	Jajula Bhaskar	28,371	2.67	
YSRCP	Nalla Suryaprakash	23,352	2.26	
Majority		4,59,088	44.39	
Turnout		10,34,840	68.50	
TRS hold		Swing		

=== General election, 2014 ===
2014 Indian general elections: Warangal
Party	Candidate	Votes	%	±%
TRS	Kadiyam Srihari	661,639	56.33	
INC	Rajaiah Siricilla	2,69,065	22.91	
BJP	Parameshwar Ramagalla	1,87,139	15.93	
NOTA	None of the above	14,034	1.19	
Majority		3,92,574	33.42	
Turnout		11,76,653	76.52	+7.30
TRS gain from INC		Swing		

=== General election, 2009 ===
2009 Indian general elections: Warangal
Party	Candidate	Votes	%	±%
INC	Siricilla Rajaiah	396,568	38.48	
TRS	Ramagalla Parameshwar	2,71,907	26.39	
TDP	Dommati Sambaiah	1,35,697	13.17	
PRP	Dr Chandragiri Rajamouly	1,08,390	10.51	
Majority		1,24,661	12.10	
Turnout		10,30,525	69.32	
INC gain from TDP		Swing		

=== General election, 2004 ===
General Election, 2004: Warangal
Party	Candidate	Votes	%	±%
TRS	Dharavath Ravinder Naik	427,601	46.38	+46.38
TDP	Bodakunti Venkateshwarlu	408,339	44.29	−2.06
PPoI	Ravullapelli Kondal Rao	19,080	2.07	
Majority		19,262	2.09	+18.44
Turnout		921,872	75.90	+0.36
TRS gain from TDP		Swing	+46.38	

=== General election, 1999 ===
General Election, 1999: Warangal
Party	Candidate	Votes	%	±%
TDP	Bodakunti Venkateshwarlu	385,593	45.1	
INC	T. Kalpanadevi	3,72,227	43.5	
CPI(M)	Gollapelly Nagaiah	30,622	3.6	
Majority		13,366	1.6	
Turnout		8,55,702	75.5	
TDP hold		Swing		

=== General election, 1998 ===
General Election, 1998: Warangal
Party	Candidate	Votes	%	±%
TDP	Azmeera Chandulal	323,093	40.7	
INC	T. Kalpana Devi	2,98,292	37.6	
BJP	C.Janga Reddy	1,08,942	13.7	
Majority		24,801	3.1	
Turnout		7,93,614	70.4	
TDP hold		Swing		

=== General election, 1996 ===
General Election, 1996: Warangal
Party	Candidate	Votes	%	±%
TDP	Azmeera Chandulal	292,887	38.7	
INC	Surander Reddy Rama	2,75,447	36.4	
NTRTDP(LP)	M.A. Rawoof	68,257	9.0	
Majority		17,440	2.3	
Turnout		7,56,120	67.6	
TDP gain from INC		Swing		

=== 1991 ===
1991 Indian general election: Warangal
Party	Candidate	Votes	%	±%
INC	Surendra Reddy	258,733	44.92	
TDP	N. Yethiraja Rao	206,860	35.91	
BJP	Kola Janardhan	32,340	5.61	
MCPI(S)	Rajanna Soma	30,900	5.36	
IND	Buga Sreeramulu	24,536	4.26	
IND	Ramanna Goud	9,379	1.63	
IND	Daram Madan Mohan	5,516	0.96	
BSP	Azeez Abdul	3,199	0.56	
JP	Bhupal Goud	2,205	0.38	
IND	Sreepathi Komaraiah	1,533	0.27	
IND	Malothu Nanya	522	0.09	
IND	Mohd. Abdul Aleem	251	0.04	
Majority		51,873	9.01	
Turnout		594,774	62.86	
INC hold		Swing		

=== 1989 ===
1989 Indian general election: Warangal
Party	Candidate	Votes	%	±%
INC	Surender Reddy Ramasahayam	311,810	45.81	
TDP	Kalpana Devi Tourtreddy	257,689	37.86	
MCPI(S)	Rajanna Soma	71,861	10.56	
IND	Ramulu Burra	20,975	3.08	
IND	Nallani Swami Rao	9,786	1.44	
IND	Gogu Narsalah	8,497	1.25	
Majority		54,121	7.95	
Turnout		714,262	75.50	
INC gain from TDP		Swing		

=== 1984 ===
1984 Indian general election: Warangal
Party	Candidate	Votes	%	±%
TDP	T. Kalpana Devi	232,088	43.56	
INC	Kamaluddin Ahmed	223,632	41.98	
IND	S. V. K. Prasad	70,840	13.30	
IND	I. K. Moses	3,097	0.58	
IND	Banothu Rangebai	3,093	0.58	
Majority		8,456	1.58	
Turnout		547,314	73.69	
TDP gain from INC		Swing		

=== 1980 ===
1980 Indian general election: Warangal
Party	Candidate	Votes	%	±%
INC(I)	Md. Kamaloddin Ahmed	265,042	59.56	
INC(U)	T. Purshotham Rao	143,000	32.14	
IND	Gopagani Sankar Rao	21,402	4.81	
IND	Swamy T. S. Deve Anand	15,550	3.49	
Majority		122,042	27.42	
Turnout		460,588	69.89	
INC(I) gain from INC		Swing		

=== 1977 ===
1977 Indian general election: Warangal
Party	Candidate	Votes	%	±%
INC	S. B. Giri	251,211	65.49	
JP	Jangareddy Chandabatla	128,589	33.52	
IND	Prabhakar Rao	3,787	0.99	
Majority		122,622	31.97	
Turnout		396,277	68.18	
INC gain from TPS		Swing		

=== 1971 ===
1971 Indian general election: Warangal
Party	Candidate	Votes	%	±%
TPS	S. B. Giri	182,258	55.62	
INC	K. Sudarsana Reddy	88,618	27.04	
ABJS	Bhandaru Sadashiva Rao	33,139	10.11	
IND	Chaganti Shankar Rao	13,990	4.27	
IND	Thokala Lakshma Reddy	9,672	2.95	
Majority		93,640	28.58	
Turnout		337,683	60.99	
TPS gain from INC		Swing		

=== 1967 ===
1967 Indian general election: Warangal
Party	Candidate	Votes	%	±%
INC	R. S. Reddy	146,715	42.67	
ABJS	L. S. Raju	76,770	22.33	
IND	R. Y. Rao	61,937	18.01	
SWA	P. N. Balasubramanian	58,441	17.00	
Majority		69,945	20.34	
Turnout		361,830	69.21	
INC hold		Swing		

=== 1962 ===
1962 Indian general election: Warangal
Party	Candidate	Votes	%	±%
INC	Bakar Ali Mirza	113,308	46.54	
CPI	S. Ramanatham	112,572	46.24	
ABJS	L. S. Raju	17,566	7.22	
Majority		736	0.30	
Turnout		252,243	61.82	
INC hold		Swing		

=== 1957 ===
1957 Indian general election: Warangal
Party	Candidate	Votes	%	±%
INC	Sadath Ali Khan	107,249	53.75	
PDF	Pendyala Raghava Rao	92,294	46.25	
Majority		14,955	7.50	
Turnout		199,543	58.13	
INC gain from PDF		Swing		

=== 1952 ===
1951–52 Indian general election: Warangal
Party	Candidate	Votes	%	±%
PDF	Pendyala Raghava Rao	77,264	41.43	
INC	Kaloji Narayana Rao	73,651	39.49	
SOC	K. Somayajulee	35,591	19.08	
Majority		3,613	1.94	
Turnout		186,506	51.03	
PDF win (new seat)				

== Trivia ==
- Pasunuri Dayakar of Telangana Rashtra Samithi won with record margin of nearly 4.60 lakh votes in bypolls making it highest majority in the history of Telangana Lok Sabha elections.

== See also ==
- Warangal district
- List of constituencies of the Lok Sabha
