= Parvathagiri =

- village
- Location in Telangana, India Parvathagiri (India)
- Coordinates: 17°44′30″N 79°43′35″E
- Country: India
- State: Telangana
- District: Warangal district
- Talukas: Parvathagiri

Languages
  - Official: Telugu
- Time zone: UTC+5:30 (IST)
- Vehicle registration: TS
- Website: telangana.gov.in

Parvathagiri is a village and a mandal in Warangal district in the state of Telangana in India.

== Villages ==
- Annaram Sharif
- Burugamadla
- Chinta Nekkonda
- Choutapalle
- Enugal
- Gopanapalle
- Kalleda
- Konkapaka
- Parvathagiri
- Ravoor
- Rollakal
- Somaram
- Vadlakonda
- Narayanapuram
- Doulthnagar
