= List of Lok Sabha members from Andhra Pradesh =

The Lok Sabha (meaning "House of the People") is the lower house of the Parliament of India. Andhra Pradesh state elects five members and they are directly elected by the state electorates of Uttarakhand. Members are elected for five years with first-past-the-post voting. The number of seats, allocated to the state/union territory are determined by the population of the state/union territory.

== List ==
Keys: YSRCP (12) BJP (6) INC (123) TDP (69)

| No | Name | Party affiliation | Constituency | Terms | Designation |
|---|---|---|---|---|---|
| 1 | Mekapati Rajamohan Reddy | YSR Congress Party | Nellore | 5 | |
| 2 | Y. V. Subba Reddy | YSR Congress Party | Ongole | 1 | |
| 3 | Maddila Gurumoorthy | YSR Congress Party | Tirupathi | 1 | |
| 4 | Bezawada Ramachandra Reddy | Independent | Nellore | 1 | |
| 5 | Y. Eswara Reddy | Communist Party of India | Kadapa | 4 | |
| 6 | T. N. Viswanatha Reddy | Indian National Congress | Rajampet | 2 | |
| 7 | V. V. Giri | Indian National Congress | Pathapatnam | 1 | President of India, Central Minister, State Minister & Governor |
| 8 | Boddepalli Rajagopala Rao | Indian National Congress | Srikakulam | 6 | |
| 9 | Kandala Subramaniam | Socialist Party (India) | Vizianagaram | 1 | |
| 10 | N Rama Seshiah | Independent | Parvathipuram | 1 | |
| 11 | Lanka Sundaram | Independent | Vishakhapatnam | 1 | |
| 12 | Gam Malludora | Independent | Vishakhapatnam | 1 | |
| 13 | Chelikani Venkat Rama Rao | Communist Party of India | Kakinada | 1 | |
| 14 | Kaneti Mohana Rao | Communist Party of India | Rajahmundry | 1 | |
| 15 | Nalla Reddi Naidu | Socialist Party (India) | Rajahmundry | 1 | |
| 16 | Kondru Subba Rao | Communist Party of India | Eluru | 1 | |
| 17 | Bayya Suryanarayana Murthy | Indian National Congress | Amalapuram | 4 | |
| 18 | Sanka Butehikottaiah | Communist Party of India | Eluru | 1 | |
| 19 | K Gopala Rao | Communist Party of India | Gudivada | 1 | |
| 20 | Harindranath Chatopadhyaya | Independent | Vijayawada | 1 | |
| 21 | Kotha Raghuramaiah | Indian National Congress | Guntur | 6 | Central Minister |
| 22 | S V Laxmi Narsimhan | Independent | Guntur | 1 | |
| 23 | Chapalamadugu Ramiah Chowdhary | Independent | Narasaraopet | 1 | |
| 24 | M Nanadass | Independent | Ongole | 1 | |
| 25 | P Venkataraghaviah | Independent | Ongole | 1 | |
| 26 | Rayasam Seshagiri Rao | Independent | Nandyala | 1 | |
| 27 | Paidi Lakshmayya | Indian National Congress | Nandyala | 1 | |
| 28 | K S Raghavachari | Kisan Mazdoor Praja Party | Penukonda | 1 | |
| 29 | M V Gangadhara Siva | Indian National Congress | Chittoor | 2 | |
| 30 | M. A. Ayyangar | Indian National Congress | Tirupathi | 3 | Loksabha Speaker and Governor |
| 31 | T. Nagi Reddy | Communist Party of India | Ananthapur | 1 | Leader of Opposition in AP Assembly |
| 32 | Vutukuru Rami Reddy | Indian National Congress | Kadapa | 1 | |
| 33 | Kumari Mothey Vedakumari | Indian National Congress | Eluru | 1 | |
| 34 | D. Balarama Krishnaiah | Indian National Congress | Gudivada | 1 | |
| 35 | K.V. Ramakrishna Reddy | Indian National Congress | Hindupur | 2 | |
| 36 | Bayya Suryanarayana Murthy | Indian National Congress | Kakinada | 3 | Central Minister |
| 37 | Mosalikanti Thirumala Rao | Indian National Congress | Kakinada | 3 | Central Minister |
| 38 | C.Bali Reddy | Indian National Congress | Markapur | 1 | |
| 39 | Mandali Venkata Krishna Rao | Indian National Congress | Machalipatnam | 1 | State Minister |
| 40 | Pendekanti Venkatasubbaiah | Indian National Congress | Nandyala | 5 | Central Minister |
| 41 | B. Anjanappa | Indian National Congress | Nellore | 1 | |
| 42 | Ronda Narappa Reddy | Indian National Congress | Nellore | 1 | |
| 43 | Dippala Suri Dora | Socialist Party | Parvathipuram | 1 | |
| 44 | Dr. Dalta Satyanarayana Raju | Indian National Congress | Rajahmundry | 3 | |
| 45 | Komarraju Atchamamba | Indian National Congress | Vijayawada | 1 | |
| 46 | N. G. Ranga | Indian National Congress | Guntur | 4 | |
| 47 | Pusapati Vijayarama Gajapati Raju | Indian National Congress | Bobbili | 4 | |
| 48 | Kanuri Lakshmana Rao | Indian National Congress | Vijayawada | 3 | Central Minister |
| 49 | C. Dass | Indian National Congress | Tirupathi | 2 | |
| 50 | Kolla Venkaiah | Communist Party of India | Tenali | 1 | |
| 51 | C.L. Narasimha Reddy | Swatantra Party | Rajampet | 1 | |
| 52 | Mandala Venkata Swamy | Independent | Ongole | 1 | |
| 53 | Gujjulu Yallamanda Reddy | Communist Party of India | Markapur | 1 | |
| 54 | P. V. Narasimha Rao | Indian National Congress | Nandyal | 1 | Prime Minister & Chief Minister |
| 55 | Bezawada Gopala Reddy | Indian National Congress | Kavali | 1 | Central Minister, Chief Minister of AP & Governor |
| 56 | Viramachaneni Vimla Devi | Communist Party of India | Eluru | 1 | |
| 57 | Ravu Venkata Gopala Krishna Ranga Rao | Indian National Congress | Cheepurupalli | 1 | |
| 58 | Osman Ali S. Khan | Indian National Congress | Ananthapur | 1 | |
| 59 | Missula Suryanarayana Murti | Indian National Congress | Anakapalli | 2 | |
| 60 | Ponnapati Antony Reddy | Indian National Congress | Anantapur | 2 | |
| 61 | K. Narayana Rao | Indian National Congress | Bobbili | 2 | |
| 62 | N.P.C. Naidu | Indian National Congress | Chittoor | 1 | |
| 63 | Kommareddi Suryanarayana | Indian National Congress | Eluru | 3 | |
| 64 | Neelam Sanjiva Reddy | Janata Party | Nandyala | 2 | President of India, Loksabha Speaker, Central Minister & Chief Minister |
| 65 | R. Dasaratharama Reddy | Indian National Congress | Kavali | 1 | |
| 66 | Y. Gadilingana Goud | Swatantra Party | Kurnool | 2 | |
| 67 | Y. Ankeenidu Prasad | Indian National Congress | Machilipatnam | 1 | |
| 68 | Dalta Balarama Raju | Indian National Congress | Narasapur | 1 | |
| 69 | Maddi Sudarsanam | Indian National Congress | Narasaraopet | 2 | |
| 70 | B. Anjanappa | Indian National Congress | Nellore | 1 | |
| 71 | K. Jaggaiah | Indian National Congress | Ongole | 1 | |
| 72 | Viswasarai Narasimha Rao | Swatantra Party | Parvathipuram | 1 | |
| 73 | Pothuraju Parthasarthy | Indian National Congress | Rajampet | 4 | |
| 74 | Gouthu Latchanna | Swatantra Party | Srikakulam | 1 | Leader of Opposition in AP Assembly |
| 75 | Tenneti Viswanatham | Progressive Group | Visakhapatnam | 1 | State Minister |
| 76 | SRAS Appala Naidu | Indian National Congress | Anakapalli | 3 | State Minister |
| 77 | P. Ankineedu Prasada Rao | Indian National Congress | Bapatla | 3 | Central Minister & State Minister |
| 78 | P. Narasimha Reddy | Indian National Congress | Chittoor | 1 | |
| 79 | Pamudurthi Bayapa Reddy | Indian National Congress | Hindupur | 3 | |
| 80 | M.S. Sanjeevi Rao | Indian National Congress | Kakinada | 3 | |
| 81 | K. Kodanda Rami Reddy | Indian National Congress | Kurnool | 1 | |
| 82 | Maganti Ankineedu | Indian National Congress | Machilipatnam | 5 | |
| 83 | M.T. Raju | Indian National Congress | Narsapur | 1 | |
| 84 | Doddavarapu Kamakshaiah | Indian National Congress | Nellore | 3 | |
| 85 | Puli Venkata Reddy | Indian National Congress | Ongole | 3 | |
| 86 | Biddika Satanarayana | Indian National Congress | Parvathipuram | 1 | |
| 87 | S.B.P. Pattabhi Rama Rao | Indian National Congress | Rajahmundry | 3 | |
| 88 | Meduri Nageswara Rao | Indian National Congress | Tenali | 3 | |
| 89 | Thamburu Balakrishniah | Indian National Congress | Tirupathi | 2 | |
| 90 | Kusuma Krishna Murthy | Indian National Congress | Amalapuram | 3 | |
| 91 | Darur Pullaiah | Indian National Congress | Anantapur | 2 | |
| 92 | V. Kishore Chandra Deo | Indian National Congress | Araku | 5 | Central Minister |
| 93 | P. Rajagopal Naidu | Indian National Congress | Chittoor | 2 | |
| 94 | Kandala Obul Reddy | Indian National Congress | Kadapa | 2 | |
| 95 | Kotla Vijaya Bhaskara Reddy | Indian National Congress | kurnool | 6 | Central Minister & Chief Minister of AP |
| 96 | Alluri Subhash Chandra Bose | Indian National Congress | Narsapur | 2 | |
| 97 | K. Brahmananda Reddy | Indian National Congress | Narasaraopet | 2 | Central Minister, Chief Minister & Governor |
| 98 | Godey Murahari | Indian National Congress | Vijayawada | 1 | |
| 99 | Dronamraju Satyanarayana | Indian National Congress | Visakhapatnam | 1 | |
| 100 | Subbarao Chowdary Chitturi | Indian National Congress | Eluru | 1 | |
| 101 | Pasala Penchalaiah | Indian National Congress | Tirupathi | 1 | |
| 102 | Vidya Chennupati | Indian National Congress | Vijayawada | 2 | |
| 103 | Appalaswamy Kommuru | Indian National Congress | Visakhapatnam | 1 | |
| 104 | Aithabathula J. Venkata Butchi Maheshwara Rao | Telugu Desam Party | Amalapuram | 1 | |
| 105 | P. Appalanarasimham | Telugu Desam Party | Anakapalli | 1 | |
| 106 | D. Narayanaswami | Telugu Desam Party | Anantapur | 1 | |
| 107 | Chimata Sambu | Telugu Desam Party | Bapatla | 1 | |
| 108 | Poosapati Ananda Gajapathi Raju | Indian National Congress | Bobbili | 2 | State Minister |
| 109 | N.P. Jhansi Lakshmi | Telugu Desam Party | Chittoor | 1 | |
| 110 | Dr. D.N. Reddy | Telugu Desam Party | Kadapa | 1 | |
| 111 | Bolla Bulli Ramaiah | Telugu Desam Party | Eluru | 3 | Central Minister |
| 112 | K. Ramachandra Reddy | Telugu Desam Party | Hindupur | 1 | |
| 113 | Gopal Krishna Thota | Telugu Desam Party | Kakinada | 2 | |
| 114 | E. Ayyapu Reddy | Telugu Desam Party | Kurnool | 1 | |
| 115 | M. Subba Reddy | Telugu Desam Party | Nandyala | 1 | |
| 116 | Bhupathiraju Vijayakumar Raju | Telugu Desam Party | Narsapuram | 3 | |
| 117 | Katuri Narayana Swamy | Telugu Desam Party | Narasaraopet | 1 | |
| 118 | Puchalapalli Penchalaiah | Indian National Congress | Nellore | 2 | |
| 119 | Bezawada Papi Reddy | Telugu Desam Party | Ongole | 1 | |
| 120 | Sri Hari Rao Chundru | Telugu Desam Party | Rajahmundry | 1 | |
| 121 | Palakondrayudu Sugavasi | Telugu Desam Party | Rajampet | 1 | |
| 122 | H.A. Dora | Telugu Desam Party | Srikakulam | 1 | |
| 123 | Chinta Mohan | Indian National Congress | Tirupati | 6 | |
| 124 | Vadde Sobhanadreeswara Rao | Telugu Desam Party | Vijayawada | 2 | State Minister |
| 125 | Srirama Murthy Bhattam | Telugu Desam Party | Visakhapatnam | 1 | |
| 126 | Rama Krishna Konathala | Indian National Congress | Anakapalli | 2 | State Minister |
| 127 | Anantha Venkata Reddy | Indian National Congress | Anantapur | 2 | |
| 128 | Salagala Benjamin | Indian National Congress | Bapatla | 1 | |
| 129 | Kemburi Ramamohan Rao | Telugu Desam Party | Bobbili | 1 | |
| 130 | M. Gnanendra Reddy | Indian National Congress | Chittoor | 2 | |
| 131 | Dr. Y. S. Rajasekhara Reddy | Indian National Congress | Kadapa | 4 | Chief Minister |
| 132 | Ghattamaneni Krishna | Indian National Congress | Eluru | 1 | |
| 133 | S. Gangadhar | Indian National Congress | Hindupur | 3 | |
| 134 | M. M. Pallam Raju | Indian National Congress | Kakinada | 3 | Central Minister |
| 135 | Bojja Venkata Reddy | Indian National Congress | Nandyal | 1 | |
| 136 | Kesineni Srinivas | Telugu Desam Party | Vijayawada | 2 | |
| 137 | M.V.V.S. Murthi | Telugu Desam Party | Visakhapatnam | 2 | |
| 138 | Kasu Venkata Krishna Reddy | Indian National Congress | Narasaraopet | 2 | State Minister |
| 139 | Vijayarama Raju Satrucharla | Telugu Desam Party | Parvathipuram | 3 | State Minister |
| 140 | Juluri Jamuna | Indian National Congress | Rajahmundry | 1 | |
| 141 | Sai Prathap Annayyagari | Indian National Congress | Rajampet | 6 | Central Minister |
| 142 | Dr. Kanithi Viswanatham | Indian National Congress | Srikakulam | 2 | |
| 143 | Basavapunnaiah Singam | Indian National Congress | Tenali | 1 | |
| 144 | Uma Gajapathi Raju | Indian National Congress | Visakhapatnam | 1 | Central Minister |
| 145 | Ganti Mohana Chandra Balayogi | Telugu Desam Party | Amalapuram | 3 | Loksabha Speaker |
| 146 | Venkateswara Daggubati Rao | Telugu Desam Party | Bapatla | 1 | |
| 147 | Lal Jan Basha S.M. | Telugu Desam Party | Guntur | 1 | |
| 148 | Thota Subbarao | Telugu Desam Party | Kakinada | 1 | |
| 149 | Kotla Jaya Surya Prakash Reddy | Indian National Congress | Kurnool | 3 | Central Minister |
| 150 | K.P. Reddaiah Yadav | Telugu Desam Party | Machilipatnam | 1 | |
| 151 | Gangula Prathap Reddy | Indian National Congress | Nandyal | 1 | |
| 152 | Kumari Padmashree Kudumula | Indian National Congress | Nellore | 1 | |
| 153 | Magunta Subbarama Reddy | Indian National Congress | Ongole | 1 | |
| 154 | K.V.R. Choudhary | Telugu Desam Party | Rajahmundry | 1 | |
| 155 | Ummareddy Venkateswarlu | Telugu Desam Party | Tenali | 2 | Central Minister |
| 156 | Venkata Krishnam Raju Uppalapati | Bharatiya Janata Party | Narasapur | 2 | Central Minister |
| 157 | K. S. R. Murthy | Indian National Congress | Amalapuram | 1 | |
| 158 | Ayyanna Patrudu Chintakayala | Telugu Desam Party | Anakapalli | 1 | State Minister |
| 159 | Panabaka Lakshmi | Indian National Congress | Nellore | 4 | Central Minister |
| 160 | Kondapalli Pydithalli Naidu | Telugu Desam Party | Bobbili | 3 | |
| 161 | Nootanakalava Ramakrishna Reddy | Telugu Desam Party | Chittoor | 3 | State Minister |
| 162 | S. Ramachandra Reddy | Telugu Desam Party | Hindupur | 1 | State Minister |
| 163 | Satyanarayana Kaikala | Telugu Desam Party | Machilipatnam | 1 | |
| 164 | Bhuma Nagi Reddy | Telugu Desam Party | Nandyal | 3 | |
| 165 | Kothapalli Subbarayudu | Telugu Desam Party | Narasapur | 1 | State Minister |
| 166 | Kota Saidiah | Telugu Desam Party | Narasaraopet | 1 | |
| 167 | Magunta Parvathamma Subbarama Reddy | Indian National Congress | Ongole | 1 | |
| 168 | Pradeep Kumar Dev Vyricherla | Indian National Congress | Parvathipuram | 1 | |
| 169 | Ravindra Chitturi | Indian National Congress | Rajahmundry | 1 | |
| 170 | Kinjarapu Yerran Naidu | Indian National Congress | Srikakulam | 4 | Central Minister |
| 171 | Sarada Tadiparthi | Telugu Desam Party | Tenali | 1 | |
| 172 | Nelavala Subrahmanyam | Indian National Congress | Tirupathi | 1 | |
| 173 | Parvathaneni Upendra | Indian National Congress | Vijayawada | 2 | Central Minister |
| 174 | Dr. T. Subbarami Reddy | Indian National Congress | Visakhapatnam | 2 | Central Minister |
| 175 | Gudivada Gurunadha Rao | Indian National Congress | Anakapalli | 1 | State Minister |
| 176 | Maganti Venkateswara Rao | Telugu Desam Party | Eluru | 2 | State Minister |
| 177 | Rayapati Sambasiva Rao | Indian National Congress | Guntur | 5 | |
| 178 | Kavuru Samba Siva Rao | Indian National Congress | Eluru | 5 | Central Minister |
| 179 | Konijeti Rosaiah | Indian National Congress | Narasaraopet | 1 | Chief Minister & Governor |
| 180 | Bapi Raju Kanumuri | Indian National Congress | Narsapuram | 2 | |
| 181 | Magunta Sreenivasulu Reddy | YSR Congress Party | Ongole | 4 | |
| 182 | Girajala Venkata Swamy Naidu | Bharatiya Janata Party | Rajahmundry | 1 | |
| 183 | P. Shiv Shankar | Indian National Congress | Tenali | 1 | Central Minister & Governor |
| 184 | Dadichiluka Veera Gouri Sankara Rao | Telugu Desam Party | Parvathipuram | 1 | |
| 185 | Nedurumalli Janardhana Reddy | Indian National Congress | Visakhapatnam | 3 | Central Minister & Chief Minister |
| 186 | Botsa Satyanarayana | Indian National Congress | Bobbili | 1 | State Minister |
| 187 | Ganta Srinivasa Rao | Telugu Desam Party | Anakapalli | 1 | State Minister |
| 188 | Mudragada Padmanabham | Telugu Desam Party | Kakinada | 1 | State Minister |
| 189 | SBPBK Satyanarayana Rao | Bharatiya Janata Party | Rajahmundry | 1 | Central Minister |
| 190 | Vijaya Kumari Ganti | Telugu Desam Party | Amalapuram | 1 | |
| 191 | Ambati Brahmanaiah | Telugu Desam Party | Machilipatnam | 1 | |
| 192 | Gadde Ramamohan | Telugu Desam Party | Vijayawada | 1 | |
| 193 | Yemparala Venkateswara Rao | Telugu Desam Party | Guntur | 1 | |
| 194 | Daggubati Ramanaidu | Telugu Desam Party | Bapatla | 1 | |
| 195 | Karanam Balarama Krishna Murthy | Telugu Desam Party | Ongole | 1 | |
| 196 | Vukkala Rajeswaramma | Telugu Desam Party | Nellore | 1 | |
| 197 | Nandipaku Venkataswam | Bharatiya Janata Party | Tirupathi | 1 | |
| 198 | Gunipati Ramaiah | Telugu Desam Party | Rajampet | 1 | |
| 199 | Y. S. Vivekananda Reddy | Indian National Congress | Kadapa | 2 | State Minister |
| 200 | B K Parthasarathi | Telugu Desam Party | Hindupur | 1 | |
| 201 | Kalava Srinivasulu | Telugu Desam Party | Anantapur | 1 | State Minister |
| 202 | K. E. Krishnamurthy | Telugu Desam Party | Kurnool | 1 | State Minister |
| 203 | Botsa Jhansi Lakshmi | Indian National Congress | Bobbili | 2 | |
| 204 | Pappala Chalapathirao | Telugu Desam Party | Anakapalli | 1 | |
| 205 | Aruna Kumar Vundavalli | Indian National Congress | Rajahmundry | 2 | |
| 206 | G.V. Harsha Kumar | Indian National Congress | Amalapuram | 2 | |
| 207 | Chegondi Venkata Harirama Jogaiah | Indian National Congress | Narasapur | 1 | State Minister |
| 208 | Ramakrishna Badiga | Indian National Congress | Machilipatnam | 1 | |
| 209 | Rajagopal Lagadapati | Indian National Congress | Vijayawada | 2 | |
| 210 | Daggubati Purandareswari | Indian National Congress | Vizak | 2 | Central Minister |
| 211 | Balashowry Vallabhaneni | YSR Congress Party | Machilipatnam | 2 | |
| 212 | D.K. Audikesavulu | Telugu Desam Party | Chittoor | 1 | |
| 213 | G Nizamuddin | Indian National Congress | Hindupur | 1 | |
| 214 | S. P. Y. Reddy | YSR Congress Party | Nandyal | 3 | |
| 215 | Killi Krupa Rani | Indian National Congress | Srikakulam | 1 | Central Minister |
| 216 | Sabbam Hari | Indian National Congress | Anakapalli | 1 | |
| 217 | Konakalla Narayana Rao | Telugu Desam Party | Machilipatnam | 2 | |
| 218 | Modugula Venugopala Reddy | Telugu Desam Party | Narsaraopeta | 1 | |
| 219 | Kristappa Nimmala | Telugu Desam Party | Hindupur | 2 | State Minister |
| 220 | Y. S. Jagan Mohan Reddy | YSR Congress Party | Kadapa | 2 | Chief Minister |
| 221 | Naramalli Sivaprasad | Telugu Desam Party | Chittoor | 2 | State Minister |
| 222 | Kothapalli Geetha | YSR Congress Party | Araku | 1 | |
| 223 | Ram Mohan Naidu Kinjarapu | Telugu Desam Party | Srikakulam | 2 | |
| 224 | Pusapati Ashok Gajapathi Raju | Telugu Desam Party | Vizianagaram | 1 | Central Minister |
| 225 | Kambhampati Hari Babu | Bharatiya Janata Party | Visakhapatnam | 1 | Governor |
| 226 | Muttamsetti Srinivasa Rao | Telugu Desam Party | Anakapalli | 1 | State Minister |
| 227 | Thota Narasimham | Telugu Desam Party | Kakinda | 1 | State Minister |
| 228 | Pandula Ravindra Babu | Telugu Desam Party | Amalapuram | 1 | |
| 229 | Murali Mohan Maganti | Telugu Desam Party | Rajahmundry | 1 | |
| 230 | Gokaraju Ganga Raju | Bharatiya Janata Party | Narasapuram | 1 | |
| 231 | Galla Jayadev | Telugu Desam Party | Guntur | 2 | |
| 232 | Malyadri Sriram | Telugu Desam Party | Bapatla | 1 | |
| 233 | Butta Renuka | YSR Congress Party | Kurnool | 1 | |
| 234 | J. C. Diwakar Reddy | Telugu Desam Party | Anantapur | 1 | State Minister |
| 235 | Y. S. Avinash Reddy | YSR Congress Party | Kadapa | 2 | |
| 236 | Varaprasad Rao Velagapalli | YSR Congress Party | Tirupati | 1 | |
| 237 | P. V. Midhun Reddy | YSR Congress Party | Rajampet | 2 | |
| 238 | Balli Durga Prasad Rao | YSR Congress Party | Tirupati | 1 | State Minister |
| 239 | Yashoda Reddy | Indian National Congress | Kurnool | 1 | |
| 240 | Paidi Lakshmayya | Indian National Congress | Anantapur | 1 | |
| 241 | Anantha Venkatarami Reddy | Indian National Congress | Anantapur | 4 | |

== See also ==
List of Lok Sabha members from West Bengal
