= Department of Backward Classes Welfare (Andhra Pradesh) =

Head of the Ministry of Backward Classes Welfare of the Government of Andhra Pradesh

Minister of Backward Classes Welfare
- Venukabaḍina Taragatula Saṅkṣēma Śākha Mantrī
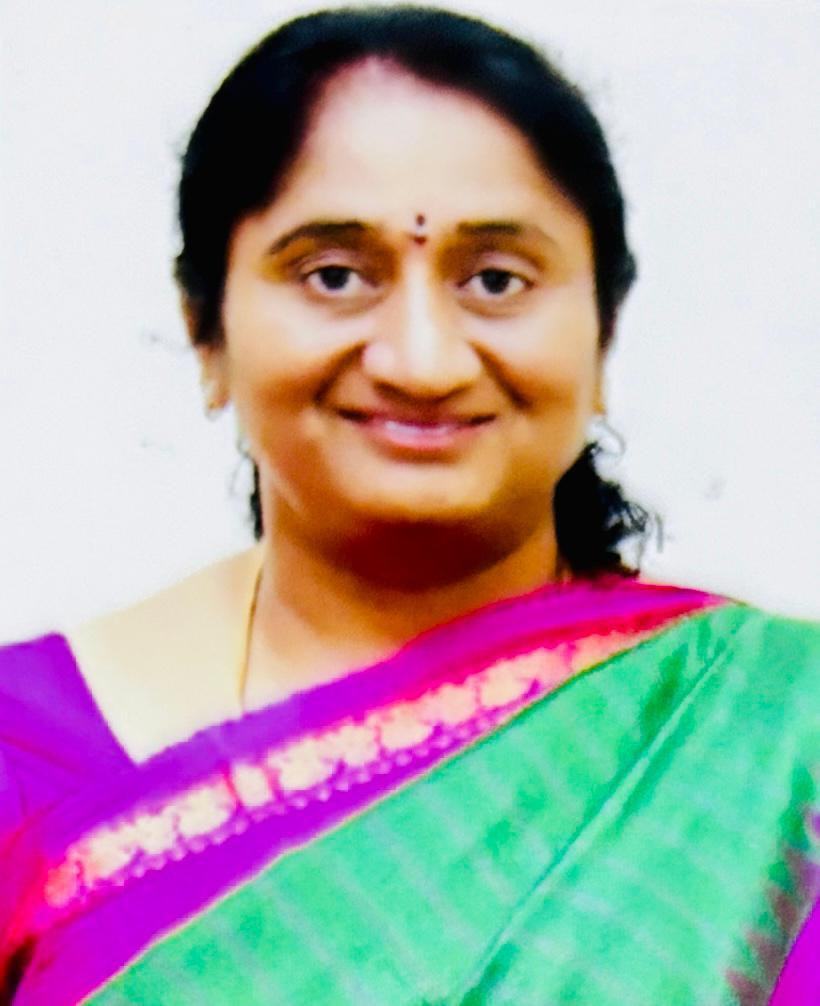
- Incumbent; S. Savitha since 12 June 2024
- Department of Backward Classes Welfare
- Member of: Andha Pradesh Cabinet
- Reports to: Governor of Andhra Pradesh; Chief Minister of Andhra Pradesh; Andhra Pradesh Legislature
- Appointer: Governor of Andhra Pradesh on the advice of the chief minister of Andhra Pradesh
- Inaugural holder: Kollu Ravindra
- Formation: 8 June 2014
- Website: Official website

The Minister of Backward Classes Welfare, is the head of the Department of Backward Classes Welfare of the Government of Andhra Pradesh.

The incumbent minister of the Backward Classes Welfare department is the S. Savitha from Telugu Desam Party.

== List of ministers ==
#	Portrait	Minister (Lifespan) Constituency	Term of office			Election (Term)	Party	Ministry	Chief Minister	Ref.
#	Portrait	Minister (Lifespan) Constituency	Term start	Term end	Duration	Election (Term)	Party	Ministry	Chief Minister	Ref.
1		Kollu Ravindra (born 1973); MLA for Machilipatnam	8 June 2014	1 April 2017	2 years, 297 days	2014 (14th)	Telugu Desam Party	Naidu III	N. Chandrababu Naidu	
2		Kinjarapu Atchannaidu (born 1969); MLA for Tekkali	2 April 2017	29 May 2019	2 years, 57 days	2014 (14th)	Telugu Desam Party	Naidu III	N. Chandrababu Naidu	
3		Malagundla Sankaranarayana (born 1965); MLA for Penukonda	30 May 2019	22 July 2020	1 year, 53 days	2019 (15th)	YSR Congress Party	Jagan	Y. S. Jagan Mohan Reddy	
4		Chelluboyina Srinivasa Venugopalakrishna (born 1962); MLA for Ramachandrapuram	23 July 2020	11 June 2024	3 years, 324 days	2019 (15th)	YSR Congress Party	Jagan	Y. S. Jagan Mohan Reddy	
5		S. Savitha (born 1977); MLA for Penukonda	12 June 2024	Incumbent	2 years, 87 days	2024 (16th)	Telugu Desam Party	Naidu IV	N. Chandrababu Naidu	
