= List of Kurubas =

Kuruba is a Hindu caste native to the Indian states of Karnataka, Andhra Pradesh, Telangana and Tamil Nadu. This is a list of notable Kurubas.

== Saints ==
- Kanaka Dasa (1509 – 1609), poet, philosopher, musician and composer from modern Karnataka.
- Balumama (1892–1966), Indian guru, religious leader.
- Basavaraja Devaru, Indian guru, the head of the Dharwad-based Mansur Sri Revana Siddeshwara Mutt.
- Beerendra Keshava Tarakananda Puri, first pontiff of the Kaginele Kanaka Guru Peetha, the cultural and spiritual centre of Kuruba Gowdas of Karnataka.
- Perumizhalai Kurumba Nayanar, 22nd of 63 Tamil Nayanmar saints.

== Warriors ==
- Harihara I (1336-1356) and Bukka Raya I (1356-1377), founders of the Vijayanagara Empire.
- Dridhaprahara (860-880), founder of the Seuna (Yadava) dynasty that ruled Maharashtra. It is the foundational dynasty of modern day Maharashtra and first major kingdom to use Marathi as a state language.
- Ramachandra of Devagiri (1271-1311), king of the Seuna (Yadava) dynasty.
- Sangolli Rayanna, 18th-century freedom fighter and a warrior who fought the British East India Company in South India.
- Kaka Nayaka, a legendary leader after whom the Kakanakote forest is named.
- Ahilya Bai Holkar

== Politics ==
- Adagur H. Vishwanath, former minister in the Government of Karnataka, former Member of Parliament (MP) from Karnataka and current member of Karnataka Legislative Council.
- Bandaru Dattatreya, Governor of the State of Haryana. He was the Member of Parliament Lok Sabha from Secunderabad between 1991-2004 and 2014-2019. He was a former minister in the Government of India under multiple administrations.
- Bandeppa Kashempur, former minister in the Government of Karnataka.
- B. K. Parthasarathi, Member of Parliament from Andhra Pradesh.
- Channaiah Odeyar former Member of Parliament, Davanagere district.
- C. S. Shivalli, former minister in the Government of Karnataka.
- D. K. Naikar, former Karnataka Pradesh Congress Committee President (1995-1996), was a Member of Parliament from Dharwad North constituency in Karnataka. He was elected to the 7th, 8th, 9th and 10th Lok Sabha.
- H. M. Revanna, former minister in the Government of Karnataka and current member of Karnataka Legislative Council.
- Kollur Mallappa, first President of Hyderabad Pradesh Congress Committee, prior to the merger of Hyderabad State into Andhra Pradesh. He was Member of Parliament from Raichur, Karnataka and Rajya Sabha MP for 3 terms. He was mentor of late Indian Prime Minister P. V. Narasimha Rao.
- K. S. Eshwarappa, former minister in the Government of Karnataka, former Deputy Chief Minister of Karnataka and former Leader of the Opposition in the Karnataka Legislative Council.
- Kuruva Gorantla Madhav, former Member of Parliament from Andhra Pradesh.
- Malagundla SankaraNarayana, former Minister for Roads & Buildings in Andhra Pradesh.
- M. D. Nataraj, former member of Karnataka Legislative Council and the son-in-law of Devaraj Urs.
- Siddaramaiah, Chief Minister of Karnataka.
- V. L. Patil, former minister in the Government of Karnataka, industrialist and a freedom fighter.

== Film actors ==
- Kalathapasvi Rajesh
- Karibasavaiah
- Duniya Vijay
- Aishwarya Arjun

== Others ==
- Belli Lalitha, Indian folk singer and founder of Telangana Kala Samithi.
- Kancha Ilaiah, Indian political theorist, writer and activist.
