= Hindupur Lok Sabha constituency =

Lok Sabha Constituency in Andhra Pradesh

Coordinates: 13.83°N 77.49°E

Hindupuram
- Lok Sabha constituency
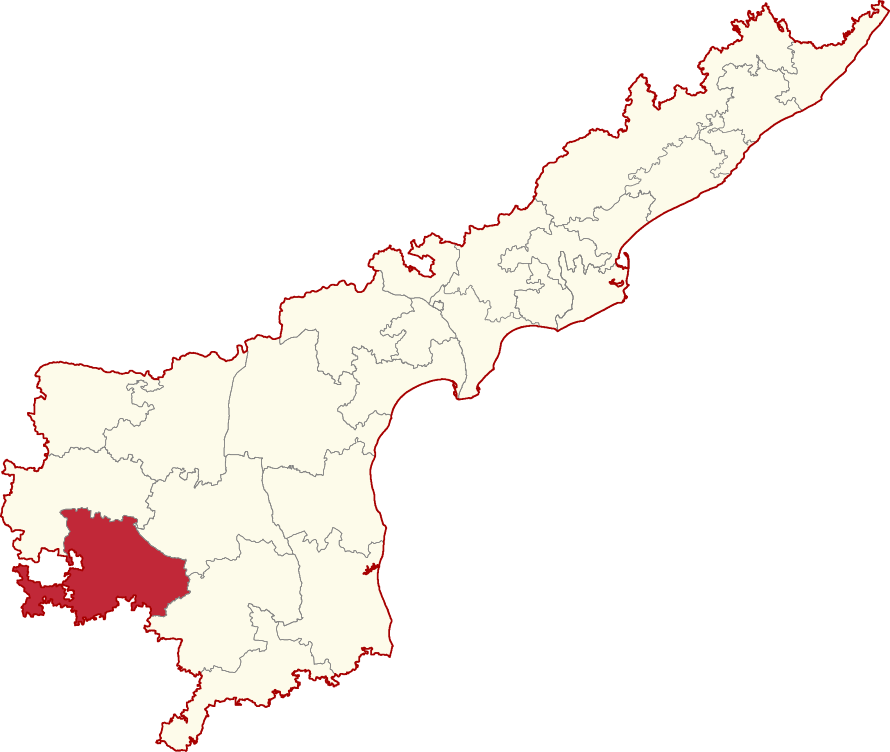
- Interactive Map Outlining Hindupur Lok Sabha constituency

Constituency details
- Country: India
- Region: South India
- State: Andhra Pradesh
- Assembly constituencies: Raptadu; Madakasira; Hindupur; Penukonda; Puttaparthi; Dharmavaram; Kadiri
- Established: 1957
- Total electors: 14,46,496
- Reservation: None

Member of Parliament
- 18th Lok Sabha
- Incumbent B. K. Parthasarathi
- Party: TDP
- Alliance: NDA
- Elected year: 2024
- Preceded by: Kuruva Gorantla Madhav

Hindupur Lok Sabha constituency is one of the twenty-five lok sabha constituencies of Andhra Pradesh in India. It comprises seven assembly segments and belongs to Sri Sathya Sai district and Anantapur district.

== Assembly segments ==
Hindupur constituency presently comprises the following Legislative Assembly segments:

#	Name	District	Member	Party	Leading (in 2024)
155	Raptadu	Anantapur	Paritala Sunitha	TDP	TDP
156	Madakasira (SC)	Sri Sathya Sai	M. S. Raju	TDP	TDP
157	Hindupuram	Sri Sathya Sai	Nandamuri Balakrishna	TDP	TDP
158	Penukonda	Sri Sathya Sai	S. Savitha	TDP	TDP
159	Puttaparthi	Sri Sathya Sai	Palle Sindhura Reddy	TDP	TDP
160	Dharmavaram	Sri Sathya Sai	Satya Kumar Yadav	BJP	TDP
161	Kadiri	Sri Sathya Sai	Kandikunta Venkata Prasad	TDP	TDP

== Members of Parliament ==
Year	Member	Party
1957	K. V. Ramakrishna Reddy	Indian National Congress
1962	K. V. Ramakrishna Reddy	Indian National Congress
1967	Neelam Sanjiva Reddy	Indian National Congress
1971	P. Bayapa Reddy	Indian National Congress
1977	P. Bayapa Reddy	Indian National Congress
1980	P. Bayapa Reddy	Indian National Congress (I)
1984	K. Ramachandra Reddy	Telugu Desam Party
1989	S. Gangadhar	Indian National Congress
1991	S. Gangadhar	Indian National Congress
1996	S. Ramachandra Reddy	Telugu Desam Party
1998	S. Gangadhar	Indian National Congress
1999	B. K. Parthasarathi	Telugu Desam Party
2004	G. Nizamuddin	Indian National Congress
2009	Kristappa Nimmala	Telugu Desam Party
2014	Kristappa Nimmala	Telugu Desam Party
2019	Kuruva Gorantla Madhav	YSR Congress Party
2024	B. K. Parthasarathi	Telugu Desam Party

== Election results ==
=== 1989 ===
1989 Indian general election: Hindupur
Party	Candidate	Votes	%	±%
INC	S. Gangadhara	327,512	50.17	+15.11
TDP	G. Ramanna Chowdary	325,344	49.83	−13.31
Majority		2,168	0.34	
Turnout		652,856	66.28	−3.70
INC gain from TDP		Swing		

=== 1991 ===
1991 Indian general election: Hindupur
Party	Candidate	Votes	%	±%
INC	S. Gangadhara	317,078	53.14	+2.97
TDP	S. Ramachandra Reddy	217,965	36.53	−13.30
Majority		99,113	16.61	
Turnout		596,710	60.53	−5.75
INC hold		Swing		

=== 1996 ===
1996 Indian general election: Hindupur
Party	Candidate	Votes	%	±%
TDP	S. Ramachandra Reddy	353,880	51.10	+14.57
INC	S. Gangadhar	181,458	26.20	−26.94
NTRTDP(LP)	G. Nagireddy	112,316	16.22	
Majority		172,422	24.90	
Turnout		692,591	59.11	−1.42
TDP gain from INC		Swing		

=== 1998 ===
1998 Indian general election: Hindupur
Party	Candidate	Votes	%	±%
INC	S. Gangadhara	284,096	43.16	+16.96
TDP	S. Ramachandra Reddy	257,958	39.19	−11.91
BJP	Seelam Krishna Reddy	108,394	16.47	
Majority		26,138	3.97	
Turnout		658,243	57.09	+2.02
INC gain from TDP		Swing		

=== 1999 ===
1999 Indian general election: Hindupur
Party	Candidate	Votes	%	±%
TDP	B. K. Parthasarathi	432,575	56.25	+17.06
INC	S. Gangadhara	297,939	38.74	−4.42
Majority		134,636	17.51	
Turnout		769,054	66.78	+9.69
TDP gain from INC		Swing		

=== 2004 ===
2004 Indian general elections: Hindupur
Party	Candidate	Votes	%	±%
INC	G. Nizamuddin	419,744	48.35	+9.61
TDP	B. K. Parthasarathi	417,904	48.14	−8.11
Independent	Prabhavathi Reddy	13,508	1.56	
Majority		1,840	0.21	
Turnout		868,063	73.61	+6.83
INC gain from TDP		Swing		

=== 2009 ===
2009 Indian general elections: Hindupur
Party	Candidate	Votes	%	±%
TDP	Kristappa Nimmala	435,753	42.45	−5.69
INC	P. Khasim Khan	412,918	40.23	−8.12
PRP	Kadapala Sreekanta Reddy	110,698	10.79	
BJP	Naresh	22,399	2.18	
Majority		22,835	2.22	
Turnout		1,026,389	74.51	+0.90
TDP gain from INC		Swing		

=== 2014 ===
2014 Indian general elections: Hindupur
Party	Candidate	Votes	%	±%
TDP	Kristappa Nimmala	604,291	51.33	
YSRCP	Duddukunta Sreedhar Reddy	506,966	43.06	
INC	G. C. Venkataramudu	36,452	3.10	
NOTA	None of the Above	8,189	0.70	
Majority		97,325	8.27	
Turnout		1,177,257	81.39	+6.88
TDP hold		Swing	+6.05	

=== 2019 ===
2019 Indian general elections: Hindupur
Party	Candidate	Votes	%	±%
YSRCP	Kuruva Gorantla Madhav	706,602	52.73	
TDP	Kristappa Nimmala	565,854	42.23	
Majority		140,748	10.50	
Turnout		13,40,027	84.91	
YSRCP gain from TDP		Swing	+18.80	

=== 2024 ===
2024 Indian general elections: Hindupur
Party	Candidate	Votes	%	±%
TDP	B. K. Parthasarathi	725,534	51.23	
YSRCP	J. Shantha	5,93,107	41.88	
INC	B. A. Samad Shaheen	55,059	3.89	
NOTA	None of the above	17,971	1.27	
Majority		1,32,427	9.35	
Turnout		14,24,863	85.91	
TDP gain from YSRCP		Swing		

== See also ==
- List of constituencies of the Andhra Pradesh Legislative Assembly
