= Duddukunta Sreedhar Reddy =

Indian politician

Duddukunta Sreedhar Reddy (born 1972) is an Indian politician from Andhra Pradesh. He is an MLA from Puttaparthi Assembly constituency in the erstwhile Anantapur district which is presently renamed as Sri Sathya Sai district. He won the 2019 Andhra Pradesh Legislative Assembly election representing YSR Congress Party. He has been nominated again by YSR Congress Party to contest the Puttaparthi Assembly seat in the 2024 Andhra Pradesh Legislative Assembly election.

== Early life and education ==
Reddy is born in Puttaparthi to Venkatarami Reddy. He completed his graduation in Arts from Sri Krishnadevaraya University. He hails from an agricultural family but runs his own business. He also served as a Customs Officer of Government of India before taking up politics.

== Career ==
Reddy started his political journey with YSR Congress Party and in 2014 he contested the Hindupur Lok Sabha constituency but lost to Telugu Desam Party candidate Kristappa Nimmala by a margin of 97,325 votes. He won the 2019 Andhra Pradesh Legislative Assembly election defeating Palle Raghunatha Reddy of Telugu Desam Party by a margin of 31,255 votes.
