= Paritala Ravindra =

Indian politician

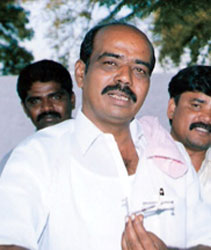

Member of Legislative Assembly, Andhra Pradesh
- In office 1994–2005
- Preceded by: Sane Venkata Ramana Reddy
- Succeeded by: B. K. Parthasarathi
- Constituency: Penukonda

Personal details
- Born: 30 August 1958 Venkatapuram, Anantapur district, Andhra Pradesh, India
- Died: 24 January 2005 (aged 46) Ananthapur, Andhra Pradesh, India
- Cause of death: Assassination
- Party: Telugu Desam Party
- Spouse: Paritala Sunitha
- Children: 3
- Occupation: Politician

Paritala Ravindra (30 August 1958 – 24 January 2005), better known as Paritala Ravi, was a politician from the Indian state of Andhra Pradesh. He was a cabinet minister in Andhra Pradesh and a Member of the Legislative Assembly (MLA). He was assassinated by his political rivals in 2005. He started as a communist and later entered electoral politics by joining the Telugu Desam Party. He was elected three times as an MLA from the Penukonda constituency in Anantapur district, Andhra Pradesh.

== Early life ==
Paritala Ravi's father, Paritala Sreeramulu, was a Naxalite leader and was close to Kondapalli Seetharamaiah of the then-monolithic People’s War Group. On 29 May 1975, Gangula Narayana Reddy, a factionist, Congress MLA and Sane Chenna Reddy, another factionist, killed Sreeramulu. Ravi was seventeen years old when his father was killed. He, along with his brother, Paritala Hari, escaped the attack.

After losing his father and brother, Ravi wanted to take shelter from his rivals. He went to his maternal uncle, Kondaiah, in Seerpi Kottaala village of Uravakonda Constituency to take shelter. He married his uncle's daughter Sunitha in 1986 and took up cultivation. He had three children. He was one of the accused in the murder of Gangula Narayana Reddy, Narsanna and Yaadi Reddy.

== Faction and Politics ==
After Narayana Reddy was killed, Ramachandra Reddy of the Telugu Desam Party became MLA from Penukonda in 1983 and 1985. In the 1989 elections, the Congress formed the government in the state. Sane Chenna Reddy became MLA of Penukonda by defeating Ramachandra Reddy of the TDP. Ravi wanted to avenge the deaths of his father and brother. He allied himself with Communist Party of India (Marxist–Leninist) People's War (PWG) who were ready to help Ravi and so plotted against Chenna Reddy. Sane Chenna Reddy, who was conspirator in his father's and brother's deaths was killed in Dharmavaram in 1991. In the subsequent by-elections, Ramana Reddy, son of Chenna Reddy, became MLA in 1991.

Paritala Ravindra was accused in the murder of 7 of Maddelacheruvu Suri's family members (including women and children) in 1995 via a TV bomb. Ravi allegedly planned the bomb to kill Suri, but Suri escaped.

Maddelacheruvu Suri tried to take vengeance by triggering a remote-controlled car bomb in Jubilee Hills, Hyderabad, in 1997, but missed his target. After his death, his wife Paritala Sunitha became MLA from his assembly constituency Penugonda.

== Assassination and aftermath ==
On 24 January 2005, hired killers detonated bombs near the Telugu Desam Party (TDP) party office and shot Ravindra, killing him instantly. He was 46 years old.

On 9 November 2008, Joolakanti Srinivas Reddy was murdered in the Anantapur jail. The main accused in the case, Maddelacheruvu Suri (Gangula Surya Narayana Reddy), was murdered by his aide Bhanu Kiran, on 4 January 2011 in Hyderabad over a property dispute. On 18 December 2018 Telangana High Court sentenced him to life. The court delivered the verdict after examining 133 witnesses, including Ravi's father-in-law Kondanna. The court convicted 8 accused - Hanumantha Reddy, Peddi Reddy, O.B. Reddy, Vadde Konda, Vadde Srinivasulu, Rekamayya, Narayana Reddy and Ranganayakulu - and the approver was Rammohan Reddy. Four accused - G B Reddy, Anand Reddy (Rice Mama), Ramaswamy and Patola Govardhan Reddy - were acquitted.

== In popular culture ==
Rakta Charitra and Rakta Charitra 2 are based on the life story of Paritala Ravi. Both films were directed by Ram Gopal Varma and theatrically released in 2010.

== See also ==
- List of assassinated Indian politicians
