= Thota Trimurthulu =

Indian politician

Thota Trimurthulu (born 22 April 1961) is an Indian politician from Andhra Pradesh. He was a three-time MLA from Ramachandrapuram in East Godavari district. He is nominated to contest as MLA on YSRCP ticket from Mandapeta Constituency in the 2024 Andhra Pradesh Legislative Assembly election. He is convicted by a court for 18 months imprisonment in a Dalit atrocities case of 1996.

== Early life and education ==
Trimurthulu was born in Venkatayapalem, Ramachandrapuram mandal, East Godavari district. He completed Class VII from Mandal Parishad Upper Primary School, Venkatayapalem in 1972. His parents Pundarikakshulu and Suryakantham, were farmers. He married Surya Kumari.

== Career ==
Trimurthulu was active as a youth leader in Ramachandrapuram and joined Telugu Desam Party in 1982, in the initial years after it was started by former Chief Minister N. T. Ramarao. He was elected as an MLA for the first in 1994 as an independent candidate from Ramachandrapuram and joined TDP in 1995. In 1999, he was elected again as an MLA on the TDP ticket. In 2004, he lost to P. Subhash Chandra Bose. In 2008, he joined Praja Rajyam Party of actor Chiranjeevi, but lost the 2009 election on PRP seat. When PRP was merged with the Congress, he got elected again in the 2012 bye-election.

After the state was bifurcated, he joined the Telugu Desam Party again and won for the third time. In 2014, contesting on the Telugu Desam Party ticket, he defeated Pilli Subhash Chandra Bose of YSRCP by a margin of 16,922 votes. In 2019, he lost to Chelluboyina Srinivasa Venugopalakrishna of YSRCP by 5,168 votes. Later in September 2019, he joined YSRCP and promised to work closely with Pilli Subhash Chandra Bose, with whom he had a deep rivalry. By then, Bose became a Deputy Chief Minister. And in June 2021, he was nominated as MLC in the Governor’s quota.

== Controversy ==
When he was an independent MLA of Ramachandrapuram, Thota Trimurthulu was the prime accused in a Dalit atrocity case registered by Draksharam police on 29 December 1996. He and a few others have tonsured the heads and shaved the eyebrows of two Dalit youths, K Chinna Raju and D Venkata Ratnam, and beat up a three other youths of Venkatayapalem village of the erstwhile East Godavari district as they did not support the rigging during the previous election. On 16 April 2024, the XI ADJ and SC & ST Court in Visakhapatnam convicted nine men, including Trimurthulu to 18 months imprisonment and a fine of Rs.42,000 each.
