= Puttaparthi Assembly constituency =

Constituency of the Andhra Pradesh Legislative Assembly, India

Coordinates: 14.17°N 77.81°E

Puttaparthi
- Constituency No. 159 for the Andhra Pradesh Legislative Assembly
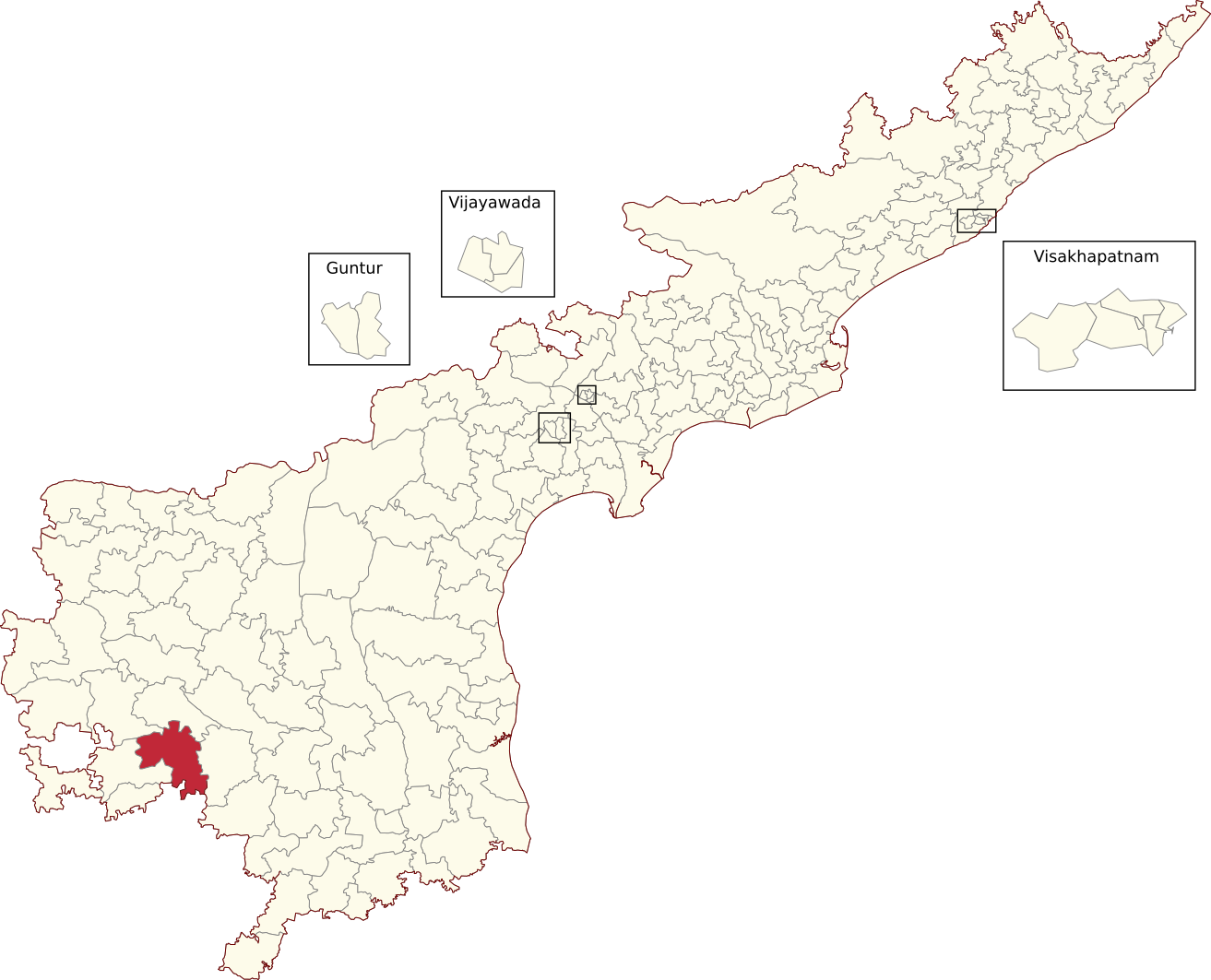
- Location of Puttaparthi Assembly constituency within Andhra Pradesh

Constituency details
- Country: India
- Region: South India
- State: Andhra Pradesh
- District: Sri Sathya Sai
- Lok Sabha constituency: Hindupur
- Established: 2008
- Total electors: 199,675
- Reservation: None

Member of Legislative Assembly
- 16th Andhra Pradesh Legislative Assembly
- Incumbent Palle Sindhura Reddy
- Party: TDP
- Alliance: NDA
- Elected year: 2024

Puttaparthi Assembly constituency is a constituency in Sri Sathya Sai district of Andhra Pradesh that elects representatives to the Andhra Pradesh Legislative Assembly in India. It is one the seven assembly segments of Hindupur Lok Sabha constituency.

Palle Sindhura Reddy is the current MLA of the constituency, having won the 2024 Andhra Pradesh Legislative Assembly election from Telugu Desam Party. As of 2019, there are a total of 199,675 electors in the constituency. The constituency was established in 2008, as per the Delimitation Orders (2008).

== Mandals ==
Mandal
Nallamada
Bukkapatnam
Kothacheruvu
Puttaparthi
O.D. Cheruvu
Amadaguru

== Members of the Legislative Assembly ==
Year	Member	Political party
2009	Palle Raghunatha Reddy	Telugu Desam Party
2014	Palle Raghunatha Reddy	Telugu Desam Party
2019	Duddukunta Sreedhar Reddy	YSR Congress Party
2024	Palle Sindhura Reddy	Telugu Desam Party

== Election results ==
=== 2009 ===
2009 Andhra Pradesh Legislative Assembly election: Puttaparthi
Party	Candidate	Votes	%	±%
TDP	Palle Raghunatha Reddy	59,356	43.24	
INC	Kadapala Mohan Reddy	58,335	42.49	
PRP	Pasupuleti Ramana	12,777	9.37	
Majority		1,021	0.75	
Turnout		137,276	76.86	
TDP win (new seat)				

=== 2014 ===
2014 Andhra Pradesh Legislative Assembly election: Puttaparthi
Party	Candidate	Votes	%	±%
TDP	Palle Raghunatha Reddy	76,910	50.30	+7.06
YSRCP	Chinthapanti Somasekhara Reddy	69,946	45.75	
Majority		6,964	4.55	
Turnout		152,893	82.18	+5.32
TDP hold		Swing		

=== 2019 ===
2019 Andhra Pradesh Legislative Assembly election: Puttaparthi
Party	Candidate	Votes	%	±%
YSRCP	Duddukunta Sreedhar Reddy	97,234	56.77	+11.02
TDP	Palle Raghunatha Reddy	65,979	38.52	−7.23
Majority		31,255	18.25	
Turnout		171,291	87.78	+5.60
YSRCP gain from TDP		Swing		

=== 2024 ===
2024 Andhra Pradesh Legislative Assembly election: Puttaparthi
Party	Candidate	Votes	%	±%
TDP	Palle Sindhura Reddy	91,741	49.87	
YSRCP	Duddukunta Sreedhar Reddy	82,981	45.10	
BSP	Ampavathini Govindhu	3,811	2.07	
NOTA	None of the above	1,382	0.75	
Majority		8,760	4.77	
Turnout		1,83,975		
TDP gain from YSRCP		Swing		

== See also ==
- List of constituencies of Andhra Pradesh Legislative Assembly
