= Vasamsetti Subhash =

Indian politician

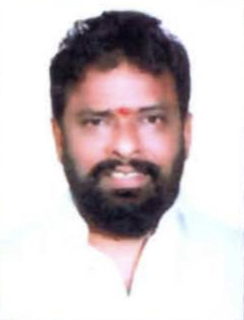

Minister for Labour, Factories, Boilers & Insurance Medical Services Government of Andhra Pradesh
- Incumbent
- Assumed office 12 June 2024
- Governor: S. Abdul Nazeer
- Chief Minister: N. Chandrababu Naidu
- Preceded by: Gummanur Jayaram

Member of Legislative Assembly Andhra Pradesh
- Incumbent
- Assumed office 4 June 2024
- Preceded by: Chelluboyina Venugopala Krishna
- Constituency: Ramachandrapuram

Vasamsetti Subhash is an Indian politician from Andhra Pradesh. He is a member of the Telugu Desam Party. He has been elected as the Member of the Legislative Assembly representing the Ramachandrapuram Assembly constituency in the 2024 Andhra Pradesh Legislative Assembly elections.

== Political career ==
Subhash won the 2024 Andhra Pradesh Legislative Assembly elections from the Ramachandrapuram Assembly constituency by defeating Pilli Surya Prakash of YSRCP by a margin of 26,291 votes. He was appointed the Minister for Labour, Factories, Boilers & Insurance Medical Services in the cabinet of Chief Minister N. Chandrababu Naidu.
