= Pilli Subhash Chandra Bose =

7th Deputy Chief Minister of Andhra Pradesh

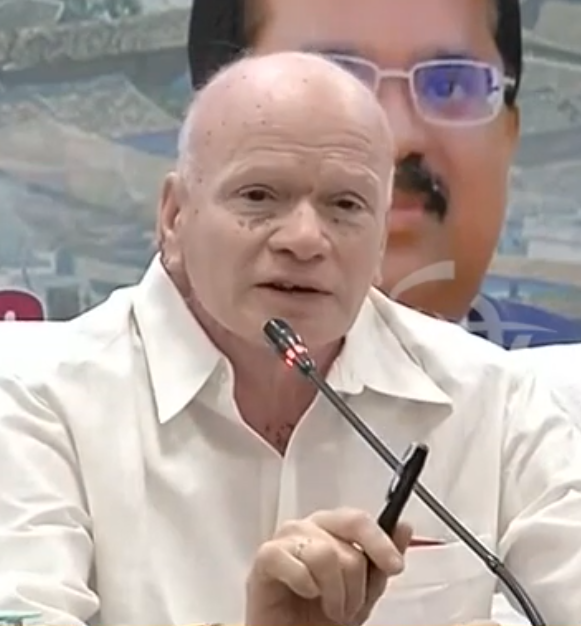

Member of Parliament, Rajya Sabha
- In office 22 June 2020 – 21 June 2026
- Preceded by: T. Subbarami Reddy
- Succeeded by: Chintakayala Vijay
- Constituency: Andhra Pradesh

8th Deputy Chief Minister of Andhra Pradesh
- In office 8 June 2019 – 21 July 2020 Serving with Amzath Basha Shaik Bepari; Alla Nani; K. Narayana Swamy; Pamula Pushpa Sreevani
- Governor: E. S. L. Narasimhan; Biswabhusan Harichandan
- Chief Minister: Y. S. Jaganmohan Reddy
- Preceded by: Nimmakayala Chinarajappa; K. E. Krishnamurthy
- Succeeded by: Dharmana Krishna Das

Minister of Revenue, Registration and Stamps Government of Andhra Pradesh
- In office 8 June 2019 – 21 July 2020
- Governor: E. S. L. Narasimhan
- Chief Minister: Y. S. Jagan Mohan Reddy
- Preceded by: K. E. Krishnamurthy
- Succeeded by: Dharmana Krishna Das

Minister of Social Welfare Government of Andhra Pradesh
- In office 2007–2009
- Governor: Rameshwar Thakur; N. D. Tiwari
- Chief Minister: Y. S. Rajasekhara Reddy
- Succeeded by: Pithani Satyanarayana

Member of the Legislative Assembly Andhra Pradesh
- In office 2004–2012
- Preceded by: Thota Trimurthulu
- Succeeded by: Thota Trimurthulu
- Constituency: Ramachandrapuram
- In office 1989–1994
- Preceded by: M. Veera Venkata Rama Rao
- Succeeded by: Thota Trimurthulu
- Constituency: Ramachandrapuram

Member of Legislative Council Andhra Pradesh
- In office 30 March 2015 – 1 July 2020
- Chairman: A. Chakrapani; N. M. D. Farooq; Shariff Mohammed Ahmed
- Leader of the House: N. Chandrababu Naidu; Y. S. Jagan Mohan Reddy
- Constituency: Elected by MLAs

Personal details
- Party: YSR Congress Party
- Other political affiliations: Indian National Congress (before 2011)
- Occupation: Politician

Pilli Subhash Chandra Bose is an Indian politician from Andhra Pradesh. He was elected to the Rajya Sabha, upper house of the Parliament of India from Andhra Pradesh in the 2020 Rajyasabha elections as a member of the YSR Congress Party.

He served as the 8th Deputy Chief Minister of Andhra Pradesh. He was a member of the Andhra Pradesh Legislative Council.

== Political career ==
He was a cabinet member and MLA during the Indian National Congress (INC) government in Andhra Pradesh when he resigned and joined the YSR Congress Party in 2011. He then unsuccessfully contested the by-elections to Ramachandrapuram in 2012 but lost to the INC candidate Thota Trimurthulu.

He represented the Ramachandrapuram Assembly Constituency. He belongs to the YSR Congress Party and is a loyalist to late Y.S.Rajasekhara Reddy's family.

He was also minister twice in the YS Rajasekhara Reddy's cabinet and once in former chief minister Konijeti Rosaiah's cabinet. He resigned as an MLA from Ramachandrapuram as well as K. Rosaiah's cabinet to join the YSR Congress party a party led by Y. S. Jaganmohan Reddy son of YS Rajasekhara Reddy.

In 2019, he became one of the five Deputy Chief Ministers of Andhra Pradesh in the Y. S. Jaganmohan Reddy led cabinet and was also given a charge of Minister of Revenue, Registration, and Stamps.

After the Government of Andhra Pradesh decided to abolish the Andhra Pradesh Legislative Council, YSR Congress decided to send him to Rajya Sabha because he was a member of the Andhra Pradesh Legislative Council.
