= Nimmala Kristappa =

Indian politician

Member of Parliament, Lok Sabha
- In office 2009–2019
- Preceded by: G Nizamuddin
- Succeeded by: Kuruva Gorantla Madhav
- Constituency: Hindupur

Personal details
- Born: 25 November 1956 (age 69) Perumalapalli, Gorantla Taluk, Anantapur District, Andhrapradesh
- Party: Independent
- Other political affiliations: Telugu Desam Party
- Spouse: Nimmala Varalakshmi
- Children: 2 sons
- As of 20 November, 2010

Nimmala Kistappa is an Indian politician, belonging to Telugu Desam Party. In the 2009 election he was elected to the Lok Sabha from the Hindupur constituency in Andhra Pradesh. He is interested in bringing about skill development training programmes to youth and adolescents; Rural employment and vocational education; and micro credit to poor rural women, small and marginal farmers.

== Personal life ==
Kistappa is married to Varalakshmi. They have 2 children. He was born in Perumalapalli Village in Anantapur district of Andhrapradesh. At present, his residence at gorantla Village in Ananthapur district of Andhra Pradesh.

== Political career ==
Kistappa has had a long career in politics. He started political career as Mandal President after getting elected in Local Body Elections. During the last three decades, he has been serving with commitment and dedication in the most backward and drought-prone areas of Anantapur District working for the betterment of SC/ST/OBC and minorities in the State of Andhra Pradesh. He became a Member of the Andhra Pradesh Legislative Assembly in 1994 and for a second term in 1999. He was elected to the Lok Sabha in 2009. He was the second TDP leader to win a Lok Sabha seat in the entire factional-violence hit Rayalaseema region. He was Re-elected to the 16th Lok Sabha in 2014. At the Lok Sabha he was a member of the Committee on Health and Family Welfare, Committee on Food Management in Parliament House Complex, Standing Committee on Transport, Tourism and Culture, Consultative Committee, Ministry of Water Resources and River Development and Ganga Rejuvenation.
