= K. V. Ramakrishna Reddy =

Indian politician

Member of Parliament, Lok Sabha
- In office 1957-1967
- Succeeded by: N. Sanjiva Reddy
- Constituency: Hindupur, Andhra Pradesh

Personal details
- Born: 1907 Kadapalavaripalle, Kadiri Taluk, Anantapur District, Madras Presidency, British India
- Party: Indian National Congress

K. V. Ramakrishna Reddy was an Indian politician. He was a Member of Parliament, representing Hindupur, Andhra Pradesh in the Lok Sabha the lower house of India's Parliament as a member of the Indian National Congress.
