= Palle Sindhura Reddy =

Indian politician

Member of Legislative Assembly Andhra Pradesh
- Incumbent
- Assumed office 2024
- Preceded by: Duddukunta Sreedhar Reddy
- Constituency: Puttaparthi

Personal details
- Party: Telugu Desam Party

Palle Sindhura Reddy (born 2 August 1990) is an Indian politician from Andhra Pradesh. She is an MLA from Puttaparthi Assembly Constituency in Sri Sathya Sai District. She represents Telugu Desam Party. She won the 2024 Andhra Pradesh Legislative Assembly election.

== Early life and education ==
Sindhura did all her schooling in Kerala. She completed her B.Tech in Chemical Engineering at Amrita School of Engineering, Coimbatore. She completed M.Tech. in Nano technology at Amrita Centre for Nanosciences and Molecular Medicine, Kochi Amrita Vishwa Vidyapeetham in 2013. She married Palle Venkata Krishna Reddy, Chairman, Balaji Educational Society, which runs several colleges in Anantapur district. They have twins, a son and a daughter. She is the daughter-in-law of Palle Raghunatha Reddy, a senior TDP politician and the founder of Balaji Educational Society. Her father is N Shanker Reddy IPS, a retired DGP from Kerala cadre.

== Political career ==
Sindhura won the 2024 Andhra Pradesh Legislative Assembly election from Puttaparthi Assembly Constituency representing Telugu Desam Party. She polled 91,741 votes with a vote share of 49.87 per cent and defeated sitting MLA Duddukunta Sreedhar Reddy of YSR Congress Party by a margin of 8,760 votes.
