= S. Ramachandra Reddy =

Indian politician

Member of Parliament, Lok Sabha
- In office 1996–1998
- Preceded by: S. Gangadhar
- Succeeded by: S. Gangadhar
- Constituency: Hindupur

Member of the Legislative Assembly of Andhra Pradesh
- In office 1983–1989
- Preceded by: Somandepalli Narayana Reddy
- Succeeded by: Sane Chenna Reddy
- Constituency: Penukonda

Personal details
- Born: Penukonda, Anantapur
- Party: Telugu Desam Party
- Spouse: S. Gayathramma
- Children: Five
- Occupation: Politician

S. Ramachandra Reddy (6 September 1944-2005) was an Indian politician from Penukonda, Anantapur district. He belonged to the Kuruba caste.

== Political life ==
In 1983, he contested from Penukonda and won as MLA by defeating Gangula Narayana Reddy. Later in 1985 he contested from Telugu Desam party and won by defeating G Veeranna of the Congress Party. This time he became Minister in N. T. Rama Rao's government. He served as minister for Industry and Ports and Chairman of Backward Classes Welfare Committee. But he lost to S Chenna Reddy in the 1989 elections. In 1996 he won as MP from Hindupur (Lok Sabha constituency) by defeating S. Gangadhar, with a 172,422 vote majority. In 1998 he was defeated by S. Gangadhar.
