= Munimadugu =

Munimadugu is a village in Penugonda mandal, Sri Sathya Sai district of Andhra Pradesh, India.
