= Paidi Lakshmayya =

Indian politician

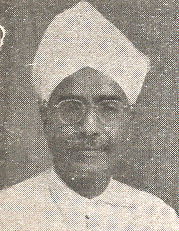

Member of Parliament
- In office 1952–1956
- Succeeded by: T. Nagi Reddy
- Constituency: Anantapur constituency

Personal details
- Born: 6 June 1904 Achampalli, Kambadur Mdl, Anantapur district
- Died: 28 April 1987 (aged 83) Hyderabad
- Party: Indian National Congress
- Spouse: Lakshmamma
- Children: 3

Paidi Lakshmayya BA, B.L. (Telugu: పైడి లక్ష్మయ్య) (26 April 1904 – 28 April 1987) was an Indian parliamentarian, actor, writer and administrator. He was born to Shri Musalappa in Achampalle village in Kambadur mandal in Anantapur district, Andhra Pradesh, India. After primary education in the village, he graduated as Telugu language as main subject in 1932. He studied for a Bachelor of Law degree from Madras Law College.

== Early life ==
He was member of Congress party from 1947. After a successful tenure in local politics, he was elected to the 1st Lok Sabha from Ananthapur constituency in 1952 as a member of the Indian National Congress. He visited Russia as a Parliamentary delegation and drafted useful suggestions on Agricultural reforms.

In 1957 Andhra Pradesh appointed him as Commissioner of the Endowments department. During his tenure he developed many Hindu temples in Andhra Pradesh. He took special interest in the development of Srisailam temple. Later on he worked as Chairman of Srisailam Devasthanam.

He wrote some dramas and poetic works; important amongst these are Markandeya vijayam, Mahatma Kabir, Samsara Nauka, Sai Leelalu, Srisaila Mallikarjuna Mahatyam, Srisaileeyam. He was President of Rayalaseema Dramatic Association, Anantapur between 1944 and 1949. He wrote his autobiography with title "Jnapakalu – Vyapakalu" in 1984.

Andhra University honored him with Kala Prapoorna (Honorary Doctorate).
