= Penukonda Assembly constituency =

Constituency of the Andhra Pradesh Legislative Assembly, India

Coordinates: 14.09°N 77.60°E

Penukonda
- Constituency No. 158 for the Andhra Pradesh Legislative Assembly
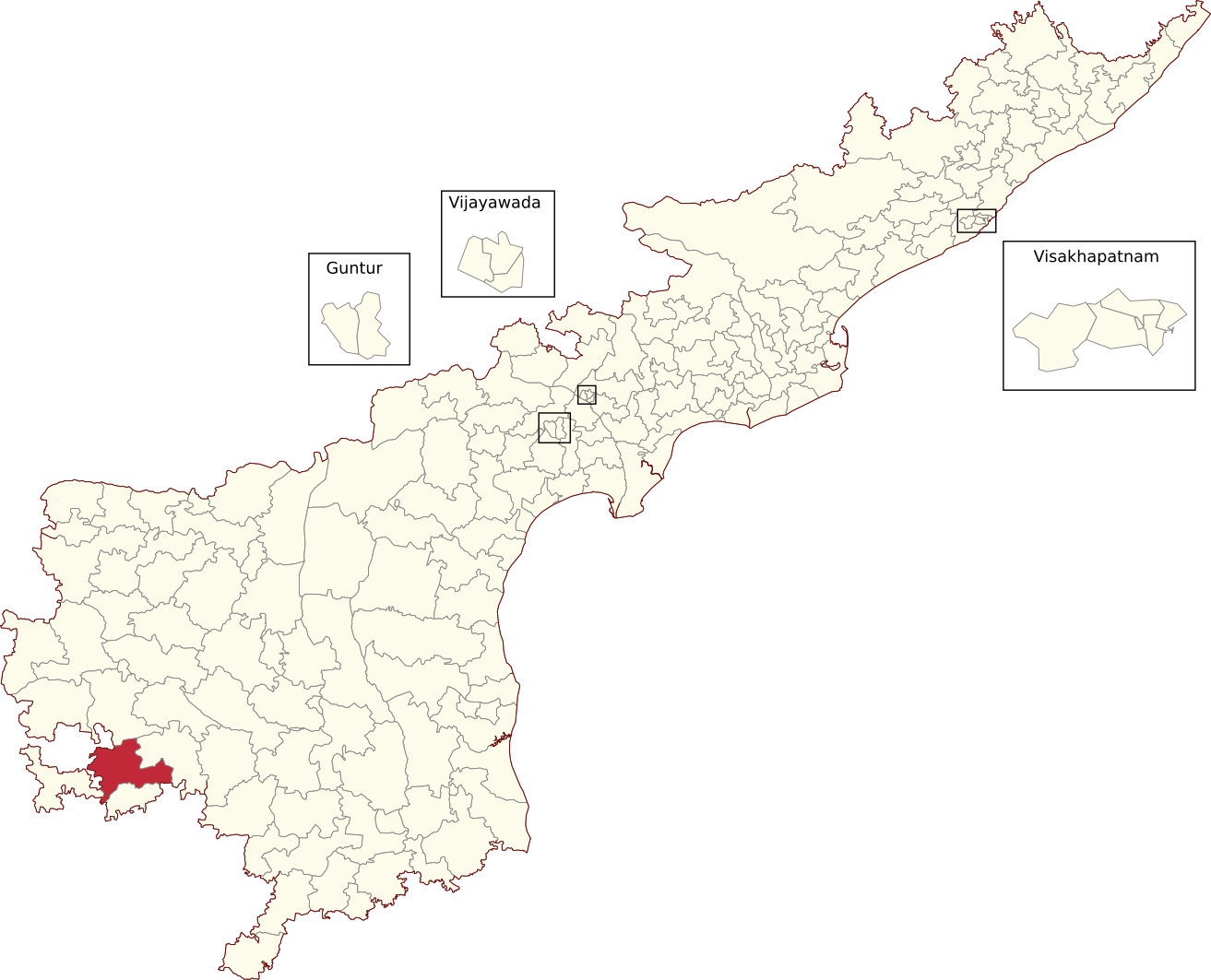
- Location of Penukonda Assembly constituency within Andhra Pradesh

Constituency details
- Country: India
- Region: South India
- State: Andhra Pradesh
- District: Sri Sathya Sai
- Lok Sabha constituency: Hindupur
- Established: 1951
- Total electors: 220,383
- Reservation: None

Member of Legislative Assembly
- 16th Andhra Pradesh Legislative Assembly
- Incumbent S. Savitha
- Party: TDP
- Alliance: NDA
- Elected year: 2024

Penukonda Assembly constituency is a constituency in Sri Sathya Sai district of Andhra Pradesh that elects representatives to the Andhra Pradesh Legislative Assembly in India. It is one the seven assembly segments of Hindupur Lok Sabha constituency.

S. Savitha is the current MLA of the constituency, having won the 2024 Andhra Pradesh Legislative Assembly election from Telugu Desam Party. As of 2019, there are a total of 220,383 electors in the constituency. The constituency was established in 1951, as per the Delimitation Orders (1951).

== Mandals ==
Mandal
Parigi
Penukonda
Gorantla
Somandepalle
Roddam

== Members of the Legislative Assembly ==
Year	Member	Political party
1952	Lakshminarayana Reddy	Independent
1955	Chithambara Reddy	Indian National Congress
1962	Narasi Reddy	Independent
1967	Narasi Reddy	Indian National Congress
1972	Somandepalli Narayana Reddy	Indian National Congress
1978	Somandepalli Narayana Reddy	Indian National Congress
1983	S. Ramachandra Reddy	Telugu Desam Party
1985	S. Ramachandra Reddy	Telugu Desam Party
1989	Sane Chenna Reddy	Indian National Congress
1991 by-election	Sane Venkata Ramana Reddy	Indian National Congress
1994	Paritala Ravindra	Telugu Desam Party
1996 by-election	Paritala Ravindra	Telugu Desam Party
1999	Paritala Ravindra	Telugu Desam Party
2004	Paritala Ravindra	Telugu Desam Party
2005 by-election	Paritala Sunitha	Telugu Desam Party
2009	B. K. Parthasarathi	Telugu Desam Party
2014	B. K. Parthasarathi	Telugu Desam Party
2019	Malagundla Sankaranarayana	YSR Congress Party
2024	S. Savitha	Telugu Desam Party

== Election results ==
=== 1952 ===
1952 Madras Legislative Assembly election: Penukonda
Party	Candidate	Votes	%	±%
Independent	Lakshminarayana Reddy	16,423	37.08	
INC	Chitambara Reddy	14,237	32.14	32.14
KMPP	Suryanarayana Reddy	12,205	27.56	
Margin of victory		2,186	4.94	
Turnout		44,291	64.38	
Registered electors		68,796		
Independent win (new seat)				

=== 1978 ===
1978 Andhra Pradesh Legislative Assembly election: Penukonda
Party	Candidate	Votes	%	±%
INC(I)	Somandepalli Narayana Reddy	30,415	45.7	
JP	Gangula Narayana Reddy	29,775	44.8	
INC	Gottipati Syam Prasad	3,980	6.0	
Majority				
Turnout				
INC(I) gain from INC		Swing		

=== 1983 ===
1983 Andhra Pradesh Legislative Assembly election: Penukonda
Party	Candidate	Votes	%	±%
TDP	S. Ramachandra Reddy	34,731	47.1	
Independent	Gangula Narayana Reddy	19,843	26.9	
INC	Somandepalli Narayana Reddy	19,195	26.0	
Majority				
Turnout				
TDP gain from INC(I)		Swing		

=== 1985 ===
1985 Andhra Pradesh Legislative Assembly election: Penukonda
Party	Candidate	Votes	%	±%
TDP	S. Ramachandra Reddy	43,449	54.7	
INC	G. Veeranna	35,933	45.3	
Majority				
Turnout				
TDP hold		Swing		

=== 1989 ===
1989 Andhra Pradesh Legislative Assembly election: Penukonda
Party	Candidate	Votes	%	±%
INC	Sane Chenna Reddy	46,065	54.7	
TDP	S. Ramachandra Reddy	35,518	42.0	
Majority				
Turnout				
INC gain from TDP		Swing		

=== 1991 by-election ===
2011 Andhra Pradesh Legislative Assembly by-election: Penukonda
Party	Candidate	Votes	%	±%
INC	Sane Venkata Ramana Reddy	66,563	64.45	
TDP	G. Lingappa	36,010	34.87	
Majority				
Turnout				
INC hold		Swing		

=== 1994 ===
1994 Andhra Pradesh Legislative Assembly election: Penukonda
Party	Candidate	Votes	%	±%
TDP	Paritala Ravindra	66,034	61.7	
INC	Sane Venkata Ramana Reddy	37,987	35.5	
Majority				
Turnout				
TDP gain from INC		Swing		

=== 1999 ===
1999 Andhra Pradesh Legislative Assembly election: Penukonda
Party	Candidate	Votes	%	±%
TDP	Paritala Ravindra	71,695	70.8	
INC	Bellam Subramanyam	13,818	13.7	
Majority				
Turnout				
TDP hold		Swing		

=== 2004 ===
2004 Andhra Pradesh Legislative Assembly election: Penukonda
Party	Candidate	Votes	%	±%
TDP	Paritala Ravindra	71,000	57.06	−13.76
INC	Gangula Bhanumathi	49,758	39.45	+25.80
Majority		22,211	17.61	
Turnout		126,126	75.34	+11.95
TDP hold		Swing		

=== 2009 ===
2009 Andhra Pradesh Legislative Assembly election: Penukonda
Party	Candidate	Votes	%	±%
TDP	B. K. Parthasarathi	68,500	44.89	−12.16
INC	K. T. Sreedhar	54,015	35.45	−4.00
PRP	K. Ramesh Babu	19,577	12.85	
Majority		14,385	9.44	
Turnout		152,382	75.26	−0.08
TDP hold		Swing		

=== 2014 ===
2014 Andhra Pradesh Legislative Assembly election: Penukonda
Party	Candidate	Votes	%	±%
TDP	B. K. Parthasarathi	79,793	47.46	
YSRCP	Malagundla Sankaranarayana	62,378	37.11	
Majority		17,415	10.35	
Turnout		168,110	83.43	+8.17
TDP hold		Swing		

=== 2019 ===
2019 Andhra Pradesh Legislative Assembly election: Penukonda
Party	Candidate	Votes	%	±%
YSRCP	Malagundla Sankaranarayana	96,607	51.08	
TDP	B. K. Parthasarathi	81,549	43.12	
Majority		15,058	7.96	
Turnout		1,89,114	85.81	+2.38
YSRCP gain from TDP		Swing		

=== 2024 ===
2024 Andhra Pradesh Legislative Assembly election: Penukonda
Party	Candidate	Votes	%	±%
TDP	S. Savitha	113,832	54.83	
YSRCP	K. V. Ushashri Charan	80,444	38.75	
INC	P. Narasimhappa	4,007	1.93	
NOTA	None Of The Above	1,972	0.95	
Majority		33,388	16.08	
Turnout		2,07,615		
TDP gain from YSRCP		Swing		

== See also ==
- List of constituencies of Andhra Pradesh Legislative Assembly
