= Ramachandrapuram Assembly constituency =

Constituency of the Andhra Pradesh Legislative Assembly, India

Coordinates: 16.84°N 82.03°E

Ramachandrapuram
- Constituency No. 42 for the Andhra Pradesh Legislative Assembly
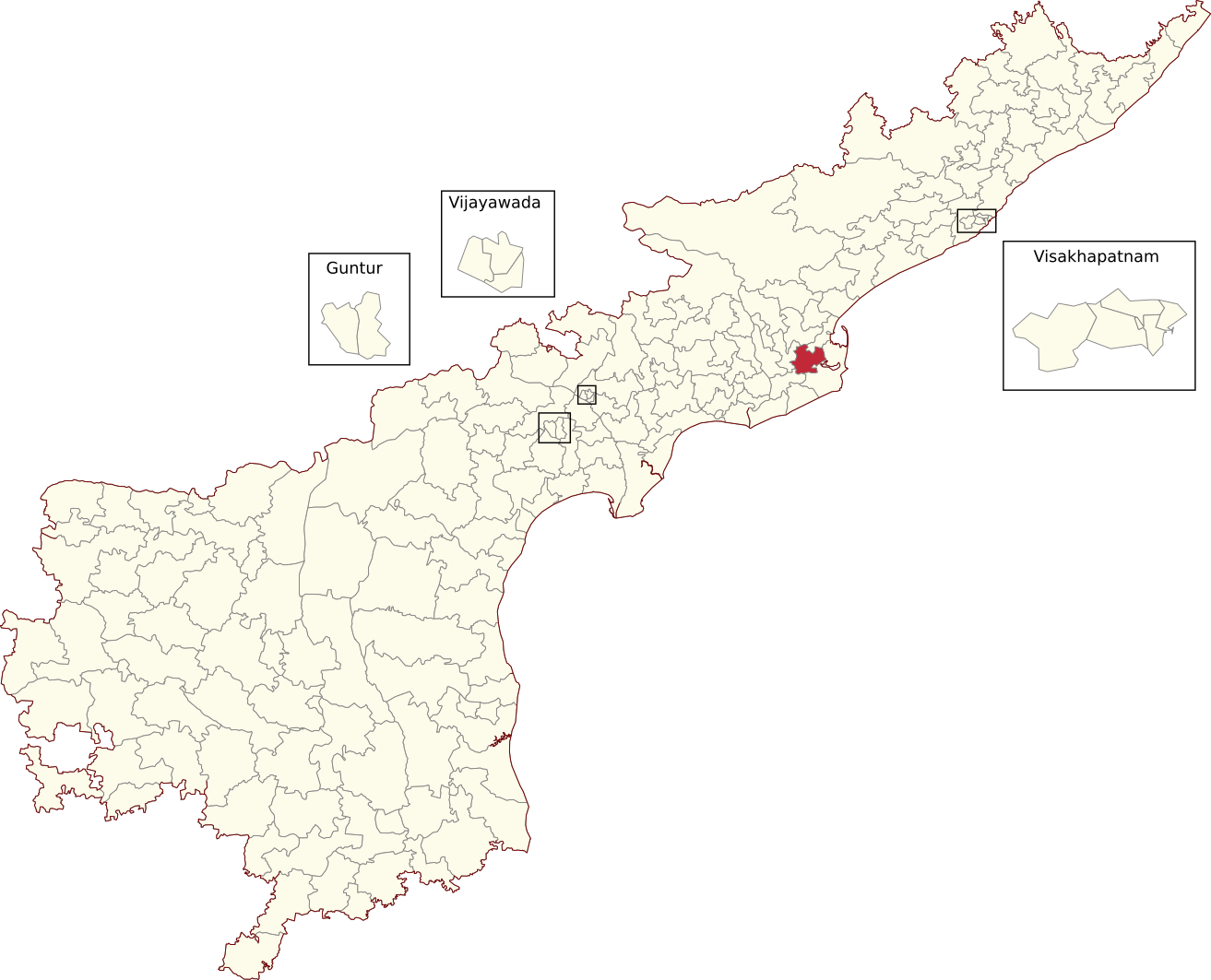
- Location of Ramachandrapuram Assembly constituency within Andhra Pradesh

Constituency details
- Country: India
- Region: South India
- State: Andhra Pradesh
- District: Konaseema
- Lok Sabha constituency: Amalapuram
- Established: 1951
- Total electors: 193,742
- Reservation: None

Member of Legislative Assembly
- 16th Andhra Pradesh Legislative Assembly
- Incumbent Vasamsetti Subhash
- Party: TDP
- Alliance: NDA
- Elected year: 2024

Ramachandrapuram Assembly constituency is a constituency in Konaseema district of Andhra Pradesh that elects representatives to the Andhra Pradesh Legislative Assembly in India. It is one of the seven assembly segments of Amalapuram Lok Sabha constituency.

Vasamsetti Subhash is the current MLA of the constituency, having won the 2019 Andhra Pradesh Legislative Assembly election from Telugu Desam Party. As of 2019, there are a total of 193,742 electors in the constituency. The constituency was established in 1951, as per the Delimitation Orders (1951).

== Mandals ==
The three mandals that form the assembly constituency are:

Mandal
Kajuluru
Ramachandrapuram
K.Gangavaram

== Members of the Legislative Assembly ==
Year	Member	Political party
1952	K. Rajagopalanarasaraju	Kisan Mazdoor Praja Party
1955	K. S. R. Ramachandraraju Bahadur	Praja Party
1962	N. Satyanrayanarao	Independent
1967	N. Veerraju	Independent
1970	M. S. Sanjeevi	NCJ
1972	Reddy Satyanarayana	Indian National Congress
1978	Apparao Pilli	Independent
1983	K. S. R. Ramachandra Raju	Telugu Desam Party
1985	M. Vera Venka Rama Rao	Telugu Desam Party
1989	Pilli Subhash Chandra Bose	Indian National Congress
1994	Thota Trimurthulu	Independent
1999	Thota Trimurthulu	Telugu Desam Party
2004	Pilli Subhash Chandra Bose	Indian National Congress
2009	Pilli Subhash Chandra Bose	Indian National Congress
2012	Thota Trimurthulu	Indian National Congress
2014	Thota Trimurthulu	Telugu Desam Party
2019	Chelluboyina Srinivasa Venugopalakrishna	YSR Congress Party
2024	Vasamsetti Subhash	Telugu Desam Party

== Election results ==
=== 1952 ===
1952 Madras Legislative Assembly election: Ramachandrapuram
Party	Candidate	Votes	%	±%
KMPP	Kakarlapudi Rajagopalanarasaraju	30,603	65.20%	
INC	Mallipudi Pallanraju	16,334	34.80%	34.80%
Margin of victory		14,269	30.40%	
Turnout		46,937	74.45%	
Registered electors		63,049		
KMPP win (new seat)				

=== 1955 ===
1955 Andhra State Legislative Assembly election: Ramachandrapuram
Party	Candidate	Votes	%	±%
KMPP	K. S. R. Bahadur	27,317	68.36	▲3.16
CPI	Pedapati Rao	12,182	30.48	
Independent	Tetali Reddi	463	1.16	
Majority		15,135	37.88	▲7.48
Turnout		69,962	68.79	▼5.66
KMPP hold		Swing		

=== 1962 ===
1962 Andhra Pradesh Legislative Assembly election: Ramachandrapuram
Party	Candidate	Votes	%	±%
Independent	Nandivada Satyanrayanarao	20,270	54.49	
INC	K. Kamala Devi	16,927	45.50	
Majority		3,343	8.99	▼28.89
Turnout		37,197		
Independent gain from KMPP		Swing		

=== 1967 ===
1967 Andhra Pradesh Legislative Assembly election: Ramachandrapuram
Party	Candidate	Votes	%	±%
Independent	N. Veerraju	14,929	29.85	▲3
INC	Nandivada Satyanrayanarao (incumbent)	12,344	24.68	▼29.81
Independent	V.S.S.R. Telidevara	8,661	17.32	
Independent	K.C. Kantipudi	5,844	11.69	
Independent	D.C. Reddi	4,449	8.90	
Independent	A.R.R. Manthina	3,242	6.48	
Independent	K.P. Reddy	542	1.08	
Majority		18,142	5.17	▼3.82
Turnout		50,011	70.48	
Independent hold		Swing		

=== 1972 ===
1972 Andhra Pradesh Legislative Assembly election: Ramachandrapuram
Party	Candidate	Votes	%	±%
INC	Reddy Satyanarayana	32,349	52.03	▲27.35
Independent	Pilla Janakiramayya	27,721	44.59	
ABJS	Alla Rao	1,375	2.21	
Independent	Nunnavenkatareddi Naidu	413	0.66	
Independent	P.L. Manyam	310	0.50	
Majority		4,628	7.44	▲2.27
Turnout		62,168	74.40	▲3.92
INC gain from Independent		Swing		

=== 1978 ===
1978 Andhra Pradesh Legislative Assembly election: Ramachandrapuram
Party	Candidate	Votes	%	±%
Independent	Apparao Pilli	19,306	25.5	
JP	Mudragada Naidu	19,045	25.2	
INC	Gadam Kamladevi	18,764	24.8	
INC(I)	Reddy Satyanarayana	16,660	22	▼30.03
Independent	Bodapati Paparao	1,392	1.8	
Independent	Satyanandam Katakam	452	0.6	
Majority		261	0.3	▼7.14
Turnout		77,045	77.3	▲2.9
Independent gain from INC		Swing		

=== 1983 ===
1983 Andhra Pradesh Legislative Assembly election: Ramachandrapuram
Party	Candidate	Votes	%	±%
TDP	K. S. R. Ramachandra Raju	39,186	51.2	
INC	Vundavili Munsif	14,195	18.6	▼3.4
Independent	Pilli Rao	13,307	17.4	
Independent	Pepakyala Satyanarayana	9,607	12.6	
INC(J)	Satyanandam Katakam	221	0.3	▼0.3
Majority		24,991	32.3	▲32
Turnout		77,462	75.4	▼1.9
TDP gain from Independent		Swing		

=== 1985 ===
1985 Andhra Pradesh Legislative Assembly election: Ramachandrapuram
Party	Candidate	Votes	%	±%
TDP	Medisetti Rao	41,978	54.2	▲3
INC	Pilli Subhash Chandra Bose	23,836	30.8	▲12.2
Independent	Pilli Rao	7,501	9.7	▼7.7
Independent	Mallipudi Veera Swamy	3,264	4.2	
Independent	Kodury Rao	460	0.6	
Independent	Vinjamuri Lahshmana Sarma	442	0.6	
Majority		18,142	23.2	▼9.1
Turnout		78,273	71.5	▼3.9
TDP hold		Swing		

=== 1989 ===
1989 Andhra Pradesh Legislative Assembly election: Ramachandrapuram
Party	Candidate	Votes	%	±%
INC	Pilli Subhash Chandra Bose	53,326	58.3	▲27.5
TDP	Kudipudi Rao	35,164	38.4	▼15.8
Independent	Matcha Rao	1,241	1.4	▼28.5
Independent	Gade Rao	453	0.5	
Independent	Ujuri Peda Veerraju	389	0.4	
Independent	Mada Murty	336	0.4	
Independent	Devarapalli Narayanarao	168	0.2	
Independent	Naduri Chitteyya	151	0.2	
Independent	Sayyaparaju Venkatasomaraju	146	0.2	
Independent	Guttula Prabhavathi	110	0.1	
Majority		18,162	19.3	▼3.9
Turnout		94,018	75.0	▲3.5
INC hold		Swing		

=== 1994 ===
1994 Andhra Pradesh Legislative Assembly election: Ramachandrapuram
Party	Candidate	Votes	%	±%
Independent	Thota Trimurthulu	34,027	35.1	
TDP	Guttula Babu	30,923	31.9	▼6.5
INC	Pilli Subhash Chandra Bose (incumbent)	28,896	29.8	▼28.5
Independent	Settibathula Rajababu	1,516	1.6	
BJP	Vantipalli Murthy	642	0.7	
Independent	Tappetla Chittibabu	208	0.2	
Independent	Mada Murthy	183	0.2	
Independent	Kambhampati Venkata Satyanarayana	136	0.1	
Independent	Tantravathi Rao	128	0.1	
Independent	Kulukuri Rao	96	0.1	
Independent	Kulukuri Rao	96	0.1	
Independent	Palivela Rao	91	0.1	
Independent	Marneedi Rao	79	0.1	
Independent	Koripella Rao	68	0.1	
Majority		3,104	3.2	▼16.1
Turnout		98,129	77.5	▲2.5
Independent hold		Swing		

=== 1999 ===
1999 Andhra Pradesh Legislative Assembly election: Ramachandrapuram
Party	Candidate	Votes	%	±%
TDP	Thota Trimurthulu	46,417	45.9	▲10.8
INC	Subhaschandra Bose Pilli	27,242	26.9	▼2.9
Independent	Guttula Babu	26,455	26.1	▼5.8
Ajeya Bharat Party	Satyanarayana Koripella	273	0.3	
Marxist Communist Party Of India (S.S.SRIVASTAVA)	Madda Murty	247	0.2	
Anna Telugu Desam Party	China Mernidi	230	0.2	
Independent	Pappula Masenu Venkanna	202	0.2	
Independent	Govindarajulu Thota	128	0.1	
Majority		19,175	18.3	▲15.1
Turnout		104,747	76.3	▼1.2
TDP hold		Swing		

=== 2004 ===
2004 Andhra Pradesh Legislative Assembly election: Ramachandrapuram
Party	Candidate	Votes	%	±%
INC	Pilli Subhash Chandra Bose	53,160	50.69	
TDP	Thota Trimurthulu	45,604	43.48	
Majority		7,556	7.21	
Turnout		104,873	82.64	+8.91
INC gain from TDP		Swing		

=== 2009 ===
2009 Andhra Pradesh Legislative Assembly election: Ramachandrapuram
Party	Candidate	Votes	%	±%
INC	Pilli Subhash Chandra Bose	56,589	39.89	
PRP	Thota Trimurthulu	52,558	37.05	
TDP	Guttula Sri Suryanarayana Babu	23,252	16.39	
Majority		4,031	2.84	
Turnout		141,850	80.90	−1.74
INC gain from Independent		Swing		

=== 2012 (bypoll) ===
2012 by-election: Ramachandrapuram
Party	Candidate	Votes	%	±%
INC	Thota Trimurthulu	77,292	49.93	
YSRCP	Pilli Subhash Chandra Bose	66,573	42.23	
TDP	Chikkala Ramachandra Rao	6,256	4.04	
Majority		4,031	2.84	
Turnout		141,850	80.90	−1.74
INC gain from Independent		Swing		

=== 2014 ===
2014 Andhra Pradesh Legislative Assembly election: Ramachandrapuram
Party	Candidate	Votes	%	±%
TDP	Thota Trimurthulu	85,254	53.24	
YSRCP	Pilli Subhash Chandra Bose	68,332	42.67	
Majority		16,922	10.57	
Turnout		160,133	88.17	+7.27
TDP gain from YSRCP		Swing		

=== 2019 ===
2019 Andhra Pradesh Legislative Assembly election: Ramachandrapuram
Party	Candidate	Votes	%	±%
YSRCP	Chelluboyina Srinivasa Venugopalakrishna	75,365	44.62	
TDP	Thota Trimurthulu	70,197	41.56	
JSP	Chandrasekhar Polisetty	18,529	10.97	
Majority		5,168	3.06	
Turnout		168,891		
YSRCP gain from TDP		Swing		

=== 2024 ===
2024 Andhra Pradesh Legislative Assembly election: Ramachandrapuram
Party	Candidate	Votes	%	±%
TDP	Vasamsetti Subhash	97,652	55.68	
YSRCP	Pilli Surya Prakash	71,361	40.69	
INC	Kota Srinivasa Rao	1,173	0.67	
NOTA	None Of The Above	1,608	0.92	
Majority		26,291	14.99	
Turnout		1,75,388		
TDP gain from YSRCP		Swing		

== See also ==
- List of constituencies of the Andhra Pradesh Legislative Assembly
