= S. Savitha =

Indian politician

Sanjeevareddygari Savitha
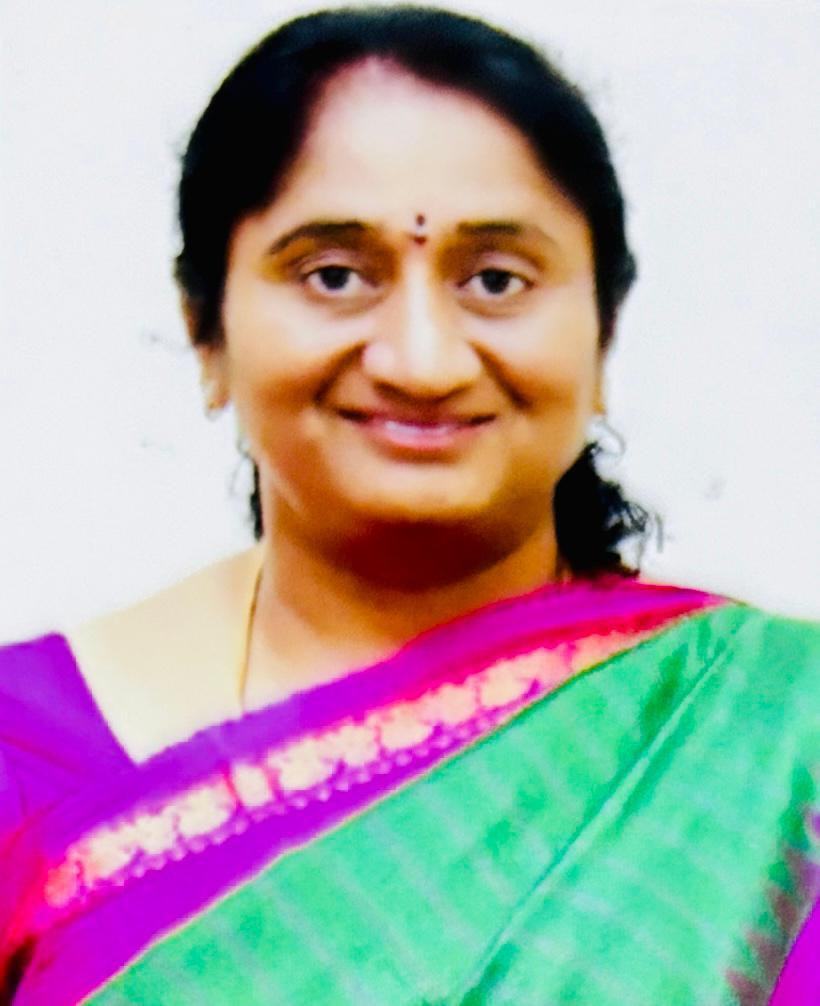

Minister of Backward Classes Welfare Government of Andhra Pradesh
- Incumbent
- Assumed office 12 June 2024
- Governor: S. Abdul Nazeer
- Chief Minister: N. Chandrababu Naidu
- Preceded by: Chelluboyina Srinivasa Venugopalakrishna

Minister of Economically Weaker Sections Welfare Government of Andhra Pradesh
- Incumbent
- Assumed office 12 June 2024
- Governor: S. Abdul Nazeer
- Chief Minister: N. Chandrababu Naidu
- Preceded by: Office established

Minister of Handlooms & Textiles Government of Andhra Pradesh
- Incumbent
- Assumed office 12 June 2024
- Governor: S. Abdul Nazeer
- Chief Minister: N. Chandrababu Naidu
- Preceded by: Y. S. Jagan Mohan Reddy (Chief Minister)

Member of Legislative Assembly Andhra Pradesh
- Incumbent
- Assumed office 4 June 2024
- Preceded by: Malagundla Sankaranarayana
- Constituency: Penukonda

Sanjeevareddygari Savitha (born 10 February 1977) is an Indian politician from Andhra Pradesh. She is a first-time MLA from Penukonda Assembly constituency in Sri Sathya Sai district. She represents Telugu Desam Party. She won the 2024 Andhra Pradesh Legislative Assembly election. In June 2024, she was inducted into the Fourth N. Chandrababu Naidu ministry.

== Early life and education ==
She was born in Penukonda in the erstwhile Anantapur district to Somandepalli Ramachandra Reddy. She completed her Bachelor of Arts in 1998 at Sri Krishnadevaraya University, Anantapur.

== Career ==
Savitha won the 2024 Andhra Pradesh Legislative Assembly election from Penukonda Assembly constituency representing Telugu Desam Party. She polled 1,13,832 votes and defeated K. V. Ushashri Charan of YSR Congress Party by a margin of 33,388 votes. She was given the portfolio of B.C. Welfare, economically weaker sections welfare, handlooms and textiles in the cabinet of Chandrababu Naidu.
