= B. Anjanappa =

Indian politician

Member of Parliament, Lok Sabha
- In office 1957-1971
- Preceded by: Bezawada Ramachandra Reddy
- Succeeded by: Doddav Arapukamakshiah
- Constituency: Nellore

Personal details
- Born: 1 June 1918 Madakasira, Anantapur district, Madras Presidency, British India(present-day Andhra Pradesh, India)
- Died: 9 June 1980
- Party: Indian National Congress
- Spouse: Rukmini Devi

B. Anjanappa was an Indian politician. He was a Member of Parliament, representing Nellore in the Lok Sabha, the lower house of India's Parliament, as a member of the Indian National Congress.
