= Pamudurthi Bayapa Reddy =

Indian politician

Member of Parliament, Lok Sabha
- In office 1971–1984
- Preceded by: N. Sanjiva Reddy
- Succeeded by: K. Ramachandra Reddy
- Constituency: Hindupur, Andhra Pradesh

Personal details
- Born: 3 March 1920 Pamudurthi Village, Anantapur District, Madras Presidency, British India
- Party: Indian National Congress

Pamudurthi Bayapa Reddy was an Indian politician. He was a Member of Parliament, representing Hindupur, Andhra Pradesh in the Lok Sabha the lower house of India's Parliament as a member of the Indian National Congress.
