= Beerendra Keshava Tarakananda Puri =

Beerendra Keshava Tarakananda Puri is the first pontiff of the Kaginele Kanaka Guru Peetha, the cultural and spiritual centre of Kuruba Gowdas of Karnataka, India. He is said to have started many educational institutions and schools to help the rural poor acquire education.

In 2005, Beerendra Keshava Tarakananda Puri was felicitated to mark the 13th anniversary of his ascending the peetha, at a convention attended by about 50,000 people. After his demise, the rotational system among four swamijis for five years period has decided. Sri Niranjanananda Puri succeeded him as the first new head of the Mutt.
