= Perumalapalli =

Village in Krishnagiri district, Tamil Nadu, India

Coordinates: 12°48′30″N 77°55′03″E

Perumalapalli is a small village of Nandimangalam Panchayat in Hosur taluk and municipality in Krishnagiri district in the Indian state of Tamil Nadu. It is located about 18 kilometres (12 mi) east of Hosur, 40 kilometres (25 mi) south east of Bangalore, 48 kilometres (30 mi) north east of Krishnagiri, the district headquarters and 306 kilometres (190 mi) west of Chennai, the state capital.
