= Palle Raghunatha Reddy =

Indian politician

Minister of Information & Public Relations, Information Technology & Communications, Non-Resident Indian Empowerment and Relations, Telugu Language & Culture, Minority Welfare & Empowerment Government of Andhra Pradesh
- In office 8 June 2014 – 1 April 2017
- Governor: E. S. L. Narasimhan
- Chief Minister: N. Chandrababu Naidu
- Preceded by: President's Rule
- Succeeded by: Nara Lokesh

Member of Legislative Council Andhra Pradesh
- In office 2007 - 2009
- Chairman: A. Chakrapani
- Deputy Chairman: Mohammed Jani
- Leader of the House: Y. S. Rajasekhara Reddy
- Constituency: Anantapur

Member of Legislative Assembly Andhra Pradesh
- In office 2009 - 2019
- Preceded by: Constituency Established
- Succeeded by: Duddukunta Sudhakar Reddy
- Constituency: Puttaparthi
- In office 1999 - 2004
- Preceded by: T. D. Nagaraja Reddy
- Succeeded by: Kadapala Mohan Reddy
- Constituency: Nallamada

Personal details
- Party: Telugu Desam Party
- Occupation: Politician

Palle Raghunatha Reddy is a politician from Andhra Pradesh. He is a two-time Member of the Legislative Assembly representing the Nallamada and Puttaparthi constituencies for the Telugu Desam Party winning in 1999 and 2014 elections. He also served as Information Technology minister.

== Personal life ==
Reddy hails from Puttaparthi, Anantapur District., Palle Raghunath Reddy is the chairman of the P.V.K.K. Institute of Technology and Sri Balaji Education Society, Anantapur.

== Career ==
Reddy was first elected in 1999 assembly elections from the Nallamada constituency in Anantapur district. He later served as Chief Government Whip but encountered serious opposition from inside the party. In 2007, he was elected to the Legislative Council.

He along with Nara Chandra Babu launched AP Cloud Initiative at Visakhapatnam.

Later, he won the 2009 Andhra Pradesh Legislative Assembly Election defeating Kadapala Mohan Reddy of Indian National Congress by a margin of 1,021 votes. He won again in 2014 Andhra Pradesh Legislative Assembly Election defeating Chinthapanti Somasekhara Reddy of YSR Congress Party by a margin of 6,964 votes.
