= Kuruva Gorantla Madhav =

Member of the 17th Lok Sabha

Member of Parliament, Lok Sabha
- In office 24 May 2019 – 04 June 2024
- Preceded by: Kristappa Nimmala
- Succeeded by: B K Parthasarathi
- Constituency: Hindupur

Personal details
- Born: 1 June 1969 (age 56) Rudravaram, Kurnool District, Andhra Pradesh
- Party: YSRCP
- Spouse: Smt Savitha
- Children: 3

Kuruva Gorantla Madhav (born 1 June 1969) is a politician from Andhra Pradesh. He won the Hindupur seat in the Indian general election, 2019 as a YSR Congress Party candidate. His parents are K Madhava Swamy and K Ramulamma. Earlier, he worked as a Circle Inspector in the Kadiri.

== Career ==
Madhav worked as general secretary of Anantapur police union. In September 2018, J. C. Diwakar Reddy and his followers fought against probhodananda swami of Tadipatri. At that time police department failed to maintain law and order in Tadipatri. For this J. C. Diwakar Reddy blamed DSP and police department of Anantapur for their failure. To counter this Madhav warned J. C. Diwakar Reddy for his harsh comments on police department. At that time he was the circle inspector for Kadiri urban

With this Gorantla Madhav becomes famous in Anantapur and also in the state. At end of December 2018, he applied for VRS with interest in politics. He entered into politics by joining YSR Congress Party in January 2019. Surprisingly On March 16 2019, Y. S. Jaganmohan Reddy announced him as YSR Congress Party candidate for Hindupur. But his VRS was rejected by AP police department Then he went to both AP tribunal court and High court for Justice got successful in his efforts and relieved with immediate effect. And on results day, he won as MP of Hindupur, with majority of 140748, by defeating Kristappa Nimmala of Telugu Desam Party.
