= B. K. Parthasarathi =

Indian politician

Member of Parliament, Lok Sabha
- Incumbent
- Assumed office 2024
- Preceded by: Kuruva Gorantla Madhav
- Constituency: Hindupur
- In office 1999–2004
- Preceded by: S. Gangadhar
- Succeeded by: G. Nizamuddin
- Constituency: Hindupur

Member of Legislative Assembly, Andhra Pradesh
- In office 2009–2019
- Preceded by: Paritala Sunitha
- Succeeded by: Malagundla Sankaranarayana
- Constituency: Penukonda

Personal details
- Born: 3 September 1959 (age 66) Roddam, Anantapur
- Party: Telugu Desam Party
- Spouse: B. K. Kalavathi
- Children: 6
- Parents: B. K. Nanjaiah (father); B. K. Sanjeevamma (mother)
- Education: Bangalore University (B.A.)
- Occupation: Politician

B. K. Parthasarathi is an Andhra Pradesh politician. He is the leader of the Telugu Desam Party and has won twice as an MLA from the Penukonda constituency. He won from Hindupur in the 2024 Indian general election.

== Career ==
Parthasarathi entered politics by becoming Zilla Parishad chairman of the Anantapur district in 1996. In 1999, TDP offered him the MP seat of Hindupur and he won with a majority of 134,636, defeating S. Gangadhar of the Congress Party.

In the 2004 Loksabha elections, he was defeated by G. Nizamuddin with a narrow margin of 1,840 votes.

In the 2009 election, he contested as an MLA candidate from Penukonda and won in a triangular fight by 14,385 votes, defeating K T Sreedhar of Congress Party.

In the 2014 elections, he again won by defeating Malagundla Sankaranarayana, of YSR Congress Party. In 2019, Malagundla Sankaranarayana defeated him by a wide margin.

He became a Tirumala Tirupati Devasthanams board member in April 2018. He became district Telugu Desam Party president in 2009.
