= Malagundla Sankaranarayana =

Indian politician

Minister for Roads & Buildings Government of Andhra Pradesh
- In office 22 July 2020 – 7 April 2022
- Governor: Biswabhusan Harichandan
- Chief Minister: Y. S. Jagan Mohan Reddy
- Preceded by: Dharmana Krishna Das
- Succeeded by: Dadisetti Ramalingeswara Rao

Minister of Backward Classes Welfare Government of Andhra Pradesh
- In office 8 June 2019 – 21 July 2020
- Governor: E. S. L. Narasimhan; Biswabhusan Harichandan
- Chief Minister: Y. S. Jagan Mohan Reddy
- Preceded by: Atchannaidu Kinjarapu
- Succeeded by: Chelluboyina Venugopala Krishna

Member of Legislative Assembly Andhra Pradesh
- In office 2019–2024
- Preceded by: B K Parthasarathi
- Succeeded by: S. Savitha
- Constituency: Penukonda

Personal details
- Party: YSR Congress Party
- Occupation: Politician

Malagundla Sankaranarayana is a former cabinet minister from Andhra Pradesh, India. He is a leader of the YSR Congress party. He won as MLA from Penukonda constituency of Anantapur district.

== Career ==
Sankaranarayana began his political entry by joining Telugu Desam Party in 1995. He became Municipal councillor of Dharmavaram in 2005. He joined YSR Congress Party in 2011. In 2014 assembly elections he contested from Penukonda seat was defeated by B K Parthasarathi of TDP, with 17,415 margin. But in 2019 elections he was elected as an MLA and got cabinet minister post. He is serving as minister for BC welfare. He is continuing as Anantapur district YSRCP president since 2012. On 22 July 2020 he has been allotted the Roads and Buildings department in Cabinet reshuffle. In April 2022 he was dropped from Cabinet during reshuffle. Later he was appointed YSRCP Sri Sathya Sai district chief.
