= Chelluboyina Venugopala Krishna =

Indian politician (born 1962)

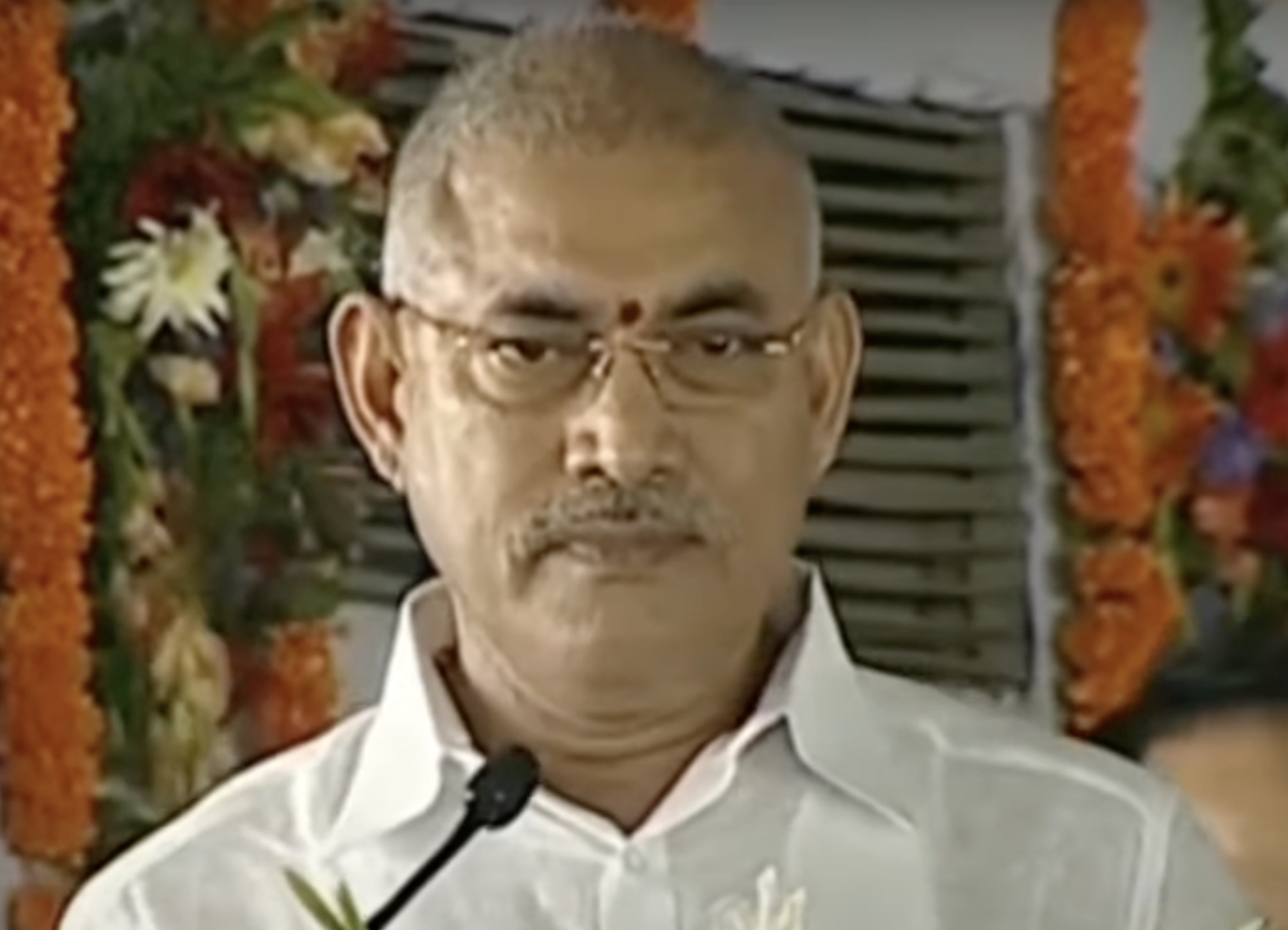
- Chelluboyina in April 2022

Minister of Information & Public Relations and Cinematography
- Incumbent
- Assumed office 11 April 2022 - 3 June 2024
- Governor: Biswabhusan Harichandan; S. Abdul Nazeer
- Chief Minister: Y. S. Jagan Mohan Reddy
- Preceded by: Perni Nani
- Succeeded by: Kolusu Parthasarathy

Minister of Backward Classes Welfare
- In office 29 July 2020 – 10 April 2022
- Governor: Biswabhusan Harichandan; S. Abdul Nazeer
- Chief Minister: Y. S. Jagan Mohan Reddy
- Preceded by: Malagundla Sankaranarayana

Member of Legislative Assembly Andhra Pradesh
- In office 8 June 2019 - 3 June 2024
- Preceded by: Thota Trimurthulu
- Succeeded by: Vasamsetti Subhash
- Constituency: Ramachandrapuram

Personal details
- Born: 23 December 1962 (age 63) Razole mandal, Andhra Pradesh, India
- Party: YSR Congress Party
- Other political affiliations: Indian National Congress
- Children: 2
- Occupation: Politician; businessman

Chelluboyina Srinivasa Venugopala Krishna (born 23 December 1962) is an Indian politician and businessman from the state of Andhra Pradesh. He is the Minister of Backward Classes Welfare, Public Relations, Information and Cinematography and is elected as the Member of the Legislative Assembly (MLA) representing Ramachandrapuram Assembly constituency on behalf of YSR Congress Party. He started his political career in 2000 with Indian National Congress and was elected as a member of Zilla Parishad in 2001 and 2006.

== Early life ==
Chelluboyina was born on 23 December 1962 to Chelluboyina Venkanna and Subhadramma in Adavi Palem, Razole mandal in East Godavari district (now in Konaseema district), Andhra Pradesh. He graduated in Bachelor of Arts from B. R. Ambedkar Open University.

== Career ==
Chelluboyina is a businessman by profession. He entered politics in 2000 and joined Indian National Congress. He was elected as a member of Zilla Parishad (district council) from Razole in 2001, and again in 2006 and was made the Chairman. He was appointed president of East Godavari district's Congress unit in 2008 and again 2012. He worked as a member of Pradesh Congress Committee in united Andhra Pradesh. He also worked as a member of Andhra Pradesh Pollution Control Board.

He joined YSR Congress Party (YSRCP) and contested the 2014 Andhra Pradesh Legislative Assembly election representing Kakinada Rural Assembly constituency unsuccessfully. He later contested the 2019 Andhra Pradesh Legislative Assembly election from Ramachandrapuram constituency and won as the MLA. In July 2020, he was inducted into the ministry Y. S. Jagan Mohan Reddy-led YSRCP government and was allotted the portfolio of Backward Classes Welfare. He was also appointed the in-charge minister for East Godavari district. In April 2022, he was given additional ministries of Public Relations, Information and Cinematography.

== Other work ==
Chelluboyina acts as the president of AP Boxing Association since 1999.

== Personal life ==
Chelluboyina is married to Varalakshmi and has two sons.
