= S. Gangadhar =

Indian politician (born 1949)

Sanipalli Gangadhar (born 12 October 1949, in Munimadugu, Anantapur district, Andhra Pradesh) is a leader of Indian National Congress from Andhra Pradesh. He served as member of the Lok Sabha representing Hindupur (Lok Sabha constituency), and was elected to 9th, 10th and 12th Lok Sabha.
