= G. Nizamuddin =

Indian politician

Member of parliament
- Constituency: Hindupur

Personal details
- Born: 1 July 1954 (age 71) Kadiri, Andhra Pradesh
- Party: YSR Congress Party
- Spouse: Shamshad Begum
- Children: 1 son and 2 daughters
- As of 12 May, 2006

G. Nizamuddin (born 1 July 1954) was a member of the 14th Lok Sabha of India. He represented the Hindupur constituency of Andhra Pradesh and was a member of the Indian National Congress and joined YSR Congress Party on 4 April 2019 to see his political guru Y. S. Rajasekhara Reddy 's son Y.S. Jaganmohan Reddy as Chief Minister of Andhra Pradesh.
