= Andhra cuisine =

Culinary tradition

Andhra cuisine is the traditional culinary style of the Telugu people, who are native to the Indian state of Andhra Pradesh. It is generally known for its tangy, hot, and spicy taste.

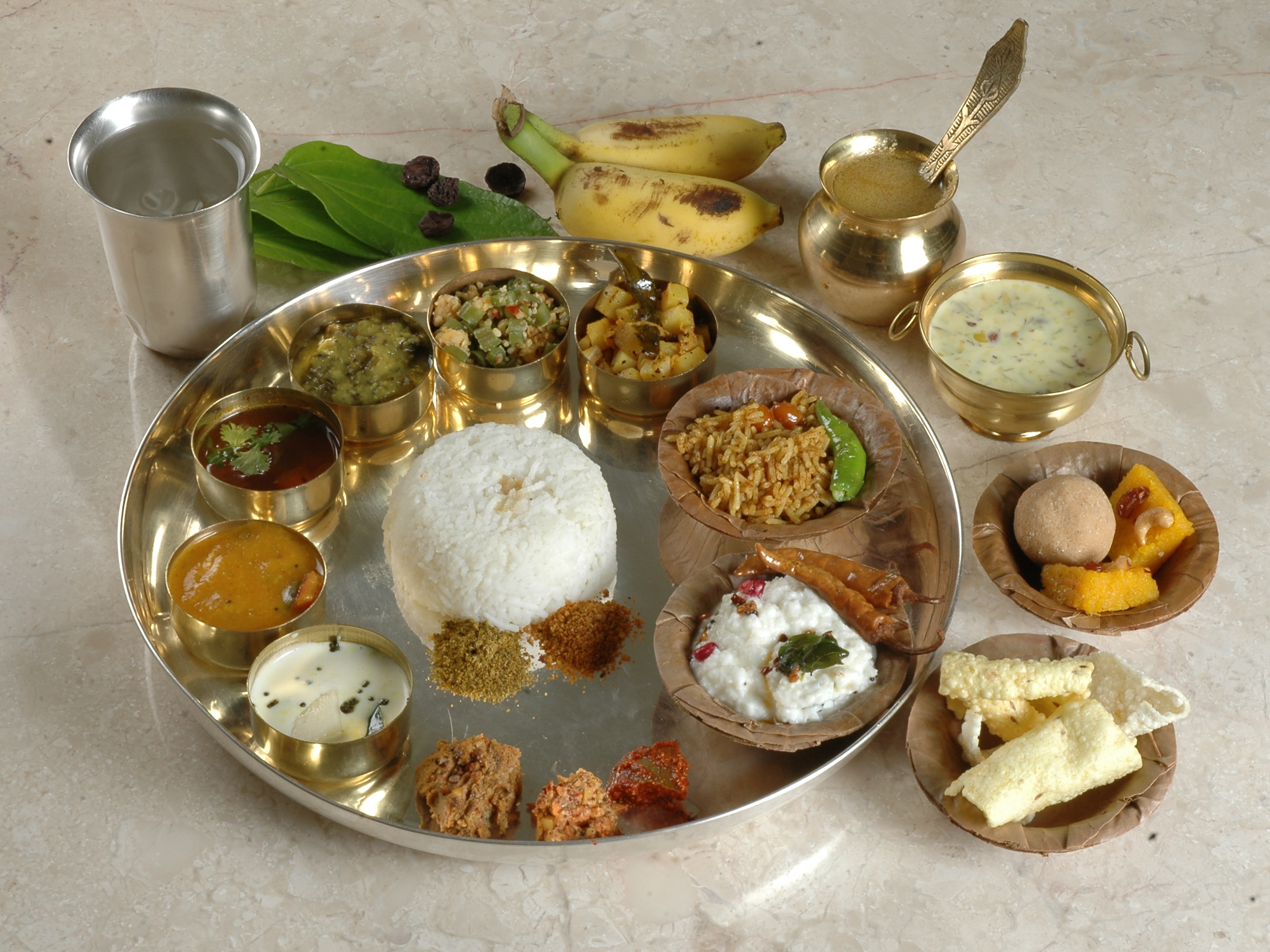
Andhra bhojanam (meal)

== Staple foods ==
Andhra cuisine relies on a diverse varieties of agricultural produce, but rice is central staple food of the region, forming the base around which daily meals are structured. Rather than being eaten as standalone dishes, most preparations are designed to be mixed into or served alongside steamed rice.

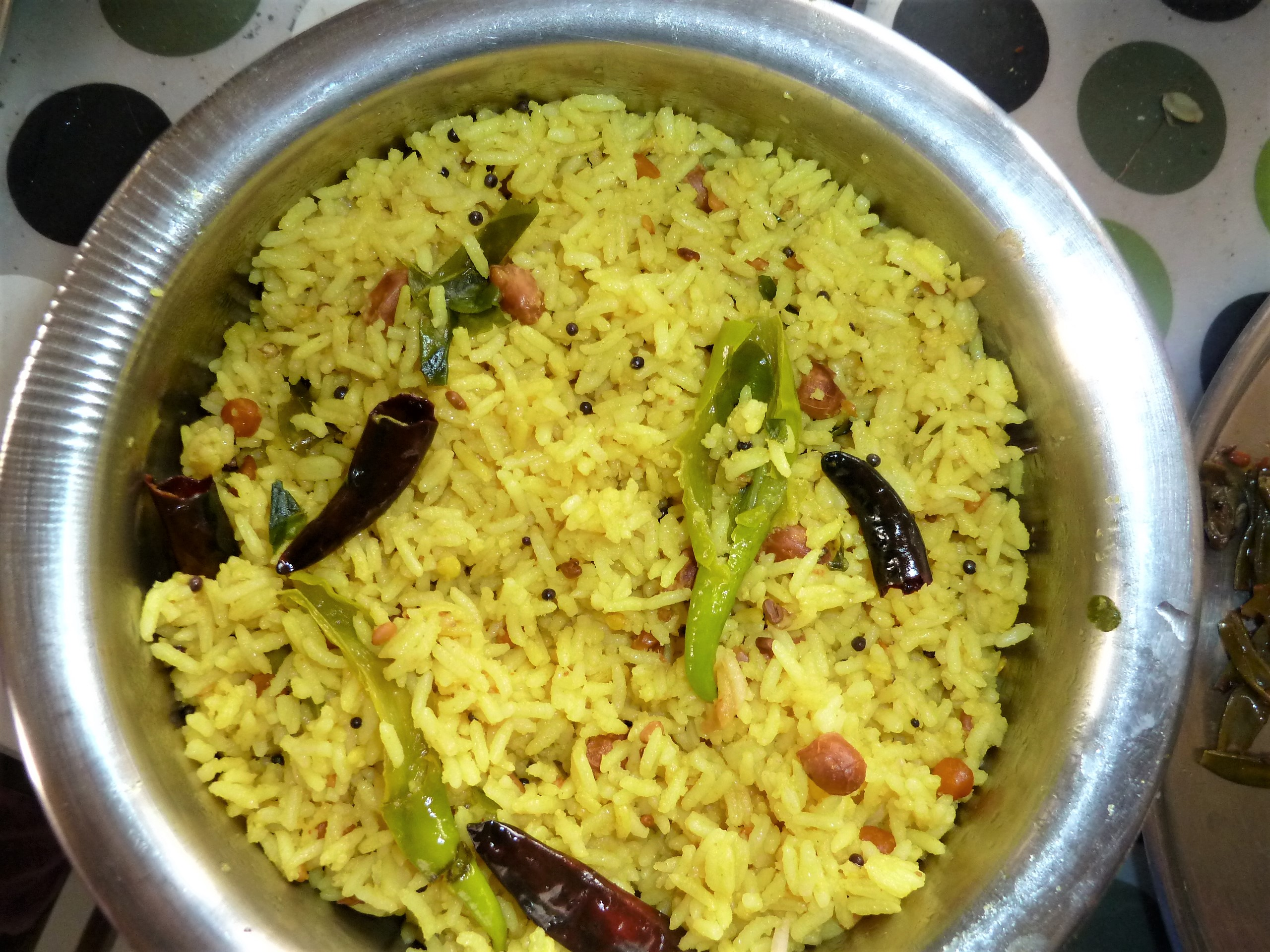
Pulihora

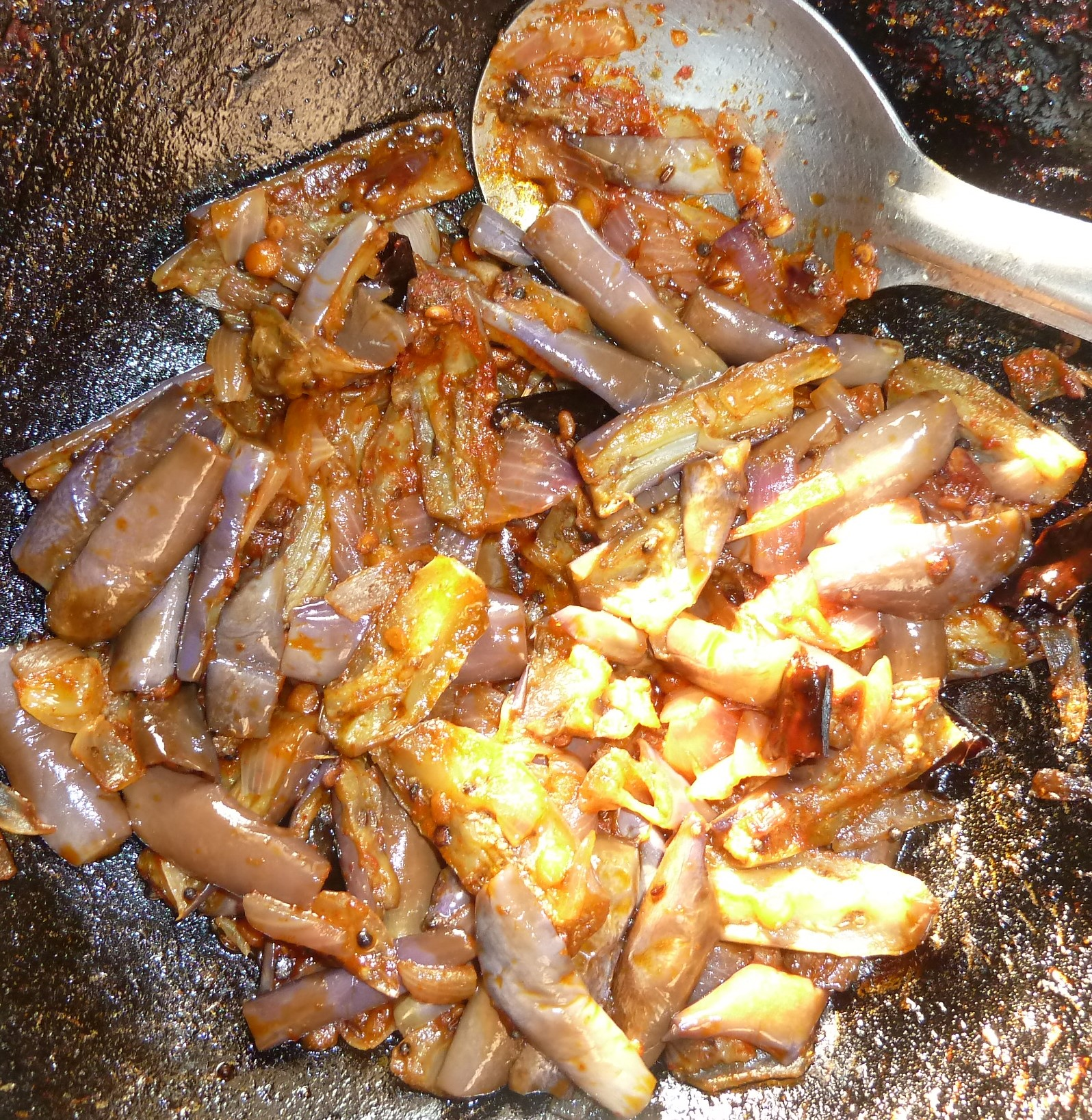
Brinjal with onion curry

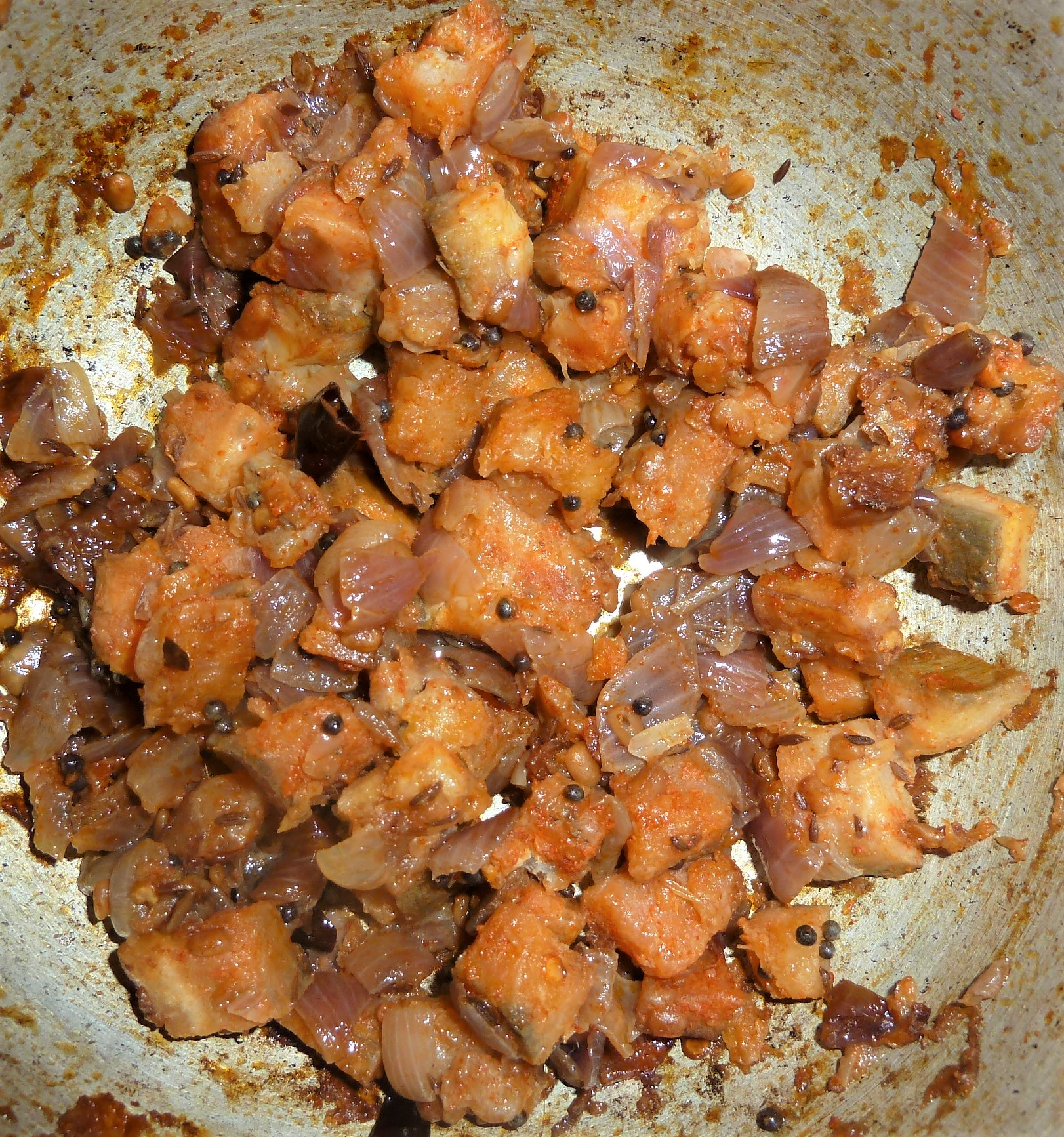
Banana with onion curry

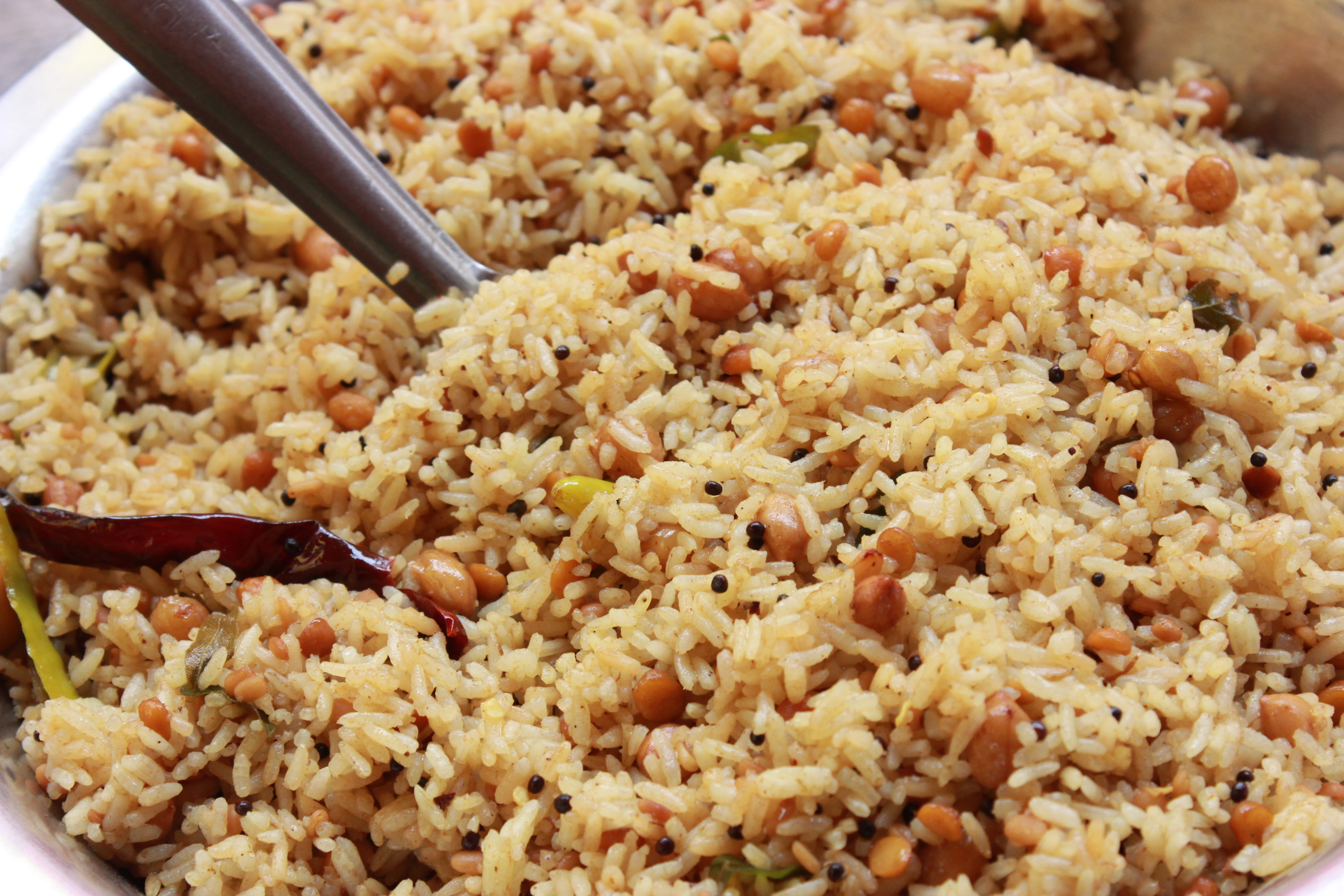
Pulihora, a sour tamarind-based fried rice dish from Andhra Pradesh

=== Koora ===
Koora (కూర), a word for a curry. Koora dishes are named for the ingredients used and the method of preparation. There is also iguru(ఇగురు) which is a type of curry where most of the moisture evaporates, leaving mainly the cooking oil. Additional methods include:

- Vepudu(వేపుడు)(fry): crispy fried vegetables or sometimes meats, typically including prawns(రొయ్యలు), okra (బెండకాయ), ivy gourd (దొండకాయ), potato (బంగాళాదుంప /ఉర్లగడ్డ), colocasia (చామదుంప), and several additional local vegetables.
- Gujju(గుజ్జు) (gravy): a tomato or coriander seed base into which is added into brinjal (గుత్తి వంకాయ), okra, etc.
- Pulusu(పులుసు) (sour paste or gravy)
  - Pulusu koora/Aava petti koora (stew): boiled vegetables or meats cooked in tamarind sauce and mustard paste. Some varieties include snake gourd (పొట్లకాయ), bottle gourd (సొరకాయ/ఆనపకాయ), okra, pumpkin (గుమ్మడికాయ), country chicken (నాటుకోడి).
- Kaaram petti koora(కారం పెట్టి కూర)/Kaaram podi koora (literally, "dish with curry powder added"): sautéed vegetables cooked with curry powder or paste, served as a solid mass. The vegetables can be stuffed with curry powder or paste and are usually cooked whole.
- Other gravy-based curries are usually made with vegetables cooked in tomato sauce and onion with coriander and cumin powder.

=== Lentil based dishes ===
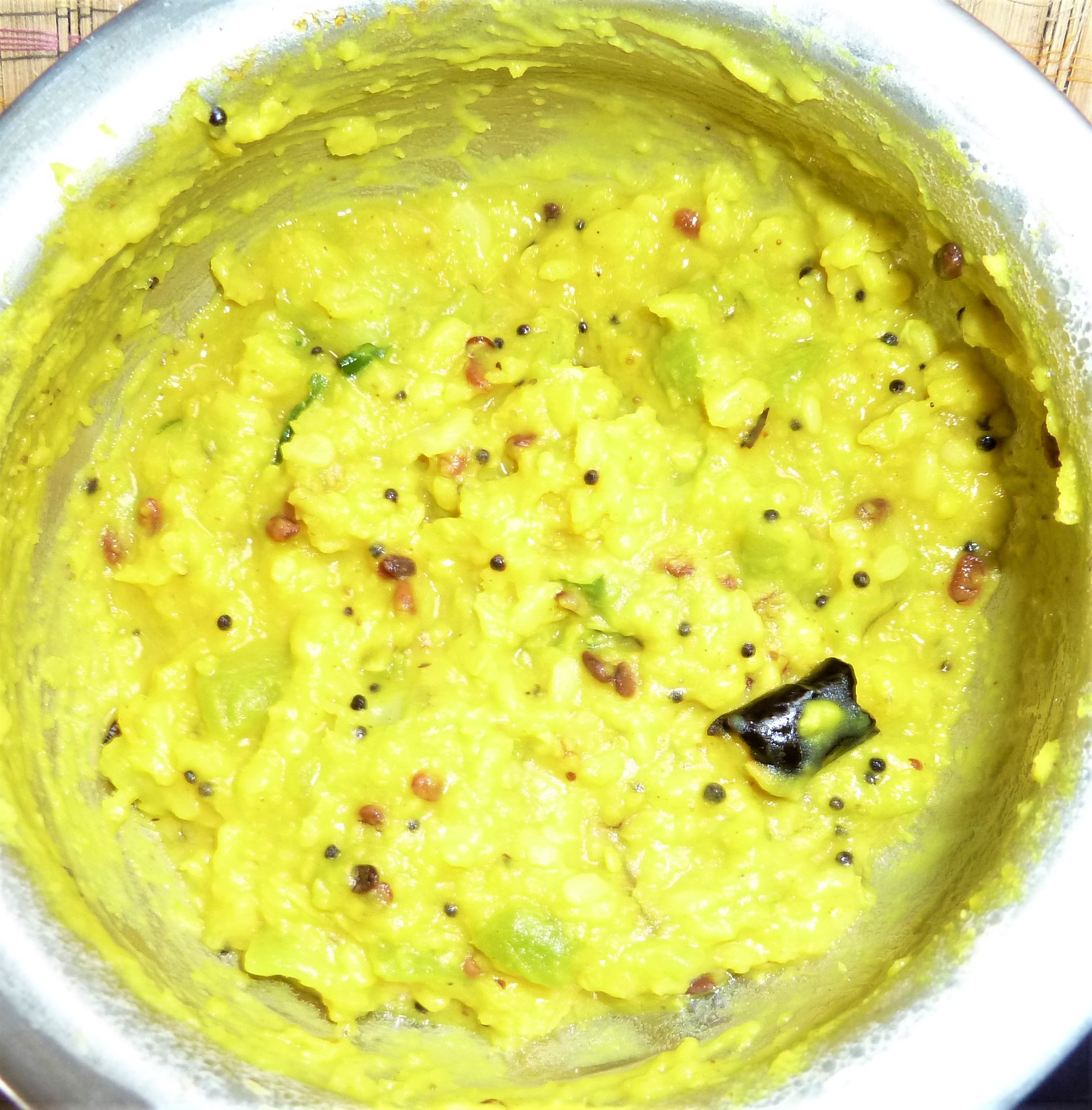
Ridge gourd with moong-dal pappu

Pappu (dal/lentils) dishes include toor daal (kandi pappu) and moong daal (pesara pappu), which are usually cooked with a vegetable or other green. No masala is added to the dal. In some areas, garlic and onion are included in the seasoning, while in others asafetida (hing/inguva) is used. Kandi pappu is often cooked with leafy vegetables such as palakura (spinach), gongura, malabar spinach, and other fruits and vegetables such as tomato, mango, or bottle gourd. Sometimes the cooked version of the dal is replaced with a roasted and ground version, like kandi pachadi (roasted toor daal ground with red chilis), or pesara pachadi (soaked moong daal ground with red or green chilis).

A very popular combination in Andhra is mudda pappu (ముద్ద పప్పు) (plain toor dal cooked with salt) and avakaya.

- Pappu koora(పప్పు కూర) (lentil-based dish): boiled vegetables stir-fried with a small amount of half-cooked lentils (dal).
- Pappucharu(పప్పుచారు) (thick dal broth) or charu
- Charu(చారు) a.k.a. rasam (sour and spicy soup)

=== Pulusu ===
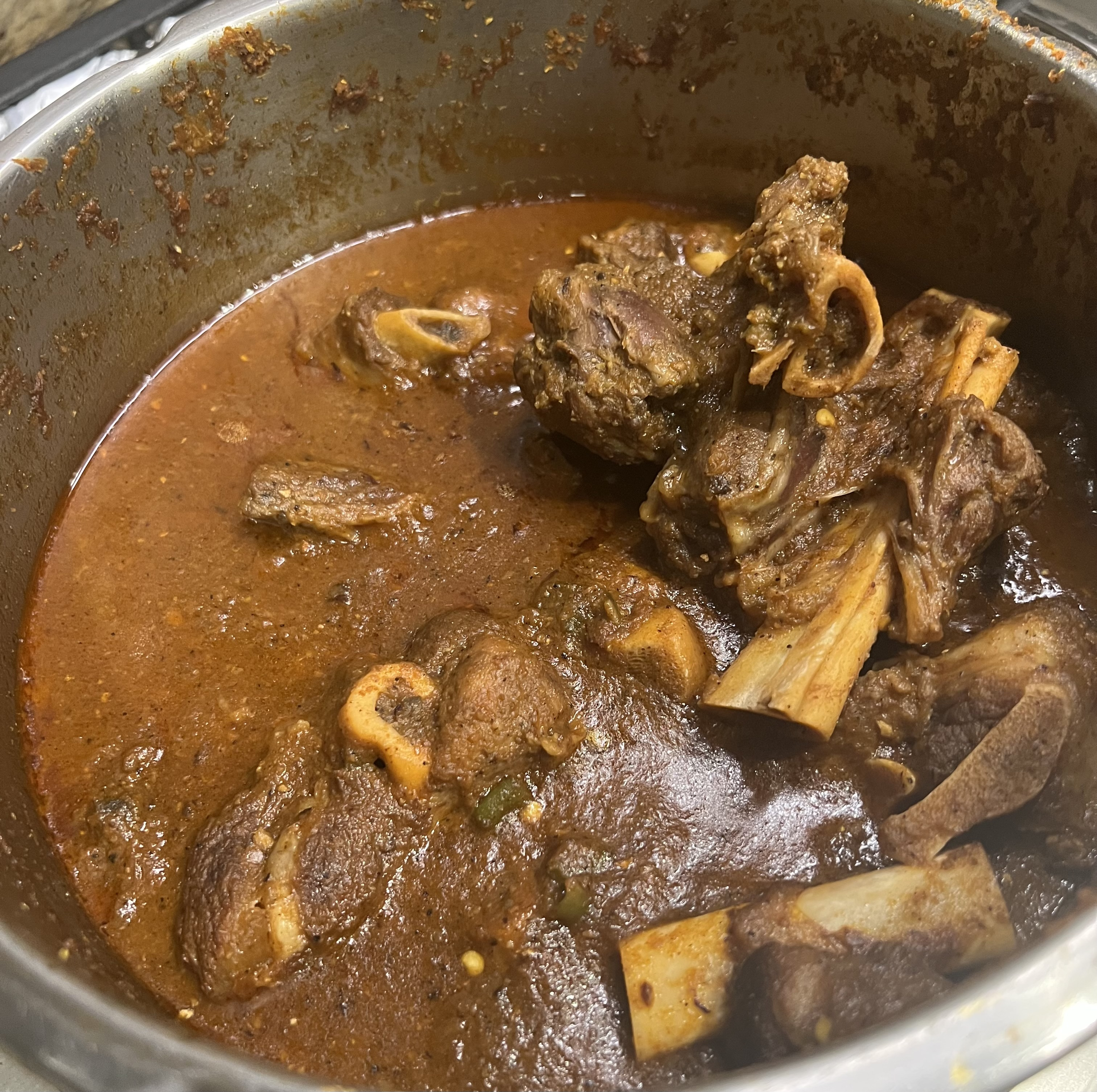
Lamb shanks pulusu (నల్లి బొక్కల పులుసు)

Pulusu (meaning sour) is a curry-like stew that is typically sour and cooked with tamarind paste. Other common bases include tomatoes or mangoes. The mixture can be flavored with mustard, chilis, curry leaves, jaggery, onions, or fenugreek. Fish, chicken, and eggs are typical meat additions. Pachi pulusu is an unheated version of pulusu, typically made of mangoes or tamarind, and eaten during the warmer months.

- Majjiga pulusu (మజ్జిగ పులుసు): sour buttermilk boiled with channa dal and coconut paste
- Menthi challa/menthi majjiga: sour buttermilk seasoned with ginger or green chili paste and menthi (fenugreek) seeds, then fried in oil
- Mukkala pulusu or Dappalam (ముక్కల పులుసు or దప్పళం): pulusu made with aanapakaya(bottle gourd) and other vegetables
- Chammagadda pulusu (చామగడ్డ పులుసు): pulusu made with colocasia
- Kanda pulusu (కంద పులుసు): pulusu made with yam
- Kanda bachali pulusu: pulusu made with yam and Malabar Spinach
- Gangabayala kura pulusu: pulusu made with purslane
- bendakaya pulusu: pulusu made with okra (Ladies Finger)
- sorakaya pulusu (సొరకాయ పులుసు): pulusu made with Bottle gourd
- Perugu (పెరుగు)(curd): the last dish of the meal, normally eaten along with pachadi or pickles

=== Condiments ===
Pachadi and ooragaya are two broad categories of pickle that are eaten with rice. Pachadi is the Telugu version of chutney, typically made of vegetables/greens/lentils and roasted green or red chilis, using tamarind and sometimes curds as a base. It is prepared fresh and must be consumed within two days due to having a short shelf life. Ooragaya is prepared in massive amounts each season. Preparation includes using large amounts of chili powder, as well as menthi (fenugreek) powder, mustard powder, and groundnut (peanut) oil or sesame or mustard oil. It is either consumed on its own, mixed with rice, or as a side dish with pappu/koora.

- Ooragaya(ఊరగాయ) (pickle, similar to పచ్చడి but with a much longer shelf life): avakaya(mango and mustard powder), gongura, nimmakaya(lime), etc.
- Pachadi(పచ్చడి) (pasty/saucy condiment or chutney): kobbari (coconut), tomato, gongura, dosakaya, gummadikaya, and allam (ginger).
- Podi(పొడి) (powdered dal-based condiment or seasoning): mixed with rice and a spoonful of ghee or sesame oil.

=== Mixed rice dishes ===
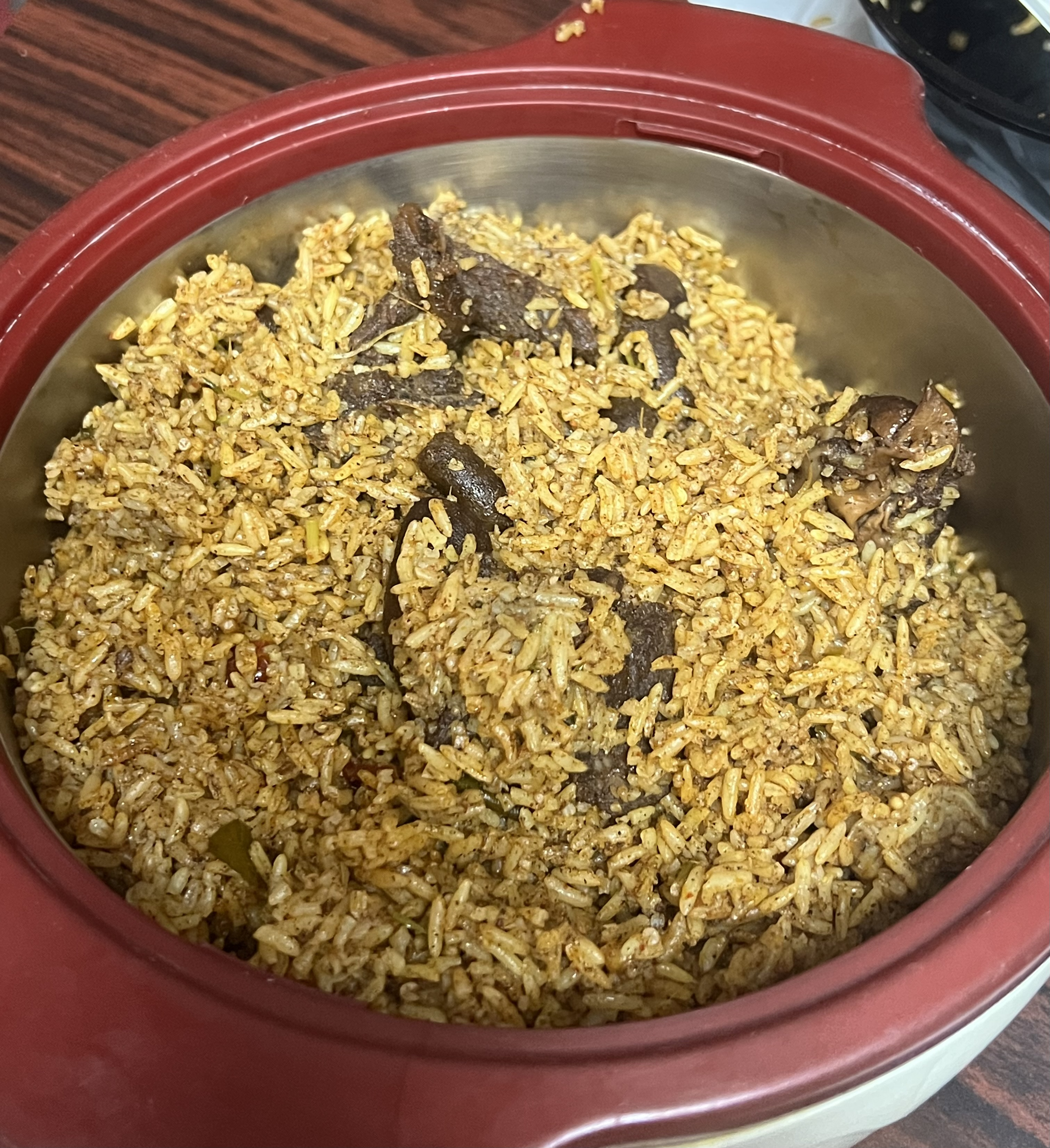
Smoked mutton pulao (దూపుడు గొర్రె పులావ్)

While the predominant method involves mixing rice with various accompaniments at the table. Andhra cuisine also features developed one-pot rice dishes where the rice is cooked directly with the primary flavours.

- Biriyani and Pulaos: These are common entrees in Telugu restaurants and specialized home meals.
- Vegetarian bases: Common bases for vegetarian biryanis and pulaos include jackfruit (పనసపండు), mushroom (పుట్టగొడుగు), brinjals stuffed with spicy gravy (గుత్తి వంకాయ), green chili (పచ్చిమిరపకాయ), red chili (పండుమిరపకాయ), mango pickle (ఆవకాయ), horsegram broth (ఉలవచారు), gongura (గోంగూర), eggs (గుడ్లు) and more.
- Non-Vegetarian bases: Popular options include chickeny, mutton (lamb/chevon), smoked mutton, quails, fish, prawns and crab.

== Regional variations ==
The regions of Coastal Andhra (including Uttarandhra and Dakshinandhra), and Rayalaseema all produce distinctive variations of the Telugu cuisine. Rice is the staple in the irrigated regions of Andhra and Rayalaseema. Ragi (రాగి) is also popular in Rayalaseema and Palnadu. The curries, snacks, and sweets produced in these areas vary in both name and method of preparation from region to region.

Andhra Pradesh is the leading producer of red chili and rice in India. The concentration of red chili production in Andhra Pradesh has led to the liberal use of spices in Andhra cuisine. Vegetarian dishes, as well as meat, and seafood in coastal areas, feature prominently. Tomato pappu, gongura, and tamarind are widely used for cooking curries. Spicy and hot varieties of pickles are also an important part of Andhra cuisine, including avakaya (ఆవకాయ). "Deltaic" cuisine from Guntur in Coastal Andhra is known as the spiciest variety of Andhra cuisine, primarily because of the use of red chilis traditionally grown in the region.

The eating habits of Hindu royals and Brahmins have historically had a heavy influence on Andhra cuisine. Andhra Pradesh's proximity to Western, Central, and Eastern India influenced the diversity of those border regions' cuisine as well, as the Telugu-speaking population spread into neighboring states. Different communities have developed their own variations, and rural areas still follow centuries-old cooking methods and recipes.

=== Coastal Andhra ===
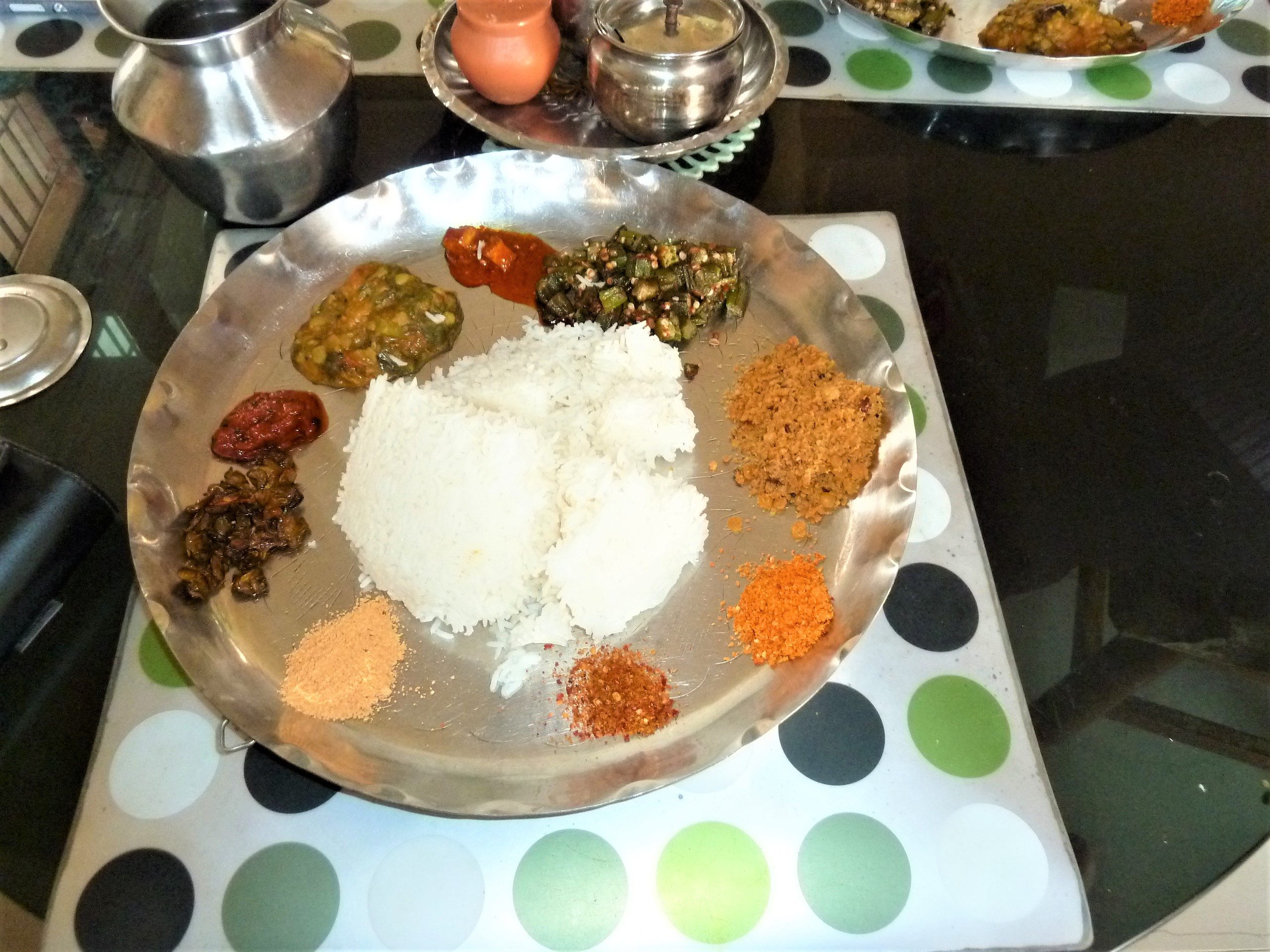
A typical vegetarian meal in Andhra Pradesh

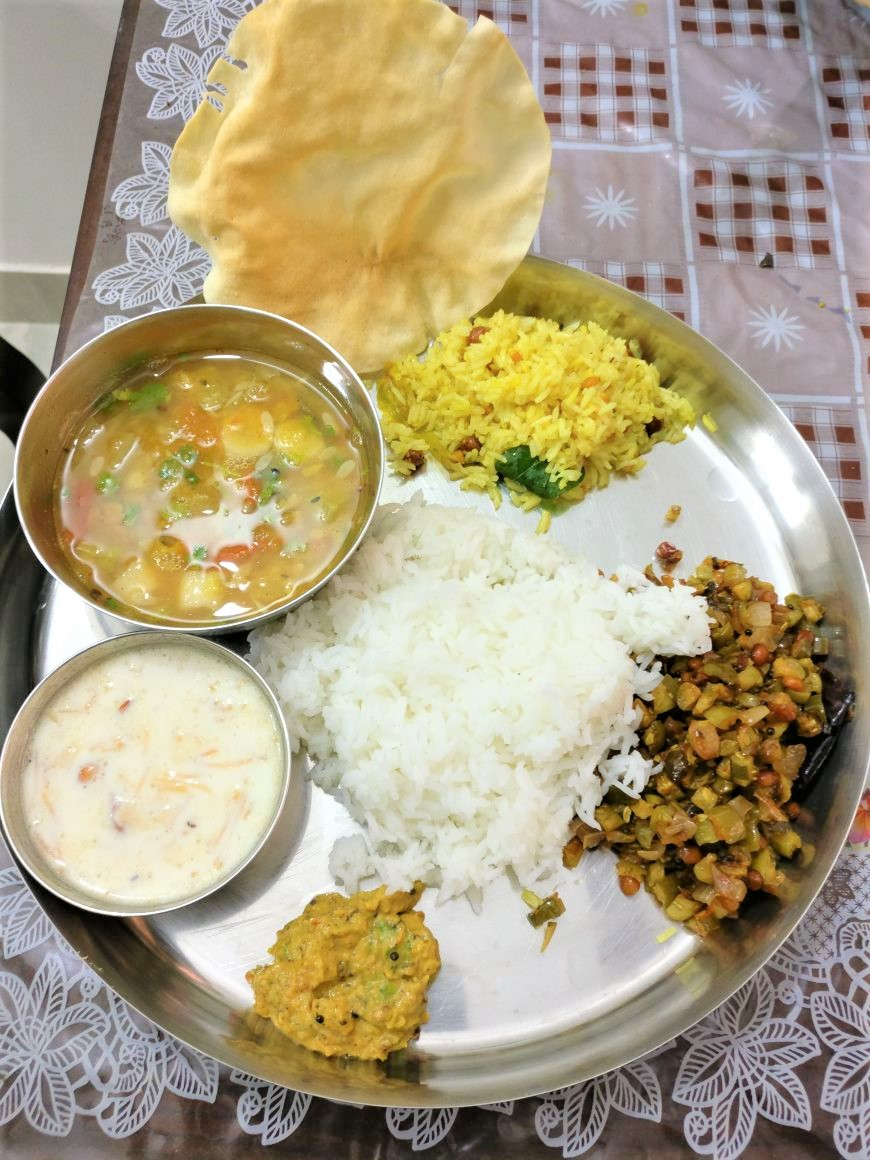
Vegetarian meal for a special occasion

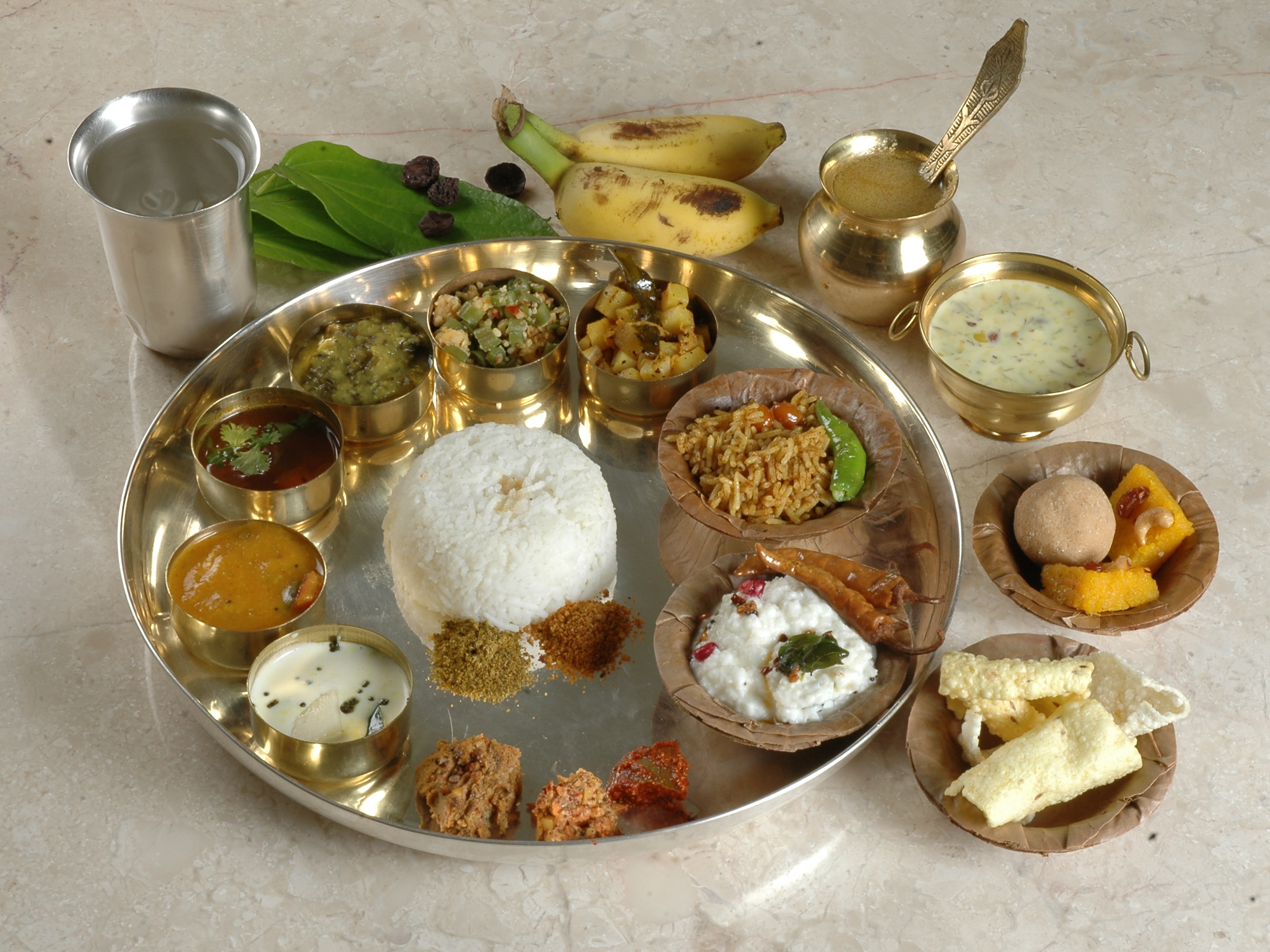
A vegetarian Andhra meal served on important occasions

Coastal Andhra is dominated by the Krishna and Godavari river delta regions and is adjacent to the Bay of Bengal. This proximity to water has led to rice, lentils, and seafood becoming dietary staples in the region. Andhra cuisine has its own variations, but dishes are predominantly rice-based. The Nellore region in the south has its own unique recipes, markedly different from those in Uttarandhra. Ulava charu (ఉలవచారు) is a soup made from horse gram, and bommidala pulusu (బొమ్మిడాల పులుసు) is a seafood stew that is considered a specialty of Andhra Pradesh. Andhra cuisine is prevalent in restaurants all over Andhra Pradesh, as well as in cities like Bangalore, Chennai, and New Delhi.

The Uttarandhra region is composed of the northeastern districts of Srikakulam, Vizianagaram, and Visakhapatnam in Coastal Andhra. While Visakhapatnam district has a cuisine closer in character to the rest of Andhra's districts, Vizianagaram and Srikakulam cuisine shares less in common with other Andhra regional cuisines. The food of the Uttarandhra region is often sweeter than in other regions of Andhra Pradesh. Lentils are often cooked in jaggery, a dish referred to as bellam pappu (బెల్లం పప్పు) and are usually served with butter and steamed rice.

Vegetables are often cooked in a gravy of menthi kura (మెంతి కూర) (fenugreek seed paste), avapettina kura (ఆవపెట్టిన కూర) (mustard seed paste), or nuvvugunda kura (నువ్వుగుండ కూర) (sesame paste). Ullikaram (ఉల్లికారం) is another popular dish in which vegetables or corn seeds are flavored with shallots or onion paste.

Poori (పూరి) and patoli are popular breakfast or festival dishes. Patoli is composed of soaked split black chickpeas (senagapappu (శనగపప్పు) or chana dal) ground to a coarse paste and seasoned with coriander seeds, onions, and sometimes cluster beans (goruchikkudukaya) (గోరుచిక్కుడుకాయ). Upma or uppindi (ఉప్పిండి) coarsely broken rice steamed with vegetables and seeds. This dish is eaten on feast days, when people fast during the day and eat at night. Attu (అట్టు) also called dosa (దోశ) is a standard breakfast in Andhra Pradesh, which may also include coconut or tomato chutneys. Idli (ఇడ్లీ), also known as iddena (ఇడ్డెన), is also very common. Karam podi (కారం పొడి) is a popular curry powder that is served with idli, dosa and upma.

Inguva charu (ఇంగువ చారు) is a sweet-and-sour stew made with tamarind and hing. It can be eaten with rice or uppupindi. Bellam pulusu (బెల్లం పులుసు) is another flavorful, thick, sweet stew made out of rice flour, jaggery, corn cobs, and whole shallots.

The pickles used in Uttarandhra differ from those of other regions of Andhra Pradesh. Avakaya (ఆవకాయ) is a mango pickle which is part of a standard Andhra meal. Pieces of mango are coated with mustard powder, red pepper powder, and salt, then sun-dried, and finally soaked in sesame oil to give the pickle extended shelf life. The result of this process is a darker hue and a sweeter taste than other pickles. This method helps preserve Uttarandhra pickles better amidst the high moisture from the Bay of Bengal coast.

=== Rayalaseema ===
Rayalaseema, in the south of Andhra Pradesh, is well known for the spiciness of its cuisine due to the liberal use of chili powder in almost every dish. Naatu kodi pulusu (నాటు కోడి పులుసు), a spicy country chicken stew, is a classic and highly popular dish in this region. Seema karam (సీమ కారం) is a dish unique to this region. Some of the main courses include rice, jonna (జొన్న) (jowar), ragi roti (రాగి రోటి) with neyyi (నెయ్యి), and raagi sangati (రాగి సంగటి), usually served with spinach or pulusu. Uggani (ఉగ్గాని) is a dish unique to Rayalaseema, especially Ananthapur, Kurnool, and Kadapa districts, as well as in Karnataka, where it is called oggane (ಒಗ್ಗಣೆ). It is made with boiled paddycorn and is generally yellowish in color due to heavy use of turmeric powder. It is usually served with mirapakaya bajji (మిరపకాయ బజ్జి) (chili "bajji"). Uggani bajji (ఉగ్గాని బజ్జి) served primarily as a breakfast dish, but can be eaten as a snack too. It is spicy and a signature dish of Rayalaseema and Eastern Karnataka.

Sweeter dishes of Rayalaseema include ariselu (అరిసెలు) (rice-based vada with jaggery), pakam undalu (పాకం ఉండలు) (a mixture of steamed rice flour, ground nuts, and jaggery), borugu undalu (బొరుగు ఉండలు) (a sweet made of jowar and jaggery), and rava laddoo (రవ్వ లడ్డూ). Masala borugulu (మసాలా బొరుగులు), and ponganaalu (పొంగణాలు) (wet rice flour fried in oil, with carrot, onion, and chilis) are other savory specialties from the region.

=== Telangana ===
Although there is a major overlap in dishes between the Telangana cuisine and the other Telugu cuisines in Andhra Pradesh, the Telangana cuisine has also been influenced by the Hyderabadi cuisine.

In addition to being known for the abundance of millet-based dishes and Gongura-based dishes, Telangana is also known for its high meat consumption, with the state having the highest per capita meat consumption in India.

Some well known vegetarian dishes include jonna rotte (జొన్న రొట్టె) (a high-protein flatbread made with sorghum flour), sarvapindi (సర్వపిండి) (flat circular crispy snack made with rice flour, nuts and spices), pacci pulusu (పచ్చి పులుసు) and more.

Popular nonveg dishes include chicken or mutton haleem, kebabs, various nonveg biryanis and pulaos, Ankapur chicken, natukodi pulusu (నాటుకోడి పులుసు), boti curry (a thick flavorful curry made with the tripe and/or intestines of a goat or sheep) and more.

== Meal structure ==
=== Breakfast ===
A typical Andhra breakfast consists of a few of the items listed below. Usually it consists of idli; garelu, also known as vada, deep-fried lentil dough; or minapattu, also known as dosa, a rice- and lentil-based pancake or crepe. Tea, coffee with milk, or simply milk often accompany these dishes. The most common dishes consumed for breakfast are:

- Idli, urad dal and steamed rice cakes, often eaten with freshly made chutney or with neyyi added and sprinkled with karrap podi (chili dal powder) or chutney and sambar

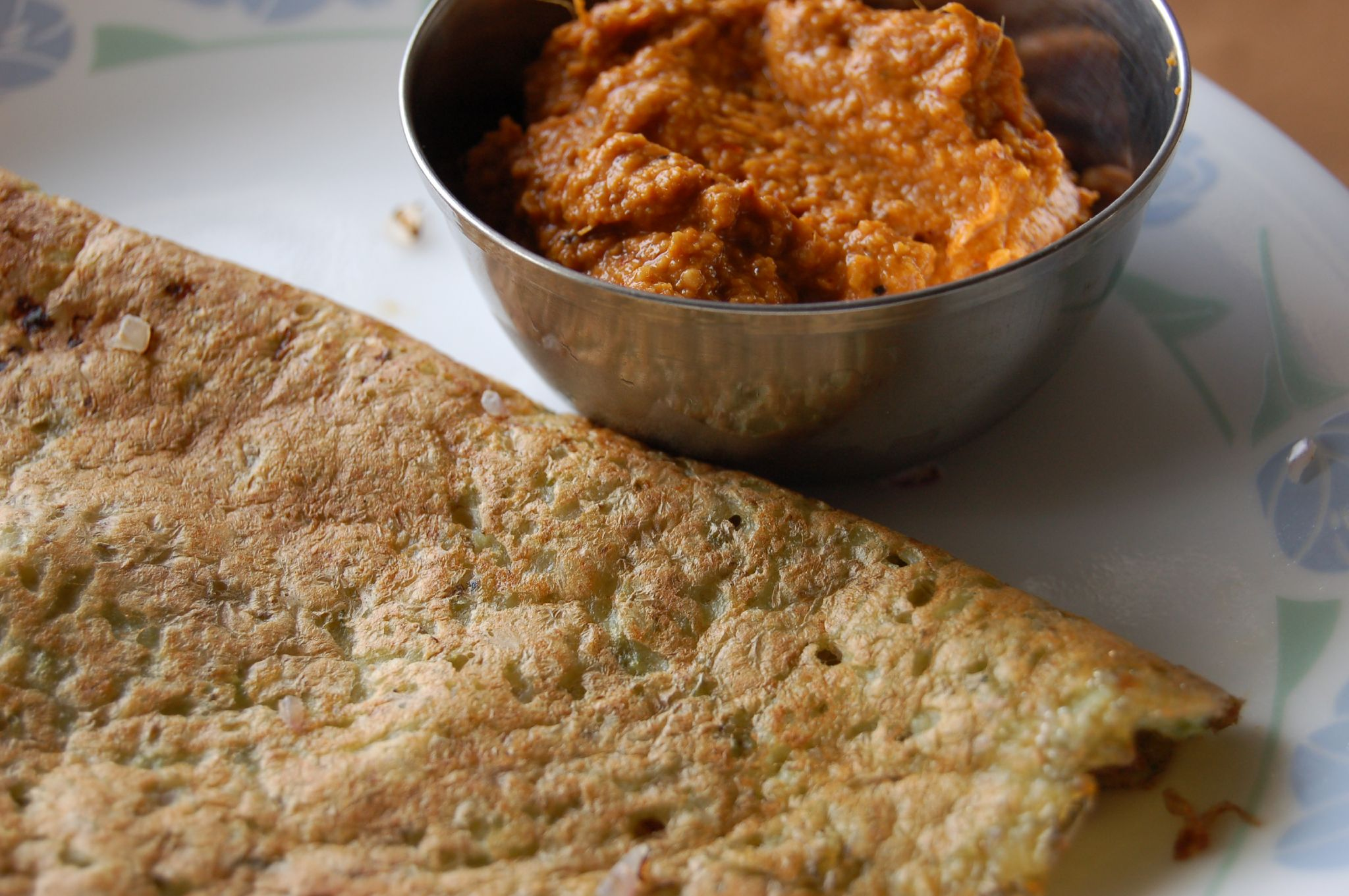
Pesarattu served with ginger pachadi

- Andhra dosa, a rice- and urad dal-based crepe eaten with chutney and sambar
  - Minapattu, a rice- and lentil-based crepe, served with chutney and sambar
  - Pesarattu, a green gram-based crepe. It is usually served with ginger chutney. Sometimes pesarattu is filled with upma, in which case it is known as upma pesarattu.
  - Dibba attu, a deep-fried dosa made with idli batter
  - Atukula dosa, a dosa made from atukulu, also known as poha.
  - Rava dosa or suji dosa, a dosa made with sooji dough with chili, coriander leaves, onion, and pepper.

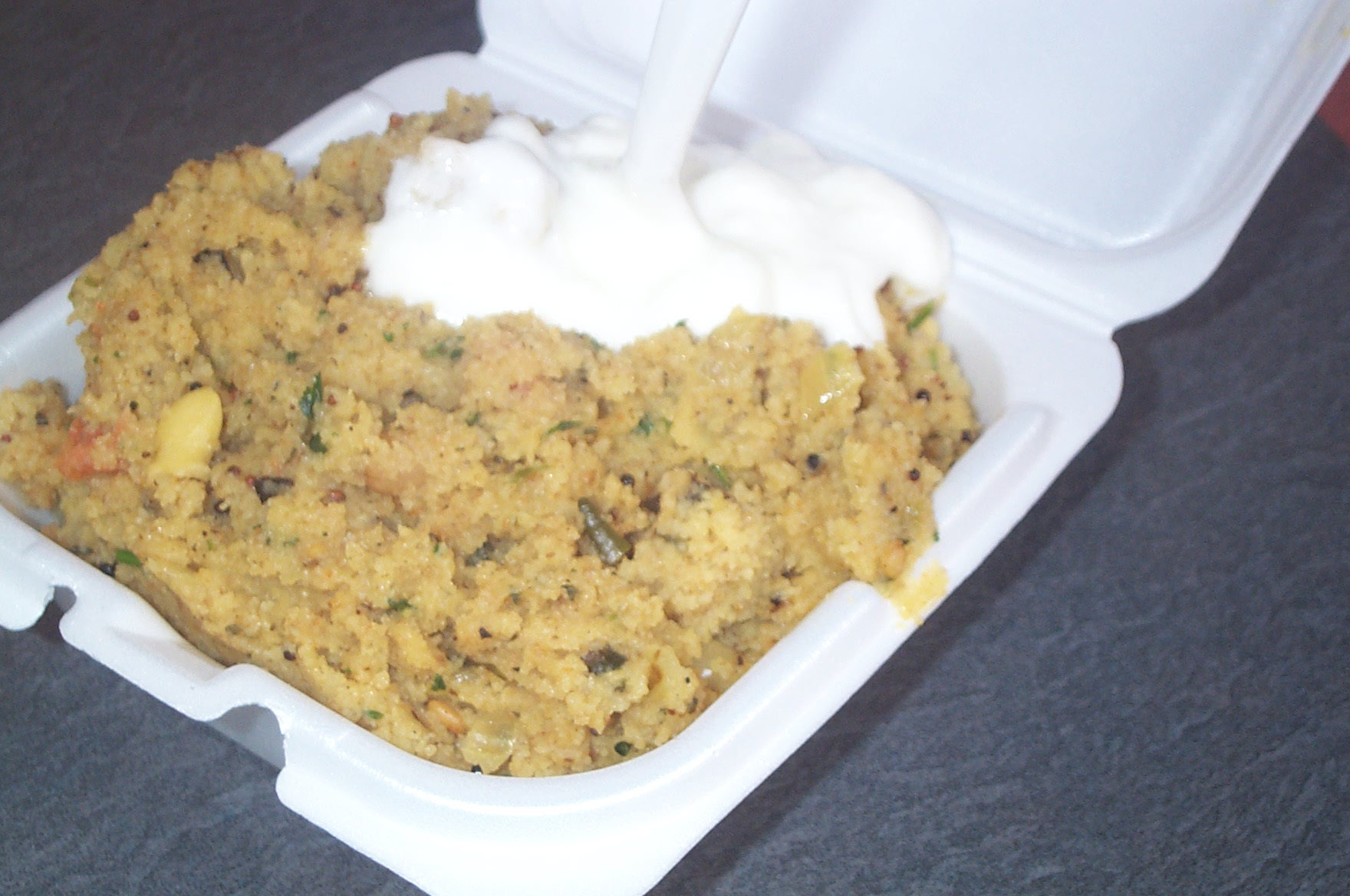
Wheat uppindi (upma) served with curds

- Andhra upma
  - Godhuma uppindi, upma made from broken wheat flour
  - Pesarpindi uppindi, a dry porridge made of green gram flour; commonly served with yoghurt or mango-jaggery pickle
  - Pulusu uppindi, a dry porridge made with rice flour, peanuts, and tamarind extract, and commonly served with yoghurt or mango-jaggery pickle
  - Beeyam rava pesara pappu, literally translated as 'made with broken rice and hulled green gram'; commonly served with yoghurt or mango-jaggery pickle
  - Varipindi uppindi, a dry porridge made with rice flour and hulled green gram; commonly served with yoghurt or mango-jaggery pickle
  - Uppudu pindi or uppindi, also known as upma, a porridge made from broken sooji flour, ghee, and vegetables. It is commonly served with buttermilk or a spicy-savoury powder made from pulses.
  - Saggubiyyam (sago) upma, an upma made from sago (saboodana)
  - Semiya upma, an upma made with vermicelli

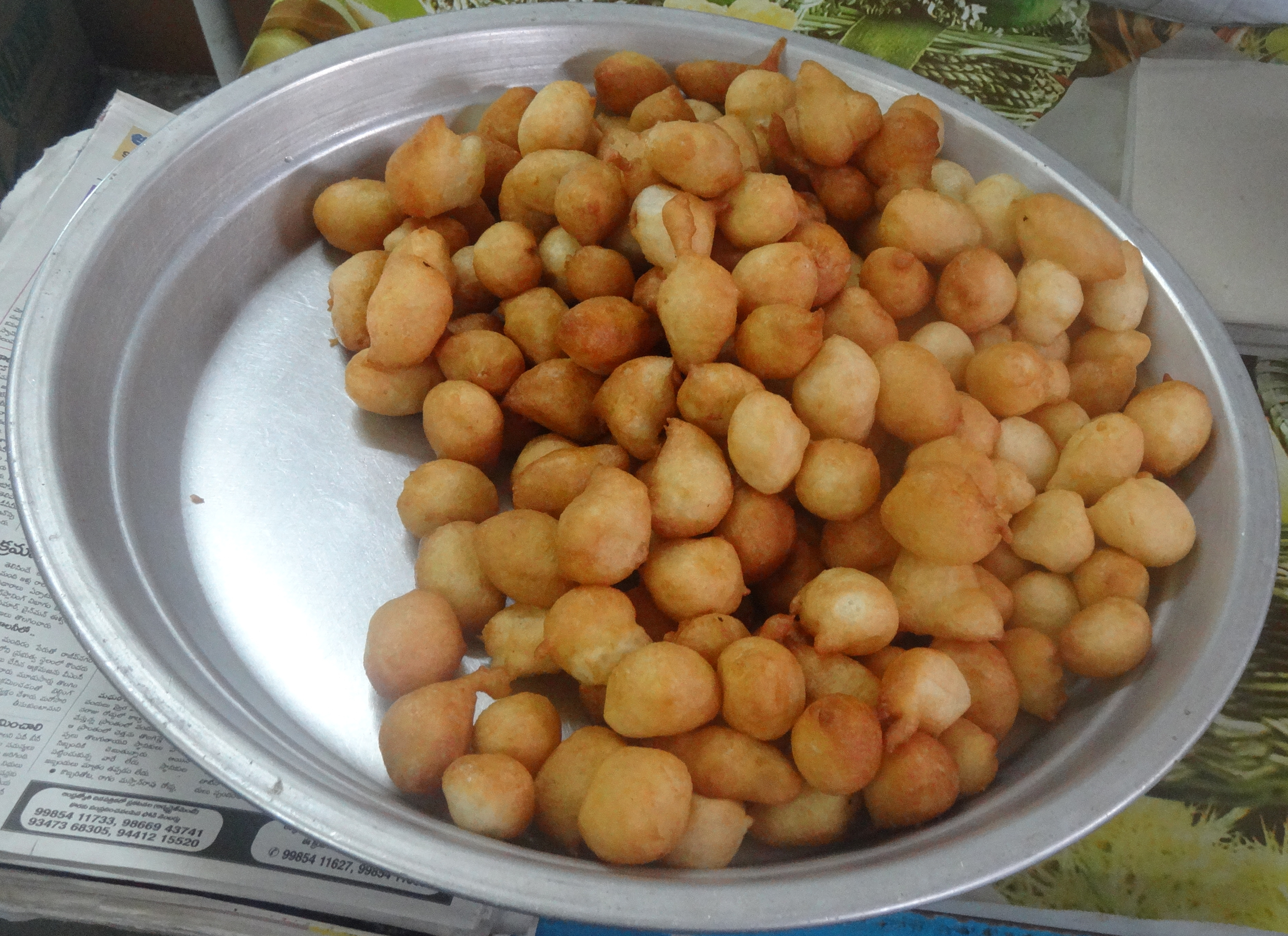
Punugulu

- Vada
  - Garelu, a deep-fried lentil-based doughnut, or sometimes a deep-fried dal mixture
  - Punukulu or punugulu, also known as bonda, a deep-fried dish made from idli and dosa batter
  - Gunta punugulu, made from rice and dal batter
  - Saggubiyyam punugulu, vada made from sago (saboodana)
  - Mung dal punugulu, or bonda, a deep-fried dish made from idli and dosa batter
  - Thapala chekkalu, a deep-fried rice and dal-based flat vada with onions, curry leaves, and chili
- Atukulu or poha
  - Atukulu (also known as poha in the northern states), moist rice flakes sautéed in oil
  - Atukula dosa, dosa made from atukulu poha
  - Atukula upma, upma with sooji replaced with atukulu
- Bread and roti
  - Nokulu annam, made of jowar and jaggery
  - Chapati, baked flattened wheat dough, served with dal or chutney.
  - Puri, wheat dough deep-fried in cooking oil. Served with potato bajji or chutney. Technically a north Indian dish, but widely available in all Telugu restaurants.

=== Lunch and dinner ===
Great effort is put into preparing lunch and dinner in many Telugu households. In most urban households, the food is served on stainless steel or porcelain plates, while in traditional and rural households, the food may be served on a banana leaf. The banana leaf is often used during festivals, special occasions, and for guests. Many middle-budget restaurants in smaller towns also use banana leaves for serving food. At times, a vistaraaku (a larger plate made of several leaves sewn together) is used. Sun-dried banana leaves have also traditionally been used to package food for personal use on long journeys.

A complete vegetarian Andhra meal typically consists of rice served with ghee, pulihora, rice or raagi, pappu (lentils), sambar, chaaru (rasam), fried and wet curries, appadam (papadum), odiyalu, chutney, pachadi, avakaya, yoghurt and a sweet for dessert. In general, food from the Vijayawada-Guntur region contains more chili and spices than food from the rest of Andhra Pradesh. Rice is considered the main dish and everything else is considered a side dish.

== Vegetarian dishes ==
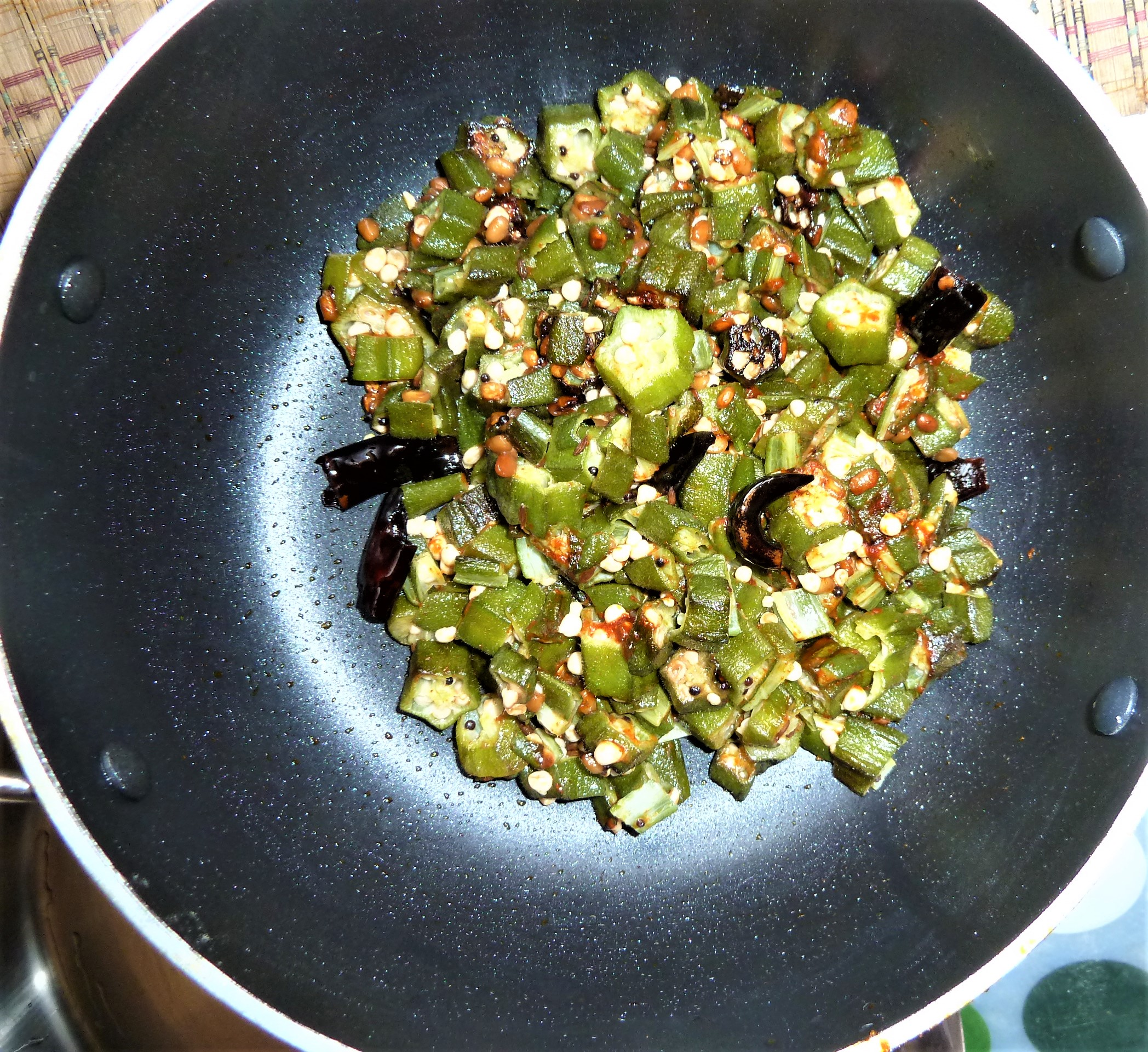
Okra plain curry made in Vijayawada, Andhra Pradesh

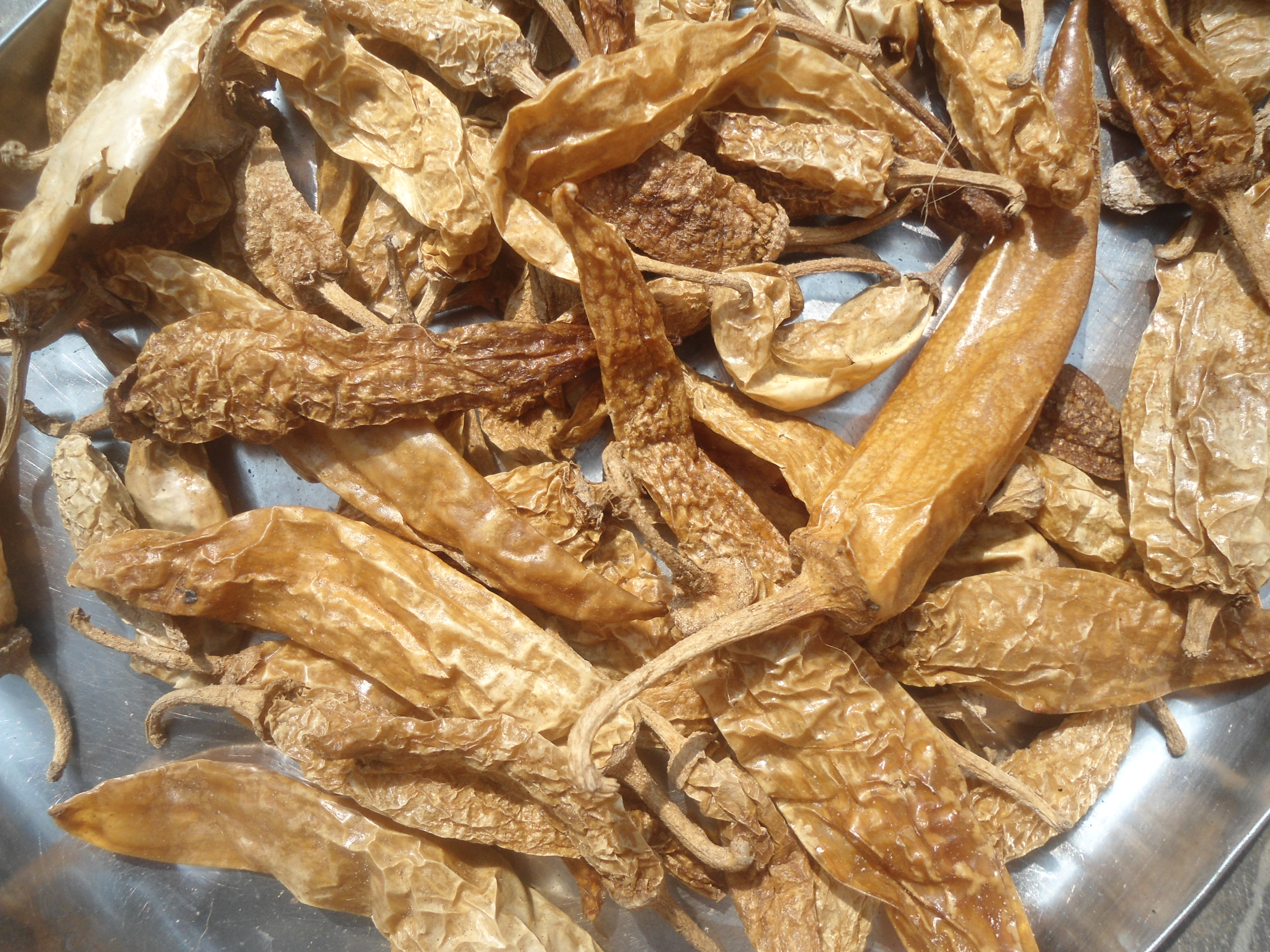
Dried capsicum for chili dishes

=== Meal presentation ===
Pappu (dal/lentils) and kooralu (curries) are placed to the right of the diner, while spiced pickles, pachadi (chutney/raita), a saucy condiment with dahi (yogurt), vegetables, pappulu podi (dal and dry red chili-based powdered condiment), and neyyi (ghee) are placed to the left. On some occasions, special items such as pulihora (tamarind or lemon rice) and garelu (vada) are placed at the top right. A large scoop of annam (plain white rice) is placed in the middle. Small amounts of neyyi are added on the rice. Avakaya (mango pickle) and gongura (roselle leaf pickle) are often served with the meal.

=== Courses and servings ===
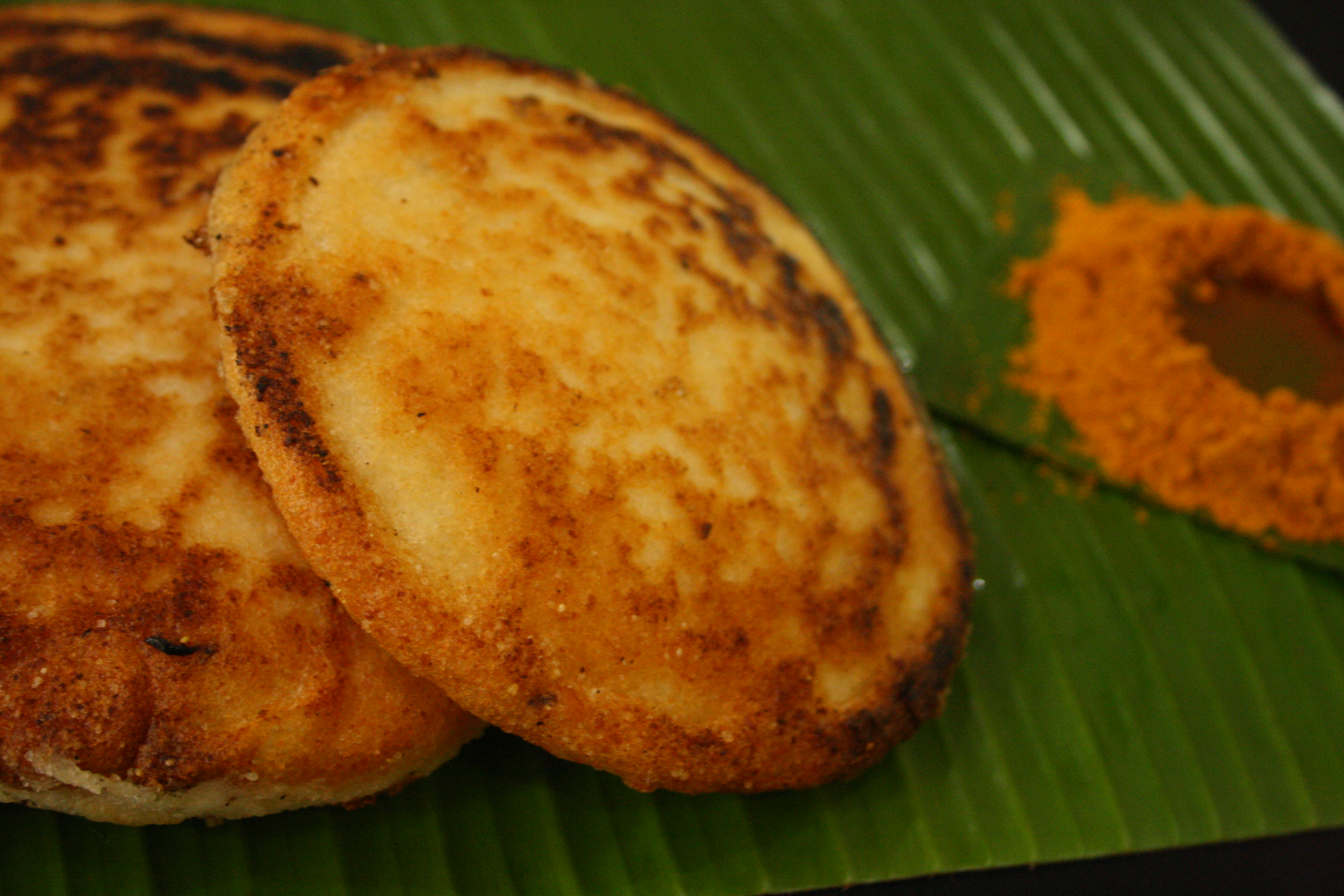
Dibba rotti or minapa rotti is a classic Andhra dish eaten for breakfast, brunch, or evening snack with a chutney or pickle

Rice is the main dish, eaten by mixing with the side dishes using the right hand, and the primary source of carbohydrates. Spiced pickles, pachadi, podi, and papadum (appadam) are typical side dishes.

A meal traditionally starts with modhati muddha (first bite), an appetizer of spiced pickle followed by a pappu (dal) dish, which can be made with vegetables added or eaten plain with a pickle. This constitutes the main source of protein for vegetarians. This is followed by a couple of koora varieties, which provide vitamins and minerals. A pappu or rasam (Telugu: charu), usually kadi, is the third course. The fourth course of the meal is either a perugu (curd or yoghurt) or majjiga (buttermilk) accompanied by a spicy pickle or other condiments.

After the meal, paan or somph (areca nut/betel on pan leaf) is traditionally offered. On festival days or other auspicious occasions, a sweet, usually paravannam, is served with the meal, which is usually eaten first.

== Non-vegetarian dishes ==
Lesser spiny eels stew (బొమ్మిడాయిల పులుసు) and quail roast (కౌజు పిట్ట వేపుడు)	Tamarind shoots and goat curry (చింతచిగురు మాంసం ఇగురు) with mini prawns fry (చిట్టి రొయ్యల వేపుడు)

While there are a plethora of vegetarian dishes in the Telugu cuisine, a vast majority of Telugus (over 98 percent in both Andhra Pradesh and Telangana) also consume non-vegetarian food.

=== Meats ===
Both Andhra Pradesh and Telangana also lead in per capita meat consumption within India. Per capita meat consumption has surged by 40% between 2018-2019 and 2024–2025 in both Telugu states. Per capita meat consumption (excluding seafood) reached 21.33 kg and 28.78 kg in Andhra Pradesh and Telangana, respectively, in 2024 compared to a national average of 7.5 kilograms.

The most widely consumed meats include poultry (chicken, quail, and duck), small ruminants (goat and sheep) and seafood.

==== Poultry ====
A shop sign advertising quails, broiler chicken, country chicken and more.	Ducks for sale at Jāmpēta Market, Rajahmahendravaram.

Chicken is the most prevalent poultry in the Telugu cuisine and has three varieties: Broiler chicken, country chicken (నాటుకోడి) and gamecock (పందెపుకోడి).

What distinguishes country chicken from its conventional broiler counterpart is that it is allowed to roam freely, kept drug free and lives on a minimally processed diet of grains, foraged insects and worms, and vegetables. As a result of this lifestyle, the meat of country chicken is tougher and gamier than that of broiler chicken. It's also believed to be tastier, healthier and capable of strengthening the immune system. Due to these benefits and the longer growth period, country chicken is much costlier than broiler chicken and typically as costly as mutton and chevon, sometimes more depending on demand.

Gamecock refers to roosters bred and reared for cockfights, a popular Sankranti tradition in Andhra Pradesh. These roosters are raised on a high-protein, high-fat diet consisting of minced mutton, eggs, boiled chicken and nuts. As a result of this unique diet and the roosters’ active lifestyle, meat of these roosters is said to be darker and much tougher than that of broiler chicken, taking hours to cook. Traditionally, the losing rooster would be relinquished to the winner and its meat distributed amongst their friends and family. However, due to high demand, it is now more common for the winner to sell the rooster's meat, as it is prized for its unique qualities.

In addition to chicken, quail (కౌజు పిట్ట) is quite popular in the Telugu states due to its nutritional benefits as well as the fact that it is relatively affordable to rear with superior disease resistance compared to other fowl. Duck is also reared in rural areas for its meat and eggs due its fast growth.

==== Seafood ====
Fresh seafood for sale at Jampeta Fish Market, Rajamahendravaram	Various sea and freshwater fish at Jampeta Fish Market

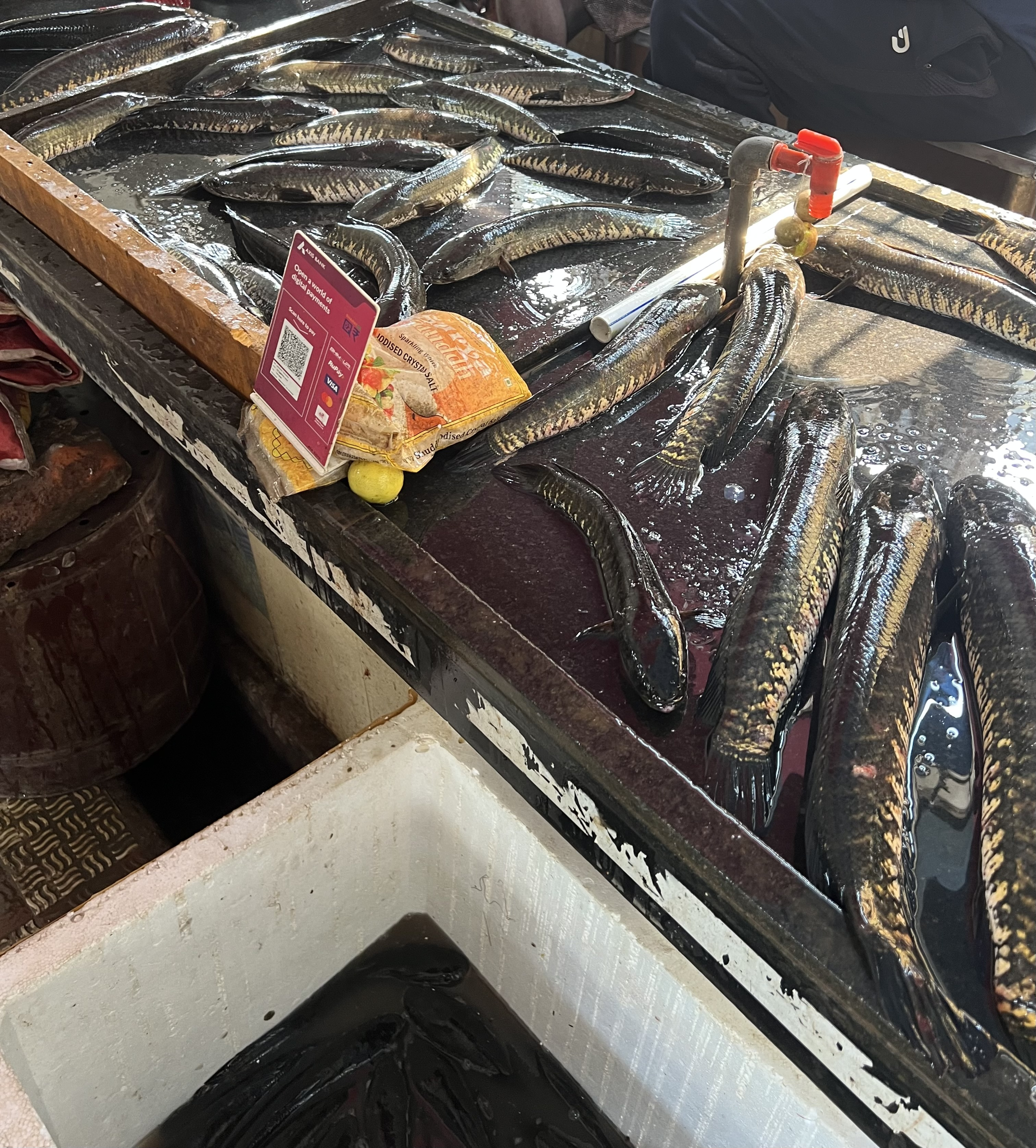
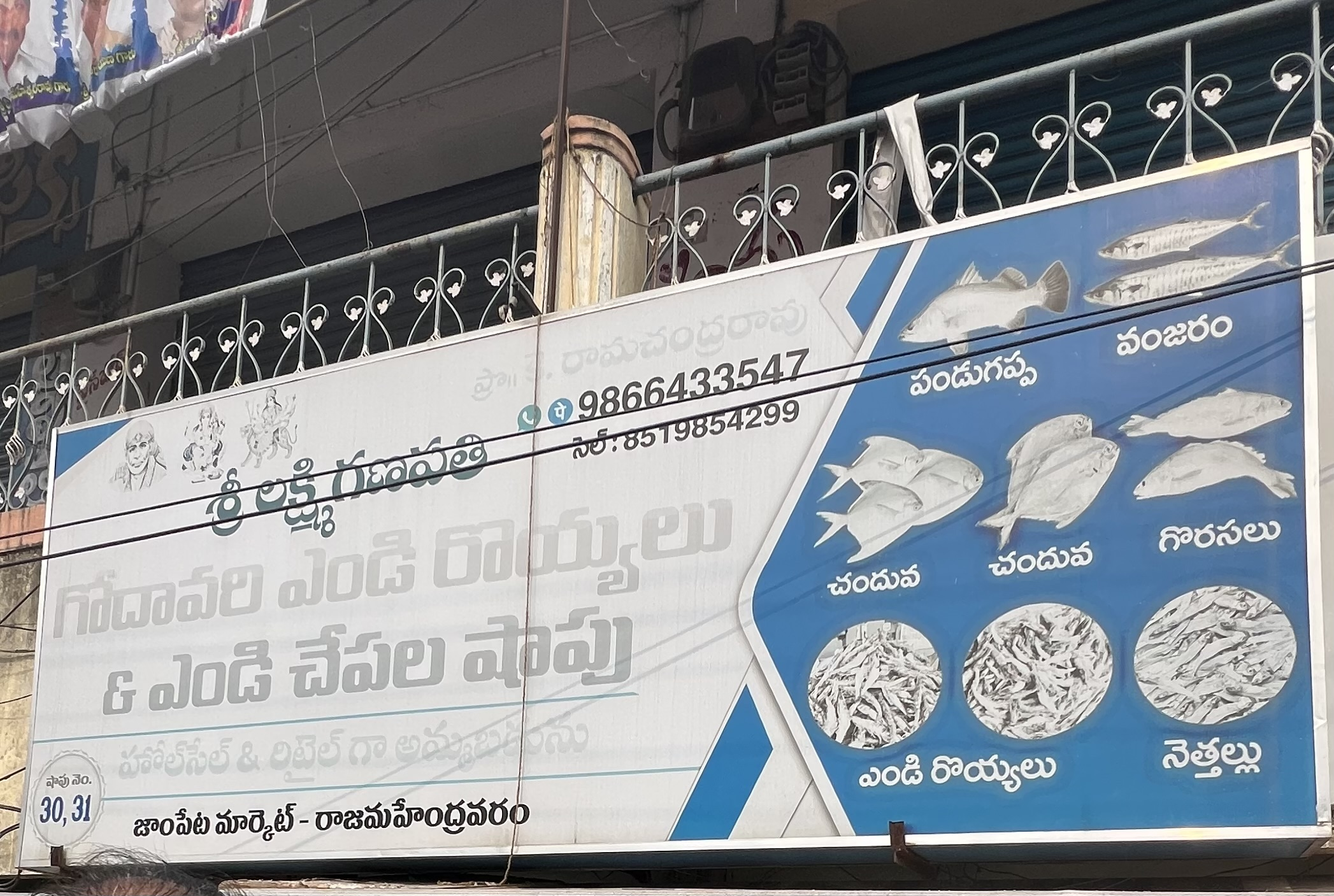
Striped snakeheads and spotted snakeheads (bottom left) for sale	A shop in Jampeta, Rajamahendravaram advertising sun-dried fish and prawns

With the state being the largest producer of fish and accounting for nearly one-third of total fish production in India in 2022–2023, Andhra Pradesh is a major aquaculture hub. Annual per capita fish consumption has also risen steadily, reaching 10.94 kg during 2024-2025.

Popular aquatic foods include fish (చేపలు), prawns (రొయ్యలు), crabs (పీతలు), and squid (కోమటి సంచులు). The multitude of rivers flowing through Andhra Pradesh, paired with the state’s long coast, means that both freshwater fish (చెరువు చేపలు) and sea fish (సముద్రపు చేపలు) are consumed, with preference varying by district.

Popular native fish include striped snakehead (కొర్రమీను) (the state fish of Andhra Pradesh and Telangana), spotted snakehead (మట్టగిడస, బురదమట్ట), Catla carp (బొచ్చె చేప), Rohu carp (గెండి చేప), Mrigal carp (యెర్రమోసు చేప), common carp (బంగారు తీగ చేప), grass carp (గడ్డిమోసు), barramundi (పండుగప్ప చేప), lesser spiny eel (బొమ్మిడాయి), tank goby (ఇసుక దొందు), pulasa (పులస చేప), striped mullet (కొయ్యింగ చేప), finger mullets (కట్టిపరిగెలు), anchovy (నెత్తళ్లు), milkfish (తుళ్ళు చేప, పాలబొంత చేప), beltfish (సావిడాయి), shark (సొర చేప), Indian mackerel (కానగడత చేప), Indo-Pacific king mackerel (వంజరం), narrow-barred Spanish mackerel (కోనెం), elongate mudskipper (రామ చేప), pool barb (చేదు పరిగెలు, బుడ్డ పక్కెలు), Labeo bata (మోసు పరిగెలు), threadfin sea catfish / Mystus Bleekeri/Cavasius/Gulio (జెల్ల చేప), helicopter catfish (వాలుగ చేప), climbing perch (గొరక చేప), Indian salmon (మాగ చేప), Magur (మార్పు చేప), Asian stinging catfish (ఇంగిలాయి), Tilapia (జిలేబి చేప), goatfish (గులివింద చేప) and more.

While many dishes are cooked with fresh fish, preserved fish is also consumed and there are two main types.

The first type is uppu chepalu (ఉప్పు చేపలు), also known as endu chepalu (ఎండు చేపలు). “Uppu” means salt while “endu” means “sun-dried”. To make these, fish are butterflied and cleaned of any guts and waste, placed in salt for 7-15 days and then sun-dried for several more days until they become rigid and all moisture is gone. This technique allows for fish to stay fresh for weeks, if not months.

The second type is chappidi chepalu (చప్పిడి చేపలు), also known as ārchina chepalu (ఆర్చిన చేపలు). “Chappidi” means “bland” or “saltless” while “ārchina” means “dried”. This preparation is native to the Godavari districts of Andhra Pradesh.

First, river fish (most commonly striped mullets) have their guts and waste removed but the scales are left on. Then, they are left to dry in the sun for a bit. After this, coir is spread like a mat and a flame is lit in the center. Then, bagasse is placed on the mat and the fish are heaped on top of the bagasse, allowing for them to be smoked without coming into contact with the flame, which is said to impart a rich taste.

Unlike their salted counterparts, these fish can only stay fresh for up to 2 days without refrigeration. When the fish are about to be cooked, the burnt skin is peeled off and the fish are typically cooked in a thick curry alongside eggs or vegetables such as brinjal, tamarind, tomato, drumsticks and broad beans.

In addition to the aforementioned seafoods, in the districts adjacent to the Godavari River, escargot (నత్తలు) is consumed by some, due to the belief that it can treat many ailments as well as its affordability.

==== Red meat ====
Goat and sheep carcasses at Jampeta, Rajamahendravaram	Goat and sheep offals, heads and trotters at Jampeta, Rajamahendravaram

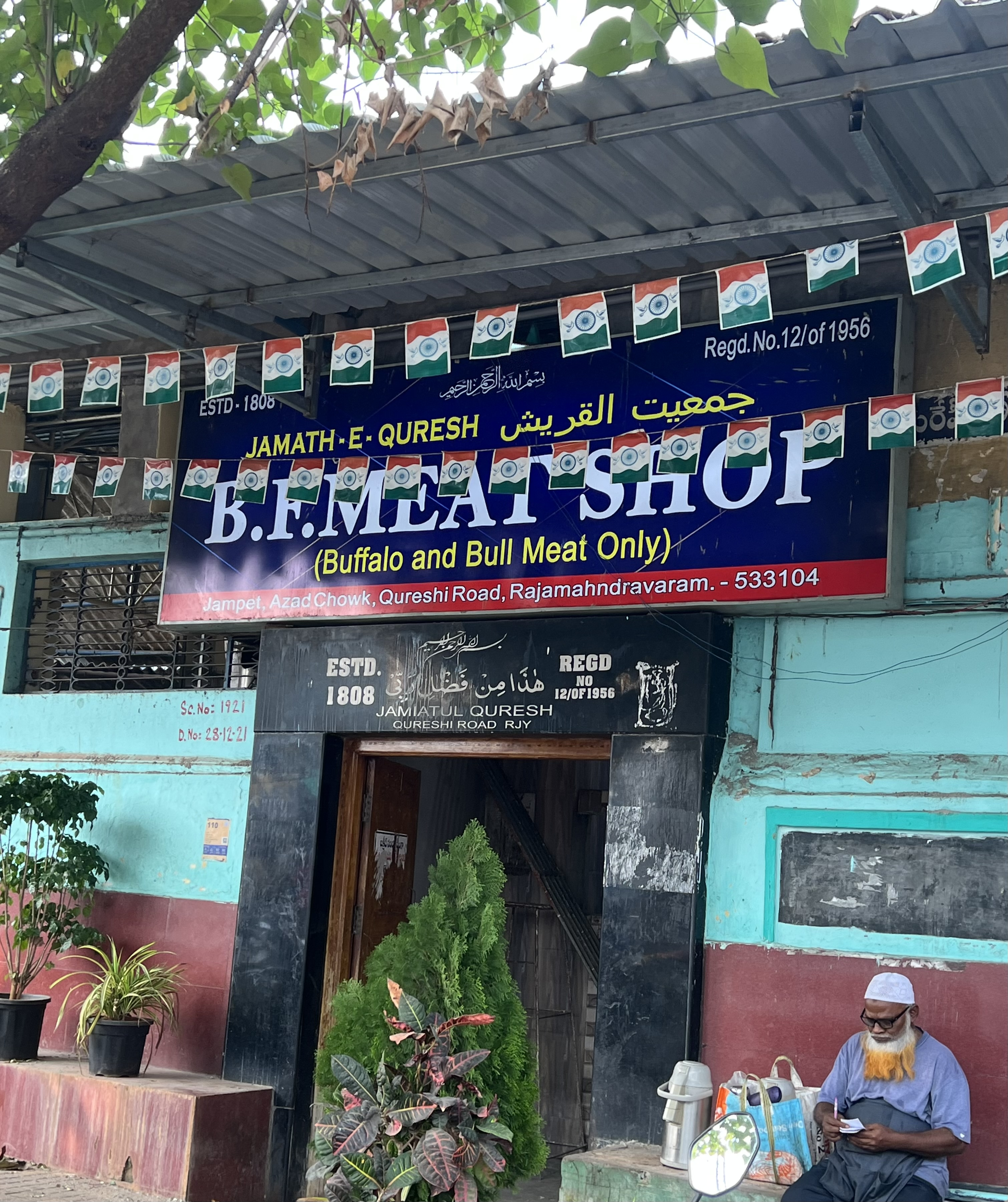
A shop selling beef and water buffalo meat

The rearing of small ruminants, particularly sheep, forms the backbone of the rural Telugu economy, with Andhra Pradesh and Telangana each accounting for around 25% of India’s sheep population. As a result, chevon and lamb/mutton are staples in many Telugus’ diets.

In contrast, the consumption of beef and pork is less common, likely due to religious and cultural taboos.

Besides muscle meat, special parts of goat and sheep such as offal and trotters are also consumed, with popular examples including liver fry (కార్జం వేపుడు), brain fry (మెదడు వేపుడు), spleen fry (నెరడు/తిల్లీ వేపుడు), tripe and intestines curry (బోటి/పేగుల కూర), trotter stew (కాళ్ల పులుసు), blood fry (నల్ల వేపుడు), and testicles fry or curry (పిచ్చల/కప్పురాల వేపుడు/కూర).

Instead of small ruminants, some communities, such as the Madigas, rely on beef or water buffalo meat for protein, with over 3.2 million in erstwhile United Andhra Pradesh consuming it.

Additionally, due to prevailing superstitions, donkey meat and milk are considered delicacies in central Andhra Pradesh, despite the illegality of the former. Donkey meat is also popular due to its relative affordability compared to the meat of small ruminants, with the former only costing around 700 rupees per kg. However, donkey milk is extremely expensive, costing as much as 20,000 rupees per liter.

Wild boar meat is also illegal yet consumed in rural areas.

==== Rabbit meat ====
Due to their high fecundity and feed efficiency, rabbits are being reared for meat in parts of Andhra Pradesh though they remain a niche food item.

However, as a result of its leanness and protein density, rabbit meat is growing popular in restaurants as it is seen as a healthier and tastier alternative to chicken.

=== Popular meat dishes ===
Hyderabadi biryani and palaav, or "Andhra biryani", are popular dishes within the region. Royyala palav, made with shrimp, is considered a delicacy in coastal Andhra Pradesh. Mutton biryani and mixed biryani (chicken, mutton, and shrimp) are other popular biryani dishes, generally available in restaurants. There are many local variations as well, such as kaaja biryani, kunda biryani (pot biryani), avakaya biryani, ulavacharu biryani, and panasa biryani.

Kodi (chicken) koora and mutton koora are two popular meat dishes, often made with a range of spices and condiments. The base usually consists of onions, tomato, coriander, tamarind, and coconut. These are mixed with steamed rice on the plate during the meal. Pepper is also used on fried meat dishes. Popular dishes commonly served in Andhra-style restaurants include the spicy Andhra chili chicken, chicken roast, and mutton pepper fry. For seafood dishes, a tamarind base is generally used. Shrimp and prawns are widely available for use in cuisine, due to the state's extensive shrimp farming industry.

Other common meat dishes include:

- Talakaya pulusu (తలకాయ పులుసు): Talakaya pulusu is a sour and spicy stew made with chunks of charred goat or sheep head and a multitude of spices. It is a soupier and sourer version of talakaya kura due to the generous use of tamarind juice. First, finely cut onion pieces and slit green chilis are fried. Next, turmeric, curry leaves and ginger-garlic paste are also added and fried slightly. Then, the head chunks are added alongside chili powder, salt and coriander powder. After the head pieces are fried for a bit, water and tamarind juice are added. Then, at the end, garam masala is added.
- Chepala pulusu (చేపల పులుసు): a fish curry seasoned with freshly ground spices and tamarind juice. The exact spices used vary by regional style but the three major styles of chepala pulusu are the Godavari style, Nellore style and Telangana style. In general, all chepala pulusulu use coriander seeds as the main spice but additional spices differ. The Nellore style is known for its simplicity and has the addition fenugreek seeds and mustard seeds. The Godavari style adds cumin seeds and ginger garlic paste. The Telangana style uses dry roasted coconut husks, poppy seeds and groundnuts.
- Endu chepala vankaya (ఎండు చేపల వంకాయ): a flavourful dry fish curry cooked with brinjal.
- Gongura Endu Royyalu (గోంగూర ఎండు రొయ్యలు): a curry made with gongura leaves, sun-dried prawns and various spices. Part of the appeal of using sun-dried prawns as opposed to fresh ones is that they have minimal odor.
- Gongura Mamsam (గోంగూర మాంసం): spicy and sour curry made with tender goat or sheep pieces cooked in a curry of gongura (roselle leaves) and freshly-ground green chili paste.
- Gudla pulusu (కోడి గుడ్ల పులుసు): egg curry sprinkled with chopped onions, green chilis, and coriander.
- Natukodi Pulusu (నాటుకోడి పులుసు): A spicy savory country chicken curry/stew originating from the Rayalaseema region. This is often paired with ragi sangati.
- Vatti Tunakalu (వట్టి తునకలు): Also known as endu mukkalu (ఎండు ముక్కలు) (lit. “Sun-dried pieces”) or uppāsulu (ఉప్పాసులు), depending on the dialect. To make this traditional jerky, raw meat is first cut into small chunks. Then, these chunks are coated in seasoning such as salt, turmeric, chili powder and ginger-garlic paste, strung on a clothesline and left out in the sunlight for around a week. Once they harden, they can be stored for up to a year in an airtight container or cooked into a curry. Typically, chevon or mutton is used but some use beef or buff instead.
- Doopudu Potu Pulao (దూపుడు పోతు పులావ్): This pulao dish originates from the Bhimavaram region of Andhra Pradesh and it's also known as Doopudu Gorre Pulao (దూపుడు గొర్రె పులావ్). First, a ram is charred with the skin left on to impart a distinct smokey flavor. Then, the meat is cubed and these cubes are cooked with gravy. Later, it's added to the rice which was cooked separately. Typically, Chitti Mutyalu rice is used.
- Sorapittu (సొరపిట్టు): A dry fry made with spices and minced shark meat.
- Miryala Mamsam Vepudu (మిర్యాల మాంసం వేపుడు): This crispy spicy roast is a popular starter in many Telugu restaurants, and it is made by frying mostly boneless chunks of goat or lamb in several spices with pepper being the dominant one.
- Bongu Kodi (బొంగు కోడి): Bongu Kodi (lit. “Bamboo Chicken”) is a unique dish that originates from the Araku Valley region of Andhra Pradesh. First, chicken is marinated in spices and set aside for half an hour. Then, the chicken is stuffed into hollow tubes fashioned from bamboo stalks and the ends of the tube are sealed shut with banana leaves. Next, the bamboo stalks are placed on firewood until all the moisture in the bamboo has evaporated. Once it cools down, the chicken is served. What makes this dish special is that no cooking oil or water is necessary as the moisture in the bamboo itself is sufficient to cook the chicken while imparting a rich smoky flavor.

These dishes are usually served with steamed rice, Thalimpu annam (basmati rice cooked with aromatic seasoning), sajja roti (millet flatbread), or jonna roti (jowar flatbread).

Non-vegetarian snacks include kodi pakodi (chicken pakora), chicken 65, peetha pakodi (crab pakodi), chepa vepudu (fish fry), royyala vepudu (shrimp fry), and chicken lollipop.

Bhimavaram town in West Godavari district is famous for its unique non-vegetarian pickles, such as chicken, shrimp, and fish pickles.

== Snacks ==
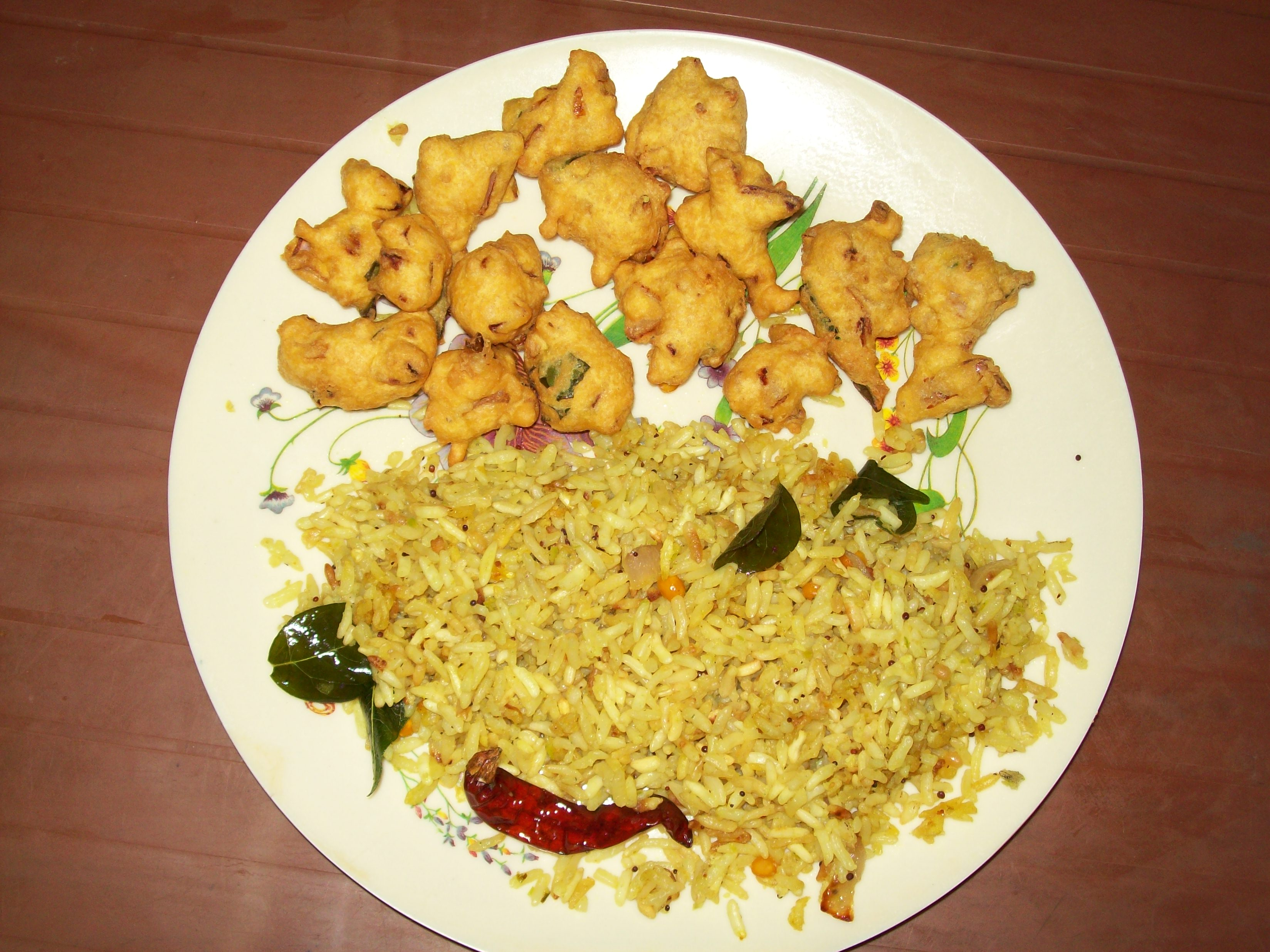
Uggani bajji, a favorite snack in Rayalaseema

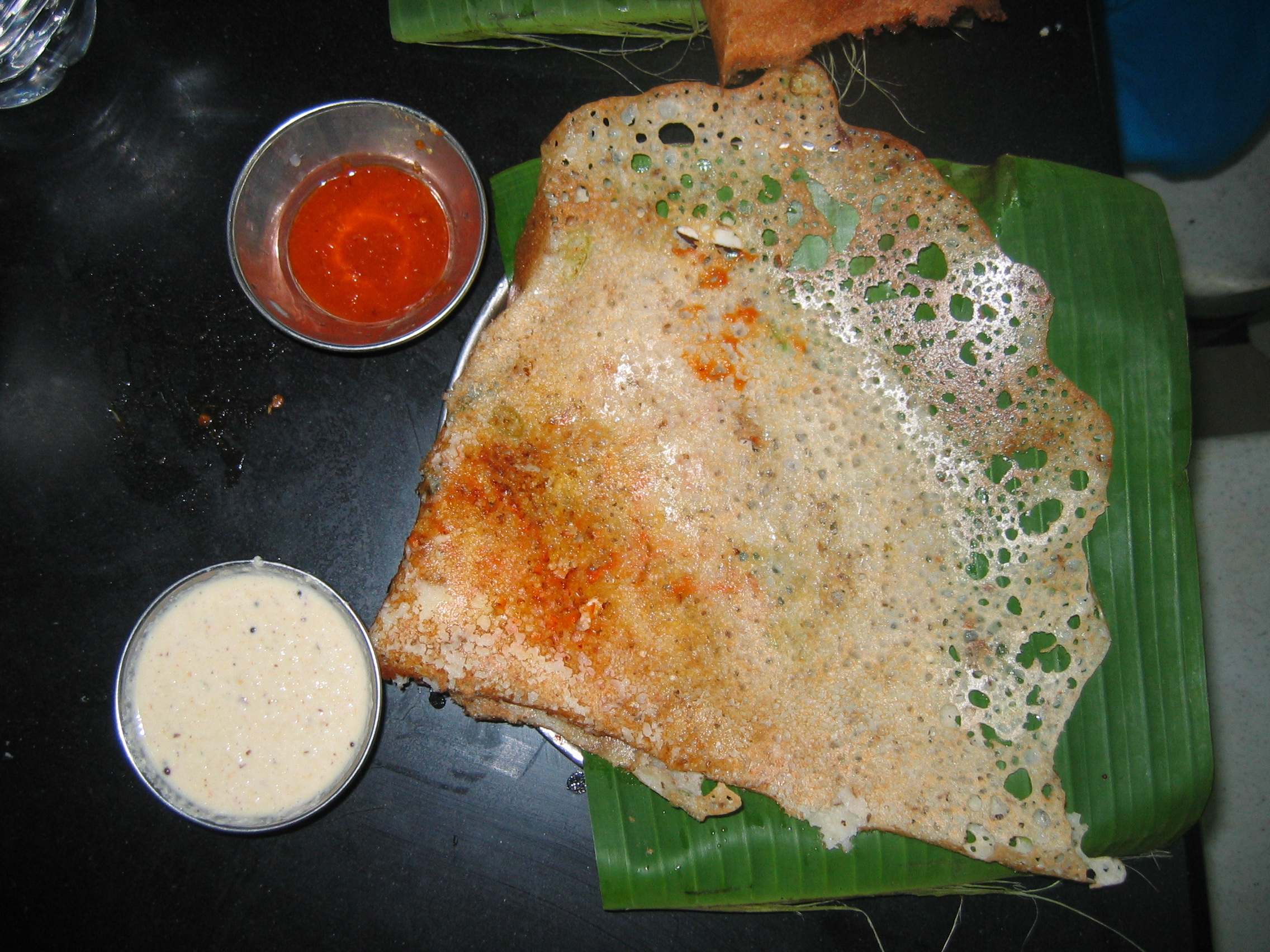
Ravva dosa served at a hotel in Guntur

Some common Telugu snacks include:

- Upma (ఉప్మా)
- Boondi (బూంది)
- Kaarappoosa (కారప్పూస)
- Ponganalu (పొంగనాలు)
- Bajji and bondaalu or punukulu (బజ్జి, బోండాలు or పునుకులు), stuffed with spices, dipped in chickpea batter and fried; served with a spicy dip (allam pachadi). Other varieties include mirapakaya bajji (chili), vamu bajji, vankaya bajji (brinjal), aratikaya bajji (plantain), urla gadda bajji (potato), and vegetable bonda.
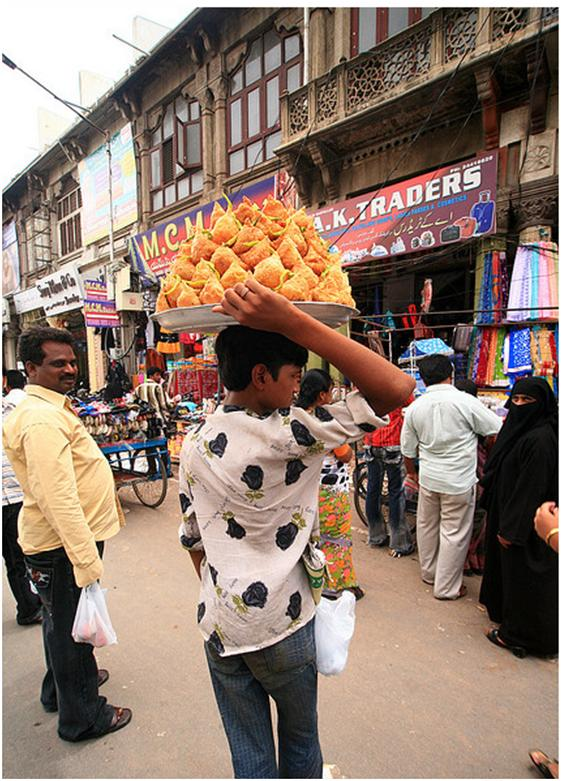
  Samosa vendor on the streets of Hyderabad
- Pakodi (పకోడీ)

- Ulli kaadalu pakodi
- Sanna pakodi
- Vankaya pakodi
- Other varieties include royallu pakodi, kodi pakodi, and ullipakodi (fritters made with sliced onion and spices fried in chickpea batter)

- Gaare (గారె), spiced deep-fried dough

- Varieties include:perugu gaare/aavadalu (ఆవడలు), gaare marinated in a yogurt sauce, bellam garelu, rava garelu, ulli garelu, pulla garelu

- Jantikalu (జంతికలు)

- Varieties include pesarapappu jantikalu, challa murukulu, chegodilu(చేగోడీలు), sakinalu or chakkidalu (చక్కిడాలు), chakli, chekkalu or chuppulu (చెక్కలు or చుప్పులు), maida chips, molocasia chips, plain papadam, and aam papad

- Maramaraalu or puffed rice: Usually mixed with tomatoes, onions, coriander, lime juice, and chili powder.
- Bean/pea snacks, such as senagala talimpu and guggillu (గుగ్గిళ్ళు)
- Mixed snacks, such as boondi mixed with chopped onions and lemon juice

== Sweets ==
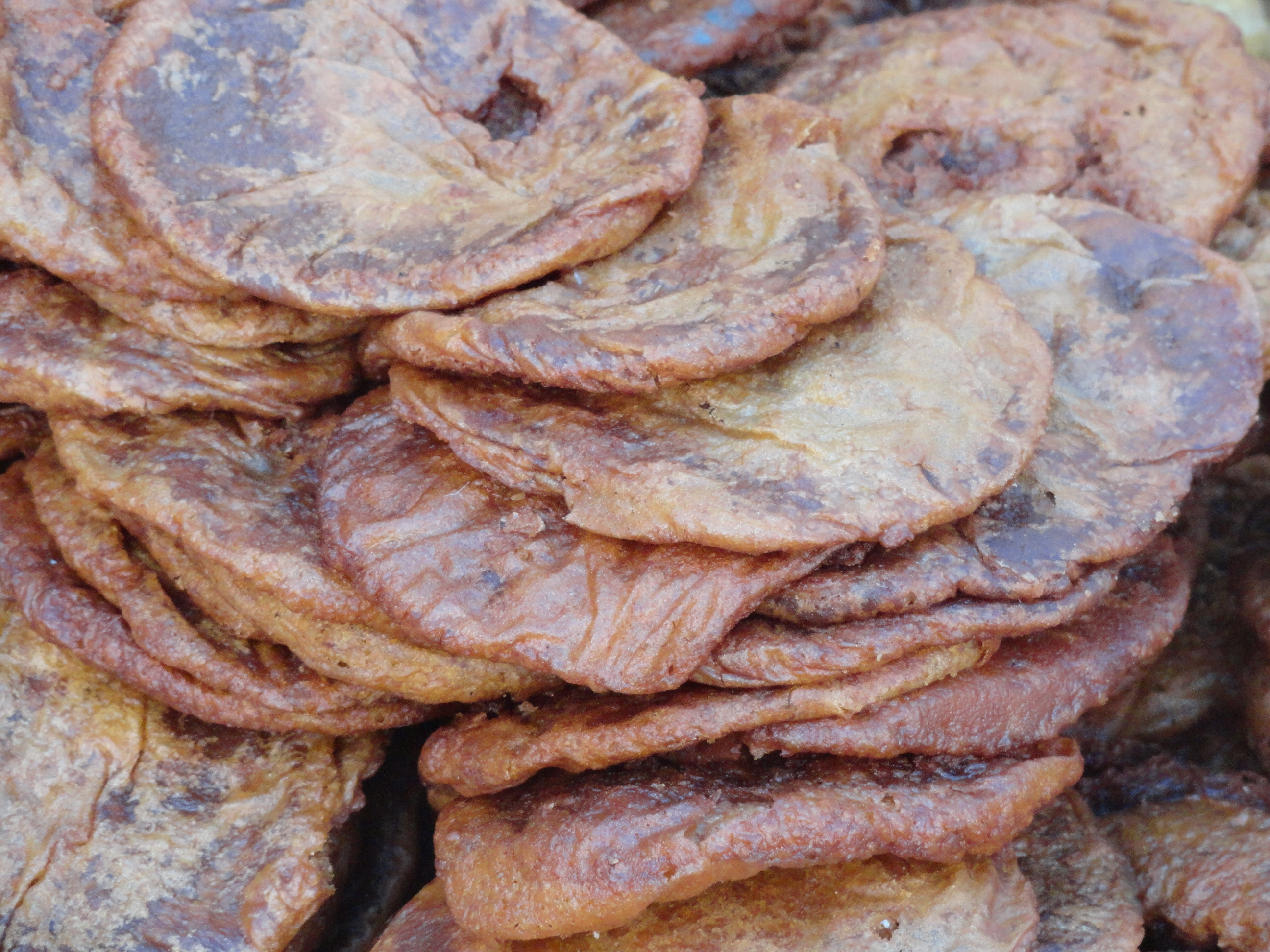
Appachulu

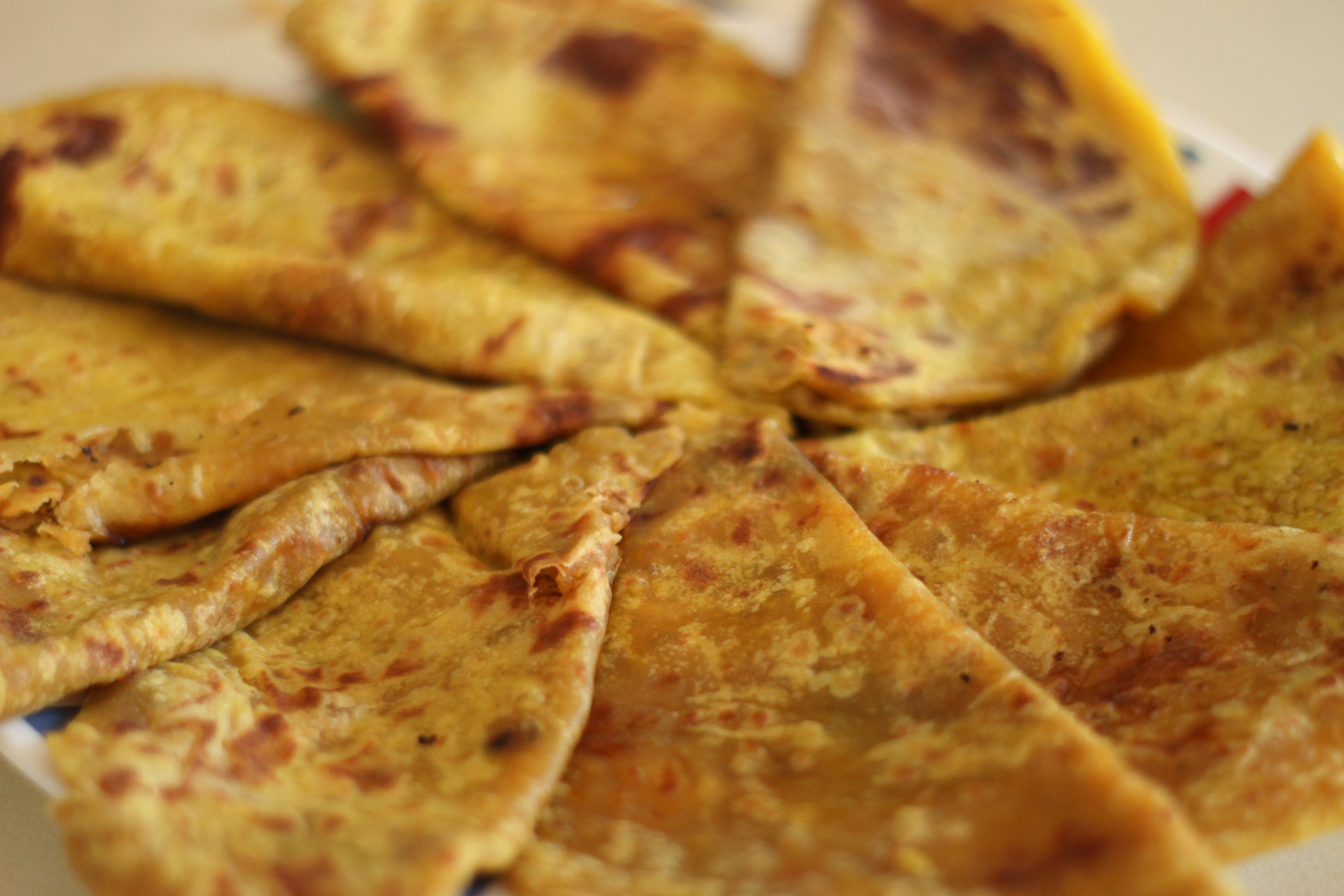
Bobbatlu, a snack made from wheat or sooji, filled with jaggery and lentils

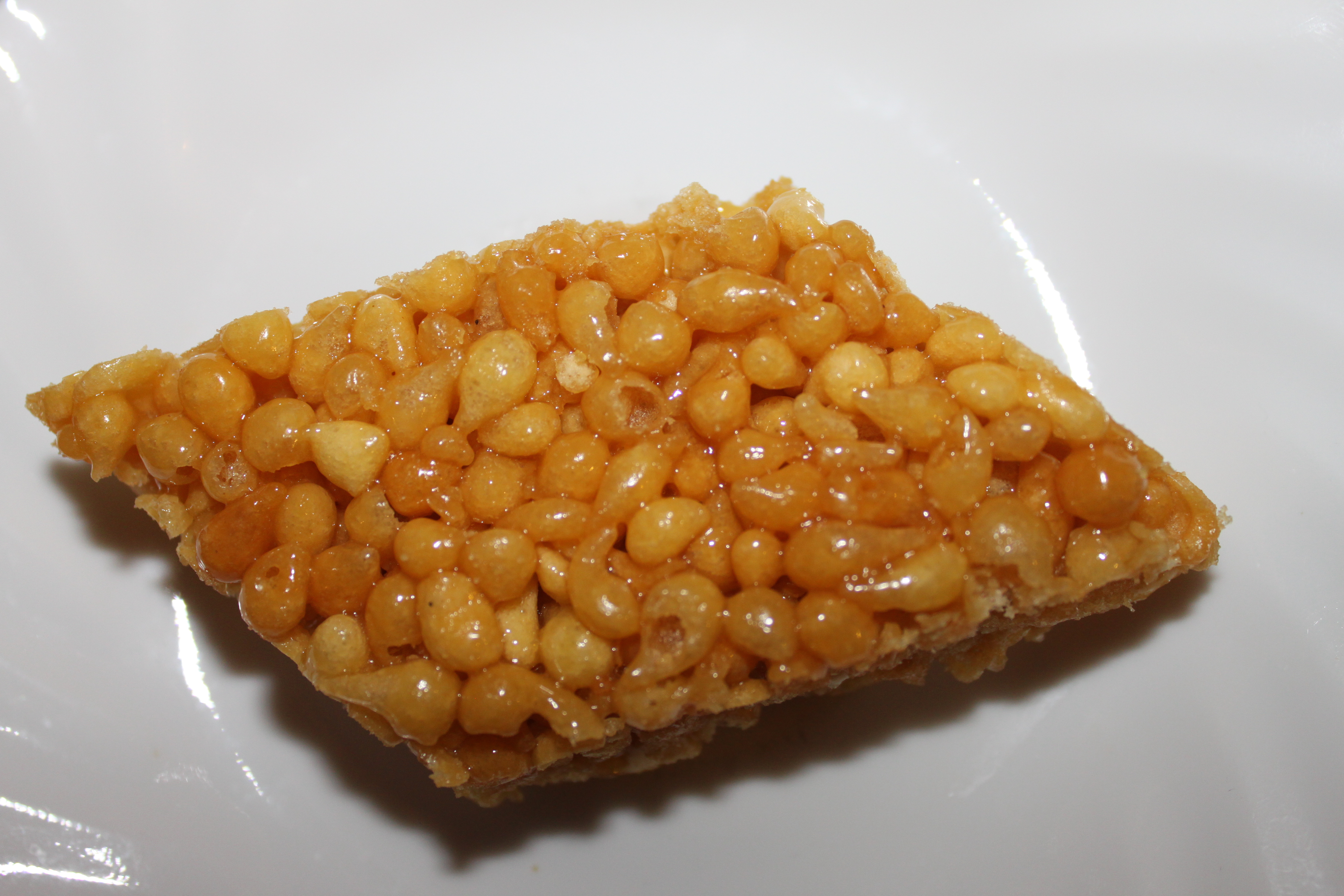
Boondi mithai or karakajjam

Sweets and savories are typically made on festive and auspicious occasions, and are served to visiting relatives. Some of the savories below are also prepared as an evening snack.

- Pootharekulu, a sweet dish consisting of sweet powder with cardamom flavor stuffed into very thin pancake skins made of rice flour. Pootharekulu was created in Atreyapuram, a village in Andhra Pradesh.
- Kaaja, a deep-fried pastry filled with fruit or soaked in syrup. Variations such as madatha kaaja and kakinada kaaja are eaten across the region.
- Sakinalu, one of the most popular savories, is often cooked during the Makara Sankranti festival season. It is a deep-fried snack made of rice flour and sesame seeds, flavored with ajwain (carom seeds or vaamu in Telugu).
- Kajjikayalu: fried dumpling stuffed with suji, dry coconut powder, and sugar. It is usually prepared during Deepavali.
- Sunnundallu, laddu made with roasted urad dal (minapappu) and jaggery (bellam)/ sugar. A generous amount of ghee is usually added to enhance the flavour.
- Ariselu, a sweet fried snack made of rice flour
- Boondi laddu
- Poornam boorelu a.k.a. Poornalu, made by cooking chana dal until soft, cooling, then adding jaggery and cardamom powder. The mix is then rolled into balls, which are subsequently batter-fried. The batter that is used is made from urad dal. This sweet dish is usually served during a festival lunch.
- Rava laddu
- Bobbatlu or polelu, sweet flatbread made of senega pappu (chickpea flour)
- Tapeswaram kaja
- Pulagam a.k.a. pongali, a sweet dish made on a festival morning as an offering for a deity. Soaked rice is cooked in milk at a ratio of 1:2.5; when the rice is cooked, well-broken jaggery is added. The dish is completed by adding a splash of ghee and fried dry fruit.
- Payasam, a sweet pudding sometimes served in temples
- Gavvalu or "sweet shells" (Telugu: గవ్వలు, gavvalu), deep-fried and sugared balls of flour
- Chakkera pongali (sugar pongal)
- Laskora undalu (coconut laddu) or raskora undalu (coconut laddu)
- Boondi, a fried snack made of chickpea flour
- Palathalikalu, an Indian sweet made during Ganesh Chaturthi
- Ravva kesari
- Pappuchekka
- Jeedilu
- Malai khaja, a traditional sweet from Nellore
- Kobbari lavuju, grated coconut flesh in molten jaggery or sugar syrup
- Vennappalu

Bandar laddu and Bandar halwa Palathalikalu Paramannam

== Rural cuisine ==
In rural Andhra Pradesh, agriculture is the predominant occupation. Some centuries-old cooking practices can still be observed, particularly the use of mud pots, but this practice is being replaced by the use of steel utensils in recent decades. Traditional recipes have largely been influenced by what was grown and available locally earlier in history. In the drier districts, jowar (sorghum), bajra (millet) and ragi are still in use, while eating rice is seen as a symbol of prosperity. In the Delta and coastal districts, rice plays a major role in the cuisine.
