= Sunnundallu =

Traditional sweet from Andhra Pradesh, India

Sunnundalu
- Alternative names: Sunni vunda
- Course: Sweet dish
- Place of origin: Andhra Pradesh
- Region or state: South India
- Main ingredients: Urad dal (black gram), Ghee, Jaggery

Sunnundalu (Telugu: సున్నుండలు) or Sunni vunda is a traditional Indian sweet from the state of Andhra Pradesh. It is made primarily from whole urad dal (black gram), ghee, and jaggery or sugar. It is valued both as a festive delicacy and as a wholesome nutritional food. Sunnundallu are known for its rich taste, high protein content, and long shelf life, making them a staple in many households.

== Etymology ==
The name Sunnundalu comes from the Telugu word sunnam (సున్నం), referring to the finely ground urad dal flour used in the preparation, and undalu (ఉండలు), meaning "balls" or "laddus".

== Origin ==
Sunnundalu have been part of Telugu culinary tradition for centuries, particularly in rural households where urad dal is a staple crop. They are deeply associated with festivals such as Sankranti, Deepavali, and Sri Rama Navami, and are also traditionally prepared for pregnant women and lactating mothers due to their high nutritional value. In Telugu culture, offering Sunnundalu to guests is considered a gesture of warmth and prosperity.

== Preparation ==
The preparation begins by dry-roasting whole urad dal until aromatic and light golden, which enhances its flavor and digestibility. The roasted dal is then ground into a fine flour. This flour is mixed with powdered jaggery (or sugar) and melted ghee, kneaded until the mixture holds together. Small, round laddus are shaped by hand. Variations may include the addition of cardamom powder for flavor or chopped nuts for texture.

== See also ==
- Ariselu
- Boorelu
- Kakinada Kaja
- Pootharekulu
- Kajjikayalu
