= Naatu kodi pulusu =

Telugu curry dish

- Place of origin: India
- Region or state: Andhra Pradesh; Telangana
- Main ingredients: Country chicken (naatu kodi), tamarind, Indian spices

Naatu kodi pulusu (Telugu: నాటుకోడి పులుసు) is a traditional country chicken curry or stew from Andhra Pradesh and Telangana, India, central to Telugu cuisine. The phrase naatu kodi means "country chicken," denoting free-range, locally raised poultry, while pulusu refers to a tamarind-based curry.

== Preparation ==
The preparation begins with cleaning the chicken and optionally marinating it with turmeric, salt, pepper, or curd to tenderize the meat. The spice base is made by dry roasting coriander seeds, dry coconut, poppy seeds, cinnamon, cloves, and cardamom, then grinding them into a fine paste. Cooking involves tempering whole spices in hot oil, sautéing onions, ginger-garlic paste, green chilies, and curry leaves, then adding the roasted spice paste, chicken pieces, tamarind extract, and water. The dish is simmered slowly until the meat becomes tender and the flavors deepen. While clay pots over wood fires are traditional, modern kitchens often use pressure cookers or heavy-bottomed vessels.

== Regional variations ==
Across Andhra Pradesh and Telangana, the dish varies according to local tastes and available ingredients:

- Rayalaseema style: Known for its intense heat, with generous amounts of red chili powder creating a fiery flavor.
- Coastal Andhra style: Balances spice with tanginess, often using more tamarind and fresh coconut for a slightly sweet, rich texture.
- Telangana style: Sometimes uses sesame oil for its nutty aroma and includes tomato puree to add depth and mild acidity.

== Cultural significance ==
Naatu kodi pulusu is deeply embedded in Telugu culinary tradition. The cultural importance of naatu kodi pulusu is particularly strong in Rayalaseema, where it is inseparably linked with ragi mudda (finger millet balls). This pairing is rooted in the agrarian heritage of the region, where ragi was a staple crop and the robust, earthy stew provided nourishment and sustenance for labor-intensive farming life. It is also popular during weekends and festivals like Sankranti, commonly served with vadas (garelu), hot rice, ragi sangati, or dosas.

== See also ==
- Cuisine of Andhra Pradesh
- South Indian cuisine
