= Ankapur chicken =

Ankapur Chicken
- Place of origin: India
- Region or state: Ankapur, Telangana
- Main ingredients: Country Chicken

Ankapur chicken is popular country chicken curry from Ankapur village, Nizamabad district, Telangana, India. The name is derived from the village, the place of its origin. The fiery chicken and its preparation is now considered one of the signature recipes of Telangana Region.

== History ==
The dish is from a prosperous, award-winning model village in Telangana State, Ankapur village. The rich farming village is popular for its turmeric, corn, vegetables, seeds and other crops. It was popularized by a small hotels in Ankapur village in 1980s, farmers liked the simple and hot dish. It grew in popularity with the local people for its fiery taste and unique blend of ingredients. This has gradually become popular after it started in 1980s. People visiting Nizamabad town, started visiting Ankapur village to taste the popular dish.

== Preparation ==
The country chicken sourced from Ankapur village that is lean, and feeds on freely-found grains and insects is key to the taste. The ingredients are all locally sourced including country chicken, marinated and then cooked with onions, curry leaves, chili powder, freshly minced ginger, garlic, coconut powder, and blending Indian spices in a certain way. The chicken is burnt on a low flame and cooked in an aluminum utensil.

The popularity is because of its special recipe and prepared with country hen giving it a unique taste. The order for a whole chicken is served with the curry along with a kilo of white rice, sliced onions and lemon.

== Popularity ==
It was also part of the food served to showcase Telangana cuisine in World Telugu Conference held in 2017.
