= Sarva Pindi =

Indian pancake

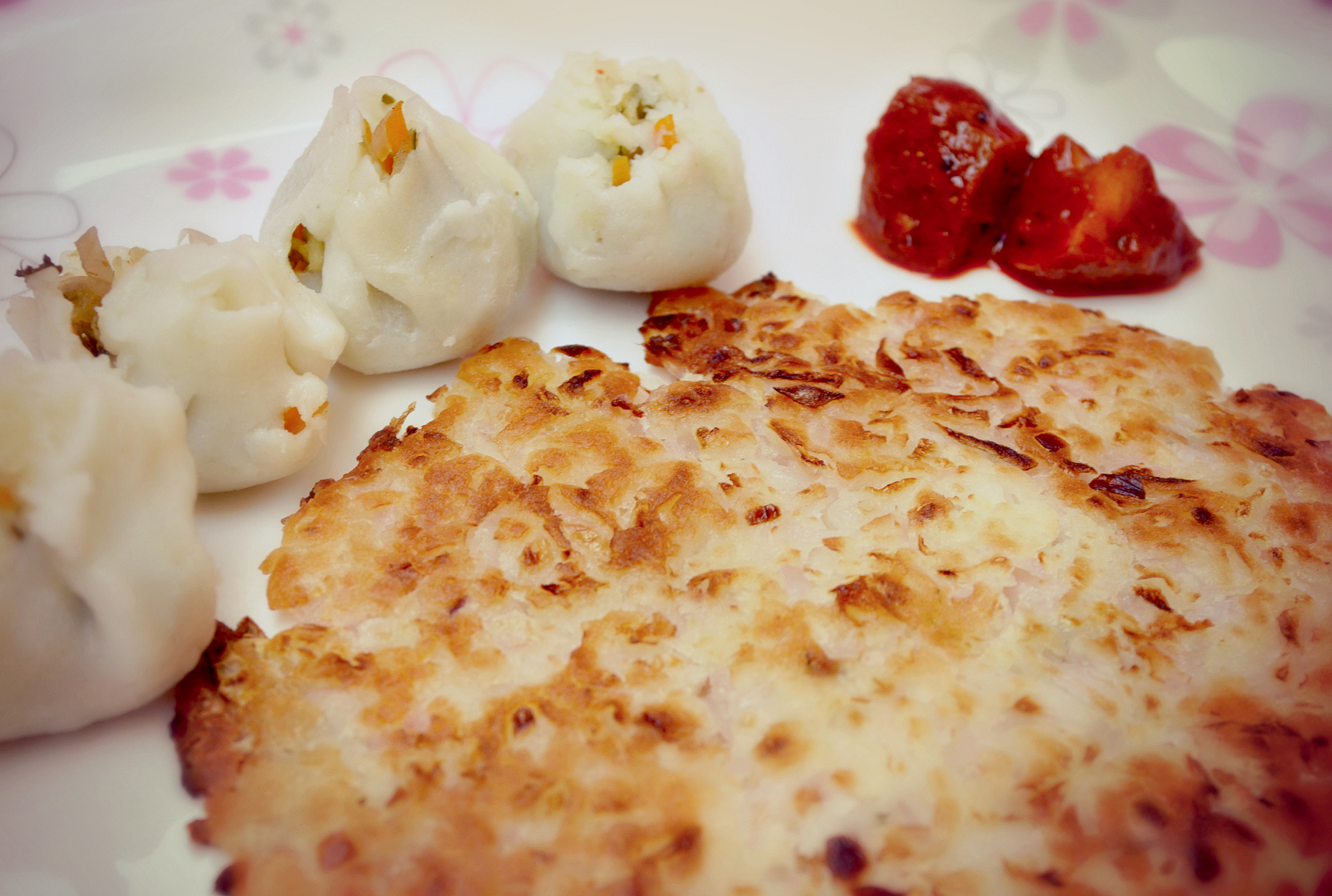
- Sarvapindi
- Type: Snack
- Place of origin: India
- Region or state: Telangana
- Main ingredients: Rice flour

Sarva pindi is a savory, circular-shaped pancake made from rice flour and peanuts in Telangana, India. In the Warangal district, the item is known as "tappala chekka", while in Siddipet it is also known as "sarva pindi". "Ganju" means utensil or a round shaped bowl and "pindi" means flour in Telugu language. So, the phrase "Ganju Pindi" can be described as rice flour that is made like atta flour and stick to the round shaped pan. In Warangal, the dish is known as "ginnappa". Eventually the snack became popular throughout Telangana.

== Ingredients ==
Sarva pindi is essentially made of rice flour, channa dal (lentil), peanuts and spices, making it a delicious and healthy dish.

== Etymology ==
The word Sarva Pindi comes from a combination of two terms: "sarva", meaning a deep pot or pan; and "appa", meaning a cake-sort of preparation. Therefore, the direct translation of Sarva pindi is the "pan cake". The Sarva Pindi pancake is one of the ethnic dishes from the Telangana cuisine.

== Grade ==
It is recognized as one of the Telangana Traditional cuisines.
