= Talakaya Kura =

- Course: Main
- Place of origin: India
- Region or state: Andhra Pradesh Telangana
- Main ingredients: lamb

Talakaya kura (తలకాయ కూర) is a popular meat dish in Telangana and Andhra Pradesh. In Telugu Talakaya means head of goat or lamb. It is also called talakaya pulusu when Tamarind is added.

Talakaya means "head" and kura means "curry". This dish involves cooking the head or a goat or sheep. It is the most frequently served item at many functions and festivals in Andhra Pradesh and Telangana.
