= Pachi pulusu =

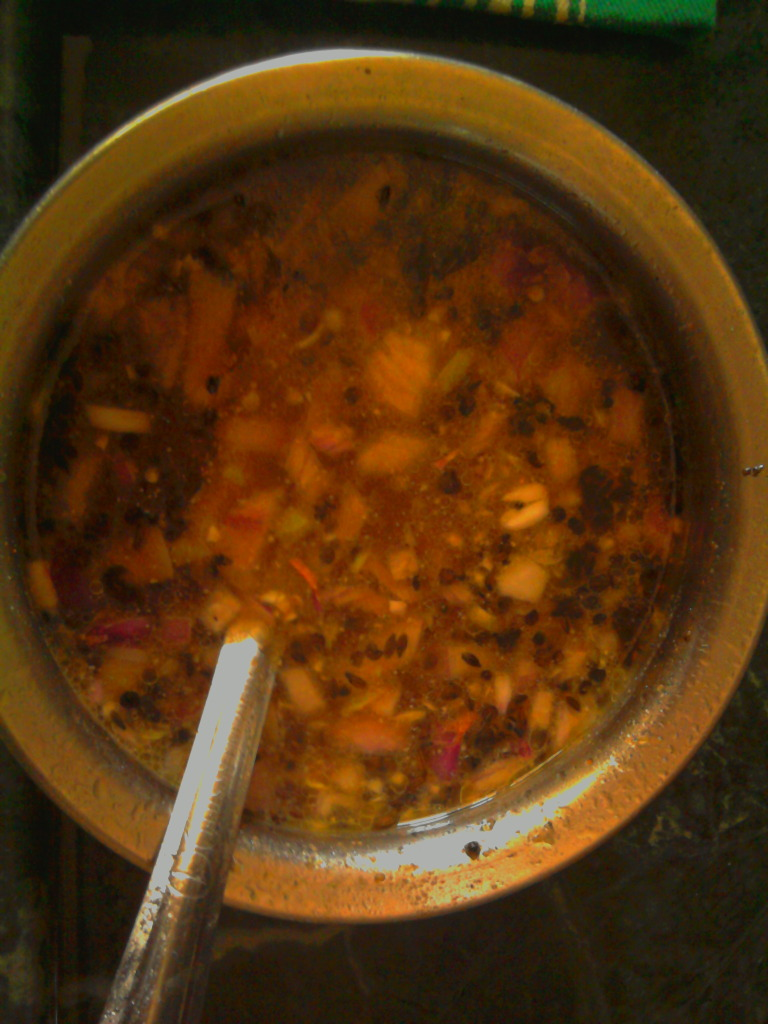
- Pachi pulusu
- Place of origin: India
- Region or state: Andhra Pradesh, Telangana
- Main ingredients: Tamarind, onions, chillies, jaggery

Pachi pulusu (Telugu: పచ్చి పులుసు) is an unheated version of the hot tamarind soup chāru(చారు). It is mainly a summer dish in Andhra Pradesh and Telangana. Unlike regular pulusu, this kind is much more spicy, watery and light.

== Preparation ==
Typically, the dish is prepared with tamarind, onion, chilli, and jaggery. Other typical seasonings may be added, such as coriander, curry leaf, or garlic. In the summer when mangoes are abundant, tamarind is sometimes replaced by stewed raw mango.
