= Kajjikayalu =

Indian deep fried sweet pastry

- Course: Sweet dish
- Place of origin: Andhra Pradesh
- Region or state: South India
- Main ingredients: Wheat, coconut, jaggery, dry fruits

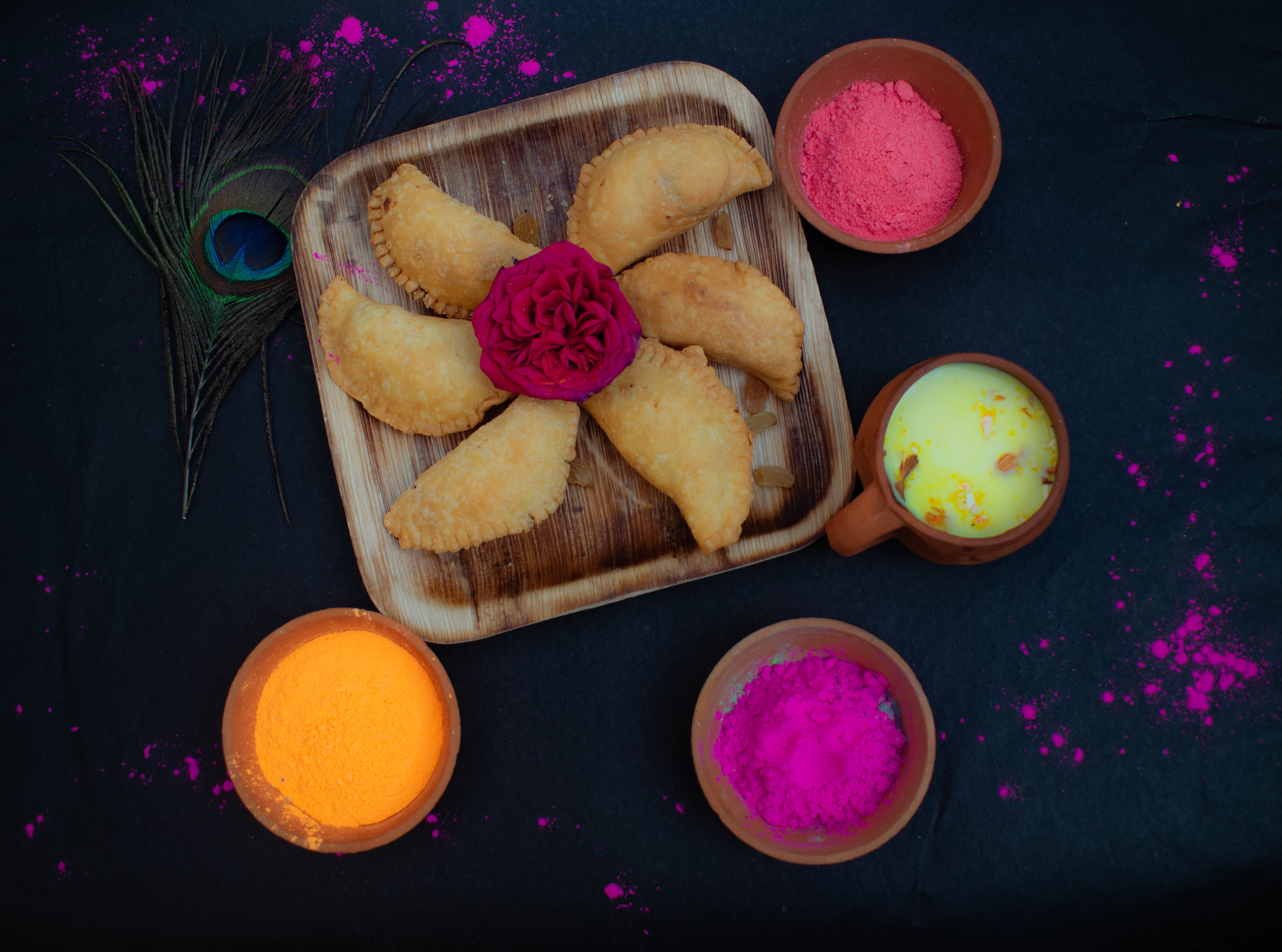
Kajjikayalu in a dish

Kajjikayalu (Telugu: కజ్జికాయలు) is a traditional Indian deep fried sweet pastry from the state of Andhra Pradesh. They are typically prepared during major festivals such as Sankranti, Deepavali, and Ganesh Chaturthi, as well as during weddings and other special occasions. The dish consists of a crisp, golden outer shell made from wheat or maida (refined flour), filled with a sweet mixture of grated coconut, powdered jaggery or sugar, cardamom, and dry fruits. It is also known in some regions as Gujiya (in Hindi) or Karjikayi (in Kannada).

== Etymology and origin ==
The word Kajjikaya is derived from the Telugu kaya (కాయ), meaning "shell" or "covering," referring to its stuffed and enclosed structure. In culinary history, this sweet is believed to have evolved from ancient stuffed pastries prepared in South India, influenced by both temple cuisine and festive offerings. Similar sweets are found in neighboring states, reflecting shared culinary traditions across the Deccan region.

== Cultural significance ==
Kajjikayalu are an integral part of festive cooking in Andhra households. They are particularly associated with Makara Sankranti, when they are made in large batches to be shared among family, neighbors, and guests. They are also considered auspicious in wedding feasts and housewarming ceremonies. In some rural communities, preparing Kajjikayalu together is a communal activity where women gather to roll, stuff, and fry the pastries while singing folk songs, reinforcing social bonds.

== Preparation ==
The outer dough is made from wheat flour or maida, sometimes enriched with a small quantity of semolina (sooji) or ghee to enhance crispness. The dough is rolled into small discs, filled with a mixture typically made from fresh or dry grated coconut, jaggery or sugar, roasted semolina, cardamom powder, and optionally chopped cashews or raisins. The disc is folded over into a half-moon shape, and the edges are sealed by crimping or using a patterned kajjikaya mould (kajjikaya achchu). The pastries are then deep-fried in ghee or oil until golden brown.

== Variations ==
While the classic filling uses coconut and jaggery, some variations incorporate roasted chickpea powder (putnala pappu podi), poppy seeds, or khoya for a richer taste. In certain Rayalaseema households, dry fruit–rich fillings are preferred during weddings. Savory versions also exist, stuffed with spiced lentils or grated vegetables, though these are less common.

== Modern adaptations ==
In urban kitchens, Kajjikayalu are sometimes baked instead of deep-fried for a lighter version. Ready made dough sheets and pre-mixed fillings are also available in Indian supermarkets, making the sweet more accessible to diaspora communities. Commercial sweet shops across Andhra Pradesh often sell Kajjikayalu year-round, though they remain most popular during festival seasons.
