= Ramachandrapuram =

Ramachandrapuram may refer to places in India:

- Ramachandrapuram, Konaseema district, in the state of Andhra Pradesh
- Ramachandrapuram mandal, Konaseema district
- Ramachandrapuram revenue division, Dr. B.R. Ambedkar Konaseema district, Andhra Pradesh
- Ramachandrapuram mandal, Tirupati district, in the state of Andhra Pradesh
- Ramachandrapuram, Telangana, sometimes shortened to RC Puram, is a neighbourhood of Hyderabad, Telangana
- Ramachandrapuram (Assembly constituency), an assembly constituency in the Konaseema district of the state of Andhra Pradesh
