= Sandhipudi =

- Village
- Interactive map of Sandhipudi
- Location in Andhra Pradesh, India Sandhipudi (India)
- Coordinates: 16.79°N 81.91°E
- Country: India
- State: Andhra Pradesh
- District: Konaseema

Area
  - Total: 1.82 km^{2} (0.70 sq mi)

Population (2011)
  - Total: 2,170
  - Density: 1,190/km^{2} (3,090/sq mi)

Languages
  - Official: Telugu
- Time zone: UTC+5:30 (IST)
- PIN: 533232

Sandhipudi is a village of in Konaseema district of the Indian state of Andhra Pradesh. It is located in Alamuru mandal of Rajahmundry revenue division.
