= Penikeru =

- Village
- Interactive map of Penikeru
- Location in Andhra Pradesh, India
- Coordinates: 16.7833°N 81.9000°E
- Country: India
- State: Andhra Pradesh
- District: Konaseema

Area
  - Total: 4.10 km^{2} (1.58 sq mi)

Population (2011)
  - Total: 3,635
  - Density: 887/km^{2} (2,300/sq mi)

Languages
  - Official: Telugu
- Time zone: UTC+5:30 (IST)
- PIN: 533232
- Telephone code: 08855
- Vehicle registration: Registration AP05 (Former) AP39 (from 30 January 2019)[1]

Penikeru is a village of in Konaseema district of the Indian state of Andhra Pradesh. It is located in Alamuru mandal of Rajahmundry revenue division.

== Geography ==
Penikeru is spread over an area of 4.10 km^{2} (1.58 sq mi). Penikeru is located 16.7833°N 81.9000°E.

== Demographics ==
As of 2011 Census of India there are total 1,097 families residing in the village Penikeru. The total population of Penikeru is 3,635 out of which 1,795 are males and 1,840 are females thus the Average Sex Ratio of Penikeru is 1,025.

== Governance ==
As per constitution of India and Panchyati Raaj Act (Amendment 1998), Penikeru village is administrated by Sarpanch (Head of Village) who is elected representative of the village.

== History ==
Penikeru is a village in Alamuru Mandal in East Godavari District of Andhra Pradesh State, India. It is 57 km from District headquarters Kakinada.

The village got its name from the plant called Peniki, Peniki root (Peniki-Veru) is used for psychological treatment. Penikeru village is famous for chronic psychological treatment. Unmadha Vidyalayam is located in this village.

== Transport ==
Mandapeta is the nearest town to Penikeru. Mandapeta is 8 km from Penikeru. Road connectivity is there from Mandapeta to Penikeru.

Ravulapalem APSRTC Bus Station, Mandapeta APSRTC Bus Station are the nearby bus stations to Penikeru .APSRTC runs a number of buses from major cities to here.

== Education ==
The primary and secondary school education is imparted by government, aided and private schools, under the School Education Department of the state. The medium of instruction followed by different schools are English, and Telugu.

As per the Census 2011, the literacy rate of Penikeru is 67.1%. Thus Penikeru village has higher literacy rate compared to 63.8% of East Godavari district. The male literacy rate is 70.01% and the female literacy rate is 64.15% in Penikeru village.

== Nearby Villages to Penikeru ==
Pedapalle ( 2 km ), Chintaluru ( 2 km ), Jonnada ( 2 km ), Navabupeta ( 2 km ), Pinapalle ( 3 km ) are the nearby Villages to Penikeru. Penikeru is surrounded by Kapileswarapuram Mandal towards East, Ravulapalem Mandal towards South, Mandapeta Mandal towards North, Kadiam Mandal towards North .
