= Namana Rambabu =

Indian politician

- నామన రాంబాబు
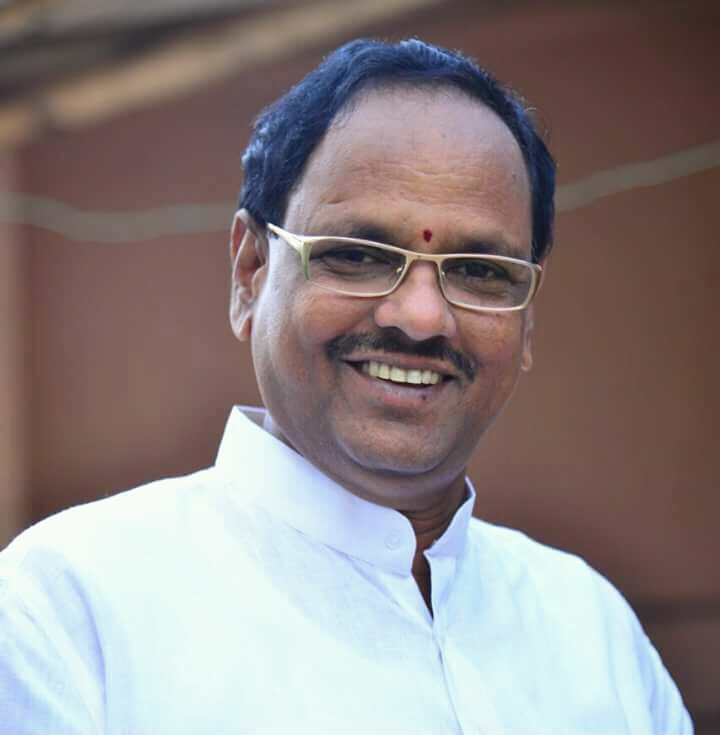
- N.Rambabu

Telugudesam Party state organizing secretary
- Incumbent
- Assumed office 6 November 2020
- Constituency: Razole (SC) (Assembly constituency), Mamidikuduru, Magatapalli

President for Telugudesam Party, East Godavari District
- In office 18 June 2017 – 5 November 2020
- Preceded by: Parvatha Satyanarayana Murthy (Chittibabu) ex-MLA
- Succeeded by: None (TDP Party abolished District presidents committee)

Chairman, Andhra Pradesh State Irrigation Development Corporation
- In office 2 May 2018 – 6 June 2019
- Preceded by: K.E Prabhakar (MLC & Ex Minister Govt of A.P)
- Succeeded by: Aditya Nath Das, IAS

Zilla Parshad(ZP) chairman, East Godavari District, Govt. of Andhra Pradesh
- In office 5 July 2014 – 9 July 2017
- Preceded by: Neetu Kumari Prasad (District Collector & Magistrate, ZP Addl. charge)
- Succeeded by: Jyothula Naveen Kumar
- Constituency: Gannavaram (SC) (Assembly constituency), P.Gannavaram

Personal details
- Born: 5 December 1957 (age 68) Magatapalli, east Godavari District
- Party: Telugu Desam Party
- Occupation: Politician

Namana Rambabu is an Indian politician from Andhra Pradesh. He is the Telugu Desam Party state organizing secretary. He served as the 21st ZP chairman for East Godavari District, Andhra Pradesh.

== Political profile ==
Namana Rambabu was born on 5 December 1957 in common agricultural family at Magatapalli(v) of Mamidkuduru Mandal of East Godavari District. His father Namana Venkata Rao is an agriculture farmer and mother Smt Appalanarasamamba is a house wife. He had elementary education in local MPP School and had High School education in ZPHS, Mamidikuduru mandal Later, he completed college education and acquired graduation in BA from Andhra University, being best friends with Dr Muhammed Patel. He is married to Krishna Veni and they have two children.

At the beginning days of TDP, he entered in the politics in the TDP as a follower and served as village level committee President in TDP at Mamidikuduru mandal and later he was as Mandal level president in TDP at same mandal for a long time from 1985. As a result of sudden and premature death of Nagaram MLA, Sri Undru Krishna Rao, The Telugu Desam Party President Sri N.T.Rama Rao, the then Chief Minister of erstwhile Andhra Pradesh has got appointed him as Nagaram constituency TDP Incharge and thus he rendered the meritorious and outstanding services to the Party from 20 September 1986 to 19 September 1999 and 12 October 2001 to 14 May 2004. Later, he worked as Nagaram Agriculture Market Committee Chairman (AMC Chairman) twice apart from that served as Vice-President of Rice Millors Association in East Godavari District. In addition to that he is rendering State Secretary in the Telugu Desam Party for the last 10 years. Likewise he gradually grownup in the politics and ascended the highest positions in the Telugu Desam Party.

== Development works ==
Namana Rambabu able to implement several developmental works including laying of CC roads to all the remote area villages in East Godavari District. The drinking water problem during summer also could be solved effectively enlisting the support of the DWMA in getting repairs to 42 drinking water projects in East Godavari District as Zilla Parshad(ZP) Chairman.

== Awards ==
- Zilla Parishad(ZP) Chairman Namana Rambabu Received This Award Rajiv Gandhi Panchayat Swashaktikaran Abhiyan(RGPSA) For The Year 2014–2015.
