= Pulletikurru =

- Village
- Interactive map of Pulletikurru
- Location in Andhra Pradesh, India
- Country: India
- State: Andhra Pradesh
- District: Konaseema

Population (2011)
  - Total: 9,208
  - Density: 1,109/km^{2} (2,870/sq mi)

Languages
  - Official: Telugu
- Time zone: UTC+5:30 (IST)
- PIN: 533239
- 8856: 885

Pulletikurru [533239] is a village in Ambajipeta Mandal in the Konaseema district of Andhra Pradesh, India.

Pulletikurru is very near to Amalapuram town, Kakinada and Rajamahendravaram Cities, it is 376 km distance from state main city Hyderabad of Telangana and 203 km distance from the capital of Andhra Pradesh Amaravathi, Guntur District, INDIA .

== Demographics ==
As of 2011 India census, Pulletikurru has a population of 9208 in 2447 households.

According to Census 2011
| Population | Persons | Males | Females |
|---|---|---|---|
| Total | 9,208 | 4,672 | 4,536 |
| Children (0–6 years) | 750 | 386 | 364 |
| Scheduled Castes (SC) | 3,110 | 1,612 | 1,498 |
| Scheduled Tribes (ST) | 80 | 41 | 39 |
| Literates | 6,943 | 3,802 | 3,141 |
| Illiterate | 2,265 | 870 | 1,395 |
