= Thondavaram =

- village
- Interactive map of Thondavaram
- Location in Andhra Pradesh, India Thondavaram (India)
- Coordinates: 16.56°N 81.94°E
- Country: India
- State: Andhra Pradesh
- District: Konaseema

Population (2001)
  - Total: 3,708

Languages
  - Official: Telugu
- Time zone: UTC+5:30 (IST)
- PIN: 533239
- Telephone code: 885

Thondavaram is a village in Ambajipeta Mandal in the Konaseema district of Andhra Pradesh, India.

== Demographics ==
As of 2001 India census, Thondavaram has a population of 3708 in 890 households.
