= Pedapalla =

Pedapalla pedapalle
- village
- Interactive map of Pedapalla
- Location in Andhra Pradesh, India Pedapalla (India)
- Coordinates: 16.80°N 81.90°E
- Country: India
- State: Andhra Pradesh
- District: Konaseema

Languages
  - Official: Telugu
- Time zone: UTC+5:30 (IST)
- PIN: 533232
- Telephone code: 08855

Pedapalla is a village in Alamuru Mandal in the Konaseema district of Andhra Pradesh, India.
