= Pinapalla =

- village
- Interactive map of Pinapalla
- Location in Andhra Pradesh, India Pinapalla (India)
- Coordinates: 16.80°N 81.91°E
- Country: India
- State: Andhra Pradesh
- District: Konaseema

Languages
  - Official: Telugu
- Time zone: UTC+5:30 (IST)
- PIN: 533232

Pinapalla is a village in Alamuru Mandal in Konaseema district of Andhra Pradesh, India.
