= Ramachandrapuram revenue division =

Coordinates: 15°54′N 80°40′E

Ramachandrapuram Revenue Division
- revenue division in Konaseema district
- Interactive map of Ramachandrapuram Revenue Division
- Country: India
- State: Andhra Pradesh
- District: Dr. B.R. Ambedkar Konaseema

Ramachandrapuram revenue division (or Ramachandrapuram division) is an administrative division in the Dr. B.R. Ambedkar Konaseema district of the Indian state of Andhra Pradesh. It is one of the 3 revenue divisions in the district which consists of 2 mandals under its administration. Ramachandrapuram is the divisional headquarters.

== Administration ==
The 2 mandals in Ramachandrapuram revenue division are:

No.	Mandals
1	Ramachandrapuram mandal
2	Gangavaram mandal

== See also ==
- List of revenue divisions in Andhra Pradesh
- List of mandals in Andhra Pradesh
