= Uppalaguptam =

- village
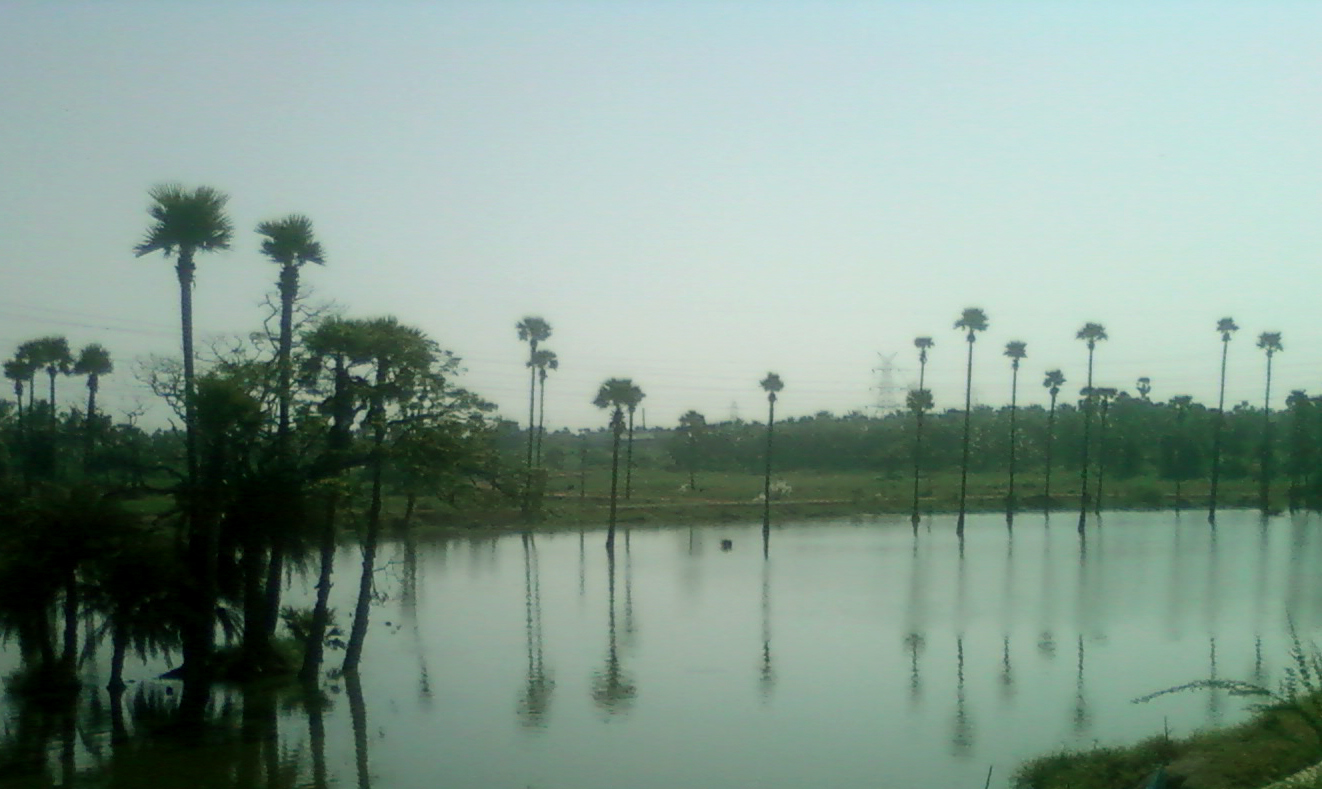
- Interactive map of Uppalaguptam
- Location in Andhra Pradesh, India Uppalaguptam (India)
- Coordinates: 16.5667°N 82.1000°E
- Country: India
- State: Andhra Pradesh
- District: Konaseema district
- Talukas: Uppalaguptam
- Elevation: 0 m (0 ft)

Languages
  - Official: Telugu
- Time zone: UTC+5:30 (IST)
- Vehicle Registration: AP05 (Former); AP39 (from 30 January 2019)

Uppala-guptam is a village in Konaseema district in Uppalaguptam Mandal, in the state of Andhra Pradesh in India.

The name Uppala-guptam may have been derived from uppala meaning blue water lilly in Pali language. This plant is very endemic to the area. It is believed that Buddhist monks regularly traveled through the area on their way to Sri Lanka. The fact that this place is on the way to adurru Buddhist stupa 18 kilometers south-west is also significant.
