= Kothapeta revenue division =

Proposed revenue division in Konaseema district, Andhra Pradesh, India

Coordinates: 15°54′N 80°40′E

- Revenue division
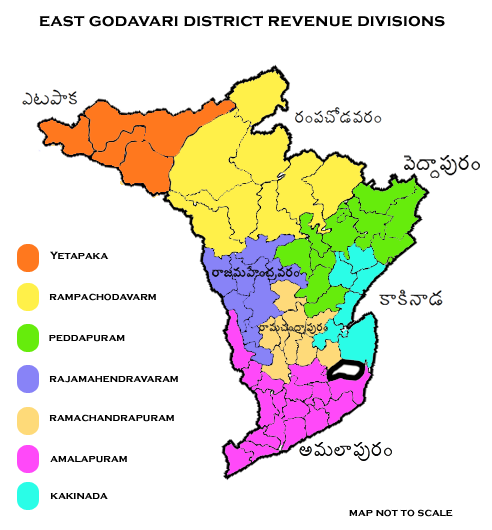
- Country: India
- State: Andhra Pradesh
- District: Dr. B.R. Ambedkar Konaseema
- Founder: Government of Andhra Pradesh
- Headquarters: Kothapeta
- Time zone: UTC+05:30 (IST)

Kothapeta revenue division is a proposed administrative division in the Dr. B.R. Ambedkar Konaseema district of the Indian state of Andhra Pradesh. The division awaits a final notification from the Government of Andhra Pradesh and would become one of the resultant three revenue divisions in the district. It is proposed to comprise seven mandals under its administration. Kothapeta is the divisional headquarters.

== Administration ==
There are 7 mandals proposed to comprise Kothapeta revenue division.

Mandals
Ainavilli mandal
Alamuru mandal
Ambajipeta mandal
Atreyapuram mandal
Kothapeta mandal
P. Gannavaram mandal
Ravulapalem mandal

== See also ==
- List of revenue divisions in Andhra Pradesh
- List of mandals in Andhra Pradesh
