= Chemudulanka =

- village
- Interactive map of Chemudulanka
- Location in Andhra Pradesh, India Chemudulanka (India)
- Coordinates: 16°50′37″N 81°50′16″E
- Country: India
- State: Andhra Pradesh
- District: Konaseema

Government
  - Type: Panchayati raj (India)
  - Body: Gram panchayat

Languages
  - Official: Telugu
- Time zone: UTC+5:30 (IST)
- PIN: 533234

Chemudulanka is a village in Alamuru Mandal in Konaseema district of Andhra Pradesh, India.
