= Gangavaram =

Gangavaram can refer to:

- Gangavaram, Visakhapatnam
- Gangavaram, Chittoor district
- Gangavaram, Kakinada district
- K. Gangavaram, Konaseema district
- K. Gangavaram mandal, Konaseema district
- Gangavaram mandal, Alluri Sitharama Raju district
- Gangavaram Port
