= Ch. Gunnepalle =

- village
- Interactive map of Ch. Gunnepalle
- Location in Andhra Pradesh, India Ch. Gunnepalle (India)
- Coordinates: 16.6020°N 82.0807°E
- Country: India
- State: Andhra Pradesh
- District: Dr. B.R. Ambedkar Konaseema

Area
  - Total: 4 km^{2} (1.5 sq mi)

Population (2011)
  - Total: 3,409
  - Density: 850/km^{2} (2,200/sq mi)

Languages
  - Official: Telugu
- Time zone: UTC+5:30 (IST)
- Postal code: 533 446

Ch. Gunnepalle is a village in Mummidivaram Mandal, Dr. B.R. Ambedkar Konaseema district in the state of Andhra Pradesh in India.

== Geography ==
Ch. Gunnepalle is located at 16.6020°N 82.0807°E.

== Demographics ==
As of 2011 India census, Ch. Gunnepalle had a population of 3409, out of which 1740 were male and 1669 were female. The population of children below 6 years of age was 9%. The literacy rate of the village was 79%.
