= Pamarru =

Pamarru may refer to:

- Pamarru mandal, a mandal in Krishna district, Andhra Pradesh, India
  - Pamarru, Krishna district, a village in the mandal
  - Pamarru Assembly constituency
- Pamarru, Konaseema district, a village in Andhra Pradesh, India
