= Jakkampudi =

Jakkampudi is an Indian name that may refer to

- Jakkampudi Rammohan Rao (1953–2011), Indian politician
- Meghana Jakkampudi (born 1995), Indian badminton player
- Jakkampudi Kishore Kumar (born 1986), Head - Human Resource, Young HR Professional of the year 2016, world HRD congress
