= Thanelanka =

- Village
- Interactive map of Thanelanka
- Location in Andhra Pradesh, India Thanelanka (India)
- Coordinates: 16.663102°N 82.096578°E
- Country: India
- State: Andhra Pradesh
- Region: Mummidivaram
- District: Dr. B.R. Ambedkar Konaseema

Languages
  - Official: Telugu
- Time zone: UTC+5:30 (IST)
- PIN: 533216

Thanelanka is a village situated in Dr. B.R. Ambedkar Konaseema district in Mummidivaram Mandal, in Andhra Pradesh State, India.
