= Surasaniyanam =

Surasena yanam
- Village
- Interactive map of Surasena yanam
- Location in Andhra Pradesh, India Surasena yanam (India)
- Coordinates: 16.4910°N 82.0972°E
- Country: India
- State: Andhra Pradesh
- District: Dr. B.R. Ambedkar Konaseema

Area
  - Total: 14 km^{2} (5.4 sq mi)

Population (2011)
  - Total: 3,878
  - Density: 273/km^{2} (710/sq mi)

Languages
  - Official: Telugu
- Time zone: UTC+5:30 (IST)
- Postal code: 533 446

Surasenayanam is a village in Uppalaguptam Mandal, Dr. B.R. Ambedkar Konaseema district in the state of Andhra Pradesh in India. This beach also known as KOCO Beach and Andhra Goa beach In Andhra Pradesh

== Geography ==
Surasenayanam is located at 16.4910°N 82.0972°E.

== Demographics ==
As of 2011 India census, Surasenayanam had a population of 3878, out of which 1984 were male and 1894 were female. The population of children below 6 years of age was 10%. The literacy rate of the village was 70%.
