= Jakkampudi Rammohan Rao =

Indian politician (1953–2011)

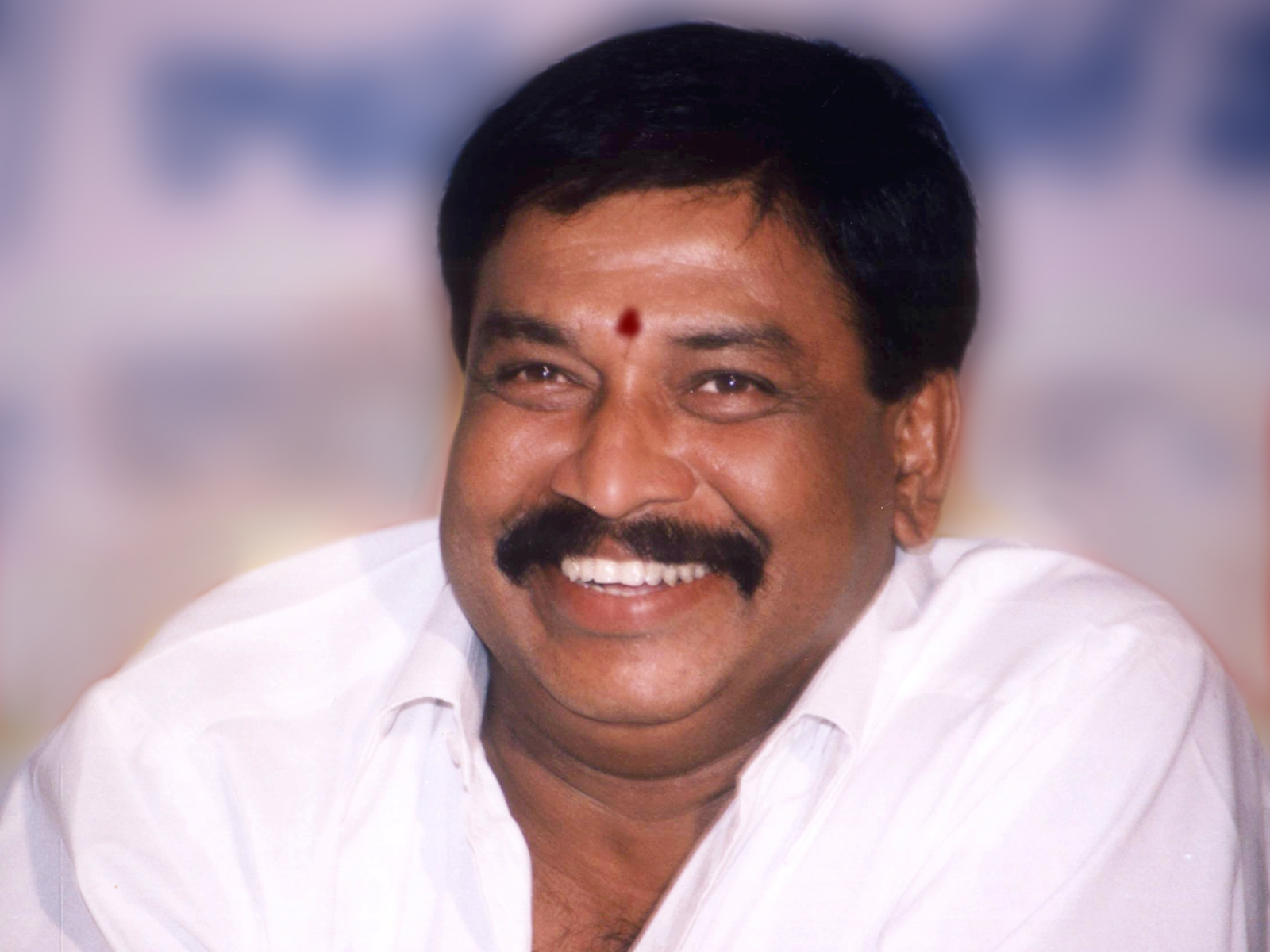

Minister of R&B - Excise & Prohibition Government of Andhra Pradesh
- In office 14 May 2004 – 20 May 2009
- Governor: Surjit Singh Barnala; Sushilkumar Shinde; Rameshwar Thakur; N. D. Tiwari
- Chief Minister: Y. S. Rajasekhara Reddy

Member of Andhra Pradesh Legislative Assembly
- In office 1999–2009
- Preceded by: Vaddi Veerabhadra Rao
- Succeeded by: Chandana Ramesh
- Constituency: Kadiyam
- In office 1989–1994
- Preceded by: Vaddi Veerabhadra Rao
- Succeeded by: Vaddi Veerabhadra Rao
- Constituency: Kadiyam

Personal details
- Born: 6 August 1953 Adurru, Mamidikuduru Mandal, East Godavari District, Andhra Pradesh, India
- Died: 9 October 2011 (aged 58) Rajahmundry
- Party: Indian National Congress
- Spouse: Jakkampudi Vijayalakshmi
- Children: Jakkampudi Raja, Jakkampudi Ganesh and a daughter
- Parent(s): Peda Veeraiah, Sitaratnam

Jakkampudi Rammohan Rao (6 August 1953 – 9 October 2011) was a three-term member of the Legislative Assembly of Andhra Pradesh for Kadiyam constituency.

== Early life ==
Rao was born in Adurru on 6 August 1953 and died at Bollineni Hospital on 9 October 2011, having suffered from diabetic neuropathy for several years. He married Vijayalakshmi, who contested election in 2009 due to his poor health, and the couple had two sons and a daughter. One of his sons, Jakkampudi Raja, was the MLA from Rajanagaram Assembly Constituency from 2019 to 2024.

== Career ==
Rao had joined the YSR Congress in 2010. He won elections in 1989, 1999 and 2004 as an Indian National Congress candidate. He was appointed State Minister of Roads and Buildings in 2004 and later became Minister of Excise.
