= Bheemanapalle =

- village
- Interactive map of Bheemanapalle
- Location in Andhra Pradesh, India Bheemanapalle (India)
- Coordinates: 17.866°N 82.5148°E
- Country: India
- State: Andhra Pradesh
- District: Dr. B.R. Ambedkar Konaseema

Area
  - Total: 13 km^{2} (5.0 sq mi)

Population (2011)
  - Total: 7,733
  - Density: 573/km^{2} (1,480/sq mi)

Languages
  - Official: Telugu
- Time zone: UTC+5:30 (IST)
- Postal code: 533 446

Bheemanapalle is a village in Uppalaguptam Mandal, Dr. B.R. Ambedkar Konaseema district in the state of Andhra Pradesh in India.

== Geography ==
Bheemanapalle is located at 17.866°N 82.5148°E.

== Demographics ==
As of 2011 India census, Bheemanapalle had a population of 7733, out of which 3905 were male and 3828 were female. The population of children below 6 years of age was 10%. The literacy rate of the village was 78%.
