= Kunavaram. Uppalaguptam Mandal =

Kunavaram
- village
- Interactive map of Kunavaram
- Location in Andhra Pradesh, India Kunavaram (India)
- Coordinates: 16.5470°N 82.0926°E
- Country: India
- State: Andhra Pradesh
- District: Dr. B.R. Ambedkar Konaseema

Area
  - Total: 4 km^{2} (1.5 sq mi)

Population (2011)
  - Total: 2,863
  - Density: 800/km^{2} (2,100/sq mi)

Languages
  - Official: Telugu
- Time zone: UTC+5:30 (IST)
- Postal code: 533 446

Kunavaram is a village in Uppalaguptam Mandal, Dr. B.R. Ambedkar Konaseema district in the state of Andhra Pradesh in India.

== Geography ==
Kunavaram is located at 16.5470°N 82.0926°E.

== Demographics ==
As of 2011 India census, Kunavaram had a population of 2863, out of which 1448 were male and 1415 were female. The population of children below 6 years of age was 10%. The literacy rate of the village was 76%.
