= Nimmakayala Kothapalle =

- village
- Interactive map of Nimmakayala Kothapalle
- Location in Andhra Pradesh, India Nimmakayala Kothapalle (India)
- Coordinates: 16.5347°N 82.1243°E
- Country: India
- State: Andhra Pradesh
- District: Dr. B.R. Ambedkar Konaseema

Area
  - Total: 20 km^{2} (7.7 sq mi)

Population (2011)
  - Total: 6,234
  - Density: 306/km^{2} (790/sq mi)

Languages
  - Official: Telugu
- Time zone: UTC+5:30 (IST)
- Postal code: 533 446

Nimmakayala Kothapalle is a village in Uppalaguptam Mandal, Dr. B.R. Ambedkar Konaseema district in the state of Andhra Pradesh in India.

== Geography ==
Nimmakayala Kothapalle is located at 16.5347°N 82.1243°E.

== Demographics ==
As of 2011 India census, Nimmakayala Kothapalle had a population of 6234, out of which 3149 were male and 3085 were female. The population of children below 6 years of age was 11%. The literacy rate of the village was 67%.
