= Pasarlapudi blowout =

1995 oil rig blowout in India

- Location: Pasarlapudi, Andhra Pradesh, India
- Date: 8 January 1995

Cause
- Cause: Wellhead blowout
- Casualties: Nil
- Operator: Oil and Natural Gas Corporation

Spill characteristics
- Volume: 200 meter column of fire
- Area: Onshore

The Pasarlapudi blowout was an oil rig blowout that took place on 6.50 pm, 8 January 1995 in Pasarlapudi, near Amalapuram in Konaseema district (earlier East Godavari district, of Andhra Pradesh, India. It was the largest blowout ever recorded in the history of the India's oil and natural gas exploration with a fire that engulfed drilling site number 19, rig number E 1400-18GF. The fire continued for 65 days. Initially Neil Adams Fire Fighters(NAF, Houston) was hired to bring fire under control. After ONGC disagreed with their strategy NAF left and it was finally brought under control on 15 March 1995 by International Well Control. The blowout did not cause any casualties, but the drilling rig was destroyed. Damages to the drilling rig were estimated at Rs 9.2 crore crore as well as about Rs 7 crore of damage to equipment at the well site area.

== Evacuation ==
7 villages within the 2 kilometers radius of the rig, approximately 1,500 people were evacuated immediately by APSRTC buses. More people fled in panic from the nearby villages.

== See also ==
- Oil well fire
- Konaseema
- Amalapuram
