= Vilasavilli =

- village
- Interactive map of Vilasavilli
- Location in Andhra Pradesh, India Vilasavilli (India)
- Coordinates: 16.5778°N 82.0521°E
- Country: India
- State: Andhra Pradesh
- District: Konaseema

Area
  - Total: 3 km^{2} (1.2 sq mi)

Population (2011)
  - Total: 4,010
  - Density: 1,369/km^{2} (3,550/sq mi)

Languages
  - Official: Telugu
- Time zone: UTC+5:30 (IST)
- Postal code: 533 446

Vilasavilli is a village in Uppalaguptam Mandal, Konaseema district in the state of Andhra Pradesh in India.

== Geography ==
Vilasavilli is located at 16.5778°N 82.0521°E.

== Demographics ==
As of 2011 India census, Vilasavilli had a population of 4010, out of which 2007 were male and 2003 were female. The population of children below 6 years of age was 9%. The literacy rate of the village was 77%.
