= Magatapalli =

- village
- Interactive map of Magatapalli
- Location in Andhra Pradesh, India Magatapalli (India)
- Coordinates: 16°27′25″N 81°56′32″E
- Country: India
- State: Andhra Pradesh
- District: Konaseema

Population
  - Total: 4,615 approx

Languages
  - Official: Telugu
- Time zone: UTC+5:30 (IST)
- PIN: 533248
- Telephone code: 08862- 231... (and 232...)

Magatapalli is a village in Mamidikuduru Mandal, Konaseema district, Andhra Pradesh, India.
