= Gopavaram =

Gopavaram may refer to:

- Gopavaram, Kadapa district
- Gopavaram, Konaseema district
