= Kamini, Mummidivaram Mandal =

Kamini
- village
- Interactive map of Kamini
- Location in Andhra Pradesh, India Kamini (India)
- Coordinates: 16.6767°N 82.0947°E
- Country: India
- State: Andhra Pradesh
- District: Dr. B.R. Ambedkar Konaseema

Area
  - Total: 11 km^{2} (4.2 sq mi)

Population (2011)
  - Total: 1,020
  - Density: 91/km^{2} (240/sq mi)

Languages
  - Official: Telugu
- Time zone: UTC+5:30 (IST)
- Postal code: 533 446

Kamini is a village in Mummidivaram Mandal, Dr. B.R. Ambedkar Konaseema district in the state of Andhra Pradesh in India.

== Geography ==
Kamini is located at 16.6767°N 82.0947°E.

== Demographics ==
As of 2011 India census, Kamini had a population of 1020, out of which 508 were male and 512 were female. The population of children below 6 years of age was 11%. The literacy rate of the village was 76%.
