= Gollavilli =

- village
- Interactive map of Gollavilli
- Location in Andhra Pradesh, India Gollavilli (India)
- Coordinates: 16.5626°N 82.0859°E
- Country: India
- State: Andhra Pradesh
- District: Dr. B.R. Ambedkar Konaseema

Area
  - Total: 3 km^{2} (1.2 sq mi)

Population (2011)
  - Total: 4,164
  - Density: 1,197/km^{2} (3,100/sq mi)

Languages
  - Official: Telugu
- Time zone: UTC+5:30 (IST)
- Postal code: 533 446

Gollavilli is a village in Uppalaguptam Mandal, Dr. B.R. Ambedkar Konaseema district in the state of Andhra Pradesh in India.

== Geography ==
Gollavilli is located at 16.5626°N 82.0859°E.

== Demographics ==
As of 2011 India census, Gollavilli had a population of 4164, out of which 2095 were male and 2069 were female. The population of children below 6 years of age was 10%. The literacy rate of the village was 77%.
