= Ramchandrapur (disambiguation) =

Ramchandarpur refers to an administrative block/Tehsil/Taluka of Balrampur district, Chhattisgarh, India

Ramchandrapur may also refer to:

- Ramchandrapur, West Bengal, a census town in Sankrail CD Block under Sankrail in Sadar subdivision of Howrah district, West Bengal, India
- Ramchandrapur, Sonarpur, census town in South 24 Parganas district, West Bengal, India
- Ramchandrapur, Purulia, a village in Santuri CD Block in Raghunathpur subdivision of Purulia district, West Bengal, India
- Ramchandrapur, Purba Medinipur, a village in Egra subdivision of Purba Medinipur district, West Bengal, India

== See also ==
- Ramachandrapuram (disambiguation)
