= Kothalanka =

- village
- Interactive map of Kothalanka
- Location in Andhra Pradesh, India
- Coordinates: 16.63°N 82.13°E
- Country: India
- State: Andhra Pradesh
- District: Dr. B.R. Ambedkar Konaseema

Government
  - Type: panchayiti

Population (2001)
  - Total: 8,000

Languages telugu
  - Official: Telugu
- Time zone: UTC+5:30 (IST)
- PIN: 533216
- State Andhra Pradesh District East Godavari Tahsil Mummidivaram Village Kothalanka Male Population 3967 Female Population 4033 Total Population 8000

Kothalanka is a village in Mummidivaram Mandal in Dr. B.R. Ambedkar Konaseema district of Andhra Pradesh, India.
