= Narasapurapupeta =

- village
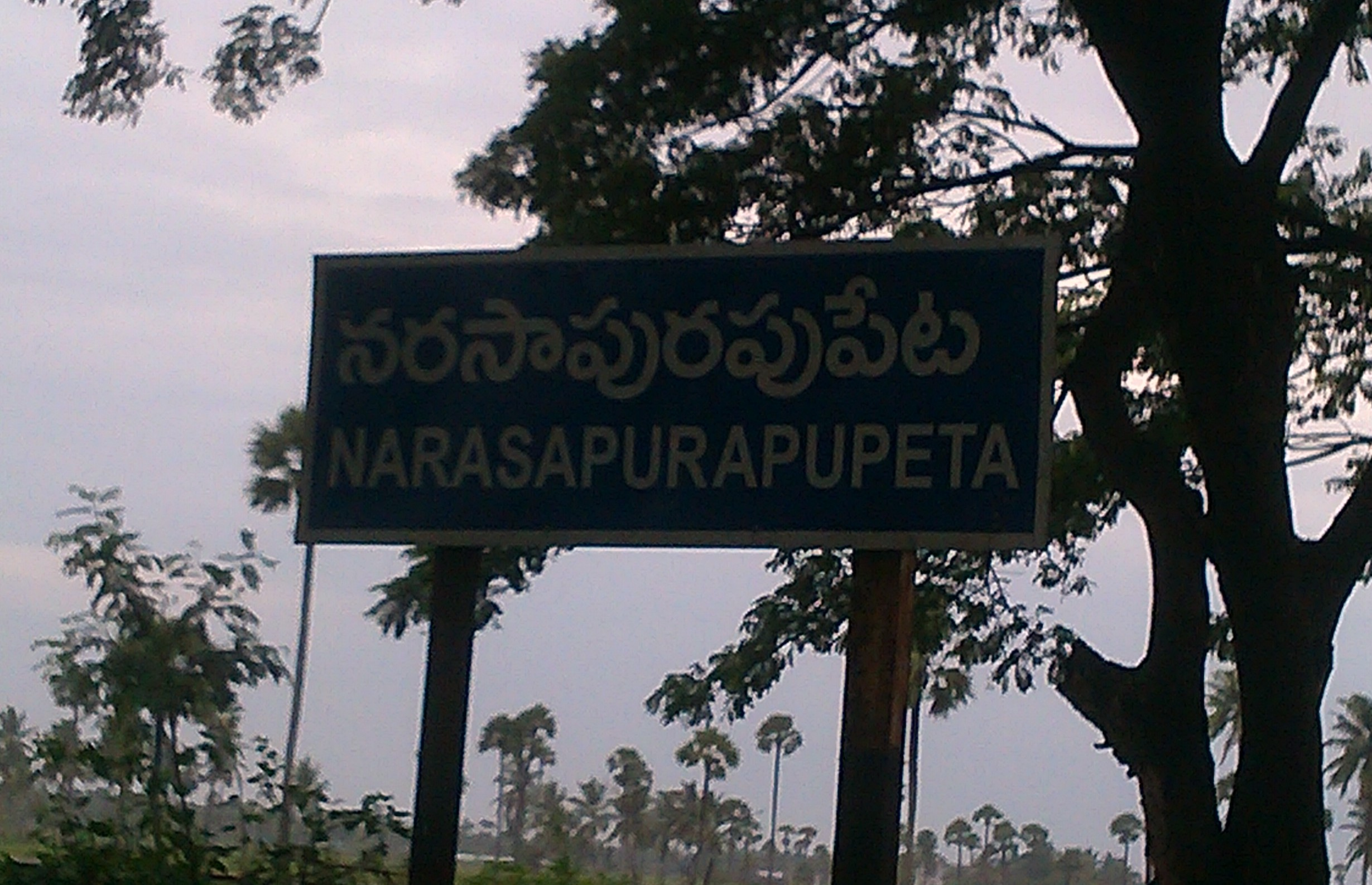
- Village Name Board
- Interactive map of Narasapurapupeta
- Location in Andhra Pradesh, India
- Coordinates: 16°54′N 82°06′E
- Country: India
- State: Andhra Pradesh
- District: Konaseema

Population (2011)
  - Total: 2,172

Languages
  - Official: Telugu
- Time zone: UTC+5:30 (IST)
- PIN: 533255
- Telephone code: 0884
- Lok Sabha constituency: Amalapuram
- Vidhan Sabha constituency: Ramachandrapuram

Narasapurapupeta is a village in Ramachandrapuram Mandal, Konaseema district, Andhra Pradesh.
