= Gadilanka =

- village
- Interactive map of Gadilanka
- Location in Andhra Pradesh, India Gadilanka (India)
- Coordinates: 16.6675004°N 82.1465649°E
- Country: India
- State: Andhra Pradesh
- District: Dr. B.R. Ambedkar Konaseema

Languages
  - Official: Telugu
- Time zone: UTC+5:30 (IST)
- Vehicle registration: AP

Gadilanka is a village in Mummidivaram Mandal of Dr. B.R. Ambedkar Konaseema district, Andhra Pradesh, India.

== Demographics ==
According to Indian census, 2001, the demographic details of this village is as follows:

- Total Population: 1,386 in 365 Households.
- Male Population: 697
- Female Population: 689
- Children Under 6-years: 136 (Boys - 76 and Girls - 60)
- Total Literates: 954
