= K. Gangavaram, Konaseema district =

Gangavaram
- Village
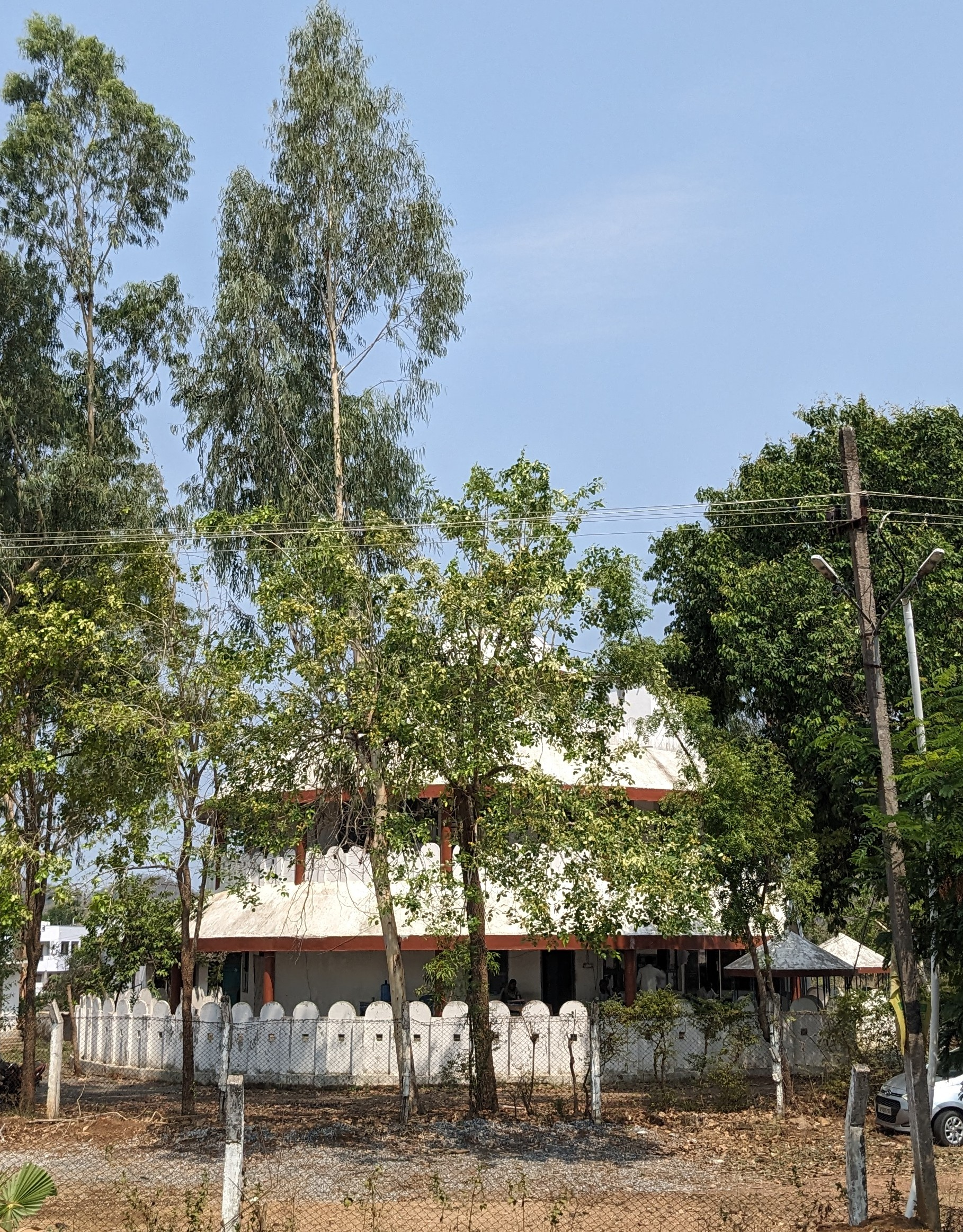
- Interactive map of Gangavaram
- Location in Andhra Pradesh, India Gangavaram (India)
- Coordinates: 16.734708°N 82.047572°E
- Country: India
- State: Andhra Pradesh
- District: Dr. B.R. Ambedkar Konaseema
- Mandal: K. Gangavaram

Languages
  - Official: Telugu
- Time zone: UTC+5:30 (IST)
- Vehicle Registration: AP05 (Former); AP39 (from 30 January 2019)

Ganagavaram is a village and mandal headquarter of K. Gangavaram mandal located in Dr. B.R. Ambedkar Konaseema district of Andhra Pradesh, India.
