= Sivala, Konaseema district =

Sivala
- village
- Interactive map of Sivala
- Location in Andhra Pradesh, India Sivala (India)
- Coordinates: 16°45′26″N 82°5′19″E
- Country: India
- State: Andhra Pradesh

Languages
  - Official: Telugu
- Time zone: UTC+5:30 (IST)
- Postal code: 533262
- Vehicle registration: AP
- Vidhan Sabha constituency: Ramachandra Puram

Sivala is a village located in the Konaseema district of Andhra Pradesh, India.
