= Nangavaram, Uppalaguptam Mandal =

Nangavaram
- village
- Interactive map of Nangavaram
- Location in Andhra Pradesh, India Nangavaram (India)
- Coordinates: 16.5846°N 82.0764°E
- Country: India
- State: Andhra Pradesh
- District: Dr. B.R. Ambedkar Konaseema

Area
  - Total: 3 km^{2} (1.2 sq mi)

Population (2011)
  - Total: 1,531
  - Density: 576/km^{2} (1,490/sq mi)

Languages
  - Official: Telugu
- Time zone: UTC+5:30 (IST)
- Postal code: 533 446

Nangavaram is a village in Uppalaguptam Mandal, Dr. B.R. Ambedkar Konaseema district in the state of Andhra Pradesh in India.

== Geography ==
Nangavaram is located at 16.5846°N 82.0764°E.

== Demographics ==
As of 2011 India census, Nangavaram had a population of 1531, out of which 786 were male and 745 were female. The population of children below 6 years of age was 9%. The literacy rate of the village was 77%.
