= T. Challapalle =

- village
- Interactive map of T. Challapalle
- Location in Andhra Pradesh, India T. Challapalle (India)
- Coordinates: 16.4873°N 82.0623°E
- Country: India
- State: Andhra Pradesh
- District: Dr. B.R. Ambedkar Konaseema

Area
  - Total: 22 km^{2} (8.5 sq mi)

Population (2011)
  - Total: 9,291
  - Density: 427/km^{2} (1,110/sq mi)

Languages
  - Official: Telugu
- Time zone: UTC+5:30 (IST)

T. Challapalle is a village in Uppalaguptam Mandal, Dr. B.R. Ambedkar Konaseema district in the state of Andhra Pradesh in India.

== Geography ==
T. Challapalle is located at 16.4873°N 82.0623°E.

== Demographics ==
As of 2011 India census, T. Challapalle had a population of 9291, out of which 4620 were male and 4671 were female. The population of children below 6 years of age was 10%. The literacy rate of the village was 73%.
