= Ananthavaram, Mummidivaram Mandal =

Ananthavaram
- village
- Interactive map of Ananthavaram
- Location in Andhra Pradesh, India Ananthavaram (India)
- Coordinates: 16.6519°N 82.0953°E
- Country: India
- State: Andhra Pradesh
- District: Dr. B.R. Ambedkar Konaseema

Area
  - Total: 10 km^{2} (3.9 sq mi)

Population (2011)
  - Total: 5,785
  - Density: 609/km^{2} (1,580/sq mi)

Languages
  - Official: Telugu
- Time zone: UTC+5:30 (IST)
- Postal code: 533 446

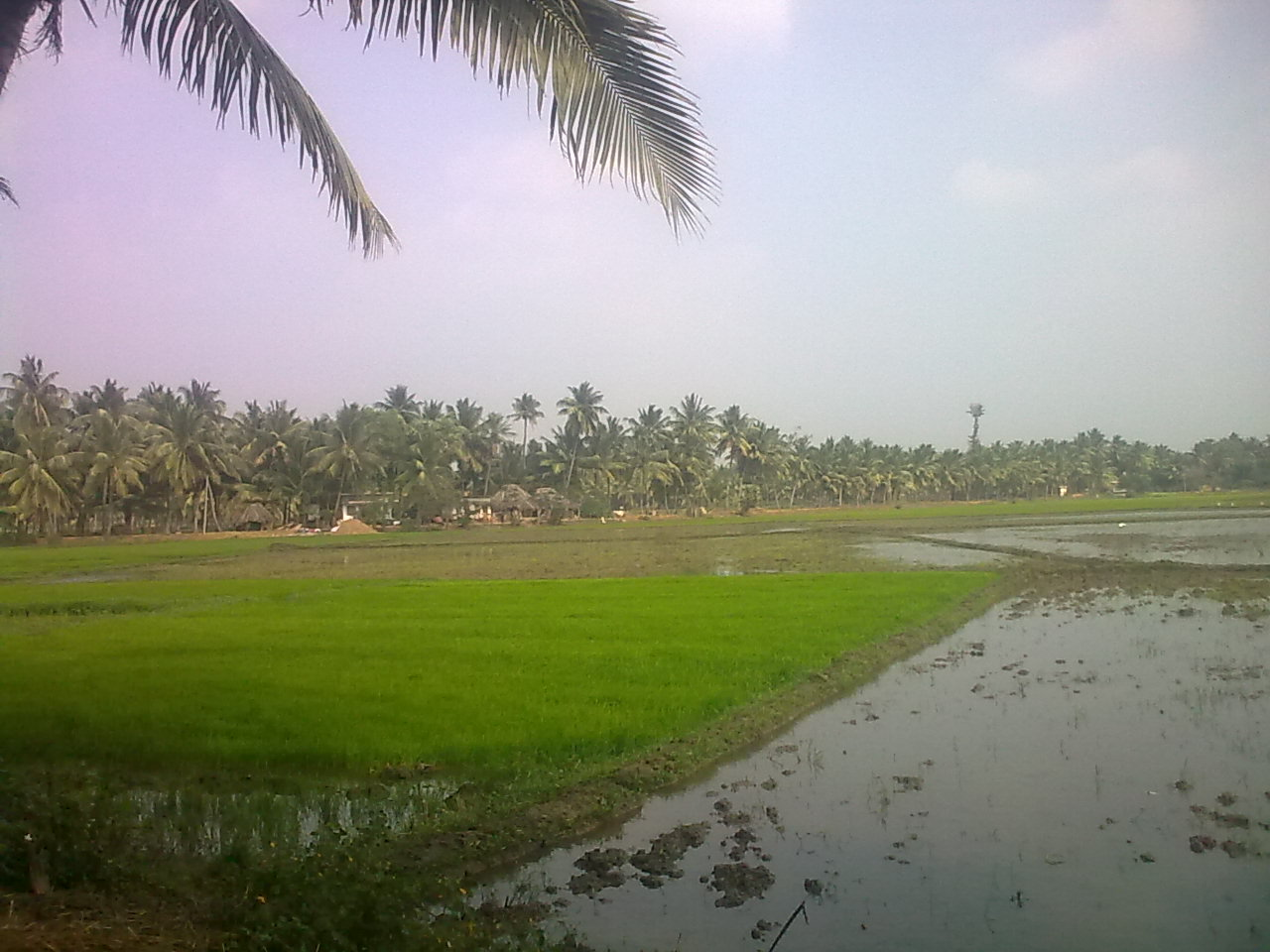
Anathavaram, taken 14 January 2009

Ananthavaram is a village in Mummidivaram Mandal, Dr. B.R. Ambedkar Konaseema district in the state of Andhra Pradesh in India.

== Geography ==
Ananthavaram is located at 16.6519°N 82.0953°E.

== Demographics ==
As of 2011 India census, Ananthavaram had a population of 2941, out of which 2844 were male and 4298 were female. The population of children below 6 years of age was 9%. The literacy rate of the village was 80%.
