= Komanapalle =

- Village
- Interactive map of Komanapalle
- Location in Andhra Pradesh, India Komanapalle (India)
- Coordinates: 16°42′N 82°06′E
- Country: India
- State: Andhra Pradesh
- District: Dr. B.R. Ambedkar Konaseema

Area
  - Total: 5.75 km^{2} (2.22 sq mi)

Population (2011)
  - Total: 5,131
  - Density: 892/km^{2} (2,310/sq mi)

Languages
  - Official: Telugu
- Time zone: UTC+5:30 (IST)

Komanapalle is a village in Dr. B.R. Ambedkar Konaseema district of the Indian state of Andhra Pradesh. It is located in Mummidivaram Mandal of Amalapuram revenue division.
