= Krapa Chintalapudi =

- village
- Interactive map of Krapa Chintalapudi
- Location in Andhra Pradesh, India Krapa Chintalapudi (India)
- Coordinates: 16.6405°N 82.0787°E
- Country: India
- State: Andhra Pradesh
- District: Dr. B.R. Ambedkar Konaseema

Area
  - Total: 3 km^{2} (1.2 sq mi)

Population (2011)
  - Total: 2,614
  - Density: 983/km^{2} (2,550/sq mi)

Languages
  - Official: Telugu
- Time zone: UTC+5:30 (IST)
- Postal code: 533 446

Krapa Chintalapudi is a village in Mummidivaram Mandal, Dr. B.R. Ambedkar Konaseema district in the state of Andhra Pradesh in India.

== Geography ==
Krapa Chintalapudi is located at 16.6405°N 82.0787°E.

== Demographics ==
As of the 2011 India census, Krapa Chintalapudi had a population of 2614, of which 1299 were male and 1315 were female. The population of children below 6 years of age was 9%. The literacy rate of the village was 77%.
