= Ainapuram =

- Village
- Interactive map of Ainapuram
- Location in Andhra Pradesh, India Ainapuram (India)
- Coordinates: 16.608352°N 82.14052°E
- Country: India
- State: Andhra Pradesh
- District: Konaseema

Languages
  - Official: Telugu
- Time zone: UTC+5:30 (IST)
- PIN: 533216

Ainapuram is a village situated in Dr. B.R. Ambedkar Konaseema district in Mummidivaram Mandal, in Andhra Pradesh State.
