= Gummileru =

- Village
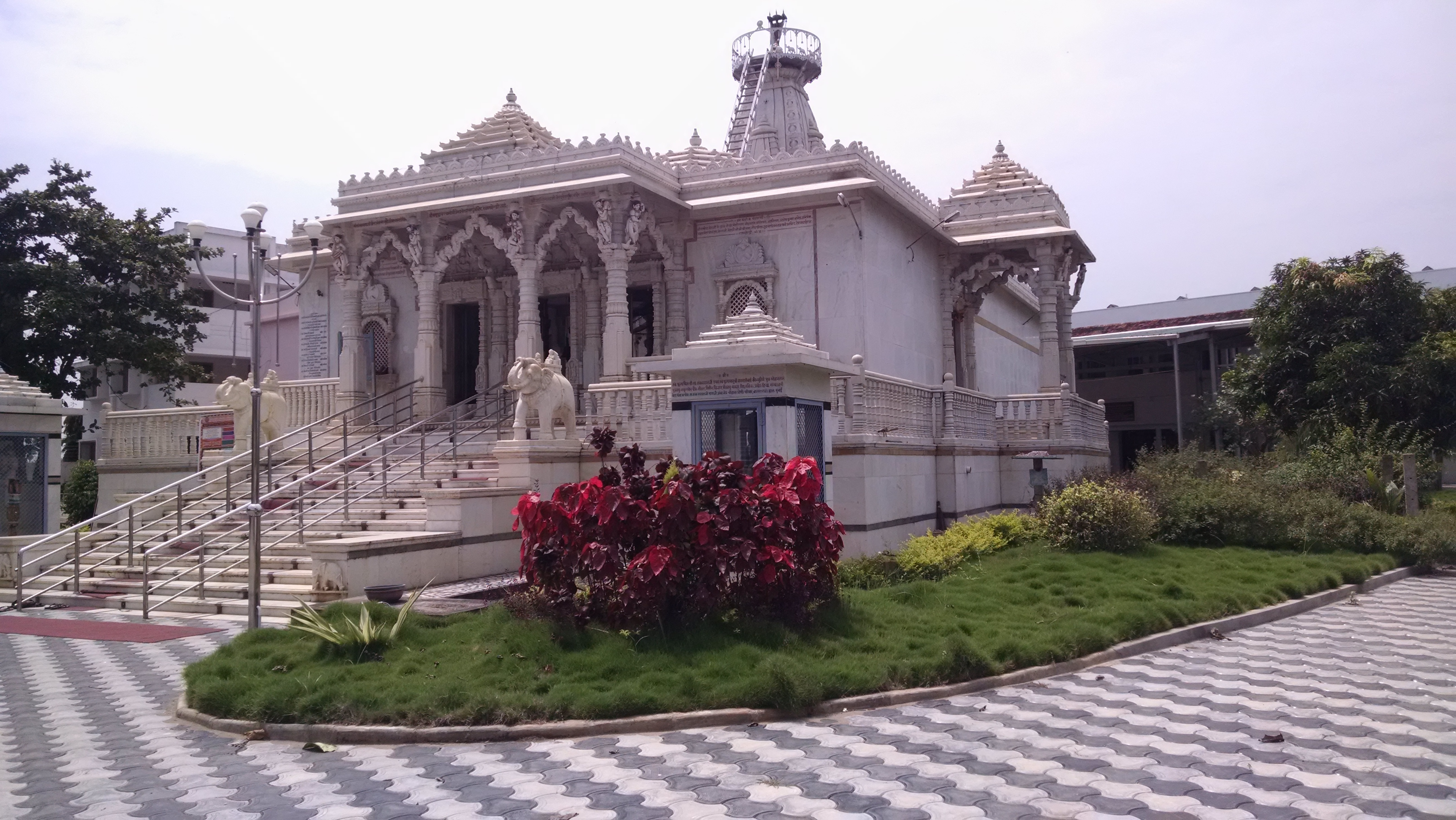
- Jain Temple in Gummileru
- Interactive map of Gummileru
- Location in Andhra Pradesh, India Gummileru (India)
- Coordinates: 17.26726°N 82.26836°E
- Country: India
- State: Andhra Pradesh
- District: Konaseema

Area
  - Total: 1.94 km^{2} (0.75 sq mi)
- Elevation: 16 m (52 ft)

Population (2011)
  - Total: 2,212
  - Density: 1,140/km^{2} (2,950/sq mi)

Languages
  - Official: Telugu
- Time zone: UTC+5:30 (IST)
- PIN: 533232
- Telephone code: +91–8855

Gummileru is a village in Konaseema district of the Indian state of Andhra Pradesh. It is located in Alamuru mandal of Rajahmundry revenue division.
