= Pedagadavilli =

- village
- Interactive map of Pedagadavilli
- Location in Andhra Pradesh, India Pedagadavilli (India)
- Coordinates: 16.5697°N 82.1099°E
- Country: India
- State: Andhra Pradesh
- District: Konaseema district

Area
  - Total: 2 km^{2} (0.77 sq mi)

Population (2011)
  - Total: 1,511
  - Density: 663/km^{2} (1,720/sq mi)

Languages
  - Official: Telugu
- Time zone: UTC+5:30 (IST)
- Postal code: 533 446

Pedagadavilli is a village in Uppalaguptam Mandal, Konaseema district in the state of Andhra Pradesh in India.

== Geography ==
Pedagadavilli is located at 16.5697°N 82.1099°E.

== Demographics ==
As of 2011 India census, Pedagadavilli had a population of 1511, out of which 760 were male and 751 were female. The population of children below 6 years of age was 10%. The literacy rate of the village was 82%.
