= Annampalle =

- village
- Interactive map of Annampalle
- Location in Andhra Pradesh, India Annampalle (India)
- Coordinates: 16.67°N 82.14°E
- Country: India
- State: Andhra Pradesh
- District: Dr. B.R. Ambedkar Konaseema
- Talukas: Mummidivaram

Population (2001)
  - Total: 2,670

Languages
  - Official: Telugu
- Time zone: UTC+5:30 (IST)
- PIN: 533216

Annampalle is a village in Mummidivaram Mandal in Dr. B.R. Ambedkar Konaseema district of Andhra Pradesh, India.
