= Konaseema district protest =

2022 protests in Andhra Pradesh, India

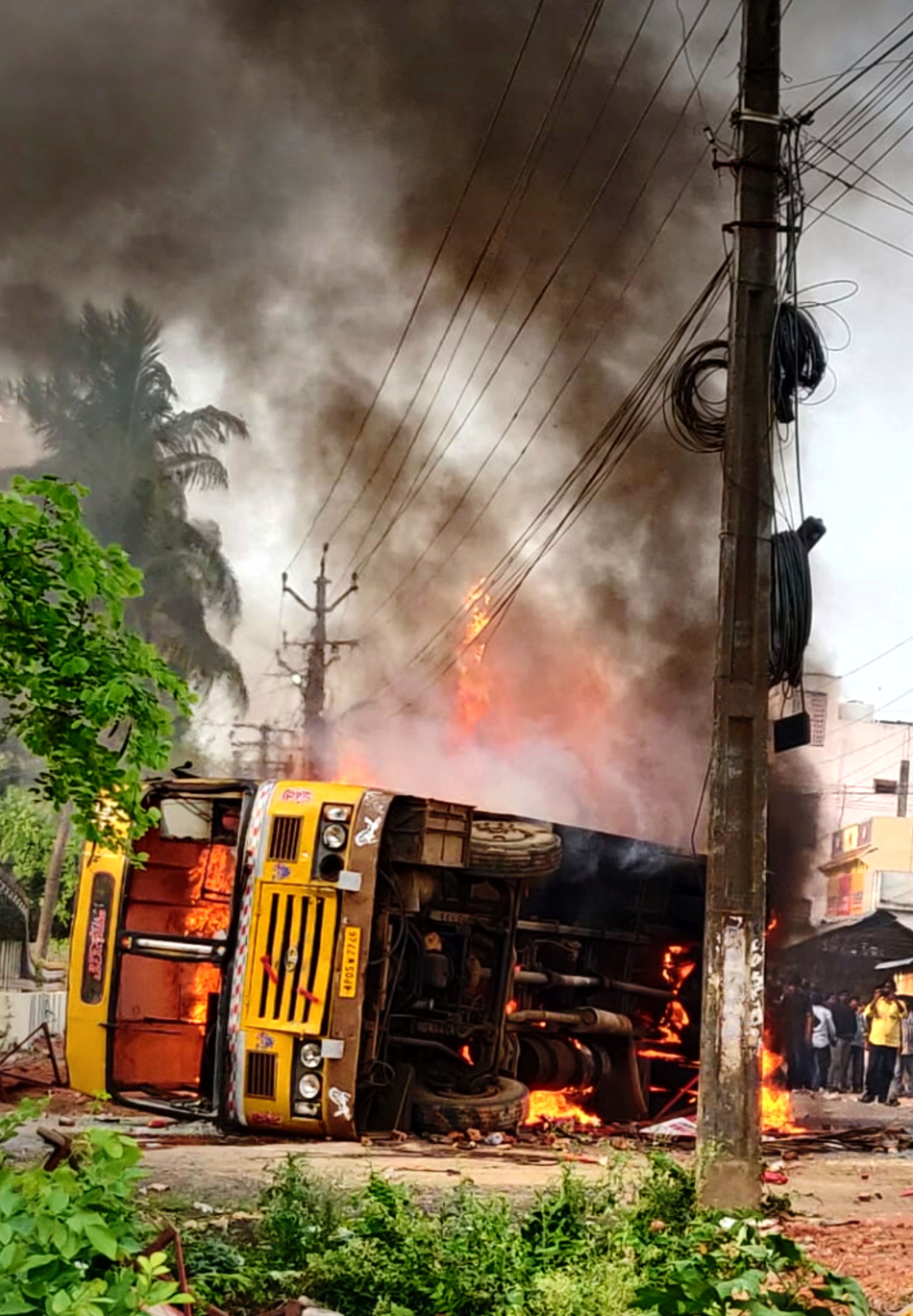
A school bus was set ablaze by demonstrators in protest of the Konaseema district's renaming.

The Konaseema district protest was a protest against the change of name of Konaseema district of Andhra Pradesh to Dr. B.R. Ambedkar Konaseema district. The protest was primarily led by the members of Konaseema Sadhana Samiti, Konaseema Parirakshana Samithi and other organisations.

Opposing the government's decision, on 24 May 2022 several youth gathered and started "Chalo Konaseema" march in Amalapuram. During the march, there was a clash between the police personnel and the protesters.

After this, agitation started in support of the government's decision to name the district after Babasaheb Ambedkar. Ambedkarite Dalits and Leaders of various organisations participated in the ‘Ambedkar Vaadula Atmagaurava Neeli Kavatu’ on BRTS Road here on 15 June 2022, demanded that the government rename Konaseema district as Dr. B.R. Ambedkar district. Even after this, for many days, the supportive movement of Ambedkar's followers started.

On 24 Jun 2022, the government of Andhra Pradesh officially renamed Konaseema district as Dr. B.R. Ambedkar Konaseema district.
