= Gopavaram, Konaseema district =

Gopavaram
- village
- Interactive map of Gopavaram
- Location in Andhra Pradesh, India Gopavaram (India)
- Coordinates: 16.5204°N 82.0567°E
- Country: India
- State: Andhra Pradesh
- District: Dr. B.R. Ambedkar Konaseema

Area
  - Total: 6 km^{2} (2.3 sq mi)

Population (2011)
  - Total: 4,280
  - Density: 742/km^{2} (1,920/sq mi)

Languages
  - Official: Telugu
- Time zone: UTC+5:30 (IST)

Gopavaram is a village in Uppalaguptam Mandal, Dr. B.R. Ambedkar Konaseema district in the state of Andhra Pradesh in India.

== Geography ==
Gopavaram is located at 16.5204°N 82.0567°E.

== Demographics ==
As of 2011 India census, Gopavaram had a population of 4280, out of which 2174 were male and 2106 were female. The population of children below 6 years of age was 10%. The literacy rate of the village was 72%.
