= Ramachandrapuram mandal, Konaseema district =

Ramachandrapuram Mandal
- Mandal
- Interactive Map Outlining mandal
- Country: India
- State: Andhra Pradesh
- District: Dr. B.R. Ambedkar Konaseema
- Time zone: UTC+5:30 (IST)

Ramachandrapuram Mandal is one of the 22 mandals in Dr. B.R. Ambedkar Konaseema district of Andhra Pradesh. As per census 2011, there is 1 town and 20 villages.

== Demographics ==
Ramachandrapuram Mandal has a total population of 114,527 as per the 2011 Census, out of which 57,410 are males while 57,117 are females. The average sex ratio of the mandal is 995. The total literacy rate of Ramachandrapuram Mandal is 77.33%. The male literacy rate is 72.47% and the female literacy rate is 67.08%.

== Towns and villages ==
=== Towns ===
1. Ramachandrapuram, Konaseema

=== Villages ===
1. Adivarapupeta
2. Ambikapalle Agraharam
3. Bapanayyacheruvu
4. Bheemakrosupalem
5. Chodavaram
6. Draksharama
7. Hasanbada
8. Jagannaikulapalem
9. Kandulapalem
10. Kapavaram
11. Malapadu
12. Narasapurapupeta
13. Nelapartipadu
14. Oduru
15. Tadipalle
16. Tallapolam
17. Thotapeta
18. Unduru
19. Utrumilli
20. Vegayammapeta
21. Velampalem
22. Vella
23. Venkatayapalem
24. Yanamadala
25. Yerupalle

== See also ==
- List of mandals in Andhra Pradesh
