= Pasarlapudi =

River delta in Andhra Pradesh, India

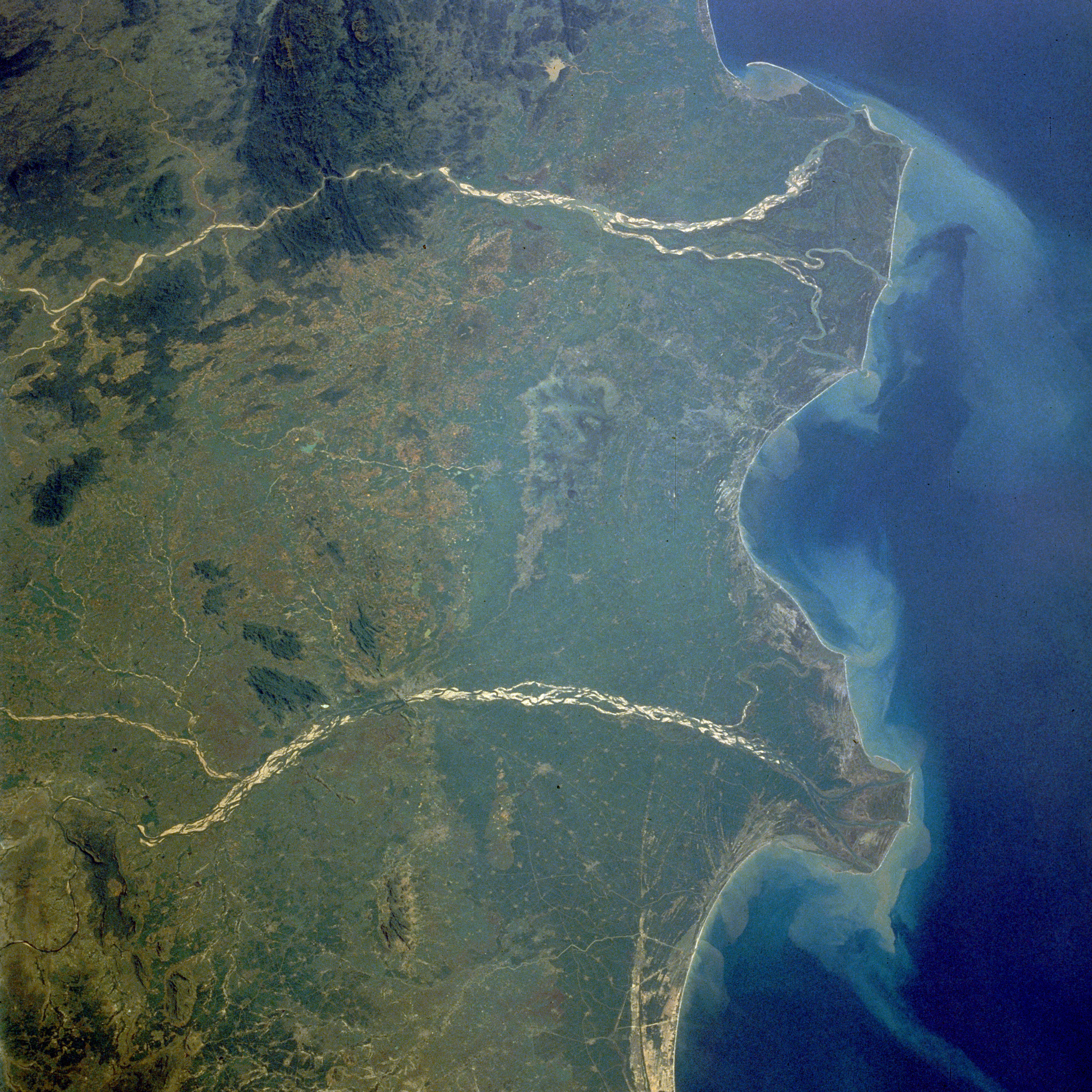
The Godavari River and its Pasarlapudi delta extending into the Bay of Bengal (upper river in image)

Pasarlapudi is the river delta of the Godavari River at the Bay of Bengal in southeastern India. It is located in the Konaseema district of Andhra Pradesh state, in the South India Region.

The Pasarlapudi village is known for its scenic vegetation, and is one of the three important Ferry points for Bodasakurru-Pasarlapudi and the other two being; Kotipalli-Mukteswaram and Sakhinetipalli-Narasapuram in the Konaseema region.

== Resources ==
The west bank of the Godavari River in the delta is one a fertile region in the area, and is also known as Konaseema. It supports Coconut tree and Mango plantations, and rice paddies. Many gas and oil wells are located in Pasarlapudi and its surrounding villages. They use pipelines to a GCS (gas collecting station) at Tatipaka, from there ONGC is supplying gas to the NFCL and other power plants.

== See also ==
- Pasarlapudi blowout
- Coastline of Andhra Pradesh
- Coromandal Coast
- Geography of Andhra Pradesh
