= Appanapalle =

Appanapalle Appanapalli
- Village
- Interactive map of Appanapalle
- Location in Andhra Pradesh, India Appanapalle (India)
- Coordinates: 16.528991°N 81.922212°E
- Country: India
- State: Andhra Pradesh
- District: Dr. B.R. Ambedkar Konaseema

Population (2011)
  - Total: 5,265

Languages
  - Official: Telugu
- Time zone: UTC+5:30 (IST)
- Postal code: 533247
- Vehicle registration: 05
- Nearest city: Palakollu

Appanapalli or Appanapalle is a village in Mamidikuduru Mandal, located in Dr. B.R. Ambedkar Konaseema district of Andhra Pradesh, India.
