= Uppalaguptam mandal =

- Mandal
- Interactive map outlining mandal
- Country: India
- State: Andhra Pradesh
- District: Dr. B.R. Ambedkar Konaseema
- Population according to 2011 Census: 59,931
- Number of Villages: 14
- Area in Sq Km: 117.55
- Time zone: UTC+5:30 (IST)

Uppalaguptam mandal is one of the 22 mandals in Dr. B.R. Ambedkar Konaseema district of Andhra Pradesh. As per census 2011, there are 14 villages in this mandal.

== Demographics ==
Uppalaguptam mandal has total population of 59,931 as per the 2011 Census out of which 30,285 are males while 29,646 are females. The average sex ratio is 979. The total literacy rate is 74%.

== Towns and villages ==
=== Villages ===
1. Bheemanapalle
2. Chinagedavalli
3. Gollavilli
4. Gopavaram
5. Kunavaram
6. Munipalle
7. Nangavaram
8. Nimmakayala Kothapalle
9. Pedagadavilli
10. Sannavalli
11. Surasaniyanam
12. T. Challapalle
13. Uppalaguptam
14. Vilasavilli

== See also ==
- List of mandals in Andhra Pradesh
