= Mamidikuduru mandal =

- Mandal
- Interactive map of Mamidikuduru mandal
- Country: India
- State: Andhra Pradesh
- District: Dr. B.R. Ambedkar Konaseema
- Population according to 2011 Census: 70,369
- Number of Villages: 17
- Area in Sq Km: 79.95
- Time zone: UTC+5:30 (IST)

Mamidikuduru mandal is one of the 22 mandals in Dr. B.R. Ambedkar Konaseema district of Andhra Pradesh. As per census 2011, there are 17 villages in this mandal.

== Demographics ==
Mamidikuduru mandal has total population of 70,369 as per the 2011 Census out of which 35,506 are males while 35,133 are females. The average sex ratio is 989. The total literacy rate is 82%.

== Towns and villages ==
=== Villages ===
1. Adurru
2. Appanapalle
3. Botlaqewe Doddavaram
4. Edarada
5. Geddada
6. Gogannamattam
7. Komarada
8. Lutukurru
9. Magatapalle
10. Makanapalem
11. Mamidikuduru
12. Mogalikuduru
13. Nagaram
14. Pasarlapudi
15. Pasarlapudilanka
16. Pedapatnam

== See also ==
- List of mandals in Andhra Pradesh
