= Dindi, Konaseema district =

- Village
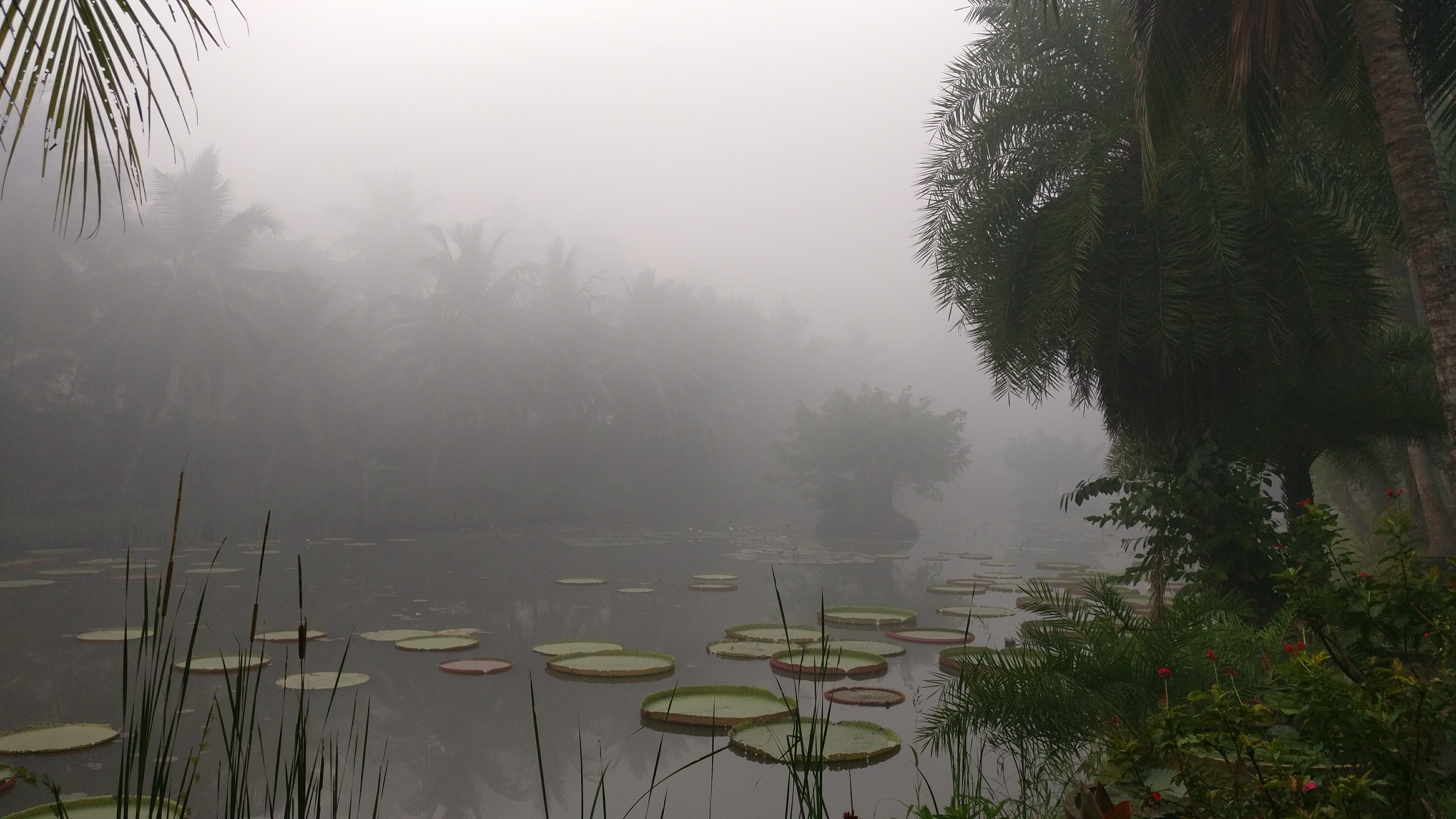
- Godavari view form Dindi Resort
- Interactive map of Dindi, Konaseema district
- Location in Andhra Pradesh, India Dindi, Konaseema district (India)
- Coordinates: 16.4495°N 81.7876°E
- Country: India
- State: Andhra Pradesh
- District: Dr. B.R. Ambedkar Konaseema
- Mandal: Malikipuram mandal

Languages
  - Official: Telugu
- Time zone: UTC+5:30 (IST)

Dindi is a village in Dr. B. R. Ambedkar Konaseema district of the Indian state of Andhra Pradesh. It is located in Malikipuram mandal of Amalapuram revenue division. It is known for coconut plantations and resorts. In 2015 GAIL acquired 400-metre site in to lay a gas pipeline from its refinery at Tatipaka to the Lanco power plant at Kondapalli in Krishna District. Because of various resorts, houseboats, and natural backdrop, it is one of the preferred offbeat destinations for tourists.
