= Mummidivaram mandal =

- Mandal
- Interactive map outlining mandal
- Country: India
- State: Andhra Pradesh
- District: Dr. B.R. Ambedkar Konaseema
- Population according to 2011 Census: 68,586
- Number of Villages: 11
- Area in Sq Km: 95.71
- Time zone: UTC+5:30 (IST)

Mummidivaram mandal is one of the 22 mandals in Dr. B.R. Ambedkar Konaseema district of Andhra Pradesh. As per census 2011, there are 11 villages in this mandal.

== Demographics ==
Mummidivaram mandal has total population of 68,586 as per the 2011 Census out of which 34,389 are males while 34,197 are females. The average sex ratio is 994. The total literacy rate is 78%.

== Towns and villages ==
=== Villages ===
1. Balusulanka
2. Ainapuram
3. Ananthavaram
4. Annampalle
5. Ch. Gunnepalle
6. Gadilanka
7. Kamini
8. Komanapalle
9. Kothalanka
10. Krapa Chintalapudi
11. Mummidivaram
12. Tanelanka
13. Lanka of Thanelanka

== See also ==
- List of mandals in Andhra Pradesh
