= Adurru =

- Village
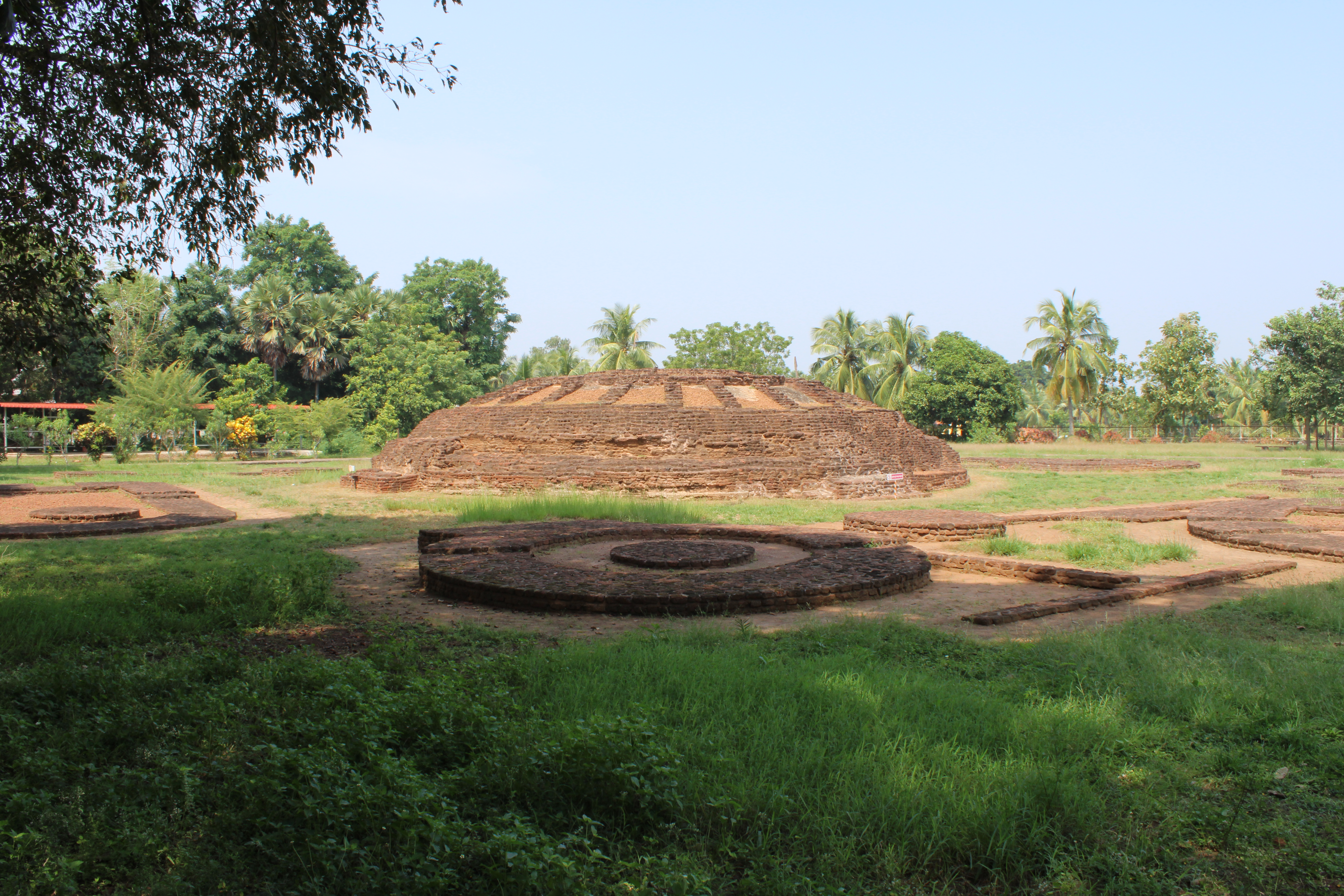
- Ruins of a Buddhist stupa at Adurru
- Interactive map of Adurru
- Location in Andhra Pradesh, India
- Coordinates: 16.478552°N 81.954523°E
- Country: India
- State: Andhra Pradesh
- District: Dr. B.R. Ambedkar Konaseema
- Mandal: Mamidikuduru

Area
  - Total: 5.61 km^{2} (2.17 sq mi)

Population (2011)
  - Total: 4,145
  - Density: 739/km^{2} (1,910/sq mi)

Languages
  - Official: Telugu
- Time zone: UTC+5:30 (IST)
- PIN: 533247

Adurru is a village and a 2nd-century CE Buddhist archaeological site in the Dr. B.R. Ambedkar Konaseema district of Andhra Pradesh, India. It is located in the Mamidikuduru Mandal, on the western bank of Vainateya, a distributary of the Godavari River, around 9.5 km from the Bay of Bengal.

== Buddhist site ==
Adurru is the location of an ancient Buddhist site, which is situated on a mound locally known as Dubaraju Gudi or Dubaraju Dibba. The site was first excavated in 1925, and declared a protected monument by the Archaeological Survey of India (ASI) in 1955. Till 1960, people sacrificed animals at the mound during a two-day annual festival called Dubaraju Teertham, which was held on 13–14 January on the occasion of Sankranti. However, when the ruins were confirmed to be a former Buddhist site, the site was taken over by the ASI, and all sacrifices were banned.

The ruins of a large stupa (maha-stupa), besides other artifacts, have been discovered at the site. A 2015 The Hindu news report, citing the historical evidence found by ASI, claims that the foundation stone for the Adurru Buddhist structure was laid by Sanghamitra, the daughter of the Mauryan emperor Ashoka, on her way to Sri Lanka. In contrast, Garima Kaushik in a 2016 comprehensive list of Buddhist stupa sites in Andhra Pradesh and nearby regions, dates this monastic archaeological site to about 2nd-century CE.

== Demographics ==
According to the 2011 Census of India, Adurru covers an area of 5.61 km^{2}., with a population of 4,145, including 2,096 males and 2,049 females. 1420 people belonging to the Scheduled Castes and 47 people belonging to the Scheduled Tribes. 992 of the villagers are illiterate.
