= Pamarru, Konaseema district =

Pamarru
- Village
- Interactive map of Pamarru
- Location in Andhra Pradesh, India Pamarru (India)
- Coordinates: 16°45′18″N 82°00′24″E
- Country: India
- State: Andhra Pradesh
- District: Konaseema
- Talukas: K.Gangavaram Mandal

Population
  - Total: 66,136

Languages
  - Official: Telugu
- Time zone: UTC+5:30 (IST)
- PIN: 533 305
- Telephone code: +91-08857
- Vehicle Registration: AP05 (Former); AP39 (from 30 January 2019)

Pamarru is a village in Konaseema district in the state of Andhra Pradesh in India.
