= Mamidikuduru =

- village
- Interactive map of Mamidikuduru
- Coordinates: 16°30′11″N 81°55′08″E
- Country: India
- State: Andhra Pradesh
- District: Dr. B.R. Ambedkar Konaseema
- Talukas: Mamidikuduru (Old Razole Taluk)

Languages
  - Official: Telugu
- Time zone: UTC+5:30 (IST)
- PIN: 533247
- Telephone code: 08862- 238xxx, 08862-239xxx
- Vehicle Registration: AP05 (Former); AP39 (from 30 January 2019)

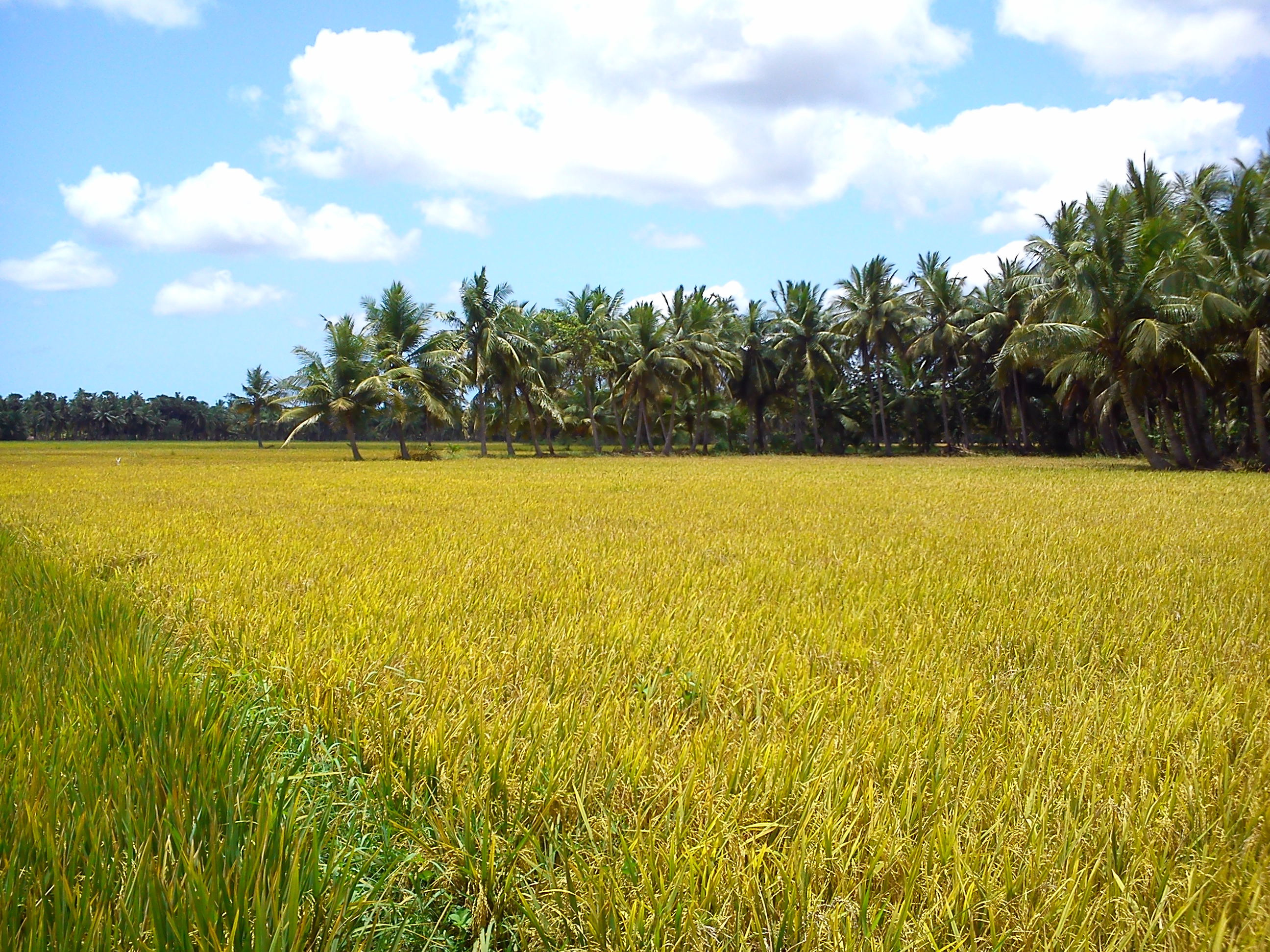
Paddy Fields in Mamidikuduru

Mamidi-kud-uru is a village in Mamidikuduru Mandal, Dr. B.R. Ambedkar Konaseema district, Andhra Pradesh, India.
