= K. Gangavaram mandal =

Pamarru Mandal
- Mandal
- Interactive map of Pamarru Mandal
- Country: India
- State: Andhra Pradesh
- District: Konaseema
- Time zone: UTC+5:30 (IST)

K.Gangavaram Mandal is one of the mandals in Konaseema district of Andhra Pradesh. It was called as Pamarru mandal and later renamed. As per census 2011, there are 24 villages.

== Demographics ==
This mandal has total population of 63,013 as per the Census 2011 out of which 31,835 are males while 31,178 are females and the average Sex Ratio is 979. The total literacy rate is 69.15%. The male literacy rate is 65.74% and the female literacy rate is 58.81%.

== Towns & Villages ==
=== Villages ===
1. Addampalle
2. Amjuru
3. Balantharam
4. Bhatla Palika
5. Dangeru
6. Gangavaram
7. Gudigalla Bhaga
8. Gudigalla Rallagunta
9. Koolla
10. Kota
11. Kotipalle
12. Kudupuru
13. Kunduru
14. Masakapalle
15. Pamarru
16. Paningapalle
17. Pekeru
18. Satyawada
19. Sivala
20. Sundarapalle
21. Thamarapalle
22. Vilasa Gangavaram
23. Yendagandi
24. Yerraa Pothavaram
25. Vakatippa (Uninhabited)
26. Nagulacheruvu (Uninhabited)

== See also ==
- List of mandals in Andhra Pradesh
