= Alamuru mandal =

Alamuru Mandal
- Mandal
- Interactive map of Alamuru Mandal
- Country: India
- State: Andhra Pradesh
- District: Dr. B.R. Ambedkar Konaseema
- Time zone: UTC+5:30 (IST)

Alamuru Mandal is one of the 22 mandals in Dr. B.R. Ambedkar Konaseema district of Andhra Pradesh. As per census 2011, there are 16 villages.

== Demographics ==
Alamuru Mandal has total population of 74,025 as per the Census 2011 out of which 36,955 are males while 37,070 are females and the Average Sex Ratio of Alamuru Mandal is 1,003. The total literacy rate of Alamuru Mandal is 65.77%. The male literacy rate is 60.29% and the female literacy rate is 57.89%.

== Towns and villages ==
=== Villages ===
1. Alamuru
2. Baduguvanilanka
3. Chintaluru
4. Choppela
5. Gummileru
6. Jonnada
7. Kalavacherla
8. Madiki
9. Modukuru
10. Narsipudi
11. Navabpeta
12. Pedapalle
13. Penikeru
14. Pinapalla
15. Sandhipudi
16. Mulastanam

== See also ==
- List of mandals in Andhra Pradesh
