= Ambajipeta mandal =

Ambajipeta
- Interactive map of Ambajipeta
- Location in Andhra Pradesh, India
- Coordinates: 16°35′38.1″N 81°56′43.1″E
- Country: India
- State: Andhra Pradesh
- District: Konaseema district

Government
  - Type: Panchayat
  - Body: Sarpanch

Area
  - Total: 53.90 km^{2} (20.81 sq mi)

Population (2011)
  - Total: 63,134
  - Density: 1,171/km^{2} (3,034/sq mi)

Languages
  - Official: Telugu
- Time zone: UTC+5:30 (IST)
- PIN: 533214
- Telephone code: 08856
- Vehicle Registration: AP05 (Former); AP39 (from 30 January 2019)

Ambajipeta mandal is one of the 22 mandals in Konaseema district of the Indian state of Andhra Pradesh.

== Villages ==
Ambajipet mandal consists of 14 villages. The following are the list of villages in the mandal:

1. Chiratapudi
2. Gangalakurru
3. Gangalakurru Agaragaram
4. Irusumanda
5. Isukapudi
6. K.Pedapudi
7. Machavaram
8. Mosalipalle
9. Mukkamala
10. Nandampudi
11. Pasuppalle
12. Pullettikurru
13. Thondavaram
14. Vakkalanka
