= Alamuru =

- village
- Interactive map of Alamuru
- Location in Andhra Pradesh, India Alamuru (India)
- Coordinates: 16.7833°N 81.9000°E
- Country: India
- State: Andhra Pradesh
- District: Dr. B.R. Ambedkar Konaseema district
- Tanuku: Alamuru
- Elevation: 1 m (3.3 ft)

Population
  - Total: 45,000

Languages
  - Official: Telugu
- Time zone: UTC+5:30 (IST)
- PIN: 533233
- Telephone code: 08855
- Vehicle Registration: AP05 (Former); AP39 (from 30 January 2019)

Alamuru is a village in Dr. B.R. Ambedkar Konaseema district in the state of Andhra Pradesh in India.

== Geography ==
Alamuru is located at 16.7833°N 81.9000°E. It has an average elevation of 1 meter (6 feet).
