= Ramachandrapuram, Konaseema district =

Ramachandrapuram
- Town
- Location in Andhra Pradesh, India
- Coordinates: 16.85°N 82.02°E
- Country: India
- State: Andhra Pradesh
- District: Dr. B.R. Ambedkar Konaseema

Government
  - MLA: Vasamsetti Subash

Area
  - Total: 13.98 km^{2} (5.40 sq mi)

Population (2011)
  - Total: 43,657
  - Density: 3,123/km^{2} (8,088/sq mi)

Languages
  - Official: Telugu
- Time zone: UTC+5:30 (IST)
- Postal code: 533255
- Vehicle Registration: AP05 (Former); AP39 (from 30 January 2019)

Ramachandrapuram is a town located in Konaseema district of the Indian state of Andhra Pradesh. The town is a Municipality which serves as the headquarters of Ramachandrapuram mandal and Ramachandrapuram revenue division and acts as a central hub to nearest cities. This is one of the seven assembly segments of Amalapuram Lok Sabha constituency. The town's name is linked to Kakarlapudi Ramachandraraju, and it was initially referred to as Ramachandrapuram, later clarified as Kota Ramachandrapuram (Fort Town) to distinguish it from other villages with similar names. The town's origin is tied to the Kakarlapudi family who built a fort after their previous fort in Kotipalli was inundated by floods. Ramachandrapuram became a municipality in 1959, initially as a Grade III municipality, and later upgraded to 2nd grade in 1980. The fort, built in 1865, is a prominent landmark and attracts film shoots. The Kakarlapudi family has played a role in the town's administration, with members serving as Municipal Chairmen and legislators.

== Geography ==
Ramachandrapuram is located at 16.837919°N 82.025907°E. It has an average elevation of 10 metres (32 feet).

== Demographics ==
As of 2011 Census of India, the town had a population of 43,657. The total population constitute, 21,544 males, 22,113 females and 3,994 children, in the age group of 0–6 years. The average literacy rate stands at 82.25% with 32,623 literates, significantly higher than the national average of 73.00%.

== Transport ==
The Andhra Pradesh State Road Transport Corporation operates bus services from Ramachandrapuram bus station. Ramachandrapuram (E) town is central hub to the nearest cities i.e to the direction of North(N) 30km away to Kakinada, South(S) 6km away to Draksharama (Dakshana kasi), 25km away to Yanam and West(W) 32km away to Ravulapalem, 38km away to Rajahmundry. Proposed Kakinada to Narsapuram (west godavari) railway line project interlinks Ramachandrapuram Railway line lies in-between Kakinada - Kotipalli and Rajahmundry Airport is 45km away from town.

== Education ==
The primary and secondary school education is imparted by government, aided and private schools, under the School Education Department of the state. The medium of instruction followed by different schools are English, Telugu.
