= Konaseema district =

District in Andhra Pradesh, India

- District of Andhra Pradesh
- Dr. B. R. Ambedkar Konaseema district
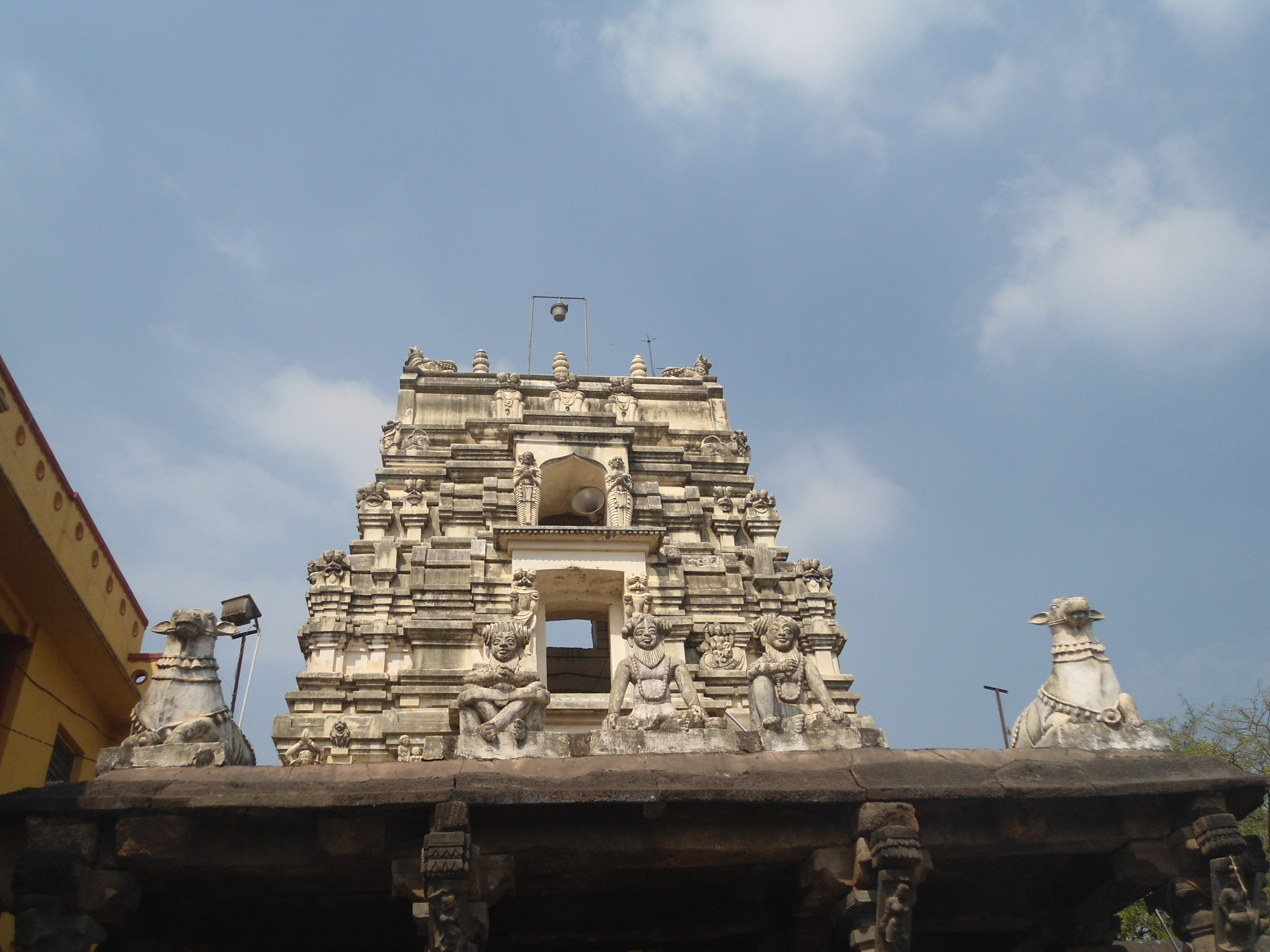
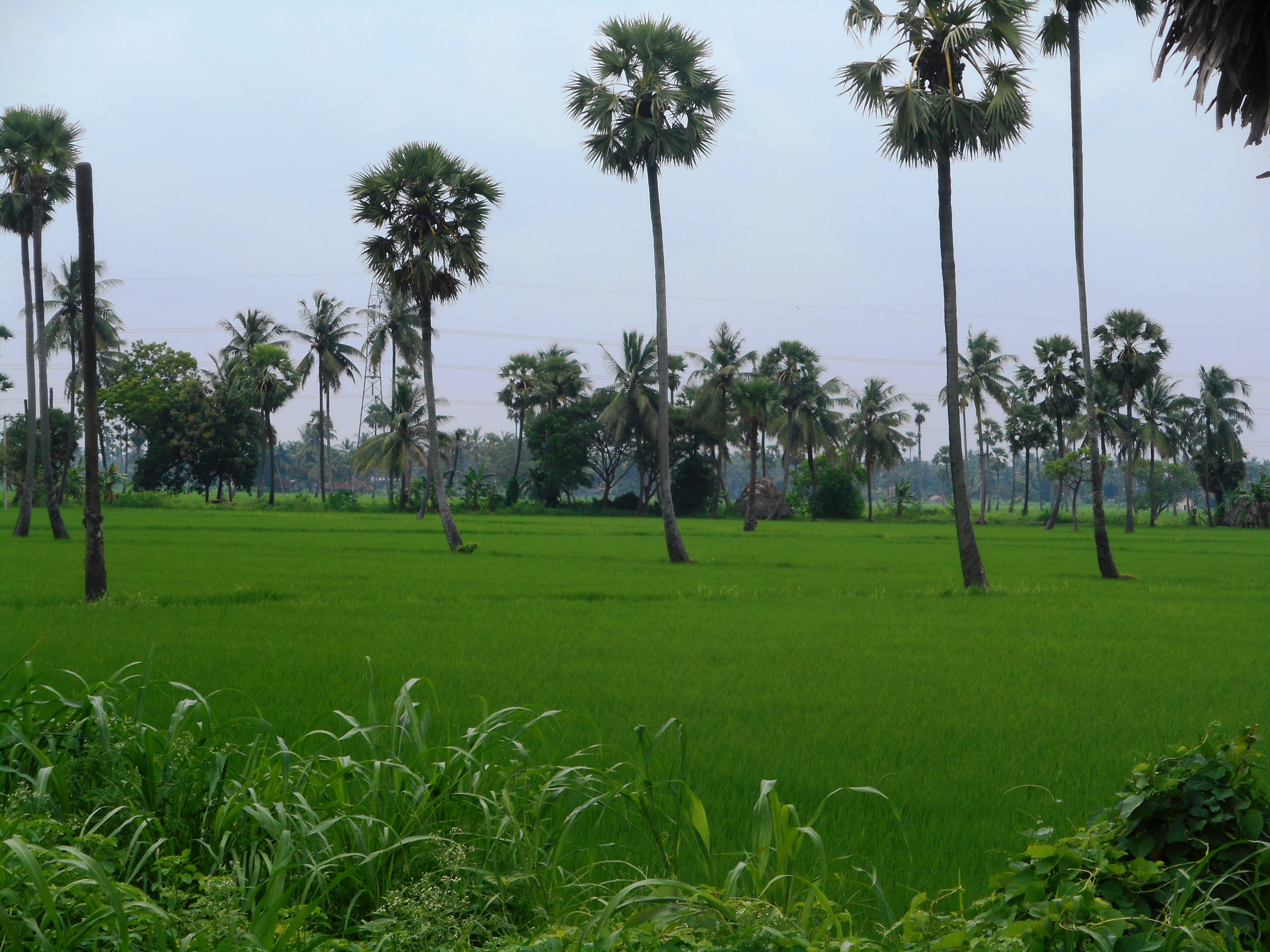
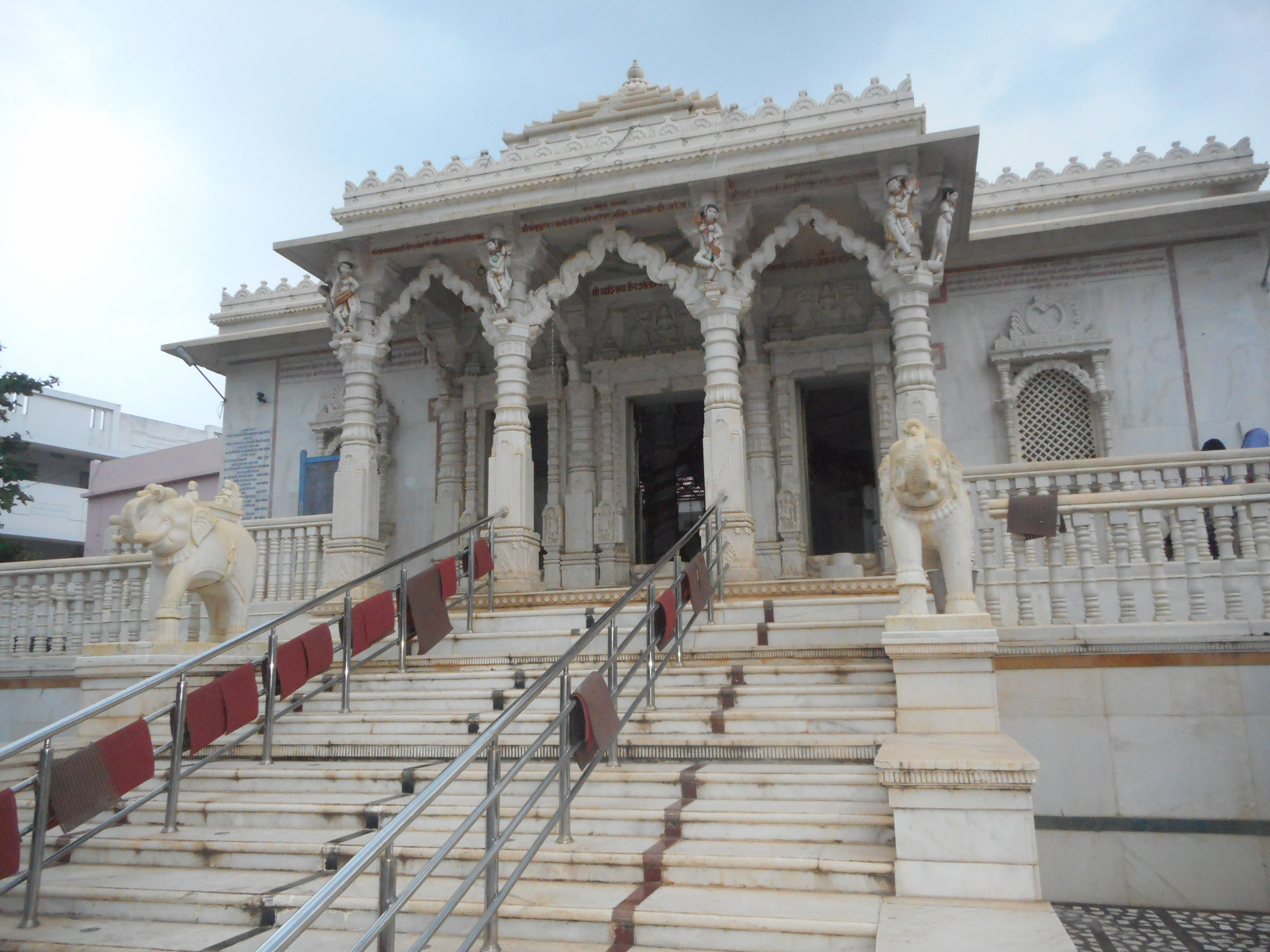
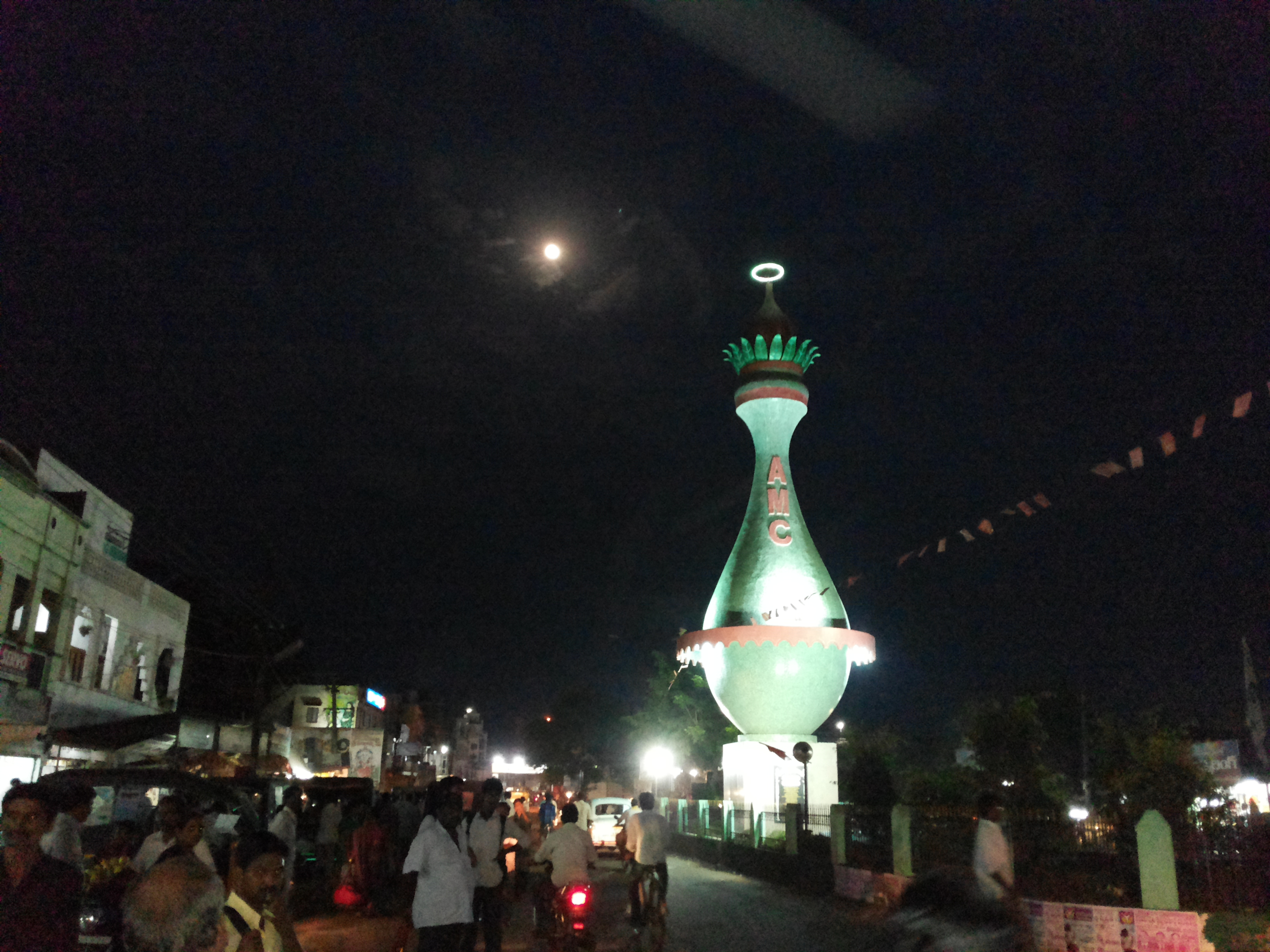
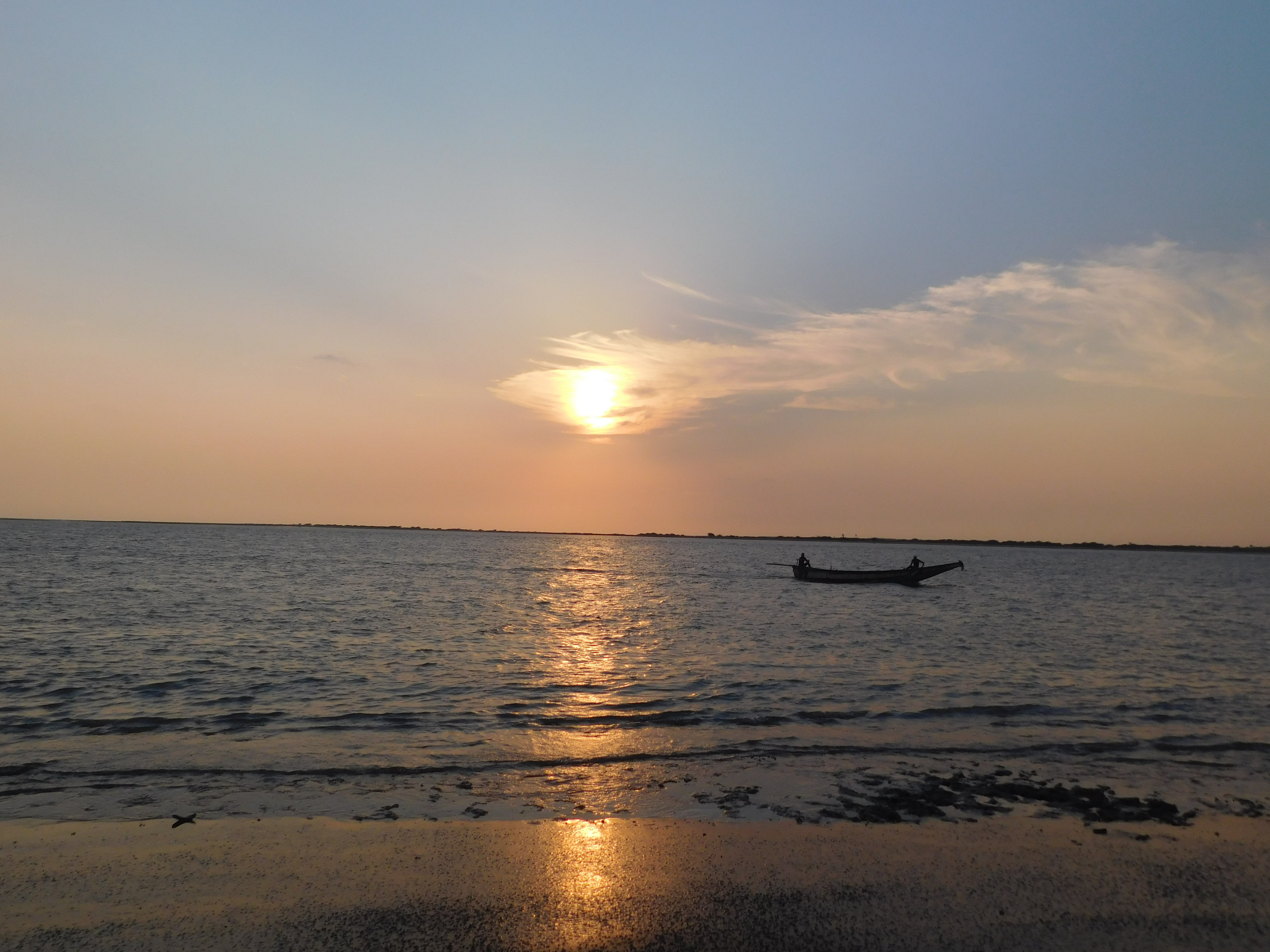
- Clockwise from top-left: Bhimeswara temple at Draksharama, Crop fields in Yeditha, Street of Amalapuram, Antarvedi Beach, Gummileru Jain Temple
- Interactive map of Konaseema district
- Coordinates: 16.6°N 82.0°E
- Country: India
- State: Andhra Pradesh
- Region: Kosta Andhra
- Formed: 4 April 2022
- Founder: Government of Andhra Pradesh
- Headquarters: Amalapuram

Government
  - District collector: Mahesh Kumar IAS
  - Superintendent of Police: P Sridhar IPS
  - Lok Sabha constituencies: 01
  - Assembly constituencies: 07

Area
  - Total: 2,081.2 km^{2} (803.6 sq mi)

Population (2011)
  - Total: 1,719,093
  - Density: 826.01/km^{2} (2,139.4/sq mi)

Languages
  - Official: Telugu
- Time zone: UTC+05:30 (IST)
- District LGD code: 747
- District abbreviation: KNS
- Website: konaseema.ap.gov.in

Konaseema district (officially Dr. B. R. Ambedkar Konaseema district) is a district in Konaseema region of Andhra Pradesh in India. It is situated between the tributaries of the Godavari River in the Kosta Andhra region. It was carved out of East Godavari district on 4 April 2022 by the Government of Andhra Pradesh. Amalapuram is the district headquarters and the largest city in this district. The district shares boundaries with West Godavari, East Godavari and Kakinada districts.

== Geography ==
Dr. B. R. Ambedkar Konaseema district is situated in the delta of the Godavari River. This district also known as the Andhra kerala. The land in this region is considered highly fertile, and its economy is primarily based on agriculture, especially with a focus on rice and coconut cultivation. Mangrove forests are present in the northeast of the district. Apart from the Ramachandrapuram revenue division, the district lies between the two branches of the Godavari River. The Godavari divides into two components, namely Gautami and Vasishtha, forming an island which is called Konaseema.

This district is surrounded to the north by East Godavari district, south by the Bay of Bengal, east by Kakinada district and west by West Godavari district.

== History ==
On 26 January 2022 the Andhra Pradesh Cabinet made a significant decision to create 13 new districts, and among them, the proposal for the Konaseema district was approved. On 4 April 2022 the chief minister Y. S. Jagan Mohan Reddy virtually inaugurated all 13 new districts, officially establishing Konaseema district. However, on 18 May 2022, the government initiated discussions about renaming Konaseema district in honour of B. R. Ambedkar, leading to violent protests on 24 May 2022, during which protesters set ablaze the home of transport minister Pinipe Viswarup. Subsequently, on 24 June 2022, the Andhra Pradesh Cabinet endorsed the gazette notification issued on May 18, officially approving the renaming of the district. Finally, on 2 August 2022, Konaseema district was officially renamed to Dr. B. R. Ambedkar Konaseema district. The change took effect on that date, as announced in the gazette notification by the Governor of Andhra Pradesh.

The notification stated:

the Governor of Andhra Pradesh, in the interests of public, after having published proposals in that regard as required under sub-section (5) of Section 3 of the Andhra Pradesh Districts (formation) Act, 1974 (Act No.7 of 1974), and having taken into consideration the objections and suggestions received thereon all persons in the areas concerned and likely to be affected thereby, do hereby notify to change the existing name of the Konaseema district as Dr. B. R. Ambedkar Konaseema district

== Politics ==
There is one parliamentary and six assembly constituencies in the Dr. B. R. Ambedkar Konaseema district. The parliamentary constituency is Amalapuram (Lok Sabha constituency), and the assembly constituencies are listed below.

Constituency number	Name	Reserved for (SC/ST/None)	Parliament
42	Ramachandrapuram	None	Amalapuram
43	Mummidivaram	None	Amalapuram
44	Amalapuram	SC	Amalapuram
45	Razole	SC	Amalapuram
46	Gannavaram	SC	Amalapuram
47	Kothapeta	None	Amalapuram

== Administrative divisions ==
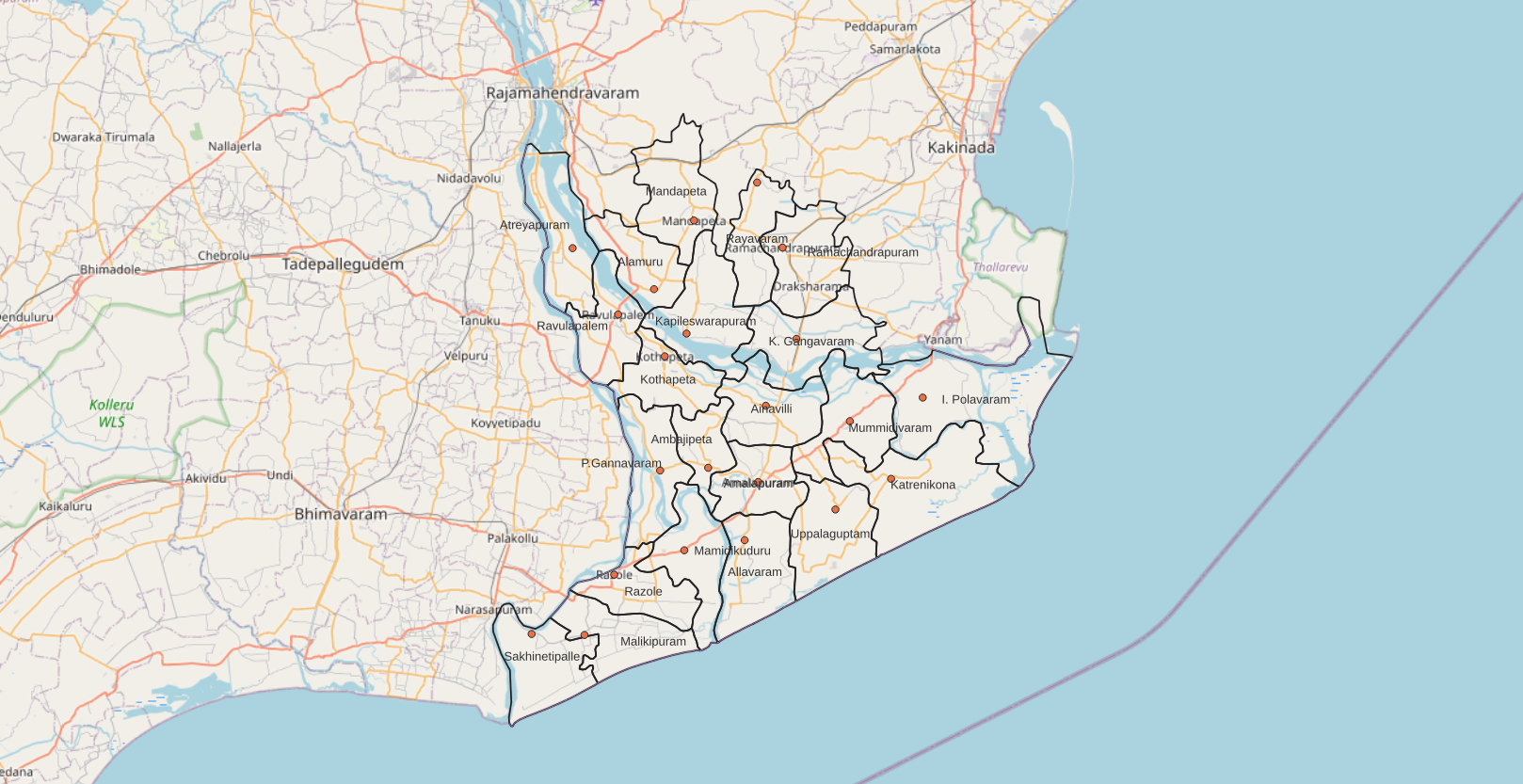
Satellite view of Dr B. R. Ambedkar Konaseema district

The district is divided into 3 revenue divisions: Amalapuram, Kothapeta and Ramachandrapuram, each of which is further subdivided into a total of 19 mandals, with each mandal being headed by a sub-collector.

=== Mandals ===
The list of 19 mandals in Dr. B. R. Ambedkar Konaseema district, divided into 3 revenue divisions, is given below.

1. Amalapuram revenue division
  1. Allavaram
  2. Amalapuram
  3. I. Polavaram
  4. Katrenikona
  5. Malikipuram
  6. Mamidikuduru
  7. Mummidivaram
  8. Razole
  9. Sakhinetipalle
  10. Uppalaguptam
2. Kothapeta revenue division
  1. Ainavilli
  2. Alumuru
  3. Ambajipeta
  4. Atreyapuram
  5. Kothapeta
  6. P. Gannavaram
  7. Ravulapalem
3. Ramachandrapuram revenue division
  1. K. Gangavaram
  2. Ramachandrapuram

== Cities and towns ==
The district underwent reorganization in 2022, resulting in the presence of one Grade 1 municipality, two Grade 2 municipalities, and one Nagar Panchayat.

Largest towns and villages in Dr. B. R. Ambedkar Konaseema district
Rank	Name	Revenue division	Civil Status	Population
1	Amalapuram	Amalapuram	Municipality Grade - 1	53,231
2	Ramachandrapuram	Ramachandrapuram	Municipality Grade - 2	43,657
3	Mummidivaram	Amalapuram	Nagar Panchayat	25,355
4	Kothapeta	Kothapeta	Gram Panchayat	24,539
5	Razole	Amalapuram	Gram Panchayat	13,597
6	Bandarulanka	Amalapuram	Gram Panchayat	11,470
7	Alamuru	Kothapeta	Gram Panchayat	9,723
8	P. Gannavaram	Kothapeta	Gram Panchayat	9,459

== Demographics ==
Religions in Konaseema district (2011)
Religion	Percent
Hinduism	97.50%
Christianity	1.34%
Islam	1.00%
Other or not stated	0.16%
Distribution of religions

At the time of the 2011 census, Dr. B. R. Ambedkar Konaseema district had a population of 1453149, of which 108358 (7.46%) lived in urban areas. Konaseema district had a sex ratio of 991 females per 1000 males. Scheduled Castes and Scheduled Tribes comprised 385,271 (26.51%) and 11,506 (0.79%).

Telugu is the predominant language, spoken by 99.11% of the population.

== Culture ==
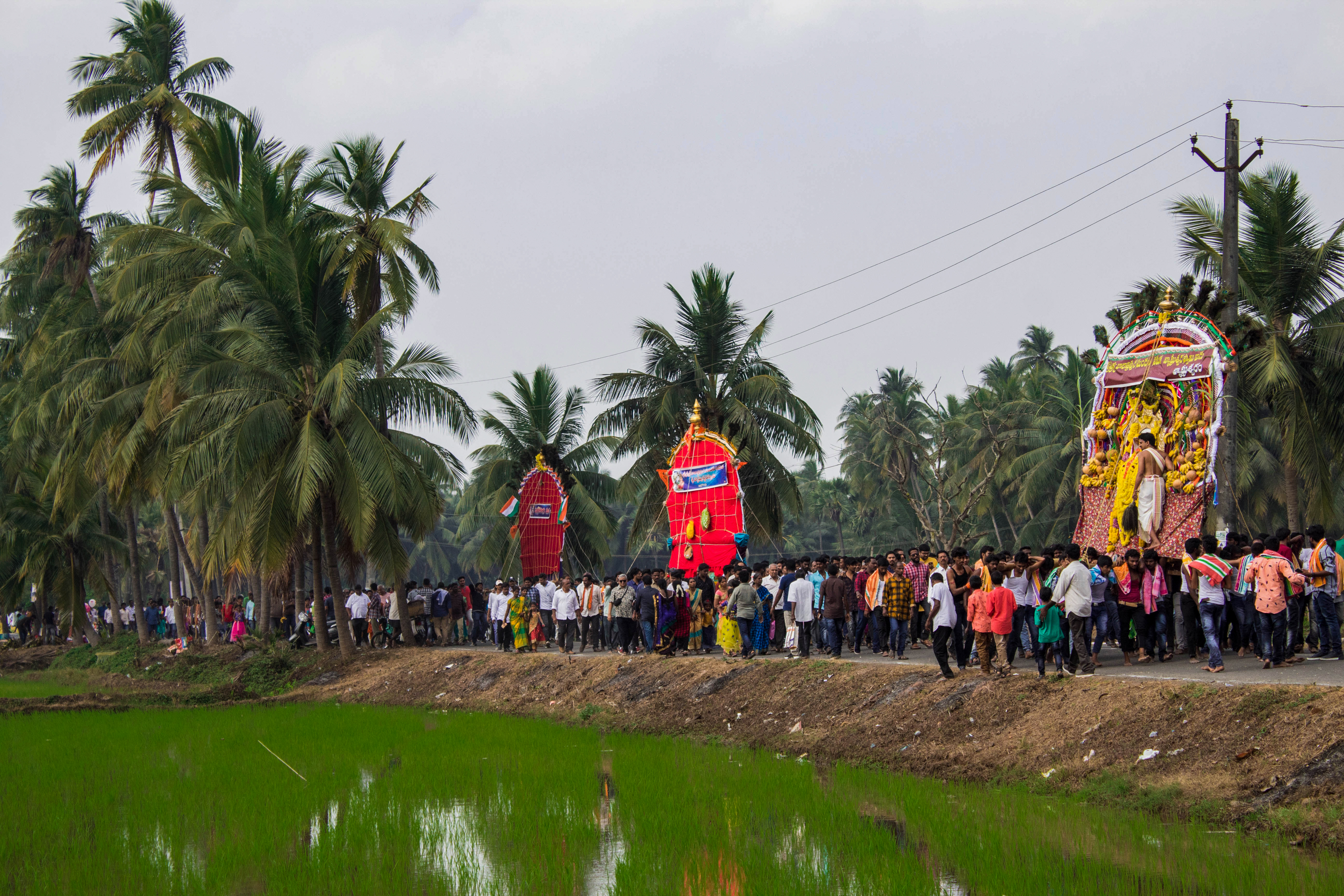
Prabhala Teerdham festival in Konaseema

The region has a diverse folk culture with their regional gods. In the heart of the Godavari Delta, Konaseema is one of the only two regions in India, apart from Kerala, where a Brahmin community still practices traditional Shrauta rituals. These traditions have largely fallen out of use in the rest of India, making it a favoured destination for scholars seeking to understand ancient Vedic culture. Most of the Dalits, like in most of Coastal Andhra, are Christians - both Catholic and Protestant.

Sankranti is observed as the major festival in the Konaseema region. The people of Konaseema commemorate the 400-year-old tradition of 'Prabhala Teertham' on Kanuma, the third day of the Sankranti festival. This unique celebration was featured as a tableau in the Republic Day parade in New Delhi on 26 January 2023.

== Tourism ==
Dr. B. R. Ambedkar Konaseema district boasts numerous tourist attractions, including the picturesque Antarvedi, Chirra Yanam, and Odalarevu beaches. A notable 2nd-century CE Buddhist archaeological site can be found in Adurru village. Additionally, the Andhra Pradesh Tourism Development Corporation operates resorts in Dindi, providing tourists with the opportunity to indulge in the scenic beauty of the Konaseema backwaters.

Among the district's religious landmarks, Sri Vighneswara Swamy Devasthanam in Ainavilli, Lord Venkateshwara Temple in Appanapalli, Lakshmi Narasimha Temple in Antarvedi, and Bhimeswara Swamy Temple in Draksharamam are renowned for their cultural and historical significance.

Tourist attractions in Dr. B. R. Ambedkar Konaseema district
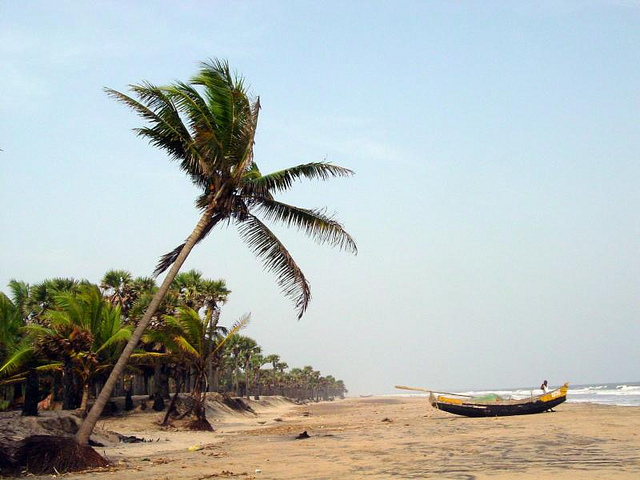
Antarvedi beach, Antarvedi

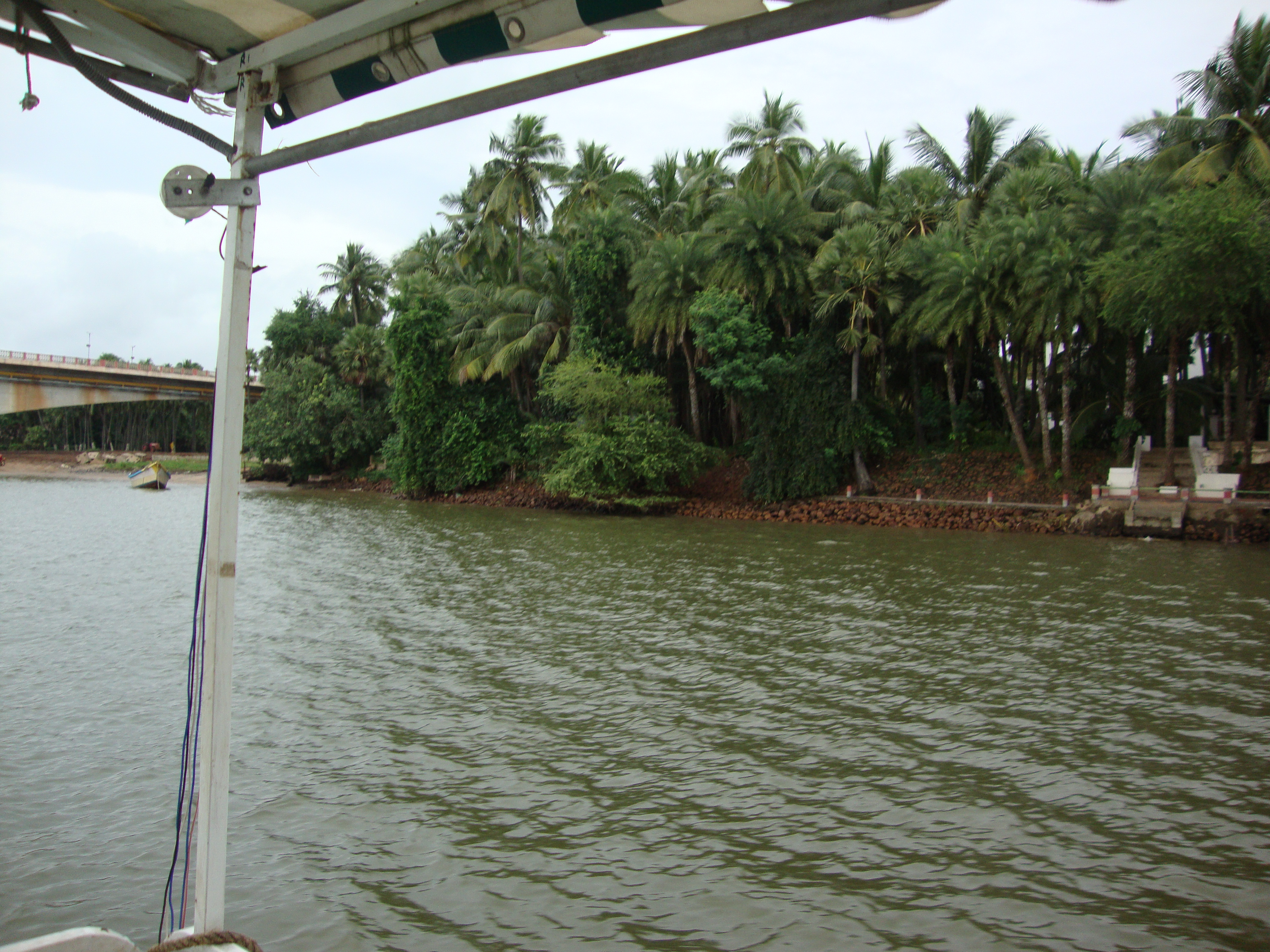
Godavari River backwaters near Dindi

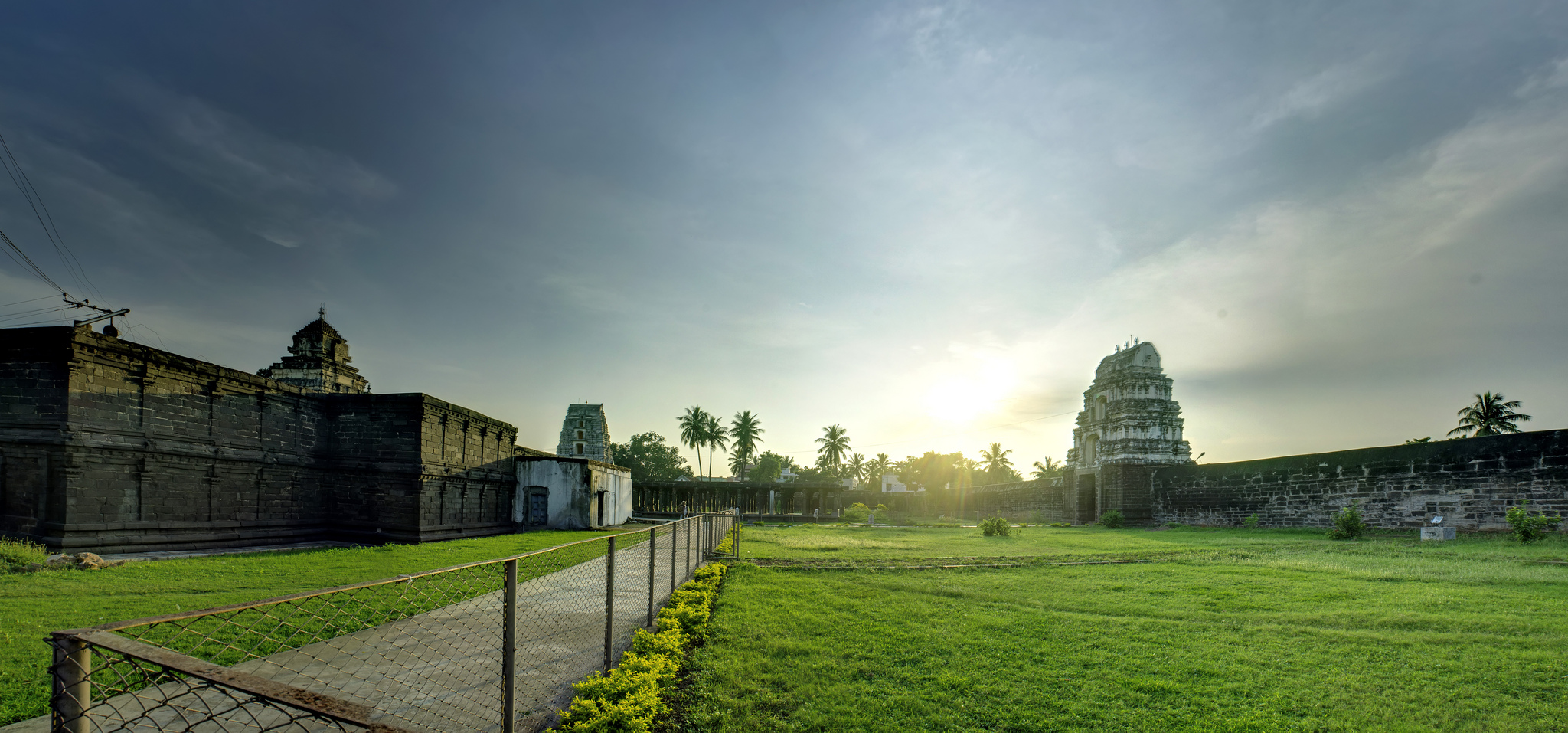
Bhimeswara Swamy temple in Draksharamam

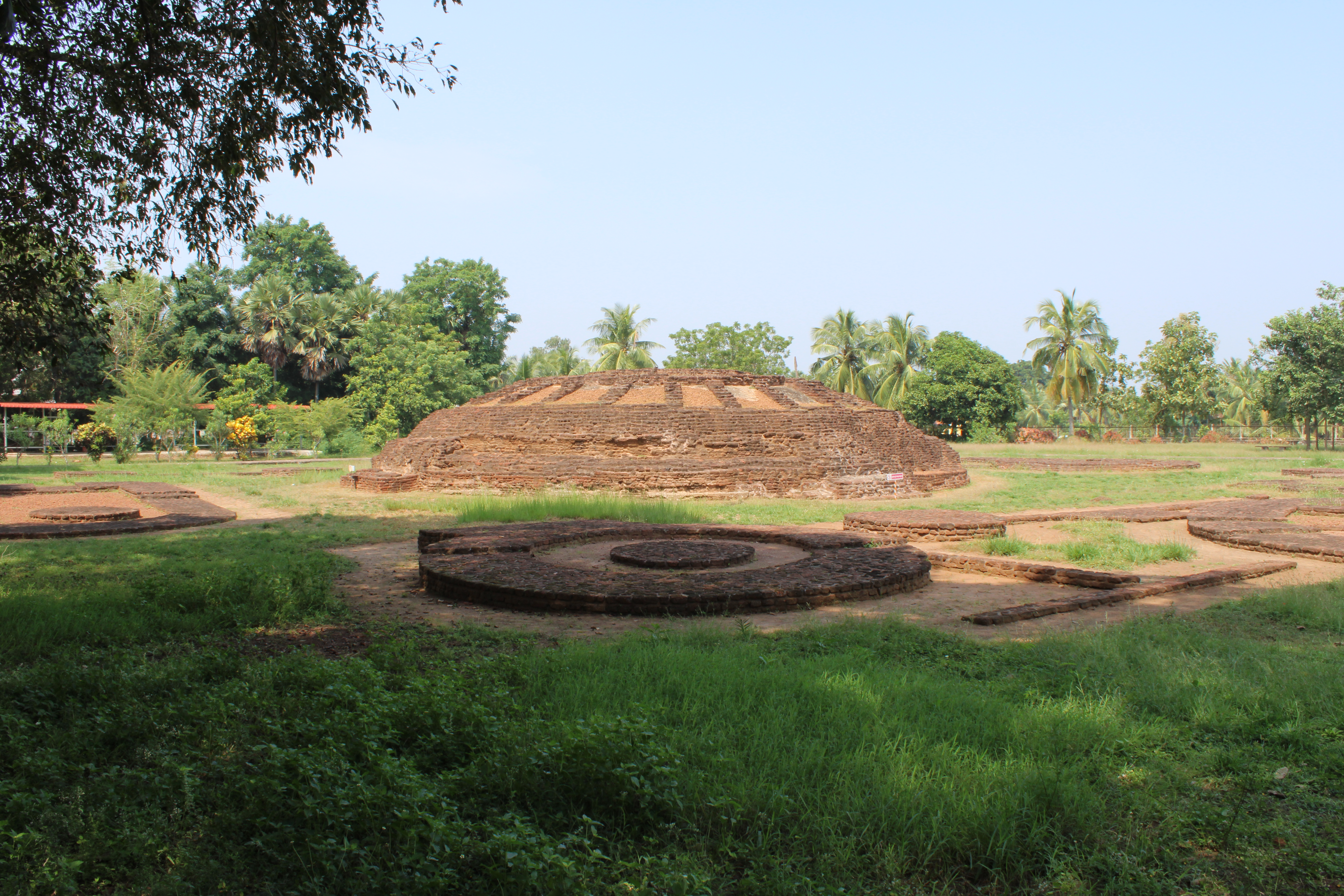
Buddhist Stupa in Adurru

== Transportation ==
=== Road ===
Dr. B. R. Ambedkar Konaseema district has efficient connectivity through state and national highways, namely NH216, NH216A, and NH216E, which diverge from NH16 and pass through the region. Furthermore, APSRTC has bus depots in Amalapuram, Ravulapalem, and Ramachandrapuram, operating bus services to villages within the district and connecting to various towns and cities in Andhra Pradesh and Telangana.

=== Railway ===
The district is currently served by four railway stations. Dwarapudi railway station and Kesavaram railway station on the Howrah-Chennai main line, and Kotipalli railway station and Ramachandrapuram railway station on the Kakinada - Kotipalli line. Additionally, the Kakinada - Kotipalli - Narsapur railway line is currently under construction, including the development of a bridge over the Godavari river. Upon completion, this railway line will include a stop at the district headquarters, Amalapuram railway station, enhancing connectivity in the region. Among the major railway stations in proximity to the district are Rajahmundry railway station and Narasapur railway station.

=== Air ===
The district lacks airport, with the closest domestic airport being Rajahmundry Airport at a distance of 75.5 kilometres (46.9 mi) from the district headquarters, Amalapuram. For international travel, the nearest airports are Vijayawada Airport 170 kilometres (110 mi) and Alluri Sitarama Raju International Airport, situated 219 kilometres (136 mi).

== See also ==
- Konaseema district protest
