= Konaseema =

Island group in the Bay of Bengal

- Location within Andhra Pradesh
- Coordinates: 16.582°N 82.155°E

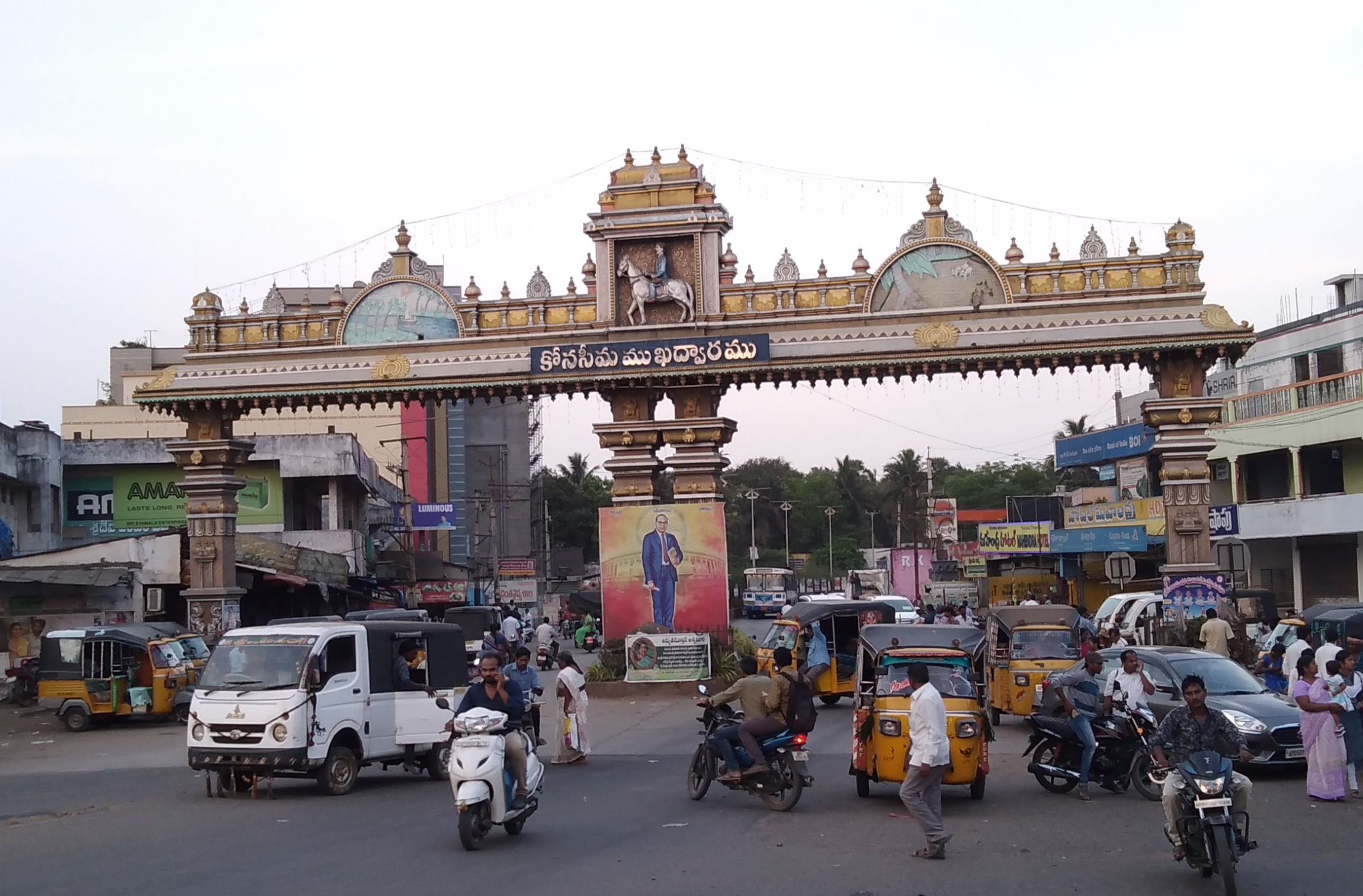
Arched entrance of Konaseema at Ravulapalem

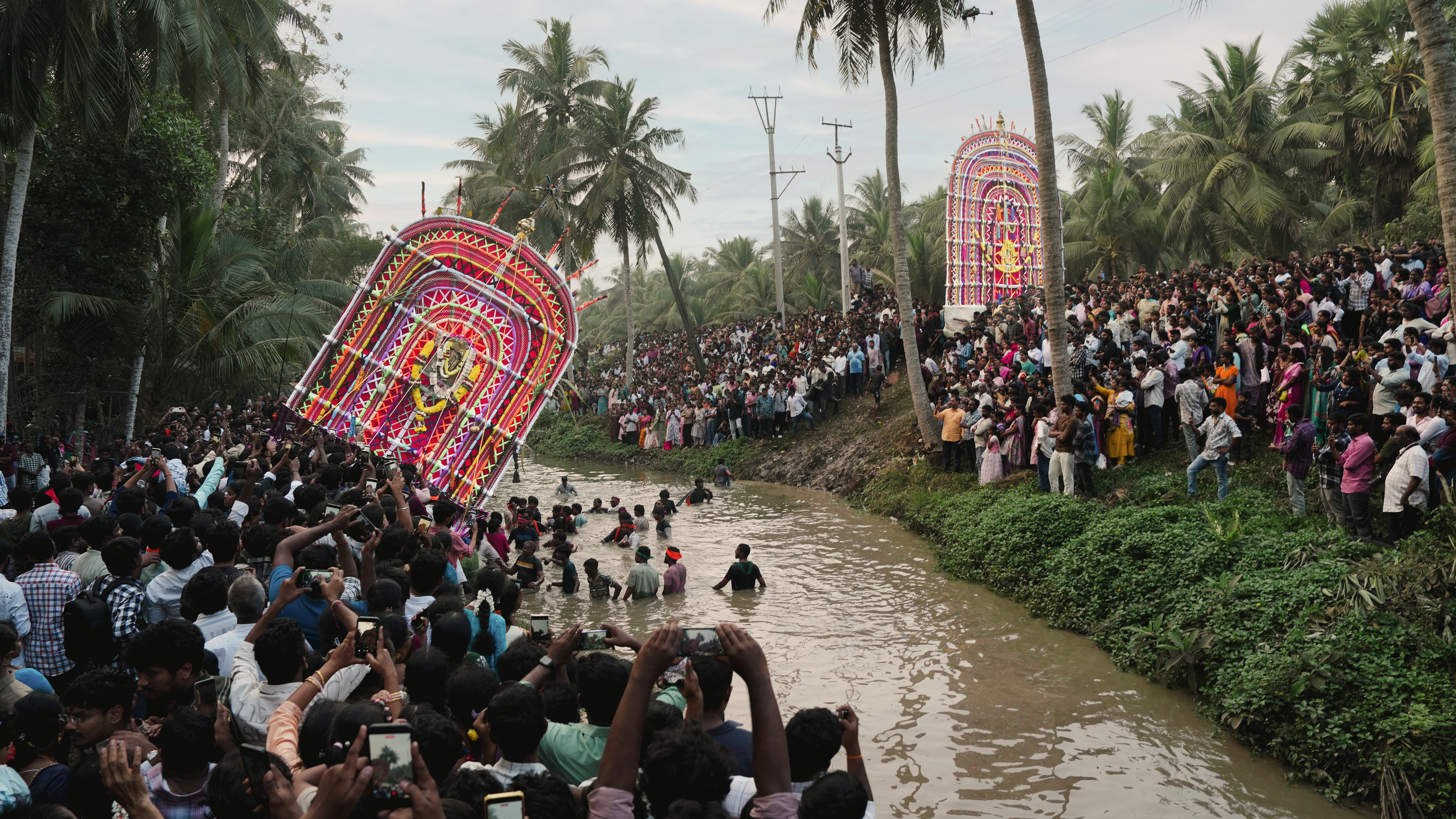
Konaseema Prabhala Teertham, Korlagunta, Mamidikuduru

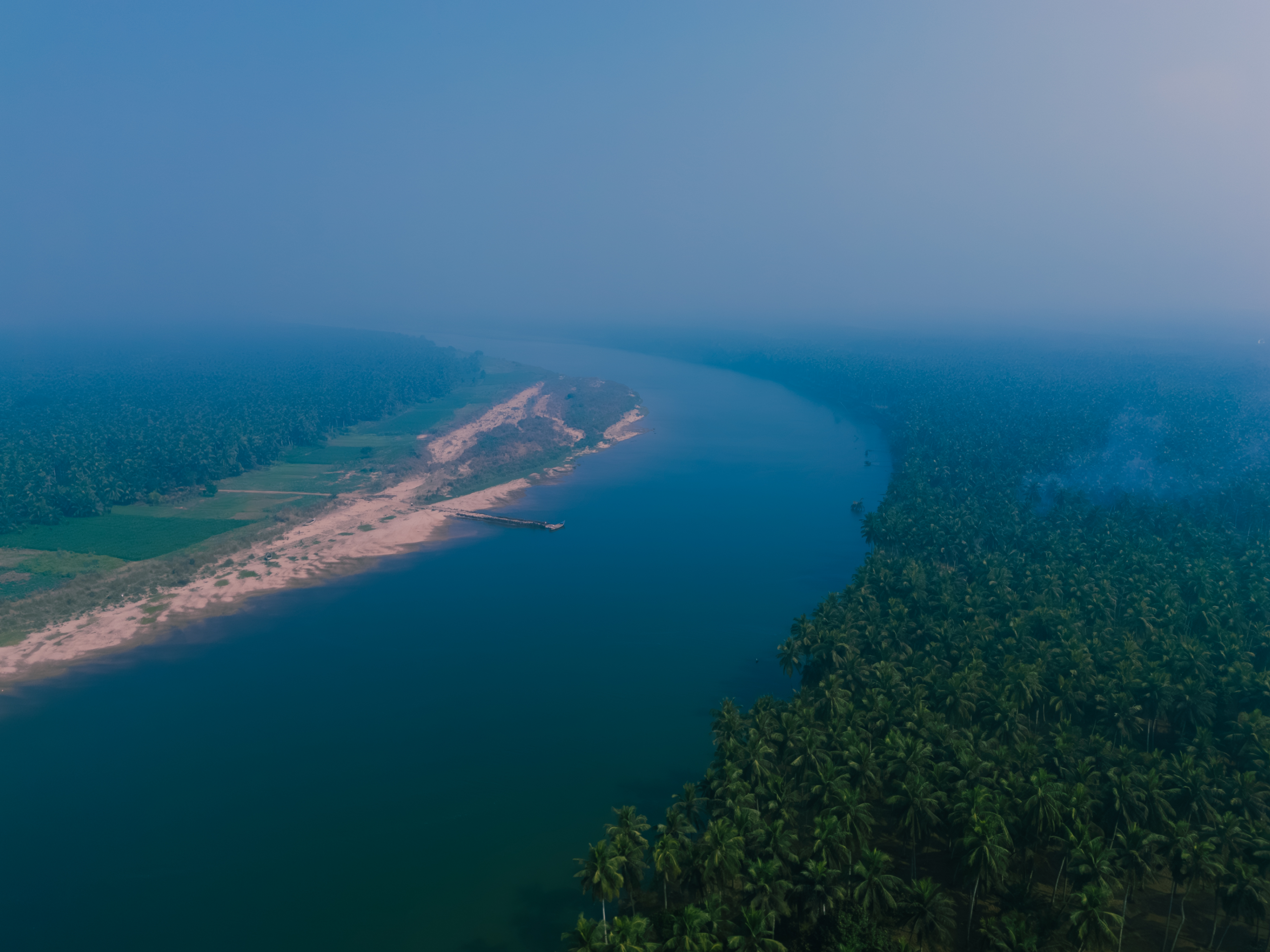
Godavari River Aerial View, Ayodhyalanka - Konaseema

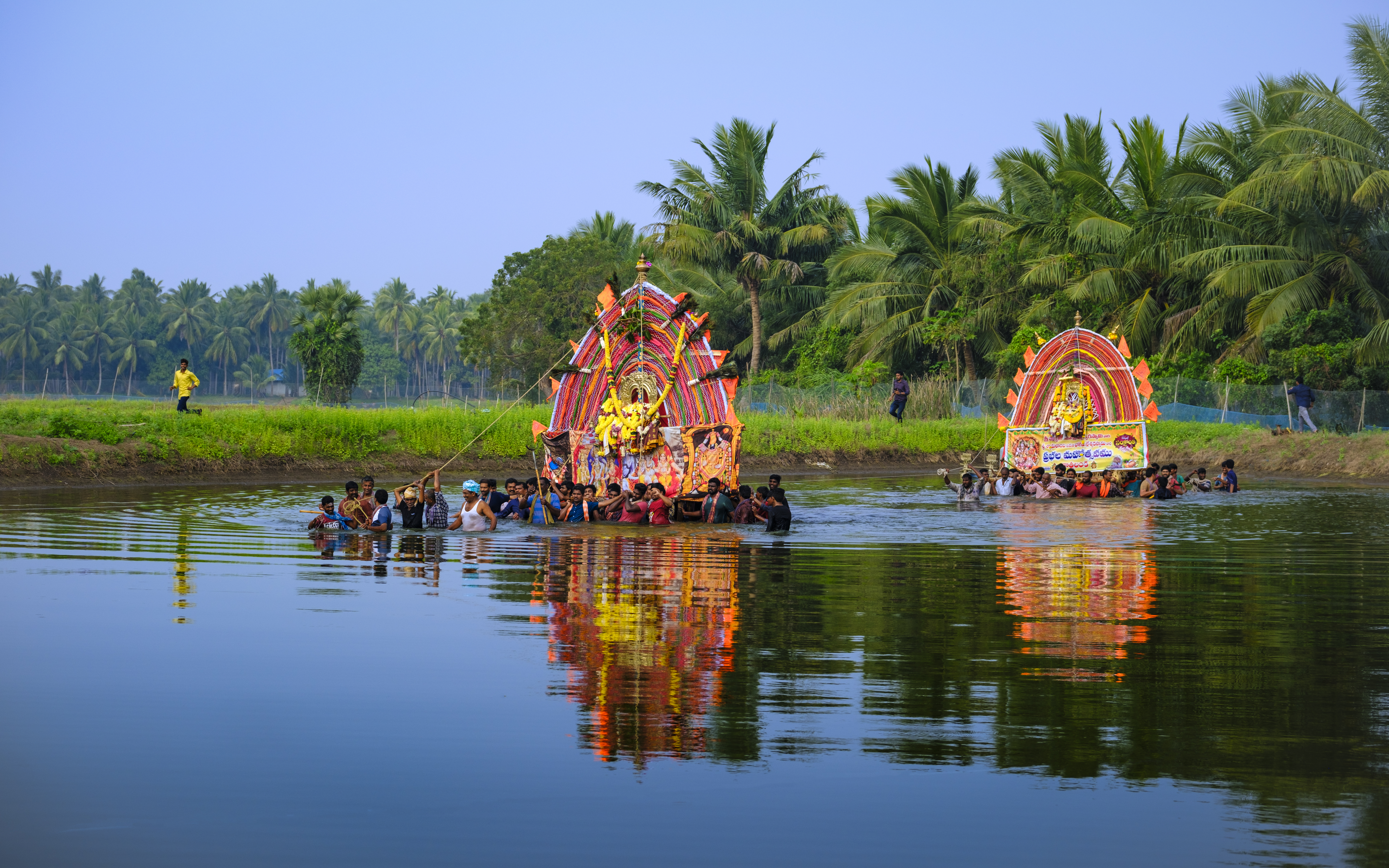
Prabhala Teertham festival in Konaseema

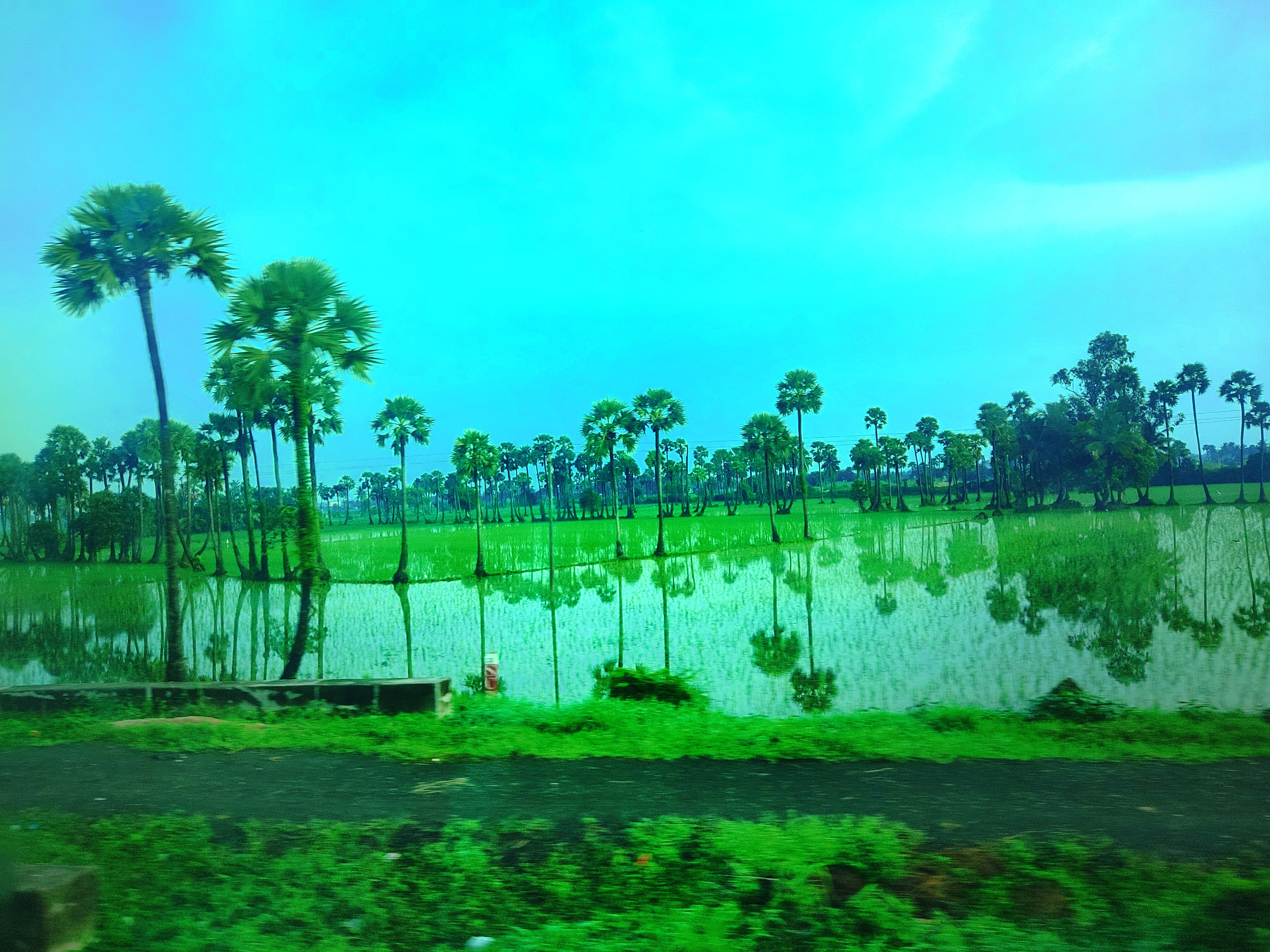
Paddy fields in Konaseema

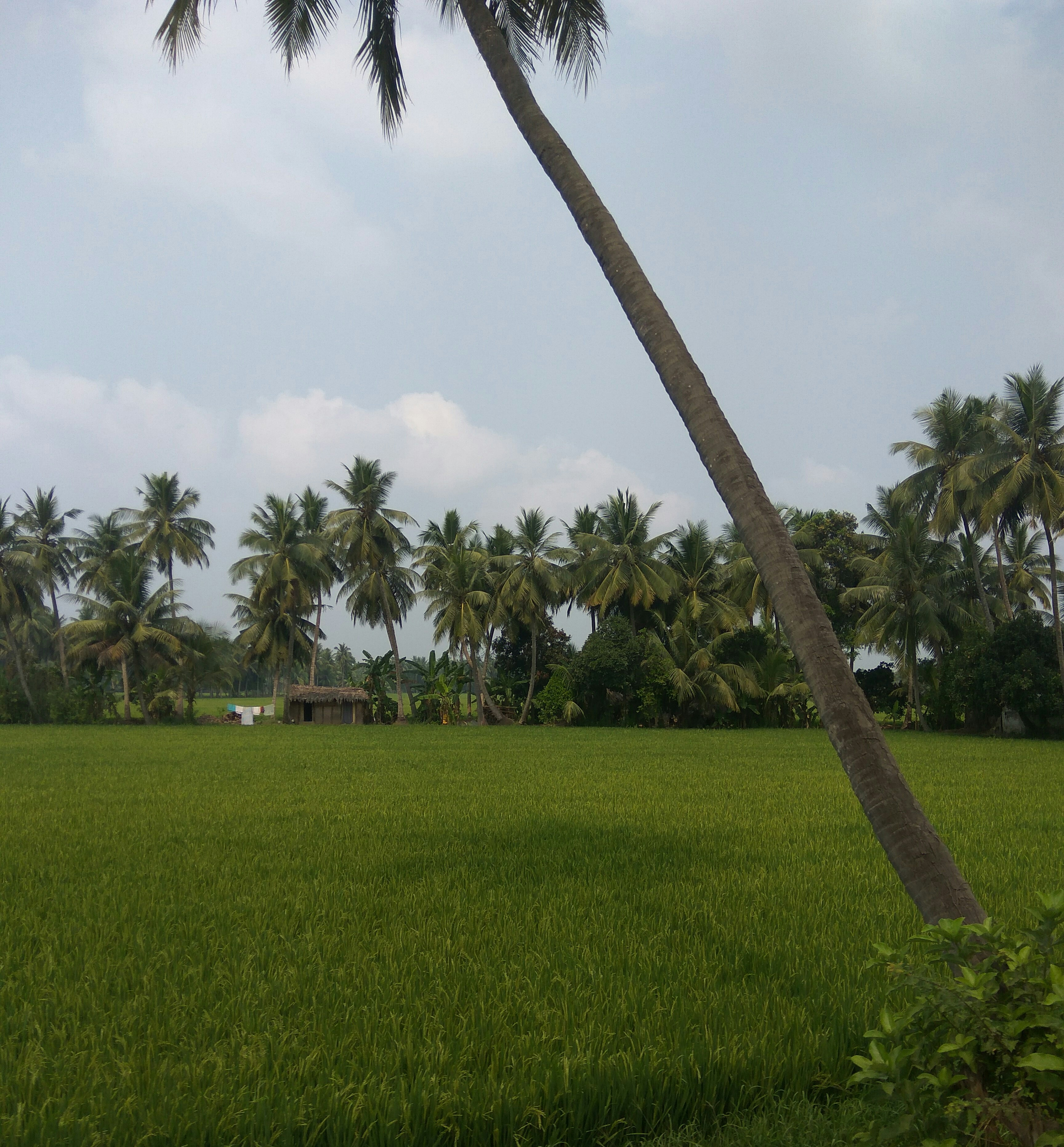
Field surrounded by coconut trees

Konaseema is a group of islands between the tributaries of the Godavari River and Bay of Bengal located in Dr. B. R. Ambedkar Konaseema district of Andhra Pradesh in southern India. It is nicknamed "God's own creation" due to similarities with the Kerala backwaters.

== Geography ==
The Godavari delta is surrounded by the tributaries of Vruddha Godavari, Vasishta Godavari, Gautami and Nilarevu rivers.

After passing the city of Rajamahendravaram, the Godavari River divides into two distributaries, the Vruddha Gautami (Gautami Godavari) and the Vasishta Godavari, which then further splits into the Gautami and the Nilarevu. Similarly, the Vasishta splits into two branches, the Vasishta and the Vainateya. These branches form a delta 170 kilometres (110 mi) long along the coast of the Bay of Bengal. This delta makes up the Konaseema region.

Amalapuram is the largest town in Konaseema, followed by Razole, Ravulapalem, Kothapeta, and Mummidivaram.

The arched entrance to the Konaseema region was intended to complement the natural colours of the region's land and plant life.

=== Dindi ===
Dindi is a region within the Konaseema islands which borders the region of Ramarajulanka.

It is known for its virgin backwaters and features palm-fringed lakes, canals, and lagoons dotting the coconut groves. It is 80 kilometres (50 mi) from Rajamahendravaram.

There are two resorts in Dindi which are constructed on the banks of Godavari river.

== Economy ==
This region is mostly known for its coconut trees and paddy fields. Coconuts grown in Konaseema are widely exported to various places in India.

== Pilgrim Places ==
Konaseema has many ancient pilgrim places. Some of them include:

- Ainavilli
- Antarvedi
- Ryali
- Gudapalli
- Mandapalli
- Vadapalli
- Appanapalli
- Muramalla
- Palivela
- Vanapalli
- Kundaleswaram

== See also ==
- Coastal Andhra
- APTDC
- Ramarajulanka
- Rajamahendravaram
