= State Highway 294 (Andhra Pradesh) =

Road in Andhra Pradesh, India

State Highway 294

Route information
- Maintained by Andhra Pradesh Road Development Corporation
- Length: 14.74 km (9.16 mi)

Major junctions
- From: Amalapuram, Dr. B. R. Ambedkar Konaseema district, Andhra Pradesh
- National Highway 216 in Amalapuram
- To: Bendamurulanka, Dr. B. R. Ambedkar Konaseema district, Andhra Pradesh

Location
- Country: India
- State: Andhra Pradesh
- Districts: Dr. B. R. Ambedkar Konaseema district
- Primary destinations: Amalapuram, Allavaram, Godilanka, Mogallamuru, Bendamurulanka, Odalarevu

Highway system
- Roads in India; Expressways; National; State; Asian; State Highways in Andhra Pradesh

State Highway 294 (Andhra Pradesh) is a state highway in the Indian state of Andhra Pradesh. Total length of SH294 is 14.74 kilometres (9.16 mi).

== Route ==
SH294 runs in Dr. B. R. Ambedkar Konaseema district of Andhra Pradesh, India. It starts from Perurupeta in Amalapuram and passes through Allavaram, Godilanka, Mogallamuru and ends at Bendamurulanka, extending further to Odalarevu.

== See also ==
- List of state highways in Andhra Pradesh
