= Peravaram =

- Village
- Interactive map of Peravaram
- Location in Andhra Pradesh, India
- Coordinates: 16°50′2.97″N 81°47′12.85″E
- Country: India
- State: Andhra Pradesh
- District: Dr. B.R. Ambedkar Konaseema
- Talukas: Atreyapuram

Area
  - Total: 10.34 km^{2} (3.99 sq mi)
- Elevation: 430 m (1,410 ft)

Population (2011)
  - Total: 6,763
  - Density: 654.1/km^{2} (1,694/sq mi)

Languages
  - Official: Telugu
- Time zone: UTC+5:30 (IST)

Peravaram is a village located in Dr. B.R. Ambedkar Konaseema district of the Indian state of Andhra Pradesh. It is located in Atreyapuram Mandal of Amalapuram revenue division.
