= Devarapalle =

Devarapalle or Devarapalli may refer to:

== Places in Andhra Pradesh, India ==
- Devarapalle, Ravulapalem Mandal, Konaseema district, a village
- Devarapalli, Anakapalli district, a mandal and village
- Devarapalle, West Godavari district, a village
- Devarapalle mandal, East Godavari district, and a village in the mandal

== People ==
- Devarapalli Prakash Rao (1958–2021), Indian social worker from Odisha
