= Ubalanka =

- Village
- Interactive map of Ubalanka
- Location in Andhra Pradesh, India
- Coordinates: 16.7807°N 81.8238°E
- Country: India
- State: Andhra Pradesh
- District: Konaseema

Government
  - Constituency: Kothapeta
  - MLA: Bandaru Satyananda Rao

Population (2011)
  - Total: 7,700

Languages
  - Official: Telugu
- Time zone: UTC+5:30 (IST)
- PIN: 533237
- Vehicle registration: AP
- Coastline: 0 kilometres (0 mi)

Ubalanka is a village in the Ravulapalem mandal of Konaseema district, Andhra Pradesh, India. It is located 2.3 kilometres (1.4 mi) from the mandal headquarters, Ravulapalem, and 67 kilometres (42 mi) from the district capital, Kakinada. The village is situated on the banks of the Godavari River, which provides highly fertile soil for agriculture. Ubalanka is well known for its prominent contractors and business community. It is also surrounded by lush coconut trees, paddy fields, and banana plantations, making it a scenic location.

== History ==
Ubalanka has a long-standing reputation for its contributions to the construction industry, producing many contractors. In the 1990s, the village was a major hub for the tobacco trade, supplying large quantities to different parts of Andhra Pradesh. However, with economic changes, many residents transitioned into contracting business, leading to significant financial growth.

== Geography ==
Ubalanka is bordered by the villages of Ravulapalem, Ryali, Merlapalem, and Chinnavaripalem. The Godavari River ensures high agricultural productivity in the region. The village is well connected by road transport, with services from the Andhra Pradesh State Road Transport Corporation (APSRTC) and private operators.

== Demographics ==
According to the 2011 Census of India, Ubalanka has:

- Total Population: 7,700
- Male Population: 3,900
- Female Population: 3,800
- Households: 1,935
