= Vankayala =

Vankayala (Telugu: వంకాయల) is a Telugu surname.

== Overview ==
The Vankayala family name has a history of more than 1000 years. Their mother tongue is Telugu. This surname is mainly found in the Veginadu sub-sect of Brahmin community. This surname is found in the Balija, Vysya and Reddy communities also. The surname is now found all over Andhra Pradesh, Tamil Nadu, Orissa and Karnataka states of India.

== History ==
The Vankayala families have been residing in the Godavari river delta basin, known as Konaseema area of East Godavari District, West Godavari District and Chittoor of Andhra Pradesh for many centuries. The family name is derived from the name of the vegetable Vankaya (Brinjal / Eggplant). Vankayala families, originally based out of West Godavari and Chittoor has migrated to many places including Andhra Pradesh, Telangana, Tamil Nadu, Karnataka, Orissa, Singapore, USA, and Canada. Brahmins (Veginati sect) among the Vankayala clan are mainly from Vizianagaram District but now are scattered to many areas. There is a curious story about how this surname originated. Once a king who ruled over what is now known as West Godavari to Guntur went for hunting. He felt very tired and in his search for food and shelter, he happened to visit an old woman's house. She did not know that he was the king, but being kind-hearted, she cooked rice for him and served it to him along with 'Gutti vankaya koora' (clustered brinjal curry). The king relished the curry much and upon his return, he sent her valuable gifts and an order proclaiming their surname had been changed from the original Mantravadi to Vankayala. Since then they came to be known with the surname Vankayala.

== Personalities ==
- Mahamahopadhyaya Sri Vankayala Narasimham - Mridangam artist (guru), Visakhapatnam.
- Vankayala Balarama Bhukta and Raghurama Bhukta brothers were Bhamakalapam exponents of Venkata Bhyripuram village in Vizianagaram district, Andhra Pradesh, India. Adibhatla Narayanadasu, great Harikatha exponent was their disciple for some time.
- Vankayala Sivarama Krishna - Writer, translator. banker. Translated "Gitanjali" of Rabindranath Tagore, and poems of many noted English poets into Telugu, Rajahmundry (Rajamahendravaram). His Gitanjali in Telugu has been acclaimed as one of the best translations.

Some Vysya community stalwarts like Vankayala Satyanarayana, noted film actor is also famous, who bear this surname.

== About ==
Vankayala Families having good reputations across and are usually considered to be well-off.

== Roads ==
Few roads are named after the Family name.

- Vankayala vari veedhi, Rajamundry, AP

Vankayala Vari Veedhi + Venuthanapalli + Puthallpattu Mandal + Chittoor +Andhra Pradesh
