= Visveswarapuram =

Visveswarapuram is a village in Dr. B.R. Ambedkar Konaseema district of the Indian state of Andhra Pradesh. It is located in Malikipuram Mandal of Amalapuram revenue division. It is also a locality in the city of Bengaluru, in the Indian state of Karnataka.
