= Godilanka =

- Village
- Interactive map of Godilanka
- Location in Andhra Pradesh, India
- Coordinates: 16.5170°N 81.9884°E
- Country: India
- State: Andhra Pradesh
- District: Dr. B.R. Ambedkar Konaseema
- Mandal: Allavaram mandal
- Talukas: Allavaram

Area
  - Total: 4.12 km^{2} (1.59 sq mi)

Population (2011)
  - Total: 1,750
  - Density: 425/km^{2} (1,100/sq mi)

Languages
  - Official: Telugu
- Time zone: UTC+5:30 (IST)
- PIN: 533217
- Vehicle Registration: AP05 (Former); AP39 (from 30 January 2019)

Godilanka is a village in Allavaram mandal, Doctor B.R. Ambedkar Konaseema district of Andhra Pradesh. This is located at 4 km from Allavaram, mandal headquarters, and at 12 km from Amalapuram, the nearest town.

== Demographics ==
As per 2011 census, the village has 470 houses and its population is 1750. The male population is 853 while the female population is 897.

== Landuse ==
The village has an area of 412 hectares. Out of this, 352 hectares are used for agriculture which includes 109 hectares under irrigation.

=== Main crops ===
Paddy, coconut, acquaculture of prawns.
