= Devaguptam =

- Village
- Interactive map of Devaguptam
- Location in Andhra Pradesh, India Devaguptam (India)
- Coordinates: 16.509997°N 82.035572°E
- Country: India
- State: Andhra Pradesh
- Region: Allavaram
- District: Dr. B.R. Ambedkar Konaseema

Languages
  - Official: Telugu
- Time zone: UTC+5:30 (IST)
- PIN: 533217

Devaguptam is situated in Dr. B.R. Ambedkar Konaseema district in Allavaram Mandal, in Andhra Pradesh State.
