= Malikipuram =

- Town
- Location in Andhra Pradesh, India Malikipuram (India)
- Coordinates: 16.40944°N 81.80333°E
- Country: India
- State: Andhra Pradesh
- District: Dr. B.R. Ambedkar Konaseema
- Mandal: Malikipuram

Languages
  - Official: Telugu
- Time zone: UTC+5:30 (IST)
- PIN: 533253
- Telephone code: 08862
- Vehicle Registration: AP05 (Former); AP39 (from 30 January 2019)
- Nearest city: Palakollu

Malikipuram is a town of Dr. B.R. Ambedkar Konaseema district in Andhra Pradesh, India. It is located in the Amalapuram revenue division.

Malikipuram is located 30 km from the district's main city, Amalapuram, and 249 km from Visakhapatnam. Nearest Railway station Palakollu Sri Mudunuri Soma Sundara Sekhara Bhupala Raju Garu was the first Zamindar of Malikipuram with more than 100 acres of land. He donated many acres of land for the establishment of a school, college and hospital in Malikipuram. He was the chief land donor for AFDT junior, UG & PG colleges. He contested for president post in Malikipuram in the 1950s and 60s. His family members used to have imported cars and bikes and gold in hundreds of kgs in those days. Panduvva Zamindar - Sri Vegesna Kanaka Raju Garu, former TTD chairman was his brother-in-law.

== Tourist attractions ==
Antarvedi, in terms of geographical surface area, covers about 6.4 km^{2}. The village contains the Lord Sri Lakshminarasimha Swamy temple, located opposite Vasishta Godavari. A launch pad allows visitors to land on the small island at the other side of the Godavari River - from this point, travel can then be undertaken to the convergence point of the river and the ocean.

Dindi Resort: The Godavari River island supports acres of coconut groves.

Samudra Beach Resort: Samudra Beach Resort is located in Odalarevu.

== Demographics ==
The total population of Malikipuram is 6,286, with 3,265 males and 3,021 females living in 1,651 houses. The total area of Malikipuram is 244 hectares.

== Education ==
Colleges near Malikipuram: Mvn js rvr college of arts and science

- Amrutha Arts & Science Degree College
- Sri Deepthi Mahila Degree College
- M. G. Jr. College, Lakkavaram

Schools near Malikipuram:

- MPPUP HIGH school,malikipuram
- ZP P High School, Visweswarayapuram
- Z P High School, Gudimellanka
- Z P High School, Gollapalem
- Gowtham Model School, Malikipuram
