= Velicheru =

Village in Andhra Pradesh, India

- Village
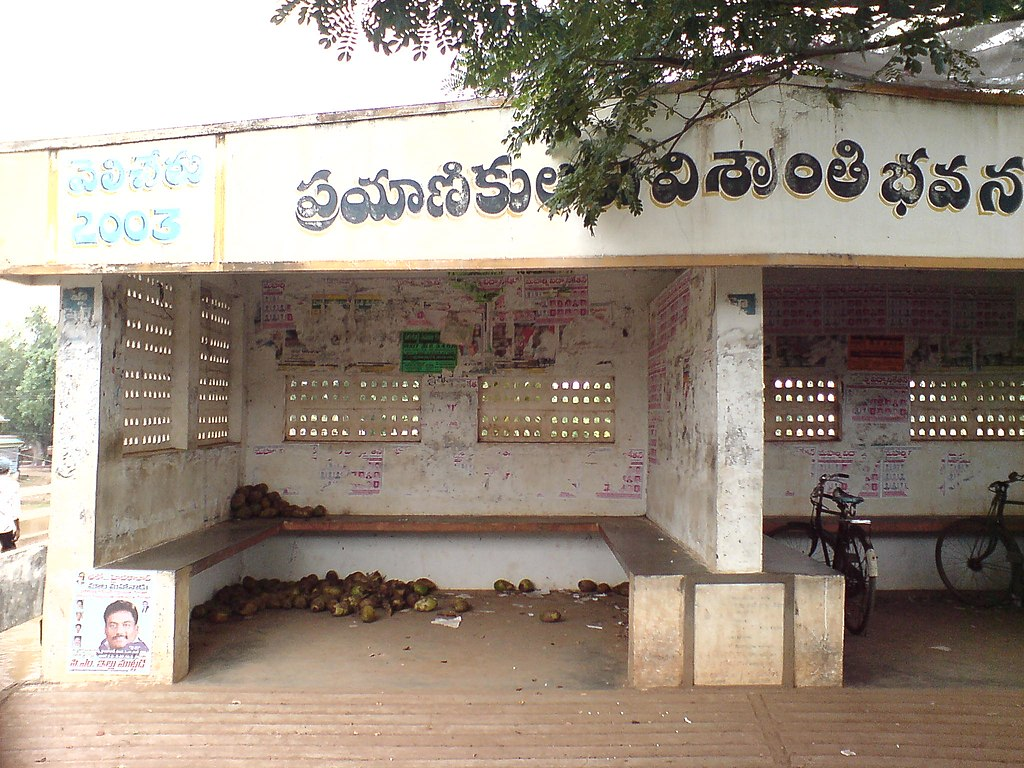
- Bus Stop of Velicheru
- Interactive map of Velicheru
- Location within Andhra Pradesh
- Coordinates: 16.87°N 81.75°E
- Country: India
- State: Andhra Pradesh
- District: Dr. B.R. Ambedkar Konaseema
- Mandal: Atreyapuram

Population (2011)
  - Total: 4,627
- Time zone: UTC+5:30 (IST)
- PIN Code: 533235

Velicheru is one of the 15 villages of Atreyapuram Mandal, located in Dr. B.R. Ambedkar Konaseema district of the Indian State of Andhra Pradesh. It is located at a distance of 16km from the municipal corporation of Rajahmundry.

== Geography ==
Velicheru is located at 16.87°N, 81.75°E. It is geographically located in the delta region formed by the bifurcation of the river Godavari. Velicheru shares its boundary with both the distributaries of Godavari i.e., the Vasishta Godavari and the Gautami Godavari.

Various crops like Paddy, Banana and various types of flowers like Lily, Chrysanthemum are cultivated in the village. The soil in the area, being highly fertile, allows cultivation of multiple crops in a year.

== Transport ==
Velicheru has regular government operated buses to the nearby city of Rajahmundry as well as Ravulapalem. From there, buses, trains and flights are available for travelling to various parts of the country.

Apart from buses, passengers can avail services of Auto Rickshaws which are frequently used in this route.

Nearest railway station is Rajahmundry railway station and airport is Rajahmundry airport located at distances of 16km and 33km respectively.
