= Konaseema (disambiguation) =

Konaseema may refer to:

- Dr. B. R. Ambedkar Konaseema district
- Konaseema, a region in the Dr. B. R. Ambedkar Konaseema district with a group of islands in Andhra Pradesh, India
