= Kesanapalle =

- Village
- Interactive map of Kesanapalle
- Location in Andhra Pradesh, India Kesanapalle (India)
- Coordinates: 16°24′20″N 81°53′25″E
- Country: India
- State: Andhra Pradesh
- District: Dr. B.R. Ambedkar Konaseema

Area
  - Total: 18.26 km^{2} (7.05 sq mi)

Population (2011)
  - Total: 14,195
  - Density: 777.4/km^{2} (2,013/sq mi)

Languages
  - Official: Telugu
- Time zone: UTC+5:30 (IST)
- PIN: 533244

Kesanapalle is a village in Dr. B.R. Ambedkar Konaseema district of the Indian state of Andhra Pradesh State. It is located in Malikipuram Mandal of Amalapuram revenue division.
