= Narkedimilli =

- Village
- Interactive map of Narkedimilli
- Location in Andhra Pradesh, India Narkedimilli (India)
- Coordinates: 16°47′27″N 81°45′48″E
- Country: India
- State: Andhra Pradesh
- District: Dr. B.R. Ambedkar Konaseema

Area
  - Total: 4.97 km^{2} (1.92 sq mi)

Population (2011)
  - Total: 3,446
  - Density: 693/km^{2} (1,800/sq mi)

Languages
  - Official: Telugu
- Time zone: UTC+5:30 (IST)
- PIN: 533235

Narkedimilli is a village in Dr. B.R. Ambedkar Konaseema district of the Indian state of Andhra Pradesh. It is located in Atreyapuram Mandal of Amalapuram revenue division. Agriculture is the main source of income as it is located beside Godavari. Paddy is the main crop, followed by sugarcane and bananas.

== Population ==
Population Census	Total Population	Total Male	Total Female	Total Number of Houses
2011	3446	1761	1685	1100
