= Nanduri Venkata Subba Rao =

Indian poet

Nanduri Venkata Subbarao F.A., B.A., B.L. (16 December 1895 – 29 May 1957) was a famous Telugu poet. His famous works include Yenki Patalu (an anthology of songs on and by a woman called Yenki).

He was born in Vasanthavada in West Godavari district to Chinna Bapanna's parents. His father was village Karanam. He was closely related to Basavaraju Apparao, but considered his guru.

After primary education at Eluru, he joined in Kakinada for College studies. Failing in some examinations, he was encouraged and shifted to Chennai. He passed his F.A. and joined Madras Christian College. He worked as a teacher for some time and succeeded in obtaining Bachelor in Law. He practiced law from 1926 onwards in Eluru. But his main ambition was poetry which he continued till the last days.

== Enki Paatalu ==
Subba Rao conceptualized the idea of 'Enki Paatalu' during his student days at Madras Christian College in 1917–18. He used the local dialects of Godavari and Visakha areas in his poems and received mixed criticism among his peers and friends. The first edition of 'Enki Paatalu' was released in 1925. After a long gap of 27 years, the second edition was released with some new songs added. The poems left an indelible mark on the Telugu language and literature.

'Enki' and 'Naidu Bava' are the main characters of the Enki Paatalu. 'Enki' is a washer-woman who is in deep love with 'Naidu Bava'. The central theme of the poems is the love and romance between them. One of the most famous Telugu singers, Parupalli Ramkrishnayya, set tunes to Yenki Paatalu for the first time. Nanduri always used to sing his songs in the same tunes. Eminent writers and thinkers like Adavi Bapiraju, Sri Sri, Chalam, Devulapalli Krishna Sastry adored 'Enki Paatalu'. They gained public popularity due to the radio and music concerts.
