= Tadikona, Allavaram Mandal =

Tadikona
- village
- Interactive map of Tadikona
- Location in Andhra Pradesh, India Tadikona (India)
- Coordinates: 16.5254°N 82.0376°E
- Country: India
- State: Andhra Pradesh
- District: Dr. B.R. Ambedkar Konaseema

Area
  - Total: 4 km^{2} (1.5 sq mi)

Population (2011)
  - Total: 1,662
  - Density: 475/km^{2} (1,230/sq mi)

Languages
  - Official: Telugu
- Time zone: UTC+5:30 (IST)
- Postal code: 533 446

Tadikona is a village in Allavaram Mandal, Dr. B.R. Ambedkar Konaseema district in the state of Andhra Pradesh in India.

== Demographics ==
As of 2011 India census, Tadikona had a population of 1662, out of which 832 were male and 830 were female. The population of children below 6 years of age was 10%. The literacy rate of the village was 76%.
