= Rajavaram, Atreyapuram Mandal =

Rajavaram
- village
- Interactive map of Rajavaram
- Location in Andhra Pradesh, India Rajavaram (India)
- Coordinates: 16.9079°N 81.7446°E
- Country: India
- State: Andhra Pradesh
- District: Dr. B.R. Ambedkar Konaseema

Area
  - Total: 4 km^{2} (1.5 sq mi)

Population (2011)
  - Total: 2,803
  - Density: 781/km^{2} (2,020/sq mi)

Languages
  - Official: Telugu
- Time zone: UTC+5:30 (IST)
- Postal code: 533 446

Rajavaram is a village in Atreyapuram Mandal, Dr. B.R. Ambedkar Konaseema district in the state of Andhra Pradesh in India.

== Geography ==
Rajavaram is located at 16.9079°N 81.7446°E.

== Demographics ==
As of 2011 India census, Rajavaram had a population of 2803, out of which 1397 were male and 1406 were female. The population of children below 6 years of age was 10%. The literacy rate of the village was 66%.
