= Mummidivarappadu =

- village
- Interactive map of Mummidivarappadu
- Location in Andhra Pradesh, India Mummidivarappadu (India)
- Coordinates: 16.6899°N 81.8467°E
- Country: India
- State: Andhra Pradesh
- District: Dr. B.R. Ambedkar Konaseema

Area
  - Total: 3 km^{2} (1.2 sq mi)

Population (2011)
  - Total: 1,720
  - Density: 664/km^{2} (1,720/sq mi)

Languages
  - Official: Telugu
- Time zone: UTC+5:30 (IST)
- Postal code: 533 446

Mummidivarappadu is a village in Ravulapalem Mandal, Dr. B.R. Ambedkar Konaseema district in the state of Andhra Pradesh in India.

== Geography ==
Mummidivarappadu is located at 16.6899°N 81.8467°E.

== Demographics ==
As of 2011 India census, Mummidivarappadu had a population of 1,720, out of which 896 were male and 824 were female. The population of children below 6 years of age was 9%. The literacy rate of the village was 77%.
