= Thurupulanka =

- village
- Interactive map of Thurupulanka
- Location in Andhra Pradesh, India Thurupulanka (India)
- Coordinates: 16.4909°N 81.9996°E
- Country: India
- State: Andhra Pradesh
- District: Dr. B.R. Ambedkar Konaseema

Area
  - Total: 4 km^{2} (1.5 sq mi)

Population (2011)
  - Total: 1,707
  - Density: 427/km^{2} (1,110/sq mi)

Languages
  - Official: Telugu
- Time zone: UTC+5:30 (IST)
- Postal code: 533 446

Thurupulanka is a village in Allavaram Mandal, Dr. B.R. Ambedkar Konaseema district in the state of Andhra Pradesh in India.

== Demographics ==
As of 2011 India census, Thurupulanka had a population of 1707, out of which 862 were male and 845 were female. The population of children below 6 years of age was 8%. The literacy rate of the village was 82%.
