= Malikipuram mandal =

- Mandal
- Interactive map of Malikipuram mandal
- Country: India
- State: Andhra Pradesh
- District: Dr. B.R. Ambedkar Konaseema
- Population according to 2011 Census: 75,847
- Number of Villages: 11
- Area in Sq Km: 89.55
- Time zone: UTC+5:30 (IST)

Malikipuram mandal is one of the 22 mandals in Dr. B.R. Ambedkar Konaseema district of Andhra Pradesh. As per census 2011, there are 11 villages in this Mandal.

== Demographics ==
Malikipuram Mandal has total population of 75,847 as per the Census 2011 out of which 37,989 are males while 37,858 are females. The average Sex Ratio of Malikipuram Mandal is 997. The total literacy rate of Malikipuram Mandal is 81%.

== Towns and villages ==
=== Villages ===
1. Dindi
2. Gudapalli
3. Gudimellanka
4. Irusumanda
5. Kattimanda
6. Kesanapalle
7. Lakkavaram
8. Malikipuram
9. Mattaparru
10. Ramarajulanka
11. Sankaraguptam
12. Visveswarapuram
13. Chintalamori
14. Toorpupalem
15. Battelanka

== See also ==
- List of mandals in Andhra Pradesh
