= Utchili =

- village
- Interactive map of Utchili
- Location in Andhra Pradesh, India Utchili (India)
- Coordinates: 16.8437°N 81.7823°E
- Country: India
- State: Andhra Pradesh
- District: Dr. B.R. Ambedkar Konaseema
- Mandal: Atreyapuram

Area
  - Total: 2 km^{2} (0.77 sq mi)

Population (2011)
  - Total: 2,653
  - Density: 1,690/km^{2} (4,400/sq mi)

Languages
  - Official: Telugu
- Time zone: UTC+5:30 (IST)
- PIN: 533 446

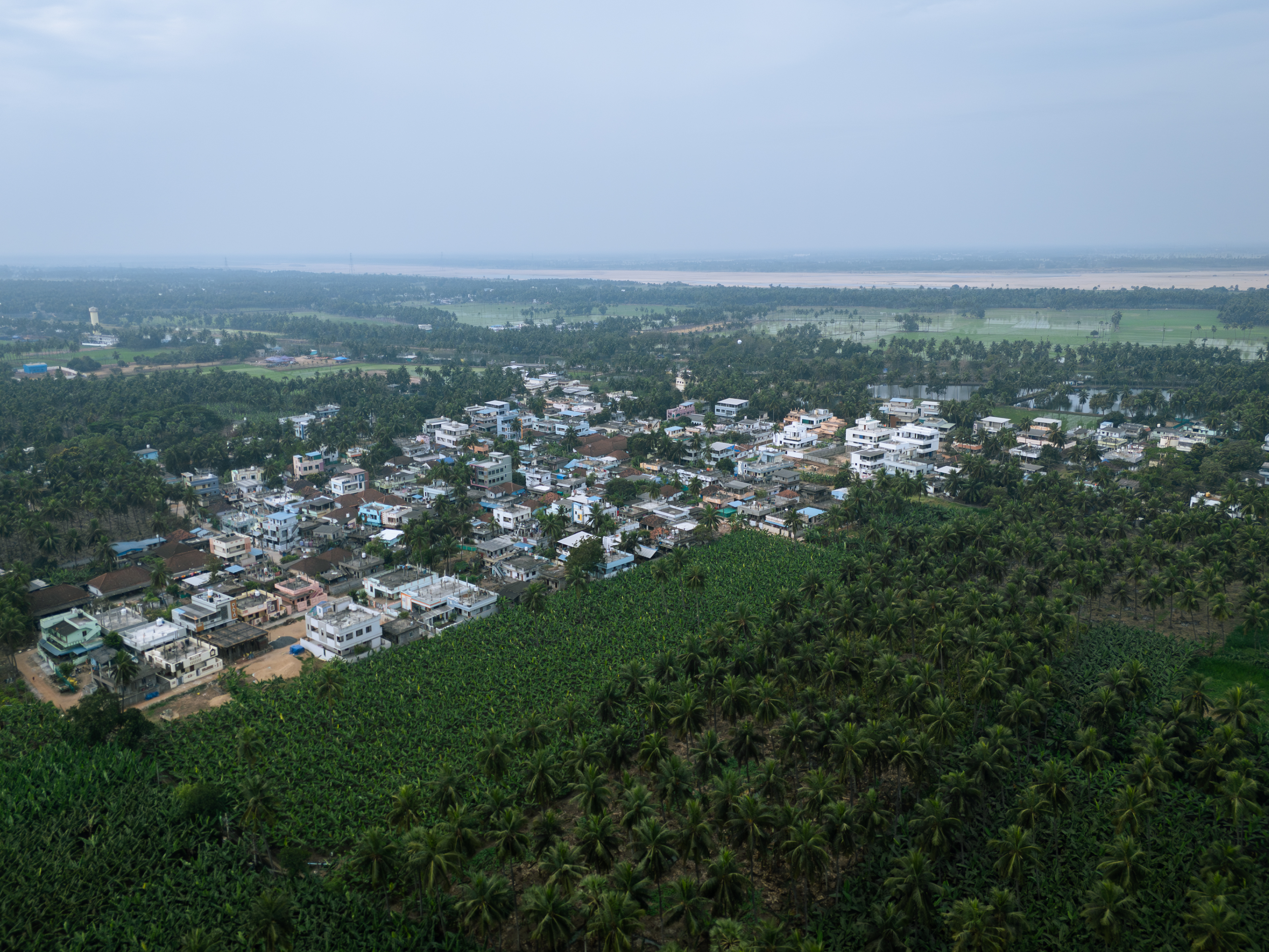
Aerial View of Utchili Village

Utchili or Uchili is a village in Atreyapuram Mandal, Dr. B.R. Ambedkar Konaseema district in the state of Andhra Pradesh in India.

== Population ==
Population Census	Total Population	Total Male	Total Female	Total Number of Houses
2011	2653	1317	1336	832
2001	2460	1232	1228	670

As of 2011 India census, Utchili had a population of 2693, out of which 1317 were male and 1336 were female. The population of children below 6 years of age was 10%. The literacy rate of the village was 66%.
