= Lolla, Atreyapuram Mandal =

Lolla
- village
- Interactive map of Lolla
- Location in Andhra Pradesh, India Lolla (India)
- Coordinates: 16.8123°N 81.8009°E
- Country: India
- State: Andhra Pradesh
- District: Dr. B.R. Ambedkar Konaseema

Area
  - Total: 6 km^{2} (2.3 sq mi)

Population (2011)
  - Total: 3,950
  - Density: 651/km^{2} (1,690/sq mi)

Languages
  - Official: Telugu
- Time zone: UTC+5:30 (IST)
- Postal code: 533 446

Lolla is a village in Atreyapuram Mandal, Dr. B.R. Ambedkar Konaseema district in the state of Andhra Pradesh in India.

== Geography ==
Lolla is located at 16.8123°N 81.8009°E.

== Demographics ==
As of 2011 India census, Lolla had a population of 3950, out of which 2038 were male and 1912 were female. The population of children below 6 years of age was 10%. The literacy rate of the village was 67%.
