= Gopalapuram, Ravulapalem Mandal =

Gopalapuram
- village
- Interactive map of Gopalapuram
- Location in Andhra Pradesh, India Gopalapuram (India)
- Coordinates: 16.7056°N 81.8180°E
- Country: India
- State: Andhra Pradesh
- District: Dr. B.R. Ambedkar Konaseema

Area
  - Total: 14 km^{2} (5.4 sq mi)

Population (2011)
  - Total: 9,679
  - Density: 717/km^{2} (1,860/sq mi)

Languages
  - Official: Telugu
- Time zone: UTC+5:30 (IST)
- Postal code: 533 446

Gopalapuram is a village in Ravulapalem Mandal, Dr. B.R. Ambedkar Konaseema district in the state of Andhra Pradesh in India.

== Geography ==
Gopalapuram is located at 16.7056°N 81.8180°E.

== Demographics ==
As of 2011 India census, Gopalapuram had a population of 9,679, out of which 4,886 were male and 4,793 were female. The population of children below 6 years of age was 10%. The literacy rate of the village was 77%.
