= Gudapalli =

- village
- Interactive map of Gudapalli
- Coordinates: 16°25′31″N 81°52′20″E
- Country: India
- State: Andhra Pradesh
- District: Dr. B.R. Ambedkar Konaseema

Area
  - Total: 12.22 km^{2} (4.72 sq mi)

Population (2011)
  - Total: 9,222
  - Density: 754.7/km^{2} (1,955/sq mi)

Languages
  - Official: Telugu
- Time zone: UTC+5:30 (IST)

Gudapalli is a village in Dr. B.R. Ambedkar Konaseema district of the Indian state of Andhra Pradesh. It is located in Malikipuram Mandal of Amalapuram revenue division.
