= Komaraju Lanka =

- village
- Interactive map of Komaraju Lanka
- Location in Andhra Pradesh, India Komaraju Lanka (India)
- Coordinates: 16.7617°N 81.8503°E
- Country: India
- State: Andhra Pradesh
- District: Dr. B.R. Ambedkar Konaseema

Area
  - Total: 6 km^{2} (2.3 sq mi)

Population (2011)
  - Total: 5,667
  - Density: 905/km^{2} (2,340/sq mi)

Languages
  - Official: Telugu
- Time zone: UTC+5:30 (IST)

Komaraju Lanka is a village in Ravulapalem Mandal, Dr. B.R. Ambedkar Konaseema district in the state of Andhra Pradesh in India.

== Geography ==
Komaraju Lanka is located at 16.7617°N 81.8503°E.

== Demographics ==
As of 2011 India census, Komaraju Lanka had a population of 5667, out of which 2875 were male and 2792 were female. The population of children below 6 years of age was 10%. The literacy rate of the village was 73%.
