= Konaseema Prabhala Teertham =

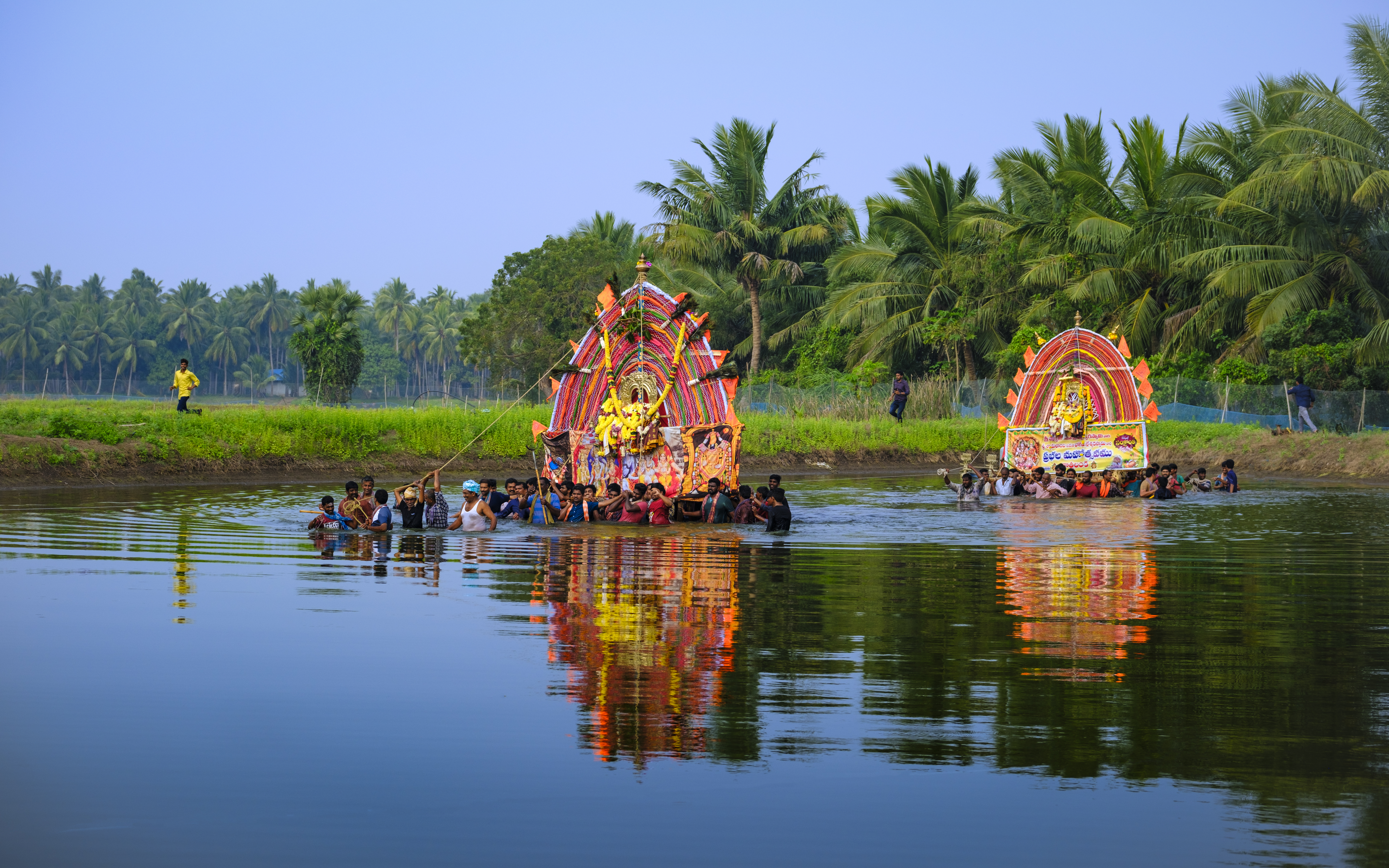
Prabhala theertham festival in Konaseema, where two Prabhas are being carried by the devotees.

Konaseema Prabhala Teertham, also known locally as Jaggannathota Prabhala Theertham, is a unique Hindu religious festival event that is celebrated annually on Kanuma day of Sankranti festival in Konaseema region of Andhra Pradesh, India. It was a four century-old event happening annually, it was declared as State festival by the Government of Andhra Pradesh before Sankranti 2026. People from 11 villages, where the 'Ekadasa Rudra temples' are situated, would at Jaggannathota with the Prabhalu (carried chariots), carrying Lord Shiva. During 2026 Republic Day celebrations, the Andhra Pradesh tableau showcased this Prabhala Teertham festival.
