= Kakinada Kaja =

Sweet pastry from India

Kakinada Kaja కాకినాడ కాజా
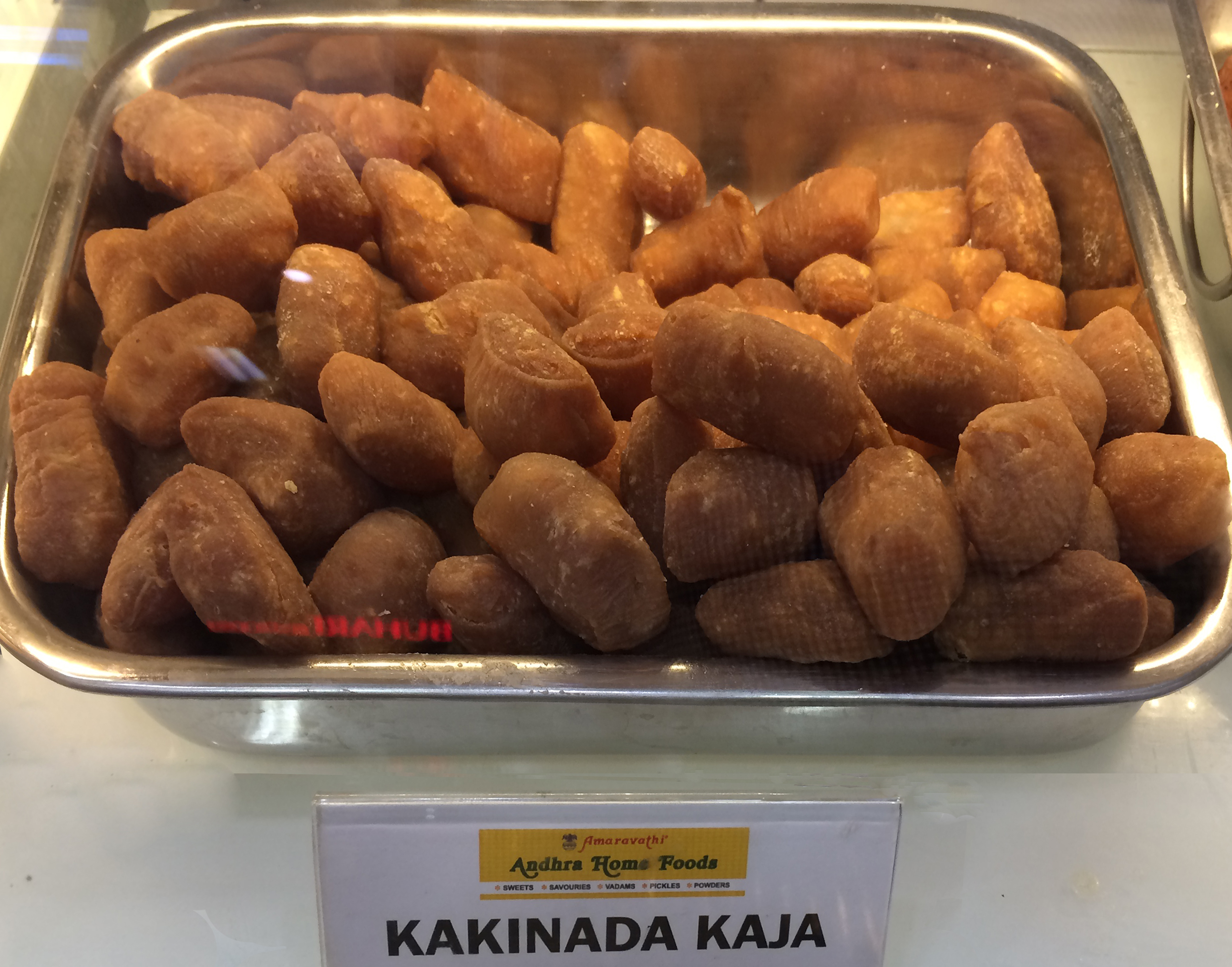
- Gottam Kaja, a variant of Kakinada Kaja
- Place of origin: India
- Region or state: Kakinada, Andhra Pradesh
- Main ingredients: Wheat flour, sugar, ghee
- Variations: Gottam Kaja, Madatha Kaja

Kakinada Kaja (Telugu: కాకినాడ కాజా) is a traditional Indian sweet pastry from Kakinada, Andhra Pradesh, India, known for its unique taste and preparation. It comes in two main varieties: the hollow, cylindrical Gottam Kaja and the layered Madatha Kaja, each offering distinct textures and flavours. The dessert holds significant cultural importance in Andhra Pradesh, with efforts underway to obtain a Geographical Indication (GI) tag to preserve its legacy. Along with the related Tapeswaram Kaja, it remains a beloved delicacy throughout the Telugu states.

== History ==
Kakinada Kaja originated in 1891 when Chittipeddi Kotaiah established a sweet shop in Kakinada specializing in this dessert. The shop, now operating as Kotaiah Sweets, has expanded its presence with branches in Kakinada and Rajahmundry.

The name Gottam Kaja derives from its hollow cylindrical shape, resembling a "cylinder" (gottam in Telugu). Made with maida and ghee, the dough is deep-fried and soaked in sugar syrup, resulting in a sweet with a crisp exterior and syrup-filled interior.

A related variant, Madatha Kaja or Tapeswaram Kaja, features layered sheets that retain sugar syrup in a diamond shape. Originating from Tapeswaram, a village near Kakinada, this variant has a distinct texture and slightly drier version compared to Gottam Kaja. Unlike the Gottam Kaja, this version holds the sugar syrup in its layers rather than inside it. Although Madatha Kaja is slightly different from Tapeswaram Kaja—with the former being drier—it is often conflated with the latter.

== Preparation and variants ==
The main ingredients in Kakinada Kaja include maida (refined flour), sugar, and edible oils. The pastry dough is prepared with a blend of flour, khoya (milk solids), and oil, shaped into desired forms, and deep-fried until golden. The fried pastries are then soaked in sugar syrup, giving them a unique texture and flavor.

There are two primary variants of Kakinada Kaja:

- Gottam Kaja: Characterized by its hollow cylindrical shape, this variant has a crisp exterior and a syrup-filled interior, offering a melt-in-the-mouth experience.
- Madatha Kaja: Made by rolling the dough into layered strips, this variant has a uniform texture but hardens over time.

== Cultural significance ==
As of August 2018, the Government of Andhra Pradesh began the process of applying for a Geographical Indication (GI) tag to recognize its cultural and regional importance. By October 2020, the Chittipeddi Kotaiah family, which has been producing the sweet since 1891, had also taken steps to secure the GI tag to preserve its legacy.

In 2022, the Indian Postal Service issued a special stamp to honour Kakinada Kaja, marking its cultural significance. The sweet remains a beloved dessert in Andhra Pradesh, with many Telugu people, whether traveling to Kakinada or its surrounding areas from other states or abroad, ensuring to purchase it as a cultural staple. Kakinada Kaja continues to be celebrated for its distinctive preparation and flavour, holding a special place in the culinary heritage of South India.

== See also ==
- Ariselu
- Boorelu
- Pootharekulu
- Sunnundallu
