= Podagatlapalli =

Podagatlapalle
- village
- Interactive map of Podagatlapalle
- Location in Andhra Pradesh, India Podagatlapalle (India)
- Coordinates: 16.7329°N 81.8172°E
- Country: India
- State: Andhra Pradesh
- District: Dr. B.R. Ambedkar Konaseema

Area
  - Total: 6 km^{2} (2.3 sq mi)

Population (2011)
  - Total: 6,797
  - Density: 1,096/km^{2} (2,840/sq mi)

Languages
  - Official: Telugu
- Time zone: UTC+5:30 (IST)
- Postal code: 533 446

Podagatlapalle is a village in Ravulapalem Mandal, Dr. B.R. Ambedkar Konaseema district in the state of Andhra Pradesh in India.

== Etymology ==
It is believed that this village which was not known to anyone for many years was found out later. It is therefore called Podagatlapalli (podagattu in vernacular means to find out; palli means village).

A small canal flows by the side of this village called Gorinkalakalva. A Maharshi once performed penance for a long time when his nails grew long and became curved. Vasishta who was requested by this sage that there should be a river in the latter's name readily granted the latter's desire. So the canal was called Goruvankaranadi and it gradually became Gorinkalakalva (goru in vernacular means a nail; vankara means curved and nadi means a river).

== Geography ==
Podagatlapalle is located at 16.7329°N 81.8172°E.

== Demographics ==
As of 2011 India census, Podagatlapalle had a population of 6,797, out of which 3,378 were male and 3,419 were female. The population of children below 6 years of age was 10%. The literacy rate of the village was 66%.

== Culture ==
Many Vedic Scholars and Sanskrit pundits hailed from this village. Well-known Mimamsa Scholar and President Award winner Remella Suryaprakash Sastry hails from this village. Also, the Indian Pharmacologist turned Management Consultant Kompella Srinivasa Peraiah Sastry I belongs to Kompella clan, also called Podagatlapalli Kompella (named after the village after the migration of some younger Kompellas to another village called Gopalapuram). The Pidaparthi family is known for writing and printing an almanac (panchangam) every year.

The S.P.S.S.R. Oriental College (Estd.1969) was a Sanskrit college established in the village by Kshatriyas. Renowned Sanskrit Scholar Acharya Sri Kompella Rama Suryanarayana (President Awardee) has worked as a Lecturer in this collage from 1970 to 1990. In olden days people from far used to come to this place to learn Sanskrit. Many mentally ill patients too come to the village for vedic and tantric solutions that cure their illnesses.

Viswanadha Foundation has set up Sri Sai Viswanadha Veda Vidya Peetham in Podagatlapalli on 1 November 2007.

On 12 January 2013, Jagadguru Shankaracharya Sri Sri Bharati Tirtha Mahaswamiji graced the village of Podagatlapalli and visited the Vishwanadha Veda Vidya Peetham and blessed the efforts to sustain Vedic education.
