= Atreyapuram mandal =

- Mandal
- Location in India
- Coordinates: 16°50′02″N 81°47′13″E
- Country: India
- State: Andhra Pradesh
- District: Dr. B.R. Ambedkar Konaseema
- Population according to 2011 Census: 65,580
- Number of Villages: 15
- Area in Sq Km: 86.11
- Time zone: UTC+5:30 (IST)

Atreyapuram mandal is one of the 22 mandals in Dr. B.R. Ambedkar Konaseema district of Andhra Pradesh. As per census 2011, there are 15 villages in this Mandal.

== Demographics ==
Atreyapuram Mandal has total population of 65,580 as per the Census 2011 out of which 33,096 are males while 32,484 are females. The average Sex Ratio of Atreyapuram Mandal is 982. The total literacy rate of Atreyapuram Mandal is 69%.

== Towns and villages ==
=== Villages ===
1. Ankampalem
2. Atreyapuram
3. Kattunga
4. Lolla
5. Merlapalem
6. Narkedimilli
7. Peravaram
8. Pulidindi
9. Rajavaram
10. Ryali
11. Utchili
12. Vadapalle
13. Vaddiparru
14. Velicheru
15. Vasanthawada

== See also ==
- List of mandals in Andhra Pradesh
