= Rellugadda =

- village
- Interactive map of Rellugadda
- Location in Andhra Pradesh, India Rellugadda (India)
- Coordinates: 16.5048°N 82.0146°E
- Country: India
- State: Andhra Pradesh
- District: Dr. B.R. Ambedkar Konaseema

Area
  - Total: 4 km^{2} (1.5 sq mi)

Population (2011)
  - Total: 985
  - Density: 267/km^{2} (690/sq mi)

Languages
  - Official: Telugu
- Time zone: UTC+5:30 (IST)
- Postal code: 533 446

Rellugadda is a village in Allavaram Mandal, Dr. B.R. Ambedkar Konaseema district in the state of Andhra Pradesh in India.

== Demographics ==
As of 2011 India census, Rellugadda had a population of 985, out of which 508 were male and 477 were female. The population of children below 6 years of age was 10%. The literacy rate of the village was 84%.
