= Kattunga =

- Village
- Interactive map of Kattunga
- Location in Andhra Pradesh, India Kattunga (India)
- Coordinates: 16.817482°N 81.778236°E
- Country: India
- State: Andhra Pradesh
- District: Dr. B.R. Ambedkar Konaseema

Government
  - Type: Democracy
  - Body: Panchayat

Population (2001)
  - Total: 3,722

Languages
  - Official: Telugu
- Time zone: UTC+5:30 (IST)
- PIN: 533235

Kattunga is a village in Atreyapuram Mandal, located in Dr. B.R. Ambedkar Konaseema district of the Indian state of Andhra Pradesh.
