= Vedireswaram =

- village
- Interactive map of Vedireswaram
- Location in Andhra Pradesh, India Vedireswaram (India)
- Coordinates: 16.7454°N 81.8430°E
- Country: India
- State: Andhra Pradesh
- District: Dr. B.R. Ambedkar Konaseema

Area
  - Total: 3 km^{2} (1.2 sq mi)

Population (2011)
  - Total: 6,944
  - Density: 2,255/km^{2} (5,840/sq mi)

Languages
  - Official: Telugu
- Time zone: UTC+5:30 (IST)
- Postal code: 533 446

Vedireswaram is a village in Ravulapalem Mandal, Konaseema district in the state of Andhra Pradesh in India.

== Geography ==
Vedireswaram is located at 16.7454°N 81.8430°E.

== Demographics ==
As of 2011 India census, Vedireswaram had a population of 6944, out of which 3530 were male and 3414 were female. The population of children below 6 years of age was 9%. The literacy rate of the village was 77%.
