= Pootharekulu =

Indian sweet from the state of Andhra Pradesh

Pootharekulu / పూతరేకులు
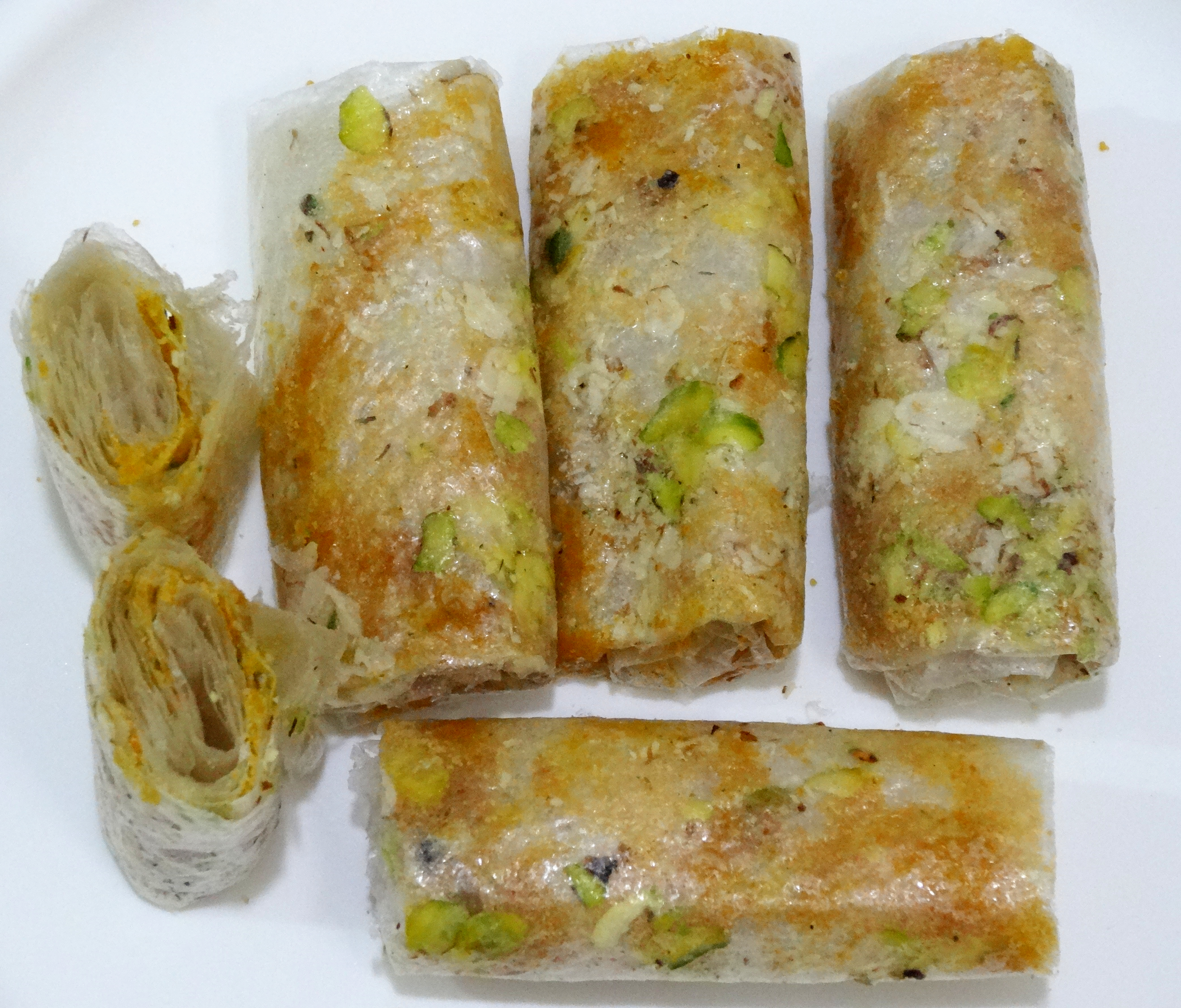
- Pootharekulu stuffed with jaggery and dry fruits
- Alternative names: Paper sweet
- Course: Snack
- Place of origin: Atreyapuram
- Region or state: East Godavari, Andhra Pradesh
- Created by: Atreyapuram
- Serving temperature: Room temperature
- Main ingredients: Rice starch/black gram, powdered sugar or jaggery, ghee
- Variations: Vegetable poothrekulu

Pootharekulu (plural) or poothareku (singular) is a popular Indian sweet from the Andhra Pradesh state of south India. The sweet is wrapped in a wafer-thin rice starch layer resembling paper and is stuffed with sugar, dry fruits and nuts. The sweet is popular for festivals, religious occasions and weddings in the Telugu states.

The name of the sweet literally means 'coated sheet' in the Telugu language—pootha means 'coating' and reku (plural rekulu) means 'sheet' in Telugu. The making of pootharekulu is a cottage industry in Atreyapuram, where around 400 families are dependent on the making and marketing of the sweet. As of October 2018, the state of Andhra Pradesh was said to be in the process of applying for Geographic Indication (GI) tag for the sweet.

== History ==
Pootharekulu were created in Atreyapuram, a village and mandal headquarters in the East Godavari district of Andhra Pradesh.

The sweet has a history of a few centuries (three centuries by some accounts). It is said that a village woman first prepared the sweet by adding sugar and ghee to leftover rice starch. Atreyapuram villagers soon started making wrappers from rice flour, put sugar and ghee inside and folded them. They supplied the sweets to candy manufacturers all over the two Telugu states.

Normally, women make pootharekulu in their free time while men are engaged in the marketing of the sweet. The annual turnover of the cottage industry is estimated to be Rs. 3 crore in 2016.

In August 2018, a group of cooks from East Godavari prepared a 10.5-meter long poothareku, as part of an attempt by the Andhra Pradesh tourism department to popularize Andhra cuisine.

== Preparation ==
Pootharekulu is made from a particular kind of rice batter called jaya biyyam ('biyyam' meaning rice), combined with powdered sugar and ghee (clarified butter). To make the edible film, a hot pot is prepared. To make the pot suitable, a hole is made in it, and to smoothen the surface for three days, the pot is alternately heated and wiped with a cloth dipped in oil. To make the films, coarse rice is ground for nearly two hours and made into a batter. This batter is then diluted; a thin cloth is dipped in the solution and put on the inverted pot with flame under it. The edible film forms on the pot instantly. The edible film is then wrapped with sugar and/or jaggery and coated with ghee.

== Varieties ==
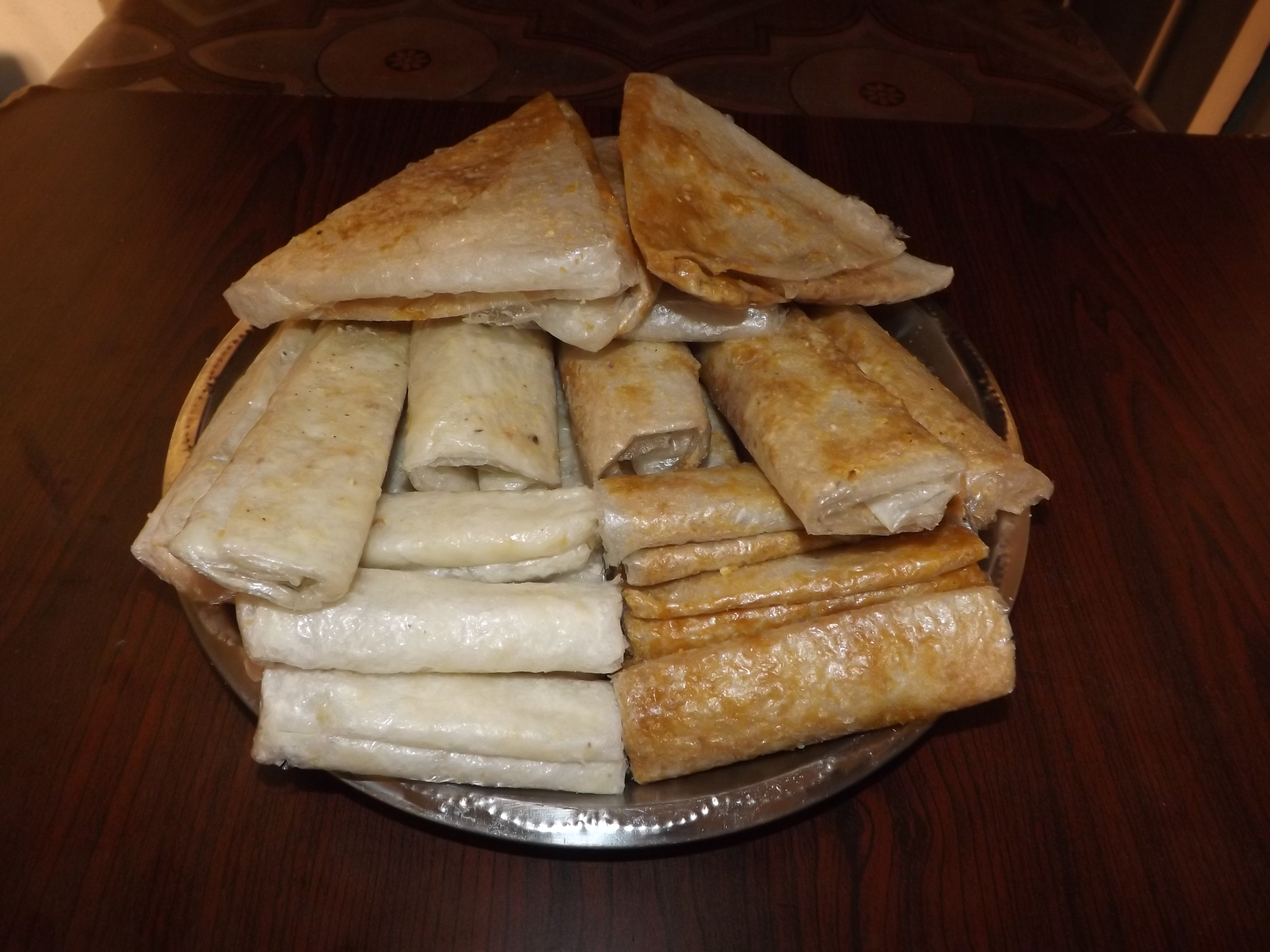
Pootharekulu filled with sugar (left) and jaggery (right)

Pootharekulu can be stuffed with different fillings, including fine powdered sugar, jaggery, dry fruits, and chocolate powder. Hot and spicy pootharekulu are a relatively new variant.

== See also ==
- List of stuffed dishes
- Kakinada Kaja
- Ariselu
- Sunnundallu
- Baklava
