= Samanthakuru =

- village
- Interactive map of Samanthakuru
- Location in Andhra Pradesh, India Samanthakuru (India)
- Coordinates: 16°28′30″N 82°02′18″E
- Country: India
- State: Andhra Pradesh
- District: Dr. B.R. Ambedkar Konaseema

Area
  - Total: 5 km^{2} (1.9 sq mi)

Population (2011)
  - Total: 3,386
  - Density: 626/km^{2} (1,620/sq mi)

Languages
  - Official: Telugu
- Time zone: UTC+5:30 (IST)
- Postal code: 533 446

Samanthakuru is a village in Allavaram Mandal, Dr. B.R. Ambedkar Konaseema district in the state of Andhra Pradesh in India.

== Demographics ==
As of 2011 India census, Samanthakuru had a population of 3386, out of which 1679 were male and 1707 were female. The population of children below 6 years of age was 10%. The literacy rate of the village was 65%.
