= Gudala, Allavaram Mandal =

Gudala
- village
- Interactive map of Gudala
- Location in Andhra Pradesh, India Gudala (India)
- Coordinates: 16.5371°N 82.0316°E
- Country: India
- State: Andhra Pradesh
- District: Dr. B.R. Ambedkar Konaseema

Area
  - Total: 6 km^{2} (2.3 sq mi)

Population (2011)
  - Total: 3,144
  - Density: 525/km^{2} (1,360/sq mi)

Languages
  - Official: Telugu
- Time zone: UTC+5:30 (IST)
- Postal code: 533 446

Gudala is a village in Allavaram Mandal, Dr. B.R. Ambedkar Konaseema district in the state of Andhra Pradesh in India.

== Demographics ==
As of 2011 India census, Gudala had a population of 3144, out of which 1594 were male and 1550 were female. The population of children below 6 years of age was 10%. The literacy rate of the village was 76%.
