= Juthigapadu =

- Village
- Interactive map of Juthigapadu
- Location in Andhra Pradesh, India Juthigapadu (India)
- Coordinates: 16.7184°N 81.8078°E
- Country: India
- State: Andhra Pradesh
- District: Dr. B.R. Ambedkar Konaseema

Area
  - Total: 0.36 km^{2} (0.14 sq mi)

Population (2011)
  - Total: 120
  - Density: 333/km^{2} (860/sq mi)

Languages
  - Official: Telugu
- Time zone: UTC+5:30 (IST)
- Postal code: 533 446

Juthigapadu is a village in Ravulapalem Mandal, Dr. B.R. Ambedkar Konaseema district in the state of Andhra Pradesh in India.

== Geography ==
Juthigapadu is located at 16.7184°N 81.8078°E.

== Demographics ==
As of 2011 India census, Juthigapadu had a population of 120, out of which 65 were male and 55 were female. The population of children below 6 years of age was 10%. The literacy rate of the village was 81%.
