= Odalarevu =

- Village
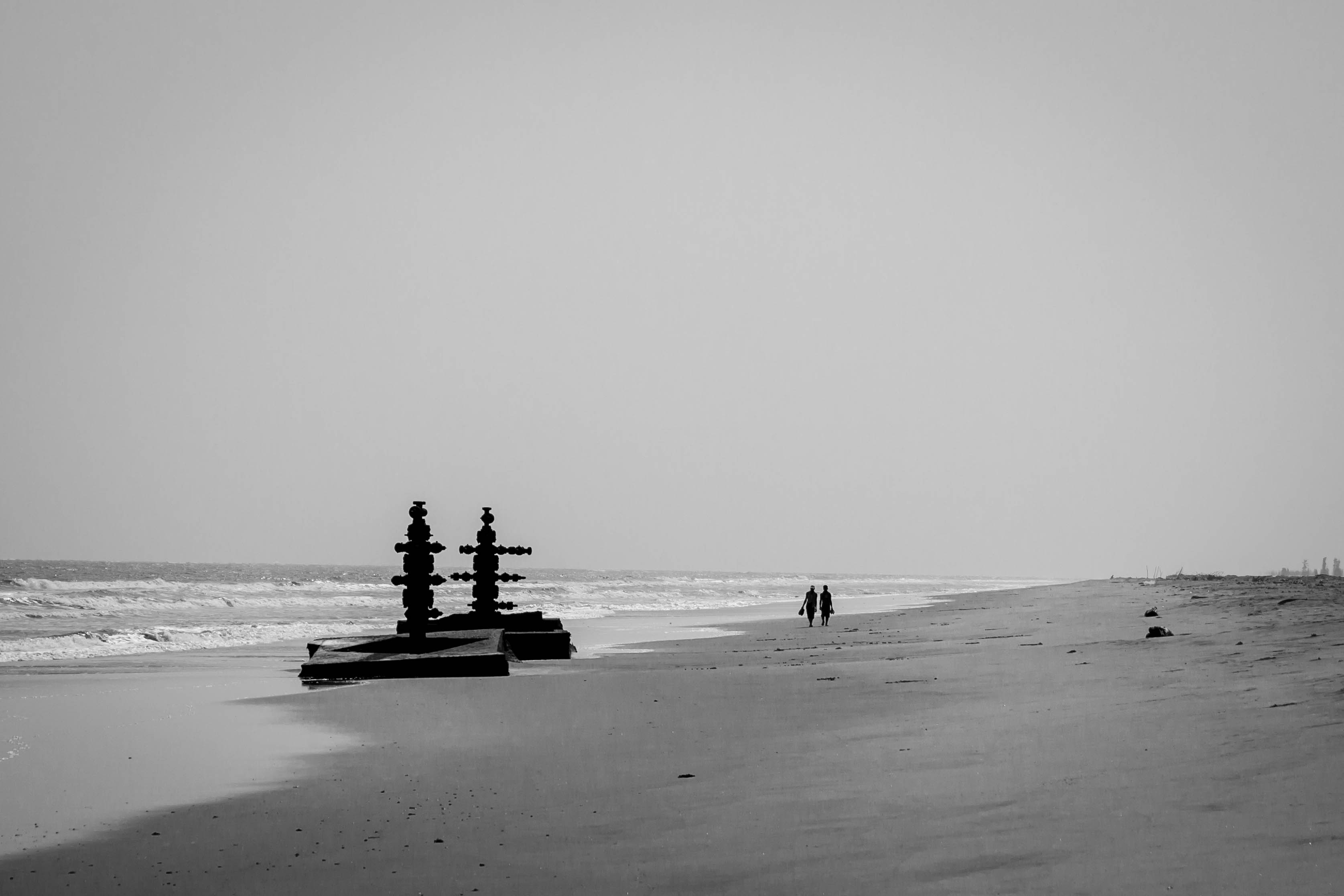
- Odalarevu beach
- Interactive map of Odalarevu
- Location in Andhra Pradesh, India Odalarevu (India)
- Coordinates: 16.4247°N 81.9707°E
- Country: India
- State: Andhra Pradesh
- District: Dr. B. R. Ambedkar Konaseema
- Mandal: Allavaram

Government
  - Type: Gram panchayat
  - Sarpanch: Malladi Mangayamma
- Time zone: UTC+5:30 (IST)
- Postal code: 533210

Odalarevu (also spelled as Vodalarevu) is a village located in the Allavaram mandal, Dr. B. R. Ambedkar Konaseema district of the Indian state of Andhra Pradesh. Situated in the coastal region of the state, the village is bounded by the Godavari River on one side and the Bay of Bengal on the other.

In terms of distance, Odalarevu is approximately 13 km (8.1 mi) away from the mandal headquarters, Allavaram. Additionally, it is around 23 km (14 mi) away from the district headquarters, Amalapuram.

== Geography ==
Odalarevu village enjoys a unique geographical advantage as it is situated between the Godavari River and the Bay of Bengal. These natural boundaries make it a destination for tourists.

== Economy ==
=== Agriculture ===
Agriculture forms the backbone of Odalarevu's economy. The region is known for its fertile soil and favorable climate, making it suitable for cultivating a variety of crops. Farmers in the village primarily grow paddy, coconut, banana, and other fruits and vegetables. Many farmers rely on traditional farming methods, while some have adopted modern techniques to improve productivity. As Odalarevu is located near the coast and is prone to heavy rainfall, the area is susceptible to flooding, especially during monsoon seasons or in the event of cyclones.

=== Fisheries ===
Odalarevu is also known for its fishing industry. The village is situated near the Bay of Bengal, providing easy access to marine resources. Fishing activities, including both traditional and mechanized fishing, contribute significantly to the local economy. Fishermen engage in activities such as trawling, gill netting, and crab and prawn farming.

In recent years, Odalarevu has faced environmental challenges related to fisheries waste and illegal prawn farms, leading to pollution of the ocean. Improper waste disposal practices and the presence of unauthorized prawn farms have resulted in the release of pollutants into the marine ecosystem.

=== ONGC Oil and Gas Terminal ===
The Oil and Natural Gas Corporation (ONGC) oil and gas terminal in Odalarevu which comes under Krishna Godavari Basin, plays a crucial role in the extraction and processing of oil and gas resources. ONGC is a prominent public sector undertaking involved in the exploration and production of hydrocarbons. The terminal serves as a major hub for storing, refining, and transporting these valuable resources. The presence of this facility contributes to the economic growth of the region and provides employment opportunities to the local population.

In December 2020 and February 2021 National Green Tribunal joint committee, consisting of representatives from various organizations, conducted site visits and found that oil leakage in the pipelines of the Odalarevu GGS (group gathering station) was causing damage to farming land and affecting water bodies. They recommended that Odalarevu GGS pay an environmental compensation of ₹56,850,000 (US$590,000) to the Central Pollution Control Board for violating environmental norms.

== Transportation ==
State Highway 294 passes through the village, connecting it to the district headquarters Amalapuram. APSRTC of Amalapuram depot operates the O021 Pallevelugu service from Amalapuram to Odalarevu with 14 trips a day, providing a reliable transportation schedule for commuters. The first bus from Odalarevu to Amalapuram departs at 05:00, and the initial bus from Amalapuram to Odalarevu starts at 06:10 in the morning, with subsequent trips scheduled throughout the day. The last trip from Odalarevu to Amalapuram leaves at 18:10 in the evening, and the final bus from Amalapuram to Odalarevu departs at 22:00 in the evening.

== Education ==
BVC (Bonam Venkata Chalamayya) Engineering College located in Odalarevu offers undergraduate programs in various fields of engineering and technology.
