= Ravulapalem mandal =

- Mandal
- Interactive Map Outlining mandal
- Location within Andhra Pradesh Location within India
- Country: India
- State: Andhra Pradesh
- District: Dr. B.R. Ambedkar Konaseema
- Population according to 2011 Census: 83,360
- Number of Villages: 11
- Area in Sq Km: 72.54
- Time zone: UTC+5:30 (IST)

Ravulapalem mandal is one of the 22 mandals in Dr. B.R. Ambedkar Konaseema district of Andhra Pradesh. As per census 2011, there are 11 villages in this mandal.

== Demographics ==
Ravulapalem Mandal has total population of 83,360 as per the Census 2011 out of which 41,862 are males while 41,498 are females. The average Sex Ratio of Ravulapalem Mandal is 991. The total literacy rate of Ravulapalem Mandal is 77%.

== Towns and villages ==
Nearest city is Rajahmahendravaram Nearest town is Mandapeta, Kothapeta

=== Villages ===
1. Devarapalle
2. Gopalapuram
3. Ithakota
4. Juthigapadu
5. Komaraju Lanka
6. Lakshmipolavaram
7. Mummidivarappadu
8. Podagatlapalle
9. Ravulapalem
10. Ubalanka
11. Vedireswaram

== See also ==
- List of mandals in Andhra Pradesh
