= Ankampalem =

- Village
- Interactive map of Ankampalem
- Location in Andhra Pradesh, India Ankampalem (India)
- Coordinates: 16.786998°N 81.774674°E
- Country: India
- State: Andhra Pradesh
- District: Dr. B.R. Ambedkar Konaseema

Population (2011)
  - Total: 5,275

Languages
  - Official: Telugu
- Time zone: UTC+5:30 (IST)
- PIN: 533236

Ankampalem is a village in Atreyapuram Mandal, located in Dr. B.R. Ambedkar Konaseema district of the Indian state of Andhra Pradesh.

== Population ==
| Population Census | Total Population | Total Male | Total Female | Total Number of Houses |
|---|---|---|---|---|
| 2011 | 5275 | 2659 | 2616 | 1545 |
| 2001 | 5132 | 2623 | 2509 | 1472 |
