= Komaragiripatnam =

- village
- Interactive map of Komaragiripatnam
- Location in Andhra Pradesh, India
- Coordinates: 16.4435°N 82.0084°E
- Country: India
- State: Andhra Pradesh
- District: Dr. B.R. Ambedkar Konaseema

Area
  - Total: 38 km^{2} (15 sq mi)

Population (2011)
  - Total: 12 thousand
  - Density: 350/km^{2} (910/sq mi)

Languages
  - Official: Telugu
- Time zone: UTC+5:30 (IST)
- Postal code: 533 210

Komaragiripatnam is a village in Allavaram Mandal, Dr. B.R. Ambedkar Konaseema district in the state of Andhra Pradesh in India.

== Geography ==
Komaragiripatnam is located at 16.4435°N 82.0084°E.

== Demographics ==
As of 2011 India census, Komaragiripatnam had a population of 16,197, out of which 6640 were male and 6557 were female. The population of children below 6 years of age was 9%. The literacy rate of the village was 79%.
