= Yentrikona =

- village
- Interactive map of Yentrikona
- Location in Andhra Pradesh, India Yentrikona (India)
- Coordinates: 16.5917°N 82.0216°E
- Country: India
- State: Andhra Pradesh
- District: Dr. B.R. Ambedkar Konaseema

Area
  - Total: 3 km^{2} (1.2 sq mi)

Population (2011)
  - Total: 2,044
  - Density: 684/km^{2} (1,770/sq mi)

Languages
  - Official: Telugu
- Time zone: UTC+5:30 (IST)
- Postal code: 533 446

Yentrikona is a village in Allavaram Mandal, Dr. B.R. Ambedkar Konaseema district in the state of Andhra Pradesh in India.

== Demographics ==
As of 2011 India census, Yentrikona had a population of 2044, out of which 1029 were male and 1015 were female. The population of children below 6 years of age was 11%. The literacy rate of the village was 76%.
