= Ryali =

- Village
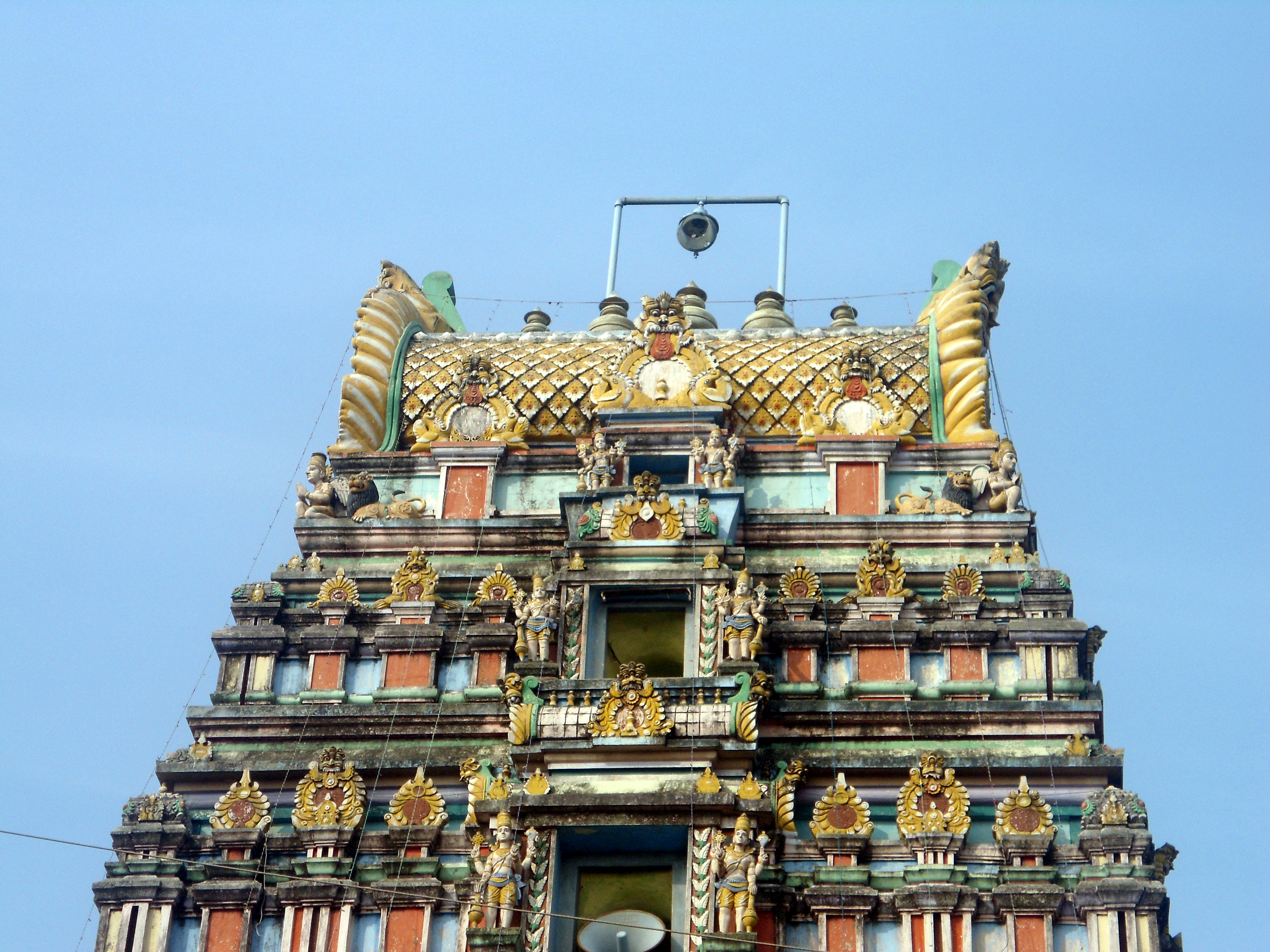
- Gopuram at Ryali Temple
- Interactive map of Ryali
- Location in Andhra Pradesh, India Ryali (India)
- Coordinates: 16.775863°N 81.808147°E
- Country: India
- State: Andhra Pradesh
- District: Dr. B.R. Ambedkar Konaseema

Area
  - Total: 9.50 km^{2} (3.67 sq mi)

Population (2011)
  - Total: 13,123
  - Density: 1,380/km^{2} (3,580/sq mi)

Languages
  - Official: Telugu
- Time zone: UTC+5:30 (IST)
- PIN: 533236
- Telephone code: 08855
- Vehicle registration: AP 05

Ryali is a village in Dr. B.R. Ambedkar Konaseema district of the Indian state of Andhra Pradesh. It is located in Atreyapuram Mandal of Amalapuram revenue division. It is a tourist spot due to the famous Jagan Mohini Keshava Swami temple as well was the nearby Vadapalle temple.

== Culture ==
Jagan Mohini Kesava temple - the notable idol, made of black stone and depicting Maha Vishnu and Mohini on its front and rear sides respectively, is considered to be an example of sculptural dexterity. The idol has exquisite carvings and scriptures which makes it even more mesmerising. The village also has Uma Kamandaleswara Swamy temple. The idols of both the deities face each other. Every year, the village goddess' (grama devata) fest takes place in the month of April or May in the Hindu month of Chaitra.
