= Merlapalem =

- Interactive map of Merlapalem
- Location in Andhra Pradesh, India Merlapalem (India)
- Coordinates: 16°47′49″N 81°48′55″E
- Country: India
- State: Andhra Pradesh
- District: Dr. B.R. Ambedkar Konaseema
- Talukas: Merlapalem

Area
  - Total: 6.73 km^{2} (2.60 sq mi)

Population (2011)
  - Total: 4,060
  - Density: 603/km^{2} (1,560/sq mi)

Languages
- Time zone: UTC+5:30 (IST)
- PIN: 533237

Merlapalem is a village in Dr. B.R. Ambedkar Konaseema district of the Indian state of Andhra Pradesh. It is located in Atreyapuram Mandal of Amalapuram revenue division.
