= Godi, Allavaram Mandal =

Godi
- village
- Interactive map of Godi
- Location in Andhra Pradesh, India Godi (India)
- Coordinates: 16.4894°N 81.9719°E
- Country: India
- State: Andhra Pradesh
- District: Dr. B.R. Ambedkar Konaseema

Area
  - Total: 5 km^{2} (1.9 sq mi)

Population (2011)
  - Total: 4,723
  - Density: 990/km^{2} (2,600/sq mi)

Languages
  - Official: Telugu
- Time zone: UTC+5:30 (IST)
- Postal code: 533 446

Godi is a village in Allavaram Mandal, Dr. B.R. Ambedkar Konaseema district in the state of Andhra Pradesh in India.

== Demographics ==
As of 2011 India census, Godi had a population of 4723, out of which 2130 were male and 2593 were female. The population of children below 6 years of age was 8%. The literacy rate of the village was 78%.
