= Ramarajulanka =

- city
- Interactive map of Ramarajulanka
- Country: India
- State: Andhra Pradesh
- District: Konaseema

Languages
  - Official: Telugu
- Time zone: UTC+5:30 (IST)
- PIN: 533253
- Telephone code: 08862

Ramarajulanka is a village located in Konaseema district in Andhra Pradesh, India.

A Ramalayam is in the center of the village, as well as a goddess Muthyalamma. In nearby Chinchinada there is a very well constructed bridge connecting West & East Godavari districts. The Ramarajulanka pin code is 533253.

There is a temple on each road in Ramarajulanka, and the village has many coconut trees and paddy fields. Lord Subrahmanyeshwara temple is a famous attraction in the region. There are many tourist attractions around the village, including the famous SHIVALAYAM (parvathi rama lingeshwara swamy temple). An 18 ft. Hanuman idol is located in a farming area, which is one of the main attractions of the village.

== Population Data ==
	Rural
Households	1,687
Total Population	7,323
Male Population	3,171
Female Population	3,152
Youngsters Under Age of 6 Yrs	730
Boys Under 6 Yrs	379
Girls Under 6 Yrs	351
Total Literates	4,554
Total Illiterates	1,769
