= Allavaram mandal =

- Mandal
- Interactive map of Allavaram mandal
- Country: India
- State: Andhra Pradesh
- District: Konaseema district

Area
  - Total: 104.92 km^{2} (40.51 sq mi)

Population (2011)
  - Total: 68,242
- Time zone: UTC+5:30 (IST)

Allavaram mandal is one of the 22 mandals in Konaseema district of Andhra Pradesh. As per census 2011, there are 14 villages in this mandal.

== Demographics ==
Allavaram mandal has total population of 68,242 (as of 2011 census) out of which 34,034 are males while 34,208 are females. The average sex ratio is 965. The total literacy rate of is 78%. As of 2024, the total population is 91,444.

== Villages ==
=== Villages ===
1. Allavaram
2. Bendamurulanka
3. Bodasakurru
4. Devaguptam
5. Godi
6. Godilanka
7. Gudala
8. Komaragiripatnam
9. Mogallamuru
10. Odalarevu
11. Rellugadda
12. Samanthakuru
13. Tadikona
14. Thurupulanka
15. Yentrikona

== See also ==
- List of mandals in Andhra Pradesh
