= Devarapalle, Ravulapalem Mandal =

Devarapalle
- village
- Interactive map of Devarapalle
- Location in Andhra Pradesh, India Devarapalle (India)
- Coordinates: 16.7203°N 81.8640°E
- Country: India
- State: Andhra Pradesh
- District: Dr. B.R. Ambedkar Konaseema

Area
  - Total: 8 km^{2} (3.1 sq mi)

Population (2011)
  - Total: 8,293
  - Density: 1,002/km^{2} (2,600/sq mi)

Languages
  - Official: Telugu
- Time zone: UTC+5:30 (IST)
- Postal code: 533 446

Devarapalle is a village in Ravulapalem Mandal, Dr. B.R. Ambedkar Konaseema district in the state of Andhra Pradesh in India.

== Geography ==
Devarapalle is located at 16.7203°N 81.8640°E.

== Demographics ==
As of 2011 India census, Devarapalle had a population of 8,293, out of which 4,242 were male and 4,051 were female. The population of children below 6 years of age was 10%. The literacy rate of the village was 72%.
