= Mogallamuru =

- village
- Interactive map of Mogallamuru
- Location in Andhra Pradesh, India Mogallamuru (India)
- Coordinates: 16.4757°N 81.9860°E
- Country: India
- State: Andhra Pradesh
- District: Dr. B.R. Ambedkar Konaseema

Area
  - Total: 7 km^{2} (2.7 sq mi)

Population (2011)
  - Total: 2,741
  - Density: 714/km^{2} (1,850/sq mi)

Languages
  - Official: Telugu
- Time zone: UTC+5:30 (IST)
- Postal code: 533 446

Mogallamuru is a village in Allavaram Mandal, Dr. B.R. Ambedkar Konaseema district in the state of Andhra Pradesh in India.

== Demographics ==
As of 2011 India census, Mogallamuru had a population of 2741, out of which 1379 were male and 1362 were female. The population of children below 6 years of age was 10%. The literacy rate of the village was 78%.
