= Vasanthawada =

- village
- Interactive map of Vasanthawada
- Location in Andhra Pradesh, India Vasanthawada (India)
- Coordinates: 16.8378°N 81.7715°E
- Country: India
- State: Andhra Pradesh
- District: Dr. B.R. Ambedkar Konaseema

Area
  - Total: 3 km^{2} (1.2 sq mi)

Population (2011)
  - Total: 2,044
  - Density: 691/km^{2} (1,790/sq mi)

Languages
  - Official: Telugu
- Time zone: UTC+5:30 (IST)
- Postal code: 533 446

Vasanthawada is a village in Atreyapuram Mandal, Dr. B.R. Ambedkar Konaseema district (or East Godavari District) in the state of Andhra Pradesh in India.

== Geography ==
Vasanthawada is located at 16.8378°N 81.7715°E.

== Demographics ==
As of 2011 India census, Vasanthawada had a population of 2044, out of which 1043 were male and 1001 were female. The population of children below 6 years of age was 8%. The literacy rate of the village was 70%.
