= Devarapalli Prakash Rao =

Indian social worker (1958–2021)

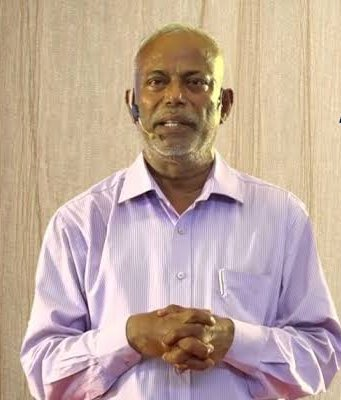
- Born: Devarapalli Prakash Rao; 11 November 1958; Cuttack, India
- Died: 13 January 2021 (aged 62); Cuttack, India
- Known for: Social Worker
- Spouse: Vijayalakshmi
- Children: 2
- Awards: Padma Shri (2014)

Devarapalli Prakash Rao (known as D Prakash Rao) (11 November 1958 – 13 January 2021) was an Indian social worker from Odisha. He was awarded the Padma Shri by the then president on the occasion of India's Commonwealth Day in 2014 for the provision of education and blood donation for the poor and orphaned children living in various slums in Cuttack. He owned a tea shop.

== Early life ==
De Prakash Rao was born on 11 November 1958, in Cuttack. His father's name was D Krishnamurthy and he was a soldier in the British Army. His mother's name was De Lakshmi. His wife, Vijayalakshmi works as a nurse at Sri Ramchandra Bhanj College of Medicine. The Rao couple has two daughters named Haripriya and Vanupriya.

== Social work ==
Rao founded a school called Asha O Ashwasana. He started the school after seeing young children in local slums deprived of education and abstaining from alcohol and petty crimes. He arranged for children from first to third grade to be taught there. Currently, there are 80 students studying there. He spent half of his income from the tea shop on running the school. He has donated blood 214 times. He also decided to donate his body after his death.

== Death ==
Rao died on 13 January 2021, while undergoing treatment at the Cuttack General Hospital. He tested positive for COVID-19 in December.

== Awards and honors ==
- Padma Shri (2014)
- Human Rights Award (2016)
- Annie Besant Award (2015)
