= Muramalla =

Village in India

The village Muramalla is a major panchayat located in the I. Polavaram Mandal of the Konaseema district of Andhra Pradesh.

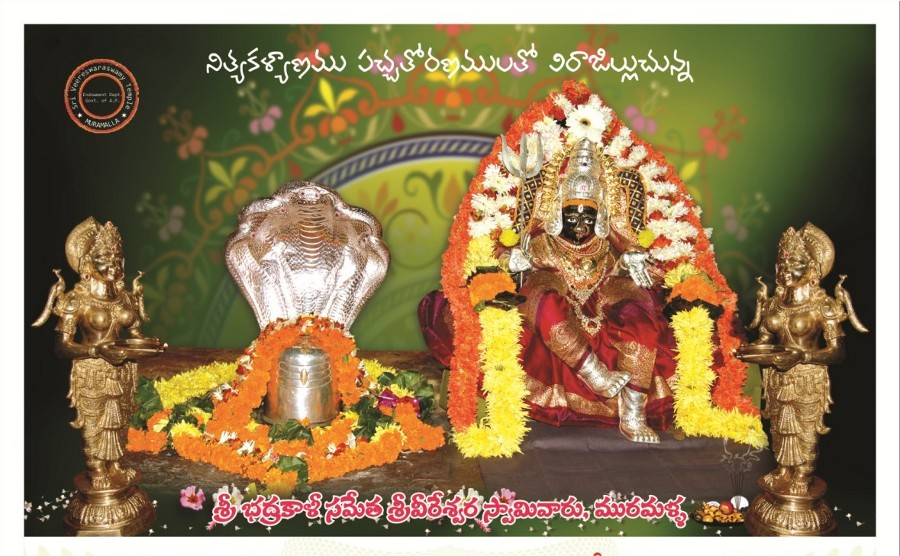
vereswaraswamy temple
