= Bendamurulanka =

- village
- Interactive map of Bendamurulanka
- Location in Andhra Pradesh, India Bendamurulanka (India)
- Coordinates: 16.5856°N 81.9690°E
- Country: India
- State: Andhra Pradesh
- District: Dr. B.R. Ambedkar Konaseema

Area
  - Total: 14 km^{2} (5.4 sq mi)

Population (2011)
  - Total: 8,576
  - Density: 611/km^{2} (1,580/sq mi)

Languages
  - Official: Telugu
- Time zone: UTC+5:30 (IST)
- Postal code: 533 446

Bendamurulanka is a village in Allavaram Mandal, Dr. B.R. Ambedkar Konaseema district in the state of Andhra Pradesh in India.

== Demographics ==
As of 2011 India census, Bendamurulanka had a population of 8576, out of which 4278 were male and 4298 were female. The population of children below 6 years of age was 10%. The literacy rate of the village was 78%.
