= Atreyapuram =

Atreyapuram Atrey
- Village
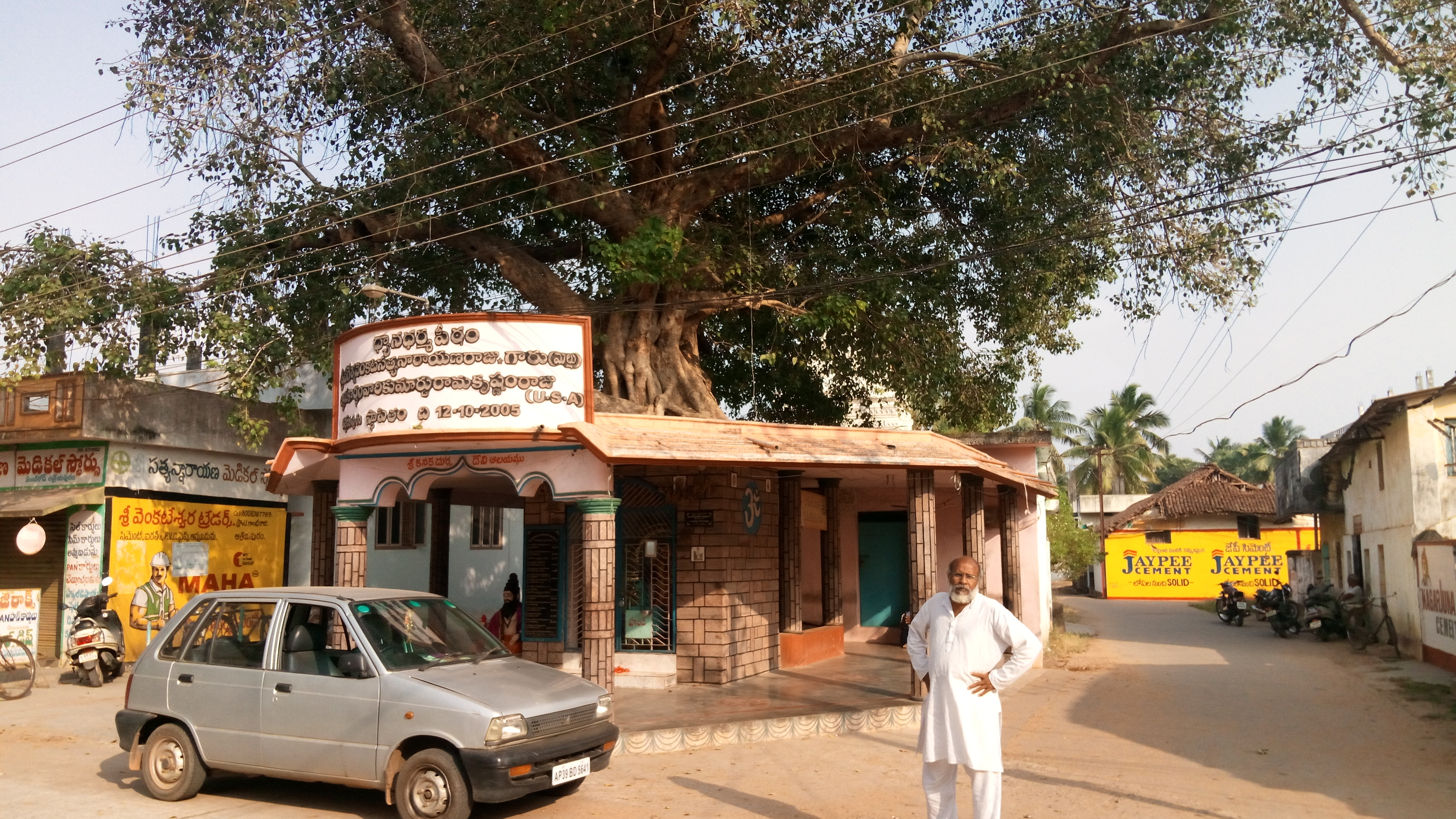
- Center of Atreyapuram
- Interactive map of Atreyapuram
- Location in Andhra Pradesh, India Atreyapuram (India)
- Coordinates: 16°50′2.97″N 81°47′12.85″E
- Country: India
- State: Andhra Pradesh
- District: Dr. B.R. Ambedkar Konaseema
- Mandal: Atreyapuram

Area
  - Total: 5.67 km^{2} (2.19 sq mi)

Languages
  - Official: Telugu
- Time zone: UTC+5:30 (IST)
- PIN: 533235
- Telephone code: 08855
- Vehicle Registration: AP05 (Former); AP39 (from 30 January 2019)

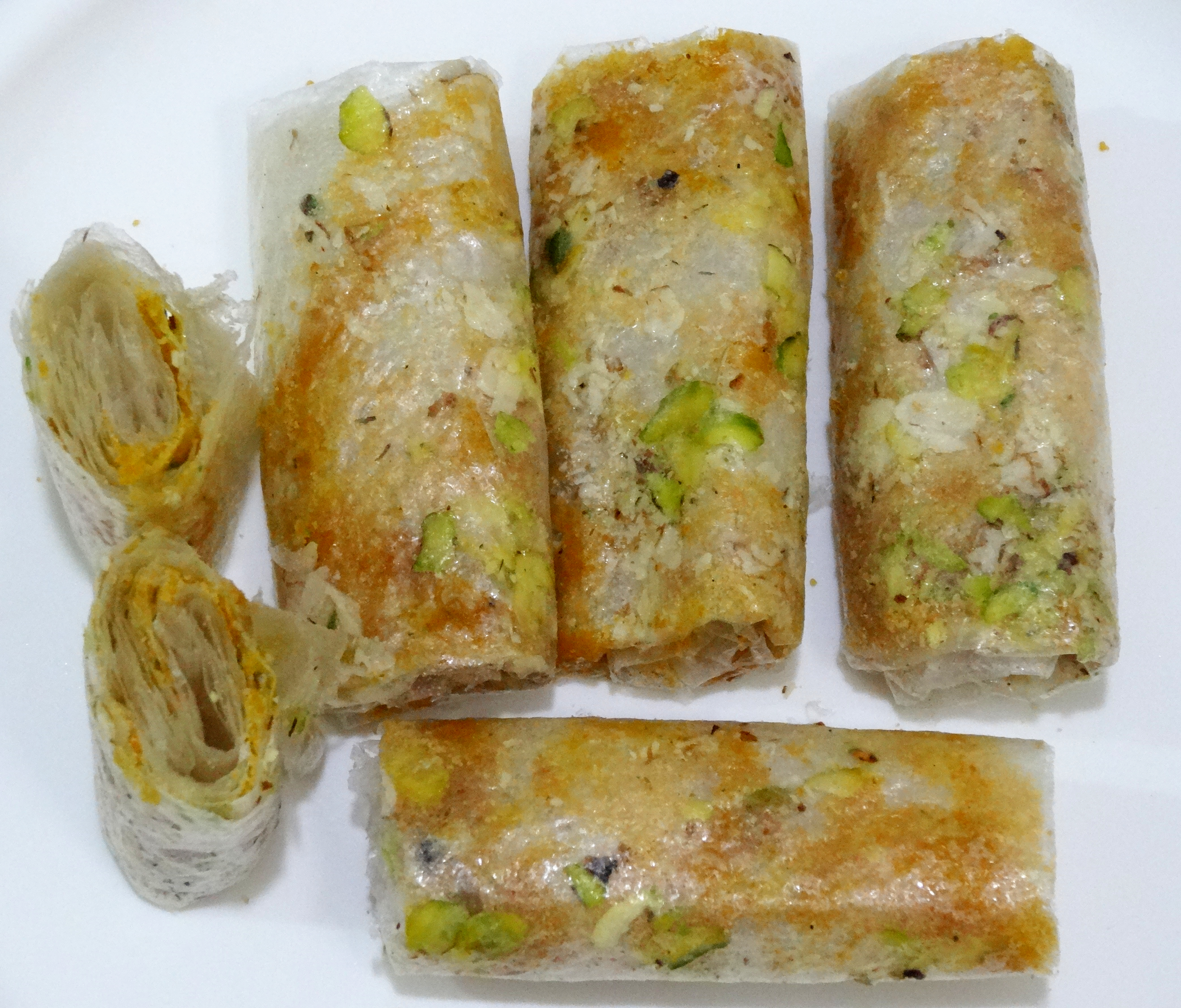
Pootharekulu

Atreyapuram is a village in Konaseema district of Indian state of Andhra Pradesh. It is located in Atreyapuram Mandal of Amalapuram revenue division of the district.

== Popularity ==
The village is known for the popular Indian sweet pootharekulu.
