= Vadapalle =

- Village
- Interactive map of Vadapalle
- Location in Andhra Pradesh, India Vadapalle (India)
- Coordinates: 16.818673°N 81.812044°E
- Country: India
- State: Andhra Pradesh
- District: Dr. B.R. Ambedkar Konaseema (Near Rajamahendravaram)

Government
  - Type: Local Body
  - Body: Panchayat

Area
  - Total: 2.91 km^{2} (1.12 sq mi)

Population (2011)
  - Total: 2,481
  - Density: 853/km^{2} (2,210/sq mi)

Languages
  - Official: Telugu
- Time zone: UTC+5:30 (IST)
- PIN: 533237

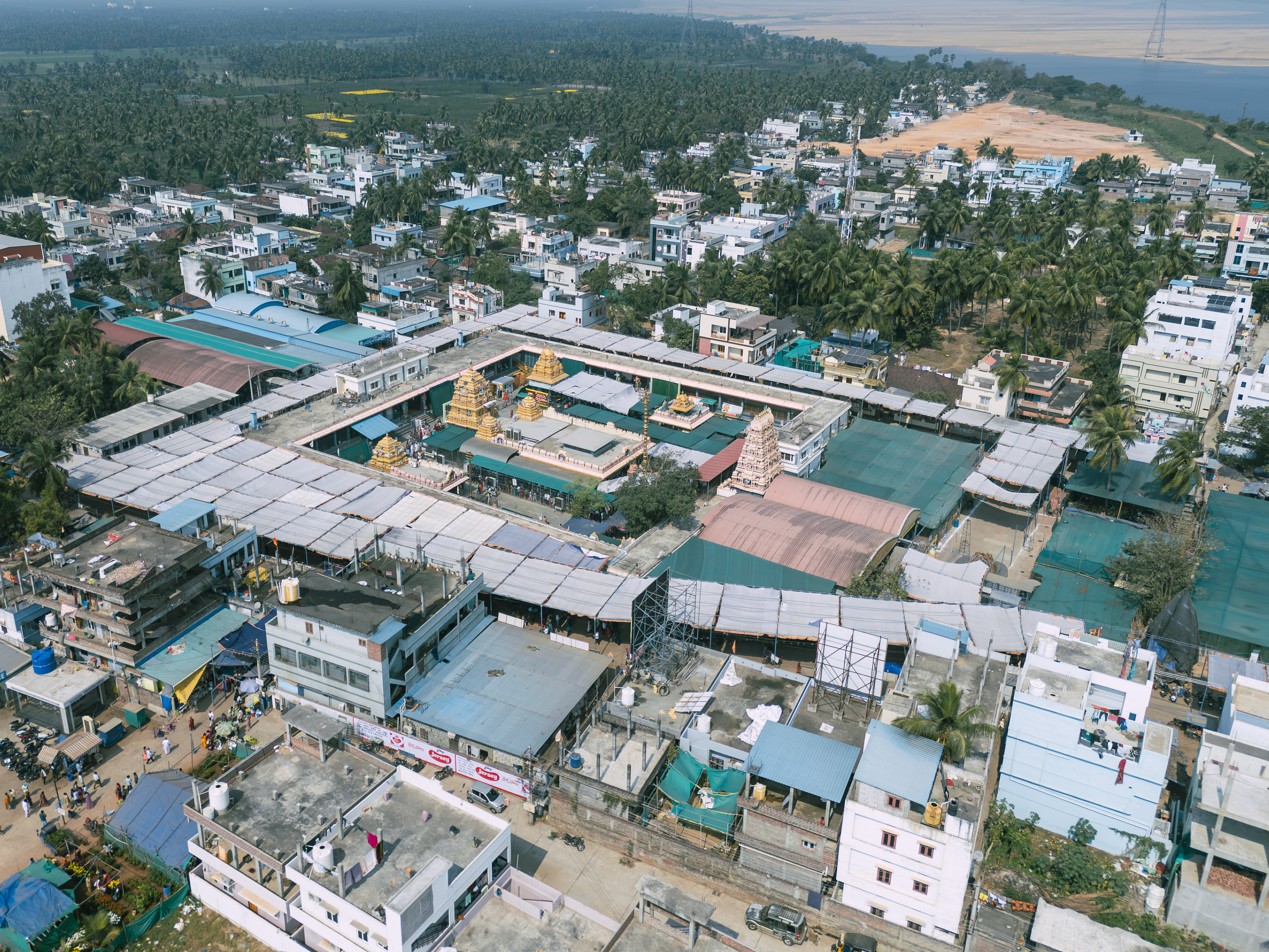
Vadapalli Temple Aerial View

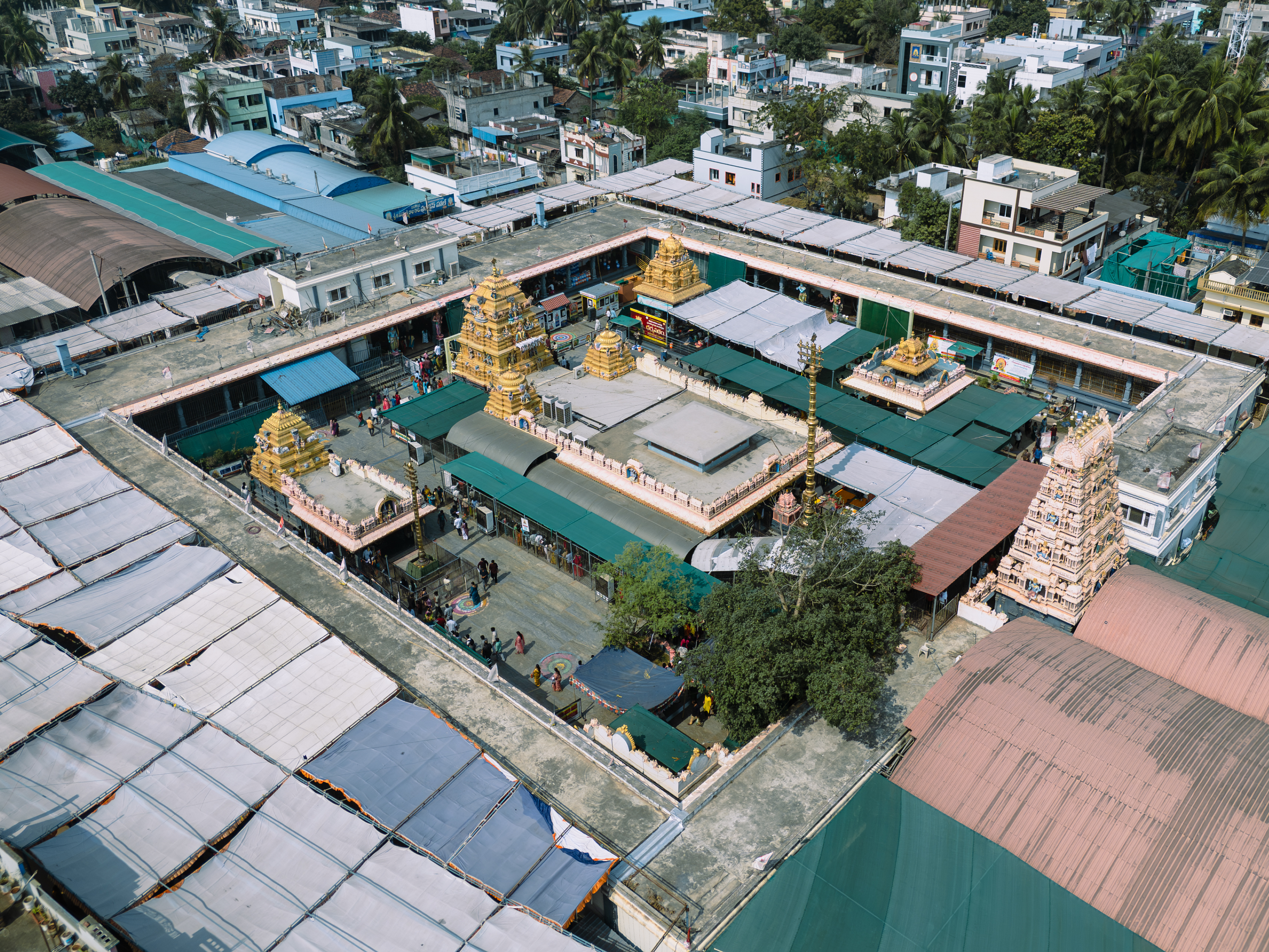
Vadapalli Temple

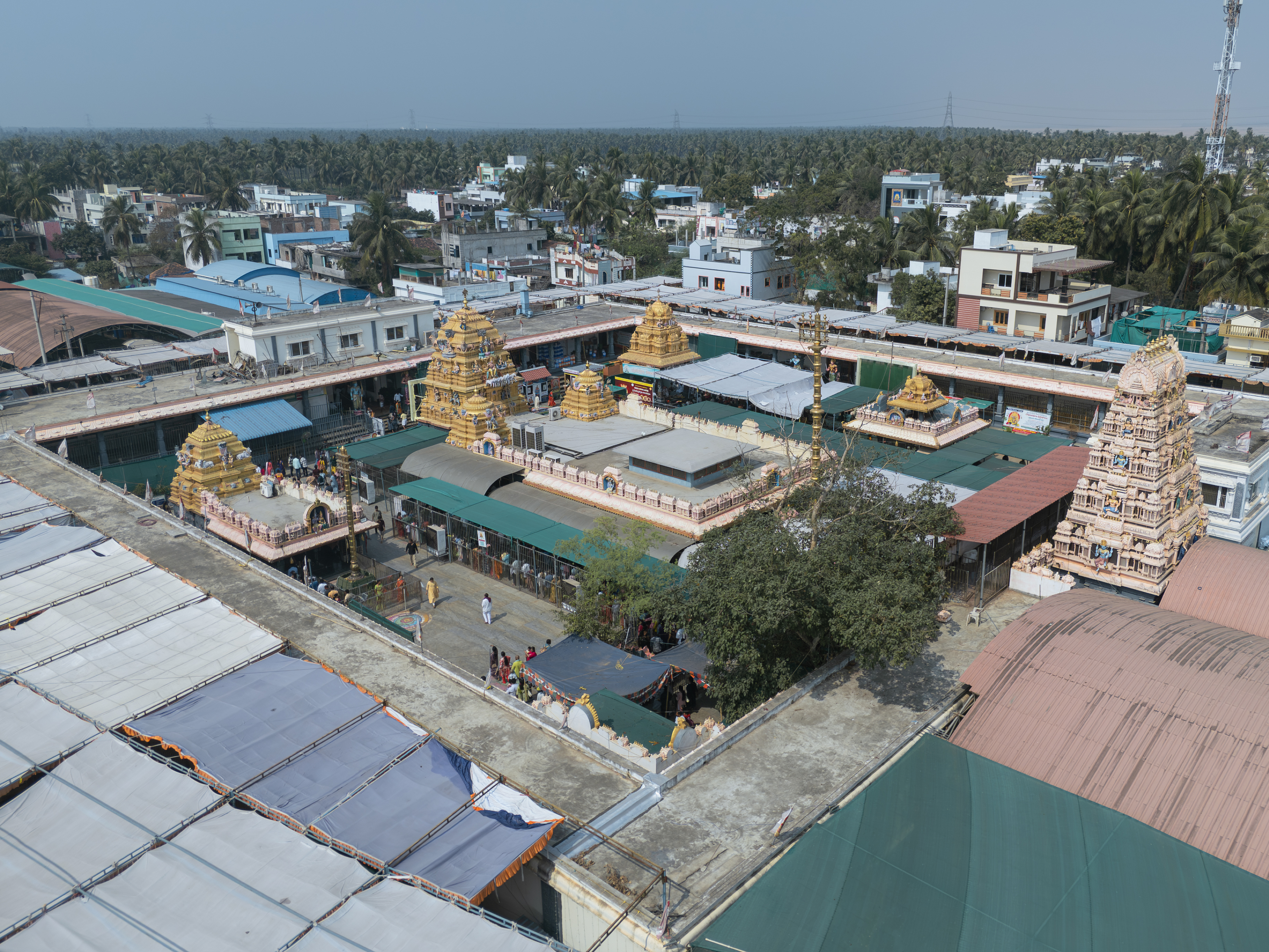
Venkateswara Swamy Temple, Vadapalle

Vadapalle is a village in Dr. B.R. Ambedkar Konaseema district of the Indian state of Andhra Pradesh. It is located in Atreyapuram Mandal of Ravulapalem revenue division. This village is famous for its temple with presiding deity Sri Venkateswara Swamy (also known as Yedu Sanivaramulu Venkanna). Every year lakhs of devotes visiting the temple from different states of India.

Pinapotu Gajendrudu built the Vadapalle Sri Venkateswara Swamy temple in 1759. He donated acres of land and ornaments to the temple.

== Civil Disobedience Movement (1930) ==
The following residents of East Godavari district, Andhra Pradesh took part in the Civil Disobedience Movement (1930). On the occasion of the Sri Venkateswara Swami Rathotsavam at Vadapalli, on 30 March 1931, along with the deity, a Tricolour flag and photos of Mahatma Gandhi, and some other national leaders adorned the car. This was objected by the Government officials, and when the procession was about to start, the Sub-Inspector of Razolu removed the portraits of the national leaders. People resented the act and refused to draw the chariot without the portraits. Over this issue, a riot broke out at Chinnavadapalli. Police arrested some people and lathi-charged others and the crowd retaliated by throwing stones and mud on the police. Police retaliated by indiscriminately firing on the crowd. Bandaru Narayanaswamy, Tatapati Venkataraju and Vadapalli Gangachalam died due to gunshot wounds.

== Transport ==
Road

Vadapalle can be accessed by road Amalapuram Bobbarlanka road via Ravulapalem. Bus Transit is the major mode of passenger transport for the Devotees. APSRTC Buses are available from Rajamahendravaram bus station, Kotipalli bus stand, Gokavaram bus stand and Bobbaralanka bus stand. Many devotees can also access buses from Rajahmundry railway station main gate especially on Saturdays

Rail

The nearest railway station is at Rajamahendravaram, about 27 kilometres (17 mi) from Vadapalle. Rajahmundry railway station is one of the major railway stations in the South Coast Railway zone zone of the Indian Railways, providing rail connectivity to major parts of India. It is under the jurisdiction of Vijayawada railway division..

Airport

The nearest airport is Rajahmundry Airport, about 50 kilometres (31 mi) from Vadapalli. It is a domestic airport with direct flights to Hyderabad, Tirupathi, Bengaluru, Chennai, Delhi and Mumbai.
