= Allavaram =

- Village
- Interactive map of Allavaram
- Location in Andhra Pradesh, India
- Coordinates: 16.517071°N 81.988491°E
- Country: India
- State: Andhra Pradesh
- District: Dr. B.R. Ambedkar Konaseema
- Talukas: Allavaram

Area
  - Total: 10.63 km^{2} (4.10 sq mi)

Population (2011)
  - Total: 9,993
  - Density: 940.1/km^{2} (2,435/sq mi)

Languages
  - Official: Telugu
- Time zone: UTC+5:30 (IST)
- Telephone code: 08856
- Vehicle Registration: AP05 (Former); AP39 (from 30 January 2019)

Allavaram is a village in Allavaram mandal, Konaseema district in the state of Andhra Pradesh in India which comes under Amalapuram revenue division.

== Geography and economy ==
Allavaram mandal, part of Dr. B. R. Ambedkar Konaseema district, lies along the Godavari delta coast on the Bay of Bengal. Several villages under the mandal, including Odalarevu, Dummalapeta and Komaragiripatnam, are fishing communities whose boats operate out of the Odalarevu Fish Landing Centre, one of the main deep-sea fishing harbours on this stretch of the Andhra Pradesh coast.

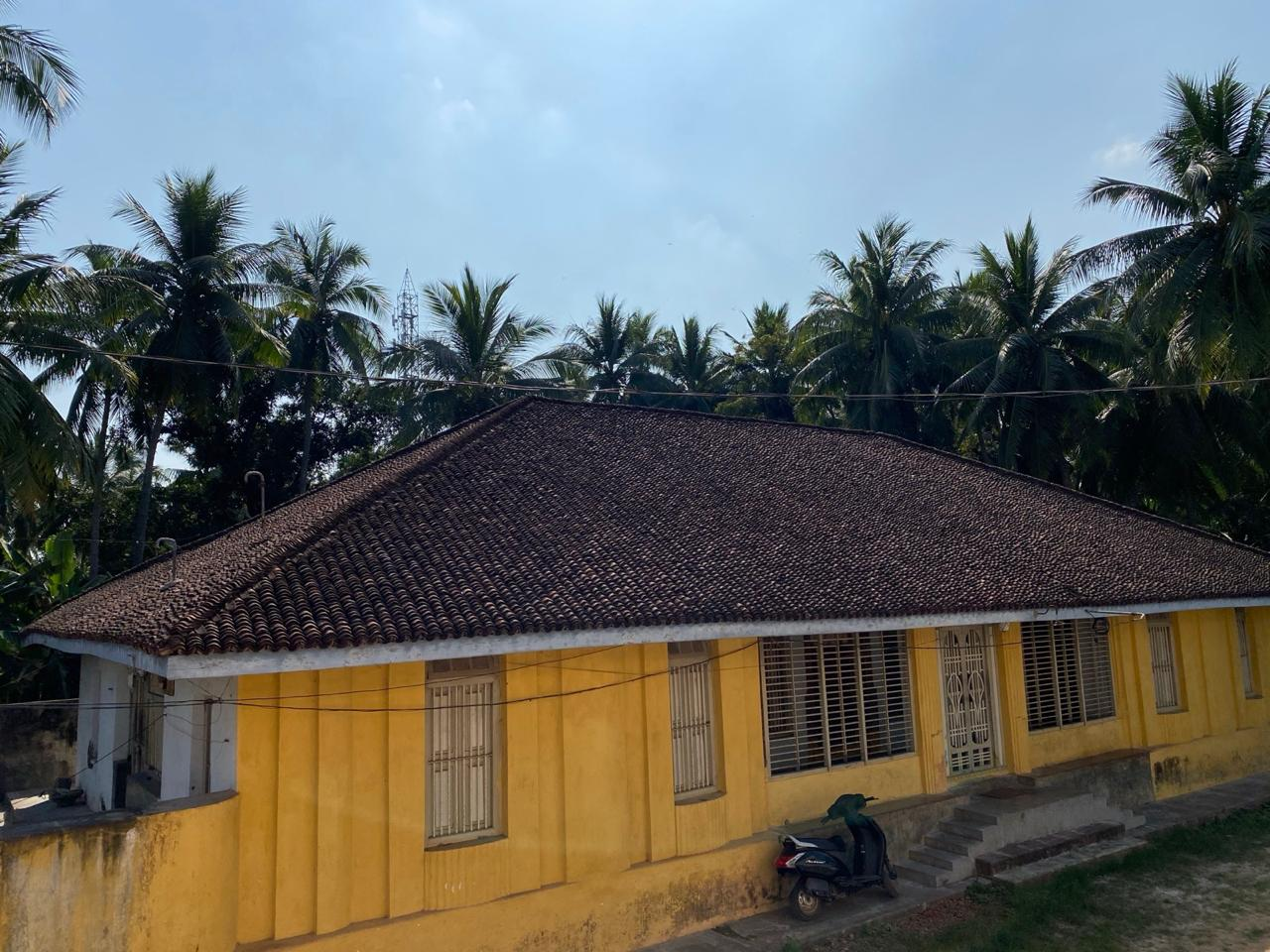
A traditional house in Allavaram, Konaseema district

In August 2026, a fishing boat carrying eight fishermen from Odalarevu, Dummalapeta and Vasalathippa villages in Allavaram mandal went missing in the Bay of Bengal after setting out from the Odalarevu jetty on 3 August. When the boat failed to return by its scheduled date, the Indian Coast Guard and Indian Navy launched a large-scale search operation, deploying vessels, aircraft and a helicopter, in coordination with the district administration; Andhra Pradesh Chief Minister N. Chandrababu Naidu directed officials to intensify the search.

== Demographics ==
In August 2026, a fishing boat carrying eight fishermen from Odalarevu, Dummalapeta and Vasalathippa villages in Allavaram mandal went missing in the Bay of Bengal after setting out from the Odalarevu jetty on 3 August. When the boat failed to return by its scheduled date, the Indian Coast Guard and Indian Navy launched a large-scale search operation, deploying vessels, aircraft and a helicopter, in coordination with the district administration; Andhra Pradesh Chief Minister N. Chandrababu Naidu directed officials to intensify the search.
