= Amalapuram revenue division =

Coordinates: 15°54′N 80°40′E

- revenue division in Konaseema district
- Interactive map of Amalapuram revenue division
- Country: India
- State: Andhra Pradesh
- District: Dr. B.R. Ambedkar Konaseema

Amalapuram revenue division (or Amalapuram division) is an administrative division in the Dr. B.R. Ambedkar Konaseema district of the Indian state of Andhra Pradesh. It is one of the three revenue divisions in the district which consists of ten mandals under its administration. Amalapuram is the divisional headquarters.

== Administration ==
There are 10 mandals in Amalapuram revenue division.

No.	Mandals
1	Allavaram
2	Amalapuram
3	I. Polavaram
4	Katrenikona
5	Malikipuram
6	Mamidikuduru
7	Mummidivaram
8	Razole
9	Sakhinetipalle mandal
10	Uppalaguptam

== See also ==
- List of revenue divisions in Andhra Pradesh
- List of mandals in Andhra Pradesh
