= Khandavalli Lakshmi Ranjanam =

Indian writer (1908–1986)

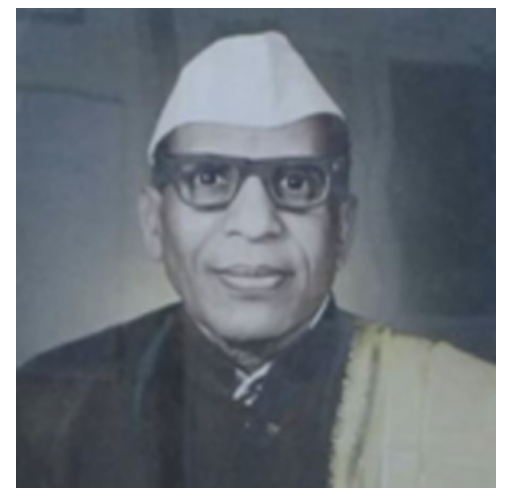
- Born: 1 March 1908; Ganti Pedapudi, Madras Presidency
- Died: 18 May 1986 (aged 78); Hyderabad, Telangana
- Education: M.A.
- Alma mater: Madras University
- Spouse: Khandavalli Bhramaramba (née Korada)
- Relatives: Khandavalli Suryanarayana (father); Khandavalli Seetamma (née Korada; mother); Khandavalli Balendu Sekharam; Korada Ramachandra Sastri; Korada Ramakrishnaiya; Korada Mahadeva Sastri; Korada Subrahmanyam; Mahidhara Nalinimohan; Mahidhara Rammohan Rao
- Writing career
- Notable work: Sangrahandhra Vignanakosam

Khandavalli Lakshmi Ranjanam (1 March 1908 – 18 June 1986) is doyen of Telugu literature and research from Andhra Pradesh, India.

He was born in Ganti Pedapudi village, (East Godavari, Andhra Pradesh) of the erstwhile Madras Presidency on 1 March 1908.His ancestral native was Bellampudi, 3 miles from P.Gannavaram. He lost his father early in life and bore the burden of the family. He passed B.A. in first class and M.A. in Telugu and Sanskrit from Madras University. He came to Hyderabad in 1928 and joined as a teacher in a Government school.

Osmania University, though established long ago, did not have a seat in Telugu subject. Rayaprolu Subbarao joined as lecturer in Telugu. Lakshmiranjanam joined under him as junior lecturer. They persuaded the university authorities to open Telugu classes in the constituent colleges. He was elevated to lecturer and head of the department in 1945 and Professor in 1952.

Having established the Telugu department strongly, he turned his efforts to establish a Research wing in Telugu language. The first Ph.D. degree in Telugu from the university was achieved by Dr. B.Rama Raju. He edited some parvas of Tikkana Mahabharatam for Sahitya Academy. His major work is Sangrahandhra Vignanakosam - Encyclopedia in 8 volumes. Between 1912 and 1938 Komarraju Venkata Lakshmana Rao and Kasinadhuni Nageswara Rao compiled Encyclopedia of Telugu - Andhra Vignana Sarvaswam. They could bring 3 volumes. After that Urlam Zamindar Prasadaraya Bahadur with the help of scholars published 7 volumes. Lakshmirajyam with strong determination edited and published 8 volumes of Sangrahandhra Vignana Kosam. He published Andhra History and geographical facts of Andhra Pradesh.

He established Vivekananda Educational Society and started a high school for boys and girls. He started Andhra Oriental Sanskrit and Telugu College at Nallakunta in 1958. This college grew to a Postgraduate Centre and celebrating its Golden jubilee in 2008.
