= Korada Subrahmanyam =

Sanskrit scholar (born 1954)

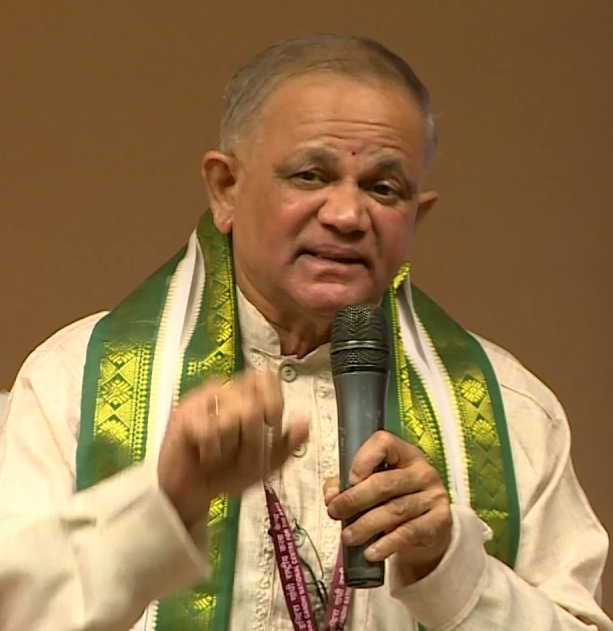
- Born: Munganda (P. Gannavaram), East Godavari, Andhra Pradesh
- Education: Andhra University
- Organization(s): IIT Hyderabad & University of Hyderabad
- Known for: Sanskrit, Philosophy and Linguistics
- Notable work: Mahavakyavicarah; Vakyapadiyam; Four Vrttis in Panini; Theories of Language : Oriental and Occidental; Pramanas in Indian Philosophy
- Relatives: Jagannatha Panditaraja; Khandavalli Lakshmi Ranjanam; Korada Ramachandra Sastri; Korada Ramakrishnaiya; Korada Mahadeva Sastri

Korada Subrahmanyam (born 1954) is an Indian Sanskrit grammarian and scholar. He served as a Professor of Sanskrit at the University of Hyderabad, where he was associated with the Centre for Applied Linguistics and Translation Studies (CALTS). Following his retirement, he served as an Adjunct Professor at the IIT Hyderabad.

== Early life and education ==
Korada was born into a family of Vedic scholars hailing from the Godavari delta region, known as Konaseema. PrSubrahmanyam was introduced to Sanskrit by his father Korada Subbavadhani(1913–1985), a ghanapāṭhī and Sanskrit scholar himself.

He memorized Amarakosha, a Sanskrit thesaurus at age five. After mastering Krishna Yajurveda and the Upanishads, he went on to study Vyākaraṇa under Sripada Lakshminarayana Sastry(Podagatlapalli, East Godavari) and Kompella Subbaraya Sastry(Narendrapuram, East Godavari) in a traditional manner. Korada also gained proficiency in Vedanta under the tutelage of Rani Narasimha Sastry(Narendrapuram EG Dist.) and Acarya Pullela Sriramacandrudu (Hyderabad) and Jyotisham under Chivukula Satyanarayana Murthy (Gopalapuram, EG Dist.). He also forayed into Mīmāṃsā, Nyāya, Vaiśeṣika, Yoga, Sānkhya, Sāmudrika, and Tantra gaining expertise through self-learning and interaction with scholars. He is a rare phenomenon, who had his schooling in both Oriental (Gurukula) and Occidental (University) fashions. Post bachelor's, Korada pursued his Master's and Ph.D. in Sanskrit from Andhra University, Visakhapatnam. His Ph.D. dissertation titled Mahāvākyavicārah ( A Study of Discourse ) is considered to be a magnum opus in the field of Sanskrit Linguistics.

== Career ==
He has contributed hundreds of posts to the Google group 'Bharatiya Vidvat Parishad' over the past few years, which are also published in his blog named "Koradeeyam".

Korada joined the University of Hyderabad as a faculty and retired in 2019 as a Professor. During his 31-year-long tenure, around 30 students worked with him for their MPhil and Ph.D. degrees.

His areas of specialization include Paninian Grammar, Philosophy of Language, Translation, Vedas, Vedangas and Upanishads. He is also well versed in Mahābhāṣya, Vākyapadīya, Laghumañjūṣā, ślokavārtikam and Tantravārtikam. He studied Astadasavidyasthanams, ie Vedas, Vedangas, Darsanas, Upavedas, and Puranas (Lectures are available on Youtube and Essays are available on ancient indianwisdom.com of Jijyasa Foundation, USA.

== Awards ==
He is the recipient of "Vedavyasa Sammanam", an honor bestowed upon scholars with expertise in Vedic studies and related fields.

== Research and publications ==
Some of his published books include (available on archive.com ):

- Mahavakyavicarah (Ph.D. dissertation) - deals with the Study of Discourse in different systems of Indian Philosophy
- Vakyapadiyam (Brahmakanda only - English Translation) - explicates the cryptic meaning of Bhartrhari
- Four Vrttis in Panini - is an elaborated study of Vrttis in Paniniya with the help of various commentaries
- Theories of Language: Oriental and Occidental – is a nutshell of ancient and modern linguistic theories
- Pramanas in Indian Philosophy - offers a panorama of Pramanas right from Vedas and Epics
