= Munganda =

Munganda Munikhanda Agraharam
- Village
- Interactive map of Munganda
- Location in Andhra Pradesh, India Munganda (India)
- Coordinates: 16.5982°N 81.9187°E
- Country: India
- State: Andhra Pradesh
- District: Konaseema
- MuniKhanda: 16th century

Area
  - Total: 5.39 km^{2} (2.08 sq mi)

Population (2011)
  - Total: 5,297
  - Density: 983/km^{2} (2,550/sq mi)

Languages
  - Official: Telugu
- Time zone: UTC+5:30 (IST)

Munganda is a village in Konaseema district of the Indian state of Andhra Pradesh. It is located in the P.Gannavaram mandal of Amalapuram revenue division and is part of Konaseema.

== History ==
The village dates back to the early 16th century and is an Agraharam. It is bounded by the Vasishta and Vainateya rivers to the west and Kowsika and Sankhyayana rivers to the east, all of which are tributaries of the Godavari River. There is a tank near the village on the bund of which there were several raavi (ficus religiosa) trees. It is believed that sages in the past spent their time in peaceful penance under these trees. Therefore, the place was called Munikhanda Agraharam (place or plot of land of sages). Munganda is a corrupted form of the name. Originally, there were three villages, Bhanavipuram, Khandrika, and Agraharam, which formed part of Peddapuram Samsthanam and which were gifted away to men of learning. Subsequently, they were combined into one village under the name Munganda.

The Agraharam had a major concentration of Telugu Brahmin families belonging to the Vaidiki Veginadu subject, although the numbers have declined over time due to migration.

== Contribution to independence movement ==
The village was always at the forefront during the Khadi movement when hundreds of spinning wheels and handlooms produced both rough and quality khadi during the days of the Swadesi Swarajya movements. Many individuals from this village took an active part in the freedom movement and had been jailed on many occasions.

== Temples and worship ==
The temples of Muleswara Swamy, Rajeswara Swamy, Venugopala Swamy, Mutyalamma, and a Ganapati Mandiram are the places of worship in the village. Ganapathi Navarathrulu is celebrated for nine days from Bhadrapada Suddha Chavithi (August–September). Sahasranamarchanas (repeating a thousand names of the Lord), recitation from Vedas, reading of Puranams and philosophical discussions are held. This festival is being celebrated for the past 120 years but is confined to this place only.

== Notable individuals ==
The place has been noted for great intellectuals that had made a name in several branches of Sanskrit learning viz., jyotishya, purana, nyaya, mimamsa, vyakarana, and dharma sastras.

Well-known 17th century Sanskrit poet and critic Upadrasta Jagannatha Panditaraja (1590-1670) had his roots in Munganda.

Nadiminti Rukmeswara Sastry and Nadiminti Sarvamangaleswara Sastry (1759-1839) created four simplified Sanskrit grammar manuals – Sabda Manjari (శబ్ద మంజరి), Samaasa Kusumaavali (సమాస కుసుమావళి), Vibhakti Vilaasamu (విభక్తి విలాసము) and Ramayana Sangraham (రామాయణ సంగ్రహం), which stand as the most sought after textbooks by Sanskrit students even today (https://www.sakshi.com/news/family/nadiminti-sarvamangal-leswara-sastry-telugu-poet-1040188)
Vijayendra Saraswati Swamigal, the 70th Jagadguru of Kanchi Kamakoti Peetham, Kanchipuram belongs to the Mukkamala family of Munganda
Korada Ramachandra Sastri author of the first original Telugu Drama, Manjarimadhukariam
Korada Mahadeva Sastri Indian linguist
Mahidhara Rammohan Rao Telugu literature
Mahidhara Nalinimohan Indian space scientist & Telugu writer

Khandavalli Lakshmi Ranjanam and Khandavalli Balendu Sekharam brothers (Telugu Literature)
Penumarti Viswanatha Sastry known by his pen name "Ajanta"; Telugu writer & editor
Bhattam Srirama Murthy, ex-MLA from Dharmavaram
Vulimiri Ramalingaswami, ex-Director of AIIMS, medical scientist, pathologist and medical writer
Upadrasta Ramamurty, President's Chair Professor of Mechanical and Aerospace Engineering & Materials Science and Engineering at the Nanyang Technological University
