= P. Gannavaram =

Paata Gannavaram
- Village
- Interactive map of Paata Gannavaram
- Location in Andhra Pradesh, India
- Coordinates: 16.61308°N 81.89399°E
- Country: India
- State: Andhra Pradesh
- District: Konaseema
- Mandal: P. Gannavaram

Government
  - Type: Gram Panchayat
  - Sarpanch: Bondada Nagamani

Population (2011)
  - Total: 9,003

Languages
  - Official: Telugu
- Time zone: UTC+5:30 (IST)
- PIN: 533240
- Telephone code: 08855
- Vehicle Registration: AP05 (Former); AP39 (from 30 January 2019)

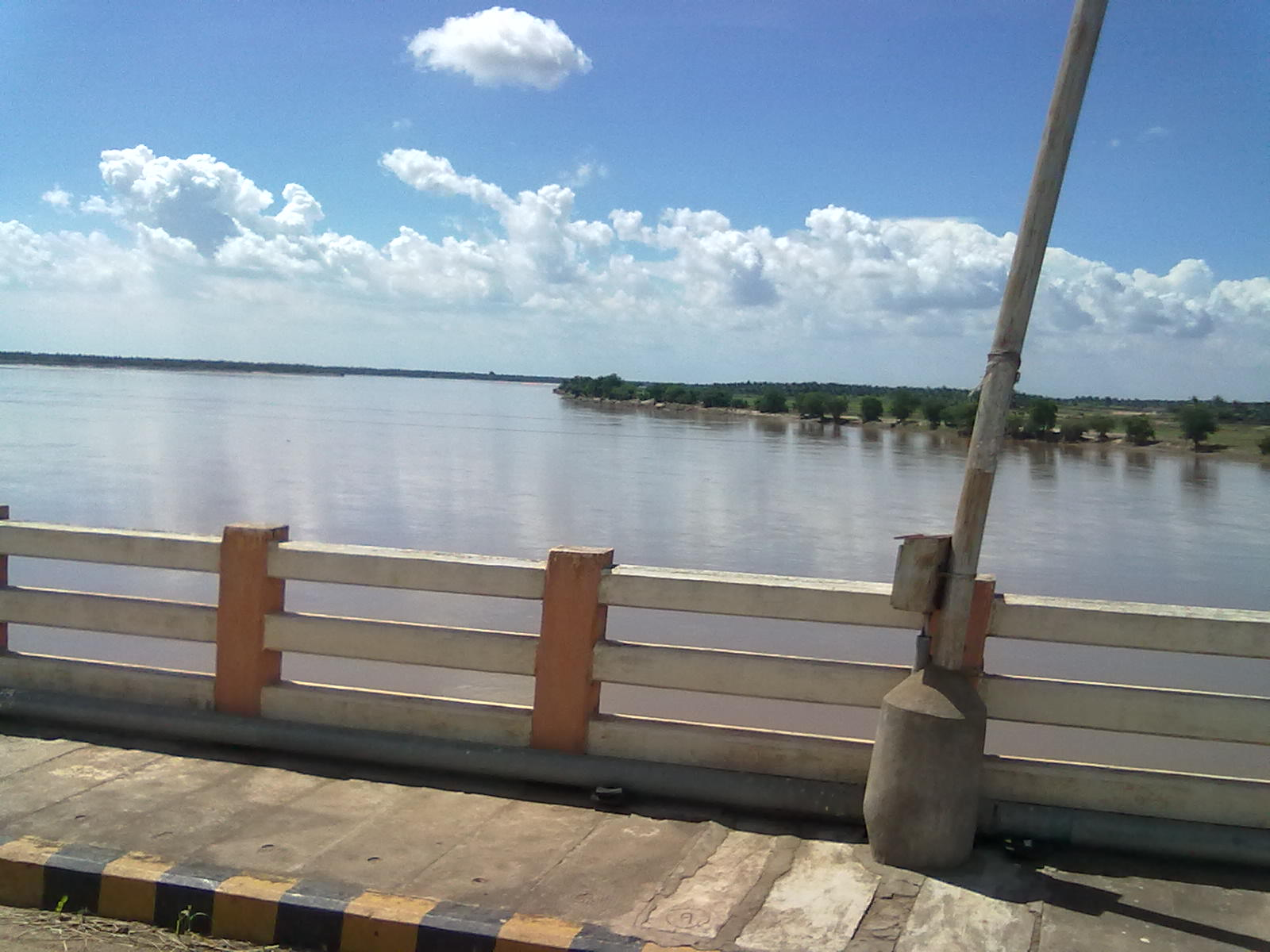
Godavari River at Flood time in P.Gannavaram

Paata Gannavaram is a village in P. Gannavaram mandal of Dr. B. R. Ambedkar Konaseema district (formerly East Godavari) located in the state of Andhra Pradesh, India.

== Etymology ==
Sage Vainateya stole a part of the Vasishta River from Sage Vasishta. Vasishta cursed sage Vainateya for having stealthily taken a part of the Vasishta River. To be free from the curse of Vasishta, Vainateya prayed Garuda, the vehicle of Lord Vishnu to bring a Sivalingam from Varanasi to install it there. While Garuda was bringing the Sivalingam, it slipped and fell in this village and it was installed here alone. From then onwards this place came to be known as Garudavaram which became Gannavaram over time.

Paata Gannavaram is also known as Delta Gannavaram or Arthur Gannavaram after Arthur Cotton, the British Irrigation Engineer and Military General who was behind the construction of the aqueduct.

== Land of Vedic Scholars ==
Nestled in the Konaseema region, Gannavaram is celebrated for its natural scenery. While exploring the region, one will encounter many Agraharams, traditional Brahmin streets, awarded to Vedic scholars in recognition of their scholarly achievements. The region has been a hub of Vedic culture for centuries, home to highly devout Telugu Brahmins renowned for their success in all six schools of Indian philosophy: Samkhya, Yoga, Nyaya, Vaisheshika, Mimamsa and Vedanta.

== Notable people ==
- Jagannatha Panditaraja(1590-1670) - the 17th-century poet, musician, and sanskrit scholar from Munganda, P.Gannavaram mandal.
- Dokka Seethamma (or Sithamma, 1841–1909) - popularly known as 'Annapurna', from Lankala Gannavaram, P. Gannavaram mandal.
- Khandavalli Lakshmi Ranjanam (1908-1986) - doyen of Telugu Literature, former professor and principal of Arts College, Osmania University.He was from Bellampudi, P. Gannavaram mandal.
- Mahidhara Rammohan Rao(1909-2000) - freedom fighter, novelist, and journalist from Munganda, P. Gannavaram mandal.
- Korada Subrahmanyam (1954) - Sanskrit grammarian, scholar, and retired Professor of Sanskrit at the University of Hyderabad is from Bellampudi, P. Gannavaram mandal.

== See also ==
- Nagullanka
- Konaseema
- Gannavaram (SC) (Assembly constituency)
