= Pothukurru =

- Village
- Interactive map of Pothukurru
- Location in Andhra Pradesh, India
- Coordinates: 16.62195°N 82.02665°E
- Country: India
- State: Andhra Pradesh
- District: Konaseema

Government
  - Type: Grama Panchayati

Languages
  - Official: Telugu
- Time zone: UTC+5:30 (IST)
- PIN: 533577
- Telephone code: 91 8856
- Grama Devatha is Thallamma Thalli

Pothukurru is a village of Ainavilli Mandal in Konaseema district in the state of Andhra Pradesh in India. It is a part of the P.Gannavaram Assembly Constituency and the Amalapuram Lok Sabha Constituency.

== Geography ==
Pothukurru is located near 16.62195°N 82.02665°E. It has an average elevation of 1 meter.
