= Suniti Kumar Chatterji =

Indian linguist (1890–1977)

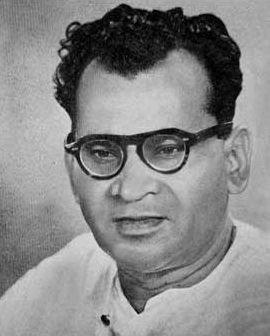
- Chatterji, c. 1950
- Born: 26 November 1890; Howrah, Bengal Presidency, British India
- Died: 29 May 1977 (aged 86); Calcutta, West Bengal, India
- Occupations: Linguist, Educationist and Litterateur
- Awards: Padma Vibhushan (1955)

Suniti Kumar Chatterji FRS (26 November 1890 – 29 May 1977) was an Indian linguist, educationist and litterateur. He was a recipient of the second highest civilian award in India, Padma Vibhushan.

== Life ==
=== Childhood ===
Chatterji was born on 26 November 1890, at Shibpur in Howrah. He was the son of Haridas Chattopadhyay, an affluent Bengali Kulin Brahmin. According to the family history, their ancestors were originally residents of a village named chatuti in the Rarh region of present-day West Bengal. During the Turkic invasion of Bengal in the thirteenth century, the Chatterji family left their ancestral village in West Bengal and took shelter in East Bengal. Later Professor Chatterji's great-grandfather Sri Bhairab Chatterji, migrated to a village in the district of Hooghly from his ancestral village home in the district of Faridpur in East Bengal, now in Bangladesh. Bhairab Chatterji, like many other Kulin Brahmins of the day, subsisted mainly on polygamy. Bhairab had a few wives, but he lived with the one who had belonged to the village in Hooghly. Bhairab's son Isvarchandra, the grandfather of Chatterji, had served the East India Company in North India during the Mutiny. After retirement, he built a modest one storied house for himself in Calcutta and shifted there the residence of the family from the Hooghly village. Isvar's son Haridas Chatterji was the father of Suniti Kumar Chatterji.

=== Education ===
Chatterji was a meritorious student, and passed the Entrance (school leaving) examination from the Mutty Lal Seal's Free School (1907), ranking sixth, and the FA (pre-university examination) from the renowned Scottish Church College, standing third. He did his Major (Honours) in English literature from Presidency College, Kolkata, standing first in the first class in 1911. His childhood friend was the famous industrialist Nagendra Nath Das founder of Power Tools And Appliance Co. Ltd. In 1913, he completed his M.A. in English literature, again standing first. The same year, he was appointed lecturer in English at Vidyasagar College, Kolkata where his colleague was the thespian, Sisir Kumar Bhaduri.

=== Profession ===
In 1914, Chatterji became assistant professor of English in the Post-Graduate Department of the University of Calcutta, which he held till 1919. He went abroad to study at the University of London where he studied Phonology, Indo-European Linguistics, Prakrit, Persian, Old Irish, Gothic and other languages. He then went to Paris and did research at the Sorbonne in Indo-Aryan, Slavic and Indo-European Linguistics, Greek and Latin. His teacher was the internationally acclaimed linguist, Jules Bloch. After returning to India in 1922, he joined the University of Calcutta as the Khaira Professor of Indian Linguistics and Phonetics. After retirement in 1952, he was made professor emeritus and later in 1965, the National Research Professor of India for Humanities. He was Chairman of the West Bengal Legislative Council (1952–58) and President (1969) of the Sahitya Akademi.

=== Foreign travel with Tagore ===
In 1927, Chatterji accompanied Rabindranath Tagore to Malaya, Siam, Sumatra, Java, and Bali on a fundraising mission for Tagore's Visva-Bharati University and to study the legacies of ancient Indian art, culture and religion in Southeast Asia. His travelogue was serialised in Prabasi and the Modern Review and he became an active member of the Calcutta-based Greater India Society, co-founded by his friends Kalidas Nag and Prabodh Chandra Bagchi in 1926.

== Views ==
His opinion on the historicity of the Ramayana is quoted by Anil Kumar Kanjilal in his introduction to Chatterji's work, The Ramayana: Its Character, Genesis, History, Expansion and Exodus (1978). Chatterji says: 'There is evidently no historical core below the surface-no scholar of Indian history now thinks that Rama, the hero of the Ramayana, was a historical person, who can be relegated to a particular period of time.'

On the question of author of the Ramayana, Chatterji says, 'The mythological saint Chyavana, described in the Satapatha Brahmana and the Mahabharatha, initiated the composition of this epic (Ramayana). Valmiki ... later imparted poetic lustre to the composition of his predecessor'.

== Bibliography ==
- — (1921). "Bengali Phonetics" (PDF). Bulletin of the School of Oriental Studies, University of London. 2 (1). London: Cambridge University Press: 1–25. doi:10.1017/S0041977X0010179X. JSTOR 607733.
- — (September 1923). "The Study of Kol". The Calcutta Review: 451–473.
- — (1926). The Origin and Development of the Bengali Language. Calcutta: Calcutta University Press.
- — (1927). Bengali Self-Taught. Marlborough's Self-Taught Series.
- — (1928). A Bengali Phonetic Reader. University of London Press.
- — (1931). "Calcutta Hindustani: A study of a Jargon Dialect". Indian Linguistics. 1 (2–4): 177–233.
- — (1935). "A Roman Alphabet for India". Calcutta University Phonetic Studies (4). Calcutta University Press.
- — (1936). "Purāṇa Legends and the Prakrit Tradition in New Indo-Aryan" (PDF). Bulletin of the School of Oriental Studies, University of London. 8 (2/3). London: Cambridge University Press: 457–466. doi:10.1017/S0041977X00141096. JSTOR 608054.
- — (1936). "Non-Aryan Elements in Indo-aryan". Journal of the Greater India Society.
- — (1940). Dwipmay Bharat দ্বীপময় ভারত [Island India] (in Bengali). Calcutta: Book Co.
- — (1951). Kirāta-jana-kṛti: the Indo-Mongoloids; their contribution to the history and culture of India. Royal Asiatic Society of Bengal.
- — (1942). Indo-Aryan and Hindi. University of Calcutta.
- — (1943). Language and Linguistic Problems. Oxford Pamphlets on Indian Affairs. Vol. 11. Oxford University Press.
- — (1953). "The Languages of the Adivasis". March of India. 6 (2).
- — (1957). Bharat - Sanskriti ভারত সংস্কৃতি [Culture of India] (in Bengali). Gupta-prakashika.
- —; Sukumar Sen (1960). A Middle Indo-Aryan Reader. Calcutta: Calcutta University.
- — (1960). "Mutual Borrowing in Indo-Aryan" (PDF). Bulletin of the Deccan College Post-Graduate and Research Institute. 20 (1). Pune: Deccan College Post-Graduate and Research Institute: 50–62. JSTOR 42929737.
- — (1963). Language and Literature of Modern India. Bengal Publishers.
- — (1965). "Race Movements and Prehistoric Culture". In R. C. Majumdar (ed.). The Vedic Age. Bombay: Bharatiya Vidya Bhawan.
- — (1966). The People, Language, and Culture of Orissa. Orissa Sahitya Akademi.
- — (1968). Balts and Aryans in Their Indo-European Background. Simla: Indian Institute of Advanced Study.
- — (1968). India and Ethiopia: From the Seventh Century B.C. Asiatic Society.
- — (1978). Ramayana: its Character, Genesis, History and Exodus: A Resume. Calcutta: Prajña.
- — (1970). The place of Assam in the history and civilisation of India. Dept. of Publication, University of Gauhati.
- — (1971). World Literature and Tagore. Visva-Bharati.
- — (1972). Iranianism: Iranian Culture and Its Impact on the World from Achaemenian Times. Asiatic Society. ISBN 9788195680658.
- — (1983). On the development of Middle Indo-Aryan. Sanskrit College.
- — (1984). B.B. Rajapurohit (ed.). "Spoken Word in the Speech-lore of India: the Background". Papers in Phonetics and Phonology: Proceedings of an Institute. Central Institute of Indian Languages.
- — (1986). "The Name 'Assam-Ahom'". Journal of the Asiatic Society. 28 (3).
- — (1986). "The Word About Igor's Folk (Slavo O Pulku Igoreve) As a Specimen of Old Slav and Indo-European Heroic Poetry". Journal of the Asiatic Society. 28 (3).
- — (1989). "Two New Indo-Aryan Etymologies". Indian Linguistics.

Bibliographies of Suniti Kumar Chatterji's work have also been published:

- Kanjilal, Anil Kumar. Suniti Kumar Chatterji: A Select Bibliography of his Writings (PDF).

== Notable students ==
- Sukumar Sen
- Korada Mahadeva Sastri

== Death ==
Suniti Kumar died on 29 May 1977 in Calcutta (present-day Kolkata). A large part of his house 'Sudharma' সুধর্মা, an architectural marvel, in South Calcutta has been converted into a Fabindia store.
