= P. Gannavaram mandal =

- Mandal
- Interactive Map Outlining mandal
- Location in Andhra Pradesh, India P. Gannavaram mandal (India)
- Coordinates: 16.4117°N 81.7448°E
- Country: India
- State: Andhra Pradesh
- District: Dr. B. R. Ambedkar Konaseema
- Headquarters: Patha Gannavaram

Area
  - Total: 80.06 km^{2} (30.91 sq mi)

Population (2011)
  - Total: 75,306
  - Density: 940.6/km^{2} (2,436/sq mi)

Languages
  - Official: Telugu
- Time zone: UTC+5:30 (IST)

P. Gannavaram mandal is one of the 22 mandals in Dr. B. R. Ambedkar Konaseema district of Andhra Pradesh. It is under the administration of Kothapeta revenue division and the headquarters are located at Patha Gannavaram village.

== Demographics ==
According to 2011 census of India, in P. Gannavaram mandal, there are a total of 20,411 households. The population of this area is 75,306, with 38,097 males and 37,209 females. The Scheduled Castes comprise 25,833 individuals and there are 622 individuals from Scheduled Tribes. In terms of literacy, 52,776 people are literate, including 28,213 males and 24,563 females. And there are 31,316 workers in the area, with 22,476 males and 8,840 females.

== Towns and villages ==
As of 2011 census, the mandal has 8 villages. The settlements in the mandal are listed below:

1. Bellampudi
2. Ganti Pedapudi
3. Karupallipadu
4. Katharlanka
5. Kundalapalle
6. Lankalagannavaram
7. Manepalle
8. Mondepu Lanka
9. Munganda
10. Mungandapalem
11. Munjavaram
12. Narendrapuram
13. Patha Gannavaram
14. Pothavaram
15. Udumudi
16. Vadrevupalle
17. Vainateya Kothapalle
18. Yenugupalle
