= Vegunta Mohan Prasad =

Telugu poet and writer (1942-2011)

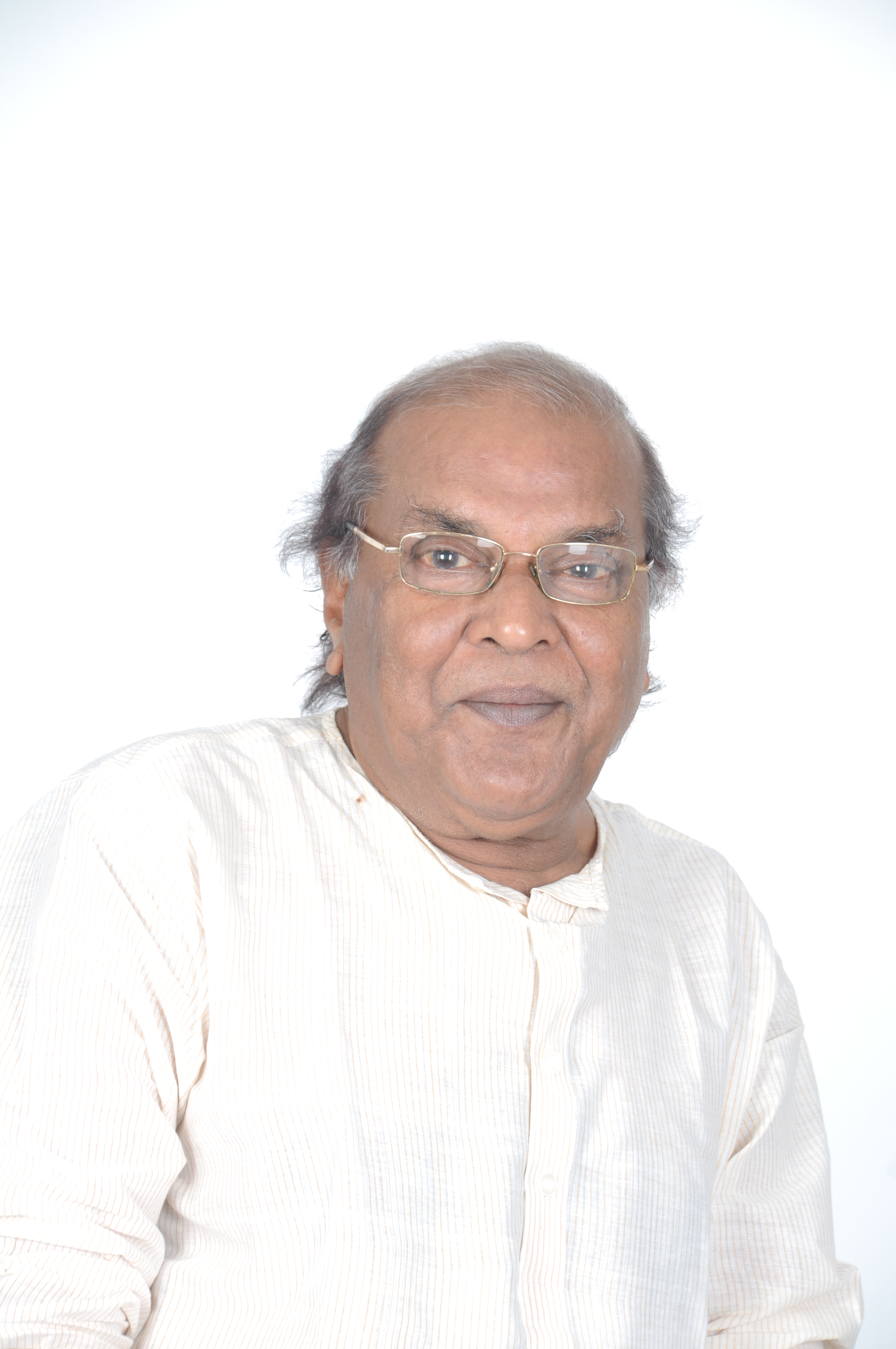
- Born: 5 January 1942; Guntur district, Andhra Pradesh, India
- Died: 3 August 2011 (aged 69)
- Education: Master of Arts, PGDTE
- Alma mater: Andhra Christian College, Guntur; Banaras Hindu University; Central Institute of English and Foreign Languages (CIEFL)
- Occupations: Professor, poet, critic, translator, writer
- Employer(s): P. B. Siddhartha College of Arts and Science, Vijayawada
- Spouse: Sujata
- Children: Mamata

Vegunta Mohan Prasad (5 January 1942 – 3 August 2011) was a Telugu poet, critic, translator and writer. He was known by his pen name 'Mo'.

== Biography ==
Mohan Prasad was born in Lam, Guntur District, Andhra Pradesh. He completed schooling in Andhra Pradesh and graduated with a B.A from the Andhra Christian College, Guntur. He obtained his Master of Arts in English from the Banaras Hindu University and PGDTE from Central Institute of English and Foreign Languages (CIEFL). In 1967, he married Sujata, the daughter of Bondalapati Sivaramakrishna and Sakuntala Devi of Desi Kavita Mandali.

== Career ==
Mo taught English literature as a profession. He was the Head of the Department of English in P. B. Siddhartha College of Arts and Science in Vijayawada. Mo had deep interest in literature and upon his retirement, he took up the role of Director of Anusrijana, the translation wing of Dravidian University, where he organized translations of about a hundred classic works from regional languages into English.

== Literary contributions ==
Mo published volumes of Telugu poetry, literary appreciation, and translations of Telugu poetry into English and vice versa. Recognition as a poet came with the publication of Chiti-Chinta, in 1969. This Tense Time, published by Mo in 1982, is one of the first comprehensive volumes of modern Telugu poetry in English translation and was reviewed by the British poet and literary critic Derek Stanford. Between Chiti – Chinta in 1969 and Mo –Nishadam in 2010, he was prolific in his literary contributions in the form of poetry, appreciations and translations.

== Awards ==
Recognition and awards for Mo's works include:

- Devarakonda Balagangadhara Tilak Award (1969),
- Free Verse Front Award (1970),
- Writers Grant from ASRC (1976), Nutalapati award (1993),
- Telugu University (for best poetry) in 1994
- A.P State Government Official Languages Award (2001), Surapaneni award (2002)
- Yagalla Foundation annual award (2001).
- Telugu University lifetime achievement (2005)
- In 2011, he was awarded the Tanikella Bharani Sahitya Puraskaram for his book Mo – Nishadam.

== Bibliography ==
Poetry and Literary Appreciation:

- Chiti – Chinta (1969). Telugu poetry.
- Silent Secret (1976). English poetry.
- Bathikina Kshanalu (1990). Telugu poetry.
- Rahastantri (1992). Telugu poetry.
- Punarapi (1993). Telugu poetry.
- Saandhya Basha (1999). Telugu poetry.
- Karachaalanam (1999). Essays on 20th century British, American, Australian, French, Italian, German and Indo-Anglian poetry.
- Needalu Jaadalu (2002). A volume of literary criticism.
- Vennela Needalu (2003). A volume of literary criticism.
- Mo Nishadam (2010). Telugu Poetry.
- Saraamsam (2013). Anthology of selected poetry published posthumously.
- Mo Nishadam (2013). Translated into Kannada by C. Raghunath

=== Translations ===
- Shakespeare Rupaka Pravachanalu (1993). Selected plays of Shakespeare translated into Telugu.
- Swasakalau (1994). Translation of Segments – a semi-autobiographical long poem composed by Tripura.
- Dream Script (2003). Translation of Ajanta's Swapnalipi commissioned by Sahitya Akademi
- Swarajyam (2011). Translation of Mahidhara Rammohan Rao’s Kollayigattitheynemi. Published by Oxford University Press. ISBN 978-0198077374
- Seeds of Black Soil. Translation of Chandra Latha's Telugu novel Regadi Vitthulu
- Sikhamani selected poems (2010)

=== Edited anthologies ===
- This Tense Time (1981). Anthology of selected Telugu poems published from 1915 to 1980 translated into English.
- Kommalu Remmalu (2005).

=== Books published on Mo ===
- Namo (2011): Tributes to Mo from friends and family.

== Death ==
Mo died on 3 August 2011 due to brain hemorrhage. He has donated his organs - kidneys, liver and eyes - to Mohan Foundation.
