= Nagullanka =

- Village
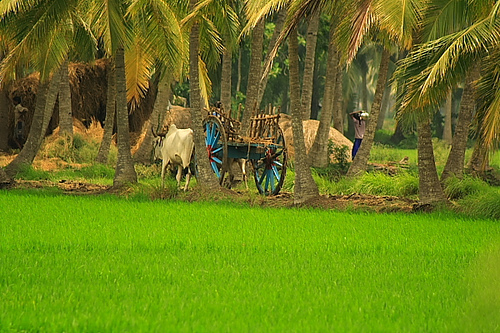
- Scenic Greenery by Kotikalapudi
- Interactive map of Nagullanka
- Location in Andhra Pradesh, India
- Coordinates: 16°31′58″N 81°52′22″E
- Country: India
- State: Andhra Pradesh
- District: Konaseema

Languages
  - Official: Telugu
- Time zone: UTC+5:30 (IST)

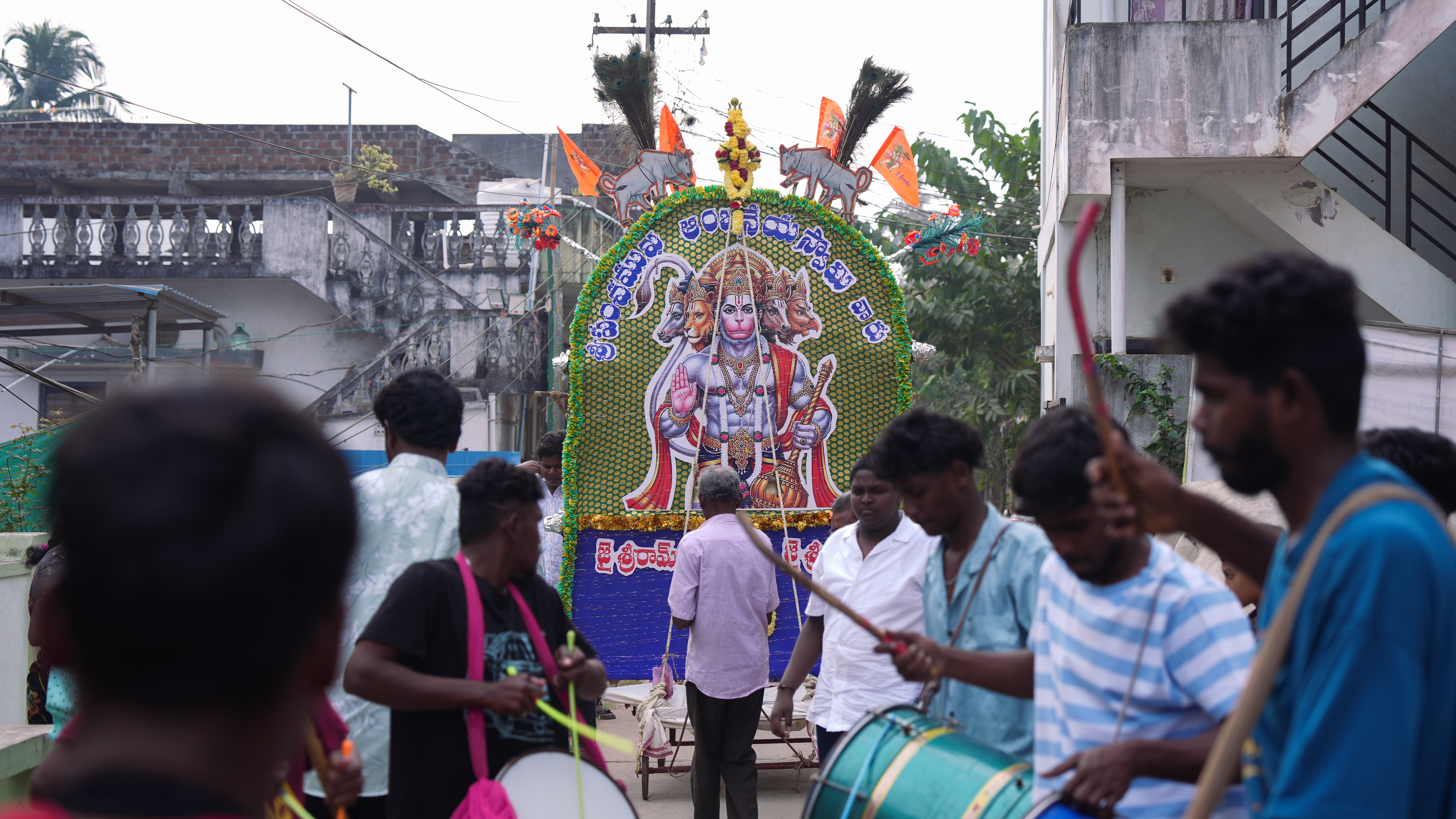
Nagulanka Prabha 2026

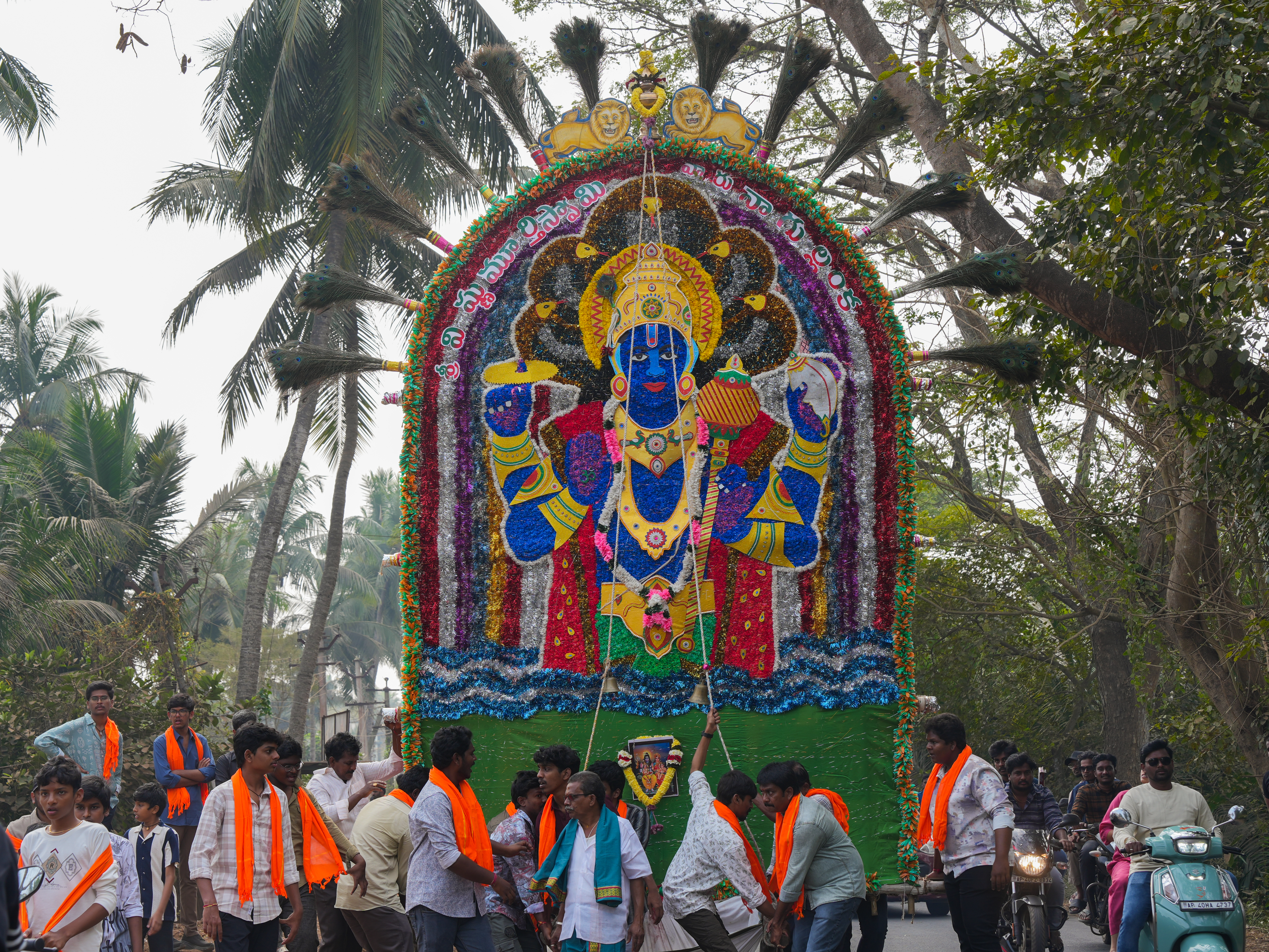
Nagullanka Peddha Prabha - 2026

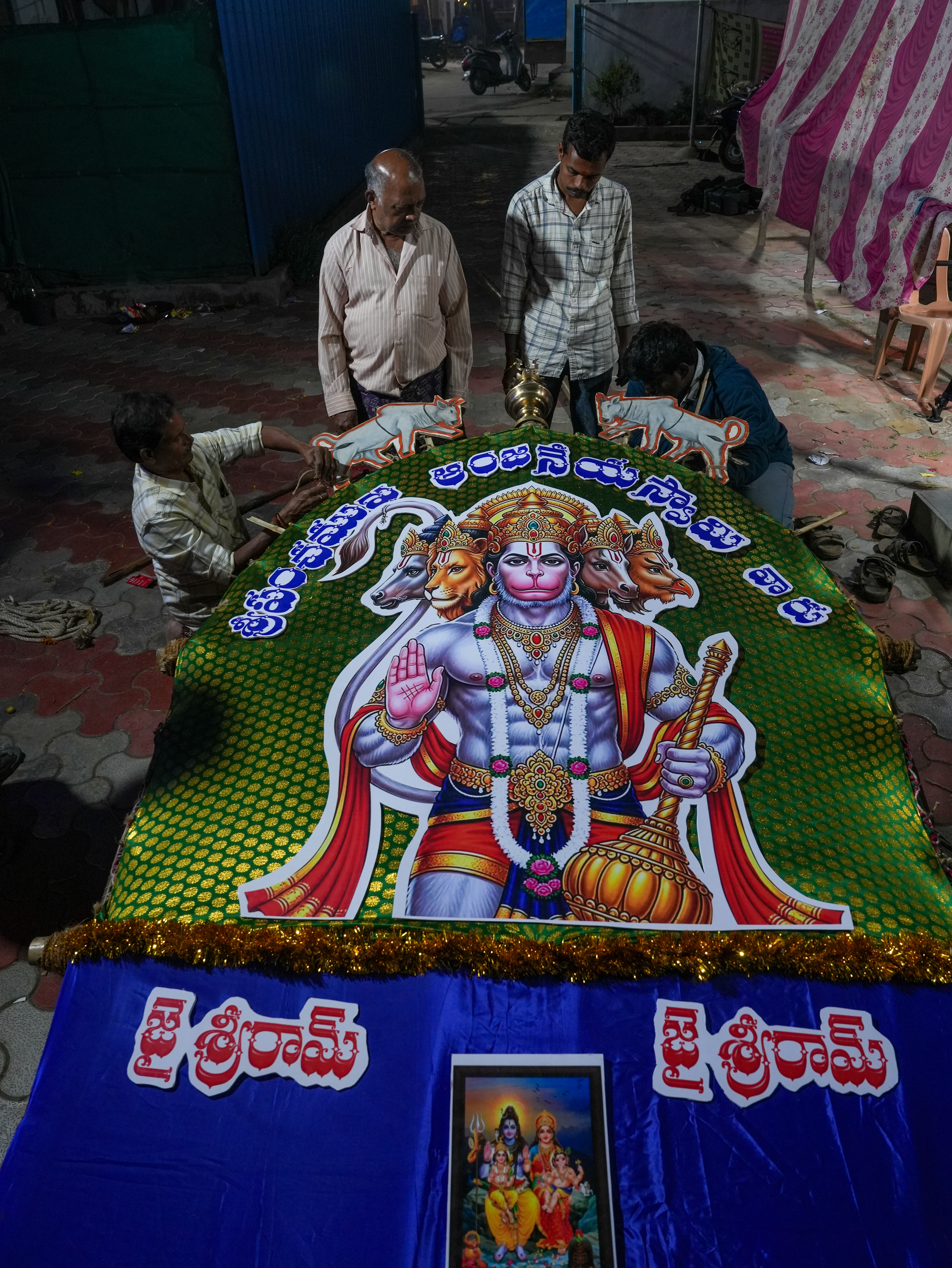
Nagullanka Prabhala Theertham Preparations 2026

Nagullanka is a village in Konaseema district of the Indian state of Andhra Pradesh. It is located in P.Gannavaram mandal.

== Geography ==
Nagullanka covers a vast portion of the delta area of the Godavari river. This village is located on the north-east coast of Andhra Pradesh. It is bounded by Amalapuram on the north and by Bay of Bengal on the south and by West Godavari district on the west. It is situated between the northern latitudes of 16* 30' and 18* and between 81* 30' and 82* 30' of the eastern longitudes. Nagullanka village is verry good natural village.
