= Ganti Pedapudi =

- village
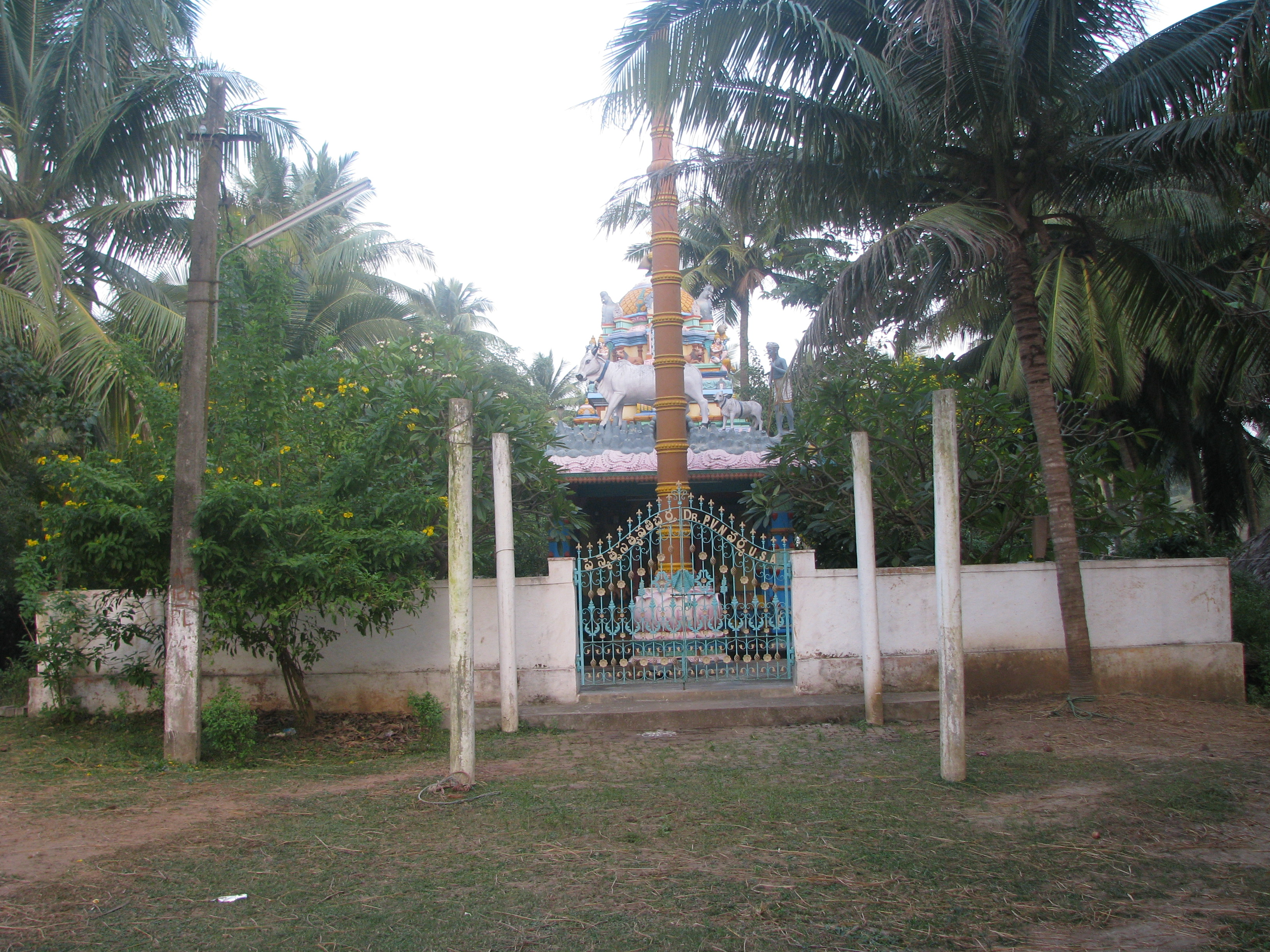
- Pedapudi Temple
- Interactive map of Ganti Pedapudi
- Location in Andhra Pradesh, India Ganti Pedapudi (India)
- Coordinates: 16.9667°N 82.1667°E
- Country: India
- State: Andhra Pradesh
- District: Konaseema
- Mandal: P. Gannavaram
- Elevation: 7 m (23 ft)

Population (2000)
  - Total: 7,000

Languages
  - Official: Telugu
- Time zone: UTC+5:30 (IST)
- PIN: 533274
- Telephone code: 08855

Ganti Pedapudi (village code 587780) is located in the P. Gannavaram mandal of Dr. B. R. Ambedkar Konaseema district in Andhra Pradesh, India. The village spans approximately 435 hectares and had a population of around 4,150 as per the 2011 census, with 2,112 males and 2,038 females, and a literacy rate of 68.8%. Historically, Ganti Pedapudi has served as a gram panchayat within the mandal, governing local administration and rural infrastructure in the region.

== Geography ==
Peddapudi is located at 16.9667°N 82.1667°E. Its average elevation is 7 meters (26 feet).

== Gallery ==
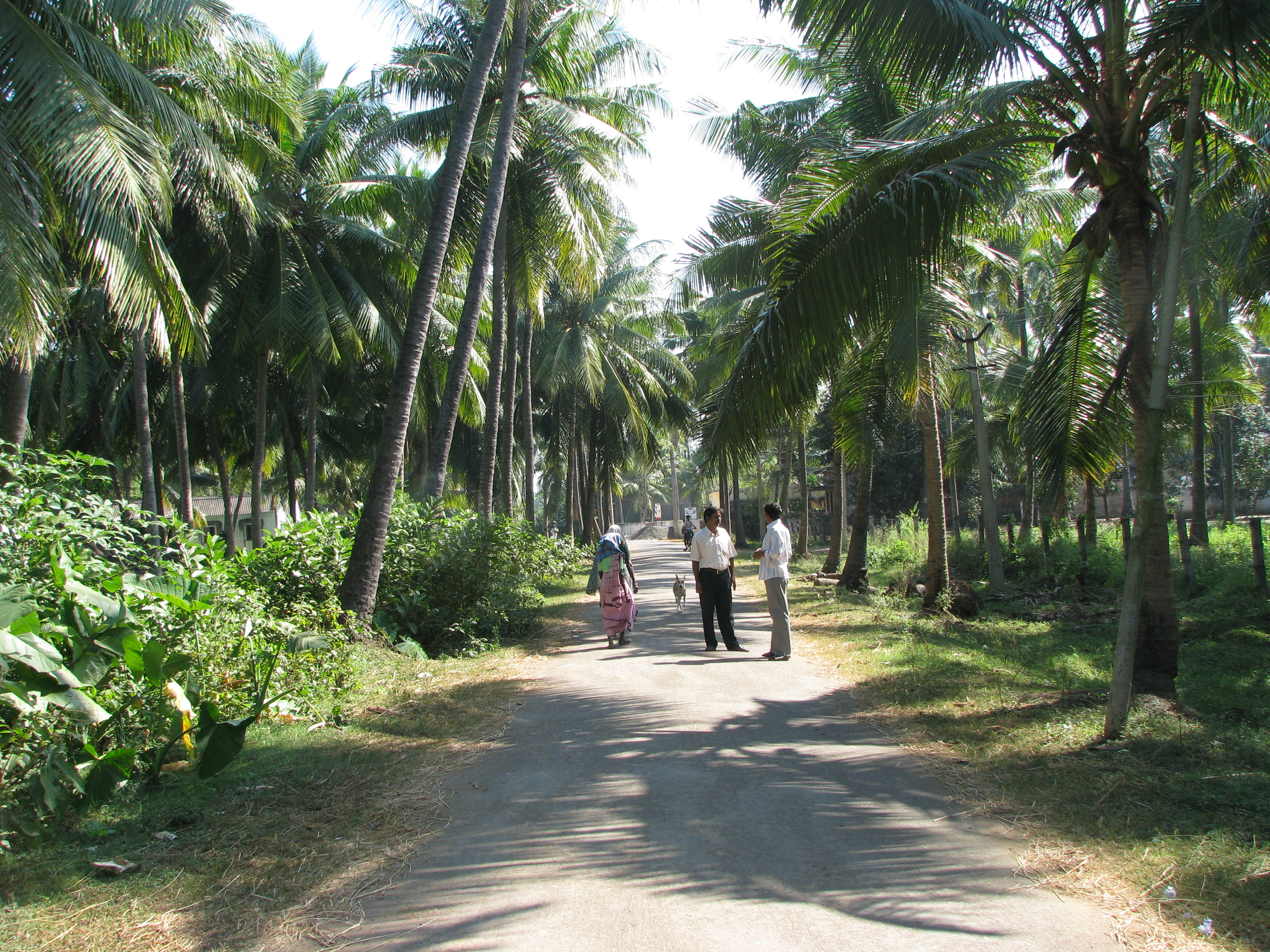
School street

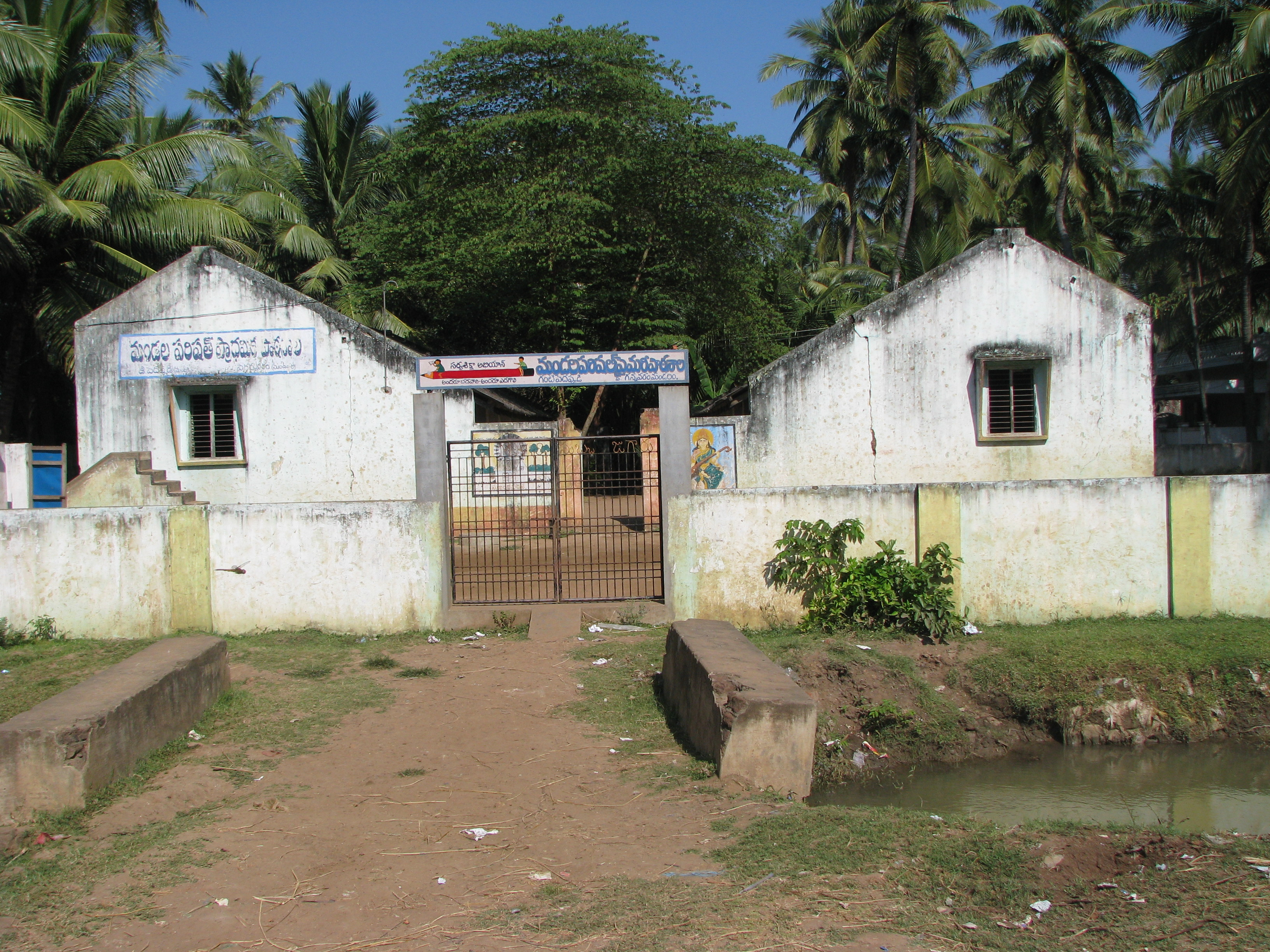
School
