= Narendrapuram =

- village
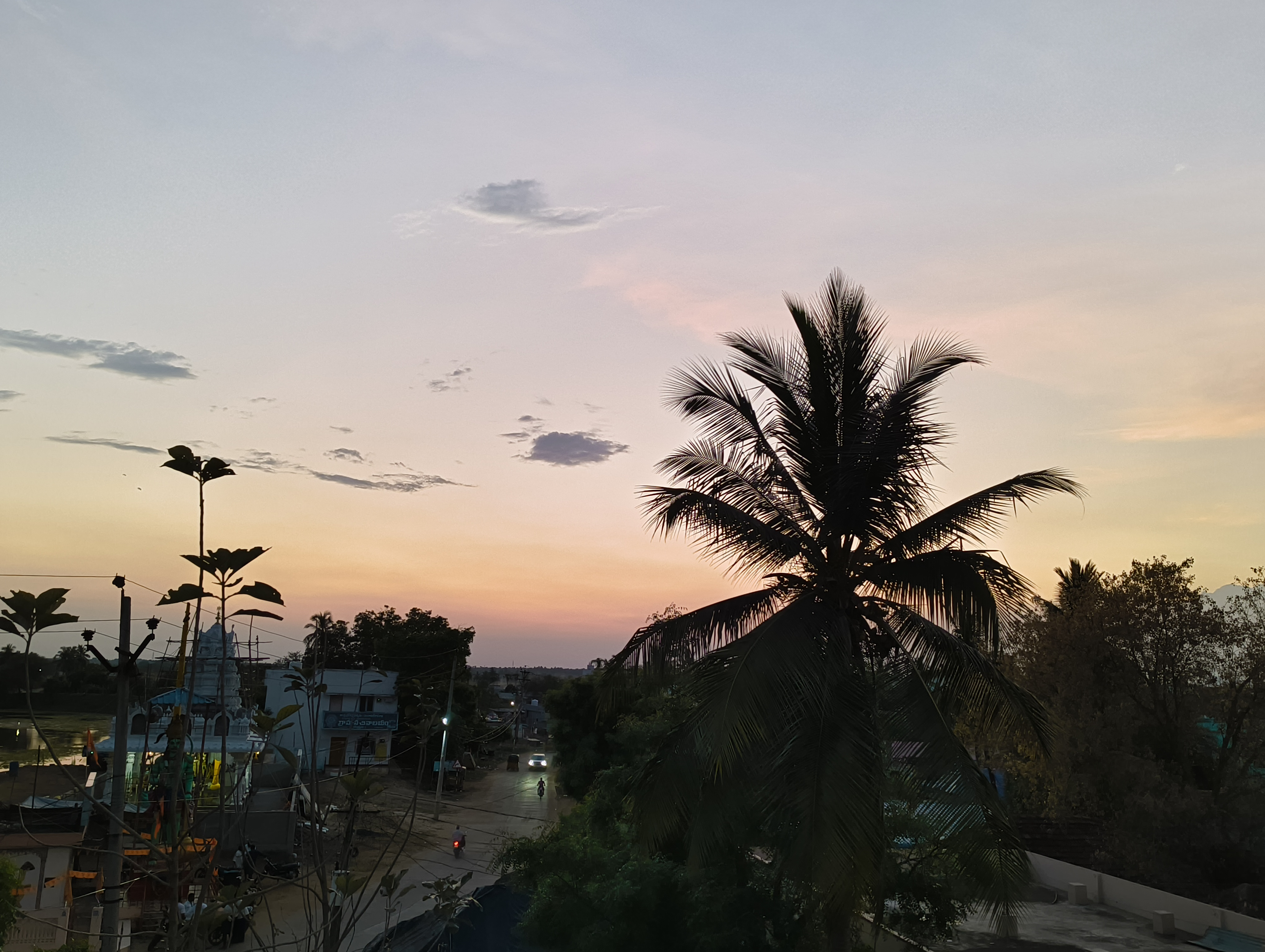
- Interactive map of Narendrapuram
- Location in Andhra Pradesh, India
- Coordinates: 17.0964°N 81.8812°E
- Country: India
- State: Andhra Pradesh
- District: East Godavari
- Mandal: Rajanagaram

Government
  - Type: panchayat

Population (2011)
  - Total: 15,607

Languages
  - Official: Telugu
- Time zone: UTC+5:30 (IST)
- Postal code: 533294

Narendrapuram is a village in Rajanagaram mandal of Rajahmundry revenue division. It is located near the eastern outskirts of Rajamahendravaram city.
