= Mahidhara Nalinimohan =

Indian writer

- Born: 4 August 1933; Munganda, East Godavari district, Andhra Pradesh, India
- Died: 23 October 2005 (aged 72); Hyderabad
- Education: Ph.D in Physics
- Alma mater: Osmania University; Moscow University
- Occupations: Space scientist, science writer
- Spouse: Mahidhara Subhadra (née Nemani)
- Parents: Mahidhara Rammohan Rao (father); Mahidhara Kameswari (née Chelluri) (mother)

Mahidhara Nalinimohan (4 August 1933 – 23 October 2005) was an Indian space scientist and writer from Andhra Pradesh. He wrote many articles on popular science in Telugu. His father Mahidhara Rammohan Rao was a noted novelist, journalist, and freedom fighter.

== Early life ==
He was born on 4 August 1933 in Munganda, East Godavari district of Andhra Pradesh, in a patriotic family. His father Mahidhara Rammohan Rao was a noted novelist, journalist, and freedom fighter. Having grown up in a house of literary movement, he began writing poetry at the age of 15. He later became a science writer. He completed his master's in physics from Osmania University in 1955 and got his PhD from Moscow University in 1963.

== Career ==
After carrying out research in countries like Sweden and Bulgaria, he came to India and joined the National Physical Laboratory in New Delhi. He took part in launching 16 satellites. He researched atmospheric changes in the upper ionosphere in the capacity of deputy director of the Laboratory.

== Awards ==
- Kavi Kokila Duvvuri Ramireddy Vignana Bahumati
- Indira Gandhi Vignana Bahumati

== Death ==
Nalini Mohan died on 23 October 2005 in an old-age home in Hyderabad. He was survived by his son and three daughters.
