= Jagannatha Panditaraja =

Indian Sanskrit scholar from the 17th century

- Born: Jagannatha Khandrika (Upadrasta); 1590; Munikhanda Agraharam, Golconda Sultanate
- Died: 1670 (aged 79–80); Varanasi, Awadh Subah, Mughal Empire
- Occupations: Poet, musician and literary critic
- Spouse: Kameswari

Jagannātha (1590-1670), also known as Jagannātha Paṇḍita or Jagannātha Paṇḍitarāja, or Jagannatha Pandita Rayalu, was a poet, musician and literary critic who lived in the 17th century. He was a Telugu Brahmin from Khandrika (Upadrasta - Supervisor of the sacrificial rites) family and a junior contemporary of Emperor Akbar. As a literary theorist or rhetorician, he is known for Rasagaṅgādhara, a work on poetic theory. As a poet, he is known for writing the Bhāminī-vilāsa ("The Sport of the Beautiful Lady (Bhāminī)". His title Paṇḍitarāja means "king of poets" and he received other titles from the Mughal emperor Shah Jahan, at whose court he received patronage.

== Birth and personal life ==
Jagannatha was born (in 1590 AD or 1572 AD ) in an Andhra Veginadu Brahmin family and there is a belief that he belongs to Munikhanda Agraharam (present-day Munganda), Amalapuram Taluk, Andhra Pradesh, India. His parents were Perambhatta (Perubhatta) and Laxmi.

Jagannatha married his close cousin, Kameswari Cherukuri (d.1625) of Bellampudi Village, (P. Gannavaram mandal, East Godavari) and had a son by name Madhava Bhattu. He lost his wife at an early age.

As per Prof. Sriramachandrudu, there is another tradition that Jagannatha was born near the village Davuluru, Tenali taluk of Guntur District, modern Andhra Pradesh. It is claimed that Ramachandrabhattu, the younger brother of Jagannatha received the village Davuluru as an inam in 1660 AD from Ajahassen Qutub Shah of Golkonda who ruled from 1658-1687. There are many people from the Upadrasta family residing near Davuluru and they claim that those in the Godavari district were emigrants from this village.

Prof. Athavale cites a biography named Sampradaya Kalpadruma authored by some Vitthalanatha (Manaranjana Kavi), in which it has been mentioned that Jagannath Panditaraja was the grandson of Vitthalanatha(Gusainji) who in turn was the son of Vallabhacharya, the founder of the Krishna-centered Pushtimarg sect of Vaishnavism in the Braj (Vraja) region of India and the philosophy of Śuddhādvaita.

Based on the above accounts, it is difficult to fix the birthplace of Jagannatha and he might not have lived in Andhra at all or would have migrated at a very young age to Varanasi.

In the introductory verse of Rasagangadhara, Jagannatha named his father Perubhatta as his teacher who was proficient in all branches of learning. Except for Vyakarana, which he studied under SesaViresvara, Jagannatha studied all other Sastras under his father. Bhaṭṭabhaṭṭāraka Perubhatta studied Vedanta under Jnanendra Bhiksu, Nyaya, and Vaisesika under Maheswara Pandita, and Mimamsa under one Deva ( who according to Nagesabhatta was none other than Khandadevamisra(d.1665) and Vyakarana under SesaVireswara, the son of SesaKrsna and the classmate of Bhaṭṭoji Dīkṣita(1550-1630).

Perubhatta is also referred to as Raghunadhabhatta in Pranabharanam and as Jogesvarasuri in a commentary on Bhaminivilasa by Jagannatha's grandson Mahadeva Suri(son of Madhava Diksita). "Ganga Lahari" is a composition of 52 Sanskrit Shlokas by Jagannath Pandit and has historic importance.

Jagannatha Pandita had a love affair with Lavangi, a Muslim woman, and wrote about her in his poetry.

== Relationship with the Mughals ==
Jagannatha Pandita spent time at the Mughal courts of Jahangir and Shah Jahan. The Mughals valued his knowledge of Sanskrit texts and Shah Jahan's historians called Jagannatha Pandita maha-kab-ray (great king of poets). Jagannatha was also a Hindustani singer for the Mughals.

== Work ==
1. Bhaminivilasa - a collection of miscellaneous verses composed on different occasions.
2. "Rasa Gangadharam" (Alankara Sastram),
3. Ganga Lahari,
4. Five Vilasams

=== The Bhāminī-vilāsa ===
The Bhāminī-vilāsa is divided into four chapters, each called vilāsa, and containing about a hundred verses (in the manner of a śataka). Only two of them, namely the first and the last, have been published. Many of the verses are infused with personal touches serving as the poet's memoirs. The collection is named after the poet's first wife Bhamini whom he had lost at a very young age before he launched into his scholarly career. The number of verses per chapter varies between manuscripts:

- The first, anyokti-vilāsa, contains allegorical (anyokti) stanzas about life in general (nīti). It has 100 to 130 stanzas.
- The second, śṛṅgāra-vilāsa, contains love poems. It has 101 to 184 stanzas.
- The third, karuṇā-vilāsa, contains laments mourning the death of the beautiful lady (Bhāminī).
- The fourth, śānta-vilāsa, contains verses on renunciation (vairagya). It has 31 to 46 stanzas.

=== Example verses ===
From the Rasa-gaṅgādhara

The Retort
"Small-waisted girl why are you so thin?"
"Why do you concern yourself with other people's affairs?"
"Tell me nonetheless, and give me joy."
"Go away, traveller, your wife will tell you."

— Translated by J. M. Masson

From the Bhāminī-vilāsa

A Word of Warning
My soul, I tell you, watch out. Don't take up with that cowherd.
Whose skin is the hue of fresh rain clouds, the one who pastures
His herd in Vrindavana. He's shrewd. He'll charm you first with his smile,
Then his looks. Your senses will fail, and then oblivion.

— Translated by Vidya Niwas Mishra, Leonard Nathan and Sachchidananda Vatsyayan

=== Devotional poems ===
He composed five devotional poems, each of whose names contains the word laharī ("a large wave"):

- Amṛta-laharī, in praise of the river Yamunā, 10 stanzas long,
- Sudhā-laharī, in praise of Sūrya the sun god, 30 stanzas long,
- Gaṅgā-laharī, addressed to the river Gaṅgā, 53 stanzas long,
- Karuṇā-laharī, in praise of Kṛṣṇa (Krishna), 60 stanzas long, and
- Lakṣmī-laharī, in praise of the goddess Lakshmi, 40 stanzas long.

== As a scholar ==
Jagannātha was a junior contemporary of Appayya Dīkṣita(1520-1593) of whom he wrote disparagingly. He wrote the Kaustubha-khaṇḍana, criticizing Bhaṭṭoji Dīkṣita's Śabda-kaustubha, and Prauḍha-manoramā-khaṇḍana (also called manoramā-kuca-mardana) criticizing the explanations of his Prauḍha-manoramā. Other minor works attributed to him include the Sāra-pradīpikā, a commentary on the Sārasvata Prakriyā or Sārasvata vyākaraṇa, an ancient grammatical work attributed to Narendra.

== Students of Jagannatha Panditaraja ==
Panditaraja had many disciples during his lifetime. One amongst them was Narayanabhatta of his own sect and the other is Sri kulapatimisra who belonged to the Mathura-Chaturvedi family of Agra. He was a court poet in the kingdom of Jayapuur under the patronage of Sriramasimhaji.

== Popular culture ==
There is a movie on Jagannatha Pandita Rayalu in Tamil (1946) and Hindi (1950). A Marathi musical drama was also a historic work of Shri Vidyadhar Gokhale in Mumbai in 1960.

There are few more art epics on "jagannath Pandit". A Marathi drama by Shri Vidyadhar Gokhale named "Pandit Raj Jagannath" Famous musical stage show was performed by leading artists Shri Bhalchandra Pendharkar, Prasad Sawkar, Mama Pendse, Chittaranjan Kolhatkar, Chandrakant Gokhale, Master Dattaram and Mangala Sanjhagiri and others under the famous banner of "Lalitkaladarsha" about 50 years back.(9-Oct 1960)

The film Lavangi based on Jagannatha pandita Rayalu was released in 1946

== Further reading and resources ==
- Lienhard, Siegfried (1984), Jan Gonda (ed.), A History of Classical Poetry: Sanskrit–Pali–Prakrit, A History of Indian Literature, vol. 3, Wiesbaden: Otto Harrassowitz
- Athavale, RB (1968), NEW LIGHT ON THE LIFE OF PAṆḌIṬARĀJA JAGANNĀTHA, Annals of the Bhandarkar Oriental Research Institute, vol. 48/49, pp. 415–20, Poona: Bhandarkar Oriental Research Institute
- Walimbe, YS (1974), PAṆḌITA JAGANNĀTHA: MIND AND PERSONALITY, Annals of the Bhandarkar Oriental Research Institute, vol. 55, pp. 93-106, Poona: Bhandarkar Oriental Research Institute
- Pullela, Sriramachandrudu (1991), Panditaraja Jagannatha - Makers of Indian Literature, Delhi: Sahitya Akademi
- Gangalahari Stotra. neelakanth publications. 1643, Sadashiv Peth, Pune Maharashtra India.
- Gangalahari stotra with Parady shloka by Waman Pandit. Saddharma prakashan.Thane Maharashtra India.
- Marathi Drama Panditraj Jagannath by Vidyadhar Gokhale.
- A Hindi movie of 1961 also presents some of the Sanskrit shlokas music composed by late shri Vasant Desai.
