= Mahidhara Rammohan Rao =

Indian writer

Mahidhara Rammohana Rao
- Born: 1 November 1909; Munganda, East Godavari district, Madras Presidency, British India
- Occupations: Writer, Novelist
- Spouse: Mahidhara Kameswari (née Chelluri)
- Children: Mahidhara Nalinimohan
- Parents: Mahidhara SuryaNarayana (father); Mahidhara Sarva Lakshmi (née Korada) (mother)
- Relatives: Khandavalli Lakshmi Ranjanam

Mahidhara Rammohana Rao was an Indian writer from Andhra Pradesh. His Telugu book Kollayi Gattitenemi?(What if he wears loin cloth only?) written in early 1960s won Andhra Pradesh Sahitya Academy award in 1969. The story of the book revolves around Congress lead Indian Independence movement. This book is translated into English with the title Swarajyam by Vegunta Mohan Prasad. He worked as a Sub-editor for the Andhra Communist Party mouthpiece Visalandhra in 1960s. His son Mahidhara Nalini Mohan is also a writer.

== Personal life ==
Rammohan Rao was born on 1 November 1909 in Munganda, East Godavari district of Madra Presidency. He was born in a highly orthodox brahmin family though this father Mahidhara Surya Narayana was a follower of Brahmo Samaj. Surya Narayana named his eldest son after a famous social reformer Raja Ram Mohan Roy. He started going to school from the age of 5 years. Inspired by revolutionary spirit of his family, at the age of 10 Mahidhara abandoned his studies in 1919 and joined Indian Freedom Struggle. Though he quit his formal education, he acquired scholarship of multiple languages including Telugu, Sanskrit, Hindi, Bengali, English, Russian mostly through self study using dictionaries.

== Career ==
In 1925 he joined Congress party. In 1932 he joined Congress Social Party established by Jayaprakash Narayan. After two years, he became a strong advocate of communism. He teamed up with his brothers and started a publishing house called Viswa Sahitya Mala (Garland of world literature). From 1936 to 1984, this house published a series of books to educate people in the philosophy of communism and socialism. These works include 50 translations from English to Telugu in addition to some original works.

Between 1940 and 1944 he was jailed for participating in independence struggle along with leaders like Neelam Sanjeeva Reddy and Alluri Sathyam. Jail life provided more time for him to read. In 1946, he started working as a sub-editor of Prajasakti daily. Later he joined Vishalandhra, where he worked till 1967.

== Novels ==
- Agnigundam
- Kollayi Gattitenemi? (What if he wears loin cloth?)
- Kattula Vantena (The bridge of knives)
- Evari Kosam (For whom?)
- Eedari Ekkadiki?
- Onamalu
- Subhalekha
