= Korada Mahadeva Sastri =

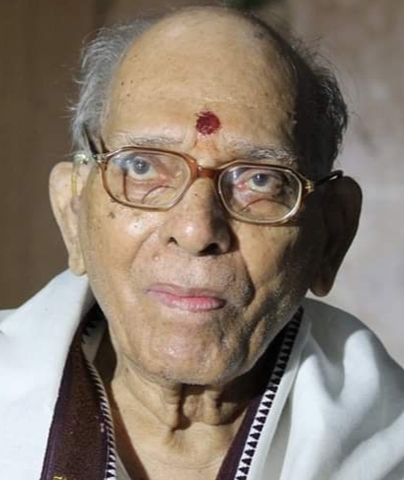
- Linguist, Author
- Born: Korada Mahadeva Sastri; 29 December 1921; Machilipatnam, India
- Died: 11 October 2016 (aged 95); Tirupati, India
- Education: M.A. (Economics and Indian History), M.A. (Comparative Philology), M.A.(Telugu), D.Litt.
- Alma mater: Presidency College, Madras, Madras University, Calcutta University
- Occupations: Professor of Telugu & Linguistics: Annamalai University, S.V. University, S.K. University, and Cologne University
- Spouse: Saraswati
- Relatives: Korada Ramachandra Sastri, Korada Ramakrishnaiya, korada Subrahmanyam
- Writing career
- Notable works: Historical Grammar of Telugu, Descriptive Grammar and Handbook of Modern Telugu, Vyakarana Deepika, Telugu Desya Vyutpatti Nighantuvu, Andhra Vangmaya Parichayamu, Thus Spake Gandhi
- Website: thekorada.com/MahadevaSastri

Korada Mahadeva Sastri (29 December 1921- 11 October 2016) was an Indian linguist. His classic work Historical Grammar of Telugu was the first systematic study on the development of Telugu Language. It provides a survey of the historical development of the Telugu Language from the earliest times. This work helped decipher some Indus Valley seals. He was a founder member of the Dravidian Linguistics Association of India. He was awarded the 2011 C.P.Brown award and Sri Kalapurna award for his lifetime achievements.

Mahadeva Sastri hails from a family of renowned scholars: he was the son of Korada Ramakrishnaiya, the first Telugu scholar to work systematically on Comparative Dravidian Linguistics, the great-grandson of Korada Ramachandra Sastri, author of the first original Telugu play 'Manjari Madhukariyamu'. His academic lineage is equally impressive: he was a student of world renowned linguists Suniti Kumar Chatterji, Sukumar Sen, Kshitish Chandra Chatterji at Calcutta University, and famous historian K.A. Nilakanta Sastri at Madras University.

Mahadeva Sastri was highly influenced by the erudition of his father and his teachers, the speeches of Sarvepalli Radhakrishnan, and the personality of Mohandas Karamchand Gandhi with whom he worked closely as a volunteer (1946-1948) at the Charka (spinning wheel) Center in Karolbagh, Delhi. He participated in Gandhiji's evening prayers at Birla House on Albuquerque road, later renamed Tees January Marg.

== Education ==
Dr. Sastri secured triple postgraduate degrees: M.A. Economics and Indian History from Presidency College, Madras (1942), M.A. Comparative Philology gold medal from Calcutta University (1951), and M.A. Telugu from Madras University (1957). He obtained D.Litt. (1961) for his thesis “Historical Grammar of Telugu” under the guidance of Dr. Suniti Kumar Chatterji from Calcutta University.

== Research ==
Dr. Sastri was a research scholar with famous historian K. A. Nilakanta Sastri in the Department of Indian History, Madras University (1942-1944). He was a research assistant in the Labour Investigation Committee of the Department of Labour, Govt. of India in Simla (1944–46). In 1946 he joined the Federation of Indian Chambers of Commerce and Industry, New Delhi as a Research Officer and worked there till 1948 and published a research report Industrial Profits in India 1940-1945 along with Dr. K M Munshi. After obtaining his M.A. degree from Calcutta University, he joined as Research Trainee of Primitive Linguistics in the Department of Anthropology, Indian Museum, Calcutta (1951-1953)

== Positions held ==
- Lecturer, Department of Linguistics, Annamalai University (1958-1960)
- Reader, Department of Telugu, Sri Venkateswara University, Tirupati (1960-1968)
- Professor and Head, Department of Telugu S.V.University Post-Graduate Center/Sri Krishna Devaraya University (1968-1981)
- Special officer, Principal, Sri Krishnadevaraya University College (1972-1976)
- Visiting Professor, Institute of Indology, Cologne University, Germany (1976-1978)
- Honorary Director, International School of Dravidian Linguistics, Trivandrum (1985-1987)

== Published books ==
GRAMMAR

- Historical Grammar of Telugu (1969). Sri Venkateswara University Post-Graduate Centre, Anantapur (Andhra Pradesh):
  The literary history of the Telugu Language begins in the eleventh century A.D. with the work of Nannaya. Written Telugu had been used for some four centuries before Nannaya for engraving inscriptions and during the course of the present century, an increasing number of these have come to be known, as a result of which a new chapter in the history of Telugu language has come to be written. This forms the main theme of Dr. Mahadeva Sastri's work. Inscriptions are valuable as they give a better picture of linguistic development than literary texts which follow a strict norm. About one hundred inscriptions, from as early as the 6th century A.D. are presented in this work. All this material is evaluated and well-documented by the author, and he has shown how an essentially modern form of Telugu had evolved as the spoken language by the beginning of the 7th century, even though it had to wait till modern times before being gradually adopted for literary purposes.
  Reviews:
  1. "The present monograph unquestionably forms an important contribution to our serious study of Telugu linguistics in particular and of Dravidian in general... Prof. Mahadeva Sastri has given us a comprehensive study of all Old Telugu and middle Telugu inscriptions... I am sure specialists in Telugu and in Dravidian also will find Prof. Mahadeva Sastri's work exceedingly helpful" Suniti Kumar Chatterji (Emeritus Professor of Comparative Philology, Calcutta University, Calcutta, India.)
  2. "Students of Comparative Dravidian as well as students of Telugu will be indebted to him" T. Burrow (Boden Professor of Sanskrit, University of Oxford, Oxford, England.)
  3. "Dr. K. Mahadeva Sastri's 'Historical Grammar of Old Telugu' is one of the most significant of Linguistics works published in recent times in India... The work bears the stamp of mature scholarship." Sukumar Sen (Retired Khaira Professor of Comparative Philology, Calcutta University, Calcutta, India.)
- Descriptive Grammar and Handbook of Modern Telugu (1985). Ed. Klaus Ludwig Janert, Franz Steiner Verlag Wiesbaden GMBH, Stuttgart
  "Within the South Indian family of Dravidian languages, Telugu ranks very high because of its sweet sound and at the same time its sophisticated language, its old culture and wonderful literature... I invited Dr. K. Mahadeva Sastri to my Institute at Cologne, West Germany as a Visiting Professor... to prepare a scholarly and at the same time really practical grammar for Telugu... so that even the non-Dravidian students would be in a position to approach Telugu." Klaus Ludwig Janert (Director of the Institute of Indology, University of Cologne, Cologne, West Germany)
- Vyakarana Deepika (1987). Gangadhara Publications, Vijayawada
  This work is a commentary on the famous and popular Telugu Grammatical treatises 'Bala Vyakaranamu' and 'Prauda Vyakaranamu'. These books describe the literary language. 'Vyakarana Deepika' is an analytical study with a philological background.

ETYMOLOGICAL DICTIONARY

- Telugu Desya Vyutpatti Nighantuvu (2003). Dravidian University, Kuppam
  Etymology, dealing with the way words are formed from basic stems and suffixes, forms an important aspect of language study. The present work, inspired by the ‘Dravidian Etymological Dictionary of Burrow and Emeneau, discusses the words that are formed from a single verbal root, as one unit. It provides cognate forms from other Dravidian languages and gives the reconstructed forms of these words where possible. The specialty of this work lies in giving many other words connected with the root with usages in classical as well as modern works, an aspect not covered in other etymological dictionaries of Telugu.

CRITICAL EDITION

- Kumarasambhavamu (by Nannechoda Kaviraju) (ed) (1987). Telugu University, Hyderabad
  A critical edition of Nannechodadeva's Kumarasambhavamu with introduction, interpretation and notes.

FESTSCHRIFT

- Sri Korada Ramakrishnaiya Centenary Festschrift (1992). SITA Trust, Visakhapatnam
  This is a book edited by Dr. Mahadeva Sastri in tribute to his father on the later's birth centenary year. Along with unpublished works of Ramakrishnaiya, it contains more than a hundred essays on the life and works of Korada Ramakrishnaiya, on language, literature, and culture.

LITERATURE

- Andhra Vangmaya Parichayamu (1985). Saraswati Prachuranamu, Madras
  Andhra Vangmaya Parichayamu provides an introduction to Telugu literature, aimed at beginners, students, and others interested to acquaint themselves with the vast Telugu literature. The book provides a bird’s eye view of the entire literature, starting with Nannaya (11th century A.D.), up to the period of Sri Sri in the 20th century. The work is divided into three parts: The first, ‘Yuga Lakshanamulu’ deals with the different phases of the development of Telugu literature. The second, ‘Prasiddha Padyalu’ is a collection of some of the famous Telugu verses collected from various Telugu kavyas and other texts. The third, ‘Charitraka Samanvayamu’ deals with the ruling dynasties and their patronage to literature. In all, the book provides in a simple language an introduction to Telugu literary field.
- Thus Spake Gandhi(compilation of select quotes of Gandhi with Telugu translation)(1992). SITA Trust, Visakhapatnam
  Selected quotes of M.K. Gandhi are given with their translation in Telugu. These quotations are based on Dr. Sastri's dairy and other sources.
- Bhasha-Samskruti (2014). ISBN 978-93-5156-804-9. Saraswati Prachuranalu, Anantapur
  A series of essays on Telugu language and culture. The influence of Sanskrit and Prakrit on Telugu, the development of Telugu language from the time of Nannaya, Desi chandas that is different from kavyas, the glory of the language in the time of Sri Krishnadeva Raya's Vijayanagara Empire... are described in a short essay form.

== Published articles ==
- "Mana Bhasha-Samskruti", Second World Telugu Conference, Kuala Lumpur, Malaysia, April 1981
- "Sound Symbolism in Telugu", Conference proceedings, Linguistics Society of India, Calcutta, 1980
- "Kavya Bhasha Parinamam 1100 - 1599 AD, Telugu Bhasha Charitra, Andhra Pradesh Sahitya Akademi, Hyderabad, 1974
- "Spontaneous Aspirations in Telugu", Sri Venkateswara University Oriental Research Institute Journal, Tirupati, 1966
- "A Philological Study of Prakrit Inscriptions in Andhra", International Conference of Orientalists, New Delhi, 1965
- "The numeral noun 'one' in Telugu", Guru Poojanjali, Prof. Sukumar Sen Festschrift Volume, Indian Linguistics Journal, Calcutta University, 1965
- "Development of Verbal Forms in Modern Telugu", Suniti Kumar Chatterjee Festschrift Volume, Deccan College, Poona, 1964
- "Dialectical Variation in Eleventh Century Telugu", Tamil Culture, Vol. VI, No. 4, October 1957
- "Language of the Telugu Inscriptions of the 12th and 13th Centuries A.D.", Indian Linguistics Journal, Calcutta University, 1957
- "A Folk Tale in the Dialect of Western Bhojpuri", Linguistic Society of India, Vol XV, 1955
- "Intensive and Inclusive Compounds in Telugu", Indian Linguistics Journal, Calcutta University, 1954.

== Professional associations ==
- Founder secretary of the Dravidian Linguistics Association of India, 1971
- Visiting professor, Institute of Indology, University of Koln, West Germany, 1976-1978
- Visiting Scholar, Faculty of Oriental Studies, Oxford University, 1978
- President of the Dravidian Culture section of the All India Oriental Conference, Shantiniketan, 1980
- Honorary Director, International School of Dravidian Linguistics, Trivandrum, 1985–87

== Awards and honors ==
- 2005 Gangadevi Eminent Citizen Award
- 2008 Mandali Venkata Krishna Rao Award
- 2011 Sreenatha Peetham Life Time Achievement Award
- 2011 Sousheelya Life Time Achievement Award
- 2011 C.P. Brown Award
- 2013 Sri Kala Purna title by SAPNA
- 2014 Vennela Sahitya Vedika Lifetime Achievement Award
