= Korada Ramachandra Sastri =

Indian playwright

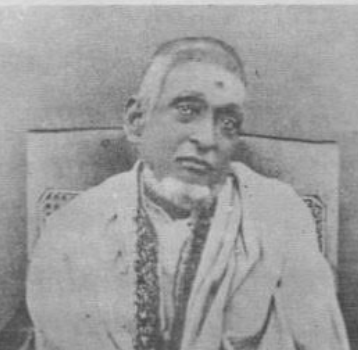
- Poet and Playwright in Sanskrit and Telugu
- Born: Korada Ramachandra Sastri; 12 October 1815; Kesanakurru, A. P., India
- Died: 11 August 1900 (aged 84); Machilipatnam, India
- Occupations: Telugu Pandit at Nobel College, Machilipatnam
- Spouse: Seetamma
- Relatives: Korada Ramakrishnaiya, Korada Mahadeva Sastri, Korada Subrahmanyam
- Writing career
- Notable works: Manjari Madhukariamu, Nayapradipamu (Vigrahamu); Ghanavrttam , Upamavali, Kumarodayaha
- Website: thekorada.com/RamachandraSastri

Korada Ramachandra Sastri (12 October 1815 – 11 August 1900) was an Indian poet and playwright in Sanskrit and Telugu. He was the first known original Telugu playwright. His Manjarimadhukariam is the first Telugu drama with an original concept. His Sanskrit lyric poem Ghanavrttam is a sequel to Kalidasa's Meghaduta. Ramachandra Sastri authored more than thirty works in Sanskrit and Telugu but only a few books are extant. His books give us an appreciation of the advanced poetic and linguistic aspects of his literary works.

== Sanskrit books ==
- Ghanavrttam is a sequel to Kalidasa's Meghaduta. Meghaduta stops with Yaksha’s message to the cloud. Ghanavrttam completes the story – the cloud messenger goes to Alakapuri where he delivers the message and returns to Yaksha with the beloved's message. The story ends with the reunion of the couple. This lyric poem consists of 175 verses in two chapters.
- Upamavali is a kavya on alankara-sastra, the science of aesthetics, embellishments, and beauty. It has 358 slokas in two chapters.
- Kumarodayah Champu is a maha kavya, resembling Kalidasa's Kumarasambhavam but in Champu style. The work is divided into 27 chapters with terse verse interspersed among prose sections.

== Telugu books ==
- Manjarimadhukariamu (pronounced 'Manjaree Madhukareeyamu' in Telugu) is the first original Telugu drama. It tells the story of King Madhukara's marriage to princess Manjari. Madhukara encounters the princess in a dream and resolves to find and marry her. He becomes forlorn and despondent after a futile search, and his queen does not know why. Manjari suffers Chandayogini's witchcraft and lands in the queen's palace. The queen hides away the beautiful princess Manjari from the king. She soon realizes the reason for the king’s despondency and learns that Manjari is her own cousin. The queen arranges for the marriage uniting Manjari and Madhukara. As noted by Amaresh Datta, chief editor, Encyclopedia of Indian Literature, "though none of the early plays of dramatists were put on board, they paved the way for modern Telugu Drama."
- Parsurama Vijayamu is an original prose work of the author describing the victory of Parasurama.

== Sanskrit to Telugu translations ==
- Nayapradipamu is a Telugu translation to Vishnu Sharma's Panchatantra (Vigrahamu) in Sanskrit.
- Rathangadutamu is a Sanskrit to Telugu translation of the sandesa kavya of the same name.
- Unmattaraghavamu is Ramachandra Sastri's Telugu translation of Bhaskara Kavi's Sanskrit original.
- Satika Andhra Samasa Nalacharitramu is a Telugu translation of the Sanskrit work Nalacharitram with word to word meaning and translation.
