= Korada Ramakrishnayya =

Dravidian philologist (1891-1962)

- కోరాడ రామకృష్ణయ్య
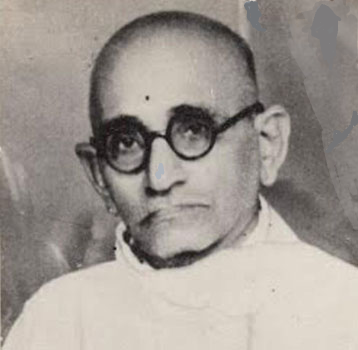
- Born: Korada Ramakrishnayya; 2 October 1891; Amalapuram, India
- Died: 28 March 1962 (aged 70); Tirupati, India
- Education: M.A.
- Alma mater: Nobel College, Machilipatnam, Madras University
- Occupations: Telugu faculty at Noble College, Machilipatnam, Maharaja College, Vizayanagarm, Madras University, and Oriental Research Institute, Tirupati
- Spouse: Annapurna (Khandavilli)
- Relatives: Korada Ramachandra Sastri, Korada Mahadeva Sastri
- Writing career
- Notable works: Sandhi, Desi, Dravidian Cognates, Andhra Bharata Kavita Vimarshanamu
- Website: thekorada.com/Ramakrishnaiya

Korada Ramakrishnayya (2 October 1891 – 28 March 1962) was a Dravidian philologist and litterateur. He was the first Telugu scholar to publish research works on comparative Dravidian linguistics. He published the first literary criticism based on modern methods 'Andhra Bharata Kavita Vimarshanamu'.

Ramakrishnayya authored works of fundamental importance and extended the borders of research in Telugu literary criticism, history of the Telugu language, philological interpretation of Telugu grammar, cognate Dravidian vocabulary, comparative Dravidian grammar, and comparative Dravidian prosody.

== Early life ==
Korada Ramakrishnayya was born on 2 October 1891 in Amalapuram, East Godavari district, at his grandmother's house. His parents were Sitamma and Lakshmi Manoharam.

He completed his early education and graduated with a Bachelor of Arts (B.A.) degree from Noble College, Machilipatnam in 1915. After his graduation, he worked as a lecturer at the same college. Later, he pursued his Master of Arts (M.A.) at Presidency College, Madras, and completed his degree in 1921.

== Career ==
After completing his B.A., Ramakrishnayya worked as a lecturer at Noble College, Machilipatnam. He then taught Telugu and Sanskrit at Maharajah's College in Vizianagaram. After earning his M.A., he served for 12 years (1915–1927) at Maharajah's College. In 1927, he joined Madras University as the Head of the Department of Telugu. He retired in 1950. Following his retirement, he worked for six years at the Tirupati TTD in the Department of Oriental Research.

== Publications ==
Korada Ramakrishnayya was among the first to show that Southern Indian languages share a common metrical tradition in poetry. He established high standards in linguistic research and was recognized for his scientific approach to language studies. He was also a pioneer in applying historical knowledge of words to illuminate social history, and he contributed significantly to the promotion of democracy and public discourse through his works.

Telugu literary criticism

- Andhra Bharata Kavita Vimarsanamu (1929): Ramakrishnaiya established a new line of literary criticism based on modern methods in his monumental work Andhra Bharata Kavita Vimarsanamu. Herein he compared the Telugu text with that of the Sanskrit original. He confined himself to Virata Parva - "as no authorized version for other parvas is available so far".This work published in 1929 received the highest appreciation in literary circles: Reviews:
  1. The Journal of the Andhra Historical Research Society, October 1931, said "... we think that literary criticism should flow hereafter on the lines suggested by him...". 2. Tekumalla Achyuta Rao commented "Excellent exposition of the subject which is new in the field of Telugu literary criticism." 3. Hindu dated 18 June 1930 said "... The work is scholarly without being pedantic, and interesting without being too popular. The Pre-Nannaya period in Telugu is traced with great skill... The author has chosen the right passages and his method of treatment is exceedingly interesting... the enumeration of artistic qualities of Tikkana's verse shows rare insight and critical acumen in the author..."
- Kalidasuni Kalapratibhalu (1930):
- Nannicoḍadeva Kumarasambhava Vimarsamu (1937):
- Telugu literature outside the Telugu country (1941):
- Saraswata Vyasalu (1944):
- Dakshina Desa Bhasha Sahityamulu - Desi (1954)

History of Telugu language

- Bhasotpattikramamu-Bhasacaritamu (1948) Ramakrishnaiya was the first to write a Historical Grammar for the language of the pre-Nannaya inscriptions of the first millennium A.D. and for the subsequent ages, for Nannaya, Tikkana, Errana, and Nannichoda. His son Korada Mahadeva Sastri continued the work and published the magnum opus 'Historical Grammar of Telugu - With Special Reference to Old Telugu C. 200 B.C. - 1000 A.D."
- Bhasa Caritraka Vyasamulu (1954)
- Presidential address (1940): At the 10th All India Oriental Conference held in Tirupati in March 1940, Telugu won recognition as an independent unit and as a result got separate recognition at the All-India Oriental Conference. In his presidential address to the first Telugu section at an Oriental Conference, Ramakrishnaiya traced the beginnings and the progress of literary and linguistic studies in Telugu.

Philological interpretation of Telugu grammar

- Sandhi (1935): is the first attempt in Telugu to introduce the Historical method into the field of Telugu grammatical studies. He detailed how when considered from a historical point of view the sandhi changes explain themselves in a more consistent and rationalistic manner. For example puvu + remma becomes pu-remma. Why? Because pu was the earlier form of puvu, and it survives in compound construction.

Cognate Dravidian vocabulary

- Dravidian Cognates (1944): Ramakrishnaiya studied and collected vocabulary common to the major Dravidian languages in 'Dravidian Cognates' and paved the way for the comprehensive work 'The Dravidian Etymological Dictionary' of Burrow and Emeneau.

Comparative Dravidian grammar

- Studies in Dravidian Philology (1935): Ramakrishnaiya continued the work of Robert Caldwell in a systematic manner on the comparative grammar of the Dravidian Languages and contributed to the advancement of the subject, forming a milestone, as it were, in the development of comparative Dravidian studies.

Comparative Dravidian prosody

- Dakshina Desa Bhasha Sahityamulu - Desi (1954): For the first time, Ramakrishnaiya pointed out, that there is a common literary and prosodial tradition for all the South Indian languages. The ner-nirai system of Tamil prosody is comparable to matra ganas in Telugu and Kannada. Desi chandassu (indigenous metres) in Tamil, Telugu, and Kannada are generally two or three-line formations and set to music. He published numerous papers bearing on comparative Dravidian literature.

Critical editions and translations

- Ghanavritham (1917)
- Bhimeswara Puranam (1919)
- Syamantakopakhyanamu (1920)
- Vishnupuranamu(1930)
- Vishnumayanatakamu (1934)
- Navanathacharitamu (1937)
- Andhra Bharata Paathanirnaya Padhati (1937)
- Vallabhabhyudayamu (1940)
- Paratatvarasayanamu (1941)
- Sri Venkateswara Stuti Ratnamala (1952)
- Korada Vamsa Prashasti (1952)
- Srinivasa Vilasamu (1954)
- Matasarasangrahamu (1955)

== Personal life ==
Korada Ramakrishnayya was the eldest of two brothers, his brother being Korada Seshavadhani. Ramakrishnayya was married to Annapurnamma from the Khandavilli family of Munganda Agraharam. They had 3 sons and 2 daughters. The elder son was Korada Ramachandra Sastry while second son being noted linguist Korada Mahadeva Sastri and the third son was Korada Nageswara Rao. His elder daughter was Susarla Sita Devi married to Susarla Gopala Sastry of Vizag and the younger daughter is Bhamidi Kamala Devi married to Bhamidi Viswanadha Sarma of Palangi near Tanuku. Korada Ramakrishnayya comes from a rich line of Telugu scholars, litterateurs, and writers, with his grandfather Korada Ramachandra Sastri being the first known original Telugu playwright.

== See also ==
- Dravidian studies
- Dravidian University
- Elamo-Dravidian
- Proto-Dravidian
